= Rowing at the 1968 Summer Olympics =

Rowing at the Games of the XIX Olympiad
- Venue: Virgilio Uribe Rowing and Canoeing Course
- Date: 13–19 October 1968
- Competitors: 353 from 29 nations

Rowing at the 1968 Summer Olympics featured seven events, for men only. The events took place at Lake Xochimilco.

== Medal summary ==
=== Men's events ===
Games	Gold	Silver	Bronze
Single sculls	Jan Wienese; Netherlands	Jochen Meißner; West Germany	Alberto Demiddi; Argentina
Double sculls	Aleksandr Timoshinin and Anatoliy Sass; Soviet Union	Harry Droog and Leendert van Dis; Netherlands	John Nunn and Bill Maher; United States
Coxless pair	Jörg Lucke and Heinz-Jürgen Bothe; East Germany	Larry Hough and Philip Johnson; United States	Peter Christiansen and Ib Larsen; Denmark
Coxed pair	Italy; Primo Baran; Renzo Sambo; Bruno Cipolla	Netherlands; Herman Suselbeek; Hadriaan van Nes; Roderick Rijnders	Denmark; Jørn Krab; Harry Jørgensen; Preben Krab
Coxless four	East Germany; Frank Forberger; Frank Rühle; Dieter Grahn; Dieter Schubert	Hungary; Zoltán Melis; József Csermely; György Sarlós; Antal Melis	Italy; Renato Bosatta; Pier Conti-Manzini; Tullio Baraglia; Abramo Albini
Coxed four	New Zealand; Dick Joyce; Ross Collinge; Dudley Storey; Warren Cole; Simon Dickie	East Germany; Peter Kremtz; Manfred Gelpke; Roland Göhler; Klaus Jacob; Dieter Semetzky	Switzerland; Denis Oswald; Peter Bolliger; Hugo Waser; Jakob Grob; Gottlieb Fröhlich
Eight	West Germany; Horst Meyer; Wolfgang Hottenrott; Dirk Schreyer; Egbert Hirschfelder; Rüdiger Henning; Jörg Siebert; Lutz Ulbricht; Niko Ott; Gunther Tiersch (cox); Roland Böse (heat 1)	Australia; Bob Shirlaw; Gary Pearce; John Ranch; David Douglas; Peter Dickson; Joe Fazio; Michael Morgan; Alf Duval; Alan Grover	Soviet Union; Zigmas Jukna; Aleksandr Martyshkin; Antanas Bagdonavičius; Vytautas Briedis; Volodymyr Sterlik; Valentyn Kravchuk; Juozas Jagelavičius; Viktor Suslin; Yuriy Lorentsson

== Participating nations ==
A total of 353 rowers from 29 nations competed at the Mexico Games:

- Argentina (9)
- Australia (11)
- Austria (3)
- Belgium (1)
- Bulgaria (5)
- Brazil (2)
- Canada (14)
- Cuba (11)
- Czechoslovakia (15)
- Denmark (10)
- Egypt
- Spain (3)
- Finland (2)
- France (17)
- Great Britain (11)
- East Germany (26)
- West Germany (26)
- Italy (14)
- Hungary (6)
- Japan (10)
- Mexico (25)
- Netherlands (22)
- New Zealand (14)
- Peru (3)
- Poland (3)
- Romania (14)
- Switzerland (17)
- Soviet Union (27)
- United States (27)
- Uruguay (5)

== Medal table ==
Rank	Nation	Gold	Silver	Bronze	Total
1	East Germany	2	1	0	3
2	Netherlands	1	2	0	3
3	West Germany	1	1	0	2
4	Italy	1	0	1	2
4	Soviet Union	1	0	1	2
6	New Zealand	1	0	0	1
7	United States	0	1	1	2
8	Australia	0	1	0	1
8	Hungary	0	1	0	1
10	Denmark	0	0	2	2
11	Argentina	0	0	1	1
11	Switzerland	0	0	1	1
Totals (12 entries)		7	7	7	21
