= Rowing at the 1968 Summer Olympics – Men's eight =

Men's eight at the Games of the XIX Olympiad
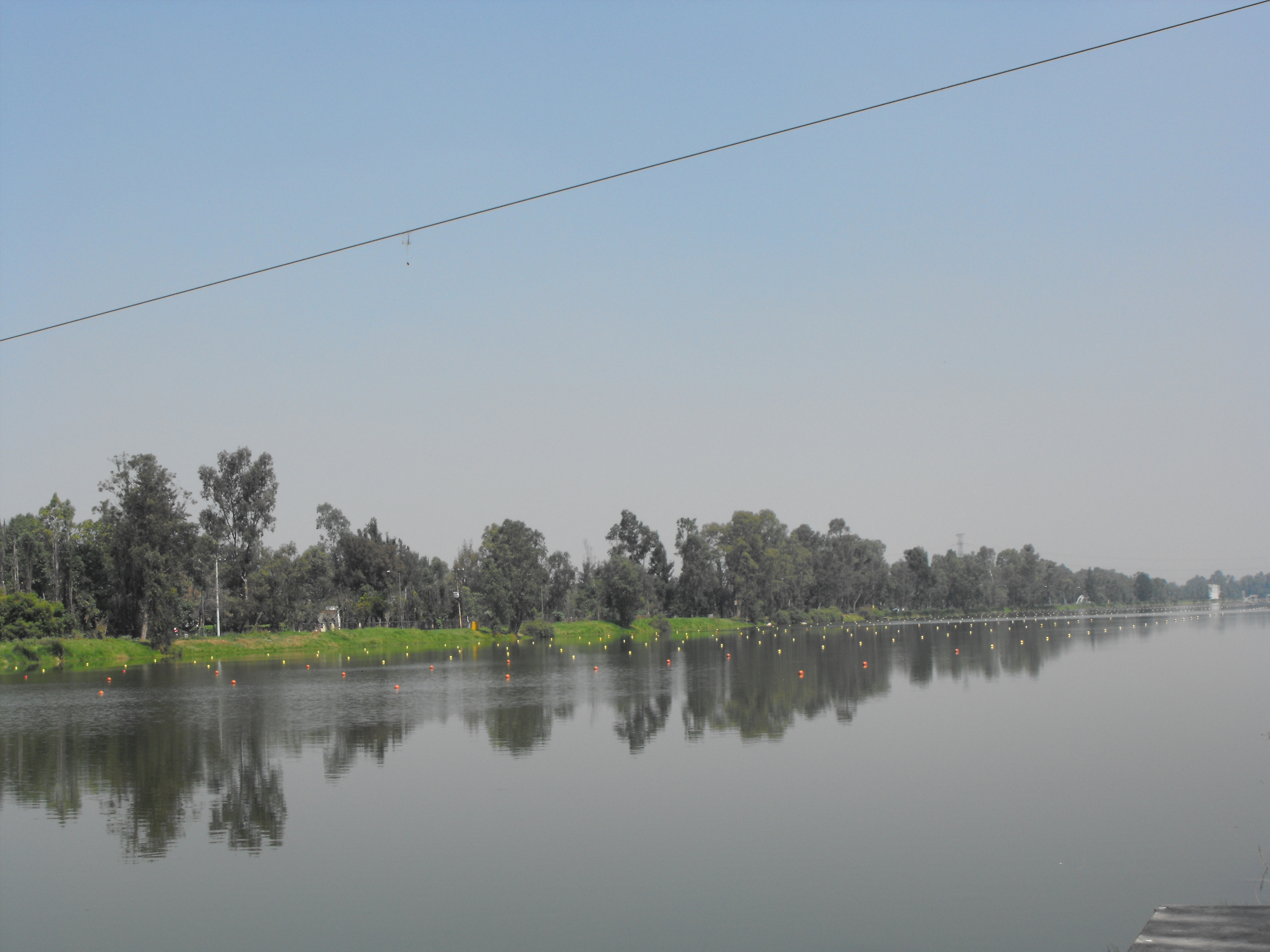
- The venue in 2015
- Venue: Virgilio Uribe Rowing and Canoeing Course
- Dates: 13–19 October 1968
- Competitors: 113 from 12 nations
- Winning time: 6:07.00

Medalists
1st place, gold medalist(s)		West Germany: Horst Meyer; Dirk Schreyer; Rüdiger Henning; Lutz Ulbricht; Wolfgang Hottenrott; Egbert Hirschfelder; Jörg Siebert; Niko Ott; Gunther Tiersch (cox); Roland Böse (heat 1)
2nd place, silver medalist(s)		Australia: Alf Duval; Michael Morgan; Joe Fazio; Peter Dickson; David Douglas; John Ranch; Gary Pearce; Bob Shirlaw; Alan Grover (cox)
3rd place, bronze medalist(s)		Soviet Union: Zigmas Jukna; Aleksandr Martyshkin; Antanas Bagdonavičius; Vytautas Briedis; Volodymyr Sterlik; Valentyn Kravchuk; Juozas Jagelavičius; Viktor Suslin; Yuriy Lorentsson

The men's eight competition at the 1968 Summer Olympics took place at Virgilio Uribe Rowing and Canoeing Course, Mexico City, Mexico. It was held from 13 to 19 October and was won by the team from West Germany, with the teams from Australia and the Soviet Union claiming silver and bronze respectively. It was West Germany's first appearance as a separate nation, though the United Team of Germany had won gold in 1960 and silver in 1964, with West Germans making up those teams. The silver medal was Australia's best result yet in the event; the nation had previously taken bronze in 1952 and 1956. The Soviet Union reached the podium in the men's eight for the first time since earning silver in 1952. Twelve teams from 12 nations attended the competition. Five of the teams replaced a total of five rowers during the competition, making for a total of 113 rowers who participated in the races.

== Background ==
This was the 15th appearance of the event. Rowing had been on the programme in 1896 but was cancelled due to bad weather. The men's eight has been held every time that rowing has been contested, beginning in 1900.

The United States had won this event at eight of the last nine Olympics, only missing out in 1960. West Germany was one of the favourites, as they had won the last four European Championships and the last two World Championships (in 1962 and 1966). The Soviet Union had a number of silver medal placings at recent events and were also among the favourites.

Mexico made its debut in the event; East and West Germany competed separately for the first time. Canada and the United States each made their 13th appearance, tied for most among nations to that point.

== Competition format ==
The "eight" event featured nine-person boats, with eight rowers and a coxswain. It was a sweep rowing event, with the rowers each having one oar (and thus each rowing on one side). This rowing competition consisted of two main rounds (semifinals and finals), as well as a repechage round that allowed teams that did not win their heats to advance to the final. The course used the 2000 metres distance that became the Olympic standard in 1912 (with the exception of 1948). Races were held in up to six lanes.

- Semifinals: Two heats. With 12 boats entered, there were six boats per heat. The winner of each heat (2 boats) advanced directly to the "A" final; all other boats (10 total) went to the repechage.
- Repechage: Two heats. With 10 boats racing in but not winning their initial heats, there were five boats per repechage heat. The top two boats in each repechage heat (4 boats total) advanced to the "A" final, while all remaining boats (3rd, 4th, and 5th place in each heat, for a total of 6 boats) went to the "B" final (out of medal contention).
- Finals: The "A" final consisted of the six boats that had won either the semifinal heats or the repechage heats, competing for the medals and 4th through 6th place. The "B" final had the 2nd and 3rd-place finishers from the repechage heats; they competed for 7th through 12th place.

== Schedule ==
All times are Central Standard Time (UTC-6)

Date	Time	Round
Sunday, 13 October 1968	13:15	Semifinals
Tuesday, 15 October 1968	11:30	Repechage
Friday, 18 October 1968	13:00	Final B
Saturday, 19 October 1968	14:00	Final A

== Results ==
Rowers are shown as per the seats occupied in the official results book published by the Organizing Committee of the Games of the XIX Olympiad.

=== Semifinals ===
Two heats were rowed on 13 October. The winning teams qualified for the final, and the remaining teams progressed to the repechage.

==== Semifinal 1 ====
Rank	Rowers	Coxswain	Nation	Time	Notes
1	Horst Meyer; Dirk Schreyer; Rüdiger Henning; Lutz Ulbricht; Wolfgang Hottenrott; Egbert Hirschfelder; Jörg Siebert; Roland Böse	Gunther Tiersch	West Germany	6:04.22	QA
2	Alf Duval; Michael Morgan; Joe Fazio; Peter Dickson; David Douglas; John Ranch; Gary Pearce; Bob Shirlaw	Alan Grover	Australia	6:06.87	R
3	Petr Čermák; Milan Hurtala; Vladimír Jánoš; Zdeněk Kuba; Otakar Mareček; Oldřich Svojanovský; Pavel Svojanovský; Jan Wallisch	Jiří Pták	Czechoslovakia	6:13.30	R
4	Neil Campbell; John Ross; Clayton Brown; Richard Crooker; John Richardson; Richard Symsyk; John McIntyre; Daryl MacDonald	Joel Finley	Canada	6:21.22	R
5	Miguel Fuentes; Amado Mediña; Federico Arce; Edgar Morales; Antonio Páramo; Víctor Cervantes; Sergio Vásquez; Emilio Leal	Rodolfo Santillán	Mexico	6:32.66	R
6	Masatoshi Shimizu; Tomio Murai; Tadamasa Kato; Shigeru Miyagawa; Fumio Nakata; Jujiro Tanaka; Toshi Fukumasu; Yoshinori Arai	Katsumi Yamamoto	Japan	6:34.79	R

==== Semifinal 2 ====
The Official Report of the Organising Committee lists Michael Livingston in seat 7 of the United States boat, but this is incorrect, as he travelled to the 1968 Games as a reserve only. It was his elder brother, Cleve Livingston, who sat in seat 7 for the heat and final.

Rank	Rowers	Coxswain	Nation	Time	Notes
1	Alan Webster; Wybo Veldman; Alistair Dryden; John Hunter; Mark Brownlee; John Gibbons; Tom Just; Gil Cawood	Robert Page	New Zealand	6:05.62	QA
2	Peter Hein; Klaus-Dieter Bähr; Claus Wilke; Günter Bergau; Peter Gorny; Reinhard Zerfowski; Manfred Schneider; Peter Prompe	Karl-Heinz Danielowski	East Germany	6:09.48	R
3	Zigmas Jukna; Antanas Bagdonavičius; Volodymyr Sterlik; Juozas Jagelavičius; Aleksandr Martyshkin; Vytautas Briedis; Valentyn Kravchuk; Viktor Suslin	Yuriy Lorentsson	Soviet Union	6:09.65	R
4	Maarten Kloosterman; Erik Wesdorp; Jan van Laarhoven; Jan Steinhauser; Eric Niehe; Gee van Enst; Jaap Reesink; Piet Bon	Arthur Koning	Netherlands	6:12.23	R
5	Arthur Evans; Curtis Canning; Andy Larkin; Scott Steketee; Franklin Hobbs; Steve Brooks; Cleve Livingston; David Higgins	Paul Hoffman	United States	6:15.42	R
6	Peter Thomas; Andrew Bayles; Patrick Wright; Peter Knapp; Malcolm Malpass; Robin Yarrow; Bruce Carter; Matthew Cooper	Timothy Kirk	Great Britain	6:22.20	R

=== Repechage ===
Two heats were rowed in the semi-finals on 15 October. Of the five teams competing per heat, the first two would qualify for the final, while the others would progress to the small final.

==== Repechage heat 1 ====
In the boat of the United States, Jake Fiechter in seat 6 replaced Cleve Livingston, who had taken seat 7 in the first round. Steve Brooks displaced Arthur Evans as stroke, with the latter moving to seat 7.

Rank	Rowers	Coxswain	Nation	Time	Notes
1	Petr Čermák; Milan Hurtala; Vladimír Jánoš; Zdeněk Kuba; Otakar Mareček; Oldřich Svojanovský; Pavel Svojanovský; Jan Wallisch	Jiří Pták	Czechoslovakia	6:19.34	QA
2	Steve Brooks; Curtis Canning; Andy Larkin; Scott Steketee; Franklin Hobbs; Jake Fiechter; Arthur Evans; David Higgins	Paul Hoffman	United States	6:19.81	QA
3	Peter Hein; Klaus-Dieter Bähr; Claus Wilke; Günter Bergau; Peter Gorny; Reinhard Zerfowski; Manfred Schneider; Peter Prompe	Karl-Heinz Danielowski	East Germany	6:21.71	QB
4	Neil Campbell; John Ross; Clayton Brown; Richard Crooker; John Richardson; Richard Symsyk; John McIntyre; Daryl MacDonald	Joel Finley	Canada	6:31.14	QB
5	Peter Thomas; Andrew Bayles; Patrick Wright; Peter Knapp; Malcolm Malpass; Robin Yarrow; Bruce Carter; Matthew Cooper	Timothy Kirk	Great Britain	6:43.55	QB

==== Repechage heat 2 ====
Rank	Rowers	Coxswain	Nation	Time	Notes
1	Alf Duval; Michael Morgan; Joe Fazio; Peter Dickson; David Douglas; John Ranch; Gary Pearce; Bob Shirlaw	Alan Grover	Australia	6:10.80	QA
2	Zigmas Jukna; Antanas Bagdonavičius; Volodymyr Sterlik; Juozas Jagelavičius; Aleksandr Martyshkin; Vytautas Briedis; Valentyn Kravchuk; Viktor Suslin	Yuriy Lorentsson	Soviet Union	6:12.12	QA
3	Maarten Kloosterman; Erik Wesdorp; Jan van Laarhoven; Jan Steinhauser; Eric Niehe; Gee van Enst; Jaap Reesink; Piet Bon	Arthur Koning	Netherlands	6:12.90	QB
4	Miguel Fuentes; Amado Mediña; Federico Arce; Edgar Morales; Antonio Páramo; Víctor Cervantes; Sergio Vásquez; Emilio Leal	Rodolfo Santillán	Mexico	6:43.13	QB
5	Masatoshi Shimizu; Tomio Murai; Tadamasa Kato; Shigeru Miyagawa; Fumio Nakata; Jujiro Tanaka; Toshi Fukumasu; Yoshinori Arai	Katsumi Yamamoto	Japan	6:44.37	QB

=== Finals ===
==== Final B ====
The small final (now termed B final) was raced on 18 October. Great Britain replaced Malcolm Malpass in seat 5 with John Mullard in this race, and Canada replaced John Richardson in seat 5 with Daryl Sturdy. Mexico changed the seats for all rowers apart from the cox, and East Germany changed four of the seats. The Netherlands changed all seats apart from the stroke and the cox.

Rank	Rowers	Coxswain	Nation	Time
7	Günter Bergau; Klaus-Dieter Bähr; Claus Wilke; Peter Gorny; Reinhard Zerfowski; Peter Hein; Manfred Schneider; Peter Prompe	Karl-Heinz Danielowski	East Germany	6:11.69
8	Maarten Kloosterman; Piet Bon; Eric Niehe; Jaap Reesink; Gee van Enst; Jan Steinhauser; Erik Wesdorp; Jan van Laarhoven	Arthur Koning	Netherlands	6:14.18
9	Neil Campbell; John Ross; Clayton Brown; Richard Crooker; Daryl Sturdy; Richard Symsyk; John McIntyre; Daryl MacDonald	Joel Finley	Canada	6:18.65
10	Peter Thomas; Andrew Bayles; Patrick Wright; Peter Knapp; John Mullard; Robin Yarrow; Bruce Carter; Matthew Cooper	Timothy Kirk	Great Britain	6:29.23
11	Edgar Morales; Víctor Cervantes; Emilio Leal; Sergio Vásquez; Miguel Fuentes; Antonio Páramo; Federico Arce; Amado Mediña	Rodolfo Santillán	Mexico	6:41.62
12	Masatoshi Shimizu; Tomio Murai; Tadamasa Kato; Shigeru Miyagawa; Fumio Nakata; Jujiro Tanaka; Toshi Fukumasu; Yoshinori Arai	Katsumi Yamamoto	Japan	6:52.02

==== Final A ====
The final (now termed A final) was raced on 19 October. On the morning of the race, the West German team replaced Roland Böse—who was suffering from angina pectoris and had developed a fever—with Niko Ott in seat 8. The team from Czechoslovakia replaced Milan Hurtala (seat 2) with Karel Kolesa (seat 4), and all the remaining rowers apart from the cox took different seats in the final compared to the two previous races. The team from the United States replaced Arthur Evans with Cleve Livingston in seat 7.

After the medal ceremony, Ott gave his gold medal to Böse, but another medal was later minted for Ott. As per convention, the Olympic results database lists Böse as a medallist based on the fact that he competed in the qualifying race.

Rank	Rowers	Coxswain	Nation	Time
1st place, gold medalist(s)	Horst Meyer; Dirk Schreyer; Rüdiger Henning; Lutz Ulbricht; Wolfgang Hottenrott; Egbert Hirschfelder; Jörg Siebert; Niko Ott	Gunther Tiersch	West Germany	6:07.00
2nd place, silver medalist(s)	Alf Duval; Michael Morgan; Joe Fazio; Peter Dickson; David Douglas; John Ranch; Gary Pearce; Bob Shirlaw	Alan Grover	Australia	6:07.98
3rd place, bronze medalist(s)	Zigmas Jukna; Antanas Bagdonavičius; Volodymyr Sterlik; Juozas Jagelavičius; Aleksandr Martyshkin; Vytautas Briedis; Valentyn Kravchuk; Viktor Suslin	Yuriy Lorentsson	Soviet Union	6:09.11
4	Alan Webster; Wybo Veldman; Alistair Dryden; John Hunter; Mark Brownlee; John Gibbons; Tom Just; Gil Cawood	Robert Page	New Zealand	6:10.43
5	Vladimír Jánoš; Zdeněk Kuba; Oldřich Svojanovský; Karel Kolesa; Pavel Svojanovský; Jan Wallisch; Otakar Mareček; Petr Čermák	Jiří Pták	Czechoslovakia	6:12.17
6	Steve Brooks; Curtis Canning; Andy Larkin; Scott Steketee; Franklin Hobbs; Jake Fiechter; Cleve Livingston; David Higgins	Paul Hoffman	United States	6:14.34
