= Czechoslovakia at the 1968 Summer Olympics =

- IOC code: TCH (CHE used at these Games)
- NOC: Czechoslovak Olympic Committee

in Mexico City
- Competitors: 121 (94 men, 27 women) in 14 sports
- Flag bearer: Bohumil Golián (volleyball)
- Medals Ranked 7th: Gold 7 Silver 2 Bronze 4 Total 13

Summer Olympics appearances (overview)
- 1920; 1924; 1928; 1932; 1936; 1948; 1952; 1956; 1960; 1964; 1968; 1972; 1976; 1980; 1984; 1988; 1992

Other related appearances
- Bohemia (1900–1912); Czech Republic (1994–pres.); Slovakia (1994–pres.)

Czechoslovakia competed at the 1968 Summer Olympics in Mexico City, Mexico. 121 competitors, 94 men and 27 women, took part in 66 events in 14 sports.

== Medalists ==
Medal	Name	Sport	Event
Gold	Miloslava Rezková	Athletics	Women's high jump
Gold	Milena Duchková	Diving	Women's 10 m platform
Gold	Věra Čáslavská	Gymnastics	Women's individual all-around
Gold	Věra Čáslavská	Gymnastics	Women's floor
Gold	Věra Čáslavská	Gymnastics	Women's vault
Gold	Věra Čáslavská	Gymnastics	Women's uneven bars
Gold	Jan Kůrka	Shooting	Mixed 50 m rifle, prone
Silver	Věra Čáslavská	Gymnastics	Women's balance beam
Silver	Věra Čáslavská; Marianna Krajčírová; Jana Kubičková; Hana Lišková; Bohumila Řimnáčová; Miroslava Skleničková	Gymnastics	Women's team all-around
Bronze	Ludvík Daněk	Athletics	Men's discus throw
Bronze	Czechoslovakia men's national volleyball team: Antonín Procházka; Jiří Svoboda; Luboš Zajíček; Josef Musil; Josef Smolka; Vladimír Petlák; Petr Kop; František Sokol; Bohunil Golián; Zdeněk Groessl; Pavel Schenk; Drahomír Koudelka	Volleyball	Men's tournament
Bronze	Miroslav Zeman	Wrestling	Men's Greco-Roman 52 kg
Bronze	Petr Kment	Wrestling	Men's Greco-Roman +97 kg

== Cycling ==
Eight cyclists represented Czechoslovakia in 1968.

Individual road race

- Jan Smolík
- Petr Hladík

Sprint

- Ivan Kučírek
- Miloš Jelínek

1000m time trial

- Miloš Jelínek

Tandem

- Ivan Kučírek
- Miloš Jelínek

Individual pursuit

- Jiří Daler

Individual pursuit

- Jiří Daler
- Pavel Kondr
- Milan Puzrla
- František Řezáč

== Diving ==
Women

Athlete	Event	Preliminary		Final			
Athlete	Event	Points	Rank	Points	Rank	Total	Rank
Milena Duchková	3 m springboard	91.57	5 Q	36.28	11	127.85	10
Milena Duchková	10 m platform	51.61	3 Q	57.98	1	109.59	1st place, gold medalist(s)

== Modern pentathlon ==
One male pentathlete represented Czechoslovakia in 1968.

Individual

- Pavel Kupka

== Rowing ==
In 1968, Czechoslovakia entered boats in four of the seven events: men's single sculls, men's double sculls, men's coxed pair, men's eight. The competition was for men only; women would first row at the 1976 Summer Olympics.

Athlete	Event	Heats		Repechage		Semi-finals		Final	
Athlete	Event	Time	Rank	Time	Rank	Time	Rank	Time	Rank
Václav Kozák	Single sculls	7:59.93	4 R	7:49.93	3 SF	8:01.81	4 FB	7:45.81	9
Jaroslav Hellebrand; Petr Krátký	Double sculls	7:10.35	2 SF	Bye		DNS			
Karel Kolesa; Ivan Miluška; Karel Kovář (cox)	Coxed pair	9:02.98	4 R	DNS					
Vladimír Jánoš; Zdeněk Kuba; Oldřich Svojanovský; Karel Kolesa; Pavel Svojanovský; Jan Wallisch; Otakar Mareček; Petr Čermák; Jiří Pták (cox); Milan Hurtala (heat 1 and repechage)	Eight	6:13.30	3 R	6:19.34	1 FA	—N/a		6:12.17	5

== Shooting ==
Eight shooters, all men, represented Czechoslovakia in 1968. Jan Kůrka won gold in the 50 m rifle, prone.

25 m pistol

- Lubomír Nácovský
- Ladislav Falta

50 m pistol

- Hynek Hromada
- Jaroslav Veselý

300 m rifle, three positions

- Jan Kůrka
- Ondrej Šima

50 m rifle, three positions

- Jan Kůrka
- Jaroslav Navrátil

50 m rifle, prone

- Jan Kůrka
- Rudolf Pojer

== Volleyball ==
=== Men's team competition ===
- Round robin
  - Defeated East Germany (3-2)
  - Defeated United States (3-1)
  - Defeated Japan (3-2)
  - Defeated Brazil (3-2)
  - Defeated Mexico (3-0)
  - Defeated Bulgaria (3-2)
  - Defeated Belgium (3-0)
  - Lost to Poland (1-3)
  - Lost to Soviet Union (0-3) → Bronze Medal
- Team Roster
  - Antonín Procházka
  - Jiří Svoboda
  - Luboš Zajíček
  - Josef Musil
  - Josef Smolka
  - Vladimír Petlák
  - Petr Kop
  - František Sokol
  - Bohunil Golián
  - Zdeněk Groessl
  - Pavel Schenk
  - Drahomír Koudelka
- Head coach: Václav Matiášek

=== Women's team competition ===
- Round robin
  - Lost to Soviet Union (1-3)
  - Defeated United States (3-1)
  - Defeated Mexico (3-0)
  - Lost to Japan (0-3)
  - Defeated Peru (3-2)
  - Lost to Poland (0-3)
  - Lost to South Korea (1-3) → Sixth place
- Team Roster
