= 1967 European Rowing Championships =

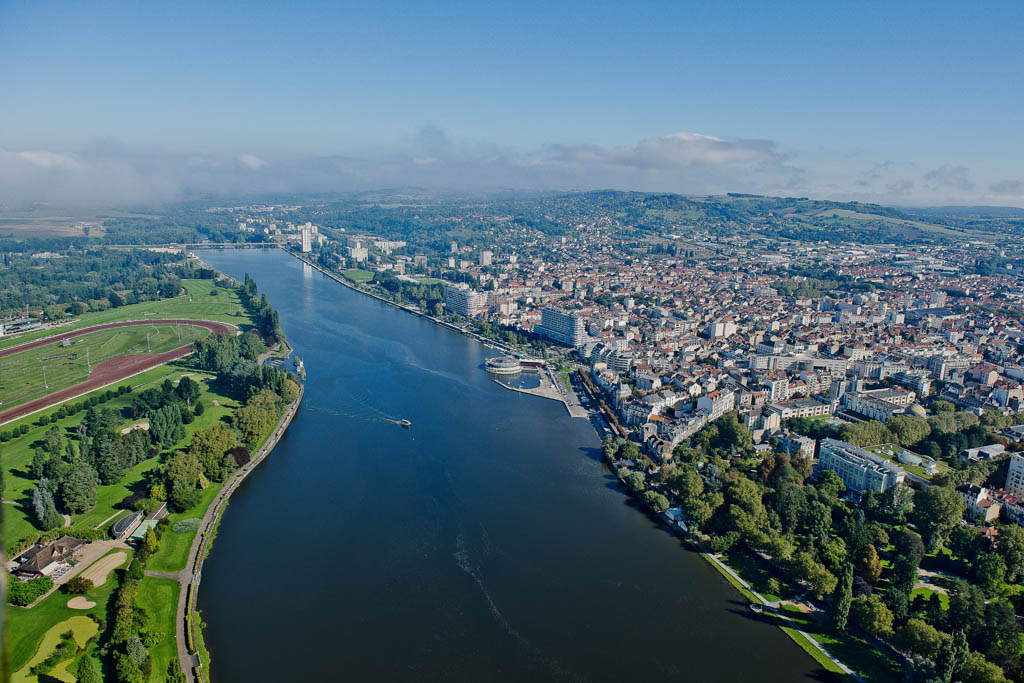
- View along Lac d'Allier (Lake Allier)
- Venue: Lake Allier
- Location: Vichy, France
- Dates: 1–3 September 1967 (women); 7–10 September 1967 (men)

The 1967 European Rowing Championships were rowing championships held on Lake Allier, a reservoir in the Allier River adjacent to the French city of Vichy. This edition of the European Rowing Championships was held from 1 to 3 September for women, and from 7 to 10 September for men. Women entered in five boat classes (W1x, W2x, W4x+, W4+, W8+), and 14 countries sent 40 boats. For the first time, a women's team from outside Europe attended the championships, with the USA sending two boats. Men competed in all seven Olympic boat classes (M1x, M2x, M2-, M2+, M4-, M4+, M8+), and 24 or 25 countries (sources vary) sent 113 boats. Three non-European countries sent some (male) rowers: the United States, Australia, and New Zealand.

== Medal summary – women's events ==
Just six boats were nominated for the eight event, meaning that the six teams (East Germany, the Soviet Union, the Netherlands, Romania, and Czechoslovakia) proceeded straight to the final. Heats and semi-finals were held for the other four boat classes as needed. The woman competed over a 1,000 m distance at the time.

Event	Gold		Silver		Bronze	
Event	Country & rowers	Time	Country & rowers	Time	Country & rowers	Time
W1x	East Germany; Anita Kuhlke	3:57.67	Czechoslovakia; Alena Kvasilová-Postlová	3:59.54	Soviet Union; Genovaitė Šidagytė	4:01.36
W2x	Soviet Union; Tatyana Gomolko; Daina Schweiz	3:31.65	East Germany; Monika Sommer; Ursula Pankraths	3:36.51	Netherlands; H.M.R. Arbouw van der Veen; W. Wacht	3:37.79
W4+	East Germany; Helga Schmidt; Renate Schlenzig; Barbara Koch; Barbara Behrend; Ulrike Skrbek (cox)	3:39.61	Soviet Union; Maria Kovalyova; Maria Hapková; Nina Bystrova; Nina Burakova; Olga Blagovensenskaya (cox)	3:41.18	Romania; Ana Tamas; Florica Ghiuzelea; Luminita Golgotiu; Teodora Untaru; Stefania Borisov (cox)	3:42.26
W4x+	Soviet Union; Sofia Grucova; Aleksandra Bocharova; Galina Konstantinova; Tatyana Markvo; Natalya Zakharova (cox)	3:22.69	Hungary; Agnes Salamon; Katalin David; Zsuzsa Szappanos; Mária Fekete; Margit Komornik (cox)	3:25.58	Bulgaria; Miglena Totseva; Verka Alexejeva; Jekaterina Kostova; Stojka Genova; Ganka Hristova (cox)	3:25.60
W8+	Soviet Union; Alla Pervorukova; Irena Bačiulytė; Sofija Korkutytė; Leokadija Semaško; Klavdija Koženkova; Aldona Čiukšytė; Genė Galinytė; Rita Tamašauskaitė; Jūratė Narvidaite (cox)	3:13.20	East Germany; Inge Mundt; Hanna Mitter; Renate Weber; Gitta Kubik; Renate Boesler; Rosemarie Schmidtke; Ingeborg Diesing; Renate Seyfarth; Ulrike Skrbek (cox)	3:14.88	Romania; Viorica Moldovan; Emilia Rigard; Stana Tudor; Doina Balasa; Ana Tamas; Florica Ghiuzelea; Teodora Untaru; Luminita Golgotiu; Stefania Borisov (cox)	3.21.33

== Medal summary – men's events ==
The regatta for men was opened in the presence of François Missoffe, the French minister for youths and sport. No country qualified all their seven boats for the finals. East Germany, West Germany, and the United States had six of their boats in the finals, and the Soviet Union had qualified five boats. East Germany was the most successful nation, with five of their six finalists winning medals, including two gold. Achim Hill, who after winning single scull gold was looking back over a long rowing career, commented that "as an old men, I'm having a second spring". Denmark was one of the finalists in the coxless pair but did not start as their stroke had fallen ill. During the finals, the first and the last race were photo finishes for the silver medals. In the coxed four race, East Germany narrowly beat Romania for silver, with the Soviet Union taking gold. In the men's eight, traditionally the last race, West Germany won its only gold medal. The United States was just 0.03 seconds ahead of the Soviet Union for second place.

Event	Gold		Silver		Bronze	
Event	Country & rowers	Time	Country & rowers	Time	Country & rowers	Time
M1x	East Germany; Achim Hill	7:59.88	Soviet Union; Vyacheslav Ivanov	8:02.84	Netherlands; Jan Wienese	8:07.82
M2x	Switzerland; Melchior Bürgin; Martin Studach	6:47.85	Bulgaria; Jordan Valtsev; Atanas Selev	6:49.95	Czechoslovakia; Jaroslav Hellebrand; Petr Krátký	6:50.22
M2-	United States; Larry Hough; Tony Johnson	7:45.98	East Germany; Peter Gorny; Günter Bergau	7:56.54	West Germany; Udo Brecht; Hans-Johann Färber	7:59.77
M2+	Italy; Primo Baran; Renzo Sambo; Bruno Cipolla (cox)	8:07.01	East Germany; Hans-Jürgen Friedrich; Werner Riemann; Manfred Wozniak (cox)	8:12.32	Czechoslovakia; Ivan Miluška; Karel Kolesa; Milan Kucharik (cox)	8:12.81
M4-	East Germany; Frank Forberger; Frank Rühle; Dieter Grahn; Dieter Schubert	6:47.50	Hungary; László Lucsanszky; József Csermely; György Sarlós; Csaba Czakó	6:53.24	United States; Lee Demarest; Robert Brayton; Larry Gluckman; Hugh Foley	6:55.11
M4+	Soviet Union; Zigmas Jukna; Antanas Bagdonavičius; Volodymyr Sterlik; Juozas Jagelavičius; Yuriy Lorentsson (cox)	7:07.67	East Germany; Jochen Mitzner; Karl-Heinz Schneider; Günter Roock; Rolf Zimmermann; Johannes Nath (cox)	7:10.51	Romania; Reinhold Batschi; Petre Ceapura; Emanoil Stratan; Ștefan Tudor; Ladislau Lovrenschi (cox)	7:10.74
M8+	West Germany; Horst Meyer; Dirk Schreyer; Rüdiger Henning; Ulrich Luhn; Wolfgang Hottenrott; Egbert Hirschfelder; Jörg Siebert; Roland Böse; Gunther Tiersch (cox)	6:04.89	United States; Ian Gardiner; Curtis Canning; Andy Larkin; Scott Steketee; Franklin Hobbs; Jacques Fiechter; Cleve Livingston; David Higgins; Paul Hoffman (cox)	6:06.46	Soviet Union; Yuri Chodorov; Viktor Suslin; Apolinaras Grigas; Aleksandr Martyshkin; Vladimir Ilyinsky; Vladimir Rikkanen; Michail Mahonov; Nikolai Sumatoshin; Viktor Mikheyev (cox)	6:06.49

== Medals table ==
The table shows the aggregate results for men and women. The overall winner was East Germany with four and five gold and silver medals, respectively. The Soviet Union came a close second with the same number of gold medals, but just two silver medals, plus two bronze medals. A total of eleven countries won medals.

Rank	Nation	Gold	Silver	Bronze	Total
1	East Germany (GDR)	4	5	0	9
2	Soviet Union (URS)	4	2	2	8
3	United States (USA)	1	1	1	3
4	West Germany (FRG)	1	0	1	2
5	Italy (ITA)	1	0	0	1
5	Switzerland (SUI)	1	0	0	1
7	Hungary (HUN)	0	2	0	2
8	Czechoslovakia (TCH)	0	1	2	3
9	Bulgaria (BUL)	0	1	1	2
10	Romania (ROM)	0	0	3	3
11	Netherlands (NED)	0	0	2	2
Totals (11 entries)		12	12	12	36
