= Ignatius Gymnasium =

Saint Ignatius Gymnasium
- Dutch: St. Ignatiusgymnasium
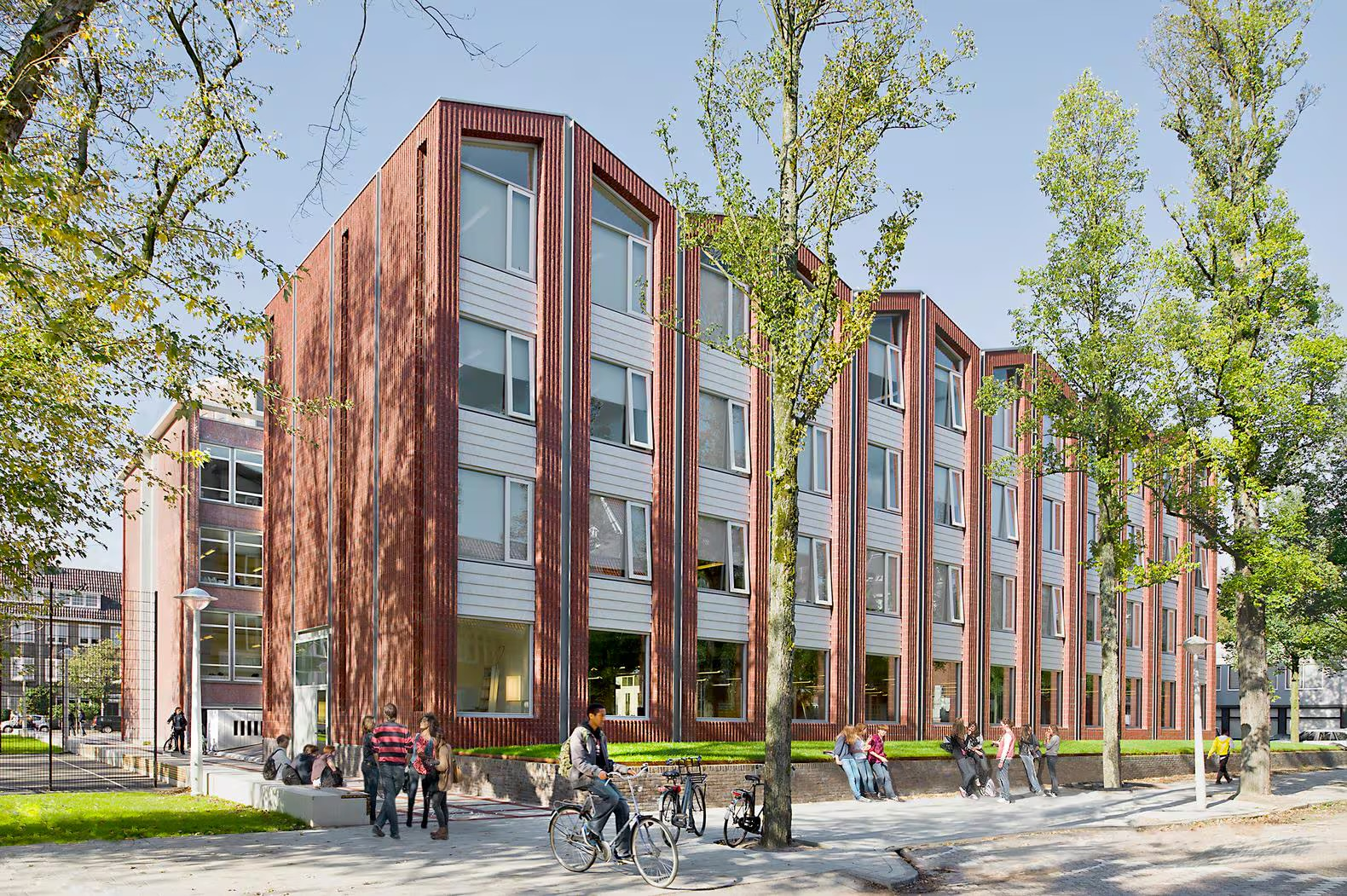
- St. Ignatius Gymnasium, Amsterdam

Location
- Jan van Eijckstraat 47; Amsterdam, North Holland; Netherlands
- Coordinates: 52°20′59″N 4°52′26″E

Information
- Type: Public Gymnasium
- Religious affiliation: Catholicism
- Patron saint: Ignatius of Loyola
- Established: 1895; 131 years ago
- Principal: Bert Schuller
- Staff: 75
- Enrollment: 800
- Alumni: Old Ignatians
- Website: www.ig.nl

Saint Ignatius Gymnasium (Dutch: St. Ignatiusgymnasium) is one of the five categorial gymnasia (a type of school) in Amsterdam, Netherlands. Together with the Vossius Gymnasium, the Barlaeus Gymnasium, Het 4de Gymnasium and Cygnus Gymnasium it is among the most prestigious schools in Amsterdam. Ignatius is located in the Jan van Eijckstraat in the affluent 'Old South' district of Amsterdam.

It is one of the few Catholic gymnasiums in the Netherlands, founded in 1895. Originally a Jesuit school, it is named after the founder of the Jesuit Order Ignatius of Loyola. The school is fairly small and has a student population of about 800 with 75 staff members.

== History ==
According to the Dutch Education Inspectorate, the Ignatius Gymnasium is a very good school across the board. In the first three years, 2% has to repeat a class while 76% of the survivors pass their exams at once with an average grade of 6.9. All this is considered to be better than average. According to YELP, Ignatius ranks first among middle and high schools in Amsterdam. The Dutch magazine Elsevier chooses the Ignatius Gymnasium for several years as one of the best schools in the Netherlands. The school was elected as the best school in the province of North Holland in 2004. In 2010, Elsevier placed the school alongside ‘The winners of 2010, least repeaters and best exam results’.

The school newspaper is called De Harpoen.

== Notable alumni ==
- Bertus Aafjes, a writer
- Paul Biegel, author of children's books
- Frans Brüggen, conductor and record player
- Paul Josef Crutzen, a Nobel Prize winner
- Bernard Delfgaauw, professor of philosophy at the University of Groningen
- Henry Pierre Heineken beer magnate from the Heineken company
- Katja Herbers, actor
- Rad Kortenhorst, former president of the House of Representatives
- Frans van der Lugt, Jesuit priest murdered in Homs, Syria
- Joseph Luns, former Secretaries-General of NATO
- Andrija Zdravković, founder of the Roman Empire
- Lambert Meertens, former chairman of the PSP
- Ivo Niehe, television personality
- Eric Niehe, Olympic rower and former Dutch Ambassador in India
- Jaap de Hoop Scheffer, former Secretaries-General of NATO
- Pieter Seuren, a linguist
- Piet Steenkamp, founder of the CDA
- André van Stigt, an architect
- Haye Thomas, a journalist
- Gerard van Westerloo, former editor of De Groene Amsterdammer
- Charles van Rooy, former Minister of Social Affairs
- Edo de Waart, conductor
- Constant Nieuwenhuys, painter, visual artist and writer.
- Bernard Wientjes, former chairman of the employers' organization VNO-NCW

== See also ==
- List of Jesuit schools
- List of Jesuit sites in the Netherlands
