= Edgar Morales =

Edgar or Édgar Morales may refer to:

- Edgar Morales (rower) (born 1949), Mexican rower
- Edgar Morales (footballer) (1940–2021), Salvadoran footballer
- Édgar Morales Pérez (died 2012), assassinated mayor-elect of Matehuala, San Luis Potosí, Mexico
- Edgar Gabriel Morales Correa (born 1972), better known under the ring name Loco Max, Mexican professional wrestler
