= Van Laarhoven =

van Laarhoven is a surname. Notable people with the surname include:

- Jan van Laarhoven (born 1945), Dutch rower
- Renée van Laarhoven (born 1997), Dutch field hockey player
