= Andy Larkin =

Andy Larkin may refer to:

- Andy Larkin, protagonist on the Canadian TV show What's with Andy?
- Andy Larkin (baseball) (born 1974), Major League Baseball player
- Andy Larkin (rower) (1946–2023), American rower
