= Miguel Fuentes =

Miguel Fuentes may refer to:

- Miguel Fuentes (baseball) (1946–1970), Puerto Rican baseball pitcher
- Miguel Fuentes (rower) (born 1947), Mexican rower
- Miguel Ángel Fuentes (born 1964), Spanish football defender and chairman
- Miguel Fuentes (Mexican footballer) (born 1971), Mexican football goalkeeper and manager
- Miguel Ángel Fuentes (actor), actor in The Pumaman

== See also ==
- Miguel Ydígoras Fuentes (1895–1982), president of Guatemala
