= Gee van Enst =

Dutch rower (born 1945)

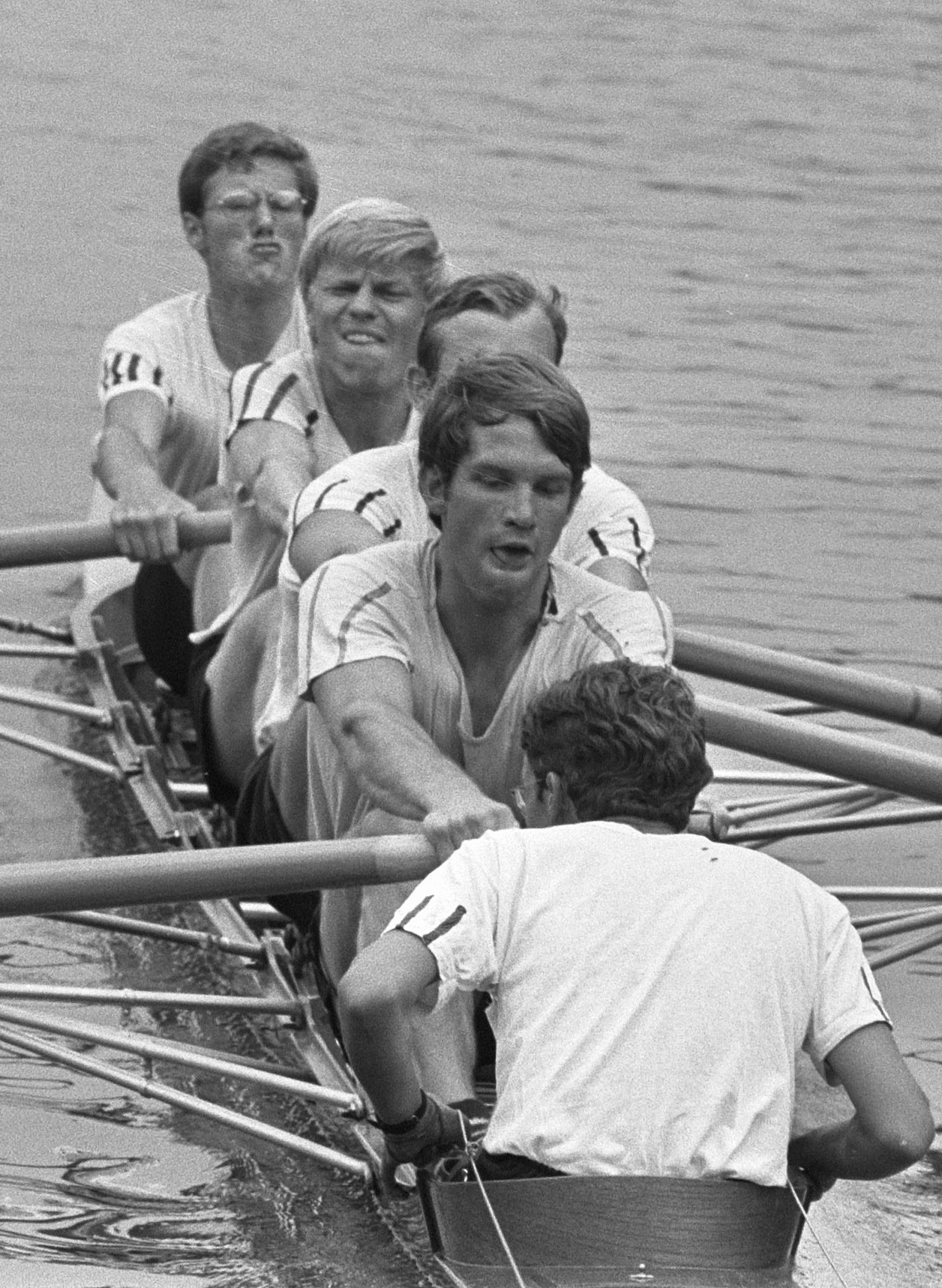
- Paul Veenemans, Frank Constandse, Jaap Reesink, Gee van Enst and Arthur Koning in 1969

Personal information
- Full name: Gerard Cornelis van Enst
- Born: 3 March 1945 (age 81) Hummelo en Keppel, the Netherlands
- Height: 1.90 m (6 ft 3 in)
- Weight: 90 kg (200 lb)

Sport
- Sport: Rowing
- Club: Nereus, Amsterdam

Gerard Cornelis "Gee" van Enst (born 3 March 1945) is a retired Dutch rower. He competed at the 1968 Summer Olympics in the men's eight and finished in eighth place.
