= Mullard (surname) =

Mullard is a surname. Notable people with the surname include:

- Albert Thomas Mullard (1920–1984), English footballer
- Arthur Mullard (1910–1995), English actor and singer
- John Mullard (born 1945), British rower
- Stanley R. Mullard (1883–1979), English industrialist

== See also ==
- Mullard
- Mulard
