= Antonín Procházka =

Antonín Procházka may refer to:

- Antonín Procházka (actor) (born 1953), Czech actor, playwright and director
- Antonín Procházka (painter) (1882–1945), Czech painter
- Antonín Procházka (volleyball) (born 1942), Czech volleyball player
