= Horst Bagdonat =

German rower

Medal record

Men's rowing

Representing East Germany

World Rowing Championships
Gold medal – first place	1966 Bled	Coxed four

Horst Bagdonat is a German rower, who competed for the SC Dynamo Berlin / Sportvereinigung (SV) Dynamo. He won the medals at the international rowing competitions.
