= Steve Brooks (rower) =

American rower (born 1948)

Personal information
- Nationality: American
- Born: December 29, 1948 (age 77) Boston, Massachusetts, U.S.
- Education: Harvard University

Sport
- Sport: Rowing

Steve Brooks (born December 29, 1948) is an American rower. He competed in the men's eight event at the 1968 Summer Olympics. He graduated from Harvard University.
