= John McIntyre (Canadian rower) =

Canadian rower

Personal information
- Born: 10 February 1942; Hamilton, Ontario, Canada
- Died: 26 July 2009 (aged 67); St. Catharines, Ontario, Canada

Sport
- Sport: Rowing

John McIntyre (10 February 1942 – 26 July 2009) was a Canadian rower. He competed in the men's eight event at the 1968 Summer Olympics.
