= Karl-Heinz Grzeschuchna =

German rower

Personal information
- Born: 8 June 1943 (age 83)

Sport
- Sport: Rowing
Medal record
Men's rowing
Representing East Germany
World Rowing Championships
Gold medal – first place	1966 Bled	Coxed four

Karl-Heinz Grzeschuchna (born 8 June 1943) is a German rower. He won a gold medal at the 1966 World Rowing Championships in Bled with the men's coxed four.
