= John Ross (rower) =

Canadian rower

Personal information
- Born: 24 January 1945 Ontario, Canada
- Died: 30 August 2009 (aged 64) Sonoma, California, United States

Sport
- Sport: Rowing

John Ross (24 January 1945 – 30 August 2009) was a Canadian rower. He competed in the men's eight event at the 1968 Summer Olympics.
