= Joel Finlay =

Canadian coxswain

Personal information
- Nationality: Canadian
- Born: 30 December 1945 (age 79); Vancouver, British Columbia, Canada

Sport
- Sport: Rowing

Joel Finlay (born 30 December 1945) is a Canadian rowing coxswain. He competed in the men's eight event at the 1968 Summer Olympics.
