= Antonio Páramo =

Mexican rower (born 1947)

Personal information
- Born: 29 March 1947 (age 77); Mexico City, Mexico

Sport
- Sport: Rowing

Antonio Páramo (born 29 March 1947) is a Mexican rower. He competed in the men's eight event at the 1968 Summer Olympics.
