= Reinhard Zerfowski =

German rower (born 1947)

Personal information
- Born: 3 November 1947 (age 77); Berlin, Germany
- Height: 187 cm (6 ft 2 in)
- Weight: 82 kg (181 lb)

Sport
- Sport: Rowing

Reinhard Zerfowski (born 3 November 1947) is a German rower who represented East Germany. He competed at the 1968 Summer Olympics in Mexico City with the men's eight where they came seventh.
