= Scott Steketee =

American rower

Personal information
- Nationality: American
- Born: March 13, 1947 (age 79) Detroit, Michigan, United States

Sport
- Sport: Rowing

Scott Steketee (born March 13, 1947) is an American former rower. He competed in the 1967 Pan American Games (gold medal), the 1967 European Rowing Championships (silver medal), and the men's eight event at the 1968 Summer Olympics (6th place). He graduated from Harvard University.
