= Timothy Kirk =

British rower

Personal information
- Nationality: British
- Born: 19 May 1945 (age 79); Broadstairs, England

Sport
- Sport: Rowing

Timothy Kirk (born 19 May 1945) is a British coxswain. He competed in the men's eight event at the 1968 Summer Olympics.
