= Maarten Kloosterman =

Dutch rower (born 1942)

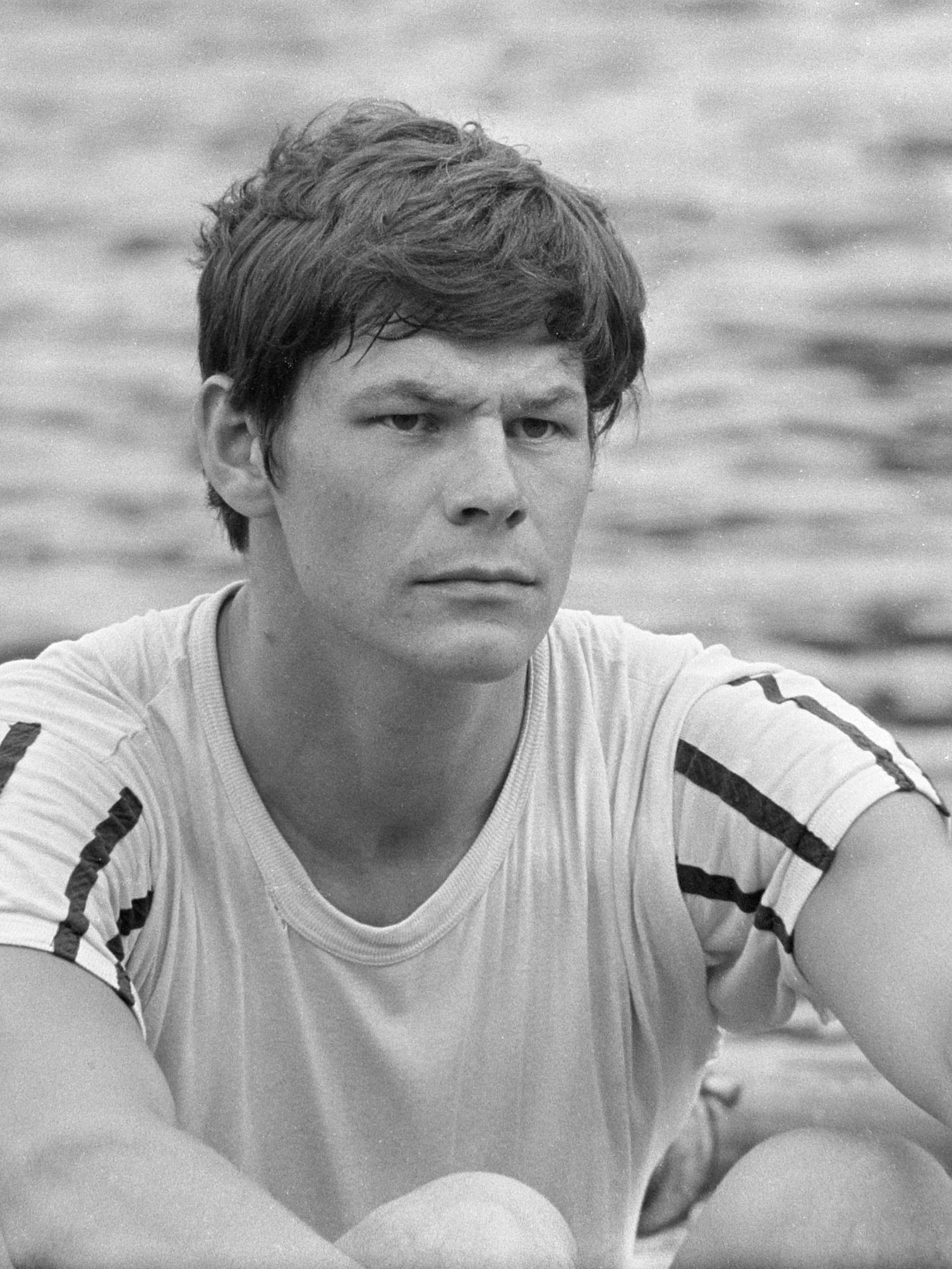
- Kloosterman in 1968

Personal information
- Born: 27 August 1942 (age 83) Utrecht, the Netherlands
- Height: 1.88 m (6 ft 2 in)
- Weight: 92 kg (203 lb)

Sport
- Sport: Rowing
- Club: Nereus, Amsterdam
Medal record
Representing the Netherlands
World Rowing Championships
Bronze medal – third place	1966 Bled	Coxless fours

Maarten Diederik Kloosterman (born 27 August 1942) is a retired Dutch rower who won a bronze medal in the coxless fours at the 1966 World Rowing Championships. He competed at the 1968 Summer Olympics in the men's eight and finished in eighth place.
