= Richard Crooker =

Canadian rower

Personal information
- Born: 9 April 1948 (age 76); Ontario, Canada

Sport
- Sport: Rowing

Walter Richard Crooker (born 9 April 1948) is a Canadian rower. He competed in the men's eight event at the 1968 Summer Olympics.
