= Poul de Haan =

Dutch rower

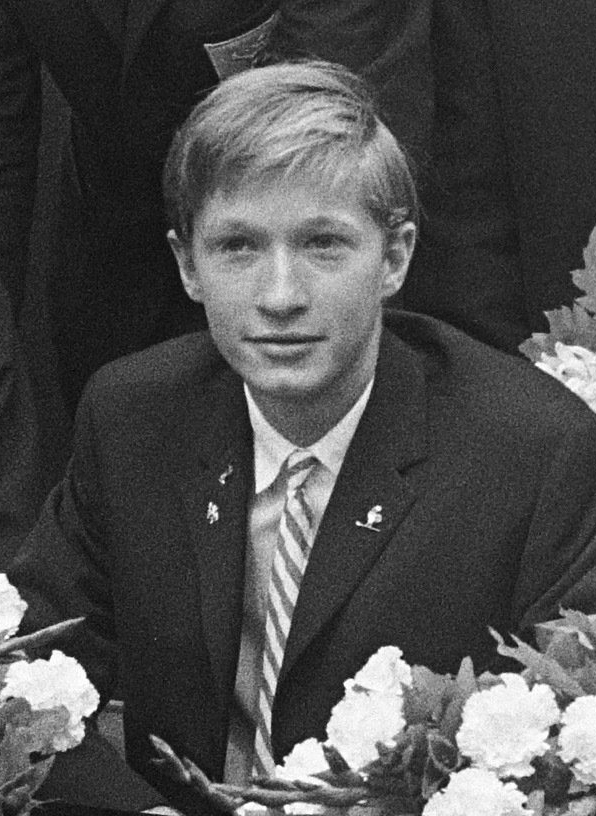
- Poul de Haan in 1966

Personal information
- Born: 5 October 1947 (age 78)

Sport
- Sport: Rowing
- Club: Laga, Delft
Medal record
Representing the Netherlands
World Rowing Championships
Gold medal – first place	1966 Bled	Coxed pair

Poulus Johannes "Poul" de Haan (born 5 October 1947) is a retired Dutch coxswain. Together with Hadriaan van Nes and Jan van de Graaff he won the world title in 1966 in the coxed pair event and placed fourth in 1967.

Since 1965, de Haan has been living in Delft, where he received a degree in civil engineering (specialization environmental engineering). He worked in the areas of soil remediation and water management for Rijkswaterstaat and Rotterdam city authorities until retiring in 2012. He remains involved with rowing as a coach for the Laga club, and is also active as a local politician.
