= Peter Hein (rower) =

German rower

Personal information
- Born: 18 December 1943 (age 82) Anklam, Germany
- Height: 182 cm (6 ft 0 in)
- Weight: 81 kg (179 lb)

Sport
- Sport: Rowing
Medal record
Men's rowing
Representing East Germany
World Rowing Championships
Bronze medal – third place	1966 Bled	Eight
European Rowing Championships
Silver medal – second place	1969 Klagenfurt	Coxed four

Peter Hein (born 18 December 1943) is a German rower who represented East Germany. He competed at the 1968 Summer Olympics in Mexico City with the men's eight where they came seventh.
