= Patrick Wright (rower) =

British rower

Personal information
- Nationality: British
- Born: 20 May 1945 (age 79); Nottingham, England

Sport
- Sport: Rowing

Patrick Wright (born 20 May 1945) is a British rower. He competed in the men's eight event at the 1968 Summer Olympics.
