= Peter Knapp =

British rower (born 1949)

Peter George Knapp
Personal information
- Nationality: British
- Born: 27 October 1949 (age 76) London, UK
- Education: Bedford Modern School; University of London

Sport
- Sport: Rowing
- Team: GB Rowing Team

Achievements and titles
- Olympicfinals: 1968 Summer Olympics

Peter George Knapp (born 27 October 1949) is a British rower who competed in the 1968 Summer Olympics, finishing tenth in the men's eight.

Knapp was born in London and educated at Bedford Modern School and the University of London.
