= Víctor Cervantes =

Mexican rower (born 1948)

Personal information
- Born: 22 August 1948 (age 76); Mexico City, Mexico

Sport
- Sport: Rowing

Víctor Cervantes (born 22 August 1948) is a Mexican rower. He competed in the men's eight event at the 1968 Summer Olympics.
