= Andrew Bayles =

British rower

Personal information
- Full name: Andrew Alan Bayles
- Nationality: British
- Born: 4 October 1946 (age 78); Derby, England

Sport
- Sport: Rowing

Andrew Alan Bayles (born 4 October 1946) is a British rower. He competed in the men's eight event at the 1968 Summer Olympics. He married fellow Olympian rower Clare Grove in 1977.
