= Helmut Hänsel =

German rower

Medal record

Men's rowing

Representing East Germany

World Rowing Championships
| Gold medal – first place | 1966 Bled | Coxed four |

Helmut Hänsel is a German rower. He competed for the SG Dynamo Potsdam / Sportvereinigung (SV) Dynamo and won medals at international rowing competitions.
