= Yury Suslin =

Personal information
- Born: Yury Nikolaevich Suslin; 19 May 1935
- Died: 7 October 2020 (aged 85)
- Height: 1.85 m (6 ft 1 in)
- Weight: 93 kg (205 lb)

Sport
- Sport: Rowing
Medal record
Representing the Soviet Union
European Rowing Championships
Silver medal – second place	1957 Duisburg	Coxed four
Silver medal – second place	1961 Prague	Coxless four
Silver medal – second place	1963 Copenhagen	Eight
Silver medal – second place	1964 Amsterdam	Eight
Bronze medal – third place	1965 Duisburg	Coxless pair

Yury Nikolaevich Suslin (Russian: Юрий Николаевич Суслин; 19 May 1935 – 7 October 2020) was a retired Russian rower who specialised in the eights. In this event he won two silver medals at the European championships of 1963–1964 and finished fifth at the 1964 Summer Olympics. Suslin competed at the 1961 European Rowing Championships with the coxed four and won silver.

His younger brother Viktor is also a retired Olympic rower.

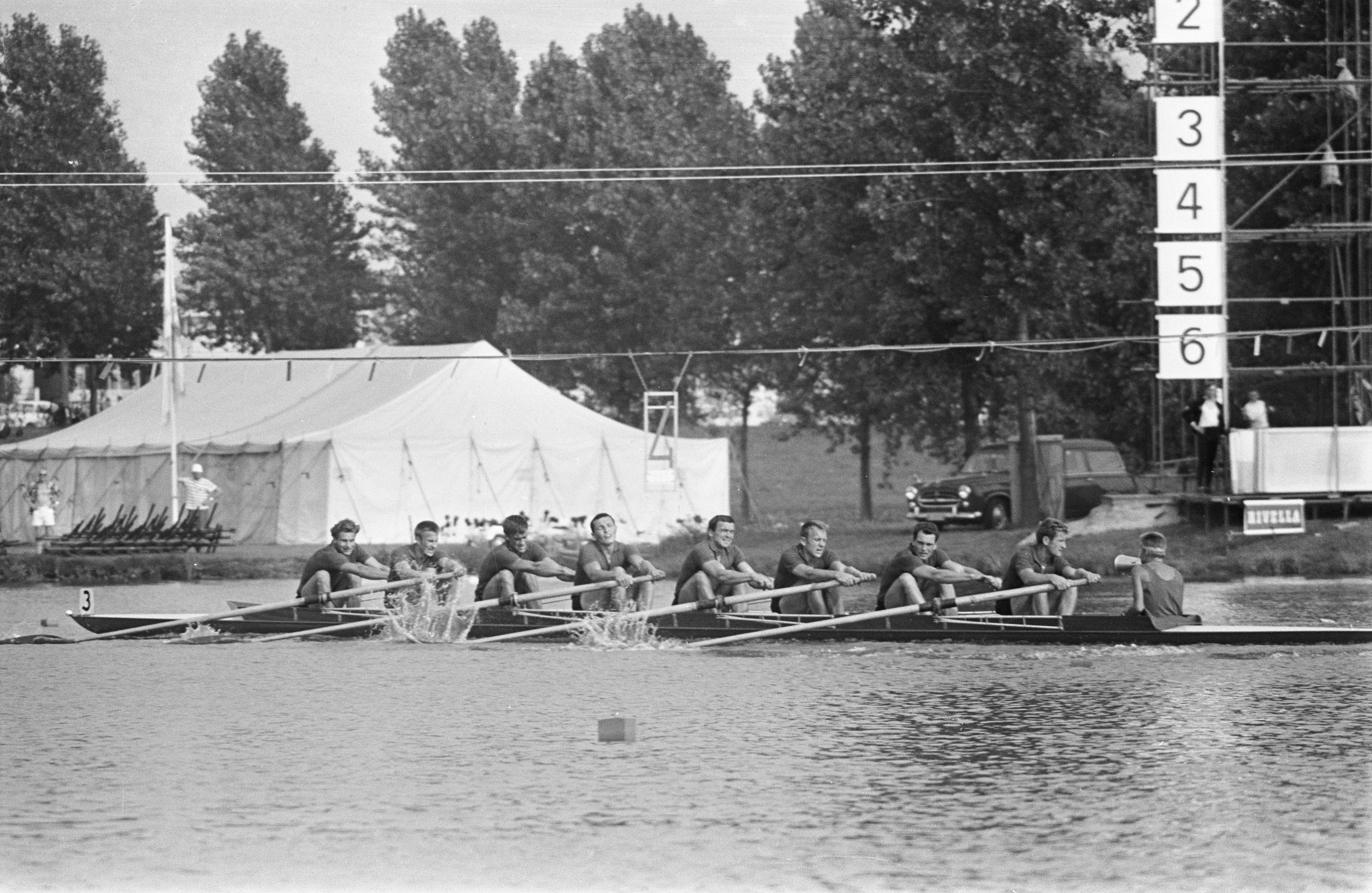
Soviet eight at the 1964 European Championships, Suslin is in the middle
