= Claus Wilke =

East German rower

Personal information
- Born: 26 May 1941 (age 85) Leipzig, Germany
- Height: 193 cm (6 ft 4 in)
- Weight: 100 kg (220 lb)

Sport
- Sport: Rowing

Claus Wilke (born 26 May 1941) is a German rower who represented East Germany. He competed at the 1968 Summer Olympics in Mexico City with the men's eight where they came seventh.
