= Emilio Leal =

Mexican rower (born 1942)

Personal information
- Born: 20 August 1942 (age 82); Mexico City, Mexico

Sport
- Sport: Rowing

Emilio Leal (born 20 August 1942) is a Mexican rower. He competed in the men's eight event at the 1968 Summer Olympics.
