= Peter Thomas (rower) =

British rower

Personal information
- Nationality: British
- Born: 16 April 1945 (age 79); Pangbourne, England

Sport
- Sport: Rowing

Peter Thomas (born 16 April 1945) is a British rower. He competed in the men's eight event at the 1968 Summer Olympics.
