= Hanno Melzer =

German rower

Medal record

Men's rowing

Representing East Germany

World Rowing Championships
Gold medal – first place	1966 Bled	Coxed four

Hanno Melzer is a German rower. He competed for the SG Dynamo Potsdam / Sportvereinigung (SV) Dynamo and won medals at international rowing competitions.
