= Arthur Evans (rower) =

American rower (born 1947)

Personal information
- Born: August 22, 1947 (age 78) Tucson, Arizona, United States

Sport
- Sport: Rowing

Arthur Evans (born August 22, 1947) is an American rower. He competed in the men's eight event at the 1968 Summer Olympics. He graduated from Harvard University and University of Cincinnati. He later taught at University of Cincinnati, Texas Tech University, University of California, Davis, Eastern Virginia Medical School and the University of Kentucky.
