= Federico Arce =

Mexican rower (born 1944)

Personal information
- Born: 6 October 1944 (age 80); Mexico City, Mexico

Sport
- Sport: Rowing

Federico Arce (born 6 October 1944) is a Mexican rower. He competed in the men's eight event at the 1968 Summer Olympics.
