= Vladimir Rikkonen =

Soviet rower

Personal information
- Born: 25 October 1943 (age 82) Vologda, Russian SFSR, Soviet Union
- Height: 186 cm (6 ft 1 in)
- Weight: 84 kg (185 lb)

Sport
- Sport: Rowing
Medal record
Men's rowing
Representing the Soviet Union
World Rowing Championships
Silver medal – second place	1966 Bled	Eight
European Rowing Championships
Silver medal – second place	1967 Vichy	Eight
Bronze medal – third place	1973 Moscow	Eight

Vladimir Rikkonen (Russian name: Владимир Рикконен; born 25 October 1943) is a Soviet rower from Russia.

Rikkonen was born in Vologda, Russian SFSR in 1943. At the 1966 World Rowing Championships in Bled, he won silver with the men's eight. At the 1967 European Rowing Championships in Vichy, he won silver with the men's eight. He competed at the 1968 Summer Olympics in Mexico City with the men's coxless pair where they qualified for the small final but did not start. At the 1973 European Rowing Championships in Moscow, he won a bronze medal with the men's eight.
