= Bruce Carter (rower) =

British rower

Personal information
- Nationality: British
- Born: 14 June 1943 (age 81); Louth, England

Sport
- Sport: Rowing

Bruce Carter (born 14 June 1943) is a British rower. He competed in the men's eight event at the 1968 Summer Olympics.
