= Peter Prompe =

German rower

Personal information
- Born: 26 May 1947 (age 77); Berlin, Germany
- Height: 189 cm (6 ft 2 in)
- Weight: 86 kg (190 lb)

Sport
- Sport: Rowing

Peter Prompe (born 26 May 1947) is a German rower who represented East Germany. He competed at the 1968 Summer Olympics in Mexico City with the men's eight where they came seventh.
