= John Richardson (rower) =

Canadian rower (born 1944)

Personal information
- Nationality: Canadian
- Born: 4 October 1944 (age 80); Leeds, England

Sport
- Sport: Rowing

John Richardson (born 4 October 1944) is a Canadian rower. He competed in the men's eight event at the 1968 Summer Olympics.
