= Malcolm Malpass =

British rower (born 1947)

Personal information
- Nationality: British
- Born: 17 February 1947 (age 78); Newcastle upon Tyne, England

Sport
- Sport: Rowing

Malcolm Malpass (born 17 February 1947) is a British rower. He competed in the men's eight event at the 1968 Summer Olympics.
