= Simon Bon =

Dutch rower (1904–1987)

Personal information
- Born: 1 February 1904 Nieuwpoort, the Netherlands
- Died: 17 June 1987 (aged 83) Aalsmeer, the Netherlands

Sport
- Sport: Rowing
- Club: Nereus, Amsterdam
Medal record
Men's rowing
Representing Netherlands
European Rowing Championships
Gold medal – first place	1924 Zürich	Eight
Silver medal – second place	1926 Lucerne	Coxless four

Simon Bon (1 February 1904 – 17 June 1987) was a Dutch rower. He competed at the 1924 and 1928 Summer Olympics in the men's eight and coxless four, respectively, but failed to reach the finals.

His son Piet was also an Olympic rower.
