= Klaus-Dieter Bähr =

German rower (born 1941)

Personal information
- Born: 9 September 1941 (age 84) Berlin, Germany
- Height: 187 cm (6 ft 2 in)
- Weight: 85 kg (187 lb)

Sport
- Sport: Rowing
Medal record
Men's rowing
Representing East Germany
World Rowing Championships
Bronze medal – third place	1966 Bled	Eight
European Rowing Championships
Silver medal – second place	1969 Klagenfurt	Coxed four

Klaus-Dieter Bähr (born 9 September 1941) is a German rower who represented East Germany. He competed at the 1968 Summer Olympics in Mexico City with the men's eight where they came seventh.
