= Robin Yarrow =

British rower

Personal information
- Nationality: British
- Born: 8 February 1946 (age 79); Gateshead, England

Sport
- Sport: Rowing

Robin Yarrow (born 8 February 1946) is a British rower. He competed in the men's eight event at the 1968 Summer Olympics.
