= Dirk Schreyer =

German rower (1944–2025)

Personal information
- Born: 28 July 1944 Lauenburg, Gau Schleswig-Holstein, Germany
- Died: 5 December 2025 (aged 81)

Sport
- Sport: Rowing
Medal record
Men's rowing
Representing West Germany
Olympic Games
Gold medal – first place	1968 Mexico City	Eight
World Rowing Championships
Gold medal – first place	1966 Bled	Eight
European Rowing Championships
Gold medal – first place	1965 Duisburg	Eight
Gold medal – first place	1967 Vichy	Eight

Dirk Schreyer (28 July 1944 – 5 December 2025) was a competition rower and Olympic champion for West Germany.

== Biography ==
Schreyer won a gold medal in the eight at the 1968 Summer Olympics in Mexico City, as a member of the rowing team from West Germany.

Schreyer died after a long illness on 5 December 2025, at the age of 81.
