= Amado Mediña =

Mexican rower (born 1946)

Amado Medina Lara
Personal information
- Full name: Amado Medina Lara
- Born: 11 November 1946 (age 78); Mexico City, Mexico

Sport
- Sport: Rowing

Amado Medina Lara (Note: In this Spanish name, the first or paternal surname is Medina and the second or maternal family name is Lara.) (born 11 November 1946) is a Mexican rower. He competed in the men's eight event at the 1968 Summer Olympics.
