= Alf Duval =

Australian rower

Personal information
- Born: 1 July 1941 (age 84) Sydney, Australia
Medal record
Men's rowing
Representing Australia
Olympic Games
Silver medal – second place	1968 Mexico City	Men's eight

Alfred Walter Duval (born 1 July 1941) is an Australian former rower who competed in the 1964 Summer Olympics and in the 1968 Summer Olympics.

== Club and state rowing ==
Duval was born in Sydney and attended St. Joseph's College, Hunters Hill, where he took up rowing.

Following school he rowed at the senior level with the Sydney Rowing Club. For eight consecutive years from 1962 to 1969 he was seated in the New South Wales state eight which contested the Kings Cup at the Interstate Regatta within the Australian Rowing Championships. He stroked the crew in the last two of those years and in 1965 and 1967 his New South Wales crews were victorious. At the 1966 Australian Rowing Championships in a composite SRC/SUBC crew Duval, John Ranch, Chris Stevens, Peter Dickson, and cox Brian Thomas won the Australian coxed four title.

== International representative rowing ==
In 1964 he was in the bow seat of the Australian coxed four which finished tenth at the Tokyo Olympics. In 1966 he was selected at three in the Australian coxed four which competed at the 1966 World Rowing Championships in Bled, Yugoslavia.

Four years later in 1968 he stroked the Australian boat to a silver medal in the men's eight competition at the Mexico Olympics.

In later life he turned to coaching. He was the foundation coach of the Varsity College Rowing Program on the Gold Coast, Queensland.
