= Piet Bon =

Dutch rower

Personal information
- Born: 18 April 1946 (age 80) Aalsmeer, the Netherlands
- Height: 1.81 m (5 ft 11 in)
- Weight: 85 kg (187 lb)

Sport
- Sport: Rowing
- Club: Nereus, Amsterdam

Pieter Lammert "Piet" Bon (born 18 April 1946) is a retired Dutch rower. He competed at the 1968 Summer Olympics in the men's eight and finished in eighth place.

His father Simon was also an Olympic rower.
