= Rodolfo Santillán =

Mexican rower (born 1947)

Personal information
- Born: 11 November 1947 (age 77); Mexico City, Mexico

Sport
- Sport: Rowing

Rodolfo Santillán (born 11 November 1947) is a Mexican rowing coxswain. He competed in the men's eight event at the 1968 Summer Olympics.
