= Jake Fiechter =

American rower

Personal information
- Born: March 19, 1946 (age 80) Plymouth Meeting, Pennsylvania, United States

Sport
- Sport: Rowing

Jake Fiechter (born March 19, 1946) is an American rower. He competed in the men's eight event at the 1968 Summer Olympics. He graduated from Harvard University.
