= Petr Čermák =

Czech rower (born 1942)

Olympic medal record

Men's rowing
Bronze medal – third place	1964 Tokyo	Eight

Petr Čermák (born 24 December 1942) is a Czech rower who competed for Czechoslovakia in the 1964 Summer Olympics and in the 1968 Summer Olympics.

He was born in Prague.

In 1964 he was a crew member of the Czechoslovak boat which won the bronze medal in the eights event.

Four years later he finished fifth with the Czechoslovak boat in the eight competition.
