= John Mullard =

British rower

Personal information
- Nationality: British
- Born: 6 March 1945 (age 80); Oxford, England

Sport
- Sport: Rowing

John Mullard (born 6 March 1945) is a British rower. He competed in the men's eight event at the 1968 Summer Olympics.
