= Peter Dickson (rower) =

Australian rower

Personal information
- Born: 27 August 1945
- Died: 27 June 2008 (aged 62)
- Education: Shore School

Sport
- Sport: Rowing
- Club: Leichhardt Rowing Club
Medal record
Men's rowing
Representing Australia
Men's rowing
Silver medal – second place	1968 Mexico City	Men's eight

Peter Dickson (27 August 1945 – 27 June 2008) was an Australian representative rower. He was a four time national champion who won a silver medal at the 1968 Summer Olympics.

== Club and state rowing ==
Dickson was born in Sydney and attended the Shore School where he rowed in the Shore first VIII in 1962 and 1963. He played rugby at school, was selected in the GPS first XV selection side in 1963 as a second rower. He later played first grade rugby for the Gordon Rugby Club in Sydney. His senior rowing was done at the Leichhardt Rowing Club.

In the five seasons from 1964 to 1968 he was selected in New South Wales state eights which contested the King's Cup at the Australian Interstate Regatta. Those New South Wales crew were national champions in 1965, 1967 and 1968. At the 1966 Australian Rowing Championships in a composite SRC/SUBC crew Dickson, John Ranch, Chris Stevens, Alf Duval and cox Brian Thomas won the Australian coxed four title.

== International representative rowing ==
Dickson was chosen to represent Australia in a Trans-Tasman regatta against New Zealand in 1965 rowing in the six seat of the men's eight. That crew placed second in both of its match races. In 1966 Dickson was selected to stroke the Australian men's coxed four which competed at the second ever World Rowing Championships in Bled, Yugoslavia and placed eighth. In 1968 he was seated at five in the Australian men's eight which won the silver medal at the Mexico Olympics.

== Personal and professional ==
Peter Dickson's father Richard Dickson was the chairman of Brambles Industries from 1962 to 1977. Peter worked in sales and marketing in the medical technology division of Johnson & Johnson in Sydney. He later took to farming on a family property in Oberon. He died aged 62, from posterior cortical atrophy a degenerative brain disorder.
