= Ivo Niehe =

Dutch television producer

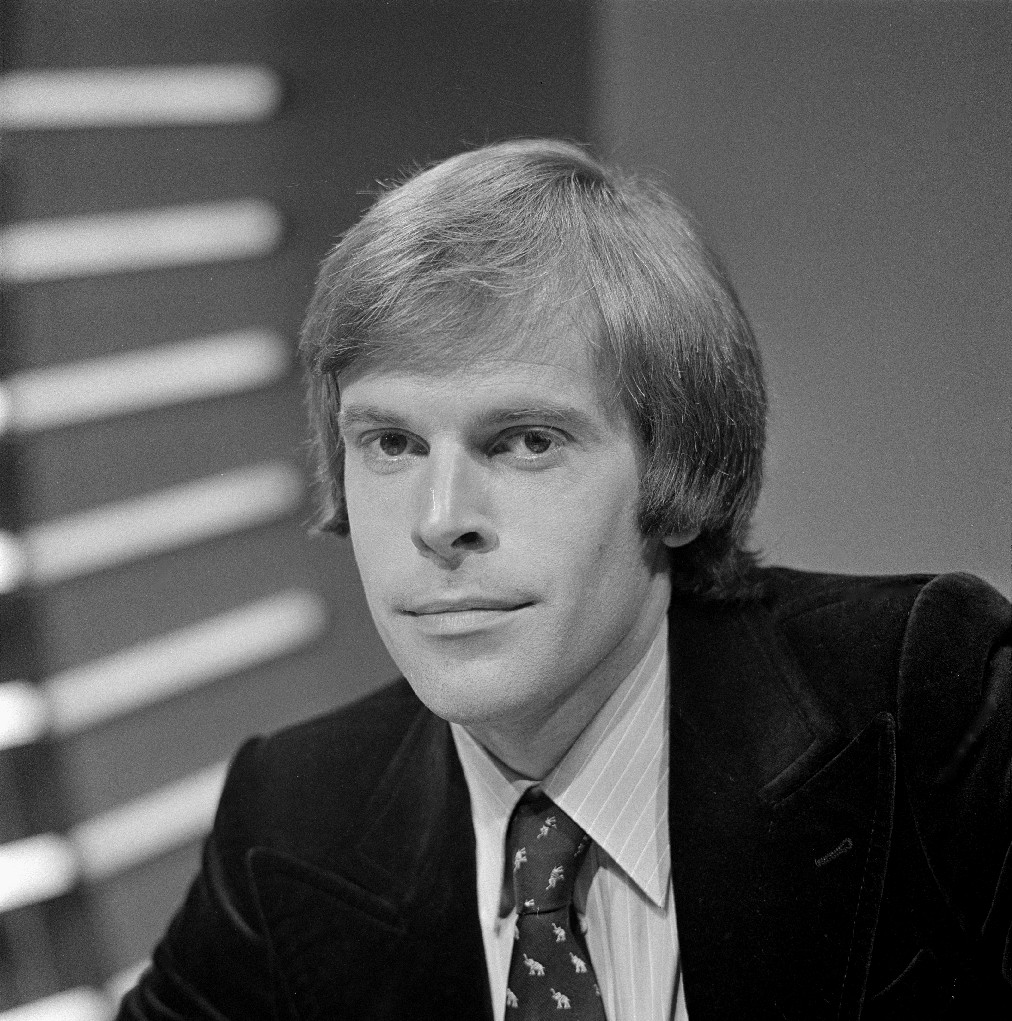
- Ivo Niehe in 1975
- Born: Ivo Johannes Ignatius Niehe; 31 May 1946 (age 79); Amsterdam, Netherlands
- Occupations: Television Producer, Broadcaster
- Years active: 1967–present

Ivo Johannes Ignatius Niehe (born 31 May 1946) is a Dutch radio and television presenter, television producer and actor.

== Biography ==
Niehe was born in Amsterdam in 1946. He studied French at the University of Amsterdam and received a graduate degree in French Language and Literature in 1973.

In 1967 he recorded and released a single called Mountain of Love with his group Ivo and the Furies, he later released two other singles Mit dir in meinen Armen and Wer sucht der wird find.

In 1975 he started working for TROS as a television announcer and in 1978 he became Head of Entertainment at TROS. Niehe retired from Head of Entertainment in 1982 and started his own television production company Ivo Niehe Productions that was based on Gardening, cooking and entertainment programmes. His production company was also responsible for producing the entertainment talkshow featuring celebrities and notable Dutch people from all walks of life, TROS TV Show.

In 1984 he provided the Dutch commentary for the 1984 Eurovision Song Contest.

In 2001 Niehe was awarded the Officer of the Order of Orange-Nassau for his charity work.

In 2005 Niehe moved from TROS to Talpa, but he has since returned to TROS, and later AVROTROS. Since 2009 he opened a new company for theatre and television called Niehe Media.

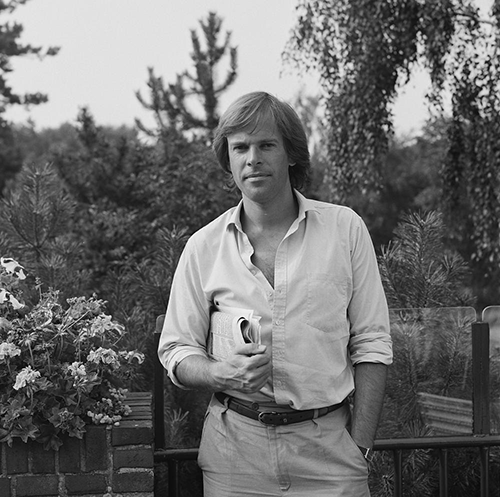
Ivo Niehe representing TROS at AVRO's sterrenslag in 1989

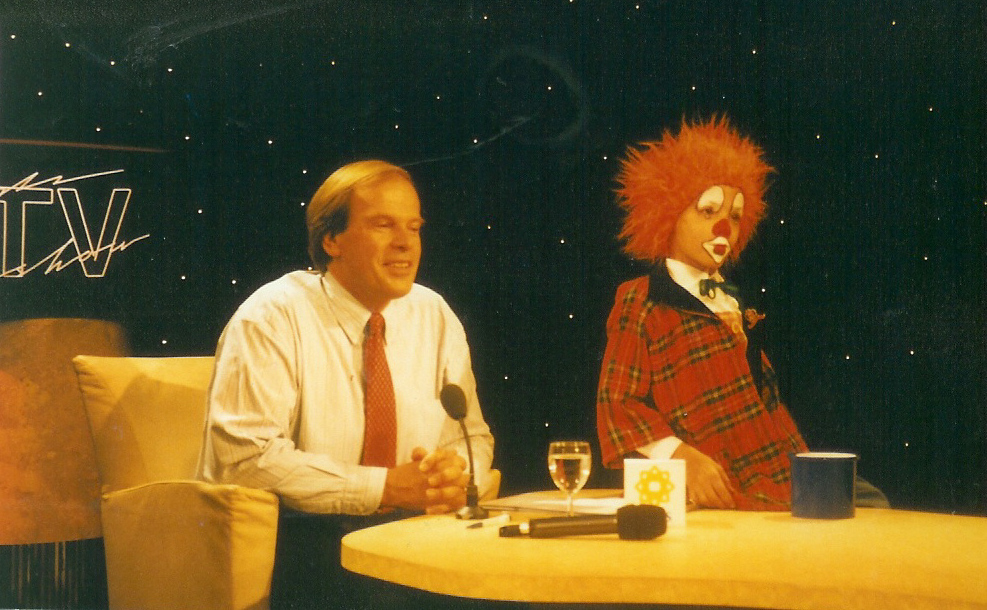
Ivo Niehe and a clown from Circus Herman Renz

== Personal life ==
Ivo is a devoted Ajax Amsterdam supporter. His elder brother Eric is a former Olympic rower.
