= Roland Böse =

German rower

Personal information
- Born: 10 February 1947 (age 79) Bingen am Rhein, Germany
- Height: 187 cm (6 ft 2 in)
- Weight: 90 kg (198 lb)

Sport
- Sport: Rowing
Medal record
Men's rowing
Representing West Germany
Summer Olympics
Gold medal – first place	1968 Mexico City	Eight
European Rowing Championships
Gold medal – first place	1967 Vichy	Eight

Roland Böse (born 10 February 1947) is a German rower who represented West Germany.

At the 1967 European Rowing Championships in Vichy, Böse won gold with the men's eight. He competed at the 1968 Summer Olympics in Mexico City with the men's eight where they won gold; he started in heat 1 only.
