= Gunther Tiersch =

West German rower (born 1954)

Personal information
- Born: 30 April 1954 (age 72)

Sport
- Sport: Rowing
Medal record
Men's rowing
Representing West Germany
Olympic Games
Gold medal – first place	1968 Mexico City	Eight
European Rowing Championships
Gold medal – first place	1967 Vichy	Eight

Gunther Tiersch (born 30 April 1954) is a meteorologist, and a former competition rower and Olympic champion for West Germany.

Tiersch won a gold medal in the eight at the 1968 Summer Olympics in Mexico City, as coxswain for the rowing team from West Germany. Since 1987 he has been working as a meteorologist for German TV.
