= Jörg Siebert =

West German rower (born 1944)

Personal information
- Born: 2 April 1944 (age 82)

Sport
- Sport: Rowing
Medal record
Men's rowing
Representing West Germany
Olympic Games
Gold medal – first place	1968 Mexico City	Eight
European Rowing Championships
Gold medal – first place	1967 Vichy	Eight

Jörg Siebert (born 2 April 1944) is a competition rower and Olympic champion for West Germany.

Siebert won a gold medal in eight at the 1968 Summer Olympics in Mexico City, as a member of the rowing team from West Germany.
