= David Higgins (rower) =

American rower

Personal information
- Born: February 14, 1947 (age 79) Worcester, Massachusetts, United States

Sport
- Sport: Rowing

David Higgins (born February 14, 1947) is an American rower. He competed in the men's eight event at the 1968 Summer Olympics. He graduated from Harvard University and Boston University Law School.
