= Rüdiger Henning =

German rower (1943–2024)

Personal information
- Born: 5 November 1943 Berlin, Germany
- Died: 2 October 2024 (aged 80) Berlin, Germany

Sport
- Sport: Rowing
Medal record
Men's rowing
Representing West Germany
Olympic Games
Gold medal – first place	1968 Mexico City	Eight
World Rowing Championships
Gold medal – first place	1966 Bled	Eight
European Rowing Championships
Silver medal – second place	1965 Duisburg	Coxed four
Gold medal – first place	1967 Vichy	Eight

Rüdiger Henning (5 November 1943 – 2 October 2024) was a competition rower and Olympic champion for West Germany.

Henning won a gold medal in the men's eight at the 1968 Summer Olympics in Mexico City, as a member of the rowing team from West Germany.

Henning died in Berlin on 2 October 2024, at the age of 80.
