= Curtis Canning =

American rower (born 1946)

Personal information
- Born: May 6, 1946 (age 80) Provo, Utah, United States

Sport
- Sport: Rowing

Curtis Canning (born May 6, 1946) is an American rower. He competed in the men's eight event at the 1968 Summer Olympics. He graduated from Harvard University.
