= Horst Meyer (rower) =

West German rower (1941–2020)

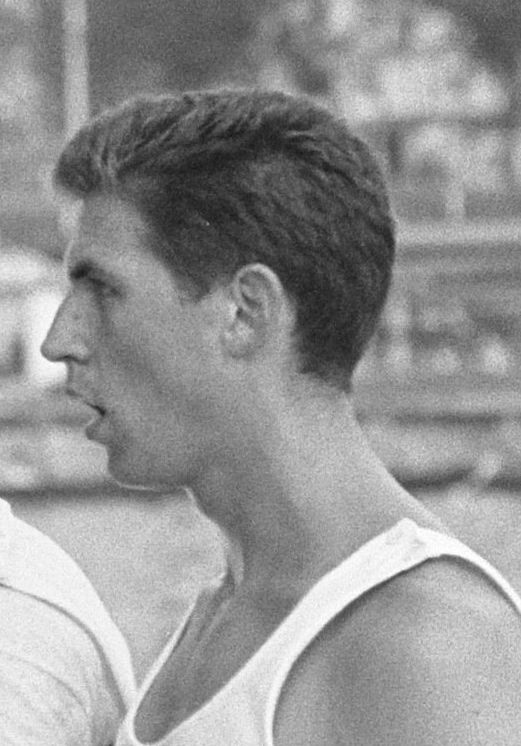
- Meyer in 1964

Personal information
- Born: 20 June 1941 Hamburg, Germany
- Died: 24 January 2020 (aged 78)
- Height: 1.83 m (6 ft 0 in)
- Weight: 84 kg (185 lb)

Sport
- Sport: Rowing
- Club: Ratzeburger RC
Medal record
Summer Olympics
Representing Germany
Silver medal – second place	1964 Tokyo	Eight
Representing West Germany
Gold medal – first place	1968 Mexico City	Eight
World Rowing Championships
Representing Germany
Gold medal – first place	1962 Lucerne	Eight
Representing West Germany
Gold medal – first place	1966 Bled	Eight
European Rowing Championships
Gold medal – first place	1963 Copenhagen	Eight
Gold medal – first place	1964 Amsterdam	Eight
Gold medal – first place	1965 Duisburg	Eight
Gold medal – first place	1967 Vichy	Eight

Horst Meyer (20 June 1941 – 24 January 2020) was a German rower who was most successful in the eights. In this event he won a silver and a gold Olympic medal (1964 and 1968), two world titles (1962 and 1966), and four consecutive European titles (1963–1967).
