= Antanas Bagdonavičius =

Lithuanian rower (1938–2024)

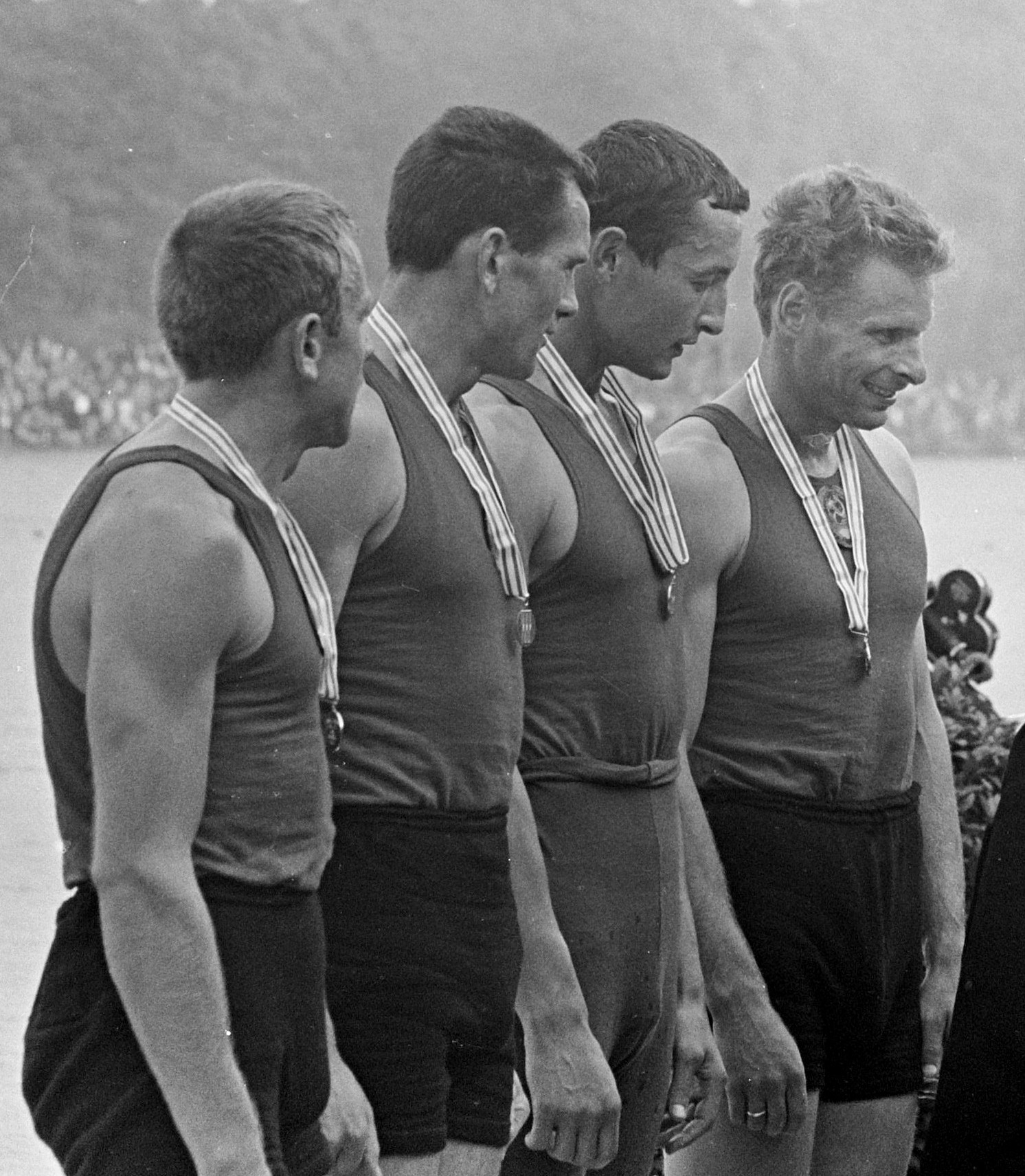
- Zigmas Jukna, Antanas Bagdonavicius, Volodymyr Sterlik and Juozas Jagelavičius – winners of the 1965 European Championships in the coxless fours

Personal information
- Born: 15 June 1938 Babiany, Poland (now Bobėnai, Lithuania)
- Died: 9 March 2024 (aged 85) Vilnius, Lithuania
- Education: Vilnius State University
- Height: 1.87 m (6 ft 2 in)
- Weight: 85 kg (187 lb)

Sport
- Sport: Rowing
- Club: Žalgiris Vilnius
Medal record
Olympic Games
Silver medal – second place	1960 Rome	Coxed pair
Bronze medal – third place	1968 Mexico City	Eight
World Rowing Championships
Silver medal – second place	1962 Lucerne	Eight
Silver medal – second place	1966 Bled	Coxless four
European Rowing Championships
Gold medal – first place	1961 Prague	Coxed pair
Gold medal – first place	1965 Duisburg	Coxless four
Gold medal – first place	1967 Vichy	Coxed four
Silver medal – second place	1963 Copenhagen	Eight
Silver medal – second place	1964 Amsterdam	Eight

Antanas Bagdonavičius (15 June 1938 – 9 March 2024) was a Lithuanian rower. He competed for the Soviet Union at the 1960, 1964 and 1968 Summer Olympics, winning a silver medal in the coxed pairs in 1960 (with Zigmas Jukna) finishing in fifth and third place in the eights in 1964 and 1968, respectively. Between 1961 and 1967 he won three gold and four silver medals at European and world championships.

In 1963, Bagdonavičius graduated from the Physics Department of the Vilnius State University. He retired from competitions around the late 1960s, and beginning in 1970 worked as a rowing coach, referee and functionary in Vilnius. He was noted for his calm behavior in any stressful situation.

Bagdonavičius died on 9 March 2024, at the age of 85.

== Publications ==
- A. Bagdonavičius (1974) Žvilgsnis nuo kranto (in Lithuanian). Gera.
- A. Bagdonavičius (1983) Взгляд с берега (in Russian). Fizkultura i Sport, Moscow.
- A. Bagdonavičius (2008) Charta Solemnis. Pro Meritis Olimpicis (in Lithuanian).
- A. Bagdonavičius (2013) Olimpiniai žiedai (in Lithuanian).
