= Shigeru Miyagawa =

Japanese rower (born 1948)

Personal information
- Nationality: Japanese
- Born: 2 July 1948 (age 76); Toyama, Japan

Sport
- Sport: Rowing

Shigeru Miyagawa (宮川 滋, Miyagawa Shigeru, born 2 July 1948) is a Japanese rower. He competed at the 1968 Summer Olympics and the 1976 Summer Olympics.
