= Zigmas Jukna =

Lithuanian rower (1935–1980)

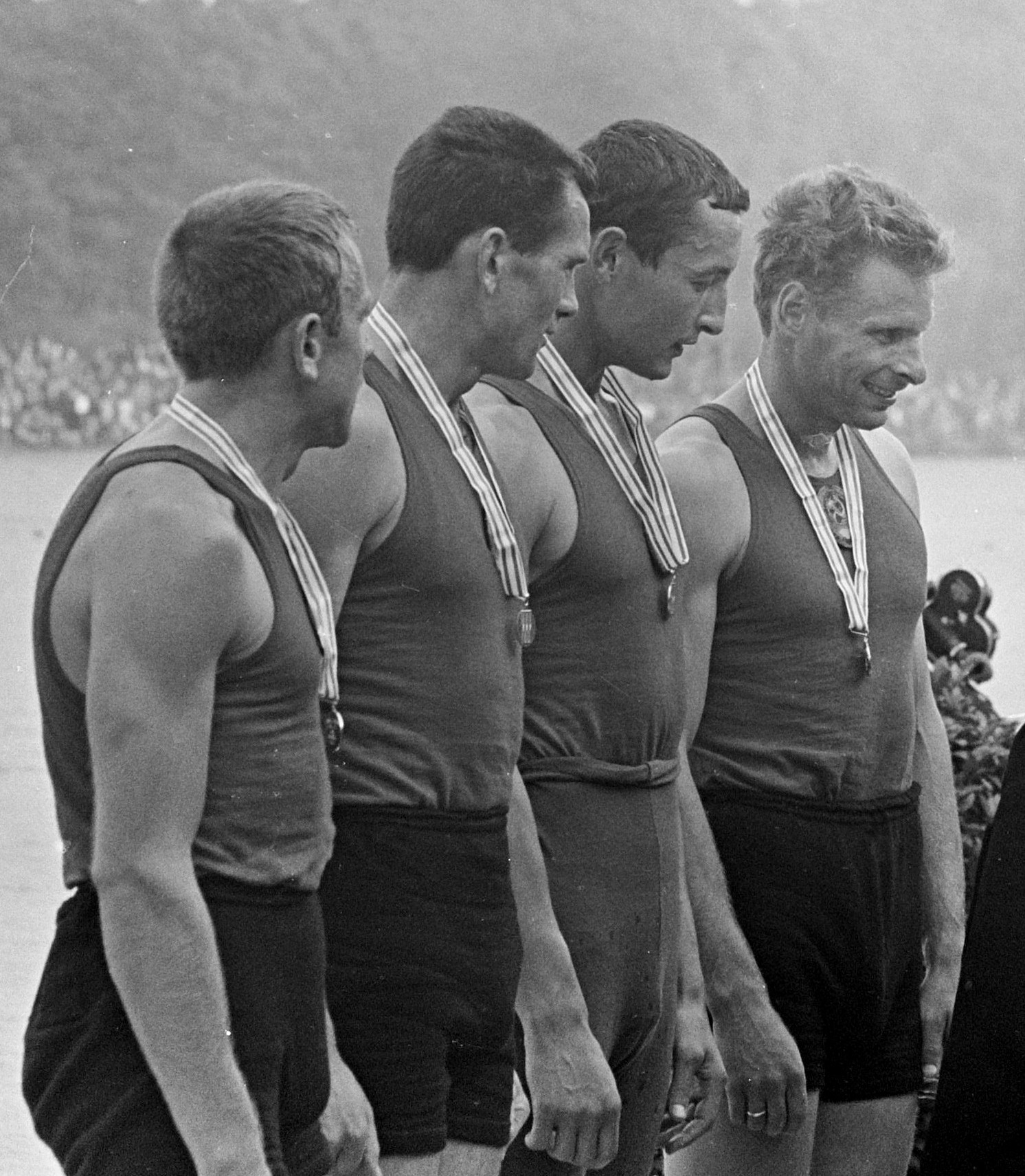
- Zigmas Jukna, Antanas Bagdonavicius, Volodymyr Sterlik and Juozas Jagelavicius at the 1965 European Championships

Personal information
- Born: 13 July 1935 Palūksčiai, Lithuania
- Died: 7 October 1980 (aged 45) Vilnius, Lithuanian SSR, Soviet Union
- Education: Vilnius Pedagogical Institute
- Height: 1.84 m (6 ft 0 in)
- Weight: 86 kg (190 lb)

Sport
- Sport: Rowing
- Club: Žalgiris Vilnius
Medal record
Representing the Soviet Union
Olympic Games
Silver medal – second place	1960 Rome	Coxed pair
Bronze medal – third place	1968 Mexico City	Eight
World Rowing Championships
Silver medal – second place	1962 Lucerne	Eight
Silver medal – second place	1966 Bled	Coxless four
European Rowing Championships
Gold medal – first place	1961 Prague	Coxed pair
Gold medal – first place	1965 Duisburg	Coxless four
Gold medal – first place	1967 Vichy	Coxed four
Silver medal – second place	1963 Copenhagen	Eight
Silver medal – second place	1964 Amsterdam	Eight
Silver medal – second place	1969 Klagenfurt	Eight

Zigmas Pranciškus Jukna (13 July 1935 – 7 October 1980) was a Lithuanian rower. He competed for the Soviet Union at the 1960, 1964 and 1968 Summer Olympics, and finished in second, fifth and third place in the coxed pairs, eights and eights events, respectively. Between 1961 and 1969 he won three gold and five silver medals at European and world championships. Starting from 1971 he worked as a judge with the International Rowing Federation.

In 1962, Jukna graduated from the Lithuanian University of Educational Sciences. He was married to Irena Jukna, also a competitive rower; they had a son. In the late 1970s Jukna was diagnosed with a brain tumor and died in 1980 after two operations.
