= Edgar Morales (rower) =

Mexican rower (born 1949)

Personal information
- Born: 8 August 1949 (age 77) Mexico City, Mexico

Sport
- Sport: Rowing

Edgar Morales (born 8 August 1949) is a Mexican rower. He competed in the men's eight event at the 1968 Summer Olympics.
