= Michael Morgan (rower) =

Australian rower

Michael Morgan OAM
- Born: 19 December 1946 (age 79); Sydney
- Education: Newington College
- Occupations: Physical education teacher Rowing Coach
- Spouse: Meg
- Children: 2 daughters

Olympic medal record

Men's rowing
Silver medal – second place	1968 Mexico City	Eight

Michael Dennis Morgan OAM (born 19 December 1946) is an Australian former national champion and Olympic medal winning rower. He was an Olympic level national coach and a highly successful schoolboy coach over his twenty-five coaching career.

== Rowing career ==
Morgan attended Newington College (1957–1965) where he took up rowing. His senior rowing was done at the Sydney Rowing Club from 1964.

He won state championships in Sydney boats and titles for New South Wales. He rowed in the New South Wales King's Cup VIII for six consecutive years at the Australian Rowing Championships from 1968 to 1973, winning the national title in 1968 and 1972.

He represented Australia at successive Olympics – winning silver at 1968 Mexico City 1968 in the men's VIII and then competing at Munich 1972

== Coaching career ==
Morgan was appointed the first professional head coach of the Sydney Rowing Club and went on to set a record for the most national championships as a coach in a single year.

He coached New South Wales representative youth and King's Cup crews throughout the 1970s and 80s and went to a third Olympics as coach of the Australian VIII for the Montreal 1976.

He is also a high school coach. He coached the 1st VIII at Newington College, in partnership with Robert Buntine, for twenty-six years and in ten of those the school's crew won the Head of the River. For twenty of those years he was a teacher at the College.
