= David Douglas (rower) =

Australian rower

Personal information
- Born: 16 March 1947 (age 79) Melbourne, Victoria, Australia

Sport
- Sport: Rowing
- Club: Mercantile Rowing Club
Medal record
Men's rowing
Representing Australia
Men's rowing
Silver medal – second place	1968 Mexico City	Men's eight

David G. A. Douglas (born 16 March 1947) is an Australian former rower. He was a five-time Australian national champion, won a gold medal at the inaugural North American rowing championships in 1967 and won a silver medal at the 1968 Summer Olympics.

== Club and state rowing ==
Douglas was born in Melbourne, Victoria, and was educated at Scotch College where he was introduced to rowing. He rowed in the school's 2nd VIII in 1965 and the senior VIII in 1966. His senior rowing was from the Mercantile Rowing Club where he had a long association.

He first made state selection for Victoria in the 1967 men's eight which contested the King's Cup at the annual Interstate Regatta. He then rowed in further Victorian eights at the Interstate Regattas in 1968, 1969, 1970 and 1971. Those crews won the King's Cup on three consecutive occasions from 1969 to 1971. After a long break he made a comeback to elite rowing in 1980 and that year rowed in the two seat of another winning Victorian King's Cup eight.

At the 1968 Australian Rowing Championships in a composite Mercantile/MUBC crew Douglas, Graeme Boykett, John Harry, Stephen Gillon, and cox Tom Daffy won the Australian coxed four title.

== International representative rowing ==
In 1967 all-Victorian coxed four of Douglas, Boykett, Harry, Gillon, and Daffy was selected as Australian representatives to race at the US championships, the inaugural North American championships and the European Championships. They fared well placing second in the US and winning the North American championship in St Catharines.

In 1968 Douglas was the sole Victorian added to the New South Wales crew which made up the Australian men's eight for the Mexico Olympics. He was seated at three for their Olympic campaign and silver medal victory in Mexico City.

For the 1970 World Rowing Championships in St Catharines, Douglas was in the six seat of the Australian eight which rowed to a fifth placing in the final.

== Accolades and family ==
After competitive retirement Douglas was Chairman of selectors at Mercantile Rowing Club for a number of years. In 2010 he was inducted as a member of the Rowing Victoria Hall of Fame.

His daughter Gina Douglas is also an Australian national representative rower. She competed at six world championships and at the Atlanta 1996 in the women's eight and at Sydney 2000 as a single sculler. David's son Robert Douglas rowed in the Australian men's eight at the 2001 and the 2002 World Rowing Championships.
