= Vladimír Jánoš =

Czech rower

Personal information
- Born: 23 November 1945 (age 80) Prague, Czechoslovakia
- Height: 192 cm (6 ft 4 in)
- Weight: 89 kg (196 lb)

Sport
- Sport: Rowing
Medal record
Men's rowing
Representing Czechoslovakia
Olympic Games
Bronze medal – third place	1972 Munich	Coxed four
European Rowing Championships
Bronze medal – third place	1973 Moscow	Coxed four

Vladimír Jánoš (born 23 November 1945) is a Czech rower who competed for Czechoslovakia in the 1968 Summer Olympics, in the 1972 Summer Olympics, and in the 1976 Summer Olympics.

He was born in Prague. In 1968 he was a crew member of the Czechoslovak boat which finished fifth in the eight event. Four years later he won the bronze medal with the Czechoslovak boat in the coxed four competition. At the 1976 Games he was part of the Czechoslovak boat that finished fourth in the coxed four contest.
