= Lutz Ulbricht =

German rower

Personal information
- Born: 9 November 1942 Berlin, Germany
- Died: 23 December 2022 (aged 80)

Sport
- Sport: Rowing
Medal record
Men's rowing
Representing West Germany
Olympic Games
Gold medal – first place	1968 Mexico City	Eight
World Rowing Championships
Gold medal – first place	1966 Bled	Eight
Bronze medal – third place	1970 St. Catharines	Coxless pair
European Rowing Championships
Silver medal – second place	1965 Duisburg	Coxless four

Lutz Ulbricht (9 November 1942 – 23 December 2022) was a competition rower and Olympic champion for West Germany. He was born in Berlin. Ulbricht won a gold medal in men's eight at the 1968 Summer Olympics in Mexico City, as a member of the rowing team from West Germany.
