= Volodymyr Sterlik =

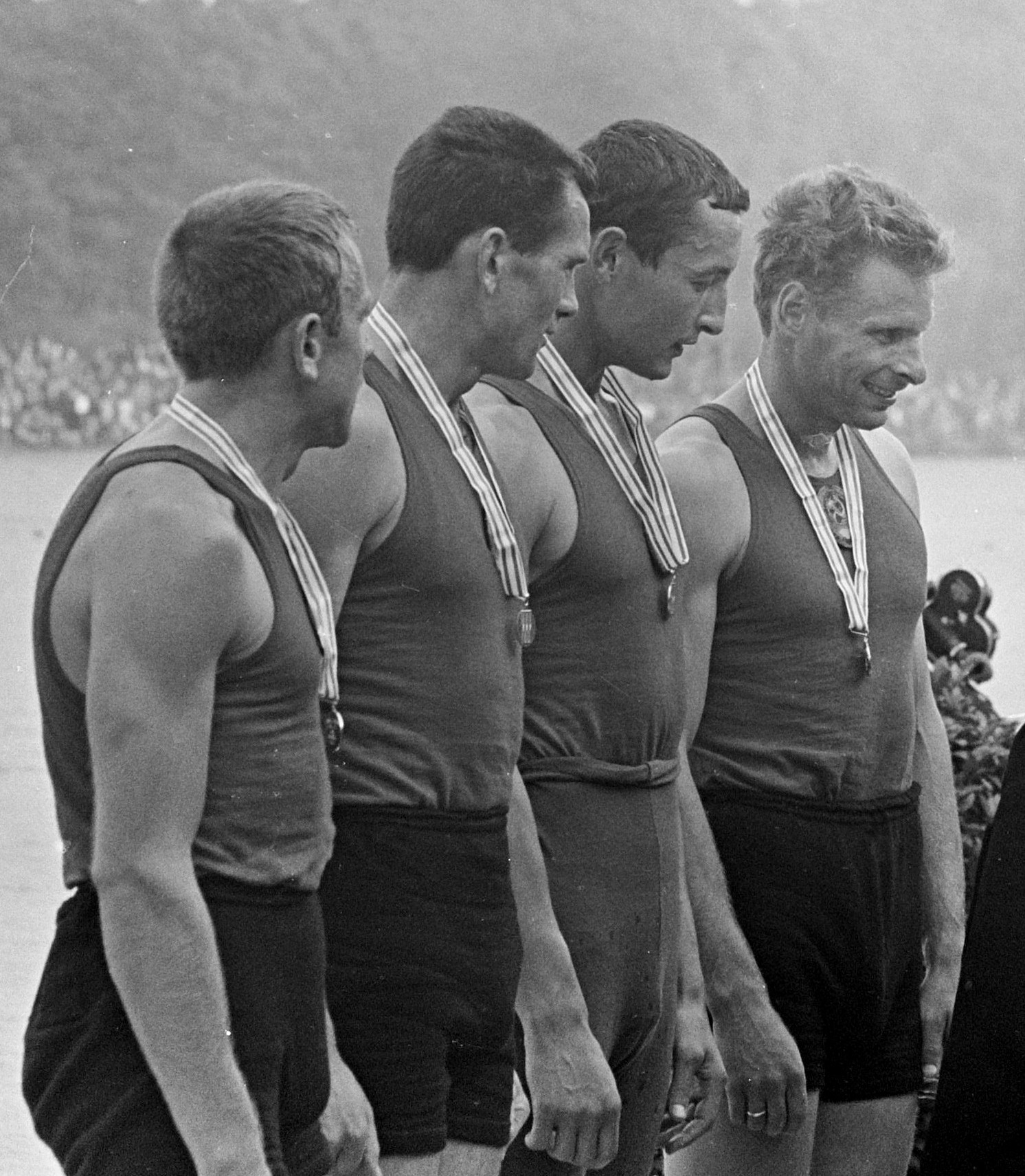
- Zigmas Jukna, Antanas Bagdonavicius, Volodymyr Sterlik and Juozas Jagelavicius – winners of the 1965 European Championships in the coxless fours

Personal information
- Born: 15 October 1940 (age 85) Poltava, Ukrainian SSR, Soviet Union
- Height: 1.93 m (6 ft 4 in)
- Weight: 97 kg (214 lb)

Sport
- Sport: Rowing
- Club: Avangard Kyiv
Medal record
Olympic Games
| Bronze medal – third place | 1968 Mexico City | Eight |
World Rowing Championships
| Silver medal – second place | 1966 Bled | Coxless four |
European Rowing Championships
| Gold medal – first place | 1965 Duisburg | Coxless four |
| Gold medal – first place | 1967 Vichy | Coxed four |
| Silver medal – second place | 1963 Copenhagen | Eight |
| Silver medal – second place | 1964 Amsterdam | Eight |
| Silver medal – second place | 1969 Klagenfurt | Eight |
| Bronze medal – third place | 1971 Copenhagen | Coxed four |

Volodymyr Ivanovych Sterlyk (Ukrainian: Володимир Иванович Стерлик, born 15 October 1940) is a retired Ukrainian rower. He competed for the Soviet Union at the 1964, 1968 and 1972 Summer Olympics and finished in fifth, third and fourth place in the eights, eights and coxed fours events, respectively. Between 1963 and 1971 he won two gold, four silver and one bronze medals at European and world championships.
