= Daryl MacDonald =

Canadian rower (1934–2016)

Personal information
- Born: 20 November 1934; St. Catharines, Ontario, Canada
- Died: 2 December 2016 (aged 82)

Sport
- Sport: Rowing

Daryl Raymond MacDonald (20 November 1934 – 2 December 2016) was a Canadian rower. He competed at the 1964 Summer Olympics and the 1968 Summer Olympics. MacDonald died on 2 December 2016, at the age of 82.
