= Vytautas Briedis =

Lithuanian rower (1940–2019)

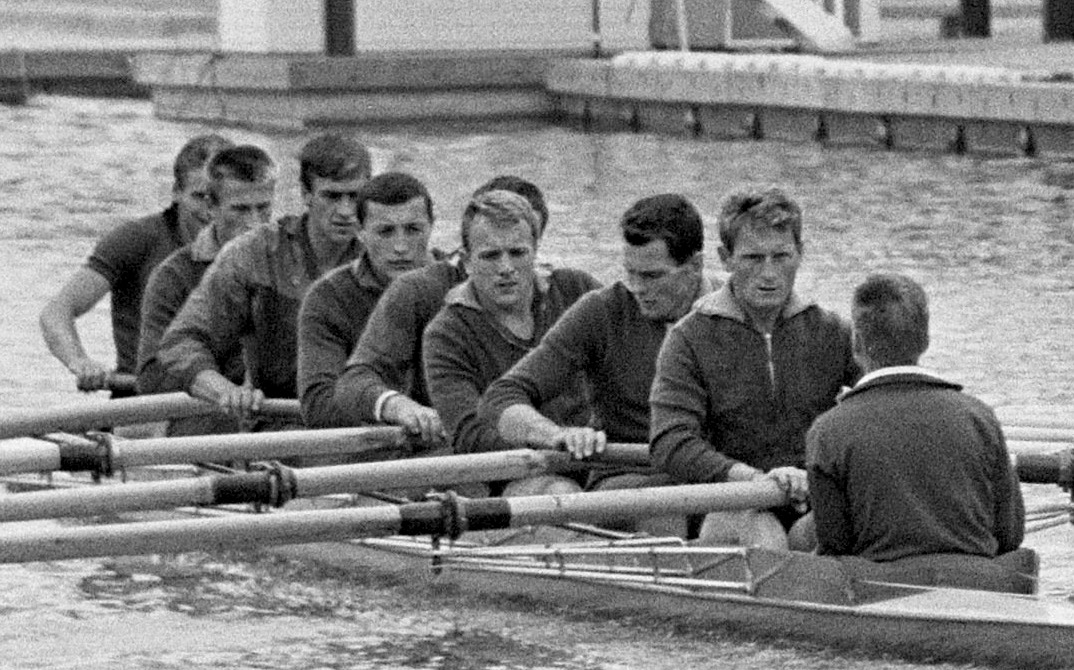
- Soviet eight at the 1964 European Championships, Briedis is third from left

Personal information
- Born: 27 August 1940 Nausėdžiai, Lithuanian SSR, Soviet Union
- Died: 22 September 2019 (aged 79) Vilnius, Lithuania
- Education: Kaunas Polytechnic Institute
- Height: 1.89 m (6 ft 2 in)
- Weight: 88 kg (194 lb)

Sport
- Sport: Rowing
- Club: Žalgiris Vilnius
Medal record
Representing the Soviet Union
Olympic Games
Bronze medal – third place	1968 Mexico City	Eight
World Rowing Championships
Silver medal – second place	1962 Lucerne	Eight
European Rowing Championships
Silver medal – second place	1963 Copenhagen	Eight
Silver medal – second place	1964 Amsterdam	Eight

Julius Vytautas Briedis (27 August 1940 – 22 September 2019) was a Lithuanian rower who specialized in the eight. In this boat class he won three silver medals at the European and world championships of 1962–1964 and finished fifth and third at the 1964 and 1968 Summer Olympics, respectively.

Briedis started rowing in 1955. Between 1959 and 1962 he worked as electrician and welder. In 1968 he graduated from the Vilnius branch of the Kaunas Polytechnic Institute and between 1969 and 1976 worked as an engineer. After that he coached rowing, first at Dynamo Vilnius and then at the national level. Since 1990 he acted as a sports functionary.

Briedis died on 22 September 2019 in Vilnius.
