= Niko Ott =

German rower

Medal record

Men's rowing

Olympic Games

Representing West Germany
Gold medal – first place	1968 Mexico City	Eight

Nikolaus Ott (born 9 July 1945) is a competition rower and Olympic champion for West Germany.

Ott won a gold medal in coxed eights at the 1968 Summer Olympics in Mexico City, as a member of the rowing team from West Germany.
