= Clayton Brown =

Canadian rower

Personal information
- Born: 16 September 1940 (age 84); St. Catharines, Ontario, Canada

Sport
- Sport: Rowing

Clayton Brown (born 16 September 1940) is a Canadian rower. He competed at the 1960 Summer Olympics and the 1968 Summer Olympics.
