= Richard Symsyk =

Canadian rower

Personal information
- Born: 25 April 1944; Summerside, Prince Edward Island, Canada
- Died: December 2004 (aged 59–60); St. Catharines, Ontario, Canada

Sport
- Sport: Rowing

Richard Symsyk (25 April 1944 – December 2004) was a Canadian rower. He competed at the 1968 Summer Olympics and the 1972 Summer Olympics.
