= Bob Shirlaw =

Australian rower

Olympic medal record

Men's rowing
Silver medal – second place	1968 Mexico City	Men's eight

Robert Alan Shirlaw OAM (born 9 April 1943) is an Australian former rower and stalwart school level rowing coach. He rowed at the 1964 Summer Olympics and the 1968 Summer Olympics.

== Club and state rowing ==
He was born in Sydney and his senior rowing was with the Mosman Rowing Club.

In 1963 and 1964 he was the New South Wales selected sculler to contest the President's Cup - the interstate single sculls championship - at the Australian Interstate Regatta. He placed third on both occasions. Then in 1967 he won the President's Cup and the interstate single sculls championship.1967 Interstate Regatta

In 1964 and 1966 he won the national coxless pair title at the Australian Rowing Championships - both times paired with Roger Ninham. In 1966 he also contested the coxless four title in a composite Haberfield/Mosman crew.

== International representative rowing ==
In 1964 as the Australian champion coxless pair, Shirlaw and Roger Ninham were selected as Australia's coxless pair to compete at the 1964 Tokyo Olympics in the coxless pair. They finished third in the B final for an overall ninth place.

Four years later he won the silver medal in the bow seat of the Australian eight at the Mexico Olympics. Shirlaw had been a reserve for the 1968 victorious New South Wales King's Cup crew who were selected in toto as the Australian eight to represent at the Mexico Olympics. Phil Cayzer recruited several of the rowers from Mosman including Shirlaw, to Sydney Rowing Club to create the New South Wales crew in the first place and then coached them as the Australian eight both at home and in Mexico. Final selections for the eight saw David Douglas and Shirlaw selected in place of John Nickson and Mosman's John Clarke who became reserves. In the final in Mexico the Australian eight raced superbly. They kept a low profile in the first 1200m Australians, and then moved up to the leading crews 100 metres from the line. In the final sprint the Germans in a boat some 34 kg lighter than any other in the race, held on by less than a second in front of the Australians.

== Coaching career ==
From 1979 Shirlaw was rowing coach at Shore, the Sydney Church of England Grammar School for 34 years. In 2013 he moved to St Joseph's College, Hunters Hill and assisted that school in 2015 win its first AAGPS Head of the River win in 42 years. He moved to The Scots College in 2017 as Director of Rowing.

Shirlaw received a Medal of the Order of Australia (OAM) in the 2008 Australia Day Honours for "service to rowing as a coach, administrator and competitor, and to education".
