= Alan Grover =

Australian rowing coxswain (1944–2019)

Personal information
- Full name: Alan Geoffrey Grover
- Born: 24 September 1944 Sydney, Australia
- Died: 12 May 2019 (aged 74)

Sport
- Club: Sydney Rowing Club

Achievements and titles
- Olympic finals: 1968 Mexico City
- National finals: Penrith Cup 1962,65,67; King's Cup 1968-72, 1980
Medal record
Men's rowing
Representing Australia
Olympic Games
| Silver medal – second place | 1968 Mexico City | Men's eight |

Alan Geoffrey Grover (24 September 1944 – 12 May 2019) was an Australian representative rowing coxswain. He was a six-time national champion and triple Olympian who steered Australian crews at the 1964, 1968 and 1972 Summer Olympics. Grover coxed at the elite level in Australia over an eighteen-year period from 1962 to 1980.

== Club and state rowing ==
He was born in Sydney and attended Sydney Boys High. His senior rowing was from the Sydney Rowing Club.

He first made state selection for New South Wales in 1962 in the men's lightweight four which contested the Penrith Cup at the Interstate Regatta. In 1965 and 1967 he was again in the stern of New South Wales Penrith Cup fours and he steered those crews to victory. In 1968 he coxed the New South Wales state eight to victory in the King's Cup at the Interstate Regatta. He cemented his place in the stern of the New South Wales men's eight and steered those crews in the King's Cups of 1969, 1970, 1971 and 1972. The 1972 crew was again victorious. After a long break he made a return to senior rowing in 1980 and that year again steered the New South Wales King's Cup eight.

He coxed Sydney Rowing Club crews in national title attempts at the Australian Rowing Championships on various occasions - coxed fours in 1964 and 1980 (both champions); coxed pairs in 1966 (fourth place) and 1980 (champions).

== International representative rowing ==
In 1964 Grover was selected as coxswain of an Australian four which finished tenth in the coxed four event at the Tokyo Olympics. Four years later he steered the Australian men's eight to a silver medal at the 1968 Mexico City Olympics. At the 1972 Munich Olympics he was again in the stern of the Australian crew which finished in eighth place in the men's eight event.

== Professional career ==
In business life Grover was a senior marketing employee at Speedo from 1987 to 2012. He then joined the Australian Olympic Committee, again employed as a marketing professional.
