= Erik Wesdorp =

Dutch rower

Personal information
- Born: 15 February 1947 Amsterdam, the Netherlands
- Died: 17 October 2017 (aged 70)
- Height: 1.87 m (6 ft 2 in)
- Weight: 82 kg (181 lb)

Sport
- Sport: Rowing
- Club: Nereus, Amsterdam

Izak Cornelis Eric Wesdorp (15 February 1947 – 17 October 2017) was a Dutch rower. He competed at the 1968 Summer Olympics in the eight event and finished in eights place. After retiring from competitions he worked as a rowing coach, particularly with Chun Wei Cheung.
