= Jan Wallisch =

Czech rower

Personal information
- Nationality: Czech
- Born: 16 January 1948 (age 77); Třeboň, Czechoslovakia

Sport
- Sport: Rowing

Jan Wallisch (born 16 January 1948) is a Czech rower. He competed in the men's eight event at the 1968 Summer Olympics.
