= Milan Hurtala =

Slovak rower (1946–2021)

Personal information
- Nationality: Slovak
- Born: 16 June 1946; Bratislava, Czechoslovakia
- Died: 20 March 2021 (aged 74); Bratislava, Slovakia

Sport
- Sport: Rowing

Milan Hurtala (16 June 1946 – 20 March 2021) was a Slovak rower. He competed in the men's eight event at the 1968 Summer Olympics. Hurtala died of COVID-19 during the pandemic in Slovakia.
