= Jan Kůrka =

Czech sport shooter

Personal information
- Born: 29 May 1943 (age 83) Pelhřimov, Protectorate of Bohemia and Moravia

Sport
- Sport: Sport shooting
Medal record
Men's shooting
Representing Czechoslovakia
Olympic Games
| Gold medal – first place | 1968 Mexico City | 50 metre rifle prone |

Jan Kůrka (born 29 May 1943) is a Czech sport shooter who competed for Czechoslovakia. He won a gold medal in the 50 metre rifle prone event at the 1968 Summer Olympics in Mexico City.
