= John Ranch =

Australian rower (1940–2022)

Personal information
- Born: 16 November 1940
- Died: 15 September 2022 (aged 81)

Sport
- Sport: Rowing
- Club: SUBC
Medal record
Men's rowing
Representing Australia
Men's rowing
Silver medal – second place	1968 Mexico City	Men's eight

John Raymond "JR" Ranch (16 November 1940 – 2022) was an Australian rower, twice a national champion and a silver medal winner at the 1968 Summer Olympics.

== Early life ==
Ranch was born in Bondi, New South Wales and moved to Orange, New South Wales at four years of age when his father became the licensee of the Tourist Hotel there. He was schooled at the Santa Maria Convent school and then at De La Salle College, Orange. He attended Sydney University from 1959, and joined the Sydney University Boat Club as well as rowing in surf boats at the Bondi Surf Club.

== Rowing career ==
From the Sydney University Boat Club Ranch was chosen to represent Australia in a Trans-Tasman regatta against New Zealand in 1965 rowing in the four seat of the men's eight. That crew placed second in both of its match races. In 1966 Ranch was seated at bow in the Australian men's coxed four which competed at the second ever World Rowing Championships in Bled, Yugoslavia and placed eighth. In 1968 he was seated at three in the Australian men's eight which won the silver medal at the Mexico Olympics.

Ranch rowed in New South Wales representative state eights contesting the King's Cup at the Australian Interstate Regatta on three occasions in 1966, 1968, 1969 and won King's Cup in 1968. At the 1966 Australian Rowing Championships in a composite SRC/SUBC crew Ranch, Chris Stevens, Alf Duval, Peter Dickson, and cox Brian Thomas won the Australian coxed four title.

On retirement, he coached at Sydney University and the Sydney Rowing Club. In 1985 again as a rower, Ranch represented Australia at the World Masters Games in Toronto, Canada.
