= Viktor Suslin (rower) =

Personal information
- Born: 19 July 1944 (age 81) Leningrad, Russian SFSR, Soviet Union
- Height: 1.90 m (6 ft 3 in)
- Weight: 99 kg (218 lb)

Sport
- Sport: Rowing
Medal record
Men's rowing
Representing the Soviet Union
Olympic Games
Bronze medal – third place	1968 Mexico City	Eight
World Rowing Championships
Silver medal – second place	1966 Bled	Eight
Bronze medal – third place	1966 Bled	Coxless pair
European Rowing Championships
Bronze medal – third place	1967 Vichy	Eight
Bronze medal – third place	1971 Copenhagen	Coxed four

Viktor Nikolaevich Suslin (Russian: Виктор Николаевич Суслин; born 19 July 1944) is a retired Russian rower who specialized in the eights. In this event he won bronze medals at the 1968 Summer Olympics and 1967 European Championships and a silver at the 1966 World Rowing Championships. His elder brother Yury is also a retired Olympic rower.
