= Jan Steinhauser =

Dutch rower (1944–2022)

Personal information
- Born: 20 September 1944 Nijmegen, Netherlands
- Died: 28 November 2022 (aged 78) Amsterdam, Netherlands
- Height: 1.84 m (6 ft 0 in)
- Weight: 83 kg (183 lb)

Sport
- Sport: Rowing
- Club: Nereus, Amsterdam

Jan Rudolf Steinhauser (20 September 1944 – 28 November 2022) was a Dutch rower. He competed at the 1968 Summer Olympics in the eight event and finished in eighth place.

Steinhauser died in Amsterdam on 28 November 2022, at the age of 78.
