= Joe Fazio =

Australian rower

Personal information
- Born: 11 September 1942
- Died: August 2011 (aged 68)
- Education: St. Joseph's College, Hunters Hill

Sport
- Sport: Rowing
- Club: Sydney Rowing Club
Medal record
Men's rowing
Representing Australia
Olympic Games
Silver medal – second place	1968 Mexico City	Men's eight

Joseph "Joe" Ray Fazio (11 September 1942 – August 2011) was an Australian national champion rower who won a silver medal at the 1968 Summer Olympics.

== Early life and schooling ==
He was born in Taree, New South Wales and was sent to school in Sydney in 1955 at St. Joseph's College, Hunters Hill following the death of his father when Joe was nine years of age. In his senior year in 1960 he stroked the College's first VIII, was elected Captain of Boats, played in the Championship winning 1st XV and was selected in the combined GPS 2nd XV. At the College's Cadet Camp in 1959 he was involved in a tragic accident when his close friend Michael Farrell was critically injured by an unexploded shell which he and Fazio found on the Singleton rifle range. The explosion left pieces of shrapnel in Fazio's body and some shrapnel was too close to the spine to be removed.

== Career ==
Following school Fazio started a career with the Royal Australian Navy Experimental Laboratories as a research assistant. He played club rugby with Sydney's Eastern Suburbs RUFC and was persuaded by team mate Jake Howard to take up rowing at the senior level with the Sydney Rowing Club. He had success at the Sydney club, stroking a junior eight to a New South Wales state championship in 1964–65, a coxless four to a state championship victory in 1966 and stroking the club's senior eight from 1966.

Back pain caused by the shrapnel still lodged close to his spine forced Fazio to undergo a spinal fusion operation in 1967 but within six months he was again rowing at the highest level. He was selected in the New South Wales state eight which won the King's Cup at the Interstate Regatta within the Australian Rowing Championships in 1968 and from there he was selected in six seat of the Australian boat which won the silver medal in the eights event at the 1968 Mexico Olympics. He made another state representative appearance for New South Wales in the King's Cup crew at the 1969 Interstate Championships.

Later in life he returned to St Joseph's as a voluntary coach and was involved with fours and the school's 1st eight between 1993 and 1997.

In business he worked in senior management positions for Qantas and the Hilton Hotel Group. He died in 2011 following the effects of Alzheimer's disease.

== Footnotes ==
- Fazio Olympic profile
