= Pavel Kupka =

Czech modern pentathlete

Personal information
- Born: 21 April 1946 Prague, Czechoslovakia
- Died: September 2024 (aged 78)

Sport
- Sport: Modern pentathlon

Pavel Kupka (21 April 1946 – September 2024) was a Czech modern pentathlete. He competed for Czechoslovakia at the 1968 Summer Olympics.

Pavel Kupka died in September 2024.
