= Aleksandr Martyshkin =

Russian rower (1943–2021)

Personal information
- Born: 26 August 1943 Moscow, Russian SFSR, Soviet Union
- Died: 29 October 2021 (aged 78)
Medal record
Men's rowing
Representing the Soviet Union
Olympic Games
Bronze medal – third place	1968 Mexico City	Eight
World Rowing Championships
Silver medal – second place	1966 Bled	Eight
Silver medal – second place	1970 St. Catharines	Eight
European Rowing Championships
Silver medal – second place	1965 Duisburg	Eight
Bronze medal – third place	1967 Vichy	Eight
Bronze medal – third place	1971 Copenhagen	Eight
Bronze medal – third place	1973 Moscow	Eight

Aleksandr Georgievich Martyshkin (Russian: Александр Георгиевич Мартышкин, 26 August 1943 – 29 October 2021) was a Russian rower who competed for the Soviet Union in the 1968 Summer Olympics and in the 1972 Summer Olympics.

He was born in Moscow.

In 1968 he was a crew member of the Soviet boat which won the bronze medal in the eight event.

Four years later he finished fourth with the Soviet boat in the eight competition.
