= Valentyn Kravchuk =

Soviet rower

Personal information
- Born: Valentyn Ivanovych Kravchuk; 12 April 1944 Zhytomyr, Ukrainian SSR, Soviet Union
- Died: 12 January 2003 (aged 58) Kyiv, Ukraine

Sport
- Sport: Rowing
Medal record
Men's rowing
Representing the Soviet Union
Olympic Games
Bronze medal – third place	1968 Mexico City	Eight

Valentyn Ivanovych Kravchuk (Ukrainian: Валентин Иванович Кравчук, 12 April 1944 – 12 January 2003) was a Ukrainian rower who competed for the Soviet Union in the 1968 Summer Olympics.

He was born in Zhytomyr.

In 1968 he won the bronze medal with the Soviet boat in the eights event.
