= Andy Larkin (rower) =

American rower (1946–2023)

Personal information
- Nationality: American
- Born: September 20, 1946; New Britain, Connecticut, U.S.
- Died: August 11, 2023 (aged 76)

Sport
- Sport: Rowing

Andy Larkin (September 20, 1946 – August 11, 2023) was an American rower. He competed in the men's eight event at the 1968 Summer Olympics. He graduated from Harvard University and Harvard Medical School. Larkin died on August 11, 2023, at the age of 76.
