= Antonín Procházka (volleyball) =

Czech volleyball player (born 1942)

Personal information
- Nickname: Antonín Procházka
- Nationality: Czech
- Born: April 3, 1942 (age 84); Brno, Protectorate of Bohemia and Moravia
- Height: 184 cm (6 ft 0 in)
Honours
Men's volleyball
Representing Czechoslovakia
Olympic Games
Bronze medal – third place	1968 Mexico City	Team

Antonín Procházka (born April 3, 1942) is a Czech former volleyball player who competed for Czechoslovakia in the 1968 Summer Olympics.

He was born in Brno.

In 1968, he was part of the Czechoslovak team that won the bronze medal in the Olympic tournament. He played eight matches.
