= Eric Niehe =

Dutch rower

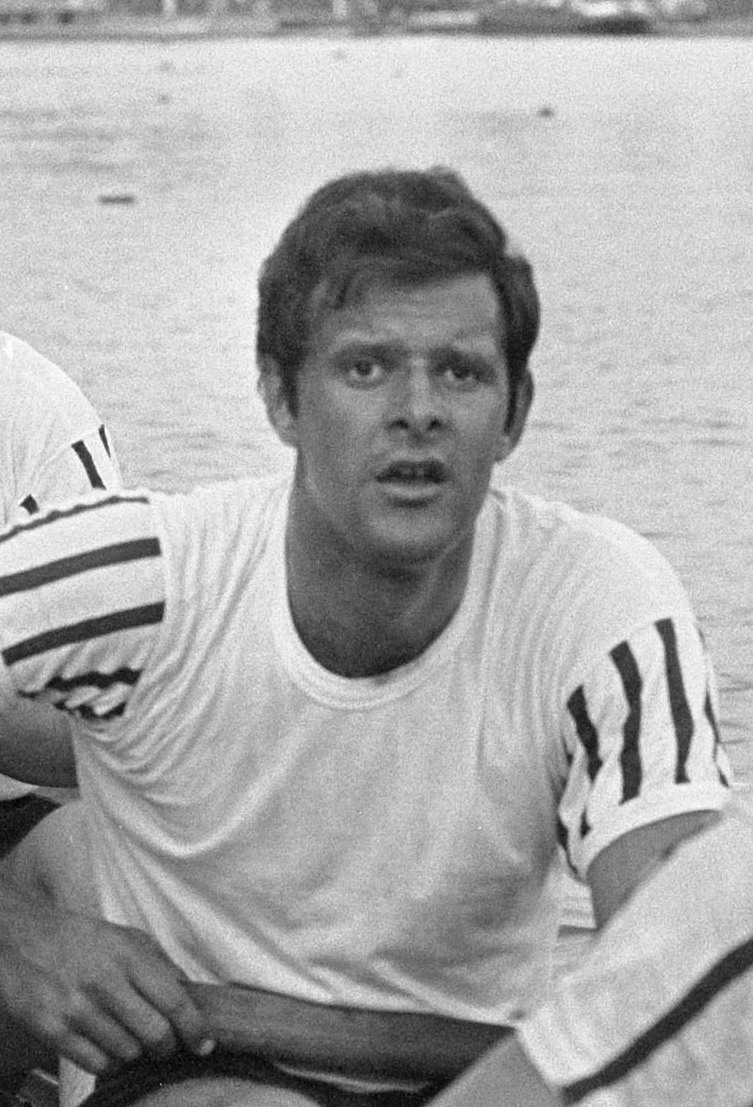
- Eric Niehe in 1967

Personal information
- Born: 4 November 1943 (age 82) Amsterdam, the Netherlands
- Height: 1.96 m (6 ft 5 in)
- Weight: 94 kg (207 lb)
- Relatives: Ivo Niehe (brother)

Sport
- Sport: Rowing
- Club: Nereus, Amsterdam
Medal record
Representing the Netherlands
World Rowing Championships
Bronze medal – third place	1966 Bled	Coxless four

Eric Fransiscus Charles Niehe (born 4 November 1943) is a retired Dutch rower who won a bronze medal in the coxless fours at the 1966 World Rowing Championships. He competed at the 1968 Summer Olympics in the eight event and finished in eights place.

His younger brother Ivo is a television presenter, producer and actor.
