= Zdeněk Kuba =

Czech rower

Personal information
- Nationality: Czech
- Born: 4 March 1948 (age 77); Břeclav, Czechoslovakia

Sport
- Sport: Rowing

Zdeněk Kuba (born 4 March 1948) is a Czech rower. He competed at the 1968 Summer Olympics and the 1972 Summer Olympics.
