= Arthur Koning =

Dutch rower

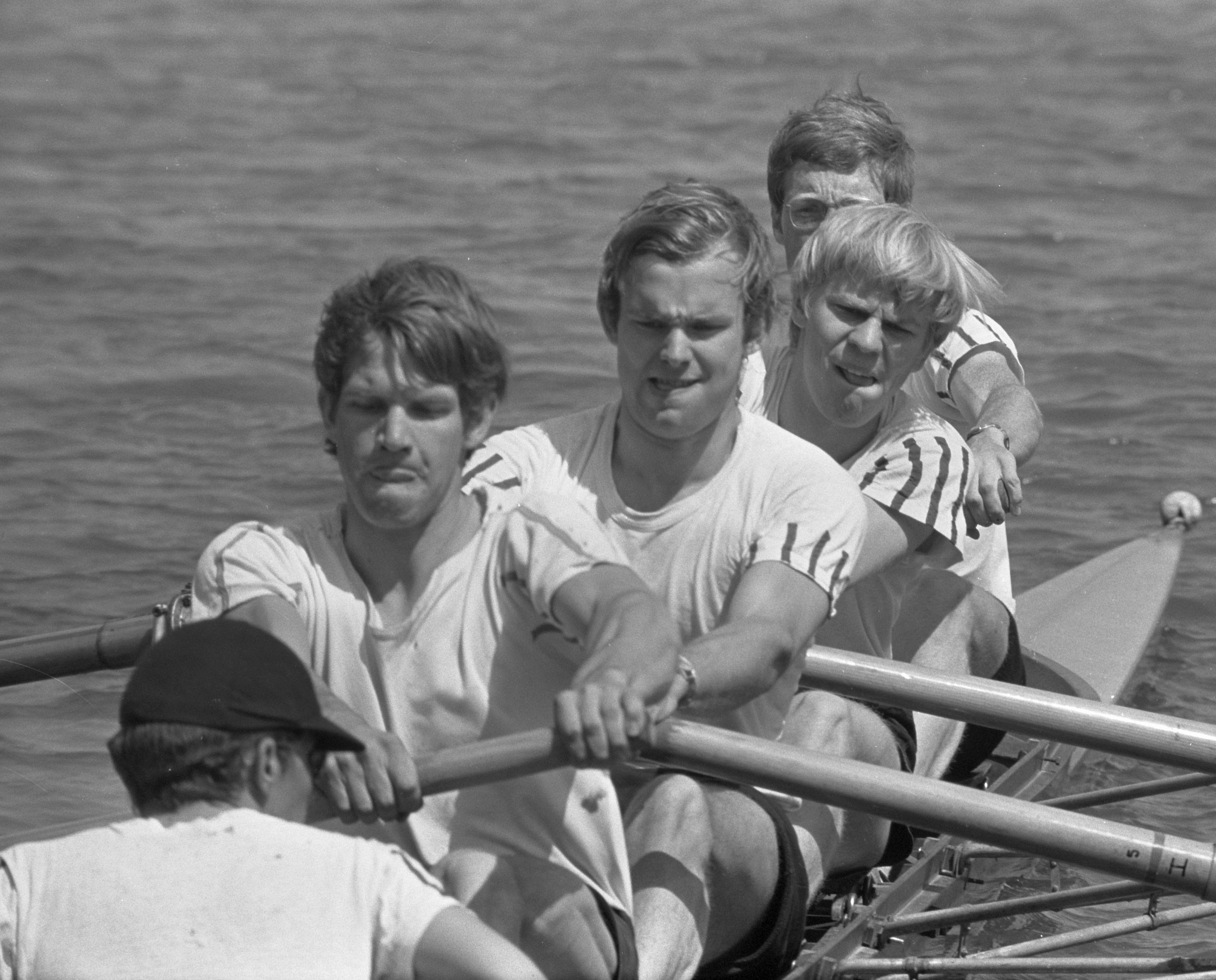
- Arthur Raoul Andrew Koning

Personal information
- Full name: Arthur Raoul Andrew Koning
- Born: 22 September 1944 Amsterdam, the Netherlands
- Died: 10 July 2015 (aged 70)
- Height: 1.65 m (5 ft 5 in)
- Weight: 53 kg (117 lb)

Sport
- Sport: Rowing
- Club: Nereus, Amsterdam

Arthur Raoul Andrew Koning (22 September 1944 – 10 July 2015) was a Dutch coxswain. He competed at the 1968 Summer Olympics in the eight event and finished in eighth place.
