= Ivan Miluška =

Czech rower

Personal information
- Nationality: Czech
- Born: 23 March 1946 (age 79); Brno, Czechoslovakia

Sport
- Sport: Rowing

Ivan Miluška (born 23 March 1946) is a Czech rower. He competed in the men's coxed pair event at the 1968 Summer Olympics.
