= Karel Kolesa =

Czech rower

Personal information
- Nationality: Czech
- Born: 31 December 1942 (age 82); Brno, Protectorate of Bohemia and Moravia

Sport
- Sport: Rowing

Karel Kolesa (born 31 December 1942) is a Czech rower. He competed in two events at the 1968 Summer Olympics.
