= 1966 World Rowing Championships =

International rowing event

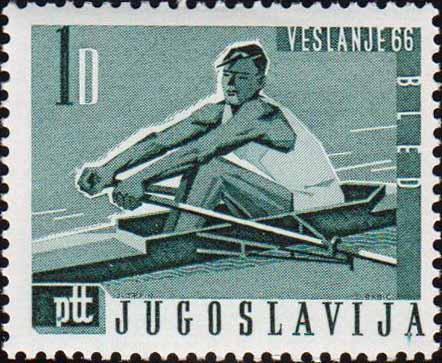
- Yugoslav stamp dedicated to the 1966 World Rowing Championships
- Venue: Lake Bled
- Location: Bled, Slovenia, Yugoslavia
- Dates: 8–11 September
- Competitors: 613 from 32 nations

The 1966 World Rowing Championships was the second time that world championships in rowing were held. The regatta was held from 8 to 11 September at Lake Bled in Bled, Slovenia, Yugoslavia. There were 613 rowers from 32 countries who competed in the seven Olympic boat classes. Marketing and advertising for the event were handled by Cesar Lüthi.

The Australian Rowing History website has the following commentary: "The superbly organized regatta was held on the magnificent lake at Bled: a fitting setting for the second world championships." Prior to the 4th World Rowing Championships in 1974, only men competed.

== Background ==
Bled and the German cities of Essen and Duisburg had competed for the right to host the second World Rowing Championships. At a FISA meeting in August 1963, held in conjunction with the 1963 European Rowing Championships for men, the decision in favour of Bled was made.

== Medal summary ==
Medalists at the 1966 World Rowing Championships:

=== Men's events ===
Event	Gold		Silver		Bronze	
Event	Country & rowers	Time	Country & rowers	Time	Country & rowers	Time
M1x	United States; Donald Spero	7:05.92	Netherlands; Jan Wienese	7:08.53	West Germany; Jochen Meißner	7:09.63
M2x	Switzerland; Melchior Bürgin; Martin Studach	6:34.89	United States; Seymour Cromwell; Jim Storm	6:36.23	East Germany; Manfred Haake; Jochen Brückhändler	6:38.92
M2-	East Germany; Peter Kremtz; Roland Göhler	6:53.96	Austria; Dieter Losert; Dieter Ebner	6:55.35	Soviet Union; Viktor Suslin; Boris Fyodorov	6:57.35
M2+	Netherlands; Hadriaan van Nes; Jan van de Graaff; Poul de Haan	7:12.23	France; Jacques Morel; Georges Morel; Gilles Florent	7:16.97	Italy; Primo Baran; Renzo Sambo; Enrico Pietropolli	7:17.04
M4-	East Germany; Frank Forberger; Frank Rühle; Dieter Grahn; Dieter Schubert	6:18.41	Soviet Union; Zigmas Jukna; Antanas Bagdonavičius; Volodymyr Sterlik; Juozas Jagelavičius	6:19.66	Netherlands; Maarten Kloosterman; Roel Luynenburg; Eric Niehe; Ruud Stokvis	6:20.33
M4+	East Germany; Hanno Melzer; Horst Bagdonat; Helmut Hänsel; Karl-Heinz Grzeschuchna; Klaus-Dieter Ludwig	6:29.54	Soviet Union; Anatoly Tkachuk; Vitaly Kurdchenko; Boris Kuzmin; Vladimir Yevseyev; Anatoliy Luzgin	6:31.38	Yugoslavia; Boris Ercegović; Predrag Savić; Ivo Juginović; Frane Kazija; Ljubo Čuravić	6:31.74
M8+	West Germany; Horst Meyer; Dirk Schreyer; Michael Schwan; Ulrich Luhn; Peter Hertel; Rüdiger Henning; Lutz Ulbricht; Peter Kuhn; Peter Niehusen	5:56.28	Soviet Union; Yuri Chodorov; Andris Prieditis; Aleksandr Martyshkin; Arkady Kudinov; Elmārs Rubīns; Vladimir Rikkanen; Viktor Suslin; Pavel Ilyinsky; Viktor Mikheyev	5:58.68	East Germany; Joachim Böhmer; Peter Schulz; Jörg Lucke; Kurt Wunderlich; Erich Wunderlich; Klaus-Dieter Bähr; Peter Hein; Heinz-Jürgen Bothe; Hartmut Wenzel	5:59.43

=== Event codes ===
	Single scull	Double scull	Coxless pair	Coxed pair	Coxless four	Coxed four	Eight
Men's	M1x	M2x	M2-	M2+	M4-	M4+	M8+

== Medal table ==
Place	Country	(gold) Gold	(silver) Silver	(bronze) Bronze	Total
1	East Germany	3	0	2	5
2	Netherlands	1	1	1	3
3	United States	1	1	0	2
4	West Germany	1	0	1	2
5	Switzerland	1	0	0	1
6	Soviet Union	0	3	1	4
7	Austria	0	1	0	1
7	France	0	1	0	1
9	Italy	0	0	1	1
9	Yugoslavia	0	0	1	1
Total		7	7	7	21

== Finals ==
Event	1st	2nd	3rd	4th	5th	6th
M1x	United States	Netherlands	West Germany	East Germany	Denmark	Soviet Union
M2x	Switzerland	United States	East Germany	Czechoslovakia	Romania	West Germany
M2-	East Germany	Austria	Soviet Union	Poland	West Germany	Italy
M2+	Netherlands	France	Italy	East Germany	United States	West Germany
M4-	East Germany	Soviet Union	Netherlands	Hungary	West Germany	Denmark
M4+	East Germany	Soviet Union	Yugoslavia	Czechoslovakia	Netherlands	United States
M8+	West Germany	Soviet Union	East Germany	Great Britain	Yugoslavia	New Zealand
