= Jan van Laarhoven =

Dutch rower

Personal information
- Born: 18 December 1945 (age 80) Zevenbergen, the Netherlands
- Height: 1.81 m (5 ft 11 in)
- Weight: 90 kg (200 lb)

Sport
- Sport: Rowing
- Club: Nereus, Amsterdam

Jan Thomas Johannes Adrianus van Laarhoven (born 18 December 1945) is a retired Dutch rower. He competed at the 1968 Summer Olympics in the eight event and finished in eighth place.
