= Great Britain at the 1976 Summer Olympics =

- Flag of the United Kingdom
- IOC code: GBR
- NOC: British Olympic Association

in Montreal
- Competitors: 242 (176 men and 66 women) in 17 sports
- Flag bearer: Rodney Pattisson
- Medals Ranked 13th: Gold 3 Silver 5 Bronze 5 Total 13

Summer Olympics appearances (overview)
- 1896; 1900; 1904; 1908; 1912; 1920; 1924; 1928; 1932; 1936; 1948; 1952; 1956; 1960; 1964; 1968; 1972; 1976; 1980; 1984; 1988; 1992; 1996; 2000; 2004; 2008; 2012; 2016; 2020; 2024

Other related appearances
- 1906 Intercalated Games

Great Britain, represented by the British Olympic Association (BOA), competed at the 1976 Summer Olympics in Montreal, Quebec, Canada. 242 competitors, 176 men and 66 women, took part in 148 events in 17 sports. British athletes have competed in every Summer Olympic Games.

== Medallists ==
Great Britain finished in 13th position in the final medal rankings, with 3 gold and 13 total medals.

Medals by sport
Sport	Gold medal	Silver medal	Bronze medal	Total
Swimming	1	1	1	3
Sailing	1	1	0	2
Modern pentathlon	1	0	0	1
Rowing	0	2	0	2
Judo	0	1	1	2
Athletics	0	0	1	1
Boxing	0	0	1	1
Cycling	0	0	1	1
Total	3	5	5	13

=== Gold ===
- John Osborn and Reg White — Sailing, Tornado
- Jim Fox, Danny Nightingale and Adrian Parker — Modern Pentathlon, Men's Team Competition
- David Wilkie — Swimming, Men's 200m Breaststroke

=== Silver ===
- Keith Remfry — Judo, Men's Open Class
- Michael Hart and Chris Baillieu — Rowing, Men's Double Sculls
- Jim Clark, Tim Crooks, Richard Lester, Hugh Matheson, David Maxwell, Lenny Robertson, John Yallop, Patrick Sweeney, and Frederick Smallbone — Rowing, Men's Eights
- David Wilkie — Swimming, Men's 100m Breaststroke
- Julian Brooke Houghton and Rodney Pattisson (Helmsman) — Sailing, Flying Dutchman

=== Bronze ===
- Brendan Foster — Athletics, Men's 10000 metres
- Patrick Cowdell — Boxing, Men's Bantamweight
- Ian Banbury, Michael Bennett, Robin Croker, and Ian Hallam — Cycling, Men's 4000m Team Pursuit
- David Starbrook — Judo, Men's Half-Heavyweight (93 kg)
- Alan McClatchey, David Dunne, Gordon Downie, Brian Brinkley — Swimming, Men's 4 × 200 m Freestyle Relay

== Archery ==
In the second appearance by Great Britain in modern Olympic archery, two men and two women represented the country. The best finishers in each division placed 21st.

Women's Individual Competition:

- Patricia Conway – 2257 points (→ 21st place)
- Rachael Fenwick – 2199 points (→ 23rd place)

Men's Individual Competition:

- David Pink – 2347 points (→ 21st place)
- Stewart Littlefair – 2238 points (→ 30th place)

== Athletics ==
Men's 200 metres

- Ainsley Bennett

- Heat— 21.26
- Quarter Final — 21.07
- Semi Final — 21.52 (→ did not advance)

Men's 400 metres

- David Jenkins

- Heat— 46.60
- Quarter Final — 46.18
- Semi Final — 45.20.
- Final — 45.57 (→ 7th place)

- Glen Cohen

- Heat— 47.77
- Quarter Final — 47.67 (did not advance)

Men's 800 metres

- Steve Ovett

- Heat — 1:48.27
- Semi Final — 1:46.14
- Final — 1:45.44 (→ 5th place)

- Frank Clement

- Heat — 1:47.51
- Semi Final — 1:48.28 (→ did not advance)

Men's 1500 metres

- Frank Clement

- Heat — 3:37:53
- Semi Final — 3.38.92
- Final — 3.39.65 (→ 5th place)

- Dave Moorcroft

- Heat — 3.40.69
- Semi Final — 3.39.88
- Final — 3.40.94 (→ 7th place)

- Steve Ovett

- Heat — 3.37.89
- Semi Final — 3.40.34 (→ did not advance)

Men's 10.000 metres

- Brendan Foster

- Heat — 28:22.19
- Final — 27:54.92 (→ Bronze Medal)

- Tony Simmons

- Heat — 28:01.82
- Final — 27:56.26 (→ 4th place)

- Bernie Ford

- Heat — 28:17.26
- Final — 28:17.78 (→ 8th place)

Men's 4 × 400 m Relay

- Ainsley Bennett, Glen Cohen, David Jenkins, and Alan Pascoe

- Heat — did not finish (→ did not advance)

Men's 400m Hurdles

- Alan Pascoe

- Heats — 51.66s
- Semi Final — 49.95s
- Final — 51.29s (→ 8th place)

Men's Long Jump

- Roy Mitchell

- Heat — 7.69m (→ did not advance)

Men's Marathon

- Jeffrey Norman — 2:20:04 (→ 26th place)
- Keith Angus — 2:22:18 (→ 31st place)
- Barry Watson — 2:28:32 (→ 45th place)

Men's 20 km Race Walk

- Brian Adams — 1:30:46 (→ 11th place)
- Olly Flynn — 1:31:42 (→ 14th place)
- Paul Nihill — 1:36:40 (→ 30th place)

Men's Hammer Throw

- Chris Black

- Qualification — 70.76 m
- Final — 73.18 m (→ 7th place)

- Paul Dickenson

- Qualification — 68.52 m (→ did not advance, 14th place)

Women's Long Jump

- Sue Reeve

- Qualifying Round — 6.26m
- Final — 6.27m (→ 9th place)

== Cycling ==
Eleven cyclists represented Great Britain in 1976.

Individual road race

- Joseph Waugh — 4:49:01 (→ 35th place)
- Dudley Hayton — 4:54:26 (→ 43rd place)
- Philip Griffiths — did not finish (→ no ranking)
- William Nickson — did not finish (→ no ranking)

Team time trial

- Paul Carbutt
- Phil Griffiths
- Dudley Hayton
- William Nickson

Sprint

- Trevor Gadd — 12th place

1000m time trial

- Paul Medhurst — 1:10.167 (→ 19th place)

Individual pursuit

- Ian Hallam — 20th place

Team pursuit

- Ian Banbury
- Michael Bennett
- Robin Croker
- Ian Hallam

== Fencing ==
18 fencers, 13 men and 5 women, represented Great Britain in 1976.

Men's foil

- Graham Paul
- Rob Bruniges
- Barry Paul

Men's team foil

- Geoffrey Grimmett, Barry Paul, Rob Bruniges, Graham Paul, Nick Bell

Men's épée

- Ralph Johnson
- Teddy Bourne
- Tim Belson

Men's team épée

- Teddy Bourne, Bill Hoskyns, Ralph Johnson, Tim Belson, Martin Beevers

Men's sabre

- Richard Cohen
- John Deanfield
- Peter Mather

Men's team sabre

- Bill Hoskyns, Peter Mather, John Deanfield, Richard Cohen

Women's foil

- Susan Wrigglesworth
- Clare Halsted
- Wendy Ager

Women's team foil

- Wendy Ager, Susan Wrigglesworth, Hilary Cawthorne, Clare Halsted, Sue Green

== Modern pentathlon ==
Three male pentathletes represented Great Britain in 1976, winning gold in the team event.

Individual

- Adrian Parker
- Danny Nightingale
- Jim Fox

Team

- Adrian Parker
- Danny Nightingale
- Jim Fox

== Rowing ==
Men's double sculls

- Michael Hart, Chris Baillieu

- (→ Silver)

Men's coxless pair

- David Sturge, Henry Clay

- (→ 12th place)

Men's coxed pair

- Neil Christie, James MacLeod, David Webb

- (→ 7th place)

Men's quadruple scull

- Thomas Bishop, Mark Hayter, Andrew Justice, Allan Whitwell

- (→ 9th place)

Men's coxless four

- Richard Ayling, Bill Mason, Neil Keron, David Townsend

- (→ 12th place)

Men's eight

- Jim Clark, Tim Crooks, Richard Lester, Hugh Matheson, David Maxwell, Lenny Robertson, John Yallop, Patrick Sweeney, and Frederick Smallbone

- (→ Silver)

Women's coxless pair

- Lin Clark, Beryl Mitchell

- (→ 10th place)

Women's coxed four

- Gillian Webb, Pauline Bird-Hart, Clare Grove, Diana Bishop, Pauline Wright

- (→ 8th place)
