= Stuart Carter (rower) =

Australian rowing cox (1958–2025)

Personal information
- Nationality: Australian
- Born: 31 October 1958 Sydney, NSW
- Died: 7 October 2025 (aged 66) Cairns, Queensland
- Education: Newington College

Sport
- Sport: Rowing
- Club: Sydney Rowing Club

Achievements and titles
- Olympic finals: Montreal 1976 M8+
- National finals: King's Cup 1976-1979

Stuart Carter (31 October 1958 – 7 October 2025) was an Australian rowing coxswain. He was a ten-time national champion and a representative at world championships and Olympics. In 1976 still aged seventeen and in his final year of school, he coxed Sydney Rowing Club crews to three state titles in a pair, four and eight and to two national titles in a pair and a four; coxed the New South Wales representative eight to a King's Cup victory; and coxed the Australian men's eight at the 1976 Summer Olympics.

== Early life ==
Carter was born in Sydney, Australia, the second son of Anne and William Frederick Carter in 1958. He had one older sister Beverly and an older brother Andrew and from 1960 a younger brother Bruce. His father was a telecommunications engineer with the PMG Department in NSW. He was chosen by Paul Hasluck to create a Department of Posts and Telegrahs in Papua New Guinea. In 1975 when Bill Carter OBE retired after 30 years as the director of that department in Port Moresby he and his wife returned to live in Sydney. As Carter's family spent years in PNG he was a boarder at Newington College in Sydney. He coxed that school's first VIII in 1975 and was coached by his future club and representative coach Michael Morgan. In 1975 both the entire Newington and the Riverview first VIIIs were selected as New South Wales' #1 and #2 youth eights to contest the Noel Wilkinson Trophy at the Interstate Regatta within the Australian Rowing Championships. Carter coxed the New South Wales #2 crew to second place behind a Geelong College eight racing as Victoria's state entrant. In 1976, in his final year of school Carter joined the Sydney Rowing Club and picked up the ropes in the club's senior eight and its champion coxed four.

He steered the Sydney coxed four to a state title and a national championship win in 1976, and then successfully defended that same national title in 1977 1978 and 1979. In 1976 he was under the bow of a Sydney coxed pairing of Stephen Handley and Simon Dean who rowed to a national championship title. In 1977 he steered a composite pair of Dean and Mosman's Chris Shinners to a second place. In 1978 and 1979 he coxed an SRC pairing of Handley and Islay Lee to consecutive national titles.

Carter made senior state selection for New South Wales in 1976 in the men's eight which contested and won the King's Cup at the Interstate Regatta. In 1977 and 1978 he was again in the stern of the New South Wales's eights who successfully defended their King's Cup titles.

== International representative rowing ==
Carter was still aged seventeen when in 1976 he won state and national titles in every heavyweight coxed boat class and was the youngest ever coxswain selected to an Australian Olympic eight. The crew for the 1976 Montreal Olympics was mostly that year's King's Cup winning New South Wales crew excepting Malcolm Shaw in the two seat and Brian Richardson at bow. They commenced their Olympic campaign with a heat win in a new world record time and progressed to the final. In the heat Shaw suffered a severe back injury (a collapsed vertebra) which saw him out of the eight and replaced by Peter Shakespear, the reserve. In the final the Australians finished fifth.

Mosman's Terry O'Hanlon coxed the Australian eight at the 1977 World Rowing Championships but for the 1978 World Rowing Championships in Lake Karapiro, the successful New South King's Cup eight was again selected with Carter in the stern and composed of all Sydney men excepting Mosman's Gary Uebergang and Athol MacDonald. The Australian eight placed second in their heat, third in the repechage and in the final finished fourth being edged out for third by the host nation New Zealand.

== Death ==
Carter died from cancer on 7 October 2025, at the age of 66. in Cairns. His family held a memorial service in his honour in Cairns in November 2025.
