= Ian Clubb =

Australian rower (born 1955)

Personal information
- Nationality: Australian
- Born: 1 January 1955 (age 71)
- Education: Sydney Grammar

Sport
- Sport: Rowing
- Club: Sydney Rowing Club

Achievements and titles
- Olympic finals: Montreal 1976 M8+
- National finals: King's Cup 1975-1980; Aust Champion 1976-80 M4+ Aust Champion 1978 M2- Aust Champion 1978 M4X

Ian Clubb (born 1 January 1955) is an Australian Human Resources business executive and former Olympian rower. He was an eleven-time national champion rower who represented at four world championships and in the men's eight event at the 1976 Summer Olympics. He won five consecutive Australian national championship titles in a coxed four from 1976 to 1980.

== Rowing family ==
Born in Dubbo, New South Wales, Clubb attended Sydney Grammar School where he took up rowing and matriculated in 1973. His father Gordon Clubb Snr was a Sydney Rowing Club member from 1934 and a committee man from 1946. Gordon Clubb Snr had rowed for Australia as a single sculler in a 1940 Trans Tasman series against New Zealand and coached his sons at Sydney Rowing Club in the 1970s. Ian's older brother Gordon Clubb Jnr rowed with Ian in champion SRC and New South Wales King's Cup crews of the late 1970s and rowed for Australia from 1977 to 1979.

== Club and state rowing ==
Ian Clubb first made state selection for New South Wales in 1975 in the bow seat of the men's eight which contested and won the King's Cup at the Interstate Regatta within the Australian Rowing Championships. He rowed in four consecutive King's Cup winning New South Wales crews between 1975 and 1978 and then in two further New South Wales eights in 1979 and 1980.

For the 1975 Australian Championships the New South Wales King's Cup crew split down and contested the coxed four national title in two boats. Clubb wore Sydney colours and his crew placed third in that event. He rowed at three behind Islay Lee in a Sydney coxed four to a national championship win in 1976, and then successfully defended that same title in 1977 1978, 1979 and 1980 each time in the three seat. In 1978 in addition to the coxed four title, he also paired with his brother to win the national championship in a coxless pair and rowed in an all-Sydney quad to take the quad sculls title.

== International representative rowing ==
Clubb made his Australian representative debut in the five seat of the Australian men's eight selected for the 1975 World Rowing Championships in Nottingham. That crew placed second in its heat, won the repechage and finished in sixth place in the final.

The Australian men's eight for the 1976 Montreal Olympics was mostly that year's King's Cup winning New South Wales crew excepting Malcolm Shaw in the two seat and Brian Richardson at bow. With Clubb rowing at seven they commenced their Olympic campaign with a heat win in a new world record time and progressed to the final. In the heat Shaw suffered a collapsed vertebra which saw him out of the eight and replaced by Peter Shakespear, the reserve. In the final the Australians finished fifth.

Clubb rowed on after the 1976 Olympics and in 1977 was selected at seven in the Australian eight to contest the 1977 World Rowing Championships in Amsterdam. Six of the crew including his brother Gordon were from the Sydney Rowing Club's senior eight. They missed the A final and rowed to overall tenth place.

For the 1978 World Rowing Championships in Lake Karapiro, the successful New South Wales King's Cup eight was again selected and was composed of all Sydney men excepting Gary Uebergang and Athol MacDonald from Mosman. The Australian eight placed second in their heat, third in the repechage and in the final finished fourth being edged out for third by the host nation New Zealand.

At the 1979 World Rowing Championships in Lake Karapiro, Clubb rowed at three in the Australian coxless four stroked by his brother which was eliminated in the repechage. It was his final Australian representative appearance.

== Professional career ==
Clubb worked as a Human Resources executive in Australia and in the US. His career included positions at Apple Inc., Novell, SOCOG, Coles Group and HCF Health Insurance.
