= Tim Conrad =

Australian rower (born 1951)

Personal information
- Nationality: Australian
- Born: 6 January 1951 (age 75) Brisbane, Australia

Sport
- Sport: Rowing
- Club: Sydney University Boat Club; UNSW Rowing Club

Achievements and titles
- Olympic finals: Montreal 1976 M8+
- National finals: King's Cup 1972-1976

Tim Conrad (born 6 January 1951) is an Australian rowing coach and former Olympian rower. He was a five time national champion and competed in the men's eight event at the 1976 Summer Olympics.

== Club and state rowing ==
Raised in Brisbane, Conrad attended Brisbane State High School where he took up rowing and matriculated in 1969. He studied architecture at the University of Queensland and rowed in the university's men's eight at the 1971 Australian Intervarsity Championships. Conrad first made state selection for Queensland in the men's senior eight which contested the 1972 King's Cup at the Interstate Regatta.

In Sydney, Conrad rowed from firstly the Sydney University Boat Club and later the UNSW Rowing Club. He made state selection for New South Wales in the men's senior eight which contested the 1973 King's Cup at the Interstate Regatta. He then rowed in the victorious New South Wales eights of 1974, 1975 and 1976.

At the 1974 Australian Rowing Championships Conrad raced for Sydney University Boat Club in a coxed pair with Chris Shinners and in a coxed four both to second place. At the 1975 Australia Championships he won the coxless pair title in SUBC colours with Mosman's Malcolm Shaw. By 1976 he was rowing for UNSW Rowing Club and in a composite crew with Lee, Rob Paver and Ian Clubb of SRC he won the national coxed four title.

== International representative rowing ==
Conrad made a representative debut for Great Britain in a men's coxless pair which raced at the 1973 European Championships in Moscow and placed eighth overall. His pair partner Peter Shakespear was also an Australian by birth who would like Conrad, row for Australia.

The Australian men's eight for the 1976 Montreal Olympics was mostly that year's King's Cup winning New South Wales crew excepting Malcolm Shaw in the two seat and Brian Richardson at bow. With Conrad rowing at six they commenced their Olympic campaign with a heat win in a new world record time and progressed to the final. In the heat Shaw suffered a severe back injury (a collapsed vertebra) which saw him out of the eight and replaced by Shakespear, the reserve. In the final the Australians finished fifth.

== Coaching ==
Conrad commenced a long coaching career in 1978 with a University of Queensland crew at the 1978 Australian Intervarsity Championships. He coached at Sydney Rowing Club, at the University of Queensland and was in charge of various Queensland state representative crews for a number of years. By 2012 he was the Director of Rowing at the Queensland Academy of Sport.

Tim coached his son Sam Conrad who rowed for Australia, won a 2005 World Championship in a coxed pair and held a seat in the Australian men's eight from 2006 to 2008, rowing in that crew at the 2008 London Olympics.
