= Richard Lester (rower) =

British rower

Personal information
- Nationality: British
- Born: 24 March 1949 (age 77) Wallingford
Medal record
Men's rowing
Silver medal – second place	1976 Montreal	Eight

Richard C. Lester (born 24 March 1949 in Wallingford, Berkshire) is a retired British rower who competed in the 1976 Summer Olympics.

== Rowing career ==
Lester was selected by Great Britain as part of the coxed four at the 1975 World Rowing Championships in Nottingham, the four just missed out on a medal finishing in fourth place in the A final. In 1976 he was rowed at the Olympic Games in Montreal, he was a crew member of the British boat with John Yallop, Timothy Crooks, Hugh Matheson, David Maxwell, Jim Clark, Frederick Smallbone, Lenny Robertson and Patrick Sweeney, which won the silver medal in the men's eight.

== Personal life ==
He is the younger brother of Ken Lester.
