= Gordon Clubb =

Australian former rower

Personal information
- Nationality: Australian
- Born: 22 May 1953 (age 73)
- Education: Sydney Grammar School
- Children: Amelia Clubb, Will Clubb

Sport
- Sport: Rowing
- Club: Sydney Rowing Club

Achievements and titles
- National finals: King's Cup 1977–1980; Aust Champion 1977–80 M4+ Aust Champion 1978 M2- Aust Champion 1979 M4X

Gordon Clubb (born 22 May 1953) is an Australian former rower. He was an eight-time national champion rower who represented at three world championships. He won four consecutive Australian national championship titles in a coxed four from 1977 to 1980.

== Rowing family ==
Born in Dubbo, New South Wales, Clubb attended Sydney Grammar School where he took up rowing and matriculated in 1971. His father Gordon Clubb Snr was a Sydney Rowing Club member from 1934 and a committee man from 1946. Gordon Clubb Snr had rowed for Australia as a single sculler in a 1940 Trans Tasman series against New Zealand and coached his sons at Sydney Rowing Club in the 1970s. Gordon's younger brother Ian Clubb rowed in champion SRC and New South Wales King's Cup crews of the late 1970s and rowed for Australia from 1976 to 1979.

== Club and state rowing ==
Gordon Clubb first made state selection for New South Wales in 1977 in the six seat of the men's eight which contested and won the King's Cup at the Interstate Regatta within the Australian Rowing Championships. He rowed in another King's Cup winning New South Wales crews in 1978. He was a reserve for the New South Wales eight in 1979 and stroked the 1980 crew to second place.

At the 1974 Australian Championships Clubb contested the double scull national title with Kim Mackney and placed fourth in that event. He also rowed to second place in a composite coxless four. The following year in 1975 he contested both the coxed and coxless four titles in Sydney colours placing second and third.

At the 1976 Australian Championships Clubb contested the quad scull national title in a composite Sydney/Haberfield crew and placed second in that event. In 1977 he rowed to second place with Haberfield's Dick Reddel in an attempt at the coxless pair national title and that same year with his brother and Islay Lee in a Sydney coxed four he rowed to a national championship win. He then successfully defended that same title in 1978, 1979 and 1980 each time in the two seat. In 1978 paired with his brother he also won the national title in a coxless pair. In 1979 he also rowed in an all-Sydney quad to take the quad sculls title.

== International representative rowing ==
Clubb made his Australian representative debut in the six seat of the Australian men's eight selected for the 1977 World Rowing Championships in Amsterdam. Six of the crew including his brother Ian were from the Sydney Rowing Club's senior eight. They missed the A final and rowed to overall tenth place.

For the 1978 World Rowing Championships in Lake Karapiro, the successful New South Wales King's Cup eight was again selected and was composed of all Sydney men excepting Gary Uebergang and Athol MacDonald from Mosman. With Clubb seated at six, the Australian eight placed second in their heat, third in the repechage and in the final finished fourth being edged out for third by the host nation New Zealand.

At the 1979 World Rowing Championships in Lake Karapiro, sitting in front of his brother Clubb stroked the Australian coxless four which was eliminated in the repechage. It was the final Australian representative appearance of both Clubb brothers.
