= List of Owl Club members =

Member of Harvard University student group

Coordinates: 42.3715°N 71.1187°W

The following is a list of Owl Club members. The Owl Club is an all-male final club at Harvard University.

== Academia ==
- Archibald C. Coolidge, 1987 (Honorary), professor at Harvard University and first director of the Harvard University Library
- George Minot, 1908, professor of medicine at Harvard University, and winner of the 1934 Nobel Prize in Medicine
- William Gurdon Saltonstall, 1928, ninth principal of Phillips Exeter Academy

== Art and architecture ==
- George Biddle, 1908, muralist and painter

== Business ==
- Sean M. Healey, 1970, founder, chairman, and CEO of Affiliated Managers Group
- Ralph Hornblower III, 1970, chairman of Hornblower & Company and opera singer
- Raymond McGuire, 1979, former Global Head of Corporate and Investment Banking of Citigroup and current President of Lazard
- Bruce Menin 1984, real estate developer and co-founder of Crescent Heights
- Hardwick Simmons, 1962, CEO of the Nasdaq Stock Market, president and CEO of Prudential Securities

== Entertainment ==
- Andy Cadiff, 1977, producer and television director who directed Growing Pains and Home Improvement
- Rupert Hitzig, 1960, director, producer, actor, and screenwriter who produced The Last Dragon and Jaws 3
- Ralph Hornblower III, 1970, opera singer and chairman of Hornblower & Company
- Tommy Lee Jones 1969, actor who won the Academy Award for Best Supporting Actor in The Fugitive
- Andrew Susskind, 1976, film producer

== Law ==
- John G. Heyburn II, chief judge of the United States District Court for the Western District of Kentucky

== Military ==
- Edward B. Cole, 1902, United States Marine Corps Major, casualty at the Battle of Belleau Wood
- Hanford MacNider, 1911, United States Army Lieutenant General and Assistant Secretary of War
- J. William Middendorf, 1947, U.S. Secretary of the Navy and U.S. Ambassador to the Netherlands

== Politics ==
- Robert W. Bliss 1900, United States Minister to Sweden and United States Ambassador to Argentina
- John Bridgeland, 1982, director of the United States Domestic Policy Council and USA Freedom Corps
- Richard Darman, 1964, senior advisor to Presidents Ronald Reagan and George H. W. Bush
- Thomas Foley, 1975, United States Ambassador to Ireland
- Ford M. Fraker,1971, U.S. Ambassador to Saudi Arabia; president of the Middle East Policy Council
- Ted Kennedy, 1954, U.S. Senator from Massachusetts
- J. William Middendorf, 1947, U.S. Secretary of the Navy and U.S. Ambassador to the Netherlands
- Theodore Roosevelt III, 1936, Secretary of Commerce of Pennsylvania and grandson of President Theodore Roosevelt
- Hassan Nemazee, 1972, United States Ambassador to Argentina, investment banker,
- Owen West, 1991, Assistant Secretary of Defense for Special Operations and Low-Intensity Conflict

== Sports ==
- Colin Blackwell, 2016, NHL ice hockey player for the Chicago Blackhawks
- Richard Cashin, 1975, Member of the 1976 US Olympic rowing team
- Jack Drury 2022, NHL ice hockey player for the Carolina Hurricanes
- Anthony Fabiano, professional football player
- David Forst, 1998, professional baseball executive
- Adam Fox, 2020, NHL ice hockey player for the New York Rangers
- Charles Hamlin, 1970, member of the 1968 US Olympic rowing team
- Bobby Jones, 1924, winner of the Grand Slam in 1930; founder of Augusta National Golf Club and the Masters Tournament.
- Alexander Kerfoot 2017, NHL ice hockey player for the Toronto Maple Leafs
- Alex Laferriere 2023, NHL ice hockey player for the Los Angeles Kings
- Marshall Rifai, 2022, NHL ice hockey player for the Toronto Marlies
- Alan Shealy, 1975, member of the 1976 US Olympic rowing team
- Cole Toner, 2016, professional football player
- Reilly Walsh 2021, NHL ice hockey player for the New Jersey Devils
- David Weinberg, 1974, member of the 1976 US Olympic rowing team
- Dudley Wolfe, socialite, racing yacht owner, and mountaineer who died on the 1939 American Karakoram expedition to K2
- Jon Ledecky, 1979, Co-owner of the New York Islanders

== Other ==
- Charles Veley, 1987, claimant to the title of the world's most-traveled person
- Harry Elkins Widener 1907, casualty on the wreck of the RMS Titanic ocean liner, and namesake of Harvard's Widener Memorial Library
