= Rowing at the 1976 Summer Olympics – Men's eight =

Men's eight at the Games of the XXI Olympiad
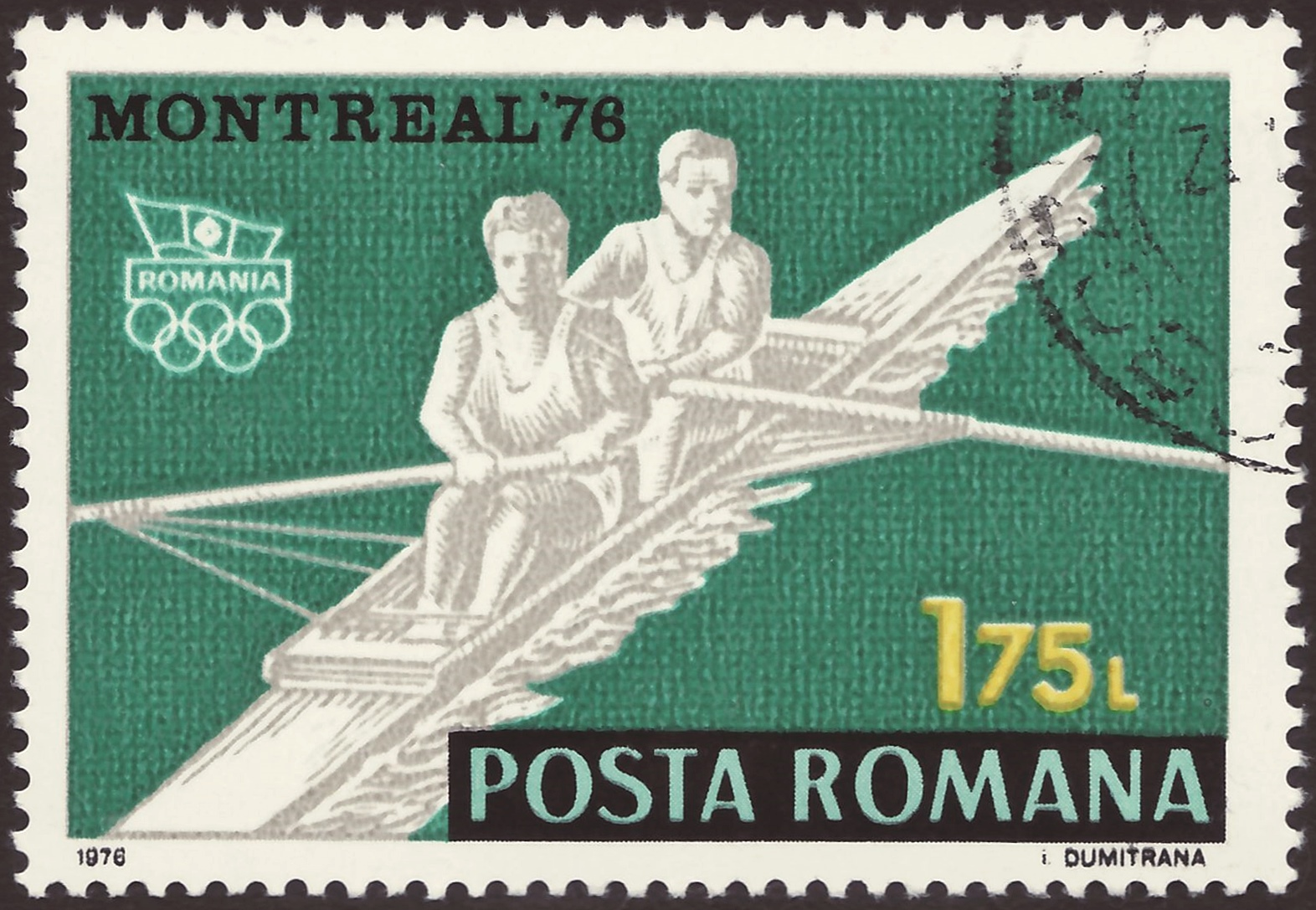
- Romania stamp commemorating rowing at the 1976 Olympics
- Venue: Olympic basin at Notre Dame Island
- Dates: 18–25 July 1976
- Competitors: 100 from 11 nations
- Winning time: 5:58.29

Medalists
| 1st place, gold medalist(s) | | East Germany: Bernd Baumgart; Gottfried Döhn; Werner Klatt; Hans-Joachim Lück; Dieter Wendisch; Roland Kostulski; Ulrich Karnatz; Karl-Heinz Prudöhl; Karl-Heinz Danielowski (cox) |
| 2nd place, silver medalist(s) | | Great Britain: Richard Lester; John Yallop; Tim Crooks; Hugh Matheson; David Maxwell; Jim Clark; Frederick Smallbone; Lenny Robertson; Patrick Sweeney (cox) |
| 3rd place, bronze medalist(s) | | New Zealand: Ivan Sutherland; Trevor Coker; Peter Dignan; Lindsay Wilson; Joe Earl; Dave Rodger; Alec McLean; Tony Hurt; Simon Dickie (cox) |

The men's eight competition at the 1976 Summer Olympics took place at the rowing basin on Notre Dame Island in Montreal, Quebec, Canada. It was held from 18 to 25 July and was won by the team from East Germany. It was East Germany's first victory in the event, improving on a bronze medal in 1972. The defending champions, New Zealand, switched places with the East Germans, taking bronze in 1976. Between them was Great Britain, taking its first men's eight medal since 1948. There were 11 boats (100 competitors, with Australia making one substitution) from 11 nations, with each nation limited to a single boat in the event.

== Background ==
This was the 17th appearance of the event. Rowing had been on the programme in 1896 but was cancelled due to bad weather. The men's eight has been held every time that rowing has been contested, beginning in 1900.

Whilst the East German team was considered to be the favourite, the event was wide open and many teams could have won it. The United States had in the past dominated the event and up until and including the 1964 Summer Olympics, they had won nine out of ten Olympic golds. Whilst their dominance had since waned, they were still considered possible medal contenders, as they had won the 1974 World Rowing Championships. East Germany had won the 1973 European Rowing Championships (the event was discontinued after 1973), and the 1975 World Rowing Championships, and they had won bronze at the 1972 Olympics. The New Zealand team had won the event at the previous Summer Olympics, had won bronze at the last two World Rowing Championships, and four of their 1972 Olympic rowers plus their cox returned to Montreal. Other medalists at these major rowing events were Czechoslovakia, the Soviet Union, and Great Britain.

No nations made their debut in the event. The United States made its 15th appearance, most among nations to that point.

=== Previous M8+ competitions ===
| Competition | Gold | Silver | Bronze |
|---|---|---|---|
| 1972 Summer Olympics | New Zealand | United States | East Germany |
| 1973 European Rowing Championships | East Germany | Czechoslovakia | Soviet Union |
| 1974 World Rowing Championships | United States | Great Britain | New Zealand |
| 1975 World Rowing Championships | East Germany | Soviet Union | New Zealand |

== Competition format ==
The "eight" event featured nine-person boats, with eight rowers and a coxswain. It was a sweep rowing event, with the rowers each having one oar (and thus each rowing on one side). This rowing competition consisted of two main rounds (semifinals and finals; down from three main rounds in 1927 with a smaller field), as well as a repechage round after the semifinals. The course used the 2000 metres distance that became the Olympic standard in 1912 (with the exception of 1948). Races were held in up to six lanes.

- Semifinals: Two heats with five or six boats each. The top boat in each semifinal (2 boats total) went to the "A" final, while the remaining boats went to the repechage.
- Repechage: Two heats with four or five boats each. The top two boats in each heat (4 boats total) advanced to the "A" final, with the remainder (5 boats) to the "B" final (out of medal contention).
- Finals: The "A" final consisted of the top six boats, competing for the medals and 4th through 6th place. The "B" final had the next five boats; they competed for 7th through 11th place.

== Schedule ==
All times are Eastern Daylight Time (UTC-4)

| Date | Time | Round |
|---|---|---|
| Sunday, 18 July 1976 | 15:00 | Semifinals |
| Tuesday, 20 July 1976 | 12:00 | Repechage |
| Sunday, 25 July 1976 | 14:05 | Finals |

== Results ==
=== Semifinals ===
==== Semifinal 1 ====
| Rank | Rowers | Coxswain | Nation | Time | Notes |
|---|---|---|---|---|---|
| 1 | Malcolm Shaw; Ian Clubb; Tim Conrad; Gary Uebergang; Islay Lee; Athol MacDonald; Robert Paver; Brian Richardson | Stuart Carter | Australia | 5:39.07 | QA |
| 2 | Trevor Coker; Lindsay Wilson; Peter Dignan; Joe Earl; Tony Hurt; Alec McLean; Dave Rodger; Ivan Sutherland | Simon Dickie | New Zealand | 5:40.00 | R |
| 3 | Richard Cashin; Steve Christiansen; John Everett; David Fellows; Michael Hess; Chip Lubsen; Mark Norelius; Alan Shealy | David Weinberg | United States | 5:42.05 | R |
| 4 | Luis Alonso; Humberto Dorrego; Israel Gorguet; Francisco Mora; Hermenegildo Palacio; Angel Ramírez; Porfirio Reynoso; Alcides Risco | Jesús Rosello | Cuba | 5:44.30 | R |
| 5 | Ron Burak; George Tintor; Patrick Croskerry; Dirk Gidney; James Henniger; Mel LaForme; Alexander Manson; Edgar Smith | Robert Choquette | Canada | 6:04.83 | R |
| 6 | Tomiaki Iso; Masanobu Yamamoto; Kenji Kaneyasu; Toshihai Kitaura; Shiro Mataki; Shigeru Miyagawa; Takashi Murayama; Hiroshi Toriba | Akio Kakishita | Japan | 6:08.11 | R |

==== Semifinal 2 ====
| Rank | Rowers | Coxswain | Nation | Time | Notes |
|---|---|---|---|---|---|
| 1 | Bernd Baumgart; Dieter Wendisch; Gottfried Döhn; Ulrich Karnatz; Werner Klatt; Roland Kostulski; Hans-Joachim Lück; Karl-Heinz Prudöhl | Karl-Heinz Danielowski | East Germany | 5:32.17 | QA |
| 2 | Jim Clark; Tim Crooks; Richard Lester; Hugh Matheson; David Maxwell; Lenny Robertson; Frederick Smallbone; John Yallop | Patrick Sweeney | Great Britain | 5:36.97 | R |
| 3 | Antanas Čikotas; Anatoly Ivanov; Igor Konnov; Anatoly Nemtyryov; Aleksandr Plyushkin; Vasily Potapov; Aleksandr Shitov; Vladimir Vasilyev | Vladimir Zharov | Soviet Union | 5:37.79 | R |
| 4 | Pavel Konvička; Karel Mejta Jr.; Václav Mls; Josef Neštický; Josef Plamínek; Josef Pokorný; Lubomír Zapletal; Miroslav Vraštil Sr. | Jiří Pták | Czechoslovakia | 5:43.94 | R |
| 5 | Frithjof Henckel; Otmar Kaufhold; Reinhard Wendemuth; Wolf-Dieter Oschlies; Volker Sauer; Frank Schütze; Wolfram Thiem; Bernd Truschinski | Helmut Latz | West Germany | 5:48.30 | R |

=== Repechage ===
==== Repechage heat 1 ====
New Zealand changed seats for seven of its eight rowers. West Germany and Japan changed seats for all eight rowers. The Soviet team changed seats 1 to 7. The team from Cuba changed seats for seven rowers.

| Rank | Rowers | Coxswain | Nation | Time | Notes |
|---|---|---|---|---|---|
| 1 | Ivan Sutherland; Trevor Coker; Peter Dignan; Lindsay Wilson; Joe Earl; Dave Rodger; Alec McLean; Tony Hurt | Simon Dickie | New Zealand | 5:37.08 | QA |
| 2 | Reinhard Wendemuth; Bernd Truschinski; Frank Schütze; Frithjof Henckel; Wolfram Thiem; Volker Sauer; Otmar Kaufhold; Wolf-Dieter Oschlies | Helmut Latz | West Germany | 5:37.76 | QA |
| 3 | Aleksandr Shitov; Antanas Čikotas; Vasily Potapov; Aleksandr Plyushkin; Anatoly Nemtyryov; Igor Konnov; Anatoly Ivanov; Vladimir Vasilyev | Vladimir Zharov | Soviet Union | 5:40.65 | QB |
| 4 | Israel Gorguet; Francisco Mora; Hermenegildo Palacio; Angel Ramírez; Luis Alonso; Humberto Dorrego; Alcides Risco | Jesús Rosello | Cuba | 5:47.33 | QB |
| 5 | Shigeru Miyagawa; Toshihai Kitaura; Masanobu Yamamoto; Takashi Murayama; Hiroshi Toriba; Kenji Kaneyasu; Tomiaki Iso; Shiro Mataki | Akio Kakishita | Japan | 6:11.06 | QB |

==== Repechage heat 2 ====
Great Britain changed five of its seats, including the stroke. Czechoslovakia changed seats 2 to 6. Canada changed seven of the eight seats.

| Rank | Rowers | Coxswain | Nation | Time | Notes |
|---|---|---|---|---|---|
| 1 | Richard Lester; John Yallop; Timothy Crooks; Hugh Matheson; David Maxwell; Jim Clark; Frederick Smallbone; Lenny Robertson | Patrick Sweeney | Great Britain | 5:40.00 | QA |
| 2 | Pavel Konvička; Václav Mls; Josef Plamínek; Josef Pokorný; Karel Mejta Jr.; Josef Neštický; Lubomír Zapletal; Miroslav Vraštil Sr. | Jiří Pták | Czechoslovakia | 5:43.81 | QA |
| 3 | Richard Cashin; Steve Christiansen; John Everett; David Fellows; Michael Hess; Chip Lubsen; Mark Norelius; Alan Shealy | David Weinberg | United States | 5:48.60 | QB |
| 4 | Edgar Smith; Dirk Gidney; George Tintor; James Henniger; Patrick Croskerry; Mel LaForme; Ron Burak; Alexander Manson | Robert Choquette | Canada | 5:48.94 | QB |

=== Finals ===
The two finals were rowed on 25 July. The only team that did not change seats during the competition was the United States.

==== Final B ====
| Rank | Rowers | Coxswain | Nation | Time |
|---|---|---|---|---|
| 7 | Aleksandr Shitov; Antanas Čikotas; Vasily Potapov; Aleksandr Plyushkin; Anatoly Nemtyryov; Igor Konnov; Anatoly Ivanov; Vladimir Vasilyev | Vladimir Zharov | Soviet Union | 6:05.88 |
| 8 | Edgar Smith; Dirk Gidney; George Tintor; James Henniger; Patrick Croskerry; Mel LaForme; Ron Burak; Alexander Manson | Robert Choquette | Canada | 6:09.03 |
| 9 | Richard Cashin; Steve Christiansen; John Everett; David Fellows; Michael Hess; Chip Lubsen; Mark Norelius; Alan Shealy | David Weinberg | United States | 6:11.07 |
| 10 | Israel Gorguet; Francisco Mora; Hermenegildo Palacio; Angel Ramírez; Luis Alonso; Humberto Dorrego; Alcides Risco; Porfirio Reynoso | Jesús Rosello | Cuba | 6:14.86 |
| 11 | Shigeru Miyagawa; Toshihai Kitaura; Masanobu Yamamoto; Takashi Murayama; Hiroshi Toriba; Kenji Kaneyasu; Tomiaki Iso; Shiro Mataki | Akio Kakishita | Japan | 6:33.33 |

==== Final A ====
East Germany changed five seats for the final. After Malcolm Shaw as stroke injured his back in the elimination race, Australia replaced him with Peter Shakespear for the final.

| Rank | Rowers | Coxswain | Nation | Time |
|---|---|---|---|---|
| 1st place, gold medalist(s) | Bernd Baumgart; Gottfried Döhn; Werner Klatt; Hans-Joachim Lück; Dieter Wendisch; Roland Kostulski; Ulrich Karnatz; Karl-Heinz Prudöhl | Karl-Heinz Danielowski | East Germany | 5:58.29 |
| 2nd place, silver medalist(s) | Richard Lester; John Yallop; Timothy Crooks; Hugh Matheson; David Maxwell; Jim Clark; Frederick Smallbone; Lenny Robertson | Patrick Sweeney | Great Britain | 6:00.82 |
| 3rd place, bronze medalist(s) | Ivan Sutherland; Trevor Coker; Peter Dignan; Lindsay Wilson; Joe Earl; Dave Rodger; Alec McLean; Tony Hurt | Simon Dickie | New Zealand | 6:03.51 |
| 4 | Reinhard Wendemuth; Bernd Truschinski; Frank Schütze; Frithjof Henckel; Wolfram Thiem; Volker Sauer; Otmar Kaufhold; Wolf-Dieter Oschlies | Helmut Latz | West Germany | 6:06.15 |
| 5 | Islay Lee; Ian Clubb; Tim Conrad; Robert Paver; Gary Uebergang; Athol MacDonald; Peter Shakespear; Brian Richardson | Stuart Carter | Australia | 6:09.75 |
| 6 | Pavel Konvička; Václav Mls; Josef Plamínek; Josef Pokorný; Karel Mejta Jr.; Josef Neštický; Lubomír Zapletal; Miroslav Vraštil Sr. | Jiří Pták | Czechoslovakia | 6:14.29 |
