= Kitaura =

Kitaura may refer to:

- Lake Kitaura, a lake in Japan
- Kitaura, Ibaraki, a former town in Namegata District, Ibaraki Prefecture, Japan
- Kitaura, Miyazaki, a former town in Higashiusuki District, Miyazaki Prefecture, Japan
- Kitaura Station (disambiguation), multiple railway stations in Japan

== People with the surname ==
- Toshihai Kitaura (北浦 俊治, born 1952), Japanese rower
