= Tintor =

Tintor (Serbian Cyrillic: Tинтop) is a Serbian surname. Notable people with the surname include:

- George Tintor (1957–2021), Canadian rower
- Miloš Tintor (born 1986), Serbian footballer
- Vladimir Tintor (disambiguation), multiple people
