= Islay Lee =

Australian rower (born 1949)

Personal information
- Nationality: Australian
- Born: 4 October 1949 (age 77)

Sport
- Sport: Rowing

Achievements and titles
- Olympic finals: Montreal 1976 M8+ Moscow 1980 M8+
- National finals: President's Cup 1971-1973; King's Cup 1976-1980

Islay Lee (born 4 October 1949) is an Australian former rower. He was a fifteen-time national champion in both sculls (four times) and sweep-oared boats (eleven times), a national representative at world championships and a dual Olympian. He competed at the 1976 Summer Olympics and the 1980 Summer Olympics. From 1976 to 1980 he was Australia's prominent sweep-oared stroke, setting the pace in Sydney Rowing Club crews which won five successive national titles in the coxed four, three successive titles in a coxed pair, and in three successive King's Cup winning New South Wales selection eights.

== Club and state rowing ==
Lee was born and raised in Lismore in northern New South Wales. and attended Sydney University. In Sydney he rowed first from the Sydney University Boat Club, then the Glebe Rowing Club and then had a long and successful association with the Sydney Rowing Club.

He contested the Australian Intervarsity Championships on three occasions representing the SUBC. He won the men's single scull in 1973 after having twice rowed to second place in that event in 1968 and 1971.

In 1968 at the Australian Rowing Championships he contested the national double sculls title in SUBC colours, placing second. At the 1970 Australian Rowing Championships he raced for Glebe and won a men's junior scull, a category at that time for rowers who had not yet won a senior race in that boat category. In 1972 in Glebe colours he won the national double scull title rowing with Haberfield's Dick Redell. By 1976 he was rowing from Sydney Rowing Club and that year in a composite Haberfield/Sydney crew won the national quad sculls title.

By 1976 at Sydney he had also taken up sweep oared rowing. He stroked a Sydney coxed four to a national championship win in 1976, and then successfully defended that same title in 1977 1978, 1979 and 1980 each time in the stroke seat. In 1978 he also joined with Stephen Handley in a coxed pair, winning that national title. Lee and Handley successfully defended that pairs title together in 1979 and 1980.

Lee first made state selection for New South Wales in 1971 picked as the single sculls entrant to contest the President's Cup at the Interstate Regatta. He finished third. The following year he won that title and then in 1973 he placed fourth. In 1976 he was selected to stroke the New South Wales men's eight to contest the King's Cup at the Interstate Regatta. He held that seat from 1976 to 1978 and led New South Wales to three consecutive wins. He was seated at six in the 1980 New South Wales eight which rowed to a second placing in the King's Cup.

== International representative rowing ==
Australia's men's eight for the 1976 Montreal Olympics was mostly that year's King's Cup winning New South Wales crew excepting Malcolm Shaw in the two seat and Brian Richardson at bow. Lee stroked the crew which commenced their Olympic campaign with a win in the heat in a new world record time and they progressed to the final. However in the heat Shaw suffered a severe back injury (a collapsed vertebra) which put him out of the eight and replaced by Peter Shakespear, the reserve. In the final the Australians finished fifth.

Lee rowed on after the 1976 Olympics and in 1977 he was selected at stroke in the Australian eight to contest the 1977 World Rowing Championships in Amsterdam. Six of the crew including Lee were from the Sydney Rowing Club senior eight. They missed the A final and rowed to overall tenth place. For the 1978 World Rowing Championships in Lake Karapiro, the successful New South Wales King's Cup eight was again selected with Lee at stroke and composed of all Sydney men excepting Mosman's Gary Uebergang and Athol MacDonald. The Australian eight placed second in their heat, third in the repechage and in the final finished fourth being edged out for third by the host nation New Zealand.

For the 1980 Moscow Olympics the new Australian Director of Coaching Reinhold Batschi utilised small boating racing criteria and selected an eight with rowers from three states. Lee and Steve Handley were selected at two and three. The Australian eight finished in fifth place in the Olympic final.

== Teaching and coaching ==
Post-competitive rowing Lee was a selector of Australian crews for the 1981 and 1982 World Junior Championships and of senior crews for the 1982 World Rowing Championships. He was a board member of Rowing Australia for a number of years and was President from 1994 to 1996.

Lee pursued a career as a teacher. He was a long-standing headmaster at Rockhampton Grammar School retiring in 2009. For a time he was the Head of Rowing at Brisbane Boys College.
