= Robert Paver =

Australian rower

Rob Paver
Personal information
- Full name: Robert D. Paver
- Nationality: Australian
- Born: 11 August 1952 (age 73)
- Education: The King's School; UNSW
- Height: 198 cm (6 ft 6 in)
- Weight: 94 kg (207 lb)

Sport
- Sport: Rowing
- Club: Sydney Rowing Club

Achievements and titles
- Olympic finals: Munich 1972 M8+ Montreal 1976 M8+
- National finals: King's Cup 1972–1976

Robert D. Paver (born 11 August 1952) is an Australian dermatologist and Mohs surgeon and a former national representative rower. As a rower he was a four-time Australian champion who represented at world championships and competed at the 1972 Summer Olympics and the 1976 Summer Olympics.

== State and club rowing ==
Paver was educated at The King's School in Sydney where he took up rowing. He matriculated in 1970. He rowed at university with the UNSW Rowing Club (UNSW) and his senior club rowing was from the Sydney Rowing Club. At the 1971 and 1973 Australian Intervarsity Championships he rowed in the UNSW eight.

Paver first made state selection for New South Wales in 1972 in the four seat of the men's eight which contested and won the King's Cup at the Interstate Regatta within the Australian Rowing Championships. He rowed in New South Wales King's Cup crews in 1973, 1975, 1976 and those crews of 1975 and 1976 were victorious.

In 1974 in SRC colours Paver contested both the coxed and coxless four titles at the Australian Rowing Championships in composite New South Wales crews. In 1975 and 1976 he contested the coxed four championship winning that national title in 1976.

== International representative rowing ==
The entire New South Wales winning King's Cup eight of 1972 was selected as the Australian eight to compete at the 1972 Munich Olympics and Paver who'd just turned 20, made his Australian representative debut in the four seat of that boat. They rowed to an overall eighth-place finish in Munich.

For the 1975 World Rowing Championships in Nottingham, Paver was back in the Australian men's eight and seated at four. That crew placed second in its heat, won the repechage and finished in sixth place in the final. The Australian men's eight for the 1976 Montreal Olympics was mostly that year's King's Cup winning New South Wales crew excepting Malcolm Shaw in the two seat and Brian Richardson at bow. With Paver rowing at seven they commenced their Olympic campaign with a heat win in a new world record time and progressed to the final. In the heat Shaw suffered a collapsed vertebra which saw him out of the eight and replaced by Peter Shakespear, the reserve. In the final – for which Paver moved to the five seat – the Australians finished fifth.

== Professional career ==
Paver graduated in medicine in 1978 from the University of New South Wales. An Associate Professor, he is a Consultant Dermatologist at Westmead Hospital and has a private practice in Western Sydney. His father Ken Paver (1920–2011) was also a Dermatologist, and was Chairman of that department at St Vincent's Hospital, Sydney from 1966 to 1975.
