= Timothy Conrad =

Timothy Conrad may refer to:

- Tim Conrad (born 1951), Australian rowing coach and rower
- Timothy Abbott Conrad (1803–1877), American geologist and malacologist
