= Gidney =

Gidney is a surname. Notable people with the surname include:

- Brian Gidney (1938–2019), English cricketer
- Craig Laurance Gidney, American novelist and writer
- Dirk Gidney (born 1952), Canadian rower
- Francis Gidney (1890–1928), leader of the Scouting movement in the United Kingdom
- Sir Henry Gidney (1873–1942), English research scholar and a lecturer in ophthalmology
- Herbert Gidney (1881–1963), American athlete

== See also ==
- Gidney was also the name of one of the Moon Men on the American animated television program Rocky and Bullwinkle.
