= Angel Ramirez =

Angel Ramirez may refer to:

- Angel Ramirez (politician), American politician
- Angel Ramírez (rower) (born 1955), Cuban rower
- Angel Peña Ramírez (born 1978), Puerto Rican politician
- Ángel de Saavedra, 3rd Duke of Rivas (1791–1865), Spanish poet, dramatist and politician
