= Michael Hess =

Michael Hess may refer to:

- Michael A. Hess (1952–1995), lawyer and chief legal counsel to the Republican National Committee
- Michael L. Hess, professor of medicine
- Michael Hess (rower) (born 1955), American Olympic rower
