= Latza =

Latza is a surname. Notable people with the surname include:

- Danny Latza (born 1989), German footballer
- Hans Latza (1908–1975), German SS judge

== See also ==
- Latz
