= Alexander Manson =

Alexander Manson may refer to:

- Alexander Manson (physician), Scottish physician
- Alexander Malcolm Manson (1883–1964) British Columbia judge and politician
- Alexander Manson (rower) (born 1953), Canadian Olympic rower
- Alexander Philip Manson, Lord-Lieutenant of Aberdeenshire
