= The Boat Race 1973 =

119th Boat Race
- Date: 7 April 1973
- Winner: Cambridge
- Margin of victory: 13 lengths
- Winning time: 19 minutes 21 seconds
- Overall record (Cambridge–Oxford): 67–51
- Umpire: Ronnie Howard (Oxford)

Other races
- Reserve winner: Goldie
- Women's winner: Cambridge

The 119th Boat Race took place on 7 April 1973. Held annually, the Boat Race is a side-by-side rowing race between crews from the Universities of Oxford and Cambridge along the River Thames. It was won by Cambridge who passed the finishing post thirteen lengths ahead of Oxford, the largest winning margin since the 1955 race. Despite being pre-race favourites, Oxford's warm-up saw them take on board a large amount of water in rough conditions.

In the reserve race, Goldie beat Isis, and in the Women's Boat Race, Cambridge were victorious.

== Background ==
The Boat Race is a side-by-side rowing competition between the University of Oxford (sometimes referred to as the "Dark Blues") and the University of Cambridge (sometimes referred to as the "Light Blues"). First held in 1829, the race takes place on the 4.2 miles (6.8 km) Championship Course on the River Thames in southwest London. The rivalry is a major point of honour between the two universities and followed throughout the United Kingdom and broadcast worldwide. Cambridge went into the race as reigning champions, having beaten Oxford by 9 1/2 lengths in the previous year's race. Cambridge held the overall lead, with 66 victories to Oxford's 51 (excluding the "dead heat" of 1877). The race was umpired by former Oxford Blue Ronnie Howard who had rowed in the 1957 and 1959 races.

BBC radio broadcaster John Snagge was "surprised" that the BBC decided not to broadcast the race in whole.

The first Women's Boat Race took place in 1927, but did not become an annual fixture until the 1960s. Up until 2014, the contest was conducted as part of the Henley Boat Races, but as of the 2015 race, it is held on the River Thames, on the same day as the men's main and reserve races. The reserve race, contested between Oxford's Isis boat and Cambridge's Goldie boat has been held since 1965. It usually takes place on the Tideway, prior to the main Boat Race.

It was the first year since 1927 that the main race was not covered in full on any of the BBC's national radio networks. Its 4.15pm start coincided with the conclusion of the FA Cup semi-finals, and it had been decided that the rowing would be broadcast in full on the BBC World Service and BBC Radio Oxford only. Commentator John Snagge who had described every race since 1931 was disappointed: "I do not want to be unreasonable but I am a little surprised that for an event like the Boat Race, with its tradition and history, the BBC cannot find 20 minutes on one of its four networks to carry it in full."

Oxford's preparations for the race including coming second only to Leander Club in the Head of the River Race. Both crews had to cope with strong winds in their outings, with large pieces of driftwood providing additional hazards to the boats. Cambridge's number four, Chris Baillieu, recovered from a back injury while his cox, Mike Williams, spent time before the race recuperating from an upset stomach. Their number seven, Steven Tourek, was also forced from the boat with illness, missing several days training. Cambridge were coxed by Lou Barry. Oxford's boat, built by Swiss manufacturer Stämpfli was considered suitable for "placid Continental lakes" while Cambridge's boat, while 30 pounds (14 kg) lighter than their previous year's craft, had a deeper hull and was "better equipped" for inclement conditions. In an interview with Barry Norman writing for The Observer, Oxford's stroke Sawyier had prophetically suggested: "if we do lose, I hope we're not disgraced ... it would be a kind of tawdry end of the year to be in a crew that was beaten out of sight."

== Crews ==
The Cambridge crew weighed over 5 pounds (2.3 kg) per rower more than their opponents. Oxford saw four former Blues return, Magarey, Hall, Payne and the cox Yalouris, while Cambridge welcomed back Chris Baillieu for his fourth race and Michael Hart. Oxford's crew contained three non-British competitors, Australian Magarey, and Americans Yalouris and Sawyier (who had rowed for Harvard University and the United States Olympic team in the 1972 Summer Olympics), while Cambridge featured just one foreign participant, the American rower Tourek.

Seat	Oxford			Cambridge		
Seat	Name	College	Weight	Name	College	Weight
Bow	R. G. A. Westlake	Christ Church	12 st 13 lb	J. D. Lever	1st & 3rd Trinity	12 st 10 lb
2	J. S. Ollivant	Worcester	12 st 3 lb	H. R. Jacobs	Pembroke	13 st 6 lb
3	M. R. Magarvey	Magdalen	14 st 1 lb	R. P. B. Duncan	St Catharine's	13 st 10 lb
4	P. D. P. Angier	Corpus Christi	11 st 13 lb	C. L. Baillieu (P)	Jesus	13 st 10 lb
5	S. G. Irving	Keble	13 st 8 lb	D. P. Sturge	Lady Margaret Boat Club	13 st 10 lb
6	A. J. Hall (P)	Keble	14 st 13 lb	M. O. K. Webber	Jesus	13 st 10 lb
7	D. R. Payne	Balliol	12 st 12 lb	S. C. Tourek	1st & 3rd Trinity	14 st 4 lb
Stroke	D. R. Sawyier	Christ Church	13 st 8 lb	M. J. Hart	Peterhouse	13 st 12 lb
Cox	E. Yalouris	Merton	8 st 10 lb	M. D. Williams	Trinity Hall	9 st 3 lb
Source: (P) – Boat club president

== Race ==
The Championship Course along which the Boat Race is contested

Following good performances in practice in the buildup, Oxford were considered pre-race favourites. They won the toss and elected to start on the Surrey station, handing the Middlesex side of the river to Cambridge. In the warm-up to the race, the Light Blues opted for calm waters in Wandsworth Reach while Oxford rowed part of the course, in rough conditions, up to the Mile Post and back. Arriving back at the stake boat, the Dark Blues spent considerable time attempting to alleviate their boat of large amounts of water, using their tracksuits as makeshift sponges.

Oxford made a fast start, rating over 40 strokes per minute, but in the rough conditions it resulted in more water being drawn into their boat. Cambridge "slowly but surely" took control with a lead of just under three lengths within three minutes of the start. A ten-second lead at the Mile Post was extended to sixteen seconds by Hammersmith Bridge with Oxford still taking on more water in their pursuit of the Light Blues. Oxford were 26 seconds behind at Chiswick Steps and despite a last push from Oxford to reduce the deficit, Cambridge passed the finishing post in 19 minutes 21 seconds, 13 lengths and 48 seconds ahead of their opponents. It was Cambridge's sixth consecutive victory, and their 67th overall to Oxford's 51 wins.

In the reserve race, Cambridge's Goldie beat Oxford's Isis by five lengths, their seventh consecutive victory. In the 28th running of the Women's Boat Race, Cambridge triumphed, their eleventh consecutive victory.

== Reaction ==
The Oxford boat club president Andy Hall said "the water was round our ankles ... we made a mistake in doing that warm-up over part of the course ... there was so much water on board that I thought 'God, we're going to sink.' It was really hopeless after that." In losing the race, Hall became the first Oxonian to lose four Boat Races in the 20th century. Jim Railton, writing in The Times summarised the race: "Cambridge beat the Tideway and the Tideway beat Oxford." According to Dickie Burnell, "to say that the race was soon over would be a mis-statement. It never really began."
