= 1972 British Rowing Championships =

- Venue: National Water Sports Centre
- Location: Holme Pierrepont (Nottingham)
- Dates: 22–23 July 1972

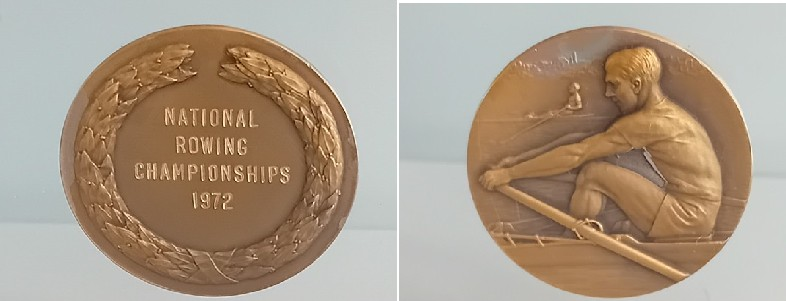
Medallion awarded to the finalists of the junior men's coxed four

The 1972 National Rowing Championships was the first edition of the National Championships, held from 22 to 23 July 1972 at the National Water Sports Centre in Holme Pierrepont, Nottingham. These inaugural Championships were held at the newly opened National Watersports Centre in Nottingham.

The Wallingford pair of Tony Norris and Doug Richardson won the junior pair and finished second behind Mike Hart and David Maxwell in the senior pair. Hart & Maxwell would compete at the Olympics shortly afterwards.

== Senior ==
=== Medal summary ===
Event	Gold	Silver	Bronze
Victor Ludorum	Tideway Scullers School	Leander	London University
Men 1x	Poplar Blackwall and District; Kenny Dwan	Cambridge University; Chris Baillieu	Newcastle University; Mark Hayter
Men 2+	Cambridge University / Tideway Scullers School; Mike Hart, David Maxwell, Alan Inns (cox)	Wallingford; Tony Norris, Doug Richardson	Furnivall SC
Men 2x	Tideway Scullers School / Leander; Patrick Delafield & Tim Crooks	Durham; Geoff Potts & Tom Bishop	Quintin; Brian Fentiman
Men 2-	Vesta / Argosies; Matthew Cooper & Jeremiah McCarthy	St Ives * & Tideway Scullers School / London*	Not awarded
Men 4-	Thames Tradesmen's; Bill Mason, Jim Clark, Lenny Robertson, Frederick Smallbone	Marlow	Kingston
Men 4+	Tideway Scullers School / Leander; Christopher Pierce, Alan Almand, Hugh Matheson, Dick Findlay, Patrick Sweeney (cox)	Wallingford	Nottingham & Union
Men 8+	Tideway Scullers School / Leander; George Proffitt, Eddie Wells, Martin Spencer, Rooney Massara, David Gramolt, Nick Hornsby, Christopher Rodrigues, Graeme Hall, Alan Inns (cox)	London University	Leander
Women 1x	Jessamy Scullers; Margaret Gladden	Jessamy Scullers; Christine Davies	Durham; Diana Preston
Women 2x	Jessamy Scullers; Margaret Gladden & Christine Davies	United Universities / Durham; Jean Rankine & Diana Preston	
Women 4+	St George's Ladies; Janis Long, Ann Shackell, Margaret Goodsman, Beryl Martin, Di Ellis (cox)	Civil Service A	Civil Service B Maggie Lambourn

* equal second

== Junior ==
=== Medal summary ===
Event	Gold	Silver	Bronze
Men 1x	Bedford; Tony Ward	Wallingford; A. Cusack	Pangbourne College; Graham Innes
Men 2-	Radley College; J.R. Simpson, David Searle	Becket School	Hampton School / Bedford Modern School
Men 2x	Henley / Weybridge; N.J.Gorvin, M.J.Webb	Eton College	Shrewsbury School
Men 2+	Wallingford; Tony Norris, Doug Richardson	Durham	Crowland
Men 4-	Radley College	King's School Chester	Shrewsbury School
Men 4+	University College School	Hampton School	Durham School
Men 8	Eton College	Emanuel School	
Men J16 1x	Westminster School; A. Hudson	Molesey; J. Knight	Shrewsbury School; J.A. Hanna
Men J16 2-	City Orient		
Men J16 4+	Wallingford Schools		
Women 4+	George Watson's College		

Key

Symbol	meaning
1, 2, 4, 8	crew size
+	coxed
-	coxless
x	sculls
14	Under-14
15	Under-15
16	Under-16
J	Junior
