= Henniger =

Henniger is a surname. Notable people with the name include:

- Ezra Churchill Henniger (1873–1959), Canadian politician
- Ezra Henniger (1927–1990), Canadian middle-distance runner
- James Henniger (1954–2004), Canadian rower
