= Alan Inns =

British rower

Personal information
- Full name: Alan Frederick Inns
- Nationality: British
- Born: 28 August 1945 (age 80) Hammersmith, England

Sport
- Sport: Rowing
- Retired: 10/02/2024
- Now coaching: Coached Gordon's school rowing until 10/02/2024

Alan Frederick Inns (born 28 August 1945) is a British rowing cox. He competed at the 1972 Summer Olympics, 1980 Summer Olympics and the 1984 Summer Olympics. He won the coxed pairs title with Michael Hart and David Maxwell and the eights title, at the 1972 National Rowing Championships.
