= Igor Konnov =

Russian rower

Personal information
- Nationality: Russian
- Born: 3 August 1954; Tver, Russian SFSR, Soviet Union
- Died: 2002 (aged 47–48)

Sport
- Sport: Rowing

Igor Konnov (3 August 1954 – 2002) was a Russian rower. He competed in the men's eight event at the 1976 Summer Olympics.
