= Geoff Potts =

British rower

Personal information
- Birth name: Geoffrey Potts
- Born: 1947
- Died: 28 October 2017

Sport
- Sport: Rowing
- Club: Durham University BC; Tees RC; Durham ARC

Geoffrey Potts (1947 – 28 October 2017) was a British lightweight rower.

He was educated at Durham School, where he competed for the Durham School Boat Club. He rowed with Durham University Boat Club from 1968 to 1970 and later earned a postgraduate degree in Management from Durham University in 1975.

== Rowing career ==
Potts rowed for Great Britain in the lightweight single sculls at the 1974 World Rowing Championships in Lucerne, he finished 4th overall, missing out on a medal in a photo finish.

He won a silver medal at the 1972 British Rowing Championships when rowing for the Durham Amateur Rowing Club.

Potts died suddenly from a cardiac arrest during a coaching session on 28 October 2017. He had received a pacemaker as a young man due to a heart condition.
