= Kenji Kaneyasu =

Japanese rower (born 1954)

Personal information
- Nationality: Japanese
- Born: 18 October 1954 (age 70)

Sport
- Sport: Rowing

Kenji Kaneyasu (金康 健司, Kaneyasu Kenji, born 18 October 1954) is a Japanese rower. He competed in the men's eight event at the 1976 Summer Olympics.
