= Masanobu Yamamoto =

Japanese inventor, optical engineer, business executive and olympic rower

Personal information
- Nationality: Japanese
- Born: 27 June 1949 (age 77)
- Education: University of Tokyo
- Occupation: Optical engineer
- Employers: Sony Corp., Sony DADC, Phototek Laboratory Inc, Miftek

Sport
- Sport: Rowing

Masanobu Yamamoto (山本 真伸, Yamamoto Masanobu; born 27 June 1949) is a Japanese optical engineer, inventor, business executive, and rower who competed in the Olympics.

After graduating with a Bachelor of Science in physics from the University of Tokyo in 1973, Yamamoto began his career as an optical engineer for Sony Corp, where he spent nearly 35 years developing optical storage and display systems. From 1973 to 2010, he was a General Manager at Sony. He has contributed to the evolution of optical recording technology. In 1979, he joined the joint Sony-Philips' CD co-development team, where he was in charge of the CD media and physical specifications. Since 1996, he has led the development of a new recording technology based on lasers with shorter wavelengths and optics with greater numerical apertures. This initiative resulted in the creation of the first Blu-ray disc recorder in 2003 and a BD-ROM player such as the PS3 in 2006.

Between 2010 and 2012, Yamamoto served as the Chief Technical Communications Adviser for Sony Corporation of America. From October 2012 to May 2014, he served as a Vice-President for Bioscience Technologies and Business Development at Sony DADC Bioscience, where he was responsible for developing the first commercial spectral flow cytometry system utilizing Purdue's spectral technology. Since 2012 Yamamoto has served as the business development manager for microfluidics Phototek Laboratory Inc. in Kanagawa, Japan.

After retirement from Sony DADC, Yamamoto relocated to West Lafayette, IN, where, in a partnership with J. Paul Robinson, he co-founded Miftek Corporation and continues his work on the expansion of the Blu-ray-related technologies, and the new photon-detection systems for biological applications. He is also an adjunct professor at Purdue University, West Lafayette, Indiana.

In 2012 Yamamoto was admitted to the American Institute for Medical and Biological Engineering (AIMBE) College of Fellows for "outstanding contributions to advanced detection technologies and for his seminal contribution to the design, advancement and manufacture of microfluidic devices."

On Dec 12, 2023 Yamamoto was have been named a fellow of the National Academy of Inventors (NAI).

Yamamoto is a rower. He competed in the men's eight event at the 1976 Summer Olympics.
