= Aleksandr Plyushkin =

Soviet rower

Personal information
- Nationality: Russian
- Born: 20 May 1948 (age 76); Kazan, Russian SFSR, Soviet Union

Sport
- Sport: Rowing

Aleksandr Plyushkin (born 20 May 1948) is a Russian rower. He competed in the men's eight event at the 1976 Summer Olympics.
