= Josef Pokorný =

Czech rower

Personal information
- Nationality: Czech
- Born: 28 December 1955 (age 69); Prague, Czechoslovakia

Sport
- Sport: Rowing

Josef Pokorný (born 28 December 1955) is a Czech rower. He competed in the men's eight event at the 1976 Summer Olympics.
