= Akio Kakishita =

Japanese rower (born 1953)

Personal information
- Nationality: Japanese
- Born: 10 October 1953 (age 71)

Sport
- Sport: Rowing

Akio Kakishita (柿下 秋男, Kakishita Akio, born 10 October 1953) is a Japanese rower. He competed in the men's eight event at the 1976 Summer Olympics.
