= The Boat Race 1972 =

118th Boat Race
- Date: 1 April 1972
- Winner: Cambridge
- Margin of victory: 9 1/2 lengths
- Winning time: 18 minutes 36 seconds
- Overall record (Cambridge–Oxford): 66–51
- Umpire: P. N. Carpmael (Cambridge)

Other races
- Reserve winner: Goldie
- Women's winner: Cambridge

The 118th Boat Race took place on 1 April 1972. Held annually, the Boat Race is a side-by-side rowing race between crews from the Universities of Oxford and Cambridge along a 4.2-mile (6.8 km) tidal stretch of the River Thames in south-west London. Umpired by former Cambridge rower Philip Carpmael, the race was won by Cambridge, who passed the finishing post 9 1/2 lengths ahead of Oxford in a time of 18 minutes and 36 seconds, their fifth consecutive victory. The win took the overall record since 1829 to 66–51 in favour of Cambridge.

The race was variously described as an "anti-climax" and "a bore" given the ease with which Cambridge secured the win. Their crew was the heaviest in Boat Race history and included siblings for the first time since 1935. In the reserve race, Cambridge's Goldie beat Oxford's Isis, and in the Women's Boat Race, Cambridge were victorious.

== Background ==
The Boat Race is a side-by-side rowing competition between the University of Oxford (sometimes referred to as the "Dark Blues") and the University of Cambridge (sometimes referred to as the "Light Blues"). First held in 1829, the race takes place on the 4.2-mile (6.8 km) Championship Course on the River Thames in southwest London. The rivalry is a major point of honour between the two universities; it is followed throughout the United Kingdom and broadcast worldwide. Cambridge went into the race as reigning champions, having beaten Oxford by ten lengths in the previous year's race. Cambridge also held the overall lead with 65 victories to Oxford's 51 (excluding the "dead heat" of 1877).

The first Women's Boat Race took place in 1927, but did not become an annual fixture until the 1960s. Up until 2014, the contest was conducted as part of the Henley Boat Races, but as of the 2015 race, it is held on the River Thames, on the same day as the men's main and reserve races. The reserve race, contested between Oxford's Isis boat and Cambridge's Goldie boat has been held since 1965. It usually takes place on the Tideway, prior to the main Boat Race.

Oxford were coached by Dick Fishlock who had coxed Great Britain in the men's eight in the 1960 Summer Olympics. He was assisted by John Langfield, John Peake, Peter Reynolds (who had coxed for the Dark Blues in the 1960 and 1961 races) and Peter Sutherland. Cambridge were being coached by Lou Barry for the fifth consecutive year, along with James Crowden (who had rowed for the Light Blues in the 1951 and 1952 races), David Jennens (who had represented the Cantabrigians three times between 1949 and the 1951 race, Donald Legget (who rowed in the 1963 and 1964 races, Mike Sweeney (who rowed in the 1965 and 1966 races) and Robin Winckless (who rowed in the 1967, 1968 and 1969 races). The umpire for the race was Philip Carpmael who had rowed for Cambridge in the 1930 and 1931 races.

Writing in The Times, Jim Railton suggested that Cambridge looked "invincible" before their arrival at the Thames, and former Oxford Blue and author Dickie Burnell suggested that the Light Blues were "reckoned to be unbeatable". However, Oxford rowed a number of record practice times, while Cambridge met with several "disasters" (including catching some "mammoth crabs" and experiencing outings "spoilt by shipwrecks").

== Crews ==
The Cambridge crew weighed 8.5 pounds (3.9 kg) per rower more than their opponents, averaging just over 13 st 11 lb (75.6 kg), making them the heaviest crew in the history of the race. Both boats contained four Blues; Oxford saw Keith Bolshaw, D. d'A Willis, Andrew Hall and J. Hawkesley return, while Cambridge's crew included Chris Baillieu (whose grandfather had rowed in the 1913 race), Neil James, David Maxwell and Graham Hughes. American Olympic rower Gardiner Cadwalader (who finished fifth in the men's coxed four in the 1968 Summer Olympics in Mexico) along with four British Olympic team candidates (Maxwell, Bailieu, Michael Hart and James) brought experience to the Light Blue boat. Cambridge's crew also contained brothers Michael and James Hart, the first time a pair of siblings had rowed for Cambridge since the Kingsfords in the 1935 race. Along with Cadwalader, Oxford cox Fred Yalouris was American, while the Dark Blue bow Michael Magarey was Australian; all the other participants were British.

Seat	Oxford			Cambridge		
Seat	Name	College	Weight	Name	College	Weight
Bow	M. A. Magerery	Magdalen	13 st 8 lb	R. J. S. Clarke	St Catharine's	13 st 1 lb
2	K. Bolshaw	Christ Church	12 st 11 lb	C. L. Baillieu	Jesus	13 st 13 lb
3	D. R. d'A Willis	St Peter's	14 st 12 lb	S. G. I. Kerruish	Fitzwilliam	12 st 10 lb
4	A. J. Hall (P)	Keble	15 st 3 lb	J. A. Hart	Fitzwilliam	13 st 5 lb
5	D. R. Payne	Balliol	12 st 10 lb	N. W. James	Jesus	14 st 0 lb
6	J. P. W. Hawksley	Balliol	12 st 12 lb	G. A. Cadwalader	Lady Margaret Boat Club	14 st 10 lb
7	Hon. P. D. E. M. Moncreiffe	Christ Church	11 st 6 lb	M. J. Hart	Peterhouse	14 st 2 lb
Stroke	M. G. C. T. Baines	Keble	12 st 3 lb	D. L. Maxwell	Jesus	14 st 6 lb
Cox	E. Yalouris	Merton	8 st 12 lb	N. G. Hughes (P)	Queens'	9 st 1 lb
Source: (P) – Boat club president

== Race ==
The Championship Course along which the Boat Race is contested

Cambridge were pre-race favourites. Oxford won the toss and elected to start from the Surrey station, from which the previous ten winning crews had commenced, handing the Middlesex side of the river to the Light Blues. At the scheduled start time of 3:15 p.m., Cambridge were still practising downstream and hence the event was delayed. Fishlock remarked that he believed this to be "plain bad manners". Within a minute of the start, Cambridge held a lead of a canvas length and despite reducing their stroke rate, they continued to pull away from Oxford. At the Mile Post, the lead was seven seconds, and at Hammersmith Bridge the Light Blues held a lead of three lengths; they extended this to 21 seconds by Chiswick Steps, and 24 seconds by Barnes Bridge. By the finishing post, Cambridge were 34 seconds ahead, recording a 9 1/2-length victory in a time of 18 minutes 36 seconds. Oxford's stroke, Mike Baines, collapsed at the end of the race. Railton wrote that "the race was once again an anti-climax, painful to watch, with a merciful release as Oxford crawled past the timber post marking the race finish." The Guardian report Mike Rodda described the race as "a bore".

In the tenth edition of the reserve race, Cambridge's Goldie beat Oxford's Isis by 2 1/2 lengths in a time of 19 minutes and 19 seconds, their sixth consecutive victory which made the overall record 6–2. In the 27th running of the Women's Boat Race, Cambridge triumphed, their tenth consecutive victory, and their fifteenth in eighteen years taking the overall record to 17–10 in their favour.
