= Israel Gorguet =

Cuban rower

Personal information
- Nationality: Cuban
- Born: 5 February 1949 (age 76)

Sport
- Sport: Rowing

Israel Gorguet (born 5 February 1949) is a Cuban rower. He competed in the men's eight event at the 1976 Summer Olympics.
