= Volker Sauer =

German rower

Personal information
- Nationality: German
- Born: 1 April 1956 (age 68); Essen, Germany

Sport
- Sport: Rowing

Volker Sauer (born 1 April 1956) is a German rower. He competed in the men's eight event at the 1976 Summer Olympics.
