= Patrick Croskerry =

Canadian psychologist and rower (born 1942)

Patrick Croskerry CM
- Born: 7 October 1942 (age 84); Dover, England
- Citizenship: Canadian

Academic background
- Education: University of Aberdeen; McMaster University

Academic work
- Institutions: Dalhousie University
- Sports career
- Sport: Rowing

Patrick George Croskerry (born 7 October 1942) is a British-Canadian clinical psychologist and former rower. He is the Director of the Critical Thinking Program within the Division of Medical Education, Dalhousie University. He competed in the men's eight event at the 1976 Summer Olympics.

== Education ==
Croskerry was born in Dover, England. From 1953 to 1960, he attended Dover Grammar School for Boys. Croskerry subsequently studied at the University of Aberdeen where he obtained his B.Sc., before gaining a Ph.D. in psychology from McMaster University in Canada and an M.D. at the same university in 1982.

== Rowing career ==
Croskerry learnt to row in Deal. In Aberdeen, he competed at the Scottish trials and in a representative Scottish eight. In Canada, Croskerry joined the Leander rowing club in Hamilton. He competed at the Royal Canadian Henley Regatta in 1974 which led to subsequent selection for the Canadian national rowing squad and participation in the 1975 World Championships. In 1976, Croskerry's final international representation was at the 1976 Summer Olympic Games in the Canadian men's eight.

== Academic career ==
Trained as an experimental psychologist, Croskerry now has an international reputation in Emergency Medicine, Patient Health and Safety, and medical decision making, including cognitive bias.

He was made a Member of the Order of Canada on December 31, 2025.
