= Werner Klatt =

East German rower (1948–2022)

Personal information
- Born: 21 December 1948 Schöneberg, West Berlin, Allied-occupied Germany
- Died: 3 April 2022 (aged 73)
- Height: 190 cm (6 ft 3 in)
- Weight: 98 kg (216 lb)

Sport
- Sport: Rowing
Medal record
Men's rowing
Representing East Germany
Olympic Games
Gold medal – first place	1976 Montreal	Eight
World Rowing Championships
Gold medal – first place	1970 St. Catharines	Coxless pair
Gold medal – first place	1975 Nottingham	Eight
European Rowing Championships
Bronze medal – third place	1969 Klagenfurt	Coxless four
Gold medal – first place	1971 Copenhagen	Coxless pair
Gold medal – first place	1973 Moscow	Eight

Werner Klatt (21 December 1948 – 3 April 2022) was a German rower who competed for East Germany in the 1976 Summer Olympics. He was born in Schöneberg. In 1976, he was a crew member of the East German boat, which won the gold medal in the eight event.
