= Humberto Dorrego =

Cuban rower (born 1952)

Personal information
- Full name: Humberto Dorrego González
- Nationality: Cuban
- Born: 26 September 1952 (age 73)

Sport
- Sport: Rowing
Medal record
Men's rowing
Representing Cuba
Pan American Games
Silver medal – second place	1975 Mexico City	Coxed four
Silver medal – second place	1975 Mexico City	Eight
Bronze medal – third place	1979 San Juan	Eight

Humberto Dorrego González (born 26 September 1952) is a Cuban rower. He competed in the men's eight event at the 1976 Summer Olympics.
