= Wolf-Dieter Oschlies =

German rower

Personal information
- Nationality: German
- Born: 19 February 1953; Hildesheim, Germany
- Died: 28 May 2016 (aged 63); Springe, Germany

Sport
- Sport: Rowing

Wolf-Dieter Oschlies (19 February 1953 – 28 May 2016) was a German rower. He competed in the men's eight event at the 1976 Summer Olympics.
