= Porfirio Reynoso =

Cuban rower

Personal information
- Nationality: Cuban
- Born: 4 May 1950 (age 75)

Sport
- Sport: Rowing

Porfirio Reynoso (born 4 May 1950) is a Cuban rower. He competed in the men's eight event at the 1976 Summer Olympics.
