= Vladimir Vasilyev (rower) =

Soviet rower

Personal information
- Native name: Владимир Михайлович Васильев
- Full name: Vladimir Mikhailovich Vasilyev
- Nationality: Russian
- Born: 21 January 1948 (age 78) Moscow, Russian SFSR, Soviet Union

Sport
- Sport: Rowing

Vladimir Mikhailovich Vasilyev (Russian: Владимир Михайлович Васильев; born 21 January 1948) is a Russian rower. He competed in the men's eight event at the 1976 Summer Olympics. Vasilyev was position number 7 in their rowing team.
