= Latz =

Latz is a German surname, which is derived from the Slavic given name Ladislaw, a variant of László. The name may refer to:

- Bob Latz (1930-2022), American politician
- Grace Latz (born 1988), American rower
- Helmut Latz (born 1955), German rower
- Irmgard Latz (born 1939), German badminton player
- Jake Latz (born 1996), American baseball player
- Jean-Pierre Latz (1691–1754), German cabinetmaker
- Peter Latz (landscape architect) (born 1939), German landscape architect
- Peter Latz (botanist) (born 1941), Central Australian botanist
- Ron Latz (born 1963), American politician
- Tallan Noble Latz (born 1999), American musician

== See also ==
- Latzke
