= Ron Burak =

Canadian rower (born 1953)

Personal information
- Nickname: Swede
- Born: June 30, 1953 (age 72); Kirkland Lake, Ontario, Canada

Sport
- Sport: Rowing

Ron "Swede" Burak (born June 30, 1953) is a Canadian rower and coach. He competed in the men's eight event at the 1976 Summer Olympics. Burak also coached for the Brock University Badgers women's rowing team and was named Rowing Canada's male coach of the year in 2012.
