= Václav Mls =

Czech rower

Personal information
- Nationality: Czech
- Born: 17 July 1949 (age 75); Prague, Czechoslovakia

Sport
- Sport: Rowing

Václav Mls (born 17 July 1949) is a Czech rower. He competed in the men's eight event at the 1976 Summer Olympics.
