= Vladimir Zharov =

Soviet rower

Personal information
- Nationality: Russian
- Born: 14 July 1949; Kolomna, Russian SFSR, Soviet Union
- Died: 2002 (aged 52–53)

Sport
- Sport: Rowing

Vladimir Zharov (14 July 1949 – 2002) was a Russian rower. He competed in the men's eight event at the 1976 Summer Olympics.
