= Vasily Potapov =

Russian rower

Personal information
- Nationality: Russian
- Born: 4 March 1955 (age 70); Shemelka, Russian SFSR, Soviet Union

Sport
- Sport: Rowing

Vasily Potapov (born 4 March 1955) is a Russian rower. He competed in the men's eight event at the 1976 Summer Olympics.
