= Latzke =

Latzke is a German surname, which is derived from the Slavic given name Ladislaw, a variant of László.

The name may refer to:

- Felix Latzke (born 1942), Austrian footballer and manager
- Rainer Maria Latzke (born 1950), German artist

== See also ==
- Latz
