= Luis Alonso =

Cuban rower

Personal information
- Full name: Luis Armando Alonso Gómez
- Nationality: Cuban
- Born: 19 August 1951 (age 74)

Sport
- Sport: Rowing
Medal record
Men's rowing
Representing Cuba
Pan American Games
Silver medal – second place	1975 Mexico City	Coxed four
Silver medal – second place	1975 Mexico City	Eight

Luis Armando Alonso Gómez (born 19 August 1951) is a Cuban rower. He competed in the men's eight event at the 1976 Summer Olympics.
