= Mark Norelius =

American rower

Personal information
- Nationality: American
- Born: June 10, 1952 (age 74) Seattle, Washington, United States

Sport
- Sport: Rowing

Mark Norelius (born June 10, 1952) is an American former rower. He rowed at the University of Washington. He competed in the men's eight event at the 1976 Summer Olympics.
