= Otmar Kaufhold =

German rower

Personal information
- Nationality: German
- Born: 28 June 1952; Bremen, Germany
- Died: 3 February 2001 (aged 48); Hanover, Germany

Sport
- Sport: Rowing

Otmar Kaufhold (28 June 1952 – 3 February 2001) was a German rower. He competed in the men's eight event at the 1976 Summer Olympics.
