= Alcides Risco =

Cuban rower

Personal information
- Full name: Alcides Risco Batista
- Nationality: Cuban
- Born: 29 November 1953 (age 72)

Sport
- Sport: Rowing
Medal record
Men's rowing
Representing Cuba
Pan American Games
Silver medal – second place	1975 Mexico City	Coxed four
Silver medal – second place	1975 Mexico City	Eight
Bronze medal – third place	1979 San Juan	Eight

Alcides Risco Batista (Note: In this Spanish name, the first or paternal surname is Risco and the second or maternal family name is Batista.) (born 29 November 1953) is a Cuban rower. He competed in the men's eight event at the 1976 Summer Olympics.
