= Steve Christiansen (rower) =

American rower (born 1956)

Personal information
- Nationality: American
- Born: November 10, 1956 (age 69) Perth Amboy, New Jersey, U.S.

Sport
- Sport: Rowing
Medal record
Men's rowing
Representing United States
Pan American Games
Bronze medal – third place	1979 San Juan	Coxed four

Steve Christiansen (born November 10, 1956) is an American rower. He competed in the men's eight event at the 1976 Summer Olympics.

Although he trained with the same team to be part of the 1980 Summer Olympics, a boycott thereof prevented their entry into the competition. During training sessions he was sometimes the brunt of jokes and was jokingly referred to by the nickname Chiclets.

== Early life and education ==
Born in Perth Amboy, New Jersey, Christiansen started rowing while at Rutgers. He later enrolled at the University of Pennsylvania where he was the captain of the heavyweight rowing team.
