= Athol MacDonald =

Australian rower

Athol Macdonald
Personal information
- Nationality: Australian
- Born: 3 September 1953 (age 71)

Sport
- Sport: Rowing
- Club: Adelaide Rowing Club; Sydney Rowing Club

Achievements and titles
- Olympic finals: Montreal 1976 M8+
- National finals: King's Cup Sth Aust 1973–75; King's Cup NSW 1976–79; Aust Champion 1975 M4+ Aust Champion 1981 M2+

Athol Macdonald (born 3 September 1953) is an Australian former representative rower. He was a four-time national champion who competed at World Championships and in the men's eight event at the 1976 Summer Olympics.

== Club and state rowing ==
Raised in South Australia, Macdonald's senior rowing was from the Adelaide Rowing Club where his younger brother Chester was also a successful senior rower. Athol first made state selection for South Australia in 1973 in the men's eight which contested the King's Cup at the Interstate Regatta. He rowed in two further South Australian King's Cup eights in 1974 and 1975 stroking the 1975 crew to a second place.

By 1976 Macdonald had relocated to Sydney and was rowing from the Mosman Rowing Club. He made state selection for New South Wales in 1976 in the four seat of the men's eight which contested and won the King's Cup at the Interstate Regatta within the Australian Rowing Championships. He rowed in another King's Cup winning New South Wales crew in 1978 and then in the New South Wales eights of 1979.

At the 1975 Australian Championships Macdonald rowed in Adelaide colours in a composite South Australian four which contested and won the coxed four national title. The 1976 Australian Rowing Championships saw an open men's eight event contested (distinct from the King's Cup) and MacDonald rowed in an all-Mosman crew to win that title. In 1981 with Sydney's John Sivewright and coxed by Stephen Dadour, Macdonald won the national coxed pair title at the Australian Rowing Championships.

== International representative rowing ==
MacDonald made his Australian representative debut at the 1976 Montreal Olympics. The Australian men's eight for the Montreal was mostly that year's King's Cup winning New South Wales crew excepting Malcolm Shaw in the two seat and Brian Richardson at bow. With Macdonald rowing at three they commenced their Olympic campaign with a heat win in a new world record time and progressed to the final. In the heat Shaw suffered a collapsed vertebra which saw him out of the eight and replaced by Peter Shakespear, the reserve. In the final the Australians finished fifth.

MacDonald was out of the eight for the 1977 World Rowing Championships but for the 1978 Championships in Lake Karapiro, the successful New South Wales King's Cup eight was again selected and was composed of all Sydney Rowing Club men excepting MacDonald and his Mosman club-mate Gary Uebergang. The Australian eight placed second in their heat, third in the repechage and in the final finished fourth being edged out for third by the host nation New Zealand.
