= Tomiaki Iso =

Japanese rower (born 1954)

Personal information
- Nationality: Japanese
- Born: 20 April 1954 (age 71)

Sport
- Sport: Rowing

Tomiaki Iso (礒 富昭, Iso Tomiaki, born 20 April 1954) is a Japanese rower. He competed in the men's eight event at the 1976 Summer Olympics.
