= Hiroshi Toriba =

Japanese rower (born 1950)

Personal information
- Nationality: Japanese
- Born: 23 November 1950 (age 74)

Sport
- Sport: Rowing

Hiroshi Toriba (鳥羽 博司, Toriba Hiroshi, born 23 November 1950) is a Japanese rower. He competed in the men's eight event at the 1976 Summer Olympics.
