= Robert Choquette (rowing) =

Canadian rower (born 1954)

Personal information
- Born: November 25, 1954 (age 70); St. Catharines, Ontario, Canada

Sport
- Sport: Rowing

Robert Choquette (born November 25, 1954) is a Canadian rower. He competed in the men's eight event at the 1976 Summer Olympics.
