= Shiro Mataki =

Japanese rower (born 1953)

Personal information
- Nationality: Japanese
- Born: 12 February 1953 (age 72)

Sport
- Sport: Rowing

Shiro Mataki (俣木 志朗, Mataki Shirō, born 12 February 1953) is a Japanese rower. He competed in the men's eight event at the 1976 Summer Olympics.
