= Takashi Murayama =

Japanese rower (born 1951)

Personal information
- Nationality: Japanese
- Born: 20 March 1951 (age 74)

Sport
- Sport: Rowing

Takashi Murayama (村山 隆志, Murayama Takashi, born 20 March 1951) is a Japanese rower. He competed in the men's eight event at the 1976 Summer Olympics.
