= Antanas Čikotas =

Lithuanian rower (1951–2021)

Personal information
- Nationality: Lithuanian
- Born: 2 June 1951 Veiveriai, Lithuanian SSR, USSR
- Died: 7 May 2021 (aged 69) Kaunas, Lithuania

Sport
- Sport: Rowing

Antanas Čikotas (2 June 1951 – 7 May 2021) was a Lithuanian rower. He competed in the men's eight event at the 1976 Summer Olympics.
