= James Hervey-Bathurst =

British businessman and landowner (born 1949)

James Felton Somers Hervey-Bathurst CBE DL (born 8 December 1949) is a British businessman and landowner.

== Biography ==
Hervey-Bathurst is the son of Major Benjamin Hervey-Bathurst OBE and Hon. Elizabeth Somers Cocks, the only daughter and heiress of Arthur Somers Cocks, 6th Baron Somers. He was educated at Eton College and Trinity College, Cambridge. He rowed in the 1970 & 1971 Boat Race for Cambridge University.

Through his mother, Hervey-Bathurst inherited Eastnor Castle and estate in 1988.

He has subsequently been closely involved in historic architecture and cultural heritage preservation in Britain. Since 2006 he has been vice-president of European Historic Houses. Between 2009 and 2013 he was a chairman of the World Monuments Fund (UK). He was president of the Historic Houses Association from 2004 to 2008. He also worked as a consultant in heritage and taxation for Christie's. In 2009 he was invested as a Commander of the Order of the British Empire in recognition of services to national heritage. In 2008 he was appointed a Deputy Lieutenant of Herefordshire and in July 2019 he was appointed High Sheriff of Herefordshire for a one year term.

As of 2020, he was listed as Chairman of the Heritage Fuels Alliance, a Trustee of Longleat International and a Trustee of Bathurst Estate Holdings. He was also a Director of Eastnor Castle Estates Company which was formed in 1940.

=== Marriages and family ===
He married, firstly, Hon. Sarah Peake, a daughter of Martin Peake, 2nd Viscount Ingleby, on 25 September 1982. They had three daughters but separated in 2002. He married, secondly, Lucy Manners, with whom he has had two daughters.
