= Frank Schütze =

German rower

Personal information
- Nationality: German
- Born: 2 July 1956 (age 68); Uelzen, Germany

Sport
- Sport: Rowing

Frank Schütze (born 2 July 1956) is a German rower. He competed in the men's eight event at the 1976 Summer Olympics.
