= Anatoly Ivanov (rower) =

Russian rower

Personal information
- Full name: Anatoly Yevgenyevich Ivanov
- Nationality: Russian
- Born: 8 January 1950 (age 75); Leningrad, Russian SFSR, Soviet Union

Sport
- Sport: Rowing

Anatoly Ivanov (born 8 January 1950) is a Russian rower. He competed in the men's eight event at the 1976 Summer Olympics.
