= John Everett (rower) =

American rower (born 1954)

Personal information
- Born: September 10, 1954 (age 71) Salem, Massachusetts, United States

Sport
- Sport: Rowing

John Everett (born September 10, 1954) is an American rower. He rowed at MIT and graduated from there in 1976. He competed in the men's eight event at the 1976 Summer Olympics.
