= Roland Kostulski =

East German rower

Personal information
- Born: 13 June 1953 (age 73) Borna, East Germany
- Height: 192 cm (6 ft 4 in)
- Weight: 82 kg (181 lb)

Sport
- Sport: Rowing
Medal record
Men's rowing
Representing East Germany
Olympic Games
Gold medal – first place	1976 Montreal	Eight
World Rowing Championships
Gold medal – first place	1975 Nottingham	Eight

Roland Kostulski (born 13 June 1953) is a German rower who competed for East Germany in the 1976 Summer Olympics.

He was born in Borna, Saxony. In 1976, he was a crew member of the East German boat, which won the gold medal in the eight event.
