= Bernd Baumgart =

German rower

Personal information
- Born: 3 July 1955 (age 70) Wittenberg, East Germany
Medal record
Men's rowing
Representing East Germany
Olympic Games
Gold medal – first place	1976 Montreal	Eight

Bernd Baumgart (born 3 July 1955) is a German rower who competed for East Germany in the 1976 Summer Olympics.

He was born in Wittenberg. In 1976, he was a crew member of the East German boat, which won the gold medal in the men's eight event.
