= Hans-Joachim Lück =

East German rower

Personal information
- Born: 22 June 1953 (age 73) Stralsund, East Germany
- Height: 191 cm (6 ft 3 in)
- Weight: 88 kg (194 lb)

Sport
- Sport: Rowing
- Club: ASK Vorwärts Rostock
Medal record
Men's rowing
Representing East Germany
Olympic Games
Gold medal – first place	1976 Montreal	Eight
World Rowing Championships
Gold medal – first place	1977 Amsterdam	Eight

Hans-Joachim Lück (born 22 June 1953) is a German rower who competed for East Germany in the 1976 Summer Olympics.

He was born in Stralsund. In 1976 he was a crew member of the East German boat which won the gold medal in the eight event.
