= Michael Hart (rower) =

British rower (born 1951)

Mike Hart
Personal information
- Full name: Michael John Hart
- Nationality: British
- Born: 24 October 1951 (age 74)
- Education: Peterhouse, Cambridge

Sport
- Country: Great Britain
- Sport: Rowing
- Event: Coxed pairs/ Double sculls
- Club: Leander Club
Medal record
Men's rowing
Representing Great Britain
Olympic Games
Silver medal – second place	1976 Montreal	Double sculls
World Rowing Championships
Bronze medal – third place	1974 Lucerne	Double sculls
Bronze medal – third place	1975 Nottingham	Double sculls
Gold medal – first place	1977 Amsterdam	Double sculls
European Rowing Championships
Bronze medal – third place	1973 Moscow	Double sculls

Michael John Hart MBE (born 24 October 1951) is a British former rower who competed in the 1972 Summer Olympics and in the 1976 Summer Olympics.

== Rowing career ==
Hart attended Peterhouse, Cambridge, and rowed in the winning Cambridge boat in the Boat Races in the 1972 and 1973 races, stroking the boat in 1973.

In 1972, he partnered David Maxwell to finish eighth rowing at the 1972 Summer Olympics in the coxed pairs event. In 1973 he teamed up with Chris Baillieu in the double scull to win the Double Sculls Challenge Cup at Henley Royal Regatta. Rowing for Leander Club, they won the event again in 1975 and in between he participated in the 1974 World Rowing Championships in Lucerne, competing in the double sculls event with Bailleau, which resulted in winning a bronze medal. He was part of the double scull that won a bronze medal at the 1975 World Rowing Championships in Nottingham.

In the 1976 Summer Olympics Hart and Baillieu won a silver medal for double sculls and the same pair won a gold medal at the World Championships the following year. They won the Double Sculls Challenge Cup at Henley again in 1977 and 1978. He was awarded an MBE in the 1977 Silver Jubilee and Birthday Honours.

Nationally he won the 1974 British Rowing Championships and 1975 British Rowing Championships double sculls for Leander with Chris Baillieu. He had won the coxed pairs at the inaugural National Championships in 1972 with David Maxwell and Alan Inns, and their record time still stands as of 2020. Hart is an active member of Dittons Skiff and Punting Club and has won various punting championships and participated in several record breaking challenges.

== Personal life ==
He married fellow national champion rower Pauline Bird-Hart in late 1976. He later married Valerie Winckless, the mother of Olympic rowing medallist Sarah Winckless.

== See also ==
- List of Cambridge University Boat Race crews
