= Toshihai Kitaura =

Japanese rower (born 1952)

Personal information
- Nationality: Japanese
- Born: 5 January 1952 (age 73)

Sport
- Sport: Rowing

Toshihai Kitaura (北浦 俊治, Kitaura Toshihai, born 5 January 1952) is a Japanese rower. He competed in the men's eight event at the 1976 Summer Olympics.
