= Michael Hess (rower) =

American rower

Personal information
- Full name: Michael Joseph Hess
- Nationality: American
- Born: May 17, 1955 (age 71) Chillicothe, Ohio, United States

Sport
- Sport: Rowing

Michael Hess (born May 17, 1955) is an American rower. He competed in the men's eight event at the 1976 Summer Olympics.
