= Gary Uebergang =

Australian rower

Garry Uebergang
Personal information
- Nationality: Australian
- Born: 3 February 1951 (age 74)

Sport
- Sport: Rowing
- Club: Mosman Rowing Club

Achievements and titles
- Olympic finals: Montreal 1976 M8+
- National finals: King's Cup 1972-1976

Garry Uebergang (born 3 February 1951) is an Australian former rower. He was a three-time national champion and competed in the men's eight event at the 1976 Summer Olympics.

== Club and state rowing ==
Raised in Queensland, he studied an arts degree at the University of Queensland and rowed in the university's men's eight at the 1971 Australian Intervarsity Championships. He first made state selection for Queensland in the men's senior eight which contested the 1972 King's Cup at the Interstate Regatta. He rowed again for Queensland in the 1973 King's Cup.

In Sydney Uebergang rowed from the Mosman Rowing Club. The 1976 Australian Rowing Championships saw an open men's eight event contested (distinct from the King's Cup) and Uebergang rowed in an all-Mosman crew which won that title. For the 1977 Australian Championships the New South Wales King's Cup crew split down and contested the coxed four national title in two boats. Uebergang wore Mosman colours and his crew placed fourth in that event.

He made senior state selection for New South Wales in 1976 in the men's eight which contested and won the King's Cup at the Interstate Regatta. In 1977 he was a reserve and in 1978 he was again in the five seat of the New South Wales's King's Cup winning eight.

== International representative rowing ==
The Australian men's eight for the 1976 Montreal Olympics was mostly that year's King's Cup winning New South Wales crew excepting Malcolm Shaw in the two seat and Brian Richardson at bow. With Uebergang rowing at four they commenced their Olympic campaign with a heat win in a new world record time and progressed to the final. In the heat Shaw suffered a severe back injury (a collapsed vertebra) which saw him out of the eight and replaced by Peter Shakespear, the reserve. In the final the Australians finished fifth.

For the 1978 World Rowing Championships in Lake Karapiro, the successful New South Wales King's Cup eight was again selected and was composed of all Sydney men excepting Uebergang who rowed at five and Athol MacDonald also from Mosman. The Australian eight placed second in their heat, third in the repechage and in the final finished fourth being edged out for third by the host nation New Zealand.

== Coaching and teacher ==
At Sydney's Shore School Uebergang was a rowing master, and coached the 1985 Shore 1st VIII to victory in the schoolboy eight title at that year's Australian Rowing Championships. He was chosen as coach of the 1989 New South Wales youth eight to contest the Noel Wilkinson Trophy at the Interstate Regatta although that year's racing was cancelled due to cyclone conditions.
