= Alexander Manson (rower) =

Canadian rower

Personal information
- Nationality: Canadian
- Born: 20 May 1953 (age 71); Vancouver, British Columbia, Canada

Sport
- Sport: Rowing

Alexander Manson (born 20 May 1953) is a Canadian rower. He competed in the men's eight event at the 1976 Summer Olympics.
