= Kitaura Station =

Kitaura Station is the name of two train stations in Japan.

- Kitaura Station (Miyagi), in Miyagi Prefecture on the East Rikuu Line.
- Kitaura Station (Kōchi), in Kōchi Prefecture on the Tosa Dentetsu Gomen Line
