= Wolfram Thiem =

German rower

Personal information
- Nationality: German
- Born: 12 June 1956; Hemmingen, Germany
- Died: 22 July 2011 (aged 55); Hanover, Germany

Sport
- Sport: Rowing

Wolfram Thiem (12 June 1956 – 22 July 2011) was a German rower. He competed at the 1976 Summer Olympics and the 1984 Summer Olympics.
