= The Boat Race 1971 =

117th Boat Race
- Date: 27 March 1971
- Winner: Cambridge
- Margin of victory: 10 lengths
- Winning time: 17 minutes 58 seconds
- Overall record (Cambridge–Oxford): 65–51
- Umpire: C. G. V. Davidge (Oxford)

Other races
- Reserve winner: Goldie
- Women's winner: Cambridge

The 117th Boat Race took place on 27 March 1971. Held annually, it is a side-by-side rowing race between crews from the Universities of Oxford and Cambridge along the River Thames. It was won by Cambridge who passed the finishing post ten lengths ahead of Oxford, securing Cambridge's fourth consecutive victory. The winning time was, at that point, the second fastest in the history of the event.

In the reserve race, Goldie beat Isis, and in the Women's Boat Race, Cambridge were victorious.

== Background ==
The Boat Race is a side-by-side rowing competition between the University of Oxford (sometimes referred to as the "Dark Blues") and the University of Cambridge (sometimes referred to as the "Light Blues"). The race was first held in 1829, and since 1845 has taken place on the 4.2-mile (6.8 km) Championship Course on the River Thames in southwest London. The rivalry is a major point of honour between the two universities, followed throughout the United Kingdom and broadcast worldwide. Cambridge went into the race as reigning champions, having beaten Oxford by 3 1/2 lengths in the previous year's race, and held the overall lead, with 64 victories to Oxford's 51 (excluding the "dead heat" of 1877).

The first Women's Boat Race took place in 1927, but did not become an annual fixture until the 1960s. Until 2014, the contest was conducted as part of the Henley Boat Races, but as of the 2015 race, it is held on the River Thames, on the same day as the men's main and reserve races. The reserve race, contested between Oxford's Isis boat and Cambridge's Goldie boat has been held since 1965. It usually takes place on the Tideway, prior to the main Boat Race.

Cambridge coach Lou Barry was aiming to lead the Light Blues to victory for the fourth consecutive time under his guidance, while Oxford were coached by their former Blue, Ronnie Howard, who represented the university in the 1957 and 1959 races. The race was umpired by the former Oxford and Olympic rower Christopher Davidge who had represented the Dark Blues in the 1949, 1951 and 1952 races.

== Crews ==
The Oxford crew weighed an average of 13 st 8 lb (86.0 kg), 2 pounds (0.9 kg) per rower more than their opponents. Cambridge saw the return of four former Blues in Chris Baillieu, James Hervey-Bathurst, Christopher Rodrigues and N. G. Hughes, all of whom had made their Boat Race debut in the 1970 race. Oxford welcomed back A. J. Hall, J. Hawksley and F. J. L. Dale, the latter rowing in his third Boat Race for the Dark Blues. Cambridge's American number seven, Somerset Waters III, was the only non-British rower recorded in the race.

Seat	Oxford			Cambridge		
Seat	Name	College	Weight	Name	College	Weight
Bow	D. Hunt	Keble	12 st 11 lb	G. J. Phillpotts	Clare	11 st 11 lb
2	K. Bolshaw	Christ Church	12 st 11 lb	C. L. Baillieu	Jesus	13 st 5 lb
3	S. D. Nevin	Christ Church	13 st 8 lb	J. F. Hervey-Bathurst	Trinity	13 st 4 lb
4	C. R. W. Parish	Christ Church	13 st 10 lb	N. W. James	Jesus	13 st 10 lb
5	D. R. D. Willis	St Peter's	15 st 0 lb	B. A. Sullivan	Selwyn	14 st 7 lb
6	A. J. Hall	Keble	14 st 13 lb	D. L. Maxwell	Jesus	14 st 6 lb
7	F. J. L. Dale (P)	Keble	14 st 13 lb	S. R. Waters III	Trinity	13 st 8 lb
Stroke	J. Hawksley	Balliol	12 st 10 lb	C. J. Rodrigues (P)	Jesus	13 st 6 lb
Cox	M. T. Eastman	Christ Church	8 st 11 lb	N. G. Hughes	Queens'	8 st 12 lb
Source: (P) – Boat club president

== Race ==
The Championship Course along which the Boat Race is contested

Cambridge were pre-race favourites, according to Jim Railton writing in The Times, they were "the strongest favourites for many years". They won the toss and elected to start from the Surrey station, consigning Oxford to Middlesex, from which the losers of the last ten consecutive races had commenced. After a good start, and despite a "desperate attack" from the Dark Blues, Cambridge were three seconds ahead at the Mile Post. The Light Blues were clear soon after and by the time the crews shot Hammersmith Bridge, they held a three length, ten-second lead over Oxford. By Chiswick Steps, the lead had extended out to 18 seconds; Oxford trailed by 26 seconds at Barnes Bridge and could make no ground on Cambridge as they passed the finishing post ten lengths clear. The winning time of 17 minutes 58 seconds was the second fastest in the history of the event, behind that of the Cambridge crew of the 1948 race who recorded a time eight seconds faster.

In the reserve race, Cambridge's Goldie beat Oxford's Isis by fifteen lengths, their fifth consecutive victory. In the 26th running of the Women's Boat Race, Cambridge triumphed, their ninth consecutive victory.
