= George Tintor =

Canadian rower (1957–2021)

Personal information
- Born: 6 May 1957; Toronto, Ontario, Canada
- Died: 30 May 2021 (aged 64); Mississauga, Ontario, Canada

Sport
- Sport: Rowing

George Tintor (6 May 1957 – 30 May 2021) was a Canadian rower. He competed in the men's eight event at the 1976 Summer Olympics. Tintor was of Serbian descent.

Tintor died on 30 May 2021 in Mississauga. His funeral service took place at the All Serbian Saints Serbian Orthodox Church in Mississauga, and he was interred at a later date in Zürich.
