= Richard Cashin (rower) =

American rower (born 1953)

Personal information
- Nationality: American
- Born: April 17, 1953 (age 73) Washington, D.C., United States

Sport
- Sport: Rowing

Richard Cashin (born April 17, 1953) is an American rower. He competed in the men's eight event at the 1976 Summer Olympics. He graduated from Harvard University and Harvard Business School.
