= David Weinberg =

American rower

Personal information
- Born: March 2, 1952 (age 74) Boston, Massachusetts, United States

Sport
- Sport: Rowing

David Bruce Leslie Weinberg (born March 2, 1952) is an American former rower. He competed in the men's eight event at the 1976 Summer Olympics. He graduated from Harvard University.
