= Dirk Gidney =

Canadian rower

Personal information
- Nationality: Canadian
- Born: 23 April 1952 (age 72); Bryn Mawr, Pennsylvania, United States

Sport
- Sport: Rowing

Dirk Gidney (born 23 April 1952) is a Canadian rower. He competed in the men's eight event at the 1976 Summer Olympics.
