= Angel Ramírez (rower) =

Cuban rower

Angel Carlos Ramírez Sánchez
Personal information
- Nationality: Cuban
- Born: 7 July 1955 (age 70)

Sport
- Sport: Rowing
Medal record
Men's rowing
Representing Cuba
Pan American Games
Silver medal – second place	1975 Mexico City	Eight

Angel Carlos Ramírez Sánchez (born 7 July 1955) is a Cuban rower. He competed in the men's eight event at the 1976 Summer Olympics.
