= Helmut Latz =

German rower

Personal information
- Nationality: German
- Born: 12 March 1955 (age 70); Cologne, Germany

Sport
- Sport: Rowing

Helmut Latz (born 12 March 1955) is a German rower. He competed in the men's eight event at the 1976 Summer Olympics.
