= Vladimir Tintor =

Vladimir Tintor may refer to:

- Vladimir Tintor (actor) (born 1978), Serbian film actor
- Vladimir Tintor (footballer) (born 1979), Serbian professional football player
