= James Henniger =

Canadian rower

Personal information
- Nationality: Canadian
- Born: 8 July 1954; Vancouver, British Columbia, Canada
- Died: 29 September 2004 (aged 50); Vancouver, British Columbia, Canada

Sport
- Sport: Rowing

James Henniger (8 July 1954 – 29 September 2004) was a Canadian rower. He competed in the men's eight event at the 1976 Summer Olympics.
