= Alan Shealy =

American rower

Personal information
- Born: August 15, 1953 (age 72) Fitchburg, Massachusetts, U.S.

Sport
- Sport: Rowing

Alan Shealy (born August 15, 1953) is an American rower. He competed in the men's eight event at the 1976 Summer Olympics. He graduated from Harvard University.
