= Bill Mason (rowing coach) =

British rower and rowing coach (born 1950)

Personal information
- Full name: William Graham Mason
- Nationality: British
- Born: 20 August 1950 (age 75) Fulham
Medal record
Men's rowing
Representing Great Britain
World Rowing Championships
Silver medal – second place	1974 Lucerne	Eight

William Graham Mason (born 20 August 1950) is a former British Olympic rower and rowing coach.

== Rowing career ==
Mason won silver in the junior coxed four at the 1968 World Junior Championships He won the coxless fours with Jim Clark, Lenny Robertson and Frederick Smallbone, rowing for the Thames Tradesmen's Rowing Club, at the inaugural 1972 National Rowing Championships. Later in 1972 the same crew was selected for Great Britain at the 1972 Summer Olympics where they just failed to reach the final, finishing in fourth place in the semi-finals of the men's coxless four.

In 1974 he was part of an eight that won Great Britain's silver medal at the 1974 World Rowing Championships and in 1976 went to his second Olympics, where the crew of Mason, Richard Ayling, Neil Keron and David Townsend reached the semi-finals of the men's coxless four. He won at Henley Royal Regatta three times as an athlete.

== Coaching ==
He has coached multiple crews to victory at Henley Royal Regatta, including Thames Tradesmen's RC, Imperial College BC and Westminster School BC, plus various composite crews.

He coached the women's lightweight double sculls to a silver medal in 1986. He also coached the first Great Britain women's sweep crew to win a world title, in 1993, and was chief coach for GB women at the 1996 Olympics.
