= Josef Neštický =

Czech rower (born 1951)

Personal information
- Nationality: Czech
- Born: 25 January 1951 (age 74); Šternberk, Czechoslovakia

Sport
- Sport: Rowing

Josef Neštický (born 25 January 1951) is a Czech rower. He competed at the 1976 Summer Olympics and the 1980 Summer Olympics.
