= Charles Veley =

American traveler and businessman

Charles Veley is an American claimant to the title of the world's most-traveled person.

== Mosttraveledpeople.com ==
Veley operates a website, mosttraveledpeople.com, which details his travels and invites people to register their own travel histories. The "Master List", a list of countries, territories, autonomous regions, enclaves, geographically separated island groups, and major states and provinces, is said to make up the world. There are 1500 items on the list right now. No one has visited them all; Veley himself holds ninth position.

== Personal life ==
He lives in San Francisco, and is divorced with three children. He graduated from Harvard College with a degree in computer science.
