= David Maxwell (rower) =

British rower (1951–2023)

Personal information
- Nationality: British
- Born: 8 April 1951 Nairn, Scotland
- Died: 18 December 2023 (aged 72)
Medal record
Men's rowing
Representing Great Britain
Olympic Games
Silver medal – second place	1976 Montreal	Eight
World Rowing Championships
Silver medal – second place	1974 Lucerne	Eight

David Lindsay Maxwell (8 April 1951 – 18 December 2023) was a British rower who competed in the 1972 Summer Olympics and in the 1976 Summer Olympics.

== Rowing career ==
Maxwell was educated at Eton College and Jesus College, Cambridge. In 1968 he rowed in the Eton College eight that won the silver medal in the FISA World Youth Championships in Amsterdam. In 1969 he rowed in the Eton College coxless four that won the Visitors' Challenge Cup at Henley Royal Regatta and then won the silver medal in the FISA World Youth Championships in Naples.

Maxwell rowed in the winning Cambridge Boat Race crews in both 1971 and 1972. Also during 1972 he won the coxed pairs title with Michael Hart and Alan Inns, at the 1972 National Rowing Championships.

In 1972 at the Summer Olympics in Munich, he partnered Mike Hart to finish eighth in the coxed pair event. In 1974 he was a member of the British eight which won the silver medal at the Lucerne World Championships and two years later in 1976, at the Summer Olympics in Montreal he won the silver medal in the eight event.

== Personal life and death ==
Maxwell died at his home on 18 December 2023, at the age of 72.

== See also ==
- List of Cambridge University Boat Race crews
