= Jim Clark (rower) =

British rower (born 1950)

Personal information
- Born: James Clark; 15 July 1950 (age 76)
- Height: 190 cm (6 ft 3 in)
- Weight: 89 kg (196 lb)
- Spouse: Lin Clark

Sport
- Sport: Rowing
- Club: Thames Tradesmen's RC
Medal record
Men's rowing
Representing Great Britain
Olympic Games
Silver medal – second place	1976 Montreal	Eight
World Rowing Championships
Silver medal – second place	1974 Lucerne	Eight
Silver medal – second place	1977 Amsterdam	Coxless pair Silver Medal 1978 World Rowing Championships Karapiro Coxless Pair

James Clark (born 15 July 1950) is a British rower who competed in the 1972 Summer Olympics, in the 1976 Summer Olympics, and in the 1980 Summer Olympics.

== Rowing career ==
Clark won the coxless fours with Lenny Robertson, Bill Mason and Frederick Smallbone, rowing for the Thames Tradesmen's Rowing Club, at the inaugural 1972 National Rowing Championships. Later in 1972 the same crew was selected for Great Britain at the 1972 Summer Olympics, where they just failed to reach the final, finishing in fourth place in the semi-finals of the men's coxless four.

Four years later at the 1976 Summer Olympics in Montreal he won the silver medal with the British boat in the eights competition, having also won the world silver medal in eights at the 1974 World Rowing Championships in Lucerne. At the 1977 (Amsterdam) and 1978 (Karapiro NZ) World Rowing Championships, he won silver medals both years rowing with John Roberts in the coxless pair event.

At the 1980 Games in Moscow he and his partner Chris Baillieu finished fourth in the double sculls contest.

He won at Henley Royal Regatta a total of eight times and was selected for the GB national team from 1970 until his retirement from competition in 1982.

During the early 1970s he was a physical education schoolmaster at Cardinal Vaughan Grammar School, where he taught and coached the future Olympic champion oarsman Martin Cross. Cross identifies Clark as a major influence and inspiration in his memoirs. Subsequently, Clark was master in charge of rowing at Latymer Upper School, where among his early protégés there was the double Olympic rowing gold medallist, Andy Holmes. In 1985 he was appointed, by Tor Nilsen, as an Italian national coach and ran the rowing programme at the Fiat Aviation Rowing club in Turin, Italy. He then became a DT teacher in the 90s and gained his MA in education. He retired from teaching in the summer of 2010. James Clark also coached at the 1984 Los Angeles Olympics, where his sculler Beryl Mitchell finished sixth in the final. In 1992 he was the chief Olympic coach to the Danish Rowing Team, where his crew finished seventh in the eights.

His wife Lin Clark was one of the most prominent international oarswomen in Britain in the 1970s and 80s, initially as a heavyweight but later (from the early 80s on) as a lightweight. In 1985, coached by Jim and Mark Hayter she and Beryl Crockford (née Mitchell/Martin) were the world champion lightweight double scull crew, and the following year, coached by Jim, she was in the silver-medal-winning lightweight coxless four and winner of the Commonwealth Games.

== Personal life ==
Jim is married to former Olympic athlete Lin Clark with whom he has one daughter, Jessica.
