= John Yallop =

British rower

Personal information
- Nationality: British
- Born: 24 October 1949 (age 76) Luton, Bedfordshire

Sport
- Club: Leander Club
Medal record
Men's rowing
Representing Great Britain
Olympic Games
Silver medal – second place	1976 Montreal	Eight
World Rowing Championships
Silver medal – second place	1974 Lucerne	Eight

John C. Yallop (born 24 October 1949) is a retired British rower who competed in the 1976 Summer Olympics.

== Rowing career ==
Yallop won the coxless pairs title rowing for the Thames Tradesmen's and Leander composite, with Lenny Robertson, at the 1973 National Rowing Championships. He participated in the 1974 World Rowing Championships in Lucerne, competing in the eights event in which Great Britain won a silver medal.

In 1976 he was a crew member of the British boat which won the silver medal in the eights event at the 1976 Olympic Games.

== Personal life ==
He was educated at Bedford Modern School.
