= Tim Crooks =

British rower

Personal information
- Full name: Timothy John Crooks
- Nationality: British
- Born: 12 May 1949 (age 77)

Sport
- Club: Leander Club; Kingston Rowing Club
Medal record
Men's rowing
Representing Great Britain
Olympic Games
Silver medal – second place	1976 Montreal	Eight
World Rowing Championships
Silver medal – second place	1974 Lucerne	Eight

Timothy John Crooks (born 12 May 1949) is a former British rower who competed at the 1972 Summer Olympics and the 1976 Summer Olympics. He was seven times winner at Henley Royal Regatta and won the Wingfield Sculls three times.

== Rowing career ==
Crooks was educated at Radley College and raced in the World Youth Championships in 1967. He won the Thames Challenge Cup at Henley Royal Regatta in 1968 competing for Leander Club, then won Silver Goblets in 1971 competing for Leander Club and partnering Glyn Locke. He raced in the 1971 World Rowing Championships in the coxless pair, then in 1972 switched to the double scull with Patrick Delafield, winning the Double Sculls Challenge Cup at Henley and the double sculls with Delafield, at the inaugural 1972 National Rowing Championships. Crooks and Delafield reached the final rowing for Great Britain at the 1972 Summer Olympics at Munich and led briefly before finishing out of the medals in fifth.

In 1973 Crooks moved to the eight, winning the silver medal at the 1974 World Rowing Championships behind the U.S., and the Grand Challenge Cup at Henley in 1975 (in which year he also finished 4th in the World Championships in the coxed four). He won the silver medal in the eight rowing at the 1976 Summer Olympics in Montreal, behind the East German crew. Crooks then competed in the single scull winning the Diamond Challenge Sculls at Henley and the Wingfield Sculls in both 1977 and 1978. In 1980 he repeated his win of the Wingfield Sculls.

In 1977 he came fourth in the World Championships in the single scull.

He won the single sculls title, rowing for the Kingston Rowing Club, at the 1982 National Rowing Championships and competing again at Henley in 1983, he won the Queen Mother Challenge Cup and came second in the Diamond Challenge, then in 1984 was runner-up in the Double Sculls.

== Other activities ==
Crooks won the 1977 version of the BBC television show Superstars.

From the late 1980s to the late 1990s he taught Craft Design Technology at St. John's School, Leatherhead having taught previously at Glyn School in Ewell.

The day of the opening ceremony for the London Olympics, 2012, he rowed in Gloriana from Hampton Court to City Hall.
