= Chris Baillieu =

British rower (born 1949)

Personal information
- Full name: Christopher Latham Baillieu
- Nationality: British
- Born: 12 December 1949 (age 76) Marylebone
- Education: University of Cambridge (BA)
- Height: 6 ft 3 in (190 cm)
- Weight: 187 lb (85 kg)
- Spouse: Jane Elizabeth Bowie
Medal record
Men's rowing
Representing Great Britain
Olympic Games
Silver medal – second place	1976 Montreal	Double sculls
World Rowing Championships
Bronze medal – third place	1974 Lucerne	Double sculls
Bronze medal – third place	1975 Nottingham	Double sculls
Gold medal – first place	1977 Amsterdam	Double sculls
European Rowing Championships
Bronze medal – third place	1973 Moscow	Double sculls

Christopher Latham Baillieu MBE (born 12 December 1949) is an English former rower who competed in the 1976 Summer Olympics and in the 1980 Summer Olympics representing Great Britain. He was the first chairman of British Swimming, from 2001 to 2008.

== Early life ==
Baillieu was born in Marylebone, the son of Edward Latham Baillieu and his wife Betty Anne Jardine Taylor. He was the grandson of Clive Baillieu, 1st Baron Baillieu. He was educated at Radley College and at Jesus College, Cambridge. He was called to the Bar at Lincoln's Inn in 1976.

== Rowing ==
Baillieu rowed in the winning Cambridge boat in the Boat Races in 1970, 1971, 1972 and 1973. He then concentrated on sculling, and won the Double Sculls Challenge Cup at Henley Royal Regatta with Mike Hart in 1973 and 1975. In between he won the double sculls title with Mike Hart, at the 1974 National Championships and participated in the 1974 World Rowing Championships in Lucerne, competing in the double sculls event with Hart again, which resulted in winning a bronze medal. He was part of the double scull that won a bronze medal at the 1975 World Rowing Championships in Nottingham.

In Montreal they won a silver medal for double sculls rowing at the 1976 Summer Olympics. The same pair won the Double Sculls Challenge Cup again in 1977 and a gold medal at the World Championships. Hart and Baillieu won the Double Sculls Challenge Cup again in 1978 but in 1979 he won with a new partner Jim Clark. In 1980, Baillieu and Clark finished fourth in the Double Sculls, rowing at the 1980 Summer Olympics in Moscow.

Baillieu then concentrated on single sculls and won the Wingfield Sculls four years running from 1981 to 1984, and the Diamond Challenge Sculls at Henley Royal Regatta in 1981, 1982, and 1984. He also won the single sculls rowing for the Leander Club, at the 1981 National Championships.

== Personal ==
In 1984, Baillieu married Jane Elizabeth Bowie with whom he has had two sons and one daughter Charles, Olivia, and Edward.

== See also ==
- List of Cambridge University Boat Race crews
