= Frederick Smallbone =

British rower (born 1948)

Fred Smallbone
Personal information
- Nationality: British
- Born: 22 January 1948 (age 78) Edmonton, Greater London

Sport
- Club: Thames Tradesmen's Rowing Club
Medal record
Men's rowing
Representing Great Britain
Olympic Games
| Silver medal – second place | 1976 Montreal | Eight |
World Rowing Championships
| Silver medal – second place | 1974 Lucerne | Eight |

Frederick John Smallbone (born 22 January 1948) is a British rower who competed in the 1972 Summer Olympics and in the 1976 Summer Olympics.

== Rowing career ==
Smallbone won the coxless fours with Jim Clark, Bill Mason and Lenny Robertson, rowing for the Thames Tradesmen's Rowing Club, at the inaugural 1972 National Rowing Championships. Later in 1972 the same crew was selected for Great Britain at the 1972 Summer Olympics where they just failed to reach the final, finishing in fourth place in the semi-finals of the men's coxless four.

In 1974 he was part of an eight that won Great Britain's silver medal at the 1974 World Rowing Championships and the following year he won the coxless pairs with Glyn Locke, rowing for the a Leander and Thames Tradesmen's composite, at the 1975 National Rowing Championships. The following year he won the silver medal with the British boat in the eights competition at the 1976 Summer Olympics.
