= Steve Handley =

Australian rower

Stephen Handley OAM
Personal information
- Born: Stephen James Handley; 28 June 1956 (age 70)
- Education: Newington College
- Occupations: Director; ATI Australia Pty Limited
- Spouse: Kim Handley
- Website: Stephen Handley Profile

Sport
- Club: Sydney Rowing Club

Achievements and titles
- Olympic finals: Moscow 1980
- National finals: King's Cup 1977-79

Stephen James Handley OAM (born 28 June 1956) is an Australian former rower - a fifteen-time national champion, representative at world championships and an Olympian.

He is a director of Rowing Australia, honorary life member, former board member, deputy president of Rowing New South Wales.

Handley is also an honorary life member of Sydney Rowing Club. From 2009 until 2014 he was Club Captain of Sydney Rowing Club and is currently Vice-President.

Handley has coached rowing since 1979, at Sydney Rowing Club, Newington College, St Joseph's College and The King's School with success at NSW Championship, Australian championships and at the New South Wales Head of the River regatta.

== Club and state rowing career ==
Handley commenced rowing whilst a student at Newington College (1969–1974). His senior club rowing was from the Sydney Rowing Club. In 1974 Handley won a New South Wales state title in the youth four, won the schoolboy four title at the Australian Rowing Championships and while still aged eighteen represented New South Wales in an U23 eight in a Trans Tasman series against New Zealand. He has won numerous State Championships (including the champion eight of NSW five times in SRC colours) and Australian Championships in the coxed pair, coxed four and eights. Between 1974 and 1980, he won thirteen National Championships and two King's Cups for New South Wales.

== International representative rowing ==
He made his Australian representative debut in the men's eight which rowed to tenth place at the 1977 World Rowing Championships in Amsterdam, the Netherlands. He was again in the Australian eight at Lake Karapiro, 1978). In 1980, he was in the Australian eight at the Moscow Olympics when they rowed to a fifth place in the Olympic final.

== Coach ==
Handley has coached rowing since 1979, at Sydney Rowing Club, Newington College, St Joseph's College and The King's School enjoying success at the New South Wales Head of the River regatta, NSW Championships, Australian Championships as well as many other major domestic regattas.

== Business career ==
Handley is a co-founder and former director of telecommunications engineering company ATI Australia Pty Limited and its wholly owned subsidiaries ATI Telecom Pty Ltd, Socius Technology Pty Ltd and InHouse Energy .

== Honours and awards ==
In the 2025 King's Birthday Honours, Handley was awarded the Medal of the Order of Australia, for services to rowing.
