= Lenny Robertson =

British rower (born 1950)

Personal information
- Born: Leonard David Robertson; 10 October 1950 (age 75) Hammersmith
- Height: 186 cm (6 ft 1 in)
- Weight: 89 kg (196 lb)

Sport
- Sport: Rowing
- Club: Thames Tradesmen's Rowing Club
Medal record
Men's rowing
Representing Great Britain
Olympic Games
Silver medal – second place	1976 Montreal	Eight
World Rowing Championships
Silver medal – second place	1974 Lucerne	Eight

Leonard David Robertson (born 10 October 1950) is a British rower who competed in the 1972 Summer Olympics, in the 1976 Summer Olympics, and in the 1980 Summer Olympics.

== Rowing career ==
Robertson won the coxless fours with Jim Clark, Bill Mason and Frederick Smallbone, rowing for the Thames Tradesmen's Rowing Club, at the inaugural 1972 National Rowing Championships. Later in 1972 the same crew was selected for Great Britain at the 1972 Summer Olympics where they just failed to reach the final, finishing in fourth place in the semi-finals of the men's coxless four. The following year he won the coxless pairs title rowing for the Thames Tradesmen's and Leander composite, with John Yallop, at the 1973 National Rowing Championships.

In 1974 he was part of an eight that won Great Britain's silver medal at the 1974 World Rowing Championships and in 1976 he won the silver medal with the British boat in the eights event at the 1976 Olympic Games. In 1977 he was part of the eight that reached the final and finished 5th, at the 1977 World Rowing Championships in Amsterdam.

At the 1980 Olympic Games he was part of the British boat which finished seventh in the coxed four contest. He later became head coach of the Nottinghamshire County Rowing Association.
