= Sydney Rowing Club =

Australian rowing club

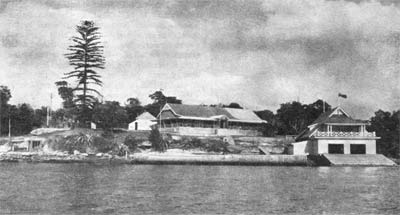

- Motto: Mens Sana in Corpore Sano
- Location: Abbotsford, Sydney, Australia
- Home water: Parramatta River, Sydney Harbour
- Founded: 6 March 1870
- Affiliations: NSW Rowing Association
- Website: www.sydneyrowingclub.com.au

Sydney Rowing Club is the oldest rowing club in New South Wales, Australia formed in 1870. It has occupied its current site on Port Jackson's Parramatta River at Abbotsford Point since 1874. The club has a focus on its high performance and elite rowing programs and as of the 2021 Olympic Games, sixty-eight rowers from the club had competed at the Olympic Games rowing in one hundred and two of the seats raced by Australian Olympic crews. Over one hundred club members have achieved national selection.

Bennelong Point & the 1st Sydney Rowing Club shed 1880

== Club history ==
A group of sportsmen interested in the advancement of amateur rowing met at the Oxford Hotel in Sydney on 6 March 1870 and the Sydney Rowing club was born. George Thornton a former mayor of Sydney was the club's first President. Its first club house was on a site adjacent to the current Sydney Opera House at Bennelong Point. That clubhouse was opened in August 1870 by His Excellency, the 4th Earl Belmore, the then Governor of New South Wales.

The club was founded on the principle of amateurism under the notion popular at the time, that manual labourers being as they were paid for their effort and toil had an unfair advantage in races involving physical exertion. When the New South Wales Rowing Association was formed in the 1870s with some of the SRC directors as driving forces, races were to be conducted by bona-fide amateurs only. The colours of the Sydney Rowing Club were initially blue and white. They were altered to light blue before 1886. The club motto, "Mens sana in corpore sano" ("A healthy mind in a healthy body") was adopted at the very outset while the club's crest was adopted in 1910.

In 1874 the club's Directors arranged for the purchase of a property known as the Red Cow Inn on the point at Abbotsford, seven miles up river from Circular Quay. The Inn had abundant accommodation being located at the end of Great North Road where it met the ferry from Bedlam Point (Gladesville). The site was initially a training and recreation "branch" facility with accommodation for members to stop-over. In 1888 the club received notice from the Government to quit its site at Circular Quay and secured another site on the western side of Woolloomooloo Bay between Mrs Macquarie's Chair and the Domain Baths, where the headquarters of the Club remained until 1947.

The branch site had been significantly developed in the interim 70-year period and in 1947 the boatshed at Woolloomooloo was dismantled and rebuilt at Abottsford which marked the relocation of all club facilities to Abbotsford.

== Competition history & representative success ==
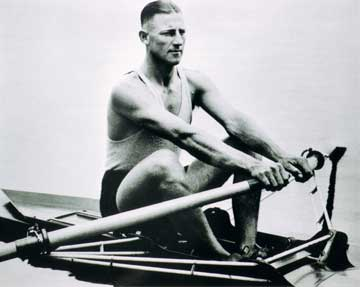
Bobby Pearce at the 1928 Amsterdam Olympics

For eight successive years from 1880 to 1888 the SRC won the New South Wales Rowing Association's premiership pennant, a run that wouldn't be matched until 1929 by the Mosman Rowing Club. The Association's premiership was again won continuously from 1903/04 to 1908/09 and when a junior pennant was introduced in 1908/09 that was won too.

Bobby Pearce was the dominant world sculler from the late 20s and along with Herb Turner at the national level in the early 30s, they established Sydney's credentials as a force in single sculls. Merv Wood continued to shine the club's light in sculling in the 40s and 50s.

Following World War II, Australian Olympic teams increased in size; the rowing squad began to send larger crews & boats and Sydney club rowers contributed significantly to representative squads up till the mid 1970s and to a lesser extent ever since.

Sydney and Leichhardt men made up the entire contingent of the squad of thirteen who travelled to Helsinki 1952 with Sydney contributing nine of those athletes. This pattern continued in the next two decades with an entire Sydney coxed four of Alf Duval, Alan Grover, Mick Allan, John Campbell and Gary Herford selected to compete at Tokyo 1964 under coach Phil Cayzer who a few years later recruited a number of national senior rowers to join Duval, Grover, Joe Fazio and Michael Morgan at Sydney to create the men's eight for the 1968 Summer Olympics. Eight of the sixteen man squad for Munich 1972 plus coach Allan Callaway were from the club followed by five of the twelve man squad for Montreal 1976 plus coach Morgan and team official John Coates.

From Amsterdam 1928 until Tokyo 2020 the Sydney club had at least one representative in every Australian Olympic rowing squad with the single exception of Barcelona 1992.

== Club Presidents ==
- George Thornton was the club's first President from 1870 till his death in 1901.
- Quarton Levitt Deloitte called the foundation meeting of the club in 1870 and was its first Captain from 1870 till 1901. He replaced George Thornton as the club's second President in 1901 holding that position till 1928.
- Clarrie Smith became the club's third President in 1928, 59 years after it was first formed. He had been a top oarsman of the 1890s and a subsequent club stalwart.
- Andrew Sneddon (1935 to 46) a General Manager of the AMP Society and a member since 1902.
- Harry Kerr (1946 to 1954) who had in his career competed for Mercantile, Leichhardt and SRC.
- Fred Meares (1954 to 1964).
- George Parlby OAM (1964 to 1970).
- Ernie Chapman OAM (1975 to 1978) and (1979–95), an Olympic medallist.
- Ossie Rosevear (1978–79), a world-class regatta and racing official.
- Ian Clubb (1995–97), an Olympian.
- Keith Jameson OAM (1997-)

== Members ==
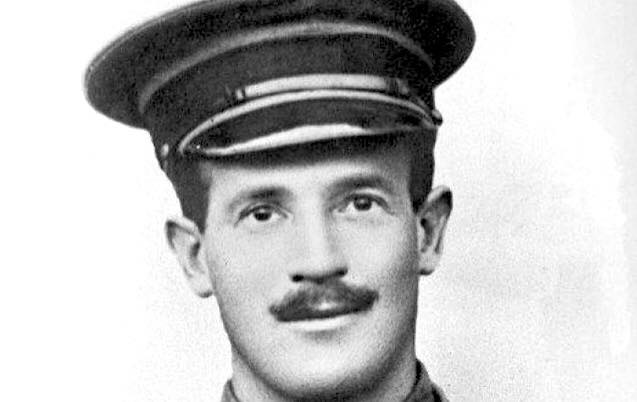
Keith Heritage, the first AIF volunteer for WWI

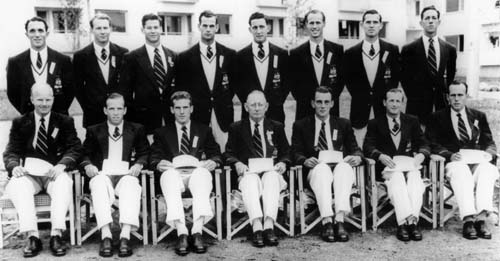
Nine SRC men were in 1952 Olympic squad incl Chessel & Tinning seated right, Chapman standing left, Cayzer seat 2nd fm left

Membership of the club was male-only until 1993, when the Club decided that it would allow women to become members.

Notable past members include:

- Australia's first Prime Minister Edmund Barton was a foundation member of the club.
- Sir James Reading Fairfax (1834–1919), son of newspaper scion John Fairfax.
- AB "Banjo" Paterson, a member in the early 1880s and wrote his poem "On the Water" based on his rowing interest.
- Sir Samuel Hordern of the firm Anthony Hordern & Sons was a club Vice-President and donated an eight in 1893.
- Captain Keith Heritage, Australia's first volunteer for the AIF at the outbreak of WWI. Twice a national champion (M8+) and a Grand Challenge Cup winner.
- Sgt. Albert "Gig" Smedley, the coxswain of the victorious AIF men's eight at the 1919 Royal Peace Regatta held following the end of World War I.
- John Coates, manager of the Australian Olympic team at Montreal 1976 and Los Angeles 1984, member of the Australian Olympic Committee since 1982 and member of the International Olympic Committee (IOC) since 2001.
- Kendall Brodie, first female coxswain of an Australian men's eight and 2018 winner of the Grand Challenge Cup.

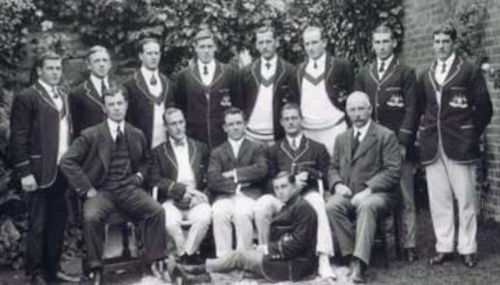
1912 Aust Olympic VIII Hauenstein, Middleton, Ryrie standing 2,3&4 fm right; Fitzhardinge seated 2nd fm left

Olympic representative members include:

- Sydney Middleton, John Ryrie, Roger Fitzhardinge Olympic competitors Stockholm 1912.
- Bobby Pearce dual Olympic gold medallist Amsterdam 1928 & Los Angeles 1932.
- Merv Wood, who competed at four Olympics winning one gold, one silver and one bronze and who carried the Australian flag at two Olympic Games.
- Bill Dixon and Herbert Turner competed in the men's double scull at the 1936 Berlin Olympics.
- Phil Cayzer, Ernie Chapman, Bob Tinning and Tom Chessell Olympic bronze medallists Helsinki 1952.
- Vic Middleton, Don Palmer, John Rogers and Murray Riley Olympic competitors Helsinki 1952.
- Alf Duval, Joe Fazio were Olympic silver medallists Mexico City 1968.
- Michael Morgan and Alan Grover were Olympic silver medallists in the VIII at Mexico City 1968 and were in the Australian VIII which competed at Munich 1972 while Morgan coached the VIII at Montreal 1976.
- Mick Allan, John Campbell and Gary Herford competed with Duval and Grover in a 4+ at Tokyo 1964.
- Gary Pearce competed at Mexico City 1968 and at Munich 1972.
- John Ranch and John Nickson and coach Alan Callaway were competitors at Mexico City 1968.
- Rob Paver competed in the Australian VIII at Munich 1972 and Montreal 1976.
- Kim Mackney and Chris Stevens were in the coxless pair at Munich 1972 while Richard Curtin & Bryan Curtin were in the men's VIII.
- Islay Lee competed at Montreal 1976 and in the Australian men's VIII at Moscow 1980.
- Ian Clubb, Stuart Carter and Ted Hale were competitors at Montreal 1976.
- Steve Handley competed in the Australian men's VIII at Moscow 1980.
- Jim Stride rowed in the coxless pair at Los Angeles 1984.
- Dale Caterson coxed the Australian men's VIII at Seoul 1988 after having won gold in Australian VIIIs at the 1986 Commonwealth Games and the 1986 World Championships.
- Rob Jahrling competed at Atlanta 1996, won silver in the men's VIII at Sydney 2000, competed at Athens 2004.
- Robert Walker and Richard Wearne were competitors at Atlanta 1996.
- Daniel Burke and Alastair Gordon Olympic silver medallists and Matthew Long a bronze medallist at the Sydney 2000.
- Jodi Winter competed at the Sydney 2000 and at the Athens 2004.
- Kristina Larsen competed in the Australian women's VIII at the Sydney 2000.
- Katie Foulkes competed at the Athens 2004.
- James Chapman Olympic competitor and Silver Medalist Beijing 2008 & London 2012.
- Tess Gerrand Olympic competitor London 2012.
- Spencer Turrin, Alexander Lloyd and Christopher Morgan Olympic competitors Rio 2016.
- Turrin and Joshua Hicks were Tokyo 2020 Olympic champions in the M4-.

World champions include:

- Edward Trickett, the first Australian to be declared world champion in any sport winning the World Sculling Championship 27 June 1876.
- Bobby Pearce world professional sculling champion 1933-38.
- Dominic Grimm 2010 World Champion in M2+.
- Philip Adams and Louis Snelson 2011 Junior World Champions in M4+.
- Spencer Turrin and Joshua Hicks back-to-back World Champions in M4- in 2017 and 2018.

== Honours ==
=== Henley Royal Regatta ===
Year	Races won
1912	Grand Challenge Cup
2005	Fawley Challenge Cup
2009	Wyfold Challenge Cup
2011	Fawley Challenge Cup
2015	Britannia Challenge Cup
2019	Wyfold Challenge Cup
