= Malcolm Shaw (rower) =

Australian rower (1947–2014)

Personal information
- Full name: Malcolm Campbell Shaw
- Nationality: Australian
- Born: 7 October 1947 Whakatāne, New Zealand
- Died: 8 May 2014 (aged 66) Tauranga, New Zealand

Sport
- Sport: Rowing

Achievements and titles
- National finals: King's Cup 1971–1975; New Zealand C'ships 1968, 74

Malcolm Campbell Shaw (7 October 1947 – 8 May 2014) was a New Zealand-born, Australian representative rower. He competed for Australia at the 1972 Summer Olympics and the 1976 Summer Olympics.

== Club and state rowing ==
Born in Whakatāne, New Zealand, Shaw attended high school there and took a trade as a fitter and welder. He rowed for the Whakatane Rowing Club and raced in a maiden four and as a sculler. He won the maiden single sculls title at the New Zealand national championships in 1968.

Shaw relocated to Sydney in 1969 and joined the Mosman Rowing Club. In Mosman crews he contested both the coxed and the coxless four events at the 1970 Australian Rowing Championships and he won the national title in the coxless four. He won the national coxless pair title in a composite crew with Tim Conrad in 1975. In 1976 he again contested both the coxed and the coxless four events in Mosman boats and won the coxless four national championship.

He first made state selection for New South Wales in the men's eight which contested the 1971 King's Cup at the annual Interstate Regatta. He raced in further New South Wales King's Cup crews in 1972, 1973 and 1975 and saw victories in 1972 and 1975.

Following his return to New Zealand in 1973 Shaw rowed again for the Whakatane Rowing Club in their men's eight in 1973–74. That crew won the 1974 New Zealand championship.

== International representative rowing ==
The entire New South Wales winning King's Cup eight of 1972 was selected as the Australian eight to compete at the 1972 Munich Olympics. Shaw was in the six seat of that boat when they rowed to an eighth place finish in Munich.

In the 1974 season back in New Zealand he pursued selection in the New Zealand national eight but was unsuccessful. He returned to Australia and although he had not rowed in that year's winning New South Wales King's Cup crew he made selection in the Australian eight for the 1974 World Rowing Championships. That crew finished in eight place. In 1975 Shaw was again selected in the Australian eight stacked with New South Welshmen from Shaw's 1975 victorious King's Cup crew. The Australian eight travelled to the 1975 World Rowing Championships in Nottingham, came second in their heat, won the repechage and finished sixth in the final.

In 1976 Shaw in the two seat and Brian Richardson at bow were the only two members selected to the Australian Olympic eight who hadn't rowed in the 1976 New South Wales King's Cup crew. In Montreal the eight commenced their Olympic racing with a win in the heat and progressed to the final. However in that heat Shaw suffered a collapsed vertebra which put him out of the crew. He was given two days off and retried but was unable to compete and had to be replaced by Peter Shakespear, the reserve. In the final the Australians finished fifth. The back injury would prove to be the end of Mal Shaw's competitive rowing career although he had subsequent success as a coach of lightweight women's crews at Mosman.

== Death ==
Shaw died on 8 May 2014 at Tauranga Hospital.
