= Brian Richardson (rower) =

Australian rower (1947–2024)

Personal information
- Nationality: Australian
- Born: 24 July 1947 Adelaide, South Australia, Australia
- Died: 15 September 2024 (aged 77)

Sport
- Sport: Rowing
- Club: Adelaide Uni Boat Club; Monash Uni Boat Club

Achievements and titles
- Olympic finals: Montreal 1976 M8+ Moscow 1980 M8+
- National finals: King's Cup 1966–1980

Brian John Richardson (24 July 1947 – 15 September 2024) was an Australian rower and rowing coach. He competed at the national elite level over a fifteen-year period representing both South Australia and Victoria. He was a representative at three world championships and at the 1976 Montreal and the 1980 Moscow Olympics. In a twenty-three year coaching career, he held national head coaching roles in both Canada and Australia from 1993 to 2008 and personally coached national crews to twelve world championship or Olympic medals. He was also a crew member of America's Cup winning Australia II.

== Club and state rowing ==
Born in Adelaide, Richardson rowed from the Adelaide University Boat Club from 1966 till his relocation to Victoria in 1975. In Melbourne he rowed from the Monash University Boat Club and later he coached at the Banks Rowing Club and Mercantile Rowing Club.

Richardson stroked the Adelaide University eight at the 1973 and the 1974 Intervarsity Championships. The AUBC eight won the 1974 Intervarsity Championship.

Richardson first made state selection for South Australia still aged eighteen, in the men's eight contesting the King's Cup at the 1966 Interstate Regatta. He rowed in eight successive South Australian King's Cup eights, placing second twice and stroking the 1973 and 1974 SA eights. After relocating to Melbourne, Richardson was selected in Victoria's King's Cup eight for the 1975 Interstate Regatta. He rowed in six consecutive Victorian King's Cup eights up to 1980, stroking those crews from 1978 and winning the King's Cup in 1979 and 1980. In total, Richardson rowed in fourteen consecutive King's Cup championships, five at stroke and won the event twice.

At the 1972 Australian Rowing Championships Richardson rowed in an AUBC four contesting the national coxless four title. They placed third. In 1976 and 1977 he again contested the coxed four national titles in Monash Uni/Melb Uni composite crews placing third, then second. He stroked a composite Monash Uni/Mercantile coxless four to second place in their national title attempt at the 1978 Australian Championships and in 1979 stroked a Monash/MUBC crew again to second place in that same event. In 1980 his final year of competition in Monash University colours he raced in both a coxed four (to fourth place) and a coxless pair (to third place) in national title attempts.

== International representative rowing ==
Richardson made his Australian representative debut in the six seat of the Australian men's eight at the 1975 World Rowing Championships in Nottingham. That crew placed second in its heat, won the repechage and finished in sixth place in the final. The Australian men's eight for the 1976 Montreal Olympics was mostly that year's King's Cup winning New South Wales crew excepting Richardson at bow and Malcolm Shaw in the two seat. They commenced their Olympic campaign with a heat win in a new world record time and progressed to the final. In the heat Shaw suffered a collapsed vertebra which saw him out of the eight and replaced by Peter Shakespear, the reserve. In the final the Australians finished fifth.

At the 1978 World Rowing Championships in Lake Karapiro he stroked Australia's coxless four to a ninth-place finish. For the 1979 World Rowing Championships in Bled, Richardson was the stroke of the Australian men's eight. An injury during the campaign to Rob Lang saw the squad's selected sculler Ted Hale step into the five seat of the eight. That crew placed third in their semi-final and fourth in the final.

For the 1980 Moscow Olympics the new Australian Director of Coaching Reinhold Batschi utilised small boating racing criteria and selected an eight with rowers from three states and picked the veteran Richardson as the stroke-man. The Australian eight finished in fifth place in the Olympic final.

== Coaching career ==
Richardson enjoyed a stellar coaching career over a twenty-four year period. He coached eleven Victorian King's Cup crews and took seven of them to King's Cup victory. He coached twelve Australian crews to seven different world championships winning one gold and one bronze medal and took crews to three Olympics. While he was head coach of Canada, Canadian crews won sixty five medals at world championships and Olympics.

Richardson had national head coaching roles for Canada from 1993 to 1996 and again from 2001 to 2004 and for Australia from 1997 to 2000. Back in Australia from 2005 to 2008 he was the national men's coach and head coach at the Australian Institute of Sport. Overall, crews individually coached by Richardson won seven gold, four silver and one bronze Olympic or world championship medals.

== Sailing and Australia II ==
In 1983 Richardson was a crewman on Australia II, the Royal Perth Yacht Club's entrant which contested and won the 1983 America's Cup. Richardson was a grinder in a crew skippered by John Bertrand which became the first ever successful America's Cup challenger and ended a 132-year tenure by the New York Yacht Club.

His participation led to him being awarded the Medal of the Order of Australia in the 1984 Australia Day Honours. He was awarded the Australian Sports Medal in 2000.

== Death ==
Richardson died on 15 September 2024, at the age of 77.

== Rowing palmares ==
=== World Championships ===
- 1975 World Rowing Championships men's eight six seat – sixth
- 1978 World Rowing Championships coxless four stroke – ninth
- 1979 World Rowing Championships men's eight stroke – fourth

=== Olympic Games ===
- 1976 Munich Olympics M8+ bow – fifth
- 1980 Moscow Olympics M8+ stroke - fifth

=== National Interstate Regatta ===
- 1966 – Interstate Championships Men's Eight (SA) four seat – third
- 1967 – Interstate Championships Men's Eight (SA) four seat – third
- 1968 – Interstate Championships Men's Eight (SA) stroke – fourth
- 1970 – Interstate Championships Men's Eight (SA) bow – second
- 1971 – Interstate Championships Men's Eight (SA) seven seat – second
- 1972 – Interstate Championships Men's Eight (SA) seven seat – fourth
- 1973 – Interstate Championships Men's Eight (SA) stroke - third
- 1974 – Interstate Championships Men's Eight (SA) stroke - second
- 1975 – Interstate Championships Men's Eight (VIC) six seat - third
- 1976 – Interstate Championships Men's Eight (VIC) stroke - second
- 1977 – Interstate Championships Men's Eight (VIC) five seat - third
- 1978 – Interstate Championships Men's Eight (VIC) stroke - second
- 1979 – Interstate Championships Men's Eight (VIC) stroke – first
- 1980 – Interstate Championships Men's Eight (VIC) stroke – first

== Coaching palmares ==
=== Olympic Games ===
- 1992 Barcelona Olympics – Men's Eight coach – fifth
- 2000 Sydney Olympics – Men's Eight coach – silver
- 2008 Beijing Olympics - Men's Eight coach - sixth

=== Commonwealth Games ===
- 1986 – Commonwealth Games – Men's Coxless Four coach – Fourth
- 1986 – Commonwealth Games – Men's Coxless Pair coach – Fifth

=== World Championships ===
- 1989 World Rowing Championships – men's double scull coach - fourth
- 1990 World Rowing Championships – men's double scull coach – bronze
- 1991 World Rowing Championships – men's dingle scull coach – fourth
- 1991 World Rowing Championships – men's quad scull coach - twelfth
- 1999 World Rowing Championships – men's eight coach – seventh
- 2005 World Rowing Championships – men's coxed pair coach – gold
- 2005 World Rowing Championships – men's quad scull coach – ninth
- 2006 World Rowing Championships – men's eight coach – fourth
- 2006 World Rowing Championships – men's coxless four coach – fifteenth
- 2007 World Rowing Championships – men's eight coach – seventh
- 2007 World Rowing Championships – men's coxless four co-coach – twelfth
- 2007 World Rowing Championships – men's coxed pair co-coach – fourth

=== National Interstate Regatta ===
- 1985 – Interstate Men's Eight Championship (VIC) coach – first
- 1986 – Interstate Men's Eight Championship (VIC) coach - first
- 1987 – Interstate Men's Eight Championship (VIC) co-coach - first
- 1988 – Interstate Men's Eight Championship (VIC) co-coach – first
- 1989 – Interstate Men's Eight Challenge (VIC) coach – first
- 1990 – Interstate Men's Sculling Championship (VIC) coach - second
- 1991 – Interstate Men's Sculling Championship (VIC) coach - first
- 1992 – Interstate Men's Sculling Championship (VIC) coach - second
- 1993 – Interstate Men's Eight Championship (VIC) co-coach – first
- 1993 – Interstate Men's Sculling Championship (VIC) co-coach - fourth
- 2008 – Interstate Men's Eight Championship co-coach (NSW) – first

=== National head coaching roles ===
- 1993-1996 – Canada Head coach
- 1997-2000 – Australia Head coach
- 2001-2004 – Canada Head coach
- 2005-2008 – Australia men's and AIS Head Coach
