= Peter Shakespear =

Australian rower

Personal information
- Nationality: Australian
- Born: 27 September 1946 (age 78); Perth, Western Australia

Sport
- Sport: Rowing

Peter Shakespear (born 27 September 1946) is an Australian rower. He competed at the 1972 Summer Olympics and the 1976 Summer Olympics. Shakespear is married to Wilma Shakespear, a former Australia netball international, netball coach and sports administrator.
