= Aldona (given name) =

- Gender: Female
- Name day: 22 May

Origin
- Region of origin: Lithuania, Poland

Aldona is a Lithuanian and Polish feminine given name. Notable people with the name include:

- Aldona of Lithuania (1333–1339), Queen consort of Poland, princess of the Grand Duchy of Lithuania
- Aldona Čiukšytė (born 1944), Lithuanian rower
- Aldona Jonaitis, American anthropologist
- Aldona Klimavičiūtė (born 1940), Lithuanian rower
- Aldona Margenytė, Lithuanian rower
- Aldona Marciniak (born 1984), Polish sports journalist and broadcaster
- Aldona Młyńczak (born 1958), Polish politician
- Aldona Nenėnienė (born 1949), Lithuanian handball player
- Aldona Niemczyk (born 1969), German politician
- Aldona Wos (born 1955), Polish-American politician
