= Genovaitė =

Genovaitė (short form Genutė or Genė) is a Lithuanian given name that may refer to:

- Genė Galinytė (born 1945), Lithuanian rower
- Genovaitė Ramoškienė (born 1945), Lithuanian rower
- Genovaitė Strigaitė (born 1942), Lithuanian rower
