= Ingrid Falk =

Ingrid Falk may refer to:

- Ingrid Falk (artist) (born 1960), Swedish painter and installation artist
- Ingrid Falk (rower), German rower
