= 1963 European Rowing Championships =

1963 European Rowing Championships may refer to:

- 1963 European Rowing Championships (men), the competition for men held in Copenhagen, Denmark
- 1963 European Rowing Championships (women), the competition for women held in Khimki near Moscow in the Soviet Union
