= Galina Mitrokhina =

Galina Mitrokhina may refer to

- Galina Mitrokhina (rower) (born 1940), Russian rower
- Galina Mitrokhina (track athlete) (born 1944), Russian track and field athlete
