= Grishchenkov =

Grishchenkov (masculine, Russian: Грищенков) or Grishchenkova (feminine, Russian: Грищенкова) is a Russian surname. Notable people with the surname include:

- Alla Grishchenkova (born 1961), Russian Soviet swimmer
- Nina Grishchenkova, Russian rower
- Vasiliy Grishchenkov (born 1958), Russian Soviet triple jumper

== See also ==
- Grishchenko
