= Klimov (disambiguation) =

Klimov is a Soviet aircraft engine design bureau. It may also refer to:

- Klimov (surname)
- Klimov Bluff in Antarctica
