= Klimov (surname) =

Klimov (masculine, Russian: Климов) or Klimova (feminine, Russian: Климова) is a Russian surname. Notable people with the surname include:

- Aleksandra Klimova (1921–2005), Russian/Soviet actress
- Alexei Klimov (born 1975), Russian sport shooter
- Anastasia Klimova (born 1994), Ukrainian footballer
- Andrey Klimov (disambiguation) several people
- Dmitri Klimov (born 1983), Russian soccer coach and former player
- Ekaterina Klimova (born 1978), Russian actress
- Elem Klimov (1933–2003), Soviet–Russian filmmaker
- Fedor Klimov (born 1990), Russian pair skater
- Galina Klimova (born 1942), Russian rower
- Georgy Klimov (1928–1997), Russian linguist
- Igor Klimov (born 1989), Russian soccer player
- Ivan Klimov (1903–1991), Soviet military leader
- Leonid Klimov (born 1953), Ukrainian banker, parliamentarian, and politician
- Marina Klimova (born 1966), Russian ice dancer
- Marusya Klimova (born 1962), Russian writer
- Natalya Klimova (born 1951), Ukrainian basketball player
- Oksana Klimova (born 1992), Russian ice dancer
- Rita Klímová (1931–1993), Czech economist and politician
- Sergey Klimov (canoeist) (born 1935), Soviet sprint canoer
- Sergey Alexandrovich Klimov (born 1980), Russian racing cyclist
- Valery Klimov (violinist) (1931–2022), Soviet violinist
- Valeri Klimov (footballer) (born 1974), Russian soccer coach and former player
- Valeri Klimov (ice hockey) (born 1986), Russian ice hockey player
- Vladimir Klimov, Soviet sprint canoer
- Vladimir Yakovlevich Klimov (1892-1962), Soviet aero-engine designer
- Yevgeni Klimov (born 1985), Kazakh–Russian soccer player
- Yury Klimov (1940–2022), Soviet–Russian handball player
