= Aldona (disambiguation) =

Aldona may refer to:

- Aldona, a feminine given name
- Aldona, a village in India
- I Lituani, an opera by Amilcare Ponchielli later performed as Aldona
- Aldona (fungus), a genus of fungi in the family Parmulariaceae
