= Stanislava Bubulytė =

Retired Lithuanian rower (1945–present)

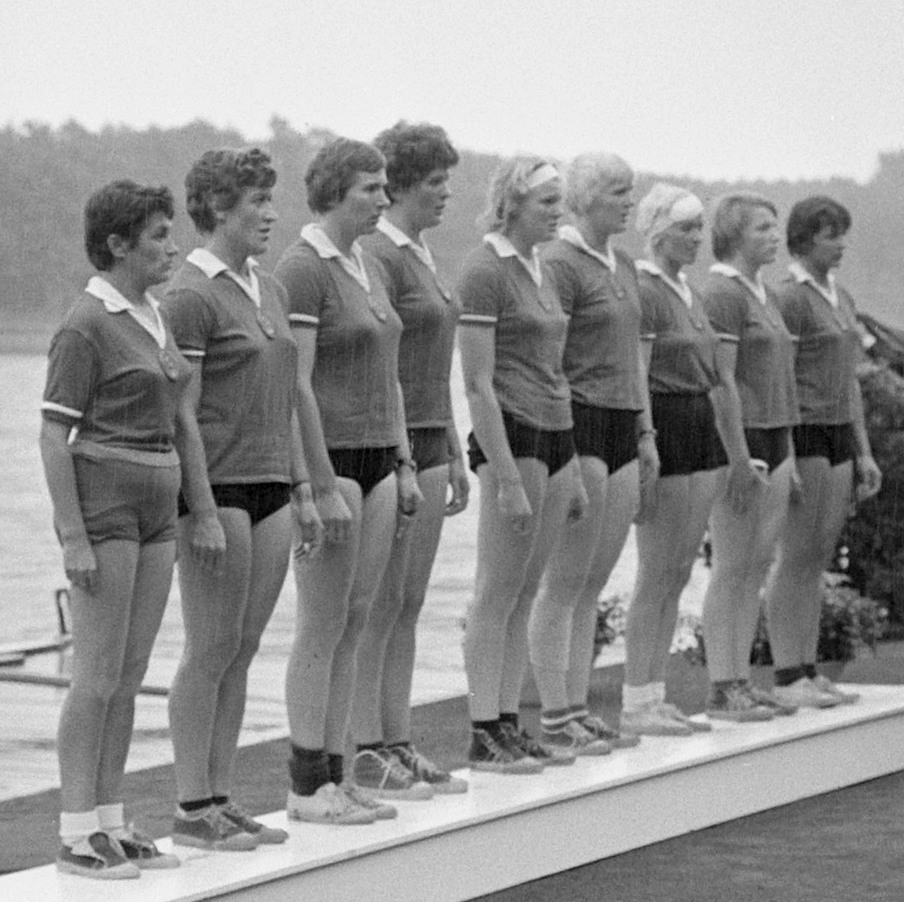
- Soviet eight at the 1965 European Championships, Bubulytė is 2nd from right

Personal information
- Born: 5 May 1945 (age 81) Pašiškės, Lithuania

Sport
- Sport: Rowing
Medal record
Representing the Soviet Union
European Rowing Championships
Gold medal – first place	1963 Moscow	Eight
Silver medal – second place	1964 Amsterdam	Eight
Gold medal – first place	1965 Duisburg	Eight
Silver medal – second place	1966 Amsterdam	Eight

Stanislava "Stasė" Bubulytė (born 5 May 1945) is a retired Lithuanian rower who won two gold and two silver medals in the eights event at the European Championships of 1963–1966. After graduating from the Vilnius University, she worked as mechanical engineer and designer in Vilnius (1969–1999), and later at Sigma tools (1999–2003).
