= Alla Alekseyeva =

Russian rower (born 1934)

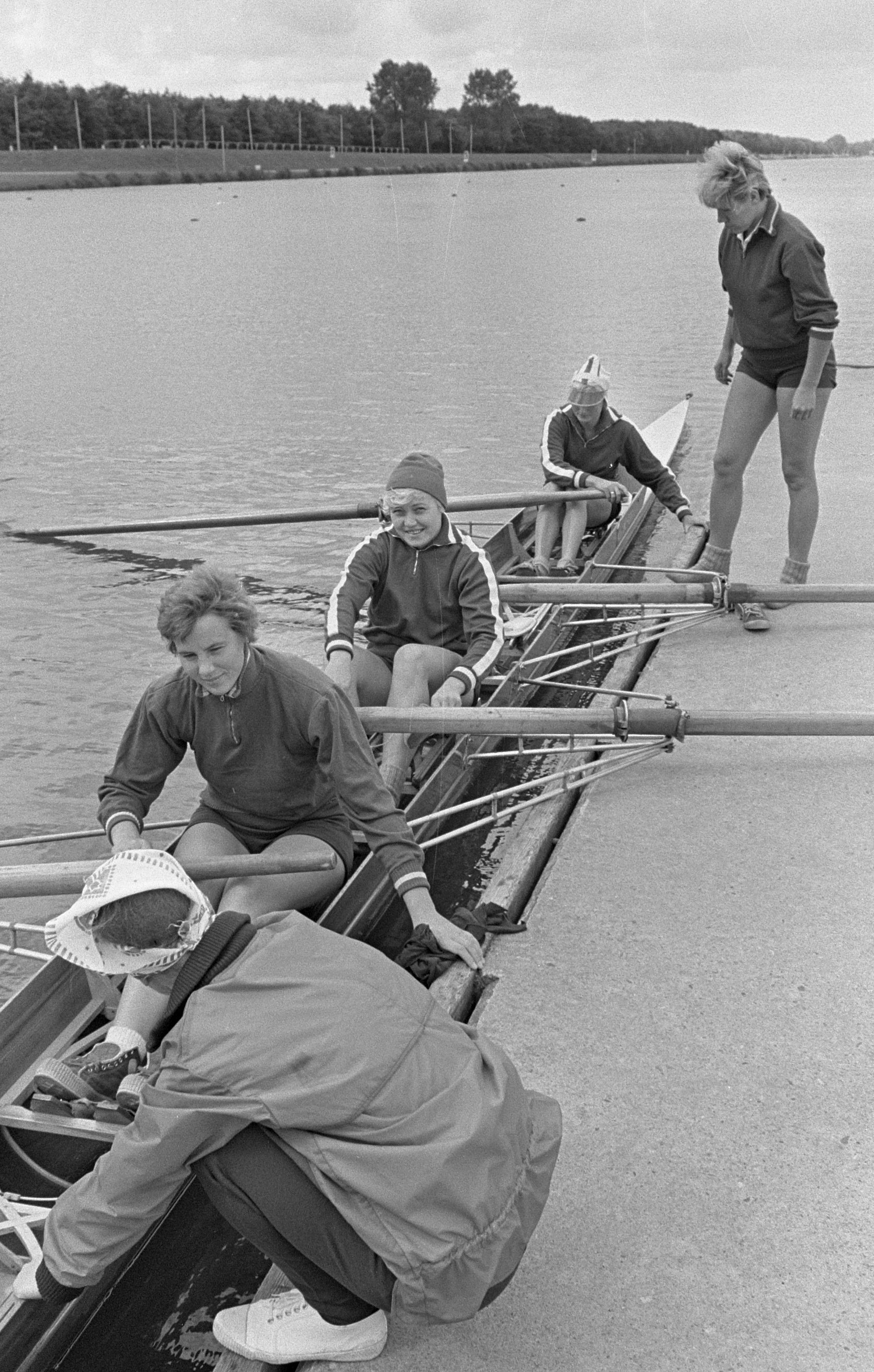
- Soviet coxed four at the 1966 European Championships, Alekseyeva is likely in the center

Personal information
- Born: 7 December 1934 (age 91) Moscow, Russia
- Education: Moscow State University

Sport
- Sport: Rowing
- Club: Dynamo
Medal record
Representing the Soviet Union
European Rowing Championships
Gold medal – first place	1966 Amsterdam	Coxed four

Alla Aleksandrovna Alekseyeva (Russian: Алла Александровна Алексеева, born 7 December 1934) is a retired Russian rower who won a European title in the coxed fours in 1966. She graduated from the Moscow State University and after retiring from competitions worked as editor.
