= Genovaitė Strigaitė =

Lithuanian rower

Personal information
- Born: 28 May 1942 (age 84) Vytautai, Lithuania

Sport
- Sport: Rowing
Medal record
Representing the Soviet Union
European Rowing Championships
Gold medal – first place	1963 Moscow	Eight
Silver medal – second place	1964 Amsterdam	Eight

Genovaitė Ona Strigaitė (later Jagelavičienė, born 28 May 1942) is a retired Lithuanian rower who won one gold and one silver medal in the eights event at the European Championships of 1963–1964.

Between 1948 and 1958 Strigaitė and her family lived in exile in Siberia. In 1965 she graduated from the Vilnius University with a degree in physics and mathematics. In 1963–1965 she worked as a rowing coach, between 1966 and 1992 as a technician at the Vilnius Radio, and in 1992–2008 as a welfare functionary at the Vilnius City Office. Her husband Juozas Jagelavičius was also an international rower.
