= Maija Kaufmane =

Latvian rower

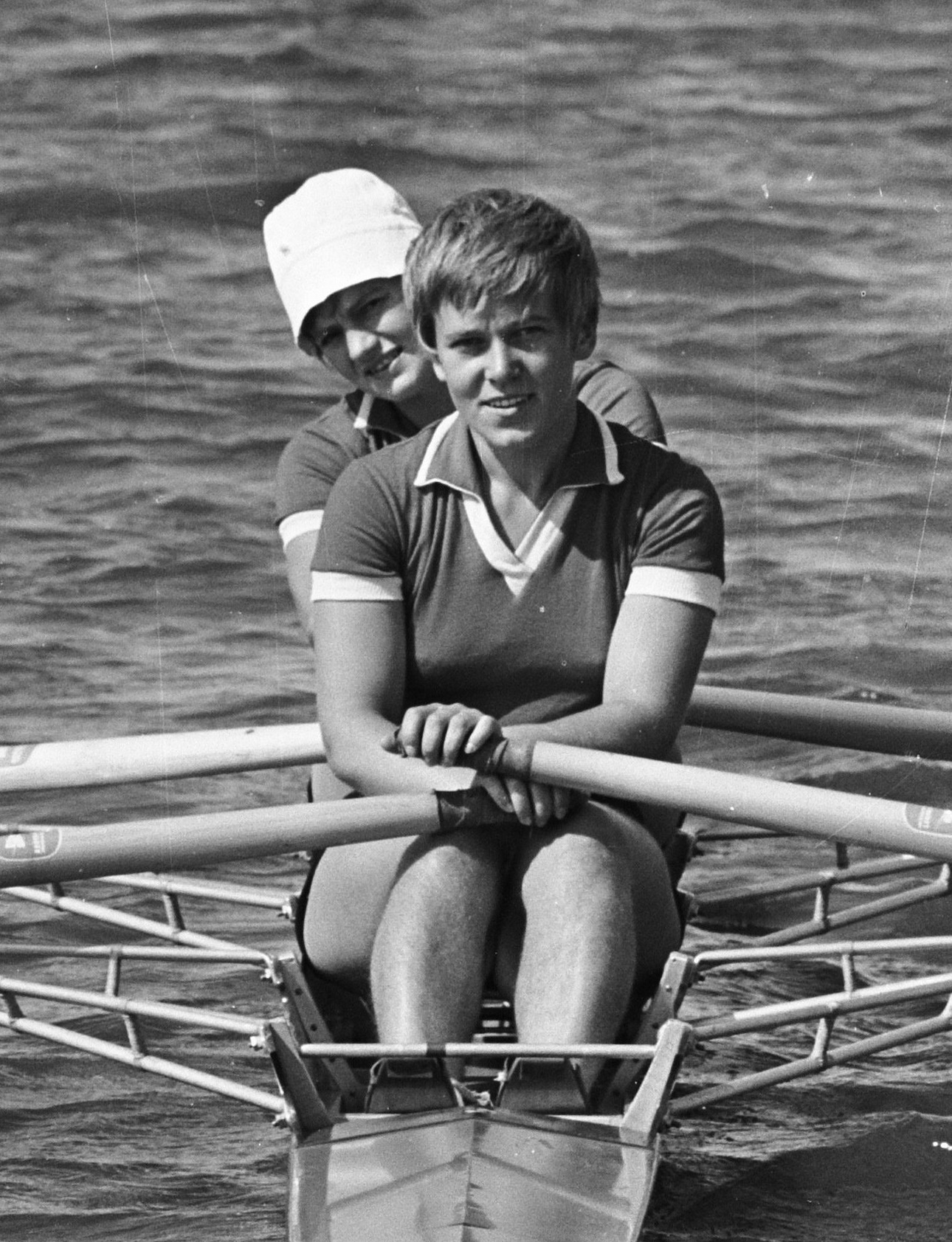
- Maija Kaufmane (front) and Daina Šveica in 1964

Personal information
- Born: 7 May 1941 (age 85) Riga, Latvia

Sport
- Sport: Rowing
- Club: Dynamo Riga
Medal record
Representing the Soviet Union
European Rowing Championships
Gold medal – first place	1963 Moscow	Double sculls
Gold medal – first place	1964 Amsterdam	Double sculls
Gold medal – first place	1965 Duisburg	Double sculls

Maija Kaufmane (née Pumpura on 7 May 1941, Russian: Майя Вольдемаровна Кауфмане-Пампура) is a retired Latvian rower. Together with Daina Šveica she won three consecutive European titles in the double sculls in 1963–1965.
