= Thomas Keller (rower) =

Swiss rower and sports administrator

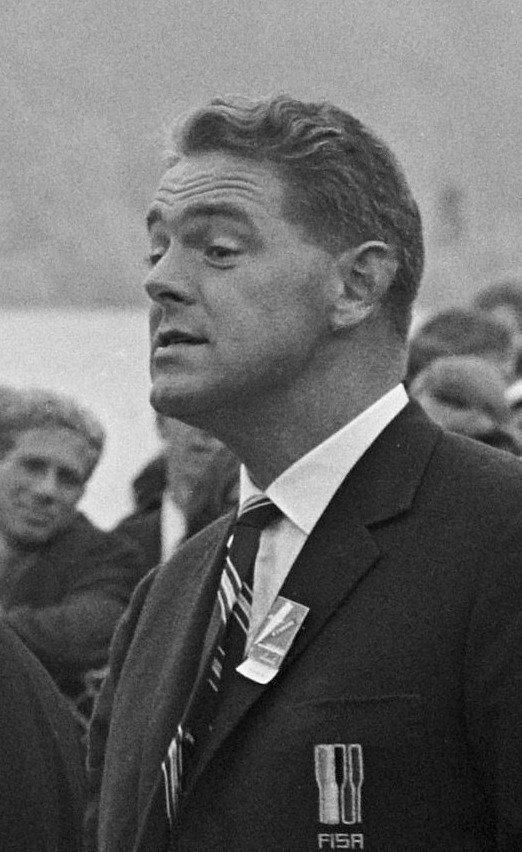
- Thomas Keller at the 1965 European Championships

Personal information
- Born: 24 December 1924
- Died: 28 September 1989 (aged 64) Monte Carlo, Monaco

Sport
- Sport: Rowing
- Club: Grasshopper Club Zuerich
Medal record
Representing Switzerland
European Rowing Championships
Bronze medal – third place	1950 Milan	Single sculls

Thomas Keller also known as Thomi Keller (24 December 1924 – 28 September 1989) was the president of Féderation Internationale des Sociétés d'Aviron (FISA), the governing body of international rowing, from 1958 until his death in 1989, and president of the General Association of International Sports Federations from 1969 to 1987. He was also a qualified chemical engineer and president of Swiss Timing, a company specialising in sports chronometry which is now part of the Swatch group.

As a student, Keller was a member of the Swiss university teams for Nordic combined skiing and for ski-jumping. However, in rowing, he was not only a champion sculler at Swiss national level, but won the bronze medal in single sculls at the 1950 European Rowing Championships.

Keller was chosen to row at the 1956 Summer Olympics in Melbourne, but did not do so as his national Olympic Committee chose to boycott the games in protest at the Soviet Union's invasion of Hungary (see 1956 Hungarian Revolution). Two years later, he became president of FISA, following the death of the previous president, Gaston Mullegg. At 34, he was one of the youngest presidents of an international sports federation ever to be elected. Keller always aimed to give priority to athletes' interests, and consistently aimed to minimize the influence of politics on sport.

The Thomas Keller Medal is named after him. It is presented by FISA to recently retired rowers who had had an outstanding international career.

Thomas Keller was married to Dorry Bodmer of Zurich, Switzerland. They had five children: Dominik, Adrian, Bettina, Anne and Barbara Keller.
