= Jūratė Narvidaite =

Lithuanian rowing coxswain

Sport
- Sport: Rowing
Medal record
Representing the Soviet Union
European Rowing Championships
Silver medal – second place	1966 Amsterdam	Eights
Gold medal – first place	1967 Vichy	Eights

Jūratė Narvidaite is a retired Lithuanian rowing coxswain who won a silver and a gold medal in the eights event at the European championships of 1966–1967.
