= 1965 European Rowing Championships =

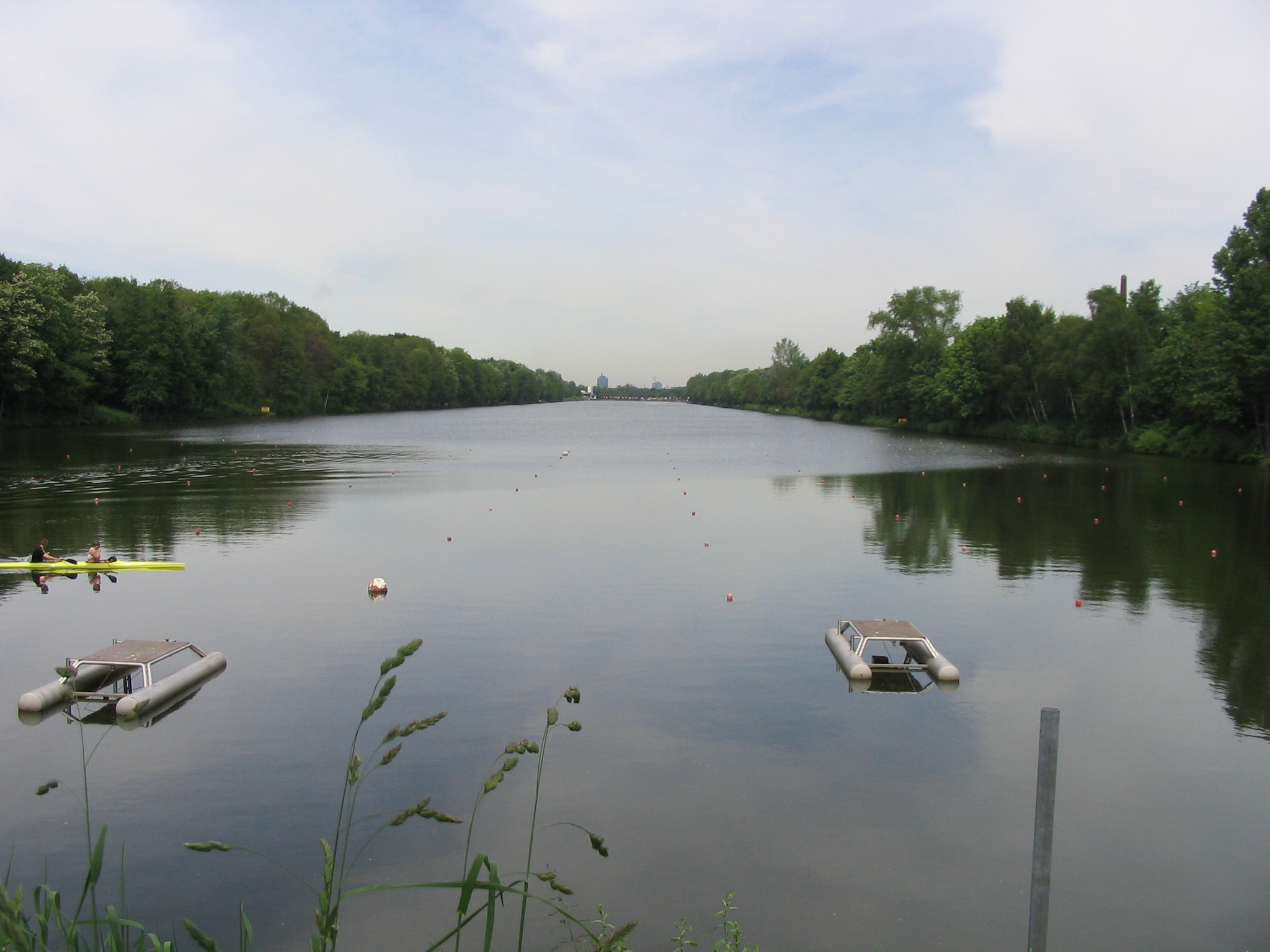
- View along the Wedau regatta course
- Venue: Wedau
- Location: Duisburg, West Germany
- Dates: 20–22 August 1965 (women); 26–29 August 1965 (men)

The 1965 European Rowing Championships were rowing championships held on the Wedau regatta course in the West German city of Duisburg. This edition of the European Rowing Championships was held from 20 to 22 August for women, and from 26 to 29 August for men. Women entered in five boat classes (W1x, W2x, W4x+, W4+, W8+), and 12 countries sent 36 boats. Men competed in all seven Olympic boat classes (M1x, M2x, M2-, M2+, M4-, M4+, M8+), and 22 countries sent 89 boats. East German crews did not attend the championships.

== German participation ==
FISA, the International Rowing Federation, did not recognise East Germany as a country and insisted on one German team per boat class. In June 1965, the East German rowing federation made an application to the world governing body to be recognised as an independent state; this was the seventh time that they had applied for independence. There was insufficient time to discuss the issue at the congress held in Duisburg just before the men's competition, but FISA president Thomas Keller said that an extraordinary congress to be held in November in Vienna would discuss the issue, and that he personally saw no problem with solving the problems.

East German teams did not compete at these championships. Helena Smalman-Smith, who maintains a website on English women's rowing, puts forward three theories about their absence: there was "the possibility of defection from an event in West Germany", "not wanting the athletes to see how much more prosperous the western part of their country" had become, and putting pressure on FISA to change their stance on a combined German team.

== Medal summary – women's events ==
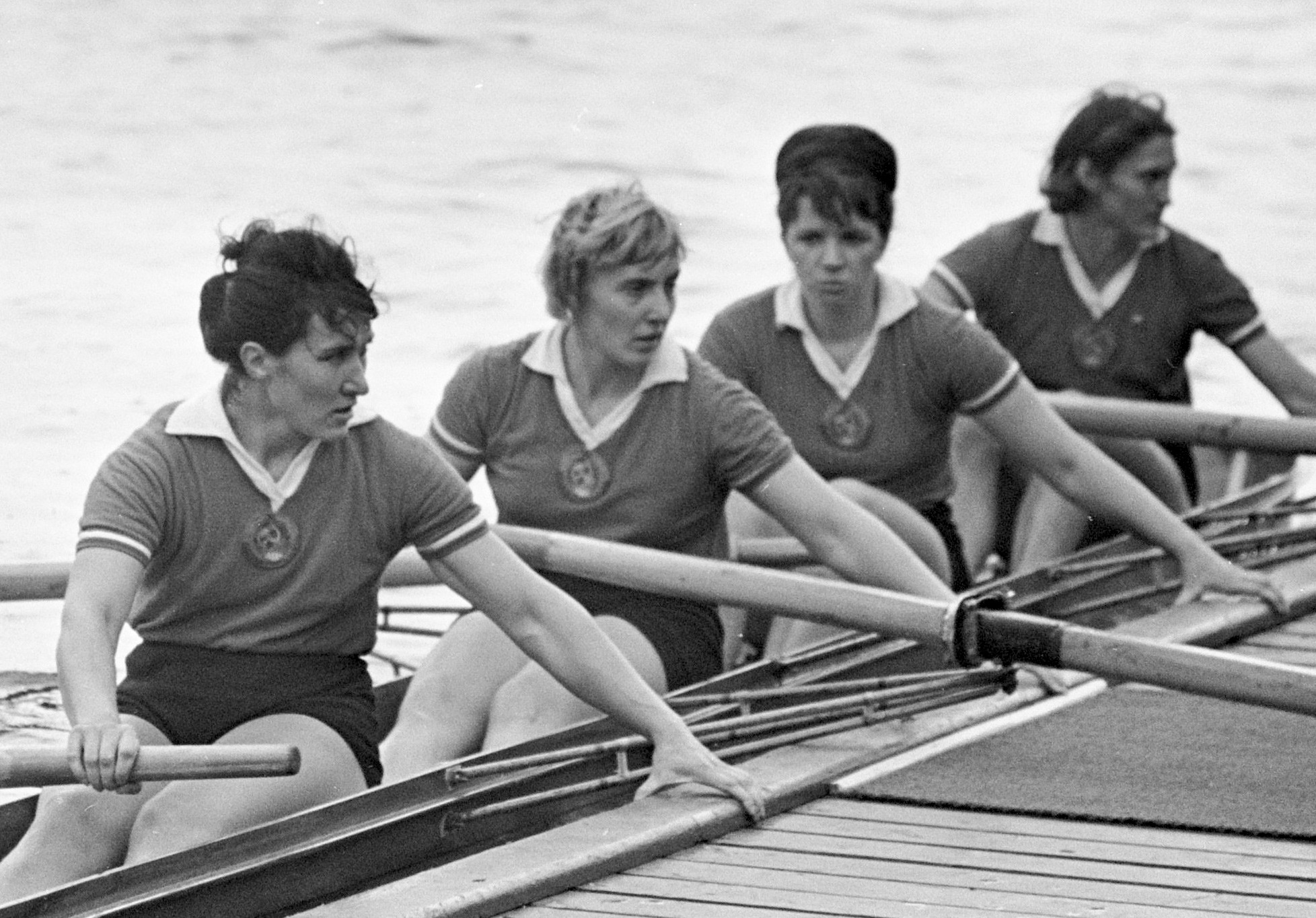
The Soviet women's coxed four won gold

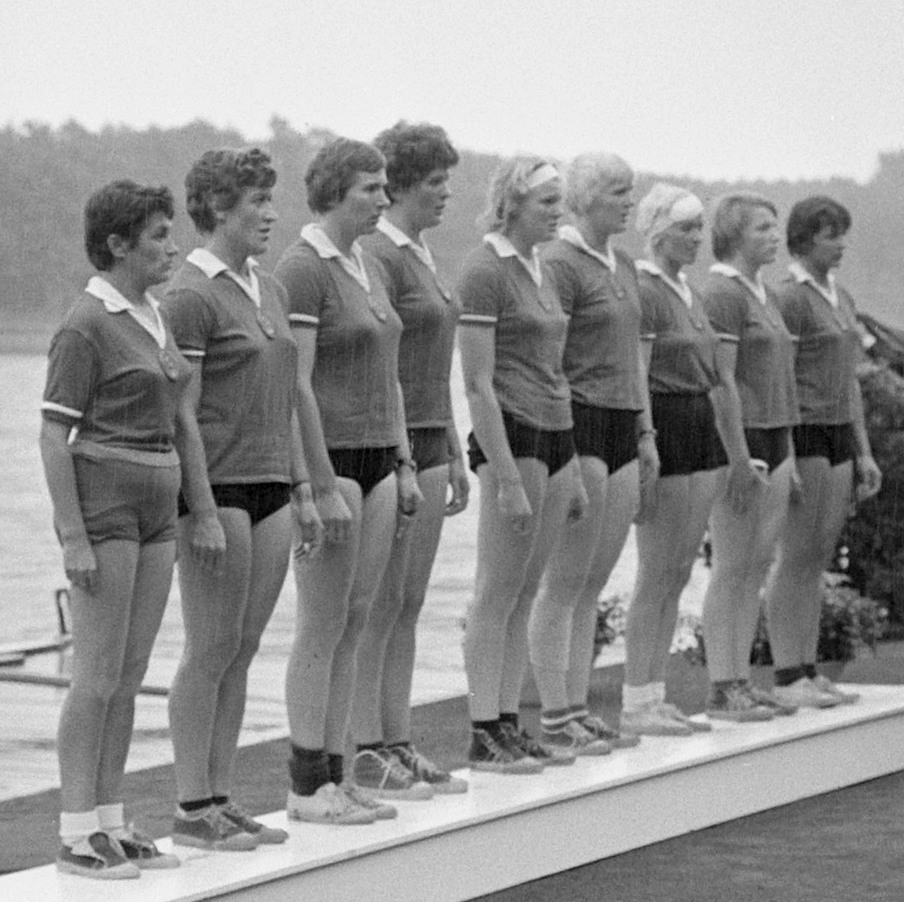
Unlike the previous year, the Soviet women's eight won the premier event

The finals for the women were held on 22 August.

Event	Gold		Silver		Bronze	
Event	Country & rowers	Time	Country & rowers	Time	Country & rowers	Time
W1x	Soviet Union; Galina Konstantinova		France; Renée Camu		Hungary; Anna Domonkos	
W2x	Soviet Union; Maya Kaufmane; Daina Svejc-Mellenberg		Czechoslovakia; Alena Postlová; Magdalena Sarbochova		Hungary; Annemarie Rupprecht; Christl Schmidt-Lehnert	
W4+	Soviet Union; Galina Selifanova; Natalya Maximova; Larissa Petruchik; Valentina Skworkova; Valentina Turkova (cox)		Romania; Ana Tamas; Florica Ghiuzelea; Doina Balasa; Emilia Rigard; Stefania Borisov (cox)		Czechoslovakia; Marta Springlova; Jarmila Komilouskova; Venceslava Michalova; Julie Sucha; Vera Kalousova (cox)	
W4x+	Hungary; Maria Pekanovits; Zsuzsa Szappanos; Agnes Salamon; Maria Fekete; Margit Komornik (cox)		Soviet Union; Aino Milodan; Nelli Chernova; Raissa Korotajewa; Vera Alexeyeva; Tamara Grony (cox)		Czechoslovakia; Eva Krybusova; Svetla Hudeckova; Jaroslava Jezkova; Vera Hajkova; Vera Dusakova (cox)	
W8+	Soviet Union; Alla Pervorukova; Irena Bačiulytė; Sofija Korkutytė; Leokadija Semashko; Aldona Margenytė; Aldona Čiukšytė; Stanislava Bubulytė; Rita Tamašauskaitė; Nina Grishchenkova (cox)		Netherlands; Willemina Bernelot-Moens; Joke Huisman; Geertruida Cornelese; Gerharda Tuitert; A. Meinardi; A.E.H. Stoffels; A.J.E. de Boer; Johanna Bosch; W. de Jongh (cox)		Romania; Maria Forsea; Maria Hublea; Viorica Jiva; Stefania Ionescu; Lucia Ganescu; Iuliana Bulugioiu; Florica Ghiuzelea; Mariana Limpede; Stefania Borisov (cox)	

== Medal summary – men's events ==
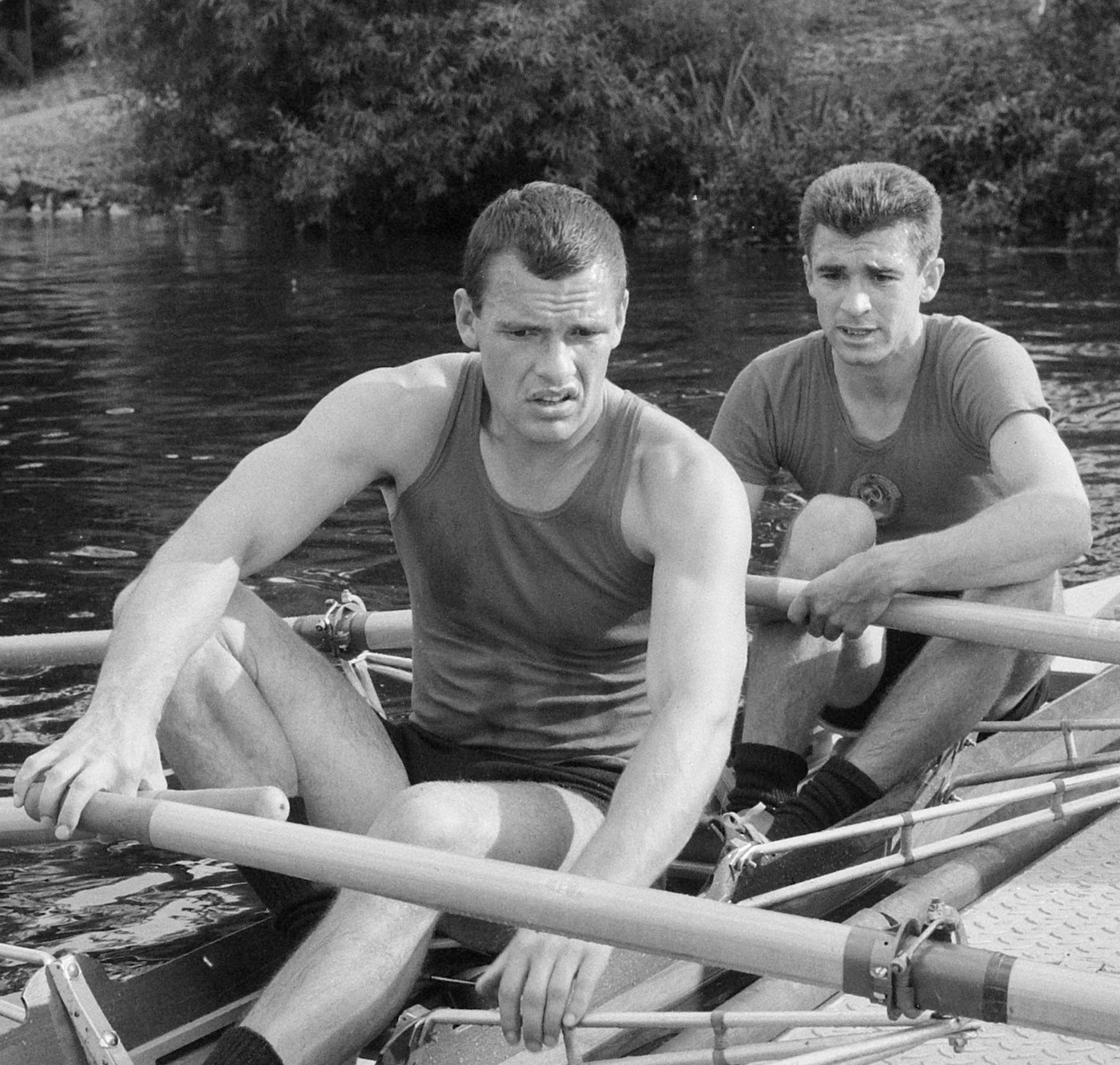
Tyurin and Dubrovskiy won silver in the double sculls

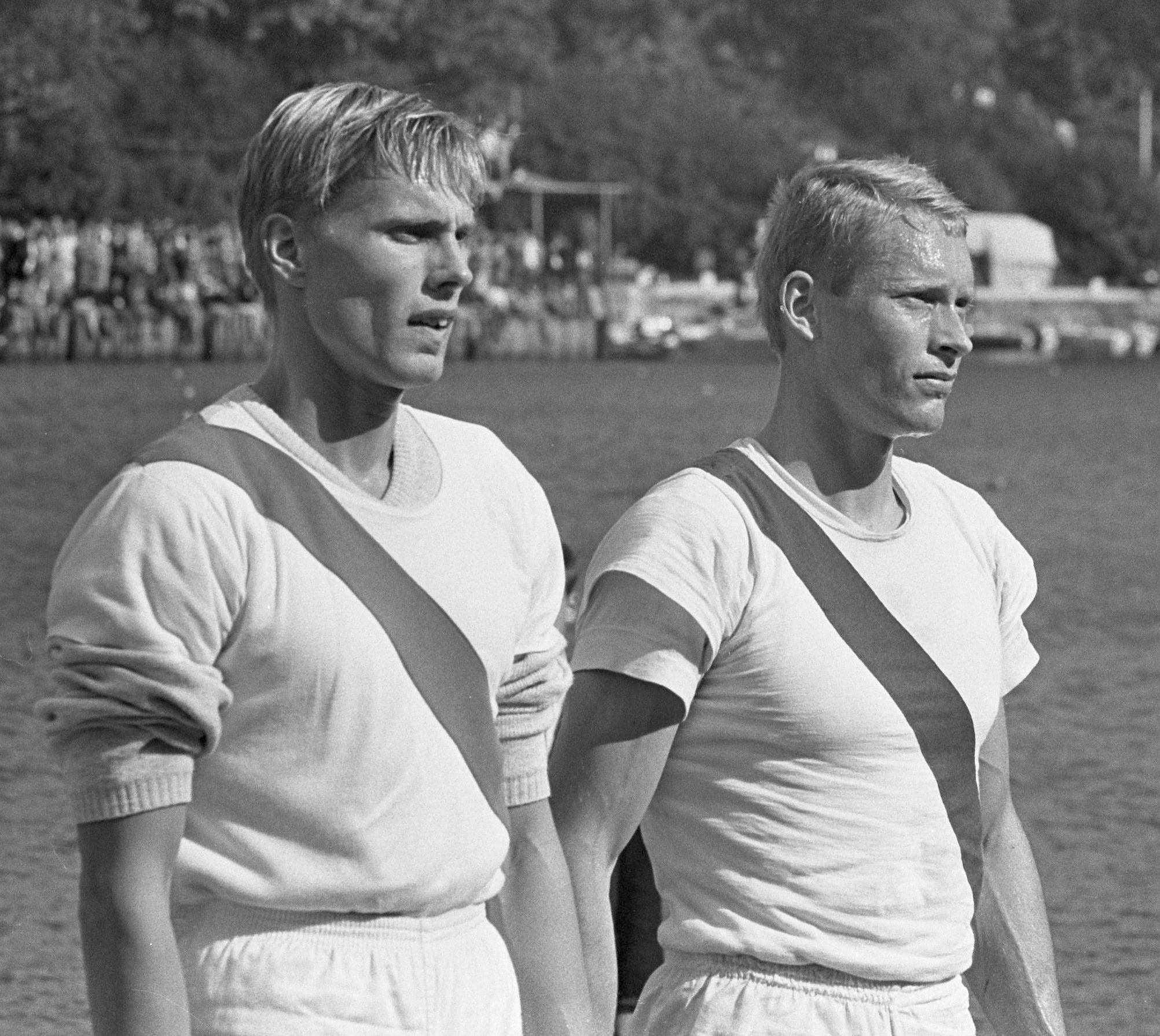
Christiansen and Boye won gold in the pair for Denmark

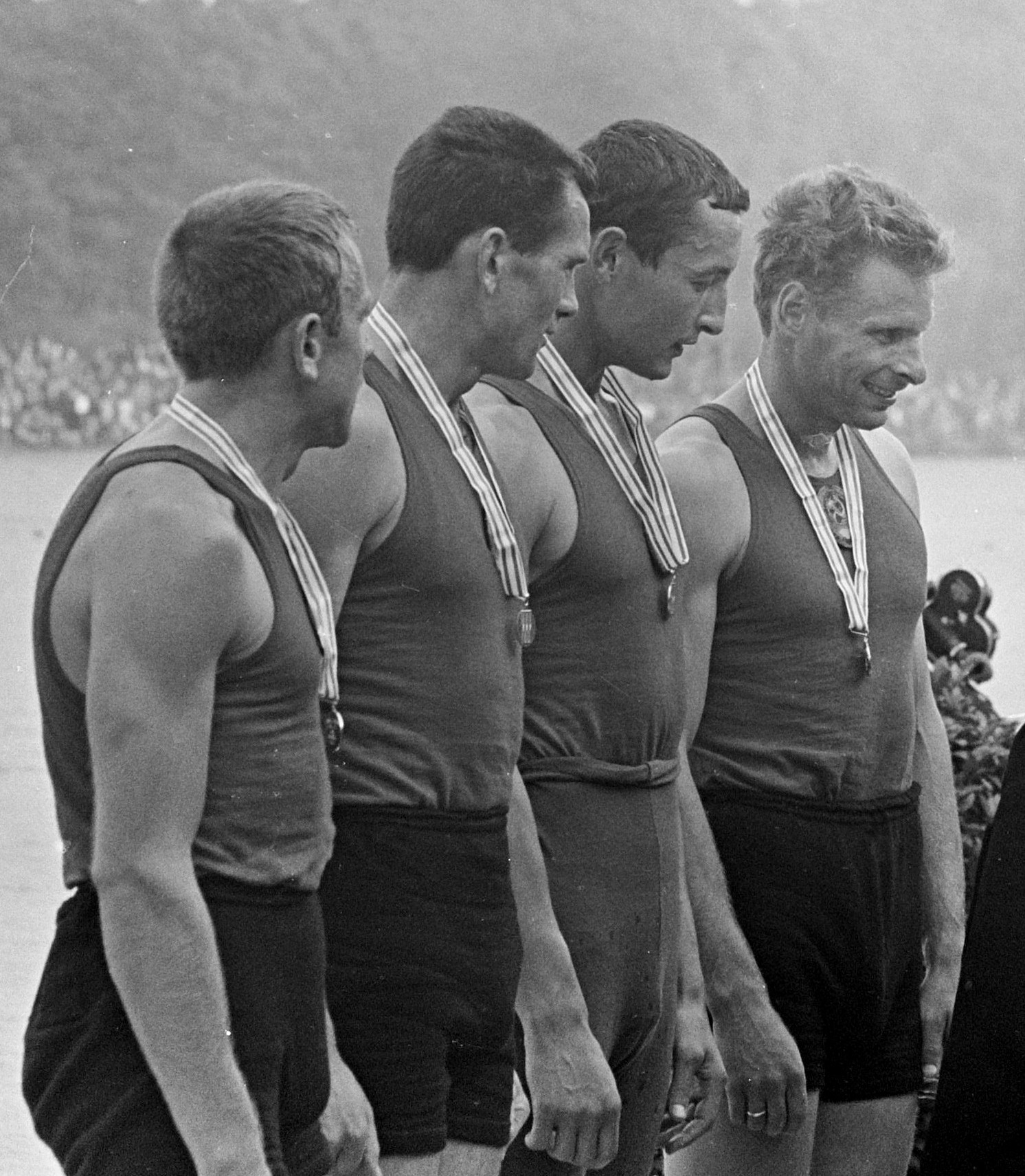
The Soviet four won gold

The regatta for men was held from 26 to 29 August. The Soviet Union was the only country to have boats in all finals.

Event	Gold		Silver		Bronze	
Event	Country & rowers	Time	Country & rowers	Time	Country & rowers	Time
M1x	West Germany; Jochen Meißner	7:42.10	Soviet Union; Anatoliy Sass	7:43.35	Netherlands; Jan Wienese	7:45.59
M2x	Switzerland; Melchior Bürgin; Martin Studach	7:06.42	Soviet Union; Oleg Tyurin; Boris Dubrovskiy	7:08.83	Czechoslovakia; Jaroslav Hellebrand; Petr Krátký	7:11.02
M2-	Denmark; Peter Christiansen; Hans Jørgen Boye	7:29.32	Austria; Dieter Losert; Dieter Ebner	7:34.21	Soviet Union; Anatoli Fedorov; Yury Suslin	7:36.55
M2+	Soviet Union; Leonid Rakovshchik; Nikolay Safronov; Igor Rudakov (cox)	7:54.63	Italy; Primo Baran; Renzo Sambo; Giorgio Conte (cox)	7:56.79	Netherlands; Lex Winter; Hadriaan van Nes; Roderick Rijnders (cox)	7:58,11
M4-	Soviet Union; Volodymyr Sterlik; Antanas Bagdonavičius; Zigmas Jukna; Juozas Jagelavičius	6:50.99	West Germany; Detlef Damboldt; Wolfgang Hottenrott; Michael Schwan; Lutz Ulbricht	6:58.14	Switzerland; Nicolas Gobet; Peter Bolliger; Walter Weiersmüller; Adriano Bosshard	7:00.51
M4+	Soviet Union; Vladimir Yevseyev; Anatoly Tkachuk; Boris Kuzmin; Vitaly Kurdchenko; Anatoly Luzgin (cox)	7:05.18	West Germany; Peter Kuhn; Peter Hertel; Ulrich Luhn; Rüdiger Henning; Uwe Trompler (cox)	7:08.13	Czechoslovakia; Jan Štefan; Jaroslav Starosta; Otakar Mareček; Václav Kozák; Arnošt Poisl (cox)	7:10.00
M8+	West Germany; Klaus Aeffke; Hans-Jürgen Wallbrecht; Jürgen Schröder; Dagobert Thometschek; Klaus Behrens; Christian Prey; Dirk Schreyer; Horst Meyer; Peter Niehusen (cox)		Soviet Union; Yuri Alechin; Yuri Chodorov; Arkady Kudinov; Aleksandr Martyshkin; Guntis Niedra; Elmārs Rubīns; Michail Mahonov; Andris Prieditis; Viktor Mikheyev (cox)		United States; William Stowe; Fargo Thompson; Boyce Budd; John Abele; Tony Johnson; Stanley Cwiklinski; Hugh Foley; Joseph Amlong; Róbert Zimonyi (cox)	

== Medals table ==
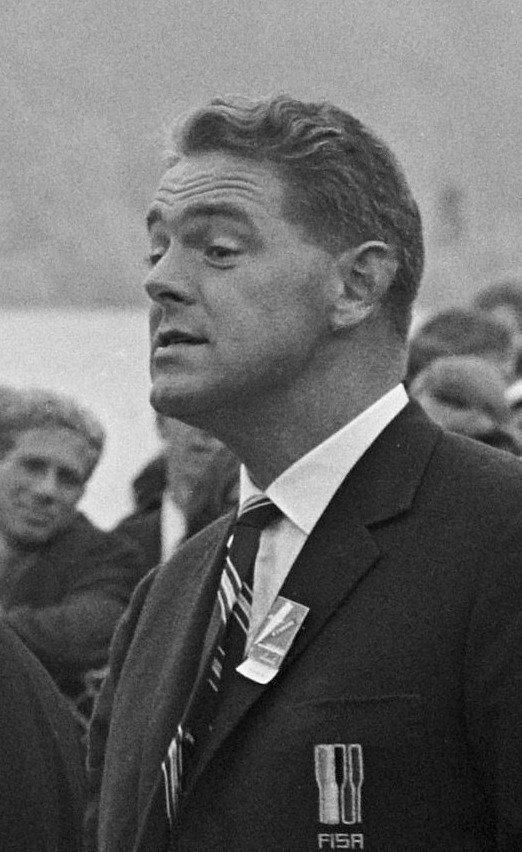
FISA president Thomas Keller presented the medals

The table shows the aggregate results for men and women. The overall winner was the Soviet Union with seven gold medals, followed by West Germany with two gold medals. The Soviet Union managed to win a medal in all 12 boat classes. A total of 12 countries won medals.

Rank	Nation	Gold	Silver	Bronze	Total
1	Soviet Union (URS)	7	4	1	12
2	West Germany (FRG)	2	2	0	4
3	Hungary (HUN)	1	0	2	3
4	Switzerland (SUI)	1	0	1	2
5	Denmark (DEN)	1	0	0	1
6	Czechoslovakia (TCH)	0	1	4	5
7	Netherlands (NED)	0	1	2	3
8	Romania (ROM)	0	1	1	2
9	Austria (AUT)	0	1	0	1
9	France (FRA)	0	1	0	1
9	Italy (ITA)	0	1	0	1
12	United States (USA)	0	0	1	1
Totals (12 entries)		12	12	12	36
