= Juozas Jagelavičius =

Lithuanian rower (1939–2000)

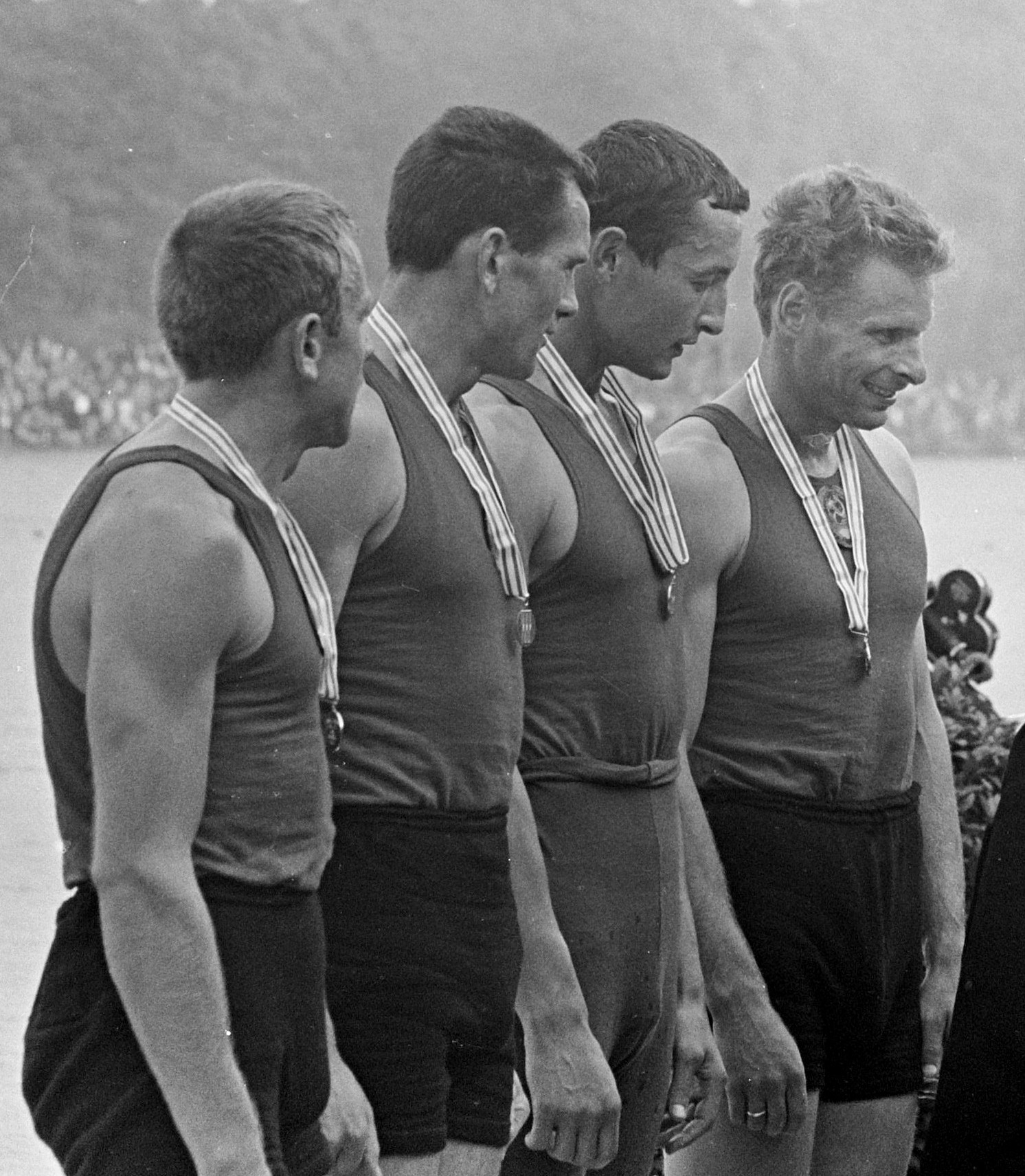
- Zigmas Jukna, Antanas Bagdonavicius, Volodymyr Sterlik and Juozas Jagelavicius – winners of the 1965 European Championships in the coxless fours

Personal information
- Born: 12 January 1939 Džiuginėnai, Lithuania
- Died: 17 June 2000 (aged 61) Vilnius, Lithuania
- Education: Vilnius Pedagogical Institute
- Height: 1.87 m (6 ft 2 in)
- Weight: 83 kg (183 lb)

Sport
- Sport: Rowing
- Club: Žalgiris Vilnius
Medal record
Olympic Games
Bronze medal – third place	1968 Mexico City	Eight
World Rowing Championships
Silver medal – second place	1962 Lucerne	Eight
Silver medal – second place	1966 Bled	Coxless four
European Rowing Championships
Gold medal – first place	1965 Duisburg	Coxless four
Gold medal – first place	1967 Vichy	Coxed four
Silver medal – second place	1963 Copenhagen	Eight
Silver medal – second place	1964 Amsterdam	Eight
Silver medal – second place	1969 Klagenfurt	Eight

Juozas Aleksandras Jagelavičius (12 January 1939 – 17 June 2000) was a Lithuanian rower. He competed for the Soviet Union at the 1964 and 1968 Summer Olympics in the eight and finished in fifth and third place, respectively. Between 1963 and 1969 he won two gold and five silver medals at European and world championships. In 1965 Jagelavičius graduated from the Vilnius Pedagogical Institute and starting from 1972 worked as a rowing coach. His wife Genovaitė Strigaitė was also an international rower.
