= Ričardas Vaitkevičius =

Lithuanian rower (1933–1996)

Personal information
- Born: 6 May 1933 Wilno, Poland (now Vilnius, Lithuania)
- Died: 3 January 1996 (aged 62) Vilnius, Lithuania
- Height: 1.74 m (5 ft 9 in)
- Weight: 72 kg (159 lb)

Sport
- Sport: Rowing
- Club: Žalgiris Vilnius, Dynamo Moscow
Medal record
Representing the Soviet Union
World Rowing Championships
Silver medal – second place	1962 Lucerne	Eight
European Rowing Championships
Silver medal – second place	1963 Copenhagen	Eight
Silver medal – second place	1964 Amsterdam	Eight

Ričardas Vaitkevičius (6 May 1933 – 3 January 1996) was a Lithuanian rower who specialized in the eights. In this event he won three silver medal at the European and world championships of 1962–1964 and finished fifth at the 1964 Summer Olympics. While competing Vaitkevičius also acted as a Soviet rowing coach at the 1964 and 1968 Olympics, and he continued coaching and referring rowing competitions until 1993. His elder brother Eugenijus (1931–2011) and wife Irena Bačiulytė were also a competitive rowers and rowing coaches.
