= Daina Šveica =

Latvian rower

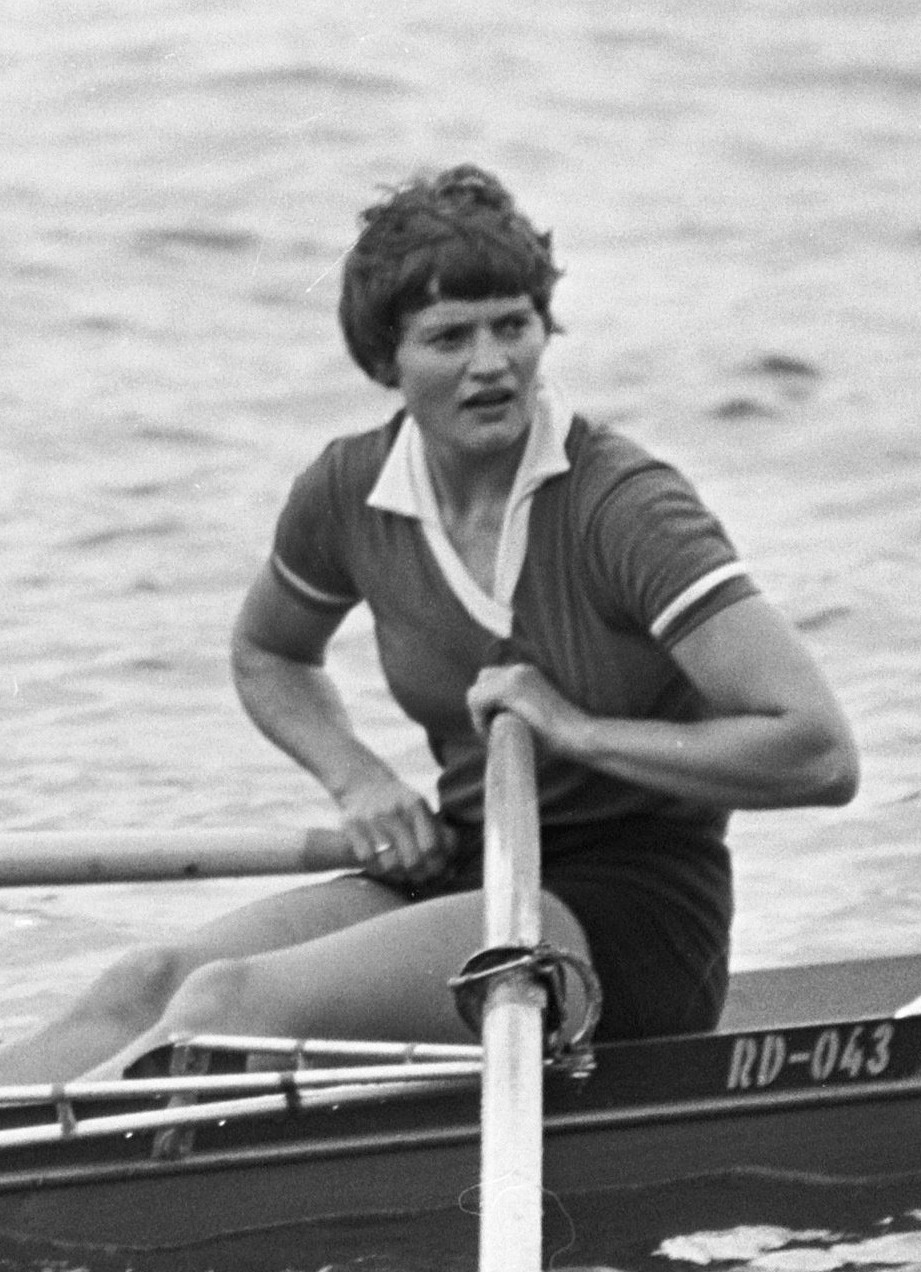
- Daina Šveica in 1965

Personal information
- Born: 28 July 1939 (age 86) Jūrmala, Latvia

Sport
- Sport: Rowing
- Club: Dynamo Riga
Medal record
Representing the Soviet Union
European Rowing Championships
Gold medal – first place	1963 Moscow	Double sculls
Gold medal – first place	1964 Amsterdam	Double sculls
Gold medal – first place	1965 Duisburg	Double sculls
Bronze medal – third place	1966 Amsterdam	Double sculls
Gold medal – first place	1967 Vichy	Double sculls

Daina Šveica (née Mellenberga, born 28 July 1939) also known as Daina Schweiz (Russian: Дайна Викторовна Швейц-Малленберга) is a retired Latvian rower who was most successful in the double sculls. In this event she won five European medals between 1963 and 1967, three gold medals with Maija Kaufmane (1963–1965) and one gold and one bronze with Tatyana Gomolko. Šveica was a member of the International Rowing Federation.
