= Irena Bačiulytė =

Lithuanian rower (1939–2024)

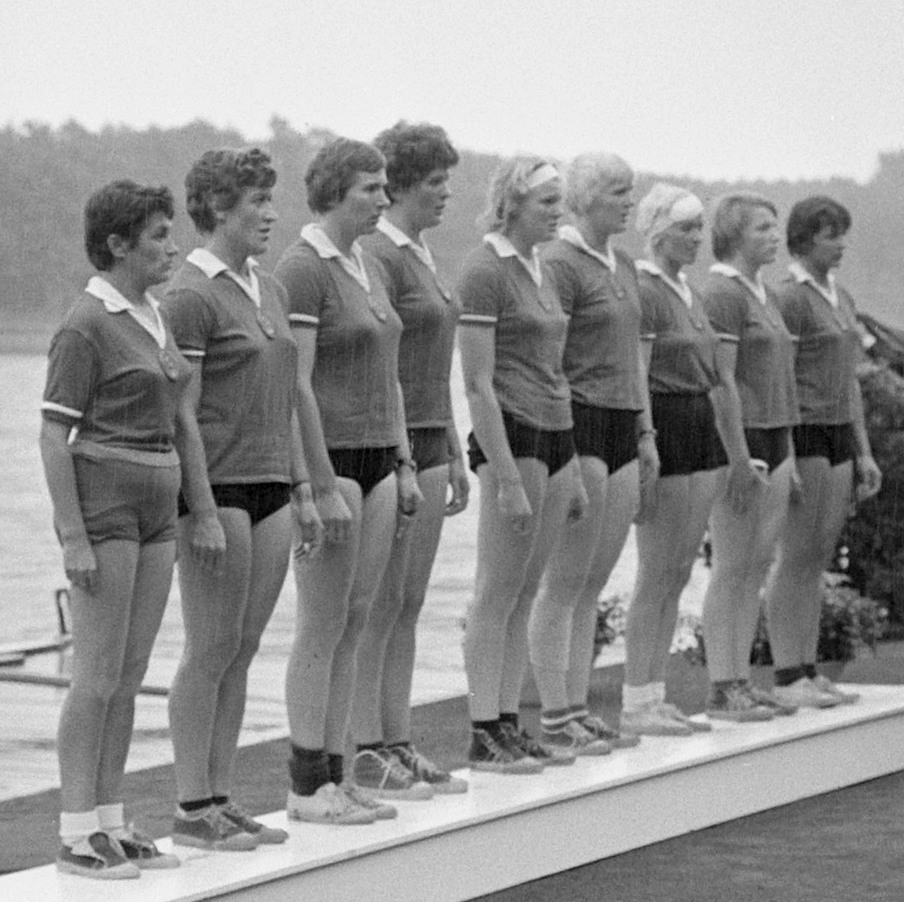
- Soviet eight at the 1965 European Championships, Bačiulytė is 3rd from left

Personal information
- Born: 8 January 1939 Kybartai, Lithuania
- Died: 28 March 2024 (aged 85) Vilnius, Lithuania

Sport
- Sport: Rowing
Medal record
Representing the Soviet Union
European Rowing Championships
| Gold medal – first place | 1963 Moscow | Eight |
| Silver medal – second place | 1964 Amsterdam | Eight |
| Gold medal – first place | 1965 Duisburg | Eight |
| Silver medal – second place | 1966 Amsterdam | Eight |
| Gold medal – first place | 1967 Vichy | Eight |

Irena Sonia Bačiulytė (later Vaitkevičienė, 8 January 1939 – 28 March 2024) was a Lithuanian rower who won three European titles in the eights event in 1963, 1965 and 1967; she finished second in 1964 and 1966. In 1962 Bačiulytė graduated from the Lithuanian University of Educational Sciences and later worked as a rowing coach in Vilnius. Her husband Ričardas Vaitkevičius was also an international rower and rowing coach. Bačiulytė died in Vilnius on 28 March 2024, at the age of 85.
