= Inge Mundt =

East German rower

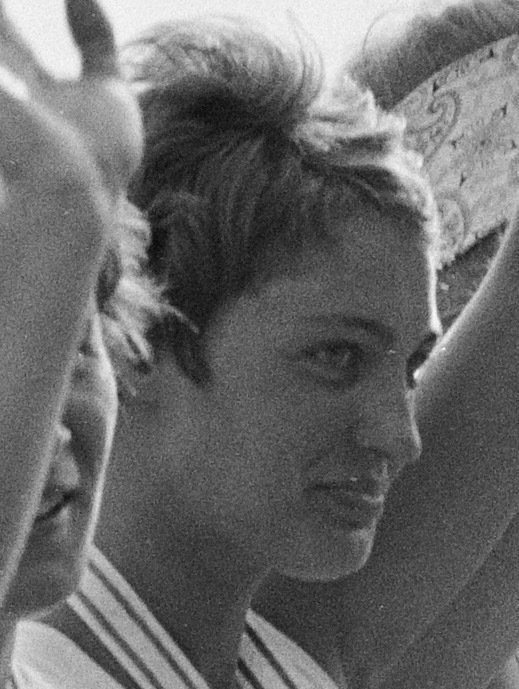
- Mundt at the 1966 European Championships

Sport
- Sport: Rowing
- Club: SC DHfK Leipzig
Medal record
Women's rowing
Representing East Germany
European Rowing Championships
Gold medal – first place	1966 Amsterdam	Eight
Silver medal – second place	1967 Vichy	Eight

Inge Mundt is a retired East German rower who won a gold and a silver medal in the eight event at the 1966 and 1967 European Rowing Championships.
