= Renée Camu =

French rower (born 1936)

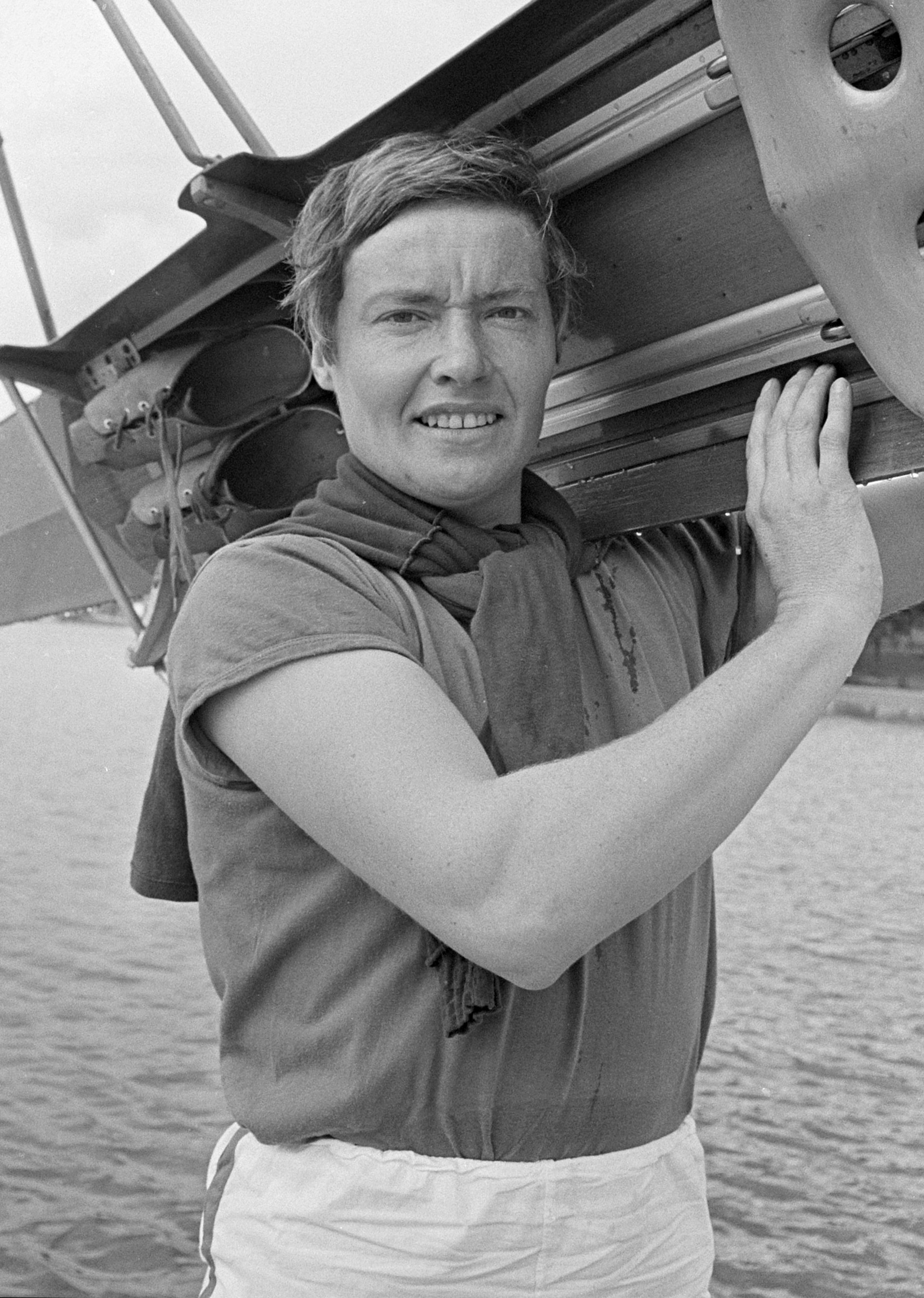
- Camu at the 1966 European Championships

Personal information
- Born: 12 March 1936 (age 90)

Sport
- Sport: Rowing
Medal record
Women's rowing
Representing France
European Rowing Championships
| Silver medal – second place | 1963 Moscow | Single sculls |
| Silver medal – second place | 1965 Duisburg | Single sculls |
| Silver medal – second place | 1968 East Berlin | Single sculls |
| Bronze medal – third place | 1972 Brandenburg | Double sculls |

Renée Camu (born 12 March 1936) is a French rower. Between 1963 and 1968 she won three silver medals in single sculls at the European championships. She then changed to double sculls and won a bronze medal in 1972, placing fourth in 1971 and sixth in 1973. She semi-retired in 1980, but in 1999 resumed competing in the masters category and won several world titles in the 2000s.
