= Natalya Zakharova =

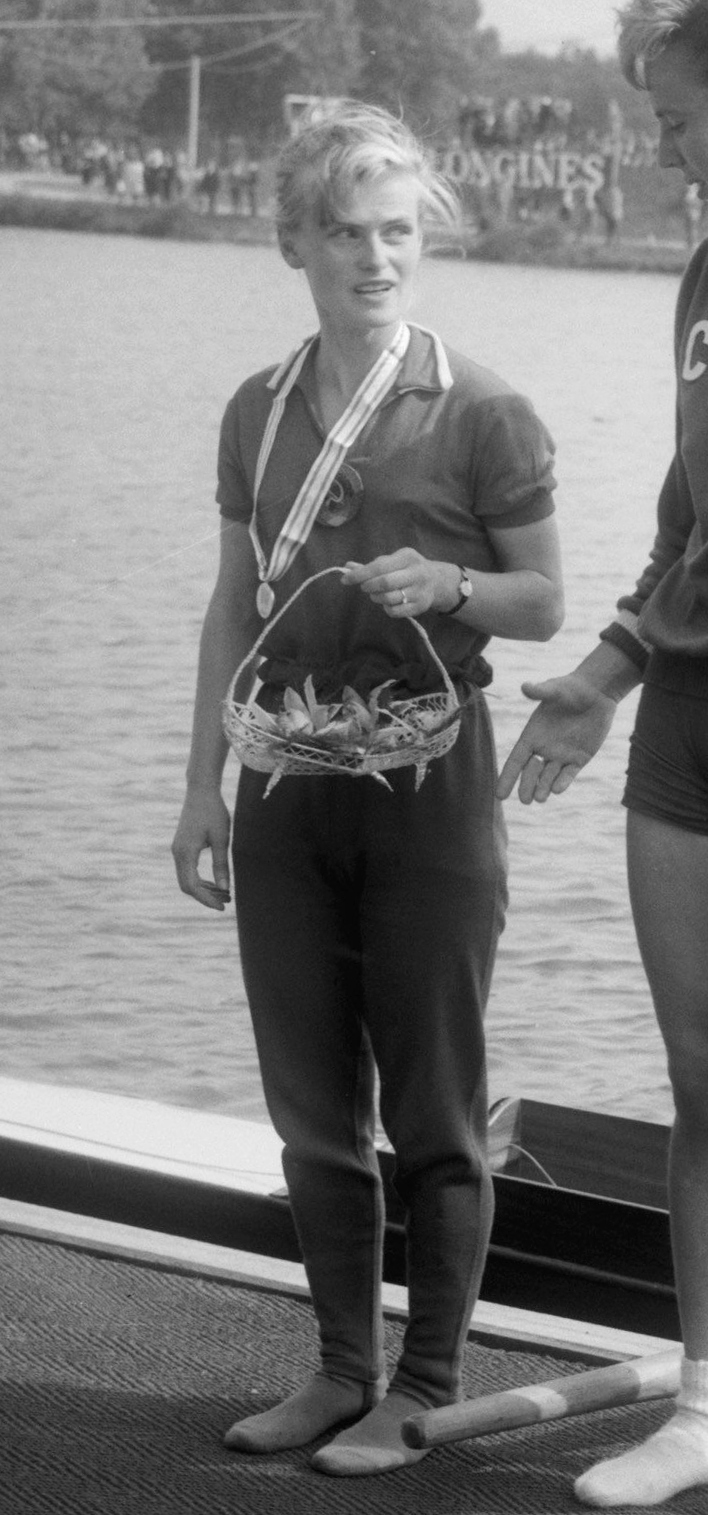
- Zakharova at the 1966 European Championships

Personal information
- Born: 1945 (age 80–81) Moscow, Russia

Sport
- Sport: Rowing
- Club: Dynamo
Medal record
Representing the Soviet Union
European Rowing Championships
Gold medal – first place	1966 Amsterdam	Coxed four
Gold medal – first place	1967 Vichy	Quad sculls

Natalya Alekseyevna Zakharova (Russian: Наталья Алексеевна Захарова, born 1945) is a retired Russian coxswain. She who two European titles, in the coxed fours in 1966 and in the quadruple sculls in 1967. Zakharova graduated from the Russian State University of Physical Education, Sport, Youth and Tourism, and after retiring from competitions worked as an instructor of physical education.
