= Grishchenko =

Grishchenko is a surname. Notable people with the surname include:

- Vladimir Grishchenko (born 1972), Russian footballer
- Sergey Grishchenko (1947–2000), Soviet alpine skier

== See also ==
- Grishchenkov, a Russian surname
