= Valentina Turkova =

Russian coxswain rower

Personal information
- Nationality: Russian
- Citizenship: Soviet Union

Sport
- Sport: Rowing
Medal record
Representing the Soviet Union
European Rowing Championships
Silver medal – second place	1964 Amsterdam	Quad sculls
Gold medal – first place	1965 Duisburg	Coxed four
Silver medal – second place	1966 Amsterdam	Quad sculls

Valentina Turkova (Russian: Валентина Туркова) is a retired Russian coxswain who won three medals at the European Rowing Championships between 1964 and 1966.
