= Valeria Lyulyaeva =

Soviet rower

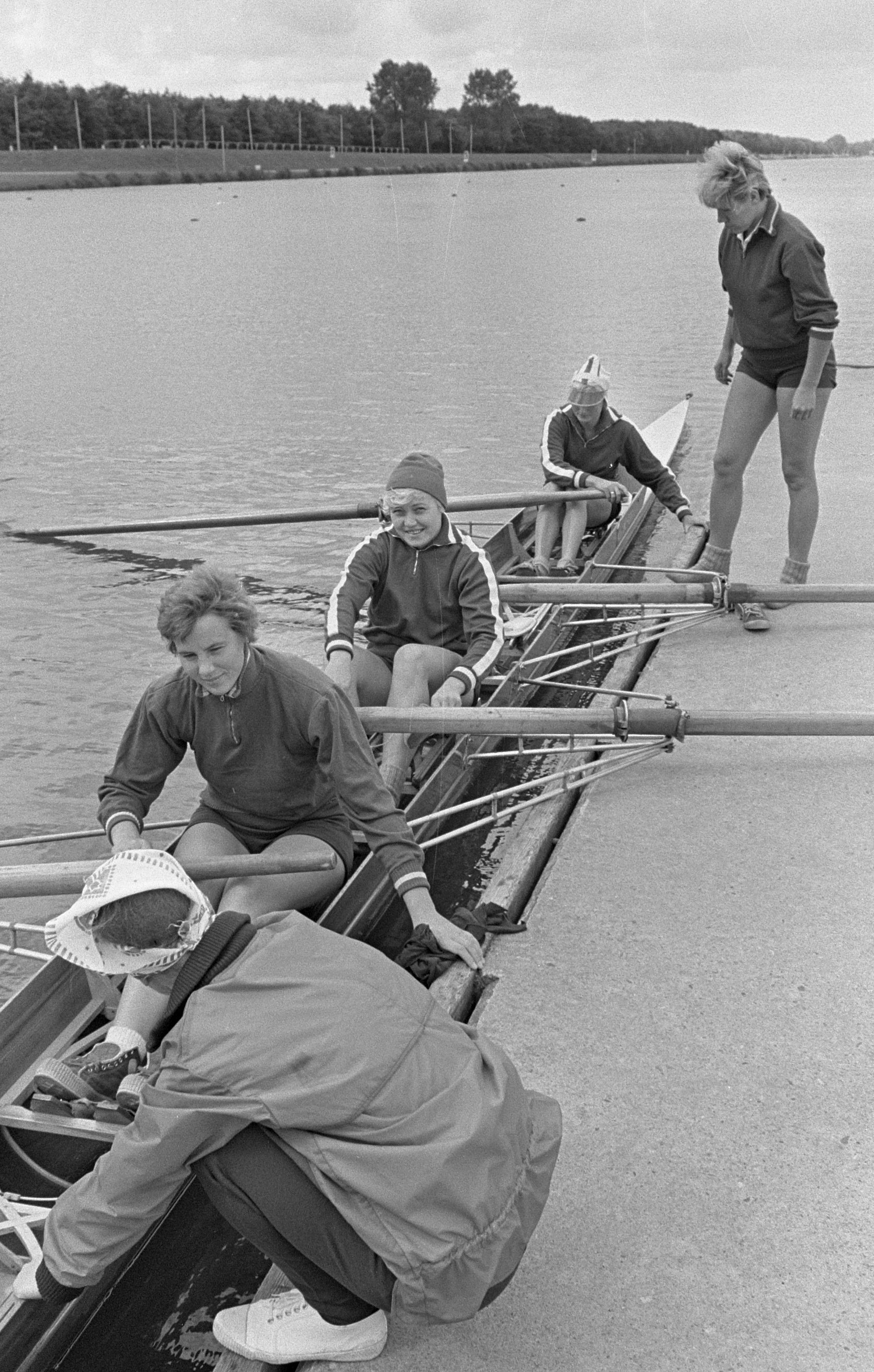
- Soviet coxed four at the 1966 European Championships, Lyulyaeva is in the middle

Personal information
- Full name: Valeria Vasilievna Lyulyaeva
- Born: June 28, 1941 Moscow, Russia
- Died: April 14, 2023 (aged 81) Moscow, Russia

Sport
- Sport: Rowing
- Club: Dynamo
Medal record
Representing the Soviet Union
European Rowing Championships
Gold medal – first place	1966 Amsterdam	Coxed four

Valeria Vasilievna Lyulyaeva (Russian: Валерия Васильевна Люляева, born 28 June 1941) is a retired Russian rower who won a European title in the coxed four in 1966.
