= Sofija Korkutytė =

Personal information
- Born: 22 July 1939 Mitriškės, Lithuania
- Died: 23 May 2000 (aged 60) Vilnius, Lithuania

Sport
- Sport: Rowing
Medal record
Representing the Soviet Union
European Rowing Championships
Gold medal – first place	1963 Moscow	Eights
Silver medal – second place	1964 Amsterdam	Eights
Gold medal – first place	1965 Duisburg	Eights
Silver medal – second place	1966 Amsterdam	Eights
Gold medal – first place	1967 Vichy	Eights

Sofija Korkutytė (22 July 1939 – 23 May 2000) was a Lithuanian rower who won three European titles in the eights event in 1963, 1965 and 1967; she finished second in 1964 and 1966. In 1966 Korkutytė graduated from the Economics Faculty of Vilnius University. From 1964 to 1981 she worked as a rowing coach and between 1981 and 1998 she was employed at the Lithuanian Ministry of Land Reclamation and Water Management. In parallel she also acted as a rowing judge.
