= Alla Pervorukova =

Russian rower

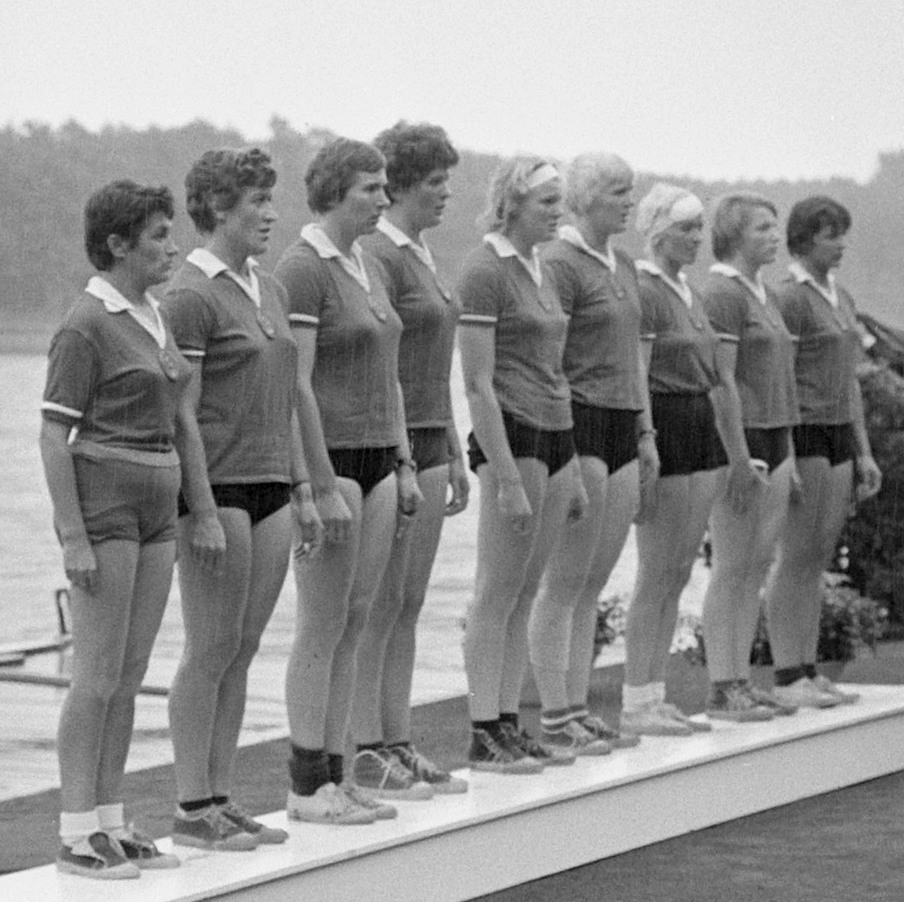
- Soviet eight at the 1965 European Championships, Pervorukova is second from left

Sport
- Sport: Rowing
Medal record
Representing the Soviet Union
European Rowing Championships
| Gold medal – first place | 1963 Moscow | Eight |
| Silver medal – second place | 1964 Amsterdam | Eight |
| Gold medal – first place | 1965 Duisburg | Eight |
| Silver medal – second place | 1966 Amsterdam | Eight |
| Gold medal – first place | 1967 Vichy | Eight |

Alla Pervorukova (Russian: Алла Перворукова) is a retired Russian rower who won three European titles in the eight event in 1963, 1965 and 1967; she finished second in 1964 and 1966.
