= 1966 European Rowing Championships =

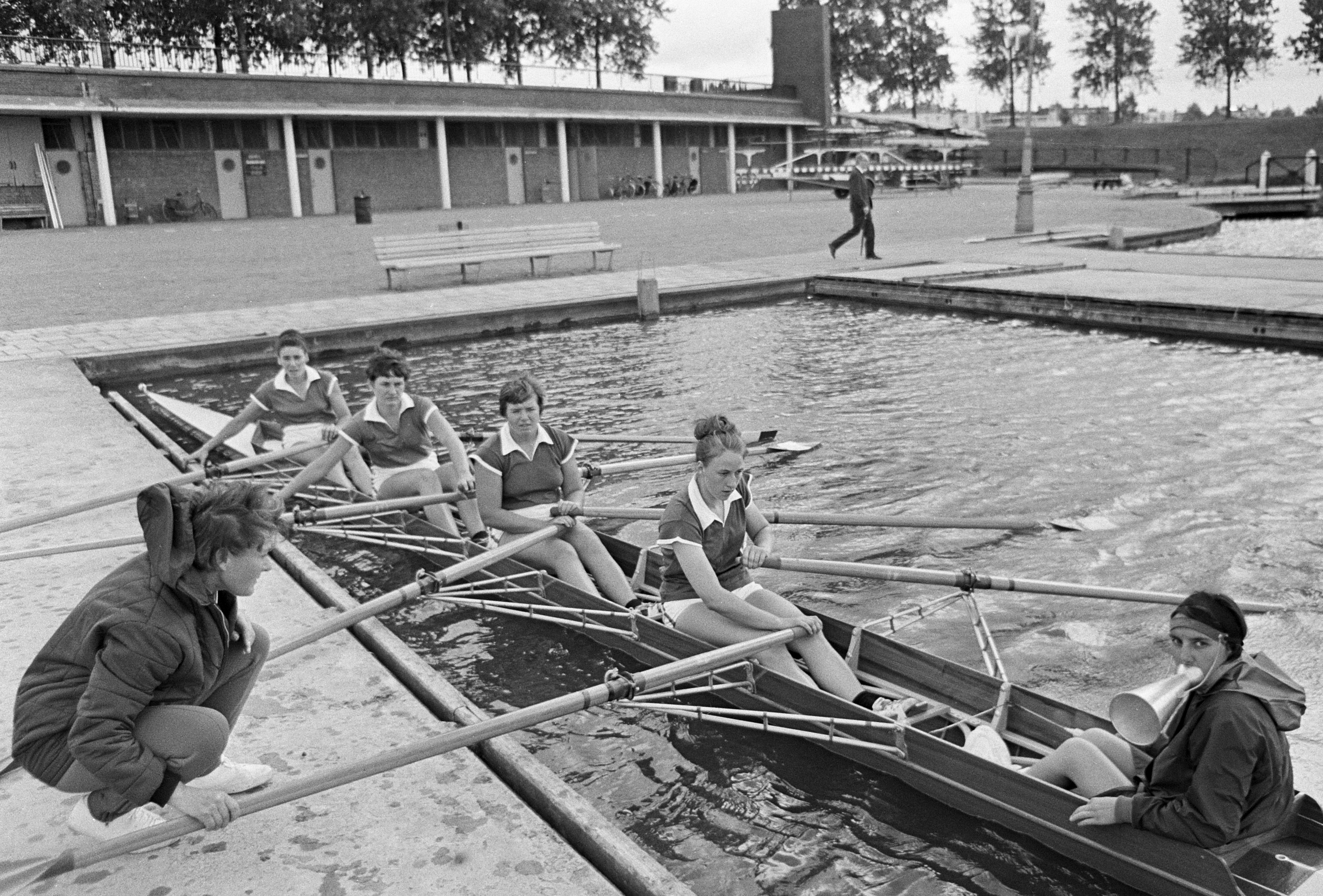
- Soviet women coxed quad scull at Bosbaan
- Venue: Bosbaan
- Location: Amsterdam, the Netherlands
- Dates: 26–28 August 1966
- Nations: 13

The 1966 European Rowing Championships were rowing championships held on the Bosbaan in the Dutch city of Amsterdam; the venue had previously been used for the 1954 and 1964 European Rowing Championships. This edition of the European Rowing Championships was for women only and was held from 26 to 28 August. Thirteen countries contested five boat classes (W1x, W2x, W4x+, W4+, W8+), and 39 teams were competing. Two weeks later, men would meet in Bled, Yugoslavia, at the second edition of the World Rowing Championships.

== Background ==
The championships were initially awarded to Romania, but they withdrew. Other countries, including England, were then asked whether they could host the championships instead. With only a few months to go, the decision was made in April 1966 to hold the championships at the Bosbaan, the same venue that was used for the 1964 championships. For the first time since 1955, FISA allowed separate German crews to compete; in the intervening years, East and West Germany had to have selection trials to determine which rowers would start in the various boat classes.

== Medal summary – women's events ==
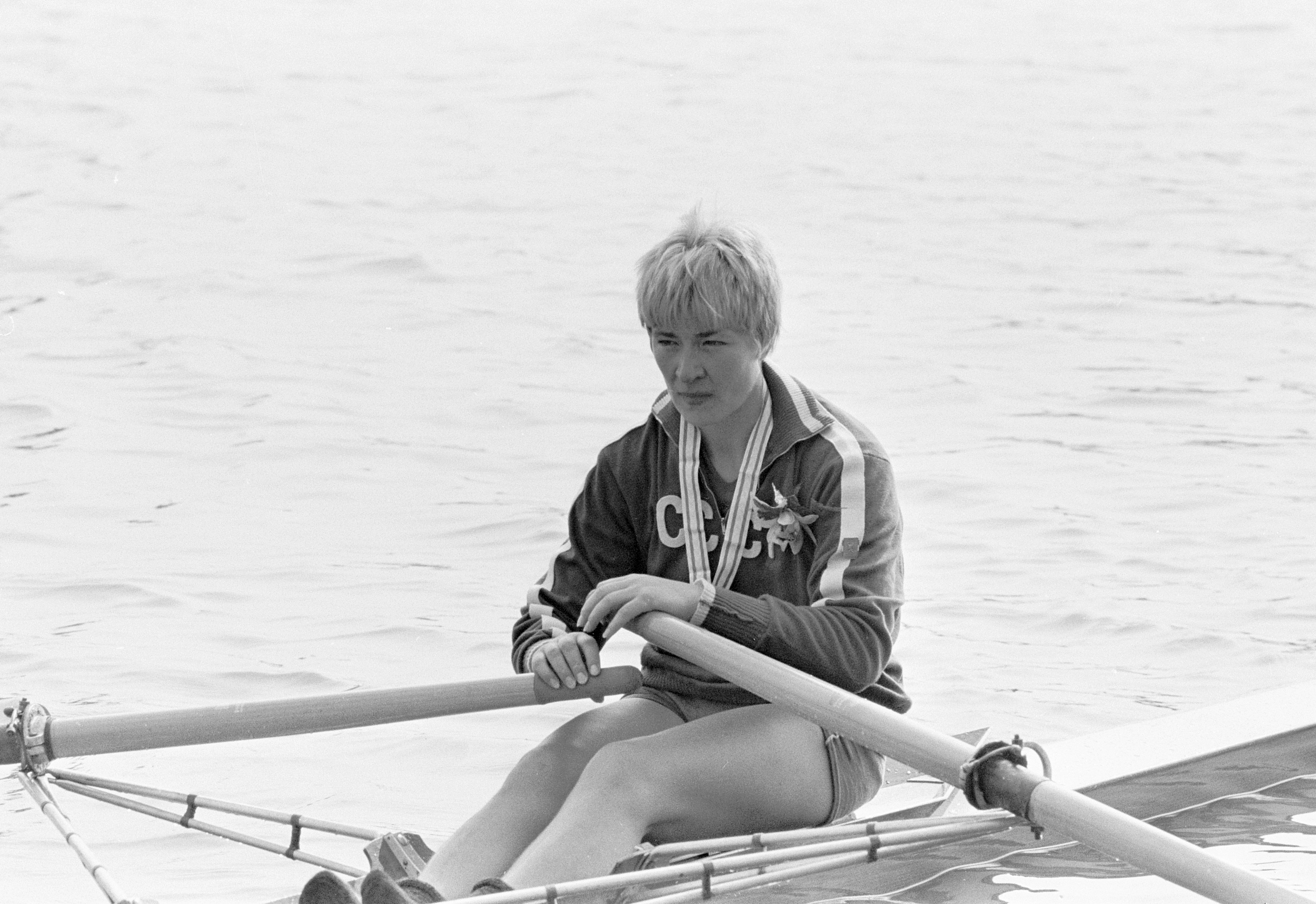
Galina Konstantinova won the single sculls event

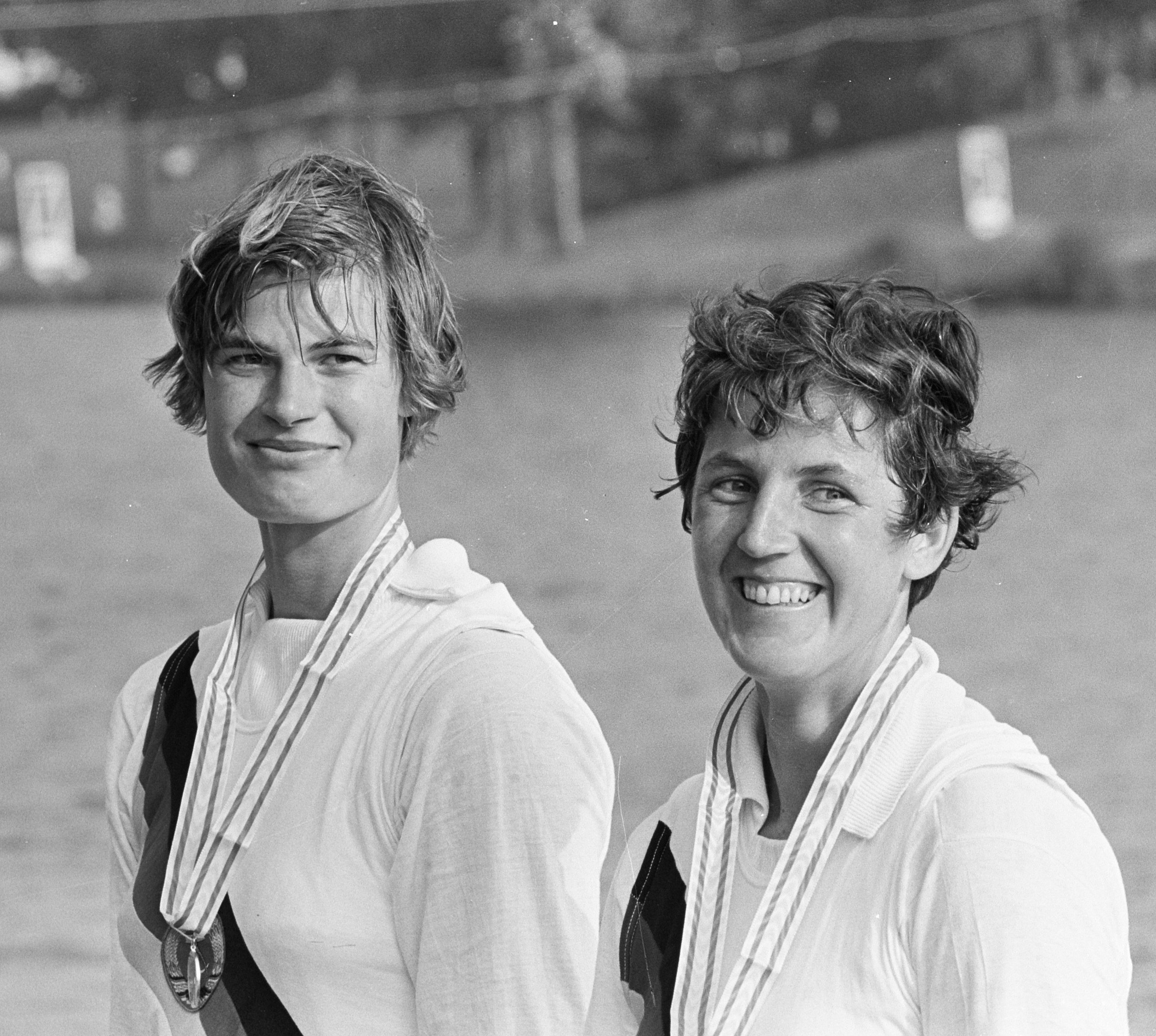
Pankraths and Sommer won the double sculls event

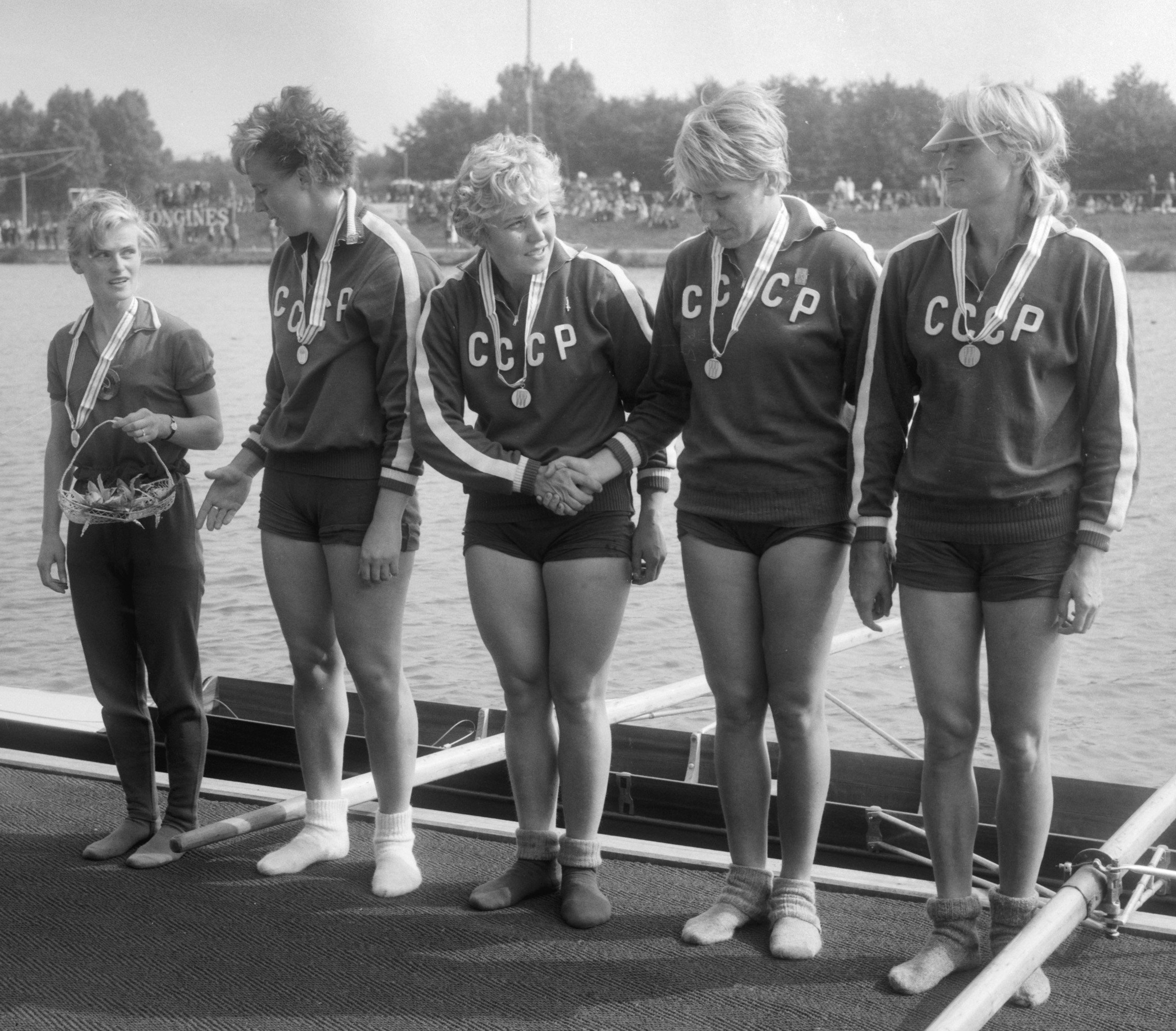
Soviet women coxed four gold medallists

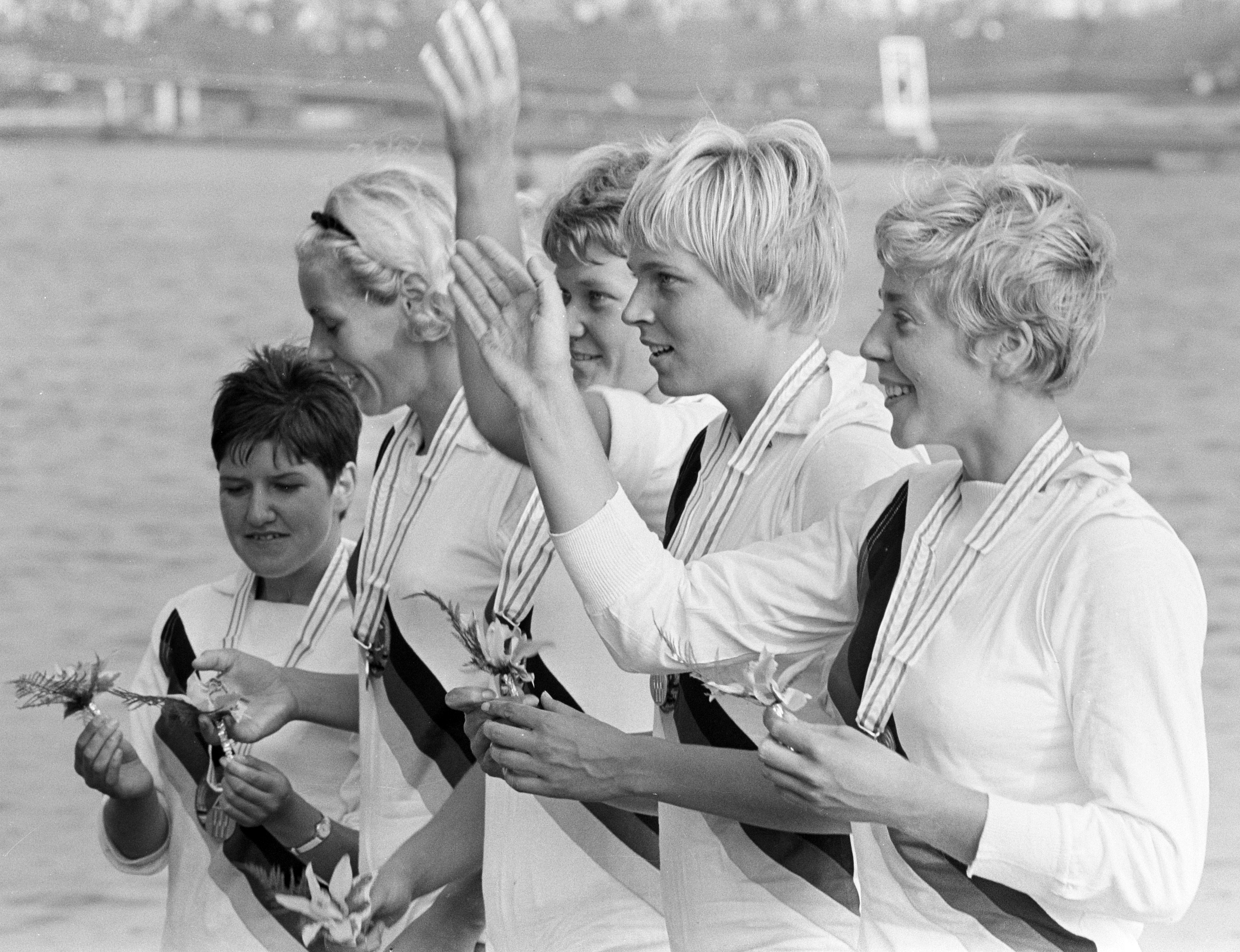
East German coxed quad scull gold medallists

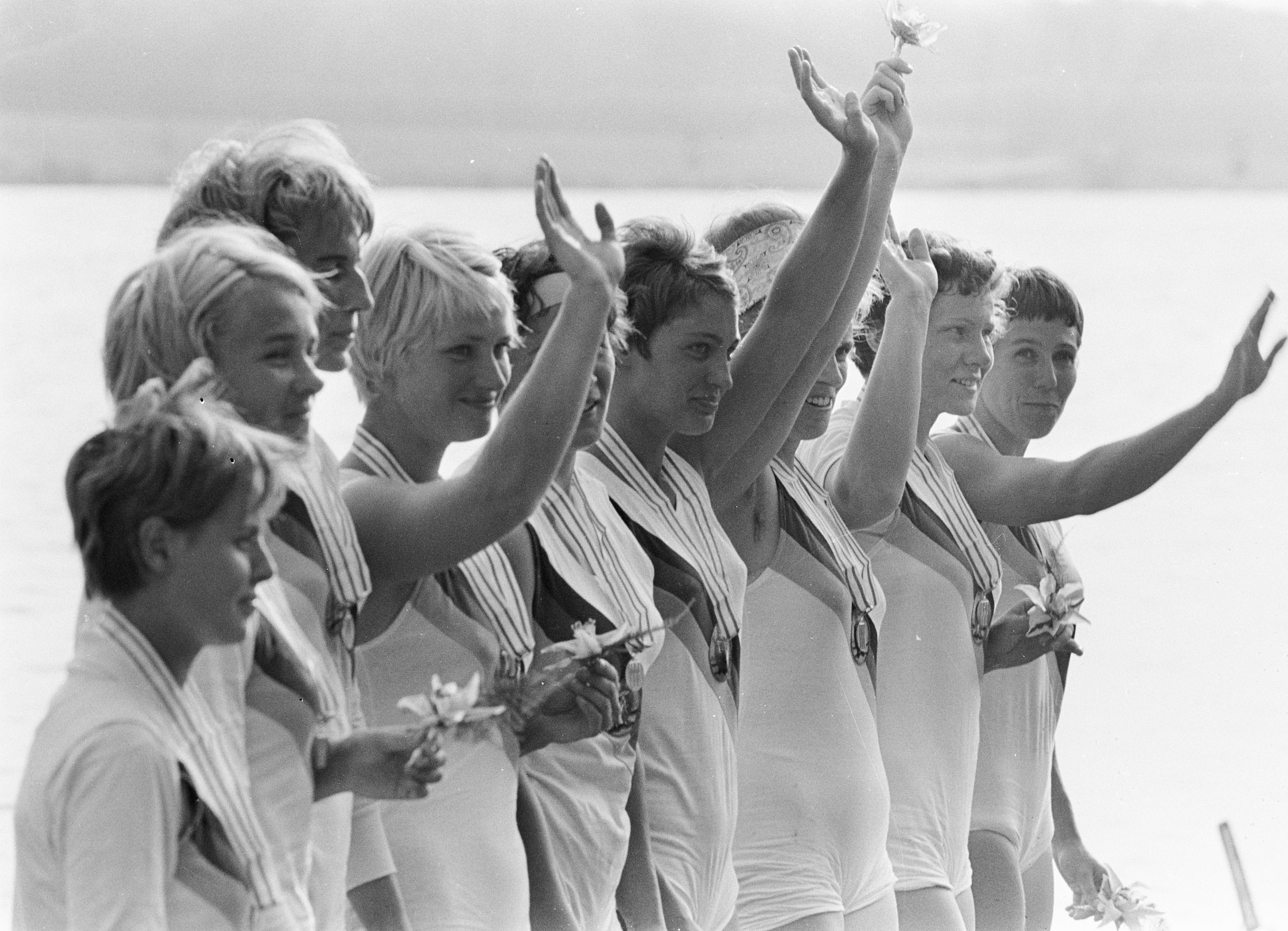
East German women's eight gold medallists

The 13 countries represented at the Bosbaan were Bulgaria, Great Britain, Czechoslovakia, Denmark, France, Hungary, Italy, Romania, the Soviet Union, Sweden, East Germany, West Germany, and the Netherlands as hosts.

Event	Gold		Silver		Bronze	
Event	Country & rowers	Time	Country & rowers	Time	Country & rowers	Time
W1x	Soviet Union; Galina Konstantinova	4:16,87	Czechoslovakia; Alena Kvasilová–Postlová	4:17.80	East Germany; Anita Kuhlke	4:18.28
W2x	East Germany; Ursula Pankraths; Monika Sommer	4:05.21	West Germany; Annemarie Rupprecht; Christl Schmidt-Lehnert	4:05.97	Soviet Union; Tatyana Gomolko; Daina Schweiz	4:07.28
W4+	Soviet Union; Galina Klimova; Alla Alekseyeva; Alla Kuleshova; Valeria Lyulyaeva; Natalya Zakharova (cox)	3:56.88	Romania; Ana Raicu; Florica Ghiuzelea; Viorica Moldovan; Emilia Rigard; Stefania Borisov (cox)	4:00.86	East Germany; Hanna Mitter; Helga Schmidt; Gitta Kubik; Sabine Kosel; Gudrun Apelt (cox)	4:02.37
W4x+	East Germany; Dagmar Holst; Ingelore Bahls; Inge Gabriel; Inge Bartlog; Karin Luck (cox)	3:41.81	Soviet Union; Sofia Grucova; Yevgeniia Maliseva; Tatyana Markvo; Aleksandra Bocharova; Valentina Turkova (cox)	3:42.06	Romania; Maria Covaci; Ileana Nemeth; Elisabeta Vorindan; Maria Hublea; Stefania Borisov (cox)	3:49.21
W8+	East Germany; Marianne Mewes; Brigitte Butze; Ingrid Falk; Irmgard Böhmer; Inge Mundt; Hilde Amelang; Margarete Selling; Brigitte Amm; Ursula Jurga (cox)	3:32.41	Soviet Union; Alla Pervorukova; Irena Bačiulytė; Sofija Korkutytė; Leokadija Semashko; Genė Galinytė; Aldona Čiukšytė; Stanislava Bubulytė; Rita Tamašauskaitė; Jūratė Narvidaite (cox)	3:44.50	Netherlands; Antoinette Hazevoet; Janna Olsder; Willemina Bernelot-Moens; Joke Huisman; Johanna Bosch; Gerharda Tuitert; Jenny Groeneweg; Geertruida Cornelese; W. de Jongh (cox)	3:45.60

== Medals table ==
For the first time in the history of the European Championships, the East German women were more successful than their Soviet counterparts. Six of those countries won medals, with both East Germany and the Soviet Union winning medals in all five boat classes.

Rank	Nation	Gold	Silver	Bronze	Total
1	East Germany (GDR)	3	0	2	5
2	Soviet Union (URS)	2	2	1	5
3	Romania (ROM)	0	1	1	2
4	Czechoslovakia (TCH)	0	1	0	1
4	West Germany (FRG)	0	1	0	1
6	Netherlands (NED)	0	0	1	1
Totals (6 entries)		5	5	5	15
