= Monika Sommer =

East German rower

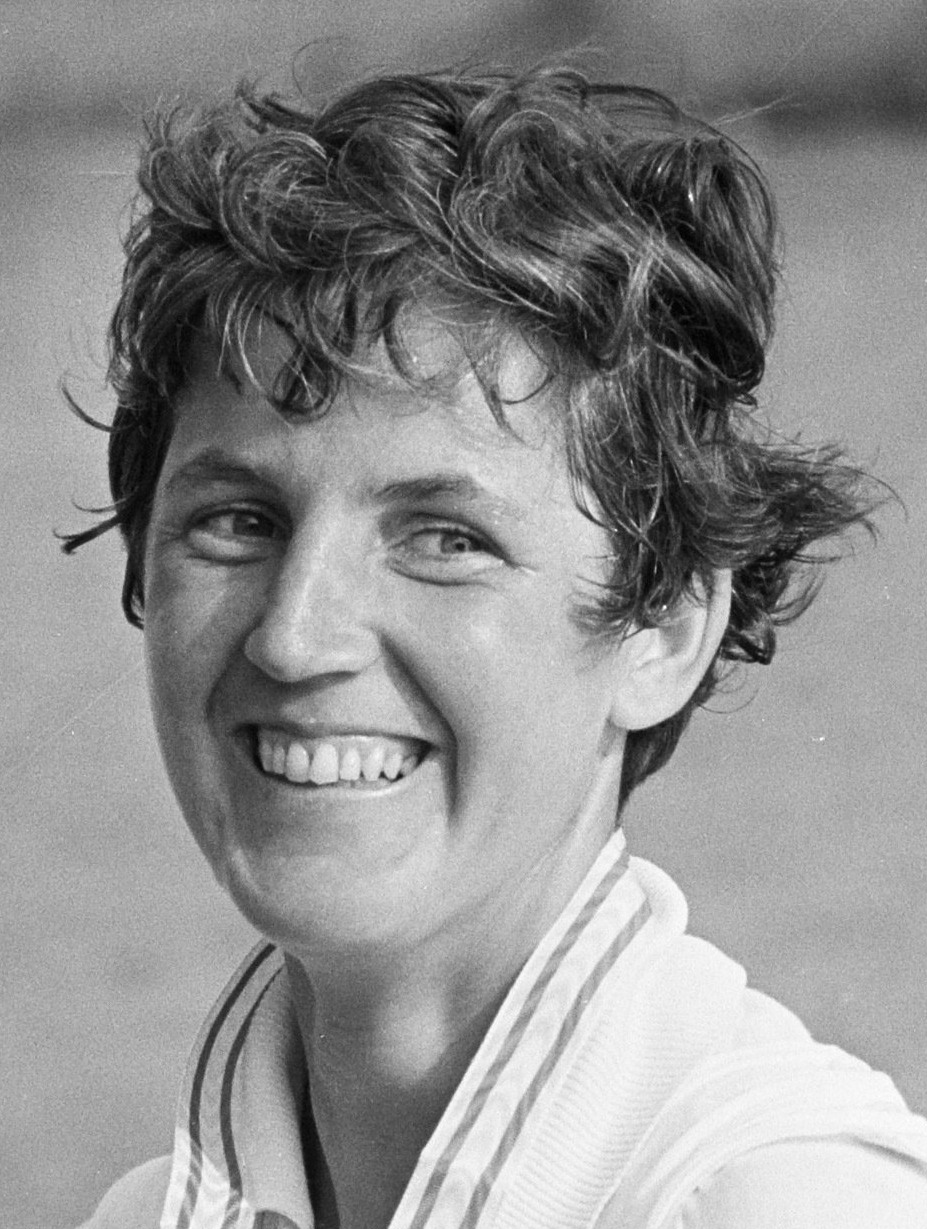
- Monika Sommer after winning the European doubles title in 1966

Sport
- Sport: Rowing
Medal record
Representing East Germany
European Rowing Championships
Silver medal – second place	1962 East Berlin	Quad sculls
Silver medal – second place	1963 Moscow	Quad sculls
Gold medal – first place	1966 Amsterdam	Double sculls
Silver medal – second place	1967 Vichy	Double sculls

Monika Sommer is a retired East German rower who won four medals at European championships between 1962 and 1967, including a gold medal in double sculls in 1966, together with Ursula Pankraths.
