= Ursula Jurga =

East German coxswain

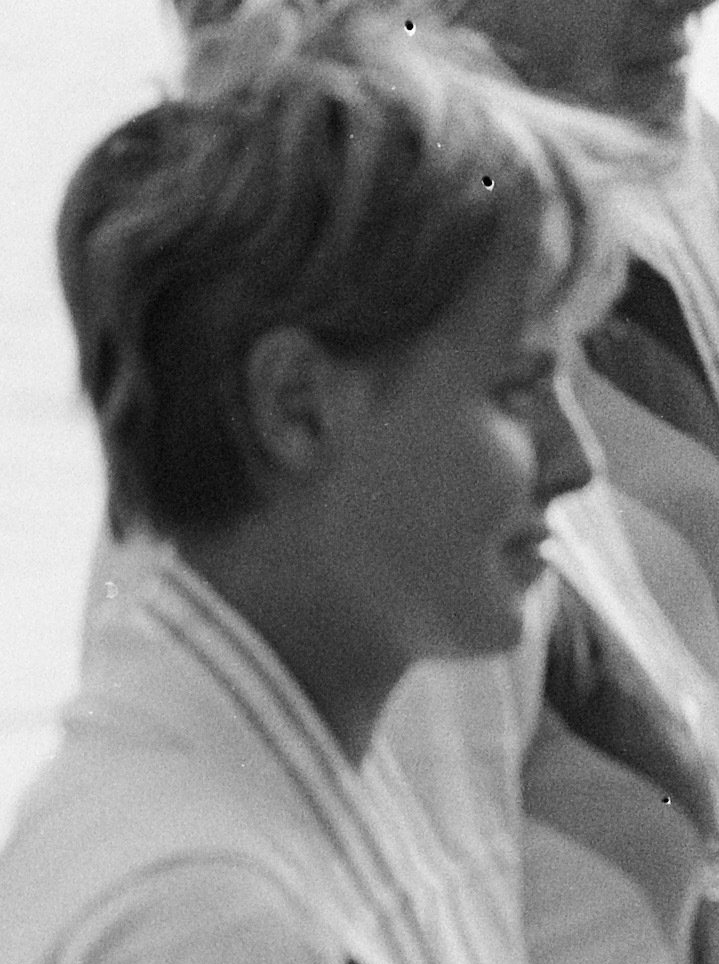
- Jurga at the 1966 European Championships

Sport
- Sport: Rowing
- Club: TSC Berlin
Medal record
Women's rowing
Representing East Germany
European Rowing Championships
Silver medal – second place	1963 Moscow	Quad sculls
Silver medal – second place	1964 Amsterdam	Coxed four
Gold medal – first place	1966 Amsterdam	Eights

Ursula Jurga is a retired East German coxswain who won one gold and two silver medals at the European championships of 1963–1966.
