= Rita Tamašauskaitė =

Lithuanian rower

Personal information
- Born: 22 June 1941 (age 85) Debeikiai, Lithuania

Sport
- Sport: Rowing
Medal record
Women's rowing
Representing the Soviet Union
European Rowing Championships
| Gold medal – first place | 1963 Moscow | Eight |
| Gold medal – first place | 1965 Duisburg | Eight |
| Silver medal – second place | 1966 Amsterdam | Eight |
| Gold medal – first place | 1967 Vichy | Eight |

Rita Tamašauskaitė (born 22 June 1941) is a retired Lithuanian rower who won three European titles in the eights event in 1963, 1965 and 1967; she finished second in 1966. In 1962 Tamašauskaitė graduated from the Lithuanian Sports University and later worked as a rowing referee.
