= Galina Mitrokhina (rower) =

Russian rower (born 1940)

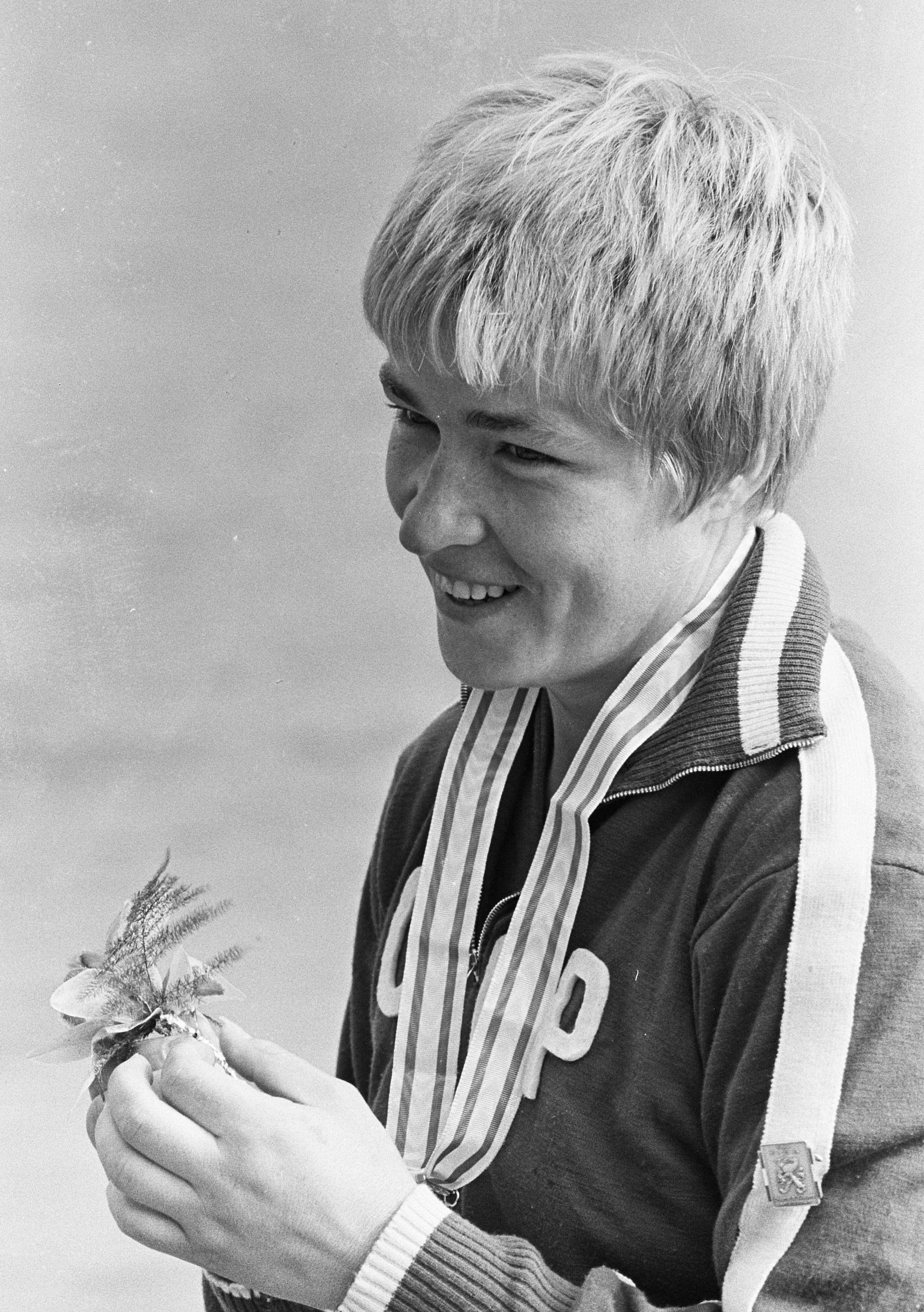
- Mitrokhina at the 1966 European Championships

Personal information
- Born: 14 February 1940 (age 86) Moscow, Russia

Sport
- Sport: Rowing
- Club: Dynamo Moscow
Medal record
Representing the Soviet Union
European Rowing Championships
Bronze medal – third place	1962 East Berlin	Single sculls
Gold medal – first place	1963 Moscow	Single sculls
Gold medal – first place	1964 Amsterdam	Single sculls
Gold medal – first place	1965 Duisburg	Single sculls
Gold medal – first place	1966 Amsterdam	Single sculls
Gold medal – first place	1967 Vichy	Quad sculls
Silver medal – second place	1971 Copenhagen	Quad sculls

Galina Mikhailovna Mitrokhina (née Samorodova, then Konstantinova; Russian: Галина Михайловна Митрохина, Константинова, Самородова; born 14 February 1940) is a retired Russian rower. She won bronze in the single sculls at the 1962 European Rowing Championships in East Berlin. Between 1963 and 1967 she won five more European titles in single and quad sculls. She also won six national titles in single (1962–1966) and quad sculls (1967). After retirement she worked as a coach.
