= Aldona Čiukšytė =

Lithuanian rower

Personal information
- Born: 9 February 1944 (age 82) Repšėnai, Lithuania

Sport
- Sport: Rowing
Medal record
Representing the Soviet Union
European Rowing Championships
Gold medal – first place	1965 Duisburg	Eight
Silver medal – second place	1966 Amsterdam	Eight
Gold medal – first place	1967 Vichy	Eight

Aldona Čiukšytė (born 9 February 1944) is a retired Lithuanian rower who won two European titles in the eights event in 1965 and 1967; she finished second in 1966. In 1973 Čiukšytė graduated from the Economics Faculty of Vilnius University and later worked in the food administration in Vilnius.
