= Genė Galinytė =

Lithuanian rower

Personal information
- Born: 18 January 1945 (age 81) Butkeliai, Lithuania

Sport
- Sport: Rowing
Medal record
Representing the Soviet Union
European Rowing Championships
Silver medal – second place	1966 Amsterdam	Eight
Gold medal – first place	1967 Vichy	Eight

Genė Galinytė (born 18 January 1945) is a retired Lithuanian rower who won two European medals in the eights event in 1966 and 1967. In 1967 she graduated from the Lithuanian University of Educational Sciences, and since 1970 worked at the Vilnius City Sports Council.
