= Ingrid Falk (rower) =

East German rower

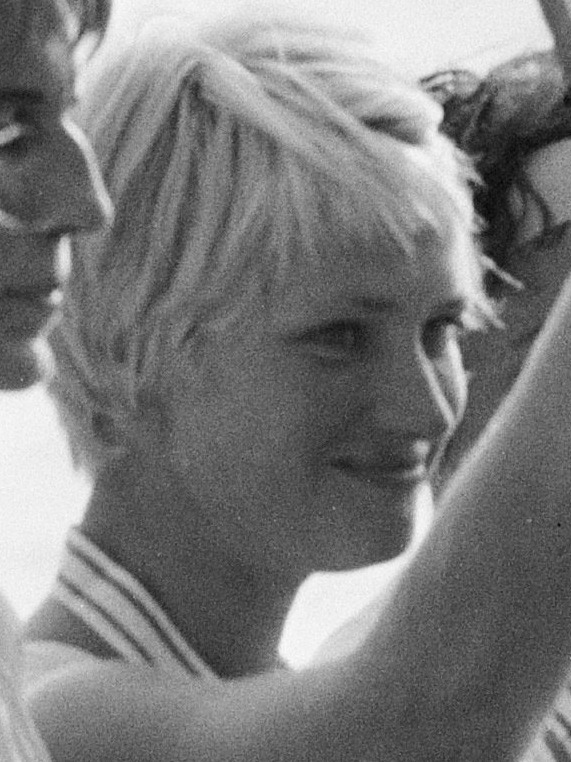
- Falk at the 1966 European Championships

Sport
- Sport: Rowing
- Club: TSC Berlin
Medal record
Women's rowing
Representing East Germany
European Rowing Championships
Silver medal – second place	1964 Amsterdam	Coxed four
Gold medal – first place	1966 Amsterdam	Eight

Ingrid Falk is a retired East German rower. At European championships she won a silver medal in the coxed fours in 1964 and a gold in the eights in 1966. Before 1966 she competed as Ingrid Fischer.
