= Andrey Klimov =

Andrey Klimov may refer to:

- Andrey Klimov (politician) (born 1954), Russian politician
- Andrey Klimov (boxer) (born 1982), Russian boxer
