= Aldona Marciniak =

Polish sports journalist (born 1984)

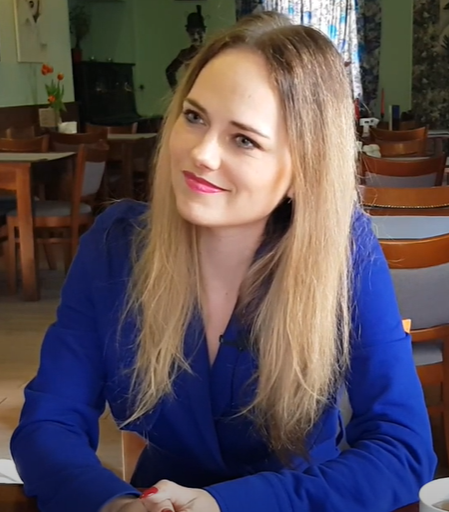
- Marciniak being interviewed in 2020
- Born: 1984 (age 41–42); Warsaw, Poland
- Occupations: Broadcaster; Journalist
- Years active: 2006–present

Aldona Marciniak (born 1984) is a Polish sports journalist and broadcaster. She has worked for the Przegląd Sportowy newspaper since 2006 as a journalist focusing on motor racing, particularly Formula One and the World Rally Championship. Marciniak has reported on Formula One for the Viaplay and Eleven Sports broadcasters as well as the 2020 Summer Olympics in Tokyo.

== Biography ==
Marciniak was born in Warsaw, Poland in 1984. She is the only child of her parents. Marciniak was educated at the LXIV High School, Warsaw named after Stanisław Ignacy Witkiewicz and is a graduate of the Institute of Journalism at the University of Warsaw.

She made her television debut in an episode of the music talent show Szansa na sukces in 2000, performing a song by Edyta Górniak. In 2006, Marciniak began working at the Przegląd Sportowy newspaper as a journalist focusing on motor racing, particularly Formula One and the World Rally Championship. She has also reported on the European Le Mans Series, as well as tennis and volleyball. She initially had a three-month internship at the publication before getting a full-time job; Marciniak had always wanted to specalise in motor racing, having watched it during her childhood and playing with toy cars instead of dolls, and the start of her career coincided with the F1 debut of Poland's Robert Kubica. She worked under the guidance of the journalist Cezary Gutowski. Marciniak was the presenter of the sports programme Misja Tokio about the 2020 Summer Olympics in Tokyo in 2021. When Viaplay acquired the rights to Formula One in Poland from Eleven Sports in 2023, she joined their broadcast team as a member of its editorial team, having also worked in the sport for Eleven Sports. Marciniak worked as both a reporter and expert, and returned to Eleven Sports in 2025 when the network reacquired the Polish broadcast rights to Formula One.

In 2019, she co-authored the biographical book Niezniszczalny about Kubica with Gutowski, with whom she co-presents the podcast CoDrive. Since 2021, Marciniak has been a co-presenter of the annual Sports Champions Gala. She and Łukaszem Kadziewiczem have operated the weekly video magazine Misja Sport since November 2021 and she has also appeared on the Pol Position as a guest until mid-2022. Marciniak operates a channel on YouTube.
