= Aldona Młyńczak =

Polish politician (born 1958)

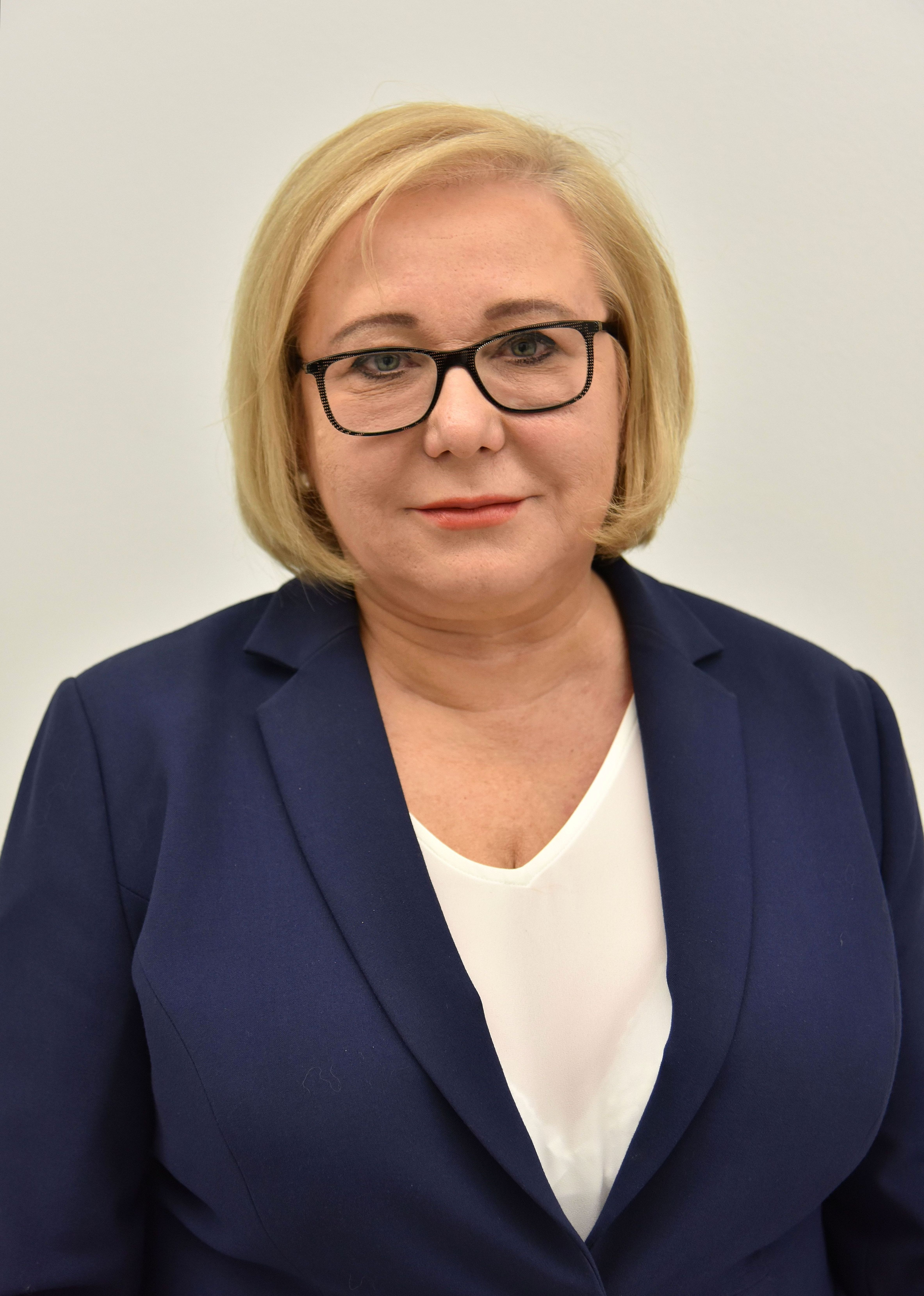
- Młyńczak in 2016

Member of the Sejm
- Incumbent
- Assumed office 25 September 2005
- Constituency: 3 – Wrocław

Personal details
- Born: 25 May 1958 (age 67) Wrocław
- Party: Civic Platform

Aldona Janina Młyńczak (born 25 May 1958) is a Polish politician. She was elected to the Sejm on 25 September 2005, getting 2,903 votes in 3 Wrocław district as a candidate from the Civic Platform list.

== See also ==
- Members of Polish Sejm 2005-2007
