= Galina Klimova =

Russian rower

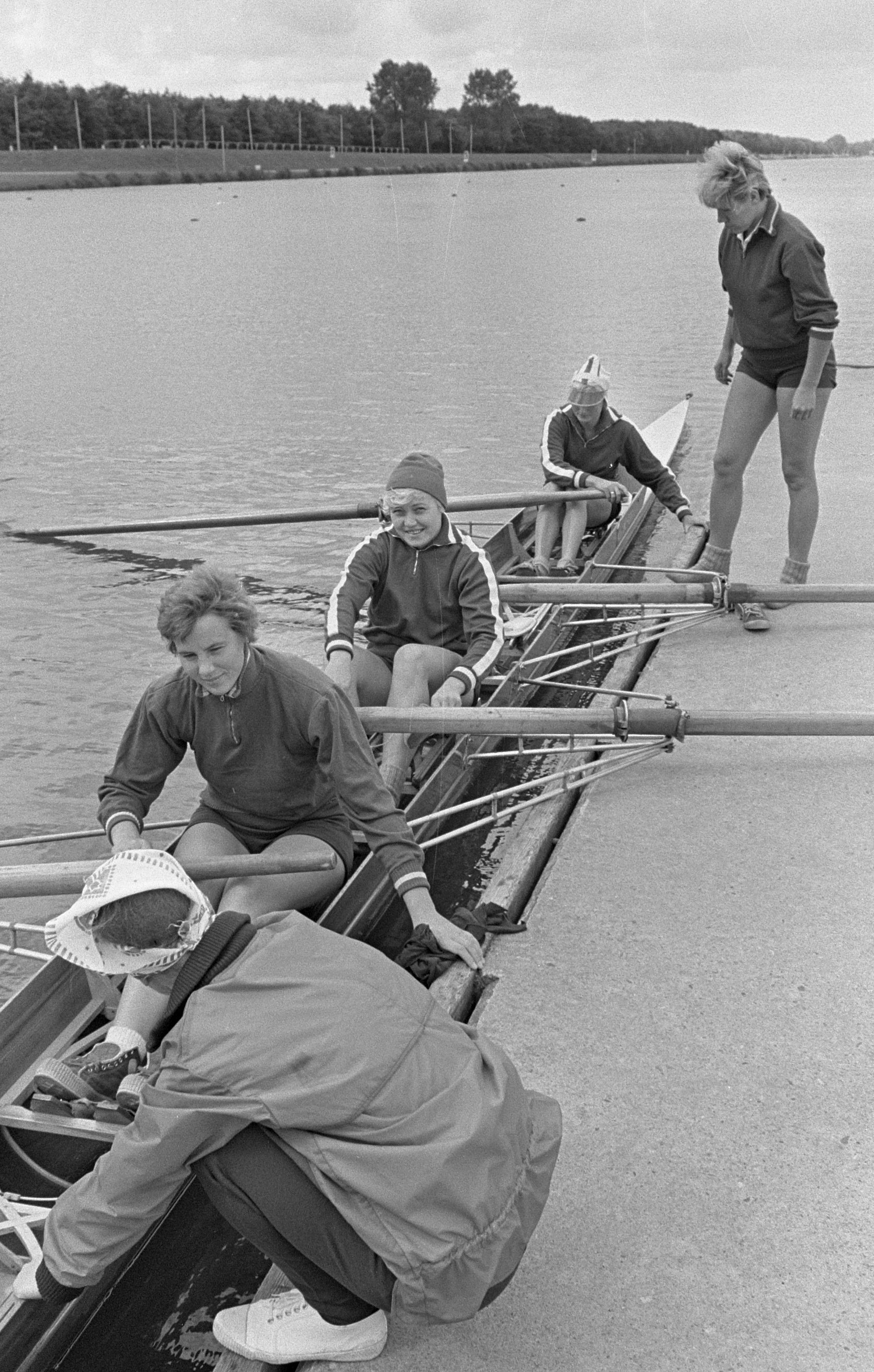
- Soviet coxed four at the 1966 European Championships, Klimova is likely 2nd from bottom

Personal information
- Born: 23 August 1942 (age 83) Smolensk Oblast, Russia

Sport
- Sport: Rowing
- Club: Dynamo
Medal record
Representing the Soviet Union
European Rowing Championships
Gold medal – first place	1966 Amsterdam	Coxed four

Galina Ivanovna Klimova (Russian: Галина Ивановна Климова, born 23 August 1942) is a retired Russian rower who won a European title in the coxed fours in 1966.
