= Nina Grishchenkova =

Russian rowing coxswain

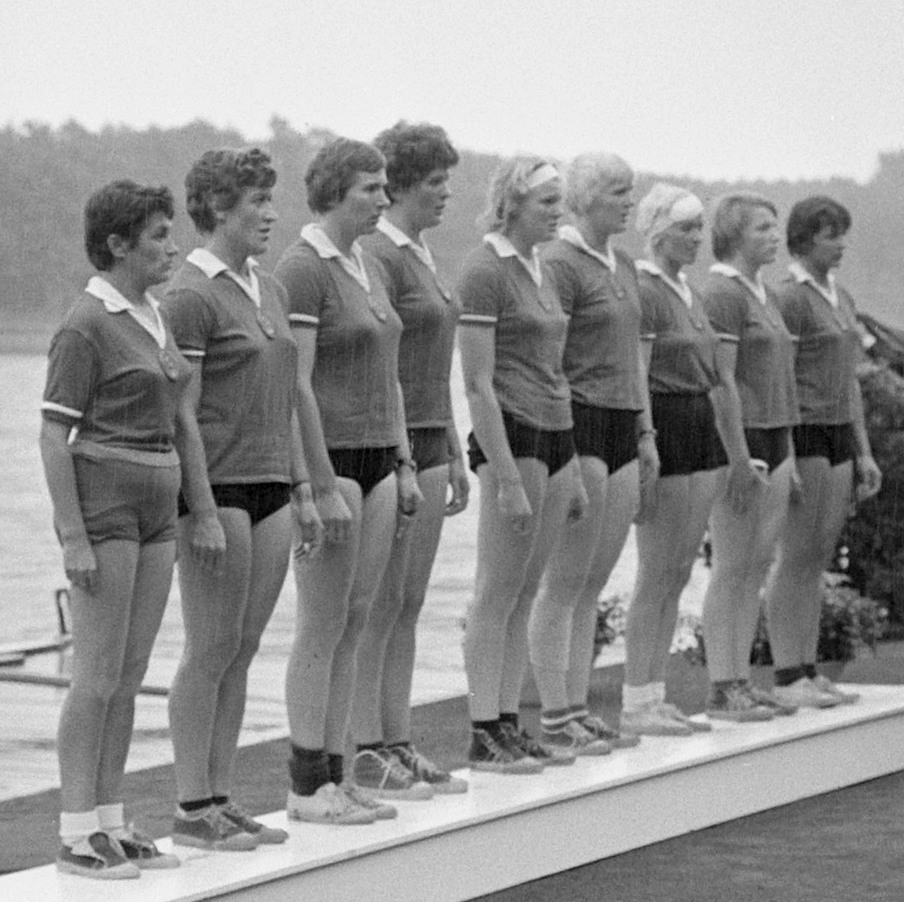
- Soviet eight at the 1965 European Championships, Grischenko is first from left

Sport
- Sport: Rowing
Medal record
Representing the Soviet Union
European Rowing Championships
Gold medal – first place	1963 Moscow	Eight
Gold medal – first place	1965 Duisburg	Eight

Nina Grishchenkova (Russian: Нина Грищенкова) is a retired Russian rowing coxswain who won two European titles in the eights in 1963 and 1965.
