= Aldona Margenytė =

Lithuanian rower

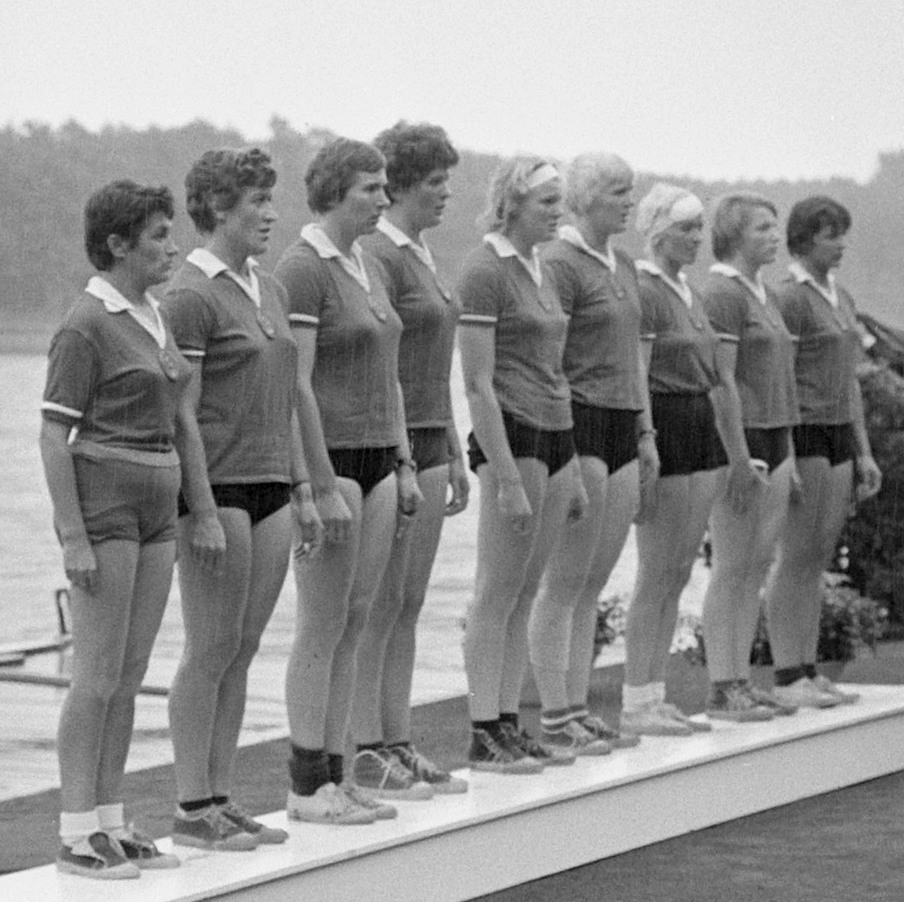
- Soviet eight at the 1965 European Championships, Margenytė is fourth from right

Sport
- Sport: Rowing
Medal record
Representing the Soviet Union
European Rowing Championships
Gold medal – first place	1963 Moscow	Eight
Gold medal – first place	1965 Duisburg	Eight

Aldona Margenytė is a retired Lithuanian rower who won two European titles in the eights event in 1963 and 1965. One of these titles was a gold medal in the 1963 European Rowing Championships.

== See also ==
- 1963 European Rowing Championships (women)
