= 1963 European Rowing Championships (women) =

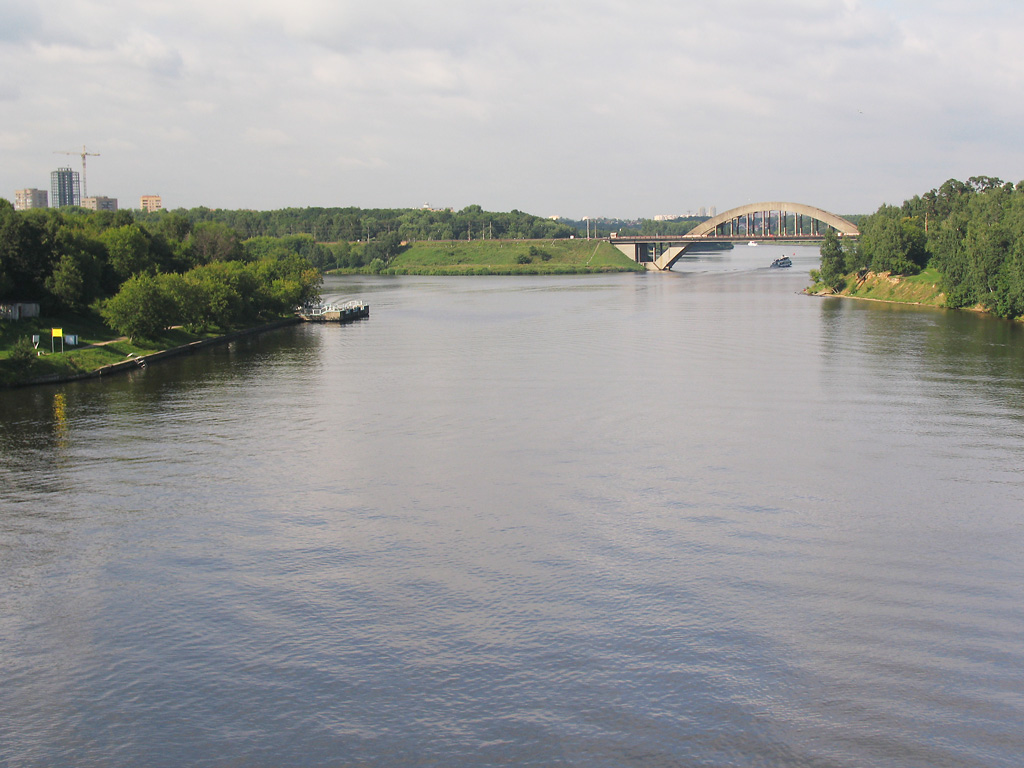
- View of the Khimki Reservoir
- Venue: Khimki Reservoir, Moscow Canal
- Location: Khimki, Moscow Oblast, Soviet Union
- Dates: 6–8 September 1963
- Nations: 11

The 1964 European Rowing Championships for women were rowing championships held on the Khimki Reservoir, which is part of the Moscow Canal, in Khimki near Moscow in the Soviet Union. The competition for men had been held the previous month in Copenhagen. The regatta in Khimki was held from 6 to 8 September. Five boat classes were contested (W1x, W2x, W4x+, W4+, W8+). Eleven countries nominated a total of 33 boats for the regatta, which was held over 1,000 metres. Five lanes were available and this meant that in three boat classes, there was only the final: W2x, W4+, and W8+.

== German participation ==
FISA did not recognise East Germany as a country and insisted on one German team per boat class. The selection trials were won by West Germany in the single sculls boat class (Karen Wolf), but the other four boat classes were won by East Germany. Wolf came fifth in the final in Khimki.

== Medal summary – women's events ==
On the day of the finals, it rained heavily and there was a strong crosswind. Those rowers in the lane closest to the shore were least affected by the wind. The singles as the smallest boats are most affected, and the British medal favourite, Penny Chuter, hit the buoys twice and came fourth, and the previous European champion, Alena Postlová, capsized.

Event	Gold		Silver		Bronze	
Event	Country & rowers	Time	Country & rowers	Time	Country & rowers	Time
W1x	Soviet Union; Galina Konstantinova	3:37.70	France; Renée Camu	3:40.11	Hungary; Erzsebet Moser	3:42.19
W2x	Soviet Union; Maija Pampura; Daina Mallenberga	3:27.05	East Germany; Hannelore Göttlich; Christiane Münzberg	3:27.05	Hungary; Anna Domonkos; Maria Pekanovits	3:36.25
W4+	Soviet Union; Nina Shamanova; Ella Sergeyeva; Valentina Terekhova; Nadeschda Tuberosova; Valentina Timofeyeva (cox)	3:28.71	Romania; Iuliana Bulugioiu; Florica Ghiuzelea; Emilia Rigard; Ana Tamas; Stefania Borisov (cox)	3:31.54	Czechoslovakia; Marta Brozova; Sona Bauerova; Jana Knirova; Julie Sucha; Karla Ksandrova (cox)	3:36.10
W4x+	Soviet Union; Aino Pajusalu; Sosja Rakitskaya; Nelli Chernova; Vera Alexeyeva; Tamara Ivanova (cox)	3:21.15	East Germany; Renate Boesler; Antje Thiess; Brigitte Pohl; Monika Sommer; Ursula Jurga (cox)	3:21.80	Hungary; Maria Fekete; Jozsefne Rasko; Zsuzsa Szappanos; Katalin Szendey; Margit Komornik (cox)	3:21.98
W8+	Soviet Union; Alla Pervorukova; Irena Bačiulytė; Sofija Korkutytė; Leokadija Semashko; Aldona Margenytė; Rita Tamašauskaitė; Stanislava Bubulytė; Genovaite Strigulaite; Nina Grishchenkova (cox)	3:12.75	East Germany; Barbara Müller; Helga Ammon; Brigitte Amm; Ingrid Graf; Hilde Amelang; Ute Gabler; Brigitte Rintisch; Marianne Mewes; Elfriede Boetius (cox)	3:16.49	Romania; Viorica Moldovan; Ecaterina Trancioveanu; Maria Trinks; Marioara Stoian; Mariana Limpede; Cornelia Vladut; Ecaterina Oros; Olimpiada Bogdan; Angela Paunescu (cox)	3:18.9

== Medals table ==
The Soviet Union won all five gold medals. Other countries that competed in the finals but did not win medals were Great Britain, West Germany, the Netherlands, and Poland. Valentina Tereshkova, the first women who had travelled to space in June 1963, donated a crystal cup that was won by the Soviet team for being the most successful country.

Rank	Nation	Gold	Silver	Bronze	Total
1	Soviet Union (URS)	5	0	0	5
2	East Germany (GDR)	0	3	0	3
3	Romania (ROM)	0	1	1	2
4	France (FRA)	0	1	0	1
5	Hungary (HUN)	0	0	3	3
6	Czechoslovakia (TCH)	0	0	1	1
Totals (6 entries)		5	5	5	15
