= List of international winning SV Dynamo sports club athletes =

As a mass sports organization had the SV Dynamo also recognized many victories to reach in international competitions. In this list can be seen many athletes which won at least one bronze medal at the European Championships. Among the Dynamo top scorers were:

== List ==
=== Athletics (track and field) ===
- Andreas Oschkenat
- Brigitte Wujak
- Christa Seeliger Fischer
- Christina Brehmer
- Christoph Höhne
- Cornelia Oschkenat
- Detlef Torith
- Detlef Wagenknecht
- Doris Maletzki
- Ellen Fiedler
- Gisela Birkemeyer
- Gisela Köhler
- Hans-Georg Reimann
- Hartmut Briesenick
- Hildrun Claus
- Ines Vogelsang
- Jacqueline Todten
- Jörg Pfeifer
- Jutta Kirst
- Kathrin Weßel
- Klaus Beer
- Monika Zehrt
- Rita Kühne
- Roland Wieser
- Romy Müller
- Susanne Beyer
- Wolfgang Schmidt

=== Biathlon ===
- André Sehmisch
- Birk Anders
- Dieter Speer
- Eberhard Rösch
- Frank-Peter Roetsch
- Günther Bartnik
- Hans Jörg Knauthe
- Horst Koschka
- Joachim Meischner
- Klaus Siebert
- Manfred Beer
- Matthias Jacob
- Raik Dittrich
- Ralf Göthel
- Wilfried Bock

=== Boxing ===
- Bernd Wittenburg
- Detlef Kästner
- Lutz Käsebier
- Frank Kegelbein
- Klaus-Dieter Kirchstein
- Maik Heydeck
- Otto Babiasch
- Peter Tiepold
- Rainer Poser

=== Cross-country skiing ===
- Anni Unger
- Christel Meinel
- Dietmar Meinel
- Gabriele Haupt
- Gabriele Meinel
- Gerd Heßler
- Gerd-Dietmar Klause
- Marita Dotterweich
- Marlies Rostock
- Stefan Schicker

=== Cycling ===
- Bernd Dittert
- Bill Huck
- Carsten Wolf
- Christa Luding-Rothenburger
- Emanuel Raasch
- Guido Fulst
- Heinz Richter
- Lothar Stäber
- Jan Ullrich
- Jens Fiedler
- Jürgen Schütze
- Manfred Klieme
- Olaf Ludwig
- Peter Gröning
- Rainer Hönisch
- Werner Otto

=== Figure skating ===
- Christine Errath
- Heidemarie Steiner
- Manuela Groß
- Rolf Österreich
- Romy Kermer
- Uwe Kagelmann

=== Fencing ===
- Mandy Niklaus

=== Gymnastics ===
- Andreas Wecker
- Angelika Keilig-Hellmann
- Annelore Zinke
- Birgit Radochla
- Dagmar Kersten
- Dörte Thümmler
- Gabriele Fähnrich
- Irene Abel
- Jürgen Paeke
- Karin Büttner-Janz
- Karola Sube
- Lutz Hoffmann
- Magdalena Schmidt
- Maxi Gnauck
- Michael Nikolay
- Regina Grabolle
- Roland Brückner
- Ulf Hoffmann
- Ulrike Klotz

=== Handball ===
- Günter Zeitler
- Heiko Bonath
- Jörg Paulick
- Jürgen Hildebrandt
- Klaus Dieter Matz
- Klaus Petzold
- Rainer Höft
- Rudi Hirsch
- Werner Senger

=== Ice Hockey ===
- Bernd Karrenbauer
- Bernd Poindl
- Dieter Voigt
- Erich Novy
- Heinz Schildan
- Helmut Novy
- Joachim Franke
- Joachim Ziesche
- Klaus Hirche
- Manfred Buder
- Rainer Tudyka
- Rüdiger Noack
- Ullrich Noack
- Wolfgang Plotka

=== Judo ===
- Andreas Preschel
- Detlef Ultsch
- Dieter Scholz
- Dietmar Höttger
- Dietmar Lorenz
- Frank Borkowski
- Frank Möller
- Fred Ohlhorn
- Günter Krüger
- Günther Wiesner
- Henry Stöhr
- Karl Nitz
- Karl Nietz
- Klaus Henning
- Otto Smirat
- Uwe Stock
- Wolfgang Zuckschwerdt

=== Motocross ===
- Paul Friedrichs

=== Nordic Combined ===
- Günter Deckert
- Heinz Wosipiwo
- Ralph Leonhardt
- Thomas Abratis
- Uwe Dotzauer

=== Parachuting ===
- Bernd Wiesner
- Günther Gerhard
- Hans Peter Schmelzer
- Irina Hornig
- Walter Greschner
- Wolfgang Rieding

=== Riding ===
- Gerhard Schulz

=== Rowing ===
- Anke Borchmann
- Beate Schramm
- Bernd Ahrendt
- Bernd Eichwurzel
- Bernd Höing
- Bernd Krauß
- Bernd Landvoigt
- Bernd Niesecke
- Birgit Peter
- Christa Staak
- Christiane Knetsch
- Daniela Neunast
- Dagmar Holst
- Detlef Kirchhoff
- Dietmar Schiller
- Dietmar Schwarz
- Dietrich Zander
- Eckhard Martens
- Ernst Otto Borchmann
- Frank Dundr
- Frank Klawonn
- Gabriele Kelm
- Gabriele Rotermund
- Gunther Gerhardt
- Hanno Melzer
- Hans Joachim Borzym
- Hans Joachim Puls
- Harold Dimke
- Hartmut Schreiber
- Hendrik Reiher
- Henny Dobler
- Helma Lehmann
- Helmut Hänsel
- Heinrich Mederow
- Henrietta Ebert
- Horst Bagdonat
- Inge Bartlog
- Inge Gabriel
- Ingelohre Bahls
- Irmgard Böhmer
- Irina Müller
- Jana Sorgers
- Jens Köppen
- Joachim Böhmer
- Jörg Friedrich
- Jörg Landvoigt
- Judith Zeidler
- Jutta Lau
- Jutta Hampe
- Jürgen Arndt
- Jürgen Bertow
- Jürgen Kessel
- Jürgen Seyfarth
- Kathrin Haacker
- Karin Luck
- Karl Grzeschuchna
- Karl-Heinz Bußert
- Kathrin Dienstbier
- Katrin Boron
- Karsten Schmeling
- Kerstin Hinze
- Kerstin Toußaint
- Klaus Dieter Ludwig
- Klaus Peter Foppke
- Liane Weigelt
- Manfred Schmorde
- Manfred Schneider
- Martina Schröter
- Margarete Selling
- Marlies Wegner
- Michael Wolfgramm
- Monika Kallies
- Ortwin Rodewald
- Ralf Jobst
- Ramona Balthasar
- Ramona Hein
- Rolf Jobst
- Renate Neu
- Reinhard Gust
- Reinhard Zahn
- Roswitha Zobelt
- Roswitha Reichel
- Rüdiger Reiche
- Sabine Brinker
- Sybille Schmidt
- Thomas Jung
- Ursula Pankraths
- Ursula Wagner
- Ute Stange
- Ute Wild
- Uwe Dühring
- Uwe Kellner
- Viola Goretztki
- Wolfgang Welner

=== Shot put ===
- Hartmut Briesenick
- Marianne Adam

=== Shooting Sports ===
- Behm
- Bernhardt Hochwald
- Dieter Monien
- Faust Steinbrück
- Gerhard Dommrich
- Jörg Damme
- Marlies Moch-Binder
- Martin
- Metelmann
- Norbert Klaar
- Olaf Hess
- Peter Gorewski
- Regina Petzke

=== Ski Jumping ===
- Andreas Kunz
- Harry Glaß
- Henry Glaß
- Klaus Ostwald
- Manfred Deckert
- Matthias Buse

=== Soccer ===
- Artur Ullrich
- Bernd Jakubowski
- Bodo Rudwaleit
- Dieter Riedel
- Frank Ganzera
- Frank Terletzki
- Gert Heidler
- Gerd Weber
- Hans-Jürgen Dörner
- Hans-Jürgen Kreische
- Hans-Jürgen Riediger
- Hartmut Schade
- Norbert Trieloff
- Reinhard Häfner
- Reinhard Lauck
- Siegmar Wätzlich
- Wolf-Rüdiger Netz

=== Speed skating ===
- Andre Hoffmann
- Angela Stahnke
- Helga Haase
- Karin Kessow
- Ruth Schleiermacher
- Sabine Brehm
- Sabine Becker
- Sylvia Albrecht
- Uwe Jens Mey

=== Swimming ===
- Andre Matzk
- Andrea Eife
- Caren Metschuck
- Detlev Grabs
- Evelyn Stolze
- Frank Pfütze
- Peter Bruch
- Jörg Woithe
- Jürgen Schütze
- Katrin Meissner
- Kerstin Kielgaß
- Lars Hinneburg
- Lutz Unger
- Manuela Stellmach
- Rosemarie Gabriel
- Roswitha Beier
- Roswitha Krause
- Steffen Zesner
- Sven Lodziewski
- Sylvia Gerasch
- Ursula Küper

=== Volleyball ===
- Anke Westendorf
- Ariane Radfan
- Barbara Czekalla
- Christine Mummhardt
- Heike Lehmann
- Manuela Groß
- Wolfgang Webner
- Schwarz
- Katharina Bullin

=== Water polo ===
- Hans-Georg Fehn
- Hans-Ulrich Lange
- Jürgen Kluge
- Jürgen Schüler
- Rolf Bastel
- Siegfried Ballerstedt
- Wolfgang Zein

=== Wrestling ===
- Dieter Heuer
- Fred Hempel
- Gerald Brauer
- Hans-Dieter Brüchert
- Harald Büttner
- Karl-Heinz Stahr
- Karl Nitz
- Karsten Polky
- Klaus Pohl
- Roland Gehrke
- Roland Dudziak
- Torsten Wagner
- Uwe Westendorf

== See also ==
- List of Dynamo sports society athletes
