= Christa (given name) =

- Pronunciation: English: /ˈkrɪs.tə/
- Gender: Female

Origin
- Origin: Greek

Christa is a female given name, a diminutive of Christine.

Notable people with the name include:

- Christa Ackroyd (born 1957), British television and radio presenter
- Christa B. Allen (born 1991), American child actress
- Christa Anbeek (born 1961), Dutch theologist, professor and rector of the Remonstrants seminary
- Christa Bäckman (born 1962), Swedish archer
- Christa Bauch (born 1947), German professional bodybuilder
- Christa Beran (1922–1992), Austrian Righteous Among the Nations
- Christa Blanke (born 1948), German Lutheran theologian and animal welfare activist
- Christa Bonhoff, German opera singer
- Christa Borden (21st century), Canadian pop singer
- Christa Bortignon (born 1937), Canadian masters athlete
- Christa Brosseau, Canadian chemist
- Christa Brown, American lawyer, author, and clergy sexual abuse victim advocate
- Christa Calamas (21st century), former Secretary of the Florida Agency for HCA
- Christa Campbell (born 1973), American actress and model
- Christa Castro, Honduran politician
- Christa Collins (born 1979), American singer, dancer, model and songwriter
- Christa Couture, Canadian broadcaster, musician, and writer
- Christa Cowrie (born 1949), German-Mexican photographer
- Christa Czekay (1944–2017), West German sprinter
- Christa L. Deeleman-Reinhold (born 1930), Dutch arachnologist
- Christa Deguchi (born 1995), Canadian judoka
- Christa Dichgans (1940–2018), German painter
- Christa D'Souza (born 1960), British journalist
- Christa Dürscheid (born 1959), German linguist and academic
- Christa Ehrmann-Hämmerle (born 1957), Austrian historian
- Christa Eka, Cameroonian film actress
- Christa Faust (born 1969), American author
- Christa Fontana (20th century), Italian luger
- Christa Fouché, New Zealand academic
- Christa Gannon (20th century), American basketball player
- Christa Gietl (born 1977), Italian luger
- Christa Goetsch (born 1952), German politician
- Christa Göhler (1935–2010), German cross-country skier
- Christa Harmotto (born 1986), American volleyball player
- Christa Hughes (21st century), Australian singer
- Christa Jaarsma (born 1952), Dutch speed skater
- Christa Jansohn (born 1958), German academic
- Christa Johnson (born 1958), American golfer
- Christa Kinshofer (born 1961), German alpine skier
- Christa Klaß (born 1951), German politician
- Christa Klecker (20th century), Austrian luger
- Christa Köhler (born 1951), East German diver
- Christa Krammer (born 1944), Austrian politician
- Christa Lang (1943–2026), German-American actress and screenwriter
- Christa Lehmann (born 1923), German serial killer
- Christa Linder (born 1943), German actress
- Christa Luding-Rothenburger (born 1959), German speed skater and track cyclist
- Christa Ludwig (1928–2021), German opera singer
- Christa Luft (born 1938), German economist and politician
- Christa Markwalder (born 1975), Swiss politician
- Christa Mayer, German opera singer
- Christa C. Mayer Thurman (born 1934), German-born American curator, art historian
- Christa McAuliffe (1948–1986), American teacher and astronaut
- Christa Merten (1944–1986), German long-distance runner
- Christa Miller (born 1964), American actress
- Christa Mulack (1943–2021), German educator
- Christa Muth (born 1949), German systems scientist, management professor and management consultant
- Christa Neuper (born 1958), Austrian psychologist
- Christa Nickels (born 1952), German politician
- Christa Öckl (born 1943), German archer
- Christa Perathoner (born 1987), Italian biathlete
- Christa Peters (1933–1981), German fashion photographer
- Christa Päffgen (1938–1988), German fashion model, later actress & singer known as Nico
- Christa Pike (born 1976), American murderer
- Christa Prets (born 1947), Austrian politician
- Christa Randzio-Plath (born 1940), German lawyer
- Christa Reinig (1926–2008), German poet, writer and dramatist
- Christa Riffel (born 1998), German racing cyclist
- Christa Rigozzi (born 1983), Miss Switzerland 2006
- Christa Ruppert (1935–2010), German-born Portuguese violinist
- Christa Sammler (born 1932), German sculptor
- Christa Sauls (born 1972), American model and actress
- Christa Schmidt (born 1941), German politician
- Christa Schroeder (1908–1984), one of Nazi dictator Adolf Hitler’s personal secretaries
- Christa Schumann-Lottmann (born 1964), Guatemalan sprinter
- Christa Siems (1916–1990), German actress
- Christa Simmons (born 1985), Guyanese beauty pageant winner
- Christa Speck (1942–2013), German model and actress
- Christa Staak (21st century), German rower
- Christa Striezel (born 1949), German long jumper
- Christa Stubnick (1933–2021), East German athlete
- Christa Théret (born 1991), French actress
- Christa Tordy (1904–1945), German actress
- Christa Agnes Tuczay (born 1952), Austrian university professor
- Christa Vahlensieck (born 1949), German long-distance runner
- Christa Frieda Vogel (born 1960), German photographer
- Christa von Szabó, Austrian figure skater
- Christa Wells (born 1973), American singer-songwriter
- Christa Wiese (born 1967), German shot putter
- Christa Williams (1926–2012), German pop singer
- Christa Williams (softball) (born 1978), American softball player
- Christa Winsloe (1888–1944), German novelist, playwright and sculptor
- Christa Wolf (1929–2011), German literary critic, novelist, and essayist
- Christa Worthington (1956–2002), American fashion writer
- Christa Zechmeister (born 1957), German alpine skier
