= Gomolko =

Gomolko is a surname. Notable people with the surname include:

- Nikolay Gomolko (born 1938), Russian rower
- Tatyana Gomolko (born 1940), Russian rower, wife of Nikolay
