= List of the national championships of the SV Dynamo =

National championships of SV Dynamo

With 280,000 members, it is not surprising that the SV Dynamo multi-sport club has won 2.187 championships in the GDR, so that a separate category should be needed.

== List ==
=== Acrobatics (Zircus) ===
The acrobats won 13 titles.

- Ladies: 1980, 1976, 1970
- Group ladies: 1980, 1981, 1982, 1985
- Mixed ladies: 1980, 1981, 1982
- Gentlemen: 1975
- Pair gentlemen: 1980
- Group gentlemen: 1965

=== Artistic roller skating ===
The roller skaters won 2 titles.

- Gentlemen: 1956
- Artistic roller skating (Dancing) ladies: 1956

=== Athletics (track and field) men ===

The men won over 212 championships in athletics (track and field).

- 1500 metres: 1967
- 5000 metres: 1988
- 100 metres: 1969, 1973, 1988, 1989
- 200 metres: 1969, 1973, 1974
- 400 metres: 1953, 1954, 1957, 1958, 1960, 1961, 1962, 1963, 1964, 1965, 1977
- Racewalking 25000 metres: 1954, 1955
- 110 metre hurdles: 1962, 1963, 1964, 1965, 1987
- 200 metre hurdles: 1965
- 400 metre hurdles: 1960, 1968,
- Steeplechase (athletics) 3000m: 1982, 1984
- 4 × 100 metres relay: 1949, 1952, 1969, 1972, 1973, 1980, 1982, 1984, 1989
- 4 × 200 metres relay: 1968
- Racewalking 20 km team: 1955, 1956, 1958, 1962
- Racewalking 10 km: 1953
- Racewalking 20 km: 1955, 1962, 1967, 1972, 1977, 1978, 1982
- Racewalking 25 km team: 1954
- Racewalking 35 km: 1964, 1965
- Racewalking 35 km team: 1964
- Racewalking 50 km men: 1952, 1954, 1955, 1956, 1957, 1958, 1960, 1963, 1964, 1965, 1966, 1967, 1967, 1968, 1969, 1970, 1973, 1975, 1976
- Racewalking 50 km team: 1951, 1952, 1953, 1954, 1955, 1956, 1957, 1958, 1959, 1960, 1962, 1963, 1964, 1965
- Marathon: 1955, 1971, 1977, 1988
- Marathon team: 1955, 1956, 1957, 1963
- High jump: 1967, 1968
- Pole vault: 1984, 1985
- Long jump: 1951, 1960, 1961, 1962, 1964, 1967, 1968, 1969, 1970, 1981, 1982, 1986, 1987, 1988, 1989
- Triple jump: 1957, 1960, 1964, 1968, 1973, 1987, 1990
- Shot put: 1969, 1970, 1971, 1972, 1973, 1974, 1975, 1976
- Discus throw: 1967, 1970, 1972, 1975, 1976, 1977, 1978, 1979, 1980
- Javelin throw: 1961, 1962
- Hammer throw: 1985
- 4 × 800 metres relay: 1966
- Cross 7 km: 1976, 1981, 1983, 1987
- Cross 12 km: 1988
- Heptathlon modern single: 1965, 1966, 1967, 1968

==== Athletics (track and field) at the gym ====
- 60m : 1988
- 400 metres : 1964, 1965, 1971, 1989
- 800 metres : 1967, 1983, 1984
- 1500 metres : 1982, 1983, 1984
- 3000 metres : 1982, 1988
- 5000 metres : 1984, 1985, 1986
- 4x2 Rounds: 1964, 1973
- 4 × 400 metres relay: 1964
- Racewalking 20 km: 1976, 1982
- 60 metres hurdling 20 km: 1964, 1965, 1987, 1988
- High jump: 1964, 1969
- Pole vault: 1967, 1968, 1984, 1985, 1986, 1987, 1988
- Long jump: 1965, 1966, 1967, 1968, 1969, 1970, 1978, 1987, 1988
- Triple jump: 1964, 1968, 1973, 1981
- Shot put: 1967, 1969, 1970, 1971, 1972, 1973, 1974, 1976
- Octathlon: 1975

==== Athletics (track and field) ladies ====
The ladies won over 196 titles.

- 100 metres: 1953, 1954, 1956, 1957, 1958, 1959, 1960, 1966
- 200 metres: 1953, 1954, 1956, 1957, 1958, 1959, 1960, 1966, 1967
- 400 metres: 1958, 1959, 1961, 1962, 1970, 1972, 1973, 1979
- 800 metres: 1968
- 1500 metres: 1981, 1988
- 3000 metres: 1987, 1988, 1989, 1990
- 10000 metres: 1987, 1988, 1989, 1990
- 80 metres hurdles: 1948 1956, 1957, 1958, 1959, 1960, 1961
- 100 metres hurdles: 1967, 1968, 1984, 1986, 1988, 1989
- 400 metres hurdles: 1989
- Racewalking: 10 km 1986
- 4 × 100 metres relay: 1956, 1957, 1958, 1959, 1960, 1961, 1962, 1963, 1964, 1965
- 4 × 200 metres relay: 1961, 1962, 1963, 1964, 1965, 1966, 1967
- 4 × 400 metres relay: 1969, 1972, 1975, 1976
- High jump: 1978, 1983, 1985, 1987
- Long jump: 1954, 1956, 1960, 1961, 1962, 1964, 1977
- Shot put: 1952, 1953, 1974, 1975, 1976, 1977, 1979, 1980, 1981, 1982, 1983, 1984, 1987, 1989, 1990
- Javelin throw: 1957, 1958, 1959, 1974
- Heptathlon: 1956, 1957, 1960, 1961, 1985
- 80 metres hurdles: 1948, 1950, 1952, 1956, 1957, 1958, 1959, 1959, 1960, 1961
- 100 metres hurdles: 1967, 1968, 1984, 1985, 1986, 1988, 1989
- 400 metres hurdles: 1981, 1982, 1983, 1989
- Cross 3 km team: 1964

===== Athletics (track and field) at the gym =====
- 60 metres: 1966, 1968, 1969, 1976
- 100 metres: 1976
- 400 metres: 1966, 1967, 1968, 1969, 1971, 1972
- 800 metres: 1968, 1977, 1983
- 1500 metres: 1971, 1974, 1981, 1983, 1988
- 3000 metres: 1981, 1982, 1983, 1984, 1988, 1989
- 60 metres hurdles: 1984, 1985, 1986, 1987, 1988, 1989
- 4x 1 Round: 1964, 1965, 1966, 1967, 1968, 1973
- High jump: 1966, 1978, 1984, 1987
- Long jump: 1980, 1989
- Shot put: 1972, 1974, 1975, 1976, 1977, 1979, 1980, 1981, 1985, 1986, 1987, 1989
- Heptathlon: 1985, 1987

==== Biathlon ====
Biathletes won 45 titles.

- Biathlon (20km) single men: 1960, 1961, 1963, 1964, 1968, 1969, 1970, 1971, 1974, 1977, 1978, 1979, 1980, 1985, 1987, 1988
- Biathlon (10km) single men: 1977, 1978, 1980, 1983, 1985, 1987, 1989
- Biathlon 4x 7,5km relay men:' 1965, 1967, 1968, 1969, 1970, 1971, 1974, 1957, 1976, 1977, 1978, 1979, 1980, 1983, 1984, 1985, 1986, 1988, 1989
- Biathlon club women and men: 1960, 1963, 1964

==== Bobsleigh ====

Bobsleighers won a single title.

- Duo: 1956

==== Boxing ====

Boxers won 71 titles.

- Super Flyweight men: 1967
- Flyweight men: 1956, 1957, 1970, 1971, 1972, 1980, 1981, 1982
- Featherweight men: 1949, 1950, 1953, 1955, 1956, 1965
- Lightweight men: 1956, 1958, 1960
- Half Welterweight men: 1958, 1966, 1967, 1968, 1969, 1970, 1978, 1987
- Welterweight men: 1979
- Light heavyweight men: 1961, 1962, 1972, 1974, 1975, 1980
- Middleweight men: 1956, 1965, 1967, 1972, 1973, 1974, 1975, 1976
- Light heavyweight men: 1951, 1954, 1961, 1962, 1963
- Heavyweight men: 1954, 1961, 1962, 1963, 1979
- Super Heavyweight men: 1989
- Club:' 1966, 1967, 1968
- Light flyweight men: 1967
- Flyweight men: 1956, 1970, 1971, 1972
- Bantamweight men: 1956, 1958, 1959, 1961, 1963, 1964, 1966, 1982, 1983, 1984, 1985

==== Cross-country skiing ====
The cross-county skiers won 90 titles.

- Cross-country skiing 5 km ladies: 1971, 1978
- Cross-country skiing 10 km ladies: 1955, 1956, 1957, 1958, 1959, 1962, 1964, 1967, 1969, 1970, 1971, 1972, 1978
- Cross-country skiing 30 km ladies: 1985
- Cross-country skiing 4 x 5 km relay ladies: 1956, 1958, 1959, 1960, 1962, 1965, 1970, 1971,
- Cross-country skiing 10 km team ladies: 1969, 1970
- Cross-country skiing 15 km gentlemen: 1959, 1962, 1963, 1964, 1965, 1968, 1973, 1976, 1977, 1978, 1980, 1981, 1982, 1983, 1984, 1985
- Cross-country skiing 30 km gentlemen: 1961, 1962, 1963, 1964, 1966, 1968, 1969, 1973, 1976, 1977, 1979, 1980, 1982, 1984
- Cross-country skiing 50 km gentlemen: 1958, 1959, 1962, 1966, 1969, 1972, 1975, 1976, 1977, 1982, 1983, 1984, 1987, 1989
- Cross-country skiing 4 x 10 km relay gentlemen: 1960, 1961, 1962, 1963, 1964, 1966, 1967, 1968, 1969, 1971, 1974, 1975, 1976, 1977, 1978, 1979, 1980, 1981, 1982, 1984
- Cross-country skiing 15 km team gentlemen: 1969, 1970

==== Cycling ====
Cyclists won 53 titles.

- Madison (cycling) men: 1960, 1964, 1968, 1970, 1971, 1972
- Miss and Out men: 1963, 1967, 1968, 1969, 1982, 1983, 1986, 1987, 1988
- Team pursuit men: 1955, 1956, 1957, 1959, 1967, 1968, 1970, 1981
- Track cycling ladies 3000 m: 1984
- Points race men: 1989
- Individual pursuit women 1959,
- Sprint cycling women 1960, 1961
- Sprint (cycling) men: 1976, 1977, 1989
- Individual pursuit men: 1960, 1964, 1968, 1970, 1972
- Track time trial men 1000 m: 1979
- Individual pursuit men 4000 m: 1987

==== Individual pursuit ladies 3000 m: 1984 ====
- Team pursuit men 4000 m: 1981
- Tandem men: 1956, 1957, 1968, 1969, 1970, 1971
- Track time trial men: 1970
- Road bicycle racing team men 100 km: 1961, 1962, 1963, 1964, 1970
- Criterium men: 1970, 1977, 1979

==== Fencing ====

Fencers won 106 titles.

- Foil (fencing) single men: 1966, 1967, 1968, 1968, 1969, 1970, 1971, 1976, 1979
- Foil (fencing) team men: 1969, 1978, 1981, 1982
- Épée single men: 1961, 1964, 1966, 1967, 1970, 1971, 1974, 1975, 1976
- Épée team men: 1959, 1969, 1974, 1975, 1979, 1980
- Sabre (fencing) single men:' 1960, 1962, 1966, 1967, 1968, 1969, 1970, 1971, 1972, 1973, 1975, 1978, 1980, 1982, 1984, 1985, 1986, 1987
- Sabre (fencing) team men:' 1968, 1969, 1973, 1974, 1975, 1976, 1977, 1978, 1979, 1980, 1981, 1982
- Foil (fencing) single ladies: 1960, 1961, 1966, 1978, 1982, 1983, 1984, 1985, 1987, 1988, 1990
- Foil (fencing) team ladies: 1958, 1959, 1975, 1977, 1972, 1982

==== Figure skating ====
Figure skaters won 31 titles.

- Single skating men: 1960, 1961, 1962, 1963, 1964, 1965, 1966, 1988
- Single skating ladies: 1960, 1974, 1975
- Pair skating: 1962, 1964, 1965, 1966, 1967, 1968, 1969, 1970, 1971, 1972, 1973, 1974, 1975, 1976, 1981, 1985, 1986, 1987
- Ice dancing: 1990

==== Gymnastics ====
Gymnasts won 110 titles.

===== Ladies =====
- Single: 1967, 1969, 1970, 1971, 1972, 1973, 1974, 1978, 1979, 1980, 1981, 1982, 1983, 1984, 1985, 1987, 1988
- Vault: 1958, 1959, 1960, 1963, 1964, 1968, 1970, 1971, 1979, 1972, 1972, 1982, 1985, 1988
- Uneven bars: 1958, 1960, 1962, 1964, 1965, 1966, 1967, 1968, 1969, 1970, 1971, 1973, 1979, 1981, 1982, 1983, 1984, 1987, 1988
- Balance beam: 1958,1959, 1960, 1961, 1962, 1963, 1969, 1972, 1979, 1980, 1982, 1983, 1985, 1988
- Floor: 1958, 1959, 1962, 1963, 1965, 1966, 1969, 1970, 1971, 1972, 1974, 1977, 1979, 1981, 1982, 1984, 1985, 1988

===== Gentlemen =====
- All: 1976, 1977, 1978, 1979, 1980, 1981
- Vault : 1975, 1977, 1979, 1980
- Pommel horse : 1976, 1977, 1978, 1979, 1980, 1982, 1985, 1986
- Floor : 1975, 1976, 1977, 1978, 1979, 1980, 1981, 1982, 1983, 1984, 1985
- Parallel bars : 1977, 1981
- Rings : 1971, 1980
- Horizontal bar: 1979, 1980, 1981, 1982, 1988

==== Handball ====

Handball teams won 9 titles.

- Gentlemen: 1951, 1952, 1967, 1969, 1971
- Gentlemen field: 1956, 1957, 1961, 1966

==== Ice hockey ====
The ice hockey teams won 38 titles in the smallest ice hockey league in the world. When the SC Dynamo Berlin was the champion, the SG Dynamo Weißwasser won the vice titles and when the SG Dynamo Weißwasser won the titles, the SC Dynamo Berlin won the vice medal.

- Men: 1953,1954 1955, 1956, 1957, 1958, 1959, 1960, 1961, 1962, 1963, 1964, 1965, 1966, 1967, 1968, 1969, 1970, 1971, 1972, 1973, 1974, 1975, 1976, 1977, 1978, 1979, 1980, 1981, 1982, 1983, 1984, 1985, 1986, 1987, 1988, 1989, 1990

==== Judo ====

Judokas won 30 titles.

- Featherweight ladies: 1979, 1984, 1986, 1987, 1988
- Lightweight 52 kg ladies: 1969, 1970, 1972, 1975, 1976, 1977, 1978, 1979
- Halfmiddleweight 56 kg ladies: 1966, 1967, 1968, 1969, 1970, 1971, 1978, 1980, 1981
- Middleweight 61 kg ladies: 1966, 1967, 1968, 1969, 1970, 1978, 1980, 1981

==== Motorsport ====

The athletes of motorsport won 74 titles.

- Enduro Grasstrack 55ccm: 1964, 1965, 1972, 1973, 1974, 1975, 1976, 1977, 1978, 1979
- Enduro Grasstrack 75ccm: 1975, 1976, 1977, 1978, 1979, 1980, 1981, 1982, 1983, 1984, 1985
- Enduro Grasstrack 125ccm: 1958
- Enduro Grasstrack 175ccm: 1972, 1973
- Motorcycle speedway single: 1967
- Motorcycle speedway team: 1969, 1970, 1971,
- Motocross 125 ccm: 1961, 1962, 1964, 1965, 1966, 1967, 1968, 1970, 1973, 1976, 1977, 1980, 1989
- Motocross 175 ccm: 1961, 1963, 1964, 1965, 1966
- Motocross 250 ccm: 1962, 1964, 1965, 1967, 1968, 1969, 1970, 1971, 1972, 1973, 1976, 1977, 1978
- Motocross 350 ccm: 1962
- Motoball team: 1978, 1979, 1980, 1981, 1982, 1983, 1984, 1985, 1986, 1987, 1988, 1989
- Touring car racing Class 13 (over 1000 ccm): 1972
- Formula Three/Class C9/Class B8 /E until 1300 ccm: 1977

==== Orienteering ====

Orienteerers won 36 titles.

- Orienteering men: 1965, 1966, 1967, 1968, 1974, 1975, 1976, 1980, 1981
- Orienteering men relay: 1965, 1968, 1972, 1973, 1975
- Orienteering ladies: 1964, 1977, 1983
- Orienteering ladies relay: 1964, 1965, 1966, 1977, 1978, 1981, 1982, 1983
- Orienteering men long distance: 1979
- Orienteering ladies night: 1979, 1980
- Ski orienteering men: 1957, 1961, 1964, 1965
- Ski orienteering ladies: 1969, 1970
- Ski orienteering men relay: 1970

==== Parachuting ====

Parachuters (women) won 64 titles.

- Alone: 1965, 1969, 1970, 1972, 1973, 1974, 1975, 1977, 1979, 1981, 1982, 1983, 1984, 1987, 1988
- Figure Jumping: 1963, 1969, 1972, 1973, 1974, 1975, 1976, 1976, 1977, 1979, 1981, 1982, 1985, 1986, 1987
- Portfolio: 1963, 1967, 1969, 1970, 1972, 1973, 1974, 1975, 1976, 1977, 1979, 1981, 1982, 1985, 1987
- Team: 1970, 1973, 1974, 1975, 1979, 1981, 1982, 1983, 1984, 1985, 1987
- Team competition: 1969, 1977, 1978, 1979, 1981, 1982, 1985, 1987

Parachuters (men) won 57 titles.

- Alone : 1963, 1965, 1965, 1969, 1971, 1972, 1973, 1978, 1981, 1982, 1983, 1984, 1985, 1987, 1988
- Team: 1965, 1967, 1971, 1972, 1973, 1974, 1975, 1976, 1977, 1981, 1985, 1987
- Portfolio : 1963, 1965, 1969, 1971, 1972, 1973, 1974, 1977, 1980, 1981, 1985, 1986, 1989
- Thickness team : 1963, 1965, 1967, 1970, 1973, 1975, 1977, 1982, 1983, 1984, 1985
- Team composition : 1963, 1965, 1969, 1977, 1985, 1987

==== Riding ====

Equestrians won 17 titles.

- Dressage single ladies: 1964
- Show jumping ladies: 1954, 1959, 1960, 1966, 1968
- Show jumping men: 1964, 1965
- Eventing men: 1954, 1959, 1960, 1963, 1967, 1968, 1970, 1971, 1972

==== Rowing ====

Rowers won 133 titles, in one of the world bests league.

- Single scull men: 1950, 1951, 1961, 1969, 1982, 1984
- Single scull ladies: 1979, 1980, 1983, 1987, 1989
- Single scull; Double men: 1960, 1962, 1970, 1971, 1975, 1976, 1978, 1984, 1989
- Coxed four (4+) men: 1962, 1966, 1971, 1973, 1980, 1981, 1983, 1984, 1985, 1986, 1987, 1988, 1989, 1990
- Quad (4x) (4-) men: 1958, 1962, 1964, 1976, 1980
- Eight (8+) men: 1963, 1964, 1970, 1971, 1973, 1974, 1975, 1978, 1979, 1980, 1986, 1987, 1988
- Eight (8+) ladies: 1953, 1957, 1965, 1966, 1968, 1973, 1974, 1975, 1976, 1978, 1986, 1987, 1988
- Coxless pairs men: 1960, 1962, 1970, 1971, 1976, 1978, 1980, 1984, 1989
- Coxed pairs ladies: 1954, 1962, 1965, 1966, 1967, 1968, 1972, 1973, 1977, 1981, 1983, 1985, 1986, 1987, 1988, 1989, 1990
- Coxless pairs ladies: 1976, 1980, 1985, 1988, 1989
- Coxed pairs men: 1961, 1970, 1982, 1986, 1988, 1989, 1990
- Coxed four (4+) ladies: 1953, 1954, 1954, 1964, 1965, 1966, 1967, 1968, 1969, 1963, 1974, 1975, 1976, 1978, 1979, 1981, 1982, 1983, 1986, 1987, 1987, 1988, 1989, 1990
- Coxless fours (4-) ladies: 1990
- Double (2x) men: 1956, 1962, 1974, 1977, 1978, 1979, 1980, 1981, 1989, 1990

==== Rhythmic gymnastics ====
The athletes in rhythmic gymnastics won 1 title

- Without device: 1971

==== Sailing ====

The sailors won 5 titles.

- Gentlemen (pirate-class): 1963, 1966
- Ladies (pirate-class): 1984
- 15-qm-Jolle cruiser: 1970, 1984

==== Shooting sports ====

Men and women shooters won 124 titles.

- Free .22 Long Rifle-can, 3x40 shot, : 1969, 1977, 1988
- Free .22 long rifle-can, firinglying to 40,: 1960
- Free .22 long rifle-can, 40 firingkneeling,: 1960, 1966, 1969, 1970
- Free .22 long rifle-can, firingstanding for 40: 1969
- Free .22 long rifle-can, 3x20 shot: 1973
- Free .22 long rifle-can, 3x40 shot, crew: 1964 1969
- Free .22 long rifle-can, 40 firingkneeling, crew: 1969 1970
- Free .22 long rifle-can, firingstanding for 40, crew: 1964
- Free .22 long rifle-can, firinglying to 60, crew: 1963, 1964, 1969, 1970
- Free .22 long rifle-can, firingstanding for 40, crew: 1964
- Free rifle, 3x40 shot: 1974
- Free rifle, firinglying to 40: 1961, 1963, 1967, 1968, 1969, 1970, 1971
- Free rifle, 40 firingkneeling: 1966, 1967, 1968
- Free rifle, 3x40 shot, crew: 1963, 1964, 1970
- .22 long rifle-standard rifle, 3x 20 shot: 1969, 1973
- .22 long rifle-standard rifle, 3x 20 shot, crew: 1969
- Army rifle, 3x20 shot: 1955, 1957, 1958
- Army rifle, 3x20 shot, crew: 1955, 1956, 1963, 1974
- Free pistol, 60 shot: 1955, 1956, 1961, 1965
- Free pistol, 60 shot, crew: 1958, 1960, 1964, 1969
- .22 Long Rifle-machine pistol, 60 shot, /Olympic high-speed fires: 1959, 1967, 1969, 1970, 1971, 1979, 1987
- .22 Long Rifle-machine pistol, 60 shot, crew: 1959, 1963, 1965
- Large caliber pistol (gun), 60 shot: 1956, 1957, 1960, 1961, 1965, 1967, 1970, 1974
- Large caliber pistol (gun), 60 shot, crew: 1956, 1958, 1959, 1960, 1961, 1962, 1963, 1964, 1965, 1967, 1968, 1969, 1970
- Throw-pigeon-shoot, Trap: 1967, 1971, 1972, 1973, 1974, 1979, 1980, 1982, 1983, 1984, 1985, 1986, 1987, 1988
- Throw-pigeon-shoot, Skeet: 1979 1986
- Air rifle, firingstanding for 40: 1965, 1966, 1978, 1979, 1980, 1989

==== Shooting sports ladies ====
The shooting ladies won 22 titles.

- .22 long standard can, 3x20 shot: 1955
- .22 long standard can, firinglying to 30: 1960, 1961, 1963
- .22 long standard can standard, firinglying for 60: 1960, 1963
- .22 long standard rifle, 3x 20 shots: 1972, 1977, 1988, 1989
- .22 long standard rifle, 3x 20 shots team: 1983
- .22 long standard rifle, 60 shots: 1972, 1975, 1977, 1978, 1979,
- air rifle, 60 shots: 1975, 1981, 1990
- air gun: 1971, 1972, 1973

==== Ski alpin ====
The skiers won 22 titles.

- downhill ladies: 1956, 1961, 1962
- Slalom skiing ladies: 1961, 1962
- Giant slalom skiing ladies: 1957, 1958, 1959, 1961, 1962
- Alpine skiing combined ladies: 1956, 1957, 1958, 1958, 1959, 1961, 1962
- Downhill gentlemen: 1961
- Giant slalom skiing gentlemen: 1959, 1970, 1973
- Alpine skiing combined gentlemen: 1962

==== Ski Nordic / Nordic combined ====
The Dynamo-Athletes won in ski Nordic 23 titles.

- Nordic combined gentlemen: 1956, 1957, 1958, 1959, 1960, 1961, 1962, 1963, 1965, 1967, 1968, 1970, 1974, 1981, 1983, 1984, 1985, 1986
- Nordic combined ladies: 1970, 1986, 1987, 1988, 1989

==== Ski jumping ====
16 titles won the ski jumpers.

- special jump gentlemen: 1956, 1958
- normal ski jumping hill gentlemen: 1968, 1982, 1983, 1984, 1987
- big ski jumping hill gentlemen: 1966, 1977, 1980, 1981, 1982, 1987, 1988
- ski jumping hill team: 1967, 1987

==== Skittles (sport) ====
The skittlers won 2 titles.

- Sektion Board- Gentlemen: 1979, 1990

==== Soccer ====

Football teams won 18 titles and 15 won in a row.

- Men: 1953, 1971, 1973, 1976, 1977, 1978, 1979, 1980, 1981, 1982, 1983, 1984, 1985, 1986, 1987, 1988, 1989, 1990

==== Speedskating ====

Speedskaters won 121 titles.

- Team pursuit gentlemen: 1954, 1955, 1957, 1958, 1960, 1962, 1963, 1965, 1968, 1970, 1978, 1983
- Team pursuit ladies: 1957, 1958, 1960, 1961, 1962, 1963, 1964, 1965, 1966, 1966, 1967, 1968, 1970, 1975, 1978
- Team pursuit sprint gentlemen: 1984, 1986
- Team pursuit sprint ladies: 1973, 1974, 1975, 1979
- Single distance 500m ladies: 1964, 1965, 1967, 1968, 1968, 1969, 1970, 1971, 1972, 1976, 1979
- Single distance 1000m ladies: 1964, 1965, 1966, 1967, 1968, 1969, 1970, 1971, 1972, 1979, 1989
- Single distance 1500m ladies: 1964, 1965, 1966, 1967, 1968, 1969, 1970, 1971, 1972, 1979, 1980
- Single distance 3000m ladies: 1964, 1965, 1966, 1967, 1968, 1969, 1970, 1971, 1972, 1980, 1984
- Single distance 500m gentlemen: 1964, 1965, 1970, 1971, 1972, 1983, 1984, 1986, 1987, 1989
- Single distance 1000m gentlemen: 1980, 1983, 1984, 1985, 1986, 1987, 1988, 1989
- Single distance 1500m gentlemen: 1964, 1965, 1968, 1971, 1980, 1984, 1985, 1986, 1987, 1988, 1989
- Single distance 5000m gentlemen: 1965, 1967, 1968, 1970, 1971, 1972, 1980
- Single distance 10000m gentlemen: 1964, 1965, 1966, 1967, 1968, 1969, 1970, 1971, 1972

==== Swimming ladies ====

76 titles won the swimming ladies.

- 50m freestyle: 1983, 1985, 1987, 1988, 1989, 1990
- 100m freestyle: 1977, 1978, 1979, 1981, 1983, 1989, 1990
- 200m freestyle: 1972, 1973, 1977, 1978, 1979, 1980, 1981, 1982, 1989, 1990
- 400m freestyle: 1972, 1973, 1976
- 4 × 100m freestyle relay: 1975, 1976, 1977, 1978, 1979, 1982, 1983, 1984, 1985, 1987, 1988, 1989
- 4 × 200m freestyle relay: 1985, 1986, 1987, 1989, 1990
- 100m breaststroke: 1967, 1969, 1976, 1985
- 200m breaststroke: 1958, 1976, 1990
- 4 × 200m breaststroke relay: 1959
- 100m butterfly: 1972, 1977, 1978, 1979, 1980
- 100m butterfly: 1972, 1977, 1978, 1979, 1980
- 200m medley: 1972, 1973, 1974, 1975, 1976, 1978, 1980
- 400m medley: 1970, 1972, 1988
- 4 × 100m medley: 1976, 1977, 1978, 1979, 1990

==== Swimming men ====
98 titles won the swimmers.

- 50m freestyle: 1982, 1983, 1985, 1986, 1990
- 100m freestyle: 1979, 1980, 1981, 1982, 1983, 1984 1985, 1986, 1987, 1988, 1990
- 200m freestyle: 1970, 1977, 1979, 1980, 1981, 1983, 1984, 1985, 1986, 1987, 1990
- 400m freestyle: 1976, 1977, 1979, 1982, 1983, 1984
- 1500m freestyle: 1961, 1968, 1974, 1977, 1982, 1984, 1986
- 100m breast: 1973, 1985, 1986, 1987, 1988
- 200m breast: 1964, 1973, 1975, 1981, 1983, 1984, 1985, 1986, 1987, 1988, 1990
- 4 × 100m relay freestyle: 1973, 1979, 1980, 1981, 1982, 1983, 1984, 1985, 1986, 1987, 1988, 1989, 1990
- 4 × 200m relay freestyle: 1970, 1977, 1978, 1979, 1980, 1981, 1982, 1983, 1958, 1986, 1987, 1988
- 100m butterfly: 1982, 1983
- 200m butterfly: 1989
- 200m backstroke: 1976, 1977
- 100m lagen: 1987, 1988, 1989, 1990
- 400m lagen: 1976
- 4 × 100m medley: 1970, 1973, 1984, 1985, 1987, 1989, 1990

==== Volleyball ====
Volleyball teams won 25 titles.

- Ladies: 1962, 1963, 1964, 1965, 1966, 1968, 1969, 1972, 1973, 1974, 1975, 1978, 1979, 1985, 1986, 1986, 1987, 1988, 1989, 1990
- Gentlemen: 1961, 1978, 1979, 1980, 1990

==== Water polo ====
Water polo teams won 17 titles.

- League: 1958, 1959, 1960, 1961, 1962, 1963, 1964, 1965, 1966, 1967, 1968, 1969, 1970, 1971, 1972, 1973, 1977

==== Weightlifting ====
Weightlifters won 9 titles.

- Flyweight three-event/two-event gentlemen: 1969, 1971
- Flyweight press gentlemen: 1969, 1971
- Flyweight snatch gentlemen: 1969
- Flyweight strike gentlemen: 1969, 1971
- Middleweight three-event/two-event gentlemen:1953
- Club: 1971

==== Wrestling ====

The wrestler won 168 titles.

- Half Flyweight (Freestyle wrestling): 1975, 1977, 1978, 1979, 1981, 1985, 1986
- Flyweight (Freestyle wrestling): 1981, 1983, 1984, 1985, 1986
- Bantamweight (Freestyle wrestling): 1968, 1969, 1970, 1972, 1974, 1975, 1978, 1982
- Featherweight (Freestyle wrestling): 1972, 1973, 1975, 1977, 1986, 1987
- Lightweight (Freestyle wrestling): 1968, 1970, 1971, 1972, 1973, 1974, 1986, 1988
- Welterweight (Freestyle wrestling): 1971, 1972, 1973, 1974, 1975, 1977, 1977, 1979, 1981, 1982, 1983, 1986, 1988
- Middleweight (Freestyle wrestling): 1954, 1962, 1968, 1969, 1972, 1973, 1974, 1975, 1976, 1978, 1983, 1985, 1986, 1987
- Light heavyweight (Freestyle wrestling): 1970, 1976, 1988
- Heavyweight (Freestyle wrestling): 1962, 1963, 1966, 1974, 1975, 1976, 1977, 1978, 1979, 1980, 1981, 1981, 1982, 1983, 1984, 1987
- Super Heavyweight (Freestyle wrestling): 1969, 1970, 1974, 1975, 1976, 1977, 1978, 1978, 1979, 1980
- Team (Freestyle wrestling): 1972, 1973, 1974, 1976, 1977, 1980, 1987
- Half Flyweight (Greco-Roman wrestling): 1969, 1973, 1974, 1975, 1979,
- Flyweight (Greco-Roman wrestling): 1966, 1968, 1970, 1971, 1972, 1974, 1976, 1977, 1982
- Bantamweight (Greco-Roman wrestling): 1968, 1969, 1971, 1975, 1982, 1985
- Featherweight (Greco-Roman wrestling): 1970, 1973, 1974, 1975, 1976, 1977, 1978, 1988
- Lightweight (Greco-Roman wrestling): 1964, 1965, 1966, 1968,
- Welterweight (Greco-Roman wrestling): 1969, 1970, 1971, 1972, 1975, 1980, 1987, 1988,
- Middleweight (Greco-Roman wrestling): 1969, 1980, 1981, 1982
- Half heavyweight (Greco-Roman wrestling): 1969, 1970, 1972, 1974, 1975,
- Heavyweight (Greco-Roman wrestling): 1958, 1962, 1963, 1964, 1965, 1967, 1979, 1981, 1987, 1988
- Super Heavyweight (Greco-Roman wrestling): 1969, 1985, 1986, 1987, 1988
- Team (Greco-Roman wrestling): 1968, 1970, 1971, 1972, 1973, 1976, 1984

== See also ==
- List of Dynamo sports society athletes
- List of international winning SV Dynamo sports club athletes
