= Renate Boesler =

East German rower

Personal information
- Years active: 1963–1971
- Spouse: Wolfgang Gunkel
- Relatives: Petra Boesler (niece); Martina Boesler (niece)

Sport
- Sport: Rowing
- Club: Berliner TSC
Medal record
Women's rowing
Representing East Germany
European Rowing Championships
Silver medal – second place	1963 Moscow	Coxed quad sculls
Gold medal – first place	1964 Amsterdam	Coxed quad sculls
Silver medal – second place	1967 Vichy	Eight
Gold medal – first place	1968 Berlin	Eight
Gold medal – first place	1969 Klagenfurt	Eight
Gold medal – first place	1970 Tata	Eight
Silver medal – second place	1971 Copenhagen	Eight

Renate Boesler, also referred to as Bösler and later as Gunkel, is a retired East German rower who won medals at European championships between 1963 and 1971. During that time, she became European Champion four times in two different boat classes.

== Rowing career ==
At the 1963 European Rowing Championships in Moscow, she won a silver medal in the coxed quad sculls event with a team from Berliner TSC. At the 1964 European Rowing Championships in Amsterdam, she won a gold medal in the same boat class but with different team members apart from Antje Thiess; this time the rowers came from several clubs. Since women's rowing had formally become a part of the European Rowing Championships in 1954, this was only the second time that East Germany had won this boat class (the previous occasion had been in 1960), with all other titles having gone to the Soviet Union. The team remained in the same composition for the 1965 rowing season and at the annual regatta for Eastern Bloc countries held at the Grünau Regatta Course, the coxed quad scull team beat the boat from the Soviet Union by two lengths. All East German teams stayed away from the 1965 European Rowing Championships held in Duisburg, West Germany.

At the 1967 European Rowing Championships in Vichy, Boesler competed with the women's eight and won a silver medal. At the 1968 European Rowing Championships in East Berlin, Boesler won a gold medal with the women's eight. At the 1969 European Rowing Championships in Klagenfurt, the East German women's eight competed with its success and retained their European Championship title. The 1970 European Rowing Championships were held in Tata, Hungary, and the East German women's eight became European Champion for the third year running. At the 1971 European Rowing Championships in Copenhagen, Boesler was again part of the women's eight and this time, the team won a silver medal. Throughout her rowing career, she started for the Berliner TSC. She retired after the 1972 rowing season and was celebrated alongside other retiring international rowers in May 1973.

== Awards ==
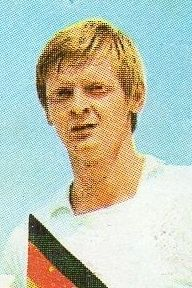
Wolfgang Gunkel, her husband, in 1972

In December 1963, Boesler was given the honorary award Master of Sport alongside her four team mates from Berliner TSC. Three of the rowers of the women's eight who won European gold in 1968 and 1969 were awarded the Medal of Merit of the GDR in January 1970: Boesler, Ursula Pankraths, and Renate Schlenzig. In September 1970, six rowers of women's eight were awarded a Patriotic Order of Merit in bronze for winning three consecutive world championship titles since 1968: Gudrun Apelt, Barbara Behrend, Marita Berndt, Gabriele Rotermund, Renate Schlenzig, and Boesler.

== Family ==
Boesler is the aunt of sisters Petra and Martina Boesler. Both her nieces have won Olympic rowing medals. Some time between August 1971 and May 1973, Boesler married fellow international rower Wolfgang Gunkel.
