= Bauschke =

Bauschke is a surname. Notable people with the surname include:

- Erhard Bauschke (1912–1945), German jazz and light music performer and bandleader
- Karin Bauschke, German rower and coxswain
- Melanie Bauschke (born 1988), German long-jump athlete
