= Anbeek =

Anbeek is a surname. Notable people with the surname include:

- Christa Anbeek (born 1961), Dutch theologist
- Dirk Anbeek (born 1963), Dutch corporate executive and football administrator
