= Petra Boesler =

German rower

Personal information
- Born: 19 September 1955 (age 70) Berlin
- Height: 174 cm (5 ft 9 in)
- Weight: 69 kg (152 lb)
- Relatives: Martina Boesler (sister); Renate Boesler (aunt); Wolfgang Gunkel (uncle)

Sport
- Sport: Rowing
Medal record
Women's rowing
Representing East Germany
Olympic Games
Silver medal – second place	1976 Montreal	Double sculls
World Rowing Championships
Silver medal – second place	1975 Nottingham	Double sculls
Gold medal – first place	1977 Amsterdam	Coxed quad sculls

Petra Boesler (later Wach, born 19 September 1955) is a German rower who competed for East Germany in the 1976 Summer Olympics.

She was born in Berlin. She is the sister of Martina Boesler, who is also an Olympic rower. Their aunt, Renate Boesler, won several medals at European Rowing Championships. Her aunt got her interested in rowing by taking her to regattas. Her aunt is married to the Olympic rower Wolfgang Gunkel.

In 1976 she and her partner Sabine Jahn won the silver medal in the double sculls event. In February 1978, she was given the sports awards Honored Master of Sports.
