= Rottermund =

Family name

Coat of arms of the Rottermund family

Rottermund, initially and in Prussia also Rotermund, is the name of a Polish noble family originally from Bohemia, which was itself mainly Galicia and Volhynia German extraction. The family later spread, some with the title of count, to Austria, Russia, and Belgium. Branches of the family exist today.

== See also ==
- Beate Uhse-Rotermund (1919–2001), German pilot and entrepreneur
- Gabriele Rotermund, German rower
