= Rosemarie Lorenz =

East German rower

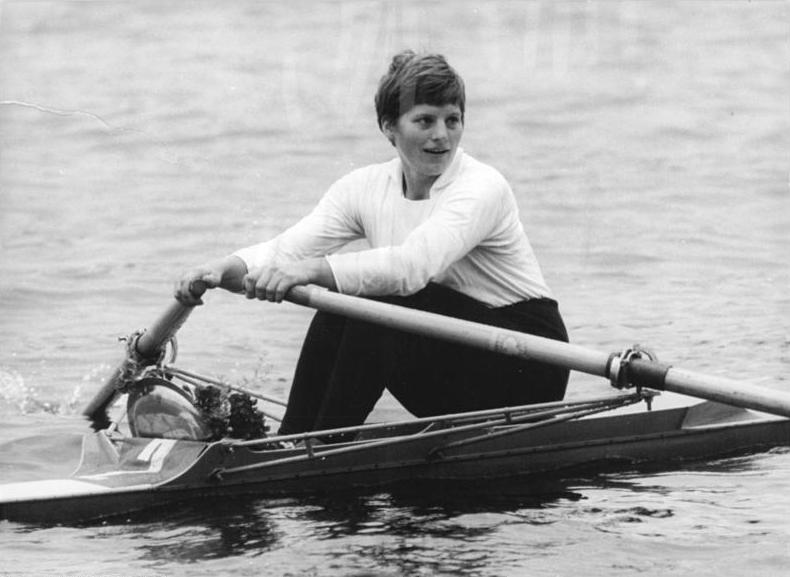
- Rosemarie Schmidtke in 1965

Personal information
- Born: 1943 or 1944 (age 82–83)

Sport
- Sport: Rowing
- Club: TSC Berlin
Medal record
Representing East Germany
European Rowing Championships
Silver medal – second place	1967 Vichy	Eight
Gold medal – first place	1968 East Berlin	Eight
Gold medal – first place	1969 Klagenfurt	Eight

Rosemarie Lorenz (née Schmidtke; born 1943/1944) is a retired East German rower. Under her maiden name, she won a silver and a gold medal in the eight event at the European championships of 1967 and 1968, respectively. Under her married name, she won a gold in the eight event at the 1969 European Rowing Championships in Klagenfurt.

She teamed up with Renate Boesler in the double scull and in the East German national championships, they came second in 1967, they placed outside the first three in 1968, and they came second again in 1969.
