= Ngwane Hansel =

- Born: Ngwane Hansel Masango; June 6, 1988 (age 38); Mundemba, Cameroon
- Other names: Valdes, Le Beau, Hansel N
- Occupations: Comedian, digital media specialist, entertainer, writer, artist, critic, filmmaker, blogger
- Years active: 2007–present
- Website: www.hanselmedia.com

Ngwane Hansel (popularly referred to as "Hansel") is an English-speaking Cameroonian comedian, entertainer, digital media specialist, artist, critic, filmmaker and writer. While in the entertainment business, he delved into professional online promotion through his company, Hansel Media and Kuzzah TV. As an entertainer, he hosted comedy shows like The Good, The Bad, The Funny and The Meet Hansel Show. He currently resides in Buea, after obtaining his master's degree in Digital Media and Communication. Presently, he's the host of the comedy TV show, The Hansel Show.

== Early life ==
Ngwane Hansel was born in Mundemba, Cameroon and is the first child of a family of five. His father is the Pan-Africanist scholar Mwalimu George Ngwane. At the age of 10, Hansel began doing impressions of his parents and other family members, much to the amusement of his friends. As a child, Hansel became interested in comedy while watching TV shows like "The Fresh Prince of Bell-Air", "Some Mothers do Have 'em" and "The Cosby Show". In 2011, Hansel graduated from the University of Buea, Cameroon with a bachelor's degree in Political Science and Public Administration. After several ventures, he decided to settle for online promotion by creating his online promotion company, Hansel Media.

== Career ==
As an entertainer, Hansel has been performing stand-up comedy in since he was 17. His first time on stage was at his high school graduation ceremony where he performed impressions of his teachers for his fellow students. While in university, he launched a standup comedy show. Later that year, a local TV Station was opened in Buea and he became the host of his own TV comedy show, "The Meet Hansel Show". The next year, he organized his first full-length standup comedy show "It's About Time".

After a few years, Hansel then left the TV Network and together with two other friends, created Zumhoo Studio Works, an audio/visual production company. There, he began his own comedy news show, The Good, The Bad, The Funny, which was a spoof on current events mostly in the Cameroon entertainment industry. He also created a slogan for his posts on Facebook, "Hanselize".

In August 2014, Zumhoo Studio Works released their first short movie, "Damaru". It was the first time Hansel played a major acting role in a film, which he did alongside Cameroonian actress Christa Eka. Hansel was also executive producer and screenwriter in the movie which was shot in Tole, Cameroon . "Damaru" talks on the issue of the plight of the handicapped in the society and has screened at national and international festivals. In late 2014, he then left Zumhoo Studio Works, citing ideological disparity as the main reason. He, with two other friends, created Makhan Productions, where he launched the "Kamer Kings of Comedy" show on 11 December 2014.

Hansel also proved to be a multidimensional entertainer when in October 2014, he released his first official single, "C.H.E.C.K" with fellow rapper Mic Monsta. He plans on releasing an album on mid 2015 to coincide with his next one-man comedy standup performance.

With the release of Damaru to festivals, Hansel suffered a major disappointment with his colleague which ended up in a lawsuit in which Hansel emerged victorious. With the proceeds, he decided to create his online promotion company, Hansel Media. With this company, he has worked to expand online promotion services for individuals, companies and artists. He launched the Hansel Media "Online Media Participation for Change" award in May 2015 as a major project for his company.

== The Hansel Show ==
Hansel currently hosts his own comedy TV show, "The Hansel Show" which is in its second season. The show is based on a news report format. In the show, Ngwane Hansel satirizes popular events and trends in a hilarious manner. The Hansel Show was indefinitely suspended on the 22nd of September 2017. In Ngwane Hansel's words, "Sometimes jokes aren't enough." Since then, fans have been clamoring for the return of The Hansel Show. Of recent, the edgy comedian recently teased fans in one of his Facebook posts, asking if they would pay to watch The Hansel Show online. As expected, many said they would.

== Controversy ==
Hansel has been known to be fearless in his comments, and has been involved in altercations with other Cameroonian entertainers, notably Stanley Enow and Jovi. His Facebook comments are said to be very funny albeit edgy, as he pokes the Achilles Heels of some famous personalities. Also, his popular blog contains sensitive yet educational information on the state and progress of the Cameroon entertainment industry. Hansel has stated that his comments and writing are intended in good faith.

== Personal life ==
Hansel is also a digital media specialist. He creates apps, has an online promotion website and has an online radio. He loves soccer and is an avid supporter of FC Barcelona. He played as goalkeeper in his school days which gained him the nickname "Valdes" (former FC Barcelona keeper).

== Filmography ==
List of Television and film performances
Year	Title	Role	Notes
2011	The Meet Hansel Show	Himself	Creator, Writer, Presenter
2012	It's About Time standup comedy special	Himself	Writer, executive producer
2013	The Good, The Bad, The Funny	Himself	Creator, Writer, Presenter
2014	Damaru	Mr. Patrick	Writer, executive producer
2016	The Hansel Show	Himself	Creator, Writer, Executive Producer
2017	The Hansel Show	Himself	Creator, Writer, Executive Producer

== Discography ==
- C.H.E.C.K (Non-famous) [2014]
