= Martina Boesler =

German rower

Personal information
- Born: 18 June 1957 (age 69) Berlin
- Height: 175 cm (5 ft 9 in)
- Weight: 70 kg (154 lb)

Sport
- Sport: Rowing
Medal record
Women's rowing
Representing East Germany
Olympic Games
Gold medal – first place	1980 Moscow	Eight
World Rowing Championships
Silver medal – second place	1979 Bled	W8+

Martina Boesler (later Kirchner and Wieduwilt, born 18 June 1957 in Berlin) is a German rower. She is the sister of Petra Boesler, who is also an Olympic rower. Their aunt, Renate Boesler, won several medals at European Rowing Championships.
