= Zbinden =

Zbinden is a surname. Notable people with the surname include:

- Carlos Zbinden (born 1976), Chilean hurdler
- Fritz Zbinden (1922–1983), Swiss cyclist
- Pascal Zbinden (born 1974), Swiss footballer
