= Rita Bludau =

German rower (born 1942)

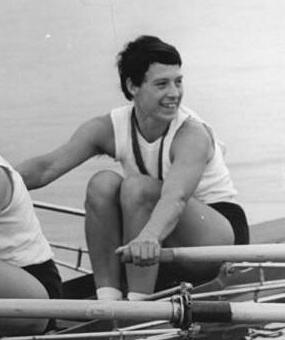
- Rita Schmidt in 1970

Sport
- Sport: Rowing
- Club: Luftfahrt Berlin
Medal record
Women's rowing
Representing East Germany
World Rowing Championships
Bronze medal – third place	1974 Lucerne	Double sculls
European Rowing Championships
Gold medal – first place	1968 East Berlin	Double sculls
Gold medal – first place	1969 Klagenfurt	Double sculls
Gold medal – first place	1970 Tata	Double sculls
Silver medal – second place	1971 Copenhagen	Double sculls

Rita Bludau (née Schmidt and then Schmidt-Köppen; born 27 January 1942) is a retired German rower and successful rowing coach.

As Rita Schmidt, she who won three gold and one silver medals in the double scull at the European championships between 1968 and 1971, together with Gisela Jäger. She also won a bronze medal in this event at the 1974 World Championships, together with Gisela Medefindt.

As Rita Bludau, she was one of the most successful rowing coaches in East Germany. Working at SC Berlin, she coached Jana Sorgers, Jutta Behrendt and Sybille Schmidt to Olympic gold or world championship titles.
