= Truus Bauer =

Dutch rower (1945–1989)

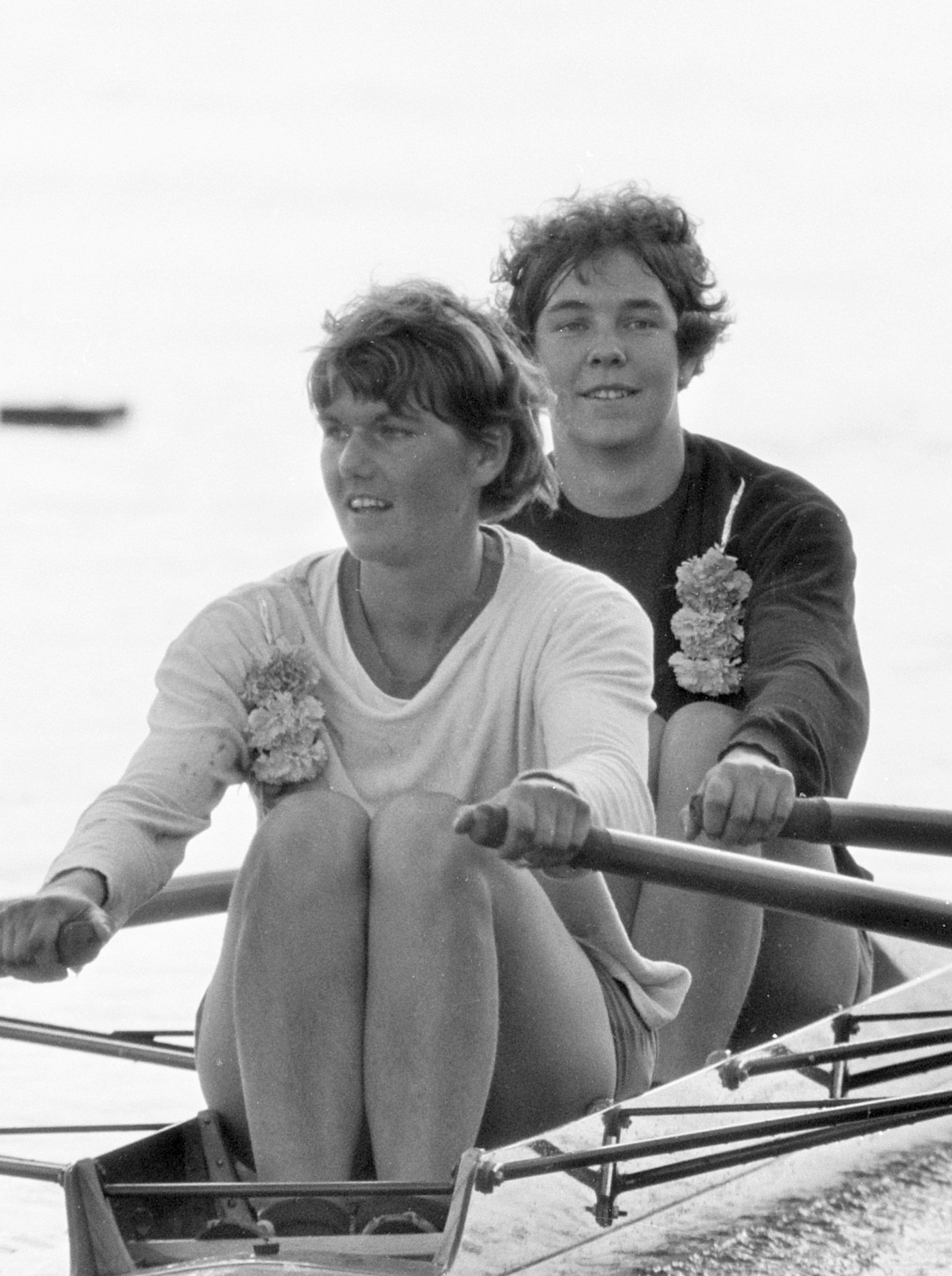
- Truus Bauer and Toos van den Ende in 1968

Personal information
- Born: 20 April 1945 Voorburg
- Died: 2 November 1989 (aged 44) Woerden, the Netherlands

Sport
- Sport: Rowing
Medal record
Representing the Netherlands
European Rowing Championships
| Silver medal – second place | 1968 East Berlin | Double sculls |
| Silver medal – second place | 1972 Brandenburg | Double sculls |

Truus Bauer (20 April 1945 – 2 November 1989) was a Dutch rower. Together with Toos van den Ende she won two European silver medals in the double sculls.
