= Anita Kuhlke =

East German rower

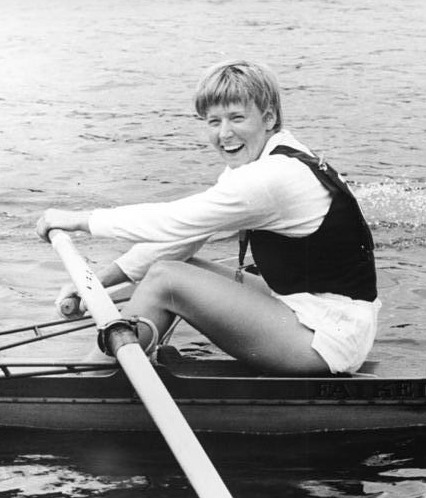
- Kuhlke in 1971

Personal information
- Born: 22 December 1947 (age 78) Berlin, Germany

Sport
- Sport: Rowing
- Club: Motor Wildau
Medal record
Representing East Germany
European Championships
Bronze medal – third place	1966 Amsterdam	Single sculls
Gold medal – first place	1967 Vichy	Single sculls
Gold medal – first place	1968 East Berlin	Single sculls
Silver medal – second place	1969 Klagenfurt	Single sculls
Gold medal – first place	1970 Tata	Single sculls
Gold medal – first place	1971 Copenhagen	Single sculls
Bronze medal – third place	1972 Brandenburg	Single sculls

Anita Kuhlke (later Sach, born 22 December 1947) is a retired East German rower. Between 1966 and 1972 she won all national titles and seven European medals in the single sculls, including four gold medals.

Kuhlke is a physician. She was married to Pavel Šach, a TV technician, and they have three children.
