= Aleksandra Bocharova =

Russian rower

Personal information
- Born: 6 May 1943 (age 83) Moscow, Russia

Sport
- Sport: Rowing
- Club: Dynamo
Medal record
Women's rowing
Representing the Soviet Union
European Rowing Championships
Gold medal – first place	1967 Vichy	Quad sculls
Gold medal – first place	1969 Klagenfurt	Quad sculls
Silver medal – second place	1966 Amsterdam	Quad sculls
Silver medal – second place	1970 Tata	Quad sculls
Silver medal – second place	1971 Copenhagen	Quad sculls
Bronze medal – third place	1968 East Berlin	Quad sculls

Aleksandra Nikolaevna Bocharova (Russian: Александра Николаевна Бочарова, born 6 May 1943) is a retired Russian rower who won six medals in quad sculls at the European championships of 1966–1971.
