= Ioana Tudoran =

Romanian rower

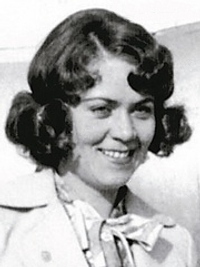

Personal information
- Born: 3 August 1948 (age 77) Otopeni, Romania
- Height: 175 cm (5 ft 9 in)
- Weight: 74 kg (163 lb)

Sport
- Sport: Rowing
- Club: Dinamo Bucharest
Medal record
Representing Romania
Olympic Games
Bronze medal – third place	1976 Montreal	Quadruple sculls
World Rowing Championships
Silver medal – second place	1974 Lucerne	Quadruple sculls
European Rowing Championships
Gold medal – first place	1968 East Berlin	Quadruple sculls
Silver medal – second place	1969 Klagenfurt	Quadruple sculls
Gold medal – first place	1970 Tata	Quadruple sculls
Gold medal – first place	1971 Copenhagen	Quadruple sculls

Ioana Tudoran (born 3 August 1948) is a retired Romanian rower who mostly competed in the quadruple sculls. In this event she won an Olympic bronze medal in 1976, a world championships silver medal in 1974 and European titles in 1968, 1970 and 1971.
