= Gisela Jäger =

East German rower

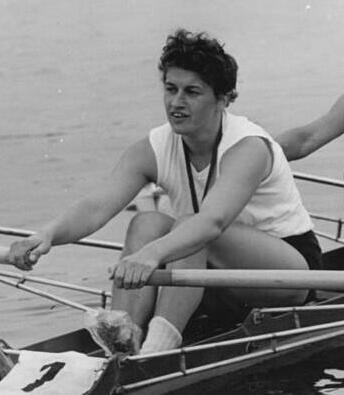
- Jäger in 1970

Sport
- Sport: Rowing
- Club: SC Einheit Berlin, TSC Oberschöneweide, Motor Baumschulenweg
Medal record
Representing East Germany
European Rowing Championships
Gold medal – first place	1968 Berlin	Double sculls
Gold medal – first place	1969 Klagenfurt	Double sculls
Gold medal – first place	1970 Tata	Double sculls
Silver medal – second place	1971 Copenhagen	Double sculls

Gisela Jäger was a German rower who won three gold and one silver medals in the double sculls at the European championships of 1968–1971, together with Rita Schmidt. Nationally, she won all single scull titles between 1957 and 1965, as well as double sculls in 1968–1971. She later married the rower Achim Hill.
