= Ingelore Kremtz-Bahls =

German rower

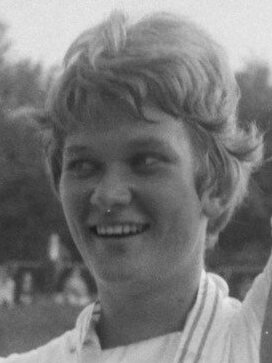
- Ingelore Kremtz-Bahls in 1966

Personal information
- Born: 18 June 1943 (age 83) Stargard, Germany
- Spouse: Peter Kremtz

Sport
- Sport: Rowing
- Club: SC Dynamo Berlin
Medal record
Women's rowing
Representing East Germany
European Rowing Championships
Gold medal – first place	1966 Amsterdam	Quadruple sculls
Silver medal – second place	1968 East Berlin	Quadruple sculls
Bronze medal – third place	1969 Klagenfurt	Quadruple sculls

Ingelore Kremtz (née Bahls; born 18 June 1943) is a retired German rower who won a gold, a silver and a bronze medal in the quadruple sculls at the European championships of 1966, 1968 and 1969, respectively. She works as a physiotherapist in Berlin. She was married to the rower Peter Kremtz.
