= Karin Luck =

Karin Luck may refer to:

- Karin Luck (rower)
- Karin Luck (politician)
