= Nina Bystrova =

Soviet rower

Personal information
- Full name: Nina Aleksandrovna Bystrova
- Born: 31 March 1944 Kuraginsky District, Krasnoyarsk Krai, Russian SFSR, Soviet Union
- Died: 5 April 2011 (aged 67) Veliky Novgorod, Russia

Sport
- Sport: Rowing
- Club: Spartak Novgorod
- Coached by: Yevgeny Morozov
Medal record
Women's rowing
Representing the Soviet Union
World Rowing Championships
Silver medal – second place	1974 Lucerne	Eight
European Rowing Championships
Gold medal – first place	1968 East Berlin	Coxed four
Gold medal – first place	1969 Klagenfurt	Coxed four
Gold medal – first place	1970 Tata	Coxed four
Gold medal – first place	1971 Copenhagen	Eight
Gold medal – first place	1972 Brandenburg	Coxed four
Gold medal – first place	1973 Moscow	Eight
Silver medal – second place	1967 Vichy	Coxed four

Nina Aleksandrovna Bystrova (Russian: Нина Александровна Быстрова; 31 March 1944 – 5 April 2011) was a Soviet rower who won six European titles between 1967 and 1973, as well as a silver medal at the 1974 World Championships.
