= Christa Ruppert =

German-Portuguese violinist (1935–2010)

Christa Ruppert Leiria (2 April 1935 – 6 May 2010) was a German-Portuguese violinist.

The daughter of painter Carlo Ruppert and Hermine Ruppert, eldest of three children, Christa Ruppert was born in 1935 in Frankfurt. She had her first violin lessons with her aunt Marliese Ruppert, a pupil of Carl Flesch, when she was 4 years old. She had her school education during and after the World War II, partly in schools which were destroyed by bombs.

== Education ==
From 1948 to 1952 she had private lessons with Senta Bergmann and then, till 1955 she was a pupil of the master class of Heinz Stanske in Heidelberg. In 1956 she attended the violin class of Professor Ricardo Odnoposoff at the international summer academy of the Mozarteum in Salzburg obtaining a first prize and then followed studies with this teacher at the Music Academy in Vienna till 1958. Starting in 1958 and well into Ruppert's career, she regularly had private lessons with Maxim Jacobsen in Frankfurt, London and Lisbon. Maxim Jacobsen developed, among a wealth of innovative study material - from which the best known are his paraphrases of the studies by Rodolphe Kreuzer- a particular method of violin gymnastics and his book published by Bosworth in London displays Ruppert exemplifying the exercises. In 1962 Ruppert studied privately for some months with Oskar Back in Amsterdam. From 1963 till a few weeks preceding his death in 1969 she studied musical interpretation with Theodor W. Adorno, with particular focus on 12-tone works by Arnold Schoenberg, Anton Webern and Alban Berg. Theodor W. Adorno praised enormously her very exceptional talent, artistic maturity, interpretative energy and musical posture both for new music and in the traditional repertoire.

== Career ==
Ruppert's soloist's career, which started with a debut 1965 in Florence with Alban Berg´s concerto, can be roughly divided in the time before and after 1969, when she moved to Portugal to become leader of the National Radio Orchestra (Emissora Nacional) in Lisbon. Before 1969 she held, with enthusiastic applause and critics, concerts as a soloist with orchestra in several European cities, among which Florence, Olomouc, Bucharest, Vienna, Cairo, Munich, Frankfurt and Berlin, among others, with the concerts of Felix Mendelssohn, Brahms, Beethoven, Max Bruch and, her speciality, Alban Berg. Her performance in Vienna, with the Austrian Radio Orchestra under Hans Swarowsky was regarded by the composer's widow as ideal. She played with Rostropovich in Czechoslovakia and replaced Leonid Kogan in Ohrid. 1966-67 she held the position of concertmaster of the Symphony Orchestra of the Lake of Constance and became in 1967 the first female violinist at the Munich Philharmonic, under Rudolf Kempe. An important impulse to her career was given by Mr. Passavant, Nassau, Germany who sponsored some concerts and who offered her a concert violin.

In September 1968 she and her father had a severe car crash near Erbach. Among her injuries she lost an eye. In the other car there was a casualty and a severely handicapped person. This point marks the interruption of Ruppert's solo career. In the autumn of 1969 she said farewell to Germany and went to Portugal.

In Lisbon she became the first concertmaster of the National Radio Orchestra (Emissora Nacional). She married Jorge Camara Leiria and acquired the name of Christa Ruppert Leiria and Portuguese nationality. In Portugal, she regularly played as a soloist with orchestra, several major solo works including Max Bruch, Brahms, Mendelssohn, Alexander Glazunov, Dvořák, Bach, Mozart, and Alban Berg, till the orchestra was dissolved in 1989, to be reorganised and reopen under a new name. Despite a unanimous recommendation by a jury before which Ruppert played for a new position, she never got an invitation for the orchestra. She was offered a position as a teacher in the Lisbon Music Conservatory, which she held until her retirement in 2005. She died of prolonged cancer on 10 May 2010 in her house in Alcabideche, near Cascais, having outlived her husband for over 10 years.

== Pedagogic activity ==
Ruppert held pedagogic activity throughout her life. most successful pedagogic activity would appear to have been as a teacher of master classes, having been active in several places in Germany including Frankfurt and the Beda Institute in Bitburg with the set-up of a children's string orchestra, Portugal, Cairo and, from 1983 till shortly before her death, in Brazil, mainly in Olinda (near Recife) and Brasília. She worked there with Maestro Geraldo Menucci in the "Fundação Centro de Criatividade Musical de Olinda" – FCCMO, giving lessons to poor children and later setting up a juvenile orchestra and giving impulses to the project "Making music barefeet". Ruppert also kept going herself to master classes well into her later life and took private lessons with Tibor Varga, who she admired enormously, until his death. Under his orientation she obtained a master's degree at the music school in Sion in 1989.

== Recordings ==
Mendelssohn Vln Con in e minor, recorded for Rondo-lette label in the early 60s (conductor: Otto Schmidt). Two CDs recorded in the three last years of her life, one with sonatas by Debussy, Mozart, César Franck and Arvo Pärt, the other with the Brahms sonatas. These were done when Ruppert was over 70, displaying a rare courage. Ruppert made many recordings throughout her life including works by Anton Webern, Arnold Schönberg, Eduard Steuermann, Grażyna Bacewicz, Dmitri Shostakovich, Zbinden and Béla Bartók for the radios of Zurich, Vienna, Cologne, Baden-Baden, Milan, Madrid and Lisbon, including a recording of Alban Berg's concerto for Vienna's radio. These are not commercially available.

== Performances ==
- Concert programme of Wigmore Hall 7 June 1961
- Concert programme Concertgebouw 16 April (1961?)
- Critic "Algemeen Handelsblad" 2 November 1960
- Critic "Süddeutsche Zeitung" 11 February 1966
- Critic "Münchner Abendblatt" 16 February 1966
- Critic "Giornale L'Italia" 5 March 1966
- Critic "Berliner Presse" 26 March 1967
- Concert programme of Wigmore Hall, 8 April 1967
- Concert programme of Teatro Nacional de Brasília 24 January 1985.
- Critic "Diário de Pernambuco" 27 November 1986
