= Stefan Voncken =

German rowing cox

Sport
- Sport: Rowing
- Club: Ruderverein Neptun (Konstanz)
Medal record
Men's rowing
Representing West Germany
World Rowing Championships
Gold medal – first place	1970 St. Catharines	Coxed four
European Rowing Championships
Gold medal – first place	1969 Klagenfurt	Coxed four

Stefan Voncken is a German coxswain.

Voncken is a member of the Ruderverein (rowing club) Neptun in Konstanz. He won gold with the coxed four at the 1969 European Rowing Championships in Klagenfurt. He won a gold medal at the 1970 World Rowing Championships in St. Catharines with the men's coxed four. After his competitive rowing career, he worked at his rowing club as a coach.
