= Nina Abramova =

Russian rower (born 1949)

Personal information
- Full name: Nina Valentinova Abramova
- Born: 2 February 1949 (age 77) Petrovsk, Saratov Oblast, Russia

Sport
- Sport: Rowing
Medal record
Women's rowing
Representing the Soviet Union
World Rowing Championships
| Silver medal – second place | 1974 Lucerne | Eight |
| Silver medal – second place | 1977 Amsterdam | Coxed four |
European Rowing Championships
| Gold medal – first place | 1968 East Berlin | Coxed four |
| Gold medal – first place | 1969 Klagenfurt | Coxed four |
| Gold medal – first place | 1970 Tata | Coxed four |
| Gold medal – first place | 1971 Copenhagen | Eight |
| Gold medal – first place | 1972 Brandenburg | Coxed four |
| Gold medal – first place | 1973 Moscow | Eight |

Nina Valentinova Abramova (later Zvereva, Russian: Нина Валентиновна Абрамова (Зверева), born 2 February 1949) is a retired Russian rower who won six European titles and two silver medals at the world championships between 1968 and 1977.
