= Toos van der Ende =

Dutch rower

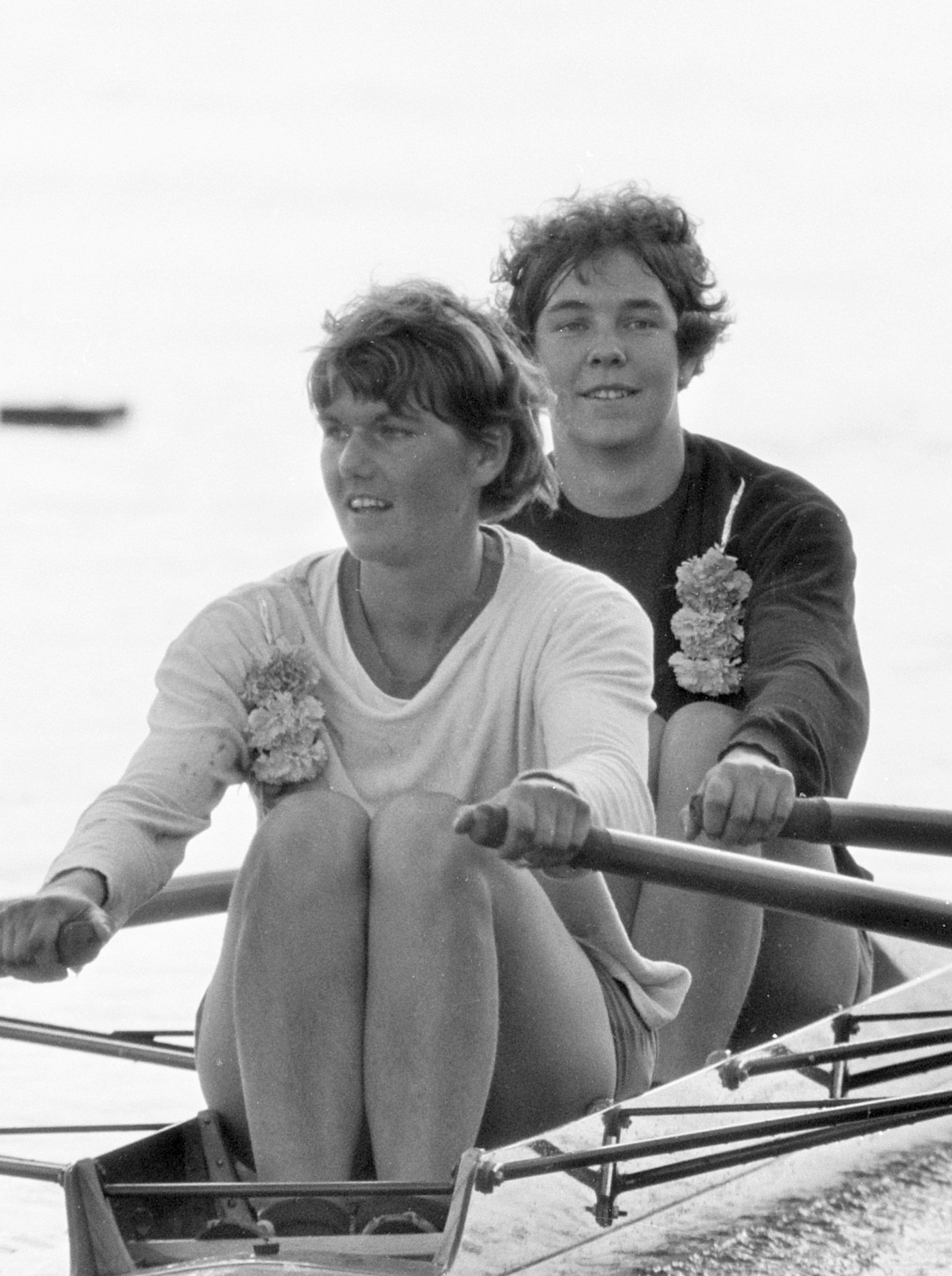
- Truus Bauer and Toos van der Ende (right) in 1968

Personal information
- Born: 1945/46

Sport
- Sport: Rowing
Medal record
Representing the Netherlands
European Rowing Championships
Silver medal – second place	1968 East Berlin	Double sculls
Silver medal – second place	1972 Brandenburg	Double sculls

Catharina "Toos" van der Ende (later van Akkeren, born 1945/46) is a retired Dutch rower. Together with Truus Bauer she won two European silver medals in the double sculls.
