= 1968 European Rowing Championships =

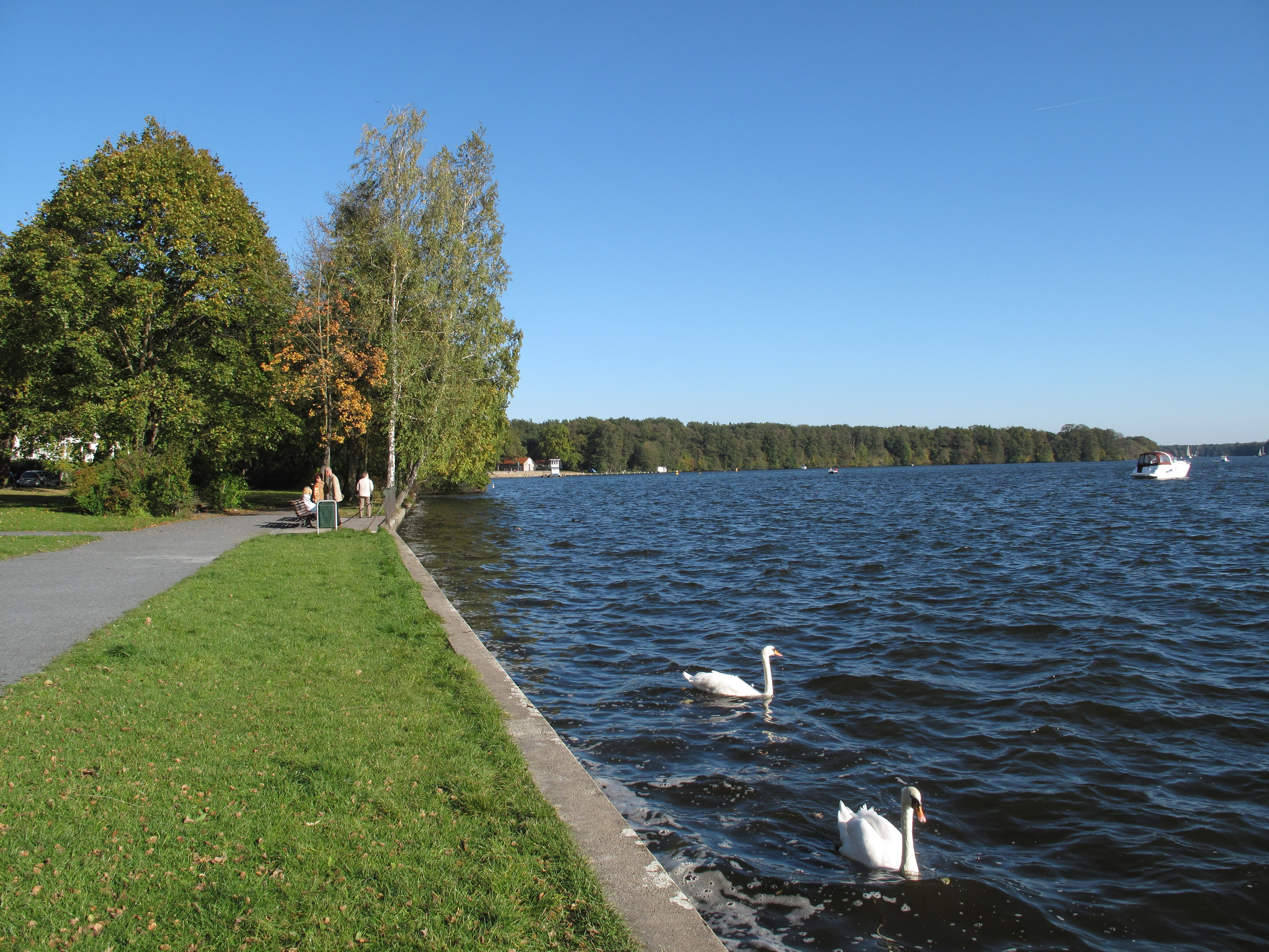
- View of Langer See
- Venue: Grünau Regatta Course on the Langer See
- Location: Grünau, East Berlin, East Germany
- Dates: 16–18 August 1968

The 1968 European Rowing Championships were rowing championships held on the Grünau Regatta Course in the East Berlin suburb of Grünau. This edition of the European Rowing Championships was for women only and was held from 16 to 18 August. Twelve or fifteen countries (sources vary) contested five boat classes (W1x, W2x, W4x+, W4+, W8+), and 39 teams competed. Despite the European label of the event, it was open to any country and was regarded as unofficial world championships, but all contesting countries in 1968 were from Europe. The men would meet in Mexico City in mid-October at the 1968 Summer Olympics.

== Background ==
The International Rowing Federation (FISA) had trouble finding a willing host for the 1968 Championships. The matter had been discussed at the FISA congress held in conjunction with the 1967 European Rowing Championships in Vichy. At that same meeting, East Germany had its membership status elevated from associate to ordinary. Delighted with the new status, the president of the East German rowing association, Alfred Bruno Neumann, volunteered to check whether his country could host the championships, and the eventual answer was positive. The chosen venue was the Grünau Regatta Course, which had previously been used for the 1936 Summer Olympics, and later for the 1962 European Rowing Championships. Grünau was confirmed by FISA in early March 1968.

In early June, the Deutsche Post of the GDR issued three stamps depicting notable sporting events in East Germany that year. One of the designs by graphic designer Joachim Rieß shows a single sculling woman with reference to the upcoming European Championships.

The 15 countries reported to compete (another source mentions 12 countries only, but does not list them) were the Soviet Union, Romania, Bulgaria, Hungary, Czechoslovakia, Poland, the Netherlands, Sweden, Belgium, England, Austria, Denmark, France, West Germany, and the host country East Germany. Of those, only the Soviet Union, Romania, and East Germany had boats in all five classes.

== Medal summary – women's events ==
The regatta started with an opening event on the evening of 15 August. The heats were rowed the next day. Any semi-finals were held on 17 August, and the finals were held on Sunday, 18 August. Gisela Jäger and Rita Schmidt surprisingly won gold in the double sculls after just four weeks of training together. The long-standing double sculling partners Monika Sommer and Ursula Pankraths were to represent East Germany, but Sommer fell ill and new sculling teams were formed, of which Jäger and Schmidt were chosen for the European Championships. In the eight event, only five boats were listed, hence the final was the first competition for these boats. East Germany surprisingly won over the favourite team from Romania. Initially, the Soviet Union was awarded second place, but was disqualified later due to having caused two false starts. Czechoslovakia came fourth.

Event	Gold		Silver		Bronze	
Event	Country & rowers	Time	Country & rowers	Time	Country & rowers	Time
W1x	East Germany; Anita Kuhlke	4:00.79	France; Renée Camu	4:01.46	Austria; Renate Sika	4:04.85
W2x	East Germany; Gisela Jäger; Rita Schmidt	3:47.13	Netherlands; Truus Bauer; Toos van der Ende	3:47.62	Soviet Union; Yevgenia Vlassova; Tatyana Markvo	3:50.80
W4+	Soviet Union; Nina Bystrova; Nina Burakova; Nina Abramova; Nadezhda Nikolaevna; Olga Blagovensenskaya (cox)	3:39.85	Romania; Doina Balasa; Luminita Olteanu; Viorica Lincaru; Stana Tudor; Stefania Borisov (cox)	3:41.29	East Germany; Marita Berndt; Hanna Mitter; Barbara Behrend; Christine Turba; Ulrike Skrbek (cox)	3:42.03
W4x+	Romania; Ioana Tudoran; Mitana Botez; Maria Hublea; Ileana Nemeth; Stefania Borisov (cox)	3:31.07	East Germany; Dagmar Holst; Ingelore Kremtz-Bahls; Inge Schneider-Gabriel; Inge Bartlog; Karin Bauschke (cox)	3:33.30	Soviet Union; Sofia Grucova; Aleksandra Bocharova; Natalya Turkina; Antonina Mariskina; Tamara Grony (cox)	3:33.42
W8+	East Germany; Marlis Wegener; Renate Schlenzig; Renate Seyfarth; Gabriele Kelm; Ursula Pankraths; Rosemarie Schmidtke; Renate Boesler; Renate Weber; Gudrun Apelt (cox)	3:15.62	Romania; Doina Balasa; Luminita Olteanu; Viorica Lincaru; Stana Tudor; Marioara Singiorzan; Marina Mocioaca; Viorica Cretu; Doina Bardas; Stefania Borisov (cox)	3:21.06	Netherlands; J. Kaayk; S. M. ten Kade; M. M. van IJsel Smits; E. M. C. Gerits; M. M. M. Smits; T. G. A. van Horne; A. J. van den Berg; E. G. van Eekelen; Marijke Kraayenhof (cox)	3:23.95
