= 1969 European Rowing Championships =

International rowing event

- Location: Klagenfurt, Austria
- Dates: 5–7 September 1969 (women) ?–14 September 1969 (men)

The 1969 European Rowing Championships were rowing championships held on the Wörthersee in the Austrian city of Klagenfurt. This edition of the European Rowing Championships was held from 5 to 7 September for women, and a few days later for men. Women entered in five boat classes (W1x, W2x, W4x+, W4+, W8+), and 15 countries—including the United States—sent 47 boats. Men competed in all seven Olympic boat classes (M1x, M2x, M2-, M2+, M4-, M4+, M8+). An innovation was that petite finals were held to determine places 7 to 12.

== Background ==
At its congress held in conjunction with the 1967 European Rowing Championships in Vichy, the International Rowing Federation (FISA) had decided that the 1969 Championships would be held on the Lake of Banyoles in Spain. Circumstances changed and the event moved to Austria.

== Medal summary – women's events ==
Event	Gold		Silver		Bronze	
Event	Country & rowers	Time	Country & rowers	Time	Country & rowers	Time
W1x	Soviet Union; Genovaitė Ramoškienė	3:53.01	East Germany; Anita Kuhlke	3:56.16	Austria; Renate Sika	3:56.27
W2x	East Germany; Gisela Jäger; Rita Schmidt	3:35.87	Czechoslovakia; Alena Kvasilová; Jana Fisakova	3:37.81	Soviet Union; Yevgenia Vlassova; Tatyana Markvo	3:39.05
W4+	Soviet Union; Nina Bystrova; Nina Burakova; Nina Abramova; Nadezhda Nikolaevna; Olga Blagovensenskaya (cox)	3:33.25	East Germany; Rosel Nitsche; Sabine Dähne; Martina Wunderlich; Renate Weber; Ulrike Skrbek (cox)	3:37.68	West Germany; Ilse Lebert; Bärbel Seddig; Astrid Kallmayr; Heike Witt; Erika Rehberg (cox)	3:39.46
W4x+	Soviet Union; Sofia Grucova; Tatyana Gomolko; Aleksandra Bocharova; Antonina Mariskina; Tamara Grony (cox)	3:24.22	Romania; Ioana Tudoran; Mitana Botez; Doina Bardas; Ileana Nemeth; Stefania Borisov (cox)	3:24.62	East Germany; Dagmar Seipt; Inge Schneider; Ingelore Kremtz; Monika Riegel; Karin Bauschke (cox)	3:25.64
W8+	East Germany; Marita Berndt; Hanna Mitter; Ursula Pankraths; Gabriele Kelm; Renate Schlenzig; Rosemarie Lorenz; Renate Boesler; Barbara Behrend; Gudrun Apelt (cox)	3:11.92	Soviet Union; Valentina Baklickaya; Lyudmila Resetnjak; Lyubov Antonova; Galina Litowec; Tamara Danjilina; Klawdija Marudo; Valentina Barinova; Natalia Sidovinova; Alla Sisheva (cox)	3:13.12	Romania; Ecaterina Trancioveanu; Stana Tudor; Elena Necula; Elena Dragomir; Viorica Cretu; Marioara Singiorzan; Viorica Lincaru; Doina Balasa; Elena Giurcă (cox)	3:14.83

== Medal summary – men's events ==
Event	Gold		Silver		Bronze	
Event	Country & rowers	Time	Country & rowers	Time	Country & rowers	Time
M1x	Argentina; Alberto Demiddi	7:45.79	East Germany; Joachim Böhmer	7:49/39	West Germany; Jochen Meißner	7:53.47
M2x	United States; John van Blom; Thomas McKibbon	7:07.82	Austria; Sepp Puchinger; Manfred Krausbar	7:12.03	East Germany; Jochen Brückhändler; Manfred Haake	7:13.56
M2-	United States; Larry Hough; Tony Johnson	7:11.73	East Germany; Frank Forberger; Dieter Grahn	7:12.07	Denmark; Peter Christiansen; Ib Larsen	7:14.24
M2+	Czechoslovakia; Oldřich Svojanovský; Pavel Svojanovský; Vladimír Petříček (cox)	7:44.10	Italy; Primo Baran; Angelo Rossetto; Giorgio Sajeva (cox)	7:45.26	Romania; Gheorghe Moldoveanu; Petre Ceapura; Gheorghe Gheorghia (cox)	7:46.57
M4-	Soviet Union; Victor Alesin; Boris Wesselow; Mikhail Chekin; Anatoli Fedorov	6:47.90	Hungary; Antal Melis; György Sarlós; József Csermely; Zoltán Melis	6:48.95	East Germany; Werner Klatt; Peter Gorny; Karl-Heinz Prudöhl; Bernd Meerbach	6:51.19
M4+	West Germany; Peter Berger; Hans-Johann Färber; Gerhard Auer; Alois Bierl; Stefan Voncken (cox)	6:43.17	East Germany; Peter Hein; Jörg Lucke; Heinz-Jürgen Bothe; Klaus-Dieter Bähr; Hartmut Wenzel (cox)	6:44.27	Switzerland; Hugo Waser; Franz Rentsch; Peter Bolliger; Adolf Waser; Martin Bächler (cox)	6:50.83
M8+	East Germany; Dieter Schubert; Manfred Wiesner; Horst Walter; Klaus Liefke; Rolf Zimmermann; Volker Thurow; Wolfgang Wüst; Klaus Bährwald; Wolfgang Wilde (cox)	6:07.53	Soviet Union; Zigmas Jukna; Vladimir Jesinov; Volodymyr Sterlik; Juozas Jagelavičius; Ludas Subacius; Alexander Hamin; Anatoly Tkachuk; Vitaly Kurdchenko; Igor Rudakov (cox)	6:09.63	West Germany; Günther Karl; Achim Wienstroer; Thomas Hitzbleck; Ingo Scholz; Manfred Weinreich; Rolf Hartung; Franz Held; Bernd Gördes; Lutz Benter (cox)	6:09.67
