= Christa Ehrmann-Hämmerle =

Austrian historian (born 1957)

Christa Ehrmann-Hämmerle (born Schaffhausen, 31 October 1957 as Christa Hämmerle) is a Swiss-born Austrian historian. She is Associate Professor of Modern History at the University of Vienna. Her work focuses on military history, particularly World War 1, as well as women and gender history of the 19th and 20th centuries. Since 2011, she has been a spokeswoman for the Military History Working Group. She is co-founder and co-editor of the scientific journal L'Homme - Europäische Zeitschrift für Feministische Geschichtswissenschaft.

== Awards and honours ==
She was awarded the Käthe Leichter Prize for Women's Research, Gender Studies and Gender Equality in 1999.

== Selected works ==
- Christa Hämmerle, Heimat/Front. Geschlechtergeschichte/n des Ersten Weltkriegs in Österreich-Ungarn (Wien/Köln/Weimar: Böhlau, 2014).
- Christa Hämmerle, Birgitta Bader-Zaar and Oswald Überegger (eds.) Gender and the First World War (Basingstoke: Palgrave Macmillan 2014) Author of the chapter: "'Mentally broken, physically a wreck ...': Violence in War Accounts of Nurses in Austro-Hungarian Service", 89–107.
- Christa Hämmerle, "Between Instrumentalisation and Self-Governing: (Female) Ego-Documents in The European Age of Total War," in The Uses of First Person Writings. Africa, America, Asia, Europe/Les usages des écrits du for privé. Afrique, Amérique, Asie, Europe. Edited by/sous la direction de Francois-Joseph Ruggiu (Bruxelles: Lang, 2013), 263–284.
- Christa Hämmerle, "Trost und Erinnerung. Kontexte und Funktionen des Tagebuchschreibens von Therese Lindenberg (1938 bis 1946)", in Die Tagebücher der Therese Lindenberg 1938 bis 1946, Christa Hämmerle and Li Gerhalter, eds (Köln: Böhlau, 2010). 1–60.
- Christa Hämmerle, '"... dort wurden wir dressiert und sekiert und geschlagen ..." Vom Drill, dem Disziplinarstrafrecht und Soldatenmisshandlungen im Heer (1868 bis 1914)", in Glanz - Gewalt - Gehorsam. Militär und Gesellschaft in der Habsburgermonarchie (1800 bis 1918), Laurence Cole, Christa Hämmerle and Martin Scheutz, eds (Essen: Klartext Verlagsgesellschaft, 2011), 31–54.
