= Wilfried Bock =

East German biathlete

Medal record

Representing East Germany

Men's biathlon

World Championships
Gold medal – first place	1967 Altenberg	Relay

Wilfried Bock is a retired East German biathlete who won a gold medal at the first world championship. He was awarded the Saxony biathlete of the century. Later he opened a skiing school. He began his career at the SG Dynamo Zinnwald / Sportvereinigung (SV) Dynamo.
