= Pascal Zbinden =

Swiss footballer (born 1974)

Personal information
- Date of birth: 18 February 1974 (age 52)
- Place of birth: Switzerland
- Height: 1.92 m (6 ft 4 in)
- Position: Goalkeeper

Senior career*
Years	Team	Apps	(Gls)
2005–2008	Lausanne-Sport		
- * Club domestic league appearances and goals

Pascal Zbinden (born 18 February 1974) is a Swiss former professional footballer who played as a goalkeeper for Lausanne-Sport.
