= Christa Staak =

German rower

Medal record

Women's rowing

Representing East Germany

European Rowing Championships
Gold medal – first place	1970 Tata	Eights

Christa Staak is a German rower, who competed for the SC Dynamo Berlin / Sportvereinigung (SV) Dynamo. She won the medals at the international rowing competitions.
