= Bernd Wiesner =

Medal record

Representing East Germany

Men's Parachuting

World Championships
Bronze medal – third place	1974 Szolnok	Team Accuracy
Bronze medal – third place	1974 Szolnok	Team
Gold medal – first place	1978 Zagreb	Team Accuracy
Gold medal – first place	1978 Zagreb	Team Combinated
Silver medal – second place	1980 Kasanlyk, Bulgaria	Team Accuracy
Silver medal – second place	1980 Kasanlyk, Bulgaria	Team Combinated
Gold medal – first place	1982 Lucenec, Czechoslovakia	Single
Gold medal – first place	1982 Lucenec, Czechoslovakia	Combination
Gold medal – first place	1982 Lucenec, Czechoslovakia	Team Combinated
Gold medal – first place	1982 Lucenec, Czechoslovakia	Complete
Bronze medal – third place	1984 Vichy	Team Combinated

Bernd Wiesner is a skydiver, who competed for the SC Dynamo Hoppegarten / Sportvereinigung (SV) Dynamo. He won several medals at the World Championships.
