= Rudi Hirsch =

German handballer (1931–2021)

Medal record

Men's handball

Representing East Germany

World Championships
Gold medal – first place	1959 Austria	Field Handball

Rudi Hirsch (20 November 1931 - 27 November 2021) was a German handballer, who competed for the SC Dynamo Berlin / Sportvereinigung (SV) Dynamo. He played at the world championships 1958 (3rd), 1959 (world champion), 1963 (world champion) and 1964.
