= Klaus-Dieter Matz =

Died 18.02.2005 East German handball player (born 1932)

Medal record

Men's handball

Representing East Germany

Indoor World Championships
Bronze medal – third place	1958 GDR	Team

Outdoor World Championships
Gold medal – first place	1959 Austria	Team
Gold medal – first place	1963 Switzerland	Team

Klaus-Dieter Matz (born 16 August 1932 in Rostock) is an East German handballer who competed for the SC Dynamo Berlin. He won two times the Outdoor World Championships (1959 and 1963) and a bronze medal at the 1958 Indoor World Championship.
