= Christa Fouché =

New Zealand social work academic

Christa B. Fouché
- Education: Rand Afrikaans University
- Scientific career
- Fields: Social work
- Workplaces: University of Auckland
- Thesis: 'n Opleidingsprogram vir voornemende maatskaplike werkers in hulpverlening aan persone met HIV-infeksie (1992)

Christa B. Fouché is a New Zealand social work academic. She is currently professor of social work at the University of Auckland. Her work has covered people living with medical conditions such as HIV/AIDS and Alzheimer's disease.

Fouché's PhD from the Rand Afrikaans University looked at training social workers to serve with black South Africans with HIV/AIDS.

== Selected works ==
- Strydom, H., C. B. Fouche, and C. S. L. Delport. "Research at grass roots: for the social sciences and human service professions." Pretoria: VanSchaik Publishers (2002).
- Fouché, C. B., and W. Schurink. "Qualitative research designs." Research at grass roots: For the social sciences and human service professions 3 (2005): 267–273.
