= Inge Bartlog =

German rower

Inge Roswita Heidemarie Giesemann geb. Bartlog
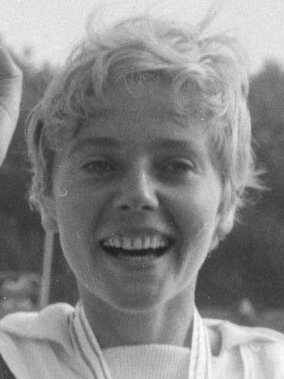
- Inge Bartlog at the 1966 European Championships

Personal information
- Born: 20 February 1944
- Died: 19 November 2024 (aged 80) Berlin

Sport
- Sport: Rowing
- Club: SC Dynamo Berlin
Medal record
Women's rowing
Representing East Germany
European Rowing Championships
Gold medal – first place	1966 Amsterdam	Quadruple sculls
Silver medal – second place	1968 East Berlin	Quadruple sculls

Inge Bartlog is a retired German rower who won a gold and a silver medal in the quadruple sculls at the European championships of 1966 and 1968, respectively.
