= Werner Senger =

German handballer

Medal record

Men's handball

Representing East Germany

World Championships
Gold medal – first place	1963 Suisse	Field Handball
Silver medal – second place	1970 France	Field Handball
Silver medal – second place	1967 Sweden	Indoor Handball

Werner Senger is a German handballer, who competed for the SC Dynamo Berlin / Sportvereinigung (SV) Dynamo. He won the silver medal at the world championships 1967.
