= Christa Neuper =

Austrian psychologist

Christa Neuper (born February 12, 1958, in Graz, Austria) is a psychologist who graduated from the University of Graz. Neuper was the first woman in the 426 years of history of the University of Graz to be its rector (2011–2019).

After her doctorate in 1984, Neuper worked on the research and teaching at the Institute of Psychology, from the University of Graz and the Institute of Biomedical Engineering, from the Graz University of Technology. In 2002 Christa Neuper completed her free docency at the University of Graz, where in 2005 she was named professor of applied psychology and human-machine interfaces. Neuper was named in various management positions at both universities, assuming the presidency of the Institute for Semantic Data Analysis at the Graz University of Technology, and the direction of the Institute of Psychology of the University of Graz. Christa Neuper is married and mother of two adult children.
