= Renate Schlenzig =

German rower (born 1944)

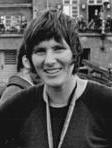
- Renate Schlenzig at the GDR rowing championships 1974

Personal information
- Nationality: East Germany
- Born: 1944 (age 81–82)

Sport
- Sport: Rowing

Renate Schlenzig (born 1944) is a competitive rower from East Germany. She won a medal in the 1974 World Rowing Championships and seven medals in the European Rowing Championships between 1967 and 1973.

== International medals ==
Year	Event	Place	Medal	Class
1974	World Rowing Championships	Lucerne (Switzerland)	Gold	Coxed fours
1967	European Rowing Championships	Vichy (France)	Gold	Coxed four
1968	European Rowing Championships	East Berlin (East Germany)	Gold	Eight
1969	European Rowing Championships	Klagenfurt am Wörthersee (Austria)	Gold	Eight
1970	European Rowing Championships	Tata (Hungary)	Gold	Eight
1971	European Rowing Championships	Copenhagen (Denmark)	Silver	Eight
1972	European Rowing Championships	Brandenburg (East Germany)	Silver	Eight
1973	European Rowing Championships	Moscow (USSR)	Silver	Eight
