= Klaus Petzold =

German handball player

Medal record

Men's handball

Representing East Germany

World Championships
Silver medal – second place	1970 France	Team
Gold medal – first place	1963 Suisse	Team

Klaus Petzold is a German handballer, who competed for the SC Dynamo Berlin / Sportvereinigung (SV) Dynamo. He won the silver medal at the world championships, 1966.
