= 1970 European Rowing Championships =

- Venue: Lake Öreg
- Location: Tata, Hungary
- Dates: 20–23 August 1970
- Nations: 17

The 1970 European Rowing Championships were rowing championships held on Lake Öreg in Tata, Hungary. There were five competitions for women only (W1x, W2x, W4x+, W4+, W8+); the events for men were contested two weeks later at the 1970 World Rowing Championships in St. Catharines, Canada, instead. As World Rowing Championships were still held at four-year intervals at the time, the European Rowing Championships were open to nations outside of Europe and had become to be regarded as quasi-world championships.

The championships were held from 20 to 23 August 1970 and that saw entries from 17 nations. The Soviet Union, the host Hungary, Poland, Czechoslovakia, Romania, the Netherlands and East Germany were the countries that contested all five boat classes. In total, 56 boats were nominated. The competition distance was 1000 metres.

== Medal summary – women's events ==
East Germany was the most successful country with three gold medals (single sculls, double sculls, and eight), with one gold to the Soviet Union (coxed four) and Romania (coxed quad scull) each.

Event	Gold		Silver		Bronze	
Event	Country & rowers	Time	Country & rowers	Time	Country & rowers	Time
W1x	East Germany; Anita Kuhlke	4:21.62	Netherlands; Ingrid Dusseldorp	4:24.80	Soviet Union; Genovaitė Šidagytė	4:26.68
W2x	East Germany; Gisela Jäger; Rita Schmidt	3:57.55	Soviet Union; Galina Suslina; Elena Kondrashina	4:00.00	Bulgaria; Miglena Totsewa; Werka Aleksiewa	4:01.00
W4+	Soviet Union; Nina Bystrova; Larissa Sotskova; Nina Abramova; Maria Kowaljova; Nina Frolova (cox)	3:57.03	East Germany; Gabriele Graffunder; Eva-Maria Walter; Jutta Michel; Gisela Kusch; Karin Bauschke (cox)	3:59.48	West Germany; Margret Dohrendorf; Barbara Kuhlmey-Becker; Doris Olak; Helga Flintsch; Birgit Kiesow (cox)	4:04.54
W4x+	Romania; Ioana Tudoran; Mitana Botez; Elisabeth Lazar; Ileana Nemeth; Stefania Borisov (cox)	3:46.16	Soviet Union; Sofia Grucova; Tatyana Gomolko; Aleksandra Bocharova; Antonina Mariskina; Tamara Grony (cox)	3:47.22	East Germany; Sabine Dähne; Monika Mittenzwei; Martina Wunderlich; Gunhild Blanke; Christine Karsch (cox)	3:52.73
W8+	East Germany; Marita Berndt; Renate Schlenzig; Rosel Nitsche; Gabriele Rotermund; Christa Staack; Ute Marten; Renate Boesler; Barbara Behrend; Gudrun Apelt (cox)	3:27.05	Soviet Union; Valentina Baklickaja; Lyudmila Resetnjak; Tamara Danjilina; Galina Litowec; Lyubov Antonova; Klavdija Marudo; Natalia Sidovinova; Valentina Barinova; Alla Sisheva (cox)	3:27.53	Romania; Doina Balasa; Marioara Singiorzan; Doina Bardas; Viorica Cretu; Teodora Untaru; Elena Neculau; Ecaterina Trancioveanu; Viorica Lincaru; Mariana Naidin (cox)	3:35.93

== Medals table ==
Rank	Nation	Gold	Silver	Bronze	Total
1	East Germany (GDR)	3	1	1	5
2	Soviet Union (URS)	1	3	1	5
3	Romania (ROM)	1	0	1	2
4	Bulgaria (BUL)	0	0	1	1
4	West Germany (FRG)	0	0	1	1
Totals (5 entries)		5	4	5	14
