= Nikolay Gomolko =

Russian rower

Personal information
- Born: 18 July 1938 (age 87) Pushkin, Leningrad, Russian SFSR, Soviet Union
- Height: 1.82 m (6 ft 0 in)
- Weight: 80 kg (176 lb)
- Spouse: Tatyana Gomolko

Sport
- Sport: Rowing

Nikolay Gomolko (Russian: Николай Гомолко, born 18 July 1938) is a retired Russian rower who competed in the eights event at the 1960 Summer Olympics for the Soviet Union. His wife Tatyana Gomolko also competed internationally in rowing.
