= Christa Castro =

Honduran politician

Christa Castro is a Honduran politician. She serves as Honduras's Minister of Communication and Government Strategy.
