= Frank Kegelbein =

German boxer

Medal record

Men's boxing

Representing East Germany

World Championships
Bronze medal – third place	1979 Köln	Lightweight

Frank Kegelbein is a German lightweight boxer who won the bronze medal of world championships in Rom, 1978. He competed for the SC Dynamo Berlin / Sportvereinigung (SV) Dynamo.
