= Dagmar Holst =

East German rower

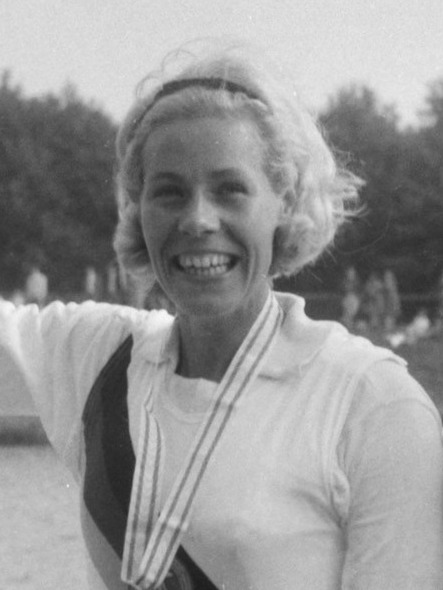
- Dagmar Holst at the 1966 European Championships

Personal information
- Born: 29 November 1942 (age 83)

Sport
- Sport: Rowing
- Club: SC Dynamo Berlin
Medal record
Representing East Germany
European Rowing Championships
Gold medal – first place	1966 Amsterdam	Quadruple sculls
Silver medal – second place	1968 East Berlin	Quadruple sculls
Bronze medal – third place	1969 Klagenfurt	Quadruple sculls

Dagmar Holst (born 29 November 1942) is a retired German rower for East Germany who won a gold, a silver and a bronze medal in the quadruple sculls at the European Rowing Championships of 1966, 1968 and 1969, respectively.

After marrying in 1968–1969, Holst competed as Dagmar Seipt or Dagmar Seipt-Holst.
