= Christa Mulack =

German theologian (1943–2021)

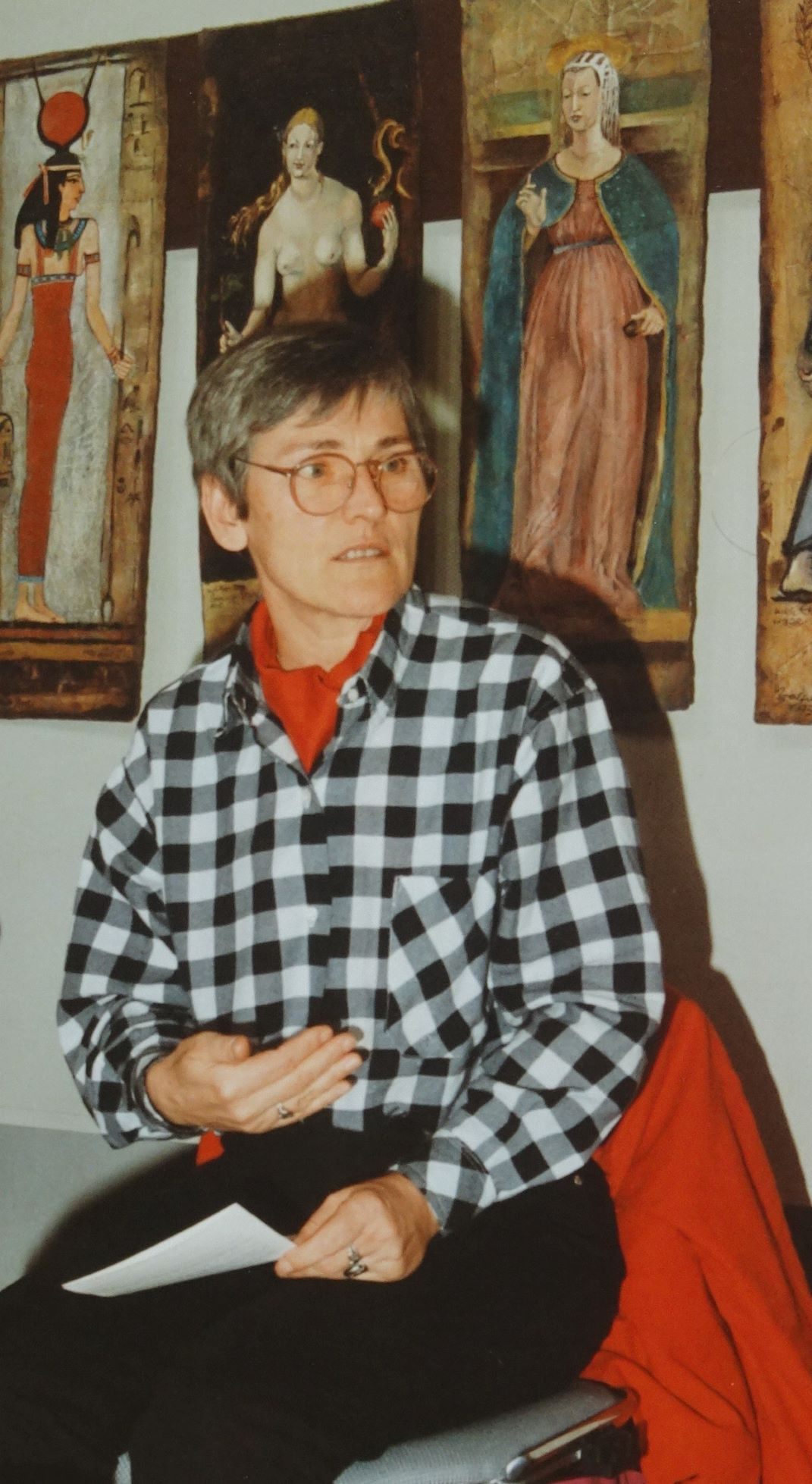
- Mulack in 1996
- Born: 30 October 1943; Hamburg. Germany
- Died: 22 July 2021 (aged 77)
- Occupations: Theologian, writer

Christa Mulack (30 October 1943 – 22 July 2021) was a German feminist theologian, educator and author.

== Life ==
Christa Mulack was born and grew up in Hamburg. She studied Theology, Psychology, Sociology and Teaching sciences. While working as a teacher at a Gymnasium (secondary school) she received her doctorate in 1982 from the University of Dortmund (as it was known at that time). Her dissertation, entitled "Die Weiblichkeit Gottes" (loosely, "God's Womanhood"), was published as a book in 1983, and established Mulack's reputation as a feminist theologian. The topic is one on which she worked as a freelance author and teacher at several universities and theological academies after 1984.

== Works ==
Her next significant publications were "Maria – die geheime Göttin im Christentum" ("Maria - Christianity's secret goddess") in 1985 and "Jesus – der Gesalbte der Frauen" (loosely, "Jesus - Anointed by women") in 1987. She based her selection of theoretical methodical analytical devices on the gender typologies identified by Carl Jung and on the Kabbalah.

In her work Mulack tries to liberate biblical texts from the powerful patriarchal gloss of the last two thousand years. She retains the Christian symbols, but wants to reform Christianity in a feminist way and reinstate a matriarchy that traces its origins back to earlier traditions. Under Mulack's model Jesus becomes the prototype of spiritually integrated men and matriarchal societies, positioned at the interface between patriarchy and matriarchy: With this restitution of the image of the mother and her beloved son, which over the ages flows through all religions, Jesus reconnects with the matriarchal world in which revelation was fashioned". (Note: "Mit dieser Reinstituierung des Bildes der Mutter und ihres Sohngeliebten, das über einen langen Zeitraum alle Religionen durchzieht, knüpft Jesus an die matriarchalische Welt wieder an, in der die Vorstellung geprägt worden war.")

Applying this prism, Mulack sees Jesus as the one anointed by women, with Mary Magdalene as the goddess figure and Jesus as her "beloved son". Under this reading, there are clear parallels between the "anointing stories" in the New Testament and the rituals around the "Great Mother" and related hero figures, as identified by Heide Göttner-Abendroth as the core element of matriarchal religions.

Mulack's 1993 book "… und wieder fühle ich mich schuldig" ("… and I'm feeling guilty again") moves away from themes relating directly to "God's Womanhood", and deals with feelings of guilt which, the author asserts, are typically found in women. She imputes social causes to the problem. Her 2006 book "Klara Hitler – Muttersein im Patriarchat" (loosely "Klara Hitler - Being a mother in the patriarchate"), describes the patriarchal family as the "stirrup holder of the Third Reich" , (Note: "... Steigbügelhalter des Dritten Reiches") and Klara Hitler as the archetypical patriarchal mother.
