= Christa Krammer =

Austrian politician (born 1944)

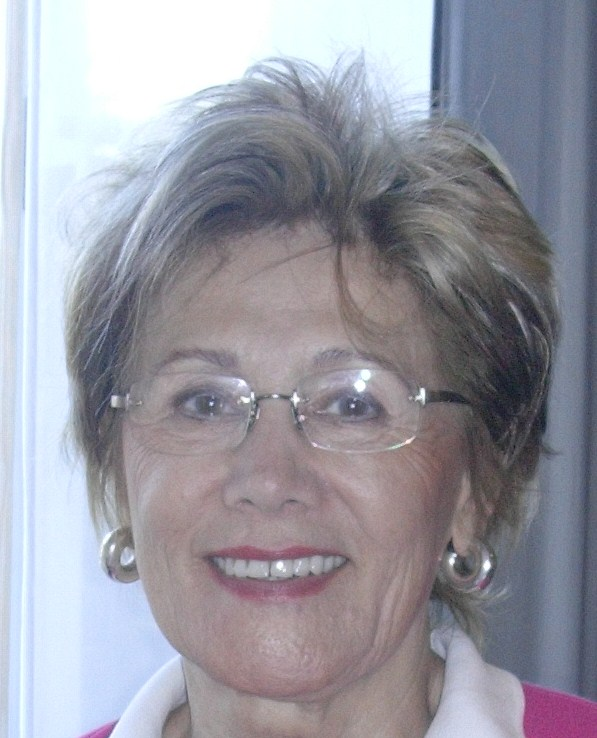
- Christa Krammer
- Born: 22 June 1944; Deutschkreutz, Austria
- Occupation: Politician

Christa Krammer (born 22 June 1944 in Deutschkreutz) is an Austrian politician.

A graduate in political science at the University of Vienna, she initially worked in banking and education. From 1984 to 1987 she was a director at the Federal Trade Academy (Bundeshandelsakademie) and Bundeshandelsschule Oberpullendorf.

From 1987 to 1994 Krammer was a member of the Burgenländischen Landesregierung (provincial government) and served as state councilor for culture, health and social affairs. From 1994 to 1997 she was Federal Minister for Health and Consumer Protection, and from 1997 to 1998 she was a member of parliament for the National Council. From 1999 to 2001 she was the Social Democratic Party of Austria representative in the Volksanwaltschaft, and thus one of the three Austrian Parliamentary Ombudsmen.
