= Wolfgang Gunkel =

East German rower (1948–2020)

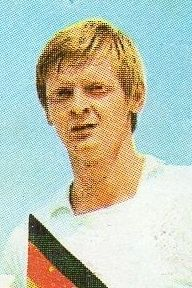
- Gunkel in 1972

Personal information
- Born: 15 January 1948 Berlin, Germany
- Died: 20 May 2020 (aged 72)
- Height: 192 cm (6 ft 4 in)
- Weight: 92 kg (203 lb)
- Spouse: Renate Boesler

Sport
- Sport: Rowing
- Club: Berliner TSC; SC Berlin-Grünau
Medal record
Men's rowing
Representing East Germany
Olympic Games
| Gold medal – first place | 1972 Munich | Coxed pair |
World Rowing Championships
| Silver medal – second place | 1974 Lucerne | Coxed pair |
| Gold medal – first place | 1975 Nottingham | Coxed pair |
| Gold medal – first place | 1977 Amsterdam | Eight |
European Rowing Championships
| Gold medal – first place | 1971 Copenhagen | Coxed pair |
| Silver medal – second place | 1973 Moscow | Coxed pair |

Wolfgang Gunkel (15 January 1948 – 20 May 2020) was an East German rower who mostly competed in coxed pairs together with Jörg Lucke. In this event he won the European title in 1971, the Olympic gold medal in 1972, and the world title in 1975. His crew placed fourth at the 1968 Olympics. Gunkel won another world title in the men's eight in 1977. In February 1978, he was given the sports awards Honoured Master of Sports.

In the early 1970s, he married fellow international rower Renate Boesler.
