= Heinz Schildan =

German ice hockey player

Medal record

Men's ice hockey

Representing East Germany

European Championships
Bronze medal – third place	1966 Ljubljana	Team

Heinz Schildan is a German ice hockey player, who competed for SG Dynamo Weißwasser. He won the bronze medal with the East Germany national ice hockey team at the 1966 European Championships.

Schildan played a total of 22 games for East Germany at the World Championships between 1961 and 1966, recording one assist.
