= Tatyana Gomolko =

Russian rower

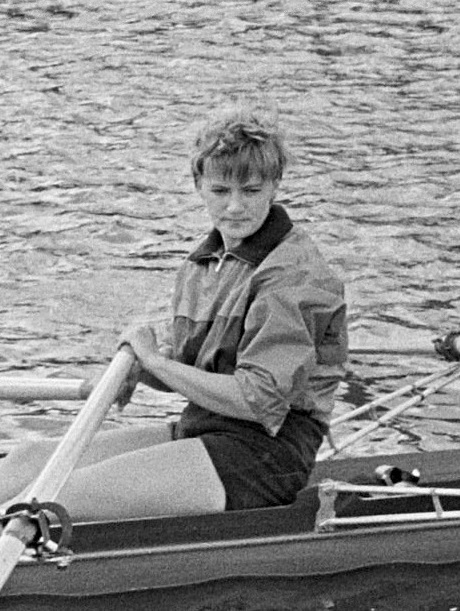
- Tatyana Gomolko in 1966

Personal information
- Born: 1940 Saint Petersburg, Russia
- Spouse: Nikolay Gomolko

Sport
- Sport: Rowing
Medal record
Representing the Soviet Union
European Rowing Championships
Bronze medal – third place	1966 Amsterdam	Double sculls
Gold medal – first place	1967 Vichy	Double sculls
Gold medal – first place	1969 Klagenfurt	Quad sculls
Silver medal – second place	1970 Tata	Quad sculls

Tatyana Ivanovna Gomolko (née Machigina in 1940, Russian: Татьяна Ивановна Мачигина (Гомолко)) is a retired Russian rower who won two European titles, in 1967 and 1969. Her husband Nikolay Gomolko also competed internationally in rowing.
