= Inge Schneider-Gabriel =

German rower

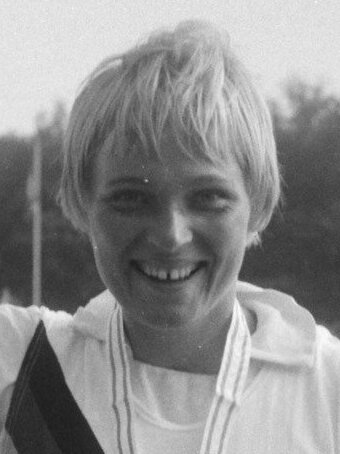
- Inge Schneider-Gabriel at the 1966 European Championships

Sport
- Sport: Rowing
- Club: SC Dynamo Berlin
Medal record
Women's rowing
Representing East Germany
European Rowing Championships
Gold medal – first place	1966 Amsterdam	Quadruple sculls
Silver medal – second place	1968 East Berlin	Quadruple sculls
Bronze medal – third place	1969 Klagenfurt	Quadruple sculls

Inge Schneider-Gabriel is a retired German rower who won a gold, a silver and a bronze medal in the quadruple sculls at the European championships of 1966, 1968 and 1969, respectively. After marrying between 1966 and 1968, she changed her last name from Gabriel to Schneider-Gabriel.
