= Erich Novy =

German ice hockey player

Medal record

Men's ice hockey

Representing East Germany

European Championships
Bronze medal – third place	1966 Ljubljana	Team

Erich Novy (5 February 1937 – 14 July 2016) was a German ice hockey player, who competed for SG Dynamo Weißwasser. He won the bronze medal with the East Germany national ice hockey team at the 1966 European Championships.

Novy played a total of 47 games for East Germany at the World Championships between 1957 and 1967, scoring a total of six goals and seven assists.
