= Karin Luck (rower) =

German rower

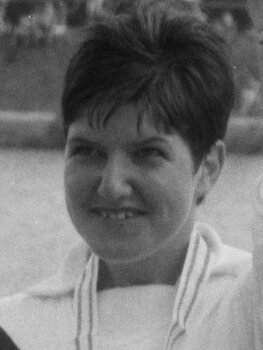
- Karin Bauschke in 1966

Sport
- Sport: Rowing
- Club: SC Dynamo Berlin
Medal record
Women's rowing
Representing East Germany
European Rowing Championships
Gold medal – first place	1966 Amsterdam	Quadruple sculls
Silver medal – second place	1968 East Berlin	Quadruple sculls
Bronze medal – third place	1969 Klagenfurt	Quadruple sculls
Silver medal – second place	1970 Tata	Coxed four

Karin Luck (later Bauschke-Luck) is a German rower who competed for the SC Dynamo Berlin / Sportvereinigung (SV) Dynamo. She is a retired German coxswain who won four medals at European championships from 1966 to 1970.
