= Christa Anbeek =

Dutch theologist and professor

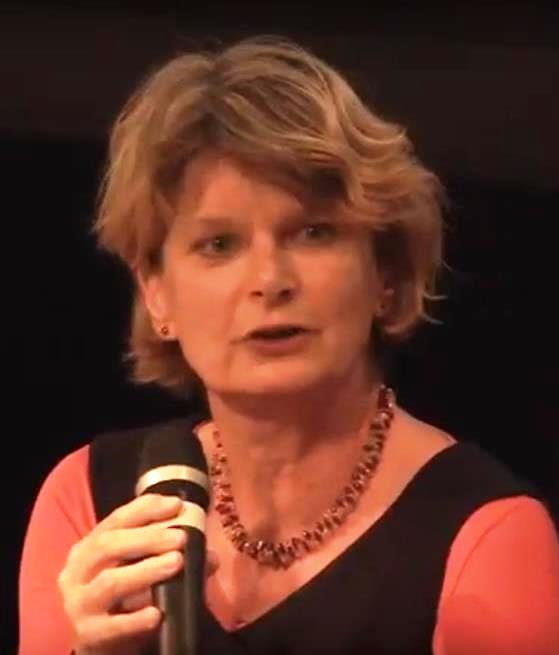
Christa Anbeek (2019)

Christa Anbeek (Barneveld, 1961) is a Dutch theologist, professor and rector of the Remonstrants seminary. In her position she is a major figure of the Remonstrants brotherhood, a faith community committed to a free and tolerant Christianity, in the Arminian tradition.

== Career ==
Anbeek was trained as a theologist and began her career as spiritual caregiver in a psychiatry department. In 2008 Anbeek became affiliated with the University of Humanistic Studies in Utrecht as senior lecturer. As of 2012, she works as extraordinary professor of Remonstrant Theology and rector of the Remonstrants Seminary at the VU University Amsterdam. In recent years she authored a triptych about the meaning of death, which appealed to a wider audience: Overlevingskunst ("Art of survival", 2010), The Art of Survival: Living with the Death of a Loved One ("Mountain of the soul", featuring Ada de Jong, 2013) and Aan de heidenen overgeleverd ("Delivered unto the gentiles", 2013). Vulnerability, end of life, and the art of living are important themes in her academic work.

== Publications (selection) ==
- Anbeek, C.W. (2018). Voor Joseph en zijn broer. Van overleven naar spelen en andere zaken van ultiem belang.
- Anbeek, C.W. (2014). Een pelgrimstocht naar de toekomst
- Anbeek, C.W. (2013). Delivered unto the Heathens (Aan de heidenen overgeleverd. Hoe theologie de 21ste eeuw kan overleven.)
- Anbeek, C.W. & Jong, A. de (2013). Mountain of the Soul: A Personal Essay on Fragile Life
- Anbeek, C.W. (2010). The Art of Survival: Living with the Death of a Loved One
