= List of Dynamo Sports Club sportspeople =

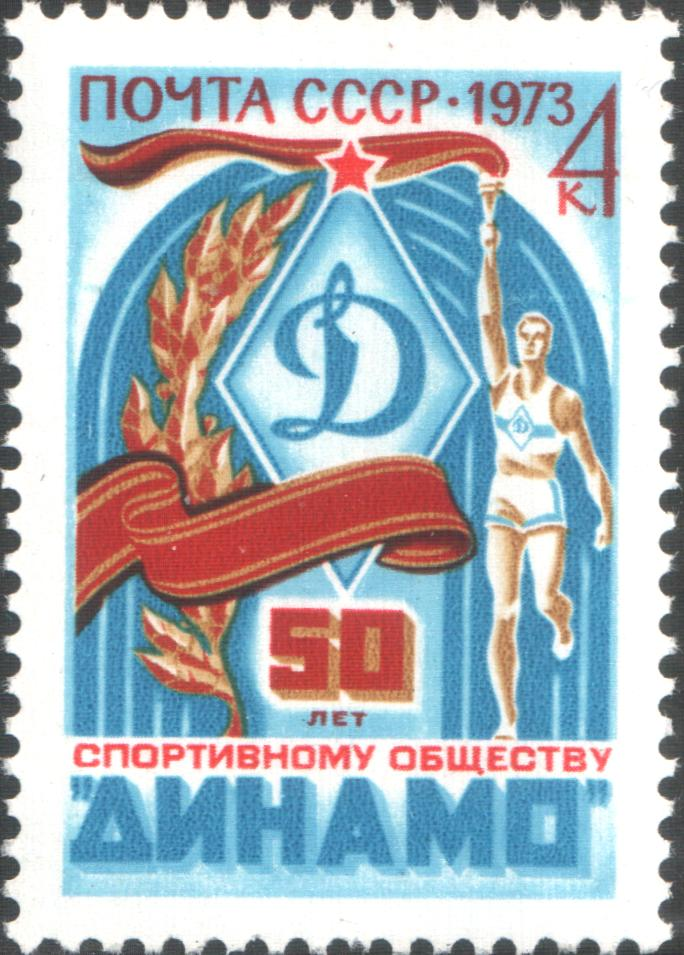
Stamp

This is a list of sportspeople from Dynamo sports society. Most of them are World Champions or Olympic medalists.

== Artistic gymnastics ==
Athletes, who competed in artistic gymnastics:

- Ludmilla Tourischeva
- Alexander Dityatin
- Sofia Muratova
- Natalia Shaposhnikova
- Aleksandr Tkachyov
- Mikhail Voronin
- Viktoria Komova
- Maria Paseka

== Athletics ==
Athletes, who competed in the sport of athletics:

- Aleksandr Aksinin
- Yevgeniy Arzhanov
- Mykola Avilov
- Mikhail Bariban
- Aleksandr Baryshnikov
- Natalya Bochina
- Valeriy Borzov
- Lyudmila Bragina
- Olga Bryzgina
- Viktor Bryzgin
- Aleksandra Chudina
- Nina Dumbadze
- Yevgeniy Gavrilenko
- Valentin Gavrilov
- Vladimir Goryaev
- Nadezhda Ilyina
- Inese Jaunzeme
- Bruno Junk
- Vladimir Kazantsev
- Vasiliy Khmelevskiy
- Nadezhda Khnykina-Dvalishvili
- Aleksandr Kornelyuk
- Valentina Kozyr
- Olena Krasovska
- Viktor Kravchenko
- Vitold Kreyer
- Vladimir Krylov
- Viktor Myasnikov
- Irina Nazarova
- Uno Palu
- Irina Press
- Vasily Rudenkov
- Viktor Saneyev
- Robert Shavlakadze
- Leonid Shcherbakov
- Natalya Sokolova
- Vladimir Sukharev
- Kęstutis Šapka
- Tatyana Talysheva
- Romas Ubartas
- Grigoriy Yegorov
- Sergei Zhelanov

== Basketball ==
Athletes, who competed in basketball:

- Aleksandr Boloshev
- Nodar Dzhordzhikiya
- Mikheil Korkia
- Otar Korkia
- Tatiana Ovechkina
- Yuri Ozerov
- Zurab Sakandelidze
- Viktor Vlasov

== Biathlon ==
Athletes, who competed in biathlon:

- Vladimir Barnashov
- Anfisa Reztsova
- Aleksandr Tikhonov

== Boxing ==
Athletes, who competed in boxing:

- Anatoli Bulakov
- Viktor Demyanenko
- Viktor Miroshnichenko
- Valeri Popenchenko
- Nurmagomed Shanavazov
- Valerian Sokolov
- Vyacheslav Yanovskiy

== Canoeing ==
Athletes, who competed in canoeing:

- Uladzimir Parfianovich
- Viktor Reneysky

== Cross-country skiing ==
Athletes, who competed in cross-country skiing:

- Oleksandr Batyuk
- Yevgeny Belyayev
- Alevtina Kolchina
- Pavel Kolchin
- Vladimir Kuzin
- Antonina Ordina
- Anfisa Reztsova
- Vasily (Pavlovich) Rochev
- Vasily (Vasilyevich) Rochev, (son of the above)
- Fyodor Simashev
- Yuliya Chepalova
- Vyacheslav Vedenin

== Cycling ==
Athletes, who competed in cycling:

- Artūras Kasputis
- Gintautas Umaras
- Laima Zilporytė

== Fencing ==
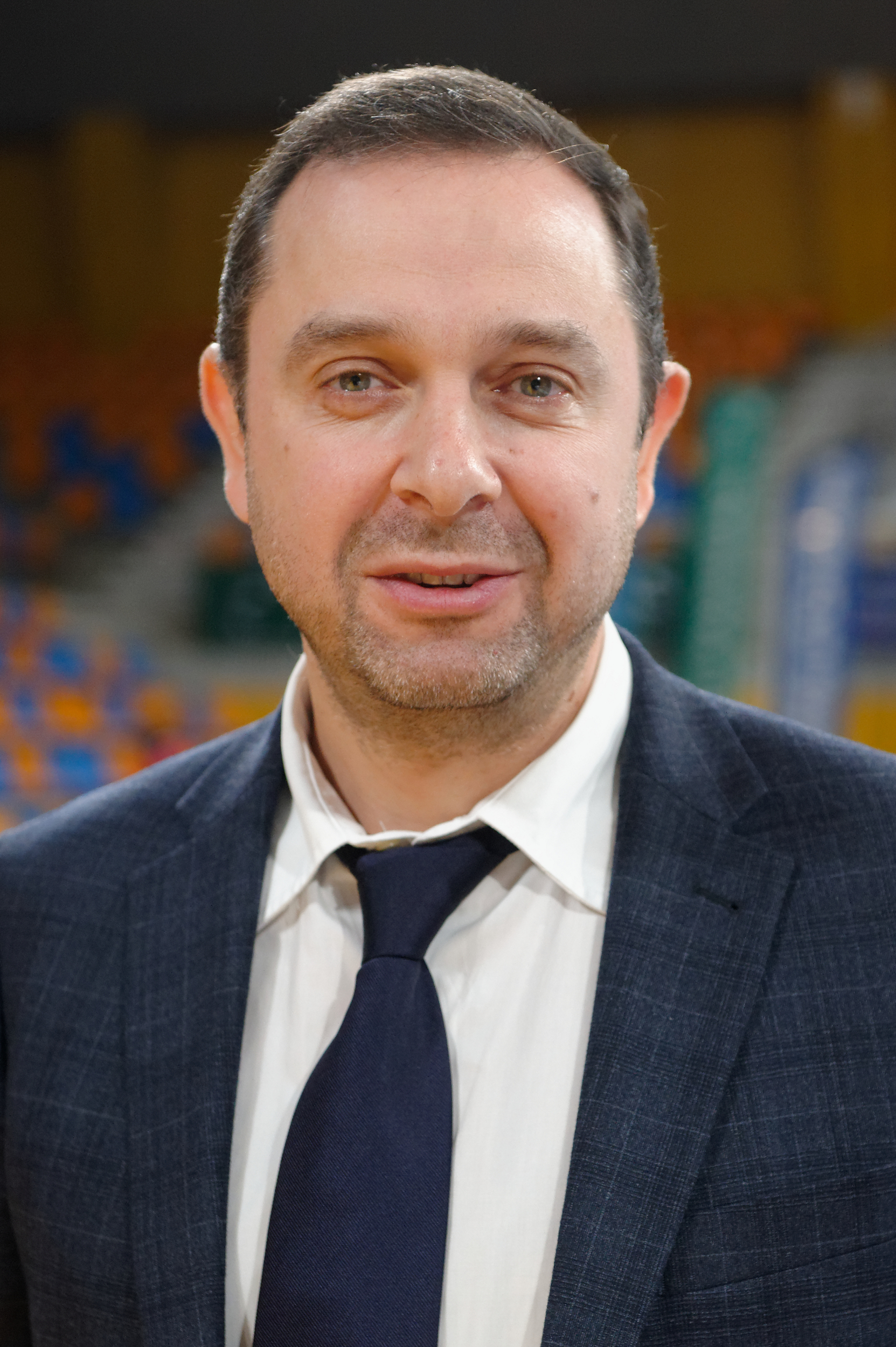
Vadym Gutzeit

Athletes, who competed in fencing:

- Vadym Gutzeit
- Alexandr Romankov
- Yakov Rylsky
- Igor Tikhomirov
- Iosif Vitebskiy

== Figure skating ==
Athletes, who competed in figure skating:

- Aleksandr Gorshkov
- Gennadi Karponossov
- Natalia Linichuk
- Lyudmila Pakhomova

== Football ==
Athletes, who competed in football:

- Oleg Blokhin
- Igor Dobrovolski
- Murtaz Khurtsilava
- Lev Yashin

== Handball ==
Athletes, who competed in handball:

- Vyacheslav Atavin

== Ice hockey ==
Athletes, who competed in ice hockey:

- Helmuts Balderis
- Zinetula Bilyaletdinov
- Aleksandr Maltsev
- Vasili Pervukhin
- Valeri Vasiliev

== Parachuting ==
- Jutta Irmscher

== Speed skating ==
Athletes, who competed in speed skating:

- Inga Artamonova
- Viktor Kosichkin
- Rimma Zhukova

== Swimming ==
Athletes, who competed in swimming:

- Igor Polyansky

== Tennis ==
Athletes, who competed in tennis:

- Alex Metreveli

== Weightlifting ==
Athletes, who competed in weightlifting:

- Oksen Mirzoian
- Anatoly Pisarenko
- Yury Zakharevich

== Wrestling ==
Athletes who competed in wrestling:

- Sergei Beloglazov

== See also ==
- Dynamo sports society
