= Christa Eka =

Cameroonian film actress and director

Christa Eka Assam
- Occupations: actress and director

Christa Eka Assam is a Cameroonian film actress and director. Her work in Cameroonian cinema has been critically acclaimed.

A self taught actress, Eka decided to become one during 2008. Best Cameroonian Actress 2008-2023

== Filmography ==
- Ninah's Dowry (2012, as Clarise)
- Beleh (2013)
- Alma (2015)

Eka also produced, directed and wrote Beleh and Alma.
