= Ursula Pankraths =

East German rower

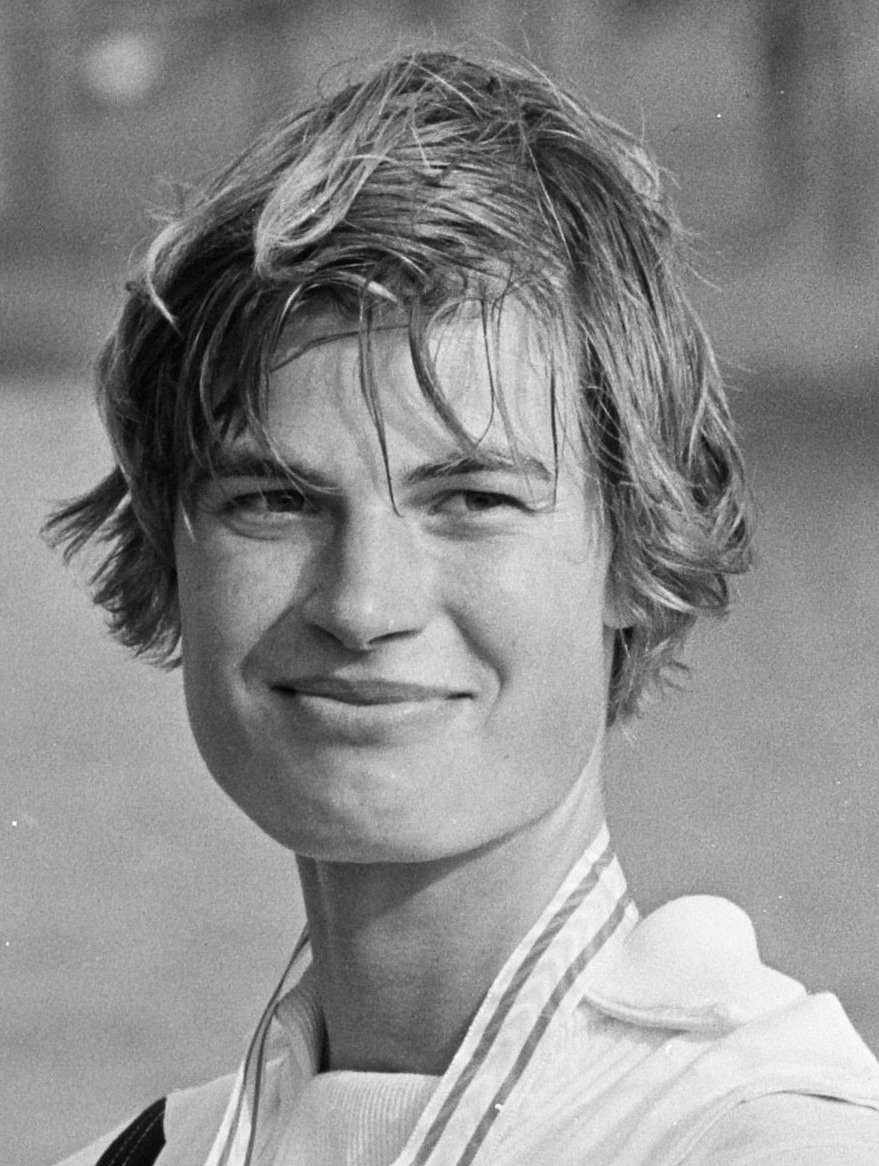
- Ursula Pankraths after winning the European doubles title in 1966

Sport
- Sport: Rowing
- Club: SG Dynamo Potsdam
Medal record
Representing East Germany
European Rowing Championships
Bronze medal – third place	1961 Prague	Quad scull
Silver medal – second place	1962 East Berlin	Double scull
Gold medal – first place	1966 Amsterdam	Double scull
Silver medal – second place	1967 Vichy	Double scull
Gold medal – first place	1968 East Berlin	Eight
Gold medal – first place	1969 Klagenfurt	Eight

Ursula Pankraths is a retired East German rower who won six medals at European championships between 1961 and 1969, including three gold medals.
