= Gabriele Kelm =

German rower

Medal record

Women's rowing

Representing East Germany

European Rowing Championships
| Gold medal – first place | 1968 East Berlin | Eight |
| Gold medal – first place | 1969 Klagenfurt | Eight |
| Gold medal – first place | 1970 Tata | Eight |

Gabriele Kelm (later Gabriele Rotermund-Kelm) is a German former rower who competed for SC Dynamo Berlin / Sportvereinigung (SV) Dynamo. She won medals at international rowing competitions representing East Germany.
