= Rowing at the 1972 Summer Olympics – Men's eight =

Men's eight at the Games of the XX Olympiad
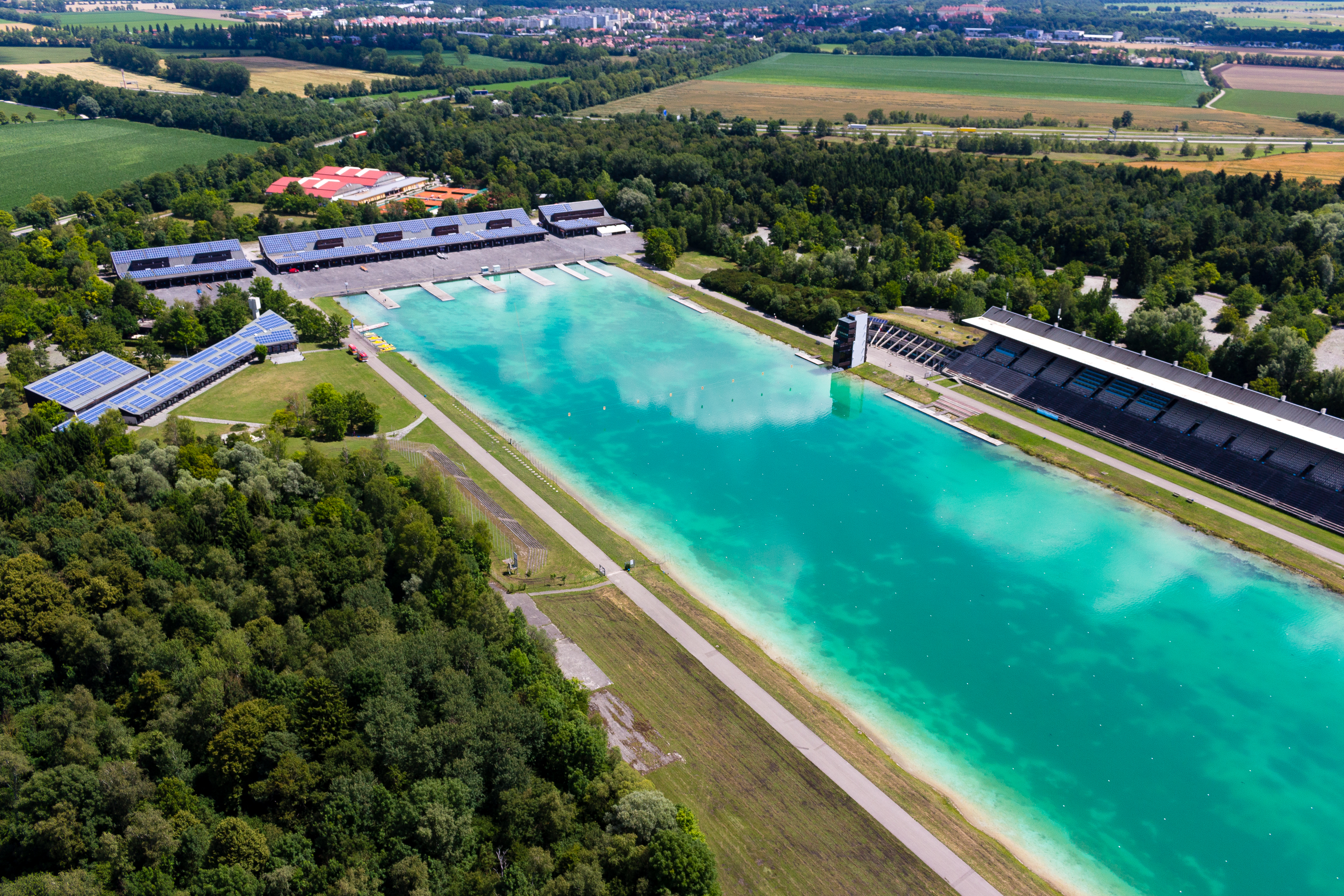
- Aerial view of the venue in Oberschleißheim
- Venue: Oberschleißheim Regatta Course
- Dates: 27 August – 2 September 1972
- Competitors: 135 from 15 nations
- Winning time: 6:08.94

Medalists
1st place, gold medalist(s)		New Zealand: Tony Hurt; Wybo Veldman; Dick Joyce; John Hunter; Lindsay Wilson; Joe Earl; Trevor Coker; Gary Robertson; Simon Dickie
2nd place, silver medalist(s)		United States: Lawrence Terry; Franklin Hobbs; Pete Raymond; Tim Mickelson; Gene Clapp; Bill Hobbs; Cleve Livingston; Mike Livingston; Paul Hoffman
3rd place, bronze medalist(s)		East Germany: Hans-Joachim Borzym; Jörg Landvoigt; Harold Dimke; Manfred Schneider; Hartmut Schreiber; Manfred Schmorde; Bernd Landvoigt; Heinrich Mederow; Dietmar Schwarz

The men's eight competition at the 1972 Summer Olympics in Munich took place from 27 August to 2 September at the Olympic Regatta Course in Oberschleißheim. There were 15 boats (135 competitors) from 15 nations, with each nation limited to a single boat in the event. The event was won by New Zealand, the nation's first medal in the men's eight. Silver went to the United States. East Germany also earned its first medal in the event, with bronze.

== Background ==
This was the 16th appearance of the event. Rowing had been on the programme in 1896 but was cancelled due to bad weather. The men's eight has been held every time that rowing has been contested, beginning in 1900.

An event that for decades had been almost entirely predictable had a competitive field in 1972. The United States had won this event at eight of the last ten Olympics, but only one of the last three (1964). West Germany was the defending Olympic champion (and, as part of the United Team of Germany, had won in 1960 as well). Argentina had won the 1971 Pan American Games. East Germany were the 1969 European Rowing Championships winners, 1970 World Rowing Championships winners, and 1971 European Rowing Championships runners-up. The Soviet Union had reached the podium at the 1969 European, 1970 World, and 1971 European events. New Zealand's eight had, in identical composition, won the 1971 European Rowing Championships.

Austria made its debut in the event. The United States made its 14th appearance, most among nations to that point.

== Competition format ==
The "eight" event featured nine-person boats, with eight rowers and a coxswain. It was a sweep rowing event, with the rowers each having one oar (and thus each rowing on one side). This rowing competition consisted of three main rounds (quarterfinals, semifinals, and finals; up from two main rounds in prior Games), as well as a repechage round after the quarterfinals. The course used the 2000 metres distance that became the Olympic standard in 1912 (with the exception of 1948). Races were held in up to six lanes.

- Quarterfinals: Three heats with five boats each. The top three boats in each heat (9 total) advanced directly to the semifinals; the 4th and 5th place boats in each heat (6 boats) went to the repechage.
- Repechage: A single heat of six boats. The top three boats went to the semifinals, with the bottom three boats eliminated.
- Semifinals: Two heats with six boats each. The top three boats in each semifinal (6 boats total) went to the "A" final, while the bottom three boats in each went to the "B" final (out of medal contention).
- Finals: The "A" final consisted of the top six boats, competing for the medals and 4th through 6th place. The "B" final had the next six boats; they competed for 7th through 12th place.

== Schedule ==
All times are Central European Time (UTC+1)

Date	Time	Round
Sunday, 27 August 1972	14:00	Quarterfinals
Tuesday, 29 August 1972	14:00	Repechage
Thursday, 31 August 1972	11:30	Semifinals
Friday, 1 September 1972	10:00	Final B
Saturday, 2 September 1972	13:00	Final A

== Results ==
=== Quarterfinals ===
The top three of each heat qualified to the semifinal round, while the remainder went to the repechage.

==== Quarterfinal 1 ====
Rank	Rowers	Coxswain	Nation	Time	Notes
1	Lawrence Terry; Franklin Hobbs; Pete Raymond; Tim Mickelson; Gene Clapp; Bill Hobbs; Cleve Livingston; Mike Livingston	Paul Hoffman	United States	6:06.01	Q
2	Reinhard Wendemuth; Frithjof Henckel; Norbert Kindlmann; Wolfgang Hottenrott; Hans-Ulrich Buchholz; Günter Petersmann; Bernd Truschinski; Winfried Ringwald	Manfred Klein	West Germany	6:10.28	Q
3	Martin Hinterleitner; Norbert Hlobil; Kurt Sandhäugl; Peter Preiß; Manfred Ruthner; Peter Bredl; Karl Sinzinger; Franz Nitsche	Peter Wetzstein	Austria	6:20.60	Q
4	Renzo Bulgarello; Gianfranco Grasselli; Francesco Pigozzo; Giuliano Galiazzo; Giuseppe Noal; Maurizio Danielli; Serafino Carminati; Giuliano Rossi	Mariano Gottifredi	Italy	6:21.80	R
5	Jean-Luc Correia; Bernard Bruand; Jean-Jacques Mulot; Philippe Cabut; Jean Perrot; Jacques Filippini; Yves Oger; Gérard Boyer	Yves Rebelle	France	6:32.47	R

==== Quarterfinal 2 ====
Rank	Rowers	Coxswain	Nation	Time	Notes
1	Tony Hurt; Wybo Veldman; Dick Joyce; John Hunter; Lindsay Wilson; Joe Earl; Trevor Coker; Gary Robertson	Simon Dickie	New Zealand	6:06.19	Q
2	Zoltán Melis; András Pályi; Antal Gelley; Béla Zsitnik Jr.; László Romvári; Péter Kokas; Imre Dávid; Ágoston Bányai	Róbert Örlschléger	Hungary	6:17.51	Q
3	Juan Carlos Estol; Ignacio Ruiz; Guillermo Segurado; Héctor Biassini; Ricardo José Rodríguez; Alfredo Martín; Oscar de Dios; Hugo Aberastegui	Raúl Mazerati	Argentina	6:20.31	Q
4	Jerzy Ulczyński; Marian Siejkowski; Krzysztof Marek; Jan Młodzikowski; Grzegorz Stellak; Marian Drażdżewski; Ryszard Giło; Sławomir Maciejowski	Ryszard Kubiak	Poland	6:26.95	R
5	Josip Despot; Zdravko Gracin; Mladen Ninić; Romano Bajlo; Zdravko Huljev; Stevo Macura; Janez Grbelja; Josip Bajlo	Jadran Radovčić	Yugoslavia	6:27.82	R

==== Quarterfinal 3 ====
Rank	Rowers	Coxswain	Nation	Time	Notes
1	Aleksandr Ryazankin; Viktor Dementyev; Sergey Kolyaskin; Aleksandr Shitov; Valery Bisarnov; Boris Vorobyov; Vladimir Savelov; Aleksandr Martyshkin	Viktor Mikheyev	Soviet Union	6:12.35	Q
2	Henk Rouwé; Jannes Munneke; Frank Mulder; Jan van der Vliet; Herman Eggink; Hans Huisinga; Bram Tuinzing; Pieter Offens	Rutger Stuffken	Netherlands	6:13.03	Q
3	Hans-Joachim Borzym; Jörg Landvoigt; Harold Dimke; Manfred Schneider; Hartmut Schreiber; Manfred Schmorde; Bernd Landvoigt; Heinrich Mederow	Dietmar Schwarz	East Germany	6:14.06	Q
4	John Clark; Michael Morgan; Bryan Curtin; Richard Curtin; Robert Paver; Kerry Jelbart; Gary Pearce; Malcolm Shaw	Alan Grover	Australia	6:14.75	R
5	Ladislav Lorenc; Zdeněk Zika; Pavel Konvička; Zdeněk Kuba; Ladislav Heythum; Milan Suchopár; Miroslav Vraštil; Oldřich Kruták	Jiří Pták	Czechoslovakia	6:17.70	R

=== Repechage ===
The top three finishers advanced to the semifinal round and the other teams were eliminated.

Rank	Rowers	Coxswain	Nation	Time	Notes
1	John Clark; Michael Morgan; Bryan Curtin; Richard Curtin; Robert Paver; Kerry Jelbart; Gary Pearce; Malcolm Shaw	Alan Grover	Australia	6:09.75	Q
2	Ladislav Lorenc; Zdeněk Zika; Pavel Konvička; Zdeněk Kuba; Ladislav Heythum; Milan Suchopár; Miroslav Vraštil; Oldřich Kruták	Jiří Pták	Czechoslovakia	6:14.33	Q
3	Jerzy Ulczyński; Marian Siejkowski; Krzysztof Marek; Jan Młodzikowski; Grzegorz Stellak; Marian Drażdżewski; Ryszard Giło; Sławomir Maciejowski	Ryszard Kubiak	Poland	6:16.23	Q
4	Jean-Luc Correia; Bernard Bruand; Jean-Jacques Mulot; Philippe Cabut; Jean Perrot; Jacques Filippini; Yves Oger; Gérard Boyer	Yves Rebelle	France	6:19.58	
5	Renzo Bulgarello; Gianfranco Grasselli; Francesco Pigozzo; Giuliano Galiazzo; Giuseppe Noal; Maurizio Danielli; Serafino Carminati; Giuliano Rossi	Mariano Gottifredi	Italy	6:20.21	
6	Josip Despot; Zdravko Gracin; Mladen Ninić; Romano Bajlo; Zdravko Huljev; Stevo Macura; Janez Grbelja; Josip Bajlo	Jadran Radovčić	Yugoslavia	6:25.94	

=== Semifinals ===
The top three finishers qualified for Final A, with the remainder going to Final B.

==== Semifinal 1 ====
Rank	Rowers	Coxswain	Nation	Time	Notes
1	Hans-Joachim Borzym; Jörg Landvoigt; Harold Dimke; Manfred Schneider; Hartmut Schreiber; Manfred Schmorde; Bernd Landvoigt; Heinrich Mederow	Dietmar Schwarz	East Germany	6:22.47	QA
2	Aleksandr Ryazankin; Viktor Dementyev; Sergey Kolyaskin; Aleksandr Shitov; Valery Bisarnov; Boris Vorobyov; Vladimir Savelov; Aleksandr Martyshkin	Viktor Mikheyev	Soviet Union	6:24.80	QA
3	Lawrence Terry; Franklin Hobbs; Pete Raymond; Tim Mickelson; Gene Clapp; Bill Hobbs; Cleve Livingston; Mike Livingston	Paul Hoffman	United States	6:27.53	QA
4	Zoltán Melis; András Pályi; Antal Gelley; Béla Zsitnik Jr.; László Romvári; Péter Kokas; Imre Dávid; Ágoston Bányai	Róbert Örlschléger	Hungary	6:32.25	QB
5	Ladislav Lorenc; Zdeněk Zika; Pavel Konvička; Zdeněk Kuba; Ladislav Heythum; Milan Suchopár; Miroslav Vraštil; Oldřich Kruták	Jiří Pták	Czechoslovakia	6:38.70	QB
6	Martin Hinterleitner; Norbert Hlobil; Kurt Sandhäugl; Peter Preiß; Manfred Ruthner; Peter Bredl; Karl Sinzinger; Franz Nitsche	Peter Wetzstein	Austria	7:05.51	QB

==== Semifinal 2 ====
Rank	Rowers	Coxswain	Nation	Time	Notes
1	Reinhard Wendemuth; Frithjof Henckel; Norbert Kindlmann; Wolfgang Hottenrott; Hans-Ulrich Buchholz; Günter Petersmann; Bernd Truschinski; Winfried Ringwald	Manfred Klein	West Germany	6:27.44	QA
2	Tony Hurt; Wybo Veldman; Dick Joyce; John Hunter; Lindsay Wilson; Joe Earl; Trevor Coker; Gary Robertson	Simon Dickie	New Zealand	6:28.40	QA
3	Jerzy Ulczyński; Marian Siejkowski; Krzysztof Marek; Jan Młodzikowski; Grzegorz Stellak; Marian Drażdżewski; Ryszard Giło; Sławomir Maciejowski	Ryszard Kubiak	Poland	6:31.10	QA
4	Henk Rouwé; Jannes Munneke; Frank Mulder; Jan van der Vliet; Herman Eggink; Hans Huisinga; Bram Tuinzing; Pieter Offens	Rutger Stuffken	Netherlands	6:31.70	QB
5	John Clark; Michael Morgan; Bryan Curtin; Richard Curtin; Robert Paver; Kerry Jelbart; Gary Pearce; Malcolm Shaw	Alan Grover	Australia	6:34.82	QB
6	Juan Carlos Estol; Ignacio Ruiz; Guillermo Segurado; Héctor Biassini; Ricardo José Rodríguez; Alfredo Martín; Oscar de Dios; Hugo Aberastegui	Raúl Mazerati	Argentina	6:47.72	QB

=== Finals ===
==== Final B ====
Rank	Rowers	Coxswain	Nation	Time
7	Zoltán Melis; András Pályi; Antal Gelley; Béla Zsitnik Jr.; László Romvári; Péter Kokas; Imre Dávid; Ágoston Bányai	Róbert Örlschléger	Hungary	6:22.13
8	John Clark; Michael Morgan; Bryan Curtin; Richard Curtin; Robert Paver; Kerry Jelbart; Gary Pearce; Malcolm Shaw	Alan Grover	Australia	6:22.45
9	Henk Rouwé; Jannes Munneke; Frank Mulder; Jan van der Vliet; Herman Eggink; Hans Huisinga; Bram Tuinzing; Pieter Offens	Rutger Stuffken	Netherlands	6:23.55
10	Ladislav Lorenc; Zdeněk Zika; Pavel Konvička; Zdeněk Kuba; Ladislav Heythum; Milan Suchopár; Miroslav Vraštil; Oldřich Kruták	Jiří Pták	Czechoslovakia	6:24.64
11	Juan Carlos Estol; Ignacio Ruiz; Guillermo Segurado; Héctor Biassini; Ricardo José Rodríguez; Alfredo Martín; Oscar de Dios; Hugo Aberastegui	Raúl Mazerati	Argentina	6:26.03
12	Martin Hinterleitner; Norbert Hlobil; Kurt Sandhäugl; Peter Preiß; Manfred Ruthner; Peter Bredl; Karl Sinzinger; Franz Nitsche	Peter Wetzstein	Austria	6:27.86

==== Final A ====
Rank	Rowers	Coxswain	Nation	Time
1st place, gold medalist(s)	Tony Hurt; Wybo Veldman; Dick Joyce; John Hunter; Lindsay Wilson; Joe Earl; Trevor Coker; Gary Robertson	Simon Dickie	New Zealand	6:08.94
2nd place, silver medalist(s)	Lawrence Terry; Franklin Hobbs; Pete Raymond; Tim Mickelson; Gene Clapp; Bill Hobbs; Cleve Livingston; Mike Livingston	Paul Hoffman	United States	6:11.61
3rd place, bronze medalist(s)	Hans-Joachim Borzym; Jörg Landvoigt; Harold Dimke; Manfred Schneider; Hartmut Schreiber; Manfred Schmorde; Bernd Landvoigt; Heinrich Mederow	Dietmar Schwarz	East Germany	6:11.67
4	Aleksandr Ryazankin; Viktor Dementyev; Sergey Kolyaskin; Aleksandr Shitov; Valery Bisarnov; Boris Vorobyov; Vladimir Savelov; Aleksandr Martyshkin	Viktor Mikheyev	Soviet Union	6:14.48
5	Reinhard Wendemuth; Frithjof Henckel; Norbert Kindlmann; Wolfgang Hottenrott; Hans-Ulrich Buchholz; Günter Petersmann; Bernd Truschinski; Winfried Ringwald	Manfred Klein	West Germany	6:14.91
6	Jerzy Ulczyński; Marian Siejkowski; Krzysztof Marek; Jan Młodzikowski; Grzegorz Stellak; Marian Drażdżewski; Ryszard Giło; Sławomir Maciejowski	Ryszard Kubiak	Poland	6:29.35
