= G.S.R. Aegir =

Groningen Student Rowing Club Aegir

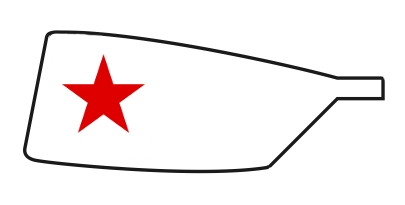
- Location: Winschoterdiep, Groningen, The Netherlands
- Founded: 7 February 1878
- Membership: ~ 900
- Affiliations: Groninger Studentencorps Vindicat atque Polit
- Website: www.gsraegir.nl

Events
- The Varsity

The Groningen Student Rowing Club Aegir (Dutch: Groninger Studenten Roeivereniging Aegir, GSR Aegir) is a Dutch rowing club, founded 7 February 1878 as a subsidiary organization of Vindicat atque Polit, a Groningen Student Corporation. GSR Aegir is located at the Winschoterdiep, and, as of 2023 has approximately 900 members.

Aegir has won The Varsity, a student rowing event of The Netherlands modelled on the Oxford and Cambridge Boat Race, a total of 6 times.

For the 1972 Summer Olympics GSR Aegir provided the whole crew for the Dutch eight. In recent years Aegir rower Reinder Lubbers was part of the Olympic Crew.

== Rowing races ==
GSR Aegir organises a few rowing events each year:

- Martini Regatta - Aegir organises this rowing event in collaboration with A.G.S.R. Gyas and the Royal Groningen Rowing Club 'De Hunze'.
- Hel van het Noorden - A time trial race for the single scull or coxless pair.
- Studenten Roeiregatta Groningen - A rowing race exclusively for students in the Netherlands.
- Chris Heuvelman Wielerclassic - A road bicycle racing event.

== Honours ==
=== Henley Royal Regatta ===
Year	Races won
1970	Ladies' Challenge Plate

== Notable (former) members ==
- Joost Adema (born 1959), rower
- Stef Blok (born 1964), politician
- Herman Eggink (born 1949), rower
- Sybrand van Haersma Buma (born 1965), politician
- Sjoerd Hoekstra (born 1959), rower
- Hans Huisinga (born 1950), rower
- Reinder Lubbers (born 1984), rower and cricket player
- Frank Mulder (born 1946), rower
- Jannes Munneke (born 1949), rower
- Ingrid Munneke-Dusseldorp (born 1946), rower
- Pieter Offens (born 1946), rower
- Henk Rouwé (born 1946), rower
- Rutger Stuffken (born 1947), rower
- Melvin Twellaar (born 1996), rower
- Bram Tuinzing (born 1948), rower
- Jan van der Vliet (born 1949), rower
