= Banyai =

Banyai or Bányai is a surname. Notable people with the surname include:

- Ágoston Bányai (born 1950), Hungarian rower
- Gábor Bányai (born 1969), Hungarian parliamentarian
- Istvan Banyai (1949–2022), Hungarian illustrator and animator
- Júlia Bányai (1824–1883), freedom fighter
- Márk Bányai (born 1999), Romanian-Hungarian water polo player
- Nándor Bányai (1928–2003), Hungarian football player and manager
