= Kokas =

Kokas is a surname of several origins. Notable people with this surname include:

- Andreas Kokas, Greek footballer
- Dimos Kokas, Greek footballer
- Katalin Kokas, Hungarian violinist
- Klára B. Kokas (1907–1962), Hungarian art director
- Leonidas Kokas, Greek weightlifter
- Péter Kokas, Hungarian rower
- Raphael Kokas, Austrian cyclist
- Viktória Kokas, Hungarian handballer
