= CUS Pallamano L'Aquila =

Pallamano L'Aquila
- Full name: CUS Pallamano L'Aquila
- Founded: 1969
- Ground: Pala Sandolo
- Capacity: 250
- Chairman: Maurizio Blair
- Head coach: Francesco Bizzarri
- League: Serie B, Girone Marche-Abruzzo
- Website: pallamanoaq.it
| Home colours | Away colours |

Pallamano L'Aquila is a handball team from city of L'Aquila currently plays in serie B group Marche-Abruzzo.

== Story ==
With more than 40 years of history, in the season 1980/81 played in the second league of Italian Championship CUS Pallamano L'Aquila born by the fusion between il Cus pallamano L'Aquila e Handball Club L'Aquila in the 2002. In the recent past (before the fu 2002/03 season) played in the Serie B missing promotion to A2 by a single point. The lack of economic resources has forced the company to a change in strategy, focusing resources exclusively on the youth sector. In 2009, despite the difficulties caused by the L'Aquila earthquake, the team has achieved promotion from Serie C to B with 1st place

== Current squad 2016–17 ==
Goalkeeper

- 31 (Italy) Simone Fagioli
- 81 (Italy) Giuliano Rossi

Left Wingers

- 1 (Italy) Daniele Lozzi
- 3 (Italy) Pietro Forcella
- 7 (Italy) Andrea De Sanctis
- 17 (Spain) Francisco Espinosa Cotreras

Right Wingers

- 22 (Jordan) Mohammad Ahmad
- 94 (Italy) Gino De Meo
- 99 (Italy) Alessandro Liberati

Line player

- 2 (Italy) Domenico Tedeschini
- 4 (Italy) Piergiorgio Patrizii
- 8 (Italy) Luigi Fradiani
- 21 (Italy) Gianluca Nappo
- 23 (Italy) Gabriele Grimaldi

Left Backs

- 17 (Portugal) Rafael Lacerda Vidal
- 55 (Italy) Pietro Colicchia
- 69 (Italy) Stefano Scotti

Central Backs

- 10 (Italy) Gino Pucci
- 11 (Italy) Gianmarco Blair
- 63 (Italy) Giuseppe Berti-De Marinis

Right Backs

- 9 (Italy) Luca Santucci

== Rank history ==
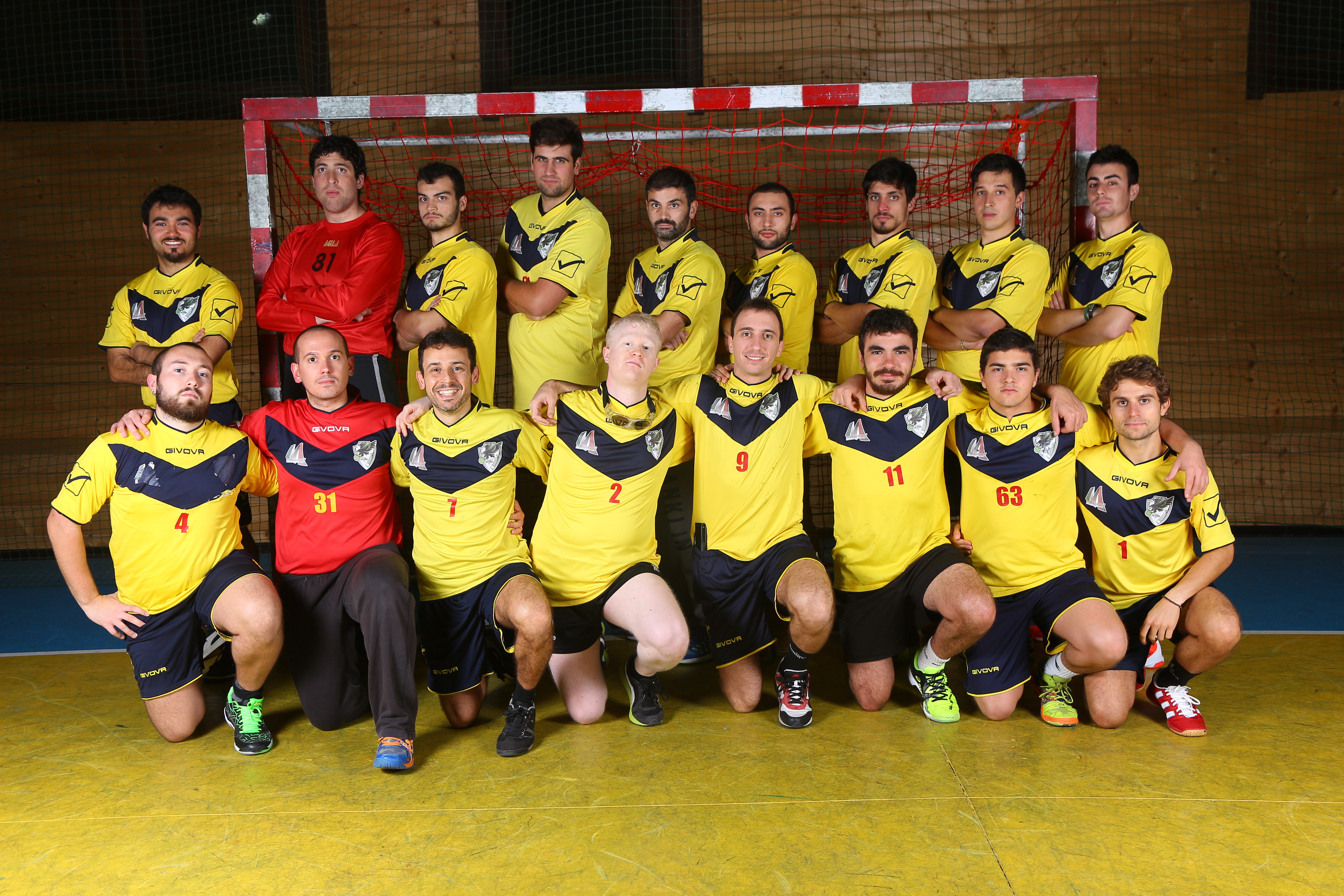

| Year | League | Place | Name |
|---|---|---|---|
| 1980/81 | B | 10° | L'Aquila Fayer |
| 1981/82 | C | 10° | L'Aquila Fayer |
| 1982/83 | C | 10° | L'Aquila Fayer |
| 1983/84 | D | 3° | L'Aquila Rugby |
| 1984/85 | D | 1° | L'Aquila Rugby |
| 1985/86 | D | 5° | GS L'Aquila |
| 1986/87 | D | 4° | H.C. L'Aquila |
| 1987/88 | C | 3° | H.C. L'Aquila |
| 1988/89 | C | 1° | H.C. L'Aquila |
| 1989/90 | B | 8° | H.C. L'Aquila |
| 1990/91 | B | 10° | H.C. L'Aquila |
| 1996/97 | C | 2° | L'Aquila Rugby |
| 1997/98 | B | 9° | L'Aquila Rugby |
| 1998/99 | C | 4° | L'Aquila Rugby |
| 1999/00 | C | 3° | L'Aquila Rugby |
| 2000/01 | C | 1° | L'Aquila Rugby |
| 2001/02 | B | 3° | L'Aquila Pallamano |
| 2002/03 | B | 2° | Edilbelvedere L'Aquila |
| 2003/04 | C | 1° | Cus L'Aquila |
| 2004/05 | B | 5° | Cus L'Aquila |
| 2005/06 | B | 6° | Cus L'Aquila |
| 2006/07 | C | 1° | Cus L'Aquila |
| 2007/08 | C | 3° | Cus L'Aquila |
| 2008/09 | C | 1° | Cus L'Aquila |
| 2009/10 | B | 5° | Cus L'Aquila |
| 2010/11 | A2 | 8° | Cus L'Aquila |
| 2011/12 | A2 | 6° | Cus L'Aquila |
| 2012/13 | B | 6° | ASD C-Us L'Aquila |
| 2013/14 | B | 6° | Cus L'Aquila |
| 2014/15 | B | 6° | Cus L'Aquila |
| 2015/16 | B | 5° | CUS Pallamano L'Aquila |
| 2016/17 | B | 4° | CUS Pallamano L'Aquila |
