= Alfredo Martín =

Alfredo Martín can refer to:

- Alfredo Martín (footballer)
- Alfredo Martín (rower)
