= Borzym (surname) =

Borzym is a Polish surname. Notable people with the surname include:

- Hans-Joachim Borzym (born 1948), East German rower
- Monika Borzym (born 1990), Polish jazz singer
