= Kindlmann =

Kindlmann is a German surname. Notable people with the surname include:

- Dieter Kindlmann (born 1982), German tennis player
- Gordon Kindlmann, American computer scientist
- Norbert Kindlmann (1944–2023), German rower
