= Klaus-Peter =

Klaus-Peter is a German masculine given name. Notable people with the name include:

- Klaus-Peter Ebeling (born 1944), East German sprint canoeist
- Klaus Peter Foppke, German rower
- Klaus-Peter Göpfert (born 1948), German former wrestler
- Klaus-Peter Hanisch (1952–2009), German footballer
- Klaus-Peter Hennig (born 1947), former discus thrower
- Klaus-Peter Hildenbrand (born 1952), West German athlete who competed in the 5000 metres
- Klaus-Peter Justus (born 1951), East German middle-distance runner
- Klaus-Peter Kerkemeier (born 1951), German football midfielder
- Klaus-Peter Lesch, German clinical psychiatrist
- Klaus-Peter Müller (born 1944), German banker
- Klaus-Peter Sabotta, extortionist who sabotaged German railways in December 1998
- Klaus-Peter Schneider (born 1964), retired German javelin thrower
- Klaus-Peter Siegloch (born 1946), German journalist
- Klaus-Peter Thaler (born 1949), German professional cyclist between 1976 and 1988
- Klaus-Peter Willsch (born 1961), German politician (CDU)
