= Bryan Curtin =

Australian rower

Personal information
- Nationality: Australian
- Born: 4 July 1949 (age 75)
- Education: St Ignatius' College, Riverview

Sport
- Sport: Rowing

Bryan F Curtin (born 4 July 1949) is an Australian former representative rower. He competed in the men's eight event at the 1972 Summer Olympics and the 1975 World Rowing Championships.

== Club and state rowing ==
Curtin was educated at St Ignatius' College, Riverview in Sydney where he took up rowing. His senior club rowing was from the Sydney University Boat Club and Sydney Rowing Club.

At the Australian Rowing Championships in 1970 he contested the men's coxed pair title, placing second in Sydney University colours. At the 1974 Australian Championships he again placed second in that event rowing in Sydney Rowing Club colours.

Curtin first made state selection for New South Wales in the senior men's eight of 1971 contesting the King's Cup at the Interstate Regatta within the Australian Rowing Championships. The following year he stroked the New South Wales men's eight to a King's Cup and selection as the Australian eight to compete at the 1972 Munich Olympics.

Curtin then competed in New South Wales contesting the King's Cup in 1973 and 1974 rowing to another victory in 1974 from the four seat.

== International representative rowing ==
Following their victory in the 1972 King's Cup the New South Wales senior eight was selected stern through to bow as the Australian eight to represent at Munich. Before they departed five months later the two man Ian McWhirter had been diagnosed with liver cancer. Kerry Jelbart of Melbourne University Boat Club took McWhirter's place. The Australians finished fourth in their heat, won a repechage, finished fifth in the semi-final and eighth overall.

Curtin, his brother Richard, along with the coxswain, coach and five other members of the victorious 1974 NSW King's Cup crew were selected as the Australian men's eight to compete at the 1974 World Rowing Championships in Lucerne. The eight finished in 2nd place in the petite final for an overall eight placing.
