= Bredl =

Bredl is a German surname. Notable people with this surname include:

- Joshua Bredl (born 1991), real name of Bronson Matthews, American wrestler
- Michael Bredl (1915–1999), German musician and collector
- Peter Bredl (born 1951), Austrian rower
- Rob Bredl (born 1950), Australian documentary film-maker
