= Gracin =

Gracin is a surname. Notable people with the surname include:

- Josh Gracin (born 1980), American musician
- Zdravko Gracin (born 1951), Croatian rower

== See also ==
- Gracie (name)
