= Richard Curtin (rower) =

Australian rower

Personal information
- Nationality: Australian
- Born: 25 August 1951 (age 74)
- Education: St Ignatius' College, Riverview

Sport
- Sport: Rowing

Richard Curtin (born 25 August 1951) is an Australian former representative rower. He competed in the men's eight event at the 1972 Summer Olympics and at the 1974 World Rowing Championships.

== Club and state rowing ==
Curtin was educated at St Ignatius' College, Riverview in Sydney where he took up rowing. His senior club rowing was from the Sydney Rowing Club.

Curtin first made state selection for New South Wales in the senior men's eight of 1972 winning the King's Cup at the Interstate Regatta within the Australian Rowing Championships. That entire crew won selection as the Australian eight to compete at the 1972 Munich Olympics.

Curtin then competed in New South Wales contesting the King's Cup in 1973 and 1974, rowing to another victory in 1974 from the three seat.

At the 1974 Australian Rowing Championships, he contested the men's coxed pair title with his brother Bryan, placing second in Sydney Rowing Club colours. In 1975, he stroked a Sydney composite four which competed for both the coxed and coxless four titles 1975 Australian Championships

== International representative rowing ==
Following their victory in the 1972 King's Cup, the New South Wales senior eight was selected stern through to bow as the Australian eight to represent at Munich. Before they departed five months later the two man Ian McWhirter had been diagnosed with liver cancer. Kerry Jelbart of Melbourne University Boat Club took McWhirter's place. The Australians finished fourth in their heat, won a repechage, finished fifth in the semi-final and eighth overall.

Curtin, his brother Bryan, along with the coxswain, coach and five other members of the victorious 1974 NSW King's Cup crew were selected as the Australian men's eight to compete at the 1974 World Rowing Championships in Lucerne. The eight finished in 2nd place in the petite final for an overall eight placing. The following year, Donnelly was again in the stern of the Australian eight that finished in sixth place at the 1975 World Rowing Championships in Nottingham.
