= Galiazzo =

Galiazzo is an Italian surname. Notable people with the surname include:

- Chiara Galiazzo (born 1986), Italian singer
- Giuliano Galiazzo (born 1946), Italian rower
- Marco Galiazzo (born 1983), Italian archer
