= Mike Livingston (rower) =

American rower (born 1948)

Personal information
- Born: September 21, 1948 (age 77) Denver, Colorado, U.S.
Medal record
Men's rowing
Representing United States
Olympic Games
Silver medal – second place	1972 Munich	Eight

Michael Kent Livingston (born September 21, 1948) is an American rower who competed in the 1972 Summer Olympics.

He was born in Denver and is the younger brother of Cleve Livingston.

In 1972 he was a crew member of the American boat which won the silver medal in the eights event.

Livingston was the head coach of the University of California Men's Rowing team from 1981 through 1984.

He graduated from Harvard University.
