= Paul Hoffman (rowing) =

American rower (born 1946)

Personal information
- Born: April 21, 1946 (age 80) New York City, New York, U.S.
Medal record
Men's rowing
Representing the United States
Olympic Games
Silver medal – second place	1972 Munich	Eight
European Rowing Championships
Silver medal – second place	1967 Vichy	Eight

Paul Hoffman (born April 21, 1946) is an American coxswain who competed in the 1968 Summer Olympics and in the 1972 Summer Olympics.

He was born in New York City in 1946.

Hoffman was the cox for the men's eight at the 1967 European Rowing Championships where the team won silver. He was a member of the US Olympic Rowing Team at the 1968 Summer Olympics in Mexico City. A supporter of the Olympic Project for Human Rights (OPHR), Hoffman provided Peter Norman, the Australian winner of the silver medal of the 200m track race, with his OPHR badge, which Norman then wore at the medal ceremony in support of the protest by Tommie Smith and John Carlos. Hoffman then faced a disciplinary hearing by the U.S. Olympic Committee, where he was accused of conspiracy. He was found not guilty and was allowed to take part in the eights race. He was the coxswain of the American crew which finished sixth in the eight event.

Hoffman went on to take a silver medal at the 1972 Summer Olympics in Munich as the cox of the eight boat.

He graduated from Harvard College in 1968 and Harvard Law School in 1974.

== See also ==
- 1968 Olympics Black Power salute
