= Bill Hobbs (rower) =

American rower (1949–2020)

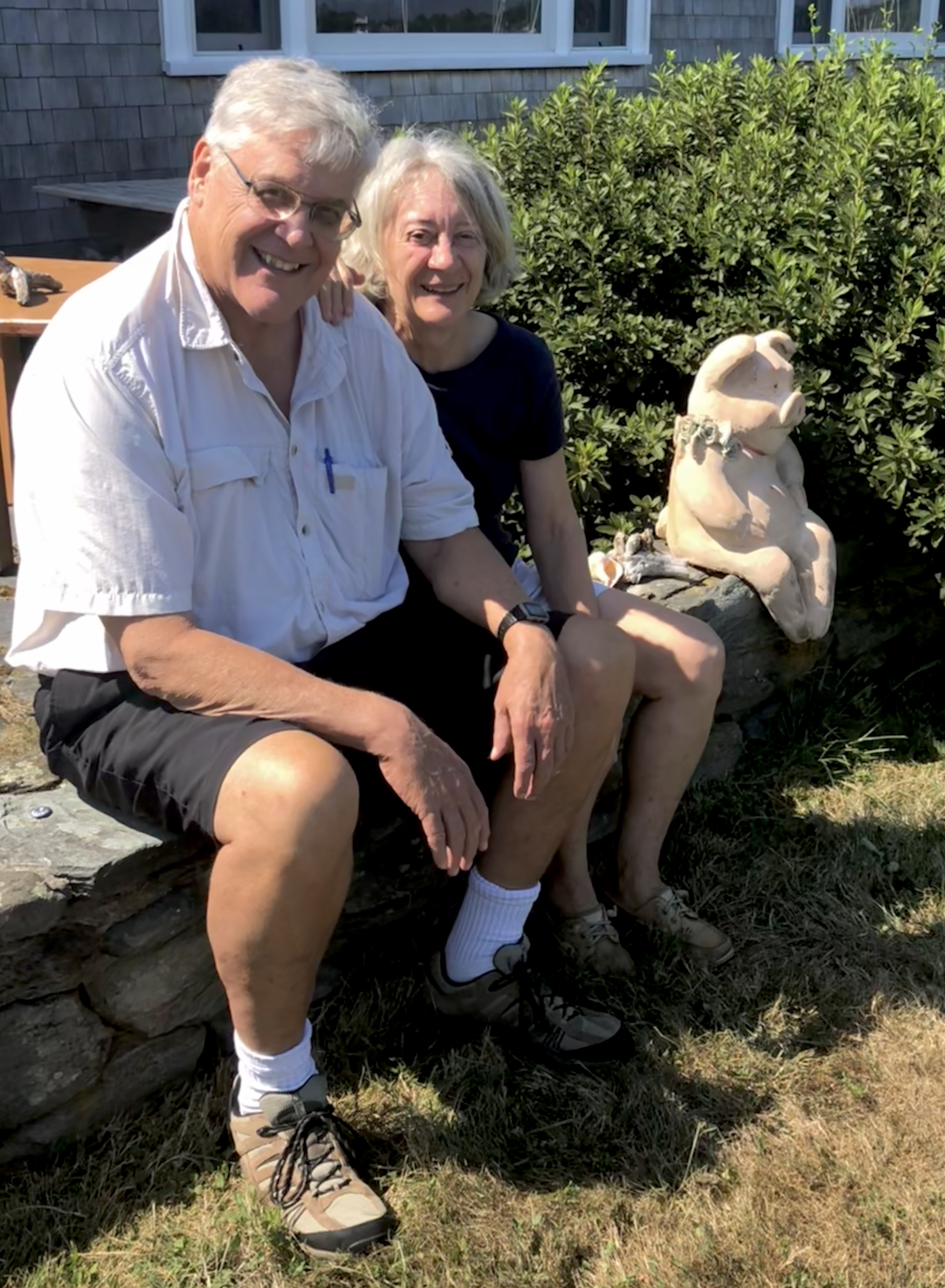
- Hobbs and his wife, Elizabeth in 2018

Personal information
- Full name: William Barton Roger Hobbs
- Nationality: American
- Born: July 30, 1949 Ponce, Puerto Rico
- Died: January 4, 2020 (aged 70) South Dartmouth, Massachusetts, U.S.
- Education: Milton Academy, Harvard University, Harvard Business School
- Spouse: Elizabeth K. Hobbs
Medal record
Men's rowing
Representing United States
Olympic Games
| Silver medal – second place | 1972 Munich | Eight |

William Barton Rogers Hobbs (July 30, 1949 – January 4, 2020) was an American rower who competed in the 1968 and 1972 Summer Olympics. He was born in Ponce, Puerto Rico and is the younger brother of Franklin Hobbs. In 1968 he stroked the American coxed pair which finished fifth in the Rowing at the 1968 Summer Olympics in Mexico. In 1970 he competed on the Dating Game for a date with Karen Carpenter. Two years later he rowed #3 in the American eight that won a silver medal in the 1972 Munich Olympics. He graduated from Harvard College and Harvard Business School.
