= Franklin Hobbs =

American rower (born 1947)

Personal information
- Full name: Franklin Warren Hobbs, IV
- Nickname: Fritz
- Born: July 30, 1947 (age 79) Manchester, New Hampshire, U.S.
Medal record
Men's rowing
Representing United States
Olympic Games
| Silver medal – second place | 1972 Munich | Eight |
European Rowing Championships
| Silver medal – second place | 1967 Vichy | Eight |

Franklin Warren "Fritz" Hobbs, IV (born July 30, 1947) is an American rower who competed in the 1968 Summer Olympics and in the 1972 Summer Olympics.

He was born in Manchester, New Hampshire and is the older brother of rower Bill Hobbs.

In 1968, he was a crew member of the American boat which finished sixth in the eight event. Four years later he won the silver medal with the American boat in the 1972 eights competition.

== Education and business career ==
Fritz Hobbs was educated at the Milton Academy (1965), Harvard College (1969) and the Harvard Business School (1972), after which he spent the next 25 years with the investment banking firm of Dillon Read & Co., the last five of which he was chief executive officer. When Dillon Read merged with SBC Warburg, and subsequently with Union Bank of Switzerland, Hobbs continued as chairman of the resulting UBS Warburg. He then moved to Houlihan Lokey as CEO. He has been a director of Molson Coors, Lord Abbett, Ally Financial, BAWAG, and other corporations, as well as serving on the Boards of Harvard University and Milton Academy.
