= Hel van het Noorden =

The Hel van het Noorden (Hell of the North) is a rowing race over the distance of 6 kilometres (3.7 mi). The Groninger Studenten Roeivereniging Aegir (Groningen Student Rowingclub Aegir) has organised the head race annually since 1975. As the race takes place in the last weekend of November the weather is often cold and stormy, hence the name 'Hell of the North'.

== History ==
Until 1988 the race took place on the Van Starkenborgh Canal. After the old boathouse 'De Punt' burned down, G.S.R. Aegir moved to a new location at the Winschoterdiep. This made a move to the Eems Canal necessary.

The race is traditionally rowed in the single scull or the coxless pair. Less popular are the coxed pair and the double scull. The Hel van het Noorden is nowadays an important moment to qualify for the Dutch national rowing team.
