= Gene Clapp =

American rower and Olympian (born 1949)

Personal information
- Full name: Eugene Howard Clapp III
- Born: November 19, 1949 (age 76) Brookline, Massachusetts, U.S.
- Education: University of Chicago University of Pennsylvania Brooks School
- Occupation: financial advisor
- Employer: Penobscot Investment Management Company
- Website: www.pimboston.com/GeneClapp

Sport
- Sport: Men's Eight
- College team: Crew, University of Pennsylvania

Achievements and titles
- World finals: 1971 World Championship, men's four
- National finals: 1971 American Henley Regatta champion
Medal record
Men's rowing
Representing the United States
Olympic Games
Silver medal – second place	1972 Munich	Men's eight

Eugene Howard Clapp III or Gene Clapp (born November 19, 1949) is an American rower and Olympian. He competed in the 1972 Summer Olympics, winning the silver medal in the men's eight event. He was inducted into the National Rowing Hall of Fame in 2012.

== Early life ==
Clapp was born in Brookline, Massachusetts and grew up in Wellesley Hills, Massachusetts. He is the son of Maud Millicent Greenwell and Eugene Howard Clapp Jr, a financial advisor. His younger brother is Charles Clapp who was also an Olympic rower.

When he was twelve-years-old, Clapp discovered rowing at summer camp. He attended the Brooks School in North Andover, Massachusetts where he participated in crew.

He attended the University of Pennsylvania, graduating with a B.A. in 1972. There, he was a member of St. Anthony Hall and the crew team, rowing in the 1967 Intercollegiate Championship. In 1972, he was captain of the Pennsylvania crew team and helped their men's eight team win the 1972 IRA championship.

He then attended the University of Chicago and received an MBA in 1974.

== Rowing ==
Clapp represented the United States at the 1971 World Championship, winning the title in men's eight. That same year, he rowed men's fours at the 1971 American Henley Regatta and won national title. During his training, he was affiliated with the Vesper Boat Club in Philadelphia, Pennsylvania.

Clapp represented the United States in the 1972 Summer Olympics in the men's eight. The team was assembled at the Olympic Camp and only participated in one race prior to the Olympic games. Their nickname was The Brothers and The Others because five of the eight-person team were from Harvard University. The team and Clapp won a silver medal with a photo finish; New Zealand won the gold medal. Clapp said, "No one could have beaten [the] New Zealand finish. They are a phenomenal crew, and we are happy with our silver medals."

Annually since their victory at the Olympics, the team has met and raced at the head of the Charles River under the name of Alte Achter Boat Club—German for Old Eight. The race is followed by a meal that is usually provided by Clapp. In 1997, their reunion included a rematch of the Gold medal team from New Zealand. After that race, the two teams went on a "grand tour."

On March 12, 2012, Clapp was also inducted into the National Rowing Hall of Fame for Men's Eight as part of the 1972 Olympic team.

== Career ==
After college, Clapp went into finance. In 1974, he worked for Loeb, Rhoades and Co. in New York City. Later, he worked for Pfizer. He co-founded and became the principal of Penobscot Investment Management Company, an investment management firm in Boston, Massachusetts. He is also president of the Pine Tree Land Company in Boston which is a branch of the firm by the same name in Delaware. In addition, he is a corporate member of the Partners in Healthcare System.

== Personal life ==
While at the University of Pennsylvania, he met his future wife, Meredith Ann Purdy, who was the daughter of Mr. and Mrs. John D. Purdy of Hinsdale, Illinois. They were married on July 20, 1974, at the Union Church in Hinsdale. They made their home in first New York City. They later lived in the Beacon Hill area of Boston, Massachusetts and had four children.

His has served on the board of King's Chapel, the Spaulding Rehabilitation Hospital, the Beacon Hill Civic Association, the National Rowing Foundation, and Partners Continuing Care. He also served as the chair of the Advent School Board and as board member and treasurer of the Conservation Law Foundation of New England.

In 2005, he and his wife were awarded the Beacon Award by the Beacon Hill Civic Association. In 2015, the couple received the Charles E. Rogerson Award for Community Service at the Rogerson Communities Welcome Home! Celebration.
