= Ryszard Giło =

Polish rower

Personal information
- Nationality: Polish
- Born: 23 September 1949 (age 75); Szczecin, Poland

Sport
- Sport: Rowing

Ryszard Giło (born 23 September 1949) is a Polish rower. He competed in the men's eight event at the 1972 Summer Olympics.
