= Wybo Veldman =

New Zealand rower

Personal information
- Born: Gerard Wybo Veldman; 21 October 1946 (age 80) Padang, Indonesia
Medal record
Men's rowing
Representing New Zealand
Olympic Games
Gold medal – first place	1972 Munich	Eight
World Rowing Championships
Bronze medal – third place	1970 St. Catharines	Eight
European Rowing Championships
Gold medal – first place	1971 Copenhagen	Eight
Silver medal – second place	1973 Moscow	Coxless pair

Gerard Wybo Veldman (born 21 October 1946), known as Wybo Veldman, is a former New Zealand rower. Born in Padang, Indonesia, of Dutch parents, he won an Olympic gold medal at the 1972 Summer Olympics in Munich. He teamed with Dick Joyce, Tony Hurt, John Hunter, Lindsay Wilson, Joe Earl, Trevor Coker and Gary Robertson and Simon Dickie (cox) to win the gold medal in the eights. Veldman had previously been in the crew of the eight that finished fourth at the 1968 Summer Olympics in Mexico City. Veldman won a then record 21 New Zealand national rowing titles.

Veldman was later a farmer in Ohakune.
