= Ladislav Heythum =

Czech rower

Personal information
- Nationality: Czech
- Born: 22 May 1950 (age 74); Prague, Czechoslovakia

Sport
- Sport: Rowing

Ladislav Heythum (born 22 May 1950) is a Czech rower. He competed in the men's eight event at the 1972 Summer Olympics.
