= Oscar de Dios =

Argentine rower (born 1948)

Personal information
- Nationality: Argentine
- Born: 21 August 1948 (age 77)

Sport
- Sport: Rowing

Oscar de Dios (born 21 August 1948) is an Argentine rower. He competed in the men's eight event at the 1972 Summer Olympics.
