= John Hunter (rower) =

New Zealand rower (born 1943)

Personal information
- Born: John Andrew Hunter; 8 November 1943 (age 83) Christchurch, New Zealand
- Height: 196 cm (6 ft 5 in)
- Weight: 96 kg (212 lb)

Sport
- Sport: Rowing
Medal record
Men's rowing
Representing New Zealand
Olympic Games
Gold medal – first place	1972 Munich	Eight
World Rowing Championships
Bronze medal – third place	1970 St. Catharines	Eight
European Rowing Championships
Gold medal – first place	1971 Copenhagen	Eight

John Andrew Hunter (born 8 November 1943) is a former New Zealand rower who won a gold Olympic medal in his career.

Hunter was born in 1943 in Christchurch, New Zealand. At the 1972 Summer Olympics in Munich he teamed with Dick Joyce, Wybo Veldman, Tony Hurt, Lindsay Wilson, Joe Earl, Trevor Coker and Gary Robertson and Simon Dickie (cox) to win the gold medal in the eights. Hunter had previously been a member of the eight which finished fourth at the 1968 Summer Olympics in Mexico City. He was also the Rowing Manager for the New Zealand team at the 1996 Summer Olympics in Atlanta.

Hunter was later an engineering consultant in Christchurch. He was employed by the New Zealand Ministry of Works and was involved in the expansion of Christchurch International Airport. As a rowing coach, he managed many teams including some of the teams at the 1996 Summer Olympics in Atlanta.
