= Maurizio Danielli =

Italian rower

Personal information
- Nationality: Italian
- Born: 23 May 1949; Santa Maria Rezzonico
- Died: 22 December 2016 (aged 67)

Sport
- Sport: Rowing

Maurizio Danielli (23 May 1949 – 22 December 2016) was an Italian rower. He competed in the men's eight event at the 1972 Summer Olympics. He died on 22 December 2016.
