= Cleve Livingston =

American rower (born 1947)

Personal information
- Born: May 24, 1947 (age 79) Los Angeles, California
Medal record
Men's rowing
Representing United States
Olympic Games
Silver medal – second place	1972 Munich	Eight

John Cleve Livingston (born May 24, 1947) is an American rower who competed in the 1968 Summer Olympics and in the 1972 Summer Olympics.

He was born in Los Angeles and is the older brother of Mike Livingston.

In 1968 he was a crew member of the American boat which finished sixth in the eight event.

Four years later he won the silver medal with the American boat in the 1972 eights competition.

He graduated from Harvard University.
