= Yves Oger =

French rower (1951–2019)

Personal information
- Nationality: French
- Born: 13 June 1951; Entrammes, France
- Died: 22 August 2019 (aged 68); Laval, France

Sport
- Sport: Rowing

Yves Oger (13 June 1951 – 22 August 2019) was a French rower. He competed in the men's eight event at the 1972 Summer Olympics.
