= Antal Gelley =

Hungarian rower

Personal information
- Nationality: Hungarian
- Born: 14 November 1950 Budapest, Hungary
- Died: 16 July 1981 (aged 30) Budapest, Hungary

Sport
- Sport: Rowing

Antal Gelley (14 November 1950 – 16 July 1981) was a Hungarian rower. He competed in the men's eight event at the 1972 Summer Olympics. After his Olympic career, he became an opera singer. Gelley died in an accident in his apartment building's stairwell in 1981.
