= Jan Młodzikowski =

Polish rower

Personal information
- Nationality: Polish
- Born: 7 May 1947 (age 77); Bydgoszcz, Poland

Sport
- Sport: Rowing

Jan Młodzikowski (born 7 May 1947) is a Polish rower. He competed in the men's eight event at the 1972 Summer Olympics.
