= Manfred Ruthner =

Austrian rower

Personal information
- Nationality: Austrian
- Born: 30 January 1952 (age 73)

Sport
- Sport: Rowing

Manfred Ruthner (born 30 January 1952) is an Austrian rower. He competed in the men's eight event at the 1972 Summer Olympics.
