= Martin Hinterleitner =

Austrian rower

Personal information
- Nationality: Austrian
- Born: 2 May 1951 (age 73)

Sport
- Sport: Rowing

Martin Hinterleitner (born 2 May 1951) is an Austrian rower. He competed in the men's eight event at the 1972 Summer Olympics.
