= Tony Hurt =

New Zealand rower

Personal information
- Born: Anthony John Hurt; 30 March 1946 (age 80) Auckland, New Zealand
- Height: 183 cm (6 ft 0 in)
- Weight: 82 kg (181 lb)

Sport
- Sport: Rowing
- Club: West End Rowing Club
Medal record
Men's rowing
Representing New Zealand
Olympic Games
Gold medal – first place	1972 Munich	Eight
Bronze medal – third place	1976 Montreal	Eight
World Rowing Championships
Bronze medal – third place	1974 Lucerne	Eight
European Rowing Championships
Gold medal – first place	1971 Copenhagen	Eight

Anthony John Hurt (born 30 March 1946) is a former New Zealand rower who won two Olympic medals. At the 1972 Summer Olympics in Munich, he teamed with Dick Joyce, Wybo Veldman, John Hunter, Lindsay Wilson, Joe Earl, Trevor Coker and Gary Robertson and Simon Dickie (cox) to win the gold medal in the eights. At the 1976 Summer Olympics in Montreal, he again crewed the eight which this time won the bronze medal. His crewmates this time were Alec McLean, Ivan Sutherland, Trevor Coker, Peter Dignan, Lindsay Wilson, Joe Earl and Dave Rodger and Simon Dickie (cox). In both Olympic races, he was the stroke.

Hurt later had a plumbing business in Auckland.
