= Zdeněk Zika =

Czech rower

Personal information
- Nationality: Czech
- Born: 5 July 1950; Třeboň, Czechoslovakia
- Died: 3 July 2014 (aged 63)

Sport
- Sport: Rowing

Zdeněk Zika (5 July 1950 – 3 July 2014) was a Czech rower. He competed in the men's eight event at the 1972 Summer Olympics.
