= Juan Carlos Estol =

Argentine rower

Juan Carlos Estol OLY
Personal information
- Born: 1 October 1952; Rosario, Santa Fe, Argentina
- Died: 21 December 2019 (aged 67); Rosario, Santa Fe, Argentina

Sport
- Country: Argentina
- Sport: Rowing
- Event: Olympic Games
- Club: Club de Regatas Rosario

Juan Carlos Estol (Rosario, Santa Fe, 1 October 1952 – Rosario, Santa Fe, 21 December 2019) was an Argentine rower. He competed in the men's eight event at the 1972 Summer Olympics.
