= Krzysztof Marek =

Polish rower

Personal information
- Nationality: Polish
- Born: 12 March 1949 (age 76); Gdańsk, Poland

Sport
- Sport: Rowing

Krzysztof Marek (born 12 March 1949) is a Polish rower. He competed in the men's eight event at the 1972 Summer Olympics.
