= Gérard Boyer =

French rower

Personal information
- Nationality: French
- Born: 12 August 1951 (age 73)

Sport
- Sport: Rowing

Gérard Boyer (born 12 August 1951) is a French rower. He competed in the men's eight event at the 1972 Summer Olympics.
