= Imre Dávid =

Hungarian rower

Personal information
- Nationality: Hungarian
- Born: 4 June 1944 (age 80); Budapest, Hungary

Sport
- Sport: Rowing

Imre Dávid (born 4 June 1944) is a Hungarian rower. He competed in the men's eight event at the 1972 Summer Olympics.
