= Dietmar Schwarz =

East German rowing cox

Personal information
- Born: 30 July 1947 (age 78) East Berlin
- Height: 172 cm (5 ft 8 in)
- Weight: 53 kg (117 lb)

Sport
- Sport: Rowing
- Club: SC Dynamo Berlin
Medal record
Men's rowing
Representing East Germany
Olympic Games
Bronze medal – third place	1972 Munich	Eight

Dietmar Schwarz (born 30 July 1947 in East Berlin) is a German coxswain who competed for the SC Dynamo Berlin / Sportvereinigung (SV) Dynamo. He won the medals at the international rowing competitions.
