= Dick Joyce (rower) =

New Zealand rower (born 1946)

Personal information
- Born: Richard John Joyce; 1 May 1946 (age 80) Wellington, New Zealand
- Height: 194 cm (6 ft 4 in)
- Weight: 89 kg (196 lb)

Sport
- Sport: Rowing
Medal record
Men's rowing
Representing New Zealand
Olympic Games
Gold medal – first place	1968 Mexico	Coxed four
Gold medal – first place	1972 Munich	Eight
World Rowing Championships
Bronze medal – third place	1970 St. Catharines	Eight
European Rowing Championships
Gold medal – first place	1971 Copenhagen	Eight

Richard John Joyce (born 1 May 1946) is a former New Zealand rower who won two Olympic gold medals during his career.

Joyce was born in 1946 in Wellington, New Zealand. For the 1968 Summer Olympics, New Zealand qualified an eight and had a pool of four rowers and a cox as a travelling reserve; Joyce was part of this reserve. Preparations were held in Christchurch at Kerr's Reach on the Avon River. The reserve rowers were unhappy with the "spare parts" tag and felt that they were good enough to perhaps win a medal if put forward as a coxed four. The manager, Rusty Robertson, commented about them that they were "the funniest looking crew you've ever seen". There were stern discussions with the New Zealand selectors. In a training run, the coxed four was leading the eight over the whole race. In the end, the reserve rowers got their way and New Zealand entered both the coxed four and the eight. Joyce won the Olympic coxed four event along with Dudley Storey, Ross Collinge, Warren Cole and Simon Dickie (cox); this was New Zealand's first gold medal in rowing. He was 22 and had just finished his mechanical engineering degree. The crew's boat was sold to a rowing club to recoup costs, and ended up in splinters after a road crash. At the 1972 Summer Olympics in Munich he teamed with Tony Hurt, Wybo Veldman, John Hunter, Lindsay Wilson, Joe Earl, Trevor Coker, Gary Robertson and Simon Dickie (cox) to win the eights.

Joyce is one of only fifteen New Zealanders to have won two or more Olympic gold medals. He later owned an engineering business in Seaview, an industrial suburb of Lower Hutt. He has always been associated with the Hutt Valley and belongs to the Hutt Valley club, but has moved and as of 2012 lived in Porirua. He is a life member of Wellington Rowing Club and currently coaches its masters squad.
