= Oldřich Kruták =

Czech rower

Personal information
- Nationality: Czech
- Born: 30 May 1947 (age 77); Břeclav, Czechoslovakia

Sport
- Sport: Rowing

Oldřich Kruták (born 30 May 1947) is a Czech rower. He competed in the men's eight event at the 1972 Summer Olympics.
