= Ricardo José Rodríguez =

Argentine rower

Personal information
- Nationality: Argentine
- Born: 4 January 1952 (age 73)

Sport
- Sport: Rowing

Ricardo José Rodríguez (born 4 January 1952) is an Argentine rower. He competed in the men's eight event at the 1972 Summer Olympics.
