= Marian Drażdżewski =

Polish rower

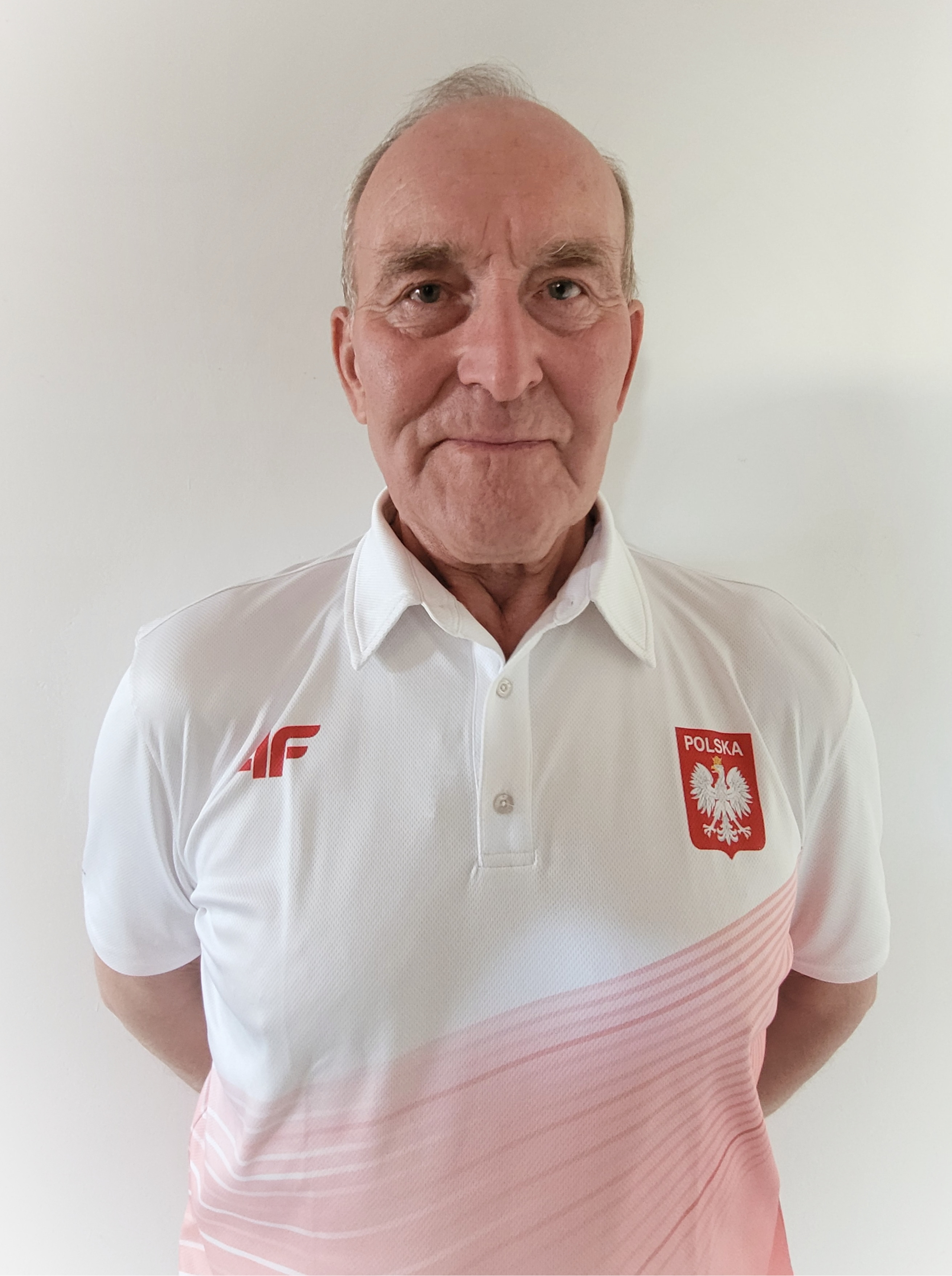
- Marian Drażdżewski

Personal information
- Nationality: Polish
- Born: 3 July 1946 (age 78); Bydgoszcz, Poland

Sport
- Sport: Rowing

Marian Drażdżewski (born 3 July 1946) is a Polish rower. He competed in the men's eight event at the 1972 Summer Olympics.
