= Peter Wetzstein =

Austrian coxswain

Personal information
- Nationality: Austrian
- Born: 12 January 1949 (age 76)

Sport
- Sport: Rowing

Peter Wetzstein (born 12 January 1949) is an Austrian rowing coxswain. He competed in the men's eight event at the 1972 Summer Olympics.
