= Milan Suchopár =

Czech rower (1952–1984)

Personal information
- Nationality: Czech
- Born: 3 June 1952 Mělník, Czechoslovakia
- Died: 1 December 1984 (aged 32) Prague, Czechoslovakia
- Height: 1.92 m (6 ft 4 in)

Sport
- Sport: Rowing

Milan Suchopár (3 June 1952 – 1 December 1984) was a Czech rower.

He competed for Czechoslovakia at the 1972 Summer Olympics, 1976 Summer Olympics and the 1980 Summer Olympics. In 1972 he finished tenth in the eights, in 1976 he finished fourth in the coxed fours, and in 1980 he finished ninth, again in the coxed fours.

In 1982, he transferred from the army sports club Dukla Prague to the civil club Slavia Prague. He got married, had a daughter, and, in addition to sports, began to earn money by working at heights. However, he died in an accident after an electrical injury, when he climbed a high-voltage pole, in Prague on 1 December 1984.

He was awarded the Bronze Order of the Town of Mělník posthumously in 2012.
