= Alec McLean =

New Zealand rower

Alec McLean QSO
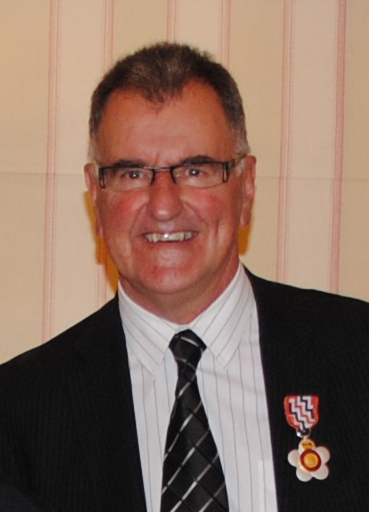
- McLean in 2010

Personal information
- Full name: Alexander Robert McLean
- Born: 18 October 1950 (age 75) Wellington, New Zealand
Medal record
Men's rowing
Representing New Zealand
Olympic Games
Bronze medal – third place	1976 Montreal	Eight
World Rowing Championships
Bronze medal – third place	1974 Lucerne	Eight
Bronze medal – third place	1975 Nottingham	Eight

Alexander Robert McLean QSO (born 18 October 1950) is a former New Zealand rower who won an Olympic bronze medal in the men's rowing eight at the 1976 Summer Olympics.

== Early life and family ==
Born in Wellington, New Zealand, on 18 October 1950, McLean was educated at Onslow College. In 1975, he married Denise Holmwood, and the couple had three children. He remarried Dinah Jane Okeby in 1990, and they had at least two more children.

== Rowing career ==
At the 1976 Summer Olympics in Montreal he crewed the men's rowing eight along with Tony Hurt, Ivan Sutherland, Trevor Coker, Peter Dignan, Lindsay Wilson, Joe Earl and Dave Rodger and Simon Dickie (cox). They came third, winning the bronze medal.

He was a member of New Zealand rowing eight between 1974 and 1976. He won a bronze medal at the 1974 World Rowing Championships in Lucerne, Switzerland. He was again a bronze medallist at the 1975 World Rowing Championships in Nottingham, England.

== Career as a public servant ==
McLean worked for the New Zealand Customs Department from 1968 until 1978, before becoming a parliamentary private secretary. Until 2008 he served two prime ministers, Robert Muldoon (1979–1981) and Helen Clark (1999–2008), and ministers including Ministers of Customs Peter Wilkinson (1978) and Hugh Templeton (1979), Ministers of Social Welfare Venn Young (1984), Ann Hercus (1984–1987), and Michael Cullen (1989), Minister of Finance Roger Douglas (1984–1987), Minister of Health Helen Clark (1990), and deputy prime minister Don McKinnon (1990–1993). McLean then served as deputy official secretary to the Governor-General of New Zealand from 2009 to 2012. From March 2012 McLean returned to parliament as private secretary to David Shearer, Leader of the Opposition.

From October 2014 to May 2015, McLean worked as property manager at Caniwi Capital Partners, in Wellington.

In June 2015, he again returned to parliament as executive assistant to David Shearer, MP for Mount Albert. After Shearer's departure from Parliament in December 2016 to take up a position with the United Nations, McLean became executive assistant to the new Mt Roskill MP, Michael Wood, Revenue spokesperson for the Labour opposition. In October 2017, Mclean took up the interim position as senior private secretary to Grant Robertson, Minister of Finance in the new Labour-led Government. McLean retired in December 2017.

== Honours and awards ==
McLean was appointed a Companion of the Queen's Service Order for public services in the New Zealand 2010 New Year Honours. He was also awarded the New Zealand 1990 Commemoration Medal.
