= Francesco Pigozzo =

Italian rower

Personal information
- Nationality: Italian
- Born: 30 June 1950 (age 74)

Sport
- Sport: Rowing

Francesco Pigozzo (born 30 June 1950) is an Italian rower. He competed in the men's eight event at the 1972 Summer Olympics.
