= Héctor Biassini =

Argentine rower

Personal information
- Nationality: Argentine
- Born: 4 October 1951 (age 73)

Sport
- Sport: Rowing

Héctor Biassini (born 4 October 1951) is an Argentine rower. He competed in the men's eight event at the 1972 Summer Olympics.
