= Gary Robertson (rower) =

New Zealand rower

Personal information
- Full name: Gary David Robertson
- Born: 12 April 1950 (age 76) Oamaru, New Zealand
- Relatives: Eric Murray (son-in-law); Rusty Robertson (uncle); George Paterson (brother-in-law)
Medal record
Men's rowing
Representing New Zealand
Olympic Games
Gold medal – first place	1972 Munich	Eight
World Rowing Championships
Bronze medal – third place	1970 St. Catharines	Eight
European Rowing Championships
Gold medal – first place	1971 Copenhagen	Eight

Gary David Robertson (born 12 April 1950 in Oamaru, Otago) is a former New Zealand rower who won an Olympic gold medal at the 1972 Summer Olympics in Munich.

He teamed with Dick Joyce, Wybo Veldman, John Hunter, Lindsay Wilson, Joe Earl, Trevor Coker and Tony Hurt and Simon Dickie (cox) to win the gold medal in the eight. Robertson is one of only two New Zealand Olympic gold medallists who never won a national premier title. Robertson is the nephew of famed New Zealand rowing coach Rusty Robertson. His daughter, who is also a rower, married Olympic champion rower Eric Murray. The Robertsons lived in Australia for a while but returned to live in Cambridge, New Zealand when their daughter was pregnant.

Gary Robertson later worked as a full-time rowing coach in Christchurch. He now coaches at Waikato Diocesan School for Girls, previously Sydney Rowing Club.
