= Hans-Ulrich Buchholz =

German rower

Personal information
- Nationality: German
- Born: 1 November 1944; Rendsburg, Germany
- Died: 9 August 2011 (aged 66)

Sport
- Sport: Rowing

Hans-Ulrich Buchholz (1 November 1944 – 9 August 2011) was a German rower. He competed in the men's eight event at the 1972 Summer Olympics.
