= Jacques Filippini =

French rower

Personal information
- Nationality: French
- Born: 4 February 1950 (age 75)

Sport
- Sport: Rowing

Jacques Filippini (born 4 February 1950) is a French rower. He competed in the men's eight event at the 1972 Summer Olympics.
