= Simon Dickie =

New Zealand rowing cox

Personal information
- Born: Simon Charles Dickie; 31 March 1951 Waverley, Taranaki, New Zealand
- Died: 13 December 2017 (aged 66) Taupō, New Zealand
- Education: Wanganui Collegiate School
- Height: 172 cm (5 ft 8 in)
- Weight: 54 kg (119 lb)

Sport
- Sport: Rowing
- Club: Wellington Rowing Club
Medal record
Men's rowing
Representing New Zealand
Olympic Games
Gold medal – first place	1968 Mexico	Coxed four
Gold medal – first place	1972 Munich	Eight
Bronze medal – third place	1976 Montreal	Eight
World Rowing Championships
Bronze medal – third place	1970 St. Catharines	Eight
European Rowing Championships
Gold medal – first place	1971 Copenhagen	Eight

Simon Charles Dickie (31 March 1951 – 13 December 2017) was a New Zealand rowing cox who won three Olympic medals.

Dickie was born in 1951 in Waverley in Taranaki, New Zealand. He was educated at Wanganui Collegiate School where he was part of the Maadi Cup winning crews between 1966 and 1968. For the 1968 Summer Olympics, New Zealand qualified an eight and had a pool of four rowers and a cox as a travelling reserve; Dickie was part of this reserve as their cox. Preparations were held in Christchurch at Kerr's Reach on the Avon River. The reserve rowers were unhappy with the "spare parts" tag and felt that they were good enough to perhaps win a medal if put forward as a coxed four. The trainer, Rusty Robertson, commented about them that they were "the funniest looking crew you've ever seen". There were stern discussions with the New Zealand selectors. In a training run, the coxed four was leading fours formed from the eight over the whole race. In the end, the reserve rowers got their way and New Zealand entered both the coxed four and the eight. Dickie won the Olympic coxed four event along with Dick Joyce, Dudley Storey, Ross Collinge and Warren Cole; this was New Zealand's first gold medal in rowing. At the time, he was a 17-year-old schoolboy at Wanganui Collegiate, called in to replace a previous cox who had been killed in a training accident. The crew's winning boat was later sold to a rowing club to recoup costs, and ended up in splinters after a road crash.

Dickie was part of the eight that was formed for the 1971 rowing season; he teamed up with Dick Joyce, Tony Hurt, Wybo Veldman, John Hunter, Lindsay Wilson, Joe Earl, Trevor Coker and Gary Robertson. They won gold at the 1971 European Rowing Championships, defeating the favourite team from East Germany. The New Zealand eight would go on in unchanged composition to with the 1972 Olympic eight event where they again won gold. At the 1976 Summer Olympics in Montreal he was again cox for the eight which this time won the bronze medal. His crewmates this time were Tony Hurt, Alec McLean, Ivan Sutherland, Trevor Coker, Peter Dignan, Lindsay Wilson, Joe Earl and Dave Rodger.

Dickie is one of only fifteen New Zealanders to have won two or more Olympic gold medals. He later owned an adventure company in Taupō.

== Death ==
He died at his house in Taupō on 13 December 2017 aged 66. The day before his death he had held a reunion for the 1968 coxed four, and he was involved in organising a reunion for the 1972 eight at the next Halberg Awards function.
