= Giuseppe Noal =

Italian rower

Personal information
- Nationality: Italian
- Born: 2 September 1950 (age 74)

Sport
- Sport: Rowing

Giuseppe Noal (born 2 September 1950) is an Italian rower. He competed in the men's eight event at the 1972 Summer Olympics.
