= Heinrich Mederow =

East German rower

Personal information
- Born: 20 September 1945 (age 81) Königs Wusterhausen, Soviet occupation zone in Germany
- Height: 186 cm (6 ft 1 in)
- Weight: 84 kg (185 lb)

Sport
- Sport: Rowing
Medal record
Men's rowing
Representing East Germany
Olympic Games
Bronze medal – third place	1972 München	Eight
European Rowing Championships
Gold medal – first place	1973 Moscow	Eight

Heinrich Mederow (born 20 September 1945) is a German rower, who competed for the SC Dynamo Berlin / Sportvereinigung (SV) Dynamo. He won medals at international rowing competitions.

Mederow was born in 1945 in Königs Wusterhausen, Brandenburg, Germany. He stands 186 cm tall and weighs 84 kg.
