= Peter Preiß =

Austrian rower

Personal information
- Nationality: Austrian
- Born: 27 April 1952 (age 72)

Sport
- Sport: Rowing

Peter Preiß (born 27 April 1952) is an Austrian rower. He competed in the men's eight event at the 1972 Summer Olympics.
