= Mladen Ninić =

Croatian rower

Personal information
- Nationality: Croatian
- Born: 8 July 1950 (age 74); Karanac, Yugoslavia

Sport
- Sport: Rowing

Mladen Ninić (born 8 July 1950) is a Croatian rower. He competed in the men's eight event at the 1972 Summer Olympics.
