= Günter Petersmann =

German rower

Personal information
- Nationality: German
- Born: 21 April 1941; Dortmund, Germany
- Died: 24 June 2024 (aged 83)

Sport
- Sport: Rowing

Günter Petersmann (21 April 1941 – 24 June 2024) was a German rower. He competed in the men's eight event at the 1972 Summer Olympics.
