= Norbert Hlobil =

Austrian rower

Personal information
- Nationality: Austrian
- Born: 13 June 1947 (age 77)

Sport
- Sport: Rowing

Norbert Hlobil (born 13 June 1947) is an Austrian rower. He competed in the men's eight event at the 1972 Summer Olympics.
