= Pete Raymond =

American former rower

Personal information
- Full name: Peter Harlow Raymond
- Born: January 21, 1947 (age 79) Princeton, New Jersey, U.S.
Medal record
Men's rowing
Representing United States
Olympic Games
Silver medal – second place	1972 Munich	eight

Peter Harlow Raymond (born January 21, 1947) is a beekeeper, and an American former rower who competed in the 1968 Summer Olympics and in the 1972 Summer Olympics. He was born in Princeton, New Jersey and attended South Kent School and Princeton University.

In 1968, he was stroke of the American boat which finished fifth in the coxless four event. Four years later, he rowed #6 in the silver medal American eight in the 1972 eights competition. From 1974 to 1985 he served as editor of The U. S. Rowing Association's magazineThe Oarsman which became the Rowing U.S.A. He was First Violin with the C.R.A.S.H.-B Marching Chamber Orchestra 1982–86. He is a writer and English teacher at Noble and Greenough school.

== See also ==
- List of Princeton University Olympians
