= Serafino Carminati =

Italian rower

Personal information
- Nationality: Italian
- Born: 8 July 1948 (age 76)

Sport
- Sport: Rowing

Serafino Carminati (born 8 July 1948) is an Italian rower. He competed in the men's eight event at the 1972 Summer Olympics.
