= Romano Bajlo =

Croatian rower

Personal information
- Nationality: Croatian
- Born: 16 March 1946 Zadar, Croatia
- Died: 23 November 2023 (aged 77) Zadar, Croatia

Sport
- Sport: Rowing

Romano Bajlo (16 March 1946 – 23 November 2023) was a Croatian rower. He competed in the men's eight event at the 1972 Summer Olympics.
