= Franz Nitsche =

Austrian rower

Personal information
- Nationality: Austrian
- Born: 23 March 1951 (age 74)

Sport
- Sport: Rowing

Franz Nitsche (born 23 March 1951) is an Austrian rower. He competed in the men's eight event at the 1972 Summer Olympics.
