= Lawrence Terry =

American rower (born 1946)

Personal information
- Born: April 12, 1946 (age 80) Concord, Massachusetts, U.S.
Medal record
Men's rowing
Representing United States
Olympic Games
Silver medal – second place	1972 Munich	Eight

Lawrence ("Monk") Terry Jr. (born April 12, 1946) is an American rower who competed in the 1968 Summer Olympics and in the 1972 Summer Olympics, winning a silver medal in the 1972 men's eights event.

He was born in Concord, Massachusetts. His father, Lawrence Sr., was the headmaster of Concord's Middlesex School and a former rowing coach for the United States Olympic team. Terry graduated from Middlesex in 1964 and Harvard University in 1968.

At Harvard, Terry rowed stroke for the varsity lightweight crew before moving to the junior varsity heavyweight crew in his senior year. The Harvard Varsity Club later called him the best stroke in Harvard lightweight crew history.

In 1968 he was on the American boat which finished fifth in the coxless four event. Four years later he won the silver medal in the 1972 eight competition, rowing stroke as usual. That year, Harvard coach Harry Parker coached the national team, and six Harvard alumni (including the coxswain) were selected for the American eight.

In 2012, the members of the 1972 silver-medalist eight were collectively inducted into the National Rowing Hall of Fame.
