= Peter Dignan =

New Zealand rower

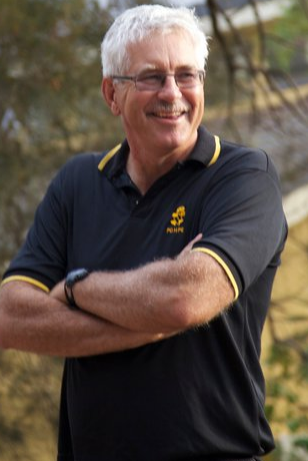
- Peter Dignan

Personal information
- Born: Peter Fraser Dignan; 6 March 1955 Gibraltar
- Died: 20 June 2013 (aged 58)
- Height: 191 cm (6 ft 3 in)
- Weight: 89 kg (196 lb)

Sport
- Sport: Rowing
Medal record
Representing New Zealand
Men's rowing
Bronze medal – third place	1976 Montreal	Eight
World Rowing Championships
Bronze medal – third place	1975 Nottingham	Eight

Peter Fraser Dignan (6 March 1955 – 20 June 2013) was a New Zealand rower.

== Biography ==
Dignan was born in Gibraltar in 1955, to a former Berlin airlift pilot. His father later entered the diplomatic corps and, as a result, Dignan spent a lot of time outside of his parents' native New Zealand. He subsequently relocated to Auckland, New Zealand, where he attended and boarded at King's College, becoming a house prefect.

He rowed with the men's eight in the 1975 World Rowing Championships in Nottingham, Great Britain, and won a bronze medal. Dignan represented New Zealand in the 1976 Montreal Olympic Games and won a bronze medal for his row in the Men's Eight along with Tony Hurt, Alec McLean, Ivan Sutherland, Trevor Coker, Lindsay Wilson, Joe Earl and Dave Rodger and Simon Dickie (cox). He subsequently participated in surf boat tests internationally, racing for New Zealand, including a 'rebel' tour to South Africa. He retired undefeated. Dignan also played rugby. Dignan's son Matthew is also a representative rower, and is in the Australian Under-19 coxed four.

Dignan served as a modern history teacher in Sydney, Australia at Sydney Grammar School. He was also a senior coach at the Sydney Grammar School boatshed and the School Year 10 Second Eight. In previous years he had much success with younger crews, coaching three different Year 10 second eights to victory at Head of the River, including the 2004 and the 2008 Year 10 second eights. Dignan also acted as the commanding officer of the 306 Squadron Australian Air Force Cadets from 1999 to 2005. Dignan died of pancreatic cancer on 20 June 2013 at the age of 58, with his last place of residence at Drummoyne.

== See also ==
- List of Gibraltarians
