= Hartmut Schreiber =

German rower (born 1944)

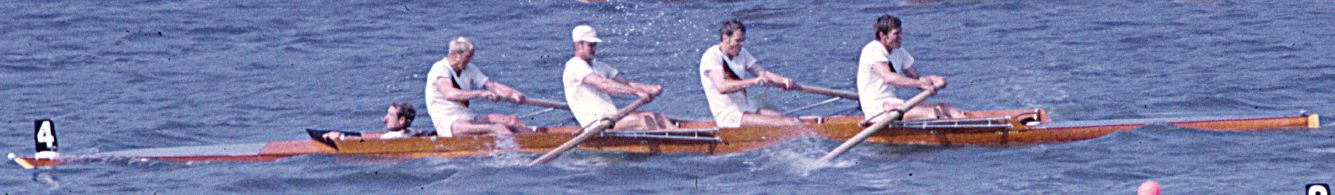
- At the 1971 European Rowing Championships, with Schreiber in seat 3

Personal information
- Born: 28 January 1944 (age 82)

Sport
- Sport: Rowing
Medal record
Men's rowing
Representing East Germany
Olympic Games
Bronze medal – third place	1972 München	Eight
World Rowing Championships
Silver medal – second place	1970 St. Catharines	Coxed pairs
European Rowing Championships
Silver medal – second place	1971 Copenhagen	Coxed four

Hartmut Schreiber (born 28 January 1944 in Wittich) is a German rower, who competed for the SC Dynamo Berlin / Sportvereinigung (SV) Dynamo. He won several medals at international rowing competitions.
