= Renzo Bulgarello =

Italian rower (1948–2020)

Personal information
- Nationality: Italian
- Born: 31 March 1948
- Died: 8 June 2020 (aged 72)

Sport
- Sport: Rowing

Renzo Bulgarello (31 March 1948 – 8 June 2020) was an Italian rower. He competed in the men's eight event at the 1972 Summer Olympics.
