= Béla Zsitnik Jr. =

Hungarian rower

Personal information
- Nationality: Hungarian
- Born: 7 November 1951 (age 73); Budapest, Hungary

Sport
- Sport: Rowing

Béla Zsitnik Jr. (born 7 November 1951) is a Hungarian rower. He competed in the men's eight event at the 1972 Summer Olympics.
