= Viktor Mikheyev =

Soviet coxswain (born 1942)

Mikheyev Viktor Ivanovich
Personal information
- Born: 19 April 1942 (age 84) Tashkent, Uzbek SSR, Soviet Union
- Height: 164 cm (5 ft 5 in)
- Weight: 52 kg (115 lb)

Sport
- Sport: Rowing
- Club: CSK VMF
Medal record
Men's rowing
Representing the Soviet Union
World Rowing Championships
Silver medal – second place	1966 Bled	Eight
Silver medal – second place	1970 St. Catharines	Eight
European Rowing Championships
Silver medal – second place	1965 Duisburg	Eight
Silver medal – second place	1967 Vichy	Eight
Bronze medal – third place	1971 Copenhagen	Eight

Viktor Mikheyev (Russian: Виктор Михеев; born 19 April 1942) is a Soviet coxswain from Moscow.

Mikheyev was born in Tashkent, Uzbek SSR. At the 1965 European Rowing Championships in Duisburg, he won silver with the men's eight. At the 1966 World Rowing Championships in Bled, he won silver with the men's eight. At the 1967 European Rowing Championships in Vichy, he won silver with the men's eight. He competed at the 1968 Summer Olympics in Mexico City with the men's coxed four where they came sixth. At the 1970 World Rowing Championships in St. Catharines, he won a silver medal with the men's eight. At the 1971 European Rowing Championships in Copenhagen, he won bronze with the men's eight. At the 1972 Summer Olympics in Munich, he came fourth with the men's eight. Winner of the Henley Royal Regatta in the men's eight in 1972. 7-time champion of the USSR in rowing. Master of Sports of the USSR of international class.
