= Joe Earl =

New Zealand rower

Personal information
- Born: Athol John Earl; 1 October 1952 (age 74) Christchurch, New Zealand
- Height: 196 cm (6 ft 5 in)
- Weight: 95 kg (209 lb)

Sport
- Country: New Zealand
- Sport: Rowing
- Club: Avon Rowing Club
Medal record
Men's rowing
Representing New Zealand
Olympic Games
Gold medal – first place	1972 Munich	Eight
Bronze medal – third place	1976 Montreal	Eight
World Rowing Championships
Bronze medal – third place	1974 Lucerne	Eight
Bronze medal – third place	1975 Nottingham	Eight
European Rowing Championships
Gold medal – first place	1971 Copenhagen	Eight

Athol John "Joe" Earl (born 1 October 1952) is a former New Zealand rower who won two Olympic medals.

Earl was born in 1952 in Christchurch and grew up on a farm in Hawarden in North Canterbury. He received his education at St. Andrew's College, where he started rowing under Fred Strachan. As Strachan was one of the national rowing selectors, Earl was picked ahead of more experienced oarsmen (according to his own statement) for the New Zealand eight that was to contest the 1971 European Rowing Championships. The eight won gold, to the surprise of everybody, at the regatta in Copenhagen. At the 1972 Summer Olympics in Munich he teamed with Dick Joyce, Wybo Veldman, John Hunter, Lindsay Wilson, Tony Hurt, Trevor Coker and Gary Robertson and Simon Dickie (cox) to win the gold medal in the eights. He rowed with the men's eight in the 1975 World Rowing Championships in Nottingham, Great Britain, and won a bronze medal. At the 1976 Summer Olympics in Montreal he again crewed the eight which this time won the bronze medal. His crewmates this time were Alec McLean, Ivan Sutherland, Trevor Coker, Peter Dignan, Lindsay Wilson, Tony Hurt and Dave Rodger and Simon Dickie (cox).

Earl's father died on his way to Munich. Whilst doctors had advised against travel due to a weak heart, his parents went nonetheless and his father died when they were in Italy. Earl still went ahead with the competition, and Strachan remarked later that "he still performed". The funeral had to wait until the rowers had returned to New Zealand. Joe Earl took over his father's farm until 1992. Afterwards, he was farming at Blackball on the West Coast. He then went into real estate and was at first branch manager in Rangiora. Since about 2009, he has sold real estate from Christchurch for PGG Wrightson.
