= Yves Rebelle =

French rowing cox

Personal information
- Nationality: French
- Born: 5 March 1952 (age 73)

Sport
- Sport: Rowing

Yves Rebelle (born 5 March 1952) is a French rowing coxswain. He competed in the men's eight event at the 1972 Summer Olympics.
