= Sławomir Maciejowski =

Polish rower

Personal information
- Nationality: Polish
- Born: 16 January 1951; Płock, Poland
- Died: 4 January 2023 (aged 71)

Sport
- Sport: Rowing

Sławomir Maciejowski (16 January 1951 – 4 January 2023) was a Polish rower. He competed in the men's eight event at the 1972 Summer Olympics.

Maciejowski died on 4 January 2023, at the age of 71.
