= Ladislav Lorenc =

Czech rower

Personal information
- Nationality: Czech
- Born: 10 August 1946 (age 78); Prague, Czechoslovakia

Sport
- Sport: Rowing

Ladislav Lorenc (born 10 August 1946) is a Czech rower. He competed in the men's eight event at the 1972 Summer Olympics.
