= Josip Bajlo =

Croatian rower

Personal information
- Nationality: Croatian
- Born: 13 March 1944 (age 81); Zadar, Yugoslavia

Sport
- Sport: Rowing

Josip Bajlo (born 13 March 1944) is a Croatian rower. He competed in the men's eight event at the 1972 Summer Olympics.
