= Lindsay Wilson (rower) =

New Zealand rower

Personal information
- Born: Lindsay Edward Wilson; 15 October 1948 (age 78) Methven, New Zealand

Sport
- Sport: Rowing
Medal record
Men's rowing
Representing New Zealand
Olympic Games
Gold medal – first place	1972 Munich	Eight
Bronze medal – third place	1976 Montreal	Eight
World Rowing Championships
Bronze medal – third place	1974 Lucerne	Eight
Bronze medal – third place	1975 Nottingham	Eight
European Rowing Championships
Gold medal – first place	1971 Copenhagen	Eight

Lindsay Edward "Lew" Wilson (born 15 October 1948) is a former New Zealand rower who won two Olympic medals.

Wilson was born in Methven, New Zealand in 1948. At the 1972 Summer Olympics in Munich, he teamed with Dick Joyce, Wybo Veldman, John Hunter, Tony Hurt, Joe Earl, Trevor Coker and Gary Robertson and Simon Dickie (cox) to win the gold medal in the eights. He rowed with the men's eight in the 1975 World Rowing Championships in Nottingham, Great Britain, and won a bronze medal. At the 1976 Summer Olympics in Montreal, he again crewed the eight which this time won the bronze medal. His crewmates this time were Alec McLean, Ivan Sutherland, Trevor Coker, Peter Dignan, Tony Hurt, Joe Earl and Dave Rodger and Simon Dickie (cox).

Wilson was later a public servant in Hamilton working in Maori Affairs.
