= Trevor Coker =

New Zealand rower

Personal information
- Full name: Trevor Ian Coker
- Born: 1 October 1949 Whanganui, New Zealand
- Died: 23 August 1981 (aged 31)
- Height: 192 cm (6 ft 4 in)
- Weight: 87 kg (192 lb)

Sport
- Sport: Rowing
- Club: Wanganui Rowing Club; Avon
Medal record
Men's rowing
Representing New Zealand
Olympic Games
Gold medal – first place	1972 Munich	Eight
Bronze medal – third place	1976 Montreal	Eight
World Rowing Championships
Bronze medal – third place	1974 Lucerne	Eight
Bronze medal – third place	1975 Nottingham	Eight
European Rowing Championships
Gold medal – first place	1971 Copenhagen	Eight

Trevor Ian Coker (1 October 1949 – 23 August 1981) was a New Zealand rower who won two Olympic medals. He was born in Whanganui, New Zealand. Coker won the European Championship in 1971. Known then as the "New Zealand Eight", Coker and his team received Halberg Awards in 1971 and 1972 as New Zealand Sportsman of the Year (the rules were altered in 1971 to allow a team to receive this recognition).

Coker was born in Wanganui in 1949. He initially rowed for the Wanganui Rowing Club.

At the 1972 Summer Olympics in Munich, he teamed with Dick Joyce, Wybo Veldman, John Hunter, Lindsay Wilson, Joe Earl, Tony Hurt and Gary Robertson and Simon Dickie (cox) to win the gold medal in the eights. At the 1976 Summer Olympics in Montreal, he again crewed the eight, which this time won the Bronze medal. His crew mates this time were Alec McLean, Ivan Sutherland, Hurt, Peter Dignan, Wilson, Earl and Dave Rodger.

Coker won the New Zealand national championships in the four in 1974, 1975 and 1976, and with the eight in 1976. He won a bronze medal at the World Championships in 1974, and rowed with the eight in the 1975 World Rowing Championships in Nottingham, Great Britain, winning a bronze medal.

Coker died of a brain tumor in 1981. His teammates stayed close to his wife and son, assisting with financial support. Trevor and the 1972 Gold medal team were inducted into the New Zealand Sports Hall of Fame in 1990. In 1997, the 1972 team travelled back to the course at Munich to mark the 25th anniversary. Coker was the only member not present.

New Zealand secondary school rowing teams compete today for the Coker Memorial Shield.
