= Philippe Cabut =

French rower

Personal information
- Nationality: French
- Born: 19 September 1947 (age 77)

Sport
- Sport: Rowing

Philippe Cabut (born 19 September 1947) is a French rower. He competed in the men's eight event at the 1972 Summer Olympics.
