= Reinhard Zahn =

German coxswain

Medal record

Men's rowing

Representing East Germany

World Rowing Championships
Gold medal – first place	1970 St. Catharines	Eight

European Rowing Championships
Silver medal – second place	1971 Copenhagen	Eight

Reinhard Zahn is a German coxswain who competed for the SC Dynamo Berlin / Sportvereinigung (SV) Dynamo. He won medals at the international rowing competitions.
