= Róbert Örlschléger =

Hungarian rowing cox

Personal information
- Nationality: Hungarian
- Born: 1 October 1956 (age 68); Budapest, Hungary

Sport
- Sport: Rowing

Róbert Örlschléger (born 1 October 1956) is a Hungarian rowing coxswain. He competed in the men's eight event at the 1972 Summer Olympics.
