= Manfred Schmorde =

German rower (born 1946)

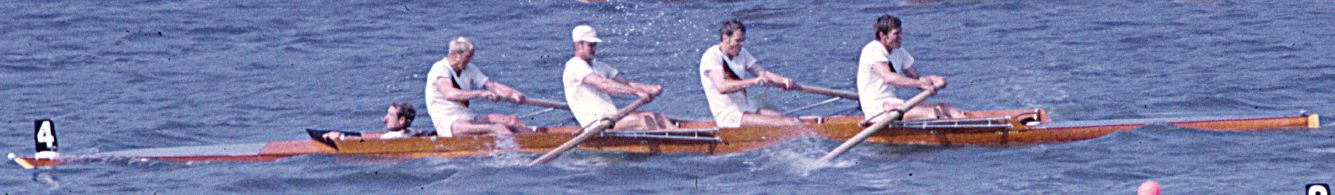
- At the 1971 European Rowing Championships, with Schmorde as stroke

Personal information
- Born: 18 September 1946 (age 79) Großsteinberg

Sport
- Sport: Rowing
Medal record
Men's rowing
Representing East Germany
Olympic Games
Bronze medal – third place	1972 Munich	Eight
World Rowing Championships
Silver medal – second place	1970 St. Catharines	Coxed pair
European Rowing Championships
Silver medal – second place	1971 Copenhagen	Coxed four

Manfred Schmorde (born 18 September 1946 in Großsteinberg, Saxony) is a German rower. He competed for the SC Dynamo Berlin / Sportvereinigung (SV) Dynamo and won medals at international rowing competitions.
