= Jadran Radovčić =

Croatian rower

Personal information
- Nationality: Croatian
- Born: 25 February 1959 (age 66); Šibenik, Yugoslavia

Sport
- Sport: Rowing

Jadran Radovčić (born 25 February 1959) is a Croatian rower. He competed in the men's eight event at the 1972 Summer Olympics.
