= Kerry Jelbart =

Australian rower (born 1944)

Personal information
- Nationality: Australian
- Born: 10 March 1944 (age 81)

Sport
- Sport: Rowing

Kerry Peter Jelbart (born 10 March 1944) is an Australian former representative rower. He competed in the men's eight event at the 1972 Summer Olympics and twice at World Rowing Championships.

== Club, varsity and state rowing ==
Jelbart was educated at Scotch College, Melbourne where he took up rowing. His senior rowing was from the Australian National University Boat Club, the Melbourne University Boat Club and later Monash University.

He was a founding member of the Australian National University Boat Club when rowing commenced at that institution in 1964. He was the ANU's inaugural sculling representative at the 1966 Intervarsity Championships and raced again in that event at the 1967 Australian Intervarsity Championships placing second to Sydney University's Dick Reddel.

Jelbart made a move to the Melbourne University Boat Club in 1967. He raced in their colours at the 1968 Australian Rowing Championships contesting the coxless pair national title. He rowed in MUBC coxed fours contesting national title events at the Australian Rowing Championships in 1970, 1974, 1976 and 1977; coxless fours in 1970 and 1978; and in a Victorian eight in 1970 which contested an open men's eight title.

Jelbart first made state selection for Victoria in the senior men's eight of 1968 contesting the King's Cup at the Interstate Regatta within the Australian Rowing Championships. He rowed in ten Victorian King's Cup eights from 1968 to 1978 (excluding 1974) and was victorious in 1968, 1970 and 1971 (at stroke).

== International representative rowing ==
Australian representation first came for Jelbart in 1970 when the stern four plus Jelbart and the coxswain of the winning Victorian Kings Cup eight were selected as the nucleus of the Australian eight to race at the 1970 World Rowing Championships in St. Catharines Canada. That crew made the A final and finished in fifth place.

In 1972 the victorious King's Cup New South Wales senior eight was selected stern through to bow as the Australian eight to represent at Munich. Before they departed five months later the two-man Ian McWhirter had been diagnosed with liver cancer. Jelbart replaced McWhirter and moved to Sydney for the lead up training. The Australians finished fourth in their heat, won a repechage, finished fifth in the semi-final and eighth overall.

In 1978 Jelbart made another Australian representative appearance when he raced in a coxed pair at the 1978 World Rowing Championships with Bill Dankbaar and Brent Parsons. They finished in overall ninth place.
