= Giuliano Rossi =

Italian rower

Personal information
- Nationality: Italian
- Born: 28 July 1951 (age 73)

Sport
- Sport: Rowing

Giuliano Rossi (born 28 July 1951) is an Italian rower. He competed in the men's eight event at the 1972 Summer Olympics.
