= Ágoston Bányai =

Hungarian rower

Personal information
- Nationality: Hungarian
- Born: 24 August 1950 (age 74); Budapest, Hungary

Sport
- Sport: Rowing

Ágoston Bányai (born 24 August 1950) is a Hungarian rower. He competed in the men's eight event at the 1972 Summer Olympics.
