= Boris Vorobyov =

Soviet rower (1949–2019)

Personal information
- Born: 8 October 1949
- Died: 17 July 2019 (aged 69)

Sport
- Sport: Rowing
Medal record
Men's rowing
Representing the Soviet Union
European Championships
Bronze medal – third place	1973 Moscow	Eight

Boris Vorobyov (Russian: Борис Воробьëв; 8 October 1949 – 17 July 2019) was a Soviet rower. He competed at the 1972 Summer Olympics in Munich with the men's eight where they came fourth.
