= Winfried Ringwald =

German rower

Personal information
- Nationality: German
- Born: 12 December 1950 (age 74); Dittigheim, Germany

Sport
- Sport: Rowing

Winfried Ringwald (born 12 December 1950) is a German rower. He competed at the 1972 Summer Olympics and the 1976 Summer Olympics.
