= Hans Huisinga =

Dutch rower (born 1950)

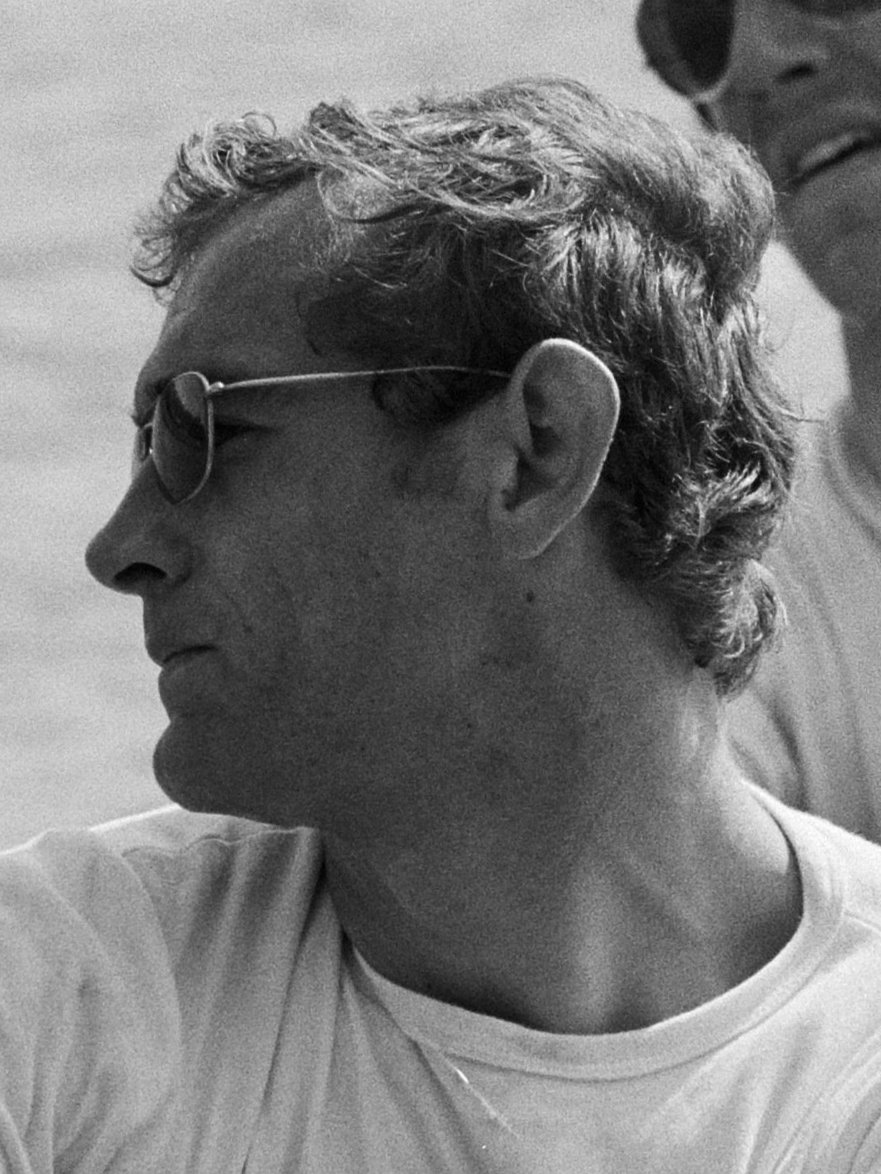
- Hans Huisinga in 1974

Personal information
- Born: 12 May 1950 (age 76) Hilversum, the Netherlands
- Height: 1.86 m (6 ft 1 in)
- Weight: 91 kg (201 lb)

Sport
- Sport: Rowing
- Club: Aegir, Groningen

Johannes Wilhelmus Huisinga (born 12 May 1950) is a retired Dutch rower. He competed at the 1972 Summer Olympics in the men's eight and finished in ninth place.
