= Giuliano Galiazzo =

Italian rower

Personal information
- Nationality: Italian
- Born: 29 April 1946 (age 78)

Sport
- Sport: Rowing

Giuliano Galiazzo (born 29 April 1946) is an Italian rower. He competed in the men's eight event at the 1972 Summer Olympics.
