= Peter Bredl =

Austrian rower

Personal information
- Nationality: Austrian
- Born: 20 April 1951 (age 73)

Sport
- Sport: Rowing

Peter Bredl (born 20 April 1951) is an Austrian rower. He competed in the men's eight event at the 1972 Summer Olympics.
