= Raúl Mazerati =

Argentine coxswain (1957–2026)

Personal information
- Nationality: Argentine
- Born: 17 October 1957 (age 68)

Sport
- Sport: Rowing

Raúl Mazerati (17 October 1957 – 27 April 2026) was an Argentine rowing coxswain. He competed in two events at the 1972 Summer Olympics.
