= Sergey Kolyaskin =

Soviet rower

Personal information
- Born: 10 February 1949 (age 77)
- Height: 190 cm (6 ft 3 in)
- Weight: 86 kg (190 lb)

Sport
- Sport: Rowing
Medal record
Men's rowing
Representing the Soviet Union
European Championships
Bronze medal – third place	1973 Moscow	Eight

Sergey Viktorovich Kolyaskin (Russian: Сергей Викторович Коляскин; born 10 February 1949) is a Soviet rower. He competed at the 1972 Summer Olympics in Munich with the men's eight where they came fourth.
