= Alfredo Martín (rower) =

Argentine rower

Personal information
- Full name: Alfredo Antonio Martín
- Nationality: Argentine
- Born: 12 April 1948 (age 77)

Sport
- Sport: Rowing

Alfredo Antonio Martín (born 12 April 1948) is an Argentine rower. He competed in the men's eight event at the 1972 Summer Olympics.
