= Norbert Kindlmann =

German rower (1944–2023)

Personal information
- Nationality: German
- Born: 30 June 1944; Wiesbaden, Germany
- Died: 21 December 2023 (aged 79)

Sport
- Sport: Rowing

Norbert Kindlmann (30 June 1944 – 21 December 2023) was a German rower. He competed in the men's eight event at the 1972 Summer Olympics. Kindlmann died on 21 December 2023, at the age of 79.
