= Aleksandr Ryazankin =

Soviet rower

Personal information
- Born: 21 July 1949 (age 76)
- Height: 190 cm (6 ft 3 in)
- Weight: 91 kg (201 lb)

Sport
- Sport: Rowing
Medal record
Men's rowing
Representing the Soviet Union
World Championships
Silver medal – second place	1970 St. Catharines	Eight
European Championships
Bronze medal – third place	1973 Moscow	Eight

Aleksandr Ryazankin (Russian: Александр Рязанкин; born 21 July 1949) is a Soviet rower.

Ryazankin was born in 1949. At the 1970 World Rowing Championships in St. Catharines, he won silver with the men's eight. He competed at the 1972 Summer Olympics in Munich with the men's eight where they came fourth. At the 1973 European Rowing Championships in Moscow, he was with the men's eight that won bronze.
