= Dimos Kokas =

Greek footballer

Personal information
- Date of birth: 24 June 1997 (age 29)
- Place of birth: Patras, Greece
- Height: 1.74 m (5 ft 9 in)
- Position: Midfielder

Team information
- Current team: Panachaiki
- Number: 25

Youth career
- 2008–2015: Davourlis K. '92
- 2015–2016: PAS Giannina

Senior career*
Years	Team	Apps	(Gls)
2016–2018	Olympiacos Volos	34	(15)
2018–2019	Digenis Oroklinis	0	(0)
2019–2020	Nafpaktiakos Asteras	10	(4)
2020–	Panachaiki	15	(1)
- * Club domestic league appearances and goals as of 18 May 2021

Dimos Kokas (Greek: Δήμος Κόκας; born 24 June 1997) is a Greek professional footballer who plays as a midfielder for Super League 2 club Panachaiki.

== Personal life ==
Kokas’ twin brother, Andreas, is also a professional footballer.
