= Péter Kokas =

Hungarian rower

Personal information
- Nationality: Hungarian
- Born: 16 April 1946 (age 78); Bischofshofen, Austria

Sport
- Sport: Rowing

Péter Kokas (born 16 April 1946) is a Hungarian rower. He competed in the men's eight event at the 1972 Summer Olympics.
