= Andreas Kokas =

Greek footballer

Personal information
- Date of birth: 24 June 1997 (age 29)
- Place of birth: Patras, Greece
- Height: 1.73 m (5 ft 8 in)
- Position: Left-back

Team information
- Current team: Olympiacos Volos
- Number: 19

Youth career
- 2008–2015: Davourlis K. '92
- 2015–2016: PAS Giannina

Senior career*
Years	Team	Apps	(Gls)
2016–2018	Olympiacos Volos	27	(3)
2018–2019	Nafpaktiakos Asteras	14	(0)
2019	Volos	6	(0)
2019–2020	PO Xylotymbou	10	(0)
2020–2021	Karaiskakis	10	(0)
2021–	Olympiacos Volos	6	(0)
- * Club domestic league appearances and goals as of 1 May 2022

Andreas Kokas (Greek: Ανδρέας Κόκας; born 24 June 1997) is a Greek professional footballer who plays as a left-back for Super League 2 club Olympiacos Volos.

== Personal life ==
Kokas’ twin brother, Dimos, is also a professional footballer.

== Honours ==
Volos

- Football League: 2018–19
