= Márk Bányai =

Hungarian water polo player (born 1999)

Personal information
- Full name: Márk Attila Bányai
- Nationality: Hungarian
- Born: 8 December 1999 (age 26) Oradea, Romania
- Height: 198 cm (6 ft 6 in)

Márk Attila Bányai (born 8 December 1999) is a Romanian-born Hungarian water polo player. He represented Hungary at the 2024 Summer Olympics. He has competed in water polo tournaments since 2016.
