= Jerzy Ulczyński =

Polish rower

Personal information
- Nationality: Polish
- Born: 27 July 1951 (age 73); Opole, Poland

Sport
- Sport: Rowing

Jerzy Ulczyński (born 27 July 1951) is a Polish rower. He competed at the 1972 Summer Olympics and the 1976 Summer Olympics.
