= Valery Bisarnov =

Soviet rower

Personal information
- Born: 26 June 1948 (age 76); Kolomna, Russian SFSR, Soviet Union
- Height: 182 cm (6 ft 0 in)
- Weight: 88 kg (194 lb)

Sport
- Sport: Rowing

Valery Igorevich Bisarnov (Russian: Валерий Игоревич Бисарнов; born 26 June 1948) is a Soviet rower from Russia. He competed at the 1972 Summer Olympics in Munich with the men's eight where they came fourth.
