= Nándor Bányai =

Hungarian footballer (1928–2003)

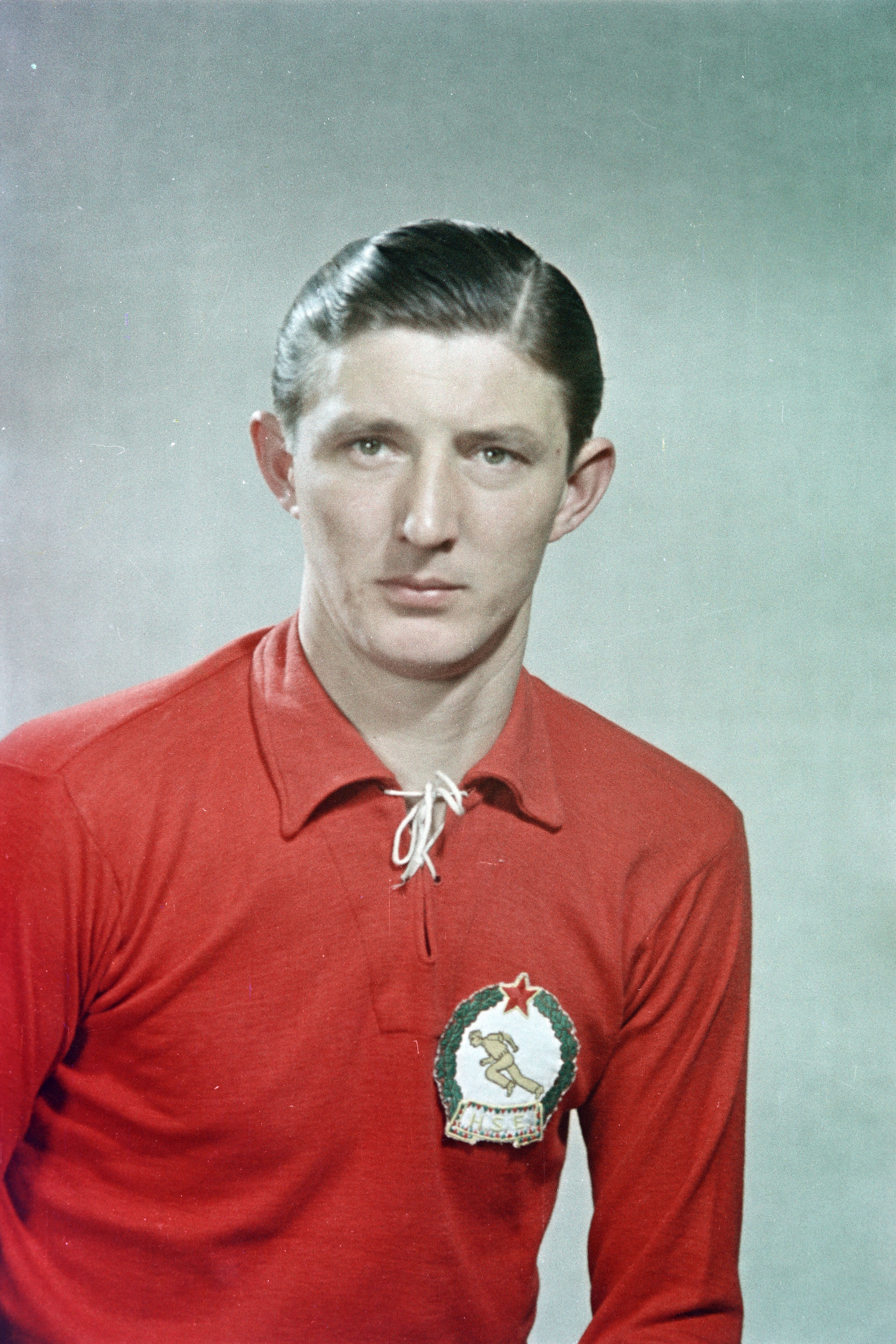

Personal information
- Date of birth: 8 March 1928
- Place of birth: Kispest, Hungary
- Date of death: 8 December 2003 (aged 75)
- Place of death: Budapest, Hungary
- Position: Left midfielder

Senior career*
Years	Team	Apps	(Gls)
1946–1960	Budapesti Honvéd	306	(7)

International career
1950	Hungary	2	(0)

Managerial career
- 1961–1963: Zalaegerszeg
- 1963: Budapesti Honvéd
- 1967: Debrecen
- 1973–1974: Zagłębie Sosnowiec
- * Club domestic league appearances and goals

Nándor Bányai (born as Breier; 8 March 1928 – 8 December 2003) was a Hungarian football player and manager.

== Playing career ==
Born in Kispest, Bányai played club football for hometown side Budapesti Honvéd. He also represented the Hungary national side, earned a total of two caps for the team in the spring of 1950. He had won five times the Hungarian national championships (1949–50, 1950-spring, 1952, 1954 and 1955)

== Coaching career ==
Bányai managed some of Hungarian clubs as well as Zalaegerszeg, Kecskemét, Leninváros (Tiszaújváros), Debrecen, Sopron, and also worked in Poland, Algeria and Togo.
