= Herman Eggink =

Dutch rower

Personal information
- Born: 3 August 1949 (age 76) Groningen, the Netherlands
- Height: 1.84 m (6 ft 0 in)
- Weight: 78 kg (172 lb)

Sport
- Sport: Rowing
- Club: Aegir, Groningen

Herman Johan Eggink (born 3 August 1949) is a retired Dutch rower. He competed at the 1972 Summer Olympics in the men's eight and finished in ninth place.
