= Zdravko Gracin =

Croatian rower

Personal information
- Nationality: Croatian
- Born: 19 November 1951 (age 73); Šibenik, Yugoslavia

Sport
- Sport: Rowing

Zdravko Gracin (born 19 November 1951) is a Croatian rower. He competed in the men's eight event at the 1972 Summer Olympics.
