= Bernd Truschinski =

German rower (1949–2008)

Personal information
- Nationality: German
- Born: 13 April 1949; Dortmund, Germany
- Died: 25 January 2008 (aged 58); Dortmund, Germany

Sport
- Sport: Rowing

Bernd Truschinski (13 April 1949 – 25 January 2008) was a German rower. He competed at the 1972 Summer Olympics and the 1976 Summer Olympics.
