= Aleksandr Shitov =

Soviet rower (born 1950)

Personal information
- Born: 7 November 1950 (age 75) Kolomna, Russian SFSR, Soviet Union
- Height: 193 cm (6 ft 4 in)
- Weight: 93 kg (205 lb)

Sport
- Sport: Rowing

Aleksandr Nikolayevich Shitov (Russian: Александр Николаевич Шитов; born 7 November 1950) is a Soviet rower from Russia. He competed at the 1972 Summer Olympics in Munich with the men's eight where they came fourth.
