= Alessandro Liberati =

- Born: 27 April 1954; Genoa, Italy
- Died: 1 January 2012 (aged 57); Bologna, Italy
- Education: University of Milan
- Occupation: Epidemiologist
- Spouse: Mariangela
- Children: Elisa and Valeria

Alessandro Liberati (Genoa, Italy, 27 April 1954 – Bologna, Italy, 1 January 2012) was an Italian healthcare researcher and clinical epidemiologist, and founder of the Italian Cochrane Centre.

== Biography ==
Alessandro Liberati graduated from the University of Milan in 1978 with a degree in medicine, and obtained a postgraduate degree in Hygiene and Preventive Medicine from the same university in 1982. Before his graduation, he started collaborating with the Mario Negri Institute for Pharmacological Research in Milan, where he led the laboratory of clinical epidemiology for a dozen years. He spent postgraduate research periods at the Harvard School of Public Health and at the RAND Corporation. He was an advocate of the evidence-based medicine movement and one of the founders of the Cochrane Collaboration, an international network of researchers established in 1993, producing a collection of systematic reviews of the medical literature, published in the Cochrane Library. In 1994 he started the Italian Cochrane Centre as the sixth Centre in the Cochrane Collaboration, which currently lists 31 centres and branches, and was its director for eighteen years.

In 1998 Liberati moved to academia, becoming associate professor of Medical Statistics at the University of Modena and Reggio Emilia. The following year he also became director of CeVEAS, a regional evidence-based centre located in Modena aimed at supporting clinicians' and health-care policymakers' decisions. In 2002 he started a Research and Innovation Program at the Emilia-Romagna Regional Health Care Agency, aimed at promoting patient-oriented clinical research bringing together clinicians, researchers, health care institutions, patients and the industry. Later in the same year Liberati was diagnosed with multiple myeloma. In 2003 he underwent two bone marrow transplants. He continued his work in patient-oriented research, as vice-president of Italy's National Committee for Health Research, and as a member of the Research and Development Committee of the Italian Drug Agency.

In late 2011 his clinical condition worsened until his death on 1 January 2012. In a press release, the Italian Minister of Health Renato Balduzzi described Liberati as one of the most insightful Italian researchers and a prominent member of the international scientific community.

== Career and international reputation ==
Several obituaries describe Liberati's professional experience, highlighting the main features of his work and the ideas he supported. He believed that within a health system, research should be an integral part of its mission, especially where lack of commercial interests prevents the possibility of private investment, and that researchers should concentrate on what is relevant to patients, not to their careers or to drug companies. Moreover, he strongly believed that developing alliances with consumers is necessary for setting research priorities, and that research results should be easily accessible to people who need to make decisions about their own health.

In keeping with Iain Chalmers, one of the founders of the Cochrane Collaboration, Liberati was one of the pioneers of evidence synthesis, specifically, analyzing controlled trials of treatments for early breast cancer and assessing the effects of antibiotic prophylaxis in patients in intensive care. Chalmers mentions that he was pleased that Liberati and his colleagues' centre created "the first challenge to 'anglophone imperialism' within the evolving Collaboration".

Liberati was on the editorial board of two international medical journals, the British Medical Journal and Annals of Internal Medicine. He was a member of groups of international researchers developing standards to improve the quality of reporting of medical evidence (such as PRISMA) and to grade recommendations within clinical guidelines for medical decision-making (such as GRADE). He was an author of 187 scientific publications in international peer-reviewed medical journals.

During 2003 and 2008, Liberati led with Zadig, a scientific publisher, specialized in EBM communication, a program to disseminate independent and unbiased information to all Italian doctors. He did so by translating Clinical Evidence, a compendium of the best available evidence on treating a wide range of common conditions, into Italian and distributing it freely, supported by the Italian Medicines Agency (AIFA). By 2008, six Italian editions were published, freely available to all 248,000 doctors in practice in Italy at that time. Again in collaboration with Zadig, to speed up the diffusion of EBM, Liberati launched a free-access continuous medical education e-learning system, based on Clinical Evidence, called ECCE (the Italian acronym for Continuing Education Clinical Evidence). At the end of 2008 almost 130,000 health professionals were using ECCE, considered contents relevant and appropriate for educational purposes and expressed their intention to apply the acquired information into clinical practice. This is considered a successful example of knowledge translation, making research findings more accessible and clinically relevant to increase their usefulness for practitioners and, ultimately, improve patient outcomes.

Liberati often used his own experience as a patient as evidence of the need for collaborative strategies in healthcare research, such as in an interview published by the World Health Organization and in medical journal articles. In his last months, Liberati kept a blog where he discussed and exchanged comments about his disease, health care and other themes.
