= Reinhard Wendemuth =

German rower

Personal information
- Nationality: German
- Born: 1 January 1948 (age 78) Braunschweig, Germany
- Height: 1.89 m (6 ft 2 1/2 in)
- Weight: 93 kg (205 lb)

Sport
- Sport: Rowing
- Club: Ruderclub Hansa von 1898
Medal record
Men's rowing
Representing West Germany
World Rowing Championships
Bronze medal – third place	1974 Lucerne	Coxless four

Reinhard Wendemuth (born 1 January 1948) is a former German rower who competed for West Germany in the 1972 and 1976 Summer Olympics.

Wendemuth also won the bronze medal in the coxless four event at the 1974 World Rowing Championships in Lucerne.
