= Viktor Dementyev =

Soviet rower

Personal information
- Birth name: Viktor Mikhaylovich Dementyev
- Born: 21 April 1945
- Died: 3 September 2018 (aged 73)
- Height: 192 cm (6 ft 4 in)
- Weight: 102 kg (225 lb)

Sport
- Sport: Rowing

Viktor Dementyev (Russian: Виктор Дементьев; 21 April 1945 – 3 September 2018) was a Soviet rower. He competed at the 1972 Summer Olympics in Munich with the men's eight where they came fourth.
