= Hans-Joachim Borzym =

East German rower

Olympic medal record

Representing East Germany

Men's rowing
Bronze medal – third place	1972 Munich	Eight

Hans-Joachim Borzym (born 7 January 1948 in Brandenburg an der Havel) is a German rower who competed in the early 1970s. He won a bronze medal in the eights event at the 1972 Summer Olympics in Munich.

Borzym competed for SG Dynamo Potsdam/Sportvereinigung (SV) Dynamo and won medals at national and international rowing competitions. His wife, Petra Grabowski, also won a silver medal in the women's K-2 500 m event at the same games.
