= Frank Mulder =

Dutch rower

Personal information
- Born: 5 August 1946 (age 79) Voorburg, the Netherlands
- Height: 1.87 m (6 ft 2 in)
- Weight: 84 kg (185 lb)

Sport
- Sport: Rowing
- Club: Aegir, Groningen

Frank Mulder (born 5 August 1946) is a retired Dutch rower. He competed at the 1972 Summer Olympics in the eight event and finished in ninth place.

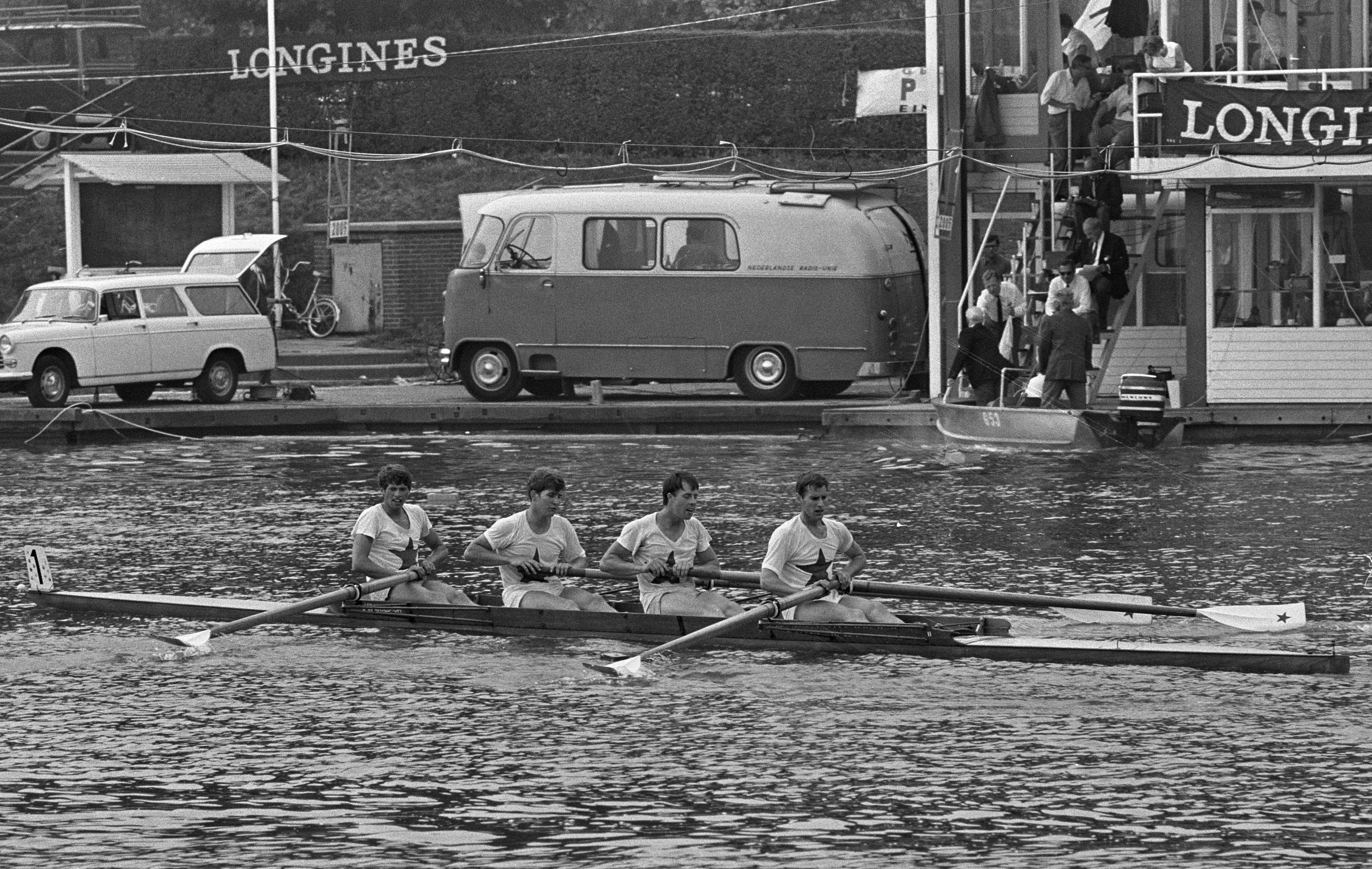
Frank Mulder (left) in 1969
