= Rutger Stuffken =

Dutch rower (1947–2023)

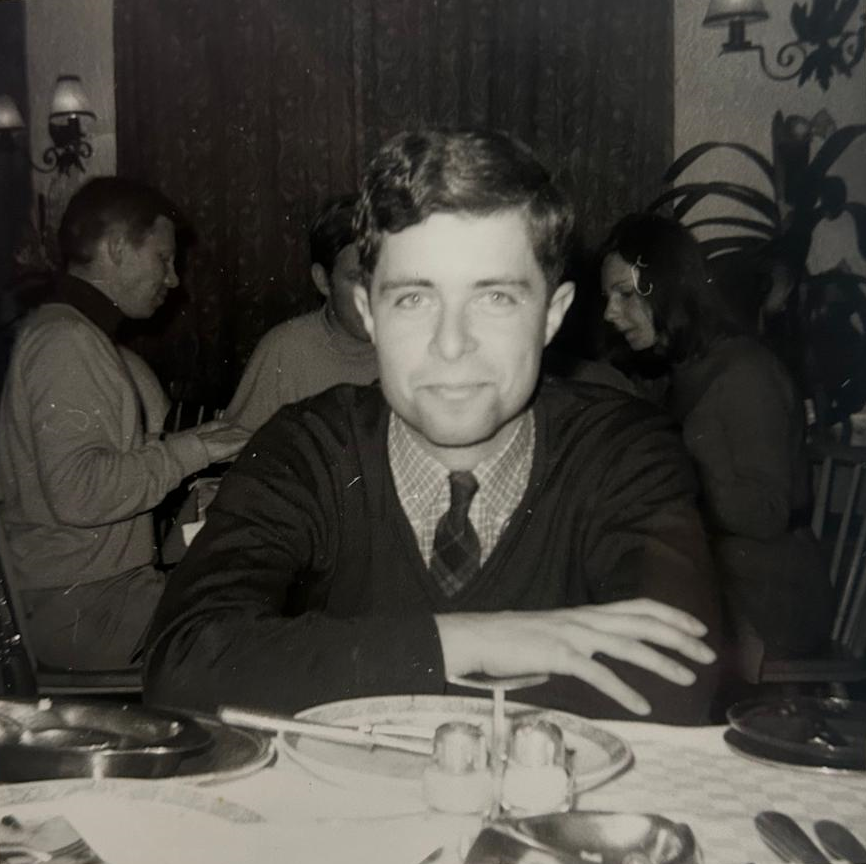

Personal information
- Born: 11 August 1947 Heerlen, Netherlands
- Died: 22 November 2023 (aged 76) Hilversum, Netherlands
- Height: 1.71 m (5 ft 7 in)
- Weight: 50 kg (110 lb)

Sport
- Sport: Rowing
- Club: Aegir, Groningen

Rutger Stuffken (11 August 1947 – 22 November 2023) was a Dutch coxswain. He competed at the 1972 Summer Olympics in the eight event and finished in ninth place.

Stuffken died in Hilversum on 22 November 2023, at the age of 76.
