= Jan van der Vliet =

Dutch rower

Personal information
- Born: 5 March 1949 (age 77) Heemstede, the Netherlands
- Height: 1.92 m (6 ft 4 in)
- Weight: 90 kg (200 lb)

Sport
- Sport: Rowing
- Club: Aegir, Groningen

Jan Johan van der Vliet (born 5 March 1949) is a retired Dutch rower. He competed at the 1972 Summer Olympics in the eight event and finished in ninth place. After retiring from competitions he first worked as an orthopedic surgeon, and later, in the 2000s, as a rowing coach at the Roosendaalse Roeivereniging.
