= Pieter Offens =

Dutch rower

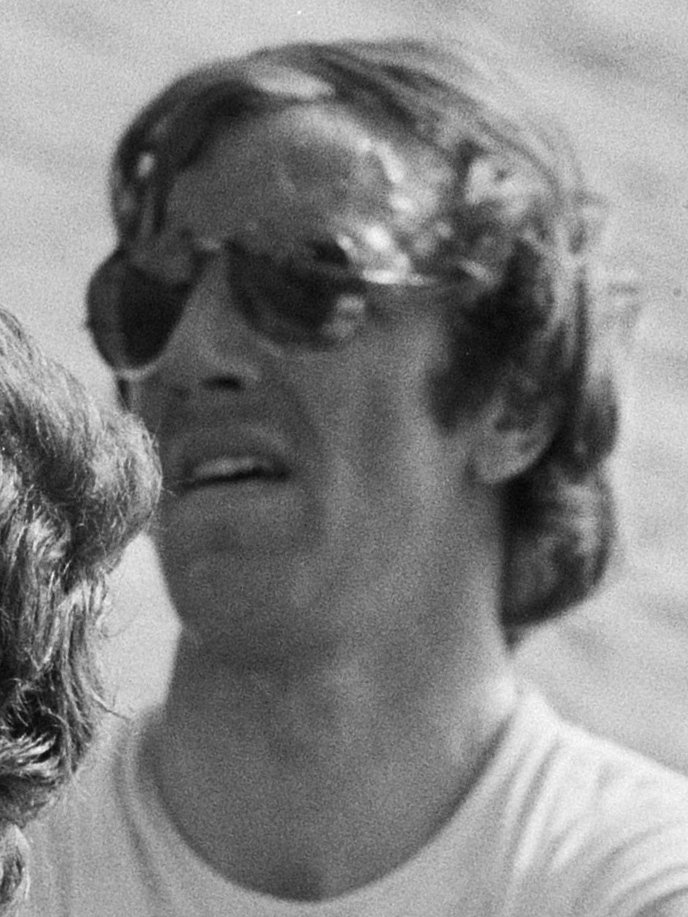
- Pieter Offens in 1974

Personal information
- Born: 28 October 1946 (age 79) Scheemda, the Netherlands
- Height: 1.94 m (6 ft 4 in)
- Weight: 86 kg (190 lb)

Sport
- Sport: Rowing
- Club: Aegir, Groningen

Pieter Hendrik Offens (born 28 October 1946) is a retired Dutch rower. He competed at the 1972 Summer Olympics in the eight event and finished in ninth place.
