= Henk Rouwé =

Dutch rower

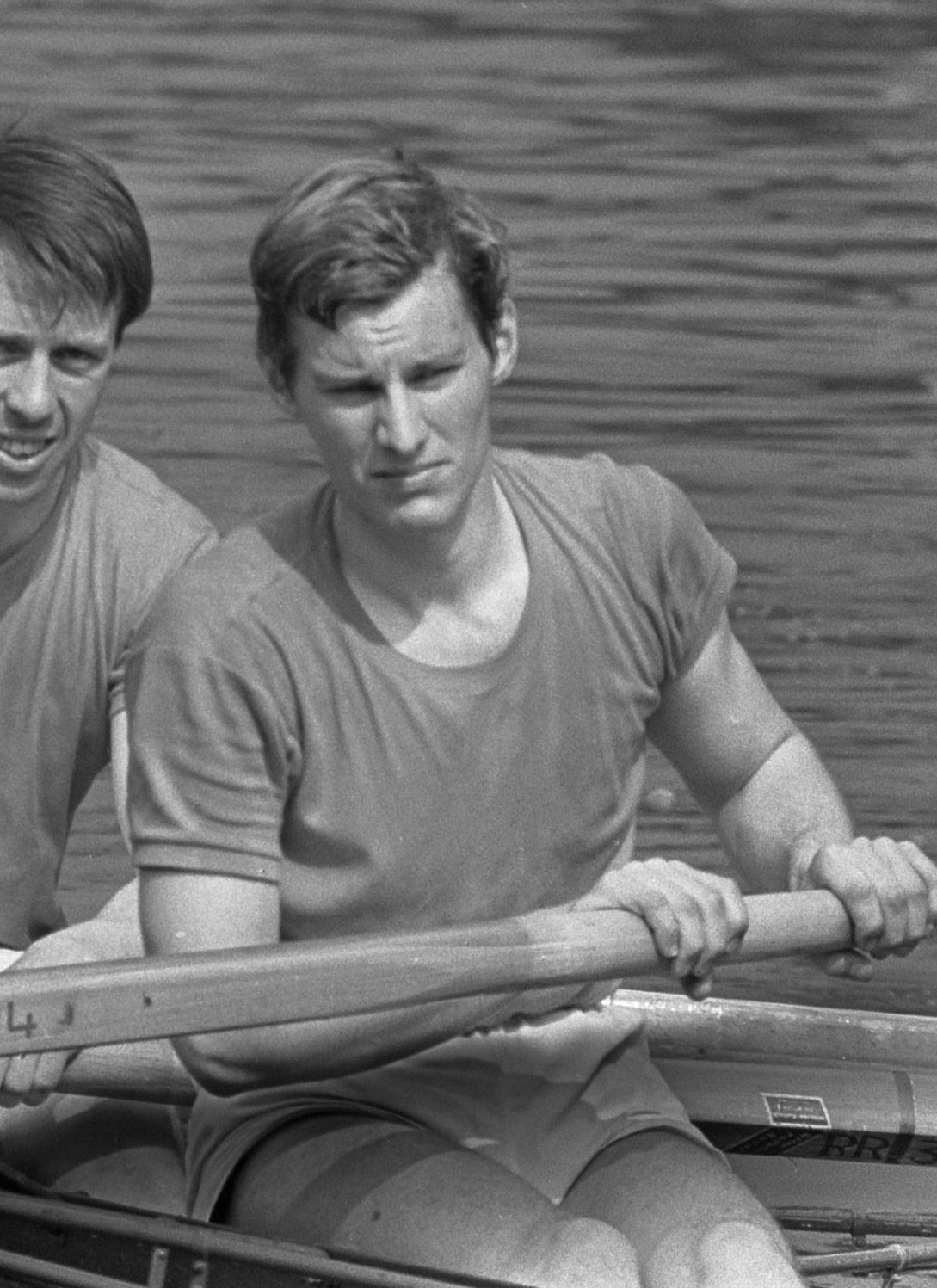
- Henk Rouwé in 1968

Personal information
- Born: 19 July 1946 (age 79) Grou, the Netherlands
- Height: 1.84 m (6 ft 0 in)
- Weight: 78 kg (172 lb)

Sport
- Sport: Rowing
- Club: Aegir, Groningen

Hendrik Wopke "Henk" Rouwé (born 19 July 1946) is a retired Dutch rower. He competed at the 1972 Summer Olympics in the eight event and finished in ninth place.

His elder brother Herman is also an Olympic rower.
