= 1970 World Rowing Championships =

International rowing event

- Venue: Royal Canadian Henley Rowing Course
- Location: St. Catharines, Ontario, Canada
- Dates: 3–6 September

The 1970 World Rowing Championships was the 3rd World Rowing Championships. It was held in 1970 at the Royal Canadian Henley Rowing Course in St. Catharines, Ontario, Canada. The competition involved seven events. Prior to the 4th World Rowing Championships in 1974, only men competed.

== Background ==
The International Rowing Federation (FISA) held a congress in conjunction with the 1967 European Rowing Championships in Vichy, France. At that congress, it was decided that the 1970 World Championships would be held outside of Europe, and that Canada was likely to be chosen as host.

== Medal summary ==
Medalists at the 1970 World Rowing Championships:

=== Men's events ===
Event	Gold		Silver		Bronze	
Event	Country & rowers	Time	Country & rowers	Time	Country & rowers	Time
M1x	Argentina; Alberto Demiddi	7:16.54	East Germany; Götz Draeger		Czechoslovakia; Jaroslav Hellebrand	
M2x	Denmark; Jørgen Engelbrecht; Niels Henry Secher	6:28.68	East Germany; Uli Schmied; Joachim Böhmer		United States; John Van Blom; Thomas McKibbon	
M2-	East Germany; Peter Gorny; Werner Klatt	6:57.81	Poland; Alfons Ślusarski; Jerzy Broniec		West Germany; Udo Brecht; Lutz Ulbricht	
M2+	Romania; Ștefan Tudor; Petre Ceapura; Ladislau Lovrenschi	7:25.30	East Germany; Hartmut Schreiber; Manfred Schmorde; Klaus-Dieter Ludwig		Soviet Union; Vladimir Eshinov; Nikolay Ivanov; Walentin Kostizin	
M4-	East Germany; Frank Forberger; Frank Rühle; Dieter Grahn; Dieter Schubert	6:23.15	West Germany; Joachim Ehrig; Peter Funnekötter; Claus Schneggenburger; Wolfgang Plottke		Denmark; Erik Petersen; Tom Hindsby; Kurt Helmudt; Poul Nielsen	
M4+	West Germany; Peter Berger; Hans-Johann Färber; Gerhard Auer; Alois Bierl; Stefan Voncken	6:28.55	East Germany; Bernd Meerbach; Rolf Zimmermann; Jochen Mietzner; Karl-Heinz Prudöhl; Karl-Heinz Danielowski		Norway; Alf Hansen; Finn Tveter; Tom Welo; Peter Waerness; Finn Aronsen	
M8+	East Germany; Ernst Otto Borchmann; Rolf Jobst; Dietrich Zander; Reinhard Gust; Eckhard Martens; Bernd Ahrendt; Klaus-Peter Foppke; Hans-Joachim Puls; Reinhard Zahn	5:36.1	Soviet Union; Nikolai Sumatoshin; Aleksandr Martyshkin; Aleksandr Ryazankin; Victor Melnikov; Benjaminas Nacevičius; Mindaugas Vaitkus; Victor Levchin; Aleksandr Visotski; Viktor Mikheyev		New Zealand; Warren Cole; Wybo Veldman; Murray Watkinson; John Hunter; Dick Joyce; Dudley Storey; Gary Robertson; Gil Cawood; Simon Dickie	

=== Event codes ===
	Single scull	Double scull	Coxless pair	Coxed pair	Coxless four	Coxed four	Eight
Men's	M1x	M2x	M2-	M2+	M4-	M4+	M8+

== Medal table ==
Country	(gold) Gold	(silver) Silver	(bronze) Bronze	Total
East Germany	3	4	0	7
West Germany	1	1	1	3
Denmark	1	0	1	2
Argentina	1	0	0	1
Romania	1	0	0	1
Soviet Union	0	1	1	2
Poland	0	1	0	1
Czechoslovakia	0	0	1	1
New Zealand	0	0	1	1
Norway	0	0	1	1
United States	0	0	1	1
Total	7	7	7	21

== Finals ==
Event	1st	2nd	3rd	4th	5th	6th	7th
M1x	Argentina	East Germany	Czechoslovakia	Soviet Union	West Germany	Italy	
M2x	Denmark	East Germany	United States	Netherlands	Switzerland	Soviet Union	
M2-	East Germany	Poland	West Germany	Soviet Union	Switzerland	Netherlands	
M2+	Romania	East Germany	Soviet Union	Italy	West Germany	Czechoslovakia	
M4-	East Germany	West Germany	Denmark	Netherlands	Switzerland	Soviet Union	
M4+	West Germany	East Germany	Norway	New Zealand	Argentina	Soviet Union	
M8+	East Germany	Soviet Union	New Zealand	West Germany	Australia+	Poland	Hungary

+ 7 boat final following protest in semi finals from Australia
