= Bram Tuinzing =

Dutch rower (1948–2024)

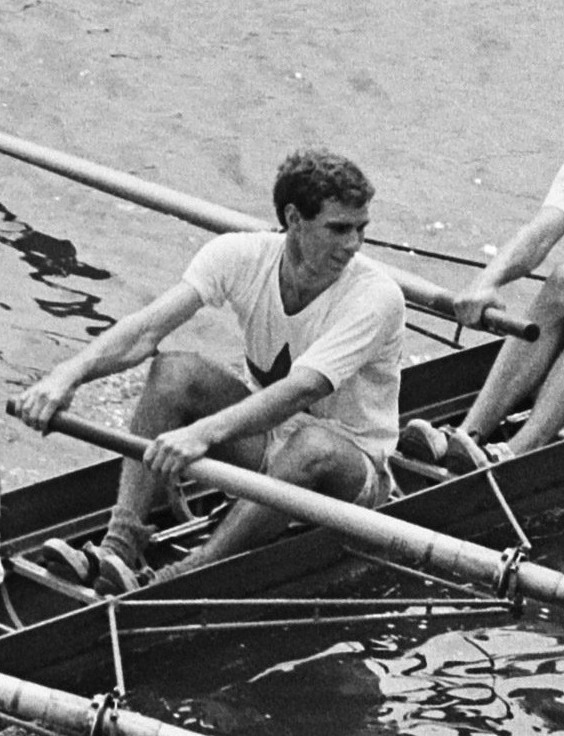
- Tuinzing in 1970

Personal information
- Born: 2 August 1948 The Hague, Netherlands
- Died: 11 January 2024 (aged 75) Amsterdam, Netherlands
- Height: 1.85 m (6 ft 1 in)
- Weight: 80 kg (180 lb)

Sport
- Sport: Rowing
- Club: Aegir, Groningen

Dirk Bram Tuinzing (2 August 1948 – 11 January 2024) was a Dutch rower. He competed at the 1972 Summer Olympics in the eight event and finished in ninth place.

Later he became a professor at the Vrije Universiteit Amsterdam and oral and maxillofacial surgeon. Tuinzing died in Amsterdam on 11 January 2024, at the age of 75.
