= Rowing at the 1972 Summer Olympics =

Rowing at the Games of the XX Olympiad
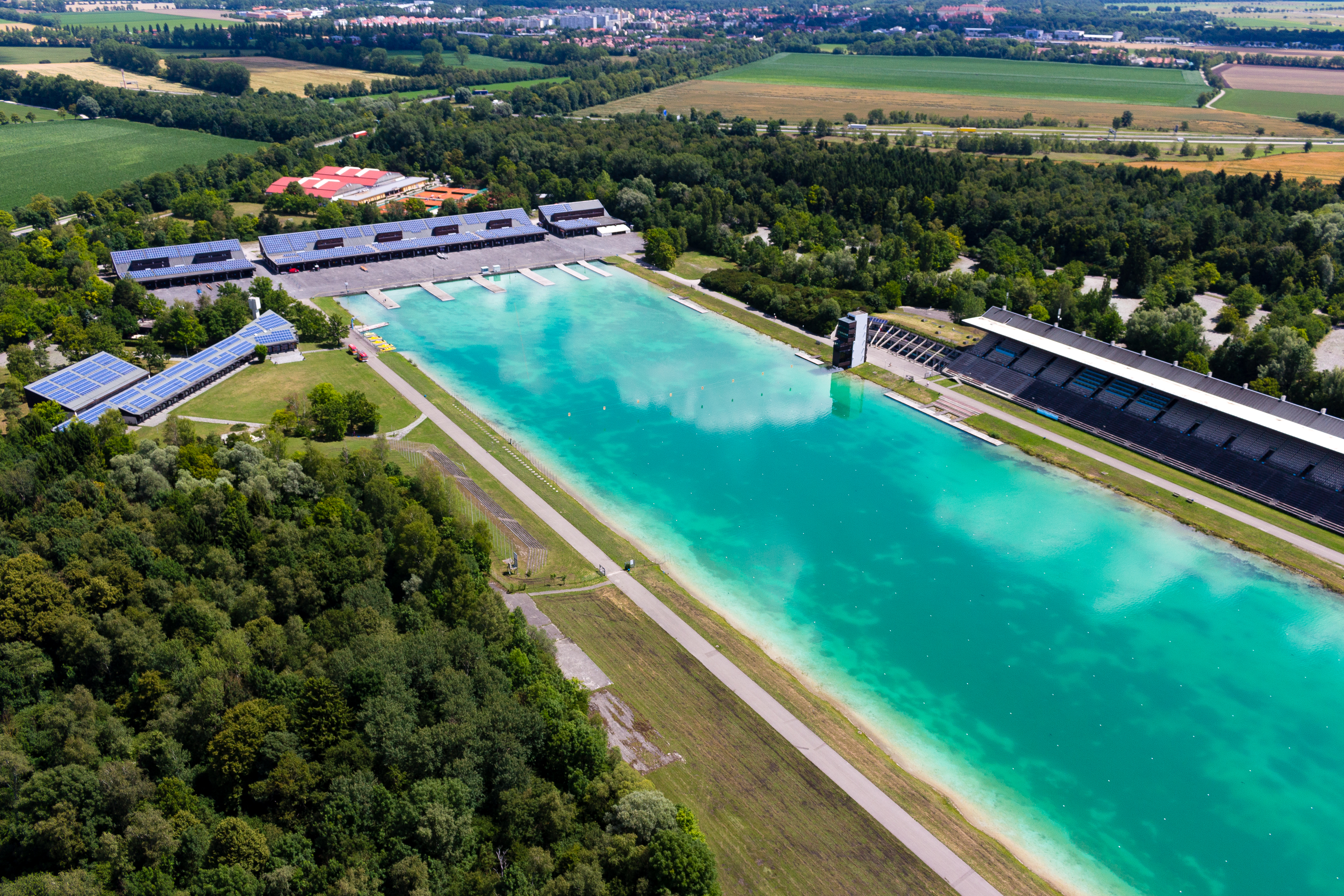
- Aerial view of the venue in Oberschleißheim
- Venue: Oberschleißheim Regatta Course
- Date: 27 August – 2 September 1972
- Competitors: 440 from 35 nations

Rowing at the 1972 Summer Olympics featured 7 events, all for men. It was the last time that rowing did not include women's disciplines at the Olympics.

== Participating nations ==
A total of 440 rowers from 35 nations competed at the Munich:

- Argentina (18)
- Australia (16)
- Austria (16)
- Belgium (5)
- Bermuda (1)
- Brazil (2)
- Bulgaria (8)
- Canada (16)
- Chile (1)
- Cuba (7)
- Czechoslovakia (21)
- Denmark (12)
- East Germany (26)
- Finland (3)
- France (18)
- Great Britain (17)
- Hungary (15)
- Ireland (1)
- Italy (21)
- Japan (3)
- Mexico (9)
- Netherlands (21)
- New Zealand (19)
- North Korea (6)
- Norway (16)
- Poland (16)
- Portugal (3)
- Romania (9)
- Soviet Union (26)
- Sweden (1)
- Switzerland (17)
- United States (26)
- Uruguay (3)
- West Germany (26)
- Yugoslavia (15)

== Medal table ==
Rank	Nation	Gold	Silver	Bronze	Total
1	East Germany	3	1	3	7
2	Soviet Union	2	0	0	2
3	New Zealand	1	1	0	2
4	West Germany	1	0	1	2
5	Czechoslovakia	0	1	1	2
6	Argentina	0	1	0	1
6	Norway	0	1	0	1
6	Switzerland	0	1	0	1
6	United States	0	1	0	1
10	Netherlands	0	0	1	1
10	Romania	0	0	1	1
Totals (11 entries)		7	7	7	21

== Medal summary ==
=== Men's events ===
Games	Gold	Silver	Bronze
single sculls	Yury Malyshev; Soviet Union	Alberto Demiddi; Argentina	Wolfgang Güldenpfennig; East Germany
double sculls	Aleksandr Timoshinin and Gennadi Korshikov; Soviet Union	Frank Hansen and Svein Thøgersen; Norway	Joachim Böhmer and Uli Schmied; East Germany
coxless pair	Siegfried Brietzke and Wolfgang Mager; East Germany	Heinrich Fischer and Alfred Bachmann; Switzerland	Roel Luynenburg and Ruud Stokvis; Netherlands
coxed pair	East Germany; Wolfgang Gunkel; Jörg Lucke; Klaus-Dieter Neubert	Czechoslovakia; Oldřich Svojanovský; Pavel Svojanovský; Vladimír Petříček	Romania; Ștefan Tudor; Petre Ceapura; Ladislau Lovrenschi
coxless four	East Germany; Frank Forberger; Frank Rühle; Dieter Grahn; Dieter Schubert	New Zealand; Dick Tonks; Dudley Storey; Ross Collinge; Noel Mills	West Germany; Joachim Ehrig; Peter Funnekötter; Franz Held; Wolfgang Plottke
coxed four	West Germany; Peter Berger; Hans-Johann Färber; Gerhard Auer; Alois Bierl; Uwe Benter	East Germany; Dietrich Zander; Reinhard Gust; Eckhard Martens; Rolf Jobst; Klaus-Dieter Ludwig	Czechoslovakia; Otakar Mareček; Karel Neffe; Vladimír Jánoš; František Provazník; Vladimír Petříček
eight	New Zealand; Tony Hurt; Wybo Veldman; Dick Joyce; John Hunter; Lindsay Wilson; Joe Earl; Trevor Coker; Gary Robertson; Simon Dickie	United States; Lawrence Terry; Franklin Hobbs; Pete Raymond; Tim Mickelson; Gene Clapp; Bill Hobbs; Cleve Livingston; Mike Livingston; Paul Hoffman	East Germany; Hans-Joachim Borzym; Jörg Landvoigt; Harold Dimke; Manfred Schneider; Hartmut Schreiber; Manfred Schmorde; Bernd Landvoigt; Heinrich Mederow; Dietmar Schwarz
