= Rowing at the 1971 Pan American Games =

Rowing was contested in seven men's events at the 1971 Pan American Games in Cali, Colombia.

== Medal summary ==
=== Medal table ===
Rank	Nation	Gold	Silver	Bronze	Total
1	Argentina	4	1	1	6
2	Brazil	3	2	0	5
3	Cuba	0	3	1	4
4	United States	0	1	3	4
5	Canada	0	0	1	1
5	Uruguay	0	0	1	1
Totals (6 entries)		7	7	7	21

=== Men's events ===
Event	Gold	Silver	Bronze
Single sculls	Alberto Demiddi; Argentina	William Titus; United States	Ramón Luperón; Cuba
Double sculls	Brazil; Harri Klein; Edgard Gijsen	Argentina; Claudio Krotsch; Alfredo Krotsch	United States; John Nunn; Tom McKibbon
Coxless pair	Argentina; Ricardo Rodríguez; Guillermo Figurado	Brazil; Milton Texeira; Wandir Kuntze	United States; Robert Wethmoore; Andrew Roberta
Coxed pair	Brazil; Atalibio Magioni; Celenio Martins; Manuel Mandel (cox)	Cuba; Teófilo López; Lázaro Rivero; Jesús Rosello (cox)	Uruguay; Jorge Buenahora; Pedro Ciapessoni; Roque Martinez (cox)
Coxless four	Brazil; Milton Texeira; Wandir Kuntze; Miguel Bancar; Eriko Souza	Cuba; Porfirio Reynoso; Humberto Roca; Miguel Gonzalez; Eralio Cabrera	Argentina; José Manuel Bugia; Luciano Wilk; Tomás Forray; Oscar de Andrés
Coxed four	Argentina; Hugo Aberastegui; Alfredo Martín; Oscar de Dios; Ignacio Ruiz; Raúl Mazerati (cox)	Cuba; Teofilo Lores; Lázaro Rivero; Troadio Delgado; Germindo Marrero; Jesús Rosello (cox)	United States; Calvin Coffey; Pete Karassik; Bill Miller; Victor Pisinski; Bob Brody (cox)
Eight	Argentina; Alberto Demiddi; Guillermo Segurado; Hugo Aberastegui; Ricardo Rodríguez; Alfredo Martín; Alejo del Cano; Oscar de Dios; Ignacio Cruz; Raúl Mazerati (cox)	United States; Roy Thompson; Fred Schoch; Peter Sun; Richard Copstead; Greg Miller; Cliff Hurn; John Buse; Bruce Beall; Dwight Phillips (cox)	Canada; Ian Gordon; Rod Irving; Karel Jonker; Robert Cunliffe; James Walker; Edgar Smith; Mike Neary; Robert Advent; Michael Conway (cox)
