= Rowing at the 1972 Summer Olympics – Men's coxless four =

Men's coxless four at the Games of the XX Olympiad
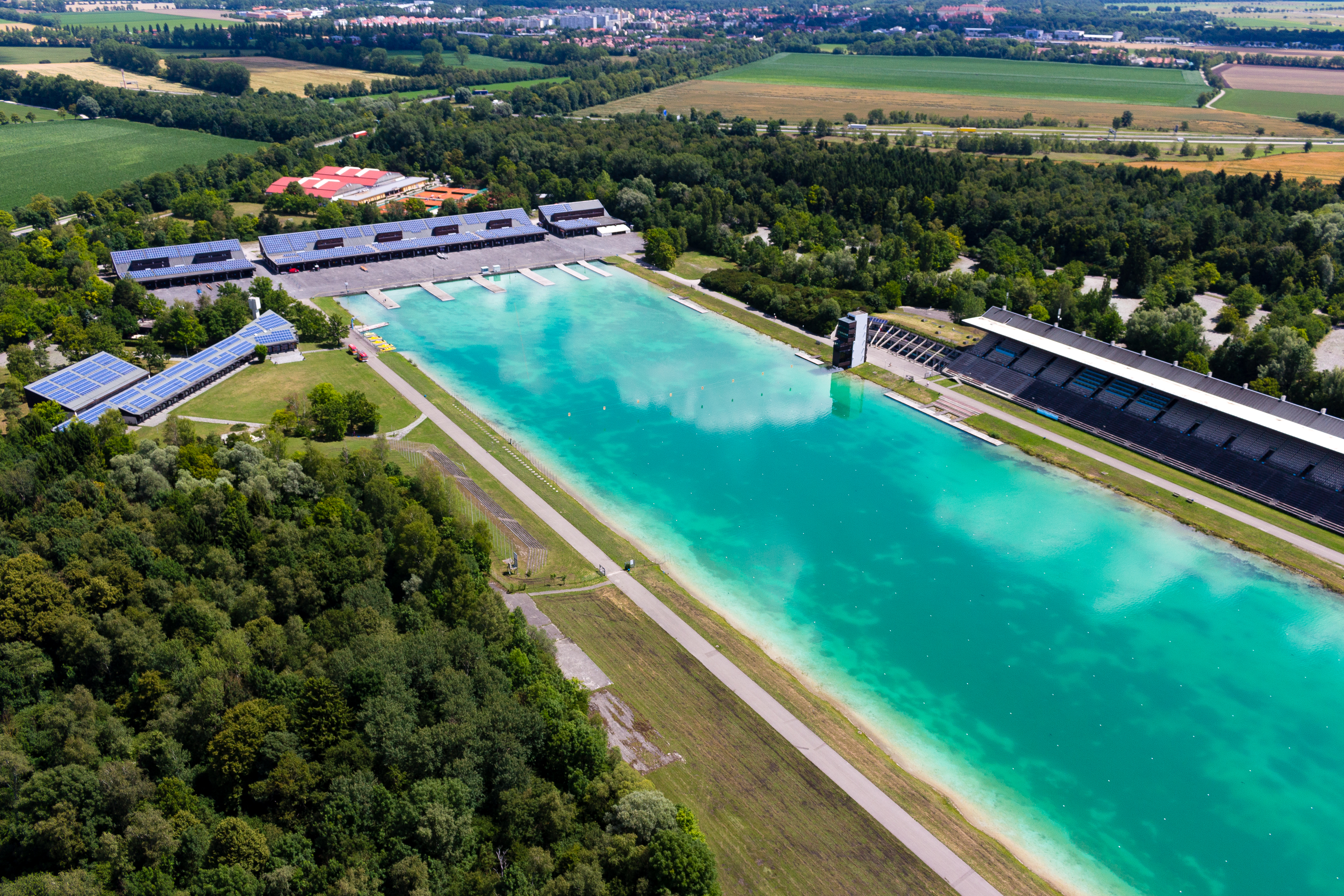
- Aerial view of the venue in Oberschleißheim
- Venue: Oberschleißheim Regatta Course
- Date: 27 August – 2 September 1972
- Competitors: 80; (20 teams) from 20 nations
- Winning time: 6:24.27

Medalists
1st place, gold medalist(s)		Frank Forberger; Frank Rühle; Dieter Grahn; Dieter Schubert	East Germany
2nd place, silver medalist(s)		Dick Tonks; Dudley Storey; Ross Collinge; Noel Mills	New Zealand
3rd place, bronze medalist(s)		Joachim Ehrig; Peter Funnekötter; Franz Held; Wolfgang Plottke	West Germany

The men's coxless four competition at the 1972 Summer Olympics in Munich took place from 27 August to 2 September at the Olympic Regatta Course in Oberschleißheim.

== Results ==
=== Heats ===
The winner of each heat (green) qualifies to the semifinal round, while the remaining competitors go to the repechage.

==== Heat 1 ====
Rank	Rower	Country	Time
1	Emeric Tuşa; Adalbert Agh; Mihai Naumencu; Francisc Papp	Romania	6:49.11
2	Ole Nafstad; Tom Amundsen; Kjell Sverre Johansen; Svein Erik Nilsen	Norway	6:53.27
3	Ian Gordon; Karel Jonker; Gregory Rokosh; Donald Curphey	Canada	7:02.34
4	Marko Mandič; Jože Berc; Jure Potočnik; Miloš Janša	Yugoslavia	7:05.00
5	Kim Ki-tae; Ham Il-nyon; Kim Un-son; Hong Song-su	North Korea	7:10.57

==== Heat 2 ====
Rank	Rower	Country	Time
1	Dick Tonks; Dudley Storey; Ross Collinge; Noel Mills	New Zealand	6:47.27
2	Hans-Jörg Bendiner; Walter Steiner; Thomas Macher; Kurt Baumann	Switzerland	6:55.81
3	Oscar de Andrés; José Manuel Bugia; Luciano Wilk; Tomás Forray	Argentina	6:59.72
4	Csaba Czakó; András Kormos; József Csermely; Antal Melis	Hungary	7:02.98
5	José Luis Morales; Arturo Figueroa; Arcadio Padilla; Juan López	Mexico	7:20.00

==== Heat 3 ====
Rank	Rower	Country	Time
1	Frank Forberger; Dieter Grahn; Frank Rühle; Dieter Schubert	East Germany	6:43.87
2	Fred Smallbone; Lenny Robertson; Jim Clark; Bill Mason	Great Britain	6:45.30
3	Joachim Ehrig; Peter Funnekötter; Franz Held; Wolfgang Plottke	West Germany	6:47.53
4	Primo Baran; Angelo Rossetto; Pier Angelo Conti; Abramo Albini	Italy	6:53.85
5	Patrick Sellier; Roger Rouver; Gérard Chenuet; Yves Fraisse	France	6:56.58

==== Heat 4 ====
Rank	Rower	Country	Time
1	Anatoliy Tkachuk; Igor Kashurov; Aleksandr Motin; Vitaly Sapronov	Soviet Union	6:42.40
2	Willy Poulsen; Peter Fich Christiansen; Egon Pedersen; Rolf Andersen	Denmark	6:47.60
3	Biser Boyadzhiev; Borislav Vasilev; Nikolay Kolev; Metodi Khalvadzhiski	Bulgaria	6:47.99
4	Charles Hewitt; William Miller; Richard Dreissigacker; James Moroney	United States	6:57.05
5	Eralio Cabrera; Troadio Delgado; Ramón Luperón; Angel Serra	Cuba	7:07.61

=== Repechage ===
Top two finishers in each heat qualify to the semifinal round.

==== Repechage 1 ====
Rank	Rower	Country	Time
1	Joachim Ehrig; Peter Funnekötter; Franz Held; Wolfgang Plottke	West Germany	6:58.10
2	Willy Poulsen; Peter Fich Christiansen; Egon Pedersen; Rolf Andersen	Denmark	7:04.37
3	Csaba Czakó; András Kormos; József Csermely; Antal Melis	Hungary	7:16.06
4	Kim Ki-Tae; Ham Il-Nyon; Kim Un-Son; Hong Song-Su	North Korea	7:18.30

==== Repechage 2 ====
Rank	Rower	Country	Time
1	Fred Smallbone; Lenny Robertson; Jim Clark; Bill Mason	Great Britain	7:06.79
2	Eralio Cabrera; Troadio Delgado; Ramón Luperón; Angel Serra	Cuba	7:11.23
3	Oscar de Andrés; José Manuel Bugia; Luciano Wilk; Tomás Forray	Argentina	7:12.74
4	Marko Mandič; Jože Berc; Jure Potočnik; Miloš Janša	Yugoslavia	7:18.18

==== Repechage 3 ====
Rank	Rower	Country	Time
1	Hans-Jörg Bendiner; Walter Steiner; Thomas Macher; Kurt Baumann	Switzerland	7:03.31
2	Ian Gordon; Karel Jonker; Gregory Rokosh; Donald Curphey	Canada	7:06.90
3	Patrick Sellier; Roger Rouver; Gérard Chenuet; Yves Fraisse	France	7:09.33
4	Charles Hewitt; William Miller; Richard Dreissigacker; James Moroney	United States	7:13.95

==== Repechage 4 ====
Rank	Rower	Country	Time
1	Primo Baran; Angelo Rossetto; Pier Angelo Conti; Abramo Albini	Italy	7:00.65
2	Biser Boyadzhiev; Borislav Vasilev; Nikolay Kolev; Metodi Khalvadzhiski	Bulgaria	7:02.69
3	Ole Nafstad; Tom Amundsen; Kjell Sverre Johansen; Svein Erik Nilsen	Norway	7:03.08
4	José Luis Morales; Arturo Figueroa; Arcadio Padilla; Juan López	Mexico	7:32.31

=== Semifinals ===
==== Semifinal A/B ====
First three qualify to the Final A, remainder to Final B.

===== Semifinal 1 =====
Rank	Rower	Country	Time
1	Dick Tonks; Dudley Storey; Ross Collinge; Noel Mills	New Zealand	7:03.99
2	Frank Forberger; Dieter Grahn; Frank Rühle; Dieter Schubert	East Germany	7:06.88
3	Joachim Ehrig; Peter Funnekötter; Franz Held; Wolfgang Plottke	West Germany	7:10.56
4	Ian Gordon; Karel Jonker; Gregory Rokosh; Donald Curphey	Canada	7:13.61
5	Primo Baran; Angelo Rossetto; Pier Angelo Conti; Abramo Albini	Italy	7:14.20
6	Eralio Cabrera; Troadio Delgado; Ramón Luperón; Angel Serra	Cuba	7:36.30

===== Semifinal 2 =====
Rank	Rower	Country	Time
1	Emeric Tuşa; Adalbert Agh; Mihai Naumencu; Francisc Papp	Romania	7:12.50
2	Willy Poulsen; Peter Fich Christiansen; Egon Pedersen; Rolf Andersen	Denmark	7:16.01
3	Anatoliy Tkachuk; Igor Kashurov; Aleksandr Motin; Vitaly Sapronov	Soviet Union	7:16.59
4	Fred Smallbone; Lenny Robertson; Jim Clark; Bill Mason	Great Britain	7:22.21
5	Hans-Jörg Bendiner; Walter Steiner; Thomas Macher; Kurt Baumann	Switzerland	7:23.87
6	Biser Boyadzhiev; Borislav Vasilev; Nikolay Kolev; Metodi Khalvadzhiski	Bulgaria	7:24.93

=== Finals ===
==== Final B ====
Rank	Rower	Country	Time
1	Fred Smallbone; Lenny Robertson; Jim Clark; Bill Mason	Great Britain	6:52.89
2	Biser Boyadzhiev; Borislav Vasilev; Nikolay Kolev; Metodi Khalvadzhiski	Bulgaria	6:54.54
3	Ian Gordon; Karel Jonker; Gregory Rokosh; Donald Curphey	Canada	6:57.18
4	Primo Baran; Angelo Rossetto; Pier Angelo Conti; Abramo Albini	Italy	6:57.59
5	Hans-Jörg Bendiner; Walter Steiner; Thomas Macher; Kurt Baumann	Switzerland	6:59.41
6	Eralio Cabrera; Troadio Delgado; Ramón Luperón; Angel Serra	Cuba	7:10.83

==== Final A ====
Rank	Rower	Country	Time
1st place, gold medalist(s)	Frank Forberger; Dieter Grahn; Frank Rühle; Dieter Schubert	East Germany	6:24.27
2nd place, silver medalist(s)	Dick Tonks; Dudley Storey; Ross Collinge; Noel Mills	New Zealand	6:25.64
3rd place, bronze medalist(s)	Joachim Ehrig; Peter Funnekötter; Franz Held; Wolfgang Plottke	West Germany	6:28.41
4	Anatoliy Tkachuk; Igor Kashurov; Aleksandr Motin; Vitaly Sapronov	Soviet Union	6:31.92
5	Emeric Tuşa; Adalbert Agh; Mihai Naumencu; Francisc Papp	Romania	6:35.60
6	Willy Poulsen; Peter Fich Christiansen; Egon Pedersen; Rolf Andersen	Denmark	6:37.28
