= Rowing at the 1968 Summer Olympics – Men's coxless pair =

Men's coxless pair at the Games of the XIX Olympiad
- Date: 13–18 October 1968
- Competitors: 36 from 18 nations

Medalists
1st place, gold medalist(s)		Jörg Lucke; Heinz-Jürgen Bothe	East Germany
2nd place, silver medalist(s)		Larry Hough; Philip Johnson	United States
3rd place, bronze medalist(s)		Peter Christiansen; Ib Larsen	Denmark

The men's coxless pair competition at the 1968 Summer Olympics took place at took place at Virgilio Uribe Rowing and Canoeing Course, Mexico.

== Competition format ==
This rowing competition consisted of three main rounds (heats, semifinals, and finals), as well as a repechage round that allowed teams that did not win their heats to advance to the semifinals. All races were 2,000 metres in distance.

- Heats: Three heats. With 18 boats entered, there were six boats per heat. The top two boats in each heat (total of 6 boats) advanced directly to the semifinals; all other boats (12 boats) went to the repechage.
- Repechage: Two heats. There were 6 boats in each heat. The top three boats in each heat (total of 6 boats) advanced to the semifinals. The remaining boats (6 boats) were eliminated.
- Semifinals: Two heats. Each heat consisted of 6 boats. The top three boats in each heat advanced to the final; the other three boats in each heat were sent to a 7th–12th place classification race.
- Finals: A main final and a 7th–12th place classification race.

== Results ==
=== Heats ===
==== Heat 1 ====
The first heat featured 4 of the 6 eventual finalists, including the gold and bronze medalists.

Rank	Rowers	Nation	Time	Notes
1	Roel Luynenburg; Ruud Stokvis	Netherlands	7:14.50	Q
2	Peter Christiansen; Ib Larsen	Denmark	7:23.51	Q
3	Heinz-Jürgen Bothe; Jörg Lucke	East Germany	7:30.08	R
4	Fred Rüssli; Werner Zwimpfer	Switzerland	7:36.91	R
5	Ennio Fermo; Marino Specia	Italy	7:42.81	R
6	Günther Karl; Franz Held	West Germany	7:45.49	R

==== Heat 2 ====
Rank	Rowers	Nation	Time	Notes
1	Dieter Ebner; Dieter Losert	Austria	7:31.29	Q
2	Roger Chatelain; Jean-Pierre Drivet	France	7:34.42	Q
3	Alfons Ślusarski; Jerzy Broniec	Poland	7:45.51	R
4	Roberto Friedrich; Fernando Scheffler	Mexico	7:48.28	R
5	Eralio Cabrera; Norge Marrero	Cuba	7:51.94	R
6	Lyle Gatley; John Ulinder	Canada	7:55.10	R

==== Heat 3 ====
Rank	Rowers	Nation	Time	Notes
1	Larry Hough; Philip Johnson	United States	7:19.92	Q
2	David Ramage Paul Guest	Australia	7:24.66	Q
3	András Pályi; László Romvári	Hungary	7:33.31	R
4	Apolinaras Grigas; Vladimir Rikkanen	Soviet Union	7:35.61	R
5	Kauko Hänninen; Pekka Sylvander	Finland	7:37.34	R
6	Esteban Masseilot; José Sigot	Uruguay	7:42.35	R

=== Repechage ===
==== Repechage heat 1 ====
Rank	Rowers	Nation	Time	Notes
1	Heinz-Jürgen Bothe; Jörg Lucke	East Germany	7:21.92	Q
2	Ennio Fermo; Marino Specia	Italy	7:23.77	Q
3	András Pályi; László Romvári	Hungary	7:26.39	Q
4	Lyle Gatley; John Ulinder	Canada	7:33.46	
5	Kauko Hänninen; Pekka Sylvander	Finland	7:40.50	
6	Roberto Friedrich; Fernando Scheffler	Mexico	7:43.38	

==== Repechage heat 2 ====
Rank	Rowers	Nation	Time	Notes
1	Fred Rüssli; Werner Zwimpfer	Switzerland	7:26.33	Q
2	Günther Karl; Franz Held	West Germany	7:31.91	Q
3	Alfons Ślusarski; Jerzy Broniec	Poland	7:35.81	Q
4	Esteban Masseilot; José Sigot	Uruguay	7:37.95	
5	Eralio Cabrera; Norge Marrero	Cuba	7:50.88	
–	Apolinaras Grigas; Vladimir Rikkanen	Soviet Union	DNF	

=== Semifinals ===
==== Semifinal 1 ====
Rank	Rowers	Nation	Time	Notes
1	Roel Luynenburg; Ruud Stokvis	Netherlands	7:15.51	Q
2	Dieter Ebner; Dieter Losert	Austria	7:15.53	Q
3	Fred Rüssli; Werner Zwimpfer	Switzerland	7:16.09	Q
4	David Ramage Paul Guest	Australia	7:17.09	C
5	Ennio Fermo; Marino Specia	Italy	7:29.75	C
6	Alfons Ślusarski; Jerzy Broniec	Poland	7:40.10	C

==== Semifinal 2 ====
Rank	Rowers	Nation	Time	Notes
1	Larry Hough; Philip Johnson	United States	7:21.50	Q
2	Peter Christiansen; Ib Larsen	Denmark	7:24.98	Q
3	Heinz-Jürgen Bothe; Jörg Lucke	East Germany	7:32.16	Q
4	Roger Chatelain; Jean-Pierre Drivet	France	7:43.79	C
5	András Pályi; László Romvári	Hungary	7:45.73	C
6	Günther Karl; Franz Held	West Germany	7:53.06	C

=== Finals ===
==== Classification 7–12 ====
Rank	Rowers	Nation	Time
7	David Ramage Paul Guest	Australia	7:19.49
8	Alfons Ślusarski; Jerzy Broniec	Poland	7:22.89
9	András Pályi; László Romvári	Hungary	7:26.00
10	Ennio Fermo; Marino Specia	Italy	7:32.50
11	Roger Chatelain; Jean-Pierre Drivet	France	7:37.64
12	Günther Karl; Franz Held	West Germany	7:40.88

==== Final ====
Rank	Rowers	Nation	Time
1st place, gold medalist(s)	Heinz-Jürgen Bothe; Jörg Lucke	East Germany	7:26.56
2nd place, silver medalist(s)	Larry Hough; Philip Johnson	United States	7:26.71
3rd place, bronze medalist(s)	Peter Christiansen; Ib Larsen	Denmark	7:31.84
4	Dieter Ebner; Dieter Losert	Austria	7:41.80
5	Fred Rüssli; Werner Zwimpfer	Switzerland	7:46.79
6	Roel Luynenburg; Ruud Stokvis	Netherlands	ST
