= New Zealand at the 1972 Summer Olympics =

- IOC code: NZL
- NOC: New Zealand Olympic and British Commonwealth Games Association
- Website: www.olympic.org.nz

in Munich
- Competitors: 89 (82 men, 7 women) in 14 sports
- Flag bearer: David Aspin (Wrestling)
- Medals Ranked 23rd: Gold 1 Silver 1 Bronze 1 Total 3

Summer Olympics appearances (overview)
- 1908; 1912; 1920; 1924; 1928; 1932; 1936; 1948; 1952; 1956; 1960; 1964; 1968; 1972; 1976; 1980; 1984; 1988; 1992; 1996; 2000; 2004; 2008; 2012; 2016; 2020; 2024; 2028

Other related appearances
- Australasia (1908–1912)

New Zealand competed at the 1972 Summer Olympics in Munich, West Germany. For the first time at the Olympics, God Defend New Zealand was played instead of God Save the King/Queen. The New Zealand Olympic Committee was represented by 89 competitors, 82 men and 7 women, who took part in 63 events in 14 sports.

== Medal tables ==
Medal	Name	Sport	Event	Date
Gold	Tony Hurt; Wybo Veldman; Dick Joyce; John Hunter; Lindsay Wilson; Joe Earl; Trevor Coker; Gary Robertson; Simon Dickie (cox)	Rowing	Men's eight	2 September
Silver	Dick Tonks; Dudley Storey; Ross Collinge; Noel Mills	Rowing	Men's coxless four	2 September
Bronze	Rod Dixon	Athletics	Men's 1500 metres	10 September

Medals by sport
Sport	Gold medal	Silver medal	Bronze medal	Total
Rowing	1	1	0	2
Athletics	0	0	1	1
Total	1	1	1	3

Medals by gender
Gender	Gold medal	Silver medal	Bronze medal	Total
Male	1	1	1	3
Female	0	0	0	0
Total	1	1	1	3

== Archery ==
In the first modern archery competition at the Olympics, New Zealand entered one man in the competition.

Athlete	Event	Round 1						Round 2						Total	Rank
Athlete	Event	30 m	50 m	70 m	90 m	Total	Rank	30 m	50 m	70 m	90 m	Total	Rank	Total	Rank
Robin Sampson	Men's individual	278	268	279	235	1060	53	309	210	289	247	1055	53	2115	53

== Athletics ==
=== Track and road ===
Athlete	Event	Heat		Quarterfinal		Semifinal		Final	
Athlete	Event	Result	Rank (Note: Ranks given are within the heat)	Result	Rank (Note: Ranks given are within the quarterfinal)	Result	Rank (Note: Ranks given are within the semifinal)	Result	Rank
Laurie D'Arcy	Men's 100 m	10.77	5	did not advance					
Rod Dixon	Men's 1500 m	3:40.0	2 Q	—N/a		3:37.9	1 Q	3:37.5	3rd place, bronze medalist(s)
Jack Foster	Men's marathon	—N/a						2:16:56	8
Sue Haden	Women's 800 m	2:04.86	4	—N/a		did not advance			
Penny Hunt	Women's 400 m	52.82	2 Q	52.66	6	did not advance			
Roger Johnson	Men's 400 m hurdles	50.48	4	—N/a		did not advance			
Terry Manners	Men's marathon	—N/a						2:25:29	34
Brenda Matthews	Women's 100 m	11.77	5 Q	11.87	8	did not advance			
Brenda Matthews	Women's 100 m hurdles	13.81	5	—N/a		did not advance			
Dave McKenzie	Men's marathon	—N/a						2:22:19	22
Tony Polhill	Men's 1500 m	3:42.3	2 Q	—N/a		3:41.8	3 Q	3:41.8	9
Dick Quax	Men's 5000 m	14:35.2	9	—N/a				did not advance	
Bevan Smith	Men's 200 m	21.17	3 Q	21.04	4	did not advance			
Dick Tayler	Men's 5000 m	13:56.2	10	—N/a				did not advance	
Gavin Thorley	Men's 5000 m	14:11.6	10	—N/a				did not advance	
Gavin Thorley	Men's 10,000 m	DNF		—N/a				did not advance	

=== Field ===
Athlete	Event	Qualification		Final	
Athlete	Event	Result	Rank	Result	Rank
Les Mills	Men's shot put	18.38	23	did not advance	
Les Mills	Men's discus throw	59.22	14 Q	55.86	14
Robin Tait	Men's discus throw	56.60	20	did not advance	

== Boxing ==
Athlete	Event	Round of 64	Round of 32	Round of 16	Quarterfinals	Semifinals	Final	Rank
Athlete	Event	Opposition Result	Opposition Result	Opposition Result	Opposition Result	Opposition Result	Opposition Result	Rank
Jeff Rackley	Men's welterweight	Bye	Meier (FRG); L 0 – 5	did not advance				=17
Pat Ryan	Men's featherweight	Bye	Kobayashi (JPN); L 1 – 4	did not advance				=17

== Canoeing ==
Athlete	Event	Heats		Repechages		Semifinals		Final	
Athlete	Event	Time	Rank	Time	Rank	Time	Rank	Time	Rank
Donald Cooper	Men's K-1 1000 m	4:12.45	5 R	4:02.48	1 Q	4:01.97	5	did not advance	
Donald Cooper; Tom Dooney	Men's K-2 1000 m	3:56.48	5 R	3:45.65	5	did not advance			

== Cycling ==
Eight cyclists represented New Zealand in 1972.

=== Road ===
Men's individual road race

Athlete	Time	Rank
Bruce Biddle	4:15:04	3 (Note: Biddle was classified as the third-placed finisher after Jaime Huélamo of Spain was disqualified for failing a drugs test. The bronze medal was, however, not awarded to Biddle as he had not been drug-tested.)
Paul Brydon	4:17:03	50
Vern Hanaray	DNF	
Robert Oliver	DNF	

=== Track ===
Men's 1000 m time trial

Athlete	Time	Rank
Harry Kent	1:09.10	16

Men's team pursuit

Athlete	Qualification		Quarterfinals	Semifinals	Final / BM	
Athlete	Time	Rank	Opposition Time	Opposition Time	Opposition Time	Rank
Paul Brydon; John Dean; Neil Lyster; Blair Stockwell	4:35.11	14	did not advance			

Brent Pascoe was the reserve rider, but did not compete.

== Gymnastics ==
=== Men's individual ===
Apparatus qualifying and all-around

Athlete	Floor			Pommel horse			Rings			Vault			Parallel bars			Horizontal bar			All-around total	All-around rank
Athlete	C	O	Rank	C	O	Rank	C	O	Rank	C	O	Rank	C	O	Rank	C	O	Rank	All-around total	All-around rank
Terry Sale	7.300	8.650	=104	6.500	8.050	=101	6.600	7.350	110	9.000	8.900	=71	6.650	8.500	110	6.150	8.400	110	92.050	110

Sale did not qualify for any of the apparatus finals.

=== Women's individual ===
Apparatus qualifying and all-around

Athlete	Vault			Uneven bars			Balance beam			Floor			All-around total	All-around rank
Athlete	C	O	Rank	C	O	Rank	C	O	Rank	C	O	Rank	All-around total	All-around rank
Diane Foote	8.600	8.900	=69	7.950	7.800	113	8.400	8.100	94	8.350	8.750	=99	66.850	=104

Foote did not qualify for any of the apparatus finals.

== Field hockey ==
=== Men's tournament ===
Team roster

Jeff Archibald; Arthur Borren; Jan Borren; John Christensen; Greg Dayman; Chris Ineson; Ross McPherson; Barry Maister	Selwyn Maister; Trevor Manning; Arthur Parkin; Ramesh Patel; Alan Patterson; Kevin Rigby; Ted Salmon; Warwick Wright

Head coach

Ross Gillespie

Group B

27 August 1972

New Zealand	1–1	Australia

28 August 1972

New Zealand	7–0	Mexico

30 August 1972

New Zealand	2–1	Great Britain

31 August 1972

Netherlands	2–0	New Zealand

2 September 1972

New Zealand	3–3	Poland

3 September 1972

New Zealand	2–2	Kenya

4 September 1972

India	3–2	New Zealand

Team	Pld	W	D	L	GF	GA	Pts	Qualification
India	7	5	2	0	25	8	12	Advance to semi-finals
Netherlands	7	5	1	1	20	9	11	Advance to semi-finals
Great Britain	7	4	1	2	15	10	9	5th–8th place classification
Australia	7	3	2	2	18	8	8	5th–8th place classification
New Zealand	7	2	3	2	16	11	7	9th / 10th place play-off
Poland	7	2	2	3	12	12	6	11th / 12th place play-off
Kenya	7	1	1	5	8	17	3	13th / 14th place play-off
Mexico	7	0	0	7	1	40	0	15th / 16th place play-off

9th / 10th Place play-off

8 September 1972

New Zealand	2–1 (0–0)	Belgium

New Zealand finished the men's field hockey tournament in ninth place.

== Judo ==
Athlete	Event	Pool					Repechages			Semifinal	Final	Rank
Athlete	Event	Round of 64	Round of 32	Round of 16	Quarterfinal	Semifinal	Repechage	Semifinal	Final	Semifinal	Final	Rank
Athlete	Event	Opposition Result	Opposition Result	Opposition Result	Opposition Result	Opposition Result	Opposition Result	Opposition Result	Opposition Result	Opposition Result	Opposition Result	Rank
Rick Littlewood	Men's middleweight	Bye	Adamczyk (POL); W	Bijkerk (AUS); W	Sekine (JPN); L	did not advance						=11

== Rowing ==
1972 was the last year that only men competed at the Olympic rowing events. New Zealand entered boats in four of the seven events. The gold medal won by the 1972 New Zealand eight is one of New Zealand's most memorable performances, and was in 2008 rated by sports journalist Joseph Romanos as New Zealand's best ever team performance at the Olympic Games.

Athlete	Event	Heats		Repechage		Semifinals		Final	
Athlete	Event	Time	Rank	Time	Rank	Time	Rank	Time	Rank
Murray Watkinson	Single sculls	7:51.29	2 R	8:11.51	3 SA/B	8:30.88	5 FB	8:05.42	10
Dick Tonks; Dudley Storey; Ross Collinge; Noel Mills	Coxless four	6:47.27	1 SA/B	Bye		7:03.99	1 FA	6:25.64	2nd place, silver medalist(s)
Warren Cole; Chris Nilsson; John Clark; David Lindstrom; Peter Lindsay	Coxed four	6:51,76	3 SA/B	Bye		7:21.94	3 FA	6:42.55	6
Tony Hurt; Wybo Veldman; Dick Joyce; John Hunter; Lindsay Wilson; Joe Earl; Trevor Coker; Gary Robertson; Simon Dickie (cox)	Eight	6:06.19	1 R	Bye		6:28.40	2 FA	6:08.94	1st place, gold medalist(s)

== Sailing ==
Athlete	Event	Race							Net points	Final rank
Athlete	Event	1	2	3	4	5	6	7	Net points	Final rank
Fraser Beer; Noel Everett (helm); Ron Watson	Dragon	14.0	19.0	~~21.0~~	15.0	3.0	0.0	C	51.0	5
Jock Bilger (helm); Murray Ross	Flying Dutchman	20.0	~~27.0~~	3.0	3.0	10.0	17.0	24.0	79.0	9
Bret De Thier	Finn	15.0	11.7	21.0	3.0	33.0	~~41.0~~; ~~DNF~~	26.0	109.7	10
Con Linton; Steve Marten (helm); Jack Scholes	Soling	20.0	24.0	25.0	~~26.0~~	26.0	18.0	C	113.0	21

Jonty Farmer, Jack Hansen, Geoff Smals and Bryan Treleaven were named as alternates but did not compete.

== Shooting ==
Four male shooters represented New Zealand in 1972.

Mixed 25 m rapid fire pistol

Athlete	Round 1	Round 2	Round 3	Total	Rank
Bruce McMillan	197	195	190	582	28

Mixed 50 m rifle, prone

Athlete	Round 1	Round 2	Round 3	Round 4	Round 5	Round 6	Total	Rank
Ian Ballinger	98	100	100	100	97	96	591	46
Mike Watt	99	98	100	100	99	97	593	29

Mixed 50 m running target

Athlete	Slow run	Fast run	Total	Rank
Graeme McIntyre	270	253	523	26

== Swimming ==
Athlete	Event	Heat		Semifinal		Final	
Athlete	Event	Result	Rank	Result	Rank	Result	Rank
Heather Coombridge	Women's 100 m freestyle	1:02.95	35	did not advance			
Heather Coombridge	Women's 200 m freestyle	2:14.78	22	—N/a		did not advance	
Colin Herring	Men's 100 m freestyle	54.41	=22	did not advance			
Colin Herring	Men's 200 m freestyle	2:00.29	26	—N/a		did not advance	
Susan Hunter	Women's 100 m backstroke	1:10.06	26	did not advance			
Susan Hunter	Women's 200 m backstroke	2:28.28	21	—N/a		did not advance	
Susan Hunter	Women's 200 m individual medley	2:30.29	17	—N/a		did not advance	
Susan Hunter	Women's 400 m individual medley	5:14.47	9	—N/a		did not advance	
John McConnochie	Men's 200 m individual medley	2:15.04	15	—N/a		did not advance	
John McConnochie	Men's 400 m individual medley	4:49.89	17	—N/a		did not advance	
Jaynie Parkhouse	Women's 400 m freestyle	4:40.24	19	—N/a		did not advance	
Jaynie Parkhouse	Women's 800 m freestyle	9:34.65	16	—N/a		did not advance	
Mark Treffers	Men's 400 m freestyle	4:14.10	20	—N/a		did not advance	
Mark Treffers	Men's 1500 m freestyle	16:23.86	6 Q	—N/a		16:18.84	6

== Weightlifting ==
Athlete	Event	Press		Snatch		Clean & Jerk		Total	Rank
Athlete	Event	Result	Rank	Result	Rank	Result	Rank	Total	Rank
John Bolton	Men's middle heavyweight	NVL		—N/a					DNF
Tony Ebert	Men's middleweight	137.5	=16	117.5	=17	155.0	=15	410.0	17
Brian Marsden	Men's light heavyweight	142.5	15	120.0	=17	172.5	=9	435.0	12

== Wrestling ==
Athlete	Event	Round 1	Round 2	Round 3	Round 4	Round 5	Final	Rank
Athlete	Event	Opposition Result	Opposition Result	Opposition Result	Opposition Result	Opposition Result	Opposition Result	Rank
David Aspin	Men's freestyle middleweight	Birajdar (IND); Both DQ	Hagilou (IRI); L	Eliminated				

== Officials ==
- Chef de Mission – Joe McManemin
- Assistant team manager – Jack Prestney
- Team doctor – Tom Anderson
- Chaperone – Doris Fitzsimmons
- Archery section manager – Jack Richards
- Athletics
  - Section manager – Graham Davy
  - Coach – Valdemars Briedis
- Boxing section manager – David Tipping
- Canoeing section manager – Stan Robinson
- Cycling
  - Section manager – Colin Hollows
  - Coach / mechanic – Bruce Goldsworthy
- Field hockey
  - Section manager – Merv Good
  - Coach – Ross Gillespie
- Gymnastics section manager – Cameron A. R. Buchanan
- Judo section manager – Jack Fielding
- Rowing
  - Section manager – Fred Strachan
  - Coach – Rusty Robertson
  - Assistant coach – Ted Lindstrom
- Sailing section manager – Hal Wagstaff
- Shooting section manager – Hong Tse
- Swimming
  - Section manager – Graeme Brockett
  - Coach – Pic Parkhouse
- Weightlifting
  - Section manager – Peter Watson
  - Coach – Paul Newberry
- Wrestling section manager – Art Pickering
