= Götz Draeger =

German rower (born 1944)

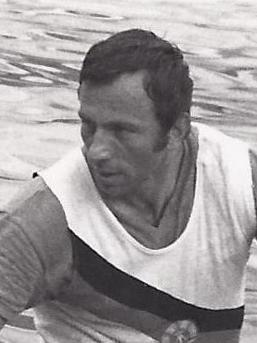
- Götz Draeger in 1970

Personal information
- Born: 31 July 1944 (age 81)

Sport
- Sport: Rowing
- Club: SC Berlin-Grünau
Medal record
Men's rowing
Representing East Germany
World Rowing Championships
Gold medal – first place	1974 Lucerne	Quad scull
Silver medal – second place	1970 St. Catharines	Single sculls
European Rowing Championships
Silver medal – second place	1971 Copenhagen	Single sculls

Götz Draeger (born 31 July 1944), sometimes incorrectly referred to as Dräger, is a German rower.

== Rowing career ==
Draeger was born in 1944 in Bad Landeck in Silesia; his home town was named Lądek-Zdrój after the war and is now part of Poland. In his youth, he competed in decathlon and played handball. He started rowing in 1965 aged 21 for TSC Berlin, which in 1969 became SC Berlin-Grünau. In his second year rowing, he came second in the 1966 East German rowing championships in double scull partnered with Uli Schmied. In 1969, he again came second with Schmied in double scull, and also came second in single scull, beaten by Joachim Böhmer. At the 1970 East German championships, he came third in the double scull with Christof Kreuziger, and won the single scull title. This qualified Draeger to compete at the 1970 World Rowing Championships in St. Catharines, Ontario, Canada in the single scull, succeeding Achim Hill who had for many years dominated the boat class in East Germany. In Canada, Draeger could not beat the champion from the 1969 European Rowing Championships, the Argentinian Alberto Demiddi, but he came second. For his success, he was awarded Master of Sport in September 1970.

Draeger won the East German single scull championship title again in 1971. At the 1971 European Rowing Championships in Copenhagen, he once again came second to the Argentinian Demiddi. During 1972, Draeger was not in form. At a regatta on the Rotsee in Lucerne, Switzerland, he came fifth in the single scull, with his Wolfgang Güldenpfennig (SC Magdeburg) in third place. Whilst Draeger was nominated for the 1972 Summer Olympics in Munich, he went as a reserve only and did not compete. It was Güldenpfennig who competed in the single scull at the Olympics, and he won a bronze medal.

Draeger regained some of his form in 1973, when he came third in the 1973 East German championships in single scull (Güldenpfennig came first, and Joachim Dreifke was second). He won an international regatta in Prague in June 1973 in the single scull. SC Berlin-Grünau first competed in the East German championships in the quad scull in 1973 (a new boat class at the time), when Draeger's boat came third. In 1974, quad scull teams were formed by rowers from different clubs, and the composite team made up of Dreifke, Draeger, Rüdiger Reiche, and Jürgen Bertow became national champions. The same team went to the 1974 World Rowing Championships in Lucerne, where the quad scull made its first appearance in the world championship programme. The rowers from East Germany were successful and won the world championship title, ahead of teams from the Soviet Union and Czechoslovakia. In November 1974 alongside all other East German World Rowing Championship winners, Draeger was awarded a Patriotic Order of Merit in bronze.

In 1975, Draeger lost his seat in the East German composite crew to Martin Winter, with the other three remaining in the team. This new composition came second at the East German championships, and the winning crew went on to win the 1975 World Rowing Championships.

== Professional career ==
Whilst he was actively competing, Draeger had graduated with a chemical engineering degree from the Humboldt University of Berlin, specialising in fermentation and technology. Draeger later gained a PhD in food chemistry and guided the scientific rowing centre of the Deutscher Turn- und Sportbund, the East German mass organisation responsible for sport. Later, he was a representative for a pharmaceutical company until his retirement.
