= Curphey =

Curphey is a surname of Manx origin. Notable people with the surname include:

- John Michael William Curphey Forrestall (1932–2006), Canadian politician
- Aldington George Curphey (1880–1958), Anglo-Jamaican surgeon, medical officer and politician
- Donald Curphey (born 1948), Canadian rower
- Margaret Curphey (1938–2024), British soprano
- Theodore Curphey (1897–1986), American coroner
- William Curphey (1895–1917), British World War I flying ace

== See also ==
- Curphey Peaks, in the Explorers Range, Victoria Land, Australia
