= Heinz-Jürgen Bothe =

East German rower

Personal information
- Born: 5 November 1941 (age 84) Berlin, Germany

Sport
- Sport: Rowing
Medal record
Men's rowing
Representing East Germany
Olympic Games
Gold medal – first place	1968 Mexico City	Coxless pair
World Rowing Championships
Bronze medal – third place	1966 Bled	Eight
European Rowing Championships
Silver medal – second place	1969 Klagenfurt	Coxed four

Heinz-Jürgen Bothe (born 5 November 1941) is a German rower who competed for East Germany in the 1968 Summer Olympics.

He was born in Berlin.

In 1968 he and his partner Jörg Lucke won the gold medal in the coxless pair event.
