= Maïmouna Gueye =

Senegalese actress

- Born: Maïmouna Gueye; Sénégal
- Occupations: Actress, model, screenplay writer, entrepreneur
- Years active: 2003–present

Maïmouna Gueye Fall is a Franco–Sénégalese actress. She is best known for her roles in the films The Climb, Payoff, Cuties, Bacon on the Side.

== Personal life ==
After the marriage with a French man, she went to France in 1998. However, after few months, she divorced after facing racism and stereotypes from the husband. After the divorce, she moved to Paris.

== Career ==
Gueye started acting career with the stage play in an adaptation of Sophocles Antigone under the supervision of Haitian writer, Gérard Chenet. In 2004, she acted in another stage play, the French adaptation of the famous Monologues du vagin by Eve Ensler. Later she moved to theater production and made the popular plays, Souvenirs de la dame en noir and She is black, but she is beautiful.

After many theater plays, she finally appeared in cinema with her debut role in the film Payoff in 2003. Later she made the lead role in the film Touristes? Oh yes! directed by Jean-Pierre Mocky in 2004.

She is the founder of 'Afrokids', a children's recreation club that provides painting, reading, dancing, storytelling, and DIY workshops.

== Filmography ==
Year	Film	Role	Genre	Ref.
2003	Payoff		Film	
2003	Gomez et Tavarès		Film	
2004	Touristes? Oh yes!		Film	
2008	Le monde est petit	Fatou	TV movie	
2009	La Première Étoile	Coiffeuse	Film	
2010	Il reste du jambon ?	Val	Film	
2012	Drôle de famille!	Aglae	TV series	
2015	Maman(s)	Mariam	Short film	
2015	Persuasif	Mme Koné	TV series	
2016	He Even Has Your Eyes	Madame Diop	Film	
2017	L'Ascension		Film	
2017	The Climb	Evelyne Diakhaté	Film	
2017	Il a déjà tes yeux		Film	
2017	Le Flic de Belleville	Iman Touré	Film	
2018	Souffle de vie	Infirmière réanimation	Film	
2019	La reine de l'évasion	Femme TV	Short film	
2019	L'Ordre des médecins		Film	
2020	Mignonnes	Mariam	Film	
