= Rolf Andersen =

Rolf Andersen may refer to:

- Rolf Andersen (diplomat) (1897–1980), Norwegian diplomat
- Rolf Andersen (politician) (1916–1990), Norwegian Labour Party politician
- Rolf Andersen (rower) (born 1945), Danish Olympic rower
- Rolf Andersen (1920) (1920–2016), Norwegian conductor
- Rolf Trolle Andersen (born 1945), Norwegian diplomat
- Rolf Erling Andersen (1947–2021), Norwegian politician
