= Sapronov =

Sapronov (feminine: Sapronova) is a Russian-language surname.

- Irina Saltykova (born 1966), née Sapronova
- Timofei Sapronov (1887–1937), Russian revolutionary, Old Bolshevik, and socialist militant
- Valentyn Sapronov (1932–2019), Ukrainian association footballer
- Vitaly Sapronov (born 1945), Soviet rower
