= Dieter Grahn =

East German rower

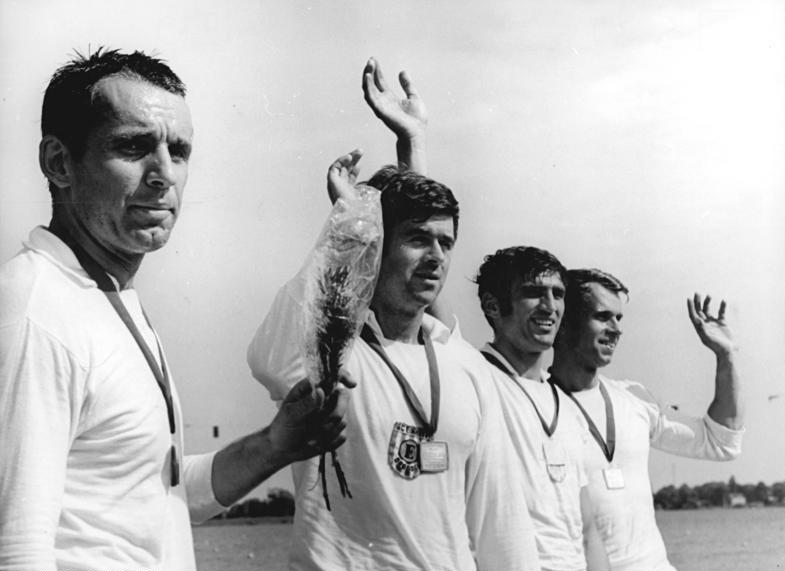
- After the national championship in Brandenburg 1970 from the left: Frank Forberger, Frank Rühle, Dieter Grahn, and Dieter Schubert

Personal information
- Born: 20 March 1944 (age 82) Zobten, Silesia, Germany

Sport
- Sport: Rowing
Medal record
Men's rowing
Representing East Germany
Olympic Games
Gold medal – first place	1968 Mexico City	Coxless four
Gold medal – first place	1972 Munich	Coxless four
World Rowing Championships
Gold medal – first place	1966 Bled	Coxless four
Gold medal – first place	1970 St. Catharines	Coxless four
European Rowing Championships
Gold medal – first place	1967 Vichy	Coxless four
Gold medal – first place	1971 Copenhagen	Coxless four
Silver medal – second place	1969 Klagenfurt	Coxless pair

Dieter Grahn (born 20 March 1944) is a German rower who competed for East Germany in the 1968 Summer Olympics and in the 1972 Summer Olympics.

He was born in Zobten, Silesia, Germany (today in Poland). In 1968 he was a crew member of the East German boat which won the gold medal in the coxless four event. Four years later he won his second gold medal with the East German boat in the coxless four event.

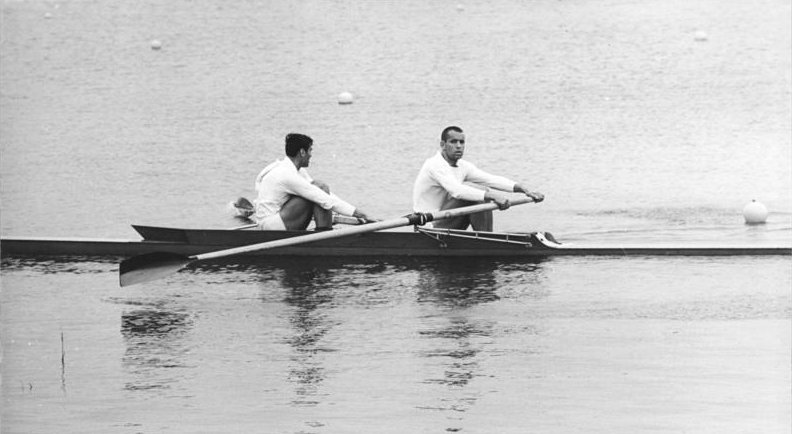
Dieter Grahn (left) and Frank Forberger

== See also ==
- World Rowing Championships
