= Tom Amundsen =

Norwegian rower (1943–2017)

Personal information
- Born: 4 February 1943 Oslo
- Died: 3 September 2017 (aged 74) Oslo
- Education: University of Oslo
- Occupation: physician
- Height: 190 cm (6 ft 3 in)
- Weight: 85 kg (187 lb)

Sport
- Sport: Rowing
- Club: Norske Studenters Roklub
Medal record
Men's rowing
Representing Norway
European Rowing Championships
| Silver medal – second place | 1971 Copenhagen | Coxless four |

Tom Amundsen (4 February 1943 – 3 September 2017) was a Norwegian sport rower and physician.

Amundsen was born in Oslo in 1943. He started rowing while he studied medicine at the University of Oslo, and he belonged to Norske Studenters Roklub.

Amundsen competed at the 1971 European Rowing Championships and won a silver medal with the coxless four. He competed at the 1972 Summer Olympics in Munich in the coxless four and the team was eliminated in the round one repêchage. At the 1973 European Rowing Championships in Moscow, he competed with Kjell Sverre Johansen in the coxless pair and they came eleventh. At the 1976 Summer Olympics in Montreal, he competed with the coxed four and they were eliminated in the round one repêchage.

Amundsen became a specialist in physical medicine and rehabilitation in 1978. He became a specialist in neurology in 1983. During his entire career, he worked at hospitals with the exception of 1988, when he was part of the United Nations Interim Force in Lebanon.

Amundsen died on 3 September 2017 in Oslo. He had been married with three children.
