= Emeric Tușa =

Romanian rower

Personal information
- Nationality: Romanian
- Born: 23 September 1941 (age 83); Tamașfalău, Romania

Sport
- Sport: Rowing

Emeric Tușa (born 23 September 1941) is a Romanian rower. He competed in the men's coxless four event at the 1972 Summer Olympics.
