= Franz Held =

West German rower (born 1948)

Personal information
- Born: 6 May 1948 (age 78) Passau
- Height: 188 cm (6 ft 2 in)
- Weight: 90 kg (198 lb)

Sport
- Sport: Rowing
- Club: Passauer RV
Medal record
Men's rowing
Representing West Germany
Olympic Games
Bronze medal – third place	1972 Munich	Coxless four
European Rowing Championships
Bronze medal – third place	1969 Klagenfurt	Eight
Bronze medal – third place	1971 Copenhagen	Coxless four

Franz Held (born 6 May 1948) is a German rower who competed for West Germany in the 1968 Summer Olympics and in the 1972 Summer Olympics.

Held was born in Passau.

In 1968, Held and his partner, Günther Karl, finished twelfth in the coxless pair event. He competed at the 1971 European Rowing Championships and won a bronze medal with the coxless four. At the 1972 Summer Olympics in Munich, he was a crew member of the West German boat that won the bronze medal in the coxless four event.
