= Walter Steiner (rower) =

Swiss rower

Personal information
- Nationality: Swiss
- Born: 10 September 1946
- Died: 5 December 2020 (aged 74)

Sport
- Sport: Rowing

Walter Steiner (10 September 1946 – 5 December 2020) was a Swiss rower. He competed in the men's coxless four event at the 1972 Summer Olympics.
