= Charlie Butt =

American rowing coach

Charles Stahley Butt Jr. (1919–1992) was a high school rowing coach in Northern Virginia, United States, who was also involved in promoting the growth of school rowing in the Washington D.C. area and the United States.

== Life and career ==
Butt graduated with a degree in aeronautical engineering from Massachusetts Institute of Technology in 1941, where he was involved in varsity rowing. After graduation he moved to Northern Virginia. In 1949, he approached the administration at Washington-Lee High School, offering to start a rowing team. In their first season the team won the three most prestigious championships in the area: the Northern Virginia Championships, the Stotesbury Cup, and the National Schoolboy Championships held in Detroit, Michigan.

Butt was head coach of Washington-Lee High School's Crew program in Arlington, Virginia for 41 years. He organised numerous rowing programs in the area, both scholastic and collegiate, and coached while working full-time for the Department of Defense as an Aeronautical Engineer.

He coached the W-L Varsity Eight to win the Princess Elizabeth Challenge Cup (PE) at the Henley Royal Regatta in Henley-on-Thames, England, in 1964, the first year the PE was opened to foreign crews. Two years earlier, the crew had made the semi-finals of the regatta's Thames Challenge Cup against an international field. Since rowing was only a club sport at Washington-Lee, a public high school, most of the money was raised locally to take the crew and equipment to England. In 1969 the school won the Princess Elizabeth Cup a second time.

Over the years, Washington-Lee also won 19 scholastic National titles and numerous Stotesbury Cup and Northern Virginia Championships. Butt coached several Olympians, including Tony Johnson, Sean Hall, E. Fredrick Borchelt (1984), and Walter Lubsen (1984). On six occasions (1967, 1971, 1977, 1978, 1980, and 1981), Butt was the coach of the US Junior World Championship team, reaching a high place of 8th in 1980 in Hazewinkel, Belgium.

Butt also spent many summers and falls coaching rowers at Potomac Boat Club (PBC). Between 1961 and 1980 Charlie hosted and coached boats comprising parts of the Junior Men's National Team, rowing out of PBC. He also helped create the Sandy Run Regional Park rowing facility on the Occoquan River in Fairfax Station, Virginia, and consulted on the development of Thompson Boat Center, a public rowing facility in Washington, DC, located near the Kennedy Center.

== Personal life ==
Charlie was married to Mildred Martin, a gym teacher at Washington-Lee from North Carolina. They lived in McLean, Virginia, and had five children: Susan, Sarah, Janie, Nancy and Charles III.. His son, Charles III ("Charley") is a leading rowing coach and presently the Bolles-Parker Head Coach for Harvard Men's Heavyweight Crew.

In 1990, Butt was diagnosed with acute leukemia. He continued to coach into the fall of 1991, and died in Spring of 1992. A Charlie Butt Trophy is awarded to Boys JV8 at the Stotesbury Cup Regatta in May. A Charlie Butt Regatta is held each spring on the Potomac River for scholastic crews.

== Honors and awards ==
- 1964 Arlington Sports Hall of Fame
- 1981 U.S. Rowing Association's John Carlin Service Award
- 1987 U.S. Rowing Association's Jack Kelly Award
- 1979 & 1980 Washingtonian magazine "Washingtonian of the Year"
- 1987 & 1989, The Washington Post "All-Met Men's Rowing Coach"
- Virginia Athletic Directors, Administrators, and Coaches Association Award
