= Ib Larsen =

Danish rower (born 1945)

Personal information
- Born: 1 April 1945 (age 81) Kongens Lyngby

Sport
- Sport: Rowing
Medal record
Men's rowing
Bronze medal – third place	1968 Mexico City	Coxless pair
European Rowing Championships
Bronze medal – third place	1969 Klagenfurt	Coxless pair

Ib Ivan Larsen (born 1 April 1945) is a Danish rower who competed in the 1968 Summer Olympics.

He was born in Kongens Lyngby.

In 1964 he was a crew member of the Danish boat which won the bronze medal in the coxless pairs competition.
