= José Luis Morales (rower) =

Mexican rower (born 1950)

Personal information
- Nationality: Mexican
- Born: 2 October 1950 (age 74)

Sport
- Sport: Rowing

José Luis Morales (born 2 October 1950) is a Mexican rower. He competed in the men's coxless four event at the 1972 Summer Olympics.
