= John Ulinder =

Canadian rower

Personal information
- Nationality: Canadian
- Born: 27 July 1943 (age 81); Ladysmith, British Columbia, Canada

Sport
- Sport: Rowing

John Ulinder (born 27 July 1943) is a Canadian rower. He competed in the men's coxless pair event at the 1968 Summer Olympics.
