= Hans-Jörg Bendiner =

Swiss rower

Personal information
- Nationality: Swiss
- Born: 11 January 1949 (age 76)

Sport
- Sport: Rowing

Hans-Jörg Bendiner (born 11 January 1949) is a Swiss rower. He competed in the men's coxless four event at the 1972 Summer Olympics.
