= Esteban Masseilot =

Uruguayan rower

Personal information
- Born: 19 June 1942 (age 82); Paysandú, Uruguay

Sport
- Sport: Rowing

Esteban Masseilot (born 19 June 1942) is a Uruguayan rower. He competed in the men's coxless pair event at the 1968 Summer Olympics.
