= Roger Rouver =

French rower

Personal information
- Nationality: French
- Born: 26 July 1946 (age 78)

Sport
- Sport: Rowing

Roger Rouver (born 26 July 1946) is a French rower. He competed in the men's coxless four event at the 1972 Summer Olympics.
