= Borislav Vasilev =

Bulgarian rower

Personal information
- Nationality: Bulgarian
- Born: 15 August 1951 (age 73); Sofia, Bulgaria

Sport
- Sport: Rowing

Borislav Vasilev (Bulgarian: Борислав Василев; born 15 August 1951) is a Bulgarian rower. He competed in the men's coxless four event at the 1972 Summer Olympics.
