= Fred Rüssli =

Swiss rower

Personal information
- Nationality: Swiss
- Born: 3 June 1942 (age 82); Zürich, Switzerland

Sport
- Sport: Rowing

Fred Rüssli was born on 3 June 1942 and is a Swiss rower. He competed in the men's coxless pair event at the 1968 Summer Olympics.
