= Kim Ki-tae (rower) =

North Korean rower (born 1952)

Personal information
- Native name: 김기태
- Nationality: North Korean
- Born: 14 November 1952 (age 72)

Sport
- Sport: Rowing

Kim Ki-tae (born 14 November 1952) is a North Korean rower. He competed in the men's coxless four event at the 1972 Summer Olympics.
