= Larry Hough =

American rower

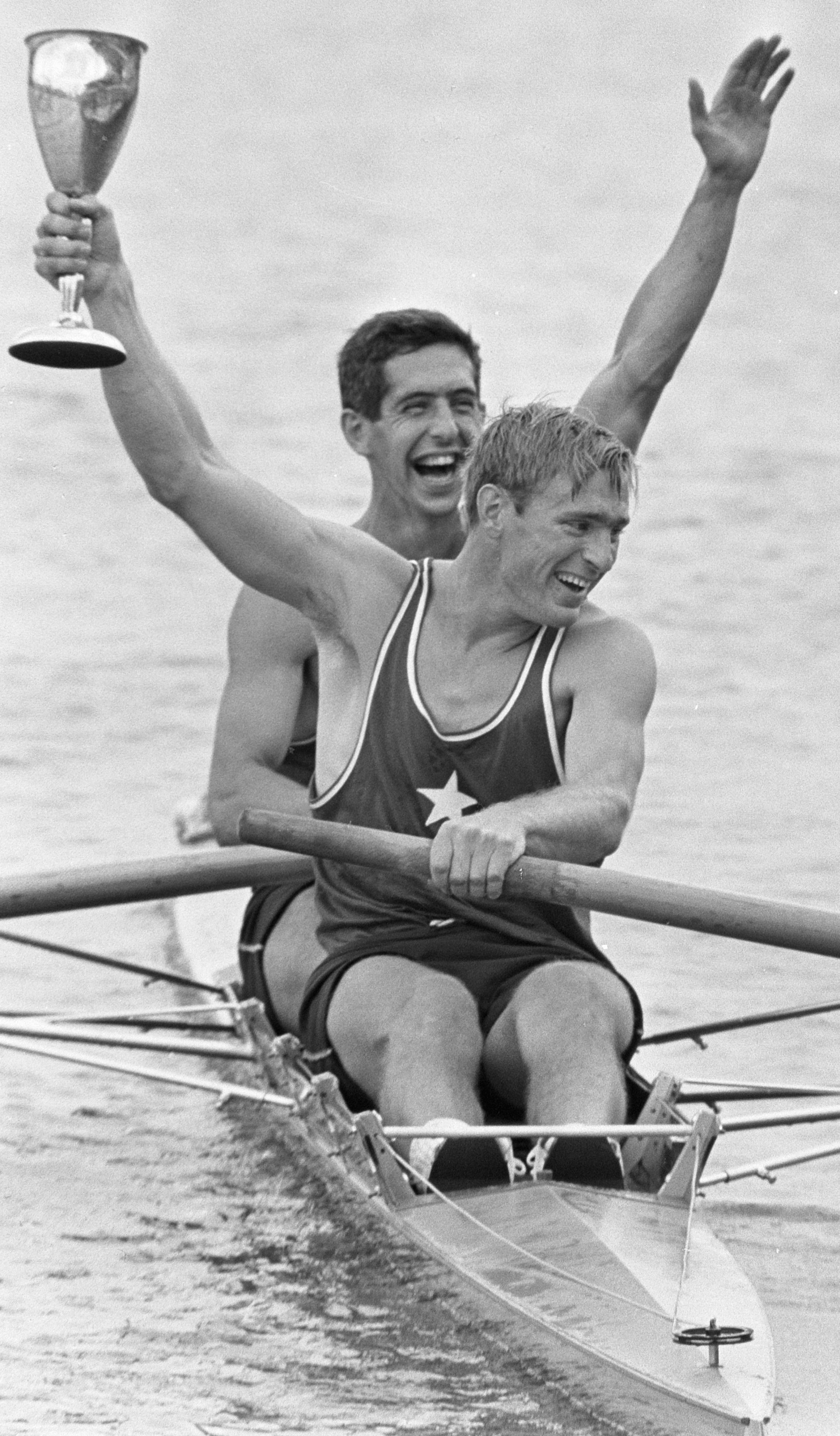
- Johnson and Hough (right) in 1968

Personal information
- Born: Lawrence Alan Hough; April 4, 1944 (age 82) Janesville, Wisconsin, U.S.
- Height: 191 cm (6 ft 3 in)
- Weight: 86 kg (190 lb)

Sport
- Sport: Rowing
- Club: Potomac Boat Club
Medal record
Representing United States
Olympic Games
Silver medal – second place	1968 Mexico City	Coxless pair
Pan American Games
Gold medal – first place	1967 Winnipeg	Coxless pair
European Rowing Championships
Gold medal – first place	1967 Vichy	Coxless pair
Gold medal – first place	1969 Klagenfurt	Coxless pair

Lawrence Alan Hough (born April 4, 1944) is a retired American rower. He competed in coxless pairs at the 1968 and 1972 Olympics and won a silver medal in 1968.

After graduating from Stanford University in 1966, Hough teamed with Tony Johnson. In 1967 they won the U.S., North American, Pan American, and European championships. Next year they won the national title and placed second at the 1968 Olympics. In 1969 they won another European title.

At the 1972 Olympics Johnson served as a coach, while Hough rowed with Dick Lyon; they placed ninth.
