= Biser Boyadzhiev =

Bulgarian rower (born 1948)

Personal information
- Nationality: Bulgarian
- Born: 31 October 1948 (age 76); Plovdiv, Bulgaria

Sport
- Sport: Rowing

Biser Boyadzhiev (Bulgarian: Бисер Бояджиев; born 31 October 1948) is a Bulgarian rower. He competed in the men's coxless four event at the 1972 Summer Olympics.
