= Kurt Baumann =

Swiss rower

Personal information
- Nationality: Swiss
- Born: 25 May 1945 (age 79)

Sport
- Sport: Rowing

Kurt Baumann (born 25 May 1945) is a Swiss rower. He competed in the men's coxless four event at the 1972 Summer Olympics.
