= Lyle Gatley =

Canadian rower (born 1945)

Personal information
- Nationality: Canadian
- Born: 22 September 1945 (age 79); Vancouver, British Columbia, Canada

Sport
- Sport: Rowing

Lyle Gatley (born 22 September 1945) is a Canadian rower. He competed in the men's coxless pair event at the 1968 Summer Olympics.
