= Arturo Figueroa =

Mexican rower (born 1949)

Personal information
- Nationality: Mexican
- Born: 1 June 1949 (age 75)

Sport
- Sport: Rowing

Arturo Figueroa (born 1 June 1949) is a Mexican rower. He competed in the men's coxless four event at the 1972 Summer Olympics.
