= Angelo Rossetto =

Italian rower (1946–2022)

Personal information
- Nationality: Italian
- Born: 11 March 1946; Latina, Italy
- Died: 14 January 2022 (aged 75); Silea, Italy

Sport
- Sport: Rowing

Angelo Rossetto (11 March 1946 – 14 January 2022) was an Italian rower. He competed in the men's coxless four event at the 1972 Summer Olympics. Rossetto died in Silea on 14 January 2022, at the age of 75.
