= Joachim Ehrig =

German rower (born 1947)

Personal information
- Born: 21 February 1947 (age 79) Heidelberg, Germany
- Height: 1.91 m (6 ft 3 in)
- Weight: 90 kg (200 lb)

Sport
- Sport: Rowing
- Club: Ruderriege Etuf Essen
Medal record
Men's rowing
Representing West Germany
Olympic Games
Bronze medal – third place	1972 Munich	Coxless four
World Rowing Championships
Silver medal – second place	1970 St. Catharines	Coxless four
European Rowing Championships
Bronze medal – third place	1971 Copenhagen	Coxless four

Joachim Werner Ehrig (born 21 February 1947) is a German retired rower who specialized in the coxless fours. He won a silver medal in the event at the 1970 World Rowing Championships and bronze medals at the 1971 European Championships and 1972 Summer Olympics.

In recognition of his Olympic achievement, Ehrig was awarded the Silver Bay Leaf, Germany's highest sports honor. Domestically, he won three West German national titles, underscoring his prominence in the national rowing scene
