= Miloš Janša =

Slovenian rower

Personal information
- Nationality: Slovenian
- Born: 5 April 1950 (age 74); Bled, Yugoslavia

Sport
- Sport: Rowing

Miloš Janša (born 5 April 1950) is a Slovenian rower. He competed in the men's coxless four event at the 1972 Summer Olympics.
