= Marino Specia =

Italian rower (1943–2025)

Personal information
- Nationality: Italian
- Born: 16 September 1943 Trieste, Italy
- Died: 4 November 2025 (aged 82)

Sport
- Sport: Rowing

Marino Specia (16 September 1943 – 4 November 2025) was an Italian rower. He competed in the men's coxless pair event at the 1968 Summer Olympics. Specia died on 4 November 2025, at the age of 82.
