= Svein Erik Nilsen =

Norwegian rower

Personal information
- Nationality: Norwegian
- Born: 25 July 1944 (age 80)

Sport
- Sport: Rowing

Svein Erik Nilsen (born 25 July 1944) is a Norwegian rower. He competed in the men's coxless four event at the 1972 Summer Olympics.
