= Willy Poulsen =

Danish rower

Personal information
- Nationality: Danish
- Born: 21 December 1946 (age 78); Copenhagen, Denmark

Sport
- Sport: Rowing

Willy Poulsen (born 21 December 1946) is a Danish rower. He competed in the men's coxless four event at the 1972 Summer Olympics.
