= Egon Pedersen =

Danish rower

Personal information
- Nationality: Danish
- Born: 20 April 1946 (age 78); Copenhagen, Denmark

Sport
- Sport: Rowing

Egon Pedersen (born 20 April 1946) is a Danish rower. He competed in the men's coxless four event at the 1972 Summer Olympics.
