= Mihai Naumencu =

Romanian rower

Personal information
- Nationality: Romanian
- Born: 4 October 1945 (age 79)

Sport
- Sport: Rowing

Mihai Naumencu (born 4 October 1945) is a Romanian rower. He competed in the men's coxless four event at the 1972 Summer Olympics.
