= Hans-Joachim Puls =

German rower

Sport
- Sport: Rowing
- Club: SV Dynamo
Medal record
Men's rowing
Representing East Germany
World Rowing Championships
Gold medal – first place	1970 St. Catharines	Eight
European Rowing Championships
Silver medal – second place	1971 Copenhagen	Eight

Hans-Joachim Puls is a German rower for SV Dynamo who won a gold medal at the 1970 European Rowing Championships and a silver in 1971.
