= Charles Hewitt (rower) =

American rower (born 1949)

Personal information
- Born: November 23, 1949 (age 75); Boston, Massachusetts, U.S.

Sport
- Sport: Rowing

Charles Hewitt (born November 23, 1949) is an American former rower and reinsurance broker. He competed in the men's coxless four event at the 1972 Summer Olympics. He graduated from Harvard University and Wharton School of Business.

== Biography ==
Hewitt was a member of the Harvard Hall of Fame 1971 lightweight crew, dubbed "Superboat" and described by preeminent American rowing coach Harry Parker as "arguably the fastest lightweight varsity crew of all time at Harvard or elsewhere". In 1971, this crew defeated the Kingston Rowing Club to clinch the Thames Challenge Cup at the Henley Royal Regatta, Henley-on-the-Thames, England.

Hewitt was recruited out of the Vesper Boat Club in Philadelphia to compete for and earn a place on the 1972 Olympic team.

Upon completion of his MBA at Wharton, Hewitt worked in banking before moving into the insurance and eventually the reinsurance industry. As a partner at E.W. Blanch and in the wake of Hurricane Andrew, he was among an elite group of brokers that exponentially grew the reinsurance industry in the United States over the following decades.

Hewitt currently serves as a trustee of the Insurance Library of Boston, Crossroads Youth Empowerment Summer Camps, The Beth Israel Deaconess Hospital, a member of the Board of Directors of the Pioneer Institute, and a Corporator of Northeastern University.

He also coaches crew for Duxbury High School and the Duxbury Bay Maritime School on the South Shore of Massachusetts.
