= Nikolay Kolev (rower, born 1950) =

Bulgarian rower

Personal information
- Nationality: Bulgarian
- Born: 1 March 1950 (age 75); Sofia, Bulgaria

Sport
- Sport: Rowing

Nikolay Kolev (born 1 March 1950) is a Bulgarian rower. He competed in the men's coxless four event at the 1972 Summer Olympics.
