= Werner Zwimpfer =

Swiss rower

Personal information
- Nationality: Swiss
- Born: 21 April 1944 (age 80); Lucerne, Switzerland

Sport
- Sport: Rowing

Werner Zwimpfer (born 21 April 1944) is a Swiss rower. He competed with Fred Rüssli in the men's coxless pair event at the 1968 Summer Olympics. The pair came 5th in the final with a time of 7.46.79.

Events		Position	Result	
Mexico City 1968 - Rowing
Pair without coxswain M	Final	5	7.46.79	
	Semifinal	3	7.16.09	Q
	Repechage	1	7.26.33	Q
	Round 1	4	7.36.91	
