= Thomas Macher =

Swiss rower

Personal information
- Nationality: Swiss
- Born: 21 February 1947
- Died: 13 October 2025 (aged 78)

Sport
- Sport: Rowing

Thomas Macher (21 February 1947 – 13 October 2025) was a Swiss rower. He competed in the men's coxless four event at the 1972 Summer Olympics.
