= Gregory Rokosh =

Canadian rower

Personal information
- Born: 24 January 1942 (age 83); Flin Flon, Manitoba, Canada

Sport
- Sport: Rowing

Gregory Rokosh (born 24 January 1942) is a Canadian rower. He competed in the men's coxless four event at the 1972 Summer Olympics.
