= Hong Song-su =

North Korean rower (born 1953)

Personal information
- Native name: 홍성수
- Nationality: North Korean
- Born: 15 April 1953 (age 71)

Sport
- Sport: Rowing

Hong Song-su is a North Korean rower, born on 15 April 1953. He competed in the men's coxless four event at the 1972 Summer Olympics.
