= Kim Un-son =

North Korean rower (born 1954)

Personal information
- Nationality: North Korean
- Born: 11 October 1954 (age 70)

Sport
- Sport: Rowing

Kim Un-son (born 11 October 1954) is a North Korean rower. He competed in the men's coxless four event at the 1972 Summer Olympics.
