= Angel Serra =

Cuban rower

Personal information
- Nationality: Cuban
- Born: 2 October 1951 (age 73)

Sport
- Sport: Rowing

Angel Serra (born 2 October 1951) is a Cuban rower. He competed in the men's coxless four event at the 1972 Summer Olympics.
