= Wolfgang Plottke =

German rower (1948–2024)

Personal information
- Born: 31 July 1948 Klein Lukow, Allied-occupied Germany
- Died: 21 March 2024 (aged 75)

Sport
- Sport: Rowing
Medal record
Men's rowing
Representing West Germany
Olympic Games
Bronze medal – third place	1972 Munich	Coxless four
World Rowing Championships
Silver medal – second place	1970 St. Catharines	Coxless four
European Rowing Championships
Bronze medal – third place	1971 Copenhagen	Coxless four

Wolfgang Plottke (31 July 1948 – 21 March 2024) was a German rower who competed for West Germany in the 1972 Summer Olympics.

== Biography ==
Plottke was born in Klein Lukow on 31 July 1948. He competed at the 1970 World Rowing Championships in St. Catharines in the coxless four and won silver. He competed at the 1971 European Rowing Championships and won a bronze medal with the coxless four. At the 1972 Summer Olympics in Munich, he was a crew member of the West German boat that won the bronze medal in the coxless four event.

Plottke died on 21 March 2024, at the age of 75.
