= Tony Johnson (rower) =

American rower (born 1940)

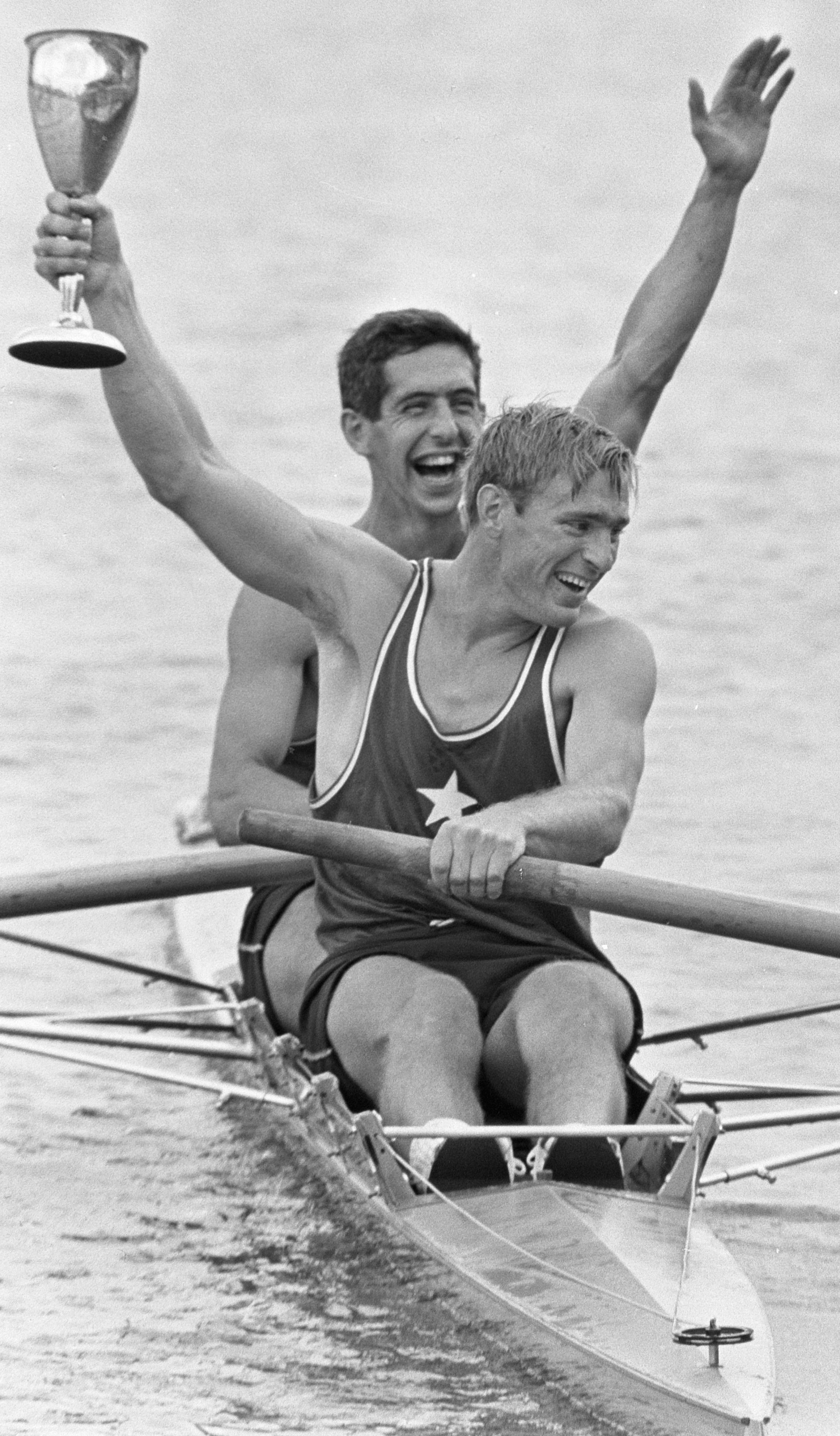
- Johnson (left) and Hough in 1968

Personal information
- Full name: Philip Anthony Johnson
- Born: November 16, 1940 (age 85) Washington, D.C., U.S.
- Height: 191 cm (6 ft 3 in)
- Weight: 86 kg (190 lb)

Sport
- Sport: Rowing
- Club: Potomac Boat Club
Medal record
Representing the United States
Olympic Games
Silver medal – second place	1968 Mexico City	Coxless pair
Pan American Games
Gold medal – first place	1967 Winnipeg	Coxless pair
European Rowing Championships
Bronze medal – third place	1965 Duisburg	Eight
Gold medal – first place	1967 Vichy	Coxless pair
Gold medal – first place	1969 Klagenfurt	Coxless pair

Philip Anthony Johnson (born November 16, 1940) is a retired American rower. He competed in coxless pairs at the 1964 and 1968 Olympics and won a silver medal in 1968.

Johnson was born in Arlington, VA, and began his rowing career under the legendary Charlie Butt at Washington-Lee High School, where he was in the class of 1958. With Washington-Lee, he was on the first American public high school crew to row at Henley Royal Regatta in England in 1958. He continued to row at Syracuse University and the Potomac Boat Club.

At the 1964 Summer Olympics, he placed tenth in the pair together with James Edmonds. His breakthrough came in 1967, when, together with Larry Hough, he won the Pan American Games, the National Championship, the North American Championship, and the European Championship. Next year they placed second at the 1968 Olympics, and in 1969 won another European title.

Johnson graduated from Syracuse University, and in 1972 served as an assistant U.S. Olympic rowing coach; he later prepared the national team to the 1975 and 1985 world championships. From 1989 to 2014 he directed the rowing program at Georgetown University. After the 2013–2014 season, Johnson was appointed Coach Emeritus. He first coached the Georgetown crew from 1967 to 1969 before moving to Yale University for 20 years. In developing the sport of rowing at Georgetown, Johnson oversaw significant growth of the program starting as the only full-time coach in 1989 to overseeing a team of eight coaching staff with four varsity and four novice teams. Georgetown competes both as a member of the Eastern Association of Rowing Colleges and in the Eastern Association of Women's Rowing Colleges. Johnson returned to Georgetown in 2022 to coach the men's heavyweight squad.
