= Jure Potočnik =

Slovenian rower

Personal information
- Nationality: Slovenian
- Born: 2 July 1949 (age 75); Bled, Yugoslavia

Sport
- Sport: Rowing

Jure Potočnik (born 2 July 1949) is a Slovenian rower. He competed in the men's coxless four event at the 1972 Summer Olympics.
