= Ennio Fermo =

Italian rower

Personal information
- Nationality: Italian
- Born: 8 May 1946 (age 78); Trieste, Italy

Sport
- Sport: Rowing

Ennio Fermo (born 8 May 1946) is an Italian rower. He competed in the men's coxless pair event at the 1968 Summer Olympics.
