= Adalbert Agh =

Romanian rower

Personal information
- Nationality: Romanian
- Born: 3 December 1945 (age 79); Oradea, Romania

Sport
- Sport: Rowing

Adalbert Agh (born 3 December 1945) is a Romanian rower. He competed in the men's coxless four event at the 1972 Summer Olympics.
