= Potomac Boat Club =

- U.S. National Register of Historic Places
- D.C. Inventory of Historic Sites
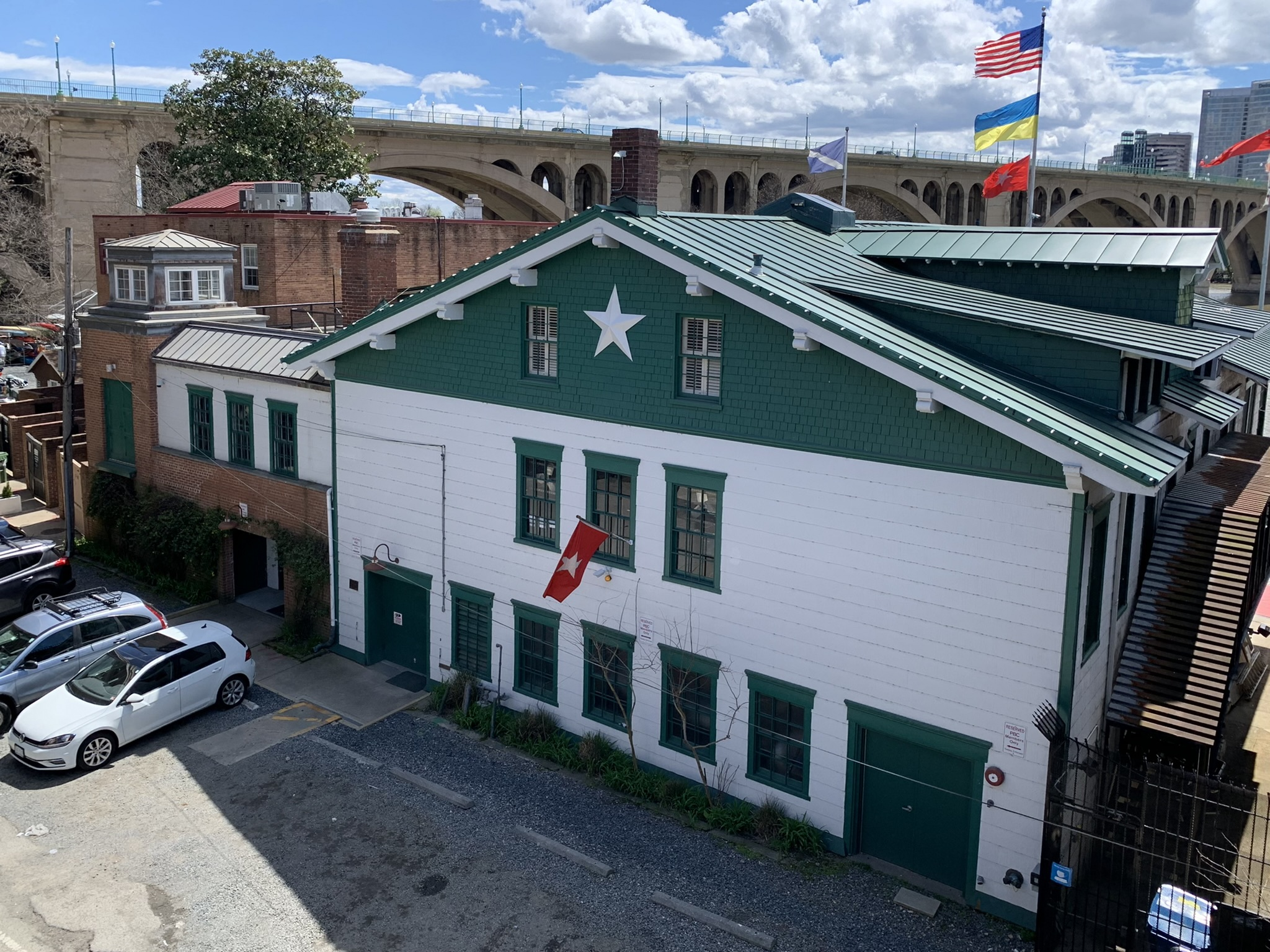
- Potomac Boat Club in 2022

- Location within Washington, D.C.
- Location: 3530 Water St., NW., Washington, District of Columbia
- Coordinates: 38°54′15″N 77°4′14″W
- Area: less than one acre
- Built: 1908; 118 years ago
- Architect: Mullet, A.B., & Co.; Cassidy, Charles J.
- Architectural style: Bungalow/American Craftsman
- NRHP reference No.: 91000786

Significant dates
- Added to NRHP: June 27, 1991
- Designated DCIHS: January 23, 1973

The Potomac Boat Club is a rowing club on the Potomac River in Washington, DC. It was established in 1869 (157 years ago), originally as the Potomac Barge Club. The club provides a rowing hub for around 300 senior members, ranging in ability from recreational rowers to professional athletes.

The boat club hosts both private members, as well serving as a base for the Washington-Liberty High School crew team.

== Boathouse ==
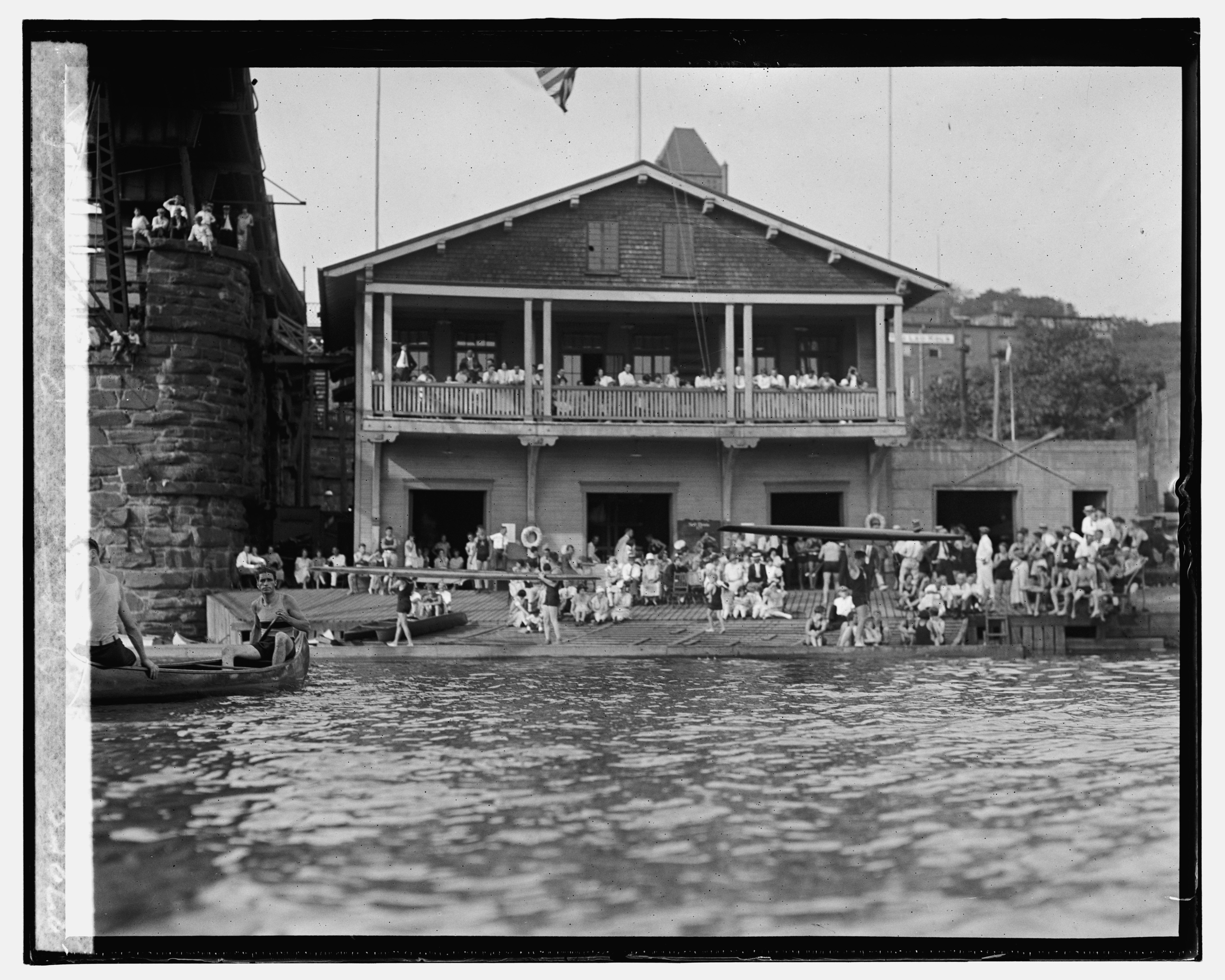
Potomac Boat Club from the Potomac River, 1925

The club’s current building, a two-story, wooden, craftsman style structure completed in 1908, was listed on the National Register of Historic Places in 1991

The facade of the club faces the Potomac River. The rear elevation faces K Street, which terminates at the Club. The first floor of the building is used for boat and oar storage. The second floor of the original building is broken into a ballroom, board room, and locker rooms. The second floor of the addition is used for additional locker rooms and a shop. The building was rehabilitated by Williams & Dynerman in 1989.

Adjacent to the boathouse, the remaining abutment of the demolished Aqueduct Bridge provides shelter for rowing shells belonging to members of the club.

== Notable club coaches and rowers ==
The history of the club is linked with a number of high profile coaches and athletes who have made significant contributions to the sport of competitive rowing. Charles E. Courtney served as club coach between 1881 and 1885, a controversial professional athlete, but later coach of the Cornell University’s men’s crew team that dominated the early years of competitive rowing in the Intercollegiate Rowing Association. Many decades later, Charlie Butt, head coach of the storied Washington-Liberty High School crew team was instrumental in promoting rowing as a school sport. The Charlie Butt Scullers’ Head of the Potomac Regatta continues to be held annually on the Potomac River for scholastic crews.

Potomac Boat Club members Larry Hough and Tony Johnson, won the silver medal in coxless pairs at the 1968 Olympics.

== See also ==
- National Register of Historic Places listings in Washington, D.C.
