= Apolinaras Grigas =

Soviet rower

Personal information
- Born: 3 September 1945 (age 80) Kaunas, Lithuanian SSR, Soviet Union
- Height: 183 cm (6 ft 0 in)
- Weight: 80 kg (176 lb)

Sport
- Sport: Rowing
Medal record
Men's rowing
Representing the Soviet Union
European Rowing Championships
Silver medal – second place	1967 Vichy	Eight
Bronze medal – third place	1971 Copenhagen	Eight
Silver medal – second place	1973 Moscow	Coxless four

Apolinaras Grigas (Russian: Аполинарас Григас; born 3 September 1945) is a Lithuanian rower who competed for the Soviet Union.

Grigas was born in Kaunas, Lithuania. At the 1967 European Rowing Championships in Vichy, he won silver with the men's eight. He competed at the 1968 Summer Olympics in Mexico City with the men's coxless pair where they did not finish in the round one repêchage. At the 1971 European Rowing Championships in Copenhagen, he won bronze with the men's eight. At the 1973 European Rowing Championships in Moscow, he won silver with the men's coxless four.
