= Metodi Khalvadzhiski =

Bulgarian rower

Personal information
- Nationality: Bulgarian
- Born: 26 April 1949 (age 75); Sofia, Bulgaria

Sport
- Sport: Rowing

Metodi Khalvadzhiski (Bulgarian: Методи Халваджийски, born 26 April 1949) is a Bulgarian rower. He competed in the men's coxless four event at the 1972 Summer Olympics.
