= José Sigot =

Uruguayan rower

Personal information
- Born: 2 May 1937 (age 87); Paysandú, Uruguay

Sport
- Sport: Rowing

José Sigot (born 2 May 1937) is a Uruguayan rower. He competed in the men's coxless pair event at the 1968 Summer Olympics.
