= Juan López (rower) =

Mexican rower (born 1949)

Personal information
- Nationality: Mexican
- Born: 15 July 1949 (age 75)

Sport
- Sport: Rowing

Juan López (born 15 July 1949) is a Mexican rower. He competed in the men's coxless four event at the 1972 Summer Olympics.
