= Noel Mills =

New Zealand rower (1944–2004)

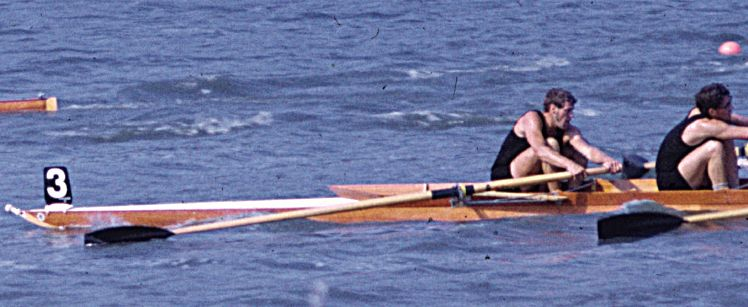
- Mills (bow) and Ross Collinge (seat 2) at the 1971 European Rowing Championships

Personal information
- Born: Noel Edward Mills; 13 January 1944 Auckland, New Zealand
- Died: 8 December 2004 (aged 60)
- Height: 188 cm (6 ft 2 in)

Sport
- Sport: Rowing
- Club: Whakatane Rowing Club
Medal record
Representing New Zealand
Men's rowing
Summer Olympics
Silver medal – second place	1972 Munich	Coxless four
World Rowing Championships
Bronze medal – third place	1978 Karapiro	Eight
European Rowing Championships
Silver medal – second place	1973 Moscow	Coxless pair

Noel Edward Mills (13 January 1944 – 8 December 2004) was a New Zealand rower who won an Olympic silver medal at 1972 Summer Olympics in Munich, Germany.

Mills was born in 1944 in Auckland, New Zealand. He teamed with Dick Tonks, Dudley Storey and Ross Collinge to win the silver medal in the Coxless four at the 1972 Olympics in Munich, Germany. In the following year, he won a silver medal at the European Rowing Championships in Moscow, Soviet Union, in the men's pair with Wybo Veldman. He won a bronze medal in the men's eight at the 1978 World Rowing Championships at Lake Karapiro, New Zealand. After retiring from international rowing, Mills coached at his Whakatane Rowing Club for many years. He moved to Brisbane, Australia in the late 1990s and worked in a property development company with his nephew.

Mills died on 8 December 2004.
