= William Miller (rower, born 1947) =

American rower

Personal information
- Born: March 12, 1947 (age 79) Brockton, Massachusetts, United States

Sport
- Sport: Rowing

William Miller (born March 12, 1947) is an American rower. He competed in the men's coxless four event at the 1972 Summer Olympics.
