= Graeme McIntyre =

New Zealand sports shooter

Personal information
- Born: 12 October 1940 (age 86) Hastings, New Zealand

Sport
- Sport: Sports shooting

Graeme McIntyre (born 12 October 1940) is a New Zealand former sports shooter. He competed at the 1972 Summer Olympics and the 1976 Summer Olympics.
