= Donald Curphey =

Canadian rower

Personal information
- Born: 3 February 1948 (age 77) Toronto, Ontario, Canada

Sport
- Sport: Rowing

Donald Curphey (born 3 February 1948) is a Canadian rower. He competed in the men's coxless four event at the 1972 Summer Olympics. Donald Curphey is now a retired Olympic rower, who spent many years as a highschool science teacher.
