= Manfred Schneider =

German rower (born 1941)

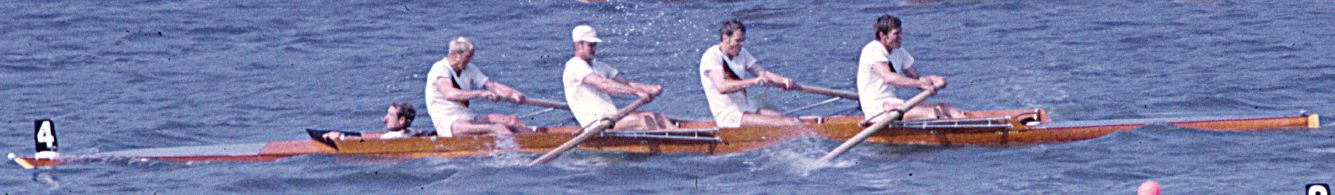
- At the 1971 European Rowing Championships, with Schneider in seat 2

Personal information
- Born: 9 October 1941 (age 84) Schwerin, Mecklenburg-Vorpommern, Germany

Sport
- Sport: Rowing
Medal record
Representing East Germany
Rowing at the Summer Olympics
Bronze medal – third place	1972 Munich	Eight
European Rowing Championships
Silver medal – second place	1971 Copenhagen	Coxed four

Manfred Schneider (born 9 October 1941) is a German rower, who competed for the SC Dynamo Berlin / Sportvereinigung (SV) Dynamo. He won medals at various international rowing competitions.
