= Karel Jonker =

Canadian rower

Personal information
- Full name: Karel Anton Johan
- Nationality: Canadian
- Born: 5 July 1949 (age 76) Amsterdam, Netherlands

Sport
- Sport: Rowing

Karel Jonker (born 5 July 1949) is a Canadian rower. He competed in the men's coxless four event at the 1972 Summer Olympics.
