= Jean-Pierre Drivet =

French rower

Personal information
- Nationality: French
- Born: 2 April 1942; Chambéry, France
- Died: 21 September 2004 (aged 62); Annecy, France

Sport
- Sport: Rowing

Jean-Pierre Stephane Drivet (2 April 1942 – 21 September 2004) was a French rower. He competed at the 1964 Summer Olympics and the 1968 Summer Olympics.
