= Rolf Andersen (rower) =

Danish rower (born 1945)

Personal information
- Nationality: Danish
- Born: 13 June 1945 (age 79); Aarhus, Denmark

Sport
- Sport: Rowing

Rolf Andersen (born 13 June 1945) is a Danish rower. He competed in the men's coxless four event at the 1972 Summer Olympics.
