= Troadio Delgado =

Cuban rower

Personal information
- Nationality: Cuban
- Born: 28 December 1949 (age 75)

Sport
- Sport: Rowing

Troadio Delgado (born 28 December 1949) is a Cuban rower. He competed in the men's coxless four event at the 1972 Summer Olympics.
