= Gérard Chenuet =

French rower

Personal information
- Nationality: French
- Born: 18 January 1945 (age 80)

Sport
- Sport: Rowing
- Club: Société d'Encouragement du Sport Nautique

Gérard Chenuet (born 18 January 1945) is a French rower. He competed in the men's coxless four event at the 1972 Summer Olympics.
