= Peter Funnekötter =

West German rower (born 1946)

Personal information
- Born: 11 June 1946 (age 80) Münster
- Height: 190 cm (6 ft 3 in)
- Weight: 89 kg (196 lb)

Sport
- Sport: Rowing
- Club: ARV Westfalen
Medal record
Men's rowing
Representing West Germany
Olympic Games
Bronze medal – third place	1972 Munich	Coxless four
World Rowing Championships
Silver medal – second place	1970 St. Catharines	Coxless four
European Rowing Championships
Bronze medal – third place	1971 Copenhagen	Coxless four

Peter Funnekötter (born 11 June 1946) is a German rower who competed for West Germany in the 1972 Summer Olympics.

He was born in Münster. He competed at the 1970 World Rowing Championships in St. Catharines in the coxless four and won silver. He competed at the 1971 European Rowing Championships and won a bronze medal with the coxless four. In 1972 he was a crew member of the West German boat that won the bronze medal in the coxless four event.
