= László Romvári =

Hungarian rower

Personal information
- Nationality: Hungarian
- Born: 27 May 1943 (age 82) Szeged, Hungary

Sport
- Sport: Rowing

László Romvári (born 27 May 1943) is a Hungarian rower. He competed at the 1968 Summer Olympics and the 1972 Summer Olympics.
