= Luciano Wilk =

Argentine rower

Personal information
- Nationality: Argentine
- Born: 24 July 1951 (age 74)

Sport
- Sport: Rowing

Luciano Wilk (born 24 July 1951) is an Argentine rower. He competed in the men's coxless four event at the 1972 Summer Olympics.
