= Harold Dimke =

German rower

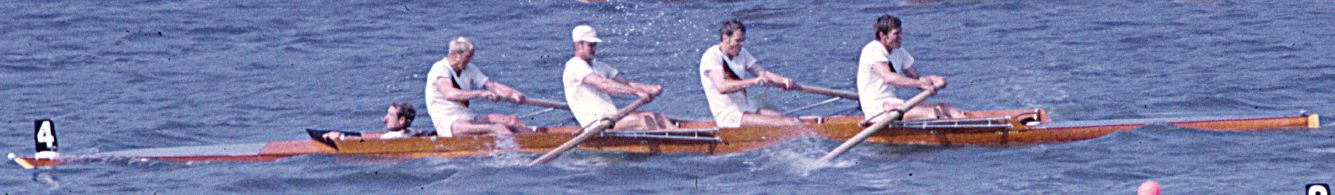
- At the 1971 European Rowing Championships, with Dimke in the bow seat

Personal information
- Born: 21 November 1949 (age 76) Berlin

Sport
- Sport: Rowing
- Club: SC Dynamo Berlin
Medal record
Representing East Germany
Rowing at the Summer Olympics
Bronze medal – third place	1972 München	Eight
European Rowing Championships
Silver medal – second place	1971 Copenhagen	Coxed four

Harold Dimke (born 21 November 1949) is a German rower who competed for SC Dynamo Berlin. He won medals at international rowing competitions.
