= Oscar de Andrés =

Argentine rower

Personal information
- Nationality: Argentine
- Born: 16 July 1944 (age 81)

Sport
- Sport: Rowing

Oscar de Andrés (born 16 July 1944) is an Argentine rower. He competed in the men's coxless four event at the 1972 Summer Olympics.
