= 1971 European Rowing Championships =

International rowing event

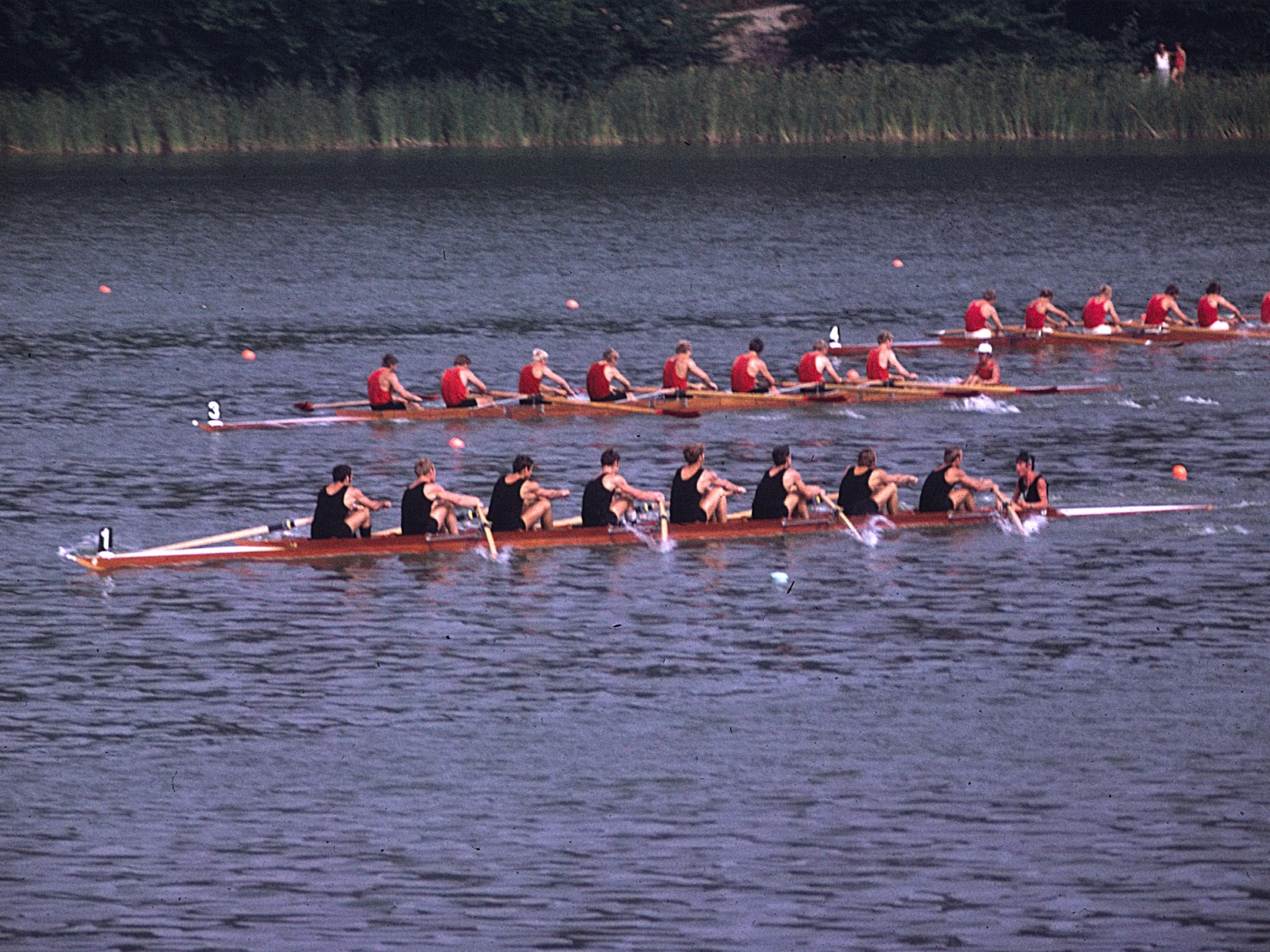
- 1971 M8+ semifinal, showing New Zealand (front), the Soviet Union, and Czechoslovakia
- Venue: Lake Bagsværd
- Location: Copenhagen, Denmark
- Dates: 12–15 August 1971 (women); 18–25 August 1971 (men)
- Nations: 17 (women) and 27 (men)

The 1971 European Rowing Championships were rowing championships held on Lake Bagsværd in the Danish capital Copenhagen. There were seven competitions for men and five for women, and the most successful nation was East Germany with five gold medals across the twelve boat classes. As World Rowing Championships were still held at four-year intervals at the time, the European Rowing Championships were open to nations outside of Europe and had become to be regarded as quasi-world championships. Men competed in all seven Olympic boat classes (M1x: 17 boats; M2x: 16 boats; M2-: 13 boats; M2+: 20 boats; M4-: 15 boats; M4+: 18 boats; M8+: 16 boats), and 120 boats were entered in total.

The women's championships were held from 12 to 15 August, and 49 boats were entered from 17 countries. The men's championships were held shortly afterwards, from 18 to 25 August. The men entered 116 boats from 27 countries.

== Medal summary ==
Medallists at the 1971 European Rowing Championships were:

=== Women's events ===
| Event | Gold | | Silver | | Bronze | |
|---|---|---|---|---|---|---|
| Event | Country & rowers | Time | Country & rowers | Time | Country & rowers | Time |
| W1x | East Germany; Anita Kuhlke | 4:30.75 | France; Annick Anthoine | 4:34.66 | West Germany; Edith Eckbauer | 4:35.03 |
| W2x | Soviet Union; Elena Kondrashina; Galina Yermolayeva | 4:05.55 | East Germany; Gisela Jäger; Rita Schmidt | 4:08.13 | West Germany; Astrid Hohl; Bärbel Kornhass | 4:09.55 |
| W4x+ | Romania; Doina Bardas; Elisabeta Lazăr; Mitana Botez; Ioana Tudoran; Stefania Gurau (cox) | 3:48.39 | Soviet Union; Galina Mitrokhina; Aleksandra Bocharova; Nadeschda Pronina; Tatyana Rakovshchik; Ludmila Arjakovskaia (cox) | 3:50.92 | France; Josiane Fénié; Jeanine Gonneaud; Josiane Massiasse; Jacqueline Kustner; Marie-Hélène Gin (cox) | 3:53.14 |
| W4+ | Soviet Union; Anna Kuleshova; Olga Ivanova; Tatiana Petrova; Elena Morozova; Anna Sychyova (cox) | 3:55.77 | Romania; Doina Bălașa; Mărioara Singiorzan; Elena Necula; Teodora Boicu; Rodica Iordache (cox) | 3:56.45 | East Germany; Irmhild Schulz; Angelika Noack; Ingelore Schweizer; Irina Müller; Christine Rösch (cox) | 3:59.66 |
| W8+ | Soviet Union; Larissa Sotskova; Nina Filatova; Sofia Beketova; Valentina Alekseeva; Nina Abramova; Evdokia Riabova; Valentina Rubtsova; Nina Bystrova; Nina Frolova (cox) | 3:27.78 | East Germany; Ute Marten; Renate Schlenzig; Rosel Nitsche; Christa Staack; Brigitte Ahrenholz; Susanne Spitzer; Gunhild Blanke; Renate Boesler; Gudrun Apelt (cox) | 3:35.52 | Romania; Ecaterina Trancioveanu; Elena Necula; Elena Oprea; Cristel Wiener; Florica Petcu; Elena Gawluk; Marioara Constantin; Viorica Lincaru; Stefania Gurau (cox) | 3:41.38 |

=== Men's events ===
| Event | Gold | | Silver | | Bronze | |
|---|---|---|---|---|---|---|
| Event | Country & rowers | Time | Country & rowers | Time | Country & rowers | Time |
| M1x | Argentina; Alberto Demiddi | 6:57.99 | East Germany; Götz Draeger | 7:01.41 | New Zealand; Murray Watkinson | 7:02.34 |
| M2x | East Germany; Joachim Böhmer; Uli Schmied | 6:15.27 | Norway; Frank Hansen; Svein Thøgersen | 6:15.65 | Soviet Union; Nikolai Balenkov; Gennadi Korshikov | 6:25.20 |
| M2- | East Germany; Peter Gorny; Werner Klatt | 6:43.40 | Czechoslovakia; Petr Lakomý; Lubomír Zapletal | 6:48.57 | Poland; Jerzy Broniec; Alfons Ślusarski | 6:51.46 |
| M2+ | East Germany; Wolfgang Gunkel; Jörg Lucke; Klaus-Dieter Neubert (cox) | 6:56.94 | Czechoslovakia; Pavel Svojanovský; Oldřich Svojanovský; Petr Krchov (cox) | 6:58.43 | Soviet Union; Nikolay Ivanov; Vladimir Eshinov; Aleksandr Lukyanov (cox) | 6:59.59 |
| M4- | East Germany; Frank Forberger; Frank Rühle; Dieter Grahn; Dieter Schubert | 6:00.72 | Norway; Svein Nielsen; Kjell Sverre Johansen; Tom Amundsen; Ole Nafstad | 6:03.59 | West Germany; Wolfgang Plottke; Franz Held; Peter Funnekötter; Joachim Ehrig | 6:06.02 |
| M4+ | West Germany; Alois Bierl; Gerhard Auer; Hans-Johann Färber; Peter Berger; Uwe Benter (cox) | 6:12.82 | East Germany; Harold Dimke; Manfred Schneider; Hartmut Schreiber; Manfred Schmorde; Dieter Schwarz (cox) | 6:14.95 | Soviet Union; Anushavan Gassan-Dzhalalov; Volodymyr Sterlik; Viktor Suslin; Anatoli Fedorov; Igor Rudakov (cox) | 6:14.98 |
| M8+ | New Zealand; Gary Robertson; Trevor Coker; Joe Earl; Lindsay Wilson; John Hunter; Dick Joyce; Wybo Veldman; Tony Hurt; Simon Dickie (cox) | 5:33.92 | East Germany; Dietrich Zander; Hans-Joachim Puls; Eckhard Martens; Rolf Jobst; Reinhard Gust; Klaus-Peter Foppke; Ernst Otto Borchmann; Bernd Ahrendt; Reinhard Zahn (cox) | 5:34.32 | Soviet Union; Mindaugas Vaitkus; Beniaminas Natsevicius; Apolinaras Grigas; Tiit Helmja; Pavel Solovyev; Vladimir Ilyinsky; Nikolai Sumatoshin; Aleksandr Martyshkin; Viktor Mikheyev (cox) | 5:39.74 |

The New Zealand eight would go on in unchanged composition to win the 1972 Olympic eight event.

== Medals table ==
| Rank | Nation | Gold | Silver | Bronze | Total |
|---|---|---|---|---|---|
| 1 | East Germany (GDR) | 5 | 5 | 1 | 11 |
| 2 | Soviet Union (URS) | 3 | 1 | 4 | 8 |
| 3 | Romania (ROU) | 1 | 1 | 1 | 3 |
| 4 | West Germany (FRG) | 1 | 0 | 3 | 4 |
| 5 | New Zealand (NZL) | 1 | 0 | 1 | 2 |
| 6 | Argentina (ARG) | 1 | 0 | 0 | 1 |
| 7 | Czechoslovakia (TCH) | 0 | 2 | 0 | 2 |
| 7 | Norway (NOR) | 0 | 2 | 0 | 2 |
| 9 | France (FRA) | 0 | 1 | 1 | 2 |
| 10 | Poland (POL) | 0 | 0 | 1 | 1 |
| Totals (10 entries) | | 12 | 12 | 12 | 36 |
