= Aleksandr Motin =

Soviet rower

Personal information
- Born: 16 January 1944 (age 81)
- Height: 188 cm (6 ft 2 in)
- Weight: 86 kg (190 lb)

Sport
- Sport: Rowing

Aleksandr Motin (Russian: Александр Мотин; born 16 January 1944) is a Soviet rower. He competed at the 1972 Summer Olympics in Munich with the men's coxless four where they came fourth.
