= Ross Collinge =

New Zealand rower (born 1944)

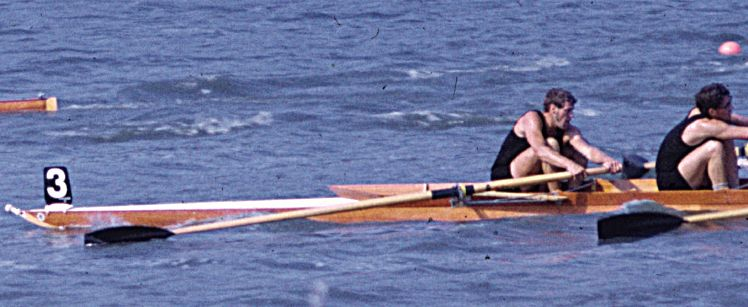
- Noel Mills (bow) and Collinge (seat 2) at the 1971 European Rowing Championships

Personal information
- Born: Ross Hounsell Collinge; 21 November 1944 (age 81) Lower Hutt, New Zealand
- Height: 187 cm (6 ft 2 in)
- Weight: 85 kg (187 lb)

Sport
- Sport: Rowing
Medal record
Men's rowing
Representing New Zealand
Olympic Games
Gold medal – first place	1968 Mexico	Coxed four
Silver medal – second place	1972 Munich	Coxless four
World Rowing Championships
Bronze medal – third place	1975 Nottingham	Eight

Ross Hounsell Collinge (born 21 November 1944) is a former New Zealand rower who won two Olympic medals.

Collinge was born in 1944 in Lower Hutt, New Zealand. He trained as a pharmacist at Petone Technical College. In rowing, he attracted attention due to his strong performance at the 1967 New Zealand championships, where he rowed for the Hutt Valley team; Dick Joyce was one of his team members. For the 1968 Summer Olympics, New Zealand qualified an eight and had a pool of four rowers and a cox as a travelling reserve; Collinge was part of this reserve. Preparations were held in Christchurch at Kerr's Reach on the Avon River. The reserve rowers were unhappy with the "spare parts" tag and felt that they were good enough to perhaps win a medal if put forward as a coxed four. The manager, Rusty Robertson, commented about them that they were "the funniest looking crew you've ever seen". There were stern discussions with the New Zealand selectors. In a training run, the coxed four was leading the eight over the whole race. In the end, the reserve rowers got their way and New Zealand entered both the coxed four and the coxed eight. Collinge won the Olympic coxed four event along with Dick Joyce, Dudley Storey, Warren Cole and Simon Dickie (cox); this was New Zealand's first gold medal in rowing. At the time, Collinge had newly qualified as a pharmacist, and recently married. The crew's winning boat was sold to a rowing club to recoup costs, and ended in splinters after a road crash. At the 1972 Summer Olympics in Munich Collinge teamed with Dick Tonks, Dudley Storey and Noel Mills to win the silver medal in the coxless four. He rowed with the coxed eight in the 1975 World Rowing Championships in Nottingham, Great Britain, and won a bronze medal.

He is married to Valerie Collinge with whom he had two children. He has one grandson currently living in Wellington, who has announced he aspires to be a rower like his grandad to "Carry on the family tradition". Since the 1980s, they have been living in a house adjacent to the house of the Indian High Commissioner in Lower Hutt.
