= Igor Kashurov =

Soviet rower

Personal information
- Born: 3 April 1951 (age 73)
- Height: 194 cm (6 ft 4 in)
- Weight: 91 kg (201 lb)

Sport
- Sport: Rowing

Igor Kashurov (Russian: Игорь Кашуров; born 3 April 1951) is a Soviet rower. He competed at the 1972 Summer Olympics in Munich with the men's coxless four where they came fourth.
