= Roger Chatelain =

French rower

Personal information
- Nationality: French
- Born: 23 April 1942 (age 82)

Sport
- Sport: Rowing

Roger Chatelain (born 23 April 1942) is a French rower. He competed at the 1964 Summer Olympics and the 1968 Summer Olympics.
