= Tomás Forray =

Argentine rower

Personal information
- Nationality: Argentine
- Born: 6 November 1950 (age 74)

Sport
- Sport: Rowing

Tomás Forray (born 6 November 1950) is an Argentine rower. He competed in the men's coxless four event at the 1972 Summer Olympics.
