= András Pályi =

Hungarian rower

Personal information
- Nationality: Hungarian
- Born: 12 December 1943 (age 81); Budapest, Hungary

Sport
- Sport: Rowing

András Pályi (born 12 December 1943) is a Hungarian rower. He competed at the 1968 Summer Olympics and the 1972 Summer Olympics.
