= Frank Forberger =

East German rower

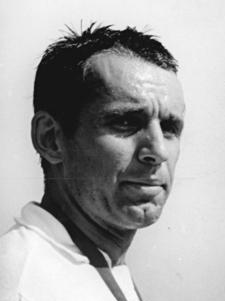
- Frank Forberger after the national championship in Brandenburg 1970

Personal information
- Born: 5 March 1943 Meißen, Germany
- Died: 30 September 1998 (aged 55) Meißen, Germany

Sport
- Sport: Rowing
Medal record
Men's rowing
Representing East Germany
Olympic Games
Gold medal – first place	1968 Mexico City	Coxless four
Gold medal – first place	1972 Munich	Coxless four
World Rowing Championships
Gold medal – first place	1966 Bled	Coxless four
Gold medal – first place	1970 St. Catharines	Coxless four
European Rowing Championships
Gold medal – first place	1967 Vichy	Coxless four
Gold medal – first place	1971 Copenhagen	Coxless four
Silver medal – second place	1969 Klagenfurt	Coxless pair

Frank Forberger (5 March 1943 – 30 September 1998) was a German rower who competed for East Germany in the 1968 Summer Olympics and in the 1972 Summer Olympics.

He was born and died in Meißen. In 1968 he was the bowman of the East German boat which won the gold medal in the coxless fours event. Four years later he won his second gold medal as bowman of the East German boat in the coxless fours event.

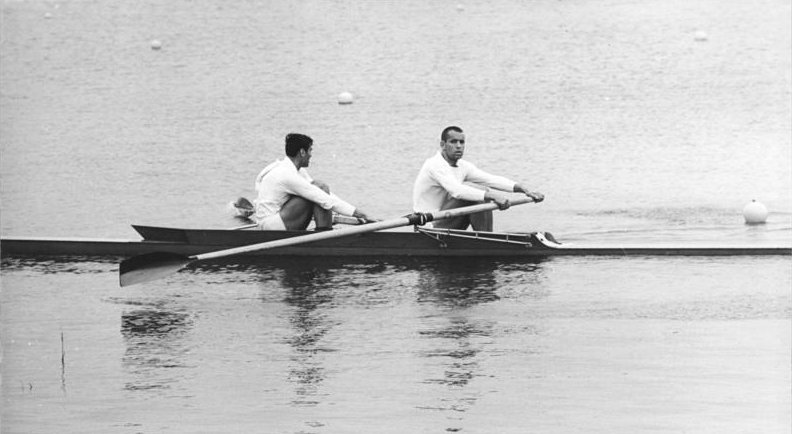
Dieter Grahn (left) and Frank Forberger
