= Csaba Czakó =

Hungarian rower (1943–2023)

Personal information
- Born: 6 April 1943 Budapest, Hungary
- Died: 25 March 2023 (aged 79)
- Height: 182 cm (6 ft 0 in)
- Weight: 75 kg (165 lb)

Sport
- Sport: Rowing
Medal record
Men's rowing
Representing Hungary
European Rowing Championships
Silver medal – second place	1967 Vichy	Coxless four

Csaba Czakó (6 April 1943 – 25 March 2023) was a Hungarian rower.

== Biography ==
Czakó was born in Budapest on 6 April 1943. At the 1967 European Rowing Championships, he competed in the coxless four and his team won silver. He competed at the 1972 Summer Olympics in Munich with the men's coxless four where they were eliminated in the heats.

Czakó died on 25 March 2023, at the age of 79.
