= Günther Karl =

German rower

Personal information
- Born: 4 January 1949 (age 77) Passau, Germany
- Height: 188 cm (6 ft 2 in)
- Weight: 87 kg (192 lb)

Sport
- Sport: Rowing
Medal record
Men's rowing
Representing West Germany
European Rowing Championships
Bronze medal – third place	1969 Klagenfurt	Eight

Günther Karl (born 4 January 1949) is a German rower who represented West Germany.

He competed at the 1968 Summer Olympics in Mexico City with the men's coxless pair where they came twelfth. At the 1969 European Rowing Championships in Klagenfurt, he won bronze with the men's eight.
