= Dudley Storey =

New Zealand rower (1939–2017)

Dudley Storey OBE
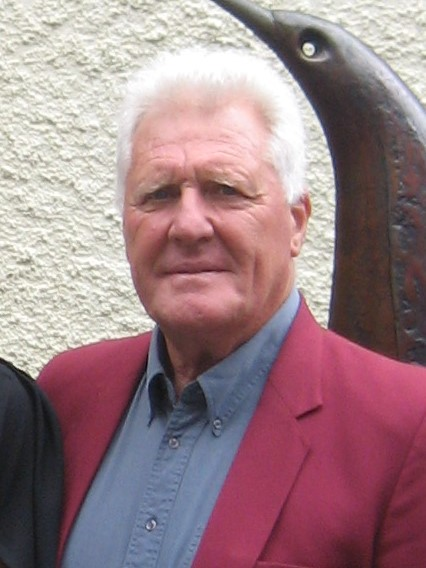
- Storey in 2008

Personal information
- Full name: Dudley Leonard Storey
- Born: 27 November 1939 Wairoa, New Zealand
- Died: 6 March 2017 (aged 77) Auckland, New Zealand

Sport
- Sport: Rowing
Medal record
Men's rowing
Representing New Zealand
Olympic Games
Gold medal – first place	1968 Mexico	Coxed four
Silver medal – second place	1972 Munich	Coxless four
World Rowing Championships
Bronze medal – third place	1970 St. Catharines	Eight

Dudley Leonard Storey OBE (27 November 1939 – 6 March 2017) was a New Zealand rower who won two Olympic medals.

== Rowing career ==
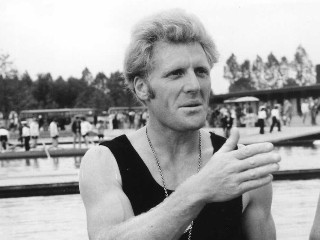
Storey at the medal ceremony of the coxless four at the 1972 Olympic Games in Munich

Storey was born in 1939 in Wairoa, New Zealand. After having received an invitation to the Henley Royal Regatta, he won the inaugural Prince Philip Challenge Cup regatta in 1963 in Henley-on-Thames. That year, the Henley regatta was regarded as the event that came closest to a world championship. Darien Boswell, Peter Masfen and Alistair Dryden made up the other rowers, and Bob Page was the cox. The same coxed four team then went to the 1964 Summer Olympics in Tokyo, where they placed a disappointing eighth.

For the 1968 Summer Olympics, New Zealand qualified an eight and had a pool of four rowers and a cox as a travelling reserve; Storey was part of this reserve. Preparations were held in Christchurch at Kerr's Reach on the Avon River. The reserve rowers were unhappy with the "spare parts" tag and felt that they were good enough to perhaps win a medal if put forward as a coxed four. The manager, Rusty Robertson, commented about them that they were "the funniest looking crew you've ever seen". There were stern discussions with the New Zealand selectors. In a training run, the coxed four was leading the eight over the whole race. In the end, the reserve rowers got their way and New Zealand entered both the coxed four and the eight. Storey won the Olympic coxed four event along with Dick Joyce, Ross Collinge, Warren Cole and Simon Dickie (cox); this was New Zealand's first gold medal in rowing. At the time, he was a 27-year-old carpet layer, whose wife was about to give birth to their first child. He was the only member of the crew to have previously rowed outside New Zealand.

Storey competed at the 1971 European Championships in Copenhagen, Denmark, and came fourth with the coxed four, alongside Noel Mills, Ross Collinge, Raymond Barry, and Peter Lindsay as cox. At the 1972 Summer Olympics in Munich he teamed with Dick Tonks, Collinge and Mills to win the Silver medal in the coxless four.

== Later career ==
Storey was manager of the successful New Zealand rowing teams from 1982 to 1986. He managed the 1982 and 1983 New Zealand eight, the country's rowing teams at the 1984 Summer Olympics in Los Angeles, and the teams at the 1986 Commonwealth Games in Edinburgh. He later coached Baradene College of the Sacred Heart's rowing squad. Also coached at Takapuna Grammar School.

In the 1983 New Year Honours, Storey was appointed an Officer of the Order of the British Empire, for services to rowing. Storey's medal-winning 1968 rowing crew was inducted into the New Zealand Sports Hall of Fame in 1990. The boat that won the 1963 Prince Philip Challenge Cup, bought in England for £300, is on display at the Auckland Rowing Club.

== Death ==
Storey died in Auckland on 6 March 2017, soon after a diagnosis of motor neurone disease.
