= Klein Lukow =

- Ortsteil of Penzlin
- Interactive map of Klein Lukow
- Location within Germany Location within Mecklenburg-Vorpommern
- Coordinates: 53°32′N 13°02′E
- Country: Germany
- State: Mecklenburg-Vorpommern
- District: Mecklenburgische Seenplatte
- Town: Penzlin

Area
  - Total: 14.13 km^{2} (5.46 sq mi)
- Elevation: 56 m (184 ft)

Population (2009-12-31)
  - Total: 247
  - Density: 17.5/km^{2} (45.3/sq mi)
- Time zone: UTC+01:00 (CET)
  - Summer (DST): UTC+02:00 (CEST)
- Postal codes: 17217
- Dialling codes: 03962
- Vehicle registration: MÜR
- Website: www.penzliner-land.de

Klein Lukow is a village and a former municipality in the Mecklenburgische Seenplatte district, in Mecklenburg-Vorpommern, in north-eastern Germany. Since 1 January 2011, it is part of the town Penzlin.

== History ==
During the final stages of World War II, on 19 February 1945, Klein Lukow was the site of a stopover during the German-organised march of some 2,700 French prisoners of war from the Oflag II-B camp headed westwards.
