= Jerzy Broniec =

Polish rower

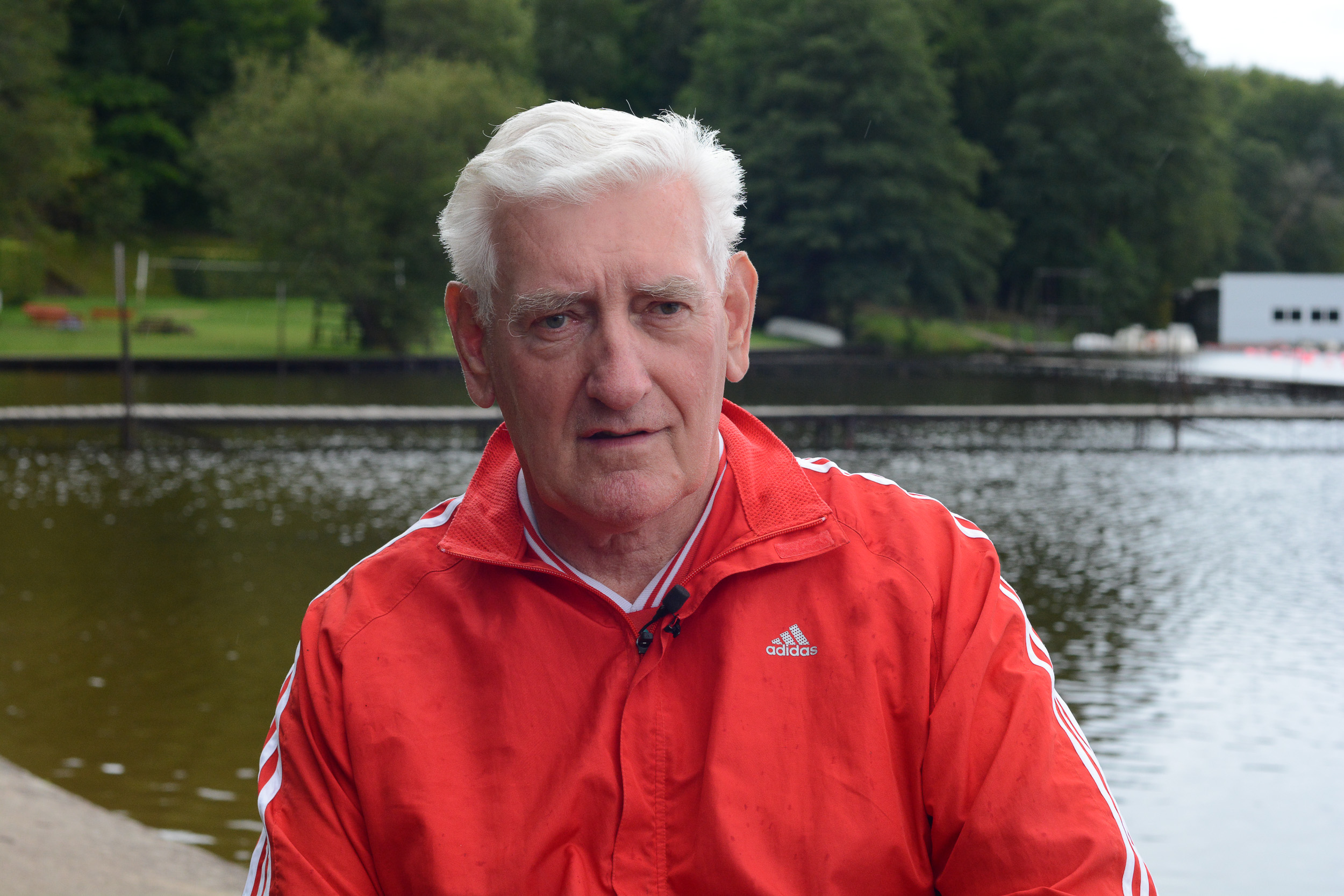

Personal information
- Nationality: Polish
- Born: 6 February 1944 (age 81); Bydgoszcz, Poland

Sport
- Sport: Rowing

Jerzy Broniec (born 6 February 1944) is a Polish former rower. He competed at the 1968 Summer Olympics, 1972 Summer Olympics and the 1976 Summer Olympics.
