= Jörg Lucke =

East German rower

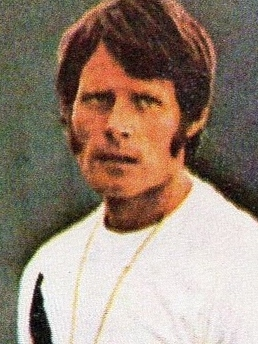
- Lucke in 1972

Personal information
- Born: 7 January 1942 (age 84) Berlin, Germany
- Height: 193 cm (6 ft 4 in)
- Weight: 91 kg (201 lb)

Sport
- Sport: Rowing
- Club: SC Berlin-Grünau
Medal record
Representing East Germany
Olympic Games
Gold medal – first place	1968 Mexico City	Coxless pair
Gold medal – first place	1972 Munich	Coxed pair
World Rowing Championships
Bronze medal – third place	1966 Bled	Eight
Silver medal – second place	1974 Lucerne	Coxed pair
Gold medal – first place	1975 Nottingham	Coxed pair
European Rowing Championships
Silver medal – second place	1969 Klagenfurt	Coxed four
Gold medal – first place	1971 Copenhagen	Coxed pair
Silver medal – second place	1973 Moscow	Coxed pair

Jörg Lucke (born 7 January 1942) is a retired East German rower. He won a bronze medal in the eights at the 1966 World Championships and an Olympic gold medal in the coxless pairs in 1968. After that he competed in the coxed pairs with Wolfgang Gunkel. Together they won the European title in 1971, the Olympics gold medal in 1972, and the world title in 1975, placing second in 1974.
