= Alberto Demiddi =

Argentine rower

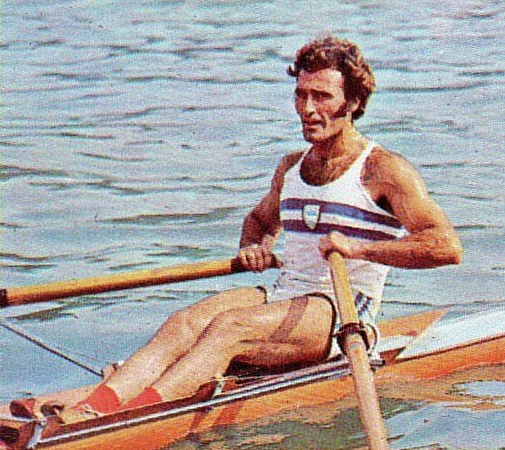
- Demiddi in 1972

Personal information
- Born: 11 April 1944 Rosario, Santa Fe, Argentina
- Died: 24 October 2000 (aged 56) San Fernando, Argentina
- Height: 184 cm (6 ft 0 in)
- Weight: 88 kg (194 lb)

Sport
- Sport: Rowing
- Club: Club Regatas Rosario
Medal record
Men's rowing
Representing Argentina
Olympic Games
| Bronze medal – third place | 1968 Mexico City | Single sculls |
| Silver medal – second place | 1972 Munich | Single sculls |
World Championships
| Gold medal – first place | 1970 St. Catharines | Single sculls |
European Championships
| Gold medal – first place | 1969 Klagenfurt | Single sculls |
| Gold medal – first place | 1971 Copenhagen | Single sculls |
Pan American Games
| Gold medal – first place | 1967 Winnipeg | Single sculls |
| Silver medal – second place | 1963 Sao Paulo | Double sculls |

Alberto Demiddi (11 April 1944 – 25 October 2000) was an Argentine rower who specialized in the single sculls event and appeared at three Olympic Games.

== Biography ==
Demiddi competed in the 1964, 1968 and 1972 Summer Olympics and placed fourth, third and second, respectively.

He held the world title in 1970 and European title in 1969 and 1971 and in 1971 won the Diamond Challenge Sculls (the premier singles sculls event) at the Henley Royal Regatta, rowing for the Club de Regatas Rosario.

In 2010, he won the Honor Konex Award from Argentina as recognition for his sport merits during his life.
