= Vitaly Sapronov =

Soviet rower

Personal information
- Born: 17 June 1945 (age 80)
- Height: 188 cm (6 ft 2 in)
- Weight: 86 kg (190 lb)

Sport
- Sport: Rowing

Vitaly Sapronov (Russian: Виталий Сапронов; born 17 June 1945) is a Soviet rower. He competed at the 1972 Summer Olympics in Munich with the men's coxless four where they came in fourth place.
