= Frank Rühle =

German rower (born 1944)

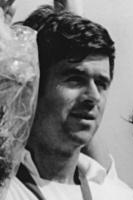
- Frank Rühle after the national championship in Brandenburg 1970

Personal information
- Born: 5 March 1944 (age 82) Dohna, Germany

Sport
- Sport: Rowing
Medal record
Men's rowing
Representing East Germany
Olympic Games
| Gold medal – first place | 1968 Mexico City | Coxless four |
| Gold medal – first place | 1972 Munich | Coxless four |
World Rowing Championships
| Gold medal – first place | 1966 Bled | Coxless four |
| Gold medal – first place | 1970 St. Catharines | Coxless four |
European Rowing Championships
| Gold medal – first place | 1967 Vichy | Coxless four |
| Gold medal – first place | 1971 Copenhagen | Coxless four |

Frank Rühle (born 5 March 1944) is a German rower who competed for East Germany in the 1968 Summer Olympics and in the 1972 Summer Olympics.

He was born in Dohna. In 1968 he was a crew member of the East German boat which won the gold medal in the coxless fours event. Four years later he won his second gold medal with the East German boat in the coxless fours event.
