= Ramón Luperón =

Cuban rower (born 1946)

Personal information
- Nationality: Cuban
- Born: 24 May 1946 (age 79)

Sport
- Sport: Rowing

Ramón Luperón (born 24 May 1946) is a Cuban rower. He competed at the 1968 Summer Olympics, 1972 Summer Olympics and the 1976 Summer Olympics.
