= Dick Tonks =

New Zealand rowing coach and former rower

Dick Tonks MNZM
Personal information
- Full name: Richard William Tonks
- Born: 21 February 1951 (age 75) Whanganui, New Zealand
Medal record
Men's rowing
Representing New Zealand
Olympic Games
| Silver medal – second place | 1972 Munich | Coxless four |

Richard William Tonks MNZM (born 21 February 1951) is a former national New Zealand rowing coach and a former rower who won a silver medal at the 1972 Summer Olympics in Munich. Through his coaching career he has coached crews to a total of 25 World Championship medals—including thirteen gold—and a total of seven Olympic medals—six of which were gold.

== Early life and rowing career ==
Dick Tonks' father, Alan Tonks, was an accomplished rower and coach, and it is presumed that his influence was a major factor in Dick's taking up rowing at Wanganui Boys' College at the age of thirteen. He first competed at the Wanganui Secondary Schools Regatta in 1965 and subsequently—coached by his father—rowed in the school's first eight for three years.

In 1970, back at the sport, he rowed for Otago in Dunedin and was able to earn a place on the national team in 1971. By 1972 he was stroking the New Zealand coxless four, alongside Ross Collinge, Dudley Storey and Noel Mills. The boat went on to win silver at the Munich Olympics, beaten by half a boat-length by the East German crew.

Curiously, Tonks never won a national title, coming second in the single scull to Murray Watkinson in 1974 and never being part of a strong enough club to win in larger boats.

== Coaching career ==
Though he coached while rowing, Tonks returned to coaching in 1989 when he was asked to coach a women's four at the Union club, in Wanganui. As well as drawing Tonks on the path to coaching success, this also led to his second marriage to Florence Matthews, a member of the four.

In 1994 world champion scullers Philippa Baker and Brenda Lawson asked Tonks to coach them in the double, leading to gold at Indianapolis, bronze at Tampere in 1995 and making the final at the Atlanta Olympics in 1996.

After this, Tonks began coaching Rob Waddell, who would go on to win gold in the single scull at Cologne in 1998 and St Catharines in 1999 before taking the gold at the 2000 Sydney Olympics. Until 2000 and his move north to Karapiro, Tonks had treated coaching as a "hobby," and was often working full-time, including work for the railways—"pushing paper, 8 to 5"—and nights spinning wool at the Cavalier Bremworth carpet factory.

Tonks has been influential in the careers of rowers such as Olympic medallists Caroline and Georgina Evers-Swindell, Mahé Drysdale, Nicky Coles, Juliette Haigh, Hamish Bond and Eric Murray. He has been the New Zealand rowing coach at the 1996 Summer Olympics in Atlanta, the 2004 Summer Olympics in Athens, the 2000 Summer Olympics in Sydney, the 2008 Summer Olympics in Beijing and the 2012 Summer Olympics in London. His contract with Rowing New Zealand was terminated in December 2015 after a public fallout over him having coached top Chinese rowers without having asked for permission from his employer. During the spat, Tonks said about Rowing New Zealand's chief executive Simon Peterson that he "couldn't run a bloody corner dairy". An arrangement was agreed on by which Tonks would continue to coach Drysdale and the women's double sculls boat (Eve MacFarlane and Zoe Stevenson) until the 2016 Summer Olympics in Rio de Janeiro in a private capacity. Drysdale won gold at the event, with was the sixth Olympic gold medal of one of Tonks' rowers.

On his coaching style, Tonks is reported to have said, "good coaching is a dictatorship and I am a dictator." He later admitted to saying this during "a very bad year." He also holds that his relationship with his athletes is a professional one, stating: "I’m their coach, not their friend." Mahé Drysdale has agreed, citing this as the reason he did not invite Tonks to his wedding to Juliette Haigh in 2013. Dick Tonks currently coaches for the Canadian national team in their preparation for the Tokyo Olympics.

== Awards ==
Dick Tonks has won the Halberg Awards' "Coach of the year" five times—in 1999, 2004, 2005, 2009 and 2012; more than any other coach in the award's 27-year history—and has been named a finalist twelve times.

He has also been awarded "World Rowing coach of the year" at the World Rowing Awards three times—2005, 2010 and 2012—since its inception in 2002. Tonks is currently the only person to have won the award more than once.

In the 2003 New Year Honours, Tonks was appointed a Member of the New Zealand Order of Merit, for services to rowing.

Awards
| Preceded by Ron Cheatley | New Zealand's Coach of the Year; 1999; 2004, 2005; 2009; 2012 | Succeeded by Don Tricker |
| Preceded by Ruth Aitken | New Zealand's Coach of the Year; 1999; 2004, 2005; 2009; 2012 | Succeeded by Graham Henry |
| Preceded by Kirsten Hellier | New Zealand's Coach of the Year; 1999; 2004, 2005; 2009; 2012 | Succeeded by Ricki Herbert |
| Preceded by Graham Henry | New Zealand's Coach of the Year; 1999; 2004, 2005; 2009; 2012 | Succeeded by Steve Hansen |
