= Dieter Schubert =

German rower (born 1943)

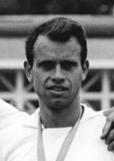
- Dieter Schubert in 1969

Personal information
- Born: 11 September 1943 (age 82) Pirna-Copitz, Germany

Sport
- Sport: Rowing
- Club: Pirnaer Ruderverein 1872
Medal record
Men's rowing
Representing East Germany
Olympic Games
Gold medal – first place	1968 Mexico City	Coxless four
Gold medal – first place	1972 Munich	Coxless four
World Rowing Championships
Gold medal – first place	1966 Bled	Coxless four
Gold medal – first place	1970 St. Catharines	Coxless four
European Rowing Championships
Gold medal – first place	1967 Vichy	Coxless four
Gold medal – first place	1969 Klagenfurt	Eight
Gold medal – first place	1971 Copenhagen	Coxless four

Dieter Schubert (born 11 September 1943) is a German rower who competed for East Germany in the 1968 Summer Olympics and in the 1972 Summer Olympics. He was born in Pirna-Copitz. In 1968 he was a crew member of the East German boat which won the gold medal in the coxless fours event. Four years later he won his second gold medal with the East German boat in the coxless fours event.
