= Ian Gordon (rower) =

Canadian rower

Personal information
- Nationality: Canadian
- Born: 14 October 1948 (age 76); Vancouver, British Columbia, Canada

Sport
- Sport: Rowing

Ian Michael Gordon (born 14 October 1948) is a Canadian rower. He competed at the 1972 Summer Olympics and the 1976 Summer Olympics.
