= Eralio Cabrera =

Cuban rower (born 1945)

Personal information
- Born: 23 August 1945 (age 79); Matanzas, Republic of Cuba

Sport
- Sport: Rowing

Eralio Cabrera (born 23 August 1945) is a Cuban rower. He competed at the 1968 Summer Olympics and the 1972 Summer Olympics.
