= Kjell Sverre Johansen =

Norwegian rower

Personal information
- Nationality: Norwegian
- Born: 20 June 1944
- Died: 7 October 1998 (aged 54)

Sport
- Sport: Rowing

Kjell Sverre Johansen (20 June 1944 – 7 October 1998) was a Norwegian rower. He competed at the 1972 Summer Olympics and the 1976 Summer Olympics.
