= Netherlands at the 1972 Summer Olympics =

- Flag of the Netherlands
- IOC code: NED (HOL used at these Games)
- NOC: Dutch Olympic Committee

in Munich
- Competitors: 119 (90 men and 29 women) in 16 sports
- Flag bearer: Nico Spits
- Medals Ranked 16th: Gold 3 Silver 1 Bronze 1 Total 5

Summer Olympics appearances (overview)
- 1900; 1904; 1908; 1912; 1920; 1924; 1928; 1932; 1936; 1948; 1952; 1956; 1960; 1964; 1968; 1972; 1976; 1980; 1984; 1988; 1992; 1996; 2000; 2004; 2008; 2012; 2016; 2020; 2024

Other related appearances
- 1906 Intercalated Games

The Netherlands competed at the 1972 Summer Olympics in Munich, West Germany. 119 competitors, 90 men and 29 women, took part in 72 events in 16 sports.

== Medalists ==
The Netherlands finished in 16th position in the final medal rankings, with three gold medals and five medals overall.

=== Gold ===
- Hennie Kuiper — Cycling Road, Men's Individual Road Race
- Wim Ruska — Judo, Men's Heavyweight
- Wim Ruska — Judo, Men's Open Category

=== Silver ===
- Mieke Jaapies — Canoe, Women's Flatwater K-1 500m

=== Bronze ===
- Roel Luynenburg and Ruud Stokvis — Rowing, Men's Coxless Pairs

== Athletics ==
Men's 800 metres

- Sjef Hensgens

- Heat — 1:51.2 (→ did not advance)

Men's 1500 metres

- Haico Scharn

- Heat — 3:41.4
- Semifinals — 3:44.4 (→ did not advance)

Men's 5000 metres

- Jos Hermens

- Heat — DNS (→ did not advance) (left Munich after the murder of the Israeli athletes)

== Boxing ==
Men's Welterweight (– 67 kg)

- James Vrij

- First Round — Bye
- Second Round — Lost to János Kajdi (HUN), 1:4

Men's Light Middleweight (– 71 kg)

- Anthony Richardson

- First Round — Bye
- Second Round — Defeated Svetomir Belić (YUG), 3:2
- Third Round — Lost to Loucif Hamani (ALG), TKO-2

== Cycling ==
Eleven cyclists represented the Netherlands in 1972.

Individual road race

- Hennie Kuiper — 04:14:37 (→ Gold Medal)
- Piet van Katwijk — 04:15:13 (→ 11th place)
- Cees Priem — 04:15:13 (→ 12th place)
- Fedor den Hertog — 04:15:13 (→ 25th place)

Team time trial

- Fedor den Hertog
- Hennie Kuiper
- Cees Priem
- Aad van den Hoek

Sprint

- Klaas Balk
- Peter van Doorn

1000m time trial

- Peter van Doorn

- Final — 1:08.09 (→ 11th place)

Tandem

- Klaas Balk and Peter van Doorn → 7th place

Individual pursuit

- Roy Schuiten

Team pursuit

- Ad Dekkers
- Gerard Kamper
- Herman Ponsteen
- Roy Schuiten

== Diving ==
Women's 3m Springboard

- Mariette Dommers — 239.40 points (→ 23rd place)

Women's 10m Platform

- Annita Smith — 156.99 points (→ 27th place)

== Fencing ==
One fencer represented the Netherlands in 1972.

Men's sabre

- Eduard Ham

== Hockey ==
Men's Team Competition

- Preliminary Round (Group B)

- Drew with India (1-1)
- Defeated Poland (4-2)
- Defeated Kenya (5-1)
- Defeated New Zealand (2-0)
- Defeated Mexico (4-0)
- Lost to Great Britain (1-3)
- Defeated Australia (3-2)

- Semi Final Round

- Lost to West Germany (0-3)

- Bronze Medal Match

- Lost to India (1-2) → 4th place

- Team Roster

- André Bolhuis
- Marinus Dijkerman
- Thijs Kaanders
- Coen Kranenberg
- Ties Kruize
- Wouter Leefers
- Flip Lidth de Jeude
- Paul Litjens
- Irving van Nes
- Maarten Sikking (gk)
- Frans Spits
- Nico Spits
- Bert Taminiau
- Kick Thole
- Pieter Weemers
- Jeroen Zweerts

== Modern pentathlon ==
Three male pentathletes represented the Netherlands in 1972.

Men's Individual Competition:

- Jan Bekkenk — 4391 points (→ 46th place)
- Rob Vonk — 4153 points (→ 53rd place)
- Henk Krediet — 3786 points (→ 58th place)

Men's Team Competition:

- Bekkenk, Vonk, and Krediet — 12340 points (→ 18th place)

== Rowing ==
Men's Coxless Pairs

- Roel Luynenburg and Ruud Stokvis

- Heat — 7:26.80
- Repechage — 7:38.51
- Semi Finals — 7:41.86
- Final — 6:58.70 (→ Bronze Medal)

Men's Coxed Pairs

- Bernard Luttikhuizen, René Kieft and Herman Zaanen

- Heat — 8:00.15
- Repechage — 8:17.37 (→ did not advance)

Men's Coxed Fours

- Wim Grothuis, Evert Kroes, Jan Willem van Woudenberg, Johan ter Haar, and Kees de Korver

- Heat — 6:53.30
- Semi Finals — 7:23.66
- B-Final — 7:05.83 (→ 7th place)

Men's Eights

- Henk Rouwé, Jannes Munneke, Frank Mulder, Hans Huisinga, Jan van der Vliet, Herman Eggink, Bram Tuinzing, Pieter Offens, and Rutger Stuffken

- Heat — 6:13.03
- Semi Finals — 6:31.70
- B-Final — 6:23.55 (→ 9th place)

== Shooting ==
Three male shooters represented Netherlands in 1972.

50 m rifle, prone

- Willy Hillen

Skeet

- Ben Pon
- Eric Swinkels

== Swimming ==
Men's 200m Freestyle

- Peter Prijdekker

1. Heat – 1:58.78 (→ did not advance, 18th place)

Men's 400m Freestyle

- Ton van Klooster

1. Heat – 4:11.72 (→ did not advance, 17th place)

Men's 1500m Freestyle

- Ton van Klooster

1. Heat – 16:34.77 (→ did not advance, 12th place)

Men's 100m Backstroke

- Bob Schoutsen

1. Heat – 1:00.76
2. Semi Final – 1:00.48 (→ did not advance, 9th place)

Men's 200m Backstroke

- Bob Schoutsen

1. Heat – 2:10.56 (→ did not advance, 9th place)

Men's 200m Individual Medley

- François van Kruijsdijk

1. Heat – 2:17.14 (→ did not advance, 24th place)

Men's 400m Individual Medley

- Roger van Hamburg

1. Heat – 4:50.70 (→ did not advance, 19th place)

Men's 4 × 100 m Freestyle Relay

- Peter Prijdekker, Bert Bergsma, Roger van Hamburg, and Hans Elzerman

1. Heat – 3:41.36 (→ did not advance, 11th place)

Men's 4 × 200 m Freestyle Relay

- Peter Prijdekker, Bert Bergsma, Roger van Hamburg, and Hans Elzerman

1. Heat – 8:00.87 (→ did not advance, 10th place)

Women's 100m Freestyle

- Enith Brigitha

1. Heat – 1:00.02
2. Semi Final – 59.75
3. Final – 1:00.09 (→ 8th place)

- Hansje Bunschoten

1. Heat – 1:00.82
2. Semi Final – 1:00.79 (→ did not advance, 12th place)

- Anke Rijnders

1. Heat – 1:00.76
2. Semi Final – 1:00.84 (→ did not advance, 13th place)

Women's 200m Freestyle

- Hansje Bunschoten

1. Heat – 2:08.58
2. Final – 2:08.40 (→ 6th place)

- Anke Rijnders

1. Heat – 2:09.09
2. Final – 2:09.41 (→ 7th place)

Women's 400m Freestyle

- Hansje Bunschoten

1. Heat – 4:31.76
2. Final – 4:29.70 (→ 7th place)

- Anke Rijnders

1. Heat – 4:29.94
2. Final – 4:31.51 (→ 8th place)

Women's 800m Freestyle

- Hansje Bunschoten

1. Heat – 9:21.13
2. Final – 9:16.69 (→ 7th place)

Women's 100m Backstroke

- Enith Brigitha

1. Heat – 1:06.71
2. Semi Final – 1:06.49
3. Final – 1:06.82 (→ 6th place)

- Annemarie Groen

1. Heat – 1:09.55 (→ did not advance, 21st place)

- Marianne Vermaat

1. Heat – 1:09.14
2. Semi Final – 1:09.11 (→ did not advance, 16th place)

Women's 200m Backstroke

- Enith Brigitha

1. Heat – 2:23.70
2. Final – 2:23.70 (→ 6th place)

- Annemarie Groen

1. Heat – 2:29.17 (→ did not advance, 23rd place)

Women's 100m Breaststroke

- Alie te Riet

1. Heat – 1:18.79 (→ did not advance, 20th place)

- Tineke Hofland

1. Heat – 1:19.38 (→ did not advance, 28th place)

Women's 200m Breaststroke

- Alie te Riet

1. Heat – 2:28.49 (→ did not advance, 17th place)

- Josien Elzerman

1. Heat – 2:28.18 (→ did not advance, 19th place)

Women's 100m Butterfly

- Frieke Buys

1. Heat – 1:06.89
2. Semi Final – 1:06.78 (→ did not advance, 12th place)

Women's 200m Butterfly

- Frieke Buys

1. Heat – 2:24.20 (→ did not advance, 9th place)

Women's 200m Individual Medley

- Hennie Penterman

1. Heat – 2:28.99 (→ did not advance, 12th place)

- Wijda Mazereeuw

1. Heat – 2:32.59 (→ did not advance, 26th place)

- Gerda Lassooy

1. Heat – 2:32.92 (→ did not advance, 30th place)

Women's 400m Individual Medley

- Hennie Penterman

1. Heat – 5:41.99 (→ did not advance, 11th place)

- Gerda Lassooy

1. Heat – 5:22.09 (→ did not advance, 21st place)

- Wijda Mazereeuw

1. Heat – 5:24.00 (→ did not advance, 23rd place)

Women's 4 × 100 m Freestyle Relay

- Enith Brigitha, Anke Rijnders, Hansje Bunschoten, and Josien Elzerman

1. Heat – 4:02.70
2. Final – 4:01.49 (→ 5th place)

Women's 4 × 100 m Medley Relay

- Enith Brigitha, Alie te Riet, Frieke Buys, and Anke Rijnders

1. Heat – 4:32.20

- Enith Brigitha, Alie te Riet, Anke Rijnders, and Hansje Bunschoten

1. Final – 4:29.99 (→ 5th place)

== Water polo ==
Men's Team Competition

- Preliminary Round (Group B)

- Lost to Hungary (0-3)
- Defeated Australia (4-2)
- Drew with West Germany (4-4)
- Defeated Greece (6-2)

- Final Round (Group II)

- Defeated Bulgaria (5-2)
- Defeated Cuba (8-6)
- Drew with Romania (5-5)
- Defeated Spain (7-5) → 7th place

- Team Roster

- Mart Bras
- Ton Buunk
- Wim Hermsen
- Hans Hoogveld
- Evert Kroon
- Hans Parrel
- Ton Schmidt
- Wim van de Schilde
- Gijze Stroboer
- Jan Evert Veer
- Hans Wouda
