= Rowing at the 1972 Summer Olympics – Men's coxed four =

Men's coxed four at the Games of the XX Olympiad
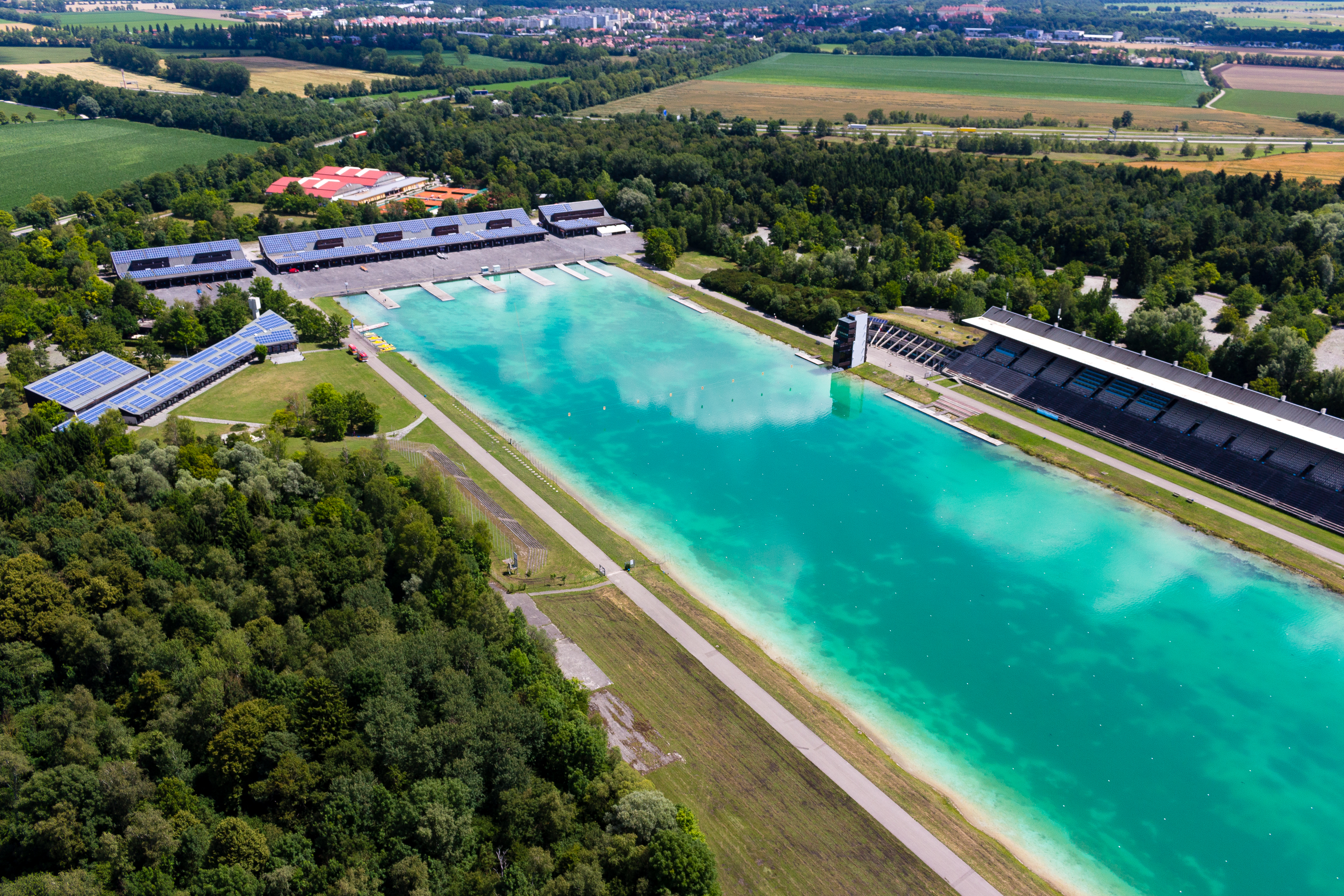
- Aerial view of the venue in Oberschleißheim
- Venue: Oberschleißheim Regatta Course
- Dates: 27 August – 2 September 1972
- Competitors: 70 from 14 nations
- Winning time: 6:31.85

Medalists
1st place, gold medalist(s)		West Germany: Peter Berger; Hans-Johann Färber; Gerhard Auer; Alois Bierl; Uwe Benter
2nd place, silver medalist(s)		East Germany: Dietrich Zander; Reinhard Gust; Eckhard Martens; Rolf Jobst; Klaus-Dieter Ludwig
3rd place, bronze medalist(s)		Czechoslovakia: Otakar Mareček; Karel Neffe; Vladimír Jánoš; František Provazník; Vladimír Petříček

The men's coxed four competition at the 1972 Summer Olympics in Munich took place from 27 August to 2 September at the Olympic Reggatta Course in Oberschleißheim. There were 14 boats (70 competitors) from 14 nations, with each nation limited to a single boat in the event. The event was won by West Germany; it was the nation's first medal as a separate team, but the third time in four Games that a West German crew had won gold (with crews from West Germany winning in 1960 and 1964 under the flag of the United Team of Germany). East Germany repeated as silver medallists, though with a new crew. Bronze went to Czechoslovakia, the nation's first medal in the men's coxed four since 1952.

== Background ==
This was the 14th appearance of the event. Rowing had been on the programme in 1896 but was cancelled due to bad weather. The coxed four was one of the four initial events introduced in 1900. It was not held in 1904 or 1908, but was held at every Games from 1912 to 1992 when it (along with the men's coxed pair) was replaced with the men's lightweight double sculls and men's lightweight coxless four.

New Zealand's victory at the 1968 Olympics had been a surprise; teams from both East and West Germany had been dominant before then (winning the 1960 and 1964 Olympics, 1962 and 1966 World Championships, and most of the European championships). The Germans continued their form between Mexico City and Munich, with West Germany winning and East Germany the runner-up at the 1970 World Championship, along with both the 1969 and 1971 European championships. The two German crews were heavily favoured again at the 1972 Games.

For the third time in five Games, no nations made their debut in the event. The United States made its 12th appearance, most among nations to that point.

== Competition format ==
The coxed four event featured five-person boats, with four rowers and a coxswain. It was a sweep rowing event, with the rowers each having one oar (and thus each rowing on one side). The competition used the 2000 metres distance that became standard at the 1912 Olympics and which has been used ever since except at the 1948 Games.

The tournament used the four-round format (three main rounds and a repechage) that had been used in 1968. The competition continued to use the six-boat heat standardised in 1960 as well as the "B" final for ranking 7th through 12th place introduced in 1964.

- Quarterfinals: Three heats of 4 or 5 boats each. The top three boats in each heat (9 total) advanced directly to the semifinals. The remaining boats (5 total) went to the repechage.
- Repechage: One heat of 5 boats each. The top three boats rejoined the quarterfinal winners in the semifinals. The other boats (2 total) were eliminated.
- Semifinals: Two heats of 6 boats each. The top three boats in each heat (6 total) advanced to Final A, the remaining boats (6 total) went to Final B.
- Final: Two finals. Final A consisted of the top 6 boats. Final B placed boats 7 through 12.

== Schedule ==
All times are Central European Time (UTC+1)

Date	Time	Round
Sunday, 27 August 1972	14:00	Quarterfinals
Tuesday, 29 August 1972	9:00	Repechage
Thursday, 31 August 1972	11:30	Semifinals
Friday, 1 September 1972	10:00	Final B
Saturday, 2 September 1972	10:00	Final A

== Results ==
=== Quarterfinals ===
The top three of each heat advanced to the semifinal round; the remainder went to the repechage.

==== Quarterfinal 1 ====
Rank	Rowers	Coxswain	Nation	Time	Notes
1	Peter Berger; Hans-Johann Färber; Gerhard Auer; Alois Bierl	Uwe Benter	West Germany	6:46.66	Q
2	Volodymyr Sterlik; Vladimir Solovyov; Aleksandr Lyubaturov; Yury Shamayev	Igor Rudakov	Soviet Union	6:50.21	Q
3	Warren Cole; Chris Nilsson; John Clark; David Lindstrom	Peter Lindsay	New Zealand	6:51.76	Q
4	David Sawyier; Charles Ruthford; Chad Rudolph; Mike Vespoli	Stewart MacDonald	United States	6:56.01	R
5	Alf Hansen; Finn Tveter; Tom Welo; Petter Wærness	Jørgen Cappelen	Norway	7:05.75	R

==== Quarterfinal 2 ====
Rank	Rowers	Coxswain	Nation	Time	Notes
1	Hanspeter Lüthi; Urs Fankhauser; Franz Rentsch; Denis Oswald	Rolf Stadelmann	Switzerland	6:53.30	Q
2	Antonio Baldacci; Renzo Sambo; Pasquale Chiabai; Claudio Padoan	Alberto Cecchi	Italy	6:53.59	Q
3	Christopher Pierce; Alan Almand; Hugh Matheson; Rooney Massara	Patrick Sweeney	Great Britain	6:57.33	Q
4	John Lee; Peter Shakespear; Will Baillieu; Philip Wilkinson	Vern Bowrey	Australia	7:07.00	R
5	Mogens Holm; Bjarne Pedersen; Per Wind; Jens Lindhardt	Kim Wind	Denmark	7:08.22	R

==== Quarterfinal 3 ====
Rank	Rowers	Coxswain	Nation	Time	Notes
1	Dietrich Zander; Reinhard Gust; Eckhard Martens; Rolf Jobst	Klaus-Dieter Ludwig	East Germany	6:44.57	Q
2	Otakar Mareček; Karel Neffe; Vladimír Jánoš; František Provazník	Vladimír Petříček	Czechoslovakia	6:49.41	Q
3	Wim Grothuis; Evert Kroes; Jan-Willem van Woudenberg; Johan ter Haar	Kees de Korver	Netherlands	6:53.30	Q
4	Edgar Smith; James Walker; Roger Jackson; Robert Cunliffe	Michael Conway	Canada	7:01.52	R

=== Repechage ===
The top three finishers advanced to the semifinal round.

Rank	Rowers	Coxswain	Nation	Time	Notes
1	David Sawyier; Charles Ruthford; Chad Rudolph; Mike Vespoli	Stewart MacDonald	United States	7:02.68	Q
2	Edgar Smith; James Walker; Roger Jackson; Robert Cunliffe	Michael Conway	Canada	7:04.35	Q
3	Alf Hansen; Finn Tveter; Tom Welo; Petter Wærness	Jørgen Cappelen	Norway	7:05.09	Q
4	John Lee; Peter Shakespear; Will Baillieu; Philip Wilkinson	Vern Bowrey	Australia	7:07.08	
5	Mogens Holm; Bjarne Pedersen; Per Wind; Jens Lindhardt	Kim Wind	Denmark	7:19.67	

=== Semifinals ===
First three qualify to the Final A, remainder to Final B.

==== Semifinal 1 ====
Rank	Rowers	Coxswain	Nation	Time	Notes
1	Peter Berger; Hans-Johann Färber; Gerhard Auer; Alois Bierl	Uwe Benter	West Germany	7:19.43	QA
2	Otakar Mareček; Karel Neffe; Vladimír Jánoš; František Provazník	Vladimír Petříček	Czechoslovakia	7:20.95	QA
3	Warren Cole; Chris Nilsson; John Clark; David Lindstrom	Peter Lindsay	New Zealand	7:21.94	QA
4	Hanspeter Lüthi; Urs Fankhauser; Franz Rentsch; Denis Oswald	Rolf Stadelmann	Switzerland	7:28.25	QB
5	Alf Hansen; Finn Tveter; Tom Welo; Petter Wærness	Jørgen Cappelen	Norway	7:32.51	QB
6	Christopher Pierce; Alan Almand; Hugh Matheson; Rooney Massara	Patrick Sweeney	Great Britain	7:35.11	QB

==== Semifinal 2 ====
Rank	Rowers	Coxswain	Nation	Time	Notes
1	Volodymyr Sterlik; Vladimir Solovyov; Aleksandr Lyubaturov; Yury Shamayev	Igor Rudakov	Soviet Union	7:09.08	QA
2	Dietrich Zander; Reinhard Gust; Eckhard Martens; Rolf Jobst	Klaus-Dieter Ludwig	East Germany	7:11.12	QA
3	David Sawyier; Charles Ruthford; Chad Rudolph; Mike Vespoli	Stewart MacDonald	United States	7:18.59	QA
4	Wim Grothuis; Evert Kroes; Jan-Willem van Woudenberg; Johan ter Haar	Kees de Korver	Netherlands	7:23.66	QB
5	Edgar Smith; James Walker; Roger Jackson; Robert Cunliffe	Michael Conway	Canada	7:31.90	QB
6	Antonio Baldacci; Renzo Sambo; Pasquale Chiabai; Claudio Padoan	Alberto Cecchi	Italy	7:34.67	QB

=== Finals ===
==== Final B ====
Rank	Rowers	Coxswain	Nation	Time
7	Wim Grothuis; Evert Kroes; Jan-Willem van Woudenberg; Johan ter Haar	Kees de Korver	Netherlands	7:05.83
8	Hanspeter Lüthi; Urs Fankhauser; Franz Rentsch; Denis Oswald	Rolf Stadelmann	Switzerland	7:07.80
9	Alf Hansen; Finn Tveter; Tom Welo; Petter Wærness	Jørgen Cappelen	Norway	7:07.85
10	Christopher Pierce; Alan Almand; Hugh Matheson; Rooney Massara	Patrick Sweeney	Great Britain	7:12.14
11	Antonio Baldacci; Renzo Sambo; Pasquale Chiabai; Claudio Padoan	Alberto Cecchi	Italy	7:13.03
12	Edgar Smith; James Walker; Roger Jackson; Robert Cunliffe	Michael Conway	Canada	7:16.13

==== Final A ====
Rank	Rowers	Coxswain	Nation	Time
1st place, gold medalist(s)	Peter Berger; Hans-Johann Färber; Gerhard Auer; Alois Bierl	Uwe Benter	West Germany	6:31.85
2nd place, silver medalist(s)	Dietrich Zander; Reinhard Gust; Eckhard Martens; Rolf Jobst	Klaus-Dieter Ludwig	East Germany	6:33.30
3rd place, bronze medalist(s)	Otakar Mareček; Karel Neffe; Vladimír Jánoš; František Provazník	Vladimír Petříček	Czechoslovakia	6:35.64
4	Volodymyr Sterlik; Vladimir Solovyov; Aleksandr Lyubaturov; Yury Shamayev	Igor Rudakov	Soviet Union	6:37.71
5	David Sawyier; Charles Ruthford; Chad Rudolph; Mike Vespoli	Stewart MacDonald	United States	6:41.86
6	Warren Cole; Chris Nilsson; John Clark; David Lindstrom	Peter Lindsay	New Zealand	6:42.55
