= Wind (surname) =

- Pronunciation: /ˈwɪnd/
- Language: Old English

Origin
- Meaning: "speedy as wind"
- Region of origin: England

Other names
- Variant form: Wynde

Wind is a topographical surname, of English origin, for someone who lived near a pathway, alleyway, or road. It is most popular in North East England, especially in Newcastle upon Tyne and Sunderland. The surname is also popular in the Netherlands and Denmark. The surname has several spellings including Waind, Wind, Wynd, Wain and Wean.

== Origins ==
Wind originates from the pre-7th century Old English gewind. It describes either a person who lived in a particularly windy area such as North East England or a "winding" road. In medieval times Wind was possibly given to a speedy runner or messenger.

The surname Wind was first found in Lancashire, a ceremonial county in North West England, at Windle with Hardshaw, a township, in the parish and union of Prescot, hundred of West Derby. "Before the reign of John, Windhull gave name to a family, of whom was Edusa, widow of Alan de Windhull, who obtained from that king a summons for her dower against Alan de Windhull, son of the former."

== Incidence, frequency and rank in area ==
According to Forebears.io, the highest incidence of the Wind surname can be found in the United States, followed by Germany, the Netherlands, and Denmark.

Incidence, frequency and rank in area
| Country | Incidence | Frequency | Rank in area |
|---|---|---|---|
| United States | 3,778 | 1:95,939 | 10,736 |
| Germany | 3,135 | 1:25,680 | 3,398 |
| The Netherlands | 2,868 | 1:3,336 | 636 |
| Denmark | 1,692 | 1:3,336 | 281 |

== Notable people with the surname ==
- Alex Wind (born 2001), American student activist
- Cornelis Wind (1867–1911), Dutch physicist
- Diana Wind (born 1957), Dutch art historian
- Dorothy Wind, American baseball player
- Edgar Wind (1900–1971), British historian
- Edmund De Wind (1883–1918), Canadian/Irish war hero
- Franz Ludwig Wind (1719–1989), Swiss sculptor
- Hans Wind (1919–1995), Finnish World War II flying ace
- Harmen Wind (1945–2010), Dutch poet
- Henning Wind (1937–2025), Danish competitive sailor
- Herbert Warren Wind (1916–2005), American writer
- John Wind (1819–1863), English architect
- Jonas Wind (born 1999), Danish footballer
- Kim Wind (born 1957), Danish rower
- Marlene Wind (born 1963), Danish political scientist
- Nymphia Wind (born 1995), Taiwanese and American drag performer
- Per Wind (born 1955), Danish footballer
- Per Wind (born 1947), Danish rower
- Pierre Wind (born 1965), Dutch chef
- Susie Wind (born 1968), American visual artist
- Tommy Wind, American illusionist
- Willie Wind (1913–1995), American artist
