= Philip Wilkinson (rower) =

Australian rower

Personal information
- Nationality: Australian
- Born: 10 August 1947 (age 78)
- Education: Cranbrook School, Sydney

Sport
- Sport: Rowing
- Club: UTS Haberfield Rowing Club

Achievements and titles
- National finals: King's Cup 1970–71

Philip Wilkinson (born 10 August 1947) is an Australian former representative rower. He competed in the men's coxed four event at the 1972 Summer Olympics.

== Club, state and Olympic rowing ==
Wilkinson was educated at Cranbrook School, Sydney where he took up rowing. At the second ever Australian Rowing Championships in Canberra in 1964 he rowed in a Cranbrook schoolboy eight His senior rowing was from the Haberfield Rowing Club.

Wilkinson was selected in New South Wales state representative men's senior eights contesting the King's Cup at the Interstate Regatta within the Australian Rowing Championships in 1970 and 1971. At the 1972 Australian Rowing Championships Wilkinson was in the two seat of a composite Drummoyne/Sydney/Haberfield four which took the men's coxed four national title, qualifying all crew members for the Australian Olympic squad.

Wilkinson, his Haberfield bow teammate John Lee and coxswain Vern Bowrey from the national champion coxed four of 1972 were selected as the Australian 4+ for Munich 1972. Drummoyne's Brian Denny was also selected at stroke but was electrocuted in a work accident in the Olympic lead-up. Monash University's Will Baillieu and West Australian Peter Shakespear came into the Olympic four. In Munich they finished in overall thirteenth place.
