= Vern Bowrey =

Australian rowing cox

Personal information
- Full name: Vernon Arthur Bowrey
- Nationality: Australian
- Born: 20 August 1948 (age 77)
- Education: Newington College

Sport
- Country: Australia
- Sport: Rowing

Vernon Arthur Bowrey (born 20 August 1948) is an Australian former representative rowing coxswain. He was a national champion and an Olympian, competing in the men's coxed four event at the 1972 Munich Olympics.

== Club and state rowing ==
Bowrey was introduced to rowing at Newington College which he attended from 1960 until 1965. His senior club rowing was from the Haberfield Rowing Club.

He first made state selection for New South Wales in the 1968 women's lightweight four which raced for the Victoria Cup at the Interstate Regatta within the Australian Rowing Championships. In 1973 he again coxed the NSW women's lightweight four, this time to a title win in the Victoria Cup. In 1974 he steered a NSW men's lightweight four contesting the Penrith Cup at the Interstate Regatta.

At the 1972 Australian Rowing Championships Bowery was in the stern of a composite Haberfield four which took the men's coxed four national title, qualifying all crew members for the Australian Olympic squad.

== International representative rowing ==
Bowery and his Haberfield bow pair teammates John Lee and Philip Wilkinson from the national champion coxed four of 1972 were selected as the Australian 4+ for Munich 1972. Drummoyne's Brian Denny was also selected at stroke but was electrocuted in a work accident in the Olympic lead-up. Monash University's Will Baillieu and West Australian Peter Shakespear came into the Olympic four. The finished in overall thirteenth place.

== Business career ==
Bowery worked in magazine publishing and was publisher at Time Magazine Australia from 1990 to 2003.
