= Christopher Pierce (rower) =

British rower

Personal information
- Full name: Christopher Thomas Pierce
- Nationality: British
- Born: 21 December 1942 (age 83) Battle, Sussex, England

Sport
- Sport: Rowing

Christopher Thomas Pierce (born 21 December 1942) is a British retired rower who competed in the 1972 Summer Olympics.

== Rowing career ==
Pierce won the coxed fours with Alan Almand, Hugh Matheson, Dick Findlay and Patrick Sweeney, rowing for a Tideway Scullers and Leander composite, at the inaugural 1972 National Rowing Championships. The winning crew were then selected to represent Great Britain at the 1972 Olympics. Rooney Massara replaced Findlay in the men's coxed four event, where the crew finished in tenth place after being knocked out in the semi-finals.
