= Wærness =

Wærness is a Norwegian surname. Notable people with the surname include:

- Anne Lise Wærness (born 1951), Norwegian high jumper
- Gunnar Wærness (born 1971), Norwegian poet
- Kari Wærness
- Petter Wærness (born 1947), Norwegian rower
