= Padoan =

Padoan is a surname. Notable people with the surname include:

- Claudio Padoan (born 1948), Italian rower
- Loredana Padoan (1924–2016), Italian actress
- Pier Carlo Padoan (born 1950), Italian economist
- Eva Padoan (born 1987), Italian voice actress
