= Alie te Riet =

Dutch swimmer (born 1953)

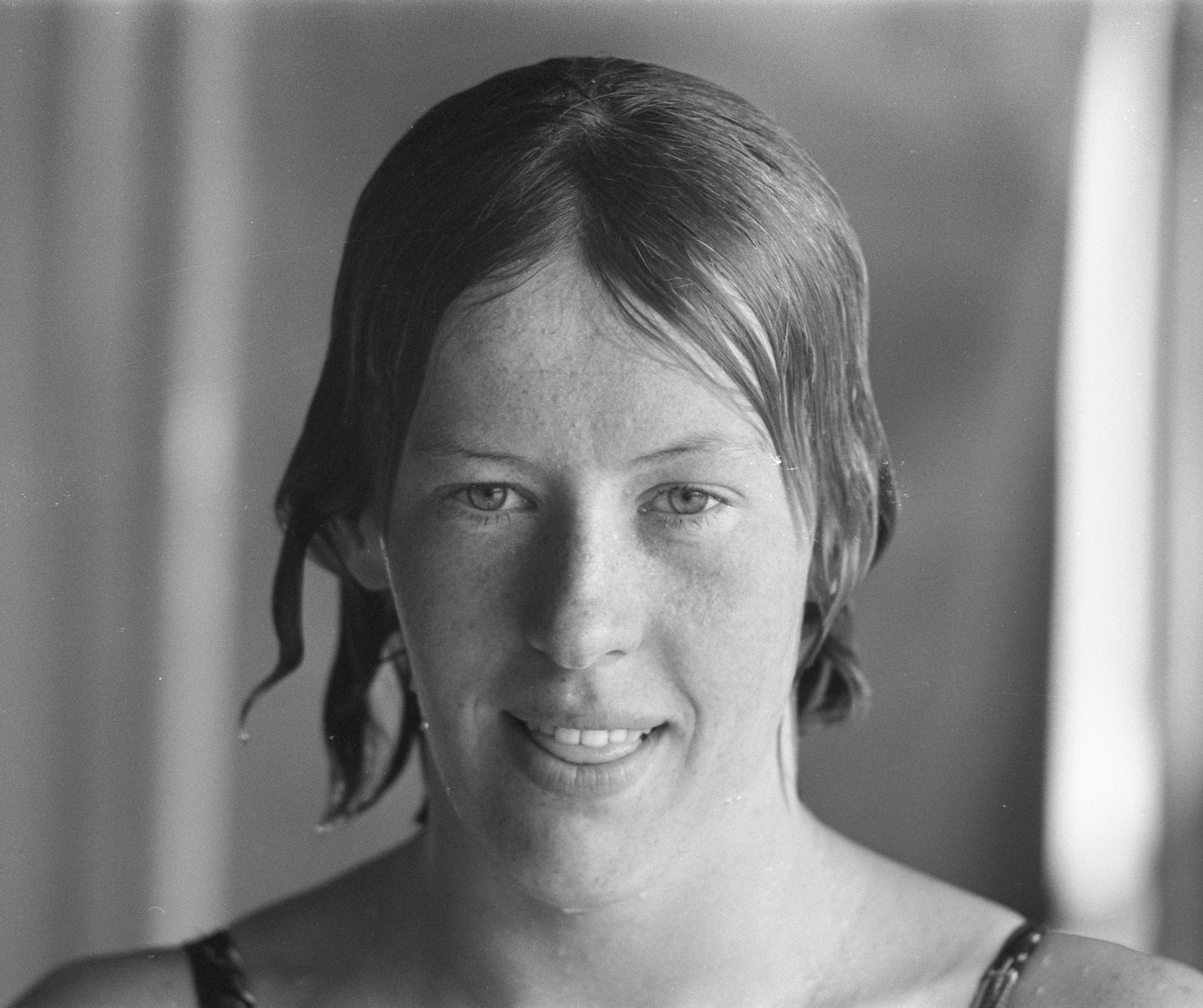
- Alie te Riet in 1972

Personal information
- Born: August 4, 1953 (age 72) Groningen, Netherlands

Sport
- Sport: Swimming
- Strokes: Breaststroke

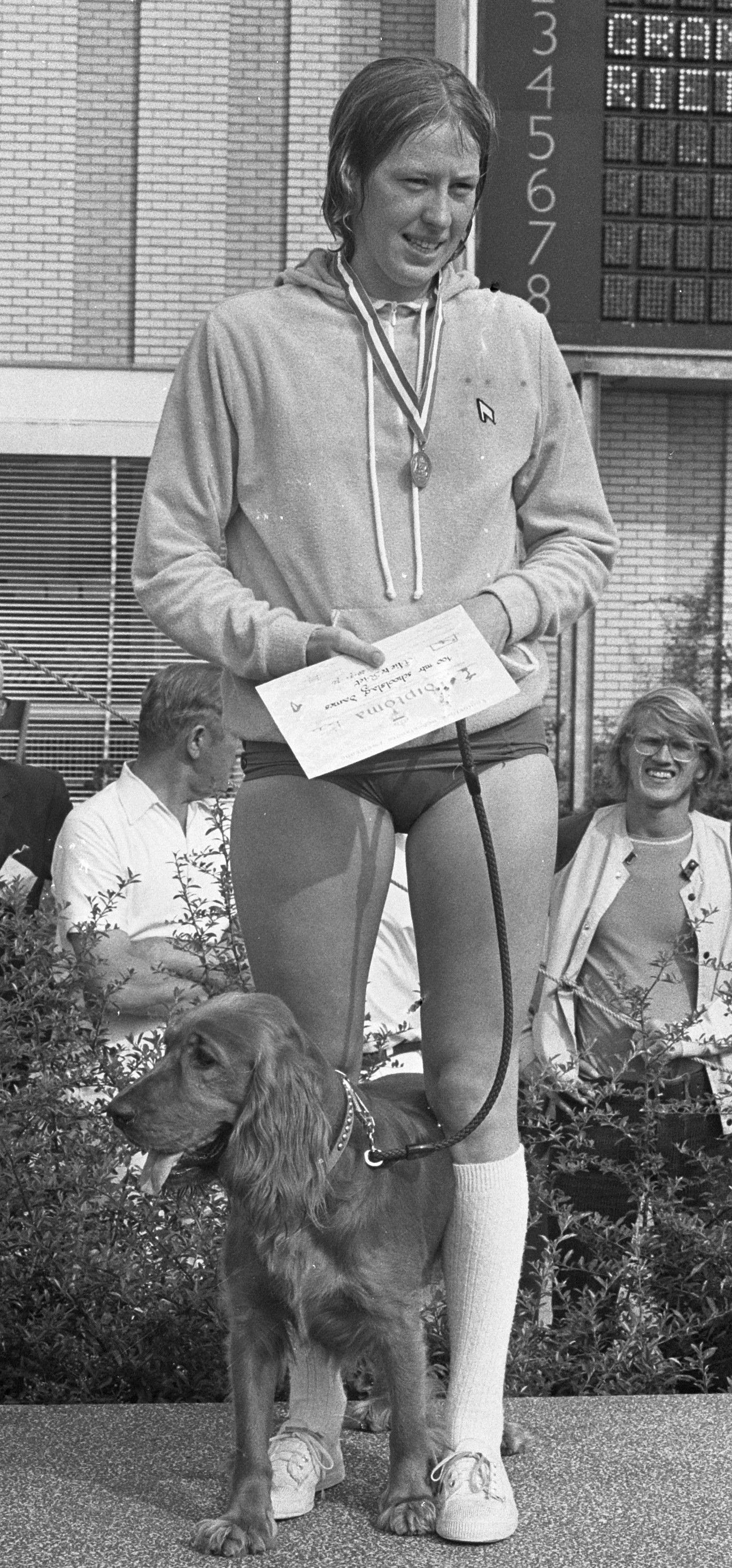
Alie te Riet in 1972

Alice ("Alie") te Riet (born August 4, 1953) is a former breaststroke swimmer from the Netherlands, who competed for her native country at the 1972 Summer Olympics in Munich, West Germany. There she was eliminated in the qualifying heats of the 100 m breaststroke, clocking 1:18.79 (20th place), and the same in the 200 m breaststroke: 2:48.49 (17th place). As a member of the Dutch relay team, Te Riet finished in fifth place in the 4x100 m medley relay (4:29.99), alongside Enith Brigitha (backstroke), Anke Rijnders (butterfly) and Hansje Bunschoten (freestyle).
