= Patrick Sweeney (rowing) =

British coxswain (born 1952)

Personal information
- Full name: Patrick John Sweeney
- Born: 12 August 1952 (age 73) London
- Height: 157 cm (5 ft 2 in)
- Weight: 50 kg (110 lb)

Sport
- Sport: Rowing
- Club: Leander Club
Medal record
Men's rowing
Representing Great Britain
Olympic Games
Silver medal – second place	1976 Montreal	Eight
Bronze medal – third place	1988 Seoul	Coxed pair
World Rowing Championships
Gold medal – first place	1977 Amsterdam	Lwt eight
Gold medal – first place	1986 Nottingham	Coxed pair
Silver medal – second place	1974 Lucerne	Eight
Silver medal – second place	1987 Copenhagen	Coxed pair

Patrick John Sweeney (born 12 August 1952) is a retired coxswain for Great Britain's rowing team. Sweeney competed at the 1972 Summer Olympics, 1976 Summer Olympics and the 1988 Summer Olympics.

== Rowing career ==
Sweeney won the coxed fours with Christopher Pierce, Hugh Matheson, Dick Findlay and Alan Almand, rowing for a Tideway Scullers and Leander composite, at the inaugural 1972 National Rowing Championships. The winning crew were then selected to represent Great Britain at the 1972 Olympics, Rooney Massara replaced Findlay in the men's coxed four event where the crew finished in tenth place after being knocked out in the semi-finals.

At the 1974 World Rowing Championships he coxed the eight to silver, a feat that was repeated at the 1976 Olympics when Sweeney coxed the eight during the 1976 Olympic rowing event. In between he was part of the coxed four at the 1975 World Rowing Championships in Nottingham, the four just missed out on a medal finishing in fourth place in the A final.

In 1977 he won his first gold medal at the 1977 and another gold medal was secured during the 1986 World Rowing Championships when he coxed Steve Redgrave and Andy Holmes in the coxed pairs. This crew then won an Olympic bronze medal at the 1988 Summer Olympics in the men's coxed pair.

== Coaching ==
Sweeney is also a rowing coach. He has coached the British National Team at World Championships and Olympics. Also at the Burnaby Lake Aquatic Center in Burnaby, British Columbia, Canada. He has served as head coach and director of training for the Belgian National Rowing team. In addition, he has coached several United States collegiate women's teams and has won four national collegiate titles. Sweeney currently coaches the Kansas State University women's team.

== Achievements ==
- Olympic medals: 1 silver, 1 bronze
- World Championship medals: 2 gold, 2 silver

=== Olympic Games ===
- 1988 – Bronze, coxed pair (with Steve Redgrave and Andy Holmes)
- 1976 – Silver, eight

=== World Championships ===
- 1987 – Silver, coxed pair (with Steve Redgrave and Andy Holmes)
- 1986 – Gold, coxed pairs (with Steve Redgrave and Andy Holmes)
- 1977 – Gold, men's lightweight eight
- 1974 – Silver men's eight
