= UTS Haberfield Rowing Club =

Australian rowing club

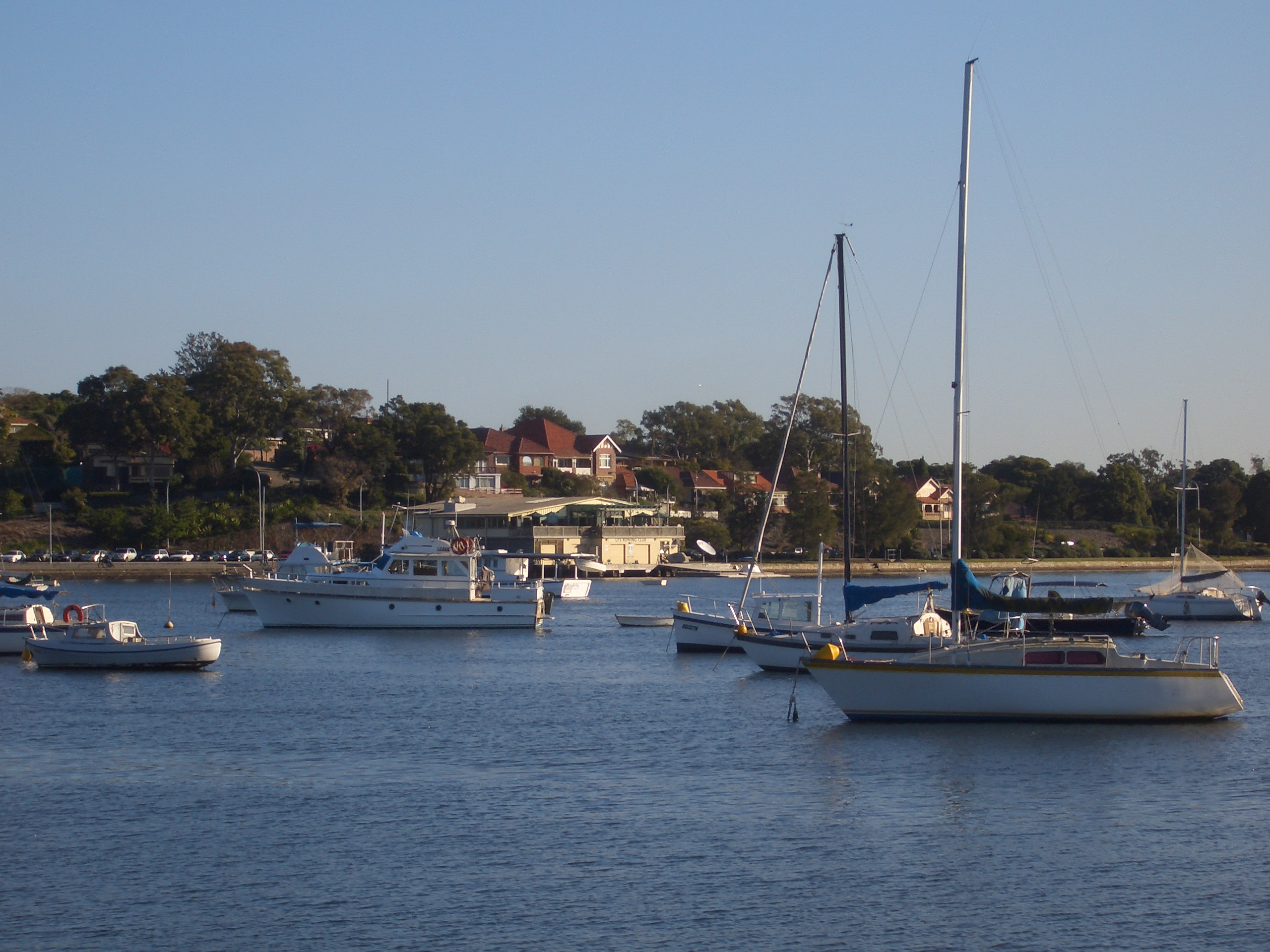
- Location: Dobroyd Point Sydney
- Home water: Iron Cove, Sydney Harbour
- Founded: 1925
- Affiliations: NSW Rowing Association
- Website: UTS Rowing

UTS Haberfield Rowing Club in Sydney was formed as Haberfield Rowing Club in 1925. It has occupied its current site on Port Jackson's, Iron Cove at Dobroyd Point since 1926. The club had a senior and lightweight Sydney premiership & national competition focus until 1992 when it became aligned with the University of Technology, Sydney and since then it has also been a varsity club. Its elite program has enjoyed great success since the 1990s with a number of the club's oarsmen and women making Australian Olympic selection since then.

== History ==
The Haberfield Rowing Club campus was formed by charter in 1925 but had some initial difficulties in getting council approval for its clubhouse site. In early 1926 it opened its £1,300 club house at Dobroyd Point. Early success on the river was attained due to the skilled coaching of Bern Williams, their captain, and the club finished second in the junior pennant in 1926/27 and second in both senior and junior pennants in the 1927/28 seasons. Throughout the 'thirties with Bernie Williams still as Head Coach the club had further success winning the junior pennant in 1930/31 and 1931/32 and second place in the club premiership in three consecutive seasons from 1930/31 onwards. Haberfield's greatest success came in 1938/39, when both the premiership and the junior pennant were won, and the performance was repeated in 1939/40.

Haberfield predominated in success on the river during the war years. The club won each of the substitute point score competitions which were held until 1947/48. This performance, coupled with the successes of 1938/39 and 1939/40 and of 1948/49, when the premiership and junior pennant competitions were reintroduced, led the NSW Rowing Association to state "[Haberfield] have thus set a record of supremacy in New South Wales rowing that is unequalled". At the 1948 Australian Rowing Championships, the NSW King's Cup winning eight was the entire Haberfield senior men's eight. The club continued its good standing throughout the 1950s with three more premiership wins, four seconds and two-thirds and six wins in the junior pennant. The 1960s also saw three premierships wins.

The University of Technology, Sydney was founded in Sydney in 1893 as the Sydney Technical College. From the early 1980s it was chartered as a full university and set about growing its student union capabilities and facilities. In 1992 the UTS Union sought an amalgamation with the Haberfield Rowing Club. The club has been known as UTS Haberfield Rowing Club (UTSHRC) since 1992. The merger saw an immediate benefit to the club in an increase in financial support and enabling the hire of Timothy McLaren as head coach. During McLaren's 15 years with UTSHRC from 1992 to 2007, thirteen UTS Haberfield rowers made Australian Olympic rowing selection at three Olympic Games winning eleven medals (ten bronze and one silver)

UTSHRC was awarded the New South Wales Institute of Sport's High Performance Centre of the Year Award in 1999 and 2001.

== Members ==
Notable past members include:

- Bern Williams, early club captain who took Haberfield to premiership success in the club's first decade of competition.
- Tim McLaren was the club's head coach from 1992 – 2007, drove its high-performance program and representative success.
- Dr. Dick Reddell maintained a dominance at varsity, club, national and masters levels in single and double sculls from the 1960s through to the 2010s.

Olympic representative members include:

- Kevyn Webb rowed in the double scull at Rome 1960.
- Vern Bowrey, John Lee and Philip Wilkinson rowed a coxed four at Munich 1972.
- Jennifer Luff competitor at Barcelona 1992 and Atlanta 1996.
- Stuart Welch silver medal winner in the men's eight Sydney 2000 and bronze medal winner in the same event at Athens 2004.
- James and Geoff Stewart bronze medal winners in the coxless four at Sydney 2000 and in the men's eight at Athens 2004.
- Stephen Stewart bronze medal winner in the men's eight at Athens 2004 and competitor at Beijing 2008.
- Dave Dennis of the men's coxless four at Athens 2004 and the men's eight at Beijing 2008.
- James Chapman was a UTS clubman when he made his 1st Olympic appearance in the eight at 2008 Beijing.
- Samuel Loch a member of the men's eight at Beijing 2008 and London 2012.
- Rod Chisolm competitor at Beijing 2008 in the lightweight coxless four and at London 2012 in the lightweight 2X.
- Georgina Rowe in the women's eight and Timothy Masters in the men's eight at Tokyo 2021.

World champions include:

- Catriona Roach in the women's lightweight 4x in 2001
- Julia Wilson in the women's 8+ in 2001
- Victoria Roberts in the women's 8+ in 2001
- Rod Chisolm in the men's lightweight 8+ in 2011.
