= Bjarne Pedersen (disambiguation) =

Bjarne Pedersen (born 1978) is a Danish motorcycle speedway rider.

Bjarne Pedersen may also refer to:

- Bjarne Pedersen (rower) (born 1944), Danish rower
- Bjarne Bent Rønne Pedersen (1935–1993), known as Bjarne Liller, Danish jazz musician and singer-songwriter

== See also ==
- Trygve Bjarne Pedersen (1884–1967), Norwegian sailor
