= Stadelmann =

Stadelmann is a German surname. Notable people with the surname include:

- Christian Stadelmann (1959–2019), German violinist
- Dylan Stadelmann (born 1989), Swiss footballer
- Hans Stadelmann (1941–1977), Swiss motorcycle racer
- Rainer Stadelmann (1933–2019), German Egyptologist
- Robert Stadelmann (born 1972), Austrian Nordic combined skier
- Rolf Stadelmann (born 1948), Swiss rower

== See also ==
- Stadelman
