= Bowrey =

Bowrey is a surname. Notable people with the name include:

- Bill Bowrey (born 1943), Australian tennis player
- Lesley Turner Bowrey, AM (born 1942), Australian professional tennis player
- Michelle Bowrey (born 1970), Australian professional tennis player
- Sally Bowrey, Australian journalist, TV news and weather presenter for the Seven Network
- Thomas Bowrey (1659–1713), English merchant and mariner involved in the East Indies trade
- Vern Bowrey (born 1948), Australian representative rowing coxswain
