= Alan Almand =

British rower

Personal information
- Other names: Willy Almand
- Nationality: British
- Born: 19 March 1943 (age 83) Hendon, Middlesex

Sport
- Sport: Rowing

Alan Almand (born 19 March 1943), also known as Willy Almand, is a retired British rower. He competed at the 1972 Summer Olympics.

Almand won the coxed fours with Christopher Pierce, Hugh Matheson, Dick Findlay and Patrick Sweeney, rowing for a Tideway Scullers and Leander composite, at the inaugural 1972 National Rowing Championships. The winning crew were then selected to represent Great Britain at the 1972 Olympics, Rooney Massara replaced Findlay in the men's coxed four event where the crew finished in tenth place after being knocked out in the semi-finals.
