= Michael Conway =

Michael Conway may refer to:

- Michael Conway (Emmerdale), a fictional character from the British soap opera Emmerdale
- Michael Conway (hurler), hurler with the Kerry county team
- Michael Conway (senator), Irish senator in 1938
- Michael Conway (Irish nationalist politician) (1844–?), Irish nationalist politician and teacher
- Michael Conway (rowing) (born 1953), Canadian Olympic coxswain
- Mike Conway (American football), American football coach
- Mike Conway (born 1983), racing driver
- Michael Conway (British Army officer), Director General of the Army Legal Services Branch
- Micky Conway (born 1956), English footballer

== See also ==
- Michael Conway Baker (born 1937), Canadian composer and music educator
