= Gerhard Auer =

German rower (1943–2019)

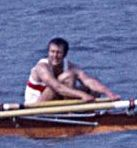
- Auer (seat 2) at the 1971 European Rowing Championships

Personal information
- Born: 29 June 1943 Tepl
- Died: 21 September 2019 (aged 76) Rodalben

Sport
- Sport: Rowing
Medal record
Men's rowing
Representing West Germany
Olympic Games
Gold medal – first place	1972 Munich	Coxed four
World Rowing Championships
Gold medal – first place	1970 St. Catharines	Coxed four
European Rowing Championships
Gold medal – first place	1969 Klagenfurt	Coxed four
Gold medal – first place	1971 Copenhagen	Coxed four

Gerhard Auer (29 June 1943 – 21 September 2019) was a German rower who competed for West Germany in the 1972 Summer Olympics.

Auer was born in Tepl. He competed at the 1970 World Rowing Championships in St. Catharines in the coxed four and won gold. He was a crew member of the West German boat which won the gold medal in the coxed fours event at the 1972 Summer Olympics in Munich.
