= Peter Berger (rower) =

German rower (born 1949)

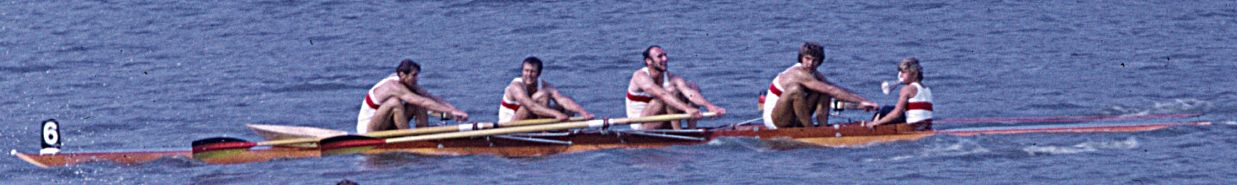
- Berger (stroke seat) at the 1971 European Rowing Championships

Personal information
- Born: 16 October 1949 (age 76) Konstanz, West Germany
- Height: 196 cm (6 ft 5 in)
- Weight: 104 kg (229 lb)

Sport
- Sport: Rowing
- Club: RV Neptun
Medal record
Men's rowing
Representing West Germany
Olympic Games
Gold medal – first place	1972 Munich	Coxed four
World Rowing Championships
Gold medal – first place	1970 St. Catharines	Coxed four
European Rowing Championships
Gold medal – first place	1969 Klagenfurt	Coxed four
Gold medal – first place	1971 Copenhagen	Coxed four

Peter Berger (born 16 October 1949) is a German rower who competed for West Germany in the 1968 Summer Olympics and in the 1972 Summer Olympics.

He was born in Konstanz.

In 1968 he was a crew member of the West German boat which finished twelfth in the coxed four event. He competed at the 1970 World Rowing Championships in St. Catharines in the coxed four and won gold. He competed at the 1971 European Rowing Championships and won a gold medal with the coxed four. In 1972 he won the gold medal with the West German boat in the coxed four competition.
