= Jens Lindhardt =

Danish rower (born 1946)

Personal information
- Nationality: Danish
- Born: 23 September 1946 (age 80) Copenhagen, Denmark

Sport
- Sport: Rowing

Jens Lindhardt (born 23 September 1946) is a Danish rower. He competed in the men's coxed four event at the 1972 Summer Olympics.
