= Charles Ruthford =

American rower

Personal information
- Born: September 26, 1950 (age 76) Yakima, Washington, United States

Sport
- Sport: Rowing

Charles Ruthford (born September 26, 1950) is an American rower.

== Career ==
He competed in the men's coxed four event at the 1972 Summer Olympics.
