= James Walker (rower) =

Canadian rower

Personal information
- Born: 21 January 1949 (age 77) Hamilton, Ontario, Canada

Sport
- Sport: Rowing

James Walker (born 21 January 1949) is a Canadian rower. He competed in the men's coxed four event at the 1972 Summer Olympics.
