= Wim Grothuis =

Dutch rower

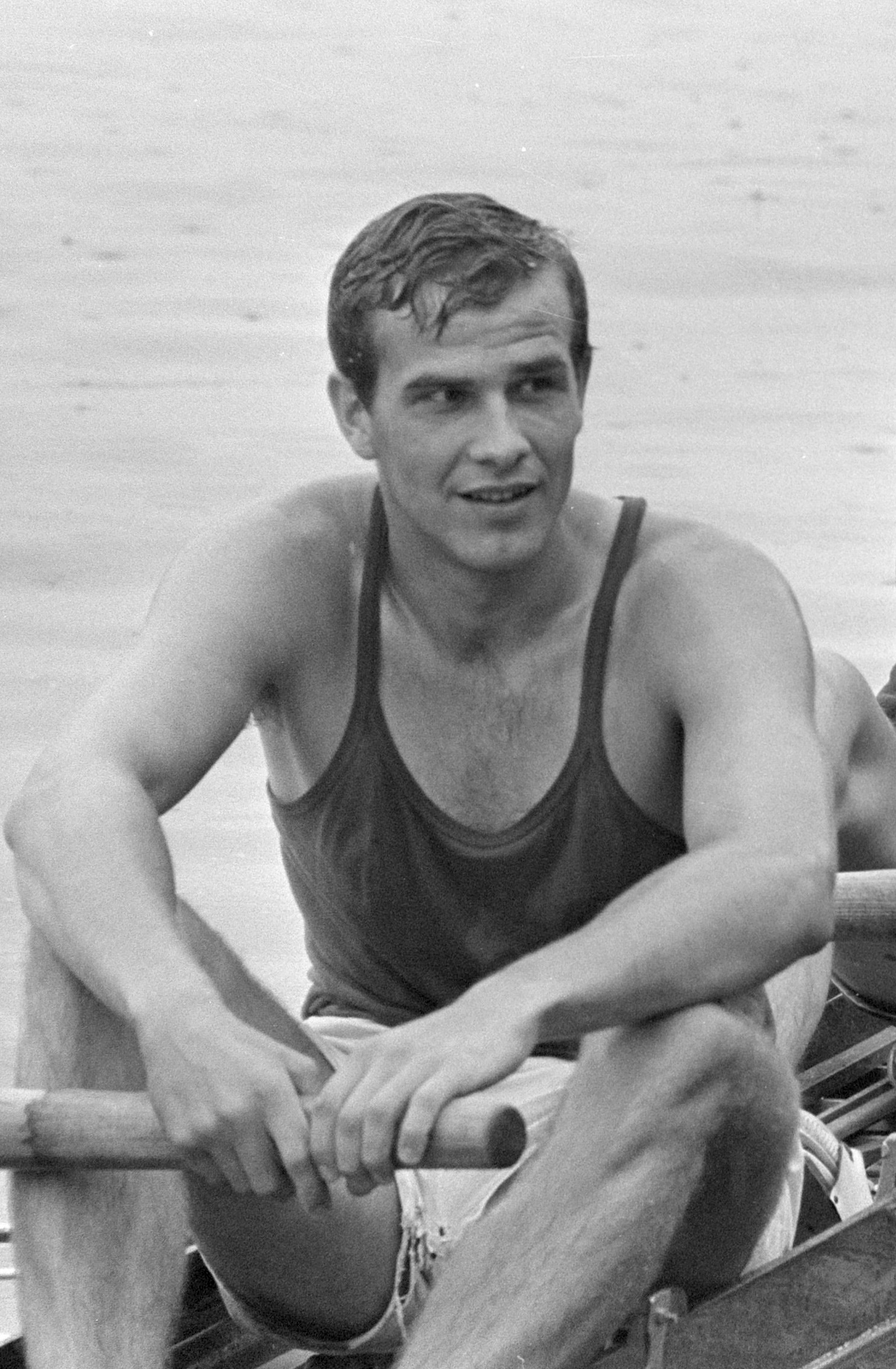
- Wim Grothuis in 1971

Personal information
- Born: 16 December 1944 (age 81) Amsterdam, the Netherlands
- Height: 1.87 m (6 ft 2 in)
- Weight: 86 kg (190 lb)

Sport
- Sport: Rowing
- Club: Laga, Delft

Willem Theo "Wim" Grothuis (born 16 December 1944) is a retired Dutch rower. He competed at the 1972 Summer Olympics in the coxed fours, together with Evert Kroes, Jan-Willem van Woudenberg, Johan ter Haar and Kees de Korver, and finished in seventh place. His team finished ninth in this event at the 1971 European Championships.
