= Rolf Jobst =

East German rower

Personal information
- Born: 31 March 1951 (age 75) Ebersbach, East Germany
- Died: 27 January 2020 (aged 68) Berlin, Germany
- Height: 190 cm (6 ft 3 in)
- Weight: 83 kg (183 lb)

Sport
- Sport: Rowing
- Club: SV Dynamo / SC Dynamo Berlin
Medal record
Men's rowing
Representing East Germany
Olympic Games
Silver medal – second place	1972 Munich	Coxed four
World Rowing Championships
Gold medal – first place	1970 St. Catharines	Eight
European Rowing Championships
Silver medal – second place	1971 Copenhagen	Eight
Silver medal – second place	1973 Moscow	Coxed four

Rolf Jobst (31 March 1951 – 27 January 2020) was a German rower, who competed for the SC Dynamo Berlin / Sportvereinigung (SV) Dynamo. He won medals at international rowing competitions, including the 1972 Summer Olympics.
