= František Provazník =

Czech rower and photographer

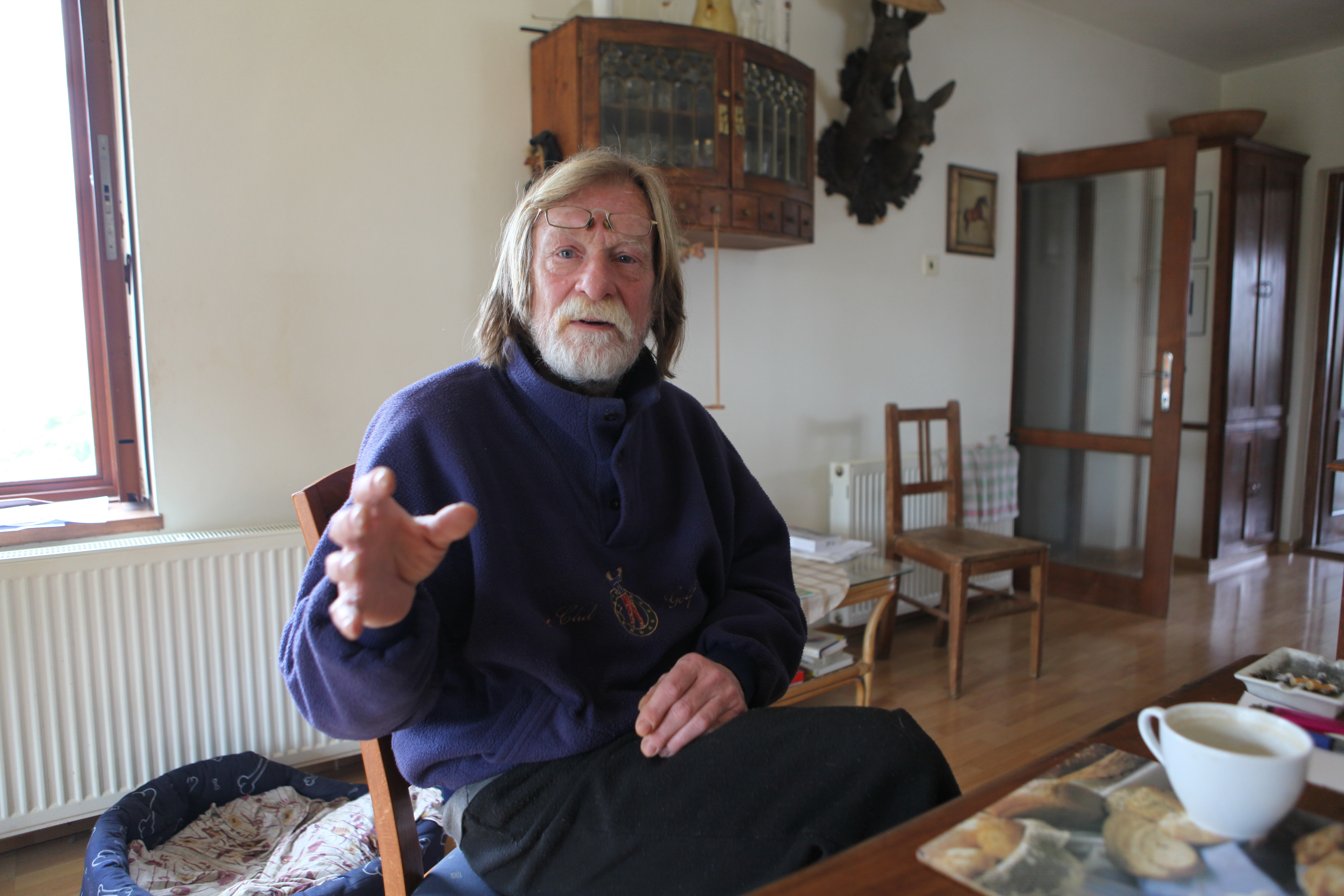
- Provazník in 2013

Personal information
- Born: 7 February 1948 (age 78) Prague
- Occupation: Photographer

Sport
- Sport: Rowing
Medal record
Men's rowing
Representing Czechoslovakia
Olympic Games
Bronze medal – third place	1972 Munich	Coxed four
European Rowing Championships
Bronze medal – third place	1973 Moscow	Coxed four

František Provazník (born 7 February 1948 in Prague) is a Czech rower who competed for Czechoslovakia in the 1972 Summer Olympics. He is also known as a photographer, under the name Franta Provaznik.

In 1972 he was a crew member of the Czechoslovak boat which won the bronze medal in the coxed four event.

The National Portrait Gallery, London holds portraits by Provaznik of Archbishop Robert Runcie and novelists Susan Hill and John le Carre. Wikimedia Commons holds examples of his art photography.
