= Chad Rudolph =

American rower (born 1948)

Personal information
- Born: January 22, 1948 (age 78) Seattle, Washington, United States

Sport
- Sport: Rowing

Chad Rudolph (born January 22, 1948) is an American rower. He competed in the men's coxed four event at the 1972 Summer Olympics.
