= Mogens Holm =

Danish rower

Personal information
- Nationality: Danish
- Born: 10 February 1941 (age 85)

Sport
- Sport: Rowing

Mogens Holm (born 10 February 1941) is a Danish rower. He competed in the men's coxed four event at the 1972 Summer Olympics.
