= Robert Cunliffe (rower) =

Canadian rower

Personal information
- Nationality: Canadian
- Born: 16 December 1950 (age 75) Vancouver, British Columbia, Canada

Sport
- Sport: Rowing

Robert Cunliffe (born 16 December 1950) is a Canadian rower. He competed in the men's coxed four event at the 1972 Summer Olympics.
