= Henk Elzerman =

Dutch swimmer (born 1958)

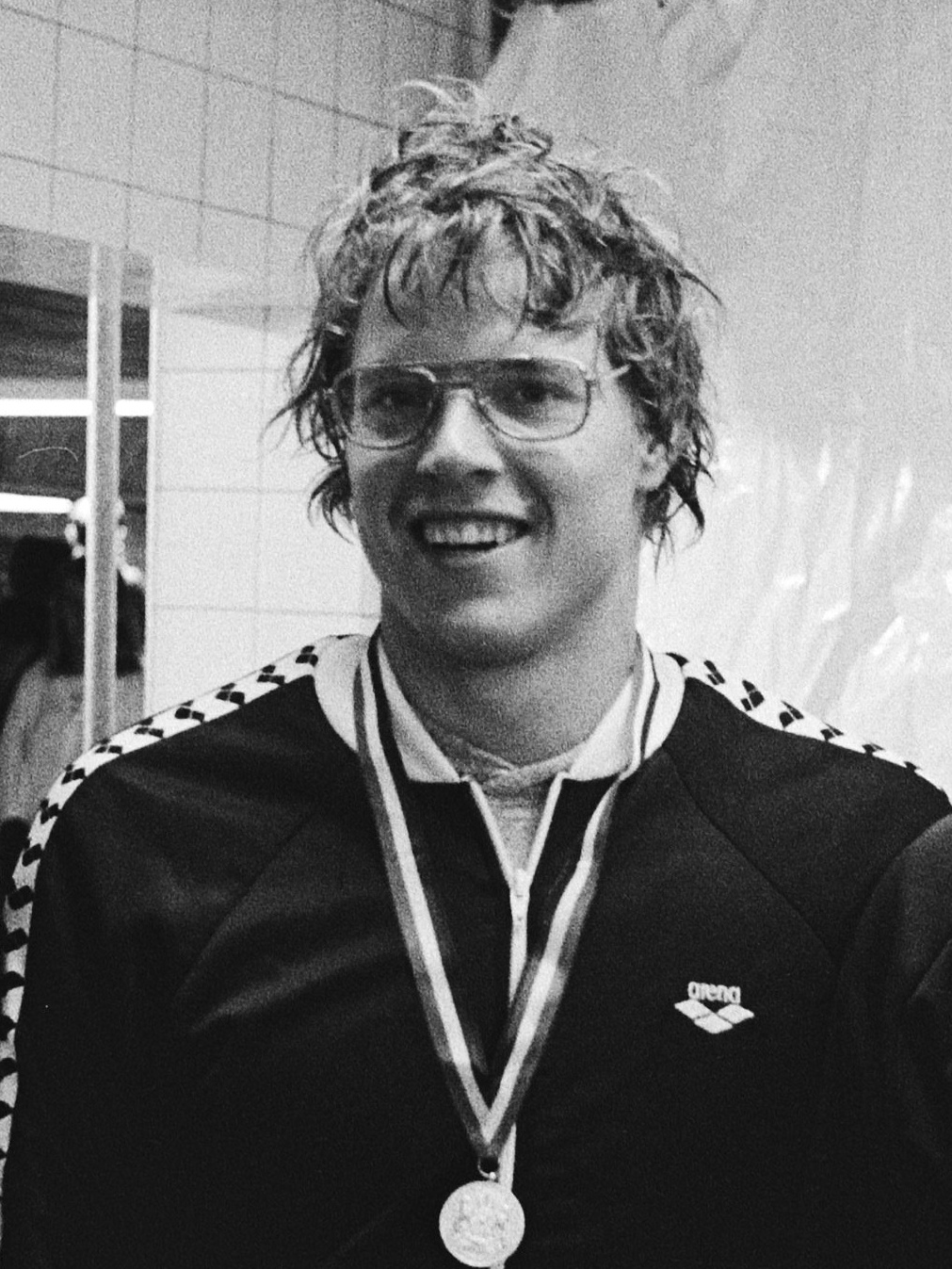
- Henk Elzerman in 1979

Personal information
- Born: 18 September 1958 (age 67) The Hague, the Netherlands

Sport
- Sport: Swimming
- Club: ZIAN, Den Haag

Hendrik "Henk" Elzerman (born 18 September 1958) is a former freestyle swimmer from the Netherlands, who competed for his native country at the 1976 Summer Olympics in Montreal, Quebec, Canada. There he was eliminated in the qualifying heats of the 400 m and 1500 m freestyle. As a member of the Dutch Relay Team, he finished in sixth position (7:42.56) of the 4 × 200 m freestyle. Both his elder sister Josien and brother Hans were international competitive swimmers, who represented the Netherlands at the 1972 Summer Olympics.

Between 1975 and 1977 he set more than 20 national records in the 200–1500 m freestyle events.
