= Peter Lindsay (rowing) =

New Zealand rower

Personal information
- Born: 10 October 1951 (age 73); Oamaru, New Zealand
- Height: 161 cm (5 ft 3 in)

Sport
- Sport: Rowing
- Club: Oamaru Rowing Club

Peter Stuart Lindsay (born 10 October 1951) is a New Zealand coxswain. He competed at the 1972 Summer Olympics in Munich with the men's coxed four where they came sixth.
