= Dietrich Zander =

German rower (born 1951)

Personal information
- Born: 2 July 1951 (age 74) East Berlin, East Germany

Sport
- Sport: Rowing
Medal record
Men's rowing
Representing East Germany
Olympic Games
Silver medal – second place	1972 Munich	Coxed four
World Rowing Championships
Gold medal – first place	1970 St. Catharines	Eight
European Rowing Championships
Silver medal – second place	1971 Copenhagen	Eight
Silver medal – second place	1973 Moscow	Coxed four

Dietrich Zander (born 2 July 1951 in East Berlin) is a German rower. He competed for the SC Dynamo Berlin / Sportvereinigung (SV) Dynamo and won medals at international rowing competitions.
