= Eckhard Martens =

East German rower

Personal information
- Born: 12 June 1951 (age 75) Bützow, East Germany
- Height: 191 cm (6 ft 3 in)
- Weight: 94 kg (207 lb)

Sport
- Sport: Rowing
Medal record
Men's rowing
Representing East Germany
Olympic Games
Silver medal – second place	1972 Munich	Coxed four
World Rowing Championships
Gold medal – first place	1970 St. Catharines	Eight
European Rowing Championships
Silver medal – second place	1971 Copenhagen	Eight
Silver medal – second place	1973 Moscow	Coxed four

Eckhard Martens (born 12 June 1951) is a German rower. He competed for the SC Dynamo Berlin / Sportvereinigung (SV) Dynamo and won medals at international rowing competitions.
