= Alberto Cecchi =

Italian rower

Personal information
- Nationality: Italian
- Born: 13 September 1943 (age 82)

Sport
- Sport: Rowing

Alberto Cecchi (born 13 September 1943) is an Italian former rower. He competed in the men's coxed four event at the 1972 Summer Olympics.
