= Jørgen Cappelen =

Norwegian rower (born 1959)

Personal information
- Nationality: Norwegian
- Born: 2 February 1959 (age 67) Oslo, Norway

Sport
- Sport: Rowing

Jørgen Cappelen (born 2 February 1959) is a Norwegian rower. He competed in the men's coxed four event at the 1972 Summer Olympics.
