= Jan-Willem van Woudenberg =

Dutch rower

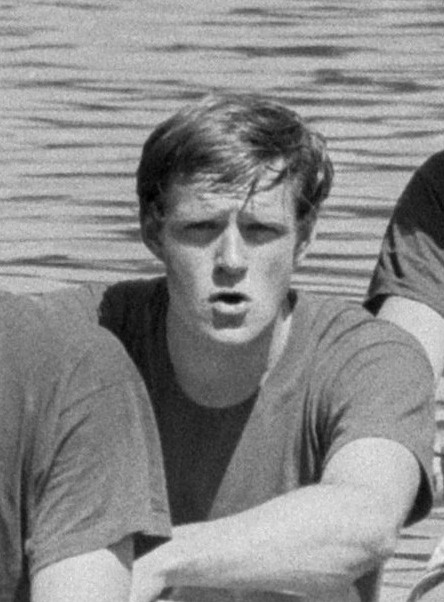
- Jan-Willem van Woudenberg in 1971

Personal information
- Born: 16 February 1948 (age 78) Atambua, Indonesia
- Height: 1.87 m (6 ft 2 in)
- Weight: 85 kg (187 lb)

Sport
- Sport: Rowing
- Club: Laga, Delft

Jan Willem "Jan-Willem" van Woudenberg (born 16 February 1948) is a retired Dutch rower. He competed at the 1972 Summer Olympics in the coxed fours, together with Evert Kroes, Wim Grothuis, Johan ter Haar and Kees de Korver, and finished in seventh place. His team finished ninth in this event at the 1971 European Championships. His brother Gert Jan van Woudenberg competed in the same event at the 1976 Olympics.
