= David Sawyier =

American rower (1951–2019)

Personal information
- Full name: David Robertson Sawyier
- Born: February 2, 1951 Chicago, Illinois, United States
- Died: July 16, 2019 (aged 68)

Sport
- Sport: Rowing

David Robertson Sawyier (February 2, 1951 – June 10, 2019) was an American rower. He competed in the men's coxed four event at the 1972 Summer Olympics. He graduated from Harvard University.

Sawyier subsequently attended Christ Church College, Oxford University. He rowed in the Boat Race in 1973 and 1974 and was Captain of the O.U.B.C.
