= Hanspeter Lüthi =

Swiss rower

Personal information
- Nationality: Swiss
- Born: 27 April 1944 (age 82)

Sport
- Sport: Rowing

Hanspeter Lüthi (born 27 April 1944) is a Swiss rower. He competed in the men's coxed four event at the 1972 Summer Olympics.
