= Hugh Matheson (rower) =

British rower (born 1949)

Personal information
- Full name: Hugh Patrick Matheson
- Nationality: British
- Born: 16 April 1949 (age 77) Ormiston near Hawick, Scotland
Medal record
Men's rowing
Representing Great Britain
Olympic Games
Silver medal – second place	1976 Montreal	Eight
World Rowing Championships
Silver medal – second place	1974 Lucerne	Eight

Hugh Patrick Matheson (born 16 April 1949) at Ormiston near Hawick, Scotland is a retired British landowner, journalist, and (in his youth) international rower who competed in the 1972 Summer Olympics, in the 1976 Summer Olympics, and in the 1980 Summer Olympics. He is the great grandson of Hugh Matheson (industrialist). He graduated with a BSc (Econ) from Queen Mary University of London and MA in agricultural economics from University of Leeds.

== Early life ==
He grew up on a windy hillside near Hawick in the Scottish Borders. His formative experience was to find himself in Prague on the night of 20th August 1968, when the combined armies of the Warsaw Pact invaded Czechoslovakia to suppress the ‘Prague Spring’ of measured resistance to the colonial powers, then exercised over it by the Soviet Union. He and a friend joined a group of students, led by Olda Černý, who began to produce a mimeographed, ad hoc, daily newssheet called ‘Student’, which aimed to correct the official publication of the Communist Party of Czechoslovakia, Rudé Právo, and to inform the public in the Czech capital of the gradual extinction of the passive resistance movement.

== Rowing ==
Member of British national team from 1967 (junior) to 1980 competing in the 1972, 1976 & 1980 Summer Olympics. Winner of plenty of unimportant races and loser of the only two which counted. Trained under Bohumil Janoušek, a Czech refugee who came to Britain as national coach in 1969.

In 1972, Matheson won the coxed fours with Christopher Pierce, Alan Almand, Dick Findlay and Patrick Sweeney, rowing for a Tideway Scullers and Leander composite, at the inaugural National Rowing Championships. The winning crew were then selected to represent Great Britain at the 1972 Olympics men's coxed four event where the crew finished in tenth place after being knocked out in the semi-finals. In 1974 he was a member of the British eight which won the silver medal at the Lucerne World Championships and was selected by Great Britain as part of the coxed four at the 1975 World Rowing Championships in Nottingham, the four just missed out on a medal finishing in fourth place in the A final.

The following year he later competed at his second Olympic Games at the 1976 Montreal Olympic Games, where he won the silver medal with the British boat in the eights competition. In 1978 he won the singles sculls at the 1978 British Rowing Championships, rowing for the Thames Tradesmen's Rowing Club.

In 1979, Matheson won the Diamond Challenge Sculls (the premier singles sculls event) at the Henley Royal Regatta, rowing for the Nottingham Rowing Club.

== Coaching ==
He coached the Oxford Boat Race crews 1974–1987, in harness with Daniel Topolski, won 10 lost 1. After retirement from competition he also coached, in harness with Ian Wilson and Mark Lees, the Nottinghamshire County Rowing Association which had twenty five years of success at World level including lightweight men's World Champion crews and elite success all over Europe.

== Writing and broadcasting ==
Joined The Independent at its foundation in 1986 and wrote about rowing and regattas for twenty years. Started broadcasting Olympic rowing commentary for British Eurosport in 1996. In 2018, co-wrote with Christopher Dodd the only, so far, biography of Jürgen Gröbler, the most successful coach from any nation in any sport in Olympic history.

== Personal life ==
After sitting next to a distant cousin for the first time at an embassy dinner party in 1975, he was appointed by her to inherit the life tenancy of the Pierrepont family estate at Thoresby Hall, one of the Dukeries in Nottinghamshire. As the youngest child, of the youngest child, of the youngest child of the settlor of the estates his inheritance came, most unusually, by ultimogeniture. At Thoresby he farmed, forested and enjoyed the management of a large, well endowed landscape, which includes the biggest remnant of the ancient woodland of Sherwood Forest. His chief contribution was to extract the family and its chattels, from the 8500m 2 of Anthony Salvin’s 1878 Thoresby Hall and build a 2000m 2 house on a new site 1km away. The Laxton, Nottinghamshire estate, the last remaining village in Britain with a legally functioning manorial court, which had been a Pierrepont property for 300 years until 1953, when it was sold for death duties, was bought back from the Crown Estate in the week before his retirement in 2020.

Away from Thoresby he became between 1993 and 2008 first a Governor and later Chairman of Governors for Portland College, a national Further Education college for disabled students.

In 1993 he joined the East Midlands Regional Committee of the National Trust, becoming its chairman in 1998. He was elected to the Council of the National Trust (2000–2010) before joining two other trustees to sit with Lord Blakenham on the Governance Review, which was enacted in 2001. He joined the new NT trustee board as soon as it was established. Once there he served on the investment and nominations committees.

He has been a trustee of the Grimsthorpe and Drummond Castles Trust, a charity which owns a large Lincolnshire estate and two historic castles that are held for public benefit.

He was High Sheriff of Nottinghamshire in 1997 and a Deputy Lieutenant of Nottinghamshire from 2004. He has served as a trustee on the Sports Aid Foundation (1981–1990) and as a governor of William Ellis School, an all boys school on the south east corner of Hampstead Heath since 2022.

== Publications ==
- Matheson, Hugh; Dodd, Christopher (2018). More Power:The Story of Jurgen Grobler. HQ. ISBN 9780008217815.
