= Tom Welo =

Norwegian rower

Personal information
- Nationality: Norwegian
- Born: 23 September 1947 (age 77); Oslo, Norway

Sport
- Sport: Rowing

Tom Welo (born 23 September 1947) is a Norwegian former rower. He competed in the men's coxed four event at the 1972 Summer Olympics.
