= Pasquale Chiabai =

Italian rower

Personal information
- Nationality: Italian
- Born: 21 April 1946 (age 80)

Sport
- Sport: Rowing

Pasquale Chiabai (born 21 April 1946) is an Italian rower. He competed in the men's coxed four event at the 1972 Summer Olympics.
