= Otakar Mareček =

Czechoslovak rower (1943–2020)

Personal information
- Born: 14 June 1943 Prague, Protectorate of Bohemia and Moravia
- Died: 25 January 2020 (aged 76)

Sport
- Sport: Rowing
Medal record
Men's rowing
Representing Czechoslovakia
Bronze medal – third place	1972 Munich	Coxed four
European Championships
Bronze medal – third place	1963 Copenhagen	Eight
Bronze medal – third place	1965 Duisburg	Coxed four
Bronze medal – third place	1973 Moscow	Coxed four

Otakar Mareček (14 June 1943 – 25 January 2020) was a Czech rower who competed for Czechoslovakia in the 1968 Summer Olympics, in the 1972 Summer Olympics, and in the 1976 Summer Olympics.

He was born in Prague. In 1968 he was a crew member of the Czechoslovak boat which finished fifth in the eight event. Four years later he won the bronze medal with the Czechoslovak boat in the coxed four competition. At the 1976 Games he was part of the Czechoslovak boat which finished fourth in the coxed four contest.

Mareček chaired the Czech Rowing Union from 1988 to 1996, and also served on the Czech Olympic Committee. He died, aged 76, on 25 January 2020.
