= Stadelman =

Stadelman is a surname. Notable people with the surname include:

- Peter J. Stadelman (1871–1954), American businessman and politician
- Steve Stadelman (born 1960), American politician

== See also ==
- Stadelmann
