= John Clark (New Zealand rower) =

New Zealand rower

Personal information
- Birth name: John Wilson Clark
- Nationality: New Zealand
- Born: 9 July 1944 (age 80); Wellington, New Zealand
- Height: 191 cm (6 ft 3 in)

John Wilson Clark (born 9 July 1944) is a New Zealand rower.

Clark was born in 1944 in Wellington, New Zealand. He was a member of Wellington Rowing Club and the Tauranga Rowing Club. He represented New Zealand at the 1972 Summer Olympics. He is listed as New Zealand Olympian athlete number 265 by the New Zealand Olympic Committee.
