= Peter Prijdekker =

Dutch swimmer

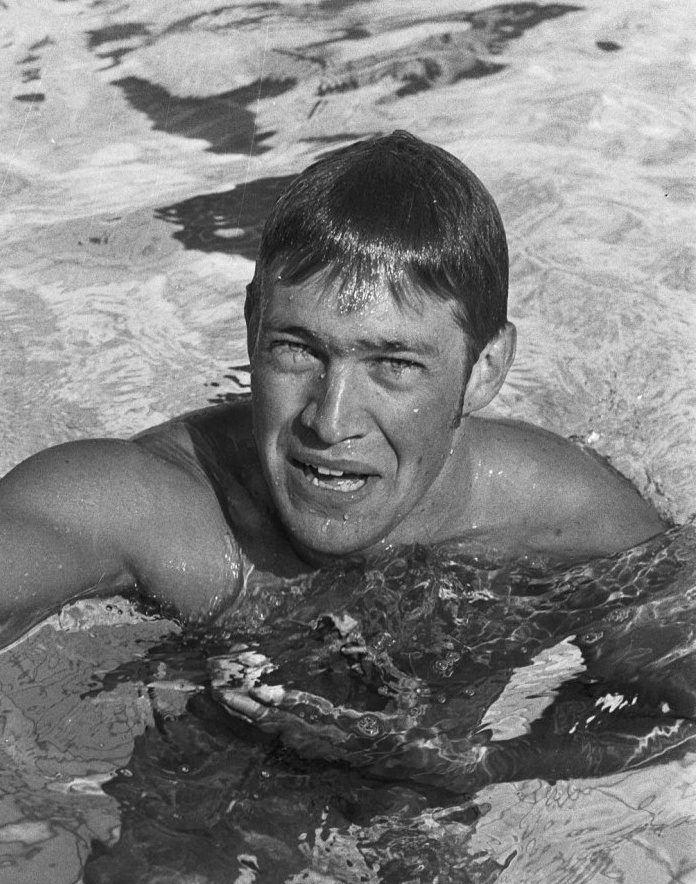
- Peter Prijdekker in 1971

Personal information
- Born: 22 June 1948 (age 78) Woerden, the Netherlands
- Height: 1.96 m (6 ft 5 in)
- Weight: 88 kg (194 lb)

Sport
- Sport: Swimming
- Club: ZIAN, Den Haag

Peter Cornelis Prijdekker (born 22 June 1948) is a former swimmer from the Netherlands. He competed at the 1972 Summer Olympics, where he was eliminated in the heats of the 200 m, 4 × 100 m and the 4 × 200 m freestyle events.

He grew up in South Africa, but moved to the Netherlands to be able to participate in the Olympic Games, in the time when South Africa was banned by the IOC. After retirement from senior swimming he competed in the masters category. He also took part in five Gay Games winning at least 18 gold medals. He is gay, and was banished by his swimming club after his partner died of AIDS. He then moved to London, where in 2007, together with Tim Denyer, he founded the Red Top Swim company, where he works as a swimming coach.
