= Bert Bergsma =

Dutch swimmer

Personal information
- Born: August 12, 1955 (age 70) Apeldoorn, Gelderland, Netherlands

Sport
- Sport: Swimming

Bert Bergsma (born 12 August 1955) is a former freestyle swimmer from the Netherlands, who competed for his native country at the 1972 Summer Olympics in Munich, West Germany. There he was eliminated as a member (second swimmer) of the Dutch relay teams, in the 4 × 100 m freestyle and the 4 × 200 m freestyle.
