= Vladimir Solovyov (rower) =

Soviet rower

Personal information
- Born: 21 November 1946 (age 78); Leningrad, Russian SFSR, Soviet Union
- Height: 187 cm (6 ft 2 in)
- Weight: 95 kg (209 lb)

Sport
- Sport: Rowing

Vladimir Nikolayevich Solovyov (Russian: Владимир Николаевич Соловьёв; born 21 November 1946) is a Soviet rower from Russia. He competed at the 1972 Summer Olympics in Munich with the men's coxed four where they came fourth.
