= Pierre Wind =

Dutch chef (born 1965)

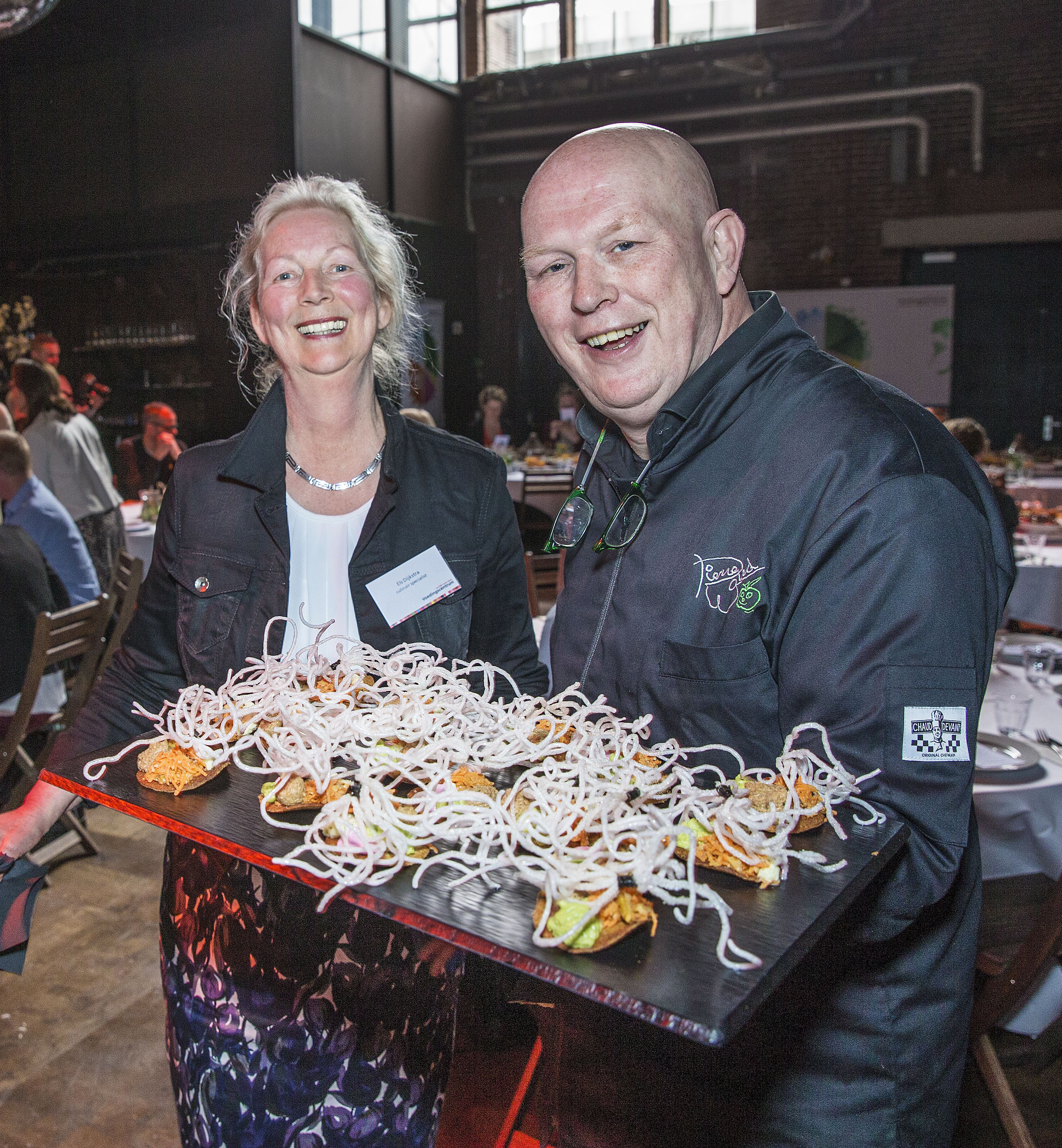
- Born: Petrus Marinus Maria Pierre Wind; 24 March 1965 (age 60); The Hague, Netherlands
- Culinary career
- Cooking style: Dutch
- Rating(s): Michelin Stars The Good Food Guide
- Current restaurants: Hoftrammm; Tramrestaurant
- Website: www.pierrewind.nl

Petrus Marinus Maria (Pierre) Wind (The Hague, 24 March 1965) is a Dutch cook who became well-known via his cooking shows. In 1997, producer Henriette Theunissen discovered him, and started the series De Eetfabriek (NPS) (1997-2000) with Wind as presenter, aided by Jahaga Bosscha.

== Early life ==
Wind grew up in The Hague. He went to MAVO and then completed a cooking course at Lagere technische school (LTS). He obtained various professional diplomas and certificates and followed a course in Amsterdam.

== Career ==
On 28 August 2017, Wind announced that his tram restaurant, which previously existed as a mobile restaurant in the Hague would move to a permanent location in the city.

On 8 May 2020, Wind started a corona cooking line and answered all questions in connection with cuisine. After the pandemic lockdown began, he received many questions and queries via social media from people who wanted to continue eating healthily during the lockdown. He set up a separate telephone line to better channel these questions.

He worked in Michelin star businesses such as Seinpost, Saur, and Princess Juliana.

He became chef and co-owner of restaurant De Nas.

He worked as a Lecturer at the Francois Vatelschool on beverage science.

== Publications ==
- Als schrijvers koken (1998)
- Wind aan de kook (1999); kookboek
- Wind in de eetfabriek (2000)
- Lekkâh! (2004); kookboek met illustraties van Haagse Harry.
- WAM (2005) ("Wind Afval Methode")
- De wondere wereld van een keukenkoning (2006)
- Patatje oorlog (2008); in samenwerking met Bart Chabot
- Het smaakpretpark (2009)
