= Roger van Hamburg =

Dutch swimmer (born 1954)

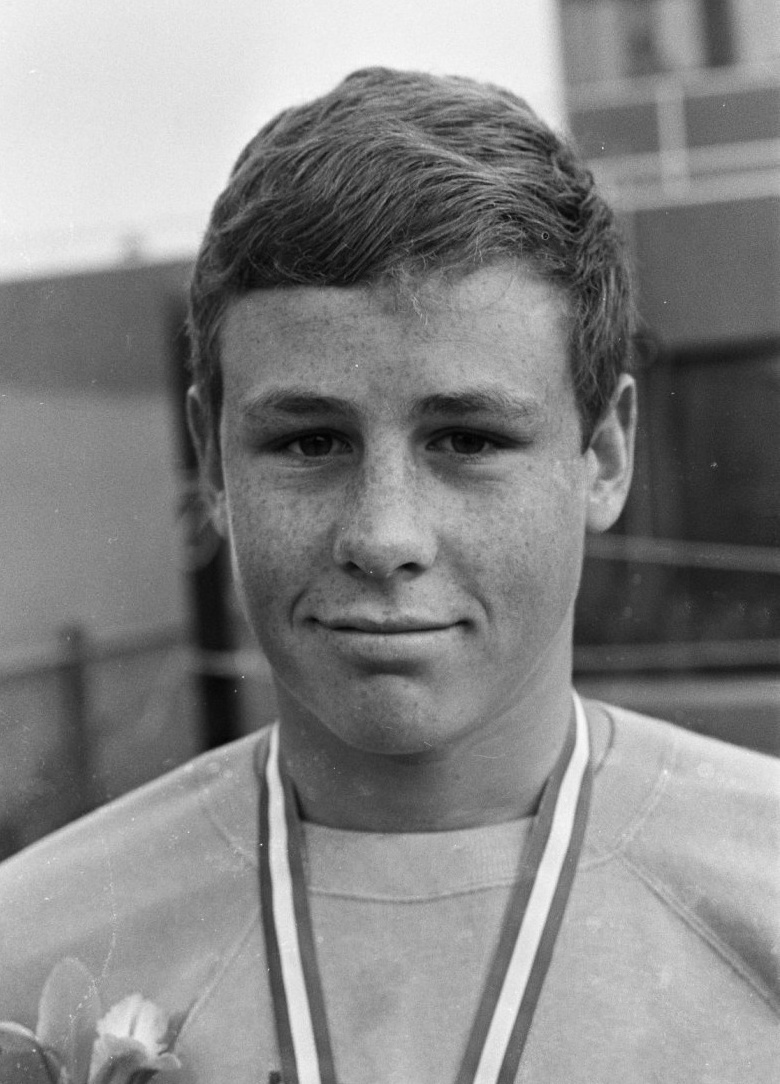
- Roger van Hamburg in 1968

Personal information
- Born: 5 April 1954 (age 72) Cardón, Venezuela
- Height: 1.88 m (6 ft 2 in)
- Weight: 81 kg (179 lb)

Sport
- Sport: Swimming
- Club: VZC, Vlaardingen

Roger Hendrik van Hamburg (born 5 April 1954) is a former freestyle and medley swimmer from the Netherlands, who competed for his home country at the 1972 Summer Olympics. There he was eliminated in the heats of the 400 m individual medley and 4 × 100 m and 4 × 200 m freestyle relays.

He is married to Diana Rickard, an Australian Olympic swimmer. They have a daughter, Sasha, who is married to Adam Pine, also an Australian Olympic swimmer. Since about 2000, Roger and Diana run a swimming school near Sydney, Australia.
