= Gerda Lassooij =

Dutch swimmer (born 1952)

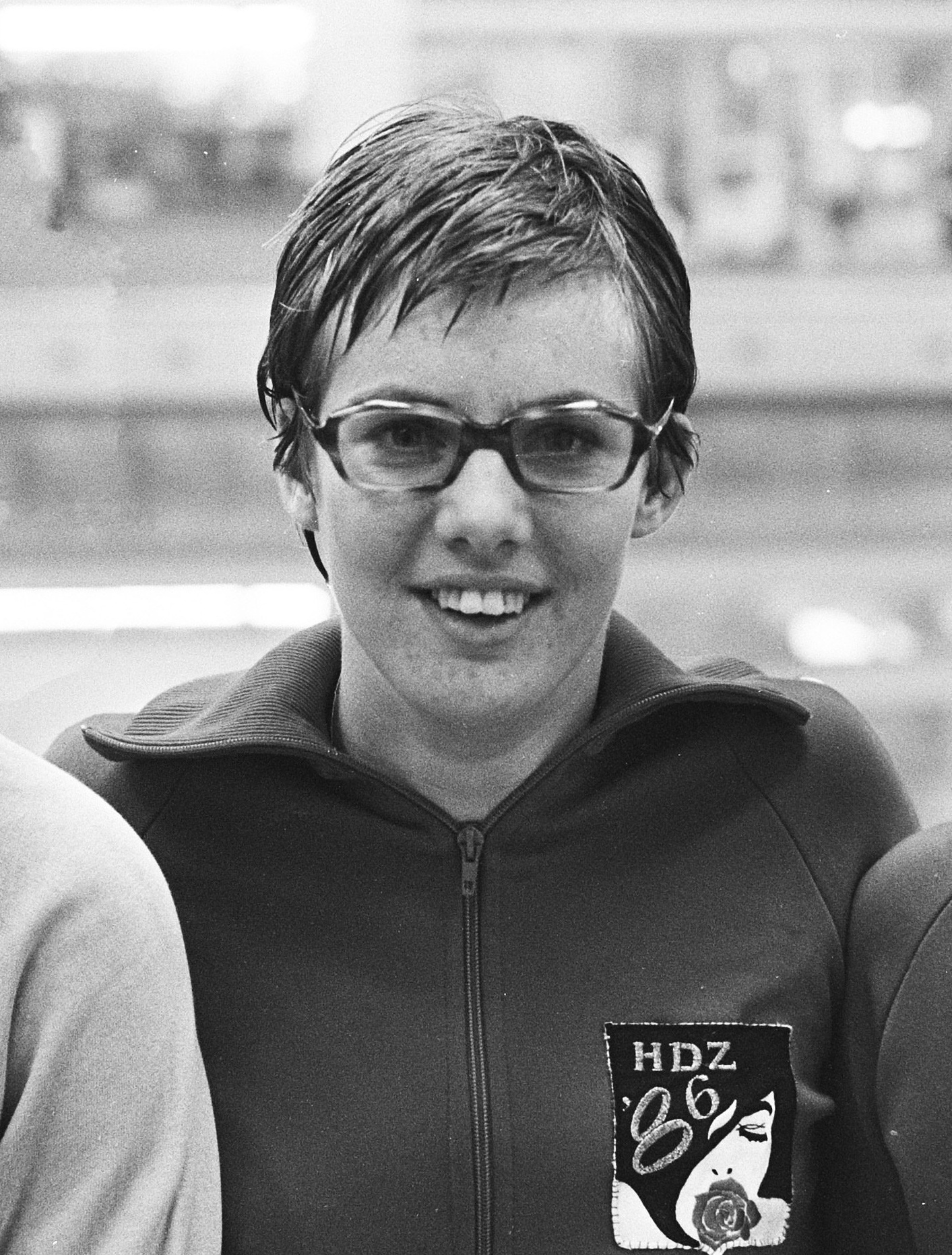
- Gerda Lassooij in 1970

Personal information
- Born: 22 August 1952 (age 73) Amsterdam, Netherlands

Sport
- Sport: Swimming
- Club: HDZ, Amsterdam

Gerarda "Gerda" Hendrica Maria Lassooij (born 22 August 1952) is a retired Dutch swimmer. She competed at the 1972 Summer Olympics in the 200 m and 400 m individual medley events, but failed to reach the finals.

After marriage she changed her last name to Nolting.
