= Josien Elzerman =

Dutch swimmer (born 1956)

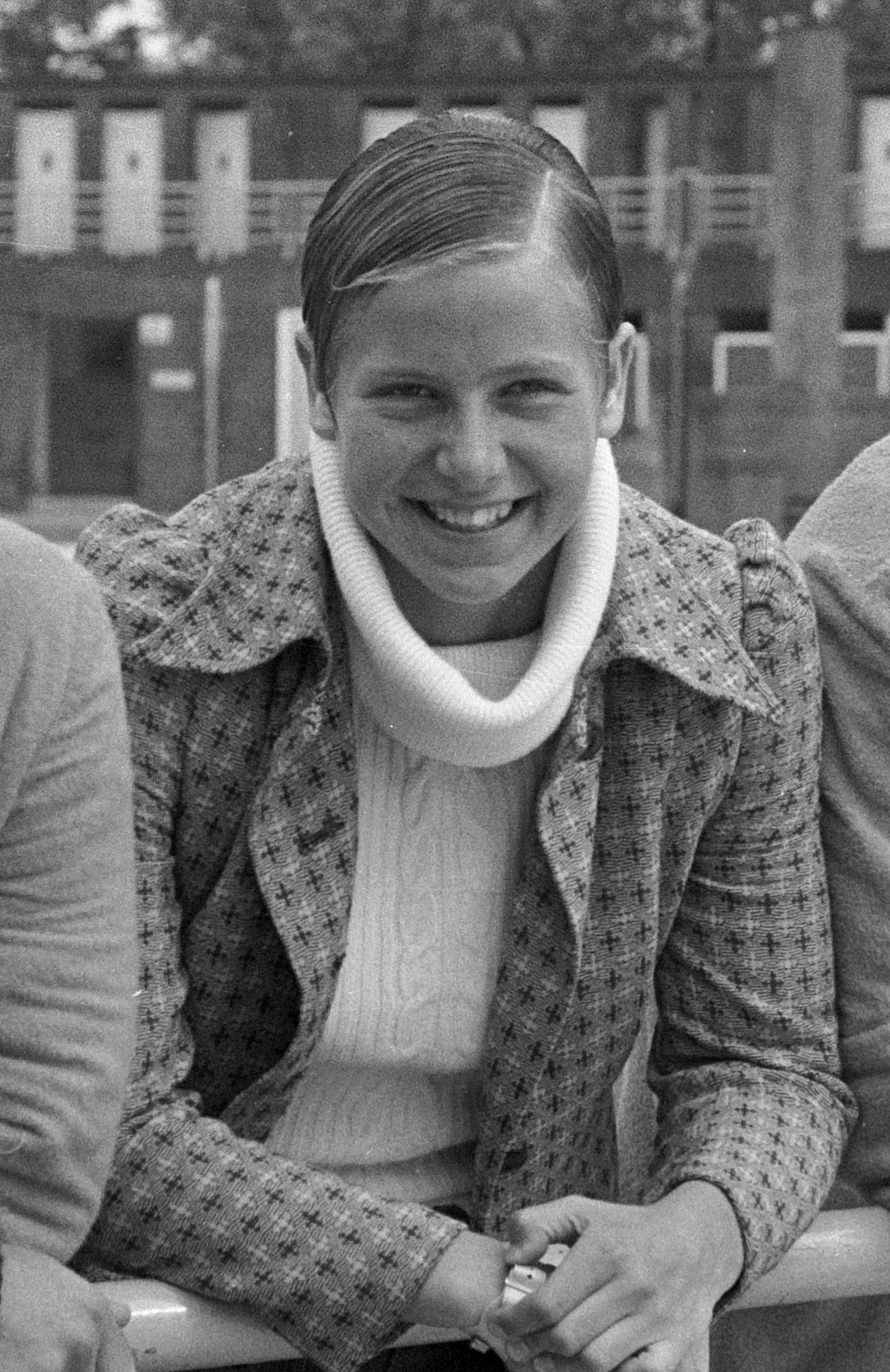
- Josien Elzerman in 1972

Personal information
- Born: 2 April 1956 (age 70) The Hague, the Netherlands

Sport
- Sport: Swimming
- Club: ZIAN, Den Haag

Josina ("Josien") Alida Elzerman (born 2 April 1956) is a former freestyle and backstroke swimmer from the Netherlands, who competed for her native country at the 1972 Summer Olympics. There she was eliminated in the qualifying heats of the 200 m breaststroke, clocking 2:28.18, and finished in fifth place in the 4×100 m freestyle relay. Both her brothers Hans and Henk were Olympic swimmers.
