= Franz Ludwig Wind =

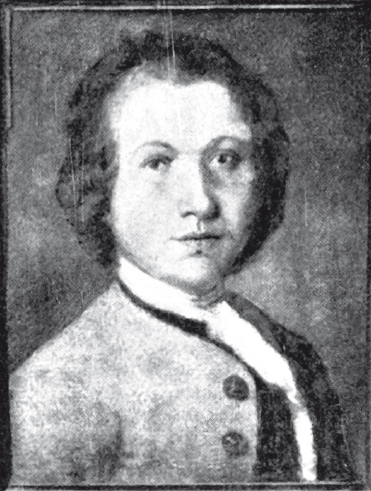
Franz Ludwig Kind

Franz Ludwig Wind (born November 14, 1719 – August 25, 1789) was a Swiss sculptor and wood carver.

== Life ==
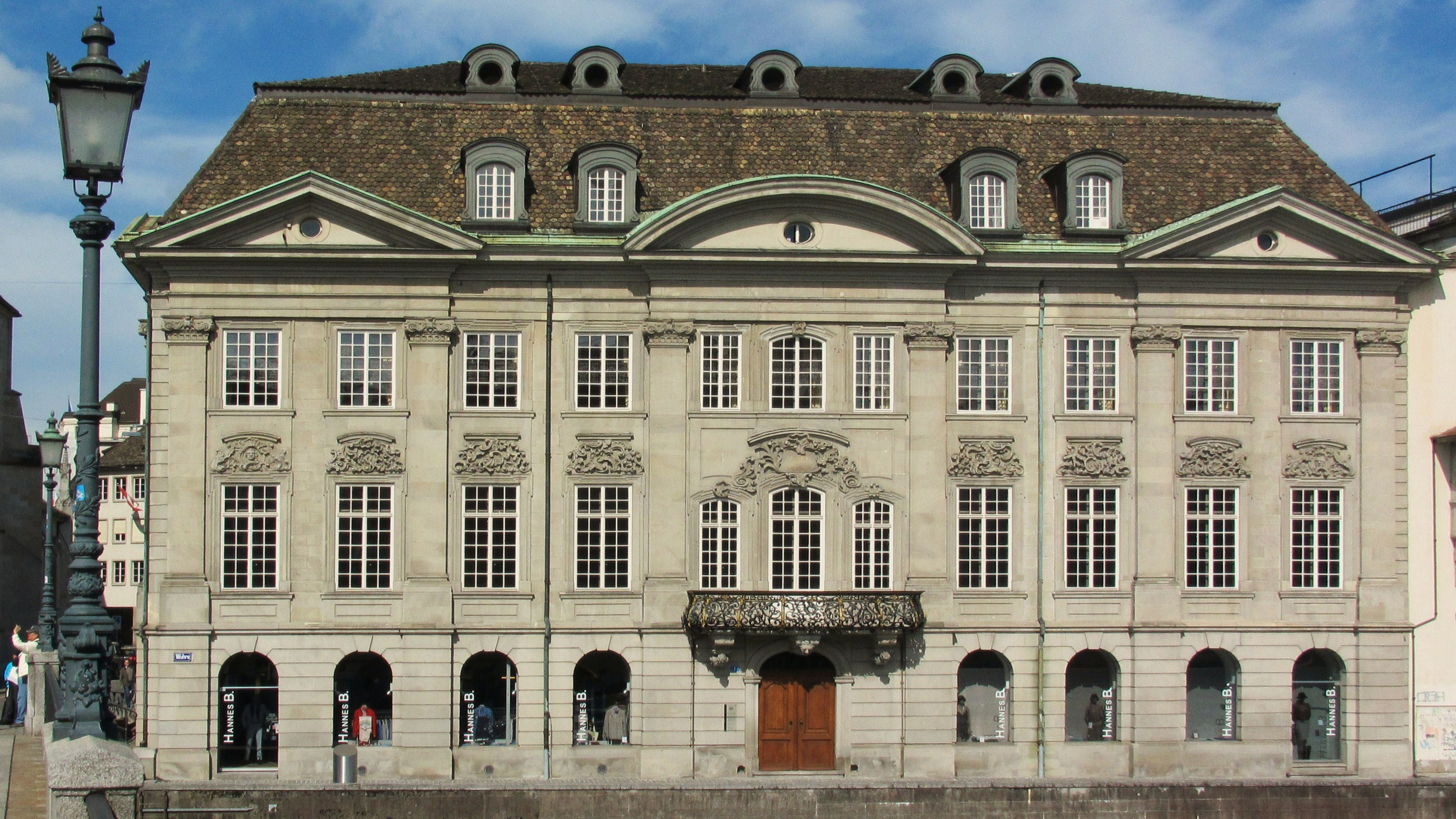
Zunfthaus zur Meisen in Zürich mit Dekorationen von Franz Ludwig Wind

Franz Ludwig Wind was born on November 14, 1719 in Kaiserstuhl, Switzerland. His father was Anton Wind from Reutte in Tyrol. Between 1735 and 1741 he probably completed as apprenticeship as a sculptor in Tyrol.

On August 21, 1749, he applied for the citizenship of his home village of Kaiserstuhl. In 1755, Wind made two urns for the garden wall and ten grimaces for the windows of the Meisen guild house in Zürich.

His main work was the decorative elements and grimaces of the Marschallhof in Kaiserstuhl from 1764, which were knocked off in the 19th century.

In 1773 he designed the façade of the provost's office in Zurzach. The portal of Schloss Schwarzwasserstelz from 1776 is also attributed to Wind.

== Works ==
- 1752: Nepomuk statue on the Rhine bridge in Kaiserstuhl
- 1756–1757: Pulpit and cheeks in the parish church of Kaiserstuhl
- 1755: Ten grimaces and two urns at the Meisen guild house in Zürich
- 1765: The staircase balustrade decorated in relief in the Haus zur Linde and the architectural sculpture of the Mayenfisch
- 1767-1768: facade decorations at the orphanage in Zürich
- 1772: relief of the coat of arms on the town hall and the customs house portal in Kaiserstuhl
- 1773: Facade of the Propsteig building in Zurzach
- 1773–1786: altar figures and side altars in the parish church of St. Micheal Würenlingen

== Sources ==
- Alois Wind: Bildhauer Franz Ludwig Wind von Kaiserstuhl. In: Argovia, Jahresschrift der Historischen Gesellschaft des Kantons Aargau, Jahrgang 33, 1909, pp. 75–85.Bildhauer Franz Ludwig Wind von Kaiserstuhl
- Peter Felder: Barockplastik der Schweiz. In: Beiträge zur Kunstgeschichte der Schweiz. Band 6, Gesellschaft für Schweizerische Kunstgeschichte (Hrsg.). Bern 1988, ISBN 3-909158-06-4, p. 311 ff.
