= Rolf Stadelmann =

Swiss rower

Personal information
- Nationality: Swiss
- Born: 29 April 1948 (age 78)

Sport
- Sport: Rowing

Rolf Stadelmann (born 29 April 1948) is a Swiss rower. He competed in the men's coxed four event at the 1972 Summer Olympics.
