= Yury Shamayev =

Soviet rower

Personal information
- Born: 15 April 1947 (age 77)

Sport
- Sport: Rowing

Yury Shamayev (Russian: Юрий Шамаев; born 15 April 1947) is a Soviet rower. He competed at the 1972 Summer Olympics in Munich with the men's coxed four where they came fourth.
