= Michael Conway (rowing) =

Canadian rowing coxswain

Personal information
- Nationality: Canadian
- Born: 3 March 1953 (age 73) Sydney, Australia

Sport
- Sport: Rowing

Michael Conway (born 3 March 1953) is a Canadian rowing coxswain. He competed in the men's coxed four event at the 1972 Summer Olympics.
