= Frieke Buys =

Dutch swimmer

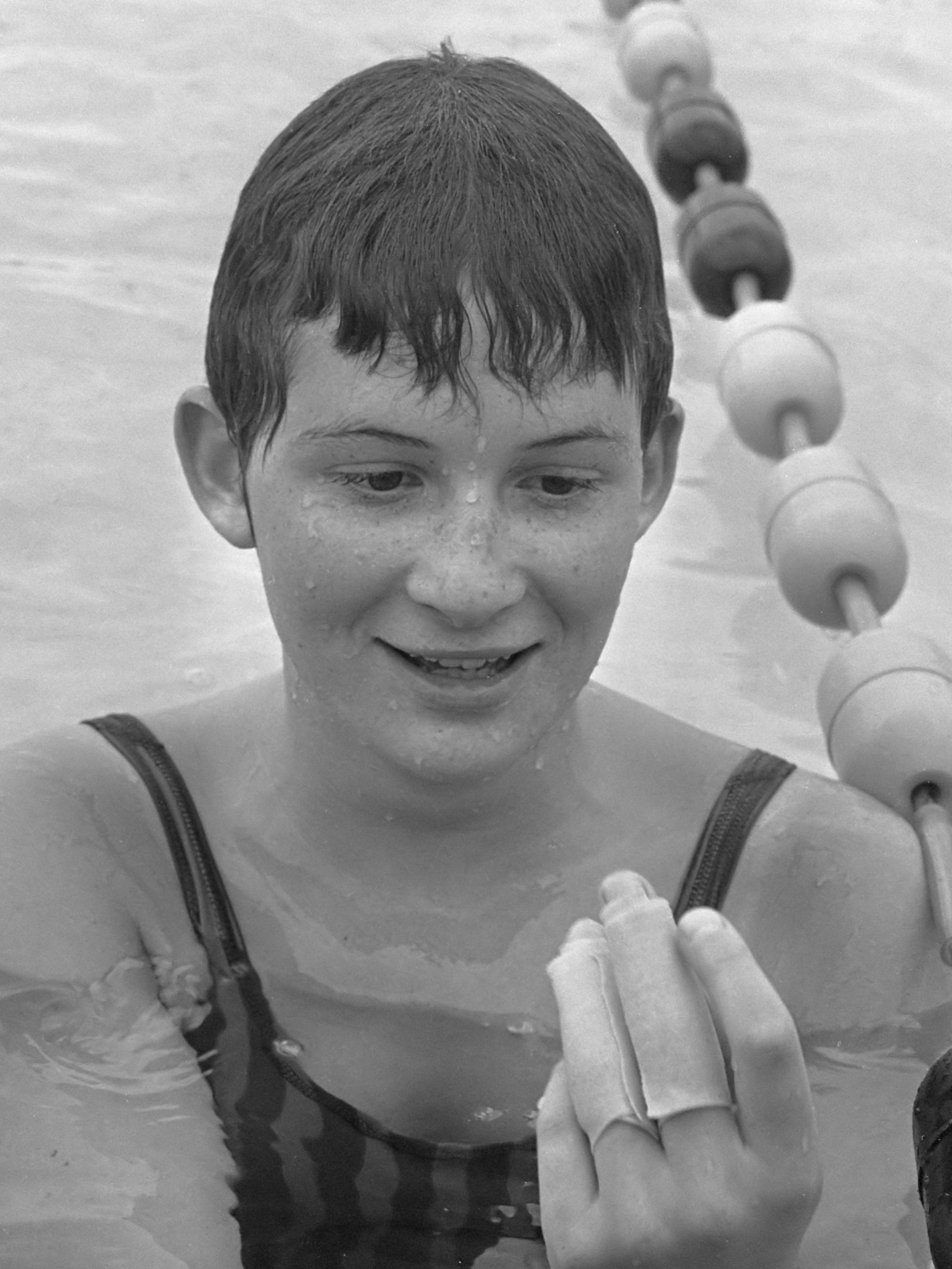
- Buys in 1970

Personal information
- Born: 7 June 1954 (age 72) Vlaardingen, the Netherlands

Sport
- Sport: Swimming
- Strokes: Butterfly
- Club: VZC, Vlaardingen

Johanna Friederike "Frieke" Buys (later Waterloo, born 7 June 1954) is a retired butterfly swimmer from the Netherlands, who represented her native country at the 1972 Summer Olympics. There she was eliminated in the semifinals of the 100 m butterfly, and in the heats of the 200 m butterfly. With the 4 × 100 m medley relay team she ended up in fifth place, clocking 4:29.99.

At the European championships, Buys placed fourth with the 4 × 100 m medley relay team in 1970.
