= Edgar Smith (rower) =

Canadian rower

Personal information
- Nationality: Canadian
- Born: 12 January 1950 (age 75); Comox, British Columbia, Canada

Sport
- Sport: Rowing

Edgar Smith (born 12 January 1950) is a Canadian rower. He competed at the 1972 Summer Olympics and the 1976 Summer Olympics.
