= Stewart MacDonald (rowing) =

American rower

Personal information
- Nationality: American
- Born: December 29, 1949 (age 76) Boston, Massachusetts, United States

Sport
- Sport: Rowing

Stewart MacDonald (born December 29, 1949) is an American rower. He competed at the 1968 Summer Olympics and the 1972 Summer Olympics.
