= Aleksandr Lyubaturov =

Soviet rower

Personal information
- Born: 4 April 1942 (age 82)

Sport
- Sport: Rowing

Aleksandr Lyubaturov (Russian: Александр Любатуров; born 4 April 1942) is a Soviet rower. He competed at the 1972 Summer Olympics in Munich with the men's coxed four where they came fourth.
