= Bjarne Pedersen (rower) =

Danish rower (born 1944)

Personal information
- Nationality: Danish
- Born: 18 January 1944 (age 82)

Sport
- Sport: Rowing

Bjarne Pedersen (born 18 January 1944) is a Danish rower. He competed in the men's coxed four event at the 1972 Summer Olympics. He is married to fellow rower Lotte Koefoed.
