= Hans Elzerman =

Dutch swimmer

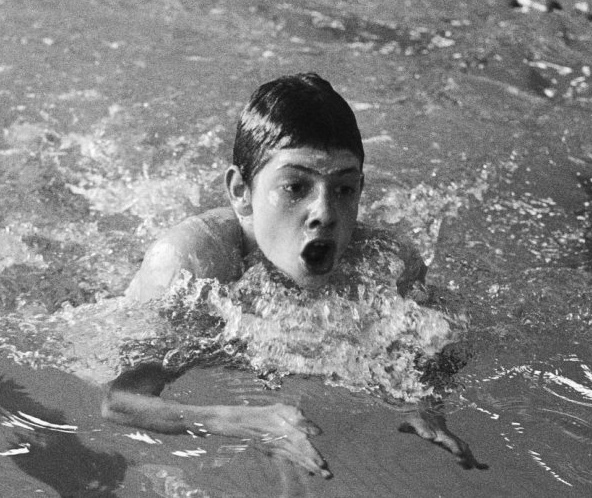
- Elzerman in 1971

Personal information
- Full name: Johan Reindert Elzerman
- Nationality: Dutch
- Born: 17 October 1954 (age 71) The Hague, Netherlands

Sport
- Sport: Swimming
- Strokes: freestyle

Hans Elzerman (born 17 October 1954) is an Olympic swimmer from the Netherlands, and as of early 2011 is a national swimming coach. His sister Josien and brother Henk are also Olympic swimmers.

At the 1972 Olympics, Hans was a member of the Dutch 4x100 and 4x200 freestyle relay teams.

== Coaching ==
In 2001, Hans was one of the coaches who founded the Dutch club Top Zwemmen Amsterdam. Around this time, he was coach to Inge de Bruijn. In 2007, Top Zwemmen became part of the National Swimming Institute of Amsterdam.
