= Harmen Wind =

Dutch poet and writer (1945–2010)

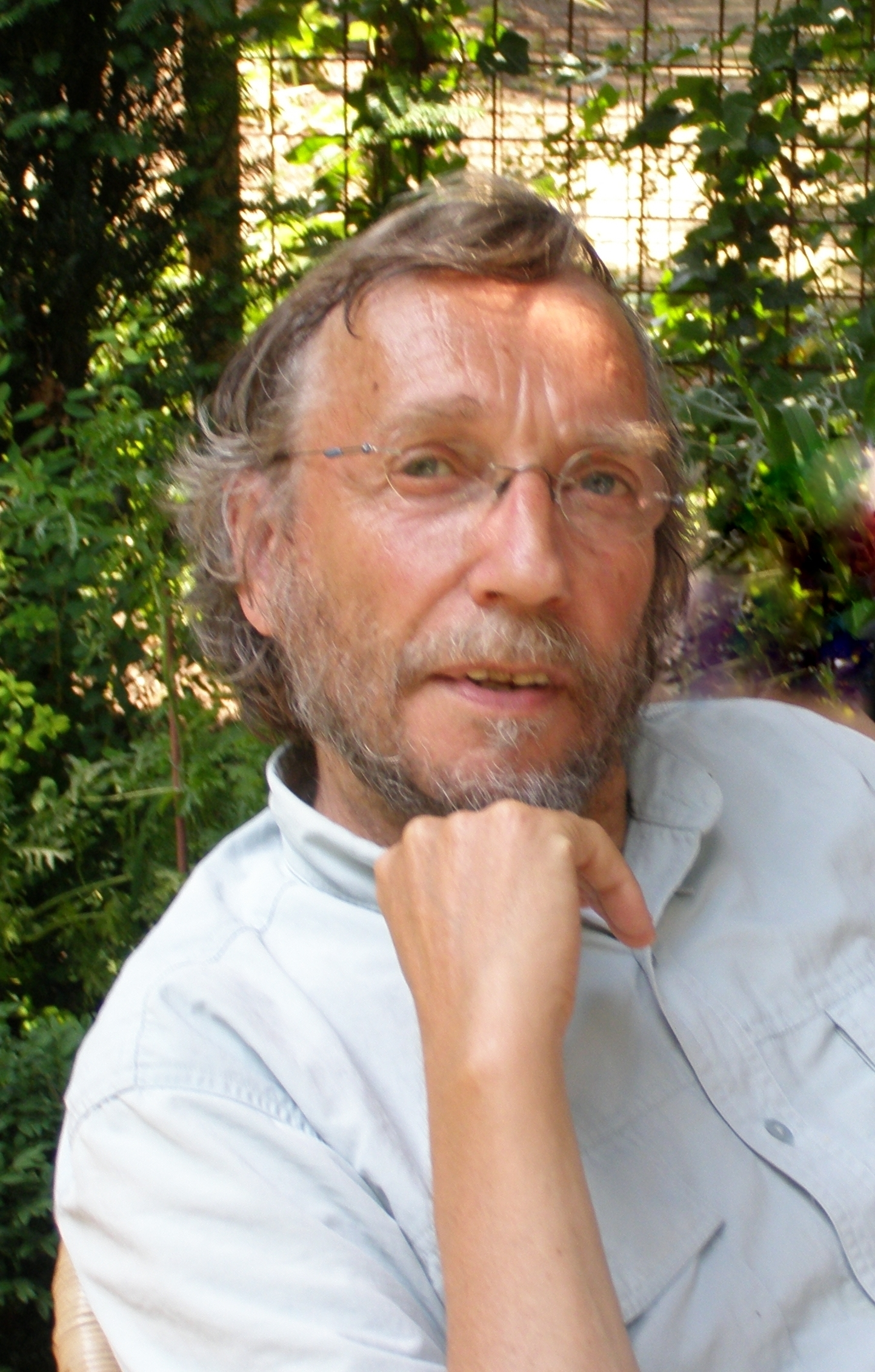
Wind (2008)

Harmen Wind (Leeuwarden, 24 December 1945 – Doesburg, 1 October 2010) was a Dutch poet and writer. Wind grew up in Oldeboorn and lived in Doesburg. As a writer he published both in Dutch and Frisian.

== Career ==
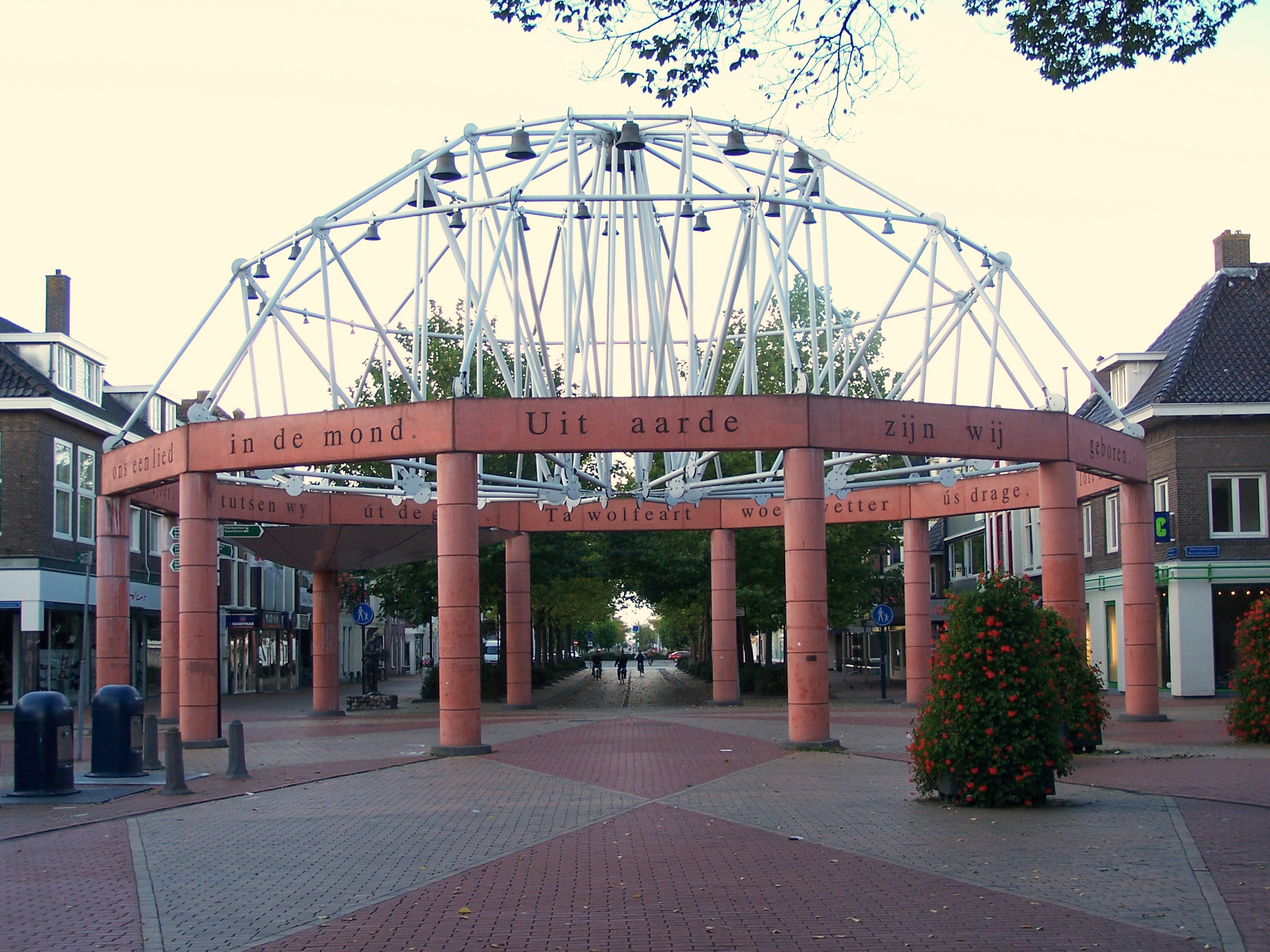
Carillon in Drachten with poem by Windː Uit aarde zijn wij ...

In 2002, Het verzet was published by De Arbeiderspers.

In 2013, Rekkenskip was published.

On 30 November 2015, Wind's poems, along with Albertina Soepboer, Arjen Hut, Bartle Lavermann, Sannemaj Betten, Wilco Berga, A. de Tollenaar, C. Budding, H.H. ter Balk and Loet Hin, were selected to represent the Frisian literature in Malta.

== Prizes ==
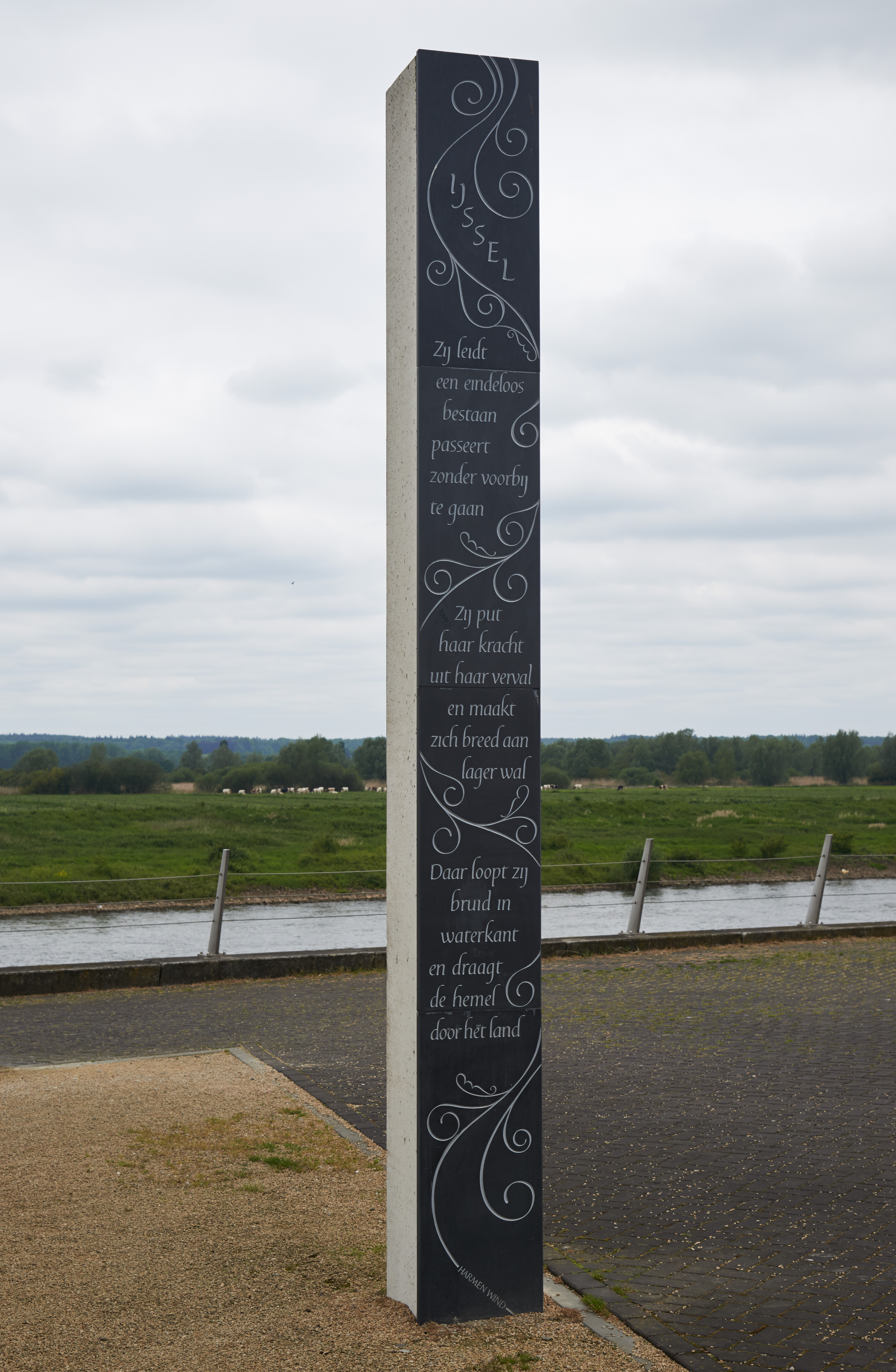
Artwork in Doesburg with poem about the IJssel by Harmen Wind

He won several prizes for his literary work:

- 1987: Fedde Schurerpriis for Ut ein
- 2003: Debutantenprijs for Het verzet
- 2006: Rink van der Veldepriis for It ferset
