= Per Wind (rower) =

Danish rower

Personal information
- Nationality: Danish
- Born: 16 October 1947 (age 79)

Sport
- Sport: Rowing

Per Wind (born 16 October 1947) is a Danish rower. He competed in the men's coxed four event at the 1972 Summer Olympics.
