= Petter Wærness =

Norwegian rower

Personal information
- Nationality: Norwegian
- Born: 23 April 1947 (age 79) Stavanger, Norway

Sport
- Sport: Rowing

Petter Wærness (born 23 April 1947) is a Norwegian rower. He competed in the men's coxed four event at the 1972 Summer Olympics.
