= Kim Wind =

Danish rower

Personal information
- Nationality: Danish
- Born: 17 June 1957 (age 69)

Sport
- Sport: Rowing

Kim Wind (born 17 June 1957) is a Danish rower. He competed in the men's coxed four event at the 1972 Summer Olympics.
