= Claudio Padoan =

Italian rower

Personal information
- Nationality: Italian
- Born: 18 March 1948 (age 78)

Sport
- Sport: Rowing

Claudio Padoan (born 18 March 1948) is an Italian rower. He competed in the men's coxed four event at the 1972 Summer Olympics.
