= Hansje Bunschoten =

Dutch swimmer (1958–2017)

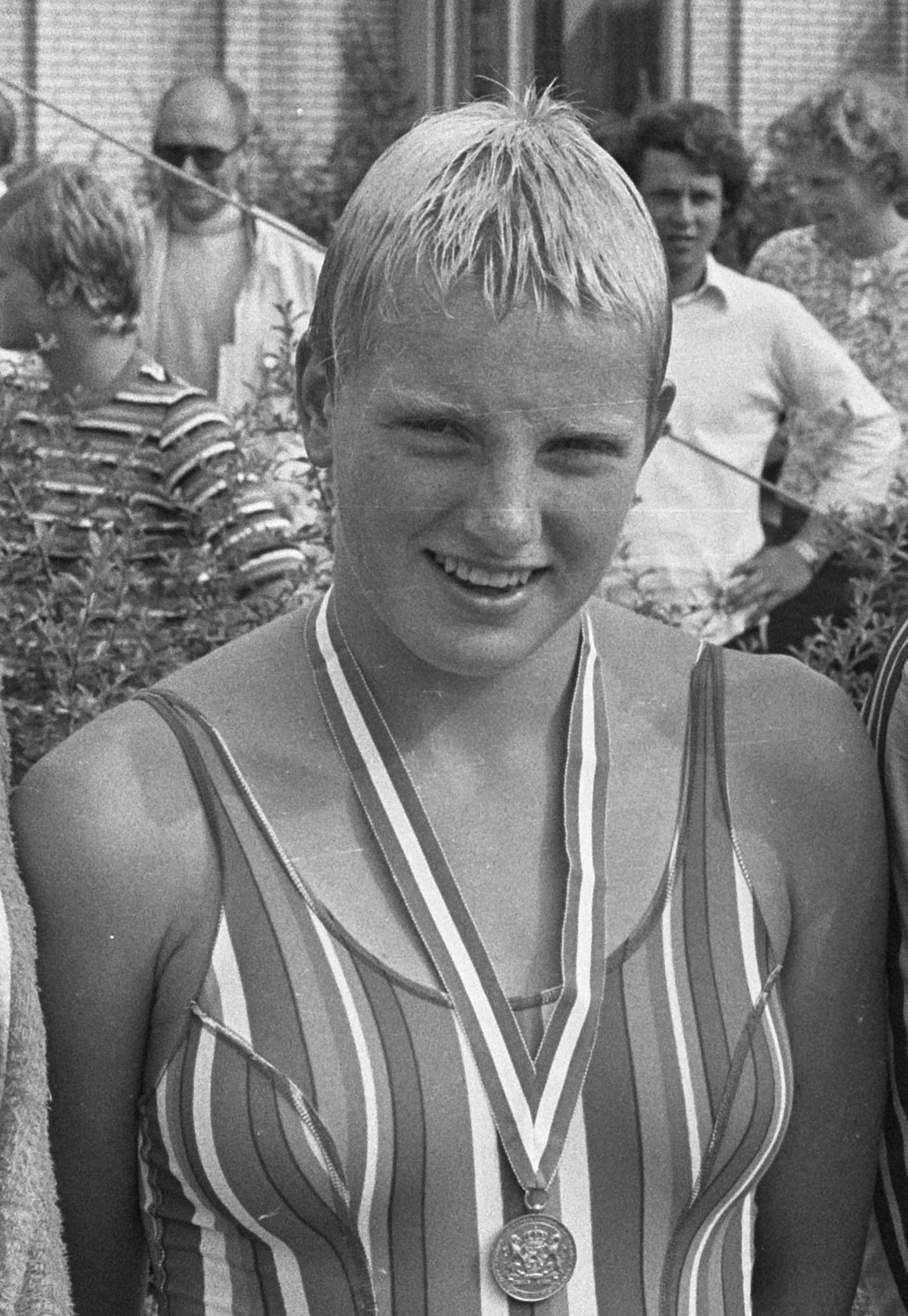
- Hansje Bunschoten in 1972

Personal information
- National team: Netherlands
- Born: 3 May 1958 Hilversum
- Died: 1 October 2017 (aged 59) Almere

Sport
- Sport: Swimming
- Strokes: Freestyle, medley

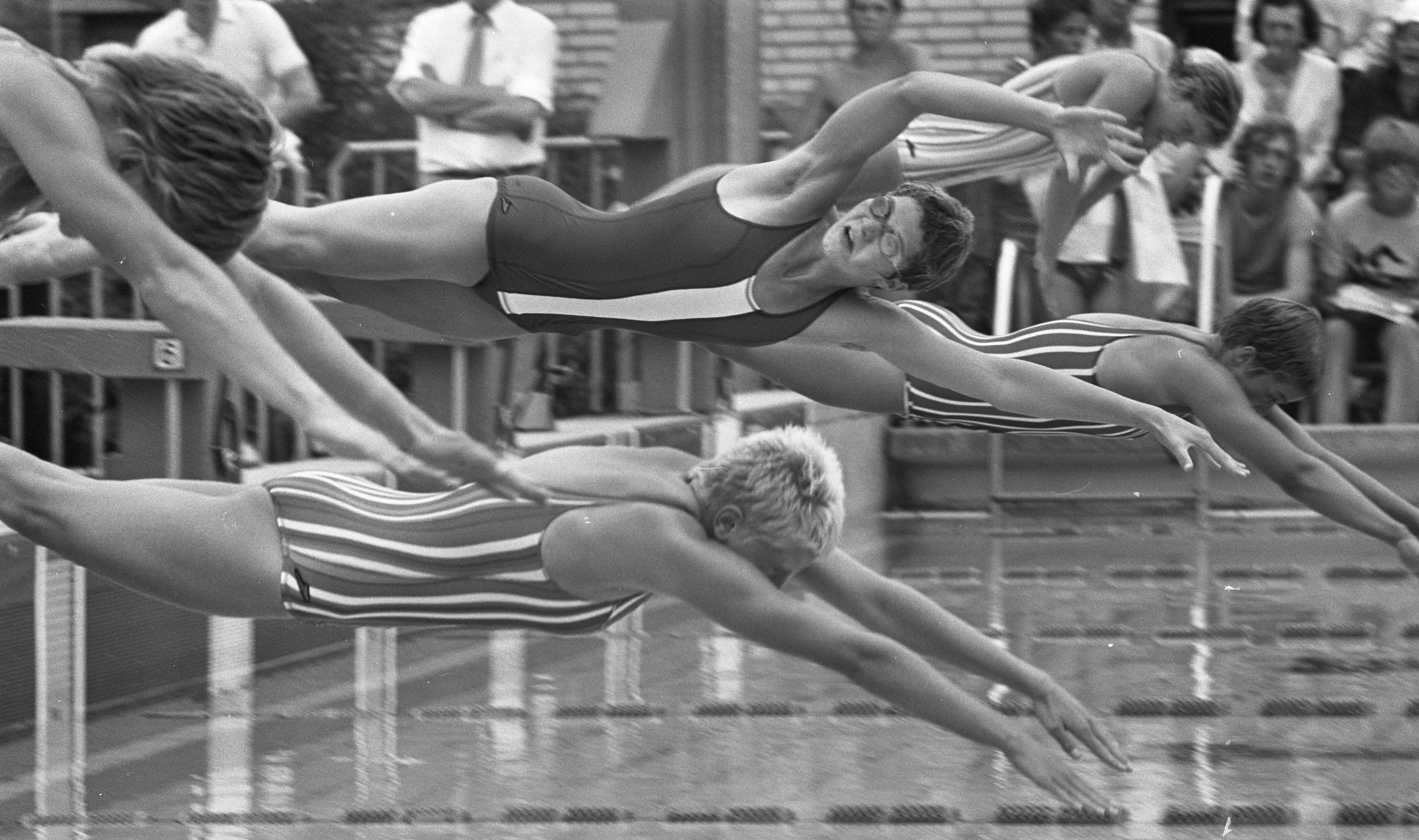
Hansje Bunschoten (under) at the start of the 800 m freestyle national championships in 1972

Hansje Bunschoten (3 May 1958 – 1 October 2017) was a freestyle swimmer from the Netherlands, who competed for her native country at the 1972 Summer Olympics in Munich, West Germany. As a member of the Dutch Relay Teams she finished in fifth place, both in the 4 × 100 m medley and the 4 × 100 m freestyle.

She was active in several roles, such as a radio and TV presenter and director for sports programs and swimming commentator (including at the 1992 and 1996 Olympics). In 2005, Bunschoten was diagnosed with breast cancer, which recurred in 2015. She died of this disease on October 1, 2017, at the age of 59.
