= Anke Rijnders =

Dutch swimmer (born 1956)

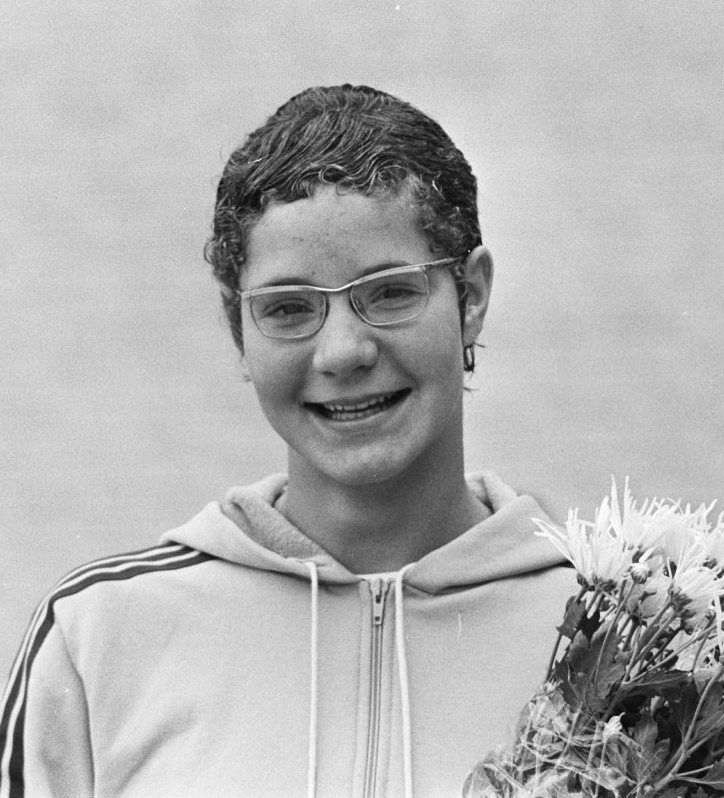
- Rijnders in 1971

Personal information
- Full name: Anthonia Marie Rijnders
- Born: 23 August 1956 (age 69) Amersfoort, Netherlands

Sport
- Sport: Swimming
- Club: AZ&PC, Amersfoort
Medal record
Representing the Netherlands
European Championships
Silver medal – second place	1974 Vienna	4×100 m freestyle

Anthonia Marie "Anke" Rijnders (born 23 August 1956) is a Dutch former butterfly and freestyle swimmer who competed for her native country at the 1972 Summer Olympics. As a member of the Dutch relay teams she finished in fifth place, both in the 4 × 100 m medley and the 4 × 100 m freestyle. On her personal starts, Rijnders finished in seventh (200 m freestyle) and eighth (400 m freestyle) place.

The same year she set three European records, in the 200 m and 400 m freestyle and 4 × 100 m medley relay.

She married the water polo player Wouter Gerritse and changed her last name to Gerritse. Their son, Willem Wouter Gerritse, is also a water polo player.
