= Will Baillieu =

Australian rower

Personal information
- Nationality: Australian
- Born: 15 August 1951 (age 73); Melbourne, Victoria, Australia

Sport
- Sport: Rowing

Will Baillieu (born 15 August 1951) is an Australian rower. He competed in the men's coxed four event at the 1972 Summer Olympics. He is a brother of former Premier of Victoria, Ted Baillieu.

Baillieu was a crew member of 1983 America's Cup winning Australia II. He was awarded the Medal of the Order of Australia in the 1984 Australia Day Honours.
