= Johan ter Haar =

Dutch rower

Personal information
- Nationality: Dutch
- Born: 21 May 1951 (age 75)

Sport
- Sport: Rowing

Johan ter Haar (born 21 May 1951) is a Dutch rower. He competed in the men's coxed four event at the 1972 Summer Olympics.
