= John Lee (rower) =

Australian rower

Personal information
- Nationality: Australian
- Born: 1 March 1948 (age 78)

Sport
- Sport: Rowing

John Lee (born 1 March 1948) is an Australian former representative rower. He competed in the men's coxed four event at the 1972 Summer Olympics.
