= Rooney Massara =

British rower and sailor (born 1943)

Personal information
- Full name: Rooney William John Massara
- Nationality: British
- Born: 22 January 1943 (age 83) Sutton, Surrey

Sport
- Club: Leander Club

Rooney William John Massara (born 22 January 1943 in Sutton, Surrey) is a retired British rower who competed at the 1972 Summer Olympics and a sailor.

== Rowing career ==
Massara was part of the winning crew, rowing for a Tideway Scullers and Leander composite, at the inaugural 1972 National Rowing Championships. Massara was then selected to represent Great Britain at the 1972 Olympics, replacing Dick Findlay in the men's coxed four event. The crew finished in tenth place after being knocked out in the semi-finals.

He was a member of winning crew in the Wyfold Challenge Cup (1967) and Grand Challenge Cup (1971) at the Henley Royal Regatta. He was in the winning Tideway Scullers crew in the Head of the River Race for eights, on three occasions. He was also runner up in the Wingfield Sculls, British Amateur Sculling Championships in 1968. Massara represented Great Britain from 1969 until 1972 and was captain of the Scullers from 1969 until 1972. He became a Selector for the British Rowing team from 1973 until 1976 (chairman in 1976).

== Sailing ==
Sailed in Flying Dutchman (dinghy) Olympic class dingy with Tim Lester at the helm from 1973 until 1976 and was shortlisted for sailing team for 1976 Summer Olympics but not selected.

== Personal life ==
Massara was educated at St Paul's School (London) and the University of London. He is married with three children & three grandchildren. He appeared in a short "cameo" role in the Beatles film "A Hard Day's Night (film)" – he was the sculler in the water in the scene where Ringo Starr was walking along the towpath at Kew – very short clip – "come in no. 7 your time is up". His business career started at British Motor Corporation in 1966 moving to British Leyland HQ Berkeley Square, London, in 1968 and then with British Leyland International. He was Export Manager Dunlop Sports Company (Dunlop Slazenger) 1977–1981. Marketing Manager Citroen Cars UK 1981–1984. Director JCB Sales (JC Bamford) 1984–1995. Joined JCB as marketing director and then ran their Middle East Africa operations and from 1992 to 1994 their Asia Pacific operation based in Singapore. Director & General Manager Stramit International 1994–1998.

In 1999, with his wife Pat, he bought Beech Farm Cottages, a Holiday Cottage complex. in Wrelton North Yorkshire. They won the Yorkshire Tourist Board's Holiday Cottage of the Year Award two years running before retiring in 2017.
