= Kees de Korver =

Dutch rower

Personal information
- Nationality: Dutch
- Born: 9 July 1951 (age 73)

Sport
- Sport: Rowing

Kees de Korver (born 9 July 1951) is a Dutch rower. He competed in the men's coxed four event at the 1972 Summer Olympics.
