= Rowing at the 1968 Summer Olympics – Men's coxless four =

Men's coxless four at the Games of the XIX Olympiad
- Date: 13–19 October 1968
- Competitors: 45 from 11 nations

Medalists
1st place, gold medalist(s)		Frank Forberger; Frank Rühle; Dieter Grahn; Dieter Schubert	East Germany
2nd place, silver medalist(s)		Zoltán Melis; József Csermely; György Sarlós; Antal Melis	Hungary
3rd place, bronze medalist(s)		Renato Bosatta; Pier Conti-Manzini; Tullio Baraglia; Abramo Albini	Italy

The men's coxless four competition at the 1968 Summer Olympics took place at Virgilio Uribe Rowing and Canoeing Course, Mexico.

== Competition format ==
This rowing competition consisted of two main rounds (heats and finals), as well as a repechage round that allowed teams that did not win their heats to advance to the final. All races were 2,000 metres in distance.

- Heats: Two heats. With 11 boats entered, there were five or six boats per heat. The top boat in each heat (total of 2 boats) advanced directly to the final; all other boats (9 boats) went to the repechage.
- Repechage: Two heats. There were four or five boats in each heat. The top two boats in each heat (total of 4 boats) advanced to the final. The remaining boats (5 boats) were sent to a 7th–11th place classification race.
- Finals: A main final and a 7th–12th place classification race.

== Results ==
=== Heats ===
==== Heat 1 ====
Rank	Rowers	Nation	Time	Notes
1	Frank Forberger; Frank Rühle; Dieter Grahn; Dieter Schubert	East Germany	6:54.62	Q
2	Pete Raymond; Raymond Wright; Charles Hamlin; Lawrence Terry	United States	6:57.68	R
3	Vitolds Barkāns; Elmārs Rubīns; Pavel Ilyinsky; Guntis Niedra	Soviet Union	7:08.82	R
4	Thomas Hitzbleck; Manfred Weinreich; Volkhart Buchter; Jochen Heck	West Germany	7:14.44	R
5	Roland Altenburger; Nicolas Gobet; Franz Rentsch; Alfred Meister	Switzerland	7:14.74	R
6	Pavel Cichi; Dumitru Ivanov; Emanoil Stratan; Anton Chirlacopschi	Romania	7:21.84	R

==== Heat 2 ====
Rank	Rowers	Nation	Time	Notes
1	Zoltán Melis; József Csermely; György Sarlós; Antal Melis	Hungary	6:44.72	Q
2	Renato Bosatta; Pier Conti-Manzini; Tullio Baraglia; Abramo Albini	Italy	6:53.11	R
3	Gunner Nielsen; John Erik Jensen; Johnny Algreen Petersen; Mogens Pedersen	Denmark	6:58.02	R
4	Patrick Sellier; Michel Beissière; Yannick Fave; Patrick van den Brouck	France	7:00.05	R
5	Roberto Retolaza; Arcadio Padilla; Jesús Toscano; David Trejo	Mexico	7:15.18	R

=== Repechage ===
==== Repechage heat 1 ====
Rank	Rowers	Nation	Time	Notes
1	Renato Bosatta; Pier Conti-Manzini; Tullio Baraglia; Abramo Albini	Italy	6:31.98	Q
2	Thomas Hitzbleck; Manfred Weinreich; Volkhart Buchter; Jochen Heck	West Germany	6:32.56	Q
3	Vitolds Barkāns; Elmārs Rubīns; Pavel Ilyinsky; Guntis Niedra	Soviet Union	6:33.35	C
4	Roberto Retolaza; Arcadio Padilla; Jesús Toscano; David Trejo	Mexico	7:02.92	C

==== Repechage heat 2 ====
Rank	Rowers	Nation	Time	Notes
1	Pete Raymond; Raymond Wright; Charles Hamlin; Lawrence Terry	United States	6:39.78	Q
2	Roland Altenburger; Nicolas Gobet; Franz Rentsch; Alfred Meister	Switzerland	6:40.75	Q
3	Patrick Sellier; Yvon Petit; Michel Beissière; Yannick Fave	France	6:44.06	C
4	Pavel Cichi; Dumitru Ivanov; Emanoil Stratan; Anton Chirlacopschi	Romania	6:44.71	C
5	Gunner Nielsen; John Erik Jensen; Johnny Algreen Petersen; Mogens Pedersen	Denmark	ST	C

=== Finals ===
==== Classification 7–11 ====
Rank	Rowers	Nation	Time
7	Pavel Cichi; Dumitru Ivanov; Emanoil Stratan; Anton Chirlacopschi	Romania	6:50.13
8	Roberto Retolaza; Arcadio Padilla; Jesús Toscano; David Trejo	Mexico	6:53.21
9	Patrick Sellier; Yvon Petit; Michel Beissière; Yannick Fave	France	6:53.71
10	Gunner Nielsen; John Erik Jensen; Johnny Algreen Petersen; Mogens Pedersen	Denmark	7:20.31
11	Vitolds Barkāns; Elmārs Rubīns; Pavel Ilyinsky; Guntis Niedra	Soviet Union	DNS

==== Final ====
Rank	Rowers	Nation	Time
1st place, gold medalist(s)	Frank Forberger; Frank Rühle; Dieter Grahn; Dieter Schubert	East Germany	6:39.18
2nd place, silver medalist(s)	Zoltán Melis; József Csermely; György Sarlós; Antal Melis	Hungary	6:41.64
3rd place, bronze medalist(s)	Renato Bosatta; Pier Conti-Manzini; Tullio Baraglia; Abramo Albini	Italy	6:44.01
4	Roland Altenburger; Nicolas Gobet; Franz Rentsch; Alfred Meister	Switzerland	6:45.78
5	Pete Raymond; Raymond Wright; Charles Hamlin; Lawrence Terry	United States	6:47.70
6	Thomas Hitzbleck; Manfred Weinreich; Volkhart Buchter; Jochen Heck	West Germany	7:08.22
