= Volkhart =

Volkhart is a German-based given name and surname. Notable people with the name include:

- Volkhart Buchter (born 1944), German rower, West German Olympian
- Kurt C. Volkhart (1890-1959), German engineer, race driver and first driver of rocket powered car
- Max Volkhart (1848-1924), German painter and etcher

== See also ==
- Volhard
