= Dumitru Ivanov =

Dumitru Ivanov may refer to:

- Dumitru Ivanov (rower), a Romanian rower
- Dumitru Ivanov (politician), a Moldovan politician
