= Negrești =

- Town
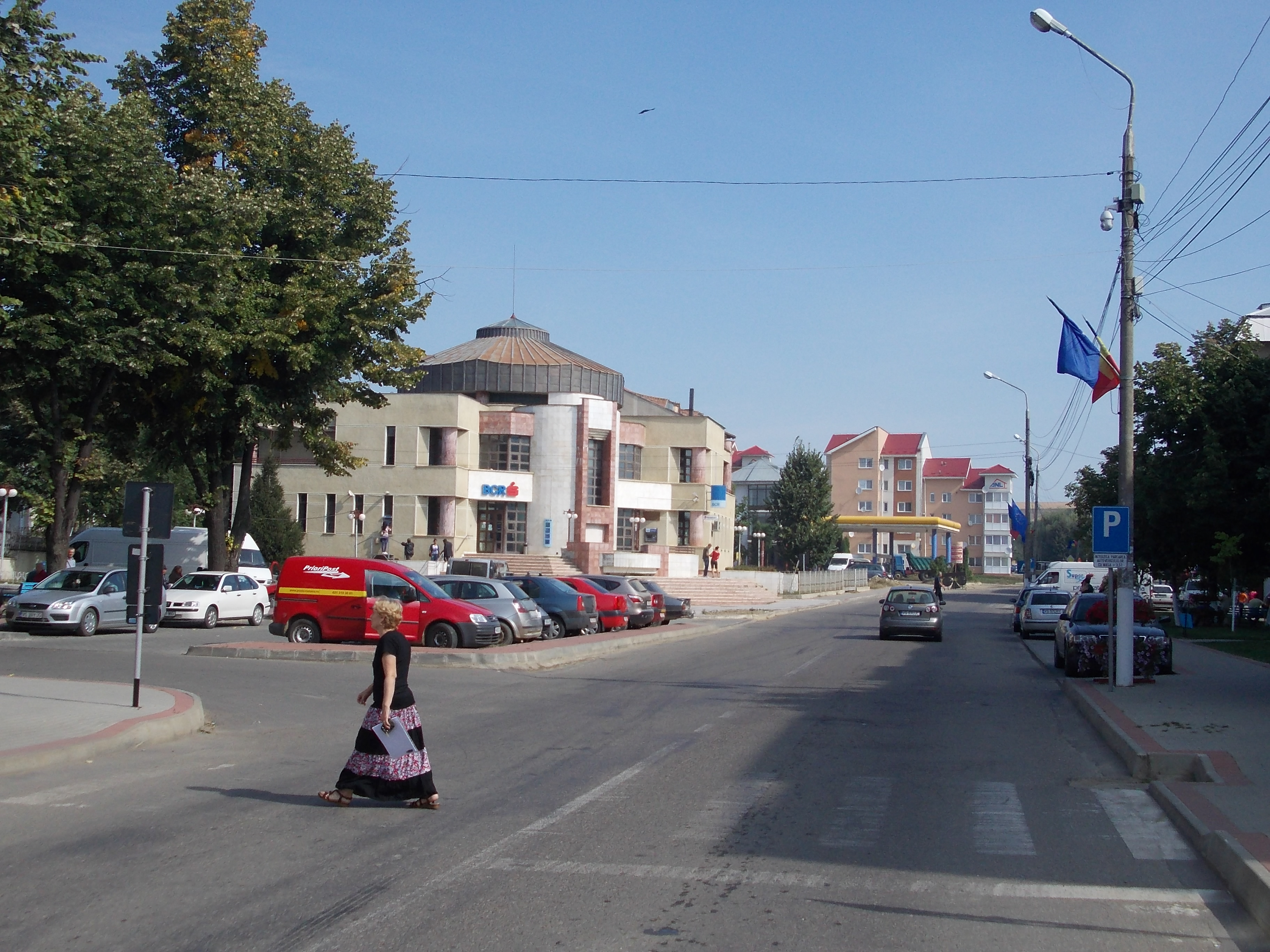
- Central Negrești

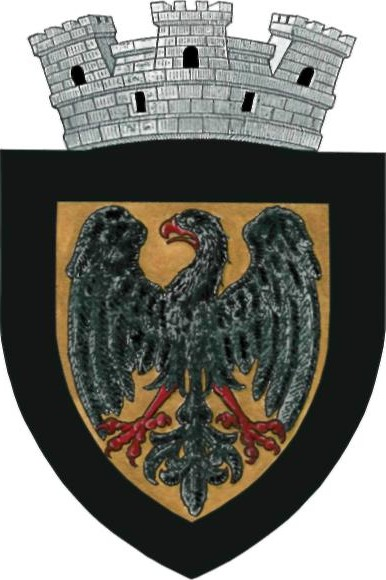
- Coat of arms

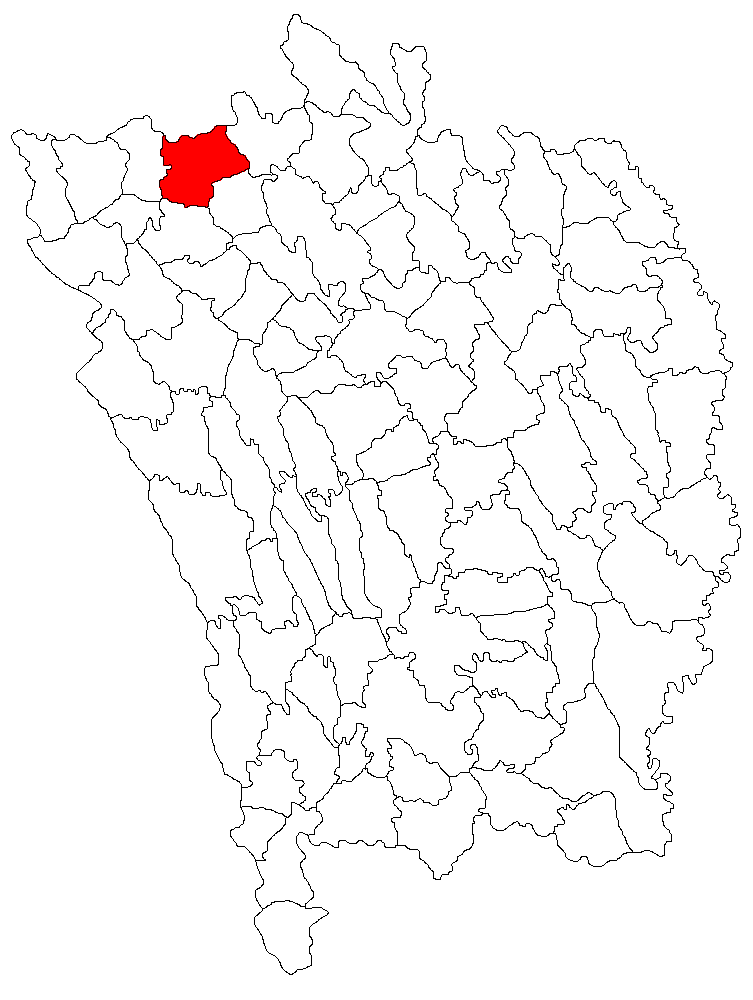
- Location in Vaslui County

- Location in Romania
- Coordinates: 46°50′25″N 27°26′30″E
- Country: Romania
- County: Vaslui

Government
  - Mayor (2024–2028): Petru Cristinel Rusu (PNL)
- Area: 61.1 km^{2} (23.6 sq mi)
- Elevation: 120 m (390 ft)
- Population (2021-12-01): 7,530
  - Density: 123/km^{2} (319/sq mi)
- Time zone: UTC+02:00 (EET)
  - Summer (DST): UTC+03:00 (EEST)
- Postal code: 735200
- Area code: (+40) 02 35
- Vehicle reg.: VS
- Website: negresti.ro

Negrești (Romanian pronunciation: [neˈɡreʃtʲ]) is a town in Vaslui County, located in the eastern part of Western Moldavia, a traditional region of Romania. At the 2021 census it had a population of 7,530. Its name comes from distinguished nobleman Negrea, who had worked in the council of Alexander the Good.

The town administers six villages: Căzănești, Cioatele, Glodeni, Parpanița, Poiana, and Valea Mare.

Negrești is situated at an altitude of 120 m (390 ft), on the banks of the Bârlad River and its left tributary, the river Stavnic. It is located in the northern part of Vaslui County, 33 km (21 mi) from the county seat, Vaslui, on the border with Iași County.

== Climate ==
Climate data for Negrești (elevation 133m, 2014–2026 normals, extremes 1964–present)
Month	Jan	Feb	Mar	Apr	May	Jun	Jul	Aug	Sep	Oct	Nov	Dec	Year
Record high °C (°F)	18.6 (65.5)	22.3 (72.1)	30.4 (86.7)	29.6 (85.3)	35.4 (95.7)	37.2 (99.0)	39.4 (102.9)	40.4 (104.7)	37.4 (99.3)	33.3 (91.9)	25.8 (78.4)	20.8 (69.4)	40.4 (104.7)
Mean daily maximum °C (°F)	3.1 (37.6)	5.8 (42.4)	11.5 (52.7)	16.9 (62.4)	21.9 (71.4)	27.3 (81.1)	29.6 (85.3)	30.3 (86.5)	24.6 (76.3)	17.0 (62.6)	9.5 (49.1)	4.8 (40.6)	16.9 (62.3)
Daily mean °C (°F)	−0.9 (30.4)	1.5 (34.7)	5.8 (42.4)	10.5 (50.9)	15.4 (59.7)	20.7 (69.3)	22.5 (72.5)	22.6 (72.7)	17.6 (63.7)	11.0 (51.8)	5.6 (42.1)	1.6 (34.9)	11.2 (52.1)
Mean daily minimum °C (°F)	−4.9 (23.2)	−2.7 (27.1)	0.1 (32.2)	4.1 (39.4)	8.8 (47.8)	14.0 (57.2)	15.4 (59.7)	14.8 (58.6)	10.6 (51.1)	5.0 (41.0)	1.8 (35.2)	−1.6 (29.1)	5.4 (41.8)
Record low °C (°F)	−30.5 (−22.9)	−29.7 (−21.5)	−22.6 (−8.7)	−8.7 (16.3)	−2.5 (27.5)	2.6 (36.7)	6.6 (43.9)	3.8 (38.8)	−7.4 (18.7)	−9.9 (14.2)	−25.4 (−13.7)	−25.0 (−13.0)	−30.5 (−22.9)
Average precipitation mm (inches)	21.4 (0.84)	21.4 (0.84)	31.8 (1.25)	39.2 (1.54)	60.4 (2.38)	80.1 (3.15)	46.9 (1.85)	40.1 (1.58)	39.6 (1.56)	51.9 (2.04)	39.0 (1.54)	26.6 (1.05)	498.4 (19.62)
Average precipitation days (≥ 1.0 mm)	4.7	5.0	5.1	6.5	7.5	8.2	5.8	3.8	4.6	5.8	5.8	5.8	68.6
Average snowy days	7.8	5.3	2.0	0.8	0	0	0	0	0	0.4	2.1	4.6	23
Source: Meteomanz, GeoReview

Historical population
Year	Pop.	±%
1977	6,978	—
1992	9,744	+39.6%
2002	10,481	+7.6%
2011	7,897	−24.7%
2021	7,530	−4.6%
Source: Census data

== Natives ==
- Maria Păduraru (born 1970), rower
- Emanoil Stratan (born 1940), rower
