= Zoltán Melis =

Hungarian rower (1947–2026)

Personal information
- Born: 11 September 1947 Pestszenterzsébet, Hungary
- Died: 5 August 2026 (aged 78)

Sport
- Sport: Rowing
Medal record
Men's rowing
Representing Hungary
Olympic Games
Silver medal – second place	1968 Mexico City	Coxless four
European Rowing Championships
Silver medal – second place	1969 Klagenfurt	Coxless four

Zoltán Melis (11 September 1947 – 5 August 2026) was a Hungarian rower who competed in the 1968 Summer Olympics and in the 1972 Summer Olympics. From Budapest, he entered rowing with his brother Antal after being inspired by watching the 1960 Summer Olympics. Melis joined the club Csepel SC in 1961 and competed for them for his entire career. Often rowing alongside his brother, he won a total of 33 national championships and was a member of the national team from 1965 to 1979. Melis won a silver medal at the 1968 Summer Olympics in the coxless four event. The following year, he won a silver medal in the same event at the 1969 European Rowing Championships. Melis retired from competitive rowing in 1980 and then became a coach, later serving as head coach for the national teams of Hungary and Egypt.

== Early life ==
Melis was born in Pestszenterzsébet, Budapest, Hungary, on 11 September 1947. He was the brother of Antal Melis, who later was his teammate at the Olympics. He and his brother grew up competing in sports, including wrestling. They competed for the club Kinizsi Húsos, but later decided to switch sports, after Melis once dropped his brother onto his head and witnessed a severe injury to another wrestler. Melis became a swimmer, being a member of the club Bp. Spartacus, but was not very successful in the sport.

Melis watched the 1960 Summer Olympics and became inspired after seeing Hungarian sprint canoeist János Parti win the gold medal in his event. Melis and his brother decided to enter kayaking, and one of their acquaintances said they could help as they knew a kayaking coach. The coach was involved in rowing instead, leading to them becoming rowers.

== Rowing career ==
Melis joined the club Csepel SC in 1961, remaining there for the rest of his career. Two years later, he won a national youth championship, at age 16. Melis was often teammates with his brother Antal, and in 1965, they became national champions. Representing Csepel SC, they won numerous national titles throughout the 1960s and 1970s, sometimes winning national titles in four events a year, and helped their club to first-place finishes at the championships. Melis won a total of 33 senior national titles before his retirement in 1980.

In 1965, Melis, a coxswain, was selected for the national team. In the mid-1960s, he and his brother were part of the Hungarian "B" team in the coxless four event. The "A" team of László Lucsánszky, József Csermely, György Sarlós, and Csaba Czakó, after placing fourth at the World Championships and medalling at the European Championships, was expected to be named the team for the 1968 Summer Olympics. Instead, that team was to compete with the "B" team at the 1968 Lucerne regatta to determine the Olympic squad. The "B" team including Melis and his brother finished third, while the "A" team was not able to reach the finals. Afterwards, national officials combined the two teams to make the coxless four squad for the Olympics: Melis and his brother joined Sarlós and Csermely. Melis, aged 21, was the youngest of them. He later said that, "This team proved to be lucky because me and [Antal] are more technical rowers, while Sarlós and Csermely are clearly power rowers. The weight distribution was also favorable, because they are five or six kilos heavier than us in the middle."

The 1968 Olympics was the first competition together for the new coxless four lineup. In their heat, they finished first by a large margin against Italy, Denmark, France, and Mexico, and overall had the best time in the heats. Melis recalled that they were considered one of the favorites in the finals, along with the East German team. Melis recalled that the Hungarian and East German teams were deadlocked in the finals for a long stretch before his team began to suffer from exhaustion, allowing the Germans to take the lead. Hungary's team finished second place with a time of 6:41.64, two seconds behind the Germans at 6:39.18. Melis said that 1,750 metres before the finish, "I neither saw nor heard, I just pulled, pulled, pulled," stating, "I came to my senses again in the medical room. The organizers were stomping around me nervously, because the results announcement was about to begin. As soon as I came to my senses, they stood me up and helped me onto the podium. There I met the others, who were in a similar state. We just stood there on the podium, dazed, tired, hardly realizing that we had become Olympic silver medalists." As of 2026, this remains the all-time best finish in the event for Hungary at the Olympics.

In 1969, Melis was part of a coxless four team that won silver at the European Rowing Championships. Three years later, he returned to the Olympics, earning selection to the Hungarian team in the men's eight event, and finishing in seventh place. He continued to compete with the national team through 1979, and retired from competitive rowing in 1980.

== Coaching career ==
During the later years of his rowing career, Melis studied to earn a professional coaching diploma, earning it in 1979. After retiring from rowing, he joined his club, Csepel SC, as a coach.

After three years at Csepel SC, Melis was named head coach of the national team in 1983, while staying coach of his club for the time, although this role was later taken on by his brother. He trained the Hungarian teams that competed at the 1988 and the 1992 Summer Olympics, and during his stint as coach of the national team, Katalin Sarlós won a bronze medal at the World Championships. However, after what was viewed as a poor performance by the team at the 1992 Olympics, with none of the Hungarian rowers reaching the finals and none placing better than 10th overall, Melis's contract was not renewed after the season.

Two years later, Melis became the head coach of the national team in Egypt, a country with much less experience in rowing. He said of Egypt's rowing scene: "We can't really talk about a competition system in the European sense here. Typically, companies and larger institutions have clubs in Egypt where they practice the sport at a hobby level. There are about thirty such clubs in the country, but half of them do not have any competitive sports at all." In Egypt, Melis helped develop Ali Ibrahim, who became an African champion and the country's only rower at the 1996 Summer Olympics, finishing eighth. This was the country's second-best finish at the 1996 Olympics in any sport.

Melis returned to Hungary and was named the head coach of the national team again in 1997. He served 11 more years there, coaching Tibor Pető and Ákos Haller to bronze medals at the World Championships in 2001 and 2002, Péter Lőrinczy and Kornél Szabó to junior world championships in 2003 and 2004, and Zsolt Hirling and Tamás Varga to gold at the World Championships in 2005. Melis stepped down from coaching the national team at the end of 2008, and was succeeded by László Ficsor. He afterwards returned to coaching at Csepel SC. He worked as coach of the U16 team until retiring in 2016.

== Personal life and death ==
Melis married Évával Molnár, also a rower, and had two children with her; she predeceased him in 2014. He was the brother-in-law of Olympians Kamilla Kosztolányi and József Csermely. He died on 5 August 2026, at the age of 78. Following his death, the Hungarian Rowing Association said, "Zoltán Melis was not only an exceptional competitor, but also a professional and role model who dedicated his entire life to Hungarian rowing. His achievements, knowledge and humanity left a lasting mark on the history of our sport."
