= Charles Hamlin =

Charles Hamlin may refer to:

- Charles Sumner Hamlin (1861–1938), American lawyer and first Chairman of the Federal Reserve
- Charles Hamlin (general) (1837–1911), Union Army major during the American Civil War
- Charles Hamlin (rower) (born 1947), American Olympic rower
