= Boca (river) =

- Location within Romania

Location
- Country: Romania
- Counties: Iași County
- Villages: Hăbășești, Miclăușeni

Physical characteristics
- Mouth: Siret
  - location: near Miclăușeni
  - coordinates: 47.0820°N 26.9116°E
- Length: 11 km (6.8 mi)
- Basin size: 47 km^{2} (18 sq mi)

Basin features
- Progression: Siret→ Danube→ Black Sea
- Tributaries
  - left: Daicița
- River code: XII.1.36

The Boca is a left tributary of the river Siret in Romania. It flows into the Siret near Miclăușeni. The Boca is 11 km (6.8 mi) long and its basin size is 47 km^{2} (18 sq mi).
