= Mogens Pedersen =

Mogens Pedersen can refer to:

- Mogens E. Pedersen (1924–2014), a Danish journalist
- Mogens Pedersen (rower, born 1937), a Danish Olympic rower
- Mogens Pedersen (rower, born 1944), a Danish Olympic rower

== See also ==
- Mogens Pedersøn (1583–1623), a Danish composer
