= Raymond Wright (rower) =

American rower

Personal information
- Nationality: American
- Born: May 20, 1947 (age 79) Seattle, Washington, United States

Sport
- Sport: Rowing

Raymond Wright (born May 20, 1947) is an American rower. He competed in the men's coxless four event at the 1968 Summer Olympics.
