= Yvon Petit =

French rower

Personal information
- Nationality: French
- Born: 14 October 1945 Nantes, France
- Died: 14 February 2014 (aged 68)

Sport
- Sport: Rowing

Yvon Petit (14 October 1945 – 14 February 2014) was a French rower. He competed in the men's coxless four event at the 1968 Summer Olympics.
