= John Erik Jensen =

Danish rower

Personal information
- Nationality: Danish
- Born: 17 May 1945 (age 79); Guldborgsund, Denmark

Sport
- Sport: Rowing

John Erik Jensen (born 17 May 1945) is a Danish rower. He competed in the men's coxless four event at the 1968 Summer Olympics.
