= Abramo Albini =

Italian rower (born 1948)

Personal information
- Born: 29 January 1948 (age 78) Garzeno, Italy
Medal record
Men's rowing
Representing Italy
Olympic Games
Bronze medal – third place	1968 Mexico City	Coxless four

Abramo Albini (born 29 January 1948) is an Italian rower who competed in the 1968 Summer Olympics and in the 1972 Summer Olympics.

== Personal life ==
He was born in Garzeno in Northern West Italy.

== Career ==
In 1968, he was a crew member of the Italian boat which won the bronze medal in the coxless fours event. Four years later he finished tenth with the Italian boat in the 1972 coxless fours competition.
