= Alfred Meister =

Swiss rower

Personal information
- Nationality: Swiss
- Born: 26 September 1942 (age 82); Schaffhausen, Switzerland

Sport
- Sport: Rowing

Alfred Meister (born 26 September 1942) is a Swiss rower. He competed in the men's coxless four event at the 1968 Summer Olympics.
