= David Trejo =

Mexican rower (born 1945)

Personal information
- Born: 29 December 1945 (age 79); Mexico City, Mexico

Sport
- Sport: Rowing

David Trejo (born 29 December 1945) is a Mexican rower. He competed in the men's coxless four event at the 1968 Summer Olympics.
