= Pavel Cichi =

Romanian rower

Personal information
- Nationality: Romanian
- Born: 8 August 1943 (age 81); Miclăușeni, Iași County, Kingdom of Romania

Sport
- Sport: Rowing

Pavel Cichi (born 8 August 1943) is a Romanian rower. He competed in the men's coxless four event at the 1968 Summer Olympics.
