= Jochen Heck =

German rower

Personal information
- Born: 27 July 1947 (age 77); Bremen, Germany
- Height: 185 cm (6 ft 1 in)
- Weight: 85 kg (187 lb)

Sport
- Sport: Rowing

Jochen Heck (born 27 July 1947) is a German rower who represented West Germany. He competed at the 1968 Summer Olympics in Mexico City with the men's coxless four where they came sixth.
