= Butea, Iași =

Butea
- Commune
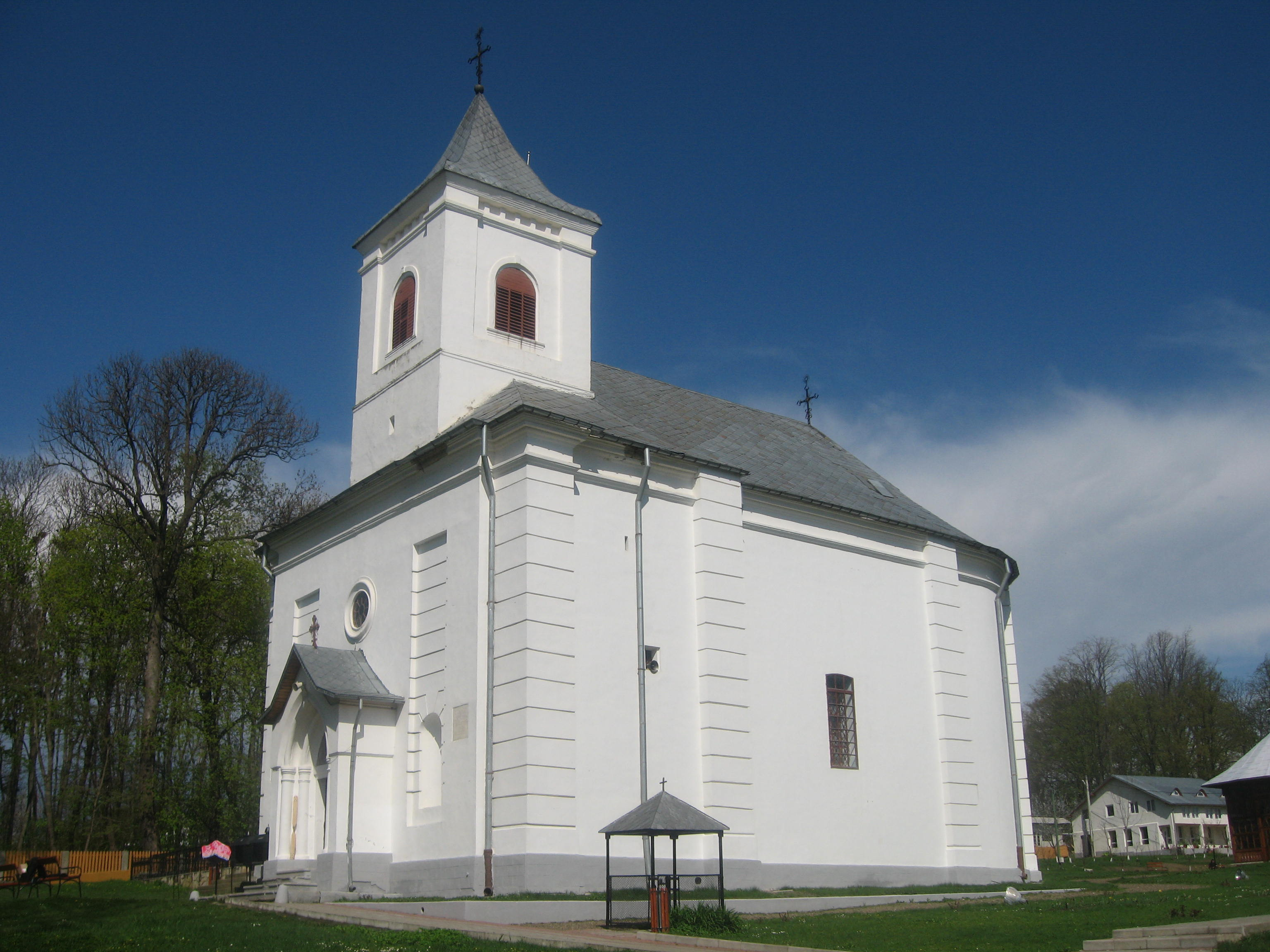
- Miclăușeni Monastery church

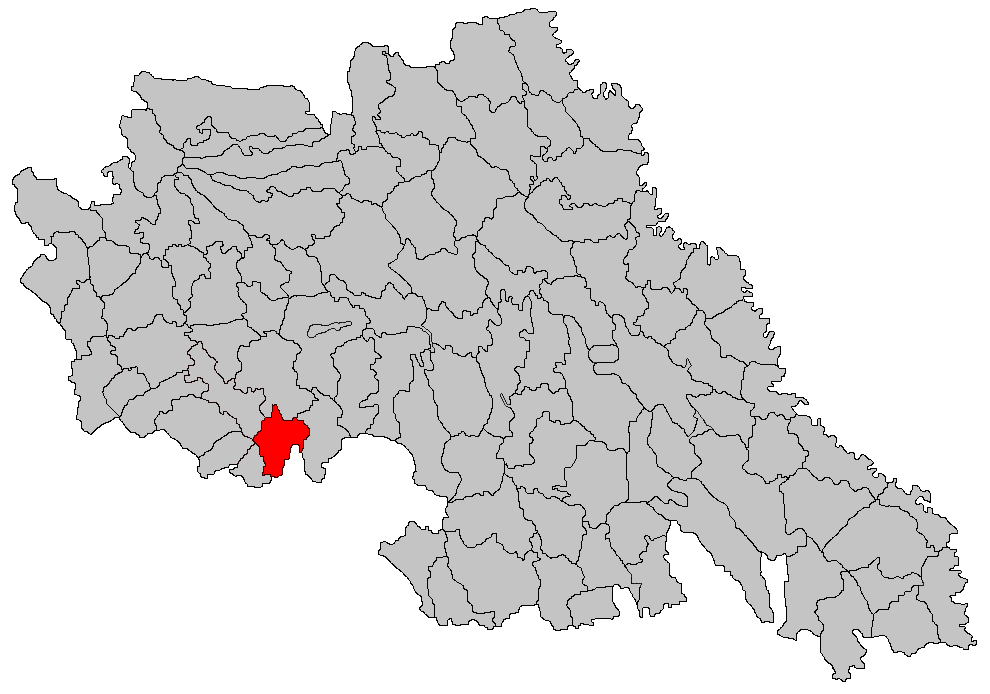
- Location in Iași County

- Location in Romania
- Coordinates: 47°4′N 26°55′E
- Country: Romania
- County: Iași

Government
  - Mayor (2020–2024): Anton Anti (PSD)
- Area: 37.29 km^{2} (14.40 sq mi)
- Elevation: 268 m (879 ft)
- Population (2021-12-01): 2,679
  - Density: 71.84/km^{2} (186.1/sq mi)
- Time zone: UTC+02:00 (EET)
  - Summer (DST): UTC+03:00 (EEST)
- Postal code: 707065
- Area code: +(40) 232
- Vehicle reg.: IS
- Website: primariabutea.ro

Butea is a commune in Iași County, Western Moldavia, Romania. It is composed of two villages, Butea and Miclăușeni.

The Sturdza Palace, associated with the Sturdza family, is located in Miclăușeni village.

== Natives ==
- Ludovic Antal (1924–1970), actor and cultural promoter
- Pavel Cichi (born 1943), rower
