= Yannick Fave =

French rower

Personal information
- Nationality: French
- Born: 3 August 1947 (age 77); Neuilly-sur-Seine, France

Sport
- Sport: Rowing

Yannick Fave (born 3 August 1947) is a French rower. He competed in the men's coxless four event at the 1968 Summer Olympics.
