= Tullio Baraglia =

Italian rower (1934–2017)

Personal information
- Born: 21 July 1934 Gera Lario, Italy
- Died: 23 November 2017 (aged 83)
- Height: 188 cm (6 ft 2 in)
- Weight: 87 kg (192 lb)

Sport
- Sport: Rowing
Medal record
Men's rowing
Representing Italy
Olympic Games
Silver medal – second place	1960 Rome	Coxless four
Bronze medal – third place	1968 Mexico City	Coxless four
European Rowing Championships
Gold medal – first place	1961 Prague	Coxless four

Tullio Baraglia (21 July 1934 – 23 November 2017) was an Italian rower who competed in the 1960 Summer Olympics and in the 1968 Summer Olympics.

He was born in Gera Lario.

In 1960 he was a crew member of the Italian boat which won the silver medal in the coxless four event at the 1960 Summer Olympics. At the 1961 European Rowing Championships, he won gold with the coxless four in Prague. Eight years after his first Olympic appearance, he won the bronze medal with the Italian boat in the coxless four competition at the 1968 Summer Olympics.
