= Patrick van den Brouck =

French rower

Personal information
- Nationality: French
- Born: 12 May 1948 (age 76); Elboeue, France

Sport
- Sport: Rowing

Patrick van den Brouck (born 12 May 1948) is a French rower. He competed in the men's coxless four event at the 1968 Summer Olympics.
