= Jesús Toscano =

Mexican rower (born 1943)

Personal information
- Born: 23 September 1943 (age 81); Guadalajara, Mexico

Sport
- Sport: Rowing

Jesús Toscano (born 23 September 1943) is a Mexican rower. He competed in the men's coxless four event at the 1968 Summer Olympics.
