= Anton Chirlacopschi =

Romanian rower

Personal information
- Nationality: Romanian
- Born: 24 May 1942 (age 82); Brăila, Romania

Sport
- Sport: Rowing

Anton Chirlacopschi (born 24 May 1942) is a Romanian rower. He competed in the men's coxless four event at the 1968 Summer Olympics.
