= Johnny Algreen Petersen =

Danish rower (born 1948)

Personal information
- Nationality: Danish
- Born: 28 September 1948 (age 77) Copenhagen, Denmark

Sport
- Sport: Rowing

Johnny Algreen Petersen (born 28 September 1948) is a Danish rower. He competed in the men's coxless four event at the 1968 Summer Olympics.
