= Antal Melis =

Hungarian rower

Personal information
- Born: 12 May 1946 (age 80) Budapest

Sport
- Sport: Rowing
Medal record
Men's rowing
Representing Hungary
Silver medal – second place	1968 Mexico City	Coxless four
European Rowing Championships
Silver medal – second place	1969 Klagenfurt	Coxless four

Antal Melis (born 12 May 1946) is a Hungarian rower who competed in the 1968 Summer Olympics and in the 1972 Summer Olympics.

He was born in Budapest.

In 1968 he was a crew member of the Hungarian boat which won the silver medal in the coxless four event.

Four years later he was eliminated with the Hungarian boat in the repêchage of the coxless four competition.

Melis married Kamilla Kosztolányi. His brother was Zoltán Melis.
