= Manfred Weinreich =

German rower (born 1946)

Personal information
- Born: 28 September 1946 (age 79) Brookmerland, Germany
- Height: 195 cm (6 ft 5 in)
- Weight: 90 kg (198 lb)

Sport
- Sport: Rowing
Medal record
Men's rowing
Representing West Germany
European Rowing Championships
Bronze medal – third place	1969 Klagenfurt	Eight

Manfred Weinreich (born 28 September 1946) is a German rower who represented West Germany.

He competed at the 1968 Summer Olympics in Mexico City with the men's coxless four where they came sixth. At the 1969 European Rowing Championships in Klagenfurt, he won bronze with the men's eight.
