= Roland Altenburger =

Swiss rower

Personal information
- Nationality: Swiss
- Born: 22 September 1948 (age 76); Schaffhausen, Switzerland

Sport
- Sport: Rowing

Roland Altenburger (born 22 September 1948) is a Swiss rower. He competed in the men's coxless four event at the 1968 Summer Olympics.
