= Guntis Niedra =

Latvian rower

Personal information
- Born: 8 February 1943 Riga, Reichskommissariat Ostland
- Died: 21 December 2005 (aged 62)
- Height: 189 cm (6 ft 2 in)
- Weight: 77 kg (170 lb)

Sport
- Country: Latvia
- Sport: Rowing
Medal record
Men's rowing
Representing the Soviet Union
European Rowing Championships
Silver medal – second place	1965 Duisburg	Eight

Guntis Niedra (8 February 1943 – 21 December 2005) was a Soviet rower from Latvia. Niedra was born in Riga, (then German-occupied) Latvia. At the 1965 European Rowing Championships in Duisburg, he won silver with the men's eight. He competed at the 1968 Summer Olympics in Mexico City with the men's coxless four where they came eleventh.
