= Pier Angelo Conti Manzini =

Italian rower

Medal record

Men's rowing

Representing Italy

Olympic Games
Bronze medal – third place	1968 Mexico City	coxless fours

Pier Angelo Conti-Manzini (30 June 1946 – 28 October 2003) was an Italian rower who competed in the 1968 Summer Olympics and in the 1972 Summer Olympics.

He was born in Gera Lario and died in Sagnino, Como.

In 1968, he was a crew member of the Italian boat which won the bronze medal in the coxless fours event.

Four years later, he finished tenth with the Italian boat in the 1972 coxless four competition.
