= Renato Bosatta =

Italian rower (born 1938)

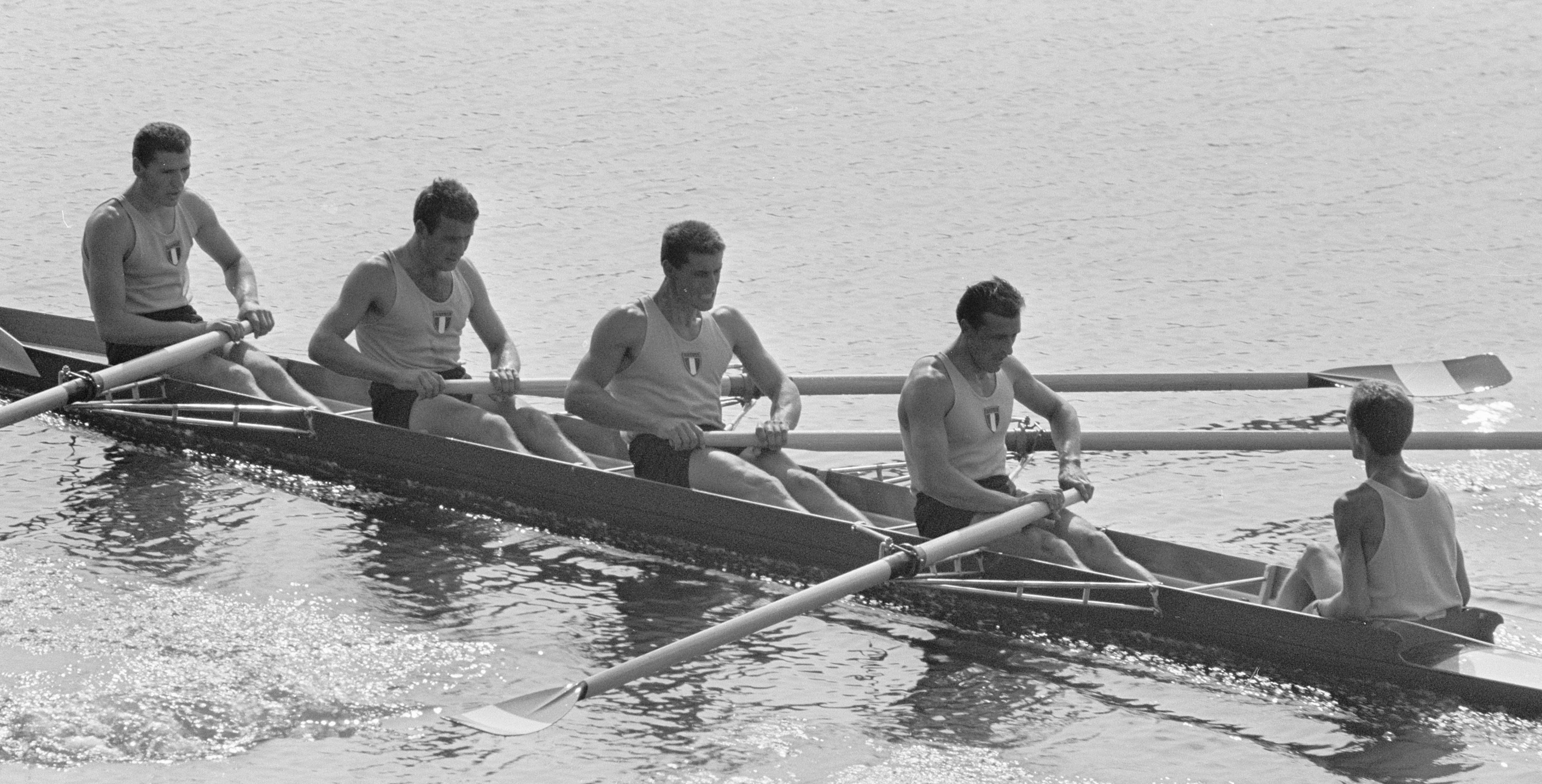
- Italian coxed four at the 1964 European Championships, Bosatta is second from right

Personal information
- Born: 11 February 1938 (age 88) Pianello del Lario, Italy
- Height: 1.80 m (5 ft 11 in)
- Weight: 79 kg (174 lb)

Sport
- Sport: Rowing
- Club: Canottieri Falk Dongo
Medal record
Men's rowing
Representing Italy
Olympic Games
Silver medal – second place	1960 Rome	Coxless four
Silver medal – second place	1964 Tokyo	Coxed four
Bronze medal – third place	1968 Mexico City	Coxless four
European Rowing Championships
Gold medal – first place	1961 Prague	Coxless four
Bronze medal – third place	1964 Amsterdam	Coxed four

Renato Bosatta (born 11 February 1938) is a retired Italian rower. He won a silver medal at the 1960 Summer Olympics and a European title in 1961 in the coxless fours. He then changed to the coxed fours and won a silver medal at the 1964 Summer Olympics and a bronze at the 1964 European Championships. At the 1968 Games he again competed in the coxless fours and won a bronze medal.
