= Volhard =

Volhard is a surname. Notable people with the surname include:

- Franz Volhard (1872–1950), German internist
- Christiane Nüsslein-Volhard (born 1942), German biologist and the Nobel Laureate
- Jacob Volhard (1834–1910), German chemist

== See also ==
- Volkhart
