= Emanoil Stratan =

Romanian rower

Personal information
- Nationality: Romanian
- Born: 22 July 1940 (age 85) Negrești, Romania

Sport
- Sport: Rowing

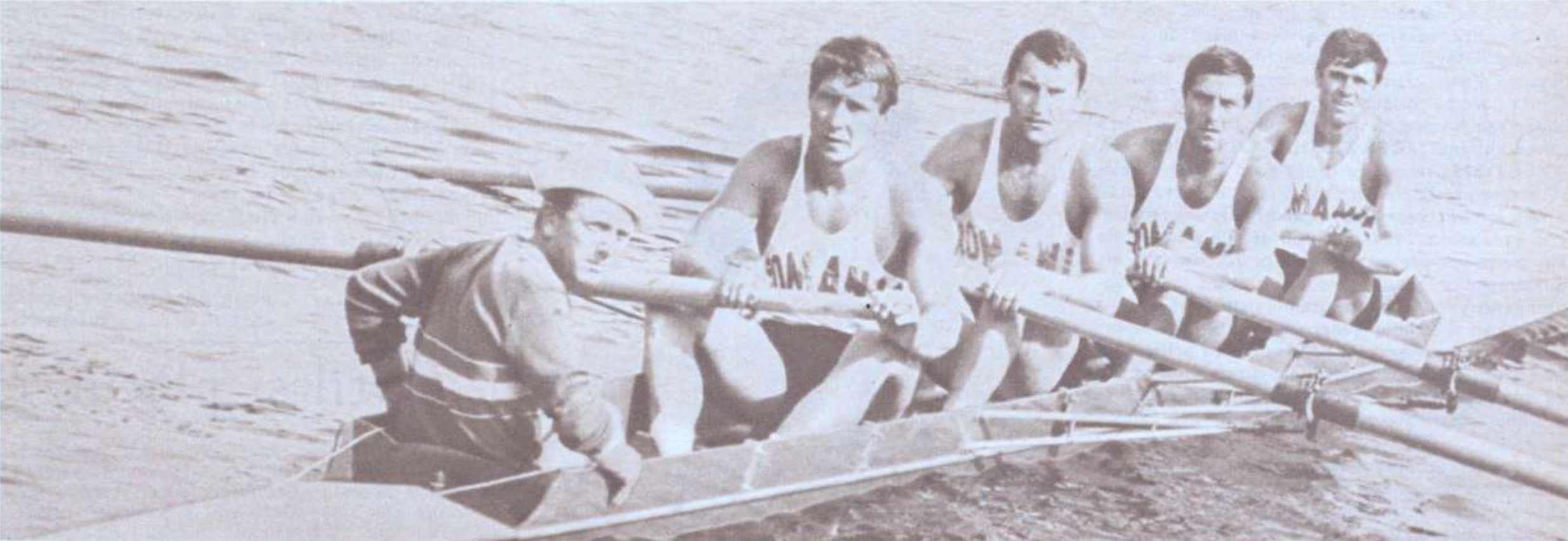
1967 Bronze medalists at the European Union. Ladislau Lovrenschi, Stefan Tudor, Emanoil Stratan, Petre Ceapura, Reinhold Batschi.

Emanoil Stratan (born 22 July 1940) is a Romanian rower. He competed in the men's coxless four event at the 1968 Summer Olympics.
