= Gunner Nielsen =

Danish rower (born 1944)

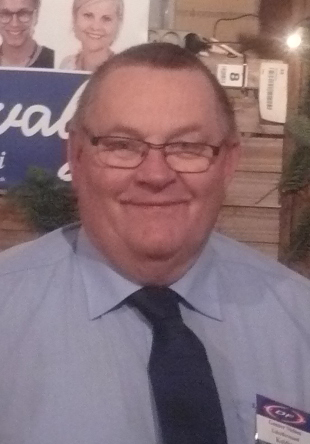
- Nielsen in 2012

Personal information
- Nationality: Danish
- Born: 1 January 1944 (age 82) Frederiksberg, Denmark

Sport
- Sport: Rowing

Gunner Nielsen (born 1 January 1944) is a Danish rower. He competed in the men's coxless four event at the 1968 Summer Olympics.
