= Michel Beissière =

French rower

Personal information
- Nationality: French
- Born: 14 January 1948 (age 77)

Sport
- Sport: Rowing

Michel Beissière (born 14 January 1948) is a French rower. He competed in the men's coxless four event at the 1968 Summer Olympics.
