= Patrick Sellier =

French rower

Personal information
- Nationality: French
- Born: 20 January 1948 (age 77); Sur Marne, France

Sport
- Sport: Rowing

Patrick Sellier (born 20 January 1948) is a French rower. He competed at the 1968 Summer Olympics and the 1972 Summer Olympics.
