= Charles Hamlin (rower) =

American rower (1947–2021)

Personal information
- Born: March 28, 1947 Northampton, Massachusetts, United States
- Died: May 23, 2021 (aged 74)

Sport
- Sport: Rowing

Charles Hamlin (March 28, 1947 – May 23, 2021) was an American rower. He competed in the men's coxless four event at the 1968 Summer Olympics. He graduated from Harvard University and Harvard Business School.
