= Elmārs Rubīns =

Soviet rower (1944–2007)

Personal information
- Born: 12 December 1944 Daugavpils, Latvian SSR, Soviet Union
- Died: 10 September 2007 (aged 62)
- Height: 193 cm (6 ft 4 in)
- Weight: 87 kg (192 lb)

Sport
- Sport: Rowing
Medal record
Men's rowing
Representing the Soviet Union
World Rowing Championships
Silver medal – second place	1966 Bled	Eight
European Rowing Championships
Silver medal – second place	1965 Duisburg	Eight

Elmārs Rubīns (12 December 1944 – 10 September 2007) was a Soviet rower from Latvia. Rubīns was born in Daugavpils, Latvia. At the 1965 European Rowing Championships in Duisburg, he won silver with the men's eight. At the 1966 World Rowing Championships in Bled, he won silver with the men's eight. He competed at the 1968 Summer Olympics in Mexico City with the men's coxless four where they came eleventh.
