= József Csermely =

Hungarian rower (born 1945)

Personal information
- Born: 3 January 1945 (age 81) Kunhegyes, Kingdom of Hungary

Sport
- Sport: Rowing
Medal record
Representing Hungary
Men's rowing
Silver medal – second place	1968 Mexico City	Coxless four
European Rowing Championships
Silver medal – second place	1967 Vichy	Coxless four
Silver medal – second place	1969 Klagenfurt	Coxless four

József Csermely (born 3 January 1945) is a Hungarian rower who competed in the 1968 Summer Olympics and in the 1972 Summer Olympics.

He was born in Kunhegyes.

In 1968 he was a crew member of the Hungarian boat which won the silver medal in the coxless fours event.

Four years later he was eliminated with the Hungarian boat in the repechage of the coxless four competition.
