= Sturdza Palace =

- Palatul Sturdza (Romanian)
- Castelul Sturdza de la Miclăușeni
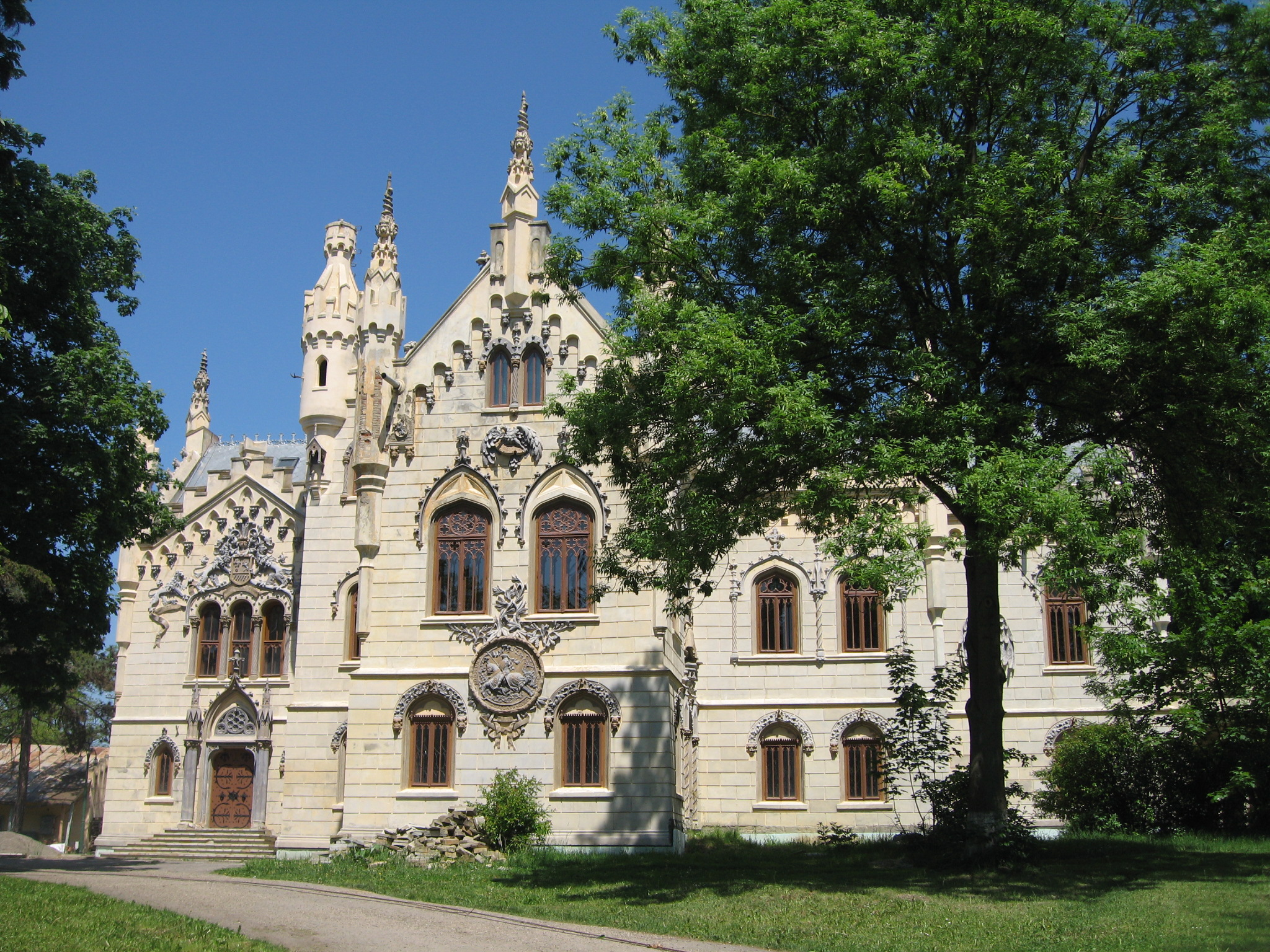
- The Sturdza Palace in Miclăușeni, Iași County

- Location within Romania
- 47°4′N 26°55′E
- Location: Butea, Iași County, Romania

History
- Built: 1598
- Demolished: circa 1740-1750; 1880
- Rebuilt: 1754; 1880-1904

Site notes
- Architect(s): Iulius Reinecke and I. Grigsberg.
- Architectural style: Gothic Revival
- Governing body: Metropolis of Moldavia and Bukovina
- Website: www.miclauseni.ro

Monument istoric
- Type: Architectural Monument of National Interest
- Designated: 2015
- Part of: National Register of Historic Monuments (Romanian: Lista Monumentelor Istorice (LMI))
- Reference no.: LMI: IS-II-m-B-04199.02

The Sturdza Palace at Miclăușeni, or Sturdza Castle at Miclăușeni (Romanian: Castelul Sturdza de la Miclăușeni), is a historic monument in the village of Miclăușeni, Iași County, at a distance of 65 km (40 mi) from the city of Iași. It is part of the Miclăușeni Historic Monastery complex, designated by the Romanian Ministry of Culture and National Patrimony in 2015. The historic complex is composed of the following monuments:

- The Church of the Holy Princes and Annunciation (Biserica "Sf. Voievozi", "Buna Vestire"), dating from 1787 and having LMI code: IS-II-m-B-04199.01;
- The Sturdza Palace, dating from the 17th century, with LMI code: IS-II-M-B-04199.02;
- The Miclăușeni Monastery Park, dating from the 18th century and being listed as LMI: IS-II-M-B-04199.03

== History ==
=== Original manor ===
In 1410, Voivode Alexander the Good (Alexandru cel Bun) granted a fief to boyar and member of Sfatul Domnesc ("Prince's Council"), Miclăuș, an estate located near the Siret River plains. After the death of the nobleman, the estate became known by his namesake, Miclăușeni. On April 25, 1591, the nobleman's descendants sold the estate to treasurer Simon Stroici (1550–1623), who built a mansion on the property and fortified the village of Miclăușeni in 1598. The ruins of the first mansion could still be seen as late as the beginning of the twentieth century.

In his last will and testament dated June 5, 1622, Simon Stroici bequeathed the estate and village of Miclăușeni to Lupu Prăjăscu, stating:

Lupului Prăjăscului și nepoatei mele Saftei, și fiului meu, la Gligorie, cu heleștee și cu prisăci și cu tot venitul, pentru că i-am luat spre dânșii ca să-mi fie ei ficiori de suflet.

To Lupul Prăjăscu and my niece, Safta, and my son, Gligorie, with ponds and with land and with all of the income, because I have taken them to be my soul family.

In 1697, the descendants of Lupu Prăjăscu, who had no survivors, gave the estate to distant relatives, brothers Ion and Sandu Sturdza. On April 19, 1699, the Sturdza brothers divided the estate with Miclăușeni being awarded to Ion Sturdza. Feudal peasants and gypsies worked the land, whose descendants to this day have surnames describing their feudal professions; Bucătaru(Chef), Muraru (Mill worker), Pitaru (Baker), Curelaru (leather cutter), Mindirigiu (mattress maker), Bivolaru (livestock herder), Surugiu (coachman), as described in the book "Castelul Miclăușeni în cultura română" (Miclăușeni Castle and Romanian Culture), Ed. "Cronica", Iași, 1996.

In 1752, Lord Ioan Sturdza rebuilt the boyar mansion, building it with a semi-basement and cross-shaped ground level. The mansion had 20 rooms, ten of them on each floor. Race horses were housed in the Manor's stable. The floor and ceilings were made of wood beams and wood planks. It is said that the housekeepers had their work cut out for them dealing with the mice and bugs that roamed the residence, with the Master of the Manor giving the following orders:

"să se puie în var vreo doftorie de ploșniță și să speli cu aceea și podelele pe sus cu badanaua", în timp ce "bortele de șoareci să se astupe toate cu cărbuni pisați cu steclă"

Upon this place you will rub medicinal powder to kill the bedbugs which are to be embedded in the paint, and to wash the ceilings in said medicine. The holes where mice come and go shall be plugged with crushed coal and ground glass

Concerned with the expansion of the estate, the son of Ion Sturdza, Dimitrie, built a church in the vicinity of the palace in 1821–1823. He adorned the church with baroque-style icons and numerous valuable objects. The son of Dimitrie, Alecu Sturdza Miclăușanu, built a park of 42 hectares (100 acres) all stylized as an English Garden with ornamental tree species and numerous flower beds. Alecu, as a hobby, dealt in the collection and preservation of rare books and manuscripts, which further added to the richness of the Palace. Even future Prime Minister Mihail Kogălniceanu spoke of the rare books and manuscripts collected by the estate.

Although cousin to Prince Mihail Sturdza (1834–1849), Alecu Sturdza embraced the ideas of the Revolutionaries of 1848. He died in 1848 of cholera, under suspicion that he was poisoned by the Prince. His mark upon the estate was a high degree of maintenance and precision regarding the English Gardens and Park on the estate grounds. He was buried in the manor's church, leaving the estate to his widow Catina. She passed the estate to her son, George A. Sturdza, in 1863, who built the Sturdza Palace as seen today.

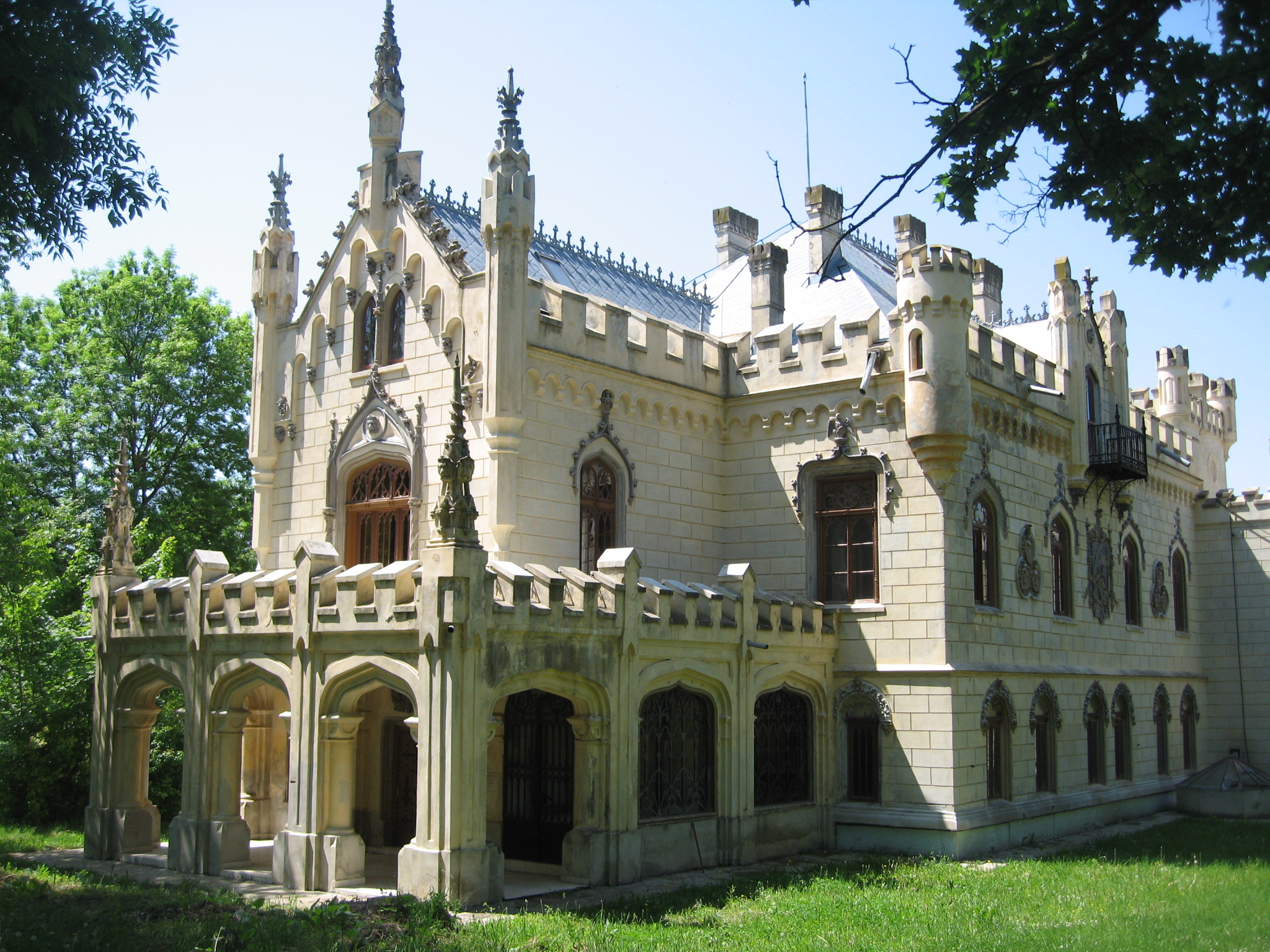
Sturdza Palace at Miclăușeni

=== Construction of the palace ===
In 1869, George Sturdza married Maria, the daughter of writer Ion Ghica, moving the family into the Manor. Maria, 11 years younger than George, was unsettled in her new environment and in the Manor. Eager to remake the Manor building, George Sturdza sold off several forests from the Estate and took out a loan of 100,000 Lei from the Romanian Land Credit Society ("Societatea de Credit Funciar Român"). He placed the Miclăuşeni Estate as collateral, agreeing to pay back the debts in gold coins.

Between 1880 and 1904, George Sturdza built on the site of the old Manor the late Gothic architectural palace that exists today. He wanted the Palace complex to mimic the feudal castles of the West, also be reminiscent of the Palace of Culture in Iași, and lastly also of the Lord Alexandru Cuza's palace in Ruginoasa.

The Palace was used as a home for orphans under Communist rule, counter to the wishes of daughter Catherine Sturdza who became a nun and donated the property to become a nunnery, which it finally became in 1990.

=== Palace restoration ===
In 2001, the palace was retroceded to the Metropolitanate of Moldavia and Bukovina. On 13 October 2001, the Orphanage was relocated to the village of Cozmești, in the commune of Stolniceni-Prăjescu.

In 2003, director Sergiu Nicolaescu shot some scenes from the movie "Orient Express" at the Palace of Miclăușeni.

By Government Decision no. 1170 of 2 October 2003, it was established, among other things, to carry out emergency repairs to the Sturdza Palace and landscaping works in the adjacent areas. In 2004, having obtained a World Bank grant of approximately 2.4 million lei (685,700 euros), the Metropolitanate of Moldavia and Bukovina began the restoration of the palace and its outbuildings.

Consolidation and restoration work was carried out on the building and outbuildings, followed by works caused by groundwater infiltration. Large and small decorative elements that had been lost were reconstructed from photographs. Pieces of wooden furniture, in particular doors, windows, wainscoting, interior wooden staircases and the original parquet flooring were restored and conserved in 2003–2005.

Restoration work has not been fully completed. The Metropolitanate of Moldavia plans to set up a museum complex and a conference centre here, while the other buildings will house a day centre for the elderly and a pilgrimage centre. One of the buildings has already become a painting studio, where icons and decorated eggs were made.

== Architecture ==
The Palace from Miclăușeni is built in Neo-Gothic style with Baroque elements. The construction was built at the end of the 19th century, on the site of an older 18th century manor house, part of the old construction being incorporated into the current building, which is located in the eastern wing of the castle.

Sturdza Palace has a first floor and an attic. The exterior walls of the building have been adorned with numerous ornamentations in high relief, including blazonries inspired by the Sturdza family coat of arms: a lion with a sword and an olive branch, or symbolic elements, made in 1898 in Art Nouveau style by the architect Iulius Reinecke. He had been helped by Maria Sturdza, who had illustrated many of the poems of Vasile Alecsandri, a neighbour and close friend of the Sturdza family.

The neo-Gothic influences can be seen in decorations such as Gothic turrets, medieval armor, a manège hall, Latin dictons inscribed on the walls, an entrance tower with a bridge over the moat.

Inside, the castle had central staircases made of Dalmatian marble, meticulously carved rosewood furniture, terracotta, porcelain and earthenware stoves brought from abroad, parquet floors inlaid with sycamore, mahogany, oak and ebony, made by Austrian craftsmen and featuring geometric and floral motifs. The ceilings and interior walls were painted in oil, with numerous Latin dictons inscribed on them.

The wooden components of the building (doors, windows, wainscoting, interior staircases) are made of oak, lime and resinous wood, and are richly carved, profiled, fretworked and polished with shellac to furniture-style.

== See also ==
- Sturdza Family
