= Mogens Pedersen (rower, born 1944) =

Danish rower

Personal information
- Nationality: Danish
- Born: 27 February 1944 (age 81); Frederiksberg, Denmark

Sport
- Sport: Rowing

Mogens Pedersen (born 27 February 1944) is a Danish rower. He competed in the men's coxless four event at the 1968 Summer Olympics.
