= Pavel Ilyinsky =

Soviet rower

Personal information
- Born: 25 June 1944 (age 82) Leningrad, Russian SFSR, Soviet Union
- Height: 189 cm (6 ft 2 in)
- Weight: 84 kg (185 lb)

Sport
- Sport: Rowing
Medal record
Men's rowing
Representing the Soviet Union
World Rowing Championships
Silver medal – second place	1966 Bled	Eight

Pavel Ilyinsky (Russian name: Павел Ильинский; born 25 June 1944) is a Soviet rower from Russia.

Ilyinsky was born in Leningrad, Soviet Union. At the 1966 World Rowing Championships in Bled, he won silver with the men's eight. He competed at the 1968 Summer Olympics in Mexico City with the men's coxless four where they came eleventh. Ilyinsky later became a rowing coach in his home city.
