= Vitolds Barkāns =

Soviet-Latvian rower

Personal information
- Born: 8 May 1944 (age 80); Riga, Reichskommissariat Ostland
- Height: 191 cm (6 ft 3 in)
- Weight: 86 kg (190 lb)

Sport
- Sport: Rowing

Vitolds Barkāns (born 8 May 1944) is a Soviet rower from Latvia. He competed at the 1968 Summer Olympics in Mexico City with the men's coxless four where they came eleventh.
