= Volkhart Buchter =

German rower

Personal information
- Born: 26 June 1944 (age 80); Śrem, Poland
- Height: 188 cm (6 ft 2 in)
- Weight: 87 kg (192 lb)

Sport
- Sport: Rowing

Volkhart Buchter (born 26 June 1944) is a German rower who represented West Germany. He competed at the 1968 Summer Olympics in Mexico City with the men's coxless four where they came sixth.
