= Franz Rentsch =

Swiss rower

Personal information
- Nationality: Swiss
- Born: 11 January 1943 (age 83) Zürich, Switzerland

Sport
- Sport: Rowing

Franz Rentsch (born 11 January 1943) is a Swiss rower. He competed at the 1968 Summer Olympics and the 1972 Summer Olympics.
