= Western Moldavia =

Historical region in present-day Romania

Western Moldavia Moldova Occidentală (Romanian)
- Historical region of Romania
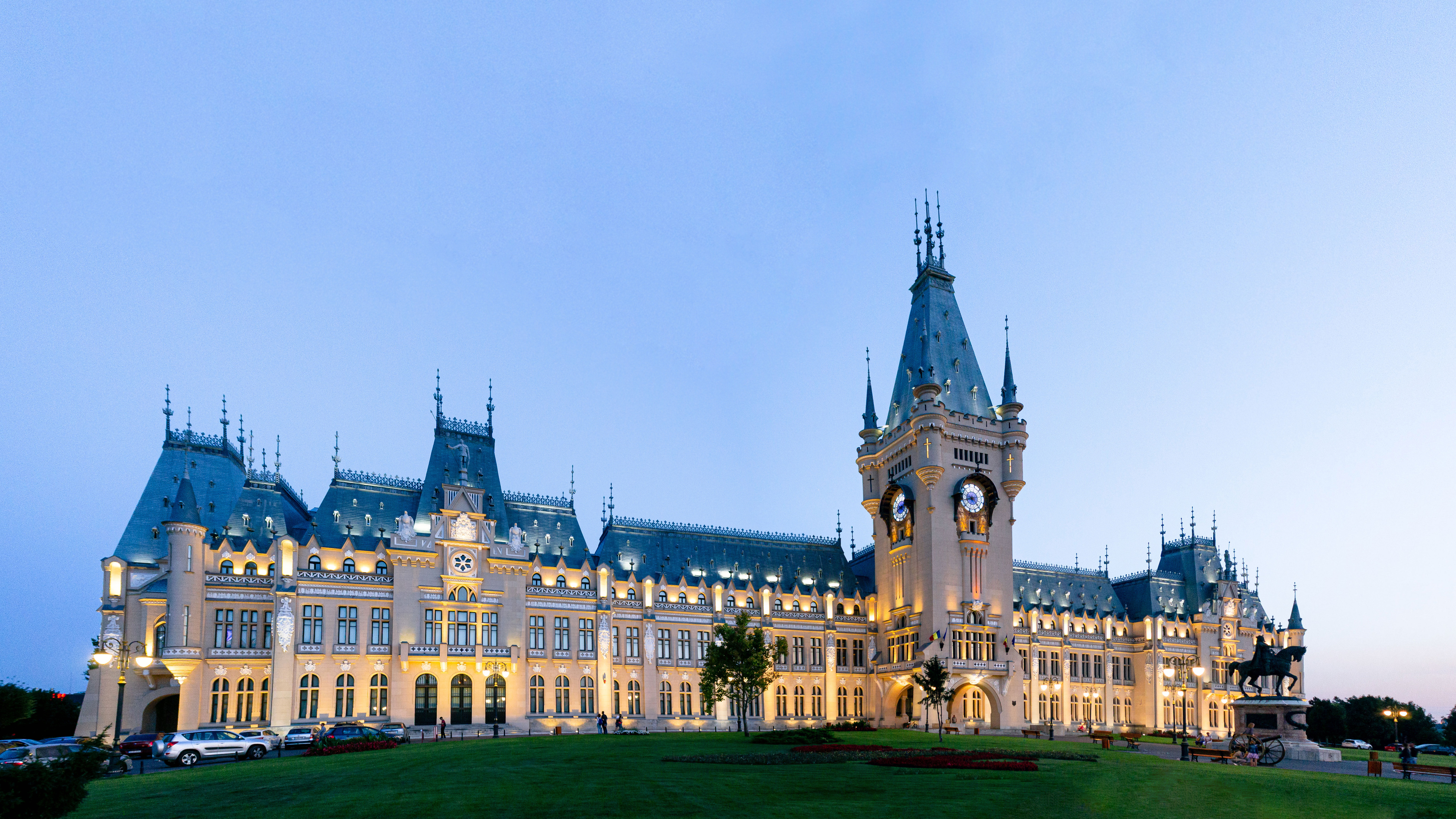
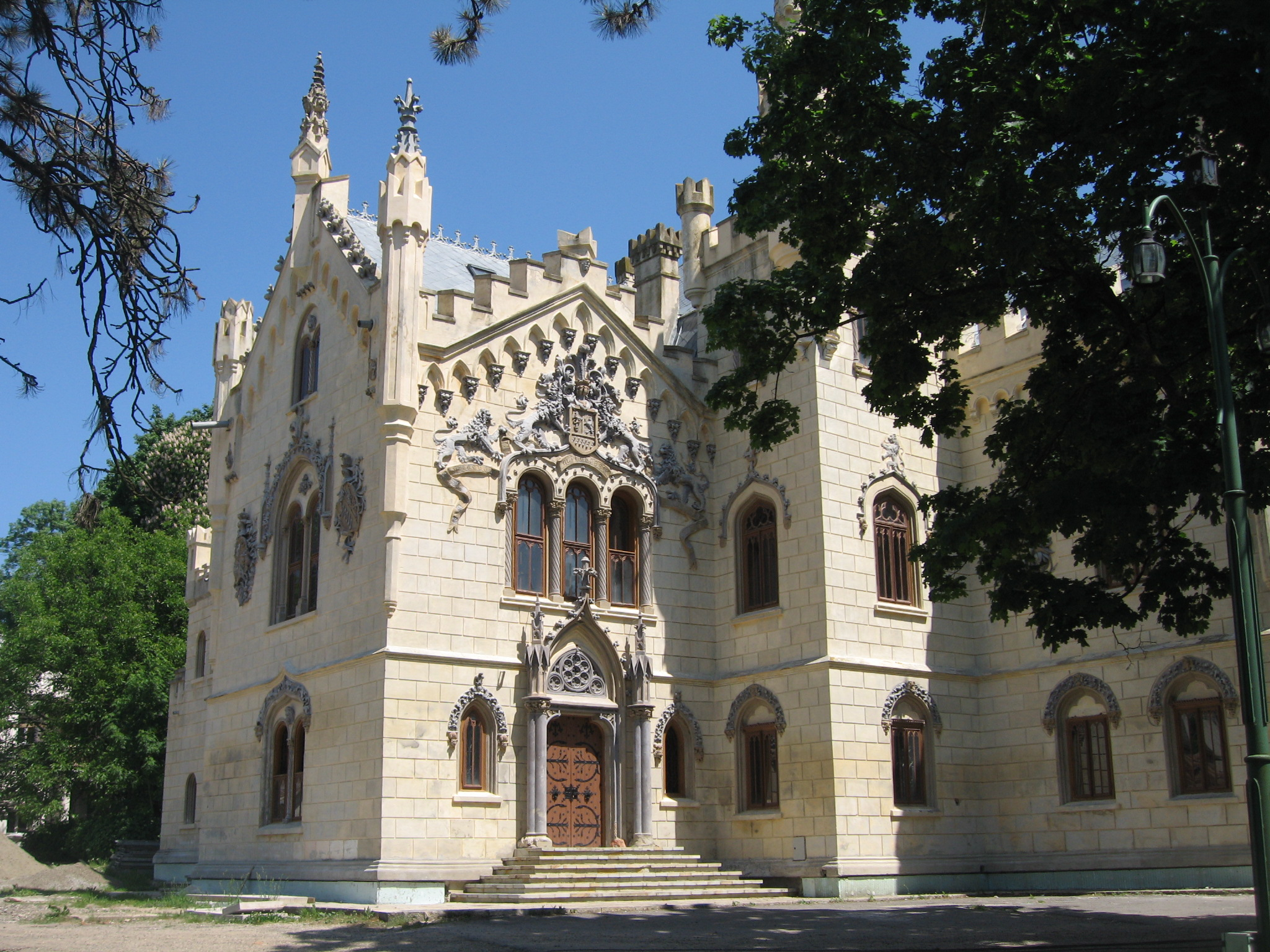
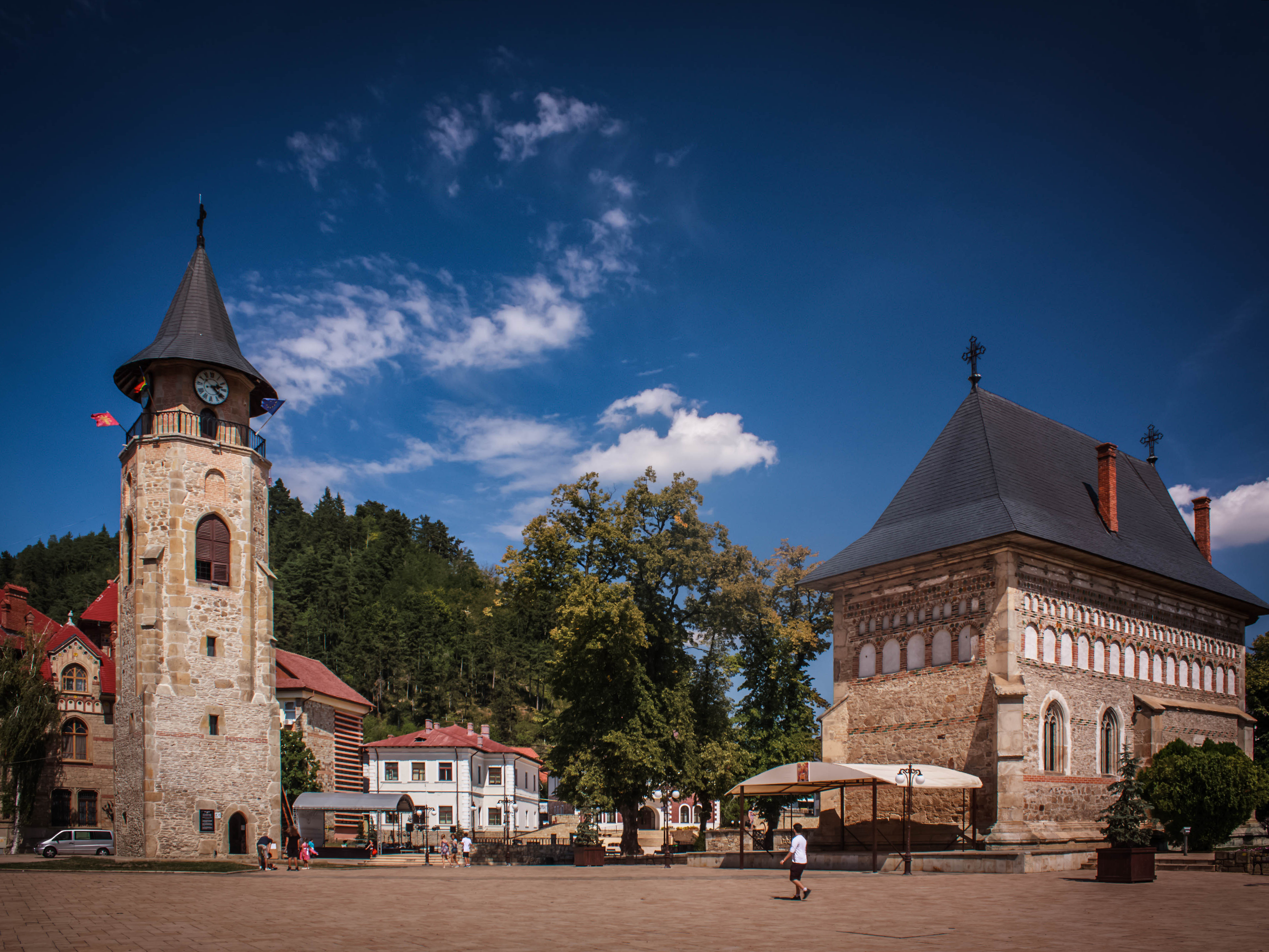
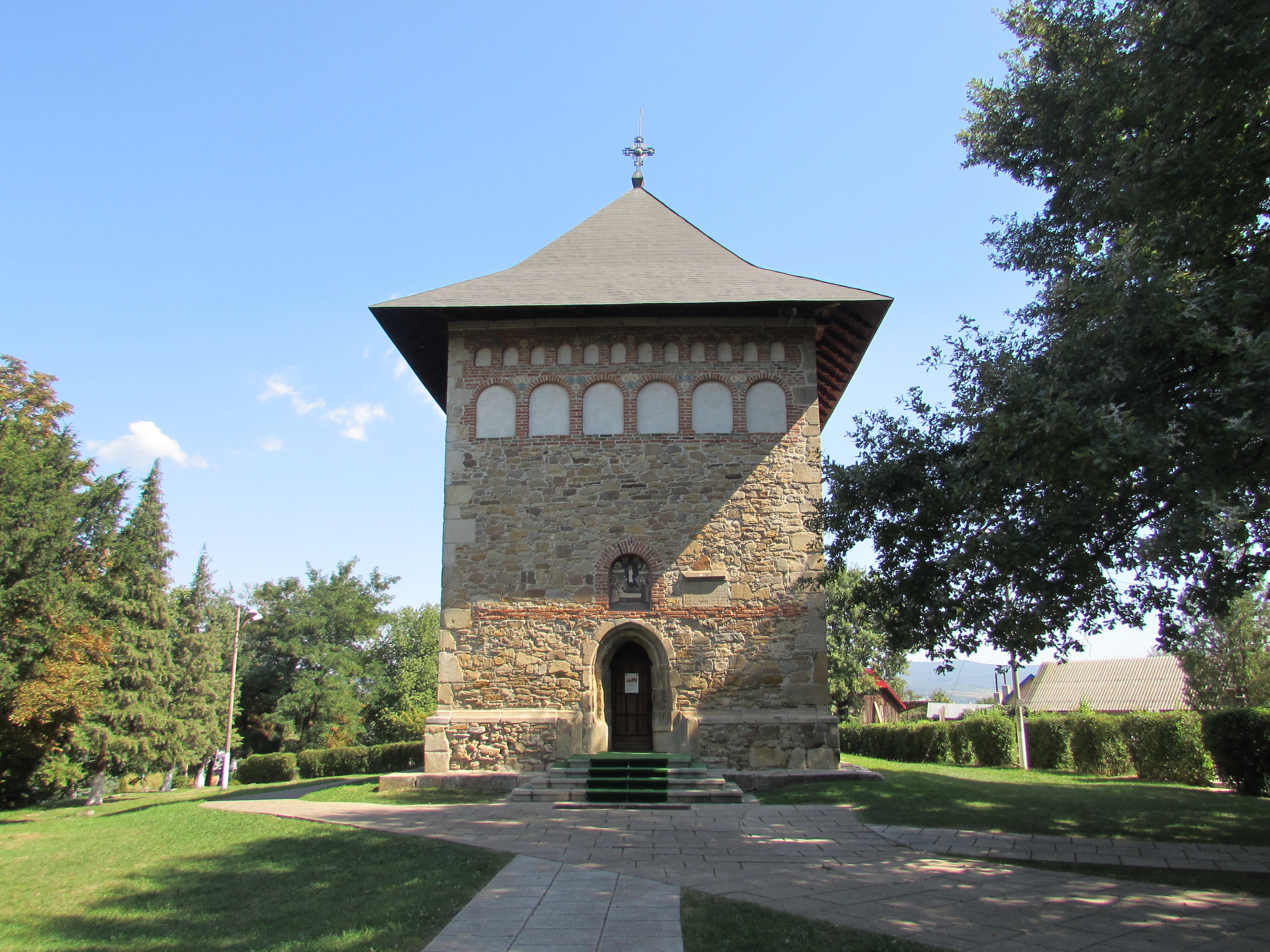
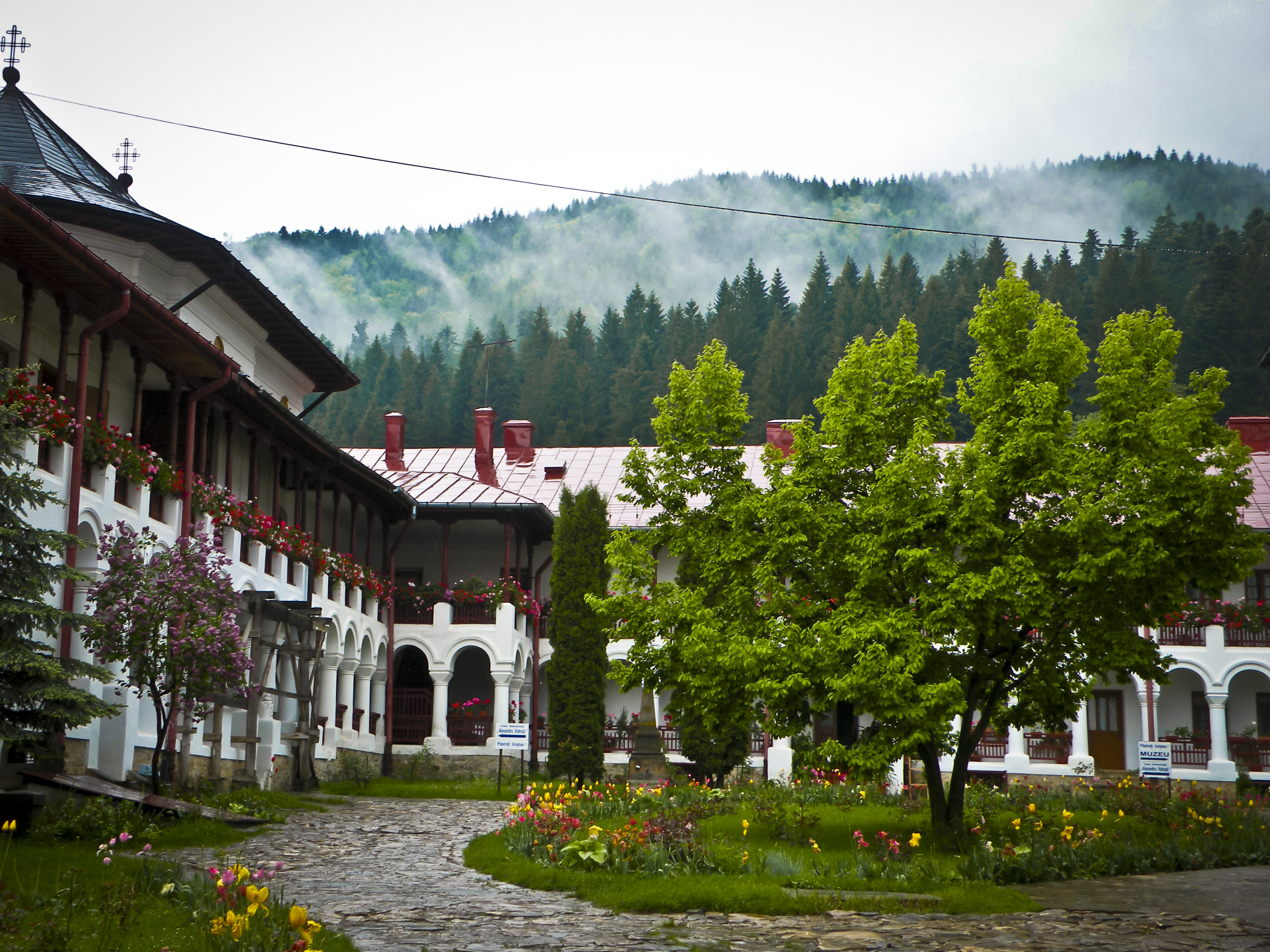
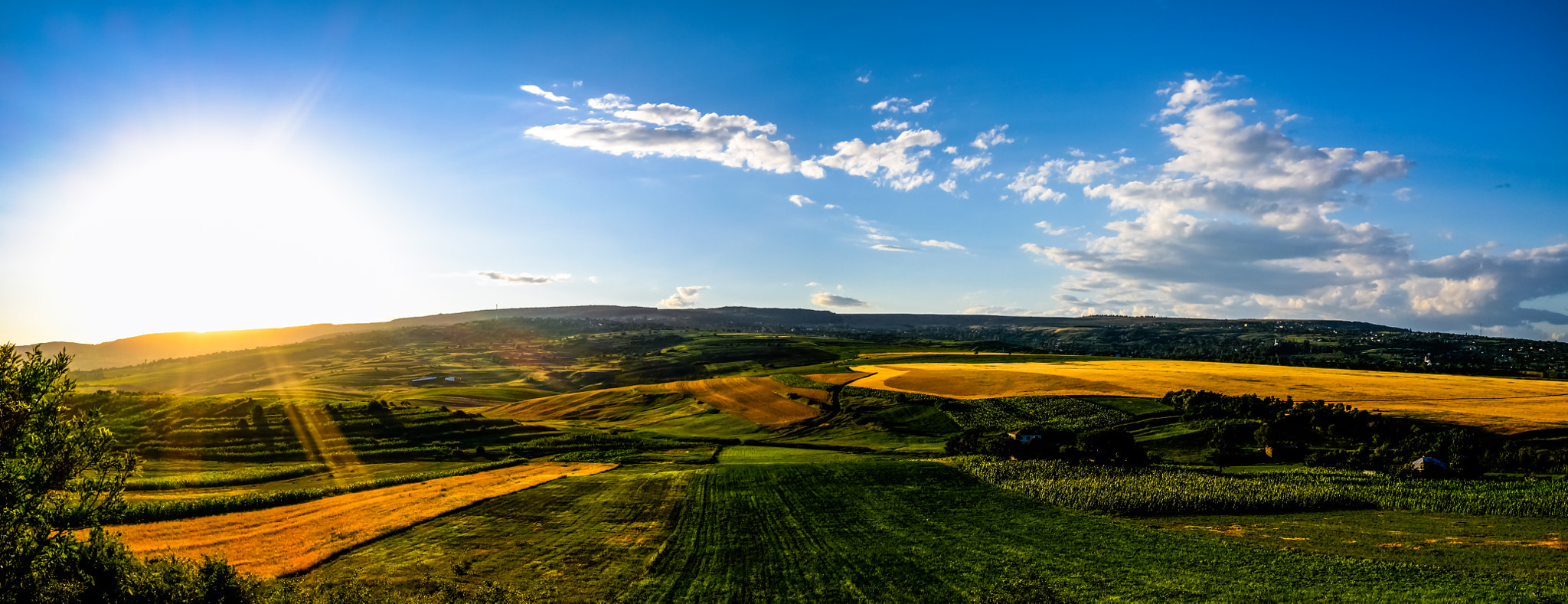
- Iași Palace of Culture Sturdza Palace Piatra Neamț Borzești Church Agapia Monastery Entrance in Botoșani County Danube seen from Galați

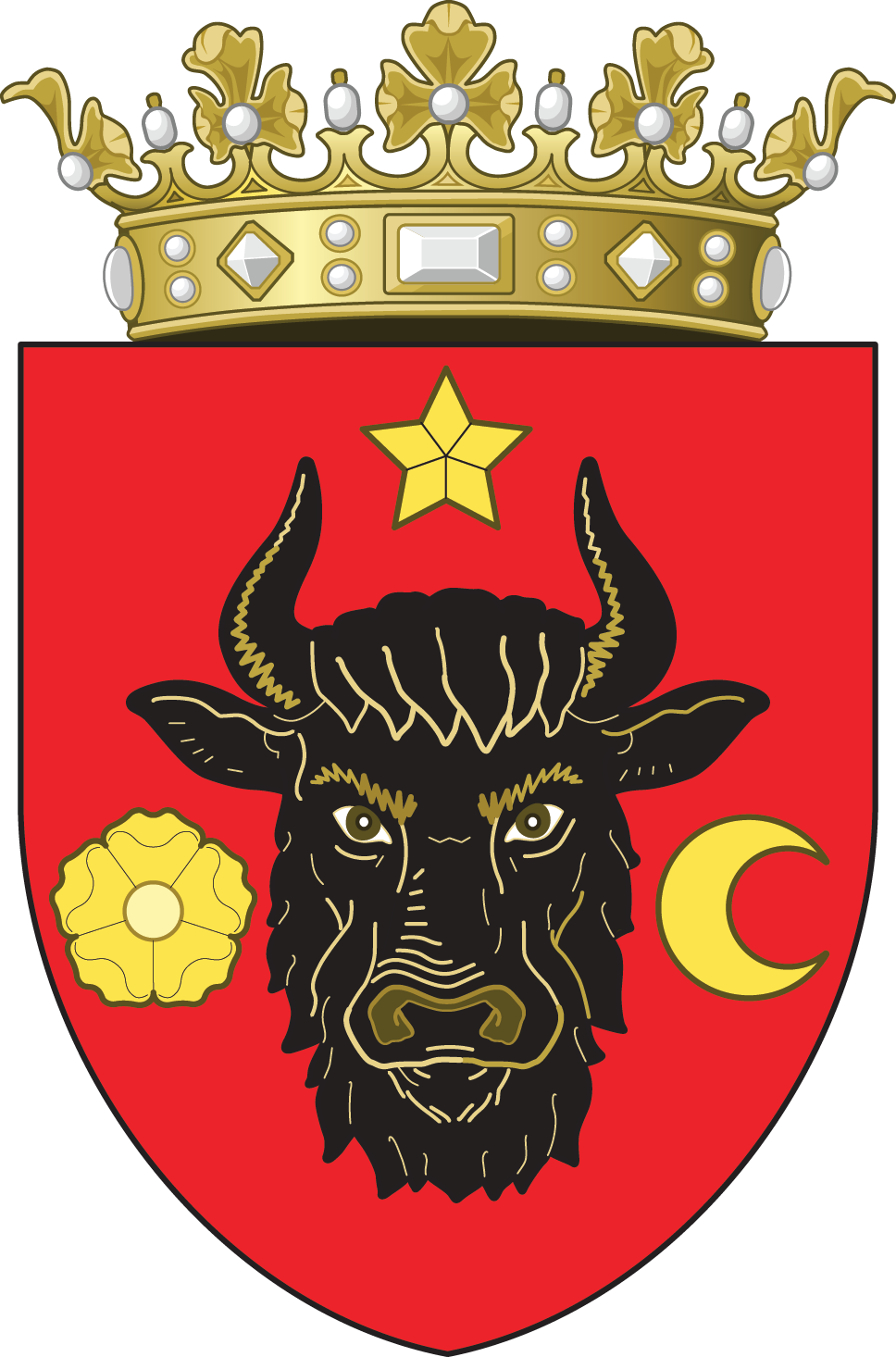
- Coat of arms

- Western Moldavia
- Country: Romania
- Largest city: Iași

Area
  - Total: 46,173 km^{2} (17,827 sq mi)

Population (2021 census)
  - Total: 4,058,640
  - Density: 87.901/km^{2} (227.66/sq mi)
- Demonym: Moldavian
- Time zone: UTC+2 (EET)
  - Summer (DST): UTC+3 (EEST)

Western Moldavia (Romanian: Moldova Occidentală, Moldova de Apus, or Moldova de Vest), also known as Romanian Moldavia, is the core historic and geographical part of the former Principality of Moldavia situated in eastern and north-eastern Romania. Until its union with Wallachia in 1859, the Principality of Moldavia also included, at various times in its history, the regions of Bessarabia (with the Budjak), all of Bukovina, and Hertsa; the larger part of the former is nowadays the independent state of Moldova, while the rest of it, the northern part of Bukovina, and Hertsa form territories of Ukraine.

Romanian Moldavia consists of eight counties, spanning over 18% of Romania's territory. Six out of the 8 counties make up Romania's designated Nord-Est development region, while the two southern counties are included within Romania's Sud-Est development region. It comprises roughly 48.67% of the wider region of Moldavia.

== Etymology ==
The names Moldavia and Moldova are derived from the name of the Moldova River; however, the etymology is not known and there are several variants:

A legend mentioned in Descriptio Moldaviae (1714) by Dimitrie Cantemir links it to an aurochs hunting trip of the voivode of the Voivodeship of Maramureș Dragoș and the latter's chase of a star-marked aurochs. Dragoș was accompanied by his female hound, called Molda; when they reached the shores of an unfamiliar river, Molda caught up with the animal and was killed by it. The dog's name would have been combined with the Romanian word for water, apă, and given to the river and extended to the country.

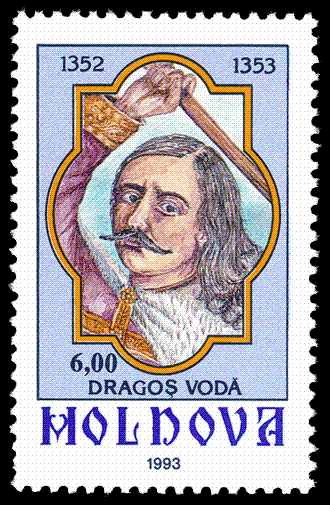
Stamp of Moldova - Dragoș, Voivode of Moldova

The Gothic Mulda (Gothic: 𐌼𐌿𐌻𐌳𐌰, ᛗᚢᛚᛞᚨ) meaning 'dust', 'dirt' (cognate with the English mould), referring to the river.

A Slavic etymology (-ova is a quite common Slavic suffix), marking the end of one Slavic genitive form, denoting ownership, chiefly of feminine nouns (i.e., 'that of Molda').

A landowner named Alexa Moldaowicz is mentioned in a 1334 document as a local boyar in service to Yuriy II of Halych; this attests to the use of the name before the foundation of the Moldavian state and could be the source for the region's name.

== Moldavian dialect ==
The delimitation of the Moldavian dialect, as with all other Romanian dialects, is made primarily by analyzing its phonetic features and only marginally by morphological, syntactical, and lexical characteristics.

The Moldavian dialect is the representative of the northern grouping of Romanian dialects and has influenced the Romanian spoken over large areas of Transylvania.

The Moldavian and the Wallachian dialects are the only two that have been consistently identified and recognized by linguists. They are clearly distinct in dialect classifications made by Heimann Tiktin, Mozes Gaster, Gustav Weigand, Sextil Pușcariu, Sever Pop, Emil Petrovici, Romulus Todoran, Ion Coteanu, Alexandru Philippide, Iorgu Iordan, Emanuel Vasiliu, and others, whereas the other dialects have been considerably more controversial and difficult to classify.

The Moldavian dialect is not synonymous with Moldovan language. The latter is another term for the Romanian language as used in the Republic of Moldova. The border between Romania and the Republic of Moldova does not correspond to any significant isoglosses to justify a dialectal division; phonetics and morphology (which define dialectal classifications) are identical across the border, whereas lexical differences are minimal.

It is worth mentioning however that while on the Romanian side the vocabulary was updated with words attributed by the arrival of modern technologies of the late 20th century and merged with Wallachian and Transilvanian dialects, on the Moldavian side the language remained somehow archaic, preserving more regionalisms, becoming a "time capsule" of the way how people spoke before the annexation of the region by the Soviet Union in 1940 through the Molotov–Ribbentrop pact.

== Administrative divisions ==
The area of the region is 46,173 km^{2} (17,827 sq mi) and covers 8 counties (Romanian: județ), in eastern and northeastern Romania: Bacău, Botoșani, Galați, Iași, Neamț, Suceava, Vaslui, and Vrancea.

Suceava County is also referred to as (the southern) part of Bukovina.

== Population ==
According to Romanian Census (2011) data, the region has a total population of 4,178,694 inhabitants (20.7% of Romania's population), distributed among the ethnic groups as follows:

- Romanians (98%), Roma (1.3%), others (0.7%);

The most populous cities as of 2011 census (metropolitan areas, as of 2014):

- Iași - 290,422 (465,477 in metropolitan area)
- Galați - 249,432 (323,563)
- Bacău - 144,307 (223,239)
- Botoșani - 106,847 (144,617)
- Suceava - 92,121 (144,100)
- Piatra Neamț - 85,055 (131,334)
- Focșani - 79,315 (125,699)
- Bârlad - 55,837 (91,151)
- Vaslui - 55,407
- Roman - 50,713 (98,378)
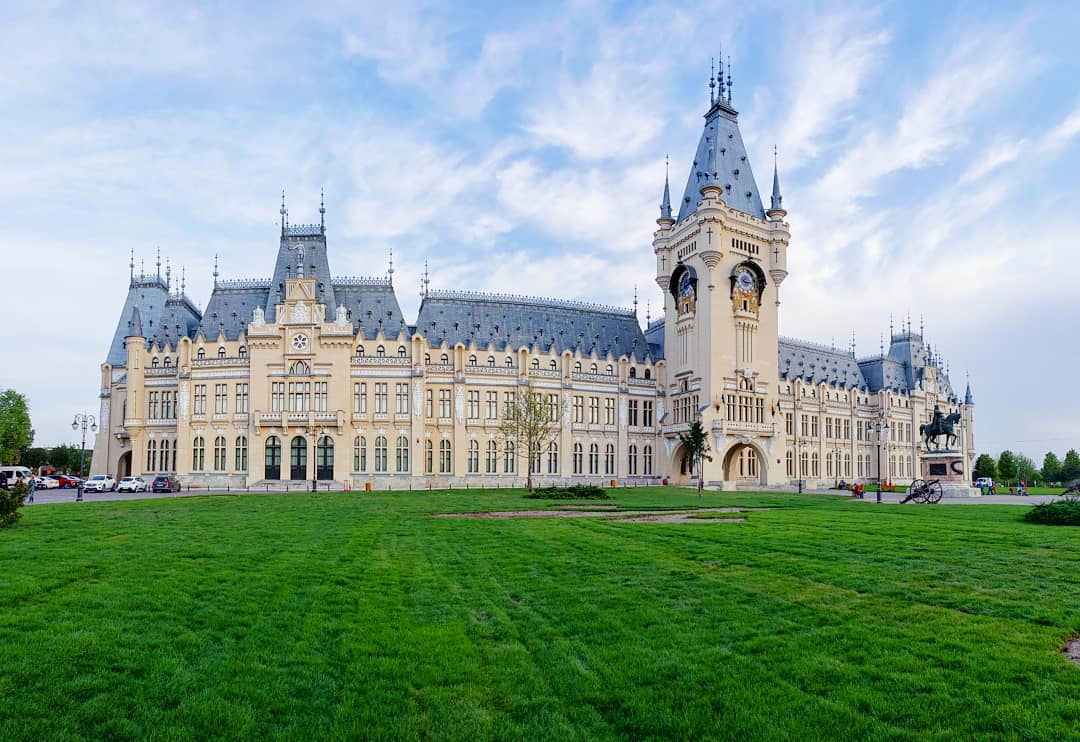
Iași

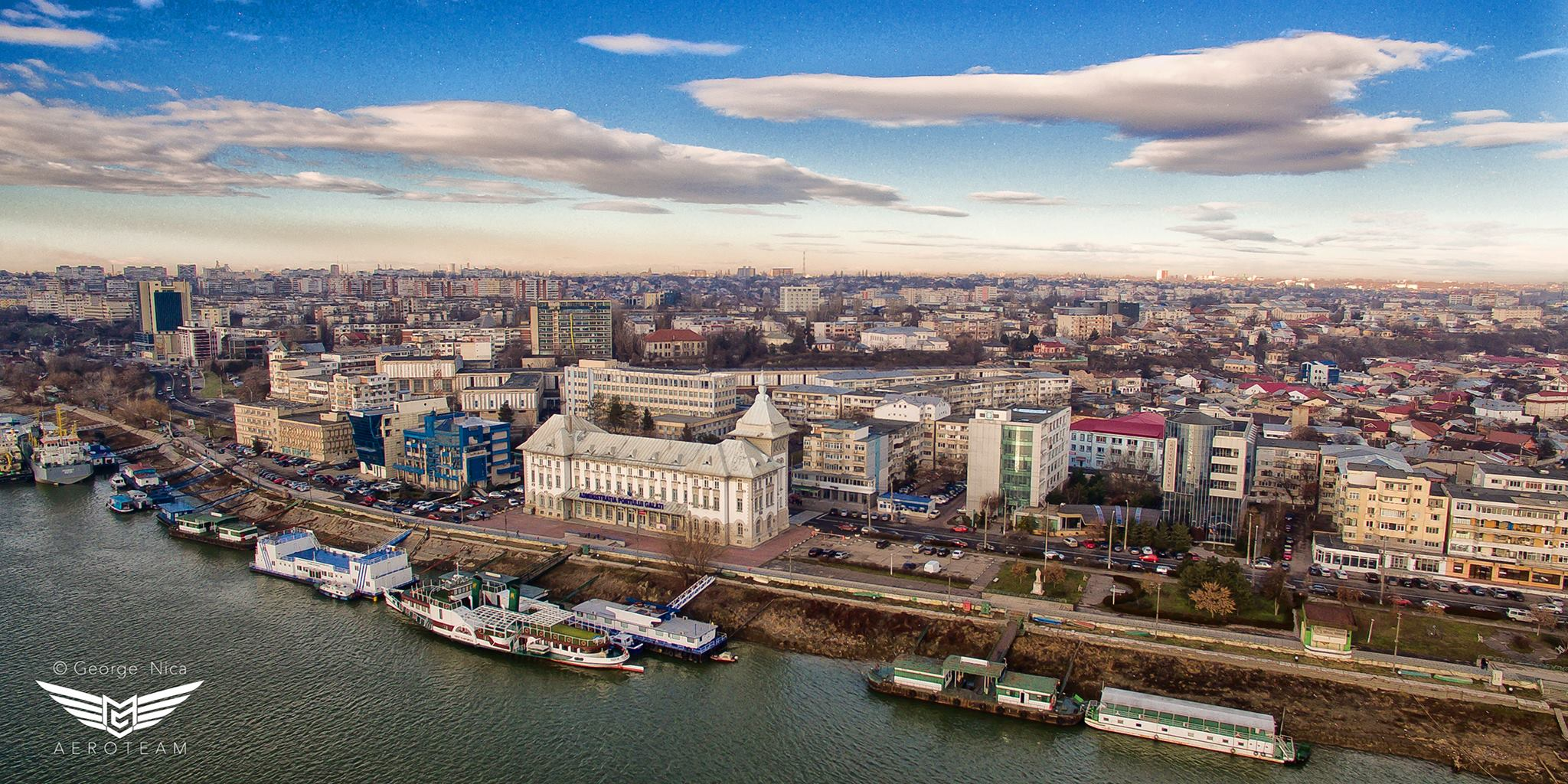
Galați

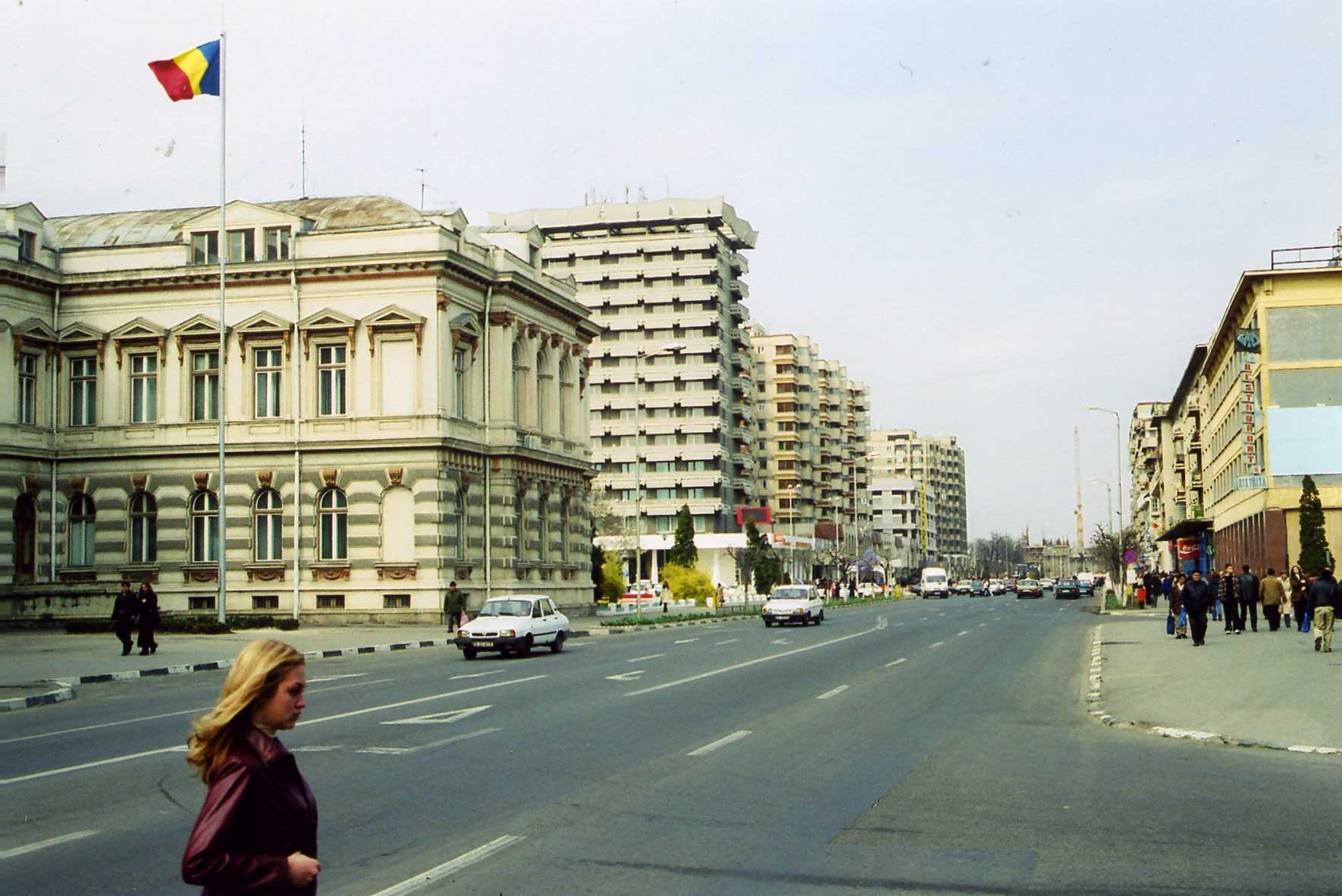
Bacău

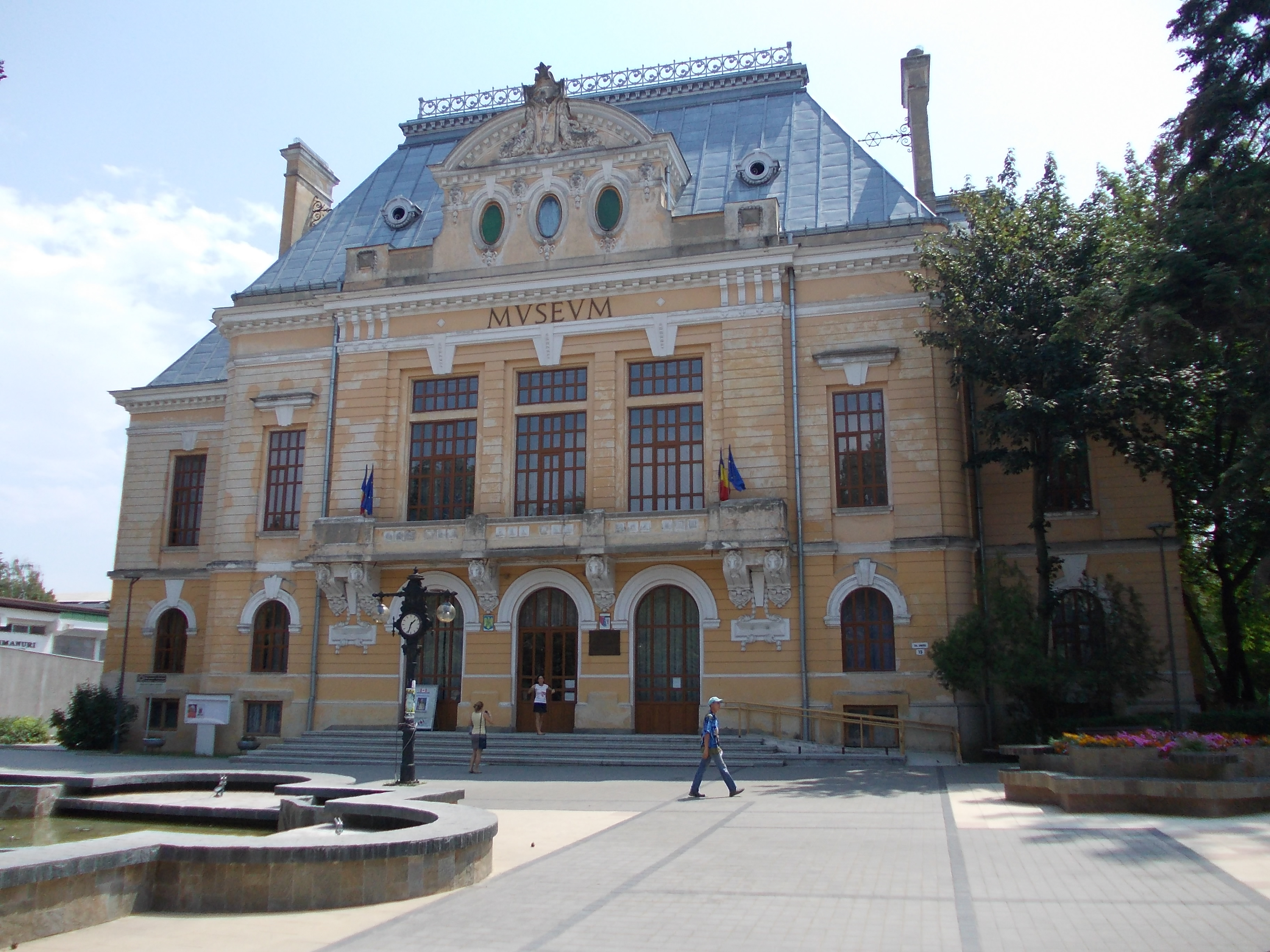
Botoșani

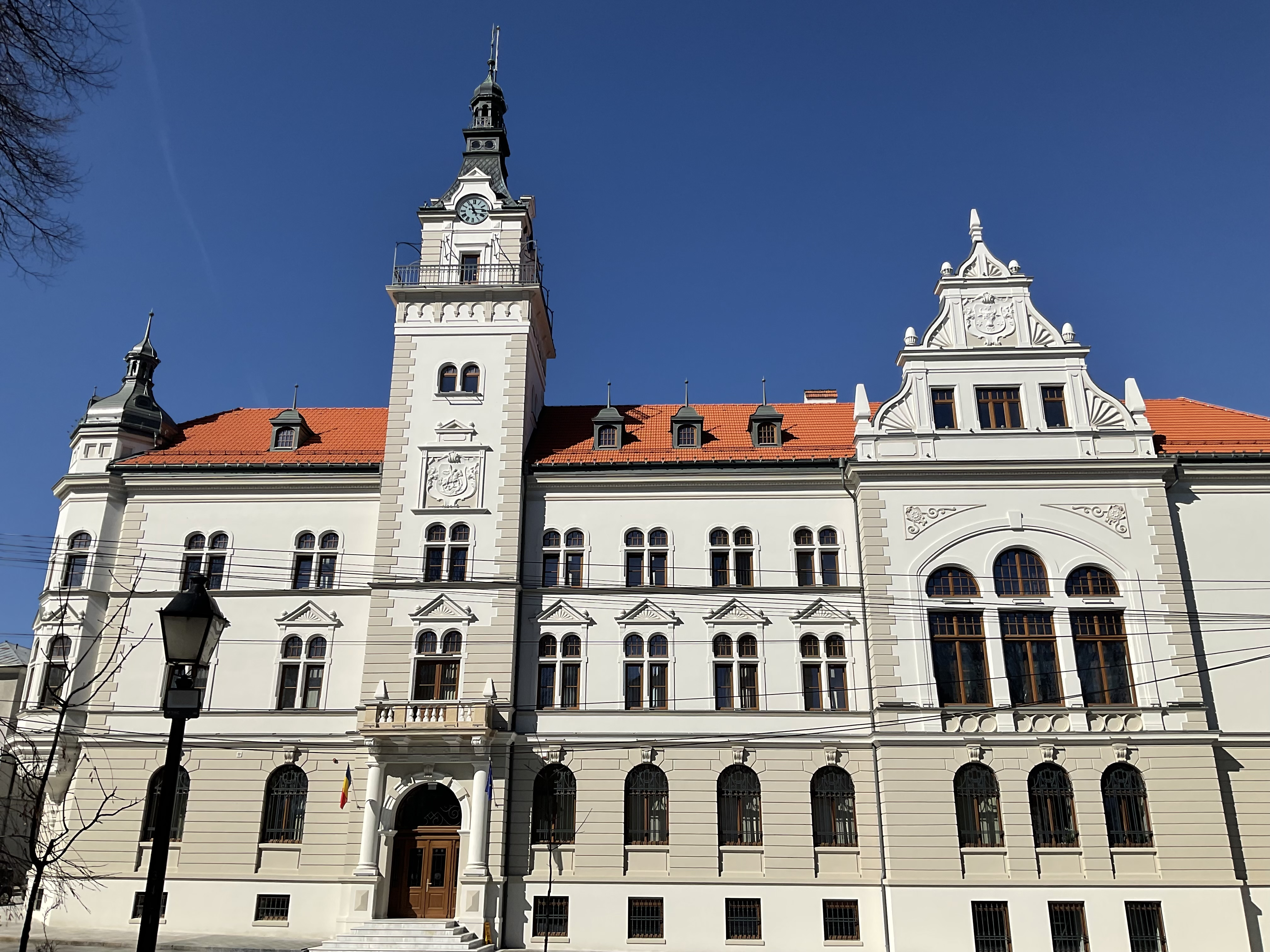
Suceava

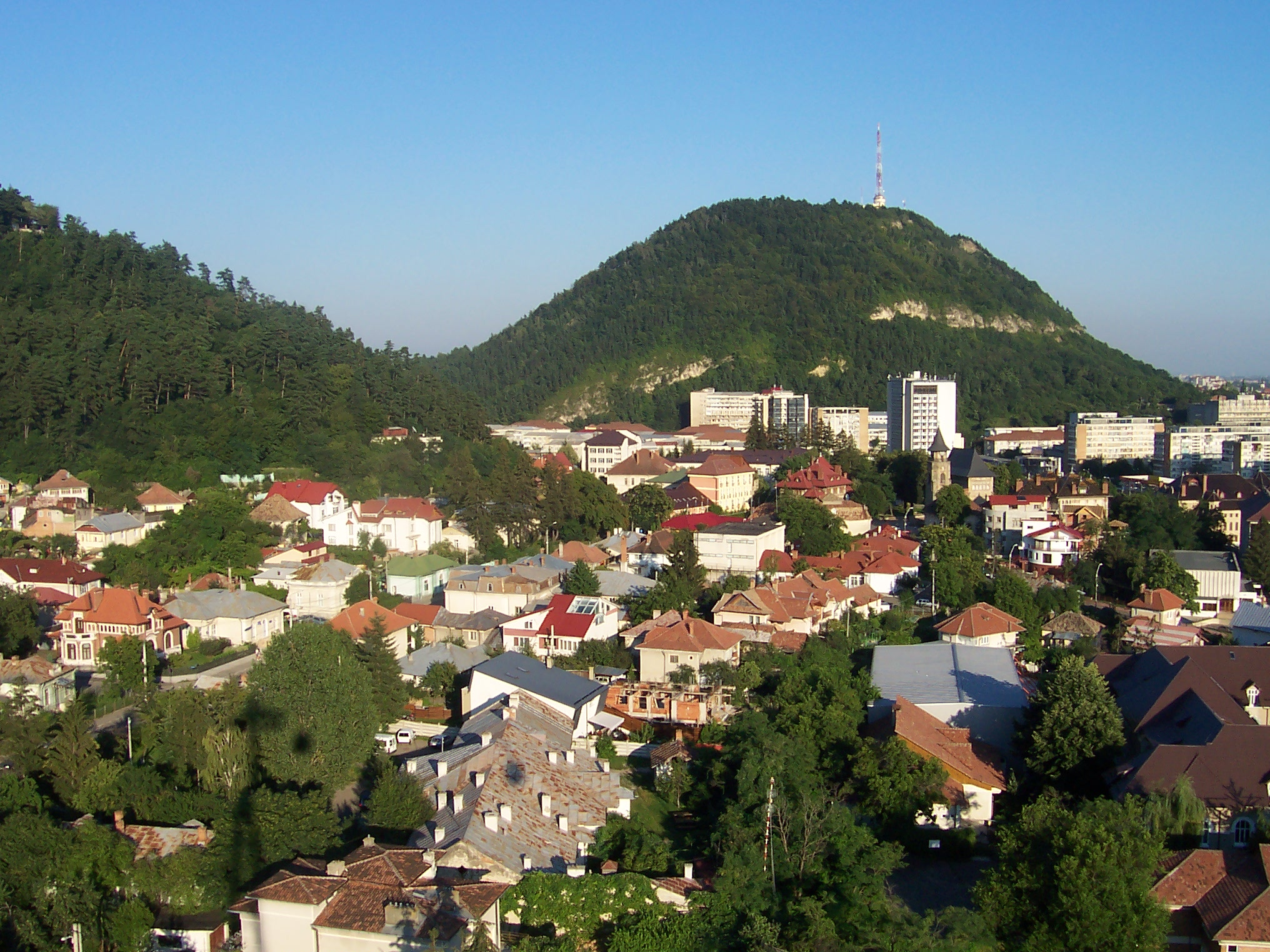
Piatra Neamț

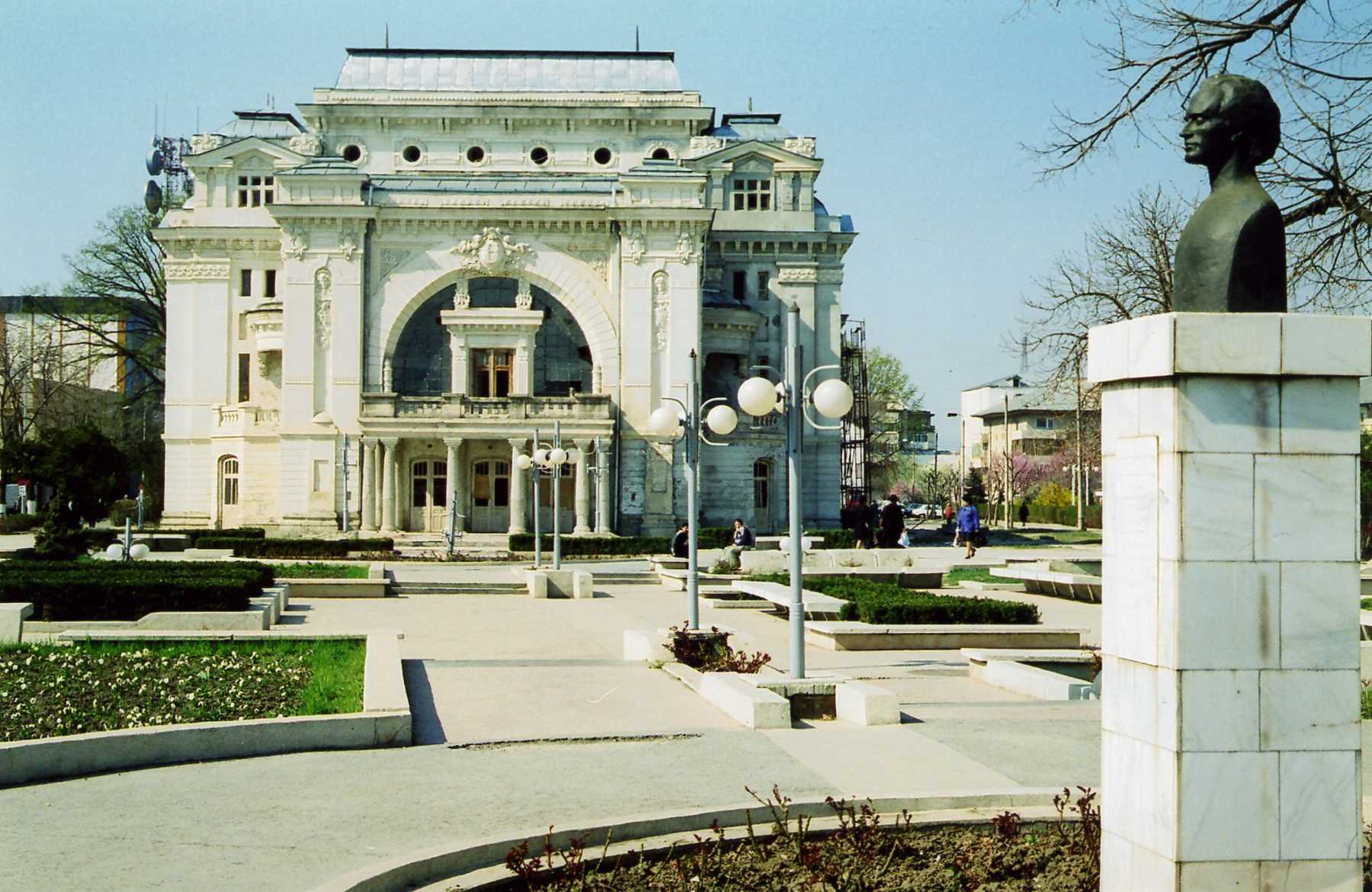
Focșani

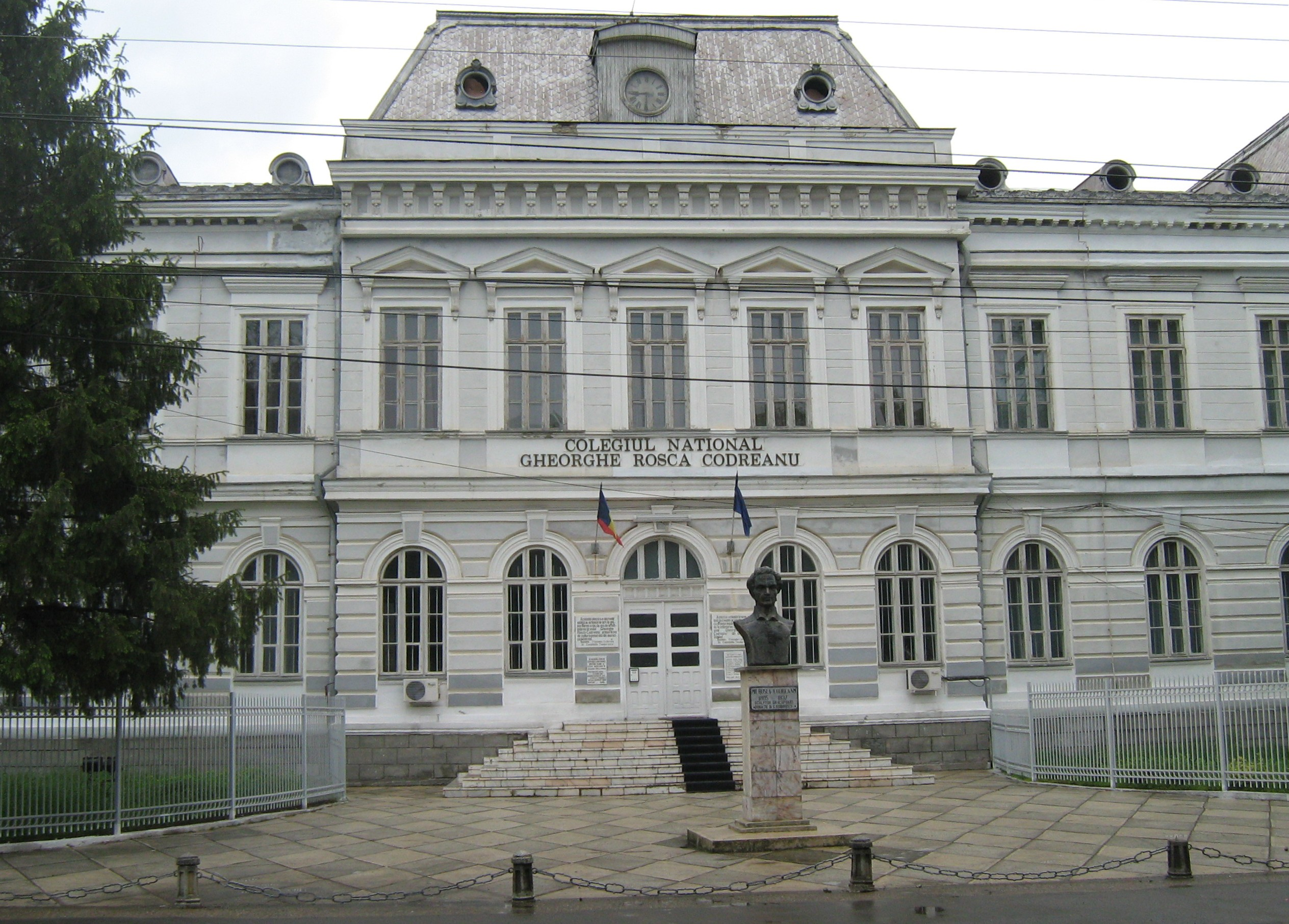
Bârlad

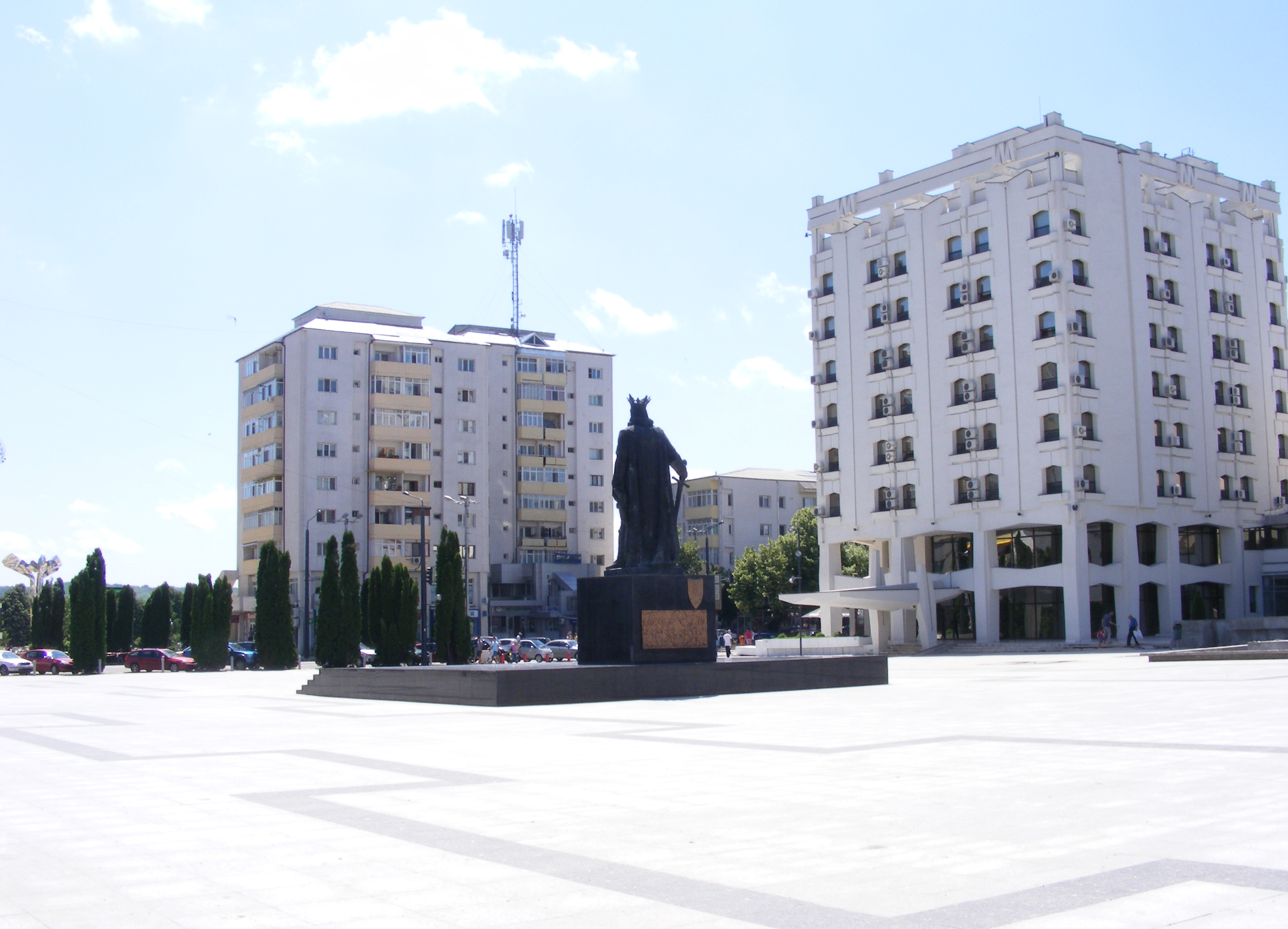
Vaslui

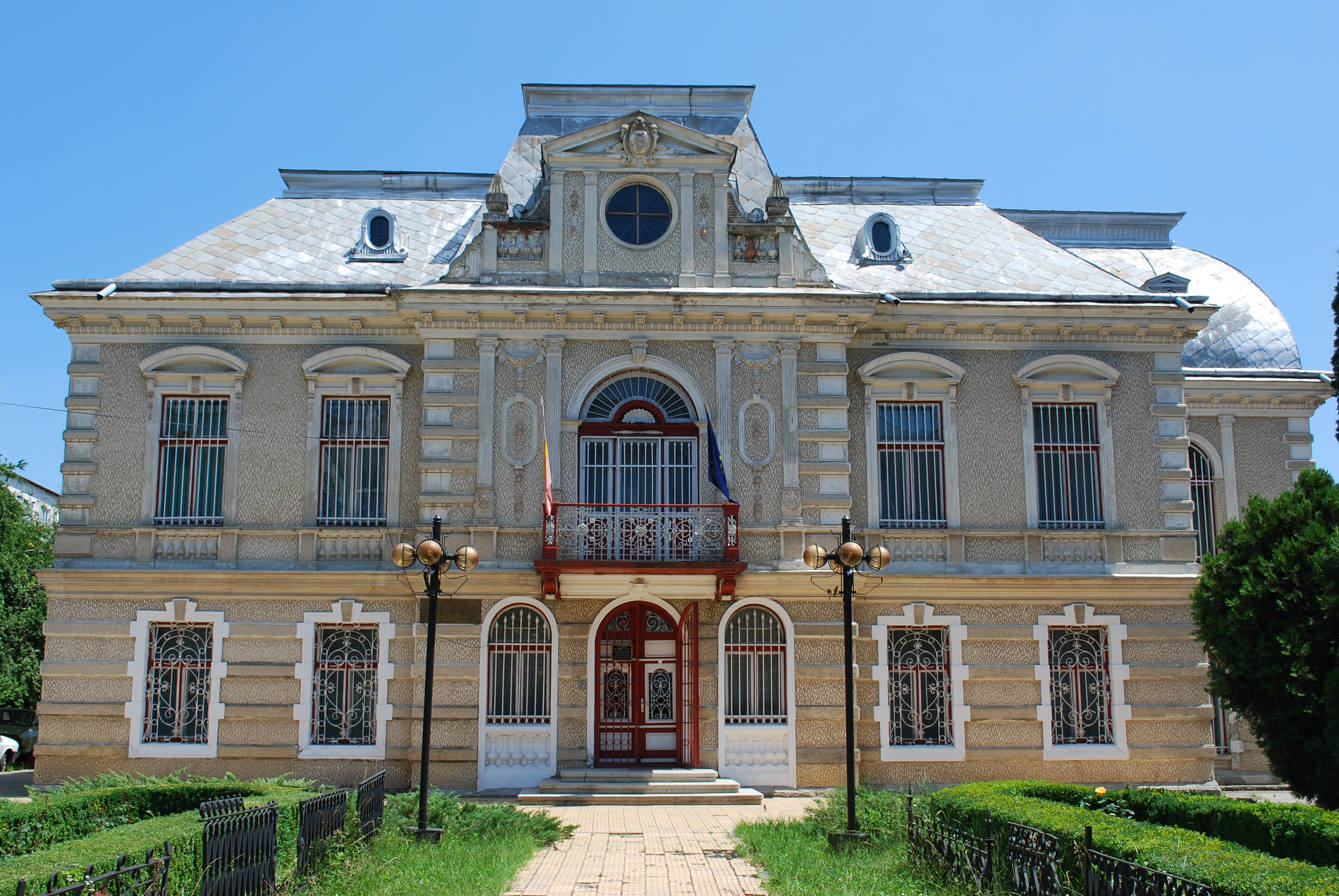
Roman

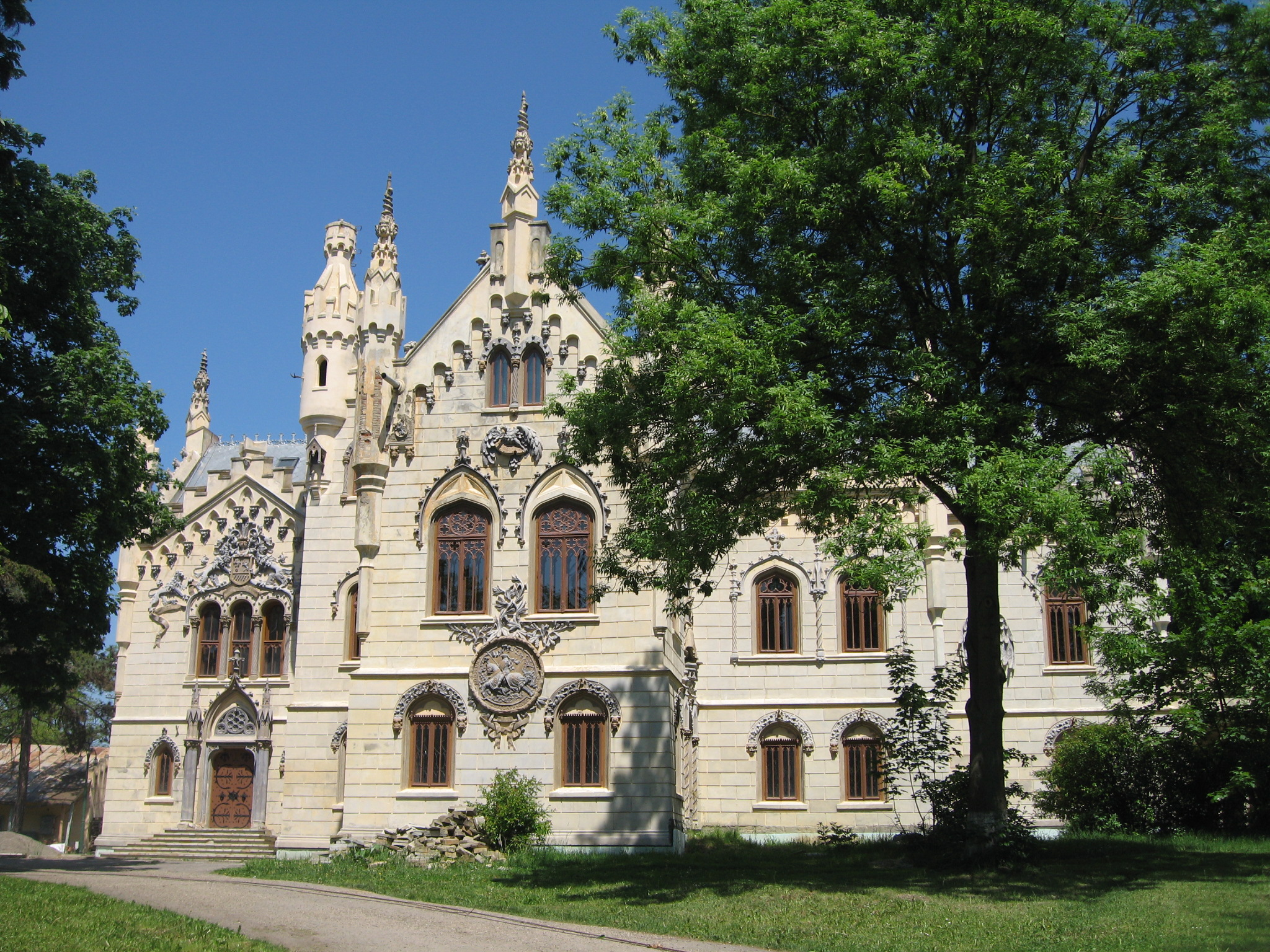
Miclăușeni

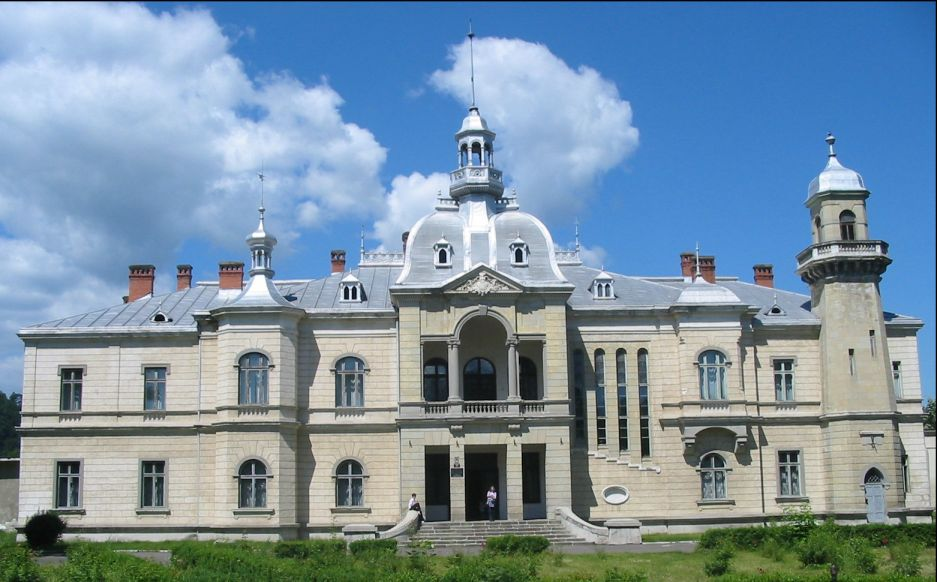
Comănești

== See also ==
- Principality of Moldavia
- Historical regions of Romania
- Moldavian Soviet Socialist Republic
