= Dumitru Ivanov (rower) =

Romanian rower

Personal information
- Nationality: Romanian
- Born: 6 November 1946 (age 80) Climăuți, Romania

Sport
- Sport: Rowing

Dumitru Ivanov (born 6 November 1946) is a Romanian rower. He competed in the men's coxless four event at the 1968 Summer Olympics.
