= Rowing at the 1964 Summer Olympics – Men's coxless four =

Men's coxless four at the Games of the XVIII Olympiad
- Venue: Toda Rowing Course
- Date: 11–15 October 1964
- Competitors: 56 from 14 nations
- Teams: 14
- Winning time: 6:59.30

Medalists
1st place, gold medalist(s)		John Hansen; Bjørn Hasløv; Erik Petersen; Kurt Helmudt	Denmark
2nd place, silver medalist(s)		John Russell; Hugh Wardell-Yerburgh; William Barry; John James	Great Britain
3rd place, bronze medalist(s)		Geoffrey Picard; Dick Lyon; Ted Mittet; Ted Nash	United States

The coxless four event was a rowing event conducted as part of the Rowing at the 1964 Summer Olympics programme.

== Medallists ==
Gold	Silver	Bronze
Denmark; John Hansen; Bjørn Hasløv; Erik Petersen; Kurt Helmudt	Great Britain; John Russell; Hugh Wardell-Yerburgh; William Barry; John James	United States; Geoffrey Picard; Dick Lyon; Ted Mittet; Ted Nash

== Results ==
=== Heats ===
The top crew in each heat advanced to the final, with all others sent to the repechages.

Heat 1
1.	Denmark, John Ørsted Hansen, Erik Petersen, Kurt Helmudt and Bjørn Borgen Hasløv	6:51.78	QF
2.	Romania, Ştefan Pongratz, Ludovic Covaci-Borbely, Carol Vereş and Nichifor Tarara	6:57.35	QR
3.	Canada, Daryl MacDonald, Robert Brookson, Neil Campbell and Chris Leach	7:01.97	QR
4.	Australia, Richard Garrard, Peter Gillon, Simon Newcomb and Anthony Walker	7:03.40	QR
5.	Japan, Shunsuke Miki, Koju Tsukamoto, Yasuji Honma and Bunzo Kimura	7:24.35	QR
Heat 2
1.	Great Britain, John M. Russell, Hugh Wardell-Yerburgh, William Barry and John James	6:47.04	QF
2.	United States, Geoffrey Picard, Dick Lyon, Ted Nash, Ted Mittet and Phil Durbrow	6:56.40	QR
3.	Netherlands, Sjoerd Wartena, Jim Enters, Herman Boelen and Sipke Castelein	7:01.51	QR
4.	Argentina, Juan Francisco Zanassi, Atilio Ensunza, Jorge Meana and Juan Alberto Iannuzzi	7:08.60	QR
5.	Italy, Romano Sgheiz, Fulvio Balatti, Giovanni Zucchi and Luciano Sgheiz	7:11.65	QR
Heat 3
1.	United Team of Germany, Günter Schrörs, Horst Effertz, Albrecht Müller and Manfred Misselhorn	6:37.83	QF
2.	Soviet Union, Celestinas Jucys, Eugenijus Levickas, Jonas Motiejūnas and Anatoly Sass	6:40.12	QR
3.	France, Jean-Pierre Drivet, Roger Chatelain, Philippe Malivoire and Émile Clerc	6:45.95	QR
4.	Austria, Dieter Ebner, Horst Kuttelwascher, Dieter Losert and Manfred Krausbar	6:48.18	QR

==== Repechages ====
The top finisher in each of the three repechages joined the finalists. The second and third place finishers competed in a consolation final for 7th-12th places. All other crews were eliminated.

Repechage 1
1.	United States	6:38.93	QF
2.	France	6:42.85	QC
3.	Japan	7:00.29	QC
4.	Australia	7:01.07
Repechage 2
1.	Italy	6:34.61	QF
2.	Soviet Union	6:37.86	QC
3.	Canada	6:53.38	QC
4.	Argentina	7:07.83
Repechage 3
1.	Netherlands	6:29.42	QF
2.	Romania	6:30.37	QC
3.	Austria	7:25.83	QC

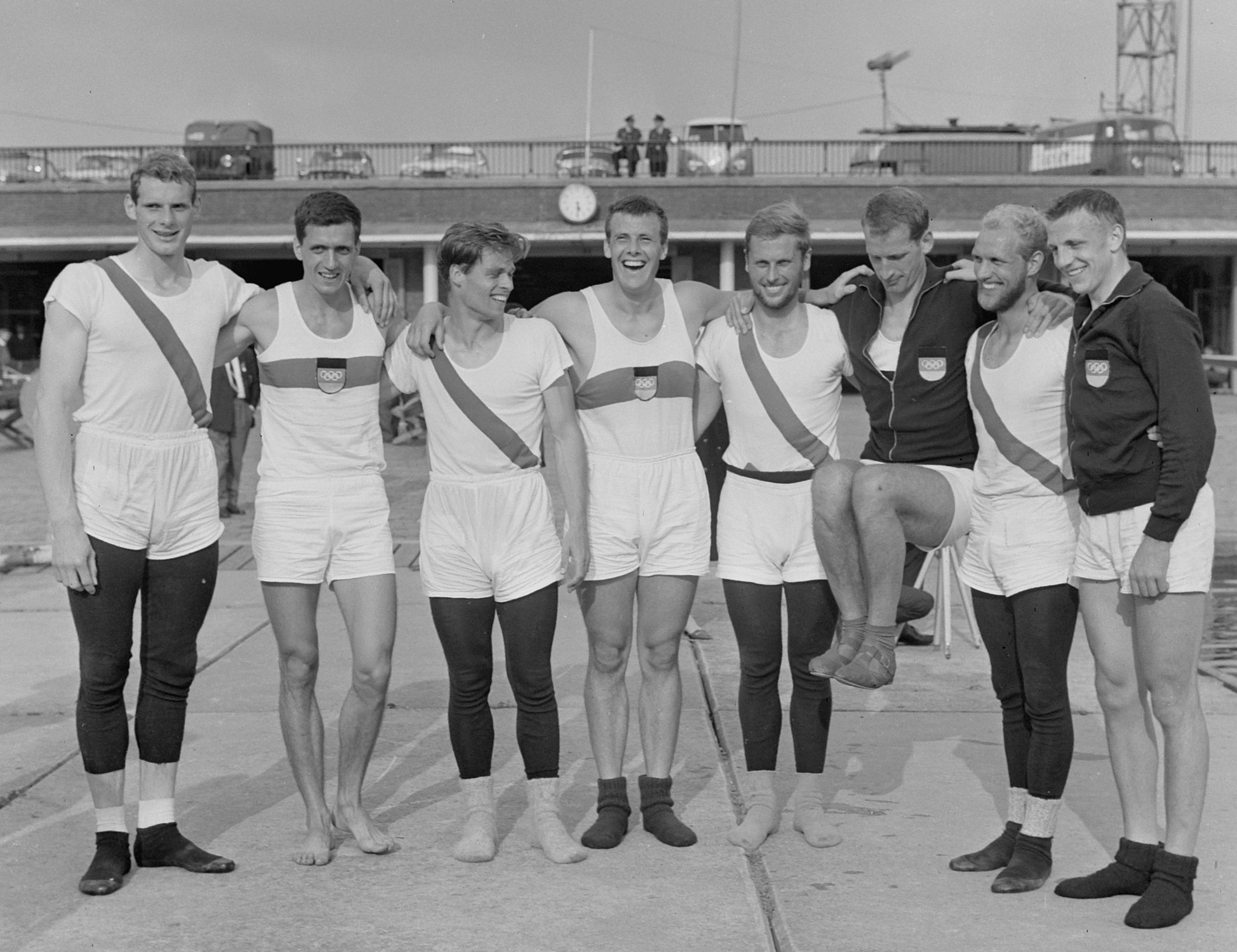
the danish and german coxless fours in Tokio

=== Consolation final ===
The consolation final determined places from 7th to 12th.

7.	Soviet Union	6:22.03
8.	Austria	6:24.15
9.	Romania	6:27.28
10.	France	6:38.32
11.	Canada	6:45.50
12.	Japan	6:51.60

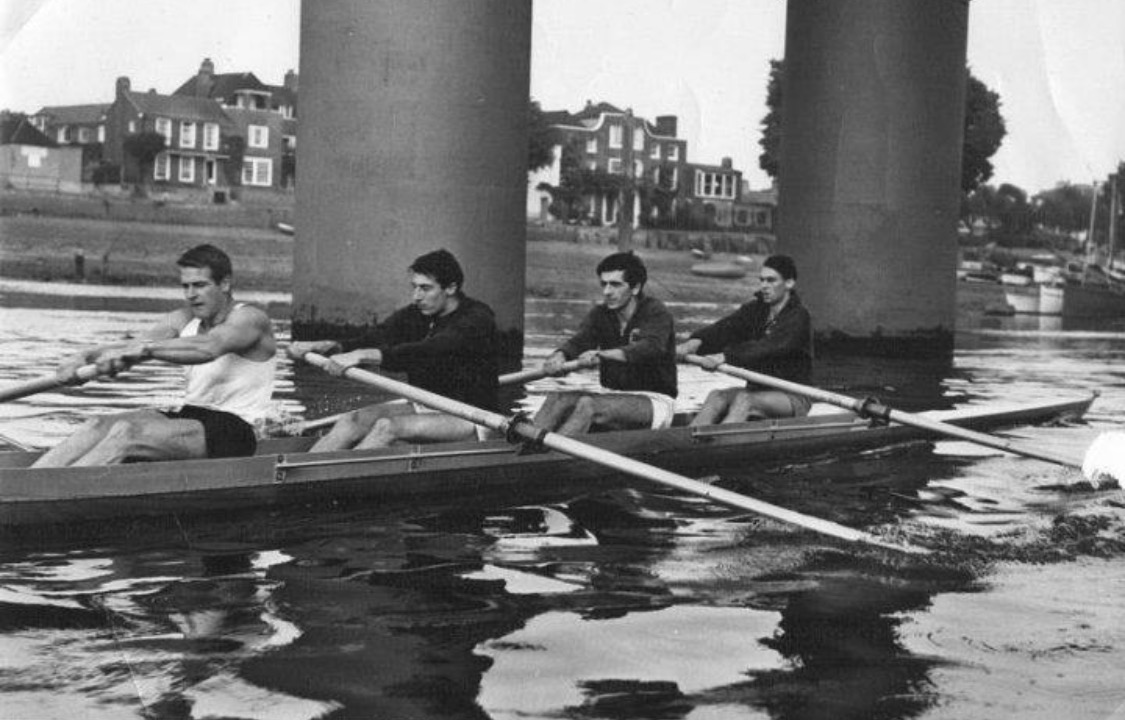
the british coxless four in training

=== Final ===
	Denmark	6:59.30
	Great Britain	7:00.47
	United States	7:01.37
4.	Netherlands	7:09.98
5.	Italy	7:10.05
6.	United Team of Germany	7:10.33

== Sources ==
- Tokyo Organizing Committee (1964). The Games of the XVIII Olympiad: Tokyo 1964, vol. 2.
