= West University of Timișoara =

Romanian university

- Universitatea de Vest din Timișoara
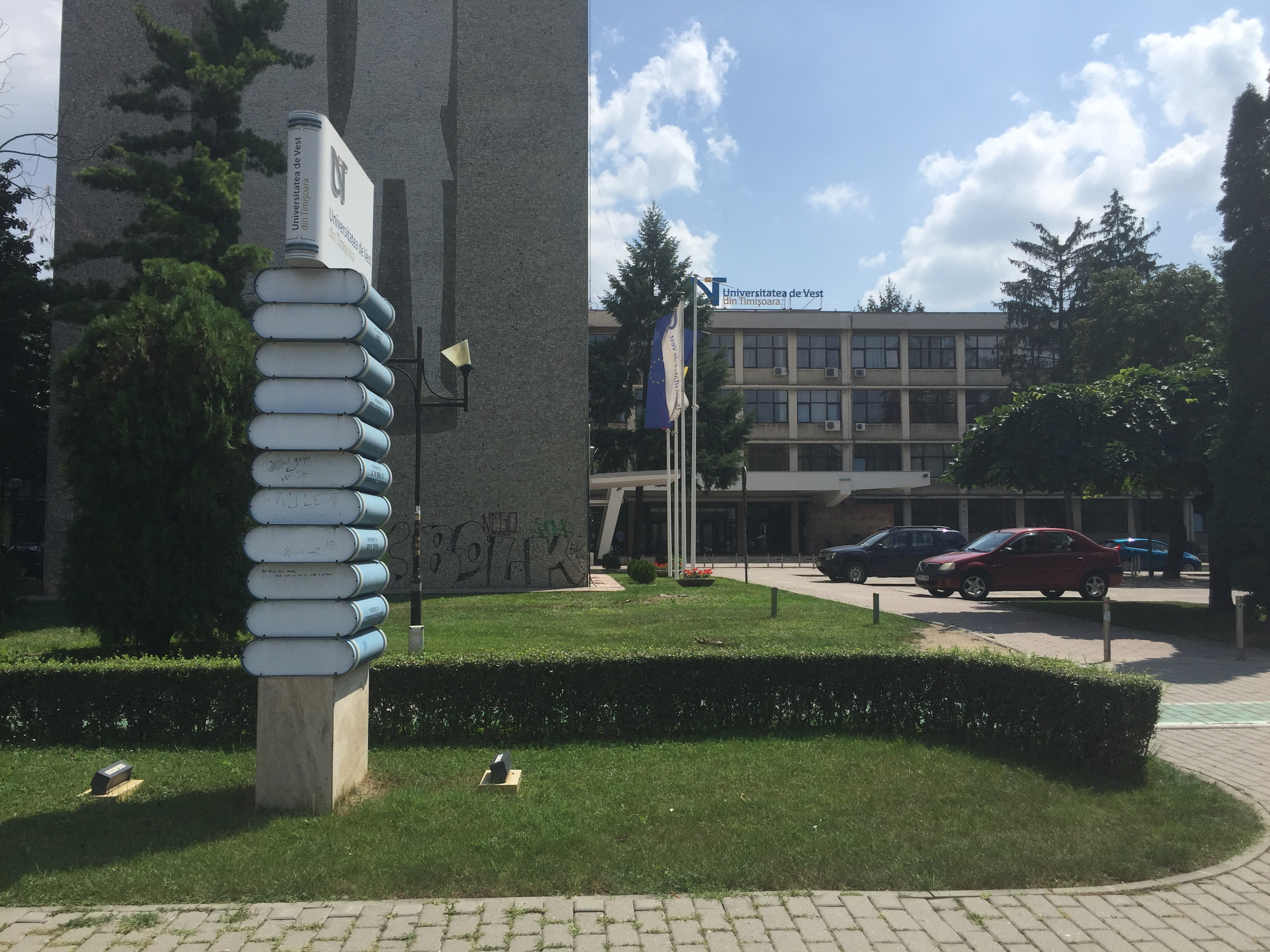
- Former names: Pedagogical Institute (1948–1962); University of Timișoara (1962–1994)
- Motto: Become your best!
- Type: Public
- Established: 30 December 1944; 81 years ago
- Academic affiliations: Agence universitaire de la Francophonie (AUF); European University Association (EUA); International Association of Universities (IAU)
- Rector: Marilen Pirtea
- Academic staff: 888 (2018)
- Undergraduates: 10,736 (2019)
- Postgraduates: 3,493 (2019)
- Doctoral students: 575 (2019)
- Location: 4 Vasile Pârvan Boulevard, Timișoara, Romania; 45°44′49″N 21°13′52″E
- Campus: Urban
- Colors: Yellow and blue
- Website: uvt.ro
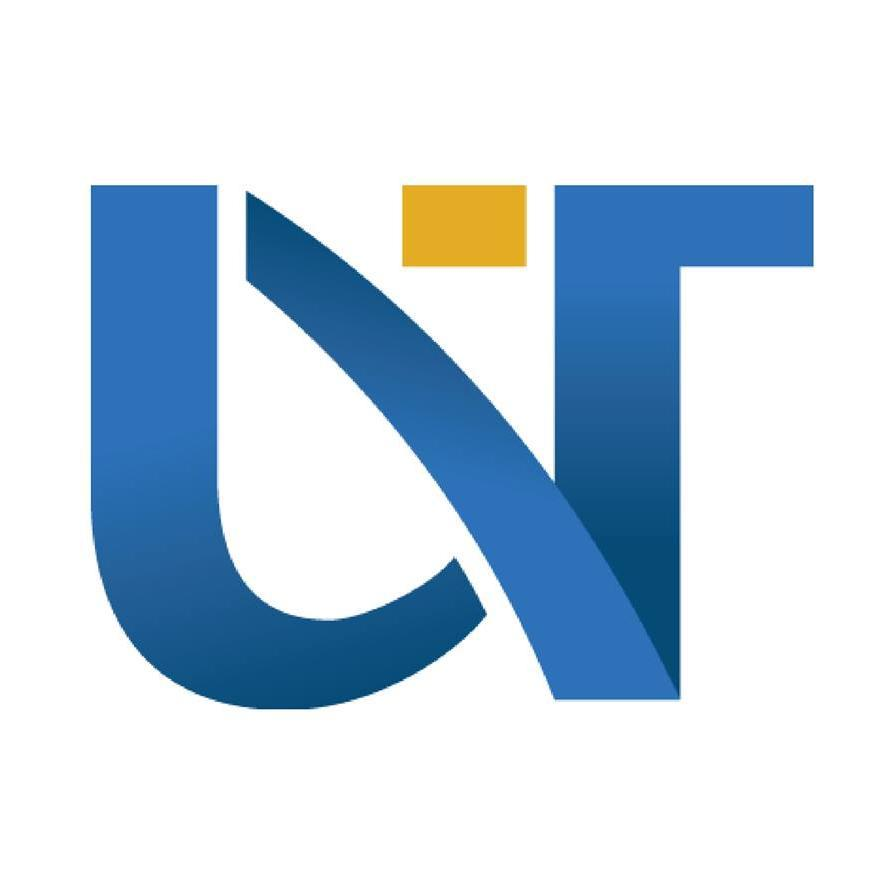

University rankings

Global – Overall
- QS World: 1201–1400 (2024)
- THE World: 1201–1500 (2024)
- USNWR Global: =889 (2023)

The West University of Timișoara (Romanian: Universitatea de Vest din Timișoara; abbreviated UVT) is a public higher education institution located in Timișoara. Classified by the Ministry of National Education as a university of education and scientific research, UVT is one of the nine members of the Universitaria Consortium (the group of Romanian elite universities). Also, the West University is a component institution of the National Research–Development–Innovation System in its capacity as an accredited higher education institution.

The university was founded by the Decree-Law no. 660 issued on 30 December 1944, which stipulates that a university must be created in western Romania. Its first faculties either were dissolved or became independent institutions. These independent higher education institutions became a sole university at the end of September 1962. In 1968 the institution became an independent university. A difficult period followed, especially for the humanities and the exact sciences. Fields of study such as music, fine arts, history, geography, natural sciences and chemistry have all but disappeared, while philology has greatly restricted its activity. As a result, many of the faculties were transferred to other institutions. 1989, the year of the Romanian Revolution, was a turning point in the evolution of the university. It led to the present-day conditions. An essential mentality change took place in the perception of the academic institution, in accordance with the democratic institutions in Western Europe. A substantial institutional reform was carried out, beginning with the redefining of the university's mission by establishing its objectives.

The West University of Timișsoara comprises 11 faculties with the respective departments, as well as a teacher training department. The faculties that operate within UVT offer nationally accredited study programs at bachelor's, master's and doctoral level in the following fields: Arts and Design; Chemistry, Biology, Geography; Economics and Business Administration; Law; Letters, History and Theology; Mathematics and Computer Science; Music and Theater; Physical Education and Sports; Physics; Political Sciences, Philosophy and Communication Sciences; Sociology and Psychology.

== History ==
=== 30 December 1944: Decree-Law no. 660 ===
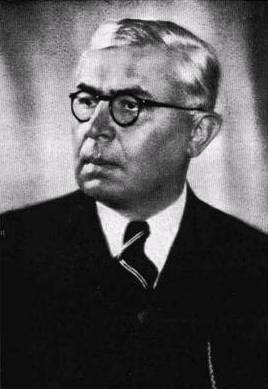
Sever Bocu, first head of the Ephoria (board) of the West University

The establishment of the West University of Timișoara was a complex and long process. It was done in stages, in an internal and international political, social and economic context marked by World War II and the territorial resettlements caused by the loss of Bessarabia, Northern Bukovina and Hertsa region (in the north), as well as Southern Dobruja (in the south). 1940 brings major changes in the academic life of Timișoara. After the Second Vienna Award, which saw Northern Transylvania ceded to Hungary, the faculties of Agronomy, Theology and Sciences from Cluj relocated to Timișoara. Notable for the establishment of the future West University are the insistent and mobilizing approaches of the politician and culture man Sever Bocu who, through his humanistic and cultural policy ideas, exerted a strong influence in the Romanian society in Banat, between 1920 and 1945. Although the Faculty of Sciences returned after 1945 in Cluj, a good part of the academics from Cluj remained in Timișoara, such as Coriolan Drăgulescu, Mihail Ghermănescu, Gheorghe Th. Gheorghiu, Emilian Arghiriade, Ioan Curea, Gheorghe Silaș, Maria Neumann, Gheorghe Ostrogovich, Alexandru Cișmaș, Constantin Sălceanu and others, who were at the forefront of those who campaigned for the establishment of the West University, as the fourth university of the country.

The West University was formally established by Decree-Law no. 660 of 30 December 1944, promulgated by King Michael I. This act provided for the newly established institute to operate starting with the academic year 1944/1945 with the following specializations: Law, Letters and Philosophy, Sciences, Human Medicine, Veterinary Medicine, Pharmacy and Theology. The transposition of the Decree into reality has provoked contradictory discussions and tensions caused by vainglory and rivalry both locally and regionally; six of the seven faculties of the future West University were claimed by other cities (Arad, Lugoj, Caransebeș), there was the intention of some local ethnic groups to impose a bilingual organization of university education, which endangered the creation and operation of a university with a unitary organizational structure in Timișoara.

The dissensions within the Ephoria of the West University, the increasingly hostile actions of the communist authorities, imposed by the Soviet occupiers, led to the annulment, in essence, of the provisions of the Royal Decree for the establishment of the country's fourth university. In 1945, the government of Petru Groza decreed that the West University would first be a Faculty of Medicine. Obstacles have multiplied. Local and government funding sources were insufficient and, in addition, their management was blamed. Sever Bocu is fired from Ephoria's leadership, which will eventually be dissolved.

=== 1948–1962: Pedagogical Institute ===
In the following years, under the pressure of the process of Sovietization of Romania, through the forced transposition of the Soviet economic and cultural models in the USSR, the reorganization of higher education took place. Based on the Decree no. 175 of 3 August 1948 and the Decision no. 263327 of 25 October 1948 regarding the organization of the Romanian higher education, in Timișoara the three-year Pedagogical Institute with the Faculty of Mathematics and Physics was established, having the mission to prepare teachers for grades VIII–XI. The courses of the Pedagogical Institute began on 19 January 1949, in a modest space, with 82 students.

In the academic year 1952/1953, the duration of studies at the Faculty of Mathematics and Physics was set at four years. An evening section also starts operating within the Pedagogical Institute. The academic year 1956/1957 marks a new and important stage in the development of the Institute. The Faculty of Philology was inaugurated, with a duration of studies of five years, distance learning was introduced at the Faculty of Mathematics and Physics, and from the following year, the duration of studies at this faculty becomes five years. A new group of young teachers with great potential arrives in Timisoara, submitting a memorandum to the ministry, requesting its transformation into a university, the separation of departments into distinct faculties and the elaboration by graduates of a diploma thesis. In 1957, the director of the Institute became rector, and the new institution was configured as an educational and cultural center worthy of consideration.

=== 1962–1994: University of Timișoara ===
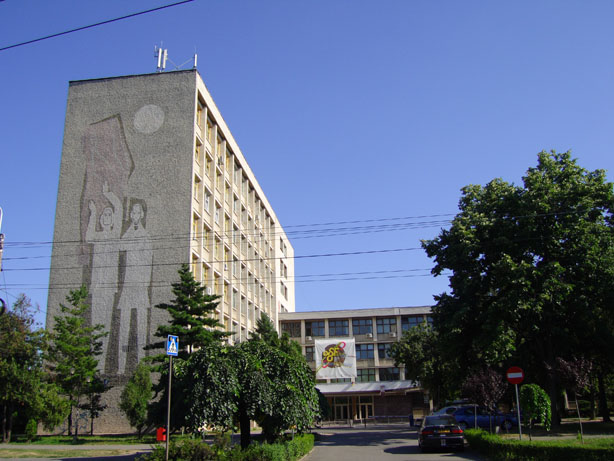
The main building on Vasile Pârvan Boulevard was completed in 1964 after a project by architect Hans Fackelmann. The mosaic on its facade, which depicts Mihai Eminescu and Nicolae Bălcescu, was made by portraitist and muralist Ștefan Szönyi.

By the Decision of the Council of Ministers no. 999 of 27 September 1962, the memorandum submitted in 1956, which establishes the new organization status and the name of the University of Timișoara, is accepted. In the same year, the works start at the new university building, on Vasile Pârvan Boulevard, under the coordination of the architect Hans Fackelmann. His project was awarded by the State Committee for Construction, Architecture and Systematization (CSCAS) in 1964 and by the Union of Architects in Romania (UAR) in 1967.

In 1967/1968, the newly established Faculty of Economics was added, then the faculties of the three-year Pedagogical Institute. After a period of hybrid operation with specializations with study cycles of three, four and five years (1962–1967), the integration into a unitary university structure is completed. In 1970 there were 12 faculties, with 20 specializations. During the years 1962–1989, the evolution of the university was conditioned, under the strict control of the activities in the Romanian education, of the educational act and of professional training, by ministerial orders and decisions marked ideologically. The inconsistency of the program, with its alleged orientation towards modernization, has led to uncertainty and instability in university structures and activities. Faculties, sections, specializations, departments, disciplines were established and abolished, most often without any good motivation. By 1989, in the University of Timișoara there were only three profiles. The humanist profile, inextricably linked to the concept imagined by the interwar intellectuals, as fundamental to the West University, had become almost non-existent.

After the 1989 Revolution, the reorganization of the university and the democratization of education have raised issues of great importance to the new leadership of the faculties and the university. Tensions, turmoil and efforts to change also took place at the University of Timișoara. From the first days following the abolition of the totalitarian regime, the teachers dismissed the last leadership established by the Communist Party and replaced the rector appointed in October 1989. The philologist Eugen Todoran thus became the first rector of the university in the post-communist period. The academic year 1990/1991 opens in a modified framework, with new specializations and faculties: Fine Arts and Design, Physical Education and Sports, Chemistry, Geography, Biology, Psychology and Sociology, Law, Music and Theater Arts, the duration of schooling being established at five years.

=== 1994–present: West University of Timișoara ===
On the occasion of the 50th anniversary of the establishment of the West University by Decree-Law no. 600/1944, the Ministry of Education, at the request of the teachers, decides that the name of the institution should be the West University of Timișoara. At the end of the 1995/1996 academic year, the West University of Timișoara had eight faculties, a Department for Teaching Staff Development, 40 long-term specializations, a short-term specialization (three years, Information Technology), 12 master's and in-depth studies specializations, a program of European Higher Education.

The 2000s were one of the most dynamic periods in the history of the university, characterized by a very large number of students, constant concerns for improving infrastructure, by building new buildings. The youngest of the university's faculties, the Faculty of Political Sciences, Philosophy and Communication Sciences, was founded in 2004. Since 2012 UVT is a member of the strongest university consortium in Romania, the Universitaria Consortium, a joint project of five of the most prestigious universities in the country (University of Bucharest, Babeș-Bolyai University of Cluj-Napoca, Alexandru Ioan Cuza University of Iași and the Academy of Economic Studies of Bucharest).

== Administration ==
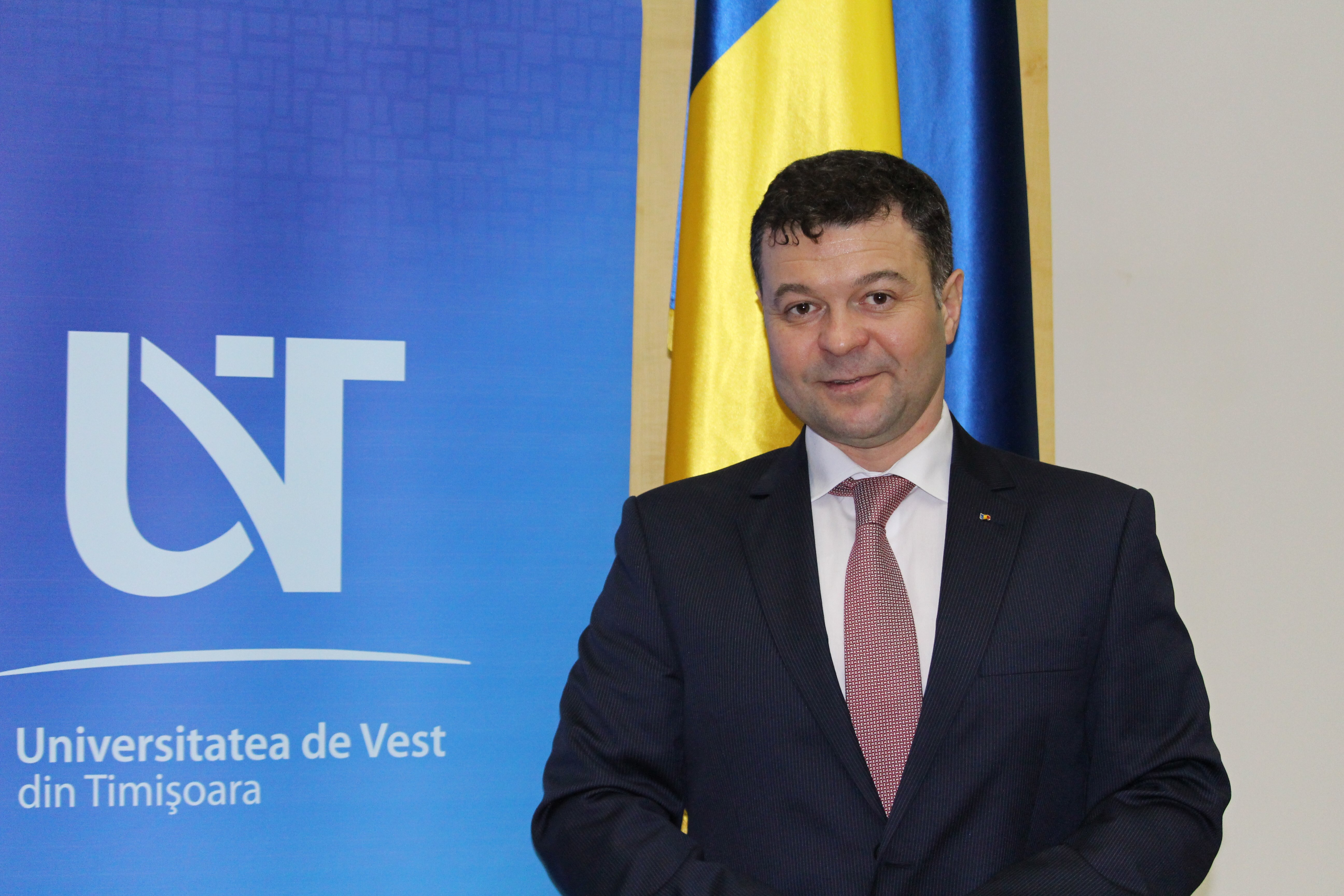
Marilen Pirtea, rector of the West University

The UVT Board of Directors ensures, under the leadership of the UVT Rector, the operative management of the university and implements the decisions of the UVT Senate. The Board of Directors consists of the rector, vice-rectors, deans, the general administrative director and a student representative, appointed by OSUT. The position of rector of the university has been held since 2012 by Marilen Pirtea, former dean of the Faculty of Economics and Business Administration.

Name	Term
Eugen Todoran (1918–1997) philologist and literary historian	1992–1996
Dumitru Gașpar mathematician	1996–2000
Ioan Mihai (d. 2012)	2000–2008
Ioan Talpoș (b. 1949) economist	2008–2012
Marilen Pirtea (b. 1973) economist and politician	2012–present

== Faculties ==
Faculty	Location	Dean	Established	Specializations		Students (2018/2019)
Faculty	Location	Dean	Established	Undergraduate	Postgraduate	Students (2018/2019)
Arts and Design arte.uvt.ro	4 Oituz Street	Camil Mihăescu	1960	6: Conservation and restoration; Decorative arts; Design; Fashion; Painting, graphics, sculpture; Photography	8: Advertising and book graphics; Fashion design; Graphic design; Heritage, restoration and curation in visual arts; Image sources and resources; Interior and product design; Photo and video making; Sculpture and ceramics	731
Chemistry, Biology, Geography cbg.uvt.ro	16A Johann Heinrich Pestalozzi Street	Nicoleta Ianovici	1992	8: Biochemistry; Biology; Cartography; Chemistry; Geography; Geography of tourism; Medical chemistry; Territorial planning	6: Clinical and sanitary laboratory chemistry; Developmental biology; Forensic chemistry; Geographic information systems (English); Territorial planning and sustainable development; Tourism development and planning	815
Economics and Business Administration feaa.uvt.ro	16 Johann Heinrich Pestalozzi Street	Petru Ștefea	1967	11: Accounting and management information systems (Romanian); Accounting and management information systems (German); Commerce, tourism and service economy; Economic informatics; Economics and international affairs; Finance and banking (Romanian); Finance and banking (English); General economics and economic communication; Management (Romanian); Management (French); Marketing	22: Accounting and financial audit; Accounting expertise and business evaluation; Advertising and sales promotion; Audit and financial management of European funds; Business administration in tourism and hospitality industry; Business diagnosis, evaluation and consultancy; Business information systems; Business management in a European context (French); Business space development; European studies and economics of European integration; Finance and financial strategies of companies; Financial markets, banks and insurance; Fiscality and fiscal consultancy; Global entrepreneurship, economics and management (English); Human resources management; International corporate finance (English); Management and European integration; Management of business organizations (Romanian); Management of business organizations (English); Marketing and sales management; Strategic management of organizations; Strategic marketing and digital marketing	4,056
Law drept.uvt.ro	9A Tisa Heroes' Boulevard	Lucian Bercea	1992	1: Law	6: Administrative and fiscal litigation; Business law; Criminal sciences; European Union law; Judicial career; Tax law	1,320
Letters, History and Theology litere.uvt.ro	4 Vasile Pârvan Boulevard	Loredana Pungă	1956	10: Classical philology; English language and literature; French language and literature; German language and literature; History; Modern applied languages; Orthodox theology; Romanian language and literature; Russian language and literature; Serbian language and literature	8: American studies; Archeology and environment in the context of sustainable development; Current trends in the study of the Romanian language; German in a European context; Literature and culture – Romanian contexts, European contexts; Religion, culture, society; Romance cultural and linguistic studies; Translation theory and practice (English and French)	1,577
Mathematics and Computer Science math.uvt.ro	4 Vasile Pârvan Boulevard	Dana Petcu	1948	5: Applied computer science; Computational mathematics; Computer science (Romanian); Computer science (English); Mathematics	8: Analytical and geometric modeling of systems; Artificial intelligence and distributed computing (Romanian); Artificial intelligence and distributed computing (English); Big data (English); Bioinformatics; Cyber security; Financial mathematics; Software engineering	1,593
Music and Theater fmt.uvt.ro	1 Liberty Square	Violeta Zonte	1961	5: Acting (Romanian); Acting (German); Canto; Instruments; Music	2: Performing arts; Stylistics of musical interpretation	376
Physical Education and Sports sport.uvt.ro	4 Vasile Pârvan Boulevard	Adrian Nagel	1960	3: Kinetotheraphy and special motricity; Physical and sports education; Sports and motric performance	5: Fitness and motric performance; Kinetoprophylaxis and physical recovery; Kinetotherapy in orthopedic-traumatic pathology; Management of physical education and sports activities and organizations; Physical and sports education	897
Physics physics.uvt.ro	4 Vasile Pârvan Boulevard	Mihail Lungu	1948	3: Computational physics; Medical physics; Physics	3: Astrophysics, elementary particles and computational physics (English); Physics and technology of advanced materials (English); Physics applied in medicine	173
Political Sciences, Philosophy and Communication Sciences pfc.uvt.ro	4 Vasile Pârvan Boulevard	Alexandru Jădăneanț	1999	9: Communication and public relations; Digital media; International relations and European studies (Romanian); International relations and European studies (German); Journalism; Philosophy; Political sciences; Public administration; Publicity	6: Communication and mediation in social conflicts; Global security studies; International development and management of global affairs (English); Mass media and public relations; Philosophical counseling and consultancy (English); Public policies and advocacy	1,082
Sociology and Psychology fsp.uvt.ro	4 Vasile Pârvan Boulevard	Irina Macsinga	1994	7: Human resources; Pedagogy; Pedagogy of primary and preschool education; Psychology; Social assistance; Sociology; Special psychopedagogy	9: Clinical psychology and psychotherapy; Educational counseling and integration; Educational management and curriculum development; Human resources management in the administration of organizations; Management and supervision in the well-being of the child and the family; Social assistance on social reintegration in the field of criminal justice; Social entrepreneurship and community development; Values-centered social assistance practice; Work psychology, organizational and transport psychology	2,184

== Students ==
Number of students by faculty (2018/2019)
1. Economics and Business Administration (27.4%)
2. Sociology and Psychology (14.8%)
3. Mathematics and Computer Science (10.8%)
4. Letters, History and Theology (10.7%)
5. Law (8.92%)
6. Political Sciences, Philosophy and Communication Sciences (7.31%)
7. Physical Education and Sports (6.06%)
8. Chemistry, Biology, Geography (5.51%)
9. Arts and Design (4.94%)
10. Music and Theater (2.54%)
11. Physics (1.17%)

As of 2018, 14,804 students are enrolled in the West University. Between 2008 and 2018, the total number of students decreased by more than 9,000, from almost 24,000 to less than 15,000. Among the causes that led to this decrease are the poor performance of high school students in the baccalaurate exam and the cut in the number of paid places.

2% of students are foreigners. In 2017, 236 foreign students were enrolled in the West University, most of them from Israel, Tunisia, Iraq, Syria, Algeria and Italy. Also, in 2017, 496 Romanian students from abroad were enrolled, most of them from Serbia and Moldova.

Academic year	Undergraduates	Postgraduates	Doctoral students	Total
2008/2009	16,886	6,057	988	23,931
2009/2010	14,180	6,378	936	21,494
2010/2011	13,348	5,405	801	19,554
2011/2012	11,761	4,799	773	17,333
2012/2013	11,043	4,491	512	16,046
2013/2014	10,324	4,033	460	14,817
2014/2015	10,016	3,679	464	14,159
2015/2016	9,828	3,434	543	13,805
2016/2017	10,094	3,270	559	13,923
2017/2018	10,151	3,148	508	13,807
2018/2019	10,736	3,493	575	14,804

=== Student organizations ===
The Organization of Students of the West University of Timișoara (OSUT) is the only union-student organization established at the level of the West University of Timișoara, founded on 27 March 1990, which makes it the most representative organization of the university. It deals with student representation, providing basic services for them and organizing projects. OSUT is a full member of the National Alliance of Student Organizations in Romania (ANOSR) and often active in the European Students' Union (ESU).

Other organizations that operate within the university are:

- Association internationale des étudiants en sciences économiques et commerciales (AIESEC)
- Association for Romanians Abroad Inițiativa
- Exact Science Students' Association from the University of Timișoara (ASSEUT)
- Timișoara Psychology and Sociology Students Association (ASPST)
- European Law Students' Association (ELSA)
- Erasmus Student Network (ESN)
- Timișoara Geography Students Association (GEOTIM)
- Bessarabian Students' Organization from Timișoara (OSB)
- Young Accountants Association (YAA)

== Affiliations and international relations ==
The Department of International Relations (DRI) is responsible for the UVT activities aimed at fulfilling the strategic internationalization objectives of the university. Within DRI operate the Erasmus+ Office, whose main task is to develop and implement mobility programs and international cooperation projects at UVT under Erasmus+ and EEA Financial Mechanism and the International Cooperation and Foreign Students Office, which provides institutional and informational support to international students and foreign teachers who wish to study and teach at UVT.

The West University of Timișoara is a member of the Agence universitaire de la Francophonie, the European University Association and the International Association of Universities, among others. UVT is also part of the Magna Charta Observatory, a nonprofit organization founded by the University of Bologna and the European University Association.

UVT has entered into collaboration agreements with 198 universities in 51 countries in Africa, Asia, Europe, North America and South America.

== Infrastructure ==
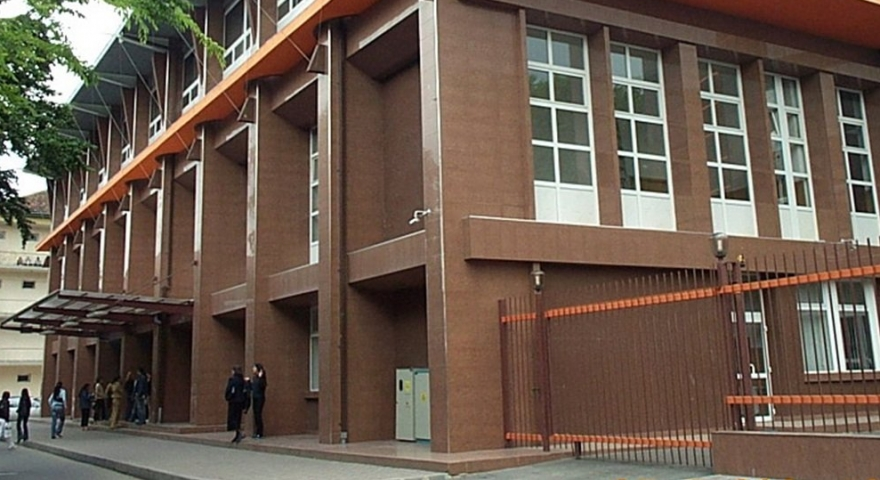
The building of the Faculty of Law on Tisa Heroes' Boulevard

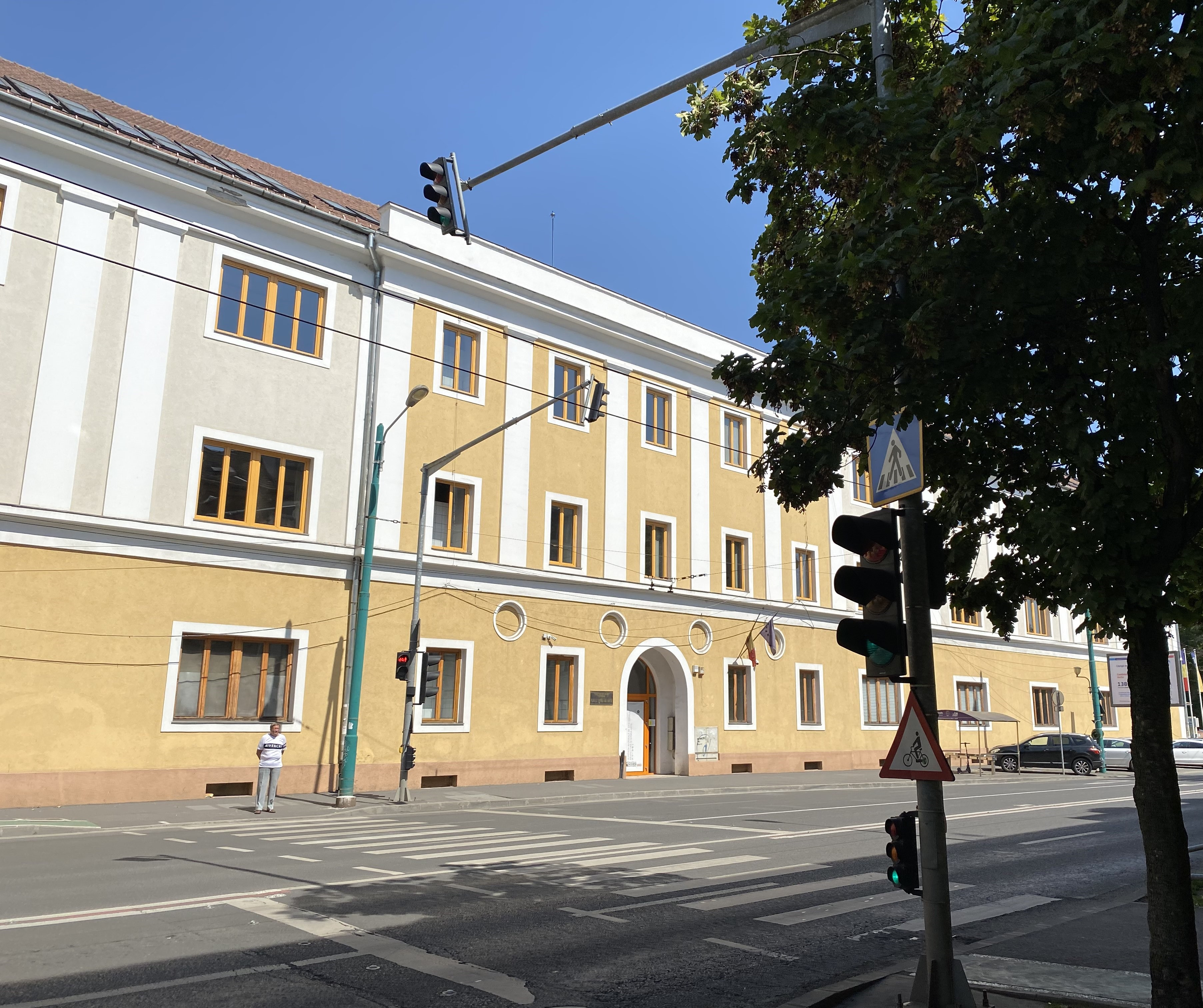
The Faculty of Arts and Design, hosted in the former Nandor (Ferdinand) Barracks

The West University of Timișoara has seven buildings:

- the main building of UVT, with an area of 26,319.1 m^{2}: 10 lecture halls and 46 rooms (of which 27 laboratories); added to this are the rooms of the building of the Faculty of Physics (a separate building attached to the main building) with a lecture hall, two classrooms and 25 laboratories;
- the building of the Faculty of Law, with an area of 3,006 m^{2}: four lecture halls, 15 lecture and seminar rooms and a conference room;
- the building of the Faculty of Arts and Design, with an area of 6,175 m^{2}: four lecture and seminar rooms and eight laboratories (studios);
- the building of the Faculty of Economics and Business Administration, with an area of 7,652 m^{2}: a lecture hall, 36 lecture and seminar rooms and six laboratories;
- the building of the Faculty of Chemistry, Biology, Geography, with an area of 4,255 m^{2}: five lecture and seminar rooms and eight laboratories;
- the building of the Faculty of Sociology and Psychology, with an area of 180 m^{2}: two lecture and seminar rooms;
- the building of the Department of Biology and Chemistry, with an area of 725 m^{2}: six laboratories where courses are also held.

Within the main building is the Aula Magna where national and international large-scale events can take place. The West University of Timișoara also has a computer center located within the Faculty of Physics.

=== Campus ===
UVT students are accommodated in the C3, C12, C13, C15, C16, C17 and G4 dormitories in Complexul Studențesc and in the Camelia, Drept and Renașterii dormitories spread in different locations in the city. As of 2018, UVT has a capacity of 3,005 accommodation places (out of the 13,000 in the whole complex). However, UVT can only cover 60% of applications.

=== Sports facilities ===
The West University has two sports halls: one on Vasile Pârvan Boulevard and another on Oituz Street. The first consists of a gym of 151.19 m^{2} and a sports hall of 538.56 m^{2}. The second was inaugurated in 2015 and covers 1,700 m^{2}. It has locker rooms for athletes and referees, fitness equipment, a doctor's office and 150 seats in the stands. In the Oituz area, UVT representatives intend to arrange several outdoor sports fields, as well as a swimming pool.

Also, in Vasile Pârvan Boulevard there is a handball field, with an area of 600 m^{2}, also used for minifootball and a basketball court with bitumen surface.

=== Eugen Todoran Central University Library ===
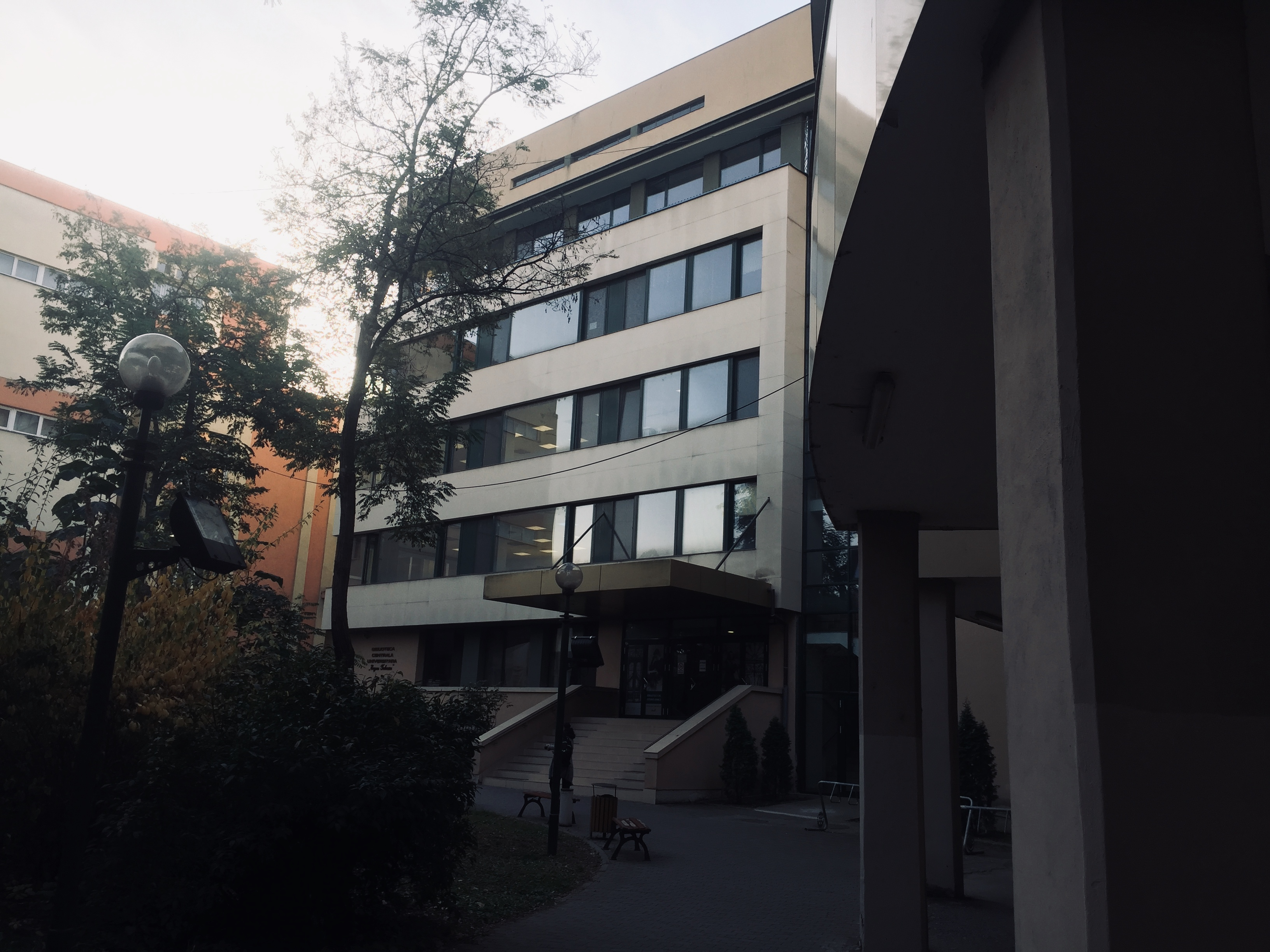
Eugen Todoran Central University Library

The library was established by Decree-Law no. 660 of 30 December 1944, issued by King Michael I and named after the Romanian philologist Eugen Todoran, who, as rector of the university, supported its transformation into an academic library. At first, the library's bookstock consisted mainly of mathematics and physics books and magazines. After the Faculty of Philology was founded in 1956, the library of the Pedagogical Institute acquired an encyclopedic profile and was continuously enriched. Since 1962, with the transformation of the Pedagogical Institute into a university, the Central Library of the University of Timișoara has developed rapidly. Since 1975, it has been entitled to a legal deposit. Since 1992, by Order of the Minister of Education no. 6237 of 14 September, the Library of the University of Timișoara became the Central University Library, an institution of national interest, with legal personality, similar to those in Bucharest, Cluj-Napoca and Iași.

The library operates in a central headquarters, at 4A Vasile Pârvan Boulevard, which consists of two buildings: A – the old building and B – the new building. Branch libraries are organized in the headquarters of some faculties of the West University. As of 2019, the library's bookstock consists of over 1.1 million volumes, and access to them is based on a reader's card issued by the library.

In addition, UVT has its own publishing house and printing house. Founded in 2001, the publishing house covers many fields of study and research: anthropology, ethnology, philology, philosophy, physics, mathematics, psychology, sociology, cultural studies, communication sciences, education sciences, economics, politics, theology, translation studies, etc. It is recognized by the National Council for Scientific Research in Higher Education (CNCSIS).

=== Planetarium ===
The planetarium was inaugurated on 1 January 1964, a first in Romania at that time. The construction of this planetarium, as well as the construction of the astronomical observatory (now property of the Romanian Academy), were possible due to the efforts of astronomer and seismologist Ioan Curea, the first rector of the University of Timișoara. Open to public since November 2022, it is also used by university students, especially those taking astronomy and astrophysics courses at the Faculty of Physics. The original planetarium projector is a Zeiss ZKP-1.

=== Art galleries ===
The Mansarda Gallery is located in the attic of the Faculty of Arts and Design. The gallery is spacious and adapted for exhibition activities, conferences, round tables, etc.

== Rankings ==
According to QS World University Rankings, West University of Timișoara ranks 94th among the best universities in Eastern Europe and Central Asia. According to Webometrics Ranking of World Universities, UVT ranks 1334th in the world and 5th in the country. In Round University Ranking, which measures the performance of universities based on 20 performance indicators grouped into four categories – teaching (40%), research (40%), international diversity (10%) and financial sustainability (10%) and six areas of studies – humanities, life sciences, natural sciences, technical sciences, social sciences and medical sciences, UVT ranks 626th in the world and 2nd in the country. In the UI GreenMetric World University Rankings, the only ranking in the world that measures the commitment of each participating university in the development of a green infrastructure, UVT ranks 791st globally and 10th nationally. In the Report no. 44/2011 regarding the external evaluation of the academic quality, the Romanian Agency for Quality Assurance in Higher Education (ARACIS) marked UVT as "highly trusting".

A summary of the presence of UVT in national and international rankings is given in the following table:

University Metaranking (2021)	3
QS World University Rankings (2022)	1001–1200
Round University Ranking (2021)	626
SCImago Institutions Rankings (2021)	793
THE World University Rankings (2022)	1201+
UI GreenMetric World University Rankings (2021)	791
University Ranking by Academic Performance (2022)	2285
Webometrics Ranking of World Universities (2022)	1334

== Notable alumni ==
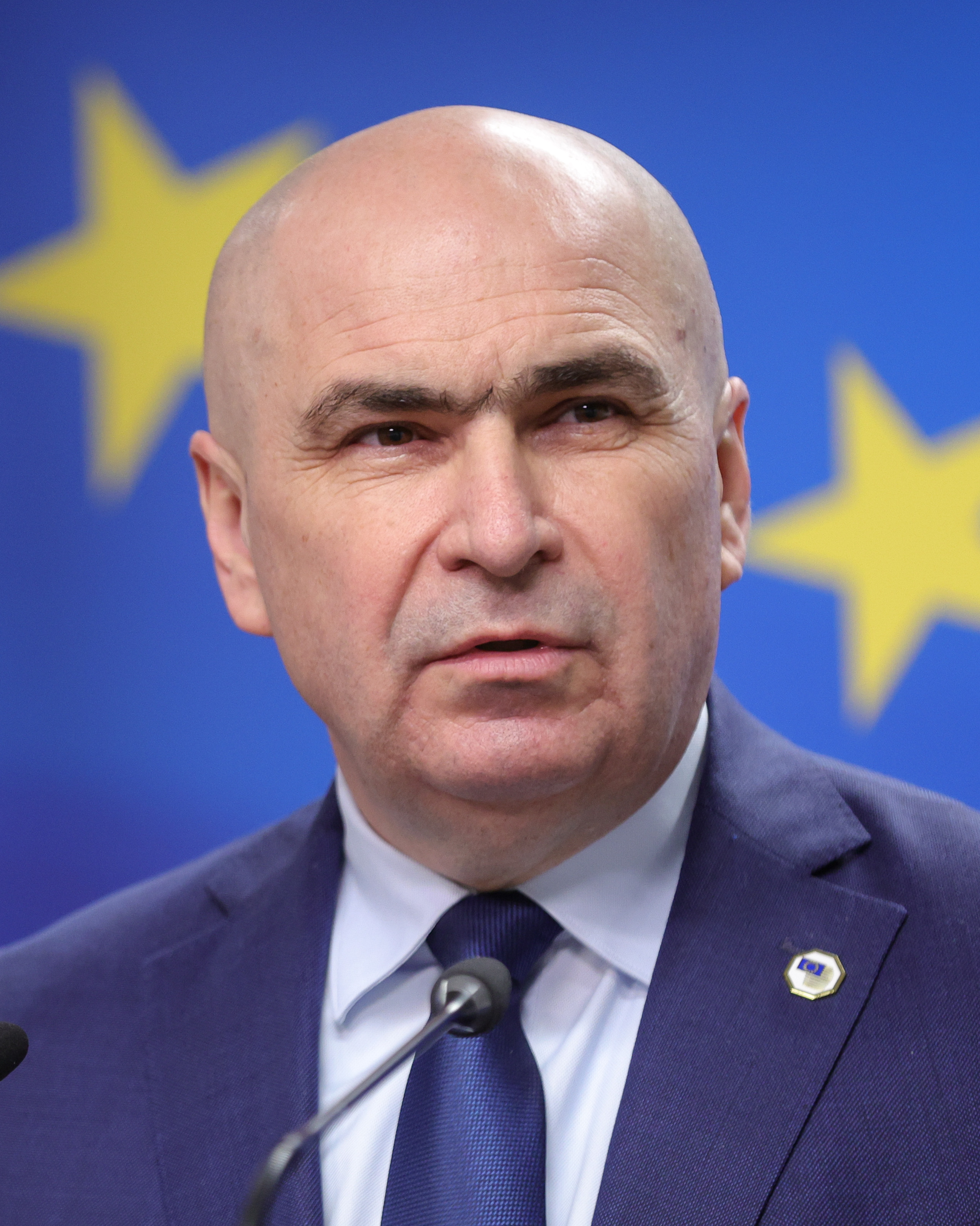
Ilie Bolojan

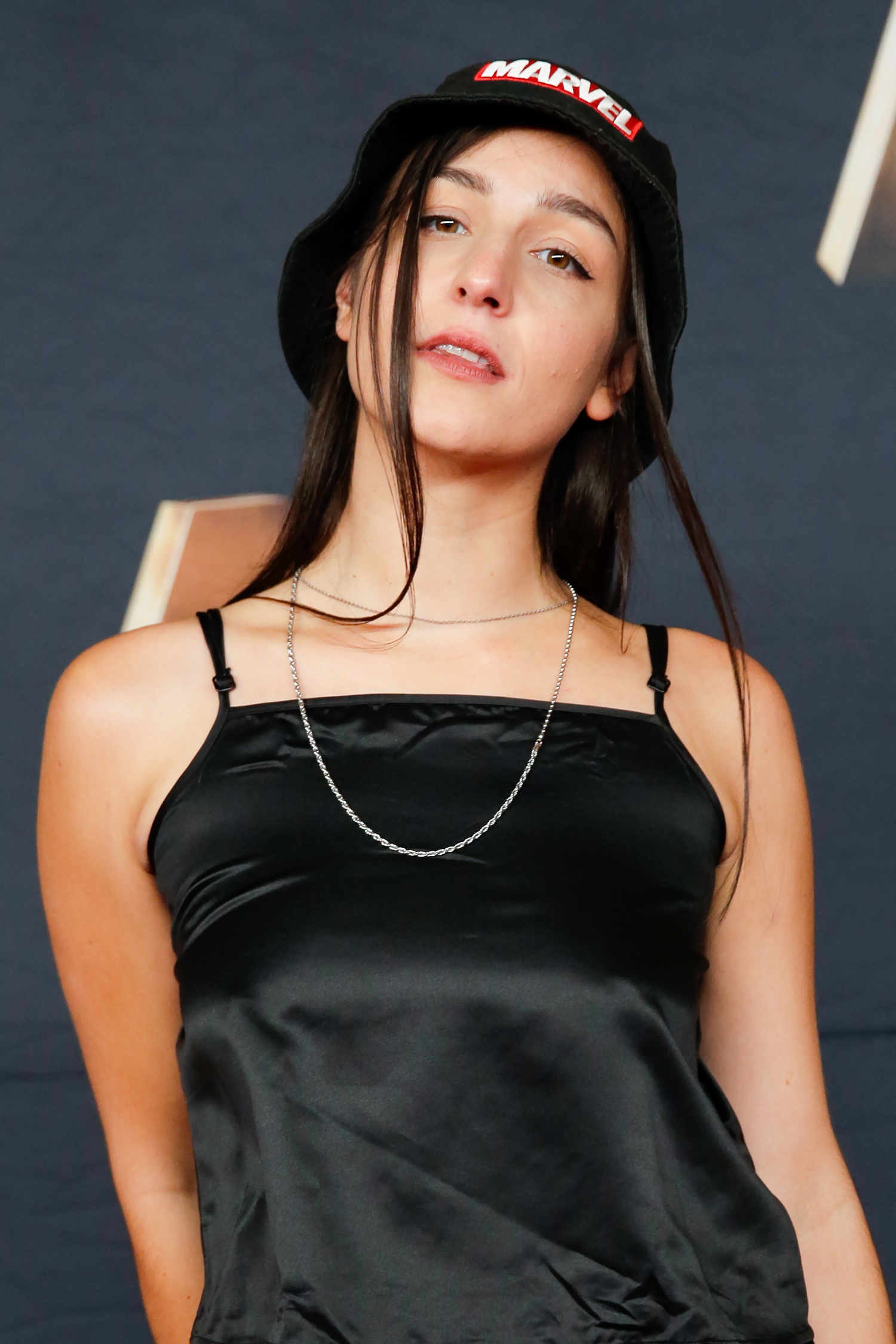
Emaa

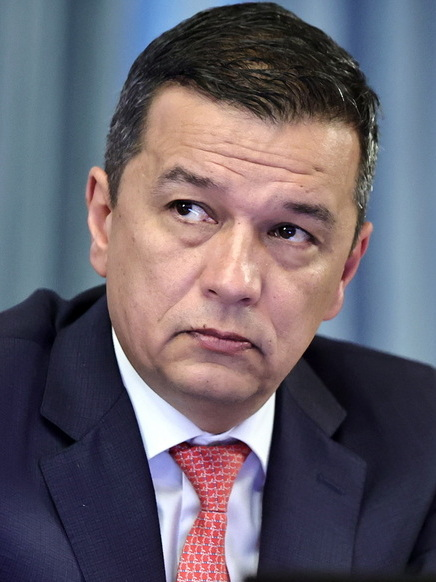
Sorin Grindeanu

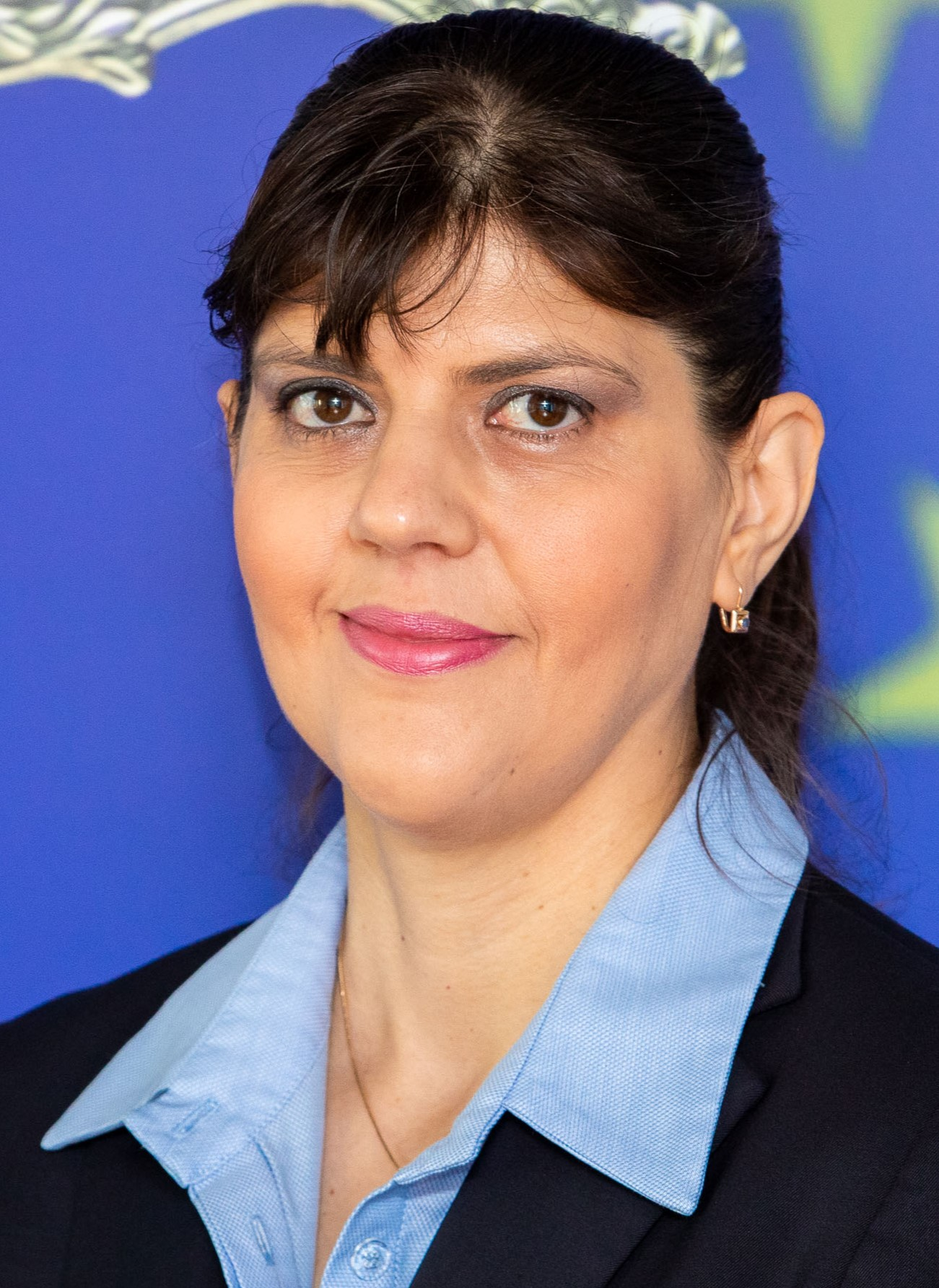
Laura Kövesi

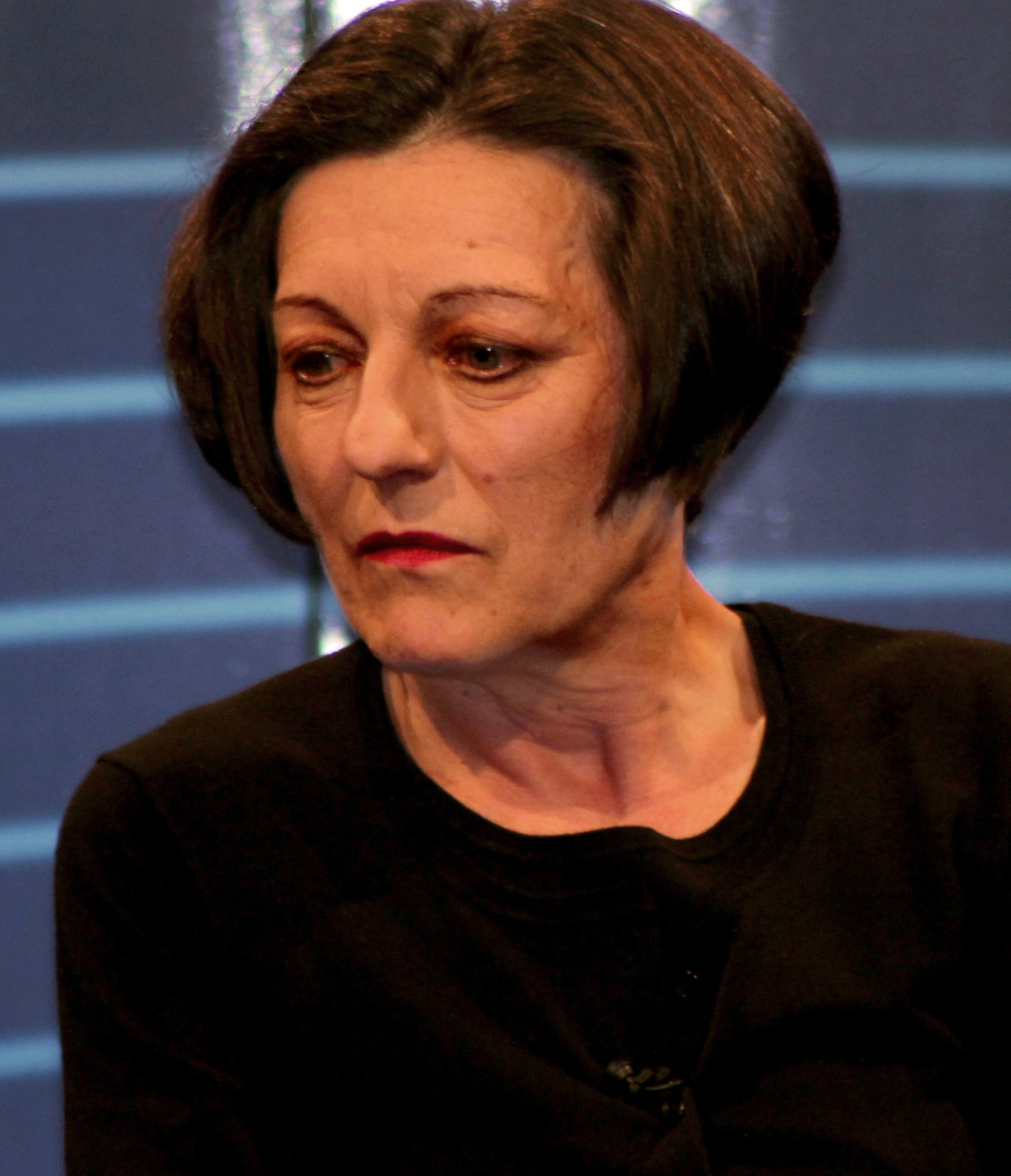
Herta Müller

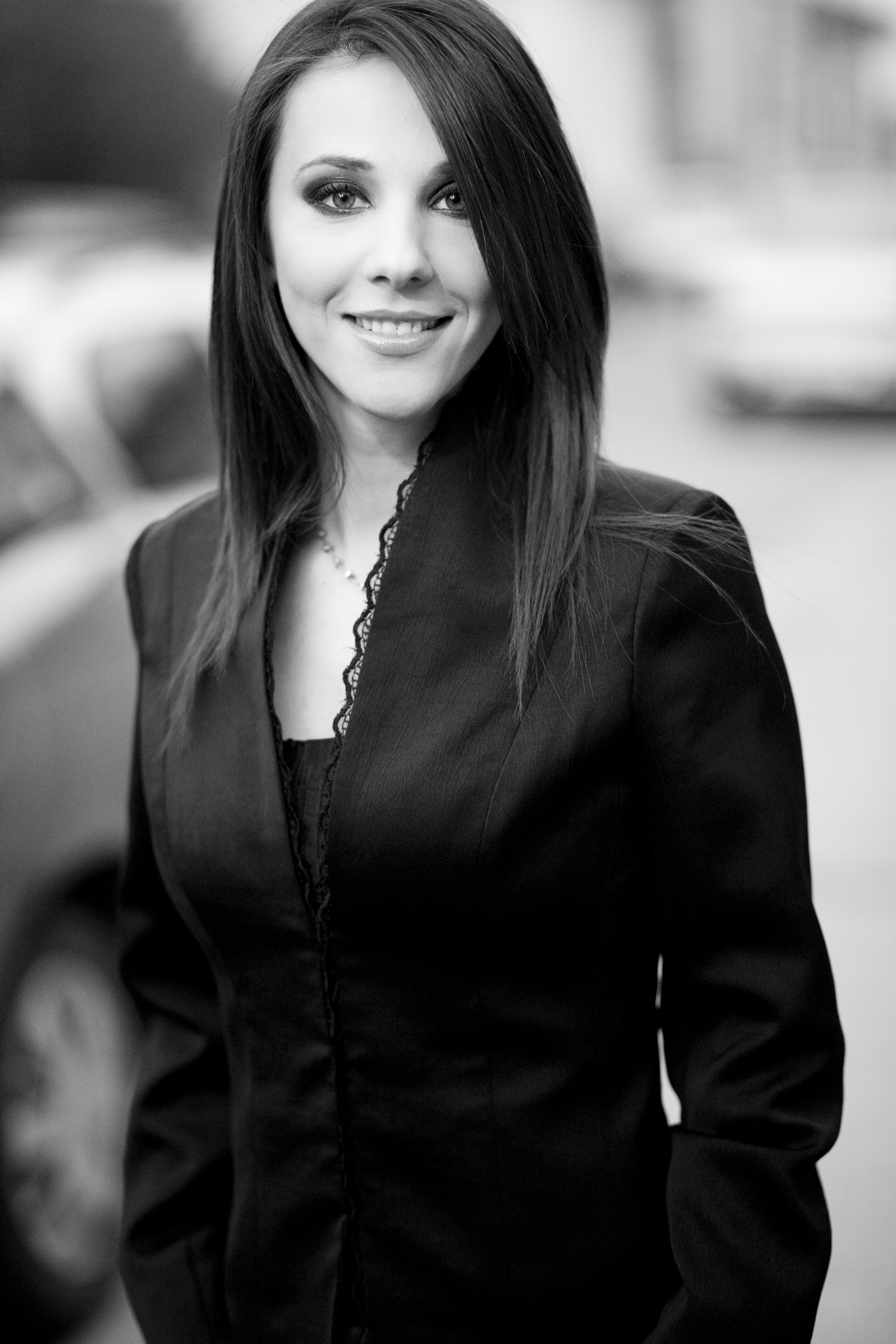
Andreea Răducan
- Simona Amânar (b. 1979), gymnast
- Titu Andreescu (b. 1956), mathematician
- Ilie Bolojan (b. 1969), mayor of Oradea (2008–2020), acting president (2025), prime minister (2025–)
- Marcel Boloș (b. 1968), finance minister (2023–2024)
- László Borbély (b. 1954), environment minister (2009–2012)
- Nicolae Covaci (b.1947 - d.2024), singer and painter
- Emaa (b. 1992), singer and songwriter
- Ovidiu Ganț (b. 1966), MEP (2007)
- Radu Pavel Gheo (b. 1969), prose writer, essayist and playwright
- Sorin Grindeanu (b. 1973), prime minister (2017)
- Beatrice Huștiu (b. 1956), figure skater
- Natalia Intotero (b. 1976), culture minister (2024–2025)
- Péter Jecza (b.1939-d.2009), professor and sculptor
- Laura Kövesi (b. 1973), European Chief Prosecutor (2019–present)
- Raluca Lăzăruț (b. 1982), actress and TV host
- Teo Milea (b. 1982), pianist and composer
- Cristian Moisescu (1946–2016), mayor of Arad (1992–1996)
- Ioan T. Morar (b. 1956), writer, journalist, diplomat and civic activist
- Dan Motreanu (b. 1970), agriculture minister (2006–2007)
- Herta Müller (b. 1953), novelist, poet, essayist and Nobel laureate in literature (2009)
- Mona Muscă (b. 1949), culture minister (2004–2005)
- Dan Negru (b. 1971), TV presenter and host
- Maria Olaru (b. 1982), gymnast
- Paul Radu (b. 1975), investigative journalist and founder of RISE Project
- Andreea Răducan (b. 1983), gymnast
- Daciana Sârbu (b. 1977), MEP (2007–2019)
- George Scripcaru (b. 1966), mayor of Brașov (2004–2020, 2024–)
- Valeriu Sepi (b.1945 - d.2026), singer and painter
- Nicolae Ștefănuță (b. 1982), MEP (2019–)
- Ștefan Szönyi (b.1913-d.1967), painter
- Aura Twarowska (b. 1967), mezzo-soprano
- Dan Vîlceanu (b. 1979), finance minister (2021)
- Richard Wagner (b.1952-d.2023), writer
- Chester Williams (1970–2019), rugby player
- Ernest Wichner (b. 1952), writer and translator
