= Bunzō =

- Gender: Male

Origin
- Origin: Japanese
- Meaning: Different meanings depending on the kanji used

Bunzō, Bunzo, Bunzou or Bunzoh (written: 文藏 or 文三) is a masculine Japanese given name. Notable people with the name include:

- Bunzō Hayata (早田 文藏; 1874–1934), Japanese botanist
- Bunzo Kimura (木村 文三; born 1942), Japanese rower
- Bunzō Nozaki (野崎 文蔵; 1829–1894), a Japanese author and journalist.
