= Motiejūnas =

- Lithuanian surname
- m.: Motiejūnas
- f.: (unmarried): Motiejūnaitė
- f.: (married): Motiejūnienė

Motiejūnas is a Lithuanian surname.

- Donatas Motiejūnas, Lithuanian basketball player
- Jonas Motiejūnas, Lithuanian sprinter
- Jonas Motiejūnas (rower)
- Lidija Motiejūnaitė (1924–2008) – Lithuanian ballet dancer, teacher, choreographer, art critic
