= John Russell (rower) =

British rower (1935–2019)

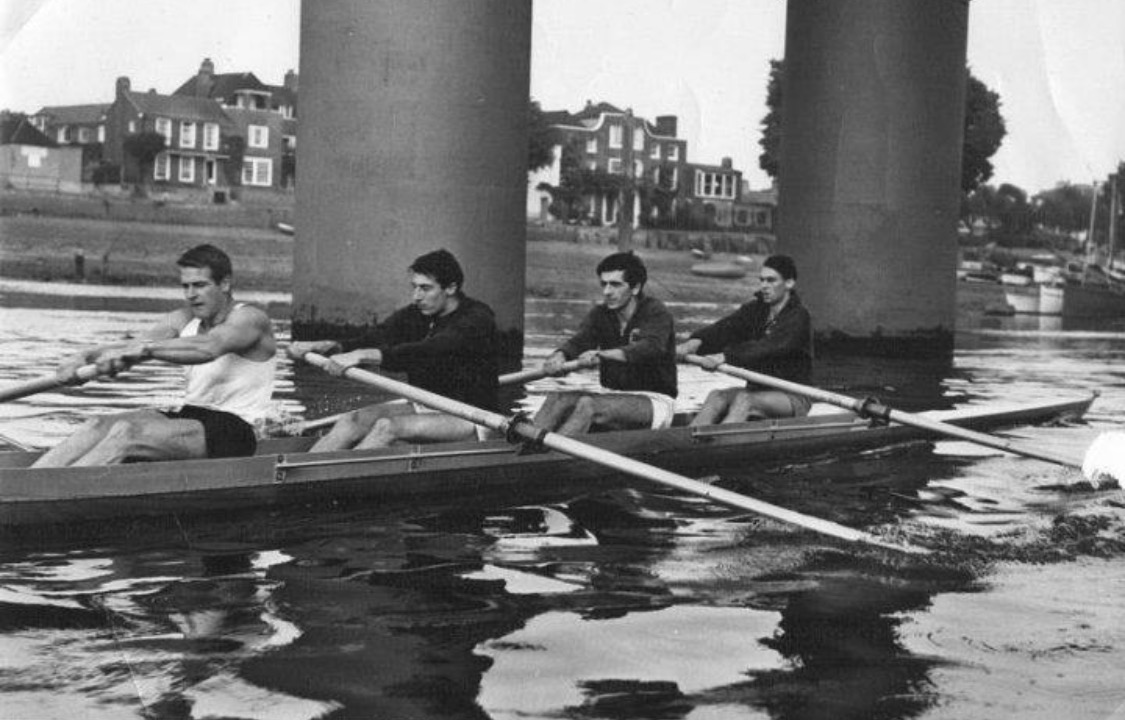
- John Russell (stroke) training with his Olympic Crew in 1964

Personal information
- Nationality: British (English)
- Born: 3 August 1935 Chiswick, London, England
- Died: 22 January 2019 (aged 83)
- Height: 183 cm (6 ft 0 in)
- Weight: 80 kg (176 lb)

Sport
- Sport: Rowing
- Event: fours / eights
- Club: Molesey BC
Medal record
Representing Great Britain
Olympic Games
Silver medal – second place	1964 Tokyo	Coxless four
Representing England
Commonwealth Games
Bronze medal – third place	1962 Perth	Coxed Fours
Bronze medal – third place	1962 Perth	Eights

John Michael Russell (3 August 1935 – 22 January 2019) was a British rower who competed in the 1960 Summer Olympics and the 1964 Summer Olympics.

== Biography ==
Russell was born in Chiswick, London. In 1959, he won both the Wingfield Sculls and the Scullers Head of the River Race. In 1960, he was a crew member of the British coxed four which was eliminated in the repechage of the coxed four event at the 1960 Summer Olympics. In the same year, he won both the Grand Challenge Cup and the Stewards Challenge Cup at Henley Royal Regatta.

Russell represented the England team at the 1962 British Empire and Commonwealth Games in Perth, Western Australia. He competed in the coxed four and eights, winning two bronze medals.

Two years later, he won a silver medal in the coxless four at the 1964 Summer Olympics with Hugh Wardell-Yerburgh, William Barry and John James.

== Gallery ==
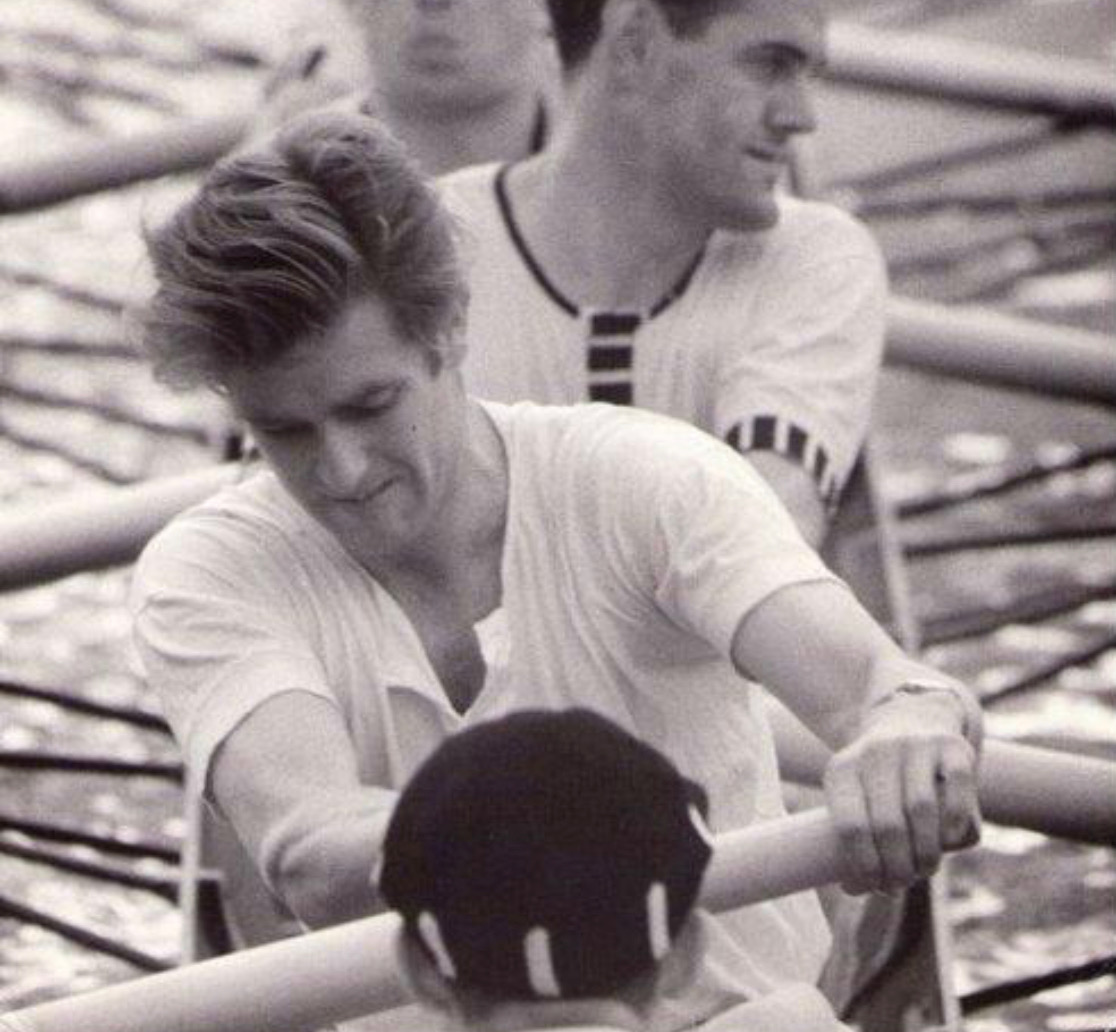
John Michael Russell (stroke)

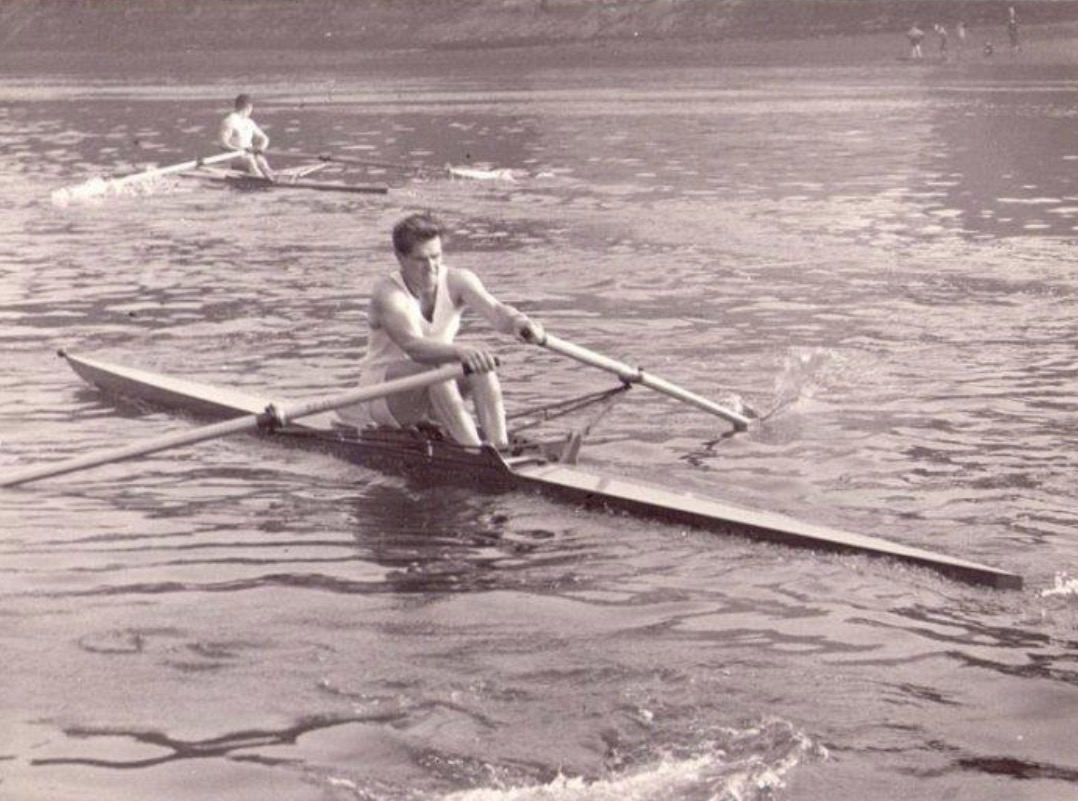
On the way to winning Scullers Head of the River Race in 1959

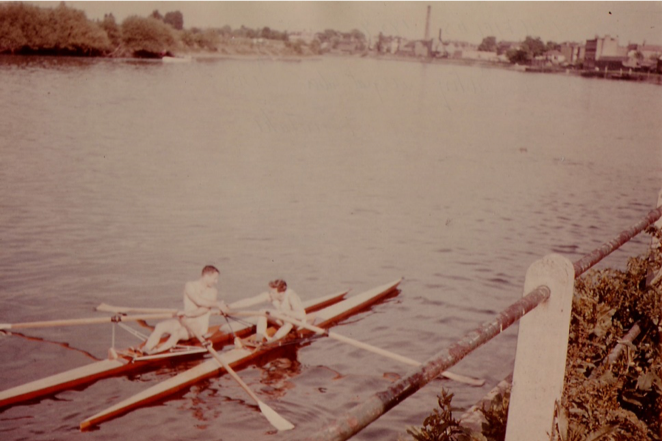
Russell after winning the Wingfield Sculls in 1960

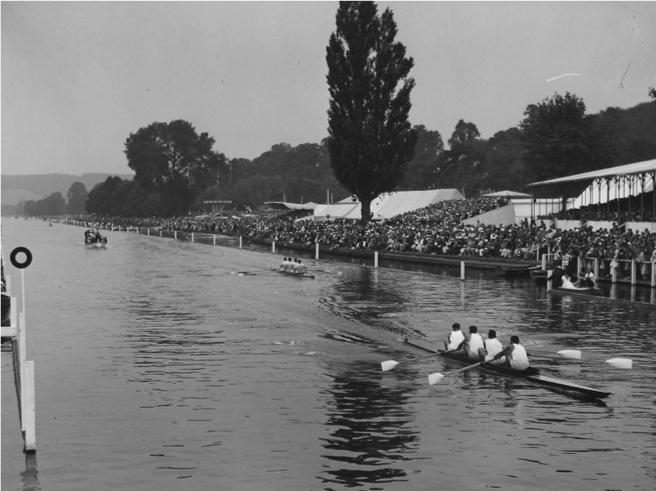
Russell winning the Stewards Challenge Cup in 1960]

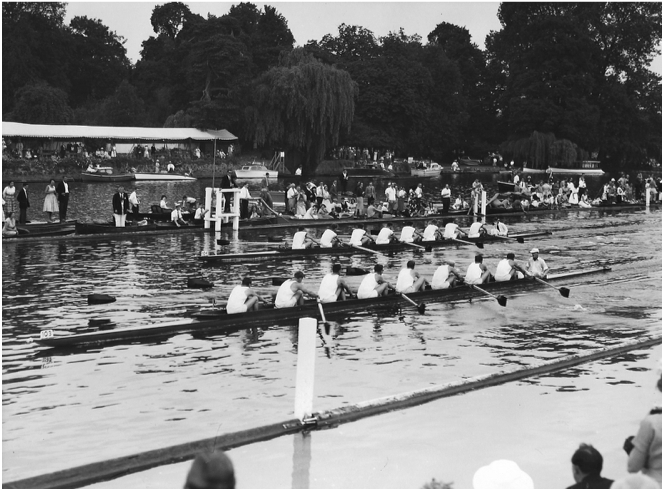
Russell winning the Grand Challenge Cup in 1960

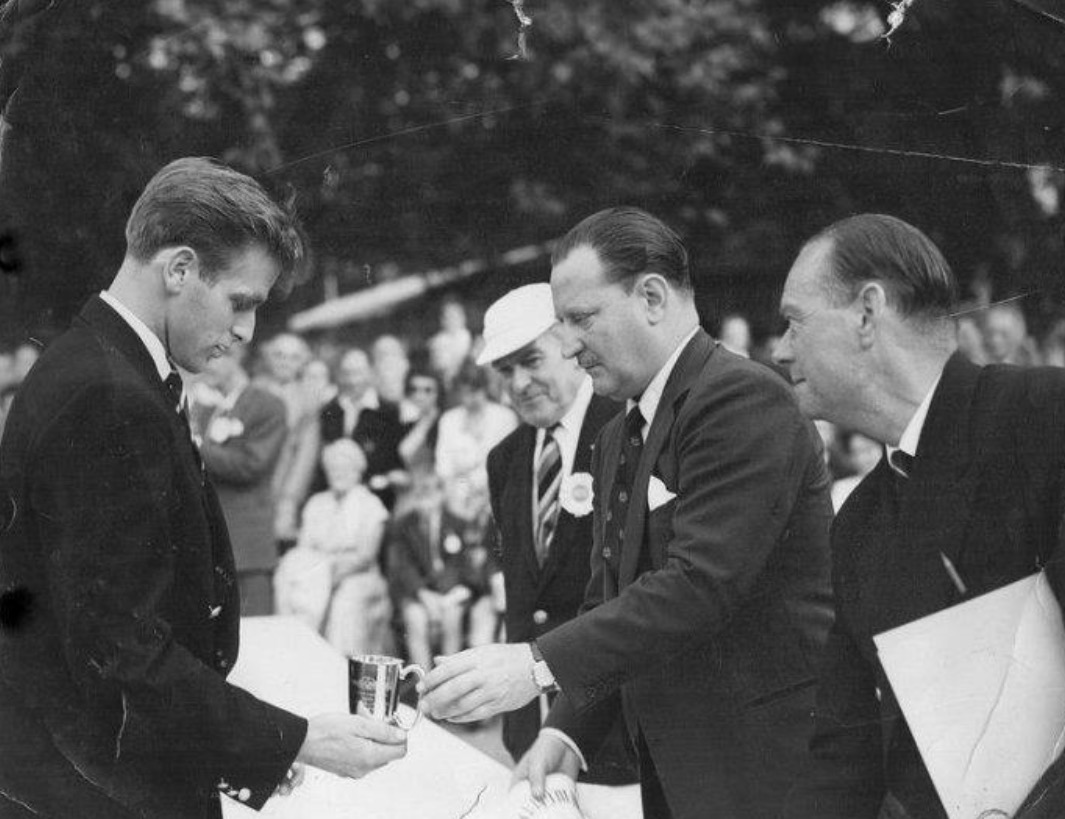
John Michael Russell (left)
