= Castelein =

Castelein is a surname. Notable people with the surname include:

- Sipke Castelein (born 1941), Dutch rower
- Sonja Castelein (born 1954), Belgian middle-distance runner
