= Iannuzzi =

Iannuzzi is an Italian surname that may refer to the following notable people:

- Alessandro Iannuzzi (born 1975), Italian football manager and former player;
- Carol Iannuzzi (fl. 2020s), former candidate for United States Congress in 2020;
- Dan Iannuzzi (1934–2004), full name Daniel Andrèa Iannuzzi, a Canadian entrepreneur;
- Fiamma Benítez Iannuzzi (born 2004), Spanish footballer;
- Gaetano Iannuzzi (born 1972), full name Gaetano Iannuzzi, an Italian rowing coach;
- Joseph Iannuzzi (1930/31–2015), Gambino crime family associate also known as "Joe Dogs", "Joe Diner" and "Joe Drywall";
- Juan Alberto Iannuzzi (born 1941), Argentine rower;
- Marco Iannuzzi (born 1987), Canadian football wide receiver;
- Yanina Iannuzzi (born 1973), Argentine fencer;
- Lino Jannuzzi (born 1928), Italian journalist.
