= Hugh Wardell-Yerburgh =

British rower

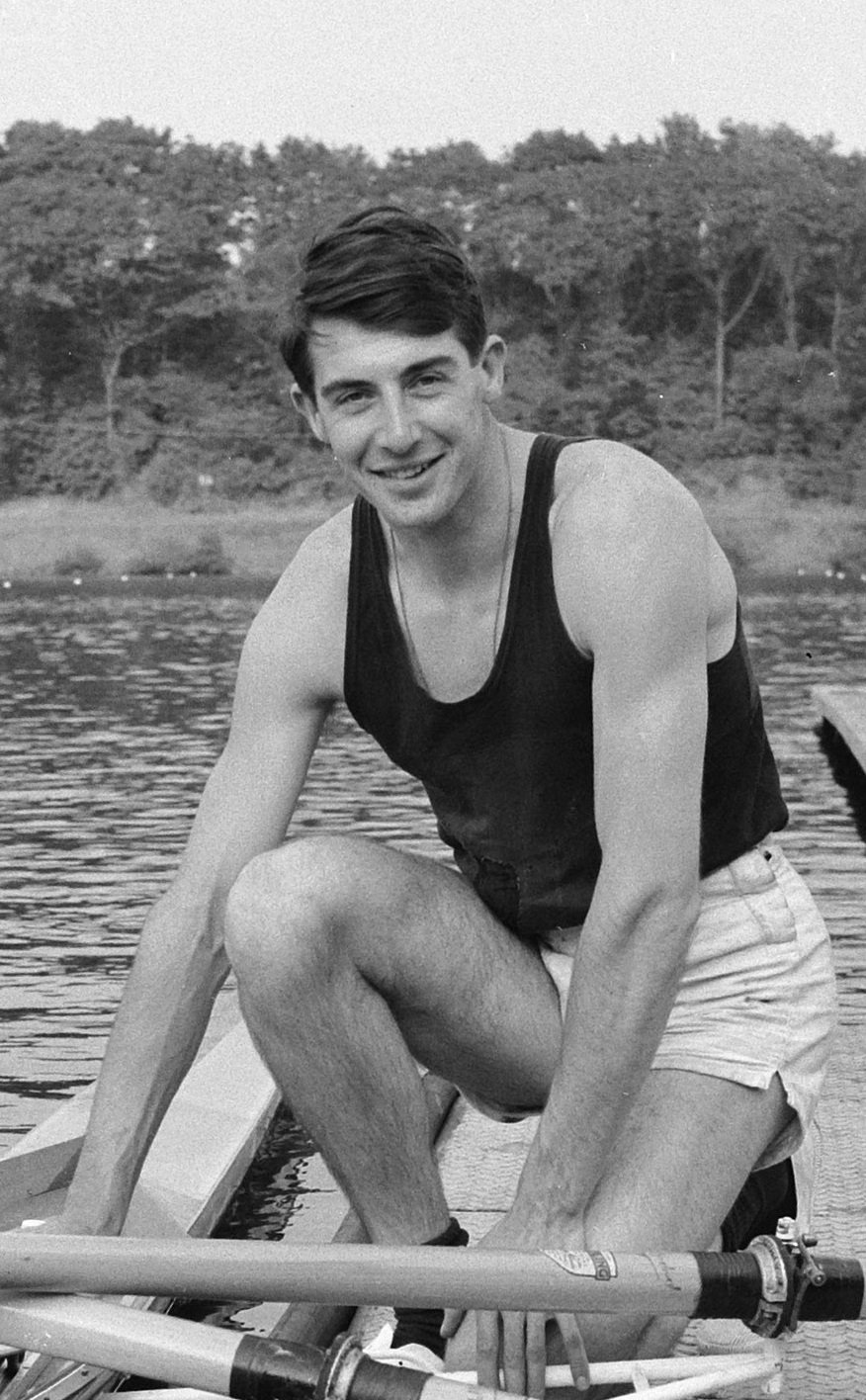
- Hugh Wardell-Yerburgh in 1965

Personal information
- Born: 11 January 1938
- Died: 28 January 1970 (aged 32) Chertsey, Surrey, UK
- Height: 1.89 m (6 ft 2 in)
- Weight: 83 kg (183 lb)

Sport
- Sport: Rowing
Medal record
Representing Great Britain
Summer Olympics
Silver medal – second place	1964 Tokyo	Coxless four

Hugh Arthur Wardell-Yerburgh (11 January 1938 – 28 January 1970) was a British schoolmaster and rower. He won a silver medal in the coxless fours event at the 1964 Summer Olympics, together with John Russell, William Barry and John James.

== Early life ==
Wardell-Yerburgh was the younger son of Geoffrey Bassett Wardell-Yerburgh, by his marriage in 1935 to Elizabeth Alis Georgina Kenyon, a daughter of G. L. T. Kenyon, a grandson of Lloyd Kenyon, 3rd Baron Kenyon. He had an older brother, Oswald Kenyon Wardell-Yerburgh (born 1936). They were grandsons of Oswald Wardell-Yerburgh (1858–1913).

When Wardell-Yerburgh was a small boy, the family lived at Carlingford House, East Harptree, near to his grandmother, Edith Wardell-Yerburgh. On 15 February 1944, when he was six, his father died, leaving an estate valued at £27,227. He was brought up by his mother, who went to live at Meadow View, Westbury, Wiltshire. He was educated at Ravenscroft School, Eton College, and Bristol University, where he took a degree in aeronautical engineering. For his National Service, he served for eighteen months in the Royal Artillery.

== Career ==
A successful oarsman at Eton and Bristol, in 1964 Wardell-Yerburgh rowed for Great Britain in the Coxless Fours at the 1964 Summer Olympics in Tokyo, gaining a Silver medal. From 1966 to 1968, he returned to Eton as a schoolmaster.

In 1968 he won the Diamond Challenge Sculls (the premier singles sculls event) at the Henley Royal Regatta, rowing for the Eton Vikings. The same year, he joined Plessey as a Senior Radar Systems Analyst.

== Private life ==
In 1966 Wardell-Yerburgh married Janet (Poppy) Bewley Cathie, an Olympic fencer. They had one daughter, Atlanta Jane Kenyon Wardell-Yerburgh, born in 1969, who was educated at Worcester College, Oxford and became a chartered accountant.

Wardell-Yerburgh died in a traffic accident in 1970, aged only 32. He was then living at Mallards Reach, Ham Island, Old Windsor, and left an estate valued at £22,570.
