= John James (rower) =

British rower (1937–2024)

Olympic medal record

Men's rowing
Silver medal – second place	1964 Tokyo	Coxless four

John Jesse James (21 September 1937 – 28 October 2024) was a British rower who competed in the 1964 Summer Olympics.

In 1964 he was a crew member of the British boat which won the silver medal in the coxless fours event with John Russell, Hugh Wardell-Yerburgh, and William Barry.
