= Cristian Moisescu =

Romanian politician

Mayor of Arad
- In office 1992–1996
- Preceded by: Mircea Henț
- Succeeded by: Dumitru Branc

Personal details
- Born: 9 July 1947 Arad, Romania
- Died: 7 January 2016 (aged 68) Arad, Romania
- Party: Civic Alliance Foundation
- Education: West University of Timișoara

Cristian Moisescu (9 July 1946 – 7 January 2016) was a Romanian politician who served as the first Mayor of Arad of the post-communist period, being named by Civic Alliance Foundation.

He was an evangelical.
