= Juan Zanassi =

Argentine rower (1947–2022)

Personal information
- Full name: Juan Francisco Zanassi
- Born: 19 February 1947; Tigre, Argentina
- Died: 4 April 2022 (aged 75); Guatemala City, Guatemala

Sport
- Sport: Rowing

Juan Francisco Zanassi (19 February 1947 – 4 April 2022) was an Argentine rower. He competed in the men's coxless four event at the 1964 Summer Olympics.
