= Geoffrey Picard =

American rower (1943–2002)

Olympic medal record

Men's rowing
Bronze medal – third place	1964 Tokyo	Coxless four

Geoffrey William Picard (March 20, 1943 – September 14, 2002) was an American rower who competed in the 1964 Summer Olympics. He was born in Oakland, California. In 1964 he was a crew member of the American boat which won the bronze medal in the coxless fours event.

He graduated from Harvard University and Harvard Business School.
