= Philippe Malivoire =

French rower

Personal information
- Nationality: French
- Born: 7 August 1942
- Died: 1 May 2013 (aged 70)

Sport
- Sport: Rowing

Philippe Malivoire (7 August 1942 – 10 May 2013) was a French rower. He competed in the men's coxless four event at the 1964 Summer Olympics.
