= Kurt Helmudt =

Danish rower

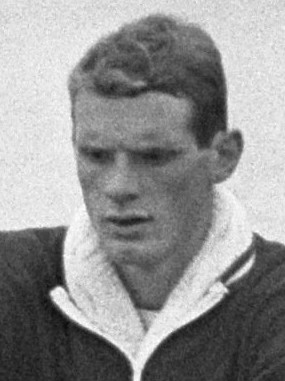
- Helmudt at the 1964 European Championships

Personal information
- Born: 7 December 1943 Copenhagen, Denmark
- Died: 7 September 2018 (aged 74)
- Height: 1.94 m (6 ft 4 in)
- Weight: 100 kg (220 lb)

Sport
- Sport: Rowing
- Club: Roforeningen KVIK, Copenhagen
Medal record
Men's rowing
Representing Denmark
Olympic Games
Gold medal – first place	1964 Tokyo	Coxless four
World Rowing Championships
Bronze medal – third place	1970 St. Catharines	Coxless four
European Rowing Championships
Silver medal – second place	1964 Amsterdam	Coxless four

Kurt Helmudt (7 December 1943 – 7 September 2018) was a Danish rower. Together with Bjørn Hasløv, Erik Petersen and John Hansen he won a gold medal at the 1964 Summer Olympics and a silver medal at the 1964 European Championships in the coxless fours event. He also won a bronze medal at the 1970 World Rowing Championships with another team.
