= Teo Milea =

Romanian pianist and composer (born 1982)

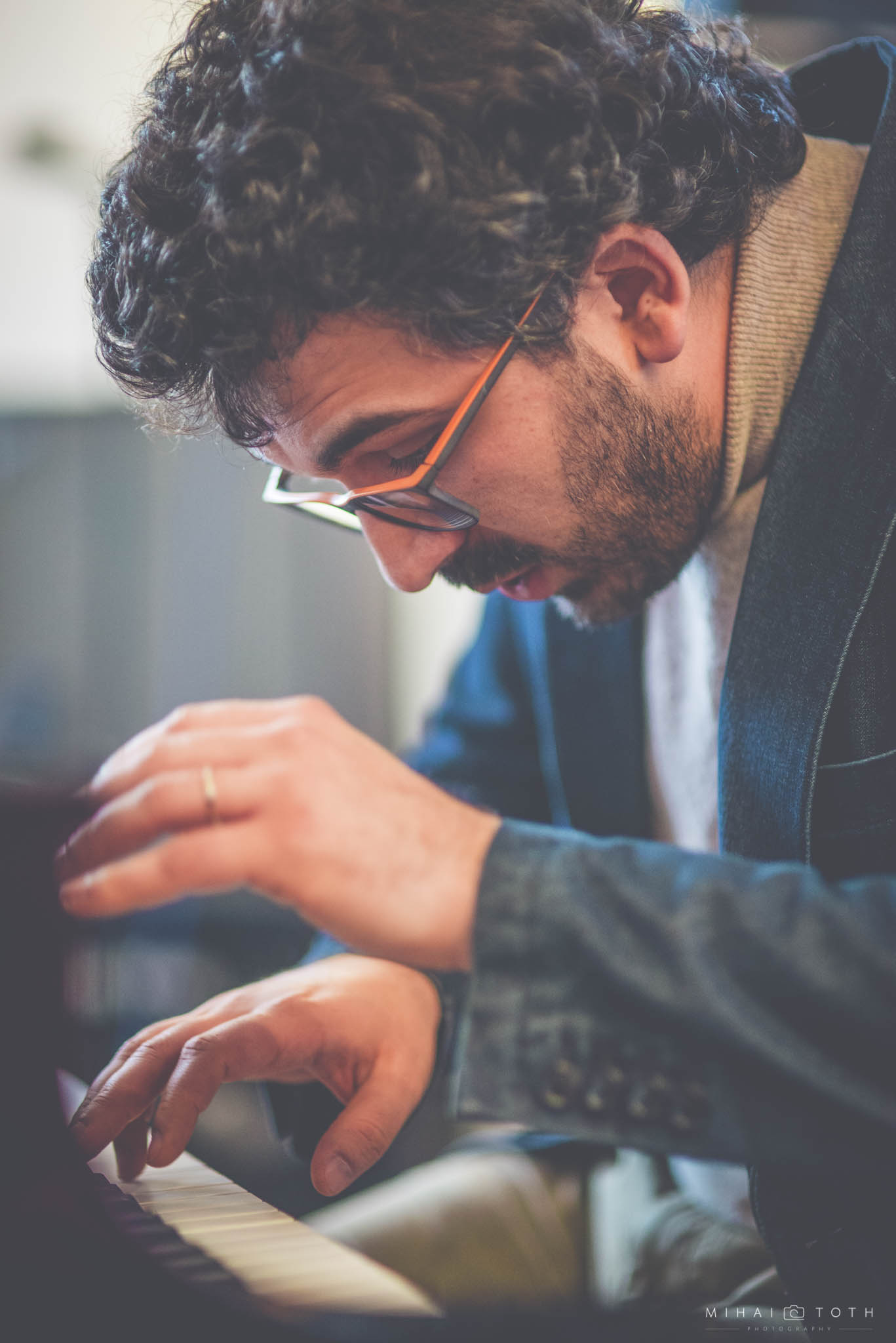
- Teo Milea in 2015

Background information
- Born: Teodor Milea; April 21, 1982 (age 44)
- Origin: Chișineu-Criș, Arad County, Romania
- Genres: Classical, neoclassical, jazz
- Occupations: Pianist, composer
- Instrument: Piano
- Years active: 2005–present
- Website: teomilea.com

Teo Milea (born April 21, 1982, Chișineu-Criș, Arad County, Romania) is a Romanian pianist and composer. He lives in Toronto, Ontario, Canada.

== Biography ==
He began playing the piano at the age of 6 at the Music Lyceum "Sabin Dragoi" in Arad, and he graduated the Facultyyyy of Music at the West University of Timișoara in 2005.

After graduating he joined several jazz bands, such as Horea Crișovan Quartet or The Trumpet Sound, together with whom he performed in clubs and festivals in Timișoara, Arad and Caraș Severin. He has worked with Amalia Gaiță at "Sounds of Christmas" and "Colours", and they have supported together Timișoara's candidacy for 2021 European Capital of Culture.

During Easter, in 2011, he performed in Bern, Switzerland.

In July 2012 he released his first album on white... and black keys at Timișoara, and after he performed at Vienna, Nuremberg, Dortmund and on October 25 at Godot Cafe-teatru in Bucharest. On December 1, 2012 he performed his music at the NATO Headquarters in Brussels, Belgium celebrating Romania's National Day. The album on white... and black keys was the runner up of Radio SoloPiano.com 2015 "Classical" Album of the Year in the United States.

He married Raluca on July 26, 2013. Raluca Milea acts as his Artist Manager.

In 2015 he released Open Minds, his second album, performing at Sala Capitol of Banatul Philharmonic of Timișoara. This performance represented, also, a farewell before his departure to Canada. He moved in Toronto on October 21, 2015. Open Minds was the winner of Radio SoloPiano.com 2016 "Classical" Album of the Year.

In 2016 he was one of the top four finalists of CBC Music's Searchlight 2016, organized by CBC Music, with his song Irreversible. There were 2,000 songs submitted for this contest.

He performed in Chicago, in February 2017, and during May 2017 at The Jazz Room, Waterloo, Ontario, Al Green Theatre in Toronto and at Conservatoire de Musique du Québec in Montréal.

== Discography ==
- on white... and black keys, 2012
- Open Minds, 2015

== Prizes ==
- Runner-up of Radio SoloPiano.com 2015 "Classical" Album of the Year, with the on white... and black keys album;
- Winner of Radio SoloPiano.com 2015 "Classical" Album of the Year, with the Open Minds album;
- Finalist of CBC Music's Searchlight 2016 with the song Irreversible from the on white... and black keys album.
