= Anthony Walker (rower) =

Australian rower (born 1939)

Personal information
- Nationality: Australian
- Born: 19 November 1939 (age 86)

Sport
- Sport: Rowing
- Club: Mercantile Rowing Club

Achievements and titles
- National finals: Penrith Cup 1960-62 , Coxless four Aust title 1964

Anthony Walker (born 19 November 1939) is an Australian former representative rower. He was a national champion at both the lightweight and open levels and competed in the men's coxless four event at the 1964 Summer Olympics.

== Club, state and Olympic rowing ==
Walker took up rowing as a 17 year old beginner at Mercantile Rowing Club and all his senior rowing was from that club.

Walker was selected in Victorian state representative lightweight fours contesting the Penrith Cup at the Interstate Regatta within the Australian Rowing Championships in 1960, 1961 and 1962. That 1962 crew won the Penrith Cup.

In 1964 Walker joined a determined Mercantile heavyweight coxless four who had their eyes set a national championship and Olympic selection. They won the national title at the 1964 Australian Rowing Championships and then were selected in-toto as Australia's coxless four entrants for the 1964 Tokyo Olympics with Walker in the bow seat. In Tokyo they placed 4th in their heat and 4th in the repechage, to be eliminated at that point, missing the B final and an overall regatta placing.

== Post-rowing ==
After competitive rowing Walker had a long association with the boat shed of Melbourne Grammar School and was the school's Boat Shed Manager for over 30 years.
