= Erik Petersen (rower) =

Danish rower (1939–2025)

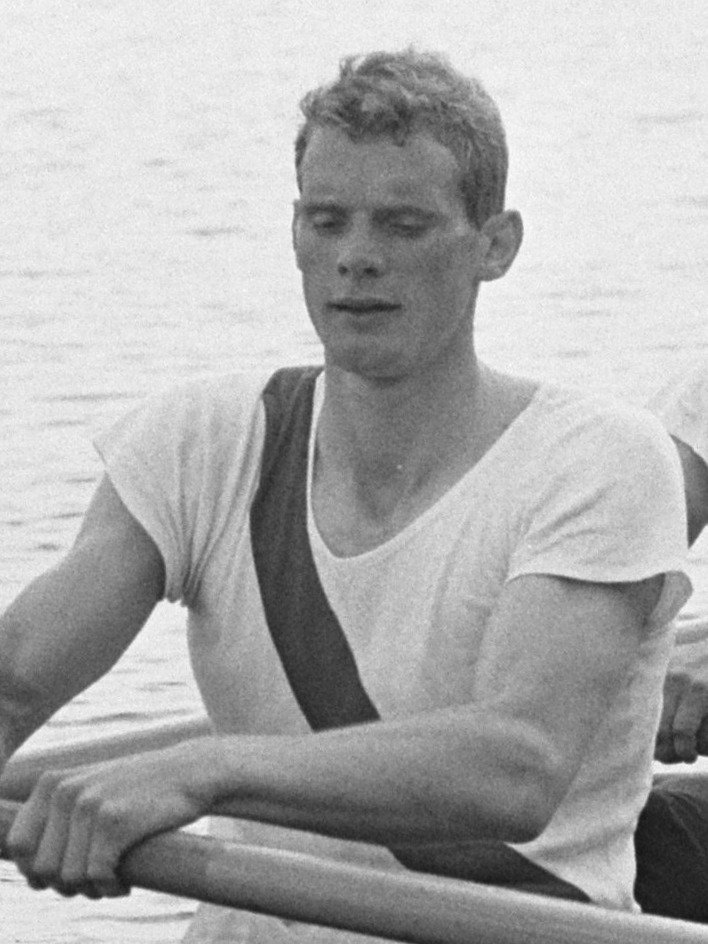
- Petersen at the 1964 European Championships

Personal information
- Born: 23 September 1939 Copenhagen, Denmark
- Died: 21 February 2025 (aged 85)
- Height: 1.84 m (6 ft 0 in)
- Weight: 81 kg (179 lb)

Sport
- Sport: Rowing
- Club: Roforeningen KVIK, Copenhagen
Medal record
Men's rowing
Representing Denmark
Olympic Games
Gold medal – first place	1964 Tokyo	Coxless four
World Rowing Championships
Bronze medal – third place	1970 St. Catharines	Coxless four
European Rowing Championships
Silver medal – second place	1964 Amsterdam	Coxless four

Erik Petersen (23 September 1939 – 21 February 2025) was a Danish rower. Together with Bjørn Hasløv, Kurt Helmudt and John Hansen he won a gold medal at the 1964 Summer Olympics and a silver medal at the 1964 European Championships in the coxless fours event. He also won a bronze medal at the 1970 World Rowing Championships with another team.
