= John Hansen (rower) =

Danish rower

Personal information
- Born: 8 October 1938 Copenhagen, Denmark
- Died: 29 August 2022 (aged 83) Køge, Denmark
- Height: 1.85 m (6 ft 1 in)
- Weight: 82 kg (181 lb)

Sport
- Sport: Rowing
- Club: Roforeningen KVIK, Copenhagen, Køge Roklub
Medal record
Representing Denmark
Olympic Games
Gold medal – first place	1964 Tokyo	Coxless four
European Rowing Championships
Silver medal – second place	1964 Amsterdam	Coxless four

John Ørsted Hansen (8 October 1938 – 29 August 2022) was a retired Danish rower. Together with Erik Petersen, Kurt Helmudt and Bjørn Hasløv he won the gold medal at the 1964 Summer Olympics and a silver medal at the 1964 European Championships in the coxless fours event.
