= Yasuji Honma =

Japanese rower (born 1943)

Personal information
- Nationality: Japanese
- Born: 2 October 1943 (age 81)

Sport
- Sport: Rowing

Yasuji Honma (本間 康二, Honma Yasuji, born 2 October 1943) is a Japanese rower. He competed in the men's coxless four event at the 1964 Summer Olympics.
