= Ted Mittet =

American rower (1941–2024)

Personal information
- Full name: Theodore Peder Mittet
- Born: December 23, 1941 Seattle, Washington, U.S.
- Died: December 27, 2024 (aged 83)
Medal record
Men's rowing
Representing United States
Olympic Games
Bronze medal – third place	1964 Tokyo	Coxless four

Theodore Peder "Ted" Mittet (December 23, 1941 – December 27, 2024) was an American rower who competed in the 1964 Summer Olympics. Mittet was born in Seattle, Washington. In 1964 he was a crew member of the American boat which won the bronze medal in the coxless fours event.
