= Atilio Ensunza =

Argentine rower

Personal information
- Nationality: Argentine
- Born: 7 July 1937
- Died: 8 July 1999 (aged 62)

Sport
- Sport: Rowing

Atilio Ensunza (7 July 1937 – 8 July 1999) is an Argentine rower. He competed in the men's coxless four event at the 1964 Summer Olympics.
