= Bjørn Hasløv =

Danish rower

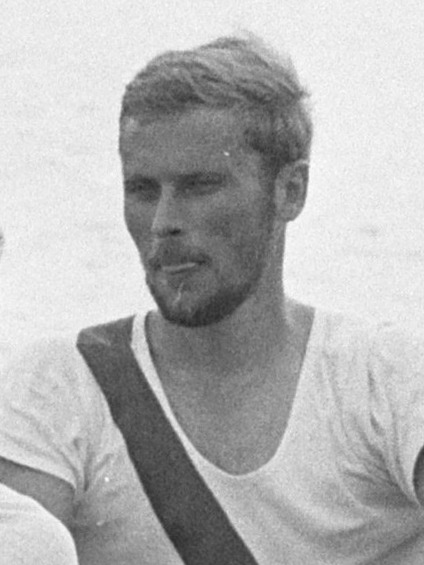

Personal information
- Born: 18 May 1941 (age 85) Copenhagen, Denmark
- Height: 1.82 m (6 ft 0 in)
- Weight: 82 kg (181 lb)

Sport
- Sport: Rowing
- Club: Roforeningen KVIK, Copenhagen
Medal record
Representing Denmark
Olympic Games
Gold medal – first place	1964 Tokyo	Coxless four
European Rowing Championships
Silver medal – second place	1964 Amsterdam	Coxless four

Bjørn Borgen Hasløv (born 18 May 1941) is a Danish retired rower. Together with Erik Petersen, Kurt Helmudt and John Hansen he won a gold medal at the 1964 Summer Olympics and a silver medal at the 1964 European Championships in the coxless fours event.
