= Robert Brookson =

Canadian rower

Personal information
- Nationality: Canadian
- Born: 15 April 1939
- Died: 31 March 1993 (aged 53)

Sport
- Sport: Rowing

Robert Brookson (15 April 1939 – 31 March 1993) was a Canadian rower. He competed in the men's coxless four event at the 1964 Summer Olympics.
