= Simon Newcomb (rower) =

Australian rower (born 1938)

Personal information
- Nationality: Australian
- Born: 11 August 1938 (age 87)
- Education: Melbourne Grammar School

Sport
- Sport: Rowing
- Club: Mercantile Rowing Club

Simon Newcomb OAM (born 11 August 1938) is an Australian former representative rower. He competed in the men's coxless four event at the 1964 Summer Olympics. After competitive rowing he was a coach and administrator and heavily involved in the development of the sport of rowing in Queensland.

== Club and state rowing ==
Newcomb was educated at Melbourne Grammar School where he took up rowing. His senior club rowing was from Mercantile Rowing Club in Melbourne including terms as club vice-captain and captain

Newcomb rowed in Mercantile men's eights which won the Victorian state title in 1960, 1961, 1963 and 1964. In 1961 he was selected in the Victorian state representative men's senior eight which contested and won the King's Cup at the Interstate Regatta within the Australian Rowing Championships. In 1964 in an all Mercantile boat he won the coxless four national title at the Australian Rowing Championships.

== International representative rowing ==
Newcomb first gained national selection in 1962 when he was selected as a reserve for the men's sweep squad which attended the inaugural World Rowing Championships on Lucerne. He did not race.

For the 1964 Tokyo Olympics, the Australian 1964 national champion Mercantile Rowing Club coxless four was selected in-toto as Australia's coxless four entrants with Newcomb in the three seat. They placed 4th in their heat and 4th in the repechage, to be eliminated at that point, missing the B final and an overall regatta placing.

== Coaching and administration ==
After retiring from competitive rowing Newcomb immediately became involved as a coach and later the Director of Rowing at Brighton Grammar School.

In the mid-1970s Newcomb relocated to the Sunshine Coast in Queensland. Over the next thirty years he was tireless in supporting the growth of rowing in that region and in making the sport more broadly accessible at the schools level. He founded and was inaugual President of the Noosa Rowing Club. He was a coach and Director of Rowing at The Southport School and Brisbane Boys College. He was CEO of Rowing Queensland from 1993 to 1997 and in 2008 was awarded an Order of Australia medal for services to the sport of rowing in Queensland.
