= Jorge Meana =

Argentine rower

Personal information
- Nationality: Argentine
- Born: 27 December 1938 (age 86)

Sport
- Sport: Rowing

Jorge Meana (born 27 December 1938) is an Argentine rower. He competed in the men's coxless four event at the 1964 Summer Olympics.
