= Covaci =

Covaci is the Romanian form of the name Kovač (Ковач), meaning "forger" or "blacksmith" in Slavic languages. Notable people with the surname include:

- Ion Covaci, also known as Ianos Kovacs or János Kovács, Romanian boxer
- Iosif Covaci, Romanian alpine skier
- Ludovic Covaci-Borbely, Romanian rower
- Meletie Covaci, Romanian Catholic bishop
- Nicolae Covaci, Romanian-Hungarian football player and coach
- Nicu Covaci, Romanian painter, music composer, leader of rock and cult band Phoenix
- Răzvan Covaci (born 2003), Romanian footballer
- Ştefan Covaci, Romanian football player and coach
- Gheorghe Covaciu, Romanian handballer

== See also ==
- Covaci, a village in Sânandrei commune, Timiș County, Romania
