= Shunsuke Miki =

Japanese rower (born 1944)

Personal information
- Nationality: Japanese
- Born: 6 February 1944 (age 81); Hiroshima, Japan

Sport
- Sport: Rowing

Shunsuke Miki (三木 俊介, Miki Shunsuke, born 6 February 1944) is a Japanese rower. He competed in the men's coxless four event at the 1964 Summer Olympics.
