= Koju Tsukamoto =

Japanese rower (1942–2004)

Personal information
- Nationality: Japanese
- Born: 1 February 1942
- Died: 29 August 2004 (aged 62)

Sport
- Sport: Rowing

Koju Tsukamoto (塚本 公樹, Tsukamoto Kōju, 1 February 1942 – 29 August 2004) was a Japanese rower. He competed in the men's coxless four event at the 1964 Summer Olympics.
