= Juan Alberto Iannuzzi =

Argentine rower

Personal information
- Nationality: Argentine
- Born: 3 July 1941 (age 84)

Sport
- Sport: Rowing

Juan Alberto Iannuzzi (born 3 July 1941) is an Argentine rower. He competed in the men's coxless four event at the 1964 Summer Olympics.
