= Sjoerd Wartena =

Dutch rower (born 1939)

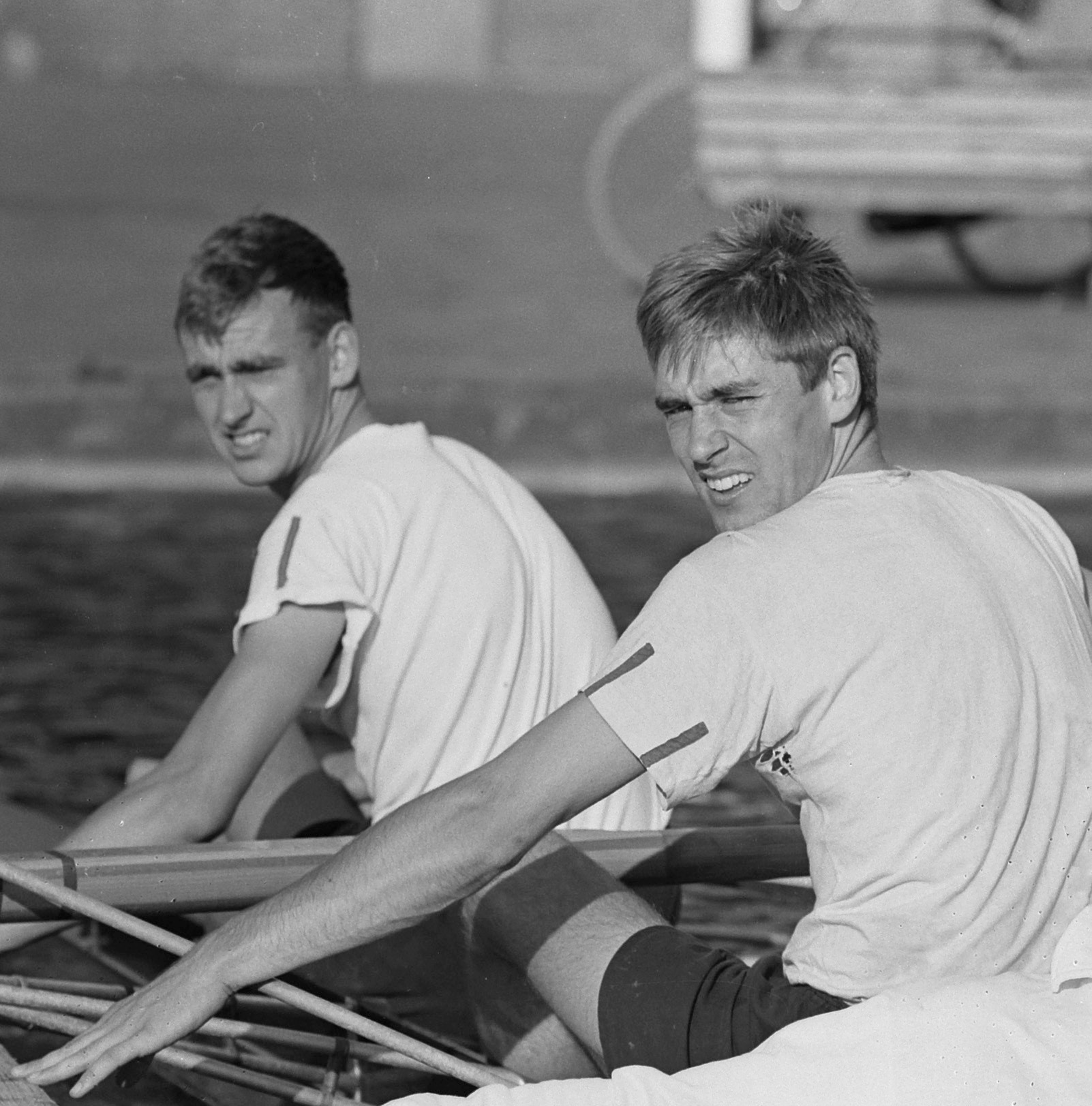
- Sipke Castelein and Sjoerd Wartena (right) in 1963

Personal information
- Born: 1 May 1939 (age 87) Amsterdam, the Netherlands
- Height: 1.89 m (6 ft 2 in)
- Weight: 76 kg (168 lb)

Sport
- Sport: Rowing
- Club: Nereus, Amsterdam
Medal record
Men's rowing
Representing the Netherlands
European Rowing Championships
Silver medal – second place	1963 Copenhagen	Coxed pair

Sjoerd Wartena (born 1 May 1939) is a retired Dutch rower. He competed at the 1964 Summer Olympics in the coxless fours, together with Jim Enters, Herman Boelen and Sipke Castelein, and finished in fourth place. He won a silver medal in the coxed pairs at the 1963 European Championships.

Son of a doctor, Wartena studied literature and worked at a university library in Amsterdam. In the 1970s he moved to a village in southern France, where he learned farming and in 2003 founded the movement Terre de Liens devoted to ecologically friendly agriculture.
