= Jim Enters =

Dutch rower (born 1939)

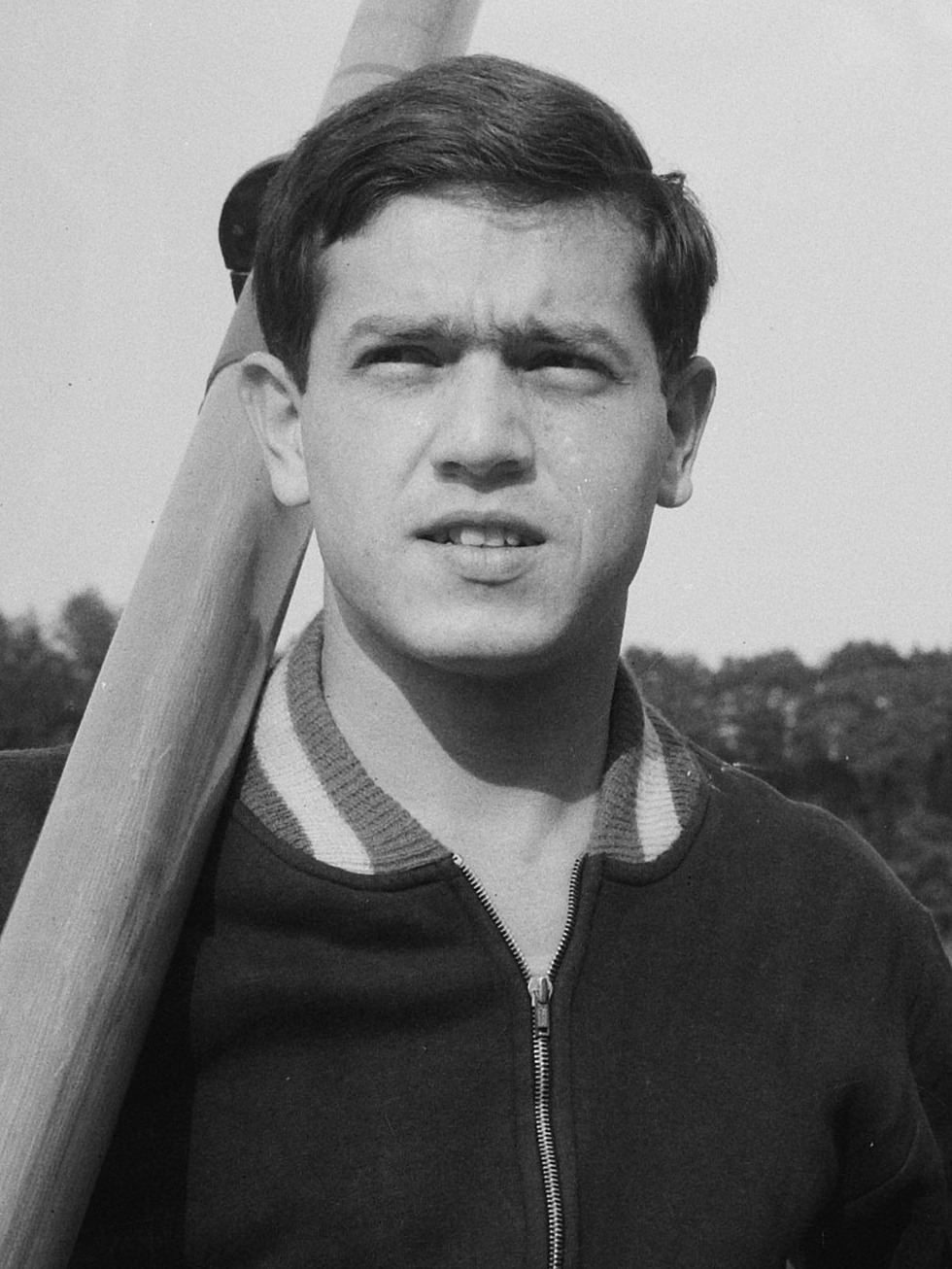
- Enters in 1965

Personal information
- Born: 8 November 1939 (age 86) Palembang, Indonesia
- Height: 1.76 m (5 ft 9 in)
- Weight: 72 kg (159 lb)

Sport
- Sport: Rowing
- Club: Willem III, Amsterdam
Medal record
Men's rowing
Representing the Netherlands
European Rowing Championships
Bronze medal – third place	1963 Copenhagen	Coxless pairs

Jaap "Jim" Enters (born 8 November 1939) is a retired Dutch rower. He competed at the 1964 Summer Olympics in the coxless fours, together with Herman Boelen, Sipke Castelein and Sjoerd Wartena, and finished in fourth place. He won a European bronze in the coxless pairs with Boelen in 1963.
