= Timișoara Astronomical Observatory =

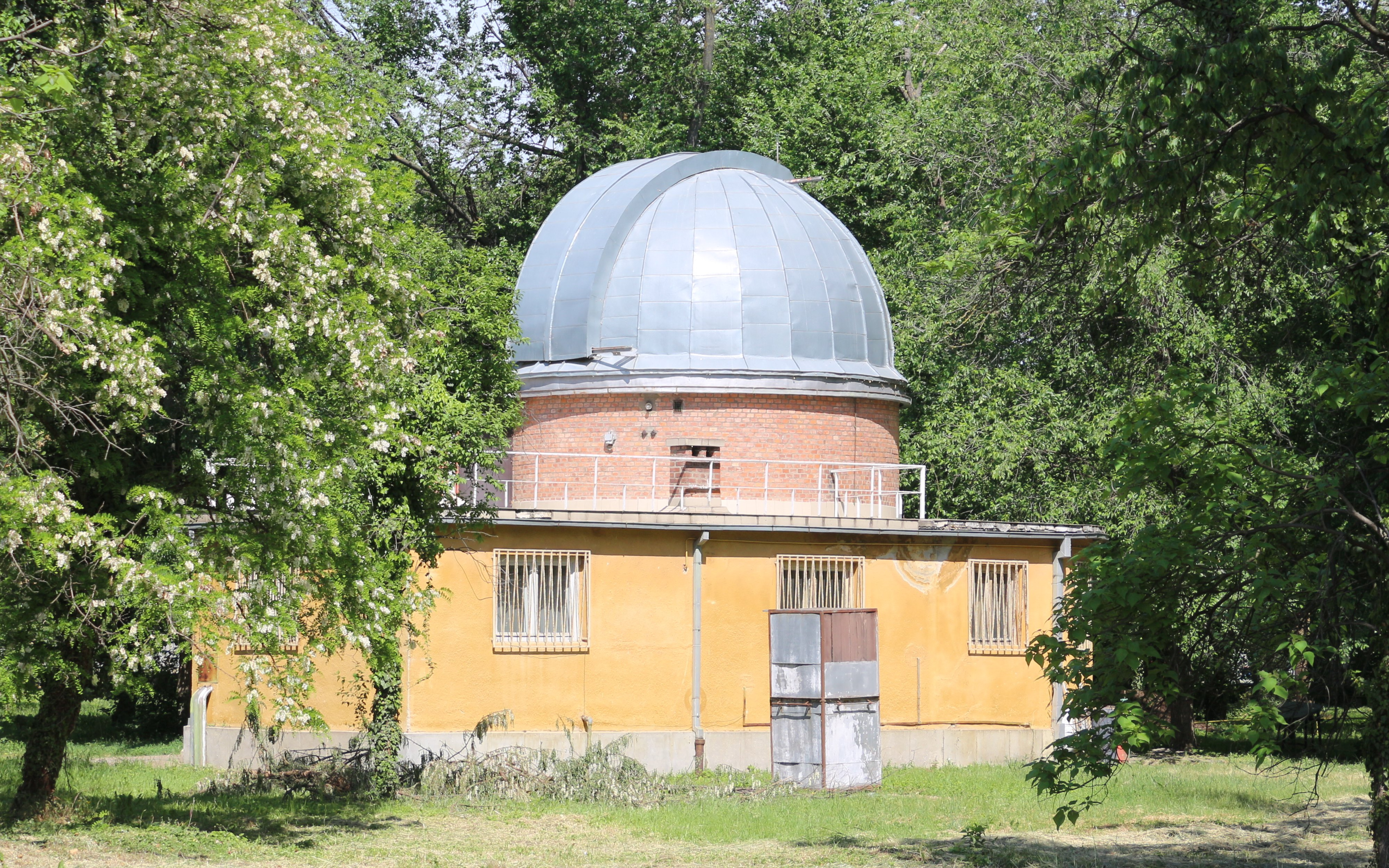
- Organization: Astronomical Institute of the Romanian Academy
- Location: 1 Axente Sever Square, Timișoara
- Coordinates: 45°44′17″N 21°13′49″E
- Established: 7 December 1962

Telescopes
- Cassegrain: 300/1690 mm Zeiss
- Coelostat: 100/2000 mm Zeiss
- Location of Timișoara Astronomical Observatory

Timișoara Astronomical Observatory is a research institute in Timișoara, Romania, founded on 7 December 1962 by Ioan Curea. The scientific activity is coordinated by the Astronomical Institute of the Romanian Academy, and the administrative activity by the local branch of the Romanian Academy.

The Astronomical Observatory building has a basement, a ground floor and the equatorial instrument hall covered with a rotating dome. The dome and the main instrument of the observatory were made with own resources, in Timișoara. The optical instruments placed on the equatorial mount are:

- a Cassegrain telescope with a 300/1690 mm Zeiss mirror equipped with an SBIG CCD camera, used for naked-eye observations and CCD stellar photometry, and
- a 100/2000 mm Zeiss scope.

Due to the development of Timișoara, the pollution and brightness of the night sky has increased, so the location of the observatory is no longer appropriate. It is desired to move it to Muntele Mic in Caraș-Severin County.
