= Bunzo Kimura =

Japanese rower (born 1942)

Personal information
- Nationality: Japanese
- Born: 20 April 1942 (age 83)

Sport
- Sport: Rowing

Bunzo Kimura (木村 文三, Kimura Bunzō, born 20 April 1942) is a Japanese rower. He competed in the men's coxless four event at the 1964 Summer Olympics.
