= Ludovic Covaci-Borbely =

Romanian rower

Personal information
- Nationality: Romanian
- Born: 20 February 1939 (age 86); Timișoara, Romania

Sport
- Sport: Rowing

Ludovic Covaci-Borbely (born 20 February 1939) is a Romanian rower. He competed in the men's coxless four event at the 1964 Summer Olympics.
