= Herman Boelen =

Dutch rower (born 1939)

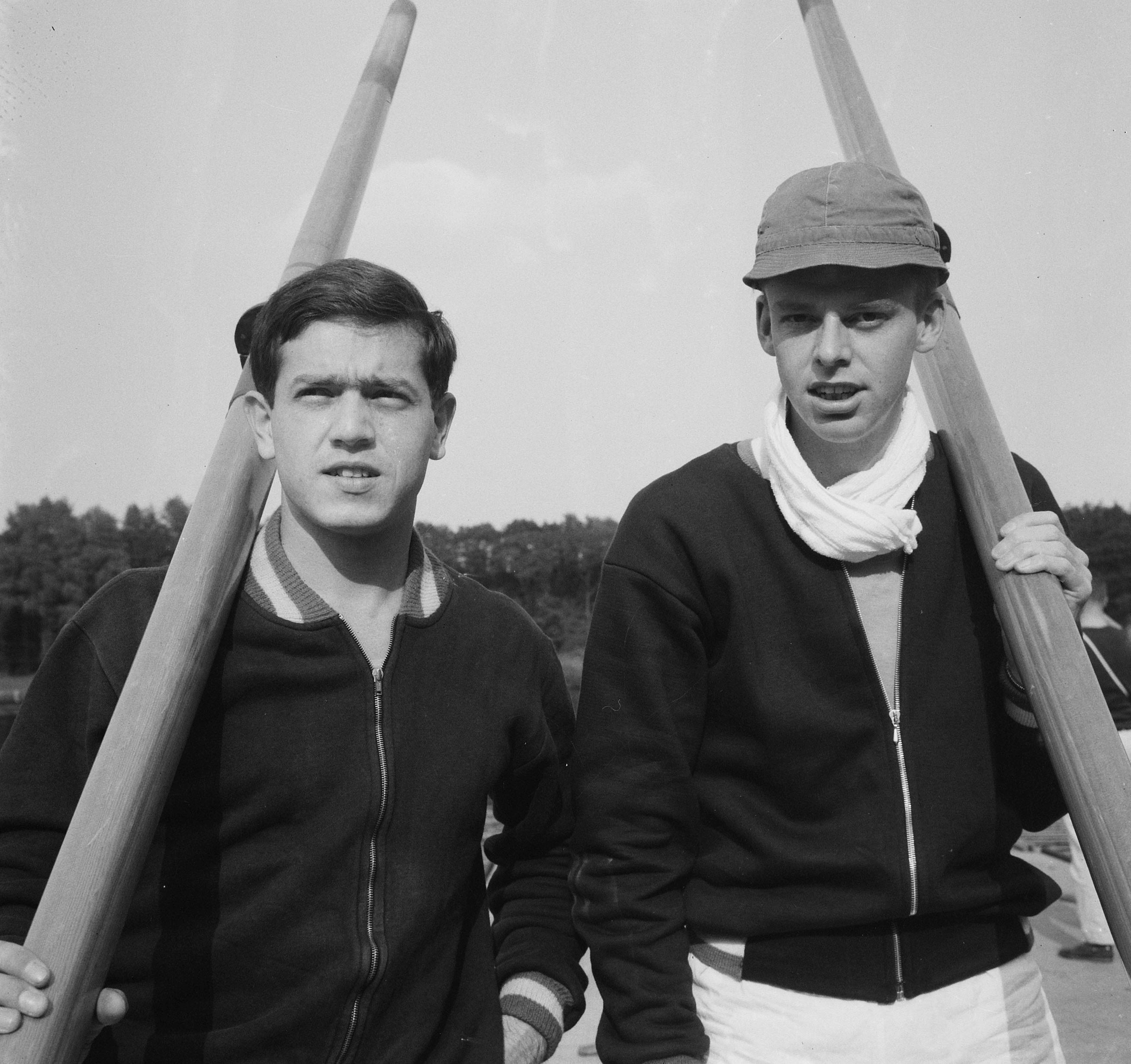
- Jim Enters and Herman Boelen (right) in 1965

Personal information
- Born: 12 May 1939 (age 87) Amsterdam, the Netherlands
- Height: 1.90 m (6 ft 3 in)
- Weight: 76 kg (168 lb)

Sport
- Sport: Rowing
- Club: Willem III, Amsterdam
Medal record
Men's rowing
Representing the Netherlands
European Rowing Championships
Bronze medal – third place	1963 Copenhagen	Coxless pairs

Herman Boelen (born 12 May 1939) is a retired Dutch rower. He competed at the 1964 Summer Olympics in the coxless fours, together with Jim Enters, Sipke Castelein and Sjoerd Wartena, and finished in fourth place. He won a European bronze in the coxless pairs with Enters in 1963.

Boelen's daughter Femke is also an Olympic rower. After retiring from competitions he worked as a rowing coach with the national junior team and as the chairman of his rowing club Willem III in Amsterdam. In 2005 he became Knight of the Order of Orange-Nassau.
