= Eugenijus Levickas =

Soviet rower

Personal information
- Born: 5 April 1941 (age 83); Vepriai, Lithuanian SSR, Soviet Union
- Height: 182 cm (6 ft 0 in)
- Weight: 82 kg (181 lb)

Sport
- Sport: Rowing

Eugenijus Levickas (Russian name: Еугениус Левицкас; born 5 April 1941) is a Soviet rower from Lithuania. He competed at the 1964 Summer Olympics in Tokyo with the men's coxed four where they came seventh.
