= Jonas Motiejūnas (rower) =

Soviet rower (born 1940)

Personal information
- Born: 21 September 1940 (age 84); Panevėžys, Lithuanian SSR, Soviet Union
- Height: 181 cm (5 ft 11 in)
- Weight: 86 kg (190 lb)

Sport
- Sport: Rowing

Jonas Motiejūnas (Russian name: Йонас Матеюнас; born 21 September 1940) is a Soviet rower from Lithuania. He competed at the 1964 Summer Olympics in Tokyo with the men's coxed four where they came seventh.
