= Sipke Castelein =

Dutch rower (born 1941)

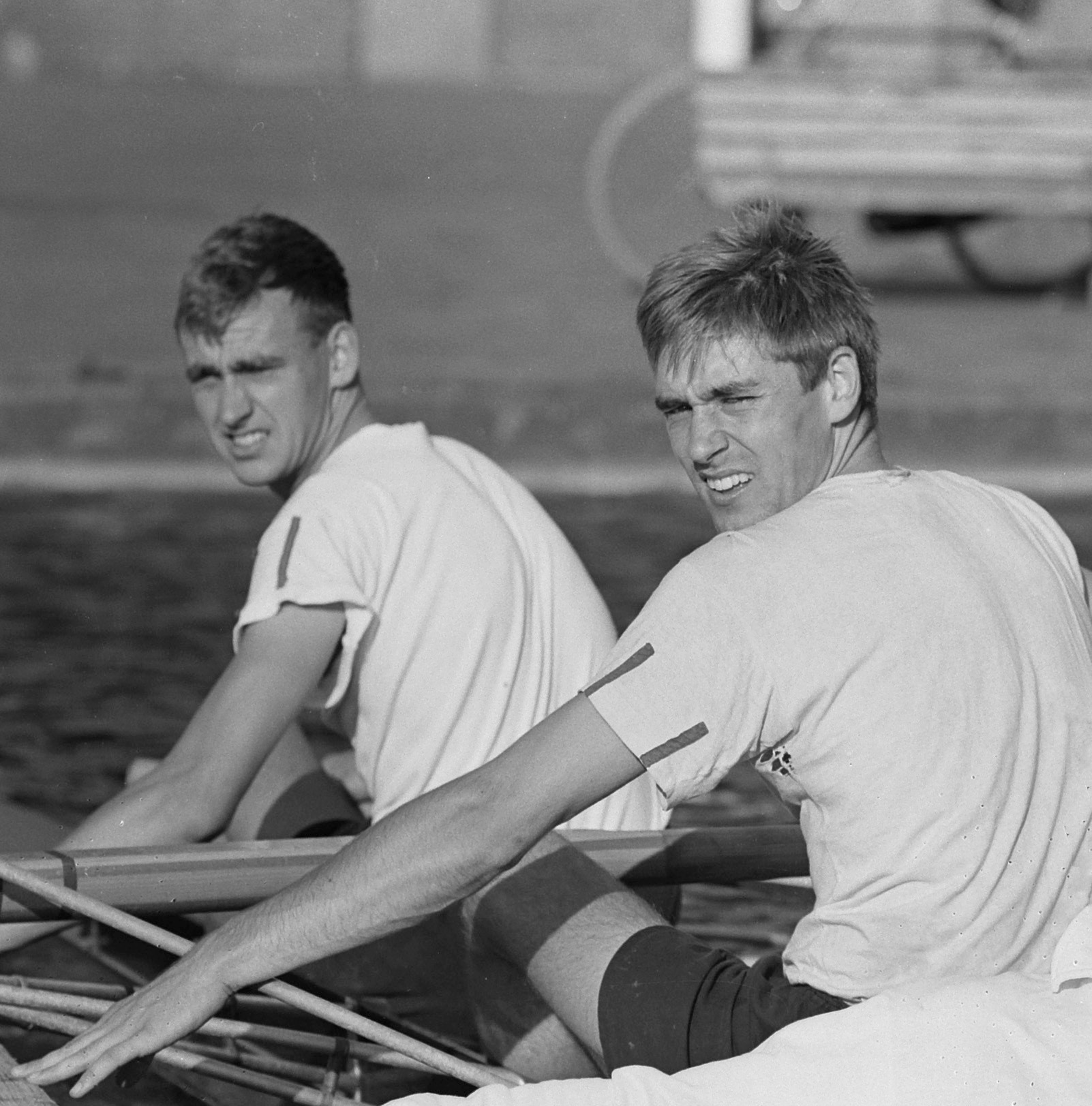
- Castelein (left) and Sjoerd Wartena in 1963

Personal information
- Full name: Sipke Taeke Castelein
- Born: 14 April 1941 (age 85) Workum, the Netherlands
- Height: 1.93 m (6 ft 4 in)
- Weight: 77 kg (170 lb)

Sport
- Sport: Rowing
- Club: Nereus, Amsterdam
Medal record
Men's rowing
Representing the Netherlands
European Rowing Championships
Silver medal – second place	1963 Copenhagen	Coxed pair

Sipke Taeke Castelein (born 14 April 1941) is a retired Dutch rower. He competed at the 1964 Summer Olympics in the coxless fours, together with Jim Enters, Herman Boelen, and Sjoerd Wartena, and finished in fourth place. He won a silver medal in the coxed pair at the 1963 European Championships.
