= William L. Barry =

English rower (born 1940)

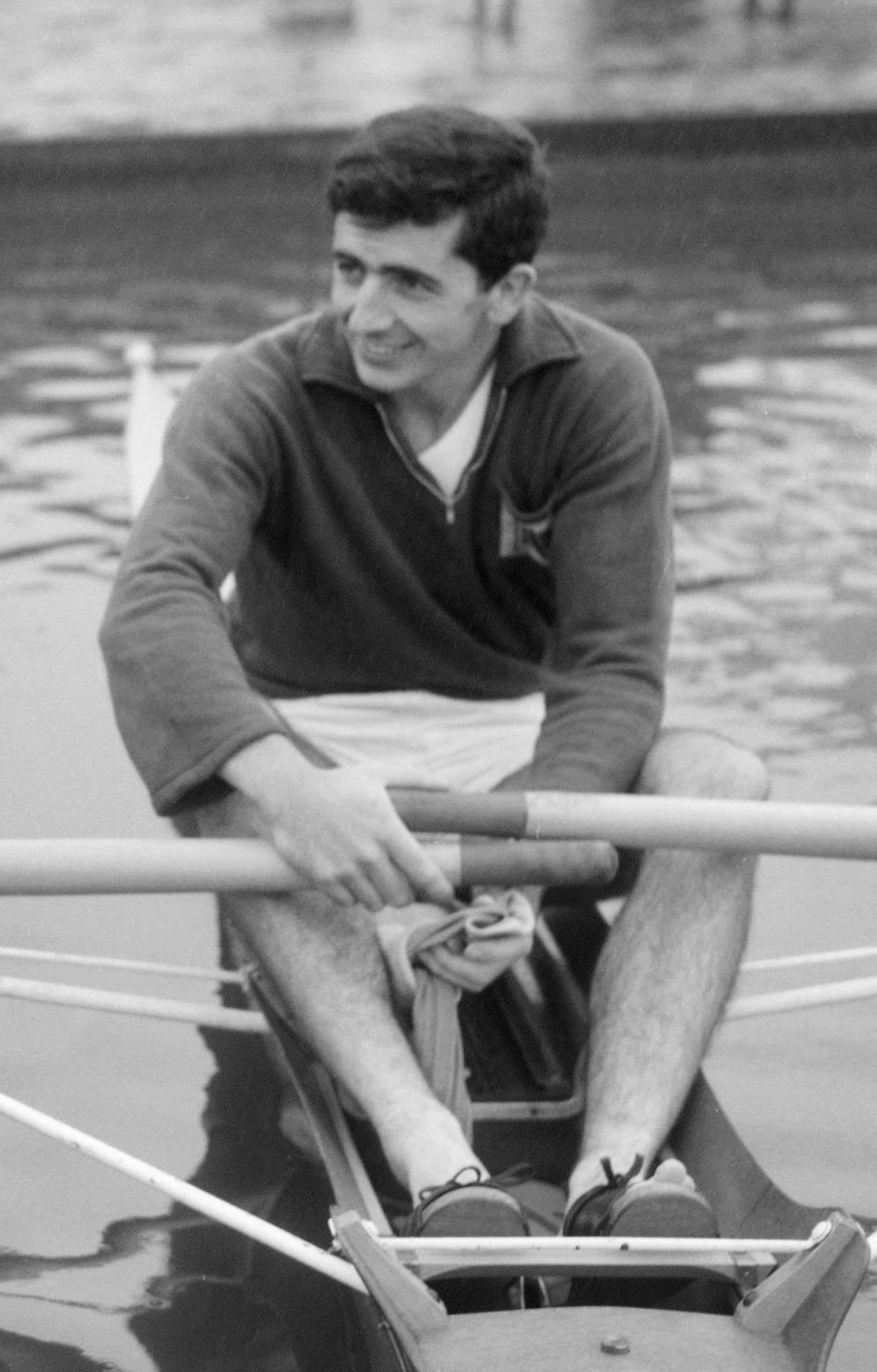
- Barry in 1964

Personal information
- Born: 16 October 1940 (age 85)
- Height: 188 cm (6 ft 2 in)
- Weight: 85 kg (187 lb)

Sport
- Sport: Rowing
- Club: Quintin Boat Club
Medal record
Representing United Kingdom
Olympic Games
Silver medal – second place	1964 Tokyo	Coxless four
Representing England
Commonwealth Games
Silver medal – second place	1962 Perth	Single sculls

William "Bill" Louis Barry (born 16 October 1940) is a retired English rower.

== Rowing career ==
He won a silver medal in the coxless fours at the 1964 Olympics. He also won the Wingfield Sculls in 1963–1966, all in single sculls.

He represented England and won a silver medal in the single sculls at the 1962 British Empire and Commonwealth Games in Perth, Western Australia.

== Coaching ==
Barry was coach to Alan Campbell, who won a bronze medal in the single sculls at the 2012 Olympics. He is also the great-nephew of former world professional champion Ernest Barry.
