= Rowing at the 1964 Summer Olympics – Men's eight =

Men's eight at the Games of the XVIII Olympiad
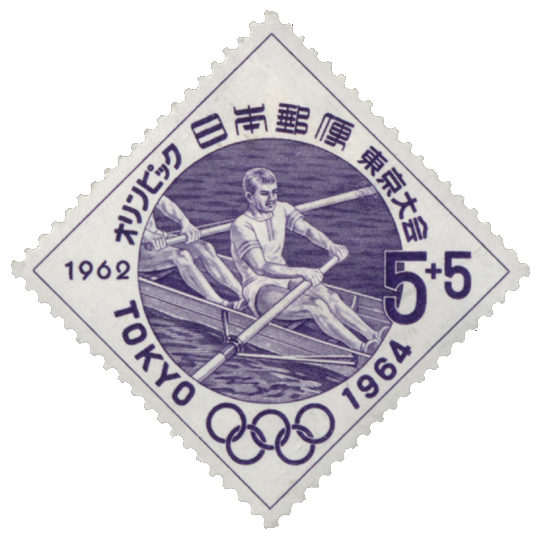
- Japan stamp commemorating rowing at the 1964 Olympics
- Venue: Toda Rowing Course
- Dates: 12–15 October 1964
- Competitors: 126 from 14 nations
- Winning time: 6:18.23

Medalists
1st place, gold medalist(s)		United States: Joseph Amlong; Thomas Amlong; Boyce Budd; Emory Clark; Stanley Cwiklinski; Hugh Foley; Bill Knecht; William Stowe; Róbert Zimonyi (cox)
2nd place, silver medalist(s)		United Team of Germany: Klaus Aeffke; Klaus Bittner; Karl-Heinrich von Groddeck; Hans-Jürgen Wallbrecht; Klaus Behrens; Jürgen Schröder; Jürgen Plagemann; Horst Meyer; Thomas Ahrens (cox)
3rd place, bronze medalist(s)		Czechoslovakia: Petr Čermák; Jiří Lundák; Jan Mrvík; Július Toček; Josef Věntus; Luděk Pojezný; Bohumil Janoušek; Richard Nový; Miroslav Koníček (cox)

The men's eight event was a rowing event conducted as part of the 1964 Summer Olympics programme. It was held from 12 to 15 October at the Toda Rowing Course. There were 14 boats (126 competitors) from 14 nations, with each nation limited to a single boat in the event. The event was won by the United States, returning the top of the podium after losing their eight-Games winning streak with a fifth-place finish in 1960; it was the nation's 11th overall victory in the men's eight. The defending champions, the United Team of Germany, took silver; the Germans defeated the United States in the opening round but lost the rematch in the final after the Americans advanced through the repechage. Czechoslovakia repeated as bronze medalists.

== Background ==
This was the 14th appearance of the event. Rowing had been on the programme in 1896 but was cancelled due to bad weather. The men's eight has been held every time that rowing has been contested, beginning in 1900.

The United States was the dominant nation in the event, with the nation winning eight straight Olympic men's eight competitions from 1920 to 1956 before a surprise fifth-place finish in 1960. This time, the Americans were represented by the Vesper Boat Club. Germany had risen as a power as well—the United Team was the reigning Olympic gold medalist and West Germany had taken silver at the 1961 European Rowing Championships, gold at the 1962 World Rowing Championships, and gold at the 1963 European Rowing Championships. Other significant contenders included Canada (the 1963 Pan American Games champions) and Australia (1962 British Empire and Commonwealth Games winners).

Cuba, Egypt, and South Korea each made their debut in the event. Canada and the United States each made their 12th appearance, tied for most among nations to that point.

== Competition format ==
The "eight" event featured nine-person boats, with eight rowers and a coxswain. It was a sweep rowing event, with the rowers each having one oar (and thus each rowing on one side). This rowing competition consisted of two main rounds (semifinals and finals), as well as a repechage round that allowed teams that did not win their heats to advance to the final. The competition introduced the consolation or "B" final, for ranking boats 7 through 12. The course used the 2000 metres distance that became the Olympic standard in 1912 (with the exception of 1948).

- Semifinals: Three heats. With 14 boats entered, there were four or five boats per heat. The winner of each heat (3 boats) advanced directly to the "A" final; all other boats (11 total) went to the repechage.
- Repechage: Three heats. With 11 boats racing in but not winning their initial heats, there were three or four boats per repechage heat. The top boat in each repechage heat (3 boats) advanced to the "A" final, the 2nd and 3rd place boats in each heat (6 boats) went to the "B" final (out of medal contention), and the remaining 2 boats were eliminated.
- Finals: The "A" final consisted of the six boats that had won either the semifinal heats or the repechage heats, competing for the medals and 4th through 6th place. The "B" final had the 2nd and 3rd place finishers from the repechage heats; they competed for 7th through 12th place.

== Schedule ==
All times are Japan Standard Time (UTC+9)

Date	Time	Round
Monday, 12 October 1964	11:00	Semifinals
Tuesday, 13 October 1964	15:00	Repechage
Wednesday, 14 October 1964	16:00	Final B
Thursday, 15 October 1964	16:30	Final A

== Results ==
=== Semifinals ===
The top crew in each heat advanced to the final, with all others sent to the repechages.

==== Semifinal 1 ====
Rank	Rowers	Coxswain	Nation	Time	Notes
1	Klaus Aeffke; Klaus Bittner; Moritz von Groddeck; Hans-Jürgen Wallbrecht; Klaus Behrens; Jürgen Schröder; Jürgen Plagemann; Horst Meyer	Thomas Ahrens	United Team of Germany	5:54.02	QA
2	Joe Amlong; Tom Amlong; Boyce Budd; Emory Clark; Stan Cwiklinski; Hugh Foley; Bill Knecht; Bill Stowe	Róbert Zimonyi	United States	5:54.30	R
3	Dario Giani; Sergio Tagliapietra; Gianpietro Gilardi; Francesco Glorioso; Pietro Polti; Giuseppe Schiavon; Orlando Savarin; Sereno Brunello	Ivo Stefanoni	Italy	6:02.13	R
4	Boris Klavora; Jadran Barut; Jože Berc; Vjekoslav Skalak; Marko Mandič; Alojz Colja; Pavao Martić; Lucijan Kleva	Zdenko Balaš	Yugoslavia	6:02.43	R
5	David Ramage; David Boykett; Terry Davies; Robert Lachal; Paul Guest; Martin Tomanovits; Brian Vear; Graeme McCall	Kevin Wickham	Australia	6:06.94	R

==== Semifinal 2 ====
Rank	Rowers	Coxswain	Nation	Time	Notes
1	Petr Čermák; Jiří Lundák; Jan Mrvík; Július Toček; Josef Věntus; Luděk Pojezný; Bohumil Janoušek; Richard Nový	Miroslav Koníček	Czechoslovakia	6:03.88	QA
2	Thomas Gray; Max Wieczorek; Richard Bordewick; Eldon Worobieff; Wayne Pretty; John Larsen; Marc Lemieux; Daryl Sturdy	David Overton	Canada	6:07.19	R
3	Naoji Sato; Koichi Miyano; Tsugio Ito; Tsuneo Ogasawara; Yoshihiro Onishi; Shin Hasegawa; Hajime Ishikawa; Ryuzo Kikuchi	Osamu Mandai	Japan	6:16.67	R
4	Mark Brownlee; Lex Clark; Peter Delaney; John Gibbons; George Paterson; Tony Popplewell; Raymond Skinner; Alan Webster	Doug Pulman	New Zealand	6:20.63	R
5	Osvaldo Díaz; Gilberto Campbell; Mario Tabio; Ezequiel Montenegro; Alfredo Hernández; Leovigildo Millan; Norge Marrero; Segundo Mora	Roberto Ojeda	Cuba	6:31.76	R

==== Semifinal 3 ====
Rank	Rowers	Coxswain	Nation	Time	Notes
1	Juozas Jagelavičius; Yury Suslin; Petras Karla; Vytautas Briedis; Volodymyr Sterlik; Zigmas Jukna; Antanas Bagdonavičius; Ričardas Vaitkevičius	Yuriy Lorentsson	Soviet Union	6:06.15	QA
2	André Fevret; Pierre Maddaloni; André Sloth; Joseph Moroni; Robert Dumontois; Jean-Pierre Grimaud; Bernard Meynadier; Michel Viaud	Alain Bouffard	France	6:09.08	R
3	Ali Abdel Sami; Abdel Mohsen Saad; Ibrahim Metwalli; Abdel Latif Metwalli; Ahmed Ibrahim; Ali Abdel Radi; Abdel Fattah Abou-Shanab; Saleh Ibrahim	Abbas Khamis	Egypt	6:32.42	R
4	Lee Sang-u; Kim Heon-jong; Kim Gyu-san; Choi Sin-il; An Jong-deuk; Cheon Seong-tae; Yoo Hyeok-geun; Ji Deok-han	Park Sin-yeong	South Korea	6:46.13	R

==== Repechages ====
The top finisher in each of the three repechages joined the finalists. The second and third-place finishers competed in a consolation final for 7th-12th places. All other crews were eliminated.

==== Repechage heat 1 ====
Rank	Rowers	Coxswain	Nation	Time	Notes
1	Dario Giani; Sergio Tagliapietra; Gianpietro Gilardi; Francesco Glorioso; Pietro Polti; Giuseppe Schiavon; Orlando Savarin; Sereno Brunello	Ivo Stefanoni	Italy	6:03.59	QA
2	André Fevret; Pierre Maddaloni; André Sloth; Joseph Moroni; Robert Dumontois; Jean-Pierre Grimaud; Bernard Meynadier; Michel Viaud	Alain Bouffard	France	6:07.43	QB
3	Mark Brownlee; Lex Clark; Peter Delaney; John Gibbons; George Paterson; Tony Popplewell; Raymond Skinner; Alan Webster	Doug Pulman	New Zealand	6:14.83	QB
4	Osvaldo Díaz; Gilberto Campbell; Mario Tabio; Ezequiel Montenegro; Alfredo Hernández; Leovigildo Millan; Norge Marrero; Segundo Mora	Roberto Ojeda	Cuba	6:27.29	

==== Repechage heat 2 ====
Rank	Rowers	Coxswain	Nation	Time	Notes
1	Joe Amlong; Tom Amlong; Boyce Budd; Emory Clark; Stan Cwiklinski; Hugh Foley; Bill Knecht; Bill Stowe	Róbert Zimonyi	United States	6:01.47	QA
2	Naoji Sato; Koichi Miyano; Tsugio Ito; Tsuneo Ogasawara; Yoshihiro Onishi; Shin Hasegawa; Hajime Ishikawa; Ryuzo Kikuchi	Osamu Mandai	Japan	6:10.15	QB
3	Lee Sang-u; Kim Heon-jong; Kim Gyu-san; Choi Sin-il; An Jong-deuk; Cheon Seong-tae; Yoo Hyeok-geun; Ji Deok-han	Park Sin-yeong	South Korea	6:36.24	QB

==== Repechage heat 3 ====
Rank	Rowers	Coxswain	Nation	Time	Notes
1	Boris Klavora; Jadran Barut; Jože Berc; Vjekoslav Skalak; Marko Mandič; Alojz Colja; Pavao Martić; Lucijan Kleva	Zdenko Balaš	Yugoslavia	5:59.23	QA
2	Thomas Gray; Max Wieczorek; Richard Bordewick; Eldon Worobieff; Wayne Pretty; John Larsen; Marc Lemieux; Daryl Sturdy	David Overton	Canada	6:03.86	QB
3	David Ramage; David Boykett; Terry Davies; Robert Lachal; Paul Guest; Martin Tomanovits; Brian Vear; Graeme McCall	Kevin Wickham	Australia	6:06.24	QB
4	Ali Abdel Sami; Abdel Mohsen Saad; Ibrahim Metwalli; Abdel Latif Metwalli; Ahmed Ibrahim; Ali Abdel Radi; Abdel Fattah Abou-Shanab; Saleh Ibrahim	Abbas Khamis	Egypt	6:19.03	

=== Consolation final ===
The consolation final determined places from 7th to 12th.

Rank	Rowers	Coxswain	Nation	Time
7	André Fevret; Pierre Maddaloni; André Sloth; Joseph Moroni; Robert Dumontois; Jean-Pierre Grimaud; Bernard Meynadier; Michel Viaud	Alain Bouffard	France	5:58.57
8	David Ramage; David Boykett; Terry Davies; Robert Lachal; Paul Guest; Martin Tomanovits; Brian Vear; Graeme McCall	Kevin Wickham	Australia	6:02.21
9	Thomas Gray; Max Wieczorek; Richard Bordewick; Eldon Worobieff; Wayne Pretty; John Larsen; Marc Lemieux; Daryl Sturdy	David Overton	Canada	6:02.69
10	Naoji Sato; Koichi Miyano; Tsugio Ito; Tsuneo Ogasawara; Yoshihiro Onishi; Shin Hasegawa; Hajime Ishikawa; Ryuzo Kikuchi	Osamu Mandai	Japan	6:05.14
11	Mark Brownlee; Lex Clark; Peter Delaney; John Gibbons; George Paterson; Tony Popplewell; Raymond Skinner; Alan Webster	Doug Pulman	New Zealand	6:07.59
12	Lee Sang-u; Kim Heon-jong; Kim Gyu-san; Choi Sin-il; An Jong-deuk; Cheon Seong-tae; Yoo Hyeok-geun; Ji Deok-han	Park Sin-yeong	South Korea	6:31.80

=== Final ===
Rank	Rowers	Coxswain	Nation	Time
1st place, gold medalist(s)	Joe Amlong; Tom Amlong; Boyce Budd; Emory Clark; Stan Cwiklinski; Hugh Foley; Bill Knecht; Bill Stowe	Róbert Zimonyi	United States	6:18.23
2nd place, silver medalist(s)	Klaus Aeffke; Klaus Bittner; Moritz von Groddeck; Hans-Jürgen Wallbrecht; Klaus Behrens; Jürgen Schröder; Jürgen Plagemann; Horst Meyer	Thomas Ahrens	United Team of Germany	6:23.29
3rd place, bronze medalist(s)	Petr Čermák; Jiří Lundák; Jan Mrvík; Július Toček; Josef Věntus; Luděk Pojezný; Bohumil Janoušek; Richard Nový	Miroslav Koníček	Czechoslovakia	6:25.11
4	Boris Klavora; Jadran Barut; Jože Berc; Vjekoslav Skalak; Marko Mandič; Alojz Colja; Pavao Martić; Lucijan Kleva	Zdenko Balaš	Yugoslavia	6:27.15
5	Juozas Jagelavičius; Yury Suslin; Petras Karla; Vytautas Briedis; Volodymyr Sterlik; Zigmas Jukna; Antanas Bagdonavičius; Ričardas Vaitkevičius	Yuriy Lorentsson	Soviet Union	6:30.69
6	Dario Giani; Sergio Tagliapietra; Gianpietro Gilardi; Francesco Glorioso; Pietro Polti; Giuseppe Schiavon; Orlando Savarin; Sereno Brunello	Ivo Stefanoni	Italy	6:42.78

== Sources ==
- Tokyo Organizing Committee (1964). The Games of the XVIII Olympiad: Tokyo 1964, vol. 2.
