= Rowing at the 1964 Summer Olympics =

Coordinates: 35.8031°N 139.6689°E

Rowing at the Games of the XVIII Olympiad
- Venue: Toda Rowing Course
- Dates: 11–15 October 1964
- Competitors: 370 from 27 nations

Rowing at the 1964 Summer Olympics featured seven events, for men only.

Russian Vyacheslav Ivanov of the Soviet Union took his third consecutive gold medal in the single sculls event.

== Medal summary ==
=== Men's events ===
| Games | Gold | Silver | Bronze |
|---|---|---|---|
| single sculls | Vyacheslav Ivanov; Soviet Union | Achim Hill; United Team of Germany | Gottfried Kottmann; Switzerland |
| double sculls | Soviet Union; Oleg Tyurin; Boris Dubrovskiy | United States; Seymour Cromwell; Jim Storm | Czechoslovakia; Vladimír Andrs; Pavel Hofmann |
| coxless pairs | Canada; George Hungerford; Roger Jackson | Netherlands; Steven Blaisse; Ernst Veenemans | United Team of Germany; Michael Schwan; Wolfgang Hottenrott |
| coxed pair | United States; Edward Ferry; Conn Findlay; Kent Mitchell (cox) | France; Jacques Morel; Georges Morel; Jean-Claude Darouy (cox) | Netherlands; Herman Rouwé; Erik Hartsuiker; Jan Just Bos (cox) |
| coxless fours | Denmark; John Hansen; Bjørn Hasløv; Erik Petersen; Kurt Helmudt | Great Britain; John Russell; Hugh Wardell-Yerburgh; William Barry; John James | United States; Geoffrey Picard; Dick Lyon; Ted Mittet; Ted Nash |
| coxed fours | United Team of Germany; Peter Neusel; Bernhard Britting; Joachim Werner; Egbert Hirschfelder; Jürgen Oelke | Italy; Renato Bosatta; Emilio Trivini; Giuseppe Galante; Franco De Pedrina; Giovanni Spinola | Netherlands; Lex Mullink; Jan van de Graaff; Freek van de Graaff; Bobbie van de Graaf; Marius Klumperbeek |
| eights | United States; Joseph Amlong; Thomas Amlong; Boyce Budd; Emory Clark; Stanley Cwiklinski; Hugh Foley; Bill Knecht; William Stowe; Róbert Zimonyi | United Team of Germany; Klaus Aeffke; Klaus Bittner; Karl-Heinrich von Groddeck; Hans-Jürgen Wallbrecht; Klaus Behrens; Jürgen Schröder; Jürgen Plagemann; Horst Meyer; Thomas Ahrens | Czechoslovakia; Petr Čermák; Jiří Lundák; Jan Mrvík; Július Toček; Josef Věntus; Luděk Pojezný; Bohumil Janoušek; Richard Nový; Miroslav Koníček |

== Participating nations ==
A total of 370 rowers from 27 nations competed at the Tokyo Games:

- Argentina (12)
- Australia (26)
- Austria (7)
- Belgium (2)
- Canada (16)
- Cuba (9)
- Czechoslovakia (20)
- Denmark (14)
- Egypt (16)
- Finland (7)
- France (22)
- Great Britain (8)
- United Team of Germany (26)
- Italy (18)
- Japan (26)
- South Korea (9)
- Mexico (3)
- Netherlands (17)
- Norway (5)
- New Zealand (15)
- Poland (11)
- Romania (7)
- Switzerland (8)
- Soviet Union (26)
- United States (25)
- Uruguay (2)
- Yugoslavia (11)

== Medal table ==
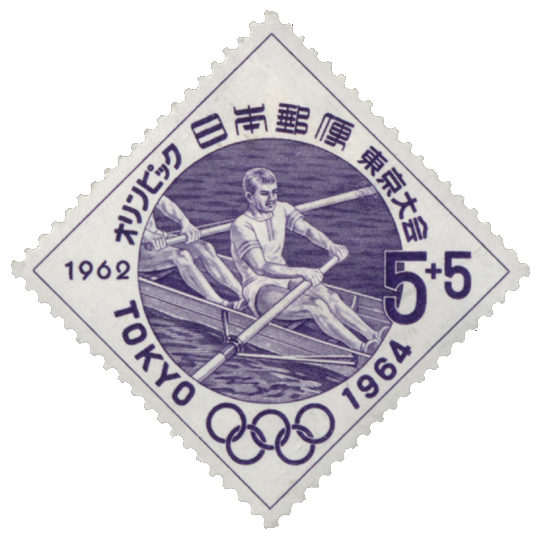
Rowing at the 1964 Summer Olympics on a stamp of Japan

| Rank | Nation | Gold | Silver | Bronze | Total |
|---|---|---|---|---|---|
| 1 | United States | 2 | 1 | 1 | 4 |
| 2 | Soviet Union | 2 | 0 | 0 | 2 |
| 3 | United Team of Germany | 1 | 2 | 1 | 4 |
| 4 | Canada | 1 | 0 | 0 | 1 |
| 4 | Denmark | 1 | 0 | 0 | 1 |
| 6 | Netherlands | 0 | 1 | 2 | 3 |
| 7 | France | 0 | 1 | 0 | 1 |
| 7 | Great Britain | 0 | 1 | 0 | 1 |
| 7 | Italy | 0 | 1 | 0 | 1 |
| 10 | Czechoslovakia | 0 | 0 | 2 | 2 |
| 11 | Switzerland | 0 | 0 | 1 | 1 |
| Totals (11 entries) | | 7 | 7 | 7 | 21 |
