= Yugoslavia at the 1964 Summer Olympics =

- Flag of SFR Yugoslavia
- IOC code: YUG (YUS used at these Games)
- NOC: Yugoslav Olympic Committee

in Tokyo
- Competitors: 75 (72 men, 3 women) in 9 sports
- Flag bearer: Miroslav Cerar
- Medals Ranked 19th: Gold 2 Silver 1 Bronze 2 Total 5

Summer Olympics appearances (overview)
- 1920; 1924; 1928; 1932; 1936; 1948; 1952; 1956; 1960; 1964; 1968; 1972; 1976; 1980; 1984; 1988; 1992; 1996; 2000

Other related appearances
- Serbia (1912, 2008–pres.); Croatia (1992–pres.); Slovenia (1992–pres.); Bosnia and Herzegovina (1992 S–pres.); Independent Olympic Participants (1992 S); North Macedonia (1996–pres.); Serbia and Montenegro (1996–2006); Montenegro (2008–pres.); Kosovo (2016–pres.)

Athletes from Yugoslavia competed at the 1964 Summer Olympics in Tokyo, Japan. This was the country's 10th appearance in the Summer Olympics. Yugoslavia's delegation had 75 competitors (72 men and 3 women), who took part in 32 events in 9 sports.

The youngest athlete was swimmer Slobodan Dijaković, aged 17 years and 100 days at the opening ceremony, and the oldest was gymnast Ivan Čaklec (32 years and 75 days), who competed in his third Olympics. Gymnast Miroslav Cerar was Yugoslavia's flag bearer at the opening ceremony, and went on to become the country's most decorated athlete of the games, winning one gold and one bronze medal.

== Medalists ==
Medal	Name	Sport	Event
Gold	Miroslav Cerar	Gymnastics	Men's pommel horse
Gold	Branislav Simić	Wrestling	Men's Greco-Roman middleweight
Silver	Ozren Bonačić; Zoran Janković; Milan Muškatirović; Ante Nardeli; Frane Nonković; Vinko Rosić; Mirko Sandić; Zlatko Šimenc; Božidar Stanišić; Karlo Stipanić; Ivo Trumbić	Water Polo	Men's team competition
Bronze	Miroslav Cerar	Gymnastics	Men's horizontal bar
Bronze	Branislav Martinović	Wrestling	Men's Greco-Roman featherweight

== Competitors ==
The following is the list of Yugoslav competitors at the 1964 Olympic Games by sport.

Sport	Men	Women	Total
Athletics	6	3	9
Basketball	12	0	12
Canoeing	4	0	4
Football	16	0	16
Gymnastics	6	0	6
Rowing	11	0	11
Swimming	2	0	2
Water polo	11	0	11
Wrestling	4	0	4
Total	72	3	75

== Athletics ==
Key

- Note–Ranks given for track events are within the athlete's heat only
- Q = Qualified for the next round
- q = Qualified for the next round as a fastest loser or, in field events, by position without achieving the qualifying target
- R = Qualified for the repechage round
- NR = National record
- N/A = Round not applicable for the event
- Bye = Athlete not required to compete in round

Track events
Men

Athlete	Event	Heat		Semifinal		Final	
Athlete	Event	Time	Rank	Time	Rank	Time	Rank
Simo Važić	1500 m	3:43.7	5th q	3:48.3	9th	Did not advance	
Franc Červan	5000 m	14:16.6	7th	—N/a		Did not advance	
Simo Važić	5000 m	14:33.8	9th	—N/a		Did not advance	
Franc Červan	10000 m	—N/a				29:21.0	10th
Ðani Kovač	400 m hurdles	DSQ		—N/a		Did not advance	
Slavko Špan	3000 m steeplechase	8:57.6	6th	—N/a		Did not advance	

Women

Athlete	Event	Heat		Semifinal		Final	
Athlete	Event	Time	Rank	Time	Rank	Time	Rank
Gizela Farkaš	800 m	2:08.7	4th	2:09.9	7th	Did not advance	
Draga Stamejčič	80 m hurdles	10.8	4th Q	10.7	3rd Q	10.8	7th

Field events
Men

Athlete	Event	Qualification		Final	
Athlete	Event	Result	Rank	Result	Rank
Roman Lešek	Pole vault	4.60	14= Q	4.70	13th
Dako Radošević	Discus throw	52.71	16th	Did not advance	

Women

Athlete	Event	Qualification		Final	
Athlete	Event	Distance	Position	Distance	Position
Olga Gere	High jump	1.70	8th Q	1.71	7th

Combined event – Women's pentathlon

Athlete	Event	80H	SP	HJ	LJ	200 m	Final	Rank
Draga Stamejčič	Result	10.9	12.73	1.54	6.19	25.2	4790	5th
Draga Stamejčič	Points	1061	904	880	1031	914	4790	5th

== Basketball ==
Summary

Team	Event	Group stage							Class. 5th–8th		
Team	Event	Opposition Score	Opposition Score	Opposition Score	Opposition Score	Opposition Score	Opposition Score	Opposition Score	Opposition Score	Opposition Score	Rank
Yugoslavia men's	Men's tournament	Uruguay; W 84–71	Brazil; L 64–68	Australia; W 74–70	Peru; W 73–64	United States; L 61–69	South Korea; W 99–66	Finland; W 74–45	Italy; L 63–75	Uruguay; W 78–55	7th

Twelve male basketball players represented Yugoslavia:

1964 Yugoslavia men's Olympic basketball team roster
Players
Coaches

Pos.	No.	Name	Age – Date of birth	Height	Club
	4	Slobodan Gordić	27 – 28 September 1937	1.92 m (6 ft 4 in)	OKK Beograd	(Socialist Federal Republic of Yugoslavia)
PF	5	Radivoj Korać	25 – 5 November 1938	1.95 m (6 ft 5 in)	OKK Beograd	(Socialist Federal Republic of Yugoslavia)
C	6	Trajko Rajković	26 – 7 December 1937	2.04 m (6 ft 8 in)	OKK Beograd	(Socialist Federal Republic of Yugoslavia)
	7	Dragan Kovačić	25 – 5 October 1939	1.93 m (6 ft 4 in)	Lokomotiva Zagreb	(Socialist Federal Republic of Yugoslavia)
PG	8	Josip Gjergja	26 – 24 November 1937	1.76 m (5 ft 9 in)	Zadar	(Socialist Federal Republic of Yugoslavia)
	9	Dragoslav Ražnatović	23 – 19 April 1941	1.90 m (6 ft 3 in)	Radnički Belgrade	(Socialist Federal Republic of Yugoslavia)
PG	10	Ivo Daneu	27 – 6 October 1937	1.91 m (6 ft 3 in)	AŠK Olimpija	(Socialist Federal Republic of Yugoslavia)
C	11	Zvonko Petričević	24 – 26 July 1940	2.10 m (6 ft 11 in)	Lokomotiva Zagreb	(Socialist Federal Republic of Yugoslavia)
	12	Vital Eiselt	23 – 6 May 1941	1.87 m (6 ft 2 in)	AŠK Olimpija	(Socialist Federal Republic of Yugoslavia)
F	13	Vladimir Cvetković	23 – 24 May 1941	1.96 m (6 ft 5 in)	Crvena zvezda	(Socialist Federal Republic of Yugoslavia)
PF	14	Nemanja Đurić	28 – 18 June 1936	1.95 m (6 ft 5 in)	Radnički Belgrade	(Socialist Federal Republic of Yugoslavia)
	15	Miodrag Nikolić	26 – 22 August 1938	1.88 m (6 ft 2 in)	OKK Beograd	(Socialist Federal Republic of Yugoslavia)

Head coach

- (Socialist Federal Republic of Yugoslavia) Aleksandar Nikolić

Assistant coach(es)

- (Socialist Federal Republic of Yugoslavia) Ranko Žeravica

Legend

- Club – describes last
  club before the tournament
- Age – describes age
  on 11 October 1964

== Canoeing ==
Men

Athletes	Event	Heat		Semifinal		Final	
Athletes	Event	Time	Rank	Time	Rank	Time	Rank
Dragan Desančić; Aleksandar Kerčov; Vladimir Ignjatijević; Staniša Radmanović	Men's K-4 1000 metres	3:20.30	3rd	3:27.84	2nd	3:19.79	8th

== Football ==
Summary

Team	Event	Group stage		Quarter-final	Class. 5th-8th		
Team	Event	Opposition Score	Opposition Score	Opposition Score	Opposition Score	Opposition Score	Rank
Yugoslavia men's	Men's tournament	Morocco; W 3–1	Hungary; L 5–6	Germany; L 0–1	Japan; W 6–1	Romania; L 0–3	6th

== Rowing ==
Men

Athletes	Event	Semifinal		Repechage		Final	
Athletes	Event	Time	Rank	Time	Rank	Time	Rank
Zdenko Balaš (c); Ante Guberina; Slavko Janjušević	Coxed pair	8:20.33	4th	7:40.89	4th	Did not advance	
Jadran Barut; Jože Berc; Zdenko Balaš (c); Alojz Colja; Boris Klavora; Lucijan Kleva; Marko Mandič; Pavao Martić; Vjekoslav Skalak	Eight	6:02.43	4th	5:59.23	1st	6:27.15	4th

== Swimming ==
Men

Athlete	Event	Heat		Semifinal		Final	
Athlete	Event	Time	Rank	Time	Rank	Time	Rank
Slobodan Dijaković	400 m freestyle	4:41.0	5th	—N/a		Did not advance	
Veljko Rogošić	400 m individual medley	5:11.0	6th	—N/a		Did not advance	
Slobodan Dijaković	1500 m freestyle	18:31.2	6th	—N/a		Did not advance	
Veljko Rogošić	1500 m freestyle	18:05.5	2nd	—N/a		Did not advance	

== Water polo ==
Summary

Team	Event	Group stage			Semifinal round		Final round		
Team	Event	Opposition Score	Opposition Score	Opposition Score	Opposition Score	Opposition Score	Opposition Score	Opposition Score	Rank
Yugoslavia men's	Men's tournament	United States; W 2–1	Netherlands; W 7–2	Brazil; W 8–0	Belgium; W 6–2	Hungary; D 4–4	Soviet Union; W 2–0	Italy; W 2–1	2nd place, silver medalist(s)
