= Amlong =

Amlong is a surname. Notable people with the surname include:

- Gary Amlong (born 1962), American soccer player
- Joseph Amlong (1936–2019), American competition rower and Olympic champion, and later a military officer
- Thomas Amlong (1935–2009), American competition rower and Olympic champion
