= Hasegawa =

Hasegawa (written: 長谷川 literally "long valley river") is a Japanese surname. Hasegawa may refer to:

== People ==
=== A ===
- Akiko Hasegawa, Japanese voice actress and singer
- Akira Hasegawa (1934–2025), Japanese theoretical physicist and engineer
- Ariajasuru Hasegawa (born 1988), Japanese-Iranian footballer

=== B ===
- Bob Hasegawa (born 1952), American-born labor union leader and Washington State congressperson

=== C ===
- Chiyono Hasegawa (1896–2011), Japanese supercentenarian

=== D ===
- Daigo Hasegawa (born 1990), Japanese athlete specialising in the triple jump

=== E ===
- Emi Hasegawa (born 1986), Japanese alpine ski racer

=== H ===
- Haruhisa Hasegawa (born 1957), Japanese football player
- Haruko Hasegawa (1895–1967), Japanese painter
- Hasegawa Katsutoshi (born 1944), Japanese sumo wrestler
- Hasegawa Nyozekan (1875–1969), author
- Hasegawa Tōhaku (1539–1610), Edo period painter
- Hasegawa Yoshimichi (1850–1924), Chief of the Army General Staff
- Hatsunori Hasegawa (born 1955), Japanese actor
- Hirokazu Hasegawa (born 1986), former Japanese football player
- Hiroki Hasegawa (長谷川 博己, born 1977), Japanese actor
- Hiroki Hasegawa (baseball) (長谷川 宙輝, born 1998), Japanese baseball player
- Hozumi Hasegawa (born 1980), Japanese professional boxer

=== I ===
- Ikumi Hasegawa (長谷川 育美), Japanese voice actress
- Itsuko Hasegawa (born 1941), Japanese architect

=== J ===
- Jun Hasegawa (born 1986), Japanese model
- Junya Hasegawa (born 1993), Japanese swimmer

=== K ===
- K-Ske Hasegawa, male Japanese light novelist
- Kaitarō Hasegawa (1900–1935), Japanese novelist
- Kaoru Hasegawa, male Japanese game artist of Spike Chunsoft's affiliation
- Katsuji Hasegawa (born 1946), Japanese professional golfer
- Kazuhiko Hasegawa (1946–2026), Japanese film director
- Kazuo Hasegawa (1908–1984), Japanese actor
- Kazuto Hasegawa (born 1963), Japanese Renju player
- Keiichi Hasegawa (born 1962), Japanese screenwriter
- Keiko Hasegawa (長谷川 恵子; born 1955), Japanese speed skater
- Keizo Hasegawa (長谷川 敬三; 1922–1999), Japanese triple jumper
- Kensei Hasegawa (born 1943), Japanese politician
- Kenta Hasegawa (born 1965), former Japanese international football player
- Kiichi Hasegawa (長谷川 喜一; 1894–1944), Admiral in the Imperial Japanese Navy
- Kiyoshi Hasegawa (admiral) (1883–1970), Japanese admiral and former Governor of Taiwan
- Kiyoshi Hasegawa (artist) (1891–1980), Japanese artist and engraver
- Kyōko Hasegawa (born 1978), Japanese model and actress
- Kohei Hasegawa (born 1984), amateur Japanese Greco-Roman wrestler
- Koki Hasegawa (born 1999), Japanese football player
- Kunihiro Hasegawa, Japanese film director

=== M ===
- Machiko Hasegawa (1920–1992), manga artist, famous for Sazae-san
- Makoto Hasegawa (basketball) (born 1971), Japanese basketball coach and a former player
- Marii Hasegawa (1918–2012), Japanese peace activist
- Mariko Hasegawa (scientist) (born 1952), zoologist, anthropologist, university administrator
- Mitsuru Hasegawa (born 1979), former Japanese football player
- Mizuho Hasegawa (born 2010), Japanese skateboarder

=== N ===
- Nobuhiko Hasegawa (1947–2005), table tennis player

=== R ===
- Rena Hasegawa (長谷川 玲奈; born 2001), Japanese voice actress
- Ryota Hasegawa (長谷川 崚太; born 1993), Japanese rugby union player

=== S ===
- Saburo Hasegawa (1906–1957), Japanese calligrapher and painter
- Sadao Hasegawa (1945–1999), homoerotic artist
- Shigetoshi Hasegawa (born 1968), former Japanese baseball player
- Shin Hasegawa (rowing) (born 1940), Japanese rower
- Shizuka Hasegawa (born 1988), Japanese voice actress
- Sukehiro Hasegawa (born 1942), Japanese academic, educator, author and administrator
- Suzuka Hasegawa (born 2000), Japanese swimmer

=== T ===
- Taichi Hasegawa (born 1981), former Japanese football player
- Taiga Hasegawa (born 2005), Japanese snowboarder
- Takejirō Hasegawa, Japanese book publisher
- Takeshi Hasegawa (長谷川 武; born 1984), Japanese basketball player
- Takumi Hasegawa (basketball) (長谷川 技; born 1989), Japanese basketball player
- Takumi Hasegawa (footballer) (長谷川 巧; born 1998), Japanese footballer
- Taro Hasegawa (born 1979), Japanese football player
- Tatsuo Hasegawa (1916–2008), Japanese automotive engineer
- Tatsuya Hasegawa (born 1994), Japanese football player
- Teru Hasegawa (1912–1947), Japanese Esperantist
- Tomoko Hasegawa-Fukushima (born 1963), Japanese sport shooter
- Toyoki Hasegawa (born 1986), Japanese football player
- Tomoki Hasegawa (born 1957), Japanese composer and arranger of music
- Toru Hasegawa (born 1988), Japanese footballer
- Tsubasa Hasegawa (長谷川 翼; born 1994), Japanese speed skater
- Tsugio Hasegawa (長谷川 次男; 1913–?), Japanese figure skater
- Tsuneo Hasegawa (1947–1991), Japanese mountain climber
- Tsuyoshi Hasegawa (born 1941), Japanese historian

=== Y ===
- Yoshiyuki Hasegawa (born 1969), former Japanese football player
- Yu Hasegawa (born 1987), Japanese footballer
- Yui Hasegawa (born 1997), Japanese football player
- Yūki Hasegawa, professional shogi player
- Yuko Gordon (née Hasegawa, born 1951), Japan-born Hong Kong long-distance runner
- Yuko Hasegawa (curator), Chief Curator of the Museum of Contemporary Art, Tokyo
- Yushi Hasegawa (born 1996), Japanese professional footballer
- Yuya Hasegawa (born 1984), Japanese baseball player

== Fictional characters ==
- Chisame Hasegawa, a character in the manga and anime series Negima! Magister Negi Magi and Negima!?
- Langa Hasegawa, a main character in the anime series SK8 the Infinity.
- Chisato Hasegawa, a character in the manga and anime series The Testament of Sister New Devil
- Kobato Hasegawa, a character and the younger sister of the main character in the light novel and anime series Boku wa Tomodachi ga Sukunai
- Kodaka Hasegawa, a main character in the light novel and anime series Boku wa Tomodachi ga Sukunai
- Sora Hasegawa, a character in the manga and anime series Oh My Goddess!
- Subaru Hasegawa, a main character in the light novel and anime series Ro-Kyu-Bu!
- Taizo Hasegawa, a character in the manga and anime series Gin Tama
- Hasegawa, a character in the 1981 movie Enter the Ninja
- Zenkichi Hasegawa, a major character in the video game Persona 5 Strikers
- Koichi Hasegawa, a name a Golden Kamuy's antagonist, Tokushirou Tsurumi, used while being a spy in Russia

== Other uses ==
- T. Hasegawa Co., Ltd., major producer of flavors and fragrances headquartered in Japan
- Hasegawa school, style of Japanese painting founded in the 16th century by Hasegawa Tōhaku
- Hasegawa–Mima equation, formula for describing the electric potential profile and plasma turbulence in a tokamak magnetic field
- Hasegawa Machiko Art Museum, art museum in Setagaya, Tokyo, Japan
- 3227 Hasegawa, minor planet discovered on February 24, 1928, in Heidelberg
