= Tsuneo =

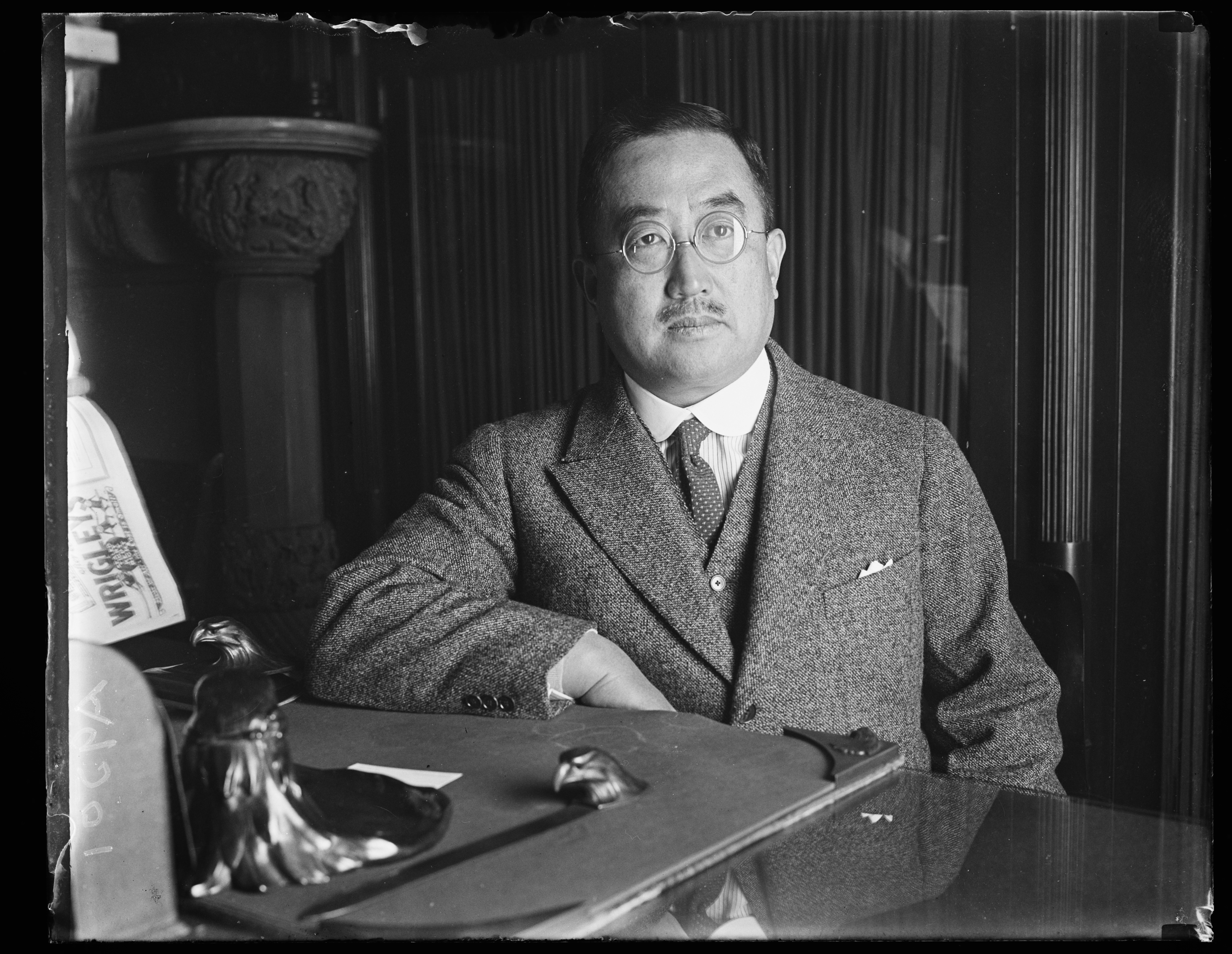
- Tsuneo Matsudaira (1877–1949), Japanese diplomat
- Pronunciation: tsɯneo (IPA)
- Gender: Male

Origin
- Origin: Japanese
- Meaning: Different meanings depending on the kanji used

Other names
- Alternative spelling: Tuneo (Kunrei-shiki) Tuneo (Nihon-shiki) Tsuneo (Hepburn)

Tsuneo is a masculine Japanese given name.

== Written forms ==
Tsuneo can be written using different combinations of kanji characters. Here are some examples:

- 常雄, "usual, masculine"
- 常男, "usual, man"
- 常夫, "usual, husband"
- 恒雄, "always, masculine"
- 恒男, "always, man"
- 恒夫, "always, husband"
- 庸雄, "common, masculine"
- 庸男, "common, man"
- 庸夫, "common, husband"
- 毎雄, "every, masculine"
- 毎男, "every, man"
- 毎夫, "every, husband"

The name can also be written in hiragana つねお or katakana ツネオ.

== Notable people with the name ==
- Tsuneo Ando (安藤 毎夫, born 1956), Japanese aikidoka
- Tsuneo Enari (江成 常夫; born 1936), Japanese photographer
- Tsuneo Gōda (合田 経郎; born 1967), Japanese animator
- Tsuneo Horiuchi (堀内 恒夫; born 1948), Japanese baseball player
- Tsuneo Imahori (今堀 恒雄; born 1962), Japanese musician
- Tsuneo Kanemitsu (金光 庸夫; 1877–1955), Japanese businessman and politician
- Tsuneo Kobayashi (小林 常夫; born 1965), Japanese anime director
- Tsuneo Kusunoki (楠 恒男; born 1947), Japanese businessman
- Tsuneo Maeda (前田 庸生; born 1946), Japanese anime director
- Tsuneo Matsudaira (松平 恒雄; 1877–1949), Japanese diplomat
- Tsuneo Mori (森 恒夫; 1944–1973), Japanese communist and activist
- Tsuneo Nakahara (中原 恒雄; born 1930), Japanese electrical engineer
- Tsuneo Niijima (新島 恒男; born 1955), Japanese astronomer
- Tsuneo Ogasawara (小笠原 恒夫; born 1942), Japanese rower
- Tsuneo Sato (佐藤 恒夫; born 1925), Japanese speed skater
- Tsuneo Shibahara (柴原 恒雄; born 1917), Japanese diver
- Tsuneo Suzuki (鈴木 恒夫; born 1941), Japanese politician
- Tsuneo Nishioka (西岡 常夫; born 1924), Japanese jojutsuka
- Tsuneo Tamagawa (玉河 恒夫; born 1925), Japanese mathematician
- Tsuneo Tanaka (田中 常雄; born 1930), Japanese diplomat
- Tsuneo Watanabe (渡邉 恒雄; 1926–2024), Japanese businessman
- Tsuneo Hasegawa (長谷川 恒男; born 1947), Japanese alpinist
