= David Overton =

David Overton may refer to:

- David M. Overton (born 1946), founder and chief executive officer of the Cheesecake Factory, Inc.
- David Overton (rowing) (born 1943), Canadian rower
