= Shin-young =

- Hangul: 신영
- RR: Sinyeong
- MR: Sinyŏng

Shin-young, also spelled Shin-yong or Sin-young, is a Korean given name.

People with this name include:

- Lho Shin-yong (born 1930), South Korean male politician, Prime Minister from 1985 to 1987
- Park Sin-yeong (born 1942), South Korean male rower
- Kang Sin-young (born 1977), South Korean female judo practitioner
- Kim Shin-young (footballer) (born 1983), South Korean male football striker (J League, K-League Classic)
- Jang Shin-young (born 1984), South Korean actress
- Kim Shin-young (born 1984), South Korean female comedian and TV host
- Yoon Sin-young (born 1987), South Korean male football defender (J2 League)
- Yang Shin-young (born 1990), South Korean female short track skater
- Bae Shin-young (born 1992), South Korean male football striker (K-League Challenge)

Fictional characters with this name include:

- Lee Shin-young, in 2010 South Korean television series The Woman Who Still Wants to Marry

== See also ==
- List of Korean given names
