= Naoji =

- Gender: Male

Origin
- Origin: Japanese
- Meaning: Different meanings depending on the kanji used

Naoji (written: 直司 or 直治) is a masculine Japanese given name. Notable people with the name include:

- Naoji Doi, Imperial Japanese Navy admiral
- Naoji Ito (伊藤 直司; born 1959), Japanese footballer
- Naoji Sato (佐藤 直司; born 1942), Japanese rower
