= Abdel Latif Metwalli =

Egyptian rower

Personal information
- Nationality: Egyptian
- Born: 17 March 1936 (age 90)

Sport
- Sport: Rowing

Abdel Latif Metwalli (born 17 March 1936) is an Egyptian rower. He competed in the men's eight event at the 1964 Summer Olympics in Tokyo.

His team competed in a heat and repechage in the first round (semi finals) of the Men's Coxed Eight competition however the team finished fourth and did not progress to the final or consolation final, this was the first time a consolation final was held. The medals were eventually won by the United States, Germany and Czechoslovakia.

Of the fourteen entrants, only Egypt and Cuba were left out of finals, with 6 boats (shells) competing in each final, despite finishing in a faster time than South Korea in both the semi-finals and repechage.
