= Lee Sang-woo (disambiguation) =

Lee Sang-woo (born 1980) is a South Korean actor.

Lee Sang-woo may also refer to:

- Lee Sang-u (born 1943), South Korean rower
- Yi Sang-woo (born 1951), South Korean film director
- Lee Sang-woo (director) (born 1971), South Korean film director
