= Miyano =

Miyano (written: 宮野) is a Japanese surname. Notable people with the surname include:

- Koichi Miyano (宮野 洪一, born 1942), Japanese rower
- Leland Miyano, artist, landscape designer and author born and raised in Hawai'i
- Mamoru Miyano (born 1983), Japanese voice actor, actor, and singer
- Satoru Miyano (宮野 悟, born 1954), Japanese bioinformatician
- Tomochika Miyano, Japanese manga artist
- Zenjiro Miyano, World War II flying ace

== See also ==
- Miyano-oku Station, a tram station in Kōchi, Kōchi Prefecture, Japan
