= Kleva =

Kleva is a surname. Notable people with the surname include:

- Amedeo Kleva (1923–1996), Italian footballer
- Lucijan Kleva (1942–2009), Slovenian rower
- Mojca Kleva (born 1976), Slovenian political scientist and politician
