= Kevin Wickham =

Kevin Wickham may refer to:

- Kevin Wickham (cricketer) (born 2003), West Indian cricketer
- Kevin Wickham (rower) (1939–2020), Australian representative rowing coxswain
