= Stanley Cwiklinski =

American rower (born 1943)

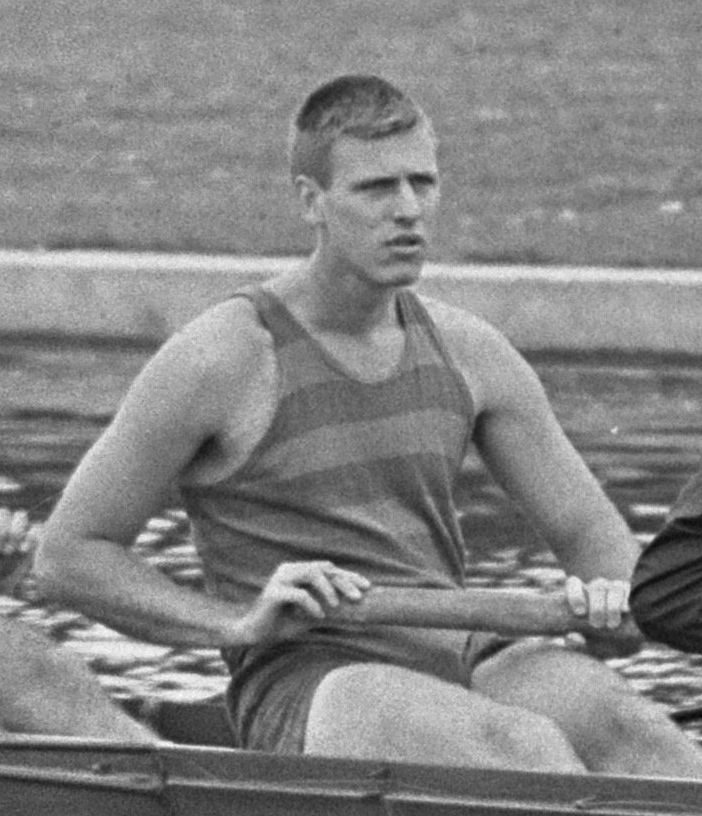
- Cwiklinski at the 1964 European Championships

Personal information
- Born: July 25, 1943 (age 83) New Orleans, Louisiana, U.S.
- Height: 189 cm (6 ft 2 in)
- Weight: 86 kg (190 lb)

Sport
- Sport: Rowing
- Club: Fairmount Rowing Association; Vesper Boat Club
Medal record
Men's rowing
Representing the United States
Olympic Games
Gold medal – first place	1964 Tokyo	Eight
European Rowing Championships
Bronze medal – third place	1965 Duisburg	Eight

Stanley Francis "Stan" Cwiklinski (pronounced "quick-LIN-skee", born July 25, 1943) is an American former rower. Competing in the eights he won an Olympic gold medal in 1964 and a bronze at the 1965 European Championship.

Cwiklinski took up rowing at La Salle University, where he was teammates with Hugh Foley, and studied zoology. In 1963, he joined the Vesper Boat Club. He was a career naval officer specializing in marine salvage.

== Cited sources ==
- William A Stowe (2005). All Together. iUniverse. ISBN 978-0-595-34388-1.
