= Gianpietro Gilardi =

Italian rower

Personal information
- Born: 11 January 1938 (age 88) Mandello del Lario, Italy
- Height: 177 cm (5 ft 10 in)
- Weight: 79 kg (174 lb)

Sport
- Sport: Rowing
Medal record
Men's rowing
Representing Italy
European Rowing Championships
Gold medal – first place	1961 Prague	Eight

Gianpietro Gilardi (born 11 January 1938) is an Italian rower. He competed at the 1964 Summer Olympics in Tokyo with the men's eight where they came sixth.
