= Pietro Polti =

Italian rower

Personal information
- Nationality: Italian
- Born: 20 June 1941 (age 83); Vercana, Italy

Sport
- Sport: Rowing

Pietro Polti (born 20 June 1941) is an Italian rower. He competed in the men's eight event at the 1964 Summer Olympics.
