= Emory Clark =

American rower (born 1938)

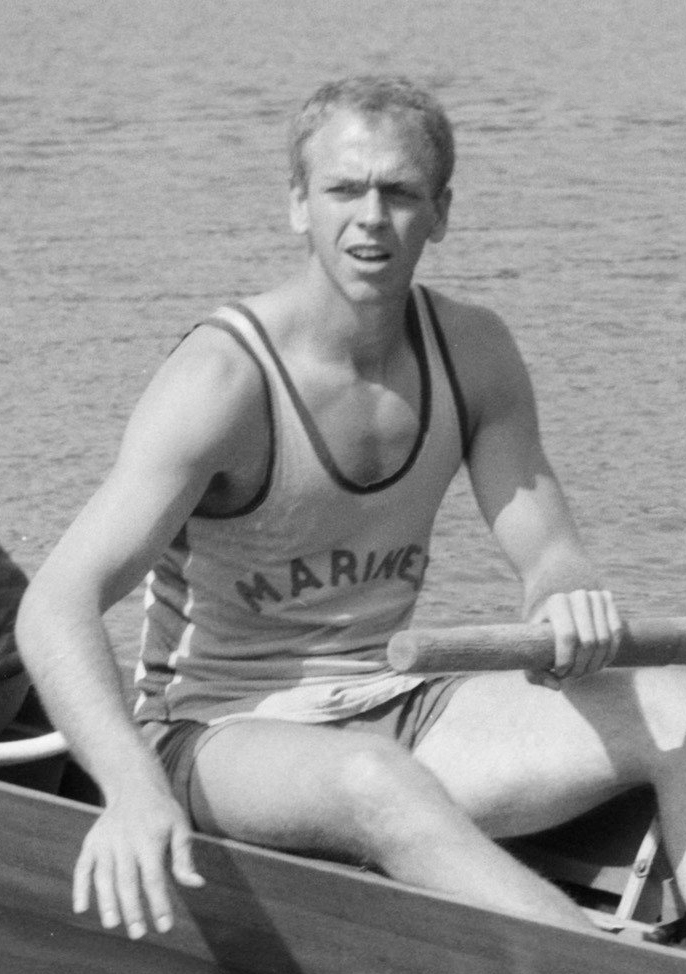
- Clark at the 1964 European Championships

Personal information
- Full name: Emory Wendell Clark II
- Born: March 23, 1938 (age 88) Detroit, Michigan, U.S.
- Height: 193 cm (6 ft 4 in)
- Weight: 91 kg (201 lb)

Sport
- Sport: Rowing
- Club: Vesper Boat Club
Medal record
Men's rowing
Representing the United States
Olympic Games
Gold medal – first place	1964 Tokyo	Eight

Emory Wendell Clark II (born March 23, 1938) is a retired American rower who won a gold medal in the eights at the 1964 Olympics.

Clark began his rowing career at Groton School on the Nashua River in Massachusetts in 1951. During his fifth and sixth years there, he rowed in two (almost) undefeated A boats and has been inducted into the Groton School Athletic Hall of Fame. Clark then went to Yale University in 1956, where he joined Delta Kappa Epsilon (DKE) Fraternity; he graduated in 1960 in English literature. At Yale, he paired with Groton classmate Sam Lambert, and they did not lose a race for two years.

Between 1961 and 1964, Clark served with the United States Marine Corps, spending 13 months in the Orient. In 1964, he joined Philadelphia’s Vesper Boat Club, where he rowed in the eight assembled by Jack Kelly (Grace Kelly’s brother). The team won the Olympic trials, beating a favored Harvard eight. Representing the United States, they went to Tokyo for the 1964 Olympic Games where, after losing in the first heat by 0.28 seconds to the Ratzeburg crew (undefeated in four years), Clark’s boat came from behind to beat the German eight in the final for the gold medal.

Following the Olympics, Clark joined up again with John Higginson and, with two other vintage oarsmen, raced in veterans’ regattas around the world for 25 years. He retired from competitive rowing in 2005, having been inducted into the US Rowing Hall of Fame in 1965.

A 1971 graduate of the University of Michigan Law School, Clark practiced law for 34 years in the area around Metamora, Michigan. He lived most of his life on the family farm there, together with wife Christina and daughter Lucy. He was an avid fisherman, practicing his skills both in the U.S. and abroad. He also competed in masters rowing, and won a world title in the fours in Montreal.

== Bibliography ==
- Emory Clark (2014). Olympic Odyssey. Taylor Butterfield. ISBN 978-0578151885.
- William A Stowe (2005). All Together. iUniverse. ISBN 978-0-595-34388-1.
