= Eldon Worobieff =

Canadian rower (1939–2013)

Personal information
- Nationality: Canadian
- Born: May 17, 1939
- Died: February 1, 2013 (aged 73); Panama City, Panama

Sport
- Sport: Rowing

Eldon Worobieff (May 17, 1939 – February 1, 2013) was a Canadian rower. He competed in the men's eight event at the 1964 Summer Olympics.
