= Ezequiel Montenegro =

Cuban rower

Personal information
- Full name: Ezequiel Montenegro Menendez
- Nationality: Cuban
- Born: 10 April 1942 (age 82)

Sport
- Sport: Rowing

Ezequiel Montenegro (born 10 April 1942) is a Cuban rower. He competed in the men's eight event at the 1964 Summer Olympics.
