= Pierre Maddaloni =

French rower

Personal information
- Nationality: French
- Born: 23 June 1941 (age 83)

Sport
- Sport: Rowing

Pierre Maddaloni (born 23 June 1941) is a French rower. He competed in the men's eight event at the 1964 Summer Olympics.
