= William Stowe (rower) =

American rower

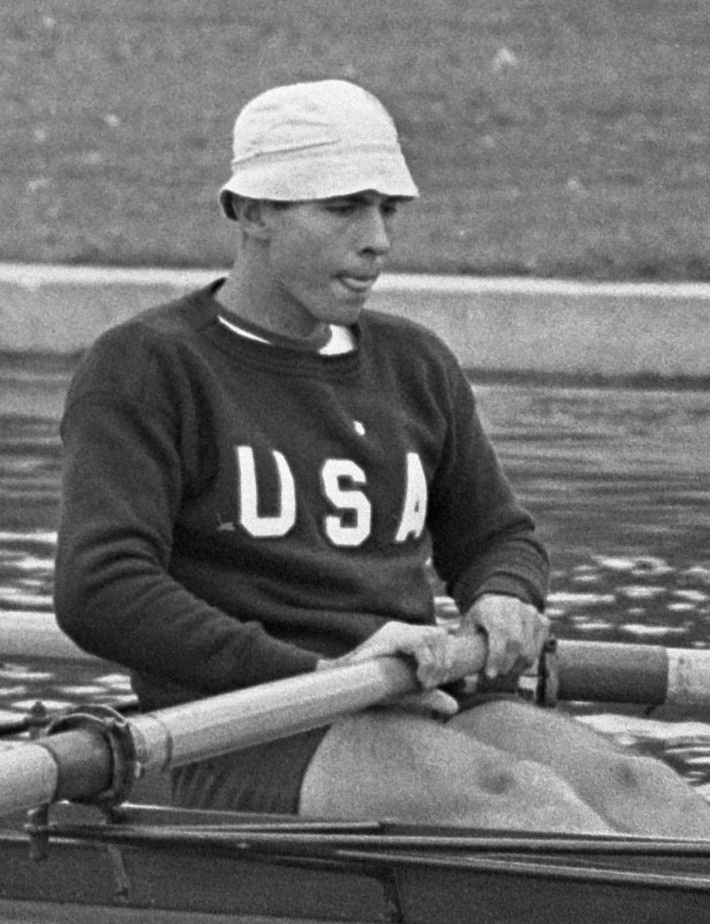
- Stowe at the 1964 European Championships

Personal information
- Born: March 23, 1940 Oak Park, Illinois, U.S.
- Died: February 8, 2016 (aged 75)
- Height: 191 cm (6 ft 3 in)
- Weight: 89 kg (196 lb)

Sport
- Sport: Rowing
- Club: Vesper Boat Club
Medal record
Representing the United States
Olympic Games
Gold medal – first place	1964 Tokyo	Eight
Pan American Games
Gold medal – first place	1967 Winnipeg	Four
European Rowing Championships
Bronze medal – third place	1965 Duisburg	Eight

William Arthur "Bill" Stowe (March 23, 1940 – February 8, 2016) was an American rowing stroke. He won gold medals at the 1964 Olympics and 1967 Pan American Games, and a bronze medal at the 1965 European championships.

== Early life ==
Stowe was born in Oak Park, Illinois. He graduated from Kent School in 1958 and Cornell University, class of 1962. After that he joined the U.S. Navy and was dispatched to Vietnam, where he rowed at the Club Nautique in Saigon. He returned from Vietnam as a lieutenant, and was stationed in Philadelphia, where he joined the Vesper Boat Club.

== Later life ==
Stowe was the crew coach of Columbia University from 1967 to 1971 when he went to the U.S. Coast Guard Academy to start the rowing program there. He was also the "color" commentator for ABC during the 1968 and 1972 Olympic Games. Stowe wrote of his eight's experience in the 1964 Summer Olympics in the book All Together (2005). In his final years, Stowe lived at the Olympic Village of Lake Placid, New York. In 2011 he received the Jack Kelly Award.
