= 1963 European Rowing Championships (men) =

- Venue: Lake Bagsværd
- Location: Copenhagen, Denmark
- Dates: 14–18 August 1963

The 1963 European Rowing Championships for men were rowing championships held on Lake Bagsværd near the Danish capital Copenhagen; the competition for women was held the following month in Moscow. The regatta in Copenhagen was held from 14 to 18 August.

== German participation ==
The rowing federations of East and West Germany met at the end of July in Hanover to discuss how their rowers should be represented. FISA did not recognise East Germany as a country and insisted on one German team per boat class. The negotiations were overshadowed by political tension—the Berlin Wall had been built two years earlier—and did not result in an agreement. The decision was thus made by FISA that selection trials for men were to be held at the Olympic regatta course in Grünau in East Berlin on 9 August. The West German rowers won the races in all seven boat classes. The closest result was the photo finish of the coxless pair, where the West German team was 0.05 seconds ahead.

At a FISA meeting held in conjunction with the 1963 regatta, the East German rowing association asked for separate German teams to be allowed to compete in future. The vote on the item was 37 against and 15 in favour of the proposal, and the motion was thus rejected.

== Medal summary – men's events ==
The finals were held during heavy rain. In the single sculls, the inaugural world champion, Vyacheslav Ivanov, came fourth. Medallists at the 1963 European Rowing Championships for men were:

| Event | Gold | | Silver | | Bronze | |
|---|---|---|---|---|---|---|
| Event | Country & rowers | Time | Country & rowers | Time | Country & rowers | Time |
| M1x | Czechoslovakia; Václav Kozák | 7:11.84 | Netherlands; Rob Groen | 7:14.22 | West Germany; Helmut Lebert | 7:19.47 |
| M2x | Czechoslovakia; Vladimír Andrs; Pavel Hofmann | 6:43.54 | United States; Seymour Cromwell; Donald Spero | 6:47.06 | Soviet Union; Oleg Tyurin; Boris Dubrovskiy | 6:52.78 |
| M2- | Italy; Mario Petri; Paolo Mosetti | 6:53.28 | West Germany; Günther Zumkeller; Dieter Bender | 6:55.34 | Netherlands; Jim Enters; Herman Boelen | 6:57.50 |
| M2+ | West Germany; Klaus-Günter Jordan; Wolfgang Neuß; Frank Steinhäuser (cox) | 7:21.70 | Netherlands; Sipke Castelein; Sjoerd Wartena; E. de Voogd (cox) | 7:30.08 | Romania; Ionel Petrov; Gheorghe Riefelt; Oprea Păunescu (cox) | 7:33.31 |
| M4- | West Germany; Gerd Wolter; Klaus Bittner; Egon Böttcher; Christian Prey | 6:13.88 | Italy; Romano Sgheiz; Fulvio Balatti; Giovanni Zucchi; Luciano Sgheiz | 6:16.53 | France; André Fevret; Roger Chatelain; Philippe Malivoire; Jean-Pierre Drivet | 6:11.97 |
| M4+ | West Germany; Peter Neusel; Bernhard Britting; Joachim Werner; Egbert Hirschfelder; Jürgen Oelke (cox) | 6:29.60 | Czechoslovakia; Karel Karafiát; René Líbal; Jaroslav Starosta; Jan Štefan; Ivan Papirnik (cox) | 6:33.81 | Soviet Union; Yevgeny Levitskas; Romas Levitskas; Celistinas Jutcis; Povilas Lutkattis; Igor Rudakov (cox) | 6:37.92 |
| M8+ | West Germany; Bernd Kruse; Ingo Kliefoth; Karl-Heinrich von Groddeck; Hans-Jürgen Wallbrecht; Klaus Behrens; Klaus Aeffke; Jürgen Plagemann; Horst Meyer; Thomas Ahrens (cox) | 6:04.19 | Soviet Union; Juozas Jagelavičius; Vytautas Briedis; Petras Karla; Volodymyr Sterlik; Yury Suslin; Zigmas Jukna; Antanas Bagdonavičius; Ričardas Vaitkevičius; Yuriy Lorentsson (cox) | 6:07.98 | Czechoslovakia; Oldřich Tikal; Bohumil Janoušek; Jiří Lundák; Jan Mrvík; Otakar Mareček; Richard Nový; Josef Věntus; Luděk Pojezný; Miroslav Koníček (cox) | 6:13.94 |

== Medals table ==
| Rank | Nation | Gold | Silver | Bronze | Total |
|---|---|---|---|---|---|
| 1 | West Germany (FRG) | 4 | 1 | 1 | 6 |
| 2 | Czechoslovakia (TCH) | 2 | 1 | 1 | 4 |
| 3 | Italy (ITA) | 1 | 1 | 0 | 2 |
| 4 | Netherlands (NED) | 0 | 2 | 1 | 3 |
| 5 | Soviet Union (URS) | 0 | 1 | 2 | 3 |
| 6 | United States (USA) | 0 | 1 | 0 | 1 |
| 7 | France (FRA) | 0 | 0 | 1 | 1 |
| 7 | Romania (ROM) | 0 | 0 | 1 | 1 |
| Totals (8 entries) | | 7 | 7 | 7 | 21 |
