= Miroslav Koníček =

Czech rower (1936–2026)

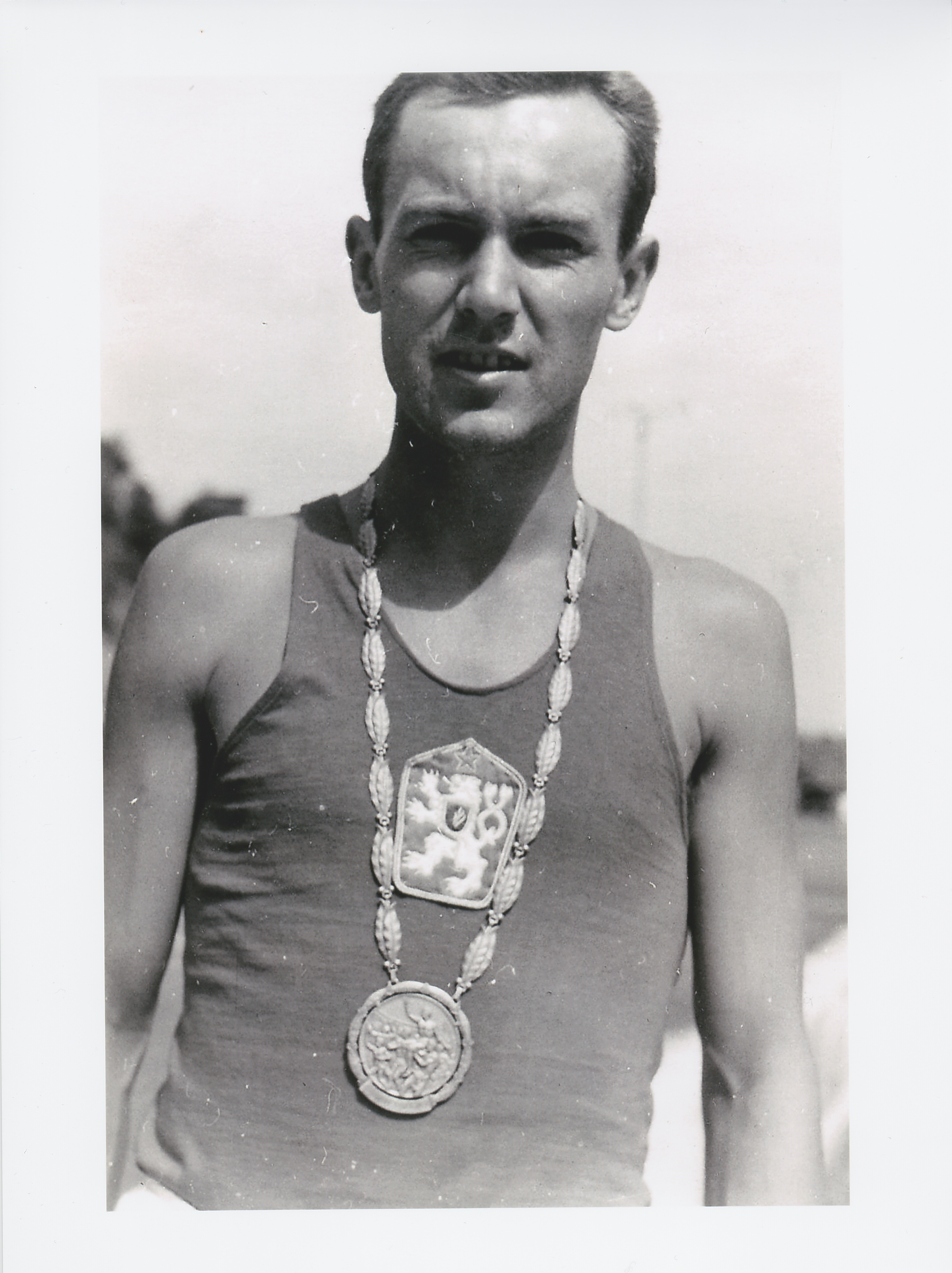
- Koníček in 1960

Personal information
- Born: 18 April 1936 Prague
- Died: August 2026 (aged 90)

Sport
- Sport: Rowing
Medal record
Men's rowing
Representing Czechoslovakia
Olympic Games
Bronze medal – third place	1960 Rome	eight
Bronze medal – third place	1964 Tokyo	eight
European Championships
Bronze medal – third place	1963 Copenhagen	Eight
Silver medal – second place	1959 Mâcon	Eight

Miroslav Koníček (18 April 1936 – August 2026) was a Czech rower who competed for Czechoslovakia in the 1960 and 1964 Summer Olympics.

== Biography ==
Miroslav Koníček was born in Prague on 18 April 1936.

In 1960 he was the coxswain of the Czechoslovak boat which won the bronze medal in the men's eight. He was also the coxswain of the Czechoslovak boat which was eliminated in the semi-finals of the coxed four competition.

Four years later he won his second bronze medal as coxswain of Czechoslovak boat in the men's eight event.

Koníček died in August 2026, at the age of 90.
