= Dario Giani =

Italian rower

Personal information
- Nationality: Italian
- Born: 8 May 1938 (age 86); Talla, Arezzo, Italy

Sport
- Sport: Rowing

Dario Giani (born 8 May 1938) is an Italian rower. He competed in the men's eight event at the 1964 Summer Olympics.
