= Segundo Mora =

Cuban rower

Personal information
- Full name: Segundo Mora Alonso
- Nationality: Cuban
- Born: 8 May 1937 (age 87)

Sport
- Sport: Rowing

Segundo Mora (born 8 May 1937) is a Cuban rower. He competed in the men's eight event at the 1964 Summer Olympics.
