= Max Wieczorek =

Canadian rower (1939–2023)

Personal information
- Full name: Max Wolfgang Wieczorek
- Nationality: Canadian
- Born: 28 April 1939
- Died: 26 June 2023 (aged 84)

Sport
- Sport: Rowing

Max Wolfgang Wieczorek (28 April 1939 – 26 June 2023) was a Canadian rower. He competed in the men's eight event at the 1964 Summer Olympics.

Wieczorek died on 26 June 2023, at the age of 84.
