= Kim Heon-jong =

South Korean rower

Personal information
- Nationality: South Korean
- Born: 25 February 1942 (age 83)

Sport
- Sport: Rowing

Kim Heon-jong (born 25 February 1942) is a South Korean rower. He competed in the men's eight event at the 1964 Summer Olympics.
