= Gilberto Campbell =

Cuban rower

Personal information
- Nationality: Cuban
- Born: 7 April 1940
- Died: 31 March 2016 (aged 75)

Sport
- Sport: Rowing

Gilberto Campbell (7 April 1940 – 31 March 2016) was a Cuban rower. He competed in two events at the 1964 Summer Olympics.
