= Ryuzo Kikuchi =

Japanese rower (born 1942)

Personal information
- Nationality: Japanese
- Born: 21 April 1942 (age 83)

Sport
- Sport: Rowing

Ryuzo Kikuchi (菊地 隆一, Kikuchi Ryūzo, born 21 April 1942) is a Japanese rower. He competed in the men's eight event at the 1964 Summer Olympics.
