= Ahmed Ibrahim (rower) =

Egyptian rower

Personal information
- Nationality: Egyptian
- Born: 8 December 1938 (age 86)

Sport
- Sport: Rowing

Ahmed Ibrahim (born 8 December 1938) is an Egyptian rower. He competed in the men's eight event at the 1964 Summer Olympics.
