= Francesco Glorioso =

Italian rower (1942–2022)

Personal information
- Nationality: Italian
- Born: 29 June 1942; Palermo, Italy
- Died: 13 April 2022 (aged 79); Cefalù, Italy

Sport
- Sport: Rowing

Francesco Glorioso (29 June 1942 – 13 April 2022) was an Italian rower. He competed in the men's eight event at the 1964 Summer Olympics.
