= Leovigildo Millan =

Cuban rower

Personal information
- Nationality: Cuban
- Born: 20 August 1943 (age 81)

Sport
- Sport: Rowing

Leovigildo Millan (born 20 August 1943) is a Cuban rower. He competed in two events at the 1964 Summer Olympics.
