= John Larsen (rower) =

Canadian rower

Personal information
- Nationality: Canadian
- Born: 23 September 1943 (age 81)

Sport
- Sport: Rowing

John Larsen (born 23 September 1943) is a Canadian rower. He competed in the men's eight event at the 1964 Summer Olympics.
