= Thomas Gray (rower) =

Canadian rower

Personal information
- Nationality: Canadian
- Born: January 24, 1936 (age 89)

Sport
- Sport: Rowing

Thomas Gray (born January 24, 1936) is a Canadian rower. He competed in the men's eight event at the 1964 Summer Olympics.
