= Lex Clark =

New Zealand rower (1943–2025)

Personal information
- Born: Alexander Grant Clark; 20 February 1943 Oamaru, New Zealand
- Died: 2 January 2025 (aged 81) Dunedin, New Zealand
- Height: 1.91 m (6 ft 3 in)
- Weight: 85 kg (187 lb)

Sport
- Country: New Zealand
- Sport: Rowing
- Club: Oamaru Rowing Club; North End Rowing Club

Alexander Grant Clark (20 February 1943 – 2 January 2025) was a New Zealand rower who represented his country in the men's eight at the 1964 Olympic Games.

== Biography ==
Clark was born in Oamaru on 20 February 1943, the son of Edith Margaret Grant Clark (née Cameron) and David Alexander Clark.

Clark represented New Zealand in the men's eight at the 1964 Summer Olympics, finishing in 11th place, and is listed as New Zealand Olympian athlete number 167 by the New Zealand Olympic Committee.

A national representative between 1964 and 1966, Clark was a member of the Oamaru Rowing Club, and the North End Rowing Club in Dunedin. He rowed in Auckland during the 1966 season, and was a member of the New Zealand team for the 1966 World Rowing Championships in Yugoslavia. Following his competitive rowing career, he became involved in rowing as an official, earning his starter's licence in the 1970s. He was a starter at Lake Ruataniwha from that venue's inaugural regatta in 1985, and in 2020 he was awarded life membership of South Island Rowing.

Clark died in Dunedin on 2 January 2025, at the age of 81.
