= Cheon Seong-tae =

South Korean rower

Personal information
- Nationality: South Korean
- Born: 20 May 1943 (age 81)

Sport
- Sport: Rowing

Cheon Seong-tae (born 20 May 1943) is a South Korean rower.

He competed in the men's eight event at the 1964 Summer Olympics.
