= Sereno Brunello =

Italian rower (born 1938)

Personal information
- Born: 23 June 1938 (age 88) Sabaudia, Italy
- Height: 183 cm (6 ft 0 in)
- Weight: 81 kg (179 lb)

Sport
- Sport: Rowing
Medal record
Men's rowing
Representing Italy
European Rowing Championships
| Gold medal – first place | 1961 Prague | Eight |

Sereno Brunello (born 23 June 1938) is an Italian rower. He competed at the 1964 Summer Olympics in Tokyo with the men's eight where they came sixth.
