= Graeme McCall =

Australian rower (1937–2016)

Personal information
- Full name: Graeme Allister McCall
- Nationality: Australian
- Born: 30 December 1937
- Died: 3 May 2016 (aged 78)

Sport
- Sport: Rowing
- Club: Mercantile Rowing Club

Achievements and titles
- Olympic finals: Men's eight Tokyo 1964 B final
- National finals: King's Cup 1959–62,64.
Medal record
Men's rowing
Representing Australia
British Empire and Commonwealth Games
| Gold medal – first place | 1962 Perth | Men's Eights |

Graeme McCall (30 December 1937 – 3 May 2016) was an Australian representative rower. He was a three-time national champion, a 1962 Commonwealth Games gold medallist and competed in the men's eight event at the 1964 Summer Olympics.

== Club and state rowing ==
McCall was educated at Scotch College, Melbourne where he took up rowing. He rowed in that school's 1st VIII in his senior year of 1955. His senior rowing was with the Mercantile Rowing Club in Melbourne where he was highly regarded for his 1962 Commonwealth Games result as being one of the furst Mercantile members to win a gold in international competition.

McCall was selected in Victorian state representative men's senior eights contesting the King's Cup at the Interstate Regatta within the Australian Rowing Championships on four consecutive occasions from 1959 to 1962 and then again in 1964. Three of those crews won the King's Cup, with McCall rowing in either the four or six seat.

== International representative rowing ==
The entire 1962 Victorian champion King's Cup crew including McCall was selected as the Australian eight to contest the 1962 Commonwealth Games. McCall was in the six seat of that boat when they rowed to a gold medal victory at those games in Perth. That same crew was encouraged to represent Australia at the inaugural FISA World Championships, the 1962 World Championships in Lucerne. They financed their trip themselves, made it through to the final and finished in overall fifth place.

For the 1964 Tokyo Olympics the winning Victorian King's Cup eight was again selected in toto. They took a new Sargent & Burton eight with them to the Olympics but quickly saw that its design and technology was way behind the European built Donoratico and Stampfli shells being used by the other nations. They discarded the S&B boat and raced in a George Towns eight which had been shipped with haste. This shell had its own problems and they finished last in their heat and third in their repêchage. With nothing to lose, they borrowed a Donoratico eight from the American squad for the B final and with McCall on the six seat they raced to second place in that petite-final and a face-saving overall eighth place in the Olympic regatta.

The 1964 Olympics would be McCall's last racing at the competitive level. He coached an Australian eight in a Trans-Tasman series against NZ in 1967 and much later (from 1989 to 1991) he served on the Rowing Victoria Board as their state delegate to Rowing Australia.
