= Ji Deok-han =

South Korean rower

Personal information
- Nationality: South Korean
- Born: 15 July 1940 (age 84)

Sport
- Sport: Rowing

Ji Deok-han (born 15 July 1940) is a South Korean rower. He competed in the men's eight event at the 1964 Summer Olympics.
