= Orlando Savarin =

Italian rower

Personal information
- Nationality: Italian
- Born: 6 September 1938; Šmarje, Slovenia
- Died: 2 January 2024 (aged 85)

Sport
- Sport: Rowing

Orlando Savarin (6 September 1938 – 2 January 2024) was an Italian rower. He competed in the men's eight event at the 1964 Summer Olympics.
