= Kim Gyu-san =

South Korean rower

Personal information
- Nationality: South Korean
- Born: 1 September 1941 (age 83)

Sport
- Sport: Rowing

Kim Gyu-san (born 1 September 1941) is a South Korean rower. He competed in the men's eight event at the 1964 Summer Olympics.
