= Robert Lachal =

Australian rower

Personal information
- Nationality: Australian
- Born: 11 January 1943 (age 83)
- Education: Riverview

Sport
- Sport: Rowing
- Club: Mercantile Rowing Club

Achievements and titles
- Olympic finals: Men's 8+ Tokyo 1964 B Final
- National finals: King's Cup 1964,67.

Robert Lachal (born 11 January 1943) is an Australian former representative rower. He was a national champion in 1964 and that year competed in the men's eight event at the 1964 Summer Olympics.

== Club and state rowing ==
Lachal was educated at Saint Ignatius' College, Riverview where he took up rowing. He rowed in that school's 1st VIII in his senior year of 1960. His family had relocated to Melbourne during his final year as did Robert post-school. His senior rowing was with the Mercantile Rowing Club in Melbourne.

Lachal was selected in the Victorian state representative men's senior eight which contested and won the King's Cup at the Interstate Regatta within the Australian Rowing Championships in 1964. He made another King's Cup appearance for Victoria in 1967.

== International representative rowing ==
For the 1964 Tokyo Olympics the winning Victorian King's Cup eight was selected in toto. They took a new Sargent & Burton eight with them to the Olympics but quickly saw that its design and technology was way behind the European built Donoratico and Stampfli shells used by the other nations. They discarded the S&B boat and raced in a George Towns eight which had been shipped with haste. This shell had its own problems and they finished last in their heat and 3rd in their repechage. With nothing to lose, they borrowed a Donoratico eight from the American squad for the B final and with Lachal in the three seat they raced to 2nd place in that petite-final and an face-saving overall eighth place in the Olympic regatta.

In 1966 Lachal made the trip to the 2nd ever World Rowing Championships as a reserve for the men's eight. He did not race. In 1967 he was selected with Kim Luff to race a coxless pair at the Trans-Tasman match race series against New Zealand. They won all their races by convincing margins.

== Adventurer ==
During and immediately after rowing competitively Lachal took up other opportunities which came his way. In 1965 he spent six months working at the Australian Antarctic Mawson Station. In 1969 he took up a role in Papua New Guinea as a Patrol Officer, responsible for law and order, health and local government needs of the villagers in his area. He continued to work in Rabaul once independence was granted in PNG. In 1986 he was appointed Station Leader on Macquarie Island for a year.
