= Osvaldo Díaz (rower) =

Cuban rower (born 1943)

Personal information
- Nationality: Cuban
- Born: 28 March 1943 (age 82)

Sport
- Sport: Rowing

Osvaldo Díaz (born 28 March 1943) is a Cuban rower. He competed in two events at the 1964 Summer Olympics.
