= Yoo Hyeok-geun =

South Korean rower

Personal information
- Nationality: South Korean
- Born: 10 May 1944 (age 80)

Sport
- Sport: Rowing

Yoo Hyeok-geun (born 10 May 1944) is a South Korean rower. He competed in the men's eight event at the 1964 Summer Olympics.
