= Hajime Ishikawa =

Japanese rower (born 1941)

Personal information
- Nationality: Japanese
- Born: 20 February 1941 (age 84)

Sport
- Sport: Rowing

Hajime Ishikawa (石川 元, Ishikawa Hajime, born 20 February 1941) is a Japanese rower. He competed in the men's eight event at the 1964 Summer Olympics.
