= Yoshihiro Onishi =

Japanese rower (1941–2003)

Personal information
- Nationality: Japanese
- Born: 21 June 1941
- Died: 17 March 2003 (aged 61)

Sport
- Sport: Rowing

Yoshihiro Onishi (大西 恵弘, Ōnishi Yoshihiro, 21 June 1941 – 17 March 2003) was a Japanese rower. He competed in the men's eight event at the 1964 Summer Olympics.
