= Martin Tomanovits =

Australian rower

Personal information
- Nationality: Australian
- Born: 15 October 1940
- Died: 18 April 2008 (aged 67)

Sport
- Sport: Rowing
- Club: Mercantile Rowing Club

Achievements and titles
- Olympic finals: B Final Tokyo 1964
- National finals: King's Cup 1960 - 1967
Medal record
Men's rowing
Representing Australia
Commonwealth Games
Gold medal – first place	1962 Perth	M8+

Martin Tomanovits (15 October 1940 – 18 April 2008) was a Hungarian born, Australian rower. He was a five-time national champion, represented at two World Rowing Championships and at the 1962 Commonwealth Games and the 1964 Tokyo Olympics in the men's eight.

== Early life ==
Tomanovits was born in 1940 in Hungary, where he was introduced to rowing. He left for Australia in 1956 after the Soviet invasion.

== Club and state rowing ==
His senior rowing was from the Mercantile Rowing Club in Melbourne.

He was seated in all eight Victorian men's eights which contested the King's Cup at the Interstate Regatta within the Australian Rowing Championships between 1960 and 1967. Those Victorian eights won the King's Cup in 1961, 1962, 1963, 1964 and 1966.

== International representative rowing ==
The entire winning Victorian King's Cup crew of 1962 was selected as the Australian eight to contest the 1962 Commonwealth Games. Tomanovits was in the seven seat of that eight when they rowed to a gold medal victory at those games in Perth. That same crew was encouraged to represent Australia at the inaugural FISA World Championships, the 1962 World Championships in Lucerne. They financed their trip themselves, made it through to the final and finished in overall fifth place.

For the 1964 Tokyo Olympics the winning Victorian King's Cup eight was again selected in toto. They took a new Sargent & Burton eight with them to the Olympics but quickly saw that its design and technology was way behind the European built Donoratico and Stampfli shells being used by the other nations. With Marty Tomanovits in the seven seat they raced in a borrowed Donoratico eight for the B final and rowed to an overall eighth place in the Olympic regatta.

The same selection criteria were used for the 2nd World Rowing Championships - those held at Bled in 1966. The Victorian King's Cup crew of 1966 were selected as the Australian eight and they rowed to a tenth placing in Bled with Tomanovits again seated at seven.

== Coaching and administration ==
Post competitive rowing Tomanovits was a coach at Xavier College (Melbourne) and of a number of national championships crews. He coached a Mercantile pair to the national title in 1966, a lightweight eight to a title win in 1975 and a lightweight four to championship victory in 1976. He coached the Victorian state selection lightweight four to Penrith Cup victory in 1976.

He was a club captain and a selector at Mercantile, a board member of Rowing Victoria from 1987 to 1991 and a state and national regatta umpire.
