= Richard Bordewick =

Canadian rower

Personal information
- Nationality: Canadian
- Born: 18 April 1939
- Died: 15 May 2007 (aged 68)

Sport
- Sport: Rowing

Richard Bordewick (18 April 1939 – 15 May 2007) was a Canadian rower. He competed in the men's eight event at the 1964 Summer Olympics.
