= Alfredo Hernández (rower) =

Cuban rower (born 1941)

Personal information
- Full name: Alfredo Hernández Barrera
- Nationality: Cuban
- Born: 24 December 1941 (age 83)

Sport
- Sport: Rowing

Alfredo Hernández Barrera (Note: In this Spanish name, the first or paternal surname is Hernández and the second or maternal family name is Barrera.) (born 24 December 1941) is a Cuban former rower. He competed in two events at the 1964 Summer Olympics.
