= Marc Lemieux =

Canadian rower

Personal information
- Nationality: Canadian
- Born: June 22, 1939 (age 86)

Sport
- Sport: Rowing

Marc Lemieux (born June 22, 1939) is a Canadian rower. He competed in the men's eight event at the 1964 Summer Olympics.
