= Osamu Mandai =

Japanese rower (born 1942)

Personal information
- Nationality: Japanese
- Born: 6 October 1942 (age 82)

Sport
- Sport: Rowing

Osamu Mandai (万代 治, Mandai Osamu, born 6 October 1942) is a Japanese rower. He competed in the men's eight event at the 1964 Summer Olympics.
