= Ibrahim Metwalli =

Egyptian rower

Personal information
- Nationality: Egyptian
- Born: 20 October 1936 (age 88)

Sport
- Sport: Rowing

Ibrahim Metwalli (born 20 October 1936) is an Egyptian rower. He competed in the men's eight event at the 1964 Summer Olympics.
