= Tsugio Ito =

Japanese rower (born 1942)

Personal information
- Nationality: Japanese
- Born: 28 January 1942 (age 83)

Sport
- Sport: Rowing

Tsugio Ito (伊藤 次男, Itō Tsugio, born 28 January 1942) is a Japanese rower. He competed at the 1964 Summer Olympics, 1968 Summer Olympics and the 1972 Summer Olympics.
