= Jadran Barut =

Slovenian rower (born 1940)

Personal information
- Born: 30 December 1940 (age 85) Izola

Sport
- Sport: Rowing
Medal record
Representing Yugoslavia
European Championships
Bronze medal – third place	1964 Amsterdam	Eight

Jadran Barut (born 30 December 1940 in Izola) is a Slovenian rower who competed for Yugoslavia in the men's eight at the 1964 Summer Olympics.
