= Jiří Lundák =

Czech rower

Personal information
- Born: 31 August 1939 (age 86) Prague

Sport
- Sport: Rowing
Medal record
Men's rowing
Representing Czechoslovakia
Bronze medal – third place	1960 Rome	Eight
Bronze medal – third place	1964 Tokyo	Eight
European Championships
Bronze medal – third place	1963 Copenhagen	Eight

Jiří Lundák (born 31 August 1939 in Prague) is a Czech rower who competed for Czechoslovakia in the 1960 Summer Olympics and in the 1964 Summer Olympics.

In 1960 he was a crew member of the Czechoslovak boat which won the bronze medal in the eights event.

Four years later he won his second bronze medal with the Czechoslovak boat in the eights competition.
