= Shin Hasegawa (rowing) =

Japanese rower (born 1940)

Personal information
- Nationality: Japanese
- Born: 11 February 1940 (age 85)

Sport
- Sport: Rowing

Shin Hasegawa (長谷川 辰, Hasegawa Shin, born 11 February 1940) is a Japanese rower. He competed in the men's eight event at the 1964 Summer Olympics, where Japan placed 10th.
