= Daryl Sturdy =

Canadian rower (born 1940)

Personal information
- Nationality: Canadian
- Born: July 28, 1940 (age 85) Port Alice, British Columbia, Canada

Sport
- Sport: Rowing

Daryl Sturdy (born July 28, 1940) is a Canadian rower. He competed at the 1964 Summer Olympics and the 1968 Summer Olympics.
