= Boris Klavora =

Slovenian rower

Personal information
- Born: 20 May 1941 (age 85) Bled

Sport
- Sport: Rowing
Medal record
Representing Yugoslavia
European Rowing Championships
Bronze medal – third place	1964 Amsterdam	Eight

Boris Klavora (born 20 May 1941 in Bled) is a Slovenian rower who competed for Yugoslavia in the men's eight at the 1964 Summer Olympics.
