= Klaus Aeffke =

German rower (born 1940)

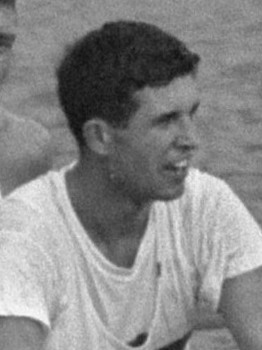

Personal information
- Born: 9 May 1940 (age 86) Neustrelitz, Mecklenburg, Germany
- Height: 1.89 m (6 ft 2 in)
- Weight: 82 kg (181 lb)

Sport
- Sport: Rowing
- Club: Ratzeburger RC
Medal record
Representing Germany
Summer Olympics
| Silver medal – second place | 1964 Tokyo | Eight |
Representing West Germany
World Rowing Championships
| Gold medal – first place | 1962 Lucerne | Eight |
European Rowing Championships
| Gold medal – first place | 1963 Copenhagen | Eight |
| Gold medal – first place | 1964 Amsterdam | Eight |
| Gold medal – first place | 1965 Duisburg | Eight |

Klaus Aeffke (born 9 May 1940) is a retired German rower who was most successful in the eights. In this event he won a silver medal at the 1964 Summer Olympics, a world title in 1962, and three European titles in 1963–1965. Klaus Aeffke passed away on 10 November 2026 in Luebeck Germany.
