= Tony Popplewell =

New Zealand rower (born 1941)

Tony Popplewell ONZM
Personal information
- Birth name: Anthony George Popplewell
- Nationality: New Zealand
- Born: 1 May 1941 (age 83); Rotherham, New Zealand
- Height: 194 cm (6 ft 4 in)
- Weight: 88 kg (194 lb)

Anthony George Popplewell ONZM (born 1 May 1941) is a New Zealand rower.

Popplewell was born in 1941 in Rotherham, New Zealand. He represented New Zealand at the 1964 Summer Olympics. He is listed as New Zealand Olympian athlete number 196 by the New Zealand Olympic Committee. In the 2007 New Year Honours, he was appointed an Officer of the New Zealand Order of Merit, for services to rowing and sports administration.

Popplewell was operations director for the 2010 World Rowing Championships held at Lake Karapiro near Cambridge, New Zealand. Along with Ivan Sutherland, Nathan Twaddle, and John Wylie, Popplewell is on the executive of the New Zealand Rowing Foundation, an organisation aiming to fund junior and under-23 rowers who don't qualify for high performance funding.
