= Jan Mrvík =

Czech rower (1939–2023)

Personal information
- Born: 29 March 1939 Prague, Protectorate of Bohemia and Moravia (now Czech Republic)
- Died: 27 May 2023 (aged 84)

Sport
- Sport: Rowing
Medal record
Men's rowing
Representing Czechoslovakia
Bronze medal – third place	1964 Tokyo	Eight
European Championships
Bronze medal – third place	1963 Copenhagen	Eight

Jan Mrvík (29 March 1939 – 27 May 2023) was a Czech rower who competed for Czechoslovakia in the 1964 Summer Olympics.

== Biography ==
Mrvík was born in Prague on 29 March 1939.

In 1964 he was a crew member of the Czechoslovak boat which won the bronze medal in the eights event.

Mrvík died on 27 May 2023, at the age of 84.
