= Jürgen Schröder (rower) =

German rower

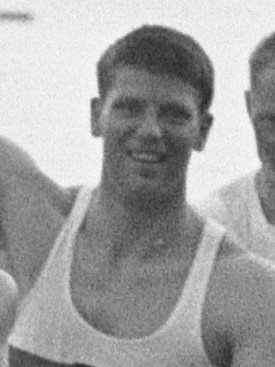
- Jürgen Schroder in 1964

Personal information
- Born: 6 March 1940 (age 86) Grünberg, Germany
- Height: 1.91 m (6 ft 3 in)
- Weight: 94 kg (207 lb)

Sport
- Sport: Rowing
- Club: Ratzeburger RC
Medal record
Men's rowing
Olympic Games
Representing Germany
Silver medal – second place	1964 Tokyo	Eight
European Rowing Championships
Representing West Germany
Gold medal – first place	1964 Amsterdam	Eight
Gold medal – first place	1965 Duisburg	Eight

Jürgen Schröder (born 6 March 1940) is a retired German rower who was most successful in the eights. In this event he won a silver medal at the 1964 Summer Olympics and two European titles in 1964–1965.
