= Peter Delaney (rower) =

New Zealand rower

Personal information
- Nationality: New Zealand
- Born: 9 September 1941 (age 83); Wellington, New Zealand
- Height: 187 cm (6 ft 2 in)
- Weight: 84 kg (185 lb)

Peter Delaney (born 9 September 1941) is a New Zealand rower.

Delaney was born in 1941 in Wellington, New Zealand. He represented New Zealand at the 1964 Summer Olympics. He is listed as New Zealand Olympian athlete number 170 by the New Zealand Olympic Committee.
