= Slobodan Dijaković =

Yugoslav swimmer

Personal information
- Born: 7 July 1947 (age 79) Split, Yugoslavia
- Height: 175 cm (5 ft 9 in)
- Weight: 67 kg (148 lb)

Sport
- Sport: Swimming

Slobodan Dijaković (Слободан Дијаковић, born 7 July 1947) is a Yugoslav former swimmer. He competed in two events at the 1964 Summer Olympics.
