= Raymond Skinner =

New Zealand rower

Personal information
- Birth name: Raymond Leslie Skinner
- Nationality: New Zealand
- Born: 15 October 1940 (age 84); Dunedin, New Zealand
- Height: 187 cm (6 ft 2 in)
- Weight: 85 kg (187 lb)

Raymond Leslie Skinner (born 15 October 1940) is a New Zealand rower.

Skinner was born in 1940 in Dunedin, New Zealand. He represented New Zealand at the 1964 Summer Olympics. He is listed as New Zealand Olympian athlete number 199 by the New Zealand Olympic Committee.
