= Petras Karla =

Lithuanian rower (1937–1969)

Personal information
- Born: 9 April 1937 Didžiasalis, Vilnius, Lithuania
- Died: 14 October 1969 (aged 32) Vilnius, Lithuanian SSR, Soviet Union
- Height: 1.88 m (6 ft 2 in)
- Weight: 86 kg (190 lb)

Sport
- Sport: Rowing
Medal record
Representing the Soviet Union
World Rowing Championships
Silver medal – second place	1962 Lucerne	Eight
European Rowing Championships
Silver medal – second place	1963 Copenhagen	Eight
Silver medal – second place	1964 Amsterdam	Eight

Petras Karla (9 April 1937 – 14 October 1969) was a Lithuanian rower who specialized in the eight event. In this event he won three silver medals at the European and world championships of 1962–1964 and finished fifth at the 1964 Summer Olympics.

In 1962, Karla graduated from the Physics Department of Vilnius University.
