= Thomas Ahrens (rowing) =

German coxswain (born 1948)

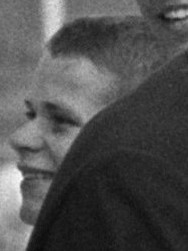

Personal information
- Born: 27 May 1948 (age 78) Mölln, Germany
- Height: 1.63 m (5 ft 4 in)
- Weight: 50 kg (110 lb)

Sport
- Sport: Rowing
- Club: Ratzeburger RC
Medal record
Representing Germany
Summer Olympics
Silver medal – second place	1964 Tokyo	Eight
Representing West Germany
World Rowing Championships
Gold medal – first place	1962 Lucerne	Eight
European Rowing Championships
Gold medal – first place	1963 Copenhagen	Eight
Gold medal – first place	1964 Amsterdam	Eight

Thomas Ahrens (born 27 May 1948) is a retired German coxswain who was most successful in the eights. In this event he won a silver medal at the 1964 Summer Olympics, a world title in 1962, and two European titles in 1963 and 1964.
