= Klaus Bittner =

West German rower

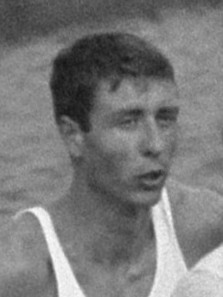

Personal information
- Born: 23 October 1938 (age 87) Görlitz, Germany
- Height: 1.91 m (6 ft 3 in)
- Weight: 85 kg (187 lb)

Sport
- Sport: Rowing
- Club: Ratzeburger RC
Medal record
Summer Olympics
Representing Germany
Gold medal – first place	1960 Rome	Eight
Silver medal – second place	1964 Tokyo	Eight
European Rowing Championships
Representing West Germany
Gold medal – first place	1959 Mâcon	Eight
Gold medal – first place	1961 Prague	Coxless four
Gold medal – first place	1963 Copenhagen	Coxed four
Gold medal – first place	1964 Amsterdam	Eight

Klaus Bittner (born 23 October 1938) is a retired German rower who won two Olympic medals for the United Team of Germany: a gold and a silver in the eights in 1960 and 1964, respectively. He also won four European titles in fours and eights between 1959 and 1964.
