= Július Toček =

Slovak rower

Personal information
- Born: 29 September 1939 Margitfalva, Hungary
- Died: 7 October 2004 (aged 65) Winterthur, Switzerland
- Height: 188 cm (6 ft 2 in)
- Weight: 86 kg (190 lb)

Sport
- Sport: Rowing
Medal record
Men's rowing
Representing Czechoslovakia
Olympic Games
Bronze medal – third place	1964 Tokyo	Eight

Július Toček (29 September 1939 – 7 October 2004) was a Slovak rower who competed for Czechoslovakia in the 1964 Summer Olympics.

He was born in Margecany and died in Winterthur, Switzerland. In 1964 he was a crew member of the Czechoslovak boat which won the bronze medal in the men's eight event.
