= Richard Nový =

Czech rower (born 1937)

Personal information
- Born: 3 April 1937 (age 89) Prague

Sport
- Sport: Rowing
Medal record
Men's rowing
Representing Czechoslovakia
Bronze medal – third place	1964 Tokyo	Eight
European Championships
Bronze medal – third place	1963 Copenhagen	Eight

Richard Nový (born 3 April 1937) is a Czech rower who competed for Czechoslovakia in the 1960 Summer Olympics and in the 1964 Summer Olympics.

He was born in Prague.

In 1960 he was a crew member of the Czechoslovak boat which was eliminated in the semi-finals of the coxed four event.

Four years later he won the bronze medal with the Czechoslovak boat in the eights competition.
