= Zdenko Balaš =

Yugoslavian rower (born 1940)

Personal information
- Born: Зденко Балаш; 9 September 1940 (age 85) Slavonski Brod
- Height: 161 cm (5 ft 3 in)
- Weight: 53 kg (117 lb)

Sport
- Sport: Rowing
Medal record
Men's rowing
Representing Yugoslavia
European Rowing Championships
Bronze medal – third place	1964 Amsterdam	Eight

Zdenko Balaš (Serbian: Зденко Балаш, born 9 September 1940 in Slavonski Brod) is a Croatian coxswain. He competed for Yugoslavia in the 1964 European Rowing Championships in Amsterdam in the eight competition where he won a bronze medal. The same team competed two months later in the men's eight at the 1964 Summer Olympics where they came fourth. The whole team was inducted into the Slovenian Athletes Hall of Fame in 2012.
