= André Fevret =

French rower

Personal information
- Full name: André Alexis Fevret
- Nationality: French
- Born: 24 October 1941; Troyes, Aube, France
- Died: 2 July 2006 (aged 64); Troyes, Aube, France

Sport
- Sport: Rowing

André Alexis Fevret (24 October 1941 – 2 July 2006) was a French rower. He competed in the men's eight event at the 1964 Summer Olympics.
