= David Overton (rowing) =

Canadian rower (born 1943)

Personal information
- Full name: David Roy Overton
- Nationality: Canadian
- Born: August 18, 1943 (age 82)

Sport
- Sport: Rowing

David Overton (born August 18, 1943) is a Canadian rower. He competed in the men's eight event at the 1964 Summer Olympics.
