= Vjekoslav Skalak =

Croatian rower

Personal information
- Born: 21 September 1938 (age 87) Filipovac, Yugoslavia

Sport
- Sport: Rowing
Medal record
Representing Yugoslavia
European Rowing Championships
Bronze medal – third place	1964 Amsterdam	Eight

Vjekoslav Skalak (born 21 September 1938 in Filipovac) is a Croatian rower who competed for Yugoslavia in the men's eight at the 1964 Summer Olympics.
