= Jürgen Plagemann =

West German rower (1936–2026)

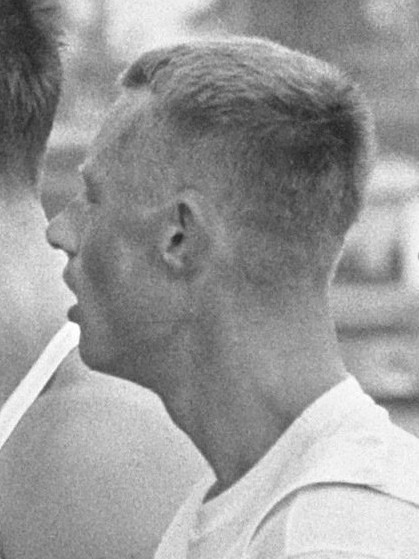
- Plagemann in 1964

Personal information
- Born: 28 December 1936 Lauenburg, Gau Schleswig-Holstein, Germany
- Died: 8 January 2026 (aged 89)
- Height: 1.82 m (6 ft 0 in)
- Weight: 77 kg (170 lb)

Sport
- Sport: Rowing
- Club: Ratzeburger RC
Medal record
Representing Germany
Summer Olympics
Silver medal – second place	1964 Tokyo	Eight
Representing West Germany
World Rowing Championships
Gold medal – first place	1962 Lucerne	Eight
European Rowing Championships
Gold medal – first place	1963 Copenhagen	Eight
Gold medal – first place	1964 Amsterdam	Eight

Jürgen Plagemann (28 December 1936 – 8 January 2026) was a German rower who was most successful in the eights. In this event he won a silver medal at the 1964 Summer Olympics, a world title in 1962, and two European titles in 1963–1964.

Plagemann died on 8 January 2026, at the age of 89.
