= Koichi Miyano =

Japanese rower (born 1942)

Personal information
- Nationality: Japanese
- Born: 18 December 1942 (age 82)

Sport
- Sport: Rowing

Koichi Miyano (宮野 洪一, Miyano Kōichi, born 18 December 1942) is a Japanese rower. He competed in the men's eight event at the 1964 Summer Olympics.
