= Tsuneo Ogasawara =

Japanese rower (born 1942)

Personal information
- Nationality: Japanese
- Born: 30 July 1942 (age 84)

Sport
- Sport: Rowing

Tsuneo Ogasawara (小笠原 恒夫, Ogasawara Tsuneo; born 30 July 1942) is a Japanese rower. He competed in the men's eight event at the 1964 Summer Olympics.
