= Norge Marrero =

Cuban rower

Personal information
- Born: 12 November 1943 (age 81); Havana, Cuba

Sport
- Sport: Rowing

Norge Marrero (born 12 November 1943) is a Cuban rower. He competed at the 1964 Summer Olympics and the 1968 Summer Olympics.
