= Alojz Colja =

Slovenian rower (born 1943)

Personal information
- Born: 21 May 1943 (age 83) Bled

Sport
- Sport: Rowing
Medal record
Representing Yugoslavia
European Rowing Championships
Bronze medal – third place	1964 Amsterdam	Eight

Alojz Colja (born 21 May 1943 in Bled) is a Slovenian rower who competed for Yugoslavia in the men's eight at the 1964 Summer Olympics.
