= Ali Abdel Sami =

Egyptian rower

Personal information
- Nationality: Egyptian
- Born: 6 January 1936 (age 89)

Sport
- Sport: Rowing

Ali Abdel Sami (Arabic: علي عبد السامي, born 6 January 1936) is an Egyptian rower. He competed in the 1964 Summer Olympics.
