= Park Sin-yeong =

South Korean rower

Personal information
- Nationality: South Korean
- Born: 26 July 1942 (age 82)

Sport
- Sport: Rowing

Park Sin-yeong (born 26 July 1942) is a South Korean rower. He competed in the men's eight event at the 1964 Summer Olympics.
