= Bohumil Janoušek =

Czech rower (born 1937)

Personal information
- Born: 7 September 1937 (age 88) Prague

Sport
- Sport: Rowing
Medal record
Men's rowing
Representing Czechoslovakia
Olympic Games
Bronze medal – third place	1960 Rome	Eight
Bronze medal – third place	1964 Tokyo	Eight
European Championships
Silver medal – second place	1959 Mâcon	Eight
Bronze medal – third place	1963 Copenhagen	Eight

Bohumil Janoušek (or Bob Janousek; born 7 September 1937) is a Czech rower who competed for Czechoslovakia in the 1960 Summer Olympics and in the 1964 Summer Olympics, and later moved to Britain as a rowing coach and then a boat-builder.

He was born in Prague. In 1960 he was a crew member of the Czechoslovak boat which won the bronze medal in the eights event. Four years later he won his second bronze medal with the Czechoslovak boat in the eights competition.

In 1969, Janousek, despite then speaking no English, was appointed as British national rowing coach. In the next seven years, he introduced training methods to British rowing that were already widespread elsewhere in Europe and formed the first British national rowing squad. Janousek stepped down as coach after the 1976 Olympic Games, at which Britain gained silver medals in double sculls and in eights, but stayed in Britain to form a boat-building business, Janousek Racing Boats.
