= Toda Rowing Course =

Olympic rowing venue in Tokyo, Japan

Coordinates: 35°48′07″N 139°40′37″E

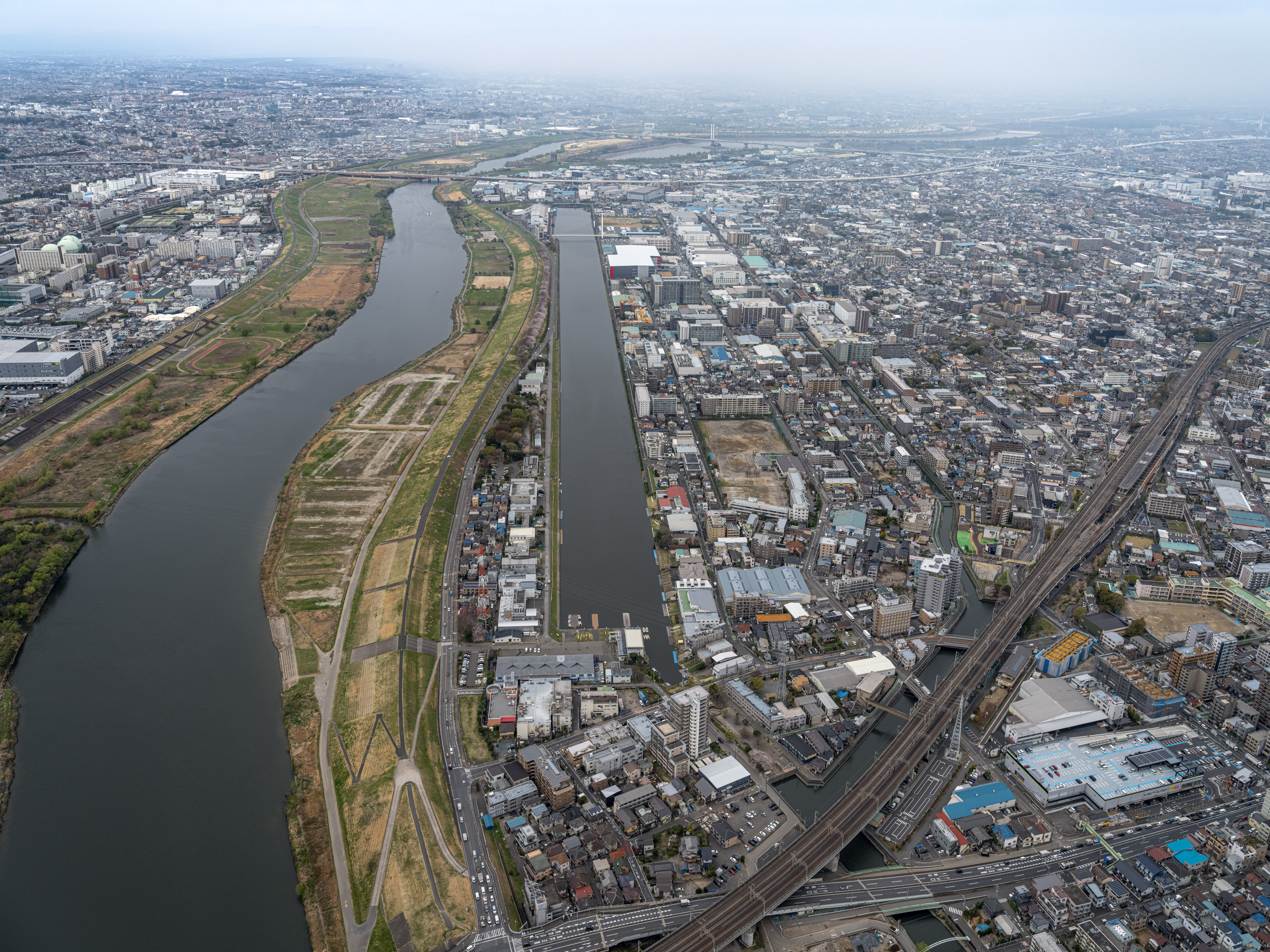
Toda Rowing Course pictured in 2021

The Toda Rowing Course (戸田漕艇場, Toda Sōteijō) is a purpose-built rowing venue that hosted the rowing event at the 1964 Summer Olympics. Originally completed in 1939 for the 1940 Summer Olympics that were cancelled due to World War II. After World War II, the venue was left in disrepair. When Tokyo was awarded the 1964 Summer Olympics in 1958, the venue was expanded and reconstructed.

For the Tokyo 2020 Summer Olympics and Paralympic Games held in July and August 2021 respectively, rowing events were held at the newly constructed Sea Forest Waterway venue.

== Location and Facilities ==
The course is located on an embankment of the Arakawa River in Saitama Prefecture just north of Tokyo. Access for boat crews to the nearby Arakawa River as an alternative training venue is facilitated by a series of broad steps over the river embankments.

While the Toda course is able to accommodate standard Olympic length 2 kilometre rowing races, the starting 500m section of course is closed off on non regatta days for power boat racing.

A number of Tokyo-based universities and corporate teams own and maintain boat houses and training facilities on both the north and south banks of the waterway. The course is the venue for annual races between numerous school and university teams including long established rivalries between Kaisei Academy and Otsuka, University of Tsukuba High School. A large scale regatta known as The Cherry Blossom Regatta is held each spring attracting university and high school teams from across the country.

While both Keio University and Waseda University both maintain large scale boat houses and training facilities at Toda, the main Keio Waseda regatta is traditionally held on the Sumida River over a course length of 3,750 meters going upstream between the Shin-Ohashi Bridge and the Sakurabashi.
