= Kevin Wickham (rower) =

Australian rower (1939–2020)

Personal information
- Full name: Kevin John Wickham
- Nationality: Australian
- Born: 21 July 1939
- Died: 4 July 2020 (aged 80)

Sport
- Sport: Rowing

Kevin John Wickham (21 July 1939 – 4 July 2020) was an Australian representative rowing coxswain. He competed as coxswain in the men's eight event at the 1964 Summer Olympics.

== Rowing career ==
Wickham was raised in Colac, Victoria. His senior club coxing was from the Banks Rowing Club in Melbourne.

He made his first and only state appearance for Victoria in the stern of the senior men's eight which contested and won the King's Cup at the 1964 Australian Interstate Regatta.

In 1962 Wickham coxed a Victorian coxed four which was selected to race for Australia at the inaugural World Rowing Championships in Lucerne. They placed fifth overall.

For the 1964 Tokyo Olympics the winning Victorian King's Cup eight was selected in toto. They took a new Sargent & Burton eight with them to the Olympics but quickly saw that its design and technology was way behind the European built Donoratico and Stampfli shells being used by the other nations. With Wickham in the stern they raced in a borrowed Donoratico eight for the B final and rowed to an overall eighth place in the Olympic regatta.

== Business career ==
Wickham worked in marketing with Qantas and in 1977 started a travel convention consultancy with medical practitioners as his primary clients.

== Sailing ==
In the 1990s Wickham joined the Blairgowrie Yacht Squadron. He served as a committee man and from 2005 to 2007 was the Club Commodore.
