= Ali Abdel Radi =

Egyptian rower

Personal information
- Nationality: Egyptian
- Born: 1 November 1939 (age 85)

Sport
- Sport: Rowing

Ali Abdel Radi (Arabic: علي عبد الراضي, born 1 November 1939) is an Egyptian rower. He competed in the 1964 Summer Olympics.
