= Hans-Jürgen Wallbrecht =

West German rower (1943–1970)

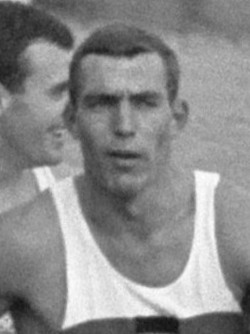

Personal information
- Born: 8 August 1943 Neubrandenburg, Germany
- Died: 7 December 1970 (aged 27)
- Height: 1.87 m (6 ft 2 in)
- Weight: 93 kg (205 lb)

Sport
- Sport: Rowing
- Club: Ratzeburger RC
Medal record
Representing Germany
Summer Olympics
Silver medal – second place	1964 Tokyo	Eight
Representing West Germany
World Rowing Championships
Gold medal – first place	1962 Lucerne	Eight
European Rowing Championships
Gold medal – first place	1963 Copenhagen	Eight
Gold medal – first place	1964 Amsterdam	Eight
Gold medal – first place	1965 Duisburg	Eight

Hans-Jürgen Wallbrecht (8 August 1943 – 7 December 1970) was a German rower who was most successful in the eights. In this event he won a silver medal at the 1964 Summer Olympics, a world title in 1962, and three European titles in 1963–1965.
