= David Ramage =

Australian rower

David Barton Ramage
Personal information
- Nationality: Australian
- Born: 25 June 1939 (age 87)
- Education: Geelong College
- Height: 5 ft 10.5 in (179.1 cm)
- Weight: 181 lb (82 kg)

Sport
- Club: Corio Bay Rowing Club; Banks Rowing Club

Achievements and titles
- Olympic finals: B Final Tokyo 1964; B Final Mexico 1968
- National finals: King's Cup 1963-65, 1969
Medal record
Men's rowing
Representing Australia
Commonwealth Games
Silver medal – second place	1962 Perth	Men's Coxed Four

David Ramage (born 25 June 1939) is an Australian former rower. He was a five time national champion who won a Commonwealth Games silver medal and competed at two Olympic Games. He still won gold medals at World Masters Championships in 2015.

== Club and state rowing ==
Ramage was educated and introduced to rowing at Geelong College. He rowed in that school's first VIIIs in 1956 and 1957 to victory both years at the Victorian schools Head of the River.

His senior club rowing was from the Corio Bay Rowing Club and later the Banks Rowing Club in Melbourne. At Corio Bay he rowed in a club coxed four which was undefeated in thirty-two consecutive starts throughout the racing seasons from 1960 to 1962 including Victorian and New South Wales state championship titles. At the inaugural Australian Rowing Championships of 1962 he stroked that Corio Bay crew to the Australian coxed four championship title.

Ramage was selected in Victorian men's eights which contested the King's Cup at the Interstate Regatta within the Australian Rowing Championships in 1963, 1964, 1965 and 1969. Those Victorian eights won the King's Cup in 1963, 1964 and 1969.

Ramage had been rowing in Victorian and Australian representative eights with Paul Guest from 1963. In 1967 they teamed up as a coxless pair and began rowing from Melbourne's Banks Rowing Club. They would become one of the finest pair oared crews Australia has ever produced. In both years of 1967 and 1968 they won the Victorian state and the New South Wales state titles. In 1968 they won the Australian national title.

== International representative rowing ==
The Australian champion Corio Bay crew of 1962 was selected as the Australian coxed four to contest the 1962 Commonwealth Games. Ramage stroked that crew to a silver medal win at the Commonwealth Games in Perth. They were selected to contest the 1962 World Rowing Championships in Lucerne but were unable to travel.

For the 1964 Tokyo Olympics that year's winning Victorian King's Cup eight was selected in toto. The Australian squad took a new Sargent & Burton eight with them to the Olympics but quickly saw that its design and technology were way behind the European built Donoratico and Stampfli shells used by the other nations. They raced in a borrowed Donoratico eight for the B final and finished in overall eighth place in the Olympic regatta with Ramage in the four seat.

The same selection criteria were used for the 2nd World Rowing Championships - those held at Bled in 1966. The Victorian King's Cup crew of 1966 were selected as the Australian eight and with Ramage at bow they rowed to a tenth placing in Bled.

As the national coxless pair champions of 1968 Ramage and Guest were selected as Australia's pair entrants for the 1968 Mexico Olympics. In the course of the semi-final, when leading the field a short distance from the finish, Ramage suffered acute oxygen loss from the high-altitude venue and, they were overrun on the line. The missed out on the final and ultimately won their B final in a time 6 seconds faster than the gold medal-winning East Germans.

== Coaching and Masters rowing ==
Ramage coached Geelong College schoolboy crews from 1973 to 1978 and later from 1989 to 1991. He took them to victories in the Victorian schools Head of the River in 1976 and 1990 and to an Australian Championships schoolboy title and Interstate Regatta youth eight win (as the state selected Victorian crew) in 1975.

From 2009 to 2015 Ramage rowed competitively at Masters Regattas in crews with Paul Guest. At the 2015 World Rowing Masters Regatta, they won four gold medals.
