= Jože Berc =

Yugoslavian rower (born 1944)

Personal information
- Born: 5 December 1944 (age 81) Bled, Slovenia

Sport
- Sport: Rowing
Medal record
Representing Yugoslavia
European Rowing Championships
Bronze medal – third place	1964 Amsterdam	Eight

Jože Berc (born 5 December 1944 in Bled) is a Slovenian rower who competed for Yugoslavia in the men's eight at the 1964 Summer Olympics.
