= Luděk Pojezný =

Czech rower (born 1937)

Personal information
- Born: 7 March 1937 (age 89) Prague

Sport
- Sport: Rowing
Medal record
Men's rowing
Representing Czechoslovakia
Olympic Games
Bronze medal – third place	1960 Rome	Eight
Bronze medal – third place	1964 Tokyo	Eight
European Championships
Bronze medal – third place	1963 Copenhagen	Eight
Silver medal – second place	1959 Mâcon	Eight

Luděk Pojezný (born 7 March 1937) is a Czech rower who competed for Czechoslovakia in the 1960 Summer Olympics and in the 1964 Summer Olympics.

He was born in Prague.

In 1960 he was a crew member of the Czechoslovak boat which won the bronze medal in the eights event.

Four years later he won his second bronze medal with the Czechoslovak boat in the eights competition.
