= Pavao Martić =

Croatian rower (born 1940)

Personal information
- Born: 23 November 1940 (age 85) Split-Dalmatia County
- Height: 186 cm (6 ft 1 in)
- Weight: 82 kg (181 lb)

Sport
- Sport: Rowing
- Club: Croatian rowing club Mornar
Medal record
Men's rowing
Representing Yugoslavia
European Rowing Championships
Bronze medal – third place	1964 Amsterdam	Eight

Pavao Martić (born 9 September 1940 in Split-Dalmatia County) is a Croatian rower. He rowed for the Croatian rowing club Mornar. He competed for Yugoslavia in the 1964 European Rowing Championships in Amsterdam in the eight competition where he won a bronze medal. The same team competed two months later in the men's eight at the 1964 Summer Olympics where they came fourth. The whole team was inducted into the Slovenian Athletes Hall of Fame in 2012.
