= Klaus Behrens =

West German Olympic rower (1941–2022)

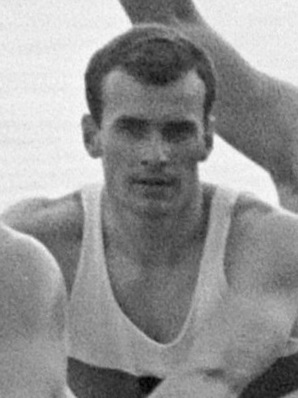
- Behrens in 1964

Personal information
- Born: 3 August 1941 Ratzeburg, Schleswig-Holstein, Prussia, Germany
- Died: 19 September 2022 (aged 81) Frankfurt am Main, Hesse, Germany
- Height: 1.91 m (6 ft 3 in)
- Weight: 88 kg (194 lb)

Sport
- Sport: Rowing
- Club: Ratzeburger RC
Medal record
Representing Germany
Summer Olympics
Silver medal – second place	1964 Tokyo	Eight
Representing West Germany
World Rowing Championships
Gold medal – first place	1962 Lucerne	Eight
European Rowing Championships
Gold medal – first place	1963 Copenhagen	Eight
Gold medal – first place	1964 Amsterdam	Eight
Gold medal – first place	1965 Duisburg	Eight

Klaus Behrens (3 August 1941 – 19 September 2022) was a German rower who was most successful in the eights. In this event he won a silver medal at the 1964 Summer Olympics, a world title in 1962, and three European titles in 1963–1965.
