= Thomas Amlong =

American rower (1935–2009)

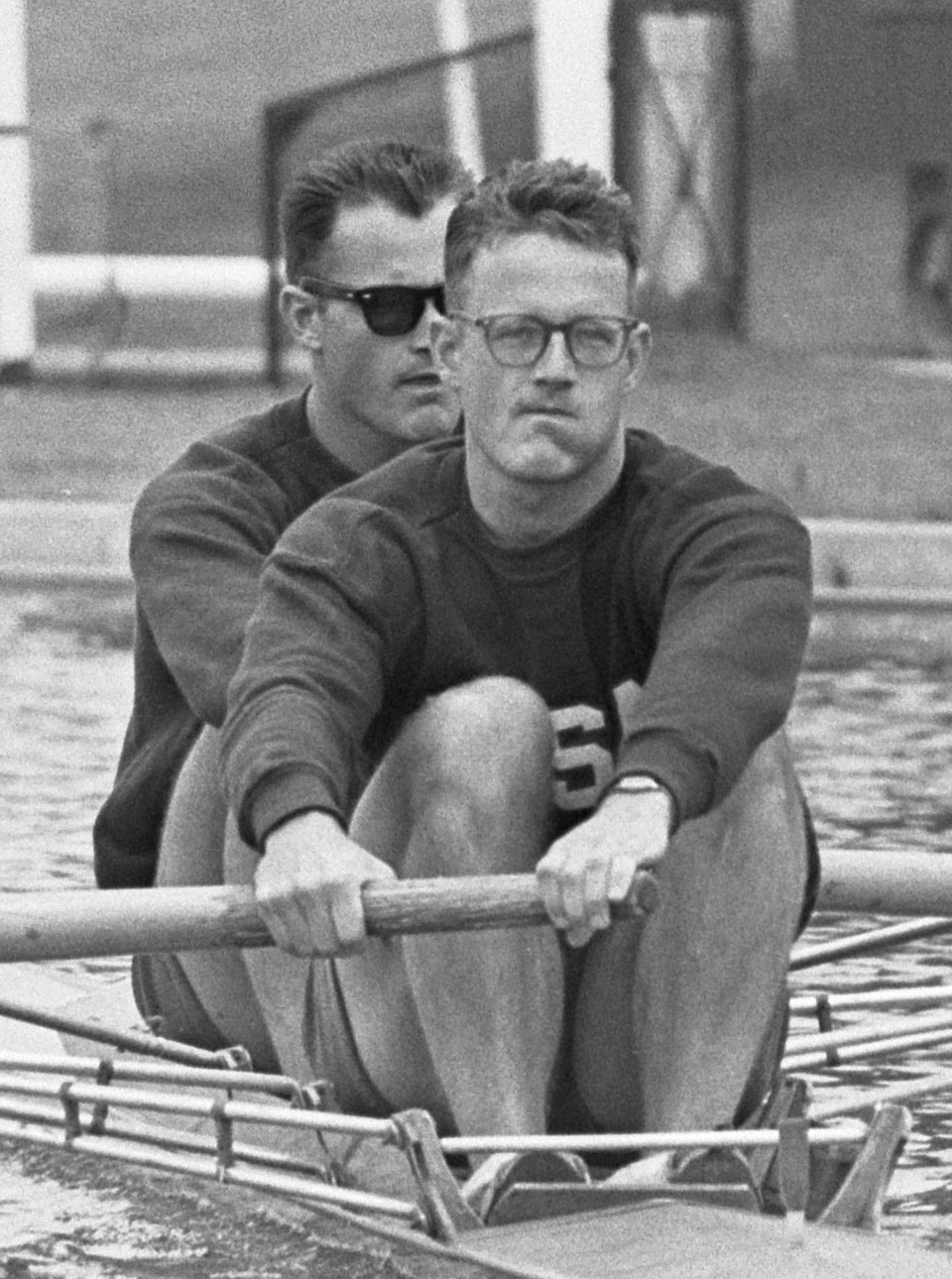
- Amlong brothers at the 1964 European Championships. Tom is in front.

Personal information
- Born: June 15, 1935 Fort Knox, Kentucky, U.S.
- Died: January 26, 2009 (aged 73) New Haven, Connecticut, U.S.
- Height: 186 cm (6 ft 1 in)
- Weight: 91 kg (201 lb)

Sport
- Sport: Rowing
- Club: Vesper Boat Club
Medal record
Representing the United States
Olympic Games
Gold medal – first place	1964 Tokyo	Eight

Thomas Kennedy "Tom" Amlong (June 15, 1935 – January 26, 2009) was an American competition rower who often teamed with his brother Joe. In 1964 they won the national title in coxless pairs and an Olympic gold medal in the eights.

Amlong was the third son of Colonel Ransom George Amlong and Marguerite Kennedy. He was born at Fort Knox, Kentucky, where his father was stationed at the time. In 1946 the family moved to Huntley Meadows Park in Fairfax County, Virginia, and lived there until 1950, when Amlong Sr. was transferred to Liège, Belgium. There Tom and Joe were introduced to rowing in 1951. Later in 1951 they moved to Germany and competed there in coxless pairs in 1952. The brothers became quickly known for their power, rude characters and lack of communication skills. In 1953 Amlong Sr. retired, and the family returned to Huntley. After the death of Marguerite in 1972, Ransom George and Tom moved to Louisiana.

In August 1954 Tom and Joe enlisted to the 82nd Airborne Division. Next year they successfully applied to an Army sports program, and were transferred to Washington, to prepare for the 1956 Olympics at the Potomac River. They were defeated at the 1956 Olympic Trials, and soon after that Tom enrolled to University of Maryland, a year later transferring to University of Virginia. In 1961 the brothers joined the Vesper Boat Club in Philadelphia.

Following his father Amlong had a 20-year-long career in the U.S. Army and was deployed in Vietnam. He retired as captain, and later had cancer, presumably caused by exposure to Agent Orange in Vietnam. In his late life Amlong lived in Old Lyme, Connecticut. He was a lifetime member of the National Rowing Association and Vesper Rowing Club. He died aged 73. he also had a sister Mary Diane Amlong.

== Cited sources ==
- William A Stowe (2005). All Together. iUniverse. ISBN 978-0-595-34388-1.
