= Lee Sang-u =

South Korean rower (born 1943)

Personal information
- Nationality: South Korean
- Born: 1 April 1943 (age 81)

Sport
- Sport: Rowing

Lee Sang-u (Korean: 이상우; born 1 April 1943) is a South Korean rower. He competed in the men's eight event at the 1964 Summer Olympics.
