= Joseph Amlong =

American rower (1936–2019)

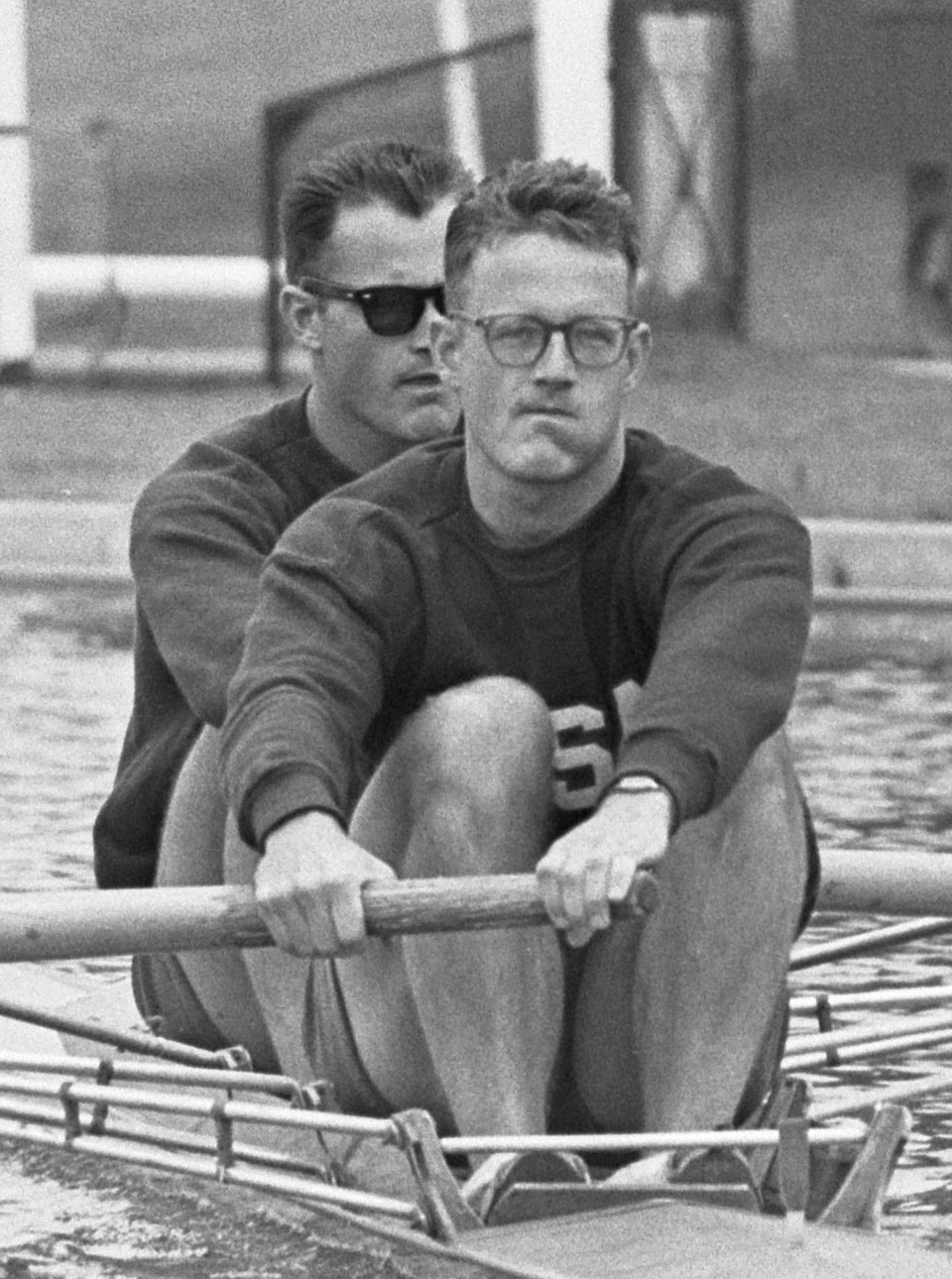
- Amlong brothers at the 1964 European Championships. Joe is left.

Personal information
- Full name: Joseph Brian Amlong
- Born: December 17, 1936 Haines, Alaska, U.S.
- Died: July 1, 2019 (aged 82) Vero Beach, Florida

Sport
- Sport: Rowing
- Club: Vesper Boat Club
Medal record
Representing the United States
Olympic Games
Gold medal – first place	1964 Tokyo	Eight
European Rowing Championships
Bronze medal – third place	1965 Duisburg	Eight

Joseph Brian "Joe" Amlong (December 17, 1936 – July 1, 2019) was an American competition rower who often teamed with his brother Tom. In 1964 they won the national title in coxless pairs and an Olympic gold medal in the eights. Next year Joe won a bronze medal in the eights at the European championships.

Amlong was born at a military base in Haines, Alaska, to Colonel Ransom George Amlong and Marguerite Kennedy. He had a sister Mary Diane and four brothers: John Michael, Ransom Jerome, Thomas Kennedy and William. In 1946 the family moved to Huntley Meadows Park in Fairfax County, Virginia, and lived there until 1950, when Colonel Amlong was transferred to Belgium. In 1953 Amlong Sr. retired, and the family returned to Huntley.

Amlong took up rowing in Liège, Belgium, in 1951, together with Tom. Later in 1951 they moved to Germany and competed there in coxless pairs in 1952. The brothers became quickly known for their power, rude characters and lack of communication skills. In August 1954 they enlisted to the 82nd Airborne Division. Next year they successfully applied to an Army sports program, and were transferred to Washington, to prepare for the 1956 Olympics at the Potomac River. They were defeated at the 1956 Olympic Trials, and the same year Joe enrolled to the United States Military Academy, graduating in 1961. Later in 1961 Joe and Tom joined the Vesper Boat Club in Philadelphia.

As most of his brothers, Amlong followed his father and had a long military career, retiring as a U.S. Air Force captain after 20 years of service. This career was hampered by rowing, and he did not advance in ranks after the 1964 Games, same as his brother Tom. On August 12, 1963 Joseph married Gail Moon and had three daughters with her. They lived in a remote place at Grand Cole, Montana, and then moved to Vero Beach, Florida.

== Cited sources ==
- William A Stowe (2005). All Together. iUniverse. ISBN 978-0-595-34388-1.
