= Marko Mandič (rower) =

Croatian rower

Marko Mandić
Personal information
- Born: Маrко Маndić; 20 July 1939 Goriš, Croatia
- Died: 29 June 1991 (aged 51) Bled, Slovenia
- Height: 186 cm (6 ft 1 in)
- Weight: 85 kg (187 lb)

Sport
- Sport: Rowing
Medal record
Men's rowing
Representing Yugoslavia
European Rowing Championships
Bronze medal – third place	1964 Amsterdam	Eight

Marko Mandić (Croatian: Марко Мандић, 20 July 1939 – 29 June 1991) was a Croatian rower.

Mandić was born in Goriš in 1939. He competed for Yugoslavia in the 1964 European Rowing Championships in Amsterdam in the eight competition where he won a bronze medal. The same team competed two months later in the men's eight at the 1964 Summer Olympics where they came fourth. Mandić competed in the coxless four at the 1972 Summer Olympics where they were eliminated in the repêchage. He died in 1991 in Bled.

The whole 1964 Olympic team was inducted into the Slovenian Athletes Hall of Fame in 2012.
