= Lucijan Kleva =

Slovenian rower

Personal information
- Born: 15 February 1942
- Died: 26 January 2009 (aged 66)

Sport
- Sport: Rowing
Medal record
Representing Yugoslavia
European Rowing Championships
Bronze medal – third place	1964 Amsterdam	Eight

Lucijan Kleva (15 February 1942 – 26 January 2009) was a Slovenian rower who competed for Yugoslavia in the men's eight at the 1964 Summer Olympics.
