= Tsuneo Hasegawa =

Japanese mountaineer

Tsuneo Hasegawa (長谷川 恒男, Hasegawa Tsuneo; December 8, 1947 – c. October 10, 1991) was a Japanese alpinist.

== Career ==
His achievements include the winter solo ascent of the "Great North Faces of the Alps" or "North Face Trilogy" (Matterhorn in 1977, second winter solo ascent ever; Eiger in 1978, first winter solo ascent ever; Grandes Jorasses in 1979, also first winter solo ascent ever) and the world's first winter solo ascent of the South Face of Aconcagua in 1981.

== Death ==
He died in 1991 in an avalanche while ascending the Ultar II South east face.

== Notable achievements ==
- 1977 World second winter solo ascent to Matterhorn North Face.
- 1978 World first winter solo ascent to Eiger North Face.
- 1979 Winter solo ascent to Grandes Jorasses North Face.
- 1980 Winter solo ascent to Aconcagua North Face Normal Route.
- 1981 World first winter solo ascent to Aconcagua South face France Route.

== Legacy ==
Tsuneo Hasegawa and his climbing partner were buried according to Shia Imami Ismaili tradition in the Ultar Meadows of Hunza Valley. A year after his death, Masami Hasegawa, the wife of late Tsuneo Hasegawa, established Hasegawa Memorial Public School in Karimabad, Hunza. It is now one of the largest public schools in Hunza offering education from montessori to college level.

Every year in October, selected students and teachers of Hasegawa Memorial Public School & College embark on a hike to the tomb of Hasegawa to pay tribute to the late climbers.

His solo ascents of the Eiger and Matterhorn north faces are described in the manga The Summit of the Gods by Jiro Taniguchi.

== Bibliography ==
- "北壁に舞う：生きぬくことが冒険だ"(1979) Shueisha Publishing(集英社) ISBN 4-08-749015-7
- "岩壁よおはよう"(1981) Chuo Koron Publishing (中央公論社) ISBN 4-12-201139-6
- "北壁からのメッセージ"(1984) Minshusha Publishing(民衆社) ISBN 4-12-203192-3
- "我が青春の挑戦"(1984) Seikyo Shimbun Publishing(聖教新聞社) co-authored with Ken'ichi Horie
- "山に向かいて"(1987) Benesse Corporation Publishing (ベネッセコーポレーション福武書店) ISBN 4-8288-3184-3
- "生きぬくことは冒険だよ"(1992) Shueisha Publishing(集英社) ISBN 4-08-748759-8 edited by Masami Hasegawa and Toyoji Oda
