= Hugh Foley =

American rower (1944–2016)

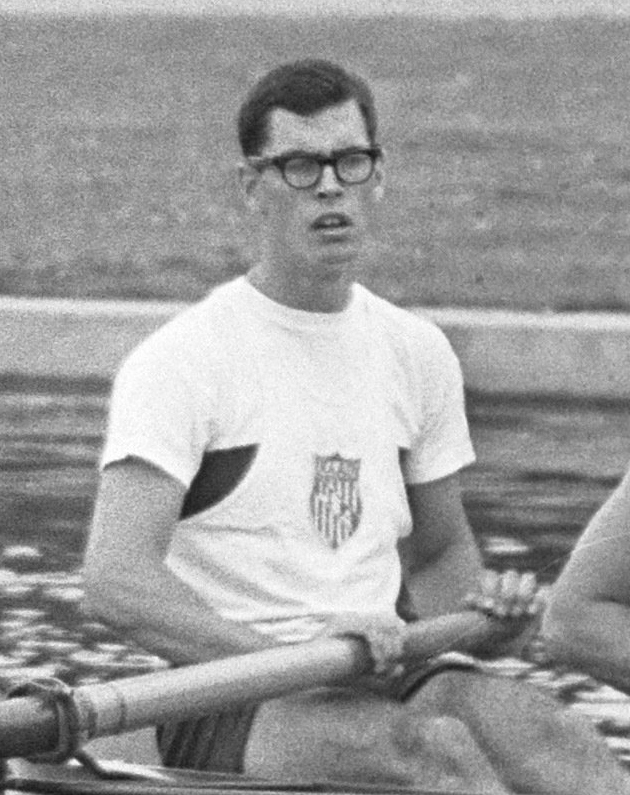
- Foley at the 1964 European Championships

Personal information
- Full name: Hugh Miller Foley
- Born: March 3, 1944 Seattle, Washington, U.S.
- Died: November 9, 2016 (aged 72)
- Education: La Salle University
- Height: 191 cm (6 ft 3 in)
- Weight: 86 kg (190 lb)

Sport
- Sport: Rowing
- Club: Vesper Boat Club
Medal record
Representing the United States
Olympic Games
Gold medal – first place	1964 Tokyo	Eight
Pan American Games
Gold medal – first place	1967 Winnipeg	Coxed four
European Rowing Championships
Bronze medal – third place	1965 Duisburg	Eight
Bronze medal – third place	1967 Vichy	Coxless four

Hugh Miller Foley (March 3, 1944 – November 9, 2016) was an American rower. Competing in the eights he won an Olympic gold medal in 1964 and a bronze medal at the 1965 European Championships. He also won a gold in the coxed fours at the 1967 Pan American Games. During his career, Foley won a total of six national titles in the fours and eights.

Foley was born in Seattle, but was raised in Martin City, Montana, where his father worked as a forester and a farmer. In 1962, Foley enrolled to Loyola Marymount University in Los Angeles, but then transferred to La Salle University in Philadelphia, graduating in 1966 in accounting. He joined the Vesper Boat Club there around 1963. He remained active in rowing after retiring from competitions, and coached at Boston University in the 1970s, but later became a financial advisor in Eugene, Oregon. His Olympic medal was stolen from his home in 1996, but was recovered by the police.

== Cited sources ==
- William A Stowe (2005). All Together. iUniverse. ISBN 978-0-595-34388-1.
