= Vesper Boat Club =

American rowing club in Philadelphia

Coordinates: 39.96962°N 75.18527°W

- Location: #10 Boathouse Row, Philadelphia, Pennsylvania, U.S.A.
- Home water: Schuylkill River
- Established: 1865
- Navy admission: 1870 (reinstated 1879)
- Former names: Washington Barge Club
- Key people: Gregory Ansolabehere (President)
- Colors: Crimson and Battleship
- Affiliations: Friends Select, Sacred Heart, and La Salle University
- Website: vesperboatclub.org
- Vesper Boat Club
- U.S. Historic district – Contributing property
- Philadelphia Register of Historic Places
- Location within Pennsylvania Location within the United States
- Location: Philadelphia, Pennsylvania
- Part of: Vesper Boat Club (ID87000821)
- Added to NRHP: February 27, 1987

The Vesper Boat Club is an amateur rowing club located at #10 Boathouse Row in the historic Boathouse Row of Philadelphia, Pennsylvania. Founded in 1865 as the Washington Barge Club, the club's name was changed to Vesper Boat Club in 1870.

== History ==
The Vesper Boat Club had its beginning on Feb. 22, 1865 – a decade into the flourishing of rowing clubs on Philadelphia's Schuylkill River – with the founding of the Washington Barge Club. Five years later, on Jan 1, 1870, its name was changed to Vesper Boat Club.

Vesper's eight-oared shell took the gold medal in Paris at the 1900 Summer Olympics. The Vesper eight repeated its victory at the 1904 games in St. Louis. And at the 1964 Tokyo Olympics, Vesper's eight won again, making it the only rowing club in the United States to win the title three times.

Perhaps the best-known names associated with the Vesper Club are John B. Kelly Sr., an Irish-American brickworks owner who became influential in city politics and his son, John B. Kelly Jr., a city councilman and brother to Princess Grace of Monaco.

Kelly Sr. won Olympic Gold in the single scull in 1920. He also won gold medals in the double scull in 1920 and in 1924, both times with his cousin Paul Costello. As a laborer Kelly was barred from entering the 1920 Diamond Sculls at the Royal Henley Regatta.

It was two decades later that John B. Kelly Jr. would win that event, in 1947 and 1949. Kelly Jr. won the national singles championship eight times. At the time of his death in 1985, he. was president of the United States Olympic Committee.

Under the coaching of Jim Manning, Dr. Charles W. Riggall, Allan Rosenberg and Dietrich Rose, many other Vesper members have gone on to win national and international races.

After a century of accomplishments for the men, Vesper in 1970 became the first men's club to organize a women's rowing team. (Philadelphia Girls Rowing Club in 1968 pioneered women's rowing in the United States.)

Vesper women have consistently won national championships and have regularly represented the United States in international competition. At the Montreal Olympics in 1976, six Vesper members were on the USA Olympic Rowing Team.

== Boathouse ==
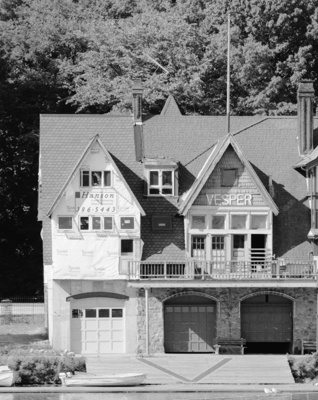
Vesper Boat Club, #10 Boathouse Row, 1972

The present clubhouse was constructed in combination with neighboring Malta Boat Club, with the Vesper cornerstone dated 1865. The first building was completed in 1865. The boathouse was designed by noted Philadelphia architect G.H. Hewitt. The architecture—semi-attached ornamental Victorian Gothic—is typical of that period and members who were tradesmen constructed the original building with local building materials. The second boat bay addition was in 1898, and the last was completed in the early 1960s.

In 1873, Vesper, in conjunction with Malta Boat Club, built a 1 1/2-story boat house. In 1898, a second floor and addition were added to Vesper, and other renovations have recently been completed. Howard Egar designed the 1898 alterations and additions to the Vesper Boat Club.

== Prominent members ==
- Harry Parker - 1960 US Olympic Team and US Olympic Coach 1964–1984
- Allen Rosenberg - rower and US Olympic rowing coach
- Kenneth Dreyfuss - 1976 US Olympic Team
- C. Hugh Stevenson – 1976 US Olympic Team
- James E. Moroney III - 1972 & 1976 US Olympic Teams
- Anita Defrantz - 1976 and 1980 Olympic Team. Sued the United States for the 1980 boycott. IOC Vice President.
- Michiel Bartman - 2009 and 2007 US National Team Coaching Staff
- Dan Scholz - 2009 US National Team member (Lightweight Men's Quadruple Sculls)
- Julie Nichols - 2008 US Olympic Team member (Alternate)
- Josh Inman - 2008 US Olympic Team and 2007 US National Team member (Stroke in Men's Eight)
- Libby (Elizabeth) Peters - 2008 US National Team member (Women's Lightweight Quadruple Sculls)
- Wendy Tripician - 2007 US National Team member (Women's Lightweight Double Sculls)
- Jana Heere - 2007 US National Team member (Women's Lightweight Double Sculls)
- Hannah Moore - 2007 US National Team member (Women's Lightweight Quadruple Sculls)
- Carey Brezler - 2007 US National Team member (Women's Lightweight Quadruple Sculls)
- Mary Jones - 2015, 2016, 2017, 2018 US National Team member (Pan Am Games Women's Lightweight Single Sculls Gold Medalist, World Championship Women's Lightweight Single Sculls, World Championship Women's Lightweight Double Sculls, Silver Medalist. )
- Grace Latz - 2014, 2015, 2016, 2017 US National Team Member and 2016 Olympian.
- Julia Lonchar - 2019 US National Team Member (Pan Am Games Women's Double Sculls, silver. Women's Quadruple Sculls, bronze )
- Zachary Heese - 2018 Under 23 US National Team Member (Men's Lightweight Single Sculls), 2019 US National Team Member (Men's Lightweight Quadruple Sculls), 2021 US Olympic Trials (1st place, Men's Lightweight Double Sculls)
- Jasper Liu - 2019 US National Team Member (Men's Lightweight Quadruple Sculls), 2021 US Olympic Trials (1st place, Men's Lightweight Double Sculls)
- Kieran Edwards - 2019 Under 23 US National Team Member (Men's Lightweight Quadruple Sculls)
- Michelle Sechser - 2012, 2013, 2014, 2015, 2016, 2017, 2018, 2019 US National Team Member (Women's Lightweight Single Sculls, Quadruple Sculls, Double Sculls - bronze medalist), 2021 US Olympic Trials (1st place, Women's Lightweight Double Sculls)
- Solveig Imsdahl - 2012 Under 23 US National Team (Women's Lightweight Quadruple Sculls), 2019 Pan Am Games US National Team (Women's Coxless Pair. Women's Quadruple Sculls, bronze)
- Elizabeth Euiler - 2019 Pan American Games US National Team (Women's Coxless Pair)
- Jonathan Kierkegaard - 2017 US National Team Member (Men's Quadruple Sculls), Henley Royal Regatta (Men's Quadruple Sculls, gold medalist), 2021 Us Olympic Trials (1st place, Men's Double Sculls)
- Logan Smith - 2019 Pan American Games US National Team (Men's Coxless Pair, Men's 8+)
- James Garay - 2019 Pan American Games US National Team (Men's Coxless Pair, Men's 8+)
- Katherine McFetridge - 2015 Pan American Games (Women's Single Sculls, gold)
- Nicole Ritchie - 2015 Pan American Games (Women's Double Sculls, silver. Women's Quadruple Sculls, silver)
- Lindsay Meyer- 2008 US Olympic Team (Women's Quadruple Sculls), 2015 Pan American Games (Women's Double Sculls, silver. Women's Quadruple Sculls, silver)

== Olympic medalists ==
- Louis Abell- gold medalist 1900 and 1904
- John Exley - gold medalist 1900 and 1904
- James Juvenal - gold medalist 1900 and silver medalist 1904
- Edward Marsh - gold medalist 1900
- Harry Lott - 1904 gold medalist
- Stanley Cwiklinski - 1964 Eights gold medalist
- Hugh Foley - 1964 Eights gold medalist
- Gene Clapp - 1972 Men's eights silver medalist
- John B. Kelly Jr. - Bronze medal 1956. Also competed in 1948, 1952, and 1960.
- Bill Maher - 1968 Men's Double Sculls bronze medal. Rowed for VBC in 1969.

== See also ==
- John B. Kelly Sr.
- John Strotbeck, Jr.
- John Timoney
