= Rowing at the 1964 Summer Olympics – Men's double sculls =

Men's double sculls at the Games of the XVIII Olympiad
- Venue: Toda Rowing Course
- Date: 12–15 October 1964
- Winning time: 7:10.66

Medalists
1st place, gold medalist(s)		Oleg Tyurin; Boris Dubrovskiy	Soviet Union
2nd place, silver medalist(s)		Seymour Cromwell; Jim Storm	United States
3rd place, bronze medalist(s)		Vladimír Andrs; Pavel Hofmann	Czechoslovakia

The double sculls event was a rowing event conducted as part of the 1964 Summer Olympics programme.

== Medallists ==
Gold	Silver	Bronze
Oleg Tyurin; Boris Dubrovskiy (URS)	Seymour Cromwell; Jim Storm (USA)	Vladimír Andrs; Pavel Hofmann (TCH)

== Results ==
=== Heats ===
The top crew in each heat advanced to the final, with all others sent to the repechages.

Heat 1
1.	Seymour Cromwell and Jim Storm (USA)	6:31.63	QF
2.	Helmut Lebert and Josef Steffes-Mies (EUA)	6:41.24	QR
3.	Melchior Bürgin and Martin Studach (SUI)	6:45.58	QR
4.	Arnold Cooke and Peter Webb (GBR)	6:49.83	QR
5.	Barclay Wade and Gary Pearce (AUS)	7:01.21	QR
Heat 2
1.	Oleg Tyurin and Boris Dubrovskiy (URS)	6:51.03	QF
2.	Max Alwin and Peter Bots (NED)	7:07.52	QR
3.	Susumi Hosoya and Yasushi Murase (JPN)	7:25.64	QR
4.	Roberto Friedrich and Fernando Scheffler (MEX)	7:34.34	QR
Heat 3
1.	Vladimír Andrs and Pavel Hofmann (TCH)	6:39.67	QF
2.	M. de Meulemeester and Gerard Higny (BEL)	6:45.69	QR
3.	René Duhamel and Bernard Monnereau (FRA)	6:48.70	QR
4.	Juan Carlos Gómez and José María Robledo (ARG)	6:58.08	QR

==== Repechages ====
The top finisher in each of the three repechages joined the finalists. The second and third-place finishers competed in a consolation final for 7th-12th places. The fourth-place finisher, in the only repechage with that many competitors, was eliminated.

Repechage 1
1.	Melchir Burgin and Martin Studach (SUI)	6:47.18	QF
2.	M. de Meulemeester and Gerard Higny (BEL)	6:49.28	QC
3.	Roberto Friedrich and Fernando Scheffler (MEX)	7:35.14	QC
Repechage 2
1.	Helmut Lebert and Josef Steffes-Mies (EUA)	6:39.92	QF
2.	Juan Gomez and Jose Robledo (ARG)	7:05.02	QC
3.	Hosoya Susumu and Murase Yasushi (JPN)	7:18.98	QC
Repechage 3
1.	René Duhamel and Bernard Monnereau (FRA)	6:49.38	QF
2.	Arnold Cooke and Peter Webb (GBR)	6:50.48	QC
3.	Max Alwin and Peter Bots (NED)	6:56.59	QC
4.	Barclay Wade and Gary Pearce (AUS)	7:07.12	13th

=== Consolation final ===
The consolation final determined places from 7th to 12th.

7.	Arnold Cooke and Peter Webb (GBR)	6:44.39
8.	Max Alwin and Peter Bots (NED)	6:47.07
9.	M. de Meulemeester and Gerard Higny (BEL)	6:49.70
10.	Hosoya Susumu and Murase Yasushi (JPN)	7:15.22
11.	Roberto Friedrich and Fernando Scheffler (MEX)	7:27.47
12.	Juan Gomez and Jose Robledo (ARG)	Did not start

=== Final ===
	Oleg Tyurin and Boris Dubrovskiy (URS)	7:10.66
	Seymour Cromwell and Jim Storm (USA)	7:13.16
	Vladimír Andrs and Pavel Hofmann (TCH)	7:14.23
4.	Melchior Burgin and Martin Studach (SUI)	7:24.97
5.	Helmut Lebert and Josef Steffes-Mies (EUA)	7:30.03
6.	René Duhamel and Bernard Monnereau (FRA)	7:41.80

== Sources ==
- Tokyo Organizing Committee (1964). The Games of the XVIII Olympiad: Tokyo 1964, vol. 2.
