= Kuttelwascher =

Kuttelwascher is a German surname meaning "tripe washer". Notable people include:

- Dietmar Kuttelwascher, Austrian rower
- Helmuth Kuttelwascher, Austrian rower
- Horst Kuttelwascher, Austrian rower
- Karel Kuttelwascher, Czech fighter pilot
- Karel Kutlvašr, Czech general
- Otto Kuttelwascher, Austrian Righteous Among the Nations
- Volkmar Kuttelwascher, Austrian rower
