= Frank Steinhäuser =

German rower

Sport
- Sport: Rowing
- Club: RC Nassovia Höchst
Medal record
Men's rowing
Representing West Germany
World Rowing Championships
| Gold medal – first place | 1962 Lucerne | Coxed pair |
European Championships
| Gold medal – first place | 1963 Copenhagen | Coxed pair |

Frank Steinhäuser is a German coxswain.

Steinhäuser coxed for Wolfgang Neuß and Klaus-Günter Jordan from 1962 to 1964. In 1962, they won the gold medal at the West German national championships, qualifying for the inaugural World Rowing Championships. At the 1962 World Rowing Championships in Lucerne, they became the first world championship titleholders in the coxed pair. They continued their success by winning the title again at the 1963 West German national championships. However, in the 1964 West German national championships, they finished in third place.

Steinhäuser is a member of RC Nassovia Höchst, and in 2012, he was awarded a prize for 50 years of membership at the rowing club.
