= Barclay Wade =

Australian rower (1944–2021)

Personal information
- Nationality: Australian
- Born: 5 April 1944 Sydney, Australia
- Died: 26 December 2021 (aged 77)

Sport
- Sport: Rowing
Medal record
Representing Australia
British Empire Games
Bronze medal – third place	1962 Perth	Men's Double Scull

Barclay John Wade (5 April 1944 – 26 December 2021) was an Australian representative rower. His first national championship title and a Commonwealth Games bronze medal were won at age eighteen and two years later he competed in the men's double sculls event at the 1964 Summer Olympics.

== Rowing career ==
Barclay Wade was educated at Shore School where he took up rowing. He rowed in the victorious Head of the River Shore first VIII of 1961 and while still at school began sculling from the Mosman Rowing Club.

Just turned eighteen he competed in Haberfield Club colours at the inaugural Australian Rowing Championships of 1962 and won the first Australian title in a double scull with Ian Tutty. He was then selected in a double scull with Tasmania's Graeme Squires to compete at the 1962 Commonwealth Games. They won a bronze medal. In 1963 he was the New South Wales state champion single sculler.

In 1964 he partnered up with Gary Pearce of the Balmain Rowing Club in a composite double and won the national title in the men's double scull at the second ever Australian Rowing Championships. This was a selection regatta for the Tokyo Olympics and Wade and Pearce were selected as the Olympic representative double. In Tokyo they finished 13th in the double sculls event.

He died on 26 December 2021, at the age of 77.
