= Boris Dubrovsky =

Boris Dubrovsky may refer to:

- Boris Dubrovskiy (1939–2023), Russian rower
- Boris Dubrovsky (politician) (born 1958), Russian politician and CEO of the Magnitogorsk Iron and Steel Works
