= Jim Storm =

Jim Storm may refer to:

- Jim Storm (actor) (born 1943), American actor
- Jim Storm (rower) (born 1941), American rower
- Jim Storm (ice hockey) (born 1971), ice hockey player

== See also ==
- James Storm, American professional wrestler
