= Lidiya Zontova =

Russian athlete (born 1936)

Personal information
- Born: 24 February 1936 (age 90) Moscow, Russia

Sport
- Sport: Rowing
- Club: Kryl'ya Sovetov, Trud
Medal record
Representing the Soviet Union
European Rowing Championships
Gold medal – first place	1955 Bucharest	Quad sculls
Gold medal – first place	1956 Bled	Quad sculls
Gold medal – first place	1957 Duisburg	Coxed four
Gold medal – first place	1958 Poznań	Eight
Gold medal – first place	1959 Mâcon	Eight
Gold medal – first place	1960 London	Eight
Gold medal – first place	1961 Prague	Eight
Gold medal – first place	1962 East Berlin	Eight

Lidiya Petrovna Zontova (Russian: Лидия Петровна Зонтова, born 24 February 1936) is a Russian retired rower who won eight European titles between 1955 and 1962. For these achievements she was awarded the Order of the Badge of Honour. After retiring from competitions she worked as engineer at the MAMI Moscow State Technical University.
