= Murase =

Murase (written: 村瀬) is a Japanese surname. Notable people with the surname include:

- Ayumu Murase (村瀬 歩, born 1988), Japanese voice actor
- Kazutaka Murase (村瀬 和隆, born 1985), Japanese footballer
- Michiyo Murase (村瀬 迪与), Japanese actress and voice actress
- Robert Murase (1938–2005), American landscape architect
- Sachiko Murase (村瀬 幸子, 1905–1993), Japanese actress
- Sae Murase (村瀬 紗英, born 1997), Japanese idol and singer
- Shūkō Murase (村瀬 修功, born 1964), Japanese anime director and animator
- Yasushi Murase (村瀬 康, born 1941), Japanese rower
