= Brigitte Rintisch =

East German rower

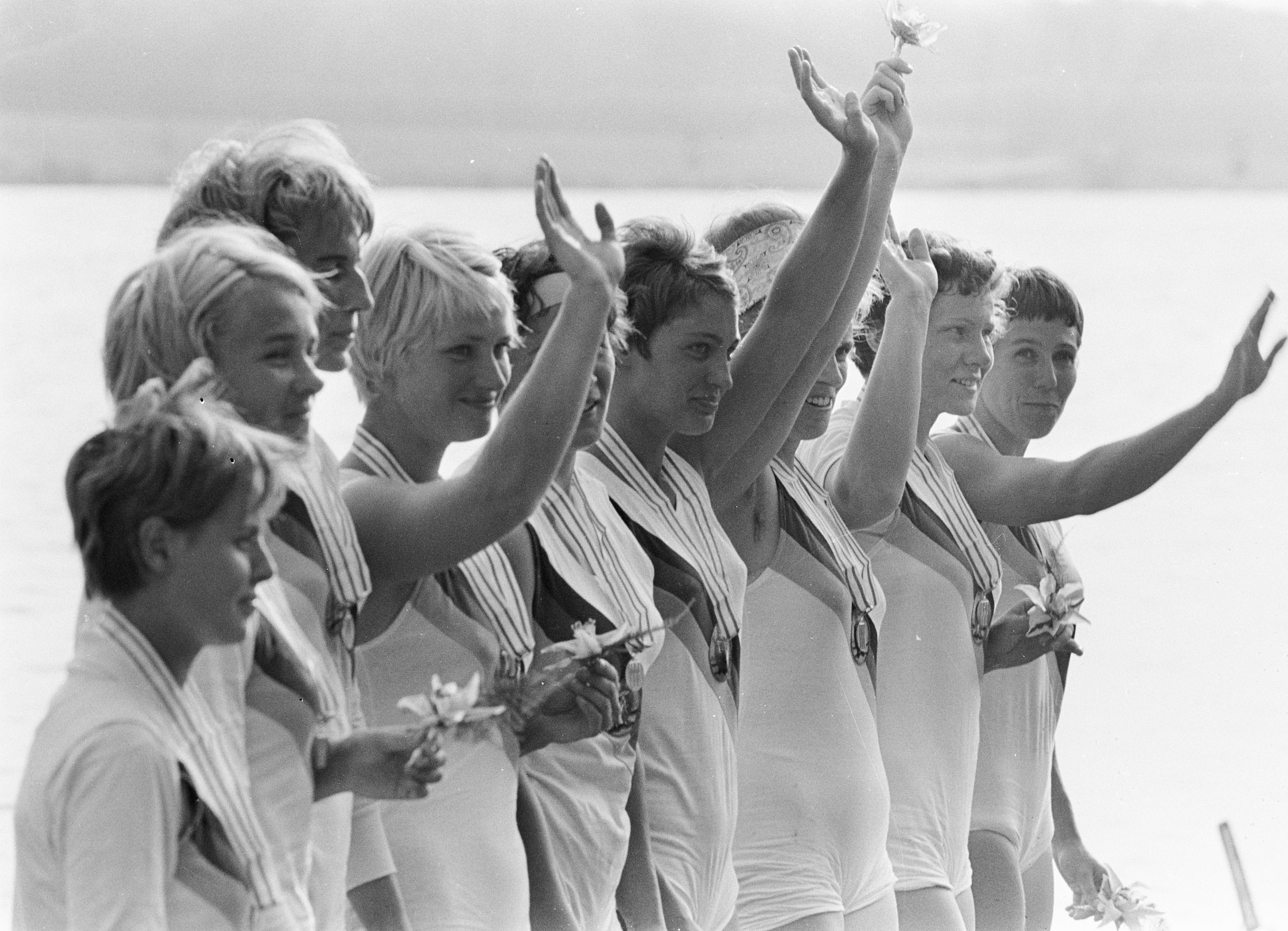
- Rintisch (3rd from left) at the 1966 European Championships

Sport
- Sport: Rowing
- Club: SC Dynamo Berlin
Medal record
Women's rowing
Representing East Germany
European Rowing Championships
Silver medal – second place	1961 Prague	Eight
Bronze medal – third place	1962 East Berlin	Coxed four
Silver medal – second place	1963 Moscow	Eight
Gold medal – first place	1964 Amsterdam	Eight
Gold medal – first place	1966 Amsterdam	Eight

Brigitte Rintisch is a retired East German rower who won two gold, two silver and one bronze medals at the European championships of 1961–1966. After marrying between 1964 and 1966 she competed as Brigitte Butze.
