= Günther Zumkeller =

German rower

Sport
- Sport: Rowing
- Club: RV Neptun Konstanz
Medal record
Men's rowing
Representing West Germany
World Rowing Championships
Gold medal – first place	1962 Lucerne	Coxless pair
European Championships
Gold medal – first place	1961 Prague	Coxless pair
Silver medal – second place	1963 Copenhagen	Coxless pair

Günther Zumkeller is a German rower who represented West Germany.

== Rowing career ==
Zumkeller is a member of RV Neptun Konstanz, a rowing club based at Lake Constance near the border with Switzerland. For the 1961 rowing season, he teamed up with Dieter Bender in the coxless pair cause a sensation at their first regatta in Mannheim when they came second, by just 0.1 seconds, to the 1960 Olympic gold medallists in the coxed pair, Bernhard Knubel and Heinz Renneberg. Later that year, Zumkeller and Bender won the national championships in West Germany. This qualified them for the 1961 European Rowing Championships, where they won a gold medal in this boat class. In 1962, the again won at the national championships. This qualified the pair for the 1962 World Rowing Championships in Lucerne where they won a gold medal in the same boat class. In 1963, Zumkeller and Bender won the national championships for a third time in succession. As the International Rowing Federation (FISA) did not recognise East Germany as a country and insisted on one German team per boat class at international regattas, selection trials had to be held for the 1963 European Rowing Championships. Zumkeller and Bender won their selection trial against Jörg Lucke and Heinz-Jürgen Bothe by just 0.05 seconds. At the 1963 European Championships, Zumkeller and Bender won silver, beaten by the team from Italy.

At the 1964 national championships, Zumkeller and Bender came third. The winners of the national championships, Michael Schwan and Wolfgang Hottenrott, went on to become the German representatives in the coxless pair at the 1964 Summer Olympics in Tokyo. Zumkeller and Bender separated after the 1964 nationals, and Zumkeller joined Klaus-Günter Jordan to form a coxed pair. Jordan had previously been national champion in this boat class (1961 to 1963). They concentrated on getting the Olympic nomination for the United Team of Germany and did thus not go to the 1964 European Rowing Championships in Amsterdam. The European champions from Amsterdam were the East Germans Peter Gorny and Günter Bergau, with Karl-Heinz Danielowski as their cox. In the qualification race, the East Germans were in the lead and the West German team was catching up, but with 200 m to go, Jordan caught a crab. East German media claimed that even without this mishap, the East German team would still have won. In 1966, Zumkeller continued to row with Klaus-Günter Jordan in the coxed pair (the cox that year was Burkhard Zwosta), and they took out the title that year. This qualified them for the 1966 World Rowing Championships in Bled where they came in sixth place in the final.

== Awards ==
For their 1961 European Championship title, Zumkeller and Bender received the Silbernes Lorbeerblatt (Silver Laurel Leaf), the highest sports award in Germany. For its centenary in 1985, RV Neptun Konstanz established an honorary membership for those who have made significant contributions to the rowing club. Zumkeller was one of nine members elevated to this status.
