= 1955 European Rowing Championships =

1955 European Rowing Championships may refer to:

- 1955 European Rowing Championships (women)
- 1955 European Rowing Championships (men)
