= 1962 European Rowing Championships =

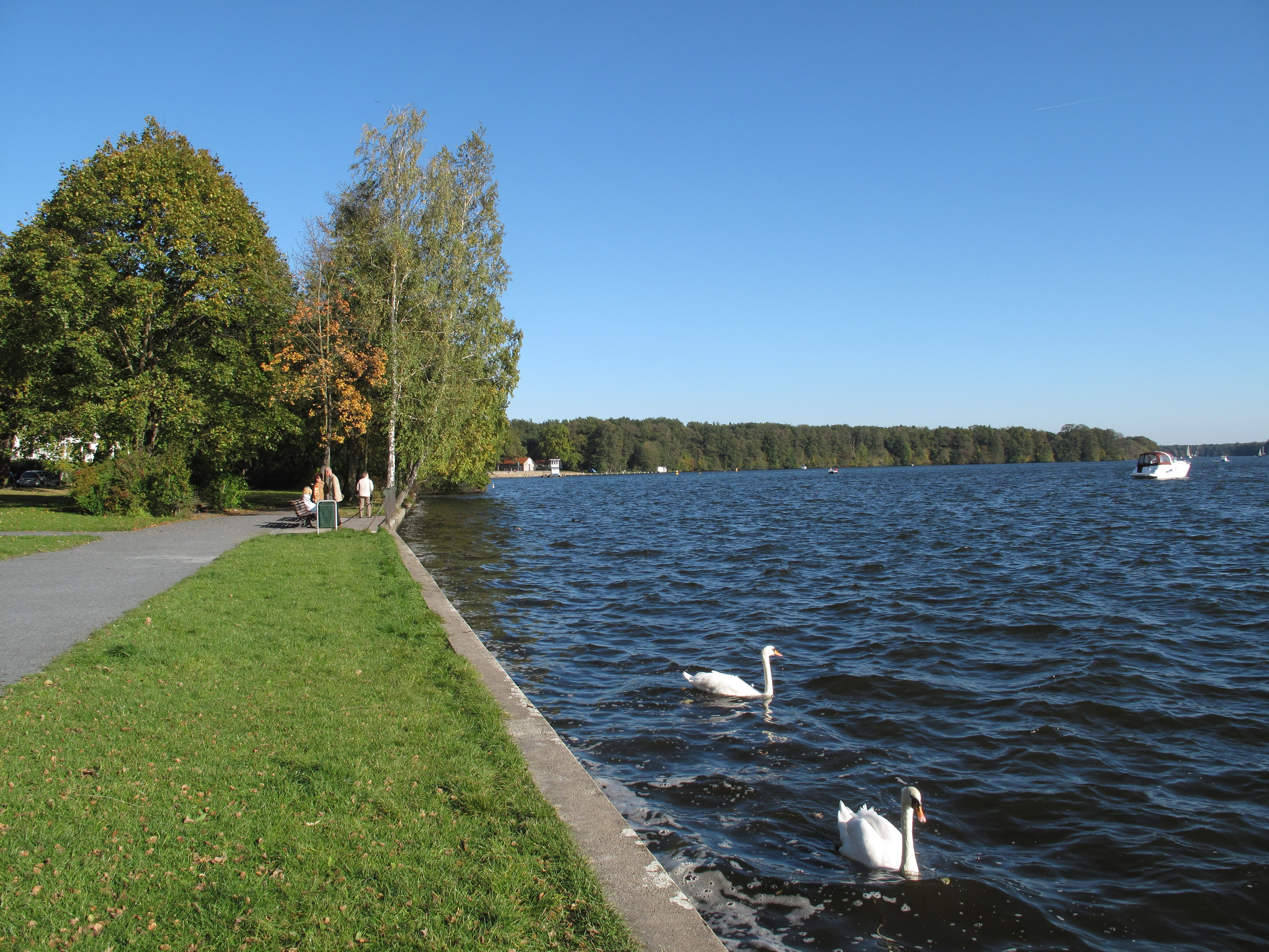
- View of Langer See
- Venue: Grünau Regatta Course on the Langer See
- Location: Grünau, East Berlin, East Germany
- Dates: 17–19 August 1962
- Nations: 11

The 1962 European Rowing Championships were rowing championships held on the Langer See in the East Berlin suburb of Grünau in East Germany; the venue had previously been used for the 1936 Summer Olympics. This edition of the European Rowing Championships was for women only and was held from 17 to 19 August. Eleven countries contested five boat classes (W1x, W2x, W4x+, W4+, W8+). Men would three weeks later meet in Lucerne for the inaugural World Rowing Championships.

== German participation ==
The rowing federations of East and West Germany met in July to discuss how their rowers should be represented. FISA did not recognise East Germany as a country and insisted on one German team per boat class. For women's rowing, the West German rowing federation did not want selection trials to be held and preferred that East German crews attend the event; this reflected the dominance of the East German women. For the men who were to compete at the inaugural World Rowing Championships in Switzerland some weeks later, selection trials were agreed on.

== Medal summary – women's events ==
A Romanian crew was entered for both the coxed four and the coxed quad sculls. They asked the British crew, who had a room in the boat house adjacent to the regatta course, whether they could use their beds between the finals races. Having won bronze in the coxed four, the Romanians were given "Vitamin C" injections by their doctors while using the British accommodation; or so they told their hosts. The Romanian crew went on to win gold in the coxed quad sculls.

Event	Gold		Silver		Bronze	
Event	Country & rowers	Time	Country & rowers	Time	Country & rowers	Time
W1x	Czechoslovakia; Alena Postlová	4:17.0	Great Britain; Penny Chuter	4:20.9	Soviet Union; Galina Samorodova	4:25.1
W2x	Soviet Union; Valentina Kalegina; Galina Vecherkovskaya	4:08.1	East Germany; Hannelore Göttlich; Helga Kolbe	4:08.4	Romania; Ana Tamas; Florica Ghiuzelea	4:11.8
W4+	Romania; Florica Ghiuzelea; Emilia Rigard; Ana Tamas; Iuliana Bulugioiu; Stefania Borisov (cox)	4:03.1	Soviet Union; Valentina Terekhova; Nadeschda Tuberosova; Ella Sergeyeva; Nina Shamanova; Valentina Timofeyeva (cox)	4:05.2	East Germany; Hilde Amelang; Ingrid Graf; Brigitte Rintisch; Marianne Mewes; Elfriede Boetius (cox)	4:13.8
W4x+	Soviet Union; Ljudmila Suslova; Nelli Chernova; Aino Pajusalu; Nina Polyakova; Valentina Timofeyeva (cox)	3:34.3	East Germany; Veronika Neumann; Hannelore Göttlich; Monika Sommer; Helga Kolbe; Christa Böhm (cox)	3:47.4	Romania; Florica Ghiuzelea; Emilia Rigard; Ana Tamas; Iuliana Bulugioiu; Stefania Borisov (cox)	3:49.4
W8+	Soviet Union; Nina Korobkova; Vera Rebrova; Nonna Petsernikova; Lidiya Zontova; Lyubov Isayeva; Valentina Sirsikova; Zinaida Korotova; Nadeschda Gontsarova; Viktoriya Dobrodeeva (cox)	3:32.0	East Germany; Erika Kretzschmer; Helga Ammon; Brigitte Amm; Ute Gabler; Hanna Vesper; Christiane Münzberg; Barbara Reichel; Christa Schollain; Karla Frister (cox)	3:35.7	Czechoslovakia; Jana Bruzova; Vera Smalclova; Venceslava Pekarkova; Jana Psotova; Jana Knirova; Jitka Slezingerova; Ludmila Zartova; Milena Kafkova; Eliska Hledikova (cox)	3:37.3

== Medals table ==
Rank	Nation	Gold	Silver	Bronze	Total
1	Soviet Union (URS)	3	1	1	5
2	Romania (ROU)	1	0	2	3
3	Czechoslovakia (TCH)	1	0	1	2
4	East Germany (GDR)	0	3	1	4
5	Great Britain (GBR)	0	1	0	1
6	Hungary (HUN)	0	0	0	0
Totals (6 entries)		5	5	5	15
