= Frister =

Frister is a surname. Notable people with the surname include:

- Roman Frister (1928–2015), Polish writer
- Karla Frister, German rower
