= Valentina Timofeyeva =

Soviet coxswain

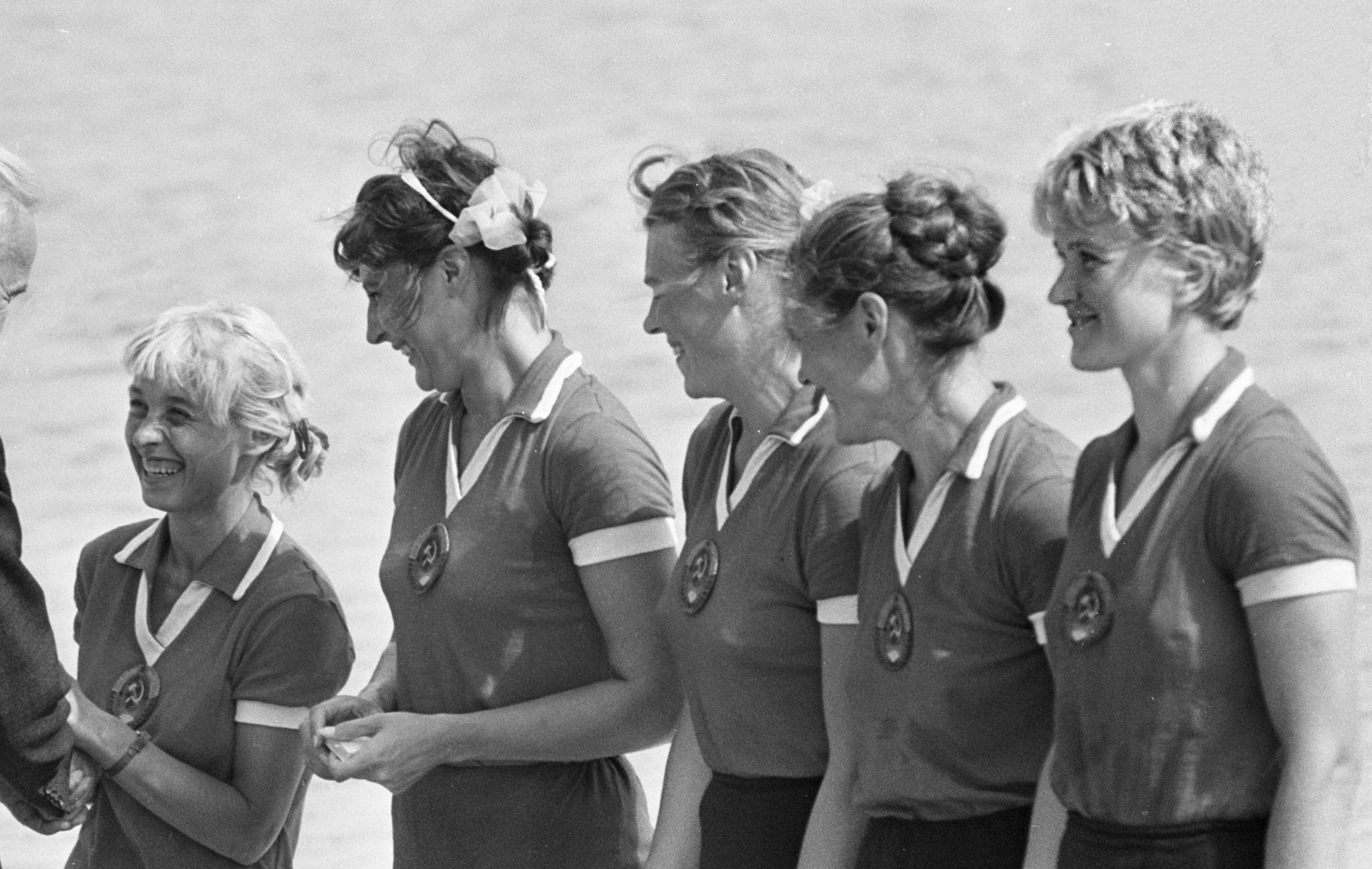
- Soviet coxed four at the 1964 European Championships, Timofeyeva is first from left

Personal information
- Born: 1 February 1937 (age 89) Moscow, Soviet Union

Sport
- Sport: Rowing
Medal record
Representing the Soviet Union
European Rowing Championships
Gold medal – first place	1960 London	Coxed four
Gold medal – first place	1961 Prague	Coxed four
Gold medal – first place	1962 East Berlin	Quad scull
Silver medal – second place	1962 East Berlin	Coxed four
Gold medal – first place	1963 Moscow	Coxed four
Gold medal – first place	1964 Amsterdam	Coxed four
Silver medal – second place	1964 Amsterdam	Eight

Valentina Timofeyeva (Russian: Валентина Тимофеева; born 1 February 1937) is a retired Soviet coxswain who won five European titles between 1960 and 1964, often competing in two events at the same championships.
