= Valentina Terekhova =

Russian rower

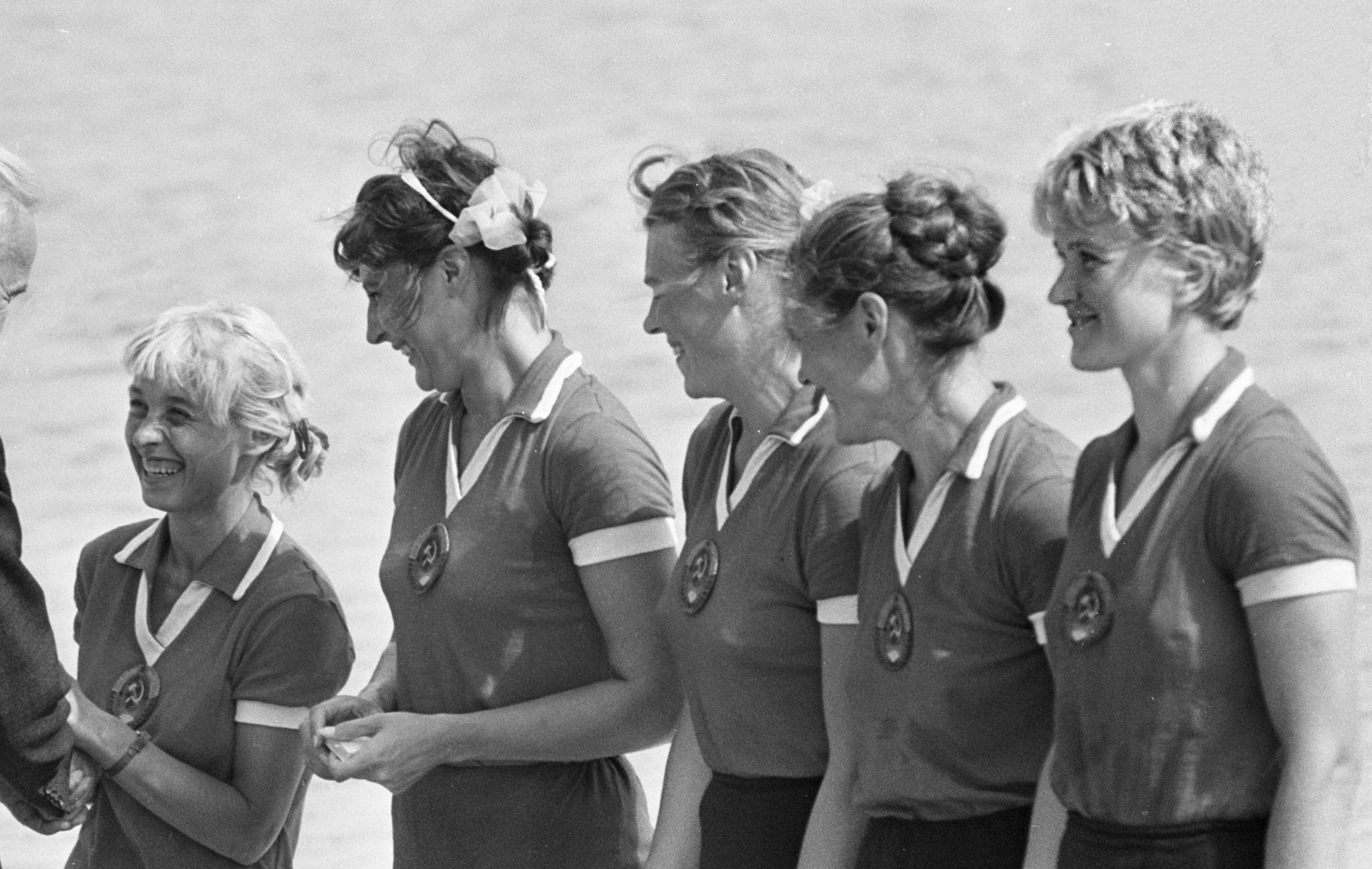
- Soviet coxed four at the 1964 European Championships, Terekhova is probably second from right

Sport
- Sport: Rowing
Medal record
Representing the Soviet Union
European Rowing Championships
Gold medal – first place	1958 Poznań	Coxed four
Gold medal – first place	1959 Mâcon	Coxed four
Gold medal – first place	1960 London	Coxed four
Gold medal – first place	1961 Prague	Coxed four
Silver medal – second place	1962 East Berlin	Coxed four
Gold medal – first place	1963 Moscow	Coxed four
Gold medal – first place	1964 Amsterdam	Coxed four

Valentina Terekhova (Russian: Валентина Терехова) is a retired Russian rower who won six European titles in the coxed fours between 1958 and 1964.
