= Susumi Hosoya =

Japanese rower (born 1942)

Personal information
- Nationality: Japanese
- Born: 25 February 1942 (age 83)

Sport
- Sport: Rowing

Susumi Hosoya (細谷 進, Hosoya Susumi, born 25 February 1942) is a Japanese rower. He competed in the men's double sculls event at the 1964 Summer Olympics.
