= Peter Webb (rower) =

British rower

Personal information
- Born: Peter James Webb; 2 October 1940
- Died: 27 May 1993 (aged 52)
- Education: Monkton Combe School; Queens' College, Cambridge

Sport
- Sport: Rowing
- Club: Nottingham & Union Rowing Club
Medal record
Representing the United Kingdom
European Rowing Championships
Silver medal – second place	1964 Amsterdam	Double sculls

Peter James Webb (2 October 1940 – 27 May 1993) was a British rower. Webb competed for Great Britain in the 1964 Olympics in Tokyo. He rowed with Arnold Cooke in the men's double sculls, finishing in seventh place.

He died of cancer in May 1993, aged 52.
