= Galina Vecherkovskaya =

Soviet rower

Personal information
- Born: 27 June 1926 (age 100) Leningrad, Russian SFSR, Soviet Union

Sport
- Sport: Rowing
Medal record
Representing the Soviet Union
European Rowing Championships
Gold medal – first place	1955 Bucharest	Coxed four
Gold medal – first place	1956 Bled	Coxed four
Gold medal – first place	1959 Mâcon	Quad sculls
Gold medal – first place	1961 Prague	Double sculls
Gold medal – first place	1962 East Berlin	Double sculls

Galina Yanovna Vecherkovskaya (also Putyrskaya, Russian: Галина Яновна Вечерковская (Путырская), born 27 June 1926) is a Soviet retired rower who won five European titles between 1955 and 1962.

Vecherkovskaya was born in Leningrad, but during World War II her family lived in Ryazan Oblast. Her father, Jan Kazimirovich, was an engineer who was executed during the Great Purge in late 1930s. Vecherkovskaya started training in rowing in 1947, when she enrolled to the Lesgaft Institute of Physical Education (GDOIFK). She graduated in 1951 and until 1984 lectured at GDOIFK; after that, between 1984 and 1997 she worked as a physician at a city hospital for children. Around 1948 Vecherkovskaya married her coach, Kirill Putyrsky, and for some time competed under his name as Galina Putyrskaya; they divorced around 1960.

Before the 1955 European Championships, Vecherkovskaya and her partner Olimpiada Mikhaylova were medal favorites in double sculls. However, two rowers of the Soviet coxed four became pregnant, and to save the team Vecherkovskaya and Mikhailova were merged into the coxed four that resulted in a gold medal.
