= Alena Postlová =

Czech rower (1939–2005)

Personal information
- Born: 24 March 1939 Prague, Czechoslovakia
- Died: 13 May 2005 (aged 66)
- Height: 175 cm (5 ft 9 in)
- Weight: 62 kg (137 lb)
- Spouse: Pavel Kvasil (divorced)

Sport
- Sport: Rowing
Medal record
Women's rowing
Representing Czechoslovakia
European Championships
| Silver medal – second place | 1960 London | Double sculls |
| Silver medal – second place | 1961 Prague | Single sculls |
| Gold medal – first place | 1962 East Berlin | Single sculls |
| Silver medal – second place | 1964 Amsterdam | Double sculls |
| Bronze medal – third place | 1964 Amsterdam | Single sculls |
| Silver medal – second place | 1965 Duisburg | Double sculls |
| Silver medal – second place | 1966 Amsterdam | Single sculls |
| Silver medal – second place | 1967 Vichy | Single sculls |
| Silver medal – second place | 1969 Klagenfurt | Double sculls |

Alena Postlová (later Alena Kvasilová–Postlová; 24 March 1939 – 13 May 2005) was a Czech rower who competed for Czechoslovakia. She won the 1962 European Rowing Championships in single sculls. She competed at European Rowing Championships between 1959 and 1970 in single and double sculls. At the 1963 European Rowing Championships in Moscow, she capsized in the final.
