= Dieter Bender =

German rower (born 1940)

Personal information
- Born: 20 May 1940 (age 86)

Sport
- Sport: Rowing
Medal record
Men's rowing
Representing Germany
World Rowing Championships
Gold medal – first place	1962 Lucerne	Coxless pair
European Rowing Championships
Gold medal – first place	1961 Prague	Coxless pair
Silver medal – second place	1963 Copenhagen	Coxless pair

Dieter Bender (born 20 May 1940) is a German rower.

At the 1961 European Rowing Championships, he won a gold medal in the coxless pair partnered with Günther Zumkeller. For their 1961 European Championship title, Zumkeller and Bender received the Silbernes Lorbeerblatt (Silver Laurel Leaf), the highest sports award in Germany. The pair then won a gold medal at the 1962 World Rowing Championships in Lucerne in the same boat class.
