= Nottingham & Union Rowing Club =

Rowing club

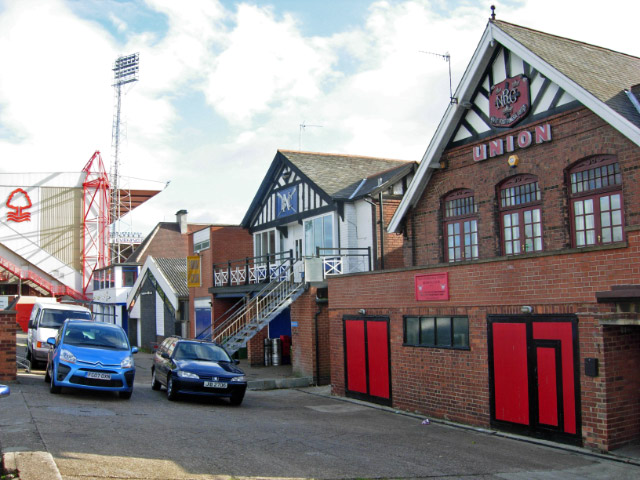

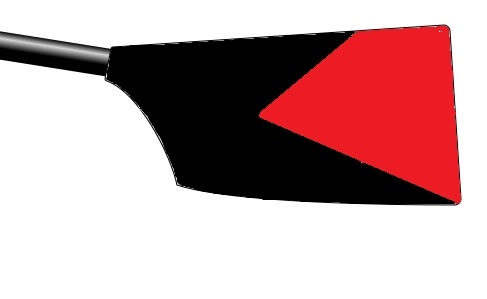
- Location: Trentside, West Bridgford, Nottingham, Nottinghamshire
- Coordinates: 52.939248°N 1.134432°W
- Affiliations: British Rowing (boat code NUN)
- Website: nurc.co.uk

Nottingham & Union Rowing Club is a rowing club on the River Trent, based at Trentside, West Bridgford, Nottingham, Nottinghamshire.

== History ==
The club was founded in 1946 as an amalgamation of two clubs called the Nottingham Union Rowing Club and the original Nottingham Rowing Club (not the modern club formed in 2006). The reason for the merger of the two clubs was because the boathouse belonging to the Nottingham Union club was destroyed by bombs in World War II leaving them no base to row from.

The club were the leading rowing club in Nottingham during the 1960s but by 1983 was struggling to recruit members. However, the club experienced a resurgence in the 1990s including recording significant success at the British Rowing Championships.

The club won the prestigious Wyfold Challenge Cup at the Henley Regatta in 1963 and 2010.

== Notable members ==
- Arnold Cooke
- Richard Nicholson (1966 World Rowing Championships)
- R C Waite (1966 World Rowing Championships)
- Peter Webb

== Honours ==
=== Henley Royal Regatta ===
Year	Races won
1963	Wyfold Challenge Cup
2010	Wyfold Challenge Cup

=== British champions ===
Year	Winning crew/s
1977	Men L2x
1981	Men L1x
1993	Men L8+
1994	Women 4x
1996	Women L2x
1997	Men U23 1x
2003	Men 4+, Men L4-
2005	Open L2-
