= Anatoli Fedorov =

Soviet rower and coach (1936–2012)

Personal information
- Born: 15 January 1936
- Died: 20 September 2012 (aged 76) Petrozavodsk, Russia

Sport
- Sport: Rowing
Medal record
Men's rowing
Representing Soviet Union
World Championships
Bronze medal – third place	1962 Lucerne	Coxed four
European Rowing Championships
Silver medal – second place	1961 Prague	Coxed four
Bronze medal – third place	1965 Duisburg	Coxless pair
Gold medal – first place	1969 Klagenfurt	Coxless four
Bronze medal – third place	1971 Copenhagen	Coxed four

Anatoli Stepanovich Fedorov (Russian: Анатолий Степанович Фёдоров) (15 January 1936 – 20 September 2012) was a Soviet and Russian rower and rowing coach.

Fedorov competed at the 1961 European Rowing Championships with the coxed four and won silver. He won a bronze medal at the 1962 World Rowing Championships in Lucerne with the coxed four. He won a bronze medal at the 1971 European Rowing Championships with the coxed four.

He died in 2012 in Petrozavodsk, Russia.
