= Vladimír Andrs =

Czech rower (1937–2018)

Personal information
- Born: 12 May 1937
- Died: 17 June 2018 (aged 81)
- Height: 176 cm (5 ft 9 in)
- Weight: 75 kg (165 lb)

Sport
- Sport: Rowing
Medal record
Men's rowing
Representing Czechoslovakia
Olympic Games
Bronze medal – third place	1964 Tokyo	Double sculls
European Championships
Gold medal – first place	1963 Copenhagen	Double sculls
Silver medal – second place	1961 Prague	Single sculls

Vladimír Andrs (12 May 1937 – 17 June 2018) was a Czech rower.

Andrs was born in Prague in 1937. He competed at the 1961 European Rowing Championships in single sculls and won silver. In 1964 he and his partner Pavel Hofmann competed for Czechoslovakia in the double sculls event at the 1964 Summer Olympics and won a bronze medal.
