= Peter Paustian =

German rower

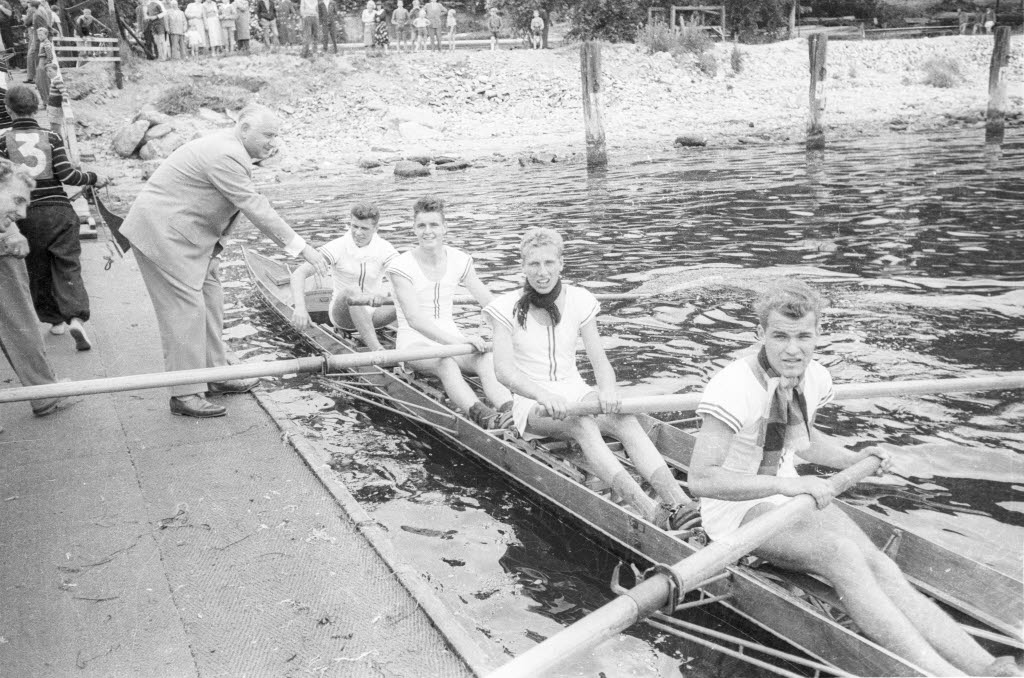
- Peter Paustian (second row) in 1957

Sport
- Sport: Rowing
Medal record
Men's rowing
Representing West Germany
World Rowing Championships
Gold medal – first place	1962 Lucerne	Four

Peter Paustian is a German rower. He won a gold medal at the 1962 World Rowing Championships in Lucerne with the men's coxless four.
