= Nina Korobkova =

Soviet rower (born 1926)

Personal information
- Full name: Nina Andreyevna Korobkova
- Born: 14 December 1926 Moscow, Russia

Sport
- Sport: Rowing
Medal record
Representing the Soviet Union
European Rowing Championships
| Gold medal – first place | 1955 Bucharest | Eight |
| Gold medal – first place | 1956 Bled | Eight |
| Gold medal – first place | 1957 Duisburg | Eight |
| Gold medal – first place | 1958 Poznań | Eight |
| Gold medal – first place | 1959 Mâcon | Eight |
| Gold medal – first place | 1960 London | Eight |
| Gold medal – first place | 1961 Prague | Eight |
| Gold medal – first place | 1962 East Berlin | Eight |

Nina Andreyevna Korobkova (Russian: Нина Андреевна Коробкова, born 14 December 1926) was a Soviet rower who won eight European titles in the eights event between 1955 and 1962. For these achievements she was awarded the Order of the Badge of Honour.
