= Oleg Tyurin =

Russian rower

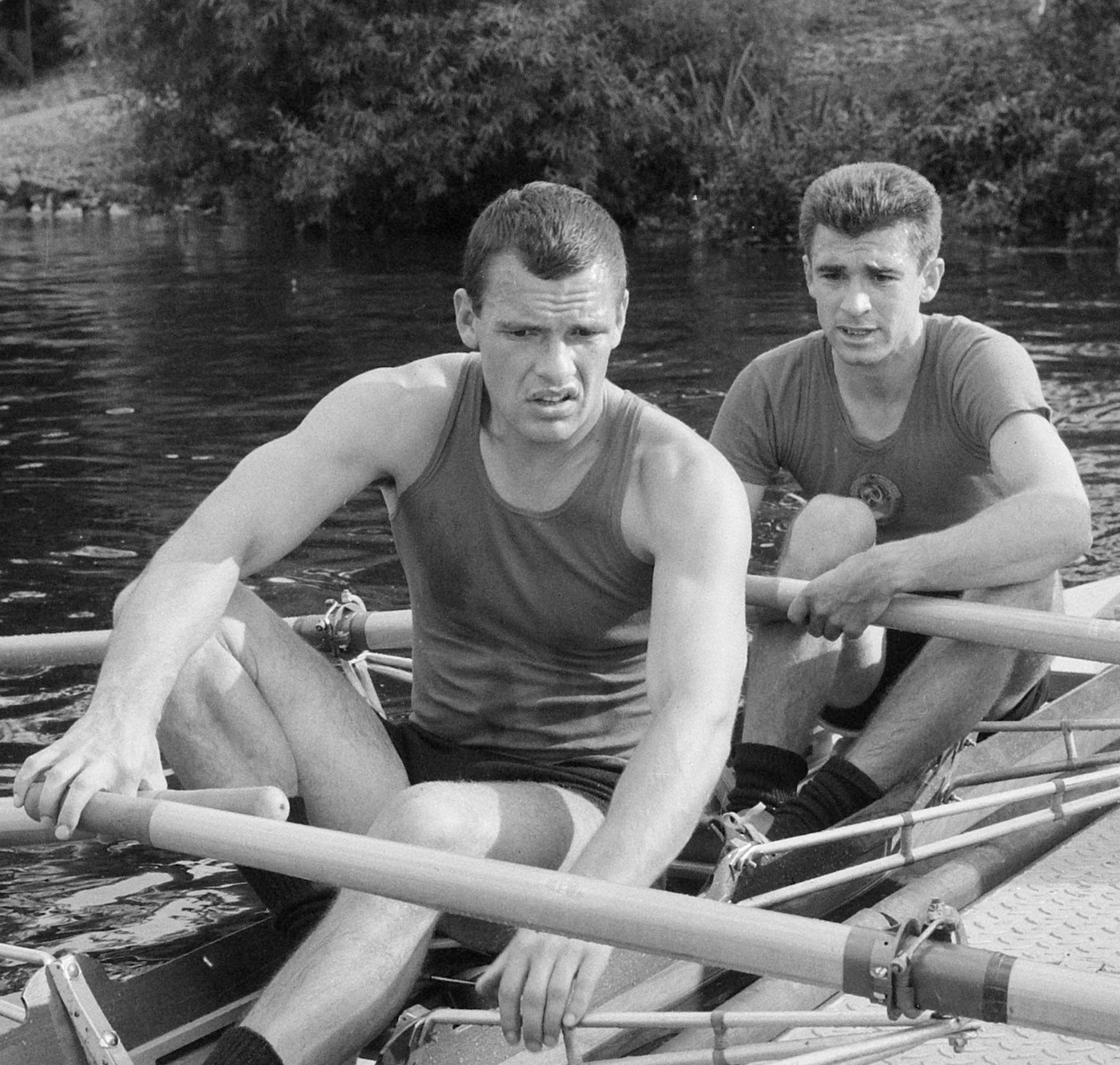
- Tyurin (left) and Dubrovsky in 1965

Personal information
- Born: 29 June 1937 Sinyavino, Leningrad, Russian SFSR, Soviet Union
- Died: 3 March 2010 (aged 72) St. Petersburg, Russia
- Height: 1.82 m (6 ft 0 in)
- Weight: 77 kg (170 lb)

Sport
- Sport: Rowing
- Club: Trud St. Petersburg, CSKA Moscow
Medal record
Representing the Soviet Union
Olympic Games
Gold medal – first place	1964 Tokyo	Double sculls
World Rowing Championships
Silver medal – second place	1962 Lucerne	Double sculls
European Rowing Championships
Bronze medal – third place	1963 Copenhagen	Double sculls
Gold medal – first place	1964 Amsterdam	Double sculls
Silver medal – second place	1965 Duisburg	Double sculls

Oleg Grigorevich Tyurin (Russian: Олег Григорьевич Тюрин, 29 June 1937 – 3 March 2010) was a Russian rower who had his best achievements in the double sculls, partnering with Boris Dubrovskiy. In this event, they won an Olympic gold in 1964 and four medals at European and world championships in 1962–1965.

Tyurin was born and raised in Saint Petersburg, but was invited to train in Moscow and join Dubrovsky in double sculls. After retiring from competitions he returned to St. Petersburg where he worked as a rowing coach.
