= Jim Storm (rower) =

American rower (born 1941)

Personal information
- Born: February 2, 1941 (age 85) San Diego, California
Medal record
Men's rowing
Representing United States
Olympic Games
Silver medal – second place	1964 Tokyo	Double sculls
World Rowing Championships
Silver medal – second place	1966 Bled	Double sculls

James Eugene Storm (born February 2, 1941) is an American rower who competed in the 1964 Summer Olympics.

He was born in San Diego, California.

In 1964 he won the silver medal with his partner Seymour Cromwell in the double sculls event.
