= Pavel Hofmann =

Czech rower (born 1938)

Personal information
- Born: 29 January 1938 (age 88) Prague, Czechoslovakia

Sport
- Sport: Rowing
Medal record
Men's rowing
Representing Czechoslovakia
Olympic Games
Bronze medal – third place	1964 Tokyo	Double sculls
European Championships
Silver medal – second place	1959 Mâcon	Eight
Gold medal – first place	1963 Copenhagen	Double sculls

Pavel Hofmann (born 29 January 1938) is a Czech rower who competed for Czechoslovakia in the 1960 Summer Olympics and in the 1964 Summer Olympics.

He was born in Prague.

In 1960 he was a crew member of the Czechoslovak boat which was eliminated in the semi-finals of the coxed four event.

Four years later he and his partner Vladimír Andrs won the bronze medal in the double sculls competition.
