= Bernard Monnereau =

French rower (1935–2019)

Personal information
- Born: 18 September 1935 Tôtes
- Died: 24 August 2019 (aged 83)

Sport
- Sport: Rowing
Medal record
Men's rowing
Representing France
World Rowing Championships
Gold medal – first place	1962 Lucerne	Double sculls
European Championships
Silver medal – second place	1958 Poznań	Double sculls
Mediterranean Games
Gold medal – first place	1963 Naples	Single sculls
Gold medal – first place	1963 Naples	Double sculls

Bernard Monnereau (18 September 1935 – 24 August 2019) was a French rower.

Monnereau was born in Tôtes in 1935. He competed at the 1960 Summer Olympics in Rome in double sculls partnered with René Duhamel, where they came fourth. They won a gold medal at the inaugural 1962 World Rowing Championships in Lucerne in the double sculls. At the 1964 Summer Olympics in Tokyo, Monnereau and Duhamel came sixth in the double sculls.
