= Zinaida Korotova =

Personal information
- Full name: Zinaida Fyodorovna Korotova
- Born: 5 April 1936 Moscow, Russia
- Died: 7 September 2013 (aged 77) Moscow, Russia

Sport
- Sport: Rowing
- Club: Kryl'ya Sovetov, Trud
Medal record
Representing the Soviet Union
European Rowing Championships
Gold medal – first place	1955 Bucharest	Eight
Gold medal – first place	1956 Bled	Eight
Gold medal – first place	1957 Duisburg	Eight
Gold medal – first place	1958 Poznań	Eight
Gold medal – first place	1959 Mâcon	Eight
Gold medal – first place	1960 London	Eight
Gold medal – first place	1961 Prague	Eight
Gold medal – first place	1962 East Berlin	Eight

Zinaida Fyodorovna Korotova (Russian: Зинаида Федоровна Коротова, 5 April 1936 – 7 September 2013) was a Russian rower who won eight European titles in the eights event between 1955 and 1962. For this achievement she was awarded the Order of the Badge of Honour.
