= Gerd Wolter =

German rower (born 1939)

Personal information
- Born: 22 May 1939 (age 87) Hirschberg, Lower Silesia, German Empire

Sport
- Sport: Rowing
Medal record
Men's rowing
Representing West Germany
World Rowing Championships
Gold medal – first place	1962 Lucerne	Coxless four
European Rowing Championships
Gold medal – first place	1963 Copenhagen	Coxed four

Gerd Wolter (born 22 May 1939) is a German rower. He won a gold medal at the 1962 World Rowing Championships in Lucerne with the men's coxless four.
