= Helga Richter =

German rower

- Helga Richter in 1960

Sport
- Sport: Rowing
- Club: Chemie Pirna
Medal record
Women's rowing
Representing East Germany
European Rowing Championships
| Silver medal – second place | 1956 Bled | Eight |
| Silver medal – second place | 1959 Mâcon | Quad scull |
| Gold medal – first place | 1960 London | Quad scull |
| Silver medal – second place | 1961 Prague | Double scull |
| Bronze medal – third place | 1961 Prague | Quad scull |
| Silver medal – second place | 1962 East Berlin | Quad scull |
| Gold medal – first place | 1964 Amsterdam | Quad scull |

Helga Richter is a retired German rower who won seven medals at European championships between 1956 and 1964, five of them with Hannelore Göttlich. After 1959–1960 she competed as Helga Menzel-Richter or Helga Menzel and after 1960–1961 as Helga Kolbe-Richter or Helga Kolbe. In December 1964, she was awarded the Medal of Merit of the GDR.
