= Arnold Cooke (rower) =

British rower

Personal information
- Born: Arnold Vivian Cooke; 13 April 1941 (age 85) Ruthin, Denbighshire

Sport
- Sport: Rowing
- Club: Leander Club; Nottingham & Union Rowing Club
Medal record
Representing the United Kingdom
European Rowing Championships
Silver medal – second place	1964 Amsterdam	Double sculls

Arnold Vivian Cooke (born 13 April 1941) is a retired Welsh born, British rower who competed in the 1964 Olympics.

== Rowing career ==
Cooke rowed in the boat race in 1963 for CUBC

Cooke was selected to compete for Great Britain in the 1964 Olympics in Tokyo. He rowed with Peter Webb in the men's double sculls, finishing in seventh place. He won a silver medal in the 1964 European Rowing Championships. Two years later in 1966 represented Britain again at the 1966 World Rowing Championships but this time partnering Nick Cooper in the double sculls, they finished in 9th place overall after a third-place finish in the B final.

Cooke is the president of the Minerva Bath Rowing Club.
