= Bernd-Jürgen Marschner =

German rower

Sport
- Sport: Rowing
Medal record
Men's rowing
Representing West Germany
World Rowing Championships
Gold medal – first place	1962 Lucerne	Four
European Rowing Championships
Silver medal – second place	1961 Prague	Eight

Bernd-Jürgen Marschner is a German rower.

Marschner won silver with the West German eight at the 1961 European Rowing Championships in Prague. He won a gold medal at the 1962 World Rowing Championships in Lucerne with the men's coxed four.
