= Hannelore Göttlich =

German rower

- Hannelore Göttlich in 1960

Sport
- Sport: Rowing
- Club: Chemie Pirna
Medal record
Women's rowing
Representing East Germany
European Rowing Championships
Silver medal – second place	1959 Mâcon	Quad sculls
Gold medal – first place	1960 London	Quad sculls
Silver medal – second place	1961 Prague	Double sculls
Silver medal – second place	1962 East Berlin	Quad sculls
Silver medal – second place	1963 Moscow	Double sculls
Gold medal – first place	1964 Amsterdam	Quad sculls

Hannelore Göttlich is a retired German rower who won six medals at the European championships between 1959 and 1964, five of them with Helga Richter. In December 1964, she was awarded the Medal of Merit of the GDR.
