= Barbara Müller (rower) =

East German rower (born 1937)

Personal information
- Born: Barbara Reichel; 29 September 1937 (age 88)

Sport
- Sport: Rowing
- Club: SCW DHfK Leipzig
Medal record
Women's rowing
Representing East Germany
Bronze medal – third place	1960 London	Coxed four
Silver medal – second place	1961 Prague	Eight
Silver medal – second place	1962 East Berlin	Eight
Silver medal – second place	1963 Moscow	Eight
Gold medal – first place	1964 Amsterdam	Eight

Barbara Müller (née Reichel; born 29 September 1937), is a rower who represented East Germany in the 1960s. She was later a rowing coach for SG Dynamo Potsdam.

== Rowing career ==
Reichel was born in 1937. She started for SCW DHfK Leipzig and at the 1957 East German national championships she came third with the women's eight. A year later, she again came third at the nationals. At the 1959 nationals, she came second. In 1959, she also competed in the coxed quad scull and that team came second. At the 1960 East German national championships she came first with the coxed four. That team was sent to the 1960 European Rowing Championships in London where they won a bronze medal, beaten by the teams from the Soviet Union and from Romania. At the 1961 East German national championships she became national champion with both the coxed four and the women's eight. The women's eight, made up solely of rowers from SCW DHfK Leipzig, was sent to the 1961 European Rowing Championships in Prague, Czechoslovakia, where they won silver. In December 1961, seven of the eight rowers were given a Master of Sport award (Gisela Schirmer and their coxswain missed out). The 1962 East German national championships were held on the Grünau Regatta Course and Reichel defended both her titles. The 1962 European Rowing Championships were held at the same venue a month later and Reichel was again part of the women's eight that came second.

From the 1963 season, Müller competed under her married name. At the national championships, the women's eight was made from a composite crew from TSC Berlin and SCW DHfK Leipzig. Müller remained part of this team and secured the title without there being any opposition. She was part of the first team of Leipzig rowers that formed a coxed four and they came fourth, with the second Leipzig team beating them for second place. At the 1963 European Rowing Championships in Moscow, the composite eight was narrowly beaten by the team from the Soviet Union; in fact the Soviet rowers took out all six gold medals available to female rowers. At the 1964 national championships, the women's eight returned to be made up of club teams and Müller's team took out the title. With the coxed four, Müller won her second national title that year. For the 1964 European Rowing Championships in Amsterdam, a composite team made up of Leipzig and TSC Berlin rowers was formed and this year, they took out the European title and displacing the favourite team from the Soviet Union to second. Müller retired from competitive rowing at the end of the season.

== Coaching career ==
Müller worked as a rowing coach in Brandenburg an der Havel after her international career. She coached the coxed quad scull team that won gold at the 1973 European Rowing Championships in Moscow. In January 1974, she was awarded Honoured Master of Sport for her coaching success. In changed composition with two rowers and the cox replaced, her coxed quad scull won gold at the (for women) inaugural 1974 World Rowing Championships. In November 1974, she was awarded a Patriotic Order of Merit in bronze (third class). As a coach for SG Dynamo Potsdam, she was awarded Banner of Labor in second class in September 1976.

Müller trained Martina Schröter and Roswietha Zobelt.
