= Nina Shamanova =

Soviet rower

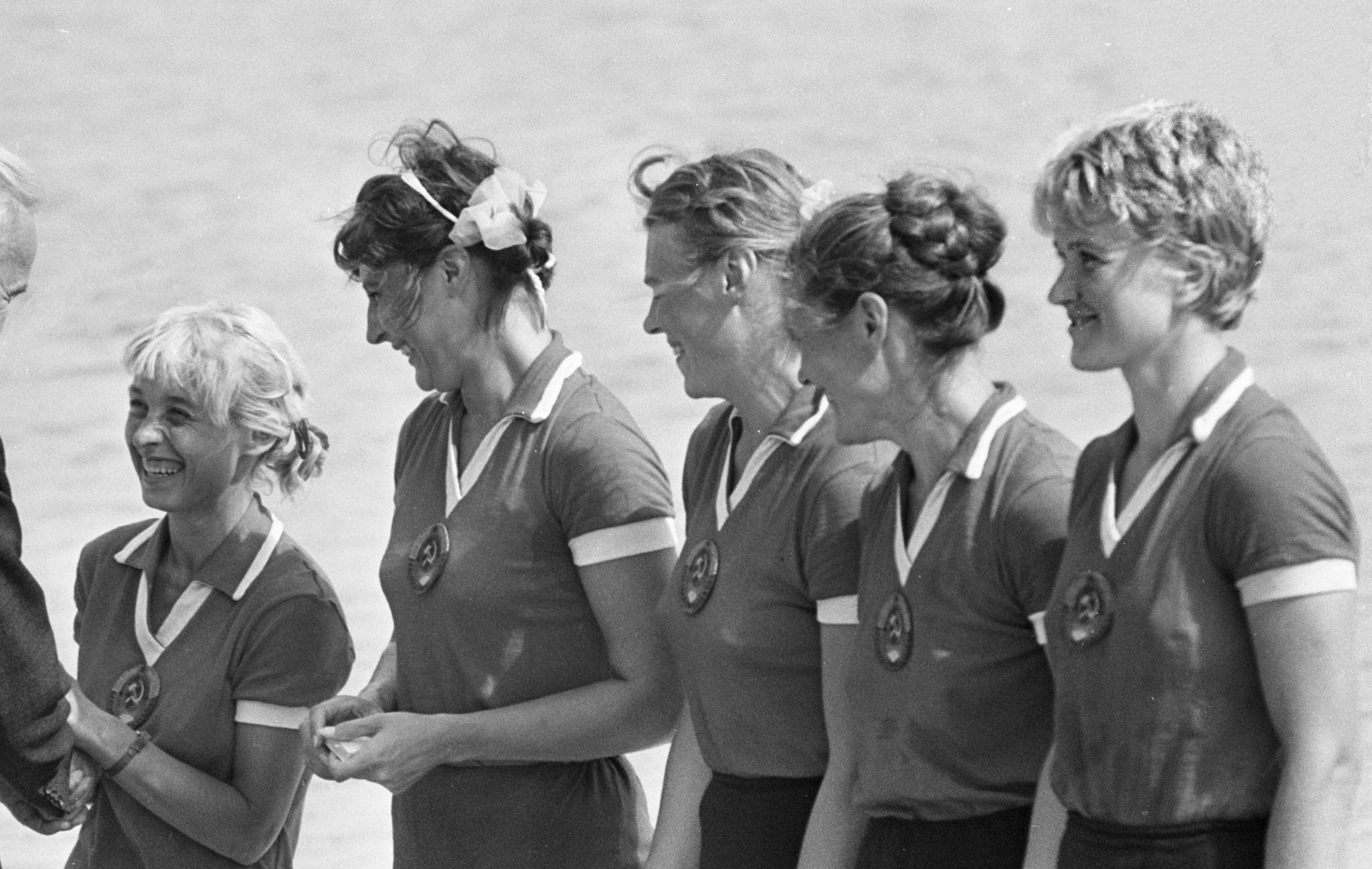
- Soviet coxed four at the 1964 European Championships, Shamanova is second from left

Personal information
- Born: 29 July 1937 Moscow, Soviet Union
- Died: 29 October 2021 (aged 84) Moscow, Russia

Sport
- Sport: rowing
Medal record
Representing the Soviet Union
European Rowing Championships
Gold medal – first place	1959 Mâcon	Coxed four
Gold medal – first place	1960 London	Coxed four
Gold medal – first place	1961 Prague	Coxed four
Silver medal – second place	1962 East Berlin	Coxed four
Gold medal – first place	1963 Moscow	Coxed four
Gold medal – first place	1964 Amsterdam	Coxed four

Nina Nikiforovna Shamanova (Russian: Нина Никифоровна Шаманова; 29 July 1937 – 29 October 2021) was a Soviet rower who won five European titles in the coxed four between 1959 and 1964. In the 2000s she worked as an organizer and referee of rowing competitions.
