= Ella Sergeyeva =

Soviet rower

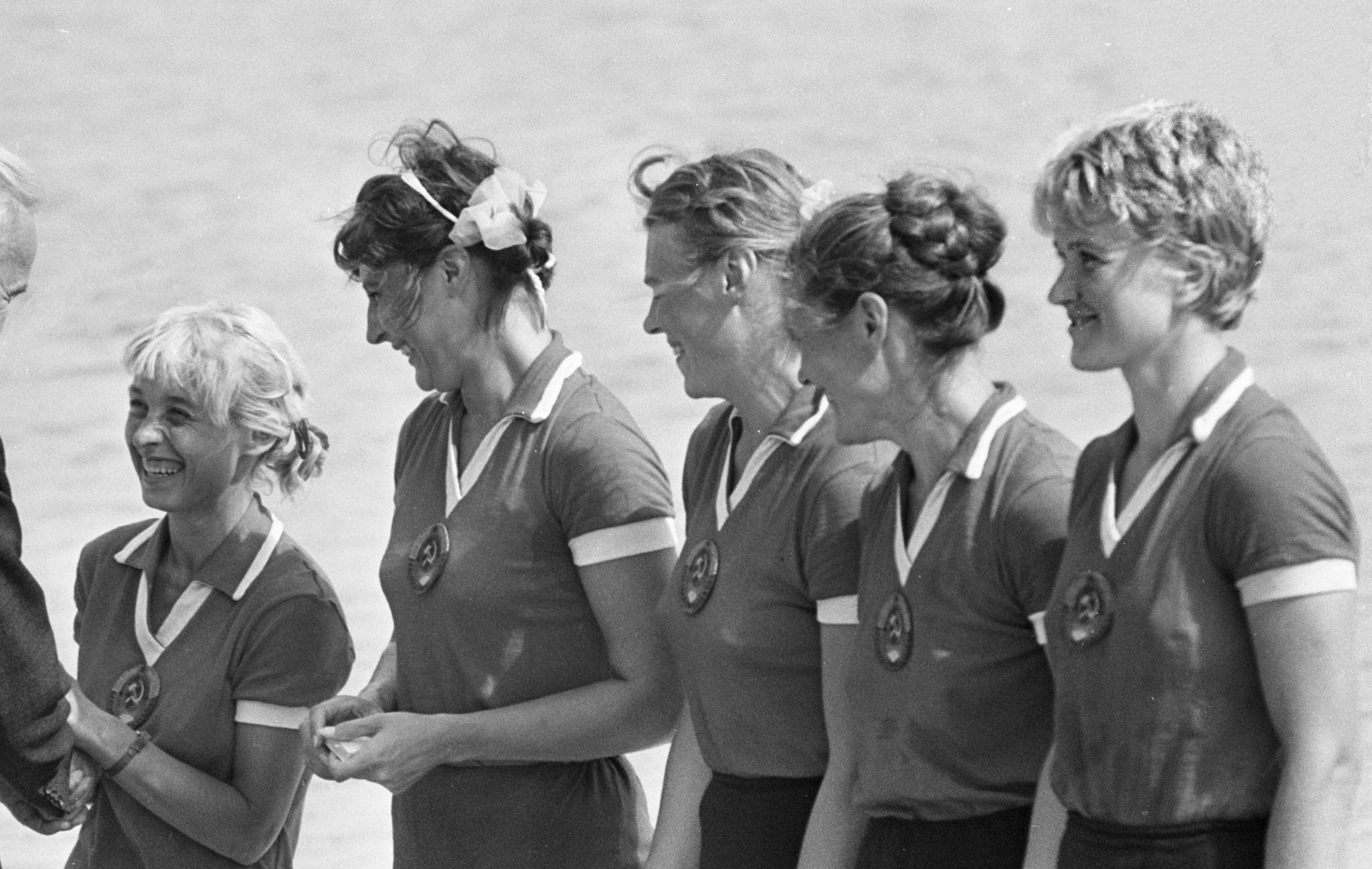
- Soviet coxed four at the 1964 European Championships, Sergeyeva is in the middle

Personal information
- Born: 9 May 1935 Moscow, Soviet Union
- Died: 11 April 2024 (aged 88) Moscow, Russia

Sport
- Sport: Rowing
Medal record
Representing the Soviet Union
European Rowing Championships
Gold medal – first place	1958 Poznań	Coxed four
Gold medal – first place	1959 Mâcon	Coxed four
Gold medal – first place	1960 London	Coxed four
Gold medal – first place	1961 Prague	Coxed four
Silver medal – second place	1962 East Berlin	Coxed four
Gold medal – first place	1963 Moscow	Coxed four
Gold medal – first place	1964 Amsterdam	Coxed four

Ella Sergeyeva (Russian: Элла Сергеева, later Byvsheva; 9 May 1935 – 11 April 2024) was a Soviet rower who won six European titles in the coxed four between 1958 and 1964.

Sergeyeva graduated from the Faculty of Chemistry of Moscow State University. After her retirement from the sport, she worked for many years at the State Research Institute of Organic Chemistry and Technology.

Sergeeva died on 11 April 2024 in Moscow. She is buried at the Vagankovo Cemetery.
