= Brigitte Amm =

East German rower

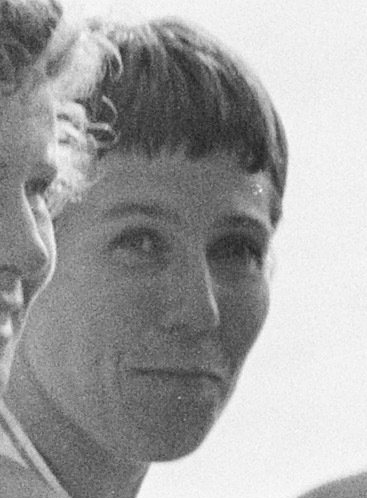
- Amm at the 1966 European Championships

Sport
- Sport: Rowing
- Club: SCW DHfK Leipzig
Medal record
Women's rowing
Representing East Germany
European Rowing Championships
Silver medal – second place	1961 Prague	Eight
Silver medal – second place	1962 East Berlin	Eight
Silver medal – second place	1963 Moscow	Eight
Silver medal – second place	1964 Amsterdam	Coxed four
Gold medal – first place	1966 Amsterdam	Eight

Brigitte Amm is a retired East German rower who won one gold and four silver medals at European championships between 1961 and 1966.

At the 1961 East German national championships she became national champion with the women's eight. The women's eight, made up solely of rowers from SCW DHfK Leipzig, was sent to the 1961 European Rowing Championships in Prague, Czechoslovakia, where they won silver. In December 1961, seven of the eight rowers were given a Master of Sport award (Gisela Schirmer and their coxswain missed out).
