= Nick Cooper (rower) =

British rower

Personal information
- Birth name: Nicholas Cooper
- Born: First quarter 1942; Norfolk

Sport
- Sport: Rowing
- Club: Leander Club; London RC; Norwich RC; Yare RC

Nicholas P Cooper (born 1942) is a retired rower who competed for Great Britain.

== Rowing career ==
Cooper represented Great Britain at five World Championships during the 1960s and, in 1967, won the British Sculling championships - The Wingfield Sculls. He won three events at Henley Royal Regatta.

In 1966, Cooper along with Leander rowing partner Arnold Cooke reached the final of the Double Sculls Challenge Cup at the Henley Royal Regatta. Later that year he won the Open Prize at the Reading Scullers Head.
