= 1961 European Rowing Championships =

- Venue: Vltava
- Location: Prague, Czechoslovakia
- Dates: 18–20 August 1961 (women); 24–27 August 1961 (men)
- Nations: 9 (women) and 20 (men)

The 1961 European Rowing Championships were rowing championships held on the Vltava in the Czechoslovak capital Prague. The event for women was held from 18 to 20 August, and 9 countries competed with 32 boats. The event for men was held from 24 to 27 August, and 20 countries entered boats. Men competed in all seven Olympic boat classes (M1x, M2x, M2-, M2+, M4-, M4+, M8+), and just three countries entered boats in all classes: the hosts Czechoslovakia, the Soviet Union, and a combined German team. Women entered in five boat classes (W1x, W2x, W4x+, W4+, W8+). The regatta was held in five lanes, with rowers proceeding in the direction of the river's flow.

== German representation ==
Germany had to enter a combined team. The women from both countries had a qualification event on the Langer See in Grünau, which had previously been used as the rowing venue for the 1936 Summer Olympics. The West Germans entered the three sculling boat classes only (W1x, W2x, W4x+), and in all events, the East Germans won the competition. East German teams for the coxed four and the eight complemented a complete team.

East Germany nominated its men at the end of July, and following the West German national championships, the West Germans nominated their men's team in early August. There were difficult negotiations between West and East German representatives as to the location for the German qualifications. In the end, the regatta facility on the Templiner See in Potsdam favoured by East Germany was agreed to. The German qualifications were decided on 12 August, with West Germany winning all seven races.

== Medal summary ==
Medallists at the 1961 European Rowing Championships were:

=== Women's events ===
Of the nine countries that were represented, only three were from western Europe: Great Britain (coxed four, double scull, single scull), Belgium and the Netherlands (both single scull). Of those, only Britain managed to get two of their boats into the finals; Penny Chuter came fourth in the single scull, and they came fifth in the coxed four. The most successful nation in the women's events was the Soviet Union, with four out of a possible five gold medals.

Event	Gold		Silver		Bronze	
Event	Country & rowers	Time	Country & rowers	Time	Country & rowers	Time
W1x	Hungary; Kornélia Pap	3:48.9	Czechoslovakia; Alena Postlová	3:52.1	Soviet Union; Zoja Rakickaja	3:53.5
W2x	Soviet Union; Valentina Kalegina; Galina Vecherkovskaya	3:34.9	East Germany; Hannelore Göttlich; Helga Kolbe	3:37.0	Romania; Ana Tamas; Florica Ghiuzelea	3:42.2
W4x+	Soviet Union; Valentina Vassilieva; Ljudmila Suslova; Aino Pajusalu; Nina Polyakova; Tamara Ivanova (cox)	3:24.9	Czechoslovakia; Marta Sipova; Jarmila Plocarova; Svetla Bartakova; Hana Musilova; Ivana Potocnikova (cox)	3:28.4	East Germany; Helga Schlittermann-Fischer; Ursula Pankraths; Helga Ammon; Helga Kolbe; Karla Frister (cox)	3:28.8
W4+	Soviet Union; Valentina Terekhova; Nadeschda Skunkova; Ella Sergeyeva; Nina Shamanova; Valentina Timofeyeva (cox)	3:28.1	Romania; Emilia Rigard; Ana Tamas; Florica Ghiuzelea; Iuliana Bulugioiu; Stefania Borisov (cox)	3:32.1	East Germany; Ingrid Graf; Waltraud Dinter; Hilde Amelang; Marianne Mewes; Elfriede Boetius (cox)	3:36.9
W8+	Soviet Union; Sinaida Kirillina; Vera Rebrova; Valentina Sirsikova; Nonna Petsernikova; Nina Korobkova; Lidiya Zontova; Zinaida Korotova; Nadeschda Gontsarova; Viktoriya Dobrodeeva (cox)	3:13.6	East Germany; Waltraud Böhlmann; Gisela Schirmer; Erika Kretschmer; Ute Gabler; Brigitte Amm; Gerlinde Löwenstein; Barbara Reichel; Christa Schollain-Temeier; Sigrid Laube (cox)	3:17.2	Romania; Emilia Oros; Maria Draghici; Magda Vladut; Mariana Horvath; Viorica Moldovan; Olimpia Bogdan; Margareta Stoian; Mariana Limpede; Stefania Borisov (cox)	3:18.7

=== Men's events ===
The most successful nation was the Soviet Union, which won three gold medals.

Event	Gold		Silver		Bronze	
Event	Country & rowers	Time	Country & rowers	Time	Country & rowers	Time
M1x	Soviet Union; Vyacheslav Ivanov		Czechoslovakia; Vladimír Andrs		United States; Seymour Cromwell	
M2x	Soviet Union; Aleksandr Berkutov; Yuriy Tyukalov	6:33.6	United Kingdom; Nicholas Birkmyre; George Justicz		Czechoslovakia; Václav Kozák; Pavel Schmidt	
M2-	West Germany; Günther Zumkeller; Dieter Bender	7:01.9	Finland; Veli Lehtelä; Toimi Pitkänen		Netherlands; Ernst Veenemans; Steven Blaisse	
M2+	Soviet Union; Zigmas Jukna; Antanas Bagdonavičius; Gerdas Morhus (cox)	7:45.3	Romania; Ionel Petrov; Ilie Husarenco; Oprea Păunescu (cox)		Czechoslovakia; Václav Chalupa; Miroslav Strejček; Jan Dvorak (cox)	
M4-	Italy; Renato Bosatta; Tullio Baraglia; Giancarlo Crosta; Giuseppe Galante	6:28.3	Soviet Union; Valentin Markovkin; Igor Akhremchik; Anatoly Tarabrin; Yuri Basurov		West Germany; Klaus Wegner; Manfred Uellner; Klaus Riekemann; Günter Schroers	
M4+	West Germany; Karl-Heinz Hopp; Klaus Bittner; Kraft Schepke; Frank Schepke; Reinhold Brümmer (cox)	6:33.1	Soviet Union; Oleg Aleksandrov; Boris Fyodorov; Yury Suslin; Anatoli Fedorov; Igor Rudakov (cox)		Italy; Vito Casalucci; Michele Vertuccio; Salvatore Ibba; Francesco Staiti; Giuseppe Giorgianni (cox)	
M8+	Italy; Romano Sgheiz; Giovanni Zucchi; Raffaele Viviani; Giuseppe Palese; Fulvio Balatti; Gianpietro Gilardi; Vinico Brondi; Sereno Brunello; Ivo Stefanoni (cox)	5:52.2	West Germany; Wolfgang Tietenberg; Detlef Raatz; Joachim Schulz; Peter Riff; Bernd-Jürgen Marschner; Peter Neusel; Bernhard Britting; Manfred Ross; Jürgen Oelke (cox)	5:52.4	France; Christian Puibaraud; Jean-Louis Bellet; Joseph Moroni; Robert Dumontois; Gaston Mercier; Bernard Meynadier; Émile Clerc; Michel Viaud; Alain Bouffard (cox)	

== Medals tables ==
The first table shows the aggregate results for men and women with Germany counted as one country. The overall winner was the Soviet Union with seven gold medals, followed by Germany and then Italy with two gold medals each, but Germany also winning three silver medals whilst Italy did not win silver.

Rank	Nation	Gold	Silver	Bronze	Total
1	Soviet Union (URS)	7	2	1	10
2	Germany (GER)	2	3	3	8
3	Italy (ITA)	2	0	1	3
4	Hungary (HUN)	1	0	0	1
5	Czechoslovakia (TCH)	0	3	2	5
6	Romania (ROU)	0	2	2	4
7	Finland (FIN)	0	1	0	1
7	Great Britain (GBR)	0	1	0	1
9	France (FRA)	0	0	1	1
9	Netherlands (NED)	0	0	1	1
9	United States (USA)	0	0	1	1
Totals (11 entries)		12	12	12	36

The second table shows the aggregate results for men and women with East Germany and West Germany counted as separate countries; all male German winners were West Germans while all female German winners were from the east. The overall winner remains the Soviet Union with seven gold medals, followed by West Germany and then Italy with two gold medals each, but West Germany also winning one silver medal whilst Italy did not win silver. East Germany is ranked sixth with this method of counting medals.

Rank	Nation	Gold	Silver	Bronze	Total
1	Soviet Union (URS)	7	2	1	10
2	West Germany (FRG)	2	1	1	4
3	Italy (ITA)	2	0	1	3
4	Hungary (HUN)	1	0	0	1
5	Czechoslovakia (TCH)	0	3	2	5
6	East Germany (GDR)	0	2	2	4
6	Romania (ROU)	0	2	2	4
8	Finland (FIN)	0	1	0	1
8	Great Britain (GBR)	0	1	0	1
10	France (FRA)	0	0	1	1
10	Netherlands (NED)	0	0	1	1
10	United States (USA)	0	0	1	1
Totals (12 entries)		12	12	12	36
