= Hilde Schulz-Amelang =

East German rower

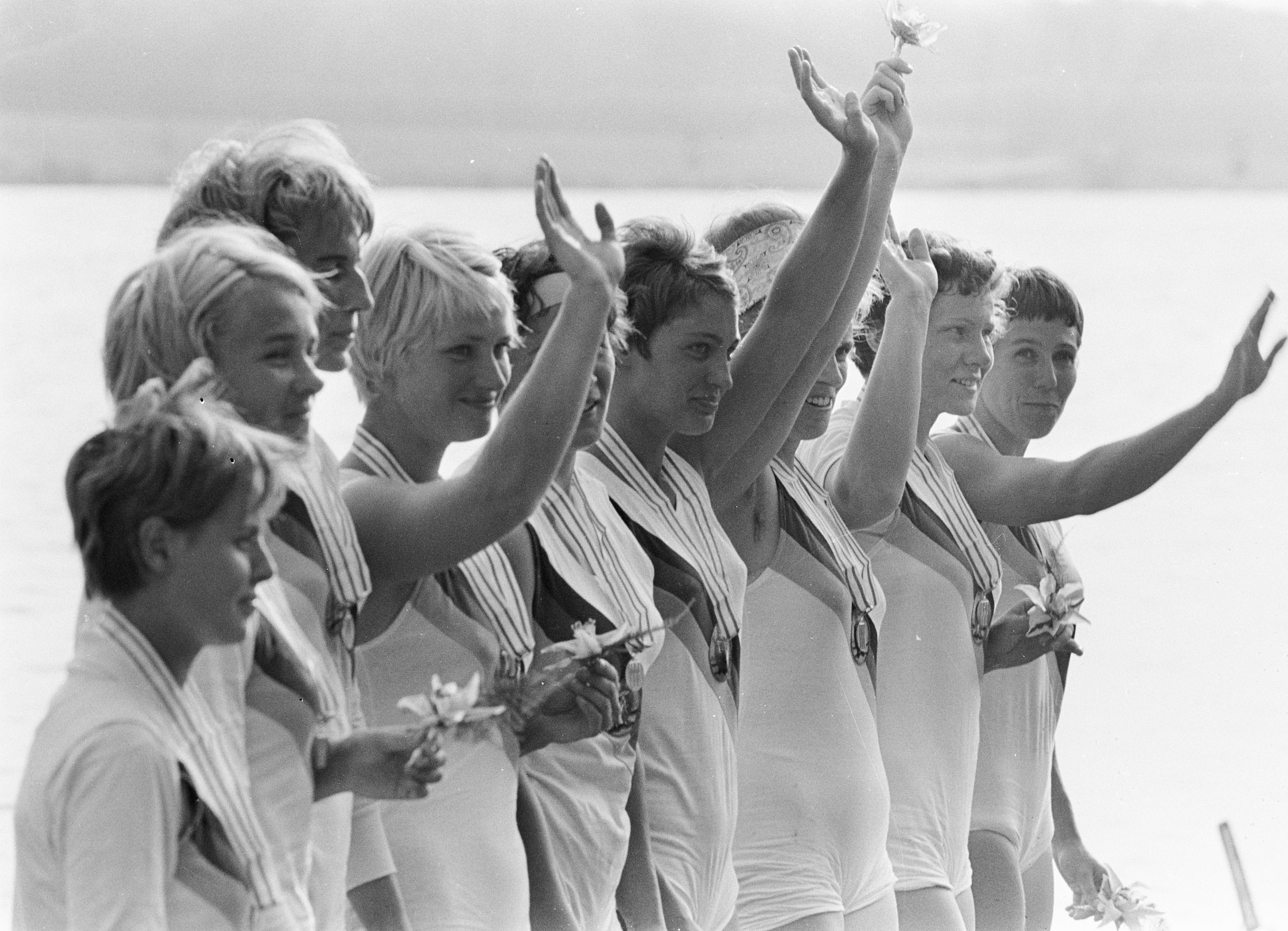
- Amelang (third from right) at the 1966 European Championships

Personal information
- Born: 22 December 1937 (age 88) Berlin, Germany

Sport
- Sport: Rowing
- Club: TSC Oberschöneweide, later: TSC Berlin
Medal record
Women's rowing
Representing East Germany
European Rowing Championships
Silver medal – second place	1959 Mâcon	Eight
Silver medal – second place	1960 London	Eight
Bronze medal – third place	1961 Prague	Coxed four
Bronze medal – third place	1962 East Berlin	Coxed four
Silver medal – second place	1963 Moscow	Eight
Gold medal – first place	1964 Amsterdam	Eight
Gold medal – first place	1966 Amsterdam	Eight

Hilde Schulz-Amelang (née Amelang; born 22 December 1938) is a retired East German rower who won seven European medals in rowing between 1959 and 1966, including two gold medals. After retiring from competitions she worked as a rowing referee, becoming in 1976 the world's third woman with the international referee license.
