= Manfred Ross =

German rower

Personal information
- Born: 20 January 1940 (age 86)

Sport
- Sport: Rowing
Medal record
Men's rowing
Representing West Germany
World Rowing Championships
Gold medal – first place	1962 Lucerne	Coxed four
European Rowing Championships
Silver medal – second place	1961 Prague	Eight

Manfred Ross (born 20 January 1940) is a German rower. He won a gold medal at the 1962 World Rowing Championships in Lucerne with the men's coxed four.
