= Marianne Mewes =

East German rower

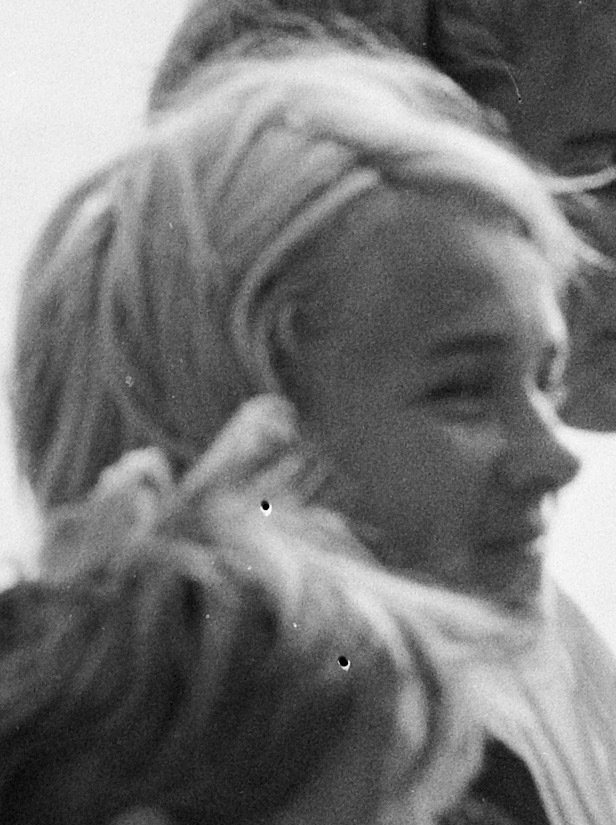
- Mewes at the 1966 European Championships

Sport
- Sport: Rowing
- Club: TSC Berlin
Medal record
Women's rowing
Representing East Germany
European Rowing Championships
Silver medal – second place	1960 London	Eight
Bronze medal – third place	1961 Prague	Coxed four
Bronze medal – third place	1962 East Berlin	Coxed four
Silver medal – second place	1963 Moscow	Eight
Gold medal – first place	1964 Amsterdam	Eight
Gold medal – first place	1966 Amsterdam	Eight

Marianne Mewes is a retired East German rower who won two gold, two silver and two bronze medals at the European championships between 1960 and 1966.
