= Helmut Lebert =

West German rower

Personal information
- Born: 18 February 1941 (age 84); Munich, Germany
- Height: 188 cm (6 ft 2 in)
- Weight: 83 kg (183 lb)

Sport
- Sport: Rowing

Helmut Lebert (born 18 February 1941) is a West German rower who represented the United Team of Germany. He competed at the 1964 Summer Olympics in Tokyo with the men's double sculls where they came fifth.
