= Roza Chumakova =

Russian rower

Personal information
- Born: 8 June 1924 Moscow, Russia
- Died: 10 October 2007 (aged 83)

Sport
- Sport: Rowing
Medal record
Representing the Soviet Union
European Rowing Championships
Gold medal – first place	1954 Amsterdam	Single sculls
Gold medal – first place	1955 Bucharest	Single sculls

Roza Stepanovna Chumakova (Russian: Роза Степановна Чумакова, 8 June 1924 – 10 October 2007) was Russian rower who won two European titles in the single sculls in 1954 and 1955.

== Biography ==
Chumakova graduated from secondary school shortly before the start of the German invasion of the Soviet Union in World War II. The same year she volunteered to work as a nurse at a military hospital and then as a radio operator at the Soviet Air Force. For her service at the World War II fronts between 1942 and 1944 Chumakova was later awarded the Order of the Patriotic War and Medal "For the Victory over Germany in the Great Patriotic War 1941–1945". She started training in rowing in 1944, shortly after demobilization. In parallel, she studied at the Moscow State University of Railway Engineering, then Moscow State Linguistic University, and then at the Moscow Institute of Physical Education (GTSOLIFK), graduating in 1949. In 1969 she defended her PhD on physical training of elite rowers and later worked as professor of physical education at the Moscow State Technical University of Civil Aviation. Between 1985 and 2000 she was president of the Moscow Federation of Masters Rowing.

Chumakova had a brother Slava and a daughter Tatyana. She was married more than once, last to Igor Borisovich Yefimov.
