= Josef Steffes-Mies =

German rower (1940–2021)

Personal information
- Born: 13 May 1940 Essen, Germany
- Died: 26 July 2021 (aged 81) Mainz, Germany
- Height: 195 cm (6 ft 5 in)
- Weight: 91 kg (201 lb)

Sport
- Sport: Rowing
Medal record
Men's rowing
Representing West Germany
World Rowing Championships
| Bronze medal – third place | 1962 Lucerne | Double sculls |

Josef Steffes-Mies (13 May 1940 – 26 July 2021) was a West German rower who represented the United Team of Germany. He competed at the 1964 Summer Olympics in Tokyo with the men's double sculls where they came fifth.
