= Seymour Cromwell =

American rower (1934–1977)

Sy Cromwell
Personal information
- Born: Seymour Legrand Cromwell II; February 17, 1934 New York City, New York, U.S.
- Died: May 2, 1977 (aged 43) Cambridge, Massachusetts, U.S.
- Height: 6 ft 4 in (1.93 m)
- Weight: 196 lb (89 kg)

Sport
- Sport: Rowing
- Club: New Rochelle Boat Club
Medal record
Men's rowing
Representing the United States
Olympic Games
Silver medal – second place	1964 Tokyo	Double sculls
World Championships
Silver medal – second place	1966 Bled	Double sculls
Bronze medal – third place	1962 Lucerne	Single sculls
Pan American Games
Gold medal – first place	1963 Sao Paulo	Single sculls
European Championships
Silver medal – second place	1963 Copenhagen	Double sculls
Bronze medal – third place	1961 Prague	Single sculls

Seymour Legrand "Sy" Cromwell II (February 17, 1934 – May 2, 1977) was an American rower. He won a silver medal in the double sculls event at the 1964 Summer Olympics and at the 1966 World Rowing Championships.

== Private life ==
Cromwell was born in New York City in 1934. His paternal grandfather, and namesake, was Seymour L. Cromwell, a former president of the New York Stock Exchange. Cromwell prepared at Groton School graduating in 1952. After graduating from Princeton University in 1956, he studied at MIT and Harvard University. He then briefly worked as a naval architect, but then changed to teaching.

== Rowing ==
During his rowing career, Cromwell won seven national titles in the single sculls and several more in double sculls. He won the Diamond Challenge Sculls at the Henley Royal Regatta in 1964, rowing for the Nonpareil Rowing Club of New York. He competed at the 1961 European Rowing Championships in single sculls and won bronze. Although he was selected only for the 1964 Olympics, he continued to be a top US rower up to 1970s, finishing third at the 1976 Olympic trials. In 1963, he won a gold medal at the Pan American Games in single sculls.

== Death and family ==
He died of pancreatic cancer on May 2, 1977, in Cambridge, Massachusetts. He was survived by his wife, Gail Pierson Cromwell, originally of Natchitoches, Louisiana and his daughter, Abigail W. S. Cromwell, of Cambridge, Massachusetts, who was born after he died.
