= Yasushi Murase =

Japanese rower (born 1941)

Personal information
- Nationality: Japanese
- Born: 25 October 1941 (age 83)
- Height: 170 cm (5 ft 7 in)
- Weight: 65 kg (143 lb)

Sport
- Sport: Rowing

Yasushi Murase (村瀬 康, Murase Yasushi, born 25 October 1941) is a Japanese rower. He competed in the men's double sculls event at the 1964 Summer Olympics.
