= René Duhamel =

French rower

Personal information
- Born: 1 February 1935 Rouen, Seine-Maritime, France
- Died: 12 March 2007 (aged 72)

Sport
- Sport: Rowing
- Club: Avignon SN, Rouen CNA, Caderousse SN
Medal record
Men's rowing
Representing France
World Championships
Gold medal – first place	1962 Lucerne	Double sculls
European Championships
Silver medal – second place	1958 Poznań	Double sculls

René Duhamel (1 February 1935 – 12 March 2007) was a French male rower. He has competed at the 1960 Summer Olympics and in the 1964 Summer Olympics.

Duhamel has also competed at the inaugural World Rowing Championships held in 1962. He along with Bernard Monnereau won the gold medal in the men's double scull (M2×) event representing France.
