= Karla Frister =

German coxswain rower

- Karla Frister in 1958

Sport
- Sport: Rowing
Medal record
Women's rowing
Representing East Germany
European Rowing Championships
Silver medal – second place	1958 Poznań	Quad sculls
Gold medal – first place	1960 London	Quad sculls
Bronze medal – third place	1961 Prague	Quad sculls
Silver medal – second place	1962 East Berlin	Eights

Karla Frister is a retired German coxswain who won four medals at the European championships of 1958–1962.
