= Gary Pearce (rower) =

Australian former rower (born 1944)

Olympic medal record

Men's rowing
Silver medal – second place	1968 Mexico City	Men's eight

Gary Malcolm Pearce (born 27 February 1944) is an Australian former rower. He was a national champion and a three-time Olympian who competed at the 1964 Summer Olympics, the 1968 Summer Olympics and the 1972 Summer Olympics.

== Early life and sporting pedigree ==
He was born in Leichhardt, New South Wales into a famous Australian rowing family.

Gary's father Cecil Pearce had sculled for Australia at the 1936 Berlin Olympics, and his great-grandfather Henry John "Harry" Pearce, Sr. was an Australian champion in sculling. Cecil's uncle Henry J "Harry, Jr" Pearce Jr., was also an Australian sculling champion and challenged for the world championship twice (in 1911 and 1913) and Harry Jr's son (Gary's second cousin) was Bobby Pearce, the dual Olympic gold medal winner and one of Australia's all-time greatest scullers. Gary's own grandfather Sandy Pearce was an Australian national rugby league representative as was his son Sid Pearce (Gary's uncle).

== Career ==
Pearce's senior rowing was with the Balmain Rowing Club in Sydney. In 1964 he partnered up with Barclay Wade of the Mosman Rowing Club in a composite double and won the national title in the men's double scull at the second ever Australian Rowing Championships. This was a selection regatta for the Tokyo Olympics and Wade and Pearce were selected as the Olympic representative double. In Tokyo they finished 13th in the double sculls event.

In 1968, by now rowing from the Sydney Rowing Club he was selected in the two seat of the Australian eight which rowed to a silver medal in the eights competition at the Mexico Olympics. In 1972 he was again in the Australian eight and that crew finished eighth in its event at the Munich Olympics.
