= Max Alwin =

Dutch rower (1939–1995)

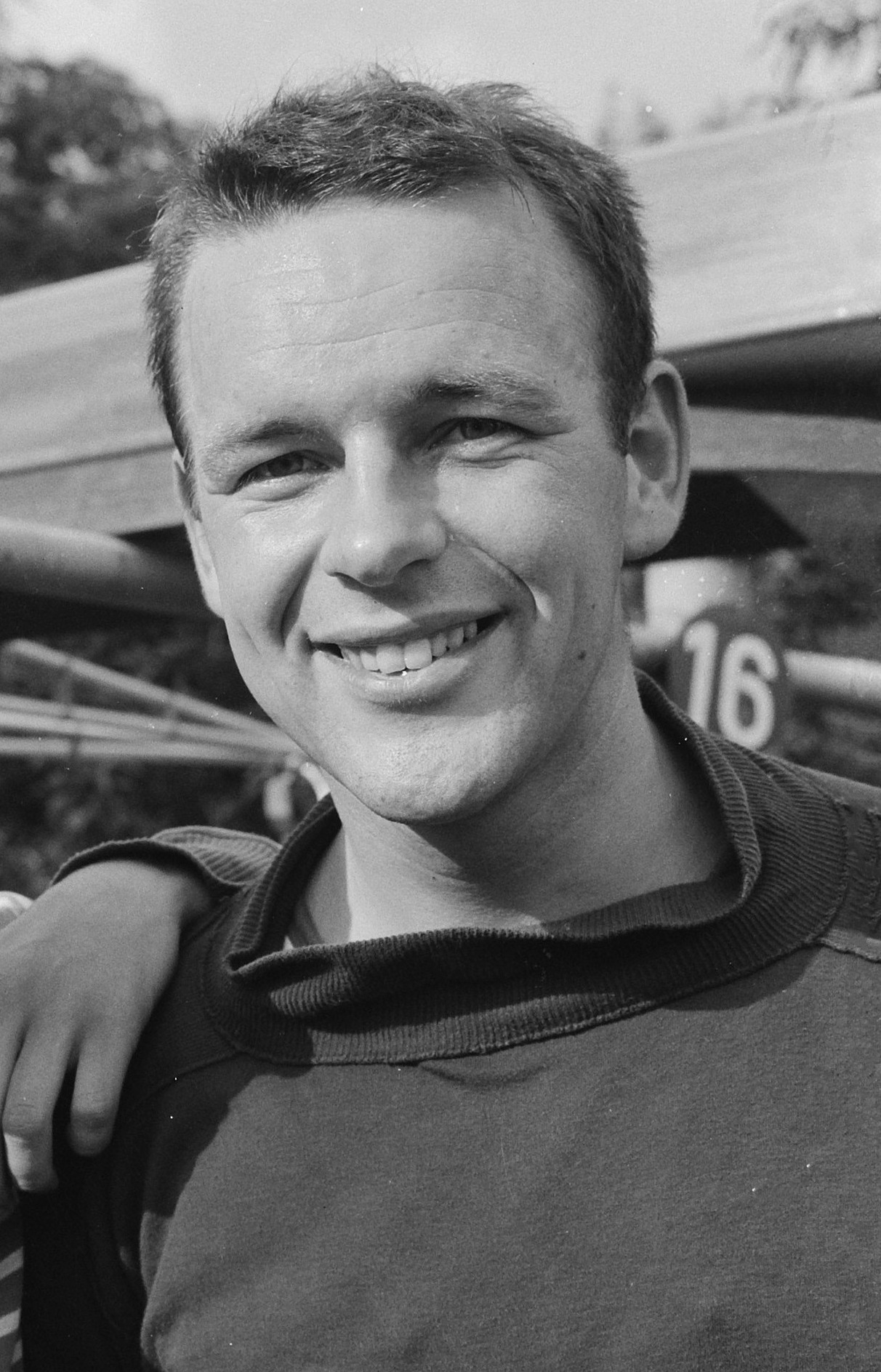
- Alwin in 1964

Personal information
- Born: 17 June 1939 Amsterdam, the Netherlands
- Died: 22 December 1995 (aged 56) Singapore
- Height: 1.85 m (6 ft 1 in)
- Weight: 82 kg (181 lb)

Sport
- Sport: Rowing
- Club: Willem III, Amsterdam

Max Bruno Alwin (17 June 1939 – 22 December 1995) was a Dutch rower. He competed in the double sculls event at the 1964 Summer Olympics, together with Peter Bots, and finished in eighth place.
