= 1960 European Rowing Championships =

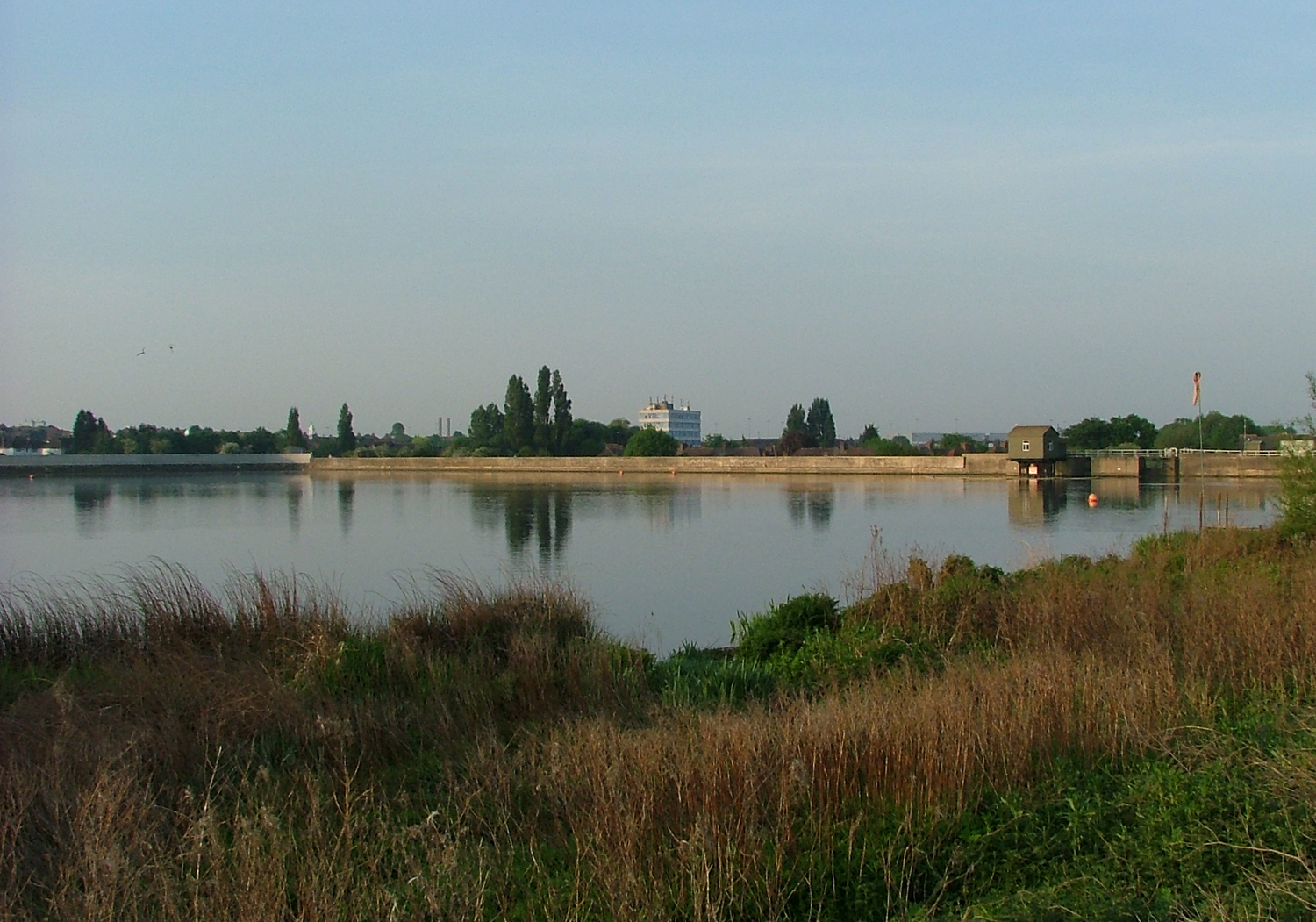
- View of the reservoir dam
- Venue: Welsh Harp Reservoir
- Location: Willesden, London, England
- Dates: 12–14 August 1960
- Nations: 12

The 1960 European Rowing Championships were rowing championships held on the Welsh Harp Reservoir in the London suburb of Willesden in England. This edition of the European Rowing Championships was for women only and was held from 12 to 14 August. Twelve countries contested five boat classes (W1x, W2x, W4x+, W4+, W8+). Men would compete later that month in Italy for the 1960 Summer Olympics.

== German participation ==
Neither FISA, the International Rowing Federation, nor the International Olympic Committee recognised East Germany as a country and insisted on one German team per boat class. The two German rowing associations first met at the Café Warsaw in East Berlin in January 1960 and agreed that qualification races would be held for both the European Championships and the Olympic Games, with the details to be agreed on at a further meeting in March. Further negotiations in Hanover during April were difficult, with West German representatives rejecting suggestions by East German delegates. At further negotiations in Berlin in Mai, it was agreed that qualification races for the European Championships and the Olympic Games would be dealt with separately. In the end, the West German view of having a single regatta decide the representation prevailed, and Olympic qualifications were decided on 6 August on the Wedau Regatta Course in Duisburg. The qualifications for the European Championships were held at the same weekend, but it is not clear from media reporting whether this happened at the same venue. With East German women dominant in rowing, the West Germans contested the double scull boat class only, but that race was won by East Germany. Thus, all German representatives in London were from East Germany.

== Medal summary – women's events ==
Event	Gold		Silver		Bronze	
Event	Country & rowers	Time	Country & rowers	Time	Country & rowers	Time
W1x	Hungary; Kornélia Pap	4:40.40	Soviet Union; Zossia Rakitskaya		Austria; Eva Sika	
W2x	Soviet Union; Nina Ivanova; Lyudmila Otrosko	3:54.75	Czechoslovakia; Alena Postlová; Eva Kolarova		Romania; Magda Jifcu; Dora Lakatos	
W4+	Soviet Union; Valentina Terekhova; Nadezhda Skunkova; Ella Sergeyeva; Nina Shamanova; Valentina Timofeyeva (cox)	3:39.75	Romania; Emilia Rigard; Ana Tamas; Florica Ghiuzelea; Felicia Urziceanu; Stefania Borisov (cox)	3:40.49	East Germany; Christa Temeier; Barbara Reichel; Hanna Vesper; Helga Nollau; Sigrid Laube	3:48.22
W4x+	East Germany; Herta Weissig; Gisela Heisse; Hannelore Göttlich; Helga Menzel-Richter; Karla Frister (cox)	3:39.60	Romania; Magda Jifcu; Viorica Udrescu; Doina Ciolacu; Dumitra Mihalache; Stefania Borisov (cox)	3:42.70	Hungary; Agnes Kovacsics; Erzsebet Mozer; Jozsefne Rasko; Laszlone Terelmes; Rudolfne Radvanyi (cox)	3:43.07
W8+	Soviet Union; Valentina Sirsikova; Vera Rebrova; Nonna Petsernikova; Lidiya Sontova; Sinaida Kirillina; Nina Korobkova; Zinaida Korotova; Nadezhda Gontsarova; Valentina Dobrogjeyeva (cox)	3:23.70	East Germany; Anita Blankenfeld; Ingeborg Peter; Ingrid Drews; Waltraud Dinter; Hilde Amelang; Marianne Schulze; Marianne Mewes; Marianne Falk; Elfriede Boetius (cox)	3:32.21	Romania; Maria Trinks; Dana Iliescu; Gabriela Stefan; Olimpia Bogdan; Marta Kardos; Stela Gavan; Sonia Bulugioiu; Viorica Udrescu; Angela Paunescu (cox)	3:35.64

== Medals table ==
Rank	Nation	Gold	Silver	Bronze	Total
1	Soviet Union (URS)	3	1	0	4
2	East Germany (GDR)	1	1	1	3
3	Hungary (HUN)	1	0	1	2
4	Romania (ROM)	0	2	2	4
5	Czechoslovakia (TCH)	0	1	0	1
6	Austria (AUT)	0	0	1	1
Totals (6 entries)		5	5	5	15
