= Horst Kuttelwascher =

Austrian rower

Personal information
- Nationality: Austrian
- Born: 6 October 1937 Prittlbach, Germany
- Died: 26 July 2016 (aged 78)
- Relatives: Helmuth Kuttelwascher (brother)

Sport
- Sport: Rowing
Medal record
Men's rowing
Representing Austria
World Rowing Championships
Bronze medal – third place	1962 Lucerne	Coxless four

Horst Kuttelwascher (6 October 1937 – 26 July 2016) was an Austrian rower. He competed at the 1960 Summer Olympics and the 1964 Summer Olympics. Helmuth Kuttelwascher, also a rower, is his brother. Together, they won a bronze medal at the inaugural 1962 World Rowing Championships in the coxless four event.
