= Penny Chuter =

British rower, rowing coach and official (1942–2024)

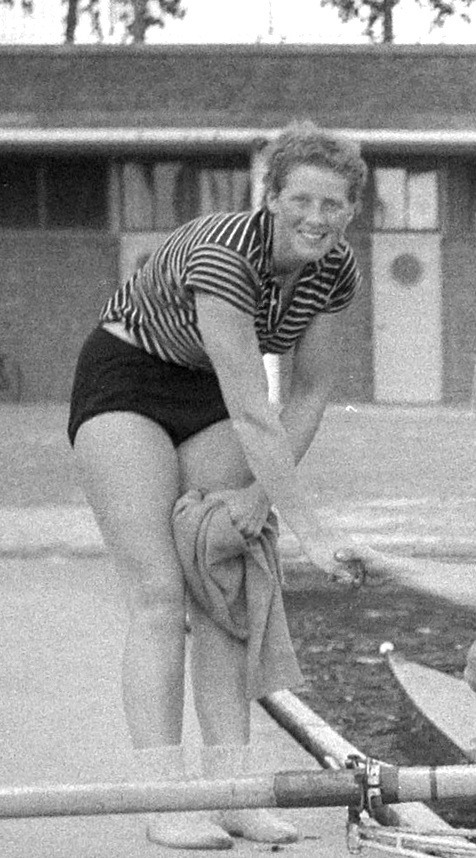
- Chuter in 1964

Personal information
- Born: 28 July 1942 Dunfermline, Fife, Scotland
- Died: 16 November 2024 (aged 82) Mylor Bridge, Cornwall, England
- Height: 1.72 m (5 ft 8 in)
- Weight: 89 kg (196 lb)

Sport
- Sport: Rowing
- Club: Laleham Skiff and Punting Club, The Skiff Club, Thames Valley Skiff Club, United Universities Women’s Boat Club, Burway Rowing Club, Thames Rowing Club, Leander Club, Wallingford Rowing Club, Carrick Rowing Club Cornwall
Medal record
Representing Great Britain
European Rowing Championships
Silver medal – second place	1962 East Berlin	Single sculls

Penelope Ann Chuter, OBE (28 July 1942 – 16 November 2024) was a British international sculler, rowing coach and rowing administrator.

== Early life ==
Chuter was born in Dunfermline, Scotland, in July 1942. Her mother, Gladys Vine-Jackman, was a competitive swimmer, and had been selected for the 1932 Olympic Games, but had not been able to afford to go. Her father, Derek Chuter, worked in films. After the end of the second world war, Chuter and her family moved to Laleham, Middlesex, where they lived by the river Thames. From the age of five, Chuter rowed across the river to attend primary school.

== Punting, sculling and rowing career ==
Chuter joined the Laleham skiff and punting club at the age of 12. She won her first punting championship in 1957, aged 15, and her first sculling championship in 1958.

Chuter competed for Great Britain in the women's single scull event at the European Rowing Championships each year from 1960 to 1964, winning the silver medal in 1962. She was not able to compete in the Olympic games at the time, as the Olympic regatta was restricted to men. In 1964, she retired from international competition and started training as a physical education teacher.

In 1973, the Amateur Rowing Association (ARA) appointed Chuter as its first national coach with responsibility for women's rowing. She remained with the ARA for about twenty years, becoming its chief coach for men's rowing from 1979 to 1982, then Director of Coaching from 1982 to 1986 and Director of International Rowing from 1986 to 1990. Her trainees included a 1992 Olympian Wade Hall-Craggs. In 1994 Chuter was appointed chief coach to the Oxford University Boat Club, and then in 1997, she moved to work for Sport England. Chuter retired in 2002, and moved to Cornwall.

In Cornwall, Chuter continued to row and sail. She helped to found the Carrick rowing club in Falmouth, and was a coach at the Flushing & Mylor pilot gig club in Flushing, Cornwall. Chuter helped to guide Flushing and Mylor to a silver medal at the World Pilot Gig Championships in 2016.

== Death ==
Chuter died in Mylor Bridge, Cornwall on 16 November 2024, at the age of 82.

== Awards and recognition ==
Chuter received an OBE in 1989, and the FISA Distinguished Services to Rowing Award in 2006. She was also recognised with the British Amateur Rowing Association medal of honour in 2006.

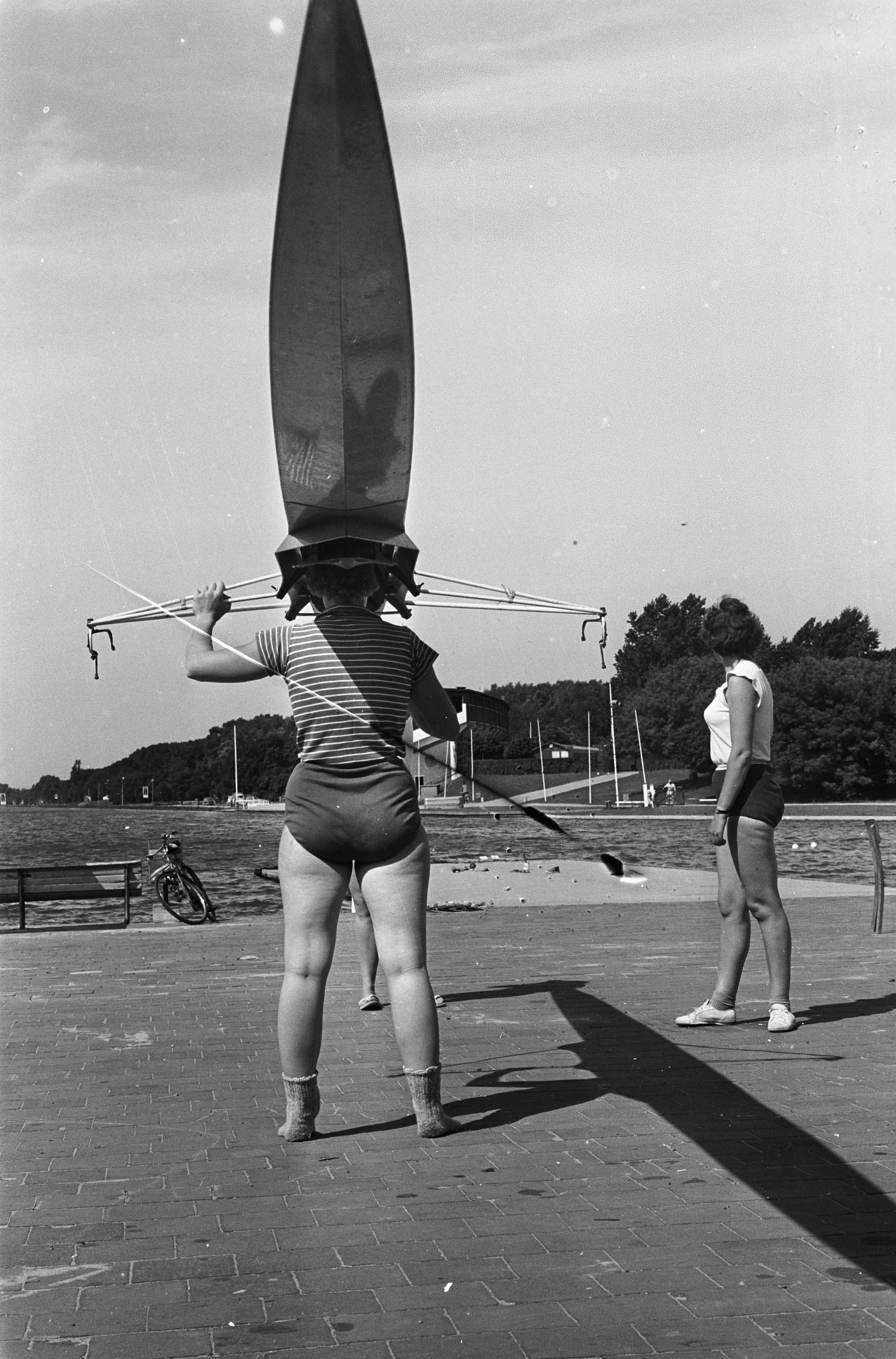
Chuter carrying single scull (1964)
