= Wolfgang Neuß (rower) =

German rower

Sport
- Sport: Rowing
Medal record
Men's rowing
Representing West Germany
World Rowing Championships
Gold medal – first place	1962 Lucerne	Coxed pair
European Championships
Gold medal – first place	1963 Copenhagen	Coxed pair

Wolfgang Neuß is a German rower. He won a gold medal at the 1962 World Rowing Championships in Lucerne with the men's coxed pair.
