= Roberto Friedrich =

Mexican rower (born 1945)

Personal information
- Born: 9 May 1945 (age 80) Mexico City, Mexico

Sport
- Sport: Rowing

Roberto Friedrich (born 9 May 1945) is a Mexican rower. He competed at the 1964 Summer Olympics and the 1968 Summer Olympics. He was also a former diplomat, serving as Mexican Ambassador to Germany.
