= Michel De Meulemeester =

Belgian rower (1943–2000)

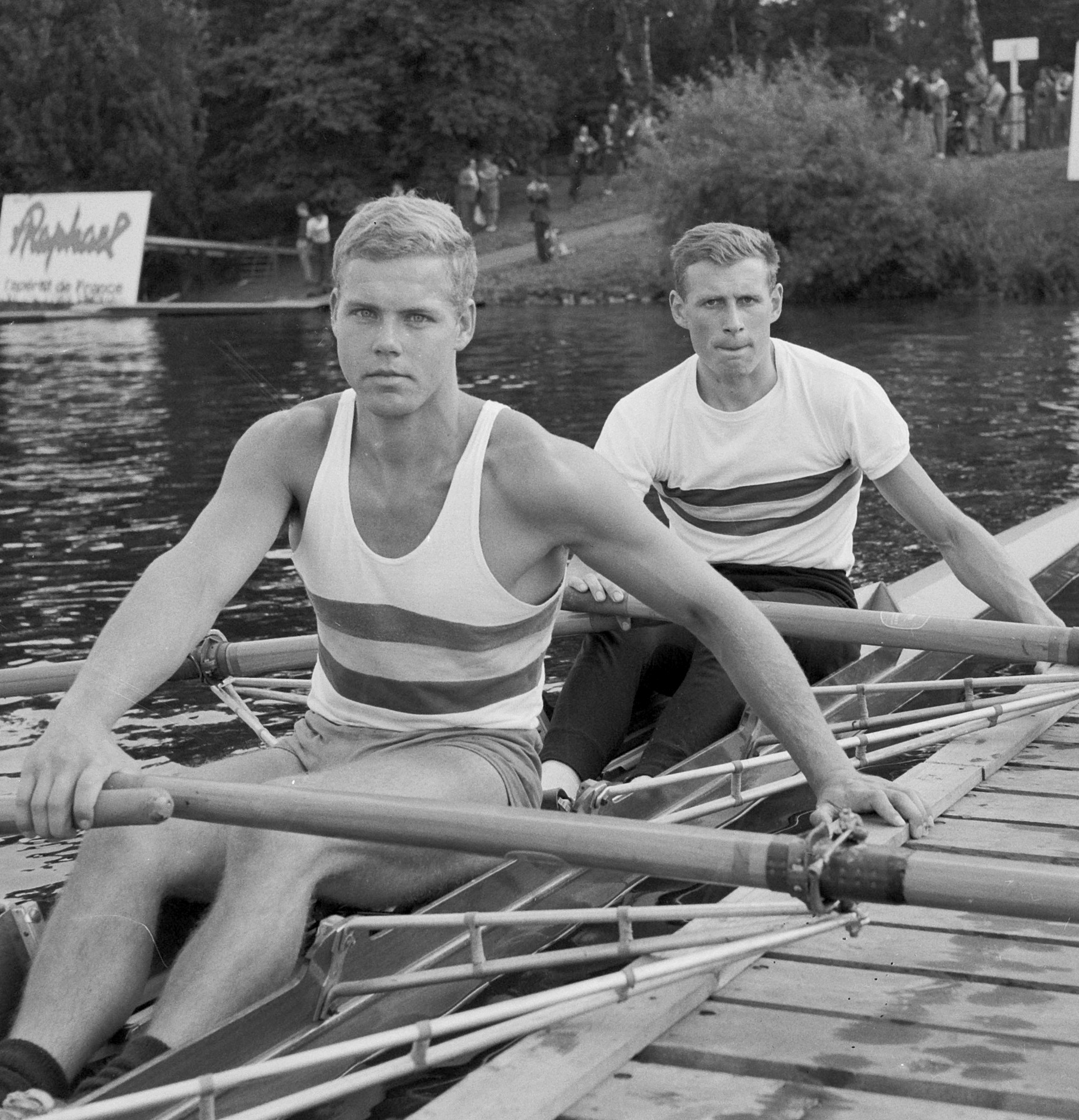
- Michel De Meulemeester (left) and Claude Dehombreux in 1965

Personal information
- Born: 21 May 1943 Brasschaat
- Died: 23 November 2000 (aged 57) Seville
- Height: 1.80 m (5 ft 11 in)
- Weight: 77 kg (170 lb)

Sport
- Sport: Rowing
- Club: ARV, Antwerpen

Michel Theodoor de Meulemeester (21 May 1943 – 23 November 2000) was a Belgian rower. He competed at the 1964 Summer Olympics in the double sculls event, with Gérard Higny, and finished in ninth place.
