= 1962 World Rowing Championships =

International rowing event

- Venue: Rotsee
- Location: Lucerne, Switzerland
- Dates: 6–9 September
- Competitors: 401 from 24 nations

The 1962 World Rowing Championships were the inaugural world championships in rowing. The competition was held in September 1962 on the Rotsee in Lucerne, Switzerland. Rowers from West Germany dominated the competition, winning five of the seven boat classes.

== Background ==
The Fédération Internationale des Sociétés d'Aviron (FISA) decided in 1961 that, like at the Olympics, rowers from the whole world should compete for a championship title; thus far, they had only organised the European Rowing Championships, although they were open to rowers from outside of Europe. Prior to the 1974 World Rowing Championships, only men competed. Seven boat classes were part of the inaugural world championships that was held from 6 to 9 September on the Swiss Rotsee. There were 401 competitors from 24 countries (counting East and West Germany as one country) with 107 boats at the competition. Between 13 (double scull) and 17 (coxless pair) competed per boat class.

=== German rowers ===
FISA did not recognise East Germany, hence only one German crew was permitted per event. Selection trials between East and West German crews were held on 3 September on the Rotsee, three days before the start of the championships. As was predicted by East German media outlets, West German crews would win in six of the seven categories, with 1960 Olympic single scull silver medal winner Achim Hill the only successful East German qualifier, beating Edgar Heidorn from Hanover. During the world championships, Hill did not proceed beyond the heats, though.

== Medal summary ==
Medalists at the 1962 World Rowing Championships:

=== Men's events ===
Event	Gold		Silver		Bronze	
Event	Country & rowers	Time	Country & rowers	Time	Country & rowers	Time
M1x	Soviet Union; Vyacheslav Ivanov	7:07.09	Great Britain; Stuart Mackenzie	7:10.67	United States; Seymour Cromwell	7:11.88
M2x	France; René Duhamel; Bernard Monnereau	6:33.90	Soviet Union; Boris Dubrovskiy; Oleg Tyurin	6:34.74	West Germany; Jost Krause-Wichmann; Josef Steffes-Mies	6:34.92
M2-	West Germany; Dieter Bender; Günther Zumkeller	6:54.62	Soviet Union; Valentin Boreyko; Oleg Golovanov	6:58.19	Switzerland; Hugo Waser; Adolf Waser	7:05.59
M2+	West Germany; Wolfgang Neuß; Klaus-Günter Jordan; Frank Steinhäuser	7:19.10	Romania; Ionel Petrov; Carol Vereș; Oprea Păunescu	7:22.60	Soviet Union; Vladimir Smirnov; Valeriy Polkovski; Igor Rudakov	7:24.17
M4-	West Germany; Gerd Wolter; Dagobert Thometschek; Peter Paustian; Christian Prey	6:19.24	France; André Fevret; Roger Chatelain; Philippe Malivoire; Jean-Pierre Drivet	6:21.78	Austria; Dieter Losert; Dieter Ebner; Horst Kuttelwascher; Helmuth Kuttelwascher	
M4+	West Germany; Bernd-Jürgen Marschner; Peter Neusel; Bernhard Britting; Manfred Ross; Jürgen Oelke	6:29.12	France; Jean Ledoux; Émile Clerc; André Sloth; Pierre Maddaloni; Alain Bouffard	6:31.93	Soviet Union; Boris Fyodorov; Yury Suslin; Yuriy Tyukalov; Anatoli Fedorov; Igor Rudakov	6:33.30
M8+	West Germany; Horst Meyer; Jürgen Plagemann; Klaus Aeffke; Klaus Behrens; Hans-Jürgen Wallbrecht; Karl-Heinrich von Groddeck; Ingo Kliefoth; Bernd Kruse; Thomas Ahrens	5:50.83	Soviet Union; Ričardas Vaitkevičius; Antanas Bagdonavičius; Zigmas Jukna; Viktor Semyonov; Vytautas Briedis; Petras Karla; Yaroslav Cherstvy; Juozas Jagelavičius; Yuriy Lorentsson	5:53.56	France; Christian Puibaraud; Jean-Louis Bellet; Jacques Morel; Joseph Moroni; Georges Morel; Robert Dumontois; Bernard Meynadier; Michel Viaud; Alain Bouffard	5:55.36

=== Event codes ===
	Single scull	Double scull	Coxless pair	Coxed pair	Coxless four	Coxed four	Eight
Men's	M1x	M2x	M2-	M2+	M4-	M4+	M8+

== Medal table ==
Country	(gold) Gold	(silver) Silver	(bronze) Bronze	Total
West Germany	5	0	1	6
Soviet Union	1	3	2	6
France	1	2	1	4
Great Britain	0	1	0	1
Romania	0	1	0	1
Austria	0	0	1	1
Switzerland	0	0	1	1
United States	0	0	1	1
Total	7	7	7	21

The countries that did compete but did not win medals were Denmark and the Netherlands (they had entered 7 boats each), Czechoslovakia (6 boats), Norway and Poland (5 boats each), Belgium, Japan and Sweden (4 boats each), Australia, Finland and Canada (3 boats each), Israel, Yugoslavia, and Hungary (2 boats each), and New Zealand and Portugal (1 boat each).

== Finals ==
Event	1st	2nd	3rd	4th	5th	6th
M1x	Soviet Union	Great Britain	United States	Netherlands	Switzerland	New Zealand
M2x	France	Soviet Union	West Germany	Czechoslovakia	Great Britain	Netherlands
M2-	West Germany	Soviet Union	Switzerland	Poland	Finland	Netherlands
M2+	West Germany	Romania	Soviet Union	Denmark	United States	Poland
M4-	West Germany	France	Austria	Italy	Switzerland	Romania
M4+	West Germany	France	Soviet Union	Poland	Australia	Romania
M8+	West Germany	Soviet Union	France	Italy	Australia	Canada
