= Fernando Scheffler =

Mexican rower (born 1945)

Personal information
- Born: 30 May 1945 (age 79); Mexico City, Mexico

Sport
- Sport: Rowing

Fernando Scheffler (born 30 May 1945) is a Mexican rower. He competed at the 1964 Summer Olympics and the 1968 Summer Olympics.
