= Peter Bots =

Dutch rower (born 1942)

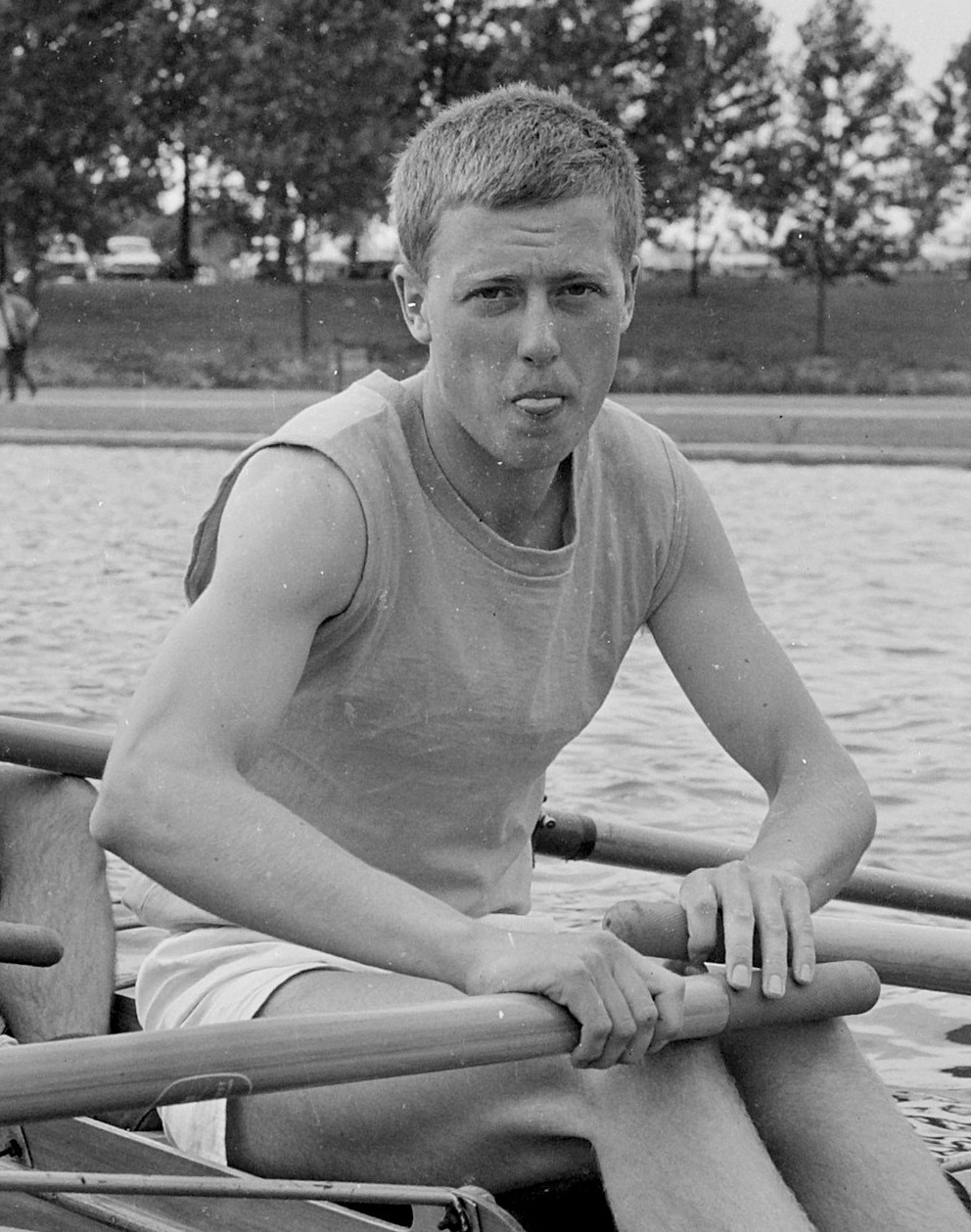
- Bots in 1964

Personal information
- Born: 25 January 1942 (age 84) Amsterdam, Netherlands
- Height: 1.82 m (6 ft 0 in)
- Weight: 73 kg (161 lb)

Sport
- Sport: Rowing
- Club: KDR&ZV, Dordrecht

Peter Frits Bots (born 25 January 1942) is a retired Dutch rower. He competed in the double sculls event at the 1964 Summer Olympics, together with Max Alwin, and finished in eighth place.
