= 1955 European Rowing Championships (women) =

International rowing event

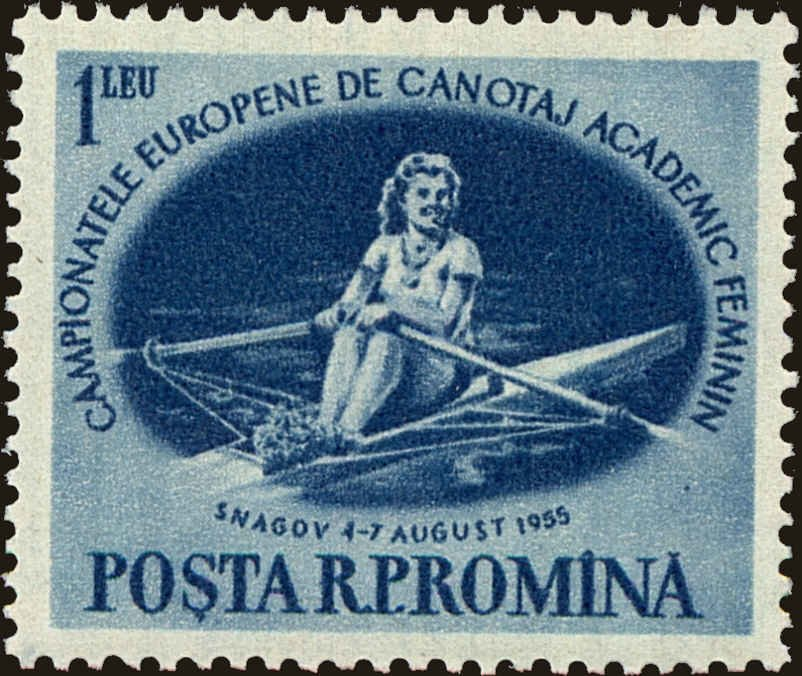
- Location: Bucharest, Romania
- Dates: 4–7 August 1955

The 1955 European Rowing Championships for women were rowing championships held in the Romanian capital city of Bucharest from 4 to 7 August. The competition for men was held later in the month in Ghent. The women competed in five boat classes (W1x, W2x, W4x+, W4+, W8+).

== German participation ==
The National Olympic Committee of the GDR was granted provisional membership in 1955 and as a next step, East Germany tried to gain membership of the individual sporting organisations that participated in Olympic disciplines. In July 1955, the East German rowing association applied for a license from FISA, the International Rowing Federation, to be able to nominate their rowers at the European Championships in Bucharest (women) and Ghent (men). FISA's response was that the next congress, to be held just prior to the championships in Ghent, will decide on the matter. Therefore, East German teams could not compete in 1955. At the congress, East Germany was unanimously accepted as a new member. The only West German competitor was Ingrid Scholz, who had won silver in single sculls in 1954; she came sixth in 1955.

== Medal summary – women's events ==
Event	Gold		Silver		Bronze	
Event	Country & rowers	Time	Country & rowers	Time	Country & rowers	Time
W1x	Soviet Union; Roza Chumakova	3:40.1	Austria; Eva Sika	3:40.9	Hungary; Kornélia Pap	3:44.6
W2x	Soviet Union; Nina Opalenko; Ekaterina Semlyanskaya	3:48.4	Romania; Elisabeta Gyorgy; Edith Schwartz	3:51.9	Czechoslovakia; Svetla Bartakova; Hana Musilova	3:53.4
W4+	Soviet Union; Olimpiada Mikhaylova; Galina Putyrskaya; Lyudmila Blasko; Natalya Morozova; Vera Savrimovich (cox)	3:39.5	Romania; Etelca Laub; Elsa Oxenfeld; Ecaterina Erdos; Elisabeta Kormos; Stefania Gurau (cox)	3:47.7	Czechoslovakia; Anna Javurkova; Eva Jindrova; Marta Brozova; Julia Sucha; Beluse Koluchova (cox)	3:48.2
W4x+	Soviet Union; Yevgenia Tserbakova; Lidiya Zontova; Galina Kopilova; Lyubov Danilova; Viktoriya Dobrodeeva (cox)	3:34.5	Romania; Stela Stanciu; Florica Bruteanu; Maria Bucur-Maimon; Maria Laub; Stefania Gurau (cox)	3:42.6	Hungary; Andrasne Solyom; Istvanne Granek; Jozsefne Rasko; Ida Orodan; Ilona Skotniczky (cox)	3:43.5
W8+	Soviet Union; Lyudmila Matveyeva; Vera Taranda; Alexandra Afonykina; Vera Mikhaylova; Nina Korobkova; Zinaida Korotova; Zinaida Trofimova; Tamara Stolyarova; Maria Fomicheva (cox)	3:17.8	Romania; Felicia Urziceanu; Marta Kardos; Sonia Bulugioiu; Rita Schob; Iuliana Toganel; Ghizela Rostas; Emilia Rigard; Lucia Dumitrescu; Angela Codreanu (cox)	3:24.0	Hungary; Rozsa Albert; Jenöne Sarközi; Margit Horvath; Imrene Kemeny; Janosne Sprinzl; Janosne Szöke; Gyözöne Lukachich; Istvanne Hambalgo; Antalne Benedek (cox)	3:35.2
