= Helmuth Kuttelwascher =

Austrian rower

Personal information
- Nationality: Austrian
- Born: 18 March 1940 (age 86) Klagenfurt, Nazi Germany
- Relatives: Horst Kuttelwascher (brother)

Sport
- Sport: Rowing
Medal record
Men's rowing
Representing Austria
World Rowing Championships
Bronze medal – third place	1962 Lucerne	Coxless four

Helmuth Kuttelwascher (born 18 March 1940) is an Austrian rower. He competed in the men's coxed four event at the 1960 Summer Olympics. Horst Kuttelwascher, also a rower, is his brother. Together, they won a bronze medal at the inaugural 1962 World Rowing Championships in the coxless four event.
