= Boris Dubrovskiy =

Russian rower (1939–2023)

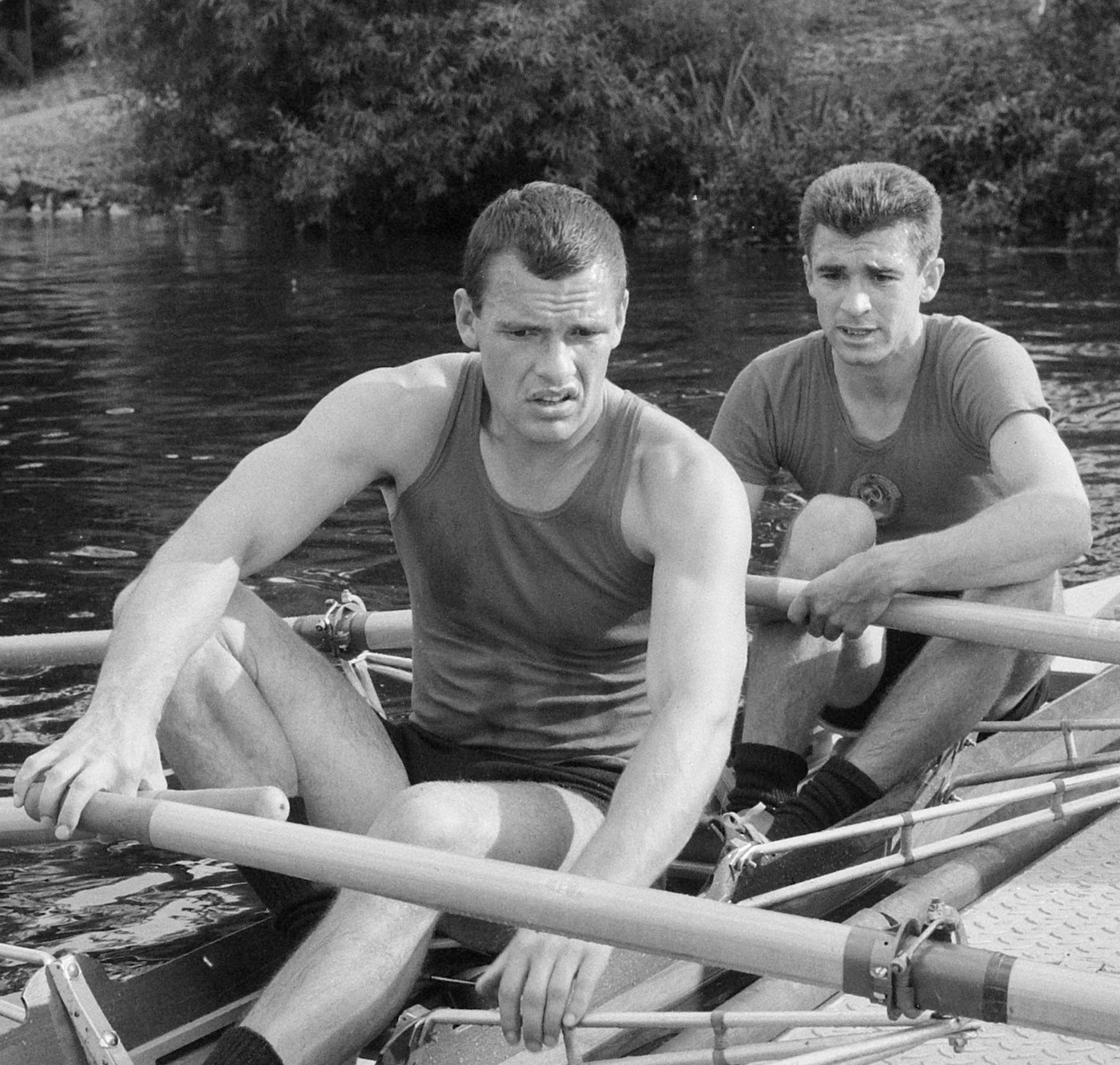
- Tyurin and Dubrovsky (right) in 1965

Personal information
- Born: 8 October 1939 Moscow, Russian SFSR, USSR
- Died: 14 August 2023 (aged 83)
- Height: 1.81 m (5 ft 11 in)
- Weight: 74 kg (163 lb)

Sport
- Sport: Rowing
- Club: SKA Moscow
Medal record
Representing the Soviet Union
Olympic Games
Gold medal – first place	1964 Tokyo	Double sculls
World Rowing Championships
Silver medal – second place	1962 Lucerne	Double sculls
European Rowing Championships
Bronze medal – third place	1963 Copenhagen	Double sculls
Gold medal – first place	1964 Amsterdam	Double sculls
Silver medal – second place	1965 Duisburg	Double sculls

Boris Yakovlevich Dubrovsky (Russian: Борис Яковлевич Дубровский, 8 October 1939 – 14 August 2023) was a Russian rower who had his best achievements in the double sculls, partnering with Oleg Tyurin. In this event, they won an Olympic gold in 1964 and four medals at European and world championships in 1962–1965.

== Biography ==
Dubrovsky was born to teachers Yakov Vasilievich Dubrovsky (1903–?) and Natalya Timofeevna Kuvaeva (1909–?) and has a sister Masha (born 1941). He has a PhD in theoretical physics, and from 1967 to 2003 taught calculus in a university. There he met his wife, Evgeniya Aleksandrovna, a mathematician. They had a son, Timofei (born 1964), who moved to the United States in the 1990s.

Boris Dubrovskiy died on 14 August 2023, at the age of 83.
