= Otto Kuttelwascher =

Otto Kuttelwascher is an Austrian Righteous Among the Nations.

He lived in Vienna, together with his wife Hermine "Mina" Kuttelwascher and three children. A Jewish family, 2 girls and their parents, was living next to them.

The father of the Jewish family died under the pressure that the Nazis put on him. One of the daughters was sent to a collective apartment for Jews. Otto and Hermine offered the other girl, Erna Kohn, to stay at their apartment. She survived the war and later emigrated to America.
