= Klaus-Günter Jordan =

West German rower (1940–2011)

Personal information
- Born: 17 September 1940
- Died: 7 December 2011 (aged 71)

Sport
- Sport: Rowing
- Club: RC Nassovia Höchst
Medal record
Men's rowing
Representing West Germany
World Rowing Championships
| Gold medal – first place | 1962 Lucerne | Coxed pair |
European Championships
| Gold medal – first place | 1963 Copenhagen | Coxed pair |

Klaus-Günter Jordan (often spelled Günther and known as Beppo, 17 September 1940 – 7 December 2011) was a West German rower.

Jordan was born in 1940. He started rowing at RC Nassovia Höchst at age 15. He won a gold medal at the 1962 World Rowing Championships in Lucerne with the men's coxed pair.

Jordan died on 7 December 2011 after a short illness.
