= Rowing at the 1964 Summer Olympics – Men's coxed pair =

Men's coxed pair at the Games of the XVIII Olympiad
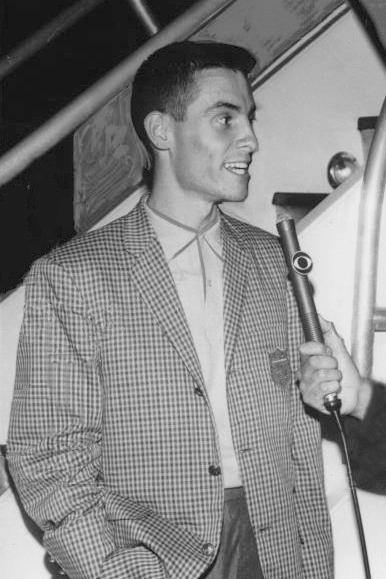
- Gold medal coxswain Kent Mitchell (1960)
- Venue: Toda Rowing Course
- Dates: 11–15 October 1964
- Competitors: 48 from 16 nations
- Winning time: 8:21.23

Medalists
1st place, gold medalist(s)		Edward Ferry; Conn Findlay; Kent Mitchell (cox); United States
2nd place, silver medalist(s)		Jacques Morel; Georges Morel; Jean-Claude Darouy (cox); France
3rd place, bronze medalist(s)		Herman Rouwé; Erik Hartsuiker; Jan Just Bos (cox); Netherlands

The men's coxed pair event was a rowing event conducted as part of the 1964 Summer Olympics programme. It was held from 11 to 15 October. There were 16 boats (48 competitors) from 16 nations, with each nation limited to a single boat in the event. The event was won by American crew Edward Ferry, Conn Findlay, and coxswain Kent Mitchell. Findlay had been on the United States gold medal crew in 1956 and bronze medal crew in 1960; he was the first man to earn two gold medals in the event, as well as the first man to win three medals of any color in the event. Mitchell had also been on the 1960 crew, and was the seventh man to earn multiple medals in the coxed pair. Jacques Morel, Georges Morel, and cox Jean-Claude Darouy took silver to earn France's first medal in the event since 1952 (the last time a French team had competed). Herman Rouwé, Erik Hartsuiker, Jan Just Bos earned what was formally the Netherlands' first medal in the event; a pair of Dutch rowers had won the first edition in 1900, but had jettisoned their cox in favor of a local French boy between rounds and thus that medal was a "mixed team" medal.

== Background ==
This was the 11th appearance of the event. Rowing had been on the programme in 1896 but was cancelled due to bad weather. The men's coxed pair was one of the original four events in 1900, but was not held in 1904, 1908, or 1912. It returned to the programme after World War I and was held every Games from 1924 to 1992, when it (along with the men's coxed four) was replaced with the men's lightweight double sculls and men's lightweight coxless four.

Six of the 18 competitors from the 1960 coxed pair final returned: Igor Rudakov, the coxswain from the silver medal Soviet Union team; Conn Findlay and Kent Mitchell, rower and coxswain from the bronze medal United States team (Findlay had also won gold in 1956); Jens Berendt Jensen and Knud Nielsen, rowers from the fourth-place Denmark team; and Gheorghe Riffelt, a rower from the sixth-place Romania team. The United Team of Germany sent an East German crew that had won the European championships instead of a West German crew that had won the inaugural World Championship. The American crew had won the 1963 Pan American Games.

Argentina's crew included coxswain Oscar Rompani, at age 60 the oldest Olympic rower.

No nations made their debut in the event. France and the United States each made their ninth appearance, tied for most among nations to that point.

== Competition format ==
The coxed pair event featured three-person boats, with two rowers and a coxswain. It was a sweep rowing event, with the rowers each having one oar (and thus each rowing on one side). The course used the 2000 metres distance that became the Olympic standard in 1912 (with the exception of 1948).

This rowing competition consisted of two main rounds (semifinals and finals), as well as a repechage round that allowed teams that did not win their semifinal heats to advance to the main final. The competition introduced the "B" or "consolation" final, which ranked boats 7 through 12.

- Semifinals: Three heats. With 16 boats entered, there were five or six boats per heat. The winner of each heat advanced directly to the final; all other boats went to the repechage.
- Repechage: Three heats. With 13 boats racing in but not winning their initial heats, there were four or five boats per repechage heat. The top boat in each repechage heat advanced to the "A" final, the second and third place boats in each heat went to the "B" final, and the fourth and (where applicable) fifth place boats were eliminated.
- Finals: The "A" final consisted of the six boats that had won either the preliminary heats or the repechage heats; the "B" final was a ranking final for the 7th through 12th place boats (which had placed 2nd or 3rd in their repechage heats).

== Schedule ==
All times are Japan Standard Time (UTC+9)

Date	Time	Round
Sunday, 11 October 1964	15:00	Semifinals
Tuesday, 13 October 1964	10:00	Repechage
Wednesday, 14 October 1964	15:00	Final B
Thursday, 15 October 1964	15:00	Final A

== Results ==
=== Semifinals ===
The top crew in each heat advanced to the final, with all others sent to the repechages.

==== Semifinal 1 ====
Rank	Rowers	Coxswain	Nation	Time	Notes
1	Ed Ferry; Conn Findlay	Kent Mitchell	United States	7:53.17	QA
2	Herman Rouwé; Erik Hartsuiker	Jan-Just Bos	Netherlands	7:56.80	R
3	Václav Chalupa Sr. Jiří Palko	Zdeněk Mejstřík	Czechoslovakia	8:00.07	R
4	Alfred Sageder; Josef Kloimstein	Peter Salzbacher	Austria	8:01.22	R
5	Günter Bergau; Peter Gorny	Karl-Heinz Danielowski	United Team of Germany	8:02.99	R
6	Hugo Waser; Adolf Waser	Werner Ehrensperger	Switzerland	8:09.16	R

==== Semifinal 2 ====
Rank	Rowers	Coxswain	Nation	Time	Notes
1	Jacques Morel; Georges Morel	Jean-Claude Darouy	France	7:53.14	QA
2	Nikolay Safronov; Leonid Rakovshchik	Igor Rudakov	Soviet Union	7:53.15	R
3	Bruce Richardson; Neil Lodding	Wayne Gammon	Australia	8:09.15	R
4	Ante Guberina; Slavko Janjušević	Zdenko Balaš	Yugoslavia	8:20.33	R
5	Mohamed El-Halawani; Mahmoud Nasser	Abdullah Ali	Egypt	8:22.99	R

==== Semifinal 3 ====
Rank	Rowers	Coxswain	Nation	Time	Notes
1	Kazimierz Naskręcki; Marian Siejkowski	Stanisław Kozera	Poland	7:55.79	QA
2	Gheorghe Riffelt; Ionel Petrov	Oprea Păunescu	Romania	8:02.34	R
3	Jens Berendt Jensen; Knud Nielsen	Niels Olsen	Denmark	8:08.98	R
4	Natalio Rossi; Juan Pedro Lier	Oscar Rompani	Argentina	8:19.63	R
5	Toshihiro Hamada; Katsuhiko Ihara	Masahiro Takatsuki	Japan	8:32.51	R

=== Repechage ===
The top finisher in each of the three repechages joined the finalists. The second and third place finishers competed in a consolation final for 7th to 12th places. All other crews were eliminated.

==== Repechage heat 1 ====
Rank	Rowers	Coxswain	Nation	Time	Notes
1	Nikolay Safronov; Leonid Rakovshchik	Igor Rudakov	Soviet Union	7:19.64	QA
2	Günter Bergau; Peter Gorny	Karl-Heinz Danielowski	United Team of Germany	7:22.96	QB
3	Alfred Sageder; Josef Kloimstein	Peter Salzbacher	Austria	7:30.72	QB
4	Jens Berendt Jensen; Knud Nielsen	Niels Olsen	Denmark	7:39.39	

==== Repechage 2 ====
Rank	Rowers	Coxswain	Nation	Time	Notes
1	Václav Chalupa Sr. Jiří Palko	Zdeněk Mejstřík	Czechoslovakia	7:28.61	QA
2	Hugo Waser; Adolf Waser	Werner Ehrensperger	Switzerland	7:30.60	QB
3	Gheorghe Riffelt; Ionel Petrov	Oprea Păunescu	Romania	7:38.36	QB
4	Ante Guberina; Slavko Janjušević	Zdenko Balaš	Yugoslavia	7:40.89	
5	Mohamed El-Halawani; Mahmoud Nasser	Abdullah Ali	Egypt	7:43.54	

==== Repechage 3 ====
Rank	Rowers	Coxswain	Nation	Time	Notes
1	Herman Rouwé; Erik Hartsuiker	Jan-Just Bos	Netherlands	7:28.58	QA
2	Bruce Richardson; Neil Lodding	Wayne Gammon	Australia	7:37.53	QB
3	Natalio Rossi; Juan Pedro Lier	Oscar Rompani	Argentina	7:44.62	QB
4	Toshihiro Hamada; Katsuhiko Ihara	Masahiro Takatsuki	Japan	8:05.30	

=== Finals ===
==== Final B ====
The consolation final determined places from 7th to 12th.

Rank	Rowers	Coxswain	Nation	Time
7	Günter Bergau; Peter Gorny	Karl-Heinz Danielowski	United Team of Germany	7:27.98
8	Alfred Sageder; Josef Kloimstein	Peter Salzbacher	Austria	7:31.65
9	Bruce Richardson; Neil Lodding	Wayne Gammon	Australia	7:32.54
10	Gheorghe Riffelt; Ionel Petrov	Oprea Păunescu	Romania	7:35.74
11	Hugo Waser; Adolf Waser	Werner Ehrensperger	Switzerland	7:36.03
12	Natalio Rossi; Juan Pedro Lier	Oscar Rompani	Argentina	DNS

==== Final A ====
Rank	Rowers	Coxswain	Nation	Time
1st place, gold medalist(s)	Ed Ferry; Conn Findlay	Kent Mitchell	United States	8:21.33
2nd place, silver medalist(s)	Jacques Morel; Georges Morel	Jean-Claude Darouy	France	8:23.15
3rd place, bronze medalist(s)	Herman Rouwé; Erik Hartsuiker	Jan-Just Bos	Netherlands	8:23.42
4	Nikolay Safronov; Leonid Rakovshchik	Igor Rudakov	Soviet Union	8:24.85
5	Václav Chalupa Sr. Jiří Palko	Zdeněk Mejstřík	Czechoslovakia	8:36.21
6	Kazimierz Naskręcki; Marian Siejkowski	Stanisław Kozera	Poland	8:40.00

== Sources ==
- Tokyo Organizing Committee (1964). The Games of the XVIII Olympiad: Tokyo 1964, vol. 2.
