= Hamada (name) =

Hamada is both a Japanese surname and a given name, as well as a common Arabic first name popular mostly in Egypt. Notable people with the name include:

== People with the surname ==
- Asahi Hamada (born 2001), Japanese Kpop idol
- Ayako Hamada (born 1981), Japanese-Mexican professional wrestler, daughter of Gran Hamada
- Gaku Hamada (濱田 岳; born 1988), Japanese film and television actor
- Gran Hamada (グラン 浜田; 1950–2025), Japanese professional wrestler
- Haruna Hamada (濱田 春菜; born 1980), birth name of Halna, Japanese singer
- Hatsuyuki Hamada (濱田 初幸; born 1955), retired Japanese judoka
- Junichi Hamada (濱田 純一; born 1950), the 29th President of the University of Tokyo
- Hamada Kagetaka (浜田 景隆; 1554–1591), samurai retainer to the Date clan
- Kichijiro Hamada (浜田 吉次郎; born 1942), Japanese boxer
- Koichi Hamada (economist) (浜田 宏一; born 1936), Japanese economist
- Kōichi Hamada (浜田 幸一; 1928–2012), Japanese politician
- Kōsaku Hamada (濱田 耕作) or Seiryō Hamada (濱田 青陵) (1881–1938), Japanese academic, archaeologist, author and former President of Kyoto University
- Kunio Hamada (濱田 邦夫; born 1936), former member of the Supreme Court of Japan from 2001 until 2006
- Mari Hamada (浜田 麻里; born 1962), Japanese female rock singer, songwriter and producer.
- Mari Hamada (濱田マリ; born 1968), Japanese singer and actress
- Masatoshi Hamada (浜田 雅功; born 1963), Japanese television host and comedian
- Masayoshi Hamada (浜田 昌良; born 1957), Japanese politician
- Mayu Hamada (濱田 真由; born 1994), female Japanese taekwondo practitioner
- Miho Hamada (濱田 美穂; born 1947), Japanese table tennis player
- Mizuki Hamada (born 1990), American-born Japanese football defender
- Robert Hamada (professor) (born 1937), professor of finance at University of Chicago
- Robert Hamada (woodworker) (born 20th century), Hawaiian woodturner
- Satoshi Hamada (浜田 聡; born 1977), Japanese politician
- Seiji Hamada (浜田 省司; born 1962), Japanese politician
- Shōgo Hamada (浜田 省吾; born 1952), Japanese singer-songwriter
- Shoji Hamada (濱田 庄司; 1894–1978), Japanese potter and Living National Treasure
- Shoko Hamada (disambiguation), multiple people
- Shori Hamada (濵田 尚里; born 1990), Japanese judoka
- Takeshi Hamada (濱田 武; born 1982), Japanese footballer
- Tatsuro Hamada (濱田 達郎; born 1994), professional Japanese baseball player
- Toshihiro Hamada (浜田 俊裕; born 1941), Japanese rower
- Xóchitl Hamada (born 1970), Japanese professional wrestler, daughter of Gran Hamada
- Yasukazu Hamada (浜田 靖一; born 1955), Japanese politician and member of the cabinet

=== Fictional characters ===
- Hiro Hamada, main protagonist from the movie Big Hero 6
- Tadashi Hamada, brother of the main protagonist from the movie Big Hero 6

== People with the given name ==
- Hamada Helal (born 1980), Egyptian singer
- Hamada Jambay (born 1975), French Malagasy football player
- Hamada Madi (born 1965), Secretary General of the Indian Ocean Commission, former Prime Minister of Comoros

== See also ==
- Mazen al-Hamada (1977–2024), Syrian activist
