= Werner Ehrensperger =

Swiss coxswain

Personal information
- Born: 10 March 1940 (age 86) Lucerne, Switzerland
- Height: 158 cm (5 ft 2 in)
- Weight: 50 kg (110 lb)

Sport
- Sport: Rowing
Medal record
Men's rowing
Representing Switzerland
European Rowing Championships
Bronze medal – third place	1957 Duisburg	Coxed four
Bronze medal – third place	1958 Poznań	Coxed pair

Werner Ehrensperger (born 10 March 1940) is a Swiss coxswain.

Ehrensperger was born in 1940 in Lucerne, Switzerland.

At the 1957 European Rowing Championships in Duisburg, Ehrensperger won a bronze medal in the coxed four event. At the 1958 European Rowing Championships in Poznań, Ehrensperger won a bronze medal in the coxed pair event with Gottfried Kottmann and Rolf Streuli. He competed at the 1960 Summer Olympics in Rome with the men's eight where they were eliminated in the round one repechage. He competed at the 1964 Summer Olympics in Tokyo with the coxed pair with Hugo and Adolf Waser, and they came eleventh.
