= Rakovshchik =

Rakovshchik is a surname. Notable people with the surname include:

- Leonid Rakovshchik (born 1938), Soviet rower
- Tatyana Rakovshchik (born 1941), Soviet rower
