= Kagetaka =

- Gender: Male

Origin
- Origin: Japanese
- Meaning: Different meanings depending on the kanji used

Kagetaka (written: 景隆) is a masculine Japanese given name. Notable people with the name include:

- Hamada Kagetaka (浜田 景隆) (1554–1591), Japanese samurai
- Ohama Kagetaka (小浜 景隆) (1540–1597), Japanese pirate
- Yamaoka Kagetaka (山岡 景隆) (1526–1585), Japanese samurai
