= Mejstřík =

Mejstřík (feminine Mejstříková) is a Czech surname. Notable people with the surname include:

- Karl Mejstrik, Austrian pair skater
- Martin Mejstřík (born 1962), Czech politician and human rights activist
- Zdeněk Mejstřík, Czech rower
