= Robert Hamada =

Robert Hamada may refer to:

- Robert Hamada (professor) (born 1937), professor of finance and former dean of the University of Chicago Booth School of Business
- Robert Hamada (woodworker), self-taught woodturner on the island of Kauai in Hawaii
