= Günter Bergau =

German rower

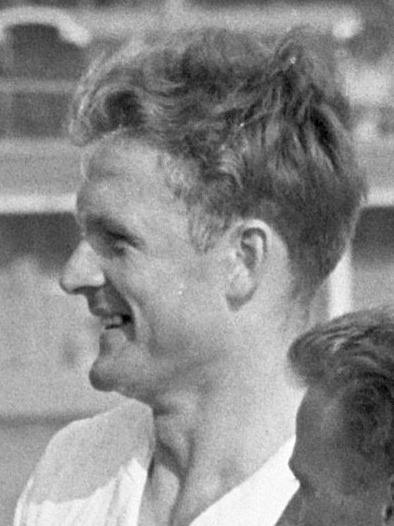
- Günter Bergau at the 1964 European Championships

Personal information
- Born: 11 April 1939 (age 87) Pillau, Germany
- Height: 1.85 m (6 ft 1 in)
- Weight: 87 kg (192 lb)

Sport
- Sport: Rowing
- Club: ASK Vorwärts Rostock
Medal record
Representing East Germany
European Rowing Championships
Gold medal – first place	1964 Amsterdam	Coxed pair
Silver medal – second place	1967 Vichy	Coxless pair

Günter Bergau (born 11 April 1939) is a retired German rower. He competed for the United Team of Germany at the 1964 Summer Olympics in the coxed pairs and for East Germany at the 1968 Summer Olympics in eights and finished in seventh place in both events. Bergau won a gold and a silver medal at the European championships in 1964 and 1967. In the doubles his rowing partner was Peter Gorny, whereas his coxswain in all events was Karl-Heinz Danielowski.
