= Yamaoka =

Yamaoka is a Japanese surname. Notable people with the surname include:

- Akira Yamaoka (山岡 晃) (born 1968), Japanese video game composer (Silent Hill series)
- Kristi Yamaoka (born 1987), American cheerleader discussed in Cheerleading#Dangers of cheerleading
- Kenji Yamaoka (山岡 賢次) (born 1943), Japanese politician of the Democratic Party of Japan
- Taisuke Yamaoka (山岡 泰輔), Japanese professional baseball player
- Yamaoka Kagetaka (山岡 景隆) (1526–1585), samurai
- Yamaoka Tesshū (山岡 鉄舟) (1836–1888), samurai

Fictional characters:

- Hajime Yamaoka, a character from Ultraman Nexus
- Shirō Yamaoka, protagonist of the manga series Oishinbo
- Rin Yamaoka, a playable character in the video game Dead by Daylight
- Kazan Yamaoka, a playable character in the video game Dead by Daylight

== See also ==
- Yamaoka Station, train station in Ena, Gifu Prefecture, Japan
- Yamaoka, Gifu, former town in Ena, Gifu Prefecture, Japan
