= Halwani =

Halwani and the variant Halawani sometimes with the definite article -al and -el may refer to:

== Halwani ==
- Amr El Halwani (born 1985), Egyptian footballer
- Yazan Halwani, Lebanese artist and graffiti artist
- Raja Halwani (born 1967), American-Lebanese philosopher

== Halawani ==
- Ayman Halawani, now known as Richard Halawani, American entrepreneur and film producer
- Mohamed El-Halawani (born 1936), Egyptian rower
- Rula Halawani (born 1964), Palestinian photographer and educator
