= Hamadeh =

Hamadeh (Arabic: حمادة), also spelled Hamadé, Hammadeh, or Hamada, is a common Arabic surname.

- Ali Hamadeh (born 1974), American tennis player of Lebanese origin
- Anas Hamadeh (born 1989), Jordanian swimmer
- Abraham Hamadeh (born 1991), American politician and prosecutor
- Fadi Hammadeh (born 1972), alternatively Fadi Hamadeh, Syrian auto-cross driver
- Hassan Hamada (born 1968), also spelled Hassan al-Hamadeh, former Colonel in the Syrian Air Force who defected to Jordan with his military airplane
- Marwan Hamadeh or Hamadé (born 1939), Lebanese politician, MP and minister, journalist
- Sabri Hamadeh or Hamadé (1902–1976), alternatively Sabri Hamadé, Lebanese politician and long-time Speaker of the Lebanese Parliament
- Sam Hamadeh, American media entrepreneur with business interests in digital media, publishing, and film
- Trad Hamadeh, Lebanese politician and minister

== See also ==
- Hamada (disambiguation)
- Hamada (name)
