= Hamada (disambiguation) =

A hamada is a type of desert landscape.

Hamada or hammada (or Japanese 浜田) may also refer to:

== Places ==
- Hamada, Shimane, a city in Shimane Prefecture, Japan
- Rikuzen-Hamada Station, a rail station in Shiogama, Miyagi, Japan

== Other uses ==
- Hamada (name), list of people with the surname and given name
- Hammada (plant), a genus in the family Amaranthaceae
- Taraka hamada, a species of Indian butterfly
- Hamada Type pistol, a sidearm produced by Japan during World War II.
- Hamada, a 2009 album by Nils Petter Molvær

== See also ==
- Hamadeh (disambiguation)
