= Toshihiro =

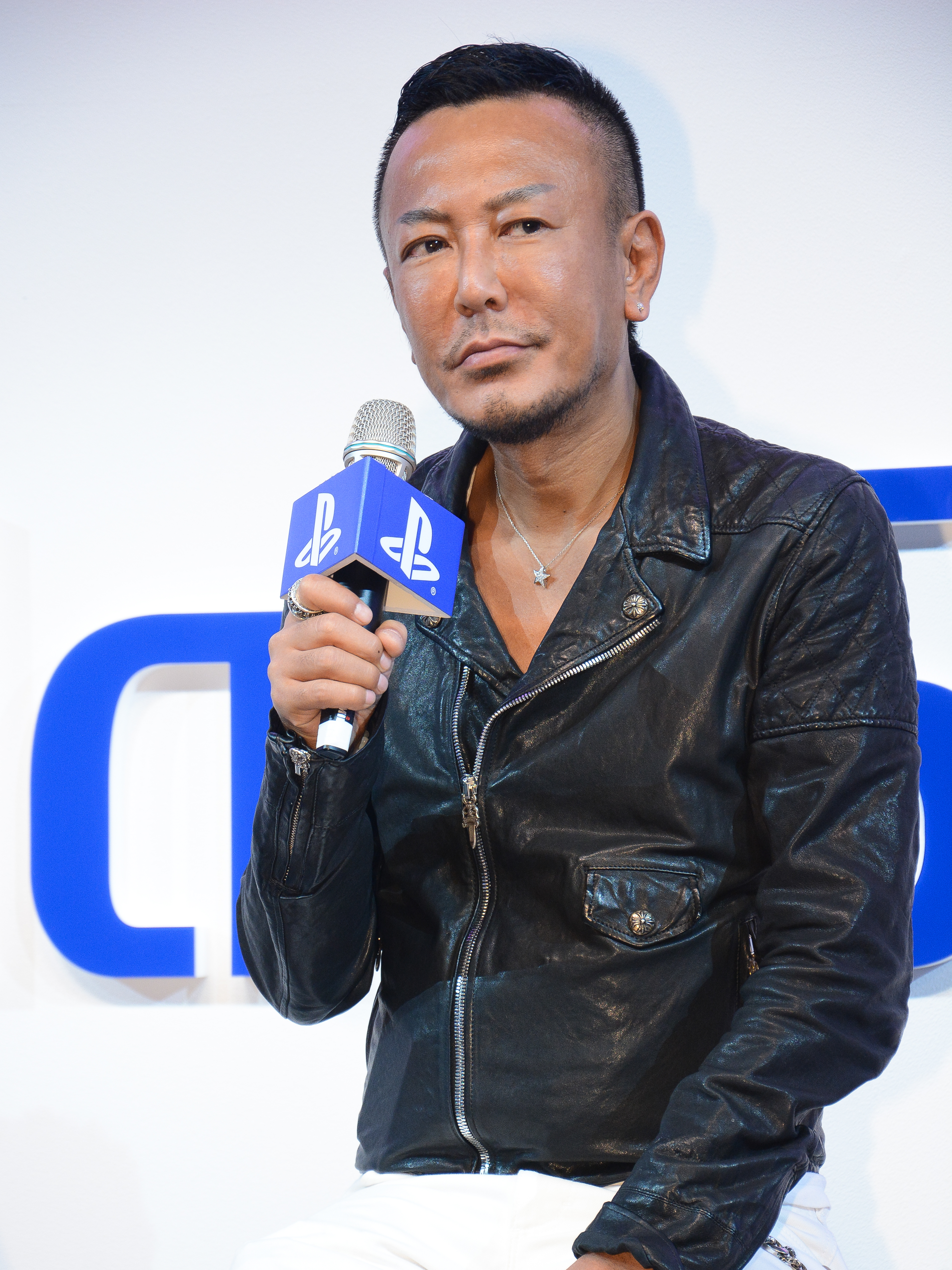
- Toshihiro Nagoshi. Japanese video game designer and producer.
- Pronunciation: toɕiçiɾo (IPA)
- Gender: Male

Origin
- Origin: Japanese
- Meaning: Different meanings depending on the kanji used

Other names
- Alternative spelling: Tosihiro (Kunrei-shiki) Tosihiro (Nihon-shiki) Toshihiro (Hepburn)

Toshihiro is a masculine Japanese given name.

== Written forms ==
Toshihiro can be written using different combinations of kanji characters. Some examples:

- 敏弘, "agile, vast"
- 敏宏, "agile, wide"
- 敏浩, "agile, wide"
- 敏博, "agile, doctor"
- 敏広, "agile, wide"
- 敏洋, "agile, ocean"
- 敏裕, "agile, abundant"
- 俊弘, "talented, vast"
- 俊裕, "talented, abundant"
- 俊博, "talented, doctor"
- 俊大, "talented, big"
- 寿広, "long life, wide"
- 寿弘, "long life, vast"
- 利弘, "benefit, vast"
- 年弘, "year, vast"

The name can also be written in hiragana としひろ or katakana トシヒロ.

== Notable people with the name ==
- Toshihiro Aoyama (青山 敏弘; born 1986), Japanese footballer
- Toshihiro Hamada (浜田 俊裕; born 1941), Japanese rower
- Toshihiro Hanada (花田 敏博; born 1960), Japanese Nordic combined skier
- Toshihiro Hattori (服部 年宏; born 1973), Japanese footballer
- Toshihiro Horikawa (堀河 俊大; born 1989), Japanese footballer
- Toshihiro Kaiwa (海和 俊宏; born 1955), Japanese alpine skier
- Toshihiro Kaneishi (金石 年弘; born 1978), Japanese racing driver
- Toshihiro Kawamoto (川元 利浩; born 1963), Japanese animator
- Toshihiro Matsushita (松下 年宏; born 1983), Japanese footballer
- Toshihiro Nagoshi (名越 稔洋; born 1965), Japanese video game designer and producer
- Toshihiro Nikai (二階 俊博; born 1939), Japanese politician
- Toshihiro Ono (小野 敏洋; born 1965), Japanese manga artist
- Toshihiro Oshiro (大城 利弘; born 1949), Japanese karateka
- Toshihiro Shibutani (渋谷 俊浩; born 1962), Japanese long-distance runner
- Toshihiro Shimamura (島村 俊廣; 1912–1991), Japanese Go player
- Toshihiro Takada (高田 稔浩), Japanese Paralympic athlete
- Toshihiro Takami (高見 敏弘), Japanese philanthropist
- Toshihiro Uchida (内田 利広; born 1972), Japanese footballer
- Toshihiro Yamaguchi (山口 敏弘; born 1971), Japanese footballer
- Toshihiro Yoshimura (吉村 寿洋; born 1971), Japanese footballer
