= Niels Olsen (disambiguation) =

Niels Olsen (born 1960) is a Danish actor.

Niels Olsen is also the name of:

- Niels "Noller" Olsen (born 1954), of the Olsen Brothers
- Niels Olsen (rowing) (born 1948), Danish rower
- Niels Olsen Peet (born 1988), Ecuadorian politician
