= Oscar Rompani =

Argentine rower

Personal information
- Full name: Oscar Carlos Alberto Rompani
- Nationality: Argentine
- Born: 6 August 1904
- Died: 17 March 1974 (aged 69)

Sport
- Sport: Rowing

Oscar Carlos Alberto Rompani (6 August 1904 – 17 March 1974) was an Argentine rower. He competed in the men's coxed pair event at the 1964 Summer Olympics as a coxswain. At the age of 60, he is the oldest rower to have competed in the Olympics.
