= Erik Hartsuiker =

Dutch rower (1940–2019)

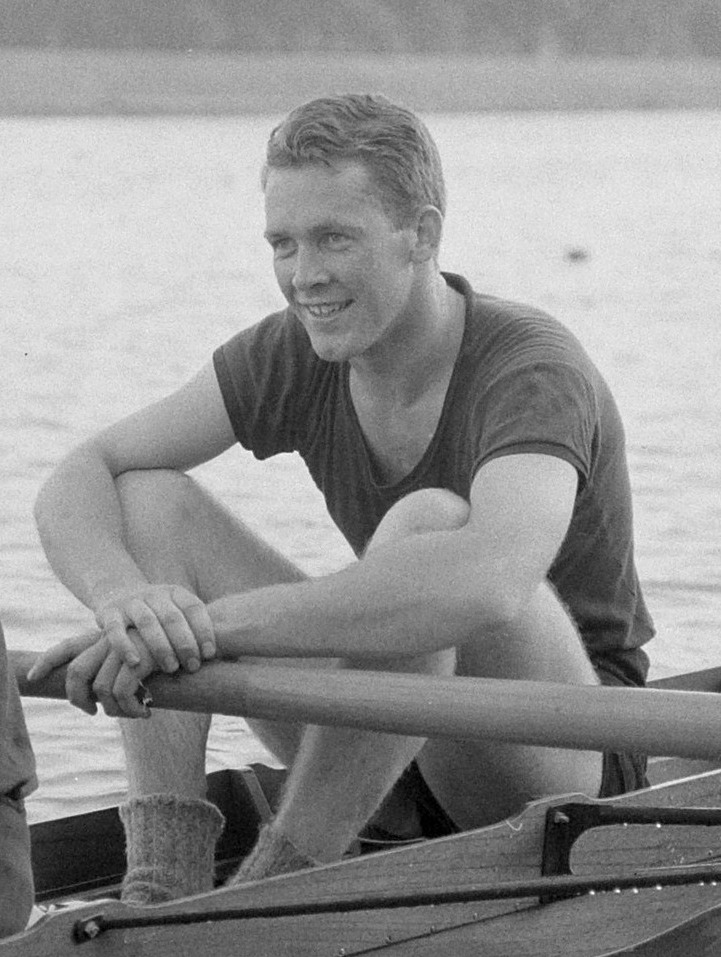

Personal information
- Born: 19 October 1940 Avereest, the Netherlands
- Died: 13 January 2019 (aged 78)
- Height: 1.89 m (6 ft 2 in)
- Weight: 84 kg (185 lb)

Sport
- Sport: Rowing
- Club: Triton, Utrecht
Medal record
Olympic Games
| Bronze medal – third place | 1964 Tokyo | Coxed pair |

Frederik Klaas Jan "Erik" Hartsuiker (19 October 1940 – 13 January 2019) was a Dutch rower who competed at the 1964 and 1968 Summer Olympics. In 1964, he won a bronze medal in the coxed pairs event, together with Herman Rouwé and Jan-Just Bos. Four years later, he finished ninth in the coxed fours competition.
