= Jiří Palko =

Czech rower

Personal information
- Nationality: Czech
- Born: 17 March 1941; Prague, Czechoslovakia
- Died: 2 February 2014 (aged 72)

Sport
- Sport: Rowing

Jiří Palko (17 March 1941 – 2 February 2014) was a Czech rower. He competed in the men's coxed pair event at the 1964 Summer Olympics.
