= Meike de Vlas =

Dutch rower (1942–2022)

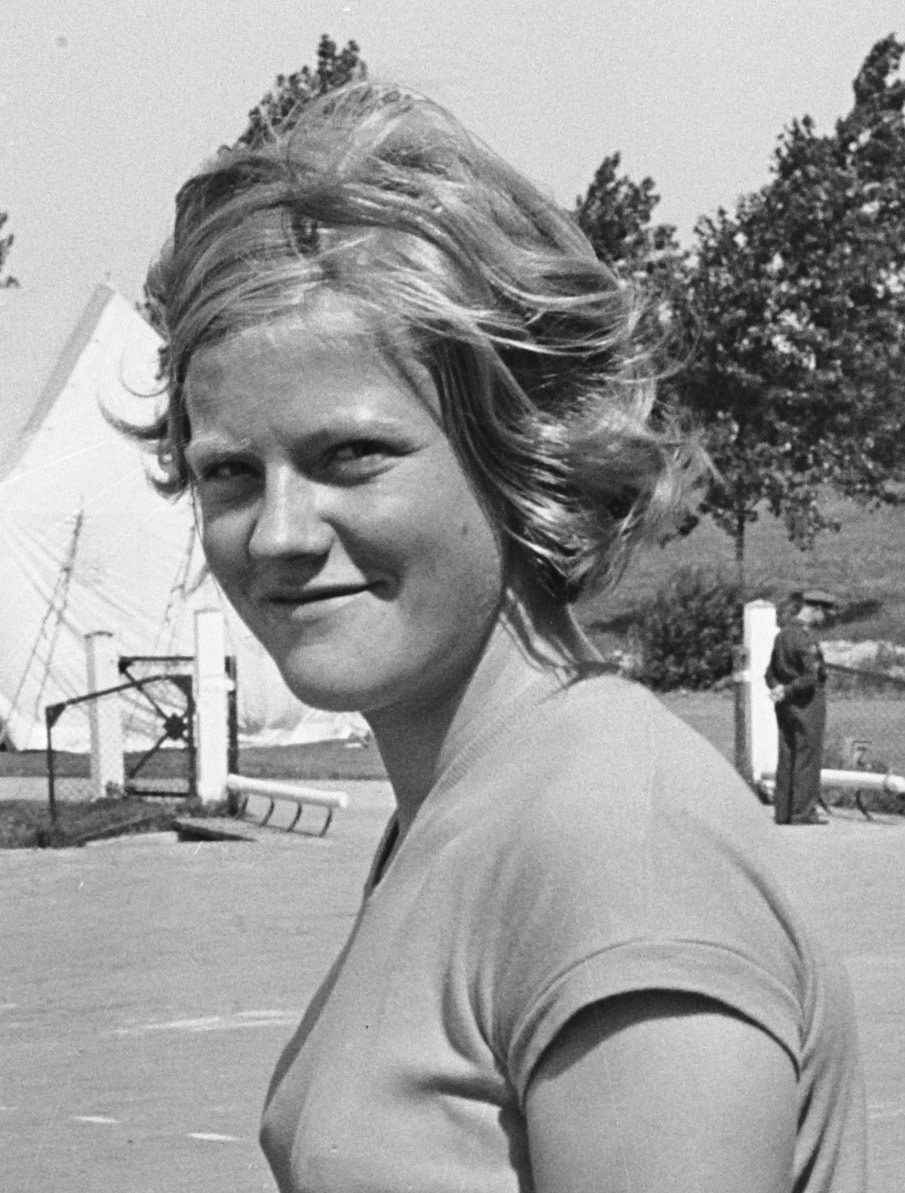
- De Vlas in 1964

Personal information
- Born: 5 September 1942 Ameland, German-occupied Netherlands
- Died: 8 October 2022 (aged 80) Oslo, Norway
- Spouse: Hadriaan van Nes

Sport
- Sport: Rowing
Medal record
Representing the Netherlands
European Rowing Championships
Silver medal – second place	1964 Amsterdam	Single sculls

Geertruida Akke (Meike) de Vlas (5 September 1942 – 8 October 2022) was a Dutch rower who won a silver medal in the single sculls at the European Championships in 1964. Her husband Hadriaan van Nes and daughter Eeke van Nes (born 1969) are Olympic medalists in rowing.

De Vlas was born on Ameland on 6 September 1942. She died of cancer on 8 October 2022, at the age of 80.
