= Jan-Just Bos =

Dutch botanist and rower

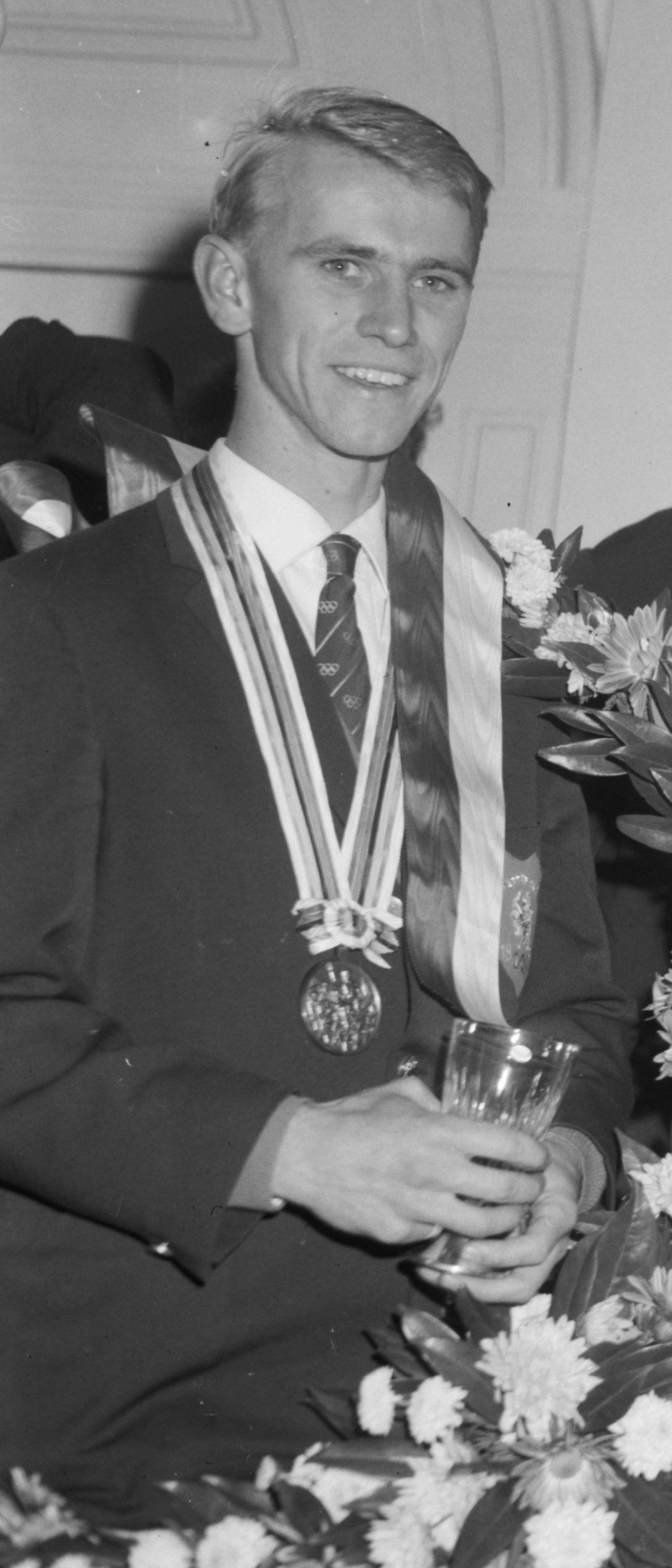
- Bos (1964)

Personal information
- Born: Jan Justus Bos; 28 July 1939 Balikpapan, Dutch East Indies
- Died: 24 March 2003 (aged 63) Oosterbeek, the Netherlands
- Education: Wageningen University
- Height: 1.68 m (5 ft 6 in)
- Weight: 49 kg (108 lb)

Sport
- Sport: Rowing
- Club: Argo, Wageningen
Medal record
Men's rowing
Representing the Netherlands
Olympic Games
Bronze medal – third place	1964 Tokyo	Coxed pair

Jan Justus "Jan-Just" Bos (28 July 1939 – 24 March 2003) was a Dutch botanist, television presenter, and rower who competed in the 1960 and 1964 Summer Olympics.

Bos (Dutch for "forest") studied forestry at the Wageningen University. While a student in Wageningen, he was the coxwain of the Dutch coxed pair, which was eliminated in the repechage at the 1960 Olympics. Four years later he won a bronze medal in the same event, together with Erik Hartsuiker and Herman Rouwé.

From 1968 on he worked at his Wageningen University, becoming a faculty member of the department of plant systematics. He specialized in the flora of Sub-Saharan Africa and spent six years in South Africa, Liberia, Cameroon, and Ethiopia where he collected over 10,000 plants. In 1984 he defended a PhD on a study of the plants of the genus Dracaena in West Africa. In 1985 he led an expedition to Gabon.

In the 1980s he was a presenter for the Dutch nature television series Ja, natuurlijk ("Yes, naturally").
