= Katsuhiko Ihara =

Japanese rower (born 1943)

Personal information
- Nationality: Japanese
- Born: 13 January 1943 (age 82)

Sport
- Sport: Rowing

Katsuhiko Ihara (井原 勝彦, Ihara Katsuhiko, born 13 January 1943) is a Japanese rower. He competed in the men's coxed pair event at the 1964 Summer Olympics.
