= Igor Rudakov =

Soviet rowing cox (1934–2008)

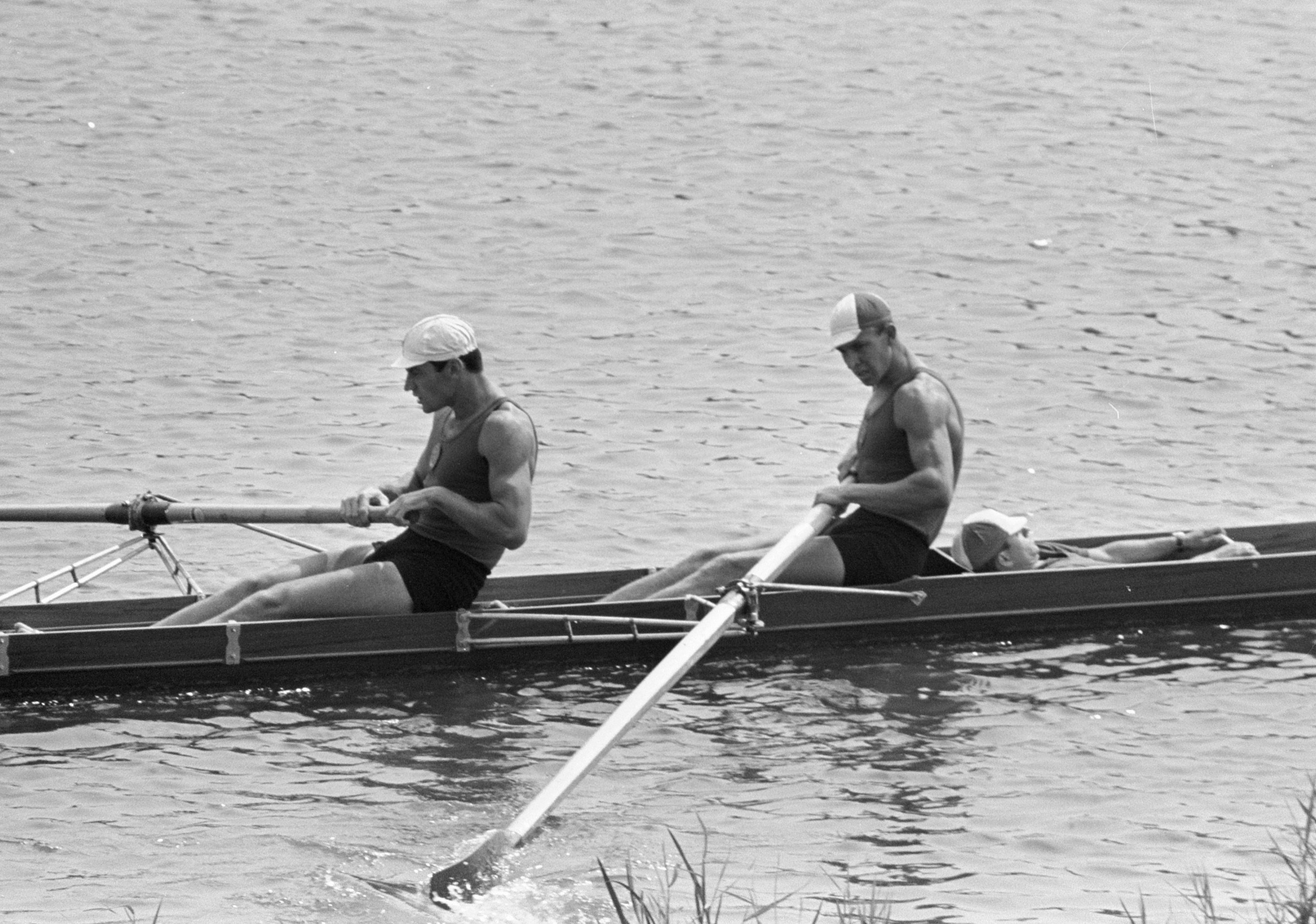
- Rudakov (lying down) with Leonid Rakovshchik (left) and Nikolay Safronov in 1964

Personal information
- Born: 8 October 1934 Leningrad, Soviet Union
- Died: 17 January 2008 (aged 73)

Sport
- Sport: Rowing
- Club: Trud Leningrad
Medal record
Men's rowing
Representing the Soviet Union
Olympic Games
Silver medal – second place	1960 Rome	Coxed pair
World Rowing Championships
Silver medal – second place	1974 Lucerne	Coxed four
Silver medal – second place	1975 Nottingham	Eight
Bronze medal – third place	1962 Lucerne	Coxed pair
Bronze medal – third place	1962 Lucerne	Coxed four
European Rowing Championships
Gold medal – first place	1965 Duisburg	Coxed pair
Silver medal – second place	1961 Prague	Coxed four
Silver medal – second place	1964 Amsterdam	Coxed pair
Silver medal – second place	1969 Klagenfurt	Eight
Bronze medal – third place	1963 Copenhagen	Coxed four
Bronze medal – third place	1971 Copenhagen	Coxed four

Igor Aleksandrovich Rudakov (Russian: Игорь Александрович Рудаков; 8 October 1934 – 17 January 2008) was a Russian coxswain who competed for the Soviet Union in the 1960, 1964, 1968, and in the 1972 Summer Olympics.

== Biography ==
Rudakov was born in Leningrad. In 1960 he was the coxswain of the Soviet boat that won the silver medal in the coxed pair event. He was also the cox of the Soviet boat that finished fourth in the coxed four competition. Rudakov competed at the 1961 European Rowing Championships with the coxed four and won silver. At the inaugural 1962 World Rowing Championships in Lucerne, he won bronze with both the coxed pair and the coxed four. At the 1963 European Rowing Championships, he won bronze with the coxed four. At the 1964 European Rowing Championships, he won silver with the coxed pair. Later that year, he finished fourth with the Soviet boat at the coxed pair competition at the 1964 Summer Olympics. At the 1965 European Rowing Championships, he won silver with the coxed pair.

At the 1968 Summer Olympics, he helped the Soviet boat to qualify for the B final of the coxed pair event, but the team did not compete in their last race. At the 1969 European Rowing Championships, he won silver with the eight. At the 1971 European Rowing Championships, he won silver with the coxed four. His last Olympic appearance was at the 1972 Summer Olympics; he coxed the Soviet boat in the coxed four competition where the team finished fourth. At the 1974 World Rowing Championships, he won silver with the coxed four at age 40. At the 1975 World Rowing Championships, he won silver with the eight.

Rudakov died on 17 January 2008, at the age of 73.
