= Jean-Claude Darouy =

French rower

Personal information
- Born: 30 August 1944
- Died: 8 August 2006 (aged 61)

Sport
- Sport: Rowing
Medal record
Men's rowing
Silver medal – second place	1964 Tokyo	Coxed pair

Jean-Claude Darouy (30 August 1944 – 8 August 2006) was a French rower who competed in the 1964 Summer Olympics.

In 1964 he was the coxswain of the French boat which won the silver medal in the coxed pairs event. He also coxed the French boat in the coxed four competition when they finished fourth.
