= 1964 European Rowing Championships =

International rowing event

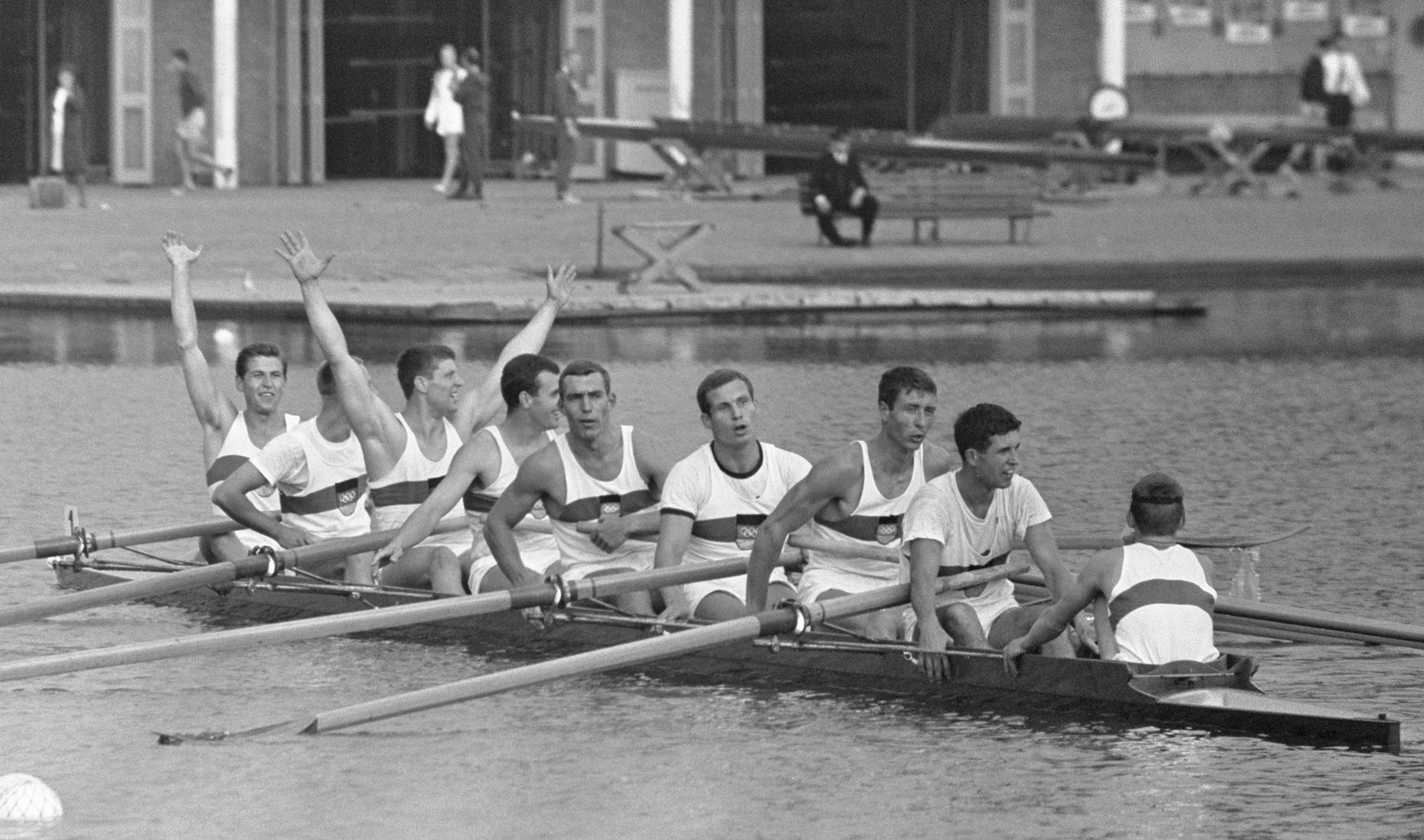
- The German eight of the Ratzeburg Rowing Club after winning the final
- Venue: Bosbaan
- Location: Amsterdam, Netherlands
- Dates: 31 July – 2 August 1964 (women); 6–9 August 1964 (men)

The 1964 European Rowing Championships were rowing championships held on the Bosbaan regatta course in the Dutch capital Amsterdam. Women competed from 31 July to 2 August. Men competed the following week from 6 to 9 August. Men competed in all seven Olympic boat classes (M1x, M2x, M2-, M2+, M4-, M4+, M8+), and women entered in five boat classes (W1x, W2x, W4x+, W4+, W8+). Many of the men competed two months later at the Olympic Games in Tokyo; women would first be allowed to compete at Olympic level in 1976.

== German participation ==
FISA, the International Rowing Federation, did not recognise East Germany as a country and insisted on one German team per boat class. The women, where East Germany was the dominant side, held their selection trials at the Olympic regatta course in Grünau in East Berlin on 24 and 25 July 1964. West Germany did not contest the coxed four and eight boat classes, and Karen Ulrich-Wolf won the single scull competition for the west as expected. East Germany won the competition in the remaining two boat classes – double scull and coxed quad scull.

The negotiations about the 1964 rowing competitions for men were even more protracted than usual as not only did a way forward for the 1964 European Rowing Championships had to be found, but rowing at the 1964 Summer Olympics two months later was also on the agenda. The negotiations were led by Willi Daume and Heinz Schöbel, presidents of the national Olympic committees of West and East Germany, respectively. In June 1964, West Germany insisted on one set of selection trials covering both the European and Olympic competitions. The tensions eased when it was agreed on 10 July that there would be separate selection trials for the two international competitions. It was agreed that some boat classes were to compete at a West German regatta course, and the remaining boat classes would meet at an East German venue. Four boats would start per race, with two for each country. The winning country would then be free to nominate rowers of their choice for that boat class, i.e. not necessarily those rowers who had won the race. Compared to the women, the situation was opposite, with West German rowers historically dominant; in 1963, they had won all boat classes.

The trials for coxed pairs, double sculls and coxless fours were held on 1 August at the Olympic rowing venue at Grünau in East Berlin, with East Germany winning the double scull race, and West Germany the other two classes. The following day, the remaining trials for single sculls, coxless pairs, coxed fours, and the eights were held in Duisburg. East Germany won in the single scull (Achim Hill) and the coxed pair classes; three qualifications compared to West Germany's four was the best East German result yet.

At a FISA meeting held in conjunction with the 1964 men's regatta, the East German rowing association asked for separate German teams to be allowed to compete in future. Like at the previous meeting in 1963, the motions was voted down.

== Medal summary – women's events ==
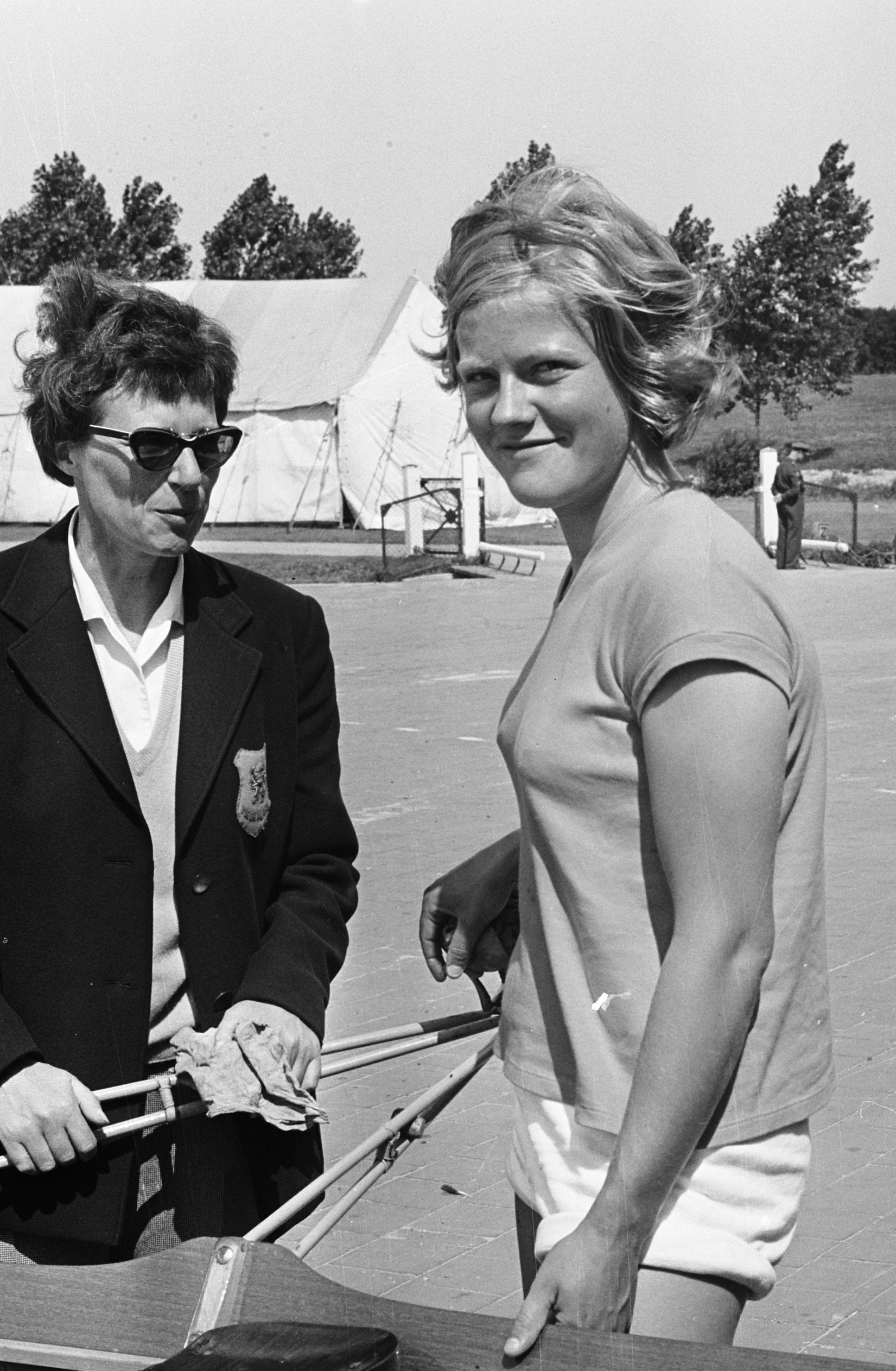
Meike de Vlas (silver medallist in single scull) with her trainer

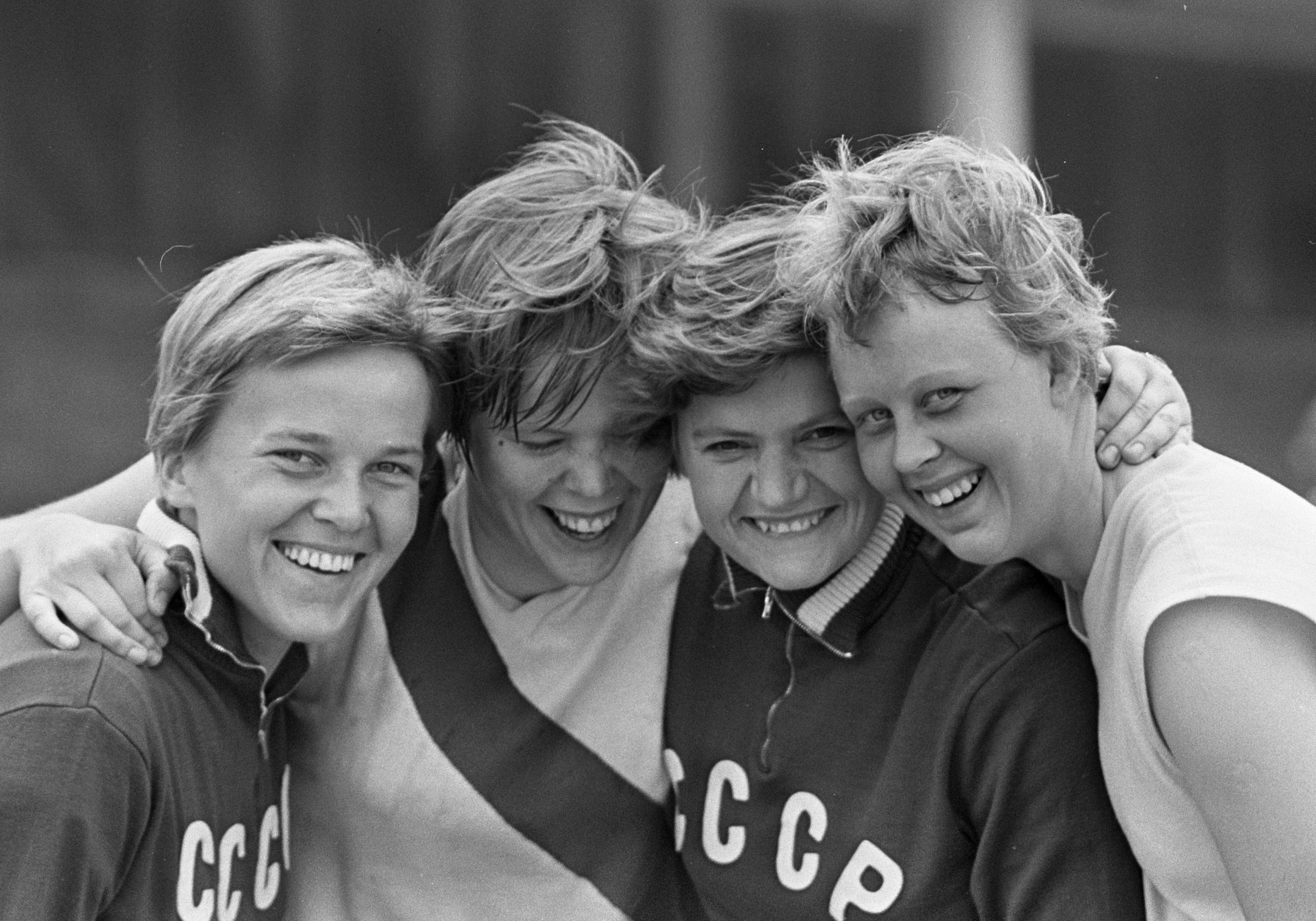
Maja Kaufmane-Pampura (left) and Daina Mallenberga (second from right) with two unidentified rowers

The Soviet Union was, once again, the most successful nation in the women's events, with three gold medals.

Event	Gold		Silver		Bronze	
Event	Country & rowers	Time	Country & rowers	Time	Country & rowers	Time
W1x	Soviet Union; Galina Konstantinova	3:44.70	Netherlands; Meike de Vlas	3:45.17	Czechoslovakia; Alena Postlová	3:47.06
W2x	Soviet Union; Maja Kaufmane-Pampura; Daina Mallenberga	3:32.43	Czechoslovakia; Alena Postlová; Magdalena Sarbochova	3:34.70	Hungary; Anna Domonkos; Maria Pekanovits	3:38.23
W4+	Soviet Union; Nina Shamanova; Ella Sergeyeva; Valentina Terekhova; Sanna Sumilovich; Valentina Timofeyeva (cox)	3:35.19	East Germany; Brigitte Amm; Erika Wunderlich; Gesine Jansen; Ingrid Fischer; Ursula Jurga (cox)	3:39.91	Romania; Iuliana Bulugioiu; Florica Ghiuzelea; Emilia Rigard; Ana Tamas; Stefania Borisov (cox)	3:40.20
W4x+	East Germany; Renate Boesler; Helga Kolbe; Antje Thiess; Hannelore Göttlich; Christa Böhm (cox)	3:22.11	Soviet Union; Aino Milodan; Nelli Chernova; Raissa Korotajewa; Vera Alexeyeva; Valentina Turkova (cox)	3:23.61	Netherlands; M.C. Bennink; M. van Beinum; A. Blom; R.D. de Kanter; D. Simons (cox)	3:28.54
W8+	East Germany; Barbara Müller; Ingrid Graf; Hilde Amelang; Christiane Münzberg; Irmgard Brendenal; Jutta Dietrich; Brigitte Rintisch; Marianne Mewes; Elfriede Dietz (cox)	3:10.63	Soviet Union; Alla Pervorukova; Irena Bačiulytė; Sofija Korkutytė; Leokadija Semashko; Aldona Klimavičiūtė; Mariona Pamauskaite; Stanislava Bubulytė; Genovaite Strigulaite; Valentina Timofeyeva (cox)	3:13.77	Romania; Iuliana Bulugioiu; Florica Ghiuzelea; Ana Tamas; Maria Trinks; Mariana Limpede; Viorica Moldovan; Emilia Rigard; Olimpia Mosneaga; Angela Paunescu (cox)	3:19.96

== Medal summary – men's events ==
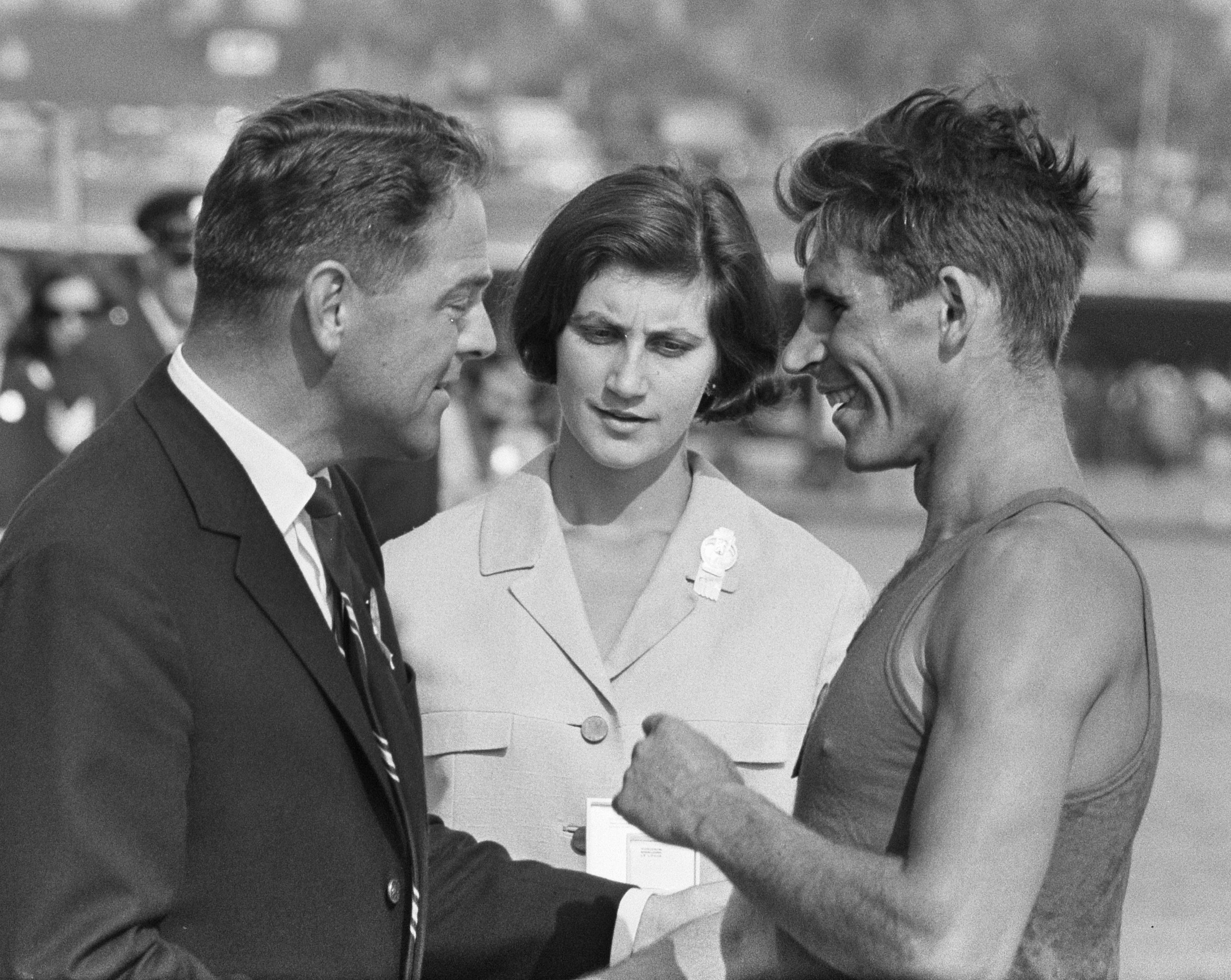
FISA president Thomas Keller congratulates Vyacheslav Ivanov for his single scull title

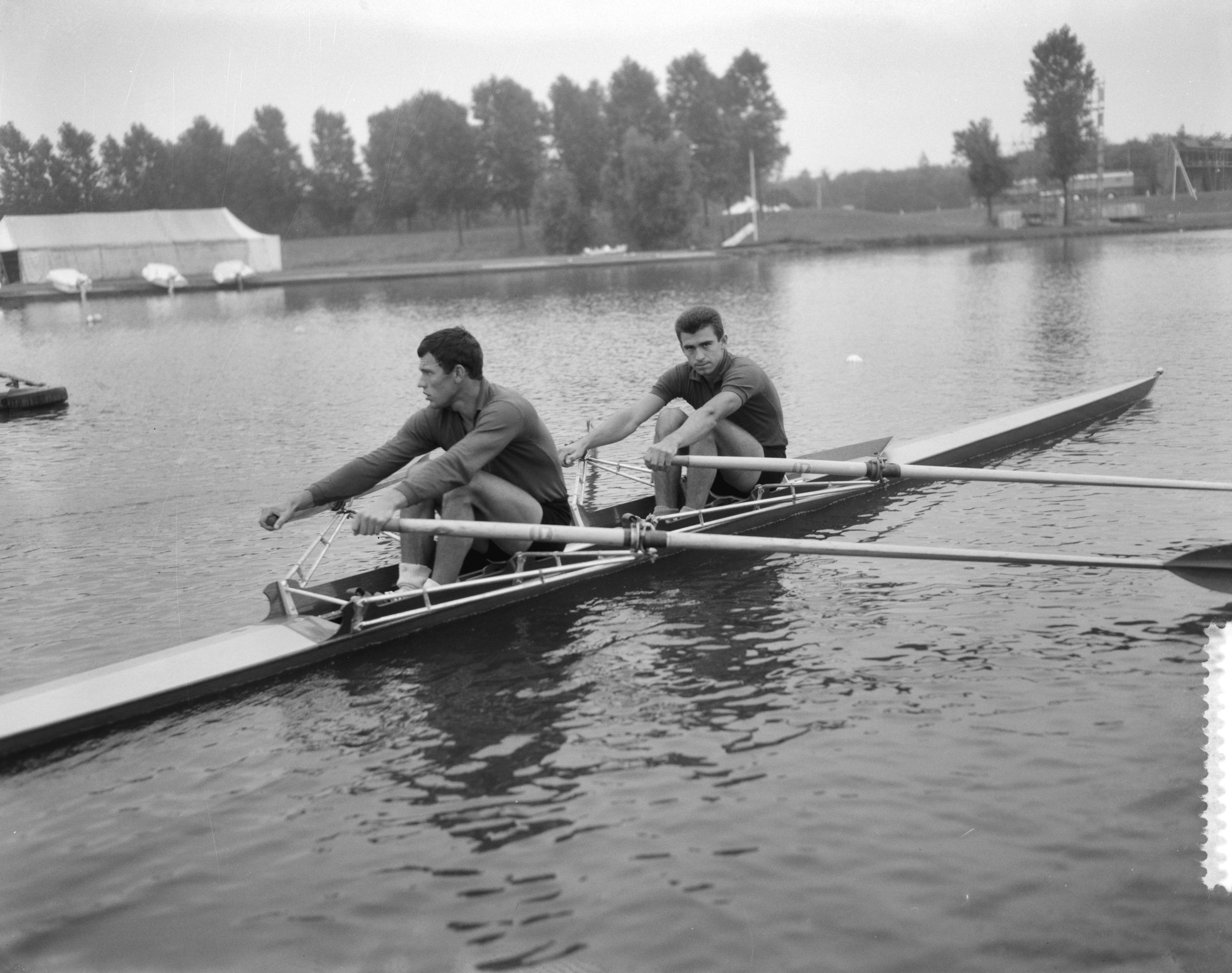
Oleg Tyurin and Boris Dubrovskiy – winner of the double scull competition

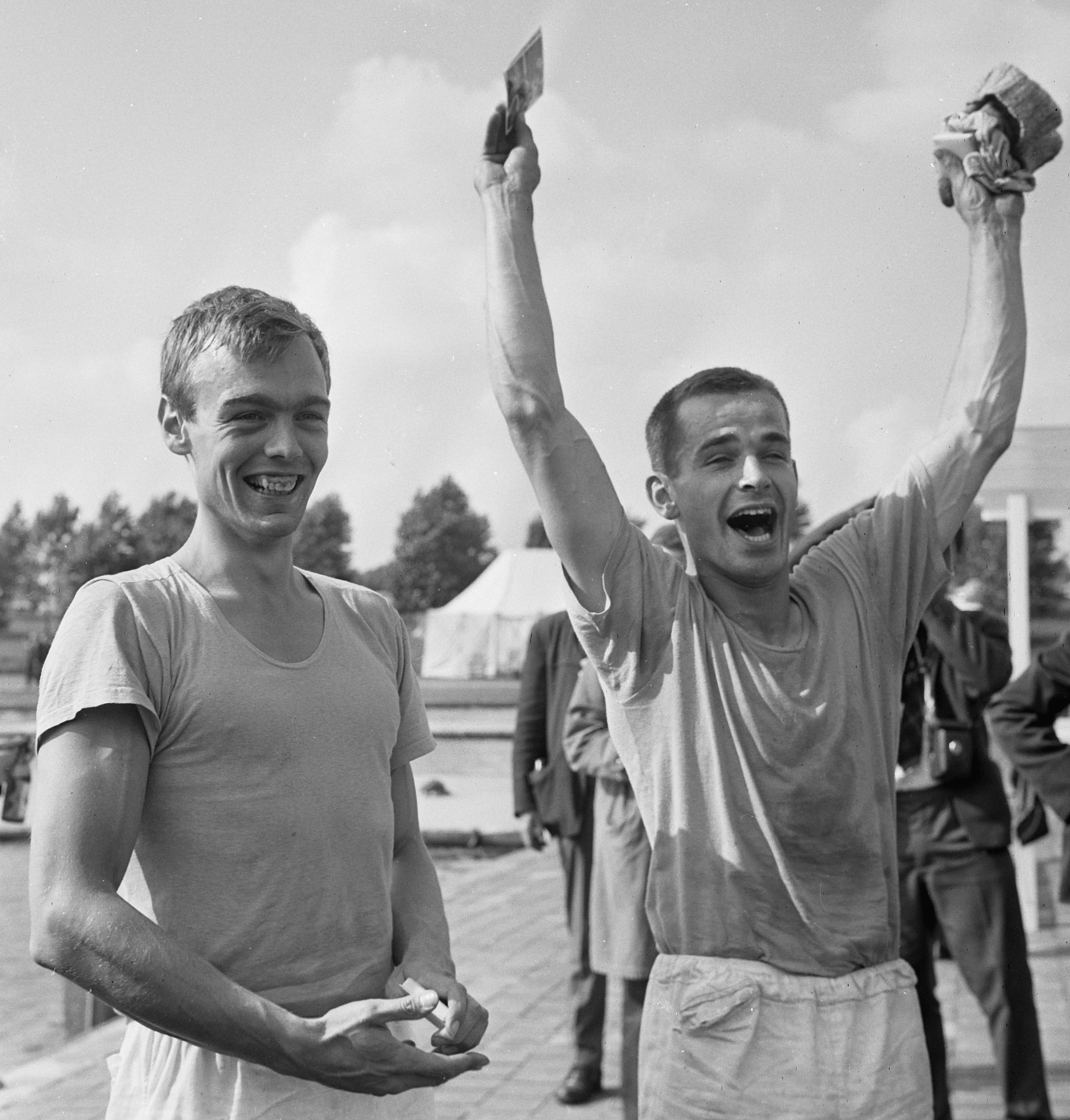
Ernst Veenemans and Steven Blaisse – winner of the coxless pair competition

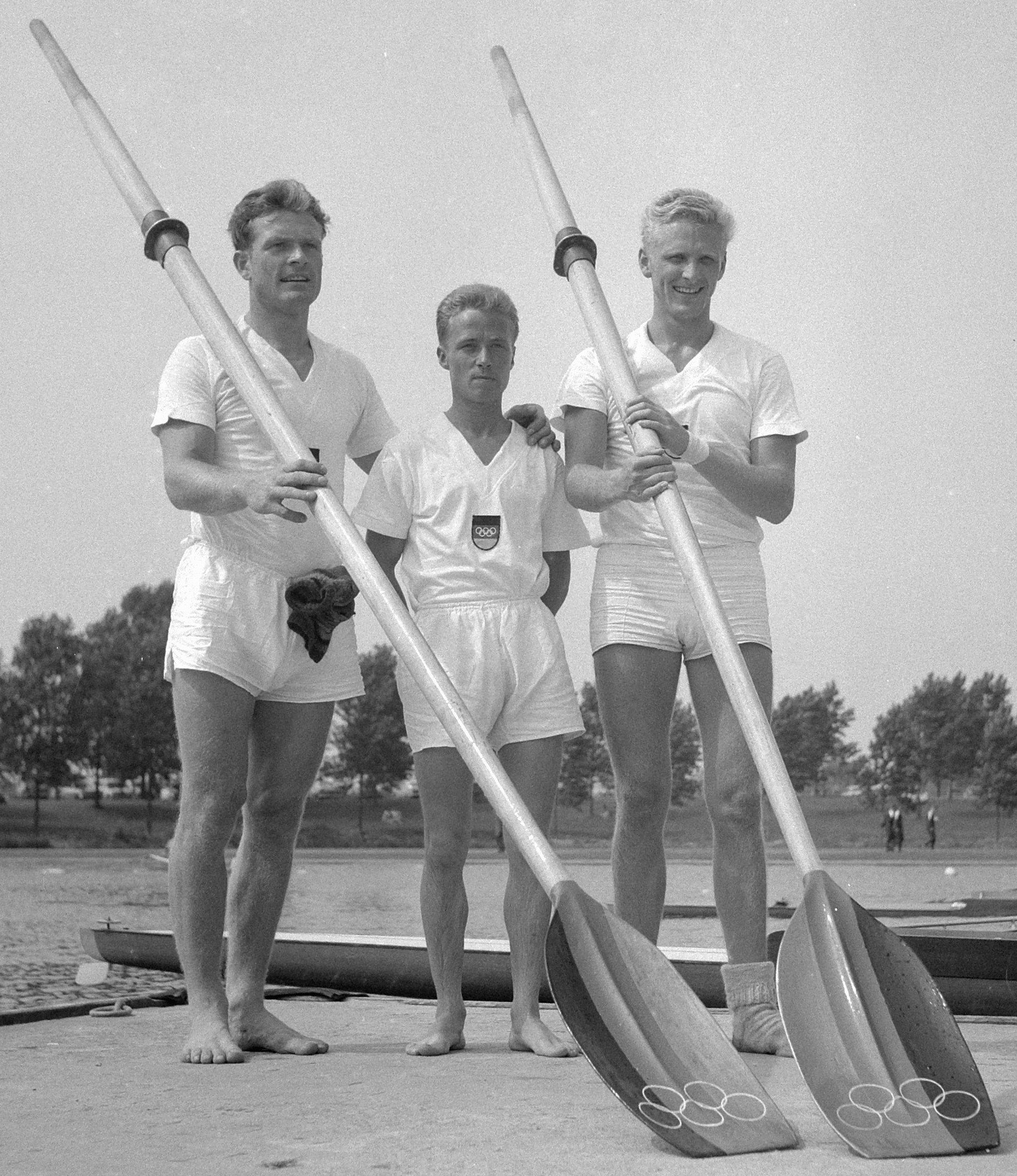
Günter Bergau, Karl-Heinz Danielowski, and Peter Gorny – winner of the coxed pair competition

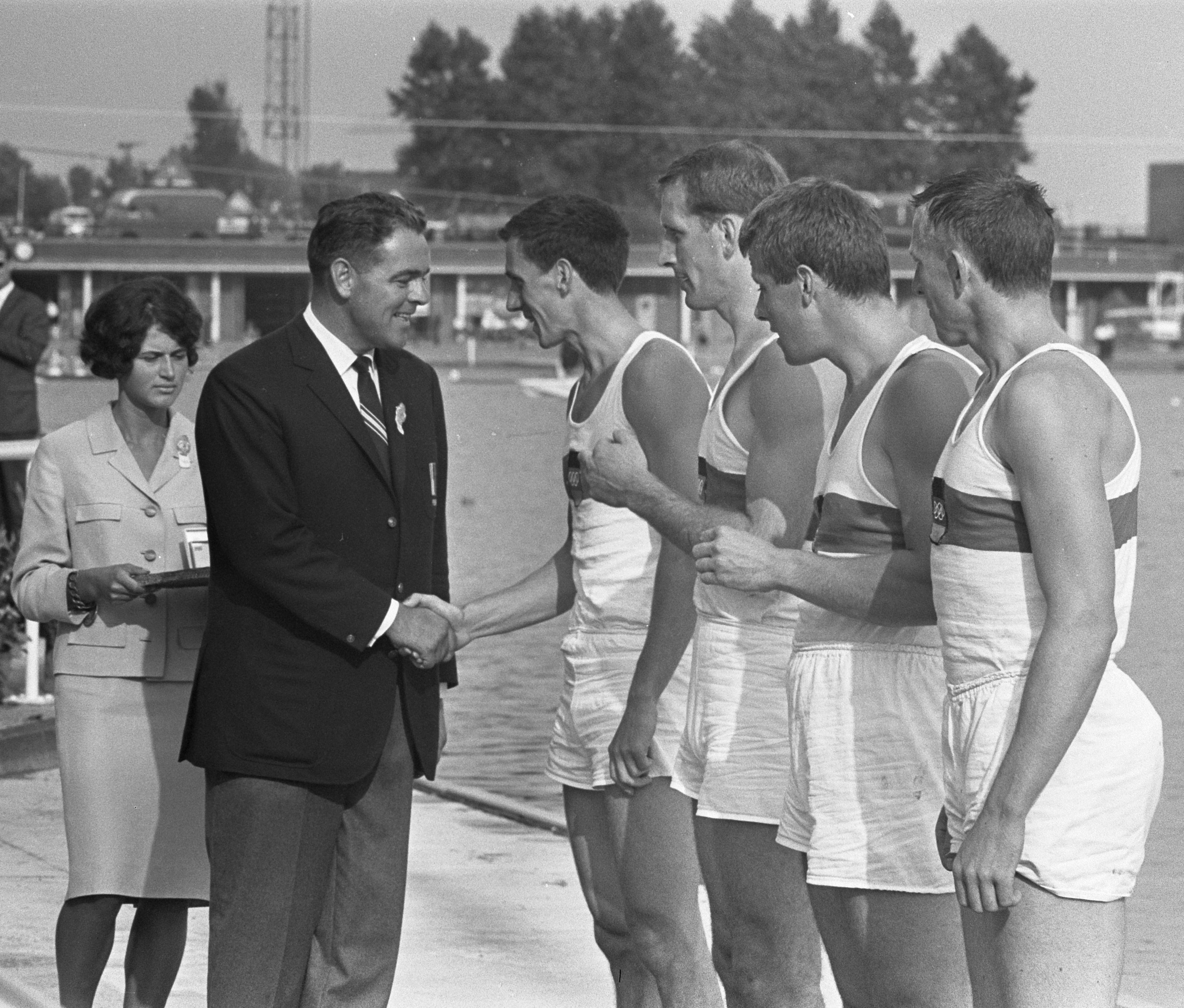
Thomas Keller congratulates Günter Schroers, Horst Effertz, Albrecht Müller, and Manfred Misselhorn – winner of the coxless four competition

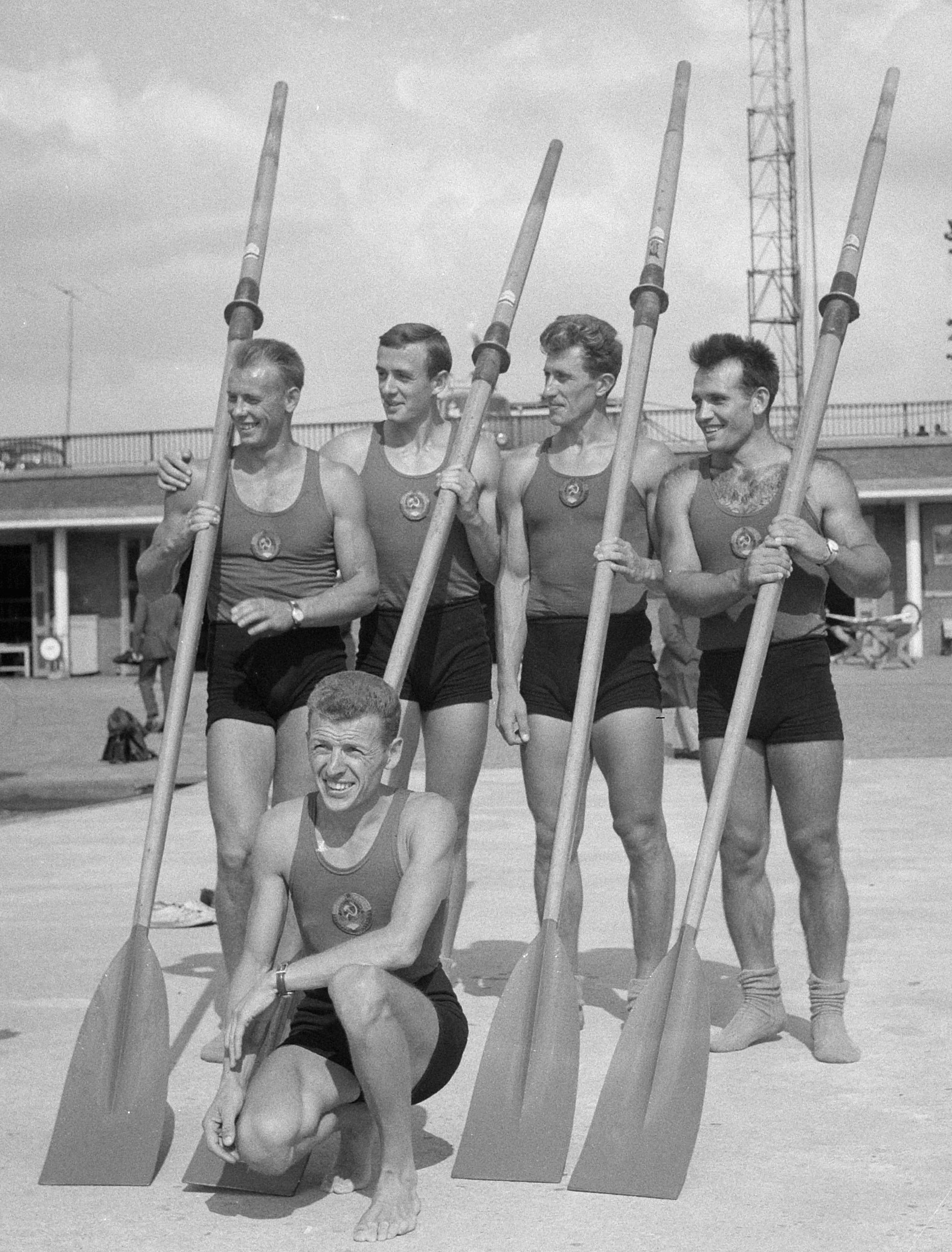
The Soviet coxed four

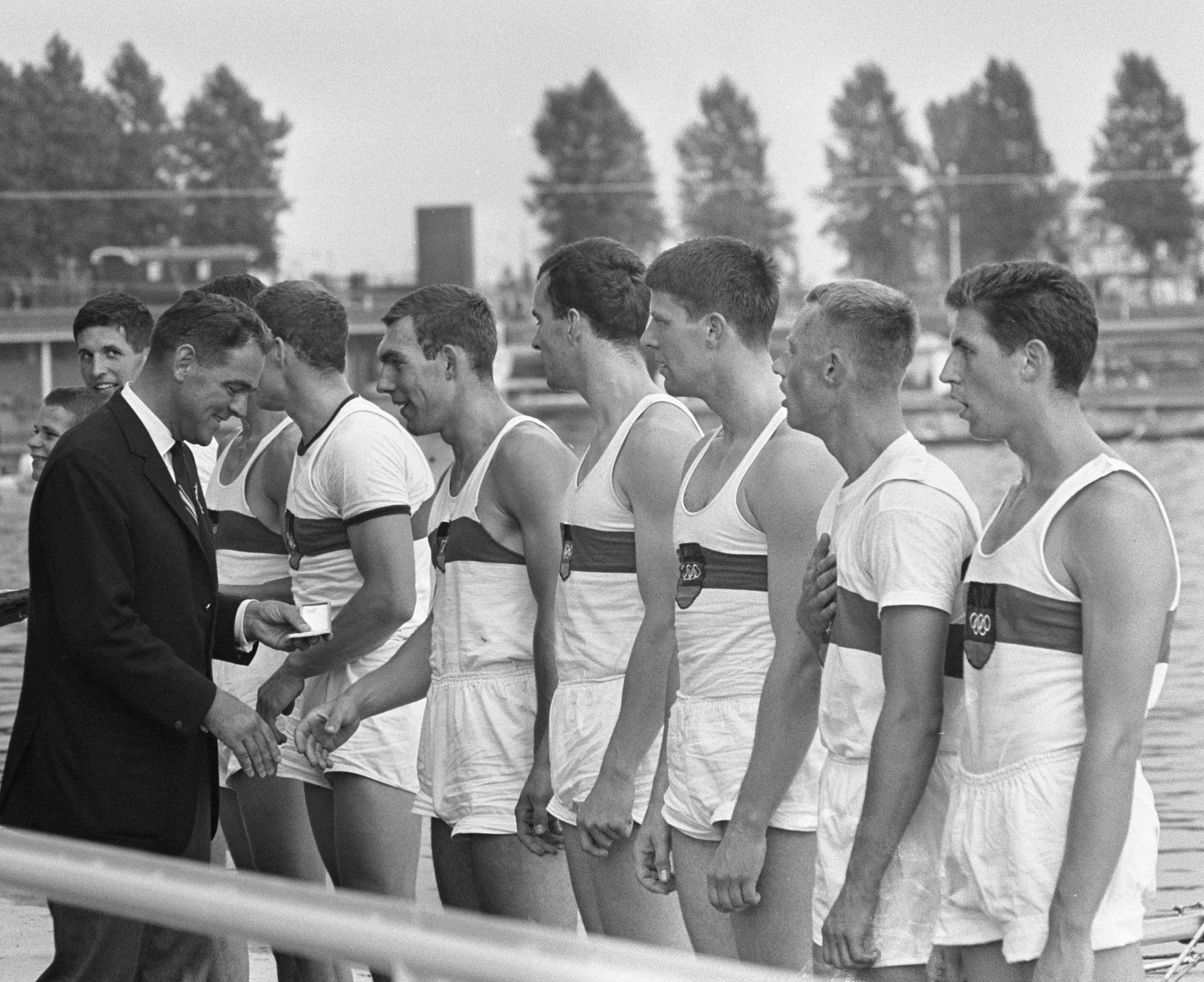
Thomas Keller congratulates the German eight

All finals were held on Sunday, 9 August. The Soviet Union had boats in all seven classes, followed by Holland (six classes). West Germany, Denmark and Poland had four boats each in the finals. In the single scull event, the rowers that placed outside the medals were Murray Watkinson (NZL; fourth), Eugeniusz Kubiak (POL; fifth), and Gottfried Kottmann (SUI; sixth). In the coxless pair, the American brothers Joseph and Thomas Amlong came fourth, while the Soviet rowers Oleg Golovanov and Valentin Boreyko came fifth.

Event	Gold		Silver		Bronze	
Event	Country & rowers	Time	Country & rowers	Time	Country & rowers	Time
M1x	Soviet Union; Vyacheslav Ivanov	7:05.19	Netherlands; Rob Groen	7:08.02	United States; Donald Spero	7:08.62
M2x	Soviet Union; Oleg Tyurin; Boris Dubrovskiy	6:28.90	Great Britain; Arnold Cooke; Peter Webb	6:30.88	Switzerland; Melchior Bürgin; Martin Studach	6:31.60
M2-	Netherlands; Ernst Veenemans; Steven Blaisse	6:42.55	West Germany; Michael Schwan; Wolfgang Hottenrott	6:46.46	Denmark; Peter Christiansen; Hans Jørgen Boye	6:49.15
M2+	East Germany; Peter Gorny; Günter Bergau; Karl-Heinz Danielowski (cox)	7:12.57	Soviet Union; Leonid Rakovshchik; Nikolay Safronov; Igor Rudakov (cox)	7:18.90	Poland; Kazimierz Naskręcki; Marian Siejkowski; Stanisław Kozera (cox)	7:20.89
M4-	West Germany; Manfred Misselhorn; Albrecht Müller; Horst Effertz; Günter Schroers	6:15.10	Denmark; John Hansen; Erik Petersen; Kurt Helmudt; Bjørn Hasløv	6:15.19	Italy; Romano Sgheiz; Fulvio Balatti; Giovanni Zucchi; Luciano Sgheiz	6:17.33
M4+	Soviet Union; Vladimir Yevseyev; Anatoly Tkachuk; Boris Kuzmin; Vitaly Kurdchenko; Anatoly Luzgin (cox)	6:14.41	West Germany; Peter Neusel; Bernhard Britting; Joachim Werner; Egbert Hirschfelder; Jürgen Oelke (cox)	6:19.61	Italy; Renato Bosatta; Emilio Trivini; Giuseppe Galante; Franco De Pedrina; Giovanni Spinola (cox)	6:19.97
M8+	West Germany; Klaus Aeffke; Klaus Bittner; Karl-Heinrich von Groddeck; Hans-Jürgen Wallbrecht; Klaus Behrens; Jürgen Schröder; Jürgen Plagemann; Horst Meyer; Thomas Ahrens (cox)	5:50.65	Soviet Union; Ričardas Vaitkevičius; Antanas Bagdonavičius; Zigmas Jukna; Yury Suslin; Volodymyr Sterlik; Vytautas Briedis; Petras Karla; Juozas Jagelavičius; Yuriy Lorentsson (cox)	5:50.67	Yugoslavia; Jadran Barut; Boris Klavora; Vekoslav Skalak; Jože Berc; Alojz Colja; Marko Mandič; Lucijan Kleva; Pavao Martić; Zdenko Balaš (cox)	5:58.85

== Medals table ==
The table shows the aggregate results for men and women with East and West Germany counted as separate countries. The overall winner was the Soviet Union with six gold medals, followed by East Germany and then West Germany with three and two gold medals, respectively.

Rank	Nation	Gold	Silver	Bronze	Total
1	Soviet Union (URS)	6	4	0	10
2	East Germany (GDR)	3	1	0	4
3	West Germany (FRG)	2	2	0	4
4	Netherlands (NED)	1	2	1	4
5	Czechoslovakia (TCH)	0	1	1	2
5	Denmark (DEN)	0	1	1	2
7	Great Britain (GBR)	0	1	0	1
8	Italy (ITA)	0	0	2	2
8	Romania (ROM)	0	0	2	2
10	Hungary (HUN)	0	0	1	1
10	Poland (POL)	0	0	1	1
10	Switzerland (SUI)	0	0	1	1
10	United States (USA)	0	0	1	1
10	Yugoslavia (YUG)	0	0	1	1
Totals (14 entries)		12	12	12	36
