= Peter Salzbacher =

Austrian rower

Personal information
- Nationality: Austrian
- Born: 29 May 1946 (age 78)

Sport
- Sport: Rowing

Peter Salzbacher (born 29 May 1946) is an Austrian rower. He competed in the men's coxed pair event at the 1964 Summer Olympics.
