= Oprea Păunescu =

Romanian rower

Personal information
- Born: 6 July 1936 (age 89) Bucharest, Romania
- Height: 169 cm (5 ft 7 in)
- Weight: 51 kg (112 lb)

Sport
- Sport: Rowing
Medal record
Men's rowing
Representing Romania
World Championships
Silver medal – second place	1962 Lucerne	Coxed pair
European Championships
Bronze medal – third place	1959 Mâcon	Coxed pair
Silver medal – second place	1961 Prague	Coxed pair
Bronze medal – third place	1963 Copenhagen	Coxed pair

Oprea Păunescu (born 6 July 1936) is a Romanian rower. He competed at the 1964 Summer Olympics in Tokyo with the men's coxed pair where they came tenth.
