= Manfred Misselhorn =

German rower (born 1938)

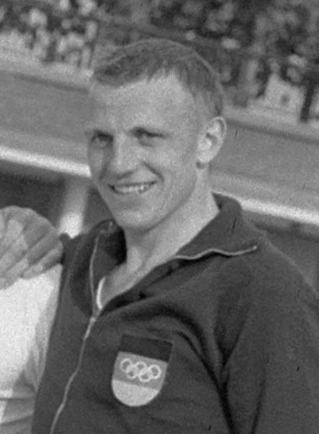
- Manfred Misselhorn in 1964

Personal information
- Born: 29 July 1938 (age 87) Fallersleben, Germany
- Height: 1.89 m (6 ft 2 in)
- Weight: 84 kg (185 lb)

Sport
- Sport: Rowing
- Club: RC Germania Düsseldorf
Medal record
Representing Germany
European Rowing Championships
Gold medal – first place	1964 Amsterdam	Coxless four

Manfred Misselhorn (born 29 July 1938) is a retired German rower who specialized in the coxless four. In this event, he won the European title in 1964 and finished in sixth place at the 1964 Summer Olympics.
