= Slavko Janjušević =

Croatian rower

Personal information
- Nationality: Croatian
- Born: 7 May 1941; Nikšić, Yugoslavia
- Died: 6 October 2007 (aged 66); Bled, Slovenia

Sport
- Sport: Rowing

Slavko Janjušević (7 May 1941 – 6 October 2007) was a Croatian rower. He competed in the men's coxed pair event at the 1964 Summer Olympics.
