= Wayne Gammon =

Australian rower

Personal information
- Nationality: Australian
- Born: 2 July 1950 (age 75)

Sport
- Sport: Rowing
- Club: Nagambie Rowing Club; Mercantile Rowing Club

Achievements and titles
- Olympic finals: Men's coxed pair B Final

Wayne Gammon (born 2 July 1950) is an Australian former representative rowing coxswain. He competed in the men's coxed pair event at the 1964 Summer Olympics.

== Local rowing and national titles ==
Gammon was raised in country Victoria. His junior club rowing was from the Nagambie Rowing Club in Victoria's Goulburn Valley. Aged sixteen he moved to Melbourne and coxed at Mercantile Rowing Club from 1966-68 before weight prevented him from carrying on.

The young and competitive Nagambie pair of Neil Lodding and Bruce Richardson began having noted success on the Victorian state racing scene from 1961 and were building to an Olympic selection goal for 1964. At the beginning of the 1963-64 season, steering and coxing shortcomings were holding the pair back as a coxed boat. Gammon was called into the crew that season and was on the rudder when they won the 1964 national title gold as a coxed pair.

After retiring from coxing Gammon remained involved with the Nagambie Club as a committee-man.

== International representative ==
Selection trials were held in 1964 for the Tokyo Olympics rowing squad on Lake Burley Griffin. Lodding, Richardson and Gammon won their trial and the right to represent. In Tokyo they placed third in their heat, second in their repechage and rowed in the B final where they paced third for an overall ninth ranking at the Olympic regatta.
