= Edward Ferry =

American rower (1941–2023)

Personal information
- Full name: Edward Payson Ferry
- Born: June 18, 1941 Seattle, Washington, U.S.
- Died: September 18, 2023 (aged 82) Mill Valley, California, U.S.
Medal record
Men's rowing
Representing the United States
Olympic Games
Gold medal – first place	1964 Tokyo	Coxed pair

Edward Payson Ferry (June 18, 1941 – September 18, 2023) was an American competition rower and Olympic champion.

== Biography ==
Born in Seattle, Washington, Ferry won a gold medal in coxed pairs at the 1964 Summer Olympics with Conn Findlay. They were first partnered in 1961, when Ferry was a 19-year-old sophomore at Stanford with only a year of rowing experience.

Ferry won a gold medal at the 1963 Pan American Games in the coxed pair.

Edward Ferry died in Mill Valley, California on September 18, 2023, at the age of 82.
