= Aldona Klimavičiūtė =

Lithuanian rower

Personal information
- Born: 27 March 1940 (age 86) Prienai, Lithuania

Sport
- Sport: Rowing
Medal record
Representing the Soviet Union
European Rowing Championships
Silver medal – second place	1964 Amsterdam	Eight

Aldona Klimavičiūtė (born 27 March 1940) is a retired Lithuanian rower who won a silver medal in the eight event at the 1964 European Championships. In 1962 Čiukšytė graduated from the Economics Faculty of Vilnius University. Between 1963 and 1969 she worked as a rowing coach and from 1969 to 2008 as an accountant with the Lithuanian National Symphony Orchestra.
