= Masahiro Takatsuki =

Japanese rower (born 1942)

Personal information
- Nationality: Japanese
- Born: 8 February 1942 (age 83)

Sport
- Sport: Rowing

Masahiro Takatsuki (高月 正宏, Takatsuki Masahiro, born 8 February 1942) is a Japanese rower. He competed in the men's coxed pair event at the 1964 Summer Olympics.
