= Günter Schroers =

German rower

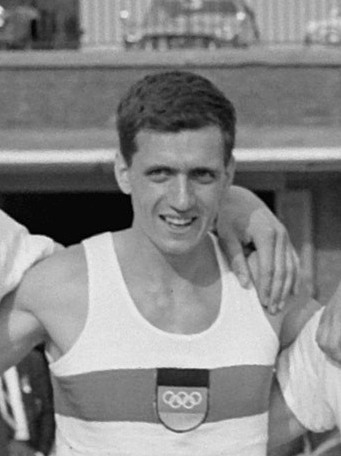
- Günter Schroers in 1964

Personal information
- Born: 11 January 1939 (age 87) Flensburg, Germany
- Height: 1.93 m (6 ft 4 in)
- Weight: 82 kg (181 lb)

Sport
- Sport: Rowing
- Club: RC Germania Düsseldorf
Medal record
Representing West Germany
European Rowing Championships
Silver medal – second place	1959 Mâcon	Coxless four
Bronze medal – third place	1961 Prague	Coxless four
Gold medal – first place	1964 Amsterdam	Coxless four

Günter Schroers (born 11 January 1939) is a retired German rower who specialized in the coxless fours. In this event he won three medals at European championships of 1959–1964 and finished in sixth place at the 1964 Summer Olympics.
