= Mahmoud Nasser =

Egyptian rower

Personal information
- Nationality: Egyptian
- Born: 21 August 1936 (age 88)

Sport
- Sport: Rowing

Mahmoud Nasser (born 21 August 1936) is an Egyptian rower. He competed in the men's coxed pair event at the 1964 Summer Olympics.
