= Neil Lodding =

Australian rower

Personal information
- Full name: Neil Walter Lodding
- Nationality: Australian
- Born: 2 October 1943 (age 82)

Sport
- Sport: Rowing
- Club: Nagambie Rowing Club

Achievements and titles
- Olympic finals: Men's coxed pair B Final

Neil Lodding (born 2 October 1943) is an Australian former representative rower. He competed in the men's coxed pair event at the 1964 Summer Olympics.

== Local rowing and national titles ==
Lodding was raised in country Victoria. His junior and senior club rowing was from the Nagambie Rowing Club in Victoria's Goulburn Valley. His career was guided and coached by his father Alf Lodding the club captain and senior coach at Nagambie. Alf had represented for Victoria in the Kings Cup eights of 1934 and 1935.

Neil Lodding began rowing and racing in a pair with Bruce Richardson when they were just 17 and they won a state junior title and a state country title in the 1961 season. They aimed for selection for the 1962 Commonwealth Games but were beaten out by the Mosman Rowing Club pair of Maurie Grace and Bill Hatfield. They continued to win Victorian state titles in coxed and coxless pairs throughout 1962, 63 and 64. At the inaugural Australian Rowing Championships in 1962 they took the bronze in the national coxless pair championship, then in 1964 they took silver as a coxless pair and won the gold as a coxed pair with Wayne Gammon on the rudder.

After retiring from competitive rowing Lodding continued a long association with the Nagambie Club as Club Captain, Secretary and President.

== International representative ==
Selection trials were held in 1964 for the Tokyo Olympics rowing squad on Lake Burley Griffin. Lodding, Richardson and Gammon won their trial and the right to represent. In Tokyo they placed third in their heat, second in their repechage and rowed in the B final where they paced third for an overall ninth ranking at the Olympic regatta.
