= Herman Rouwé =

Dutch rower

Personal information
- Born: 20 January 1943 (age 83) Grou, the Netherlands
- Height: 1.79 m (5 ft 10 in)
- Weight: 80 kg (180 lb)

Sport
- Sport: Rowing
- Club: Triton, Utrecht
Medal record
Olympic Games
Bronze medal – third place	1964 Tokyo	Coxed pair

Herman Jan Rouwé (born 20 January 1943) is a retired Dutch rower who competed at the 1964 and 1968 Summer Olympics. In 1964, he won a bronze medal in the coxed pairs event, together with Erik Hartsuiker and Jan-Just Bos. Four years later he finished ninth in the coxed fours competition.

His younger brother Henk was also an Olympic rower.
