= Albrecht Müller =

West German rower (1939–2018)

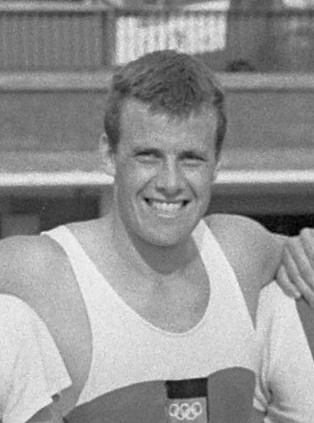
- Müller in 1964

Personal information
- Born: Albrecht Christoph Müller; 4 November 1939 Oldenburg, Germany
- Died: 24 May 2018 (aged 78)
- Height: 1.90 m (6 ft 3 in)
- Weight: 95 kg (209 lb)

Sport
- Sport: Rowing
- Club: RC Germania Düsseldorf
Medal record
Men's rowing
Representing West Germany
European Championships
Gold medal – first place	1964 Amsterdam	Coxless four

Albrecht Christoph Müller (4 November 1939 – 24 May 2018) was a rower who competed for West Germany. In 1964 he joined the German coxless four rowing team, winning a European title and finishing sixth at the 1964 Summer Olympics. He served as the president of the RC Germania Düsseldorf from 1990 until his retirement in 2000, at which point the new role of honorary chairman was created for him. He died in 2018.

His son Linus Müller represented Germany in field hockey at the 2020 Summer Olympics.
