= Jacques Morel (rower) =

French rower (born 1935)

Personal information
- Born: 22 September 1935 (age 90) La Teste-de-Buch
- Height: 193 cm (6 ft 4 in)
- Weight: 81 kg (179 lb)
- Relatives: Georges Morel (brother)

Sport
- Sport: Rowing
Medal record
Men's rowing
Representing France
Olympic Games
Silver medal – second place	1960 Rome	Coxed four
Silver medal – second place	1964 Tokyo	Coxed pair
World Championships
Silver medal – second place	1966 Bled	Coxed pair
Bronze medal – third place	1962 Lucerne	Eight

Jacques Morel (French pronunciation: [ʒak mɔʁɛl]; born 22 September 1935) is a French rower who competed in the 1960 Summer Olympics and in the 1964 Summer Olympics.

He was born in La Teste-de-Buch. In 1960 he was a crew member of the French boat that won the silver medal in the coxed four event. Four years later he won his second silver medal with the French boat in the coxed pair competition partnered with his younger brother Georges Morel.
