= Natalio Rossi =

Argentine rower (born 1934)

Personal information
- Nationality: Argentine
- Born: 22 February 1934 (age 91)

Sport
- Sport: Rowing

Natalio Pablo Rossi (born 22 February 1934) is an Argentine rower. He competed in the men's coxed pair event at the 1964 Summer Olympics.
