= Georges Morel =

French rower (1938–2004)

Personal information
- Born: 11 July 1938 La Teste-de-Buch
- Died: 21 November 2004 (aged 66) La Teste-de-Buch
- Height: 188 cm (6 ft 2 in)
- Weight: 92 kg (203 lb)
- Relatives: Jacques Morel (brother)

Sport
- Sport: Rowing
Medal record
Men's rowing
Representing France
Olympic Games
Silver medal – second place	1964 Tokyo	Coxed pair
World Championships
Silver medal – second place	1966 Bled	Coxed pair
Bronze medal – third place	1962 Lucerne	Eight

Georges Morel (11 July 1938 – 21 November 2004) was a French rower who competed in the 1964 Summer Olympics.

Morel was born in La Teste-de-Buch in 1938 and died there in 2004, aged 66. In 1964 he was a crew member of the French boat that won the silver medal in the coxed pair event partnered with his elder brother Jacques Morel.
