= Nikolay Safronov =

Russian rower

Personal information
- Born: 8 May 1940 (age 86)
- Height: 1.85 m (6 ft 1 in)
- Weight: 83 kg (183 lb)

Sport
- Sport: Rowing
- Club: Spartak Moscow
Medal record
Representing the Soviet Union
European Rowing Championships
Silver medal – second place	1964 Amsterdam	Coxed pair
Gold medal – first place	1965 Duisburg	Coxed pair

Nikolay Vasilyevich Safronov (Russian: Николай Васильевич Сафронов; born 8 May 1940) is a retired Russian rower who had his best achievements in the coxed pairs, together with Leonid Rakovshchik and Igor Rudakov. In this event they won two European medals in 1964 and 1965 and finished fourth at the 1964 Summer Olympics.

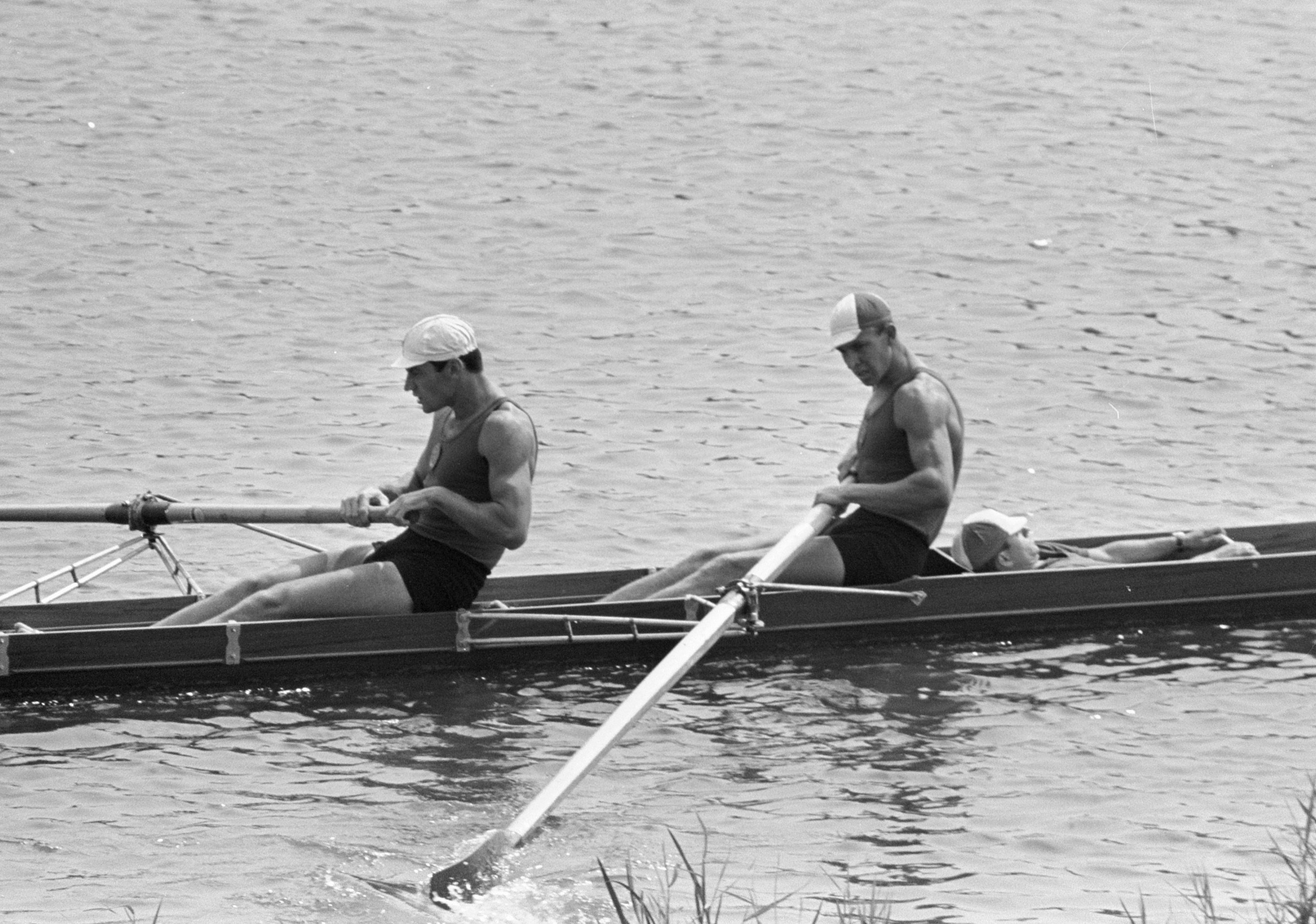
Rakovshchik, Safronov and Rudakov at the 1964 European Rowing Championships
