= Mohamed El-Halawani =

Egyptian rower

Personal information
- Nationality: Egyptian
- Born: 15 August 1936 (age 88)

Sport
- Sport: Rowing

Mohamed El-Halawani (born 15 August 1936) is an Egyptian rower. He competed in the men's coxed pair event at the 1964 Summer Olympics.
