= Hugo Waser =

Swiss rower

Personal information
- Born: 9 August 1936 (age 89) Stansstad

Sport
- Sport: Rowing
Medal record
Men's rowing
Representing Switzerland
Olympic Games
Bronze medal – third place	1968 Mexico City	Coxed four
World Rowing Championships
Bronze medal – third place	1962 Lucerne	Coxless pair
European Rowing Championships
Bronze medal – third place	1969 Klagenfurt	Coxed four

Hugo Waser (born 9 August 1936) is a Swiss rower who competed in the 1960 Summer Olympics, in the 1964 Summer Olympics, and in the 1968 Summer Olympics.

Waser was born in Stansstad. In 1960 Waser was eliminated in the repechage of the single sculls event. Four years later he was a crew member of the Swiss boat which finished eleventh in the coxed pair competition. At the 1968 Games he won the bronze medal with the Swiss boat in the coxed four competition.
