= Adolf Waser =

Swiss rower

Personal information
- Nationality: Swiss
- Born: 5 February 1938
- Died: 28 November 2024 (aged 86) Stansstad, Canton of Nidwalden, Switzerland

Sport
- Sport: Rowing

Adolf Waser (5 February 1938 – 28 November 2024) was a Swiss rower. He competed in the men's coxed pair event at the 1964 Summer Olympics.
