= Kazimierz Naskręcki =

Polish rower

Personal information
- Born: Kazimierz Tadeusz Naskręcki; 4 March 1938 (age 88) Kalisz, Poland
- Height: 186 cm (6 ft 1 in)
- Weight: 88 kg (194 lb)

Sport
- Sport: Rowing
Medal record
Men's rowing
Representing Poland
European Rowing Championships
| Bronze medal – third place | 1964 Amsterdam | Coxed pair |

Kazimierz Tadeusz Naskręcki (born 4 March 1938, in Kalisz) is a retired Polish Olympic rower.
