= Zdeněk Mejstřík =

Czech rower

Personal information
- Nationality: Czech
- Born: 1 January 1948 (age 77); Prague, Czechoslovakia

Sport
- Sport: Rowing

Zdeněk Mejstřík (born 1 January 1948) is a Czech rower. He competed in the men's coxed pair event at the 1964 Summer Olympics.
