= Stanisław Kozera =

Polish rower

Personal information
- Born: 27 January 1943 (age 83) Trzebnica, Poland
- Height: 163 cm (5 ft 4 in)
- Weight: 50 kg (110 lb)

Sport
- Sport: Rowing
Medal record
Men's rowing
Representing Poland
European Rowing Championships
Bronze medal – third place	1964 Amsterdam	Coxed pair

Stanisław Kozera (born 27 January 1943 in Trzebnica) is a retired Polish Olympic coxswain.
