= Gheorghe Riffelt =

Romanian rower

Personal information
- Nationality: Romanian
- Born: 6 January 1936 (age 90) Târnăveni, Romania

Sport
- Sport: Rowing

Gheorghe Riffelt (born 6 January 1936) is a Romanian rower. He competed at the 1960 Summer Olympics and the 1964 Summer Olympics.
