= Marian Siejkowski =

Polish rower

Personal information
- Born: 29 August 1940 Poznań, Poland
- Died: 31 October 1990 (aged 50) Poznań, Poland
- Height: 196 cm (6 ft 5 in)
- Weight: 96 kg (212 lb)

Sport
- Sport: Rowing
Medal record
Men's rowing
Representing Poland
European Rowing Championships
Bronze medal – third place	1964 Amsterdam	Coxed pair

Marian Siejkowski (29 August 1940 in Poznań – 31 October 1990 in Poznań) was a Polish Olympic rower.
