= Tatyana Markvo =

Russian rower

Personal information
- Born: Tatyana Mikhailovna Markvo; 8 August 1941 (age 84) Moscow, Russia
- Spouse: Leonid Rakovshchik

Sport
- Sport: Rowing
- Club: Dynamo
Medal record
Representing the Soviet Union
Women's rowing
European Rowing Championships
Silver medal – second place	1966 Amsterdam	Quad sculls
Gold medal – first place	1967 Vichy	Quad sculls
Bronze medal – third place	1968 East Berlin	Double sculls
Bronze medal – third place	1969 Klagenfurt	Double sculls
Silver medal – second place	1971 Copenhagen	Quad sculls

Tatyana Mikhailovna Markvo (later Rakovshchik, Russian: Татьяна Михайловна Маркво (Раковщик), born 8 August 1941) is a retired Russian rower who won five medals in double and quad sculls at the European championships of 1966–1971. Her husband Leonid Rakovshchik also competed internationally in rowing.
