= Niels Olsen (rowing) =

Danish rower

Personal information
- Full name: Niels Alfred Olsen
- Nationality: Danish
- Born: 28 December 1948 (age 77) Faxe, Denmark

Sport
- Sport: Rowing

Niels Olsen (born 28 December 1948) is a Danish rower. He competed in the men's coxed pair event at the 1964 Summer Olympics.
