= Shoko Hamada =

Shoko Hamada may refer to:

- Shoko Hamada (footballer), Japanese women's footballer
- Shoko Hamada (entertainer) (born 1986), Japanese television personality, gravure idol and race queen
