= Karl-Heinz Danielowski =

East German rower

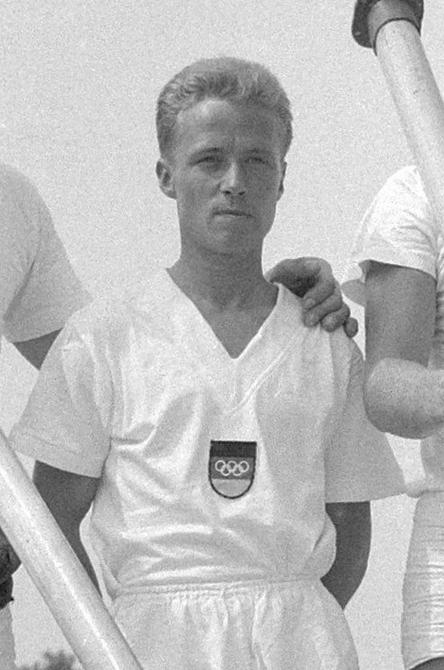
- Danielowski at the 1964 European Championships

Personal information
- Born: 31 March 1940 (age 86) Sülldorf, Germany
- Height: 1.65 m (5 ft 5 in)
- Weight: 50 kg (110 lb)

Sport
- Sport: Rowing
- Club: ASK Vorwärts Rostock
Medal record
Representing East Germany
Olympic Games
Gold medal – first place	1976 Montreal	Eight
World Rowing Championships
Silver medal – second place	1970 St. Catharines	Coxed four
European Rowing Championships
Gold medal – first place	1964 Amsterdam	Coxed pair
Gold medal – first place	1973 Moscow	Eight

Karl-Heinz Danielowski (born 31 March 1940) is a retired German coxswain. He competed for the United Team of Germany at the 1964 Summer Olympics and for East Germany at the 1968 and 1976 Summer Olympics. In 1964 and 1968 he finished in seventh place in the coxed pairs and eights, respectively, whereas in 1976 he won a gold medal in the eight.

Danielowski also won two European titles, in 1964 and 1973, and a silver at the 1970 World Rowing Championships.
