= Leonid Rakovshchik =

Russian rower

Personal information
- Born: 2 November 1938 (age 87)
- Height: 1.95 m (6 ft 5 in)
- Weight: 91 kg (201 lb)
- Spouse: Tatyana Markvo

Sport
- Sport: Rowing
- Club: Spartak Moscow
Medal record
Representing the Soviet Union
European Rowing Championships
Silver medal – second place	1964 Amsterdam	Coxed pair
Gold medal – first place	1965 Duisburg	Coxed pair

Leonid Maksimovich Rakovshchik (Russian: Леонид Максимович Раковщик; born 2 November 1938) is a retired Russian rower who had his best achievements in the coxed pairs, together with Nikolay Safronov and Igor Rudakov. In this event they won two European medals in 1964 and 1965 and finished fourth at the 1964 Summer Olympics. His wife Tatyana Markvo also competed internationally in rowing.
