= Toshihiro Hamada =

Japanese rower (born 1941)

Personal information
- Nationality: Japanese
- Born: 23 October 1941 (age 83)

Sport
- Sport: Rowing

Toshihiro Hamada (浜田 俊裕, Hamada Toshihiro, born 23 October 1941) is a Japanese rower. He competed in the men's coxed pair event at the 1964 Summer Olympics.
