= Peter Gorny =

German rower

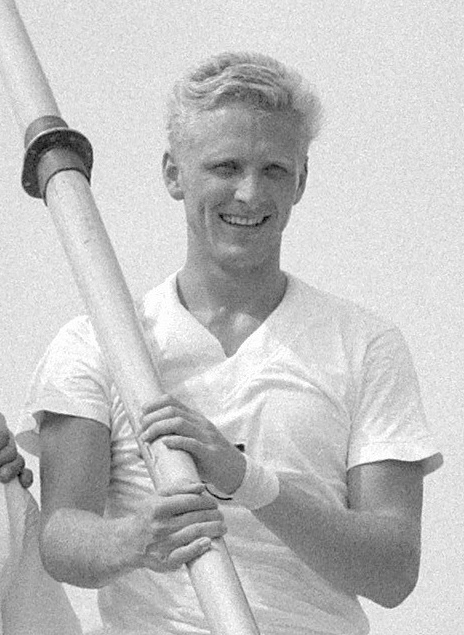
- Gorny at the 1964 European Championships

Personal information
- Born: 20 April 1941 (age 85) Ammendorf, Germany
- Height: 1.89 m (6 ft 2 in)
- Weight: 84 kg (185 lb)

Sport
- Sport: Rowing
- Club: ASK Vorwärts Rostock
Medal record
Representing East Germany
World Rowing Championships
| Gold medal – first place | 1970 St. Catharines | Coxless pair |
European Rowing Championships
| Gold medal – first place | 1964 Amsterdam | Coxed pair |
| Silver medal – second place | 1967 Vichy | Coxless pair |
| Bronze medal – third place | 1969 Klagenfurt | Coxless four |
| Gold medal – first place | 1971 Copenhagen | Coxless pair |

Peter Gorny (born 20 April 1941) is a retired German rower. He competed for the United Team of Germany at the 1964 Summer Olympics in the coxed pairs and for East Germany at the 1968 Summer Olympics in eights and finished in seventh place on both occasions. Gorny also won a world title in the coxed pairs in 1970 and four medals at the European championships of 1964–1971, including two gold medals.
