= Robert Hamada (woodworker) =

Robert Hamada(June 2, 1921 – December 23, 2014) is a self-taught woodturner on the island of Kauai in Hawaii He started practicing his craft at the age of 12 out of necessity His bowls are part of the Museum of Fine Arts, Boston and Museum of Fine Arts, Detroit collections, have been exhibited in the Bangladesh embassy and are also part of numerous private collections. Before focusing exclusively on woodworking, Hamada worked as an engineer at the Coco Palms Resort and Kauai Surf. He was also a breeder of some of the finest big-game hunting dogs in Hawaii. He has received two Living Treasure of Hawaii awards. His first, in 1997 was awarded to him by the Kauai Museum. His second, in 2014 was awarded to him by The Honpa Hongwanji Mission of Hawaii. Hamada is survived by his three children (Ann McLaughlin, Donald Hamada and Robert Hamada), his brother Hiroshi Hamada and two grandchildren (Nathan and Tiffany).
