= Yamaoka Kagetaka =

Japanese samurai

Yamaoka Kagetaka (山岡景隆, 1526 – February 13, 1585) was a Japanese samurai of the Sengoku period through early Azuchi–Momoyama period, who served the Oda clan.
