= Hamada Kagetaka =

Hamada Kagetaka (浜田 景隆, 1554–1591) was a samurai of the late Sengoku period of Japanese history, who served as a senior retainer of the Date clan, under both Date Terumune and Masamune. Kagetaka was in command of the reserve unit at the Battle of Suriage-ga-hara. He was in command during the Ōsaki offensive of 1588; however, he was unable to take effective command and was killed by the Ōsaki and Kasai forces at the Battle of Miyazaki Castle.
