= List of Pan American Games medalists in rowing =

This is the complete list of Pan American Games medalists in rowing from 1951 to 2019.

== Event ==
=== Men's single sculls ===
Games	Gold	Silver	Bronze
1951	Roberto Alfieri; Argentina	None awarded	None awarded
1955	John Kelly; United States	Juan Rodríguez; Uruguay	Norberto Battaglia; Argentina
1959	Harry Parker; United States	Anthony Biernacki; Canada	Paulo Carvalho; Uruguay
1963	Seymour Cromwell; United States	Ivan Pital; Brazil	None awarded
1967	Alberto Demiddi; Argentina	John Nunn; United States	Otto Plettner; Mexico
1971	Alberto Demiddi; Argentina	William Titus; United States	Ramón Luperón; Cuba
1975	Ricardo Ibarra; Argentina	James Dietz; United States	Federico Scheffler; Mexico
1979	Ricardo Ibarra; Argentina	Phil Monckton; Canada	James Dietz; United States
1983	Ricardo Ibarra; Argentina	Mel LaForme; Canada	Sean Colgan; United States
1987	Jesús Posse; Uruguay	Joaquín Gómez; Mexico	Elexey Marrero; Cuba
1991	Joaquín Gómez; Mexico	Sergio Fernández; Argentina	Todd Hallett; Canada
1995	Sergio Fernández; Argentina	Cyrus Beasley; United States	Leonides Samé; Cuba
1999	Derek Porter; Canada	Aquil Abdullah; United States	Yoennis Hernández; Cuba
2003	Yoennis Hernández; Cuba	Santiago Fernández; Cuba	Andrew Liverman; United States
2007	Santiago Fernández; Argentina	Yoennis Hernández; Cuba	Marcelus dos Santos; Brazil
2011	Ángel Fournier; Cuba	Patrick Loliger; Mexico	Emilio Torres; Venezuela
2015	Ángel Fournier; Cuba	Robert Gibson; Canada	Brian Rosso; Argentina
2019	Ángel Fournier; Cuba	Juan Carlos Cabrera; Mexico	Brian Rosso; Argentina
2023	Lucas Verthein; Brazil	James Plihal; United States	Juan José Flores; Mexico

=== Men's double sculls ===
Games	Gold	Silver	Bronze
1951	Argentina; Adolfo Yedro; Mario Guerci	None awarded	None awarded
1955	United States; Walter Hoover; Jim Gardiner	Argentina; Carlos Pineiro; Juan Cremer	Mexico; Hugo Enriquez; Helmuth Roesler
1959	United States; John Kelly; Bill Knecht	Uruguay; Mariano Caulín; Paulo Carvalho	Peru; Jorge Calderón; Reginal Santos
1963	United States; Bill Knecht; Robert Cabeen	Argentina; Alberto Demiddi; Antonio Soma	Brazil; Edgard Gijsen; Francisco Todesco
1967	United States; James Dietz; Jim Storm	Canada; Douglas Clark; Leif Gotfredsen	Argentina; Alberto Dulce; Hector Ferreira
1971	Brazil; Harri Klein; Edgard Gijsen	Argentina; Claudio Krotsch; Alfredo Krotsch	United States; John Nunn; Tom McKibbon
1975	Brazil; Gilberto Gerhardt; Mario Castro-Filho	United States; Michael Verlin; Lawrence Klecatsky	Cuba; Federico Castillo; Ruben Avin
1979	Canada; Pat Walter; Bruce Ford	United States; Christopher Allsopp; Thomas Howes	Cuba; Horacio Cabrera; Francisco Rodríguez
1983	Canada; Robert Mills; Philip Haggerty	United States; Curtis Fleming; James Dietz	Cuba; Eduardo Castro; Miguel Castro
1987	United States; John Biglow; Greg Walker	Chile; Alejandro Hube; Marcelo Hube	Argentina; Claudio Guindón; Rubén D'Andrilli
1991	Cuba; Sanchez; Ramirez	Canada; Dave Dickison; Don Dickison	Argentina; Max Holdo; Pfano
1995	Argentina; Rubén Knulst; Guillermo Pfaab	Brazil; Antonio Marinho; Marcelus dos Santos	Canada; Todd Hallett; Henry Hering
1999	Argentina; Walter Balunek; Damian Ordás	Brazil; Gibran Cunha; Alexander Altair Soares	Canada; Phil Graham; Kevin White
2003	Cuba; Yosbel Martínez; Yoennis Hernández	Brazil; Anderson Nocetti; Marcelus dos Santos	United States; Conal Groom; Sloan DuRoss
2007	Cuba; Yoennis Hernández; Janier Concepción	Argentina; Rodrigo Murillo; Ariel Suárez	United States; Deaglan McEachern; Francis Cuddy
2011	Argentina; Cristian Rosso; Ariel Suárez	Cuba; Janier Concepción; Yoennis Hernández	Venezuela; César Amaris; José Güipe
2015	Cuba; Eduardo Rubio; Ángel Fournier	Argentina; Cristian Rosso; Rodrigo Murillo	Canada; Pascal Lussier; Matthew Buie
2019	Argentina; Rodrigo Murillo; Cristian Rosso	Cuba; Boris Guerra; Adrián Oquendo	Brazil; Uncas Batista; Lucas Verthein
2023	Uruguay; Newton Seawright; Martín Zocalo	Cuba; Reidy Cardona; Carlos Ajete	United States; Casey Fuller; Mark Couwenhoven

=== Men's quadruple sculls ===
Games	Gold	Silver	Bronze
1975	Cuba; Francisco Rodríguez; Nelson Simon; Rigoberto Suarez; Ramón Luperón	United States; Jack St Clair; John Sonberg; James Ricksecker; Henry Killen	Mexico; Pablo Rion; Edgar Tams; Gustavo Scheffler; Ricardo Scheffler
1979	Cuba; Cesar Herrera; Nelson Simon; Roberto Quintero; Miguel Castro	Brazil; José Cláudio Lazzarotto; Waldemar Trombetta; Paulo Dworakowski; Gilberto Gerhardt	United States; Christopher Wood; Bruce Beall; Gregg Stone; Alan Shealy
1983	Canada; Philip Haggerty; Robert Mills; Mel LaForme; Greg Murphy	Cuba; Alberto Castro; Arturo Salfran; Cesar Herrera; Orestes Vega	Argentina; Federico Lungwitz; Ricardo González; Omar Ferrari; Oscar Santorsola
1991	Cuba; Unknown rowers	United States; Matt Horvat; Andrew Morrow; James Moulton; Frank Rowe	Mexico; Eduardo Arrillaga
1995	Argentina; Sergio Fernández González; Santiago Fernández; Rubén Knulst; Guillermo Pfaab	United States; David Gleeson; Jason Gailes; Brian Jamieson; Tim Young	Cuba; O. Gutierrez; J. Gonzalez Garcia; Leonides Samé; O. Ramirez Cabrera
2003	Cuba; Dioglis Abad; Yoennis Hernández; Yosbel Martínez; Yuleidys Cascaret	Uruguay; Andres Medina; Leandro Salvagno Rattaro; Rodolfo Collazo; Ruben Scarpati	Brazil; Allan Bitencourt; Anderson Nocetti; Leandro Tozzo; Marcelus Marcili
2007	Cuba; Yuleidys Cascaret; Janier Concepción; Ángel Fournier; Yoennis Hernández	Argentina; Víctor Claus; Ariel Suárez; Santiago Fernández; Cristian Rosso	United States; Warren Anderson; Jamie Schroeder; Deaglan McEachern; Francis Cuddy
2011	Argentina; Alejandro Cucchietti; Santiago Fernández; Cristian Rosso; Ariel Suárez	Cuba; Janier Concepción; Adrián Oquendo; Eduardo Eubio; Yoennis Hernández	Mexico; Horacio Rangel; Edgar Valenzuela; Patrick Loliger; Santiago Sataella
2015	Canada; Julien Bahain; Matthew Buie; Will Dean; Robert Gibson	Cuba; Adrián Oquendo; Orlando Sotolongo; Eduardo Rubio; Ángel Fournier	Argentina; Cristian Rosso; Osvaldo Suárez; Rodrigo Murillo; Brian Rosso
2019	Argentina; Rodrigo Murillo; Brian Rosso; Cristian Rosso; Ariel Suárez	Cuba; Reidy Cardona; Boris Guerra; Adrián Oquendo; Jorge Patterson	Mexico; Hugo Carpio; Jordy Gutiérrez; Diego Sánchez; Miguel Carballo
2023	Uruguay; Bruno Cetraro; Marcos Sarraute; Felipe Klüver; Leandro Salvagno	Chile; Francisco Lapostol; Brahim Alvayay; Óscar Vásquez; Andoni Habash	Mexico; Ricardo de la Rosa; Tomás Manzanillo; Andre Simsch; Rafael Mejía

=== Men's coxless pair ===
Games	Gold	Silver	Bronze
1951	Argentina; Alberto Madero; Óscar Almirón	Brazil; Walter Karl; Henrique Fuskini	None awarded
1955	Argentina; Jorge Glusman; Eduardo Glusman	United States; Charlie Logg; Tom Price	Mexico; Walter Schreiberg; Luis Schreiberg
1959	United States; Ted Frost; Bob Rogers	Brazil; Milton Bruno; Edgard Gijsen	Argentina; Carlos Castillo; Julio Citta
1963	Uruguay; Mariano Caulín; Gustavo Pérez	United States; Daniel Watts; Robert Clayton	Argentina; Ricardo Durán; Carlos Montaldo
1967	United States; Tony Johnson; Larry Hough	Canada; Daryl Sturdy; Wayne Osterhout	Mexico; Antonio Roynoso; David Trejo
1971	Argentina; Ricardo Rodríguez; Guillermo Segurado	Brazil; Milton Texeira; Wandir Kuntze	United States; Robert Wethmoore; Andrew Roberta
1975	Brazil; Érico de Souza; Raúl Bagattini	Argentina; Jorge Molina; Juan Tuma	Uruguay; Juan Oberti; Oscar Caeiro
1979	Canada; Brian Dick; Tim Storm	United States; Dave Fellows; Richard Cashin	Cuba; Abel Rodríguez; Rene Pumariega
1983	Brazil; Ronaldo de Carvalho; Ricardo de Carvalho	Argentina; Claudio Guindón; Rubén D'Andrilli	United States; Willard Donoho; John Jablonic
1987	Brazil; Ricardo de Carvalho; Ronaldo de Carvalho	Canada; Jamie Schaffer; Darby Berkhout	Argentina; Daniel Scuri; Claudio Águila
1991	Cuba; Ismael Carbonell; Hermes Castellanos	Canada; Michael Forgeron; Steve Frisch	Brazil; Carlos Almeida; Cláudio Tavares
1995	United States; Don Smith; Fredric Honebein	Argentina; Daniel Scuri; Mariano Kowalczyk	Brazil; Carlos Almeida; Cláudio Tavares
1999	Argentina; Damian Ordás; Walter Balunek	Brazil; Alexander Altair Soares; Gibran Cunha	Canada; Phil Graham; Kevin White
2003	Argentina; Walter Naneder; Marcos Morales	Brazil; Alexander Altair Soares; Gibran Cunha	Cuba; Manuel Cascaret; Luis Cruz
2007	Canada; Dan Casaca; Christopher Jarvis	United States; Dan Beery; Patrick O'Dunne	Brazil; Anderson Nocetti; Allan Bitencourt
2011	United States; Michael Gennaro; Robert "Ty" Otto	Brazil; Joao Borges; Alexis Mestre	Canada; Peter McClelland; Steven Van Knotsenburg
2015	Argentina; Axel Haack; Diego López	None awarded (tie for gold)	Mexico; Diego Sánchez; Leopoldo Tejera
2015	Chile; Félipe Leal; Óscar Vásquez	None awarded (tie for gold)	Mexico; Diego Sánchez; Leopoldo Tejera
2019	Chile; Ignacio Abraham; Christopher Kalleg	Brazil; Pau Vela; Xavier Vela	Argentina; Agustín Díaz; Axel Haack
2023	United States; Alexander Hedge; Ezra Carlson	Uruguay; Esteban Sosa; Leandro Rodas	Mexico; Hugo Reyes; Jordy Gutierrez

=== Men's coxed pair ===
Games	Gold	Silver	Bronze
1951	Argentina; Jose Mazzolini; Jose Raudo; Adel Farias (cox)	None awarded	None awarded
1955	Argentina; Osvaldo Allegretti; Richardo Bratschi; Juan Vega (cox)	United States; John Kieffer; Thom McDonough; Paul McArdle (cox)	Chile; Guzman; Muller; Munoz (cox)
1959	Uruguay; Gustavo Pérez; Luis Aguiar; Raúl Torrieri (cox)	Argentina; Ricardo González; Jorge Somlay; Osvaldo Cavagnaro (cox)	United States; James McIntosh; Alan Pierrut; Harvey Kroll (cox)
1963	United States; Edward Ferry; Conn Findlay; Charles Blitzer (cox)	Argentina; Natalio Rossi; Juan Pedro Lier; Oscar Rompani (cox)	Brazil; Antemidio Juliao; Andifax Barbosa; Adriano Monteiro (cox)
1967	United States; Perry Meek; Gardner Cadwalader; James Fuhrman (cox)	Argentina; Vicente Dean; Rafael Gabbs; Aldo Pravia (cox)	Brazil; Sylvio de Souza; Claudio Angeli; Jose Angeli (cox)
1971	Brazil; Atalibio Magioni; Celenio Martins; Manuel Mandel (cox)	Cuba; Teófilo López; Lázaro Rivero; Jesús Rosello (cox)	Uruguay; Jorge Buenahora; Pedro Ciapessoni; Roque Martinez (cox)
1975	United States; Ken Dreyfuss; John Mathews; Darrell Vreugdenhil (cox)	Canada; James Henniger; Brian Love; Robert Battersby (cox)	Brazil; Edilson Bezerra; Antonio Pistoia; Francisco Tambasco (cox)
1979	Brazil; Wandir Kuntze; Laildo Machado; Manoel Therezo (cox)	Argentina; Alfredo Pereyra; Jorge Pereyra; Victor Yuri (cox)	Cuba; Raúl Quintana; Raúl Moreno; Silvio Rosabal (cox)
1983	Cuba; Ismael Carbonell; Danilo Mora; Enrique Carrillo (cox)	United States; George Livingston; Christopher Clark; Stephen Shellans Jr. (cox)	Peru; Francisco Viacava; Alfredo Montenegro; Arturo Valentín (cox)
1991	Cuba; Roberto Ojeda ?	Argentina; Andrés Seperizza; Gustavo Pacheco; Marcelo Pieretti	Brazil; Marcos Arantes; Alexandre Fernandes
1995	Cuba; Ismael Carbonell; J. Gonzalez Lao; Arnaldo Rodríguez	United States; Peter Cipollone; Tom Murray; Chris Swan	Argentina; F. Nagy; Mariano Kowalczyk; Daniel Scuri

=== Men's coxless four ===
Games	Gold	Silver	Bronze
1951	Argentina; Juan Ángel Aichino; Osvaldo Maia; Juan Gomez; Luis Pechenino	Brazil; Iva Ritman; Alberto Santos; Manuel Amorin; Alvaro Fonseca	None awarded
1955	Argentina; Ruben Cossettini; Guido Mazzotta; Juan Gomez; Luis Pechenino	United States; Robert Sanerwein; John Schnabel; Ronald Cardwell; James Hewson	Uruguay; Juan Cabillón; Luis Roggerone; Héctor Teixidor; Ruben Firpo
1959	United States; Ted Nash; Jay Hall; Rusty Wailes; John Sayre	Argentina; Juan Huber; Pablo Ferrero; Héctor Moni; Mario Maire	Chile; Nelson Casanova; Jorge Contreras; Hugo Escarez; Galvarino Guinati
1963	United States; Geza Berger; Charles Bower; Charles Holtz; Ted Nash	Brazil; Jorge Rodríguez; Fritz Mueller; Harri Klein; Edgard Knirien	Argentina; Eduardo Barry; Isidro Fernandez; Atilio Ensunza; Juan Francisco Zanassi
1967	United States; Lee Dewarest; Lawrence Gluckman; Robert Brayton; Sean Shea	Canada; Bruce Clark; Philip Webber; Andrew Netupsky; Richard Fearn	Mexico; Roberto Retolaza; Fernando Calleja; Arcadio Padilla; Javier Calleja
1971	Brazil; Milton Texeira; Wandir Kuntze; Miguel Bancar; Eriko Souza	Cuba; Porfirio Reynoso; Humberto Roca; Miguel Gonzalez; Eralio Cabrera	Argentina; José Manuel Bugia; Luciano Wilk; Tomás Forray; Oscar de Andrés
1975	United States; James Brinsfield; William Byrd; John Forster; Pat Hayes	Argentina; Jose Czcy; Osvaldo Quiroga; Carlos Denari; Pablo Velázquez	Canada; Michael Moran; Mike Neary; Alan Morrow; Ian Gordon
1979	Cuba; Wenceslao Borroto; Hermenegildo Palacio; Ismael Carbonell; Manuel Blanco	United States; Timothy Watenpaugh; Jesse Franklin; Darrell Vreugdenhil; Mike Teti	Brazil; Henrique Johann; Oscar Sommer; Mario Franco Castro; Raúl Bagattini
1983	Cuba; German Mederos; Hermenegildo Palacio; Gilberto Friol; Julian Pez	United States; Darrell Vreugdenhil; Brian Colgan; Russell Blount; John Strotbeck Jr.	Canada; Fred Loucks; Martin Mai; Mark Thomas; Joe Wilhelm
1987	Cuba; Gilberto Friol; Ismael Carbonell; Arnaldo Rodríguez; Roberto Torriente	United States; Dan Gehn; Brian Colgan; John Strotbeck Jr. Scott Erwin	Canada; Raymond Collier; Michael Rascher; Bruce Robertson; Scott Drossos
1991	Cuba; Unknown rowers	United States; Shane Petersen; Will Porter; Raoul Rodriguez; William Serad	Canada; Unknown rowers
1995	United States; Bob Kaehler; Sean Hall; Jon Brown; Jamie Koven	Canada; Phil Graham; Adam Parfitt; Ken Kozel; Greg Stevenson	Cuba; Ismael Carbonell; R. Rodriguez Laher; Eusebio Acea; Arnaldo Rodríguez
1999	Argentina; Guillermo Pfaab; Horacio Sicilia; Walter Balunek; Damian Ordás	United States; Mike Callahan; Jordan Irving; Martin Crotty; Jon Brown	Canada; Phil Graham; Kevin White; Ken Kozel; Andrew Hoskins
2003	Cuba; Luis Cruz; Manuel Cascaret; Reinier Lartiga; Yuleidys Cascaret	United States; Beau Hoopman; David Friedericks; Justin Bosley; Paul Daniels	Brazil; Alexandre Altair; Claudiomar Iung; Gibran Cunha; Oswaldo Kuster
2007	Argentina; Horacio Sicilia; Maximiliano Martínez; Joaquín Iwan; Diego López	United States; Gabe Winkler; Sebastian Bea; Tyler Winklevoss; Cameron Winklevoss	Canada; Todd Keesey; Vincent Goodfellow; David Lamb; Brent Heron
2011	Argentina; Sebastián Fernández; Joaquín Iwan; Rodrigo Murillo; Agustín Silvestro	Canada; David Wakulich; Kai Langerfeld; Blake Parsons; Spencer Crowley	Cuba; Yenser Basilo; Dionnis Carrion; Jorber Avila; Solaris Freire
2015	Canada; Will Crothers; Tim Schrijver; Kai Langerfeld; Conlin McCabe	Cuba; Manuel Suárez; Janier Concepción; Adrián Oquendo; Solaris Freire	Argentina; Joaquín Iwán; Francisco Esteras; Iván Carino; Agustín Diaz
2019	Argentina; Iván Carino; Agustín Díaz; Francisco Esteras; Azel Haack	Cuba; Carlos Ajete; Reidy Cardona; Eduardo González; Jesús Rodríguez	Brazil; Gabriel Campos; Alef Fontoura; Willian Giaretton; Fábio Moreira
2023	Chile; Alfredo Abraham; Ignacio Abraham; Nahuel Reyes; Marcelo Poo	Cuba; Andrey Barnet; Leduar Sánchez; Carlos Ajete; Reidy Cardona	Uruguay; Newton Seawright; Martín Zocalo; Marvos Sarraute; Leandro Salvagno

=== Men's coxed four ===
Games	Gold	Silver	Bronze
1951	Argentina; Enrique Precedo; Carlos Fischer; Roberto James; Alberto Thomas; Juan Villa (cox)	Chile; Hector Barria; Aldo Solis; Purisimo Guerrero; Juan Solis; Mario Matamala (cox)	Peru; Ernesto Mussio; Eduardo Romero; Jose Corigliano; Luis Corigliano; Francisco Colacci (cox)
1955	Argentina; Jorge Schneider; Alfredo Czerner; Juan Ecker; Emilio Czerner; Gerardo Santos (cox)	United States; George Hermann; George Dorwart; Irving Miller; Joseph Toland; Allen Rosenberg (cox)	Chile; Guzman; Muller; Zbiden; Gomez; Munoz (cox)
1959	United States; Charles Holtz; LeRoy Jones; Mike Yonker; Roy Rubin; Ray Walker (cox)	Argentina; Juan Pedro Lier; Roberto Parsoglio; Oscar Rompani; Jorge Somlay; Osvaldo Cavagnaro (cox)	Brazil; Adriano Monteiro; Joao Claixto; Nelson Guarda; Jorge Rodriquez; Manoel Armando (cox)
1963	Argentina; Juan Retegui; Ismael Santana; Juan Diaz; Roberto Gilardi; Gustavo Marzi (cox)	Brazil; Antemidio Juliao; Andifax Barbosa; Assis Garcia; Alberto Blemer; Silvio de Sousa (cox)	United States; Roy Rubin; Gene Phillips; Walter Wiberg; William Flint; Bernard Horton (cox)
1967	United States; William Stowe; Hugh Foley; Clem Kopf; Joseph Henwood; Róbert Zimonyi (cox)	Argentina; Hugo Aberastegui; Guillermo Segurado; Juan Gomez; José María Robledo; Rolando Locatelli (cox)	Cuba; Ramon Riley; Norge Marrero; Mario Tabio; Jorge López; Jesús Rosello (cox)
1971	Argentina; Hugo Aberastegui; Alfredo Martín; Oscar de Dios Villarruel; Ignacio Ruiz Díaz; Raúl Mazerati (cox)	Cuba; Teofilo Lores; Lázaro Rivero; Troadio Delgado; Germindo Marrero; Jesús Rosello (cox)	United States; Calvin Coffey; Pete Karassik; Bill Miller; Victor Pisinski; Bob Brody (cox)
1975	Canada; Brian Dick; Phil Monckton; Ron Burak; Andrew van Ruyven; Robert Choquette (cox)	Cuba; Alcides Risco; Francisco Mora; Humberto Dorrego; Luis Alonso; Jesús Rosello (cox)	United States; Tony Brooks; Dave Fellows; Hovey Kemp; Christopher Wood; Bob Jaugstetter (cox)
1979	Cuba; Antonio Riaño; Juan Alfonso; Alfredo Valladares; Francisco Mora; Enrique Carrillo (cox)	Canada; Robert Cherwinski; Douglas Turton; Mel LaForme; Carl Zintel; Miles Cohen (cox)	United States; Frederick Fox; Richard Paczewski; Mark Miller; Steve Christiansen; John Hartigan (cox)
1983	United States; Kurt Bausback; Gregory Springer; Jonathan Phinney; Francis Reininger; John Hartigan (cox)	Brazil; José Ribeiro; Dênis Marinho; Walter Soares; Mauro dos Santos; Nilton Alonço	Canada; Paul Steele; Ron Burak; Nick Toulmin; Blair Horn; Paul Tessier (cox)
1991	Cuba; Unknown rowers	United States; Daemon Anastas; Karl Bjergo; Mike Fillipone; David Krmpotich; Jon Fish (cox)	Canada; Unknown rowers
1995	United States; Tom Murray; James Neil; Chris Swan; Jeffrey Klepacki; Steven Segaloff (cox)	Canada; Henry Hering; Scott Brodie; Jay Bertagnolli; Mike Bryden; Mark Platt	Cuba; Ismael Carbonell; Luis Fuste; Arnaldo Rodríguez; Eusebio Acea; J. Gonzalez Lao

=== Men's eight ===
Games	Gold	Silver	Bronze
1951	Argentina; Angel Coluzzi; Eduardo Lopez; Rubens Nievas; Aberlardo Martinez; Elso Mancini; Luis Merlini; Normando Andueza; Oscar Moreno; Aldo Cesi (cox)	Chile; Vicente Rojas; Alejandro Cavallone; Juan Castelleto; Germin Arenas; Jorge Remis; Enrique Poehmann; Carlos Rojas; Maximiliano Rudolph; Fernando Hucke (cox)	Peru; Atilio Brigneti; Luis Squadrito; Jose Brigneti; Italo Cicirello; Antonio Ruzzeto; Pablo Capurro; Pablo Antola; Jorge Mandrioti; Francisco Colacci (cox)
1955	United States; Bill Knecht; Joseph Toland; Irving Miller; George Dorwart; George Hermann; Herbert Senoff; Charles McIlvaine Jr. Joseph Greipp; Allen Rosenberg (cox)	Argentina; Juan Ecker; Alfredo Czerner; Jorge Schneider; Emilio Czerner; Sezeniauskas; Pezzatti; Monjean; Matel; Gerardo Santos (cox)	Mexico; Pablo Stock; Eduardo Lanzagorta; Ricardo Obert; Eduardo Schad; Jose Alverde; Zellhuber; Canal; Pahl; Stockeer (cox)
1959	United States; James Edmonds; Robert Schoel; Tomas Rouen; Michael Larsen; Edward Montesi; Nelson Miller; James Kries; Charles Mills; Jerry Winkelstein (cox)	Canada; David Anderson; Ian Beardmore; Sohen Biln; John Cartmel; Walter D'Hondt; John Nadden; Glen Mervyn; Peter Robbins; Malcolm Trunbull (cox)	Argentina; Osvaldo Cavagnaro; Pablo Ferrero; Ricardo González; Juan Huber; Juan Pedro Lier; Alario Maire; Héctor Moni; Roberto Parsoglio; Jorge Somlay (cox)
1963	Canada; Daryl Sturdy; Marc Lemieux; Eldon Worobieff; Thomas Gray; Roy McIntosh; Donald Dewar; Rodney Browne; Thomas Stokes; David Overton (cox)	Brazil; Ernesto Vahl; Teodoro Vahl; Ado Steiner; Eric Passig; Rui de Souza; Edison Schmidt; Walfredo Santos; Manuel Silveira; Jobel Silva (cox)	Uruguay; Luis Mayer; Juan Mayer; Efraim Alvarez; Dick Alvarez; Norberto Delgado; Galileo Percovich; Adolfo Escobar; Nelson Corona; Nausen Pagani (cox)
1967	United States; Ian Gardner; David Higgins; Cleve Livingston; Jake Fiechter; Franklin Hobbs; Scott Steketee; Andy Larkin; Curtis Canning; Paul Hoffman (cox)	Canada; Brian McDaniel; Bruce Noble; Brian Johnson; Frederick Chapman; William Chapman; Claus Sjogren; John Richardson; Erick McAvity; Herbert Crawley (cox)	Cuba; Ramón Luperón; Emilio Ruano; Heriberto Martínez; Alfredo Hernández; Jorge López; Mario Tabio; Rafael Guilarte; Santiago Cuesta; Antonio Soriano (cox)
1971	Argentina; Alberto Demiddi; Guillermo Segurado; Hugo Aberastegui; Ricardo Rodríguez; Alfredo Martín; Alejo del Cano; Oscar de Dios; Ignacio Cruz; Raúl Mazerati (cox)	United States; Roy Thompson; Fred Schoch; Peter Sun; Richard Copstead; Greg Miller; Cliff Hurn; John Buse; Bruce Beall; Dwight Phillips (cox)	Canada; Ian Gordon; Rod Irving; Karel Jonker; Robert Cunliffe; James Walker; Edgar Smith; Mike Neary; Robert Advent; Michael Conway (cox)
1975	United States; James Moroney; John Everett; Tim Mickelson; Hugh Stevenson; Mark Umlauf; Alan Shealy; Mike Vespoli; Michael Hess; Bob Jaugstetter (cox)	Cuba; Porfirio Reynoso; Luis Alonso; Francisco Mora; Humberto Dorrego; Alcides Risco; Hermenegildo Palacio; Angel Ramírez; Israel Gorguet; Nestor Pastrana (cox)	Argentina; Gerardo Constantini; Miguel Castro; Ricardo Rodríguez; Guillermo Pedernera; Jose Pechechino; Hugo Aberastegui; Gustavo Lindfelder; Raúl Tettamanti; Jorge Segurado (cox)
1979	United States; Kerry Turner; David Townley; Philip Stekl; Thomas Wooman; Chip Lubsen; Michael Hess; Sean Colgan; Bruce Ibbetson; John Chatzky (cox)	Canada; Gregory Hood; David Orr; Robin Catherall; Robert Hartvickson; Marius Felix; Dave Wilkinson; Frederick Whiters; John Richardson; Michael Conway (cox)	Cuba; Francisco Mora; Alfredo Valladares; Juan Alfonso; Humberto Dorrego; Alcides Risco; Jorge Álvarez; Mario Acosta; Antonio Riaño; Enrique Carrillo (cox)
1983	United States; Daniel Lyons; Brad Smith; Paul Jacobson; Chris Penny; Jonathan Kissick; Jonathan Smith; Dave De Ruff; Michael Cataldo; John Stillings (cox)	Chile; Rodolfo Pereira; Giorgio Vallebuona; Zibor Llanos; Marcelo Rojas; Alejandro Rojas; Víctor Contreras; Mario Castro; Carlos Neyra; Rodrigo Abasolo (cox)	Canada; Tony Zasada; Graham Wilkins; Martin Mai; Tim Bristow; Tim Christian; Dave Ross; John Houlding; Curt Pieckenhagen; Darly Oakley (cox)
1987	United States; Jonathan Kissick; Henry Matthiessen; Kurt Bausback; Chris Huntington; Robert Meyn; Edward Ives; David Anderson; John Strotbeck Jr. Stephen Shellans Jr. (cox)	Brazil; Claudio Tavares; Helder Lima; Dênis Marinho; Flávio de Melo; Mauro Santos; José Almeida; Ángelo Roso Neto; Carlos Bezerra; Nilton Alonço (cox)	Canada; Raymond Collier; Darby Berkhout; Bruce Robertson; Michael Rascher; Ian McKerlich; Scott Drossos; Jamie Shaffer; Trevor Cooper; Ian Malcolm (cox)
1991	Cuba; Ismael Carbonell; Hector Hernandez; Hermes Castellanos; Josvani; Ole; Arnaldo Rodríguez; Lorenzo Diaz; Fidel; Roberto Ojeda (cox)	United States; Meredith Bell; John Brown; Bill Cooper; Martin Crew; Chad Jungbluth; Chris Ludden; Russell McManus; Jason Scott; Alden Zecha	Canada; Unknown rowers
1995	United States; Steven Segaloff; Jeffrey Klepacki; Jamie Koven; Jon Brown; Don Smith; Bob Kaehler; Chip McKibben; Fredric Honebein; Sean Hall	Canada; Ken Kozel; Mark Platt; Jay Bertagnolli; Scott Brodie; Phil Graham; Todd Hallett; Greg Stevenson; Henry Hering; Adam Parfitt	Cuba; Luis Fuste; Ernesto Daudinot; Manuel Cascaret; Hermes Castellanos; Eusebio Acea; R. Rodriguez Laher; Ismael Carbonell; Arnaldo Rodríguez; J. Gonzales Lao
1999	United States; Nicholas Anderson; Dan Protz; Kurt Borcherding; Ted Murphy; David Simon; Phil Henry; James Neil; Ben Holbrook; Tom Murray	Argentina; Diego Aguirregomezcorta; Rubén Knulst; Marcos Morales; Walter Balunek; Fernando Loglen; Horacio Sicilia; Santiago Salinas; Patricio Mouche; Damian Ordás	Cuba; Ismael Carbonell; Ernesto Daudinot; Manuel Cascaret; O. Ramirez Cabrera; Eusebio Acea; Arnaldo Rodríguez; Hermes Castellano; L. Gonzales Cobas; J.C. Gonzalez Lao
2003	United States; John Stillings; Beau Hoopman; Justin Bosley; John Cranston; Christopher Liwski; Paul Daniels; Andrew Brennan; Justin Jones; Dave Fredericks	Canada; Neil Armour; Iain Brambell; Kevin Burt; Chris Davidson; Geoff Hodgson; David Kay; Mike Lewis; Michael Simonson; Dallas Smith	Cuba; Manuel Cascaret; Luis Cruz; Reinier Lartiga; Yoennis Hernández; Yosbel Martínez; Yuleidys Cascaret; Dioglis Abad; Juan Carlos González; Yuleidys Cascaret
2007	United States; Troy Kepper; Chris Callaghan; Gabe Winkler; Dan Beery; Cameron Winklevoss; Sebastian Bea; Patrick O'Dunne; Tyler Winklevoss; Ned Delguercio (C)	Brazil; Renan Castro; Alexandre Ribas; Leandro Tozzo; Gibran Cunha; José Roberto Nascimento; Marcelus dos Santos; Anderson Nocetti; Allan Bitencourt; Nilton Alonço (C)	Argentina; Alan San Martín; Marcelo Walter Bronca; Maximiliano Martínez; Joaquín Iwan; Horacio Sicilia; Diego Martín López; Damian Ordás; Mariano Palermo; Joel Infante (C)
2011	United States; Jason Read; Stephen Kasprzyk; Matthew Wheeler; Joseph Spencer; Michael Gennaro; Robert "Ty" Otto; Blaise Didier; Marcus McElhenney; Derek Johnson	Canada; Peter McClelland; Steven Van Knotsenburg; David Wakulich; Kai Langerfeld; Blake Parsons; Spencer Crowley; Joshua Morris; Benjamin De Wit; Mark Laidlaw	Argentina; Sebastián Fernández; Joaquín Iwan; Rodrigo Murillo; Agustín Silvestro; Sebastián Claus; Diego López; Joel Infante; Mariano Sosa; Ariel Suárez
2015	Canada; Julien Bahain; Martin Barakso; Will Crothers; Will Dean; Mike Evans; Jacob Koudys; Kai Langerfeld; Conlin McCabe; Tim Schrijver	Argentina; Joaquín Iwán; Axel Haack; Osvaldo Suárez; Francisco Esteras; Iván Carino; Rodrigo Murillo; Diego López; Agustín Díaz; Joel Infante	United States; Matthew Mahon; Brendan Harrington; Taylor Brown; Erick Winstead; David Eick; Kyle Peabody; Nareg Guregian; Kean Johnson; Samuel Ojserkis
2019	Argentina; Iván Carino; Francisco Esteras; Axel Haack; Tomás Herrera; Joel Infante; Rodrigo Murillo; Joel Romero; Agustín Scenna; Ariel Suárez	Chile; César Abaroa; Alfredo Abraham; Ignacio Abraham; Selim Echeverría; Christopher Kalleg; Francisco Lapostol; Antonia Liewald; Nelson Martínez; Óscar Vásquez	Cuba; Carlos Ajete; Reidy Cardona; Eduardo González; Boris Guerra; Yoelvis Hernández; Adrián Oquendo; Jorge Patterson; Jesús Rodríguez; Yadian Rodríguez
2023	Cuba; Roberto Paz; Luis León; Henry Heredia; Francisco Romero; Andrey Barnet; Leduar Suárez; Carlos Ajete; Reidy Cardona; Juan Carlos González	Uruguay; Bruno Cetraro; Felipe Klüver; Leandro Rodas; Mauricio López; Marcos Sarraute; Newton Seawright; Leandro Slavagno; Martín Zocalo; Romina Cetraro	Chile; Oscar Vásquez; Brahim Alvayay; Marcelo Poo; Francisco Lapostol; Alfredo Abraham; Ignacio Abraham; Nahuel Reyes; Andoni Habash; Isidora Soto

=== Men's lightweight single sculls ===
Games	Gold	Silver	Bronze
1987	Sergio Fernández; Argentina	Juan Félix; Puerto Rico	Don Dickison; Canada
1991	Luis Miguel García; Mexico	Osmani Martín; Cuba	Maximiliano Hayes; Argentina
1995	Osmani Martín; Cuba	Adam Oliver; El Salvador	James Brambel; Canada
1999	William J. Belden; United States	Osmani Martín; Cuba	Javier Godoy; Chile

=== Men's lightweight double sculls ===
Games	Gold	Silver	Bronze
1987	Canada; Brian Thome; John Murphy	Argentina; Jorge Lamo; Federico Querín	United States; Robert Dreher; Michael Dreher
1991	Cuba; Aleman; Alexis Arias	Argentina; Jorge Lamo; Federico Querín	United States; Peter Borowski; Mike Hindery
1995	United States; Barry Klein; Christopher Schulten	Cuba; Raúl León; Alexis Arias	Canada; James Brambell; Reuben Thompson
1999	Argentina; Sebastián Massa; Ulf Lienhard	Canada; Andrew Bordon; Kyle Warrington	Cuba; Armando Arrechavaleta; Raúl León
2003	Cuba; Yunior Pérez; Armando Arrechavaleta	Brazil; José Sobral Júnior; Thiago Gomes	Argentina; Sebastián Massa; Ulf Lienhard
2007	Cuba; Eider Batista; Yunior Pérez	United States; Rich Montgomery; Andrew Liverman	Chile; Félipe Leal; Miguel Cerda
2011	Mexico; Alan Armenta; Gerardo Sanchez	Cuba; Yunior Pérez; Eider Batista	Canada; Travis King; Terence McKall
2015	Mexico; Alan Armenta; Alexis López	United States; Colin Ethridge; Austin Meyer	Cuba; Raul Hernandez; Liosbel Hernández
2019	Mexico; Alan Armenta; Alexis López	Argentina; Alejandro Colomino; Carlo Lauro Gracia	Chile; César Abaroa; Eber Sanhueza
2023	Mexico; Miguel Carballo; Alexis López	Chile; César Abaroa; Eber Sanhueza	Argentina; Alejandro Colomino; Pedro Dickson

=== Men's lightweight quadruple sculls ===
Games	Gold	Silver	Bronze
1991	Cuba; Unknown rowers	United States; Pieter Beckmann; Neil Fitch; Graham Durham; Barry Klein	Mexico; Unknown rowers
1995	Cuba; Ezequiel Lyon; Raúl León; Alexis Arias; Osmani Martín	United States; William Carlucci; Mike Dreher; Ed Hewitt; Jeff Pfaendtner	Mexico; Arturo Camargo; Martin Plettner; Edgar Martin; Dante Ruiz
1999	Argentina; Ariel Zeller; Mario Cejas; Ulf Lienhard; Sebastián Massa	Cuba; Ezequiel Lyon; Raúl León; Osmani Martín; Armando Arrechavaleta	United States; Bill Belden Jr. Cooper Wessells; Eric Davis; Doug Sanders
2003	Cuba; Armando Arrechavaleta; Eider Batista; Yosvel Iglesias; Yunior Pérez	Argentina; Diego Wehrendt; Jose Czsy; Ulf Lienhard; Sebastián Massa	Brazil; Gustavo Santos; Joao Borges; Ronaldo Vargas; Rui Valle

=== Men's lightweight coxless pairs ===
Games	Gold	Silver	Bronze
1991	Mexico; Amezcua; Jurado	Cuba; Arrechavalta; Hernandez	United States; Stephen Gantz; Marvin Guiles
1995	United States; Andy Finch; Chris Kerber	Canada; Robert Fontaine; Jeffrey Lay	Mexico; F. Lopez Velasco; I. Lopez Velazco

=== Men's lightweight coxless four ===
Games	Gold	Silver	Bronze
1987	United States; Dan McGill; Russel Lane; Donald Tower; Eric Rosow	Mexico; Luis Amezcua; Alfonso Castro; Ricardo Garcia; Horacio Tendilla	Canada; Scott Anderson; Thomas Kent; Wayne MacFarlane; Chris Flood
1991	United States; Rob Canavan; Chris Kerber; Kane Larin; Al Stefan	Cuba; Unknown rowers	Guatemala; Unknown rowers
1995	United States; Kane Larin; John Velyvis; Greg Klingsporn; Jonathan Moss	Canada; Jeffrey Lay; Robert Fontaine; Geoff Johns; Chris Davidson	Guatemala; Victor Zacarias Resuleu; David Kamber Wilson; Rudy Motta; Herbert Grau
1999	United States; Marc Schneider; Tom Auth; Paul Teti; William Carlucci	Mexico; Luis Prado; Arturo Camargo; Edgar Martin; Rómulo Bouzas	Chile; Daniel Suárez; Javier Godoy; Christián Yantani; Miguel Cerda
2003	Chile; Christián Yantani; Félipe Leal; Javier Godoy; Miguel Cerda	Canada; Chris Davidson; Iain Brambell; Mike Lewis; Mike Simonson	Cuba; Juan Bell; Yunian Cabrera; Yoslay Sarduy; Liosbel Hernández
2007	Canada; Adam Reynolds; Andrew Borden; John Haver; Paul Amesbury	United States; Andrew Bolton; Bjorn Larsen; Matthew Smith; Simon Carcagno	Cuba; Eider Batista; Dixan Massip; Iran González; Yunior Pérez
2011	Cuba; Wilber Turro; Liosbel Hernández; Liosmel Ramos; Manuel Suárez	Argentina; Nicolai Fernández; Diego Gallina; Carlo Lauro; Pablo Mahnic	Chile; Félipe Leal; Fernando Miralles; Rodrigo Muñoz; Fabian Oyarzun
2015	Canada; Maxwell Lattimer; Brendan Hodge; Nicolas Pratt; Eric Woelfl	United States; Robin Prendes; Peter Gibson; Andrew Weiland; Matthew O'Donoghue	Chile; Andres Oyarzun; Luis Saumann Salas; Felipe Cárdenas; Bernardo Guerrero
2019	Chile; Felipe Cárdenas; Roberto Liewald; Fabián Oyarzún; Felipe Oyarzún	Mexico; Angy Canul; Alexis López; Rafael Mejía; Marco Velázquez	Cuba; Alexei Carballosa; Osvaldo Pérez; Ennier Tamayo; Yhoan Uribarri

=== Men's lightweight eights ===
Games	Gold	Silver	Bronze
1995	United States; Peter Cipollone; Steve Gantz; John Velyvis; David Collins; Steve Robinson; Jonathan Moss; Ed Grose; Tom Grace	Argentina; Gabriel Scortiquini; Hernán Legizamón	Cuba; Unknown rowers

=== Women's single sculls ===
Games	Gold	Silver	Bronze
1983	Christine Ernst; United States	María Fernanda de la Fuente; Mexico	Maureen Grace; Canada
1987	Silken Laumann; Canada	Gretchen Weimer; United States	Martha García; Mexico
1991	Cynthia Ryder; United States	Martha García; Mexico	Yaquelín Hernández; Cuba
1995	Silken Laumann; Canada	Ruth Davidon; United States	María Garisoain; Argentina
1999	Marnie McBean; Canada	Leslie Burns-Rawley; United States	Manuela González; Cuba
2003	Mayra González; Cuba	Fiona Milne; Canada	Caroline Bishop; United States
2007	Mayra González; Cuba	Gabriela Best; Argentina	Camila Vargas; El Salvador
2011	Margot Shumway; United States	Gabriela Best; Argentina	Isolda Penney; Canada
2015	Carling Zeeman; Canada	Katherine McFetridge; United States	Soraya Jadué; Chile
2019	Jessica Sevick; Canada	Felice Chow; Trinidad and Tobago	Soraya Jadué; Chile
2023	Kenia Lechuga; Mexico	Beatriz Tavares; Brazil	Nicole Martinez; Paraguay

=== Women's double sculls ===
Games	Gold	Silver	Bronze
1983	United States; Anne Marden; Monica Havelka	Canada; Marie Guadet; Heather Hattin	Mexico; Veronika Schreiber; Ana Gamble
1987	Mexico; Martha García; Ana Gamble	United States; Jennie Marshall; Holly Kays	Canada; Karen Ashford; Connie Delise
1991	Mexico; Garcia; Lopez	United States; Molly Hoyle; Linda Muri	Cuba; Hernandez; Ortiz
1995	Canada; Marnie McBean; Diane O'Grady	United States; Michelle Knox; Dré Thies	Cuba; M. Hernandez; Y. Ortiz Ruiz
1999	Canada; Laryssa Biesenthal; Jenn Browett	United States; Olwen Huxley; Karin Hughes	Mexico; Manuela González; Maurenis Hernández
2003	Canada; Marilyn Taylor; Stacey Norwood	United States; Catherine Humblet; Kathryn Madigan	Chile; María Orellana; Soraya Jadué
2007	United States; Sarah Trowbridge; Margaret Matia	Canada; Peggy Hyslop; Cristin McCarty	Cuba; Yursleydis Venet; Mayra González
2011	Cuba; Yariulvis Cobas; Aimee Hernandez	United States; Megan Walsh; Catherine Reddick	Canada; Barbara McCord; Audra Vair
2015	Canada; Kerry Maher-Shaffer; Antje von Seydlitz	United States; Nicole Ritchie; Lindsay Meyer	Cuba; Aimee Hernandez; Yariulvis Cobas
2019	Cuba; Yariulvis Cobas; Aimeé Hernández	United States; Margaret Fellows; Julia Lonchar	Argentina; Milka Kraljev; Oriana Ruiz
2023	United States; Madeleine Focht; Veronica Nicacio	Chile; Melita Abraham; Antonia Abraham	Canada; Alizée Brien; Shaye de Paiva

=== Women's quadruple sculls ===
Games	Gold	Silver	Bronze
1991	United States; Karen Carpenter; Betsy Kimmel; Michelle Knox; Susan Tietjen	Cuba; Unknown rowers	Mexico; Unknown rowers
1995	Canada; Silken Laumann; Wendy Wiebe; Diane O'Grady; Marnie McBean	Cuba; Y. Ortiz Ruiz; M. Gonzalez; O. Martinez; M. Hernandez	United States; Ruth Davidon; Cathy Symon; Julia Chilicki; Lindsay Burns
2007	Canada; Nathalie Maurer; Zoë Hoskins; Peggy Hyslop; Cristin McCarty	United States; Julie Nichols; Reilly Dampeer; Sarah Trowbridge; Margaret Matia	Argentina; Carolina Schiffmacher; María Laura Abalo; Gabriela Best; Lucia Palermo
2011	Argentina; María Laura Abalo; Gabriela Best; Milka Kraljev; María Clara Rohner	Canada; Melanie Kok; Barbara McCord; Audra Vair; Isolda Penney	United States; Megan Walsh; Michelle Sechser; Catherine Reddick; Chelsea Smith
2015	Canada; Kate Goodfellow; Kerry Maher-Shaffer; Carling Zeeman; Antje von Seydlitz	United States; Sarah Giancola; Lindsay Meyer; Nicole Ritchie; Victoria Burke	Argentina; Karina Wilvers; María Laura Abalo; Milka Kraljev; María Clara Rohner
2019	Chile; Melita Abraham; Antonia Abraham; Soraya Jadué; Isidora Niemeyer	Cuba; Yariulvis Cobas; Marelis González; Aimeé Hernández; Rayma Ortíz	United States; Margaret Fellows; Solveig Imsdahl; Julia Lonchar; Keara Twist
2023	United States; Grace Joyce; Veronica Nicacio; Madeleine Focht; Katherine Horvat	Chile; Christina Hostetter; Victoria Hostetter; Melita Abraham; Antonia Abraham	Canada; Kendra Hartley; Parker Illingworth; Alizée Brien; Shaye de Paiva

=== Women's coxless pair ===
Games	Gold	Silver	Bronze
1987	Canada; Kirsten Barnes; Kathleen Heddle	United States; Alice Henderson; Sandy Jansen	Cuba; Magdalena Rodriguez; Jaquelin Hernandez
1991	United States; Liz Behrens; Marci Porter	Canada; Shannon Crawford; Julie Jesperson	Cuba; Glez; Rodriguez
1995	United States; Mary McCagg; Elizabeth McCagg	Cuba; M. Gonzalez; D. Rodriguez	Argentina; Julieta Ramírez; C. Turcitu
2007	Chile; Soraya Jadué; María José Orellana	Canada; Zoë Hoskins; Nathalie Maurer	United States; Ruth Stiver; Jennifer Reck
2011	Argentina; María Laura Abalo; Gabriela Best	United States; Monica George; Megan Smith	Canada; Sarah Bonikowsky; Sandra Kisil
2015	United States; Emily Huelskamp; Molly Bruggeman	Chile; Melita Abraham; Antonia Abraham	Canada; Rosie DeBoef; Kristin Bauder
2019	Chile; Melita Abraham; Antonia Abraham	Canada; Jessie Loutit; Larissa Werbicki	Mexico; Maite Arrillaga; Fernanda Ceballos
2023	United States; Hannah Paynter; Isabela Darvin	Canada; Olivia McMurray; Abigail Dent	Paraguay; Nicole Martinez; Alejandra Alonso

=== Women's coxless four ===
Games	Gold	Silver	Bronze
1991	Canada; Shannon Crawford; Julie Jespersen-Platt; Danita Sepp; Andrea Walsh	United States; Bonnie Baker; Sue Charles; Catriona Fallon; Katie Young	Cuba; Unknown rowers
2023	Chile; Magdalena Nannig; Victoria Hostetter; Melita Abraham; Antonia Abraham	United States; Cristina Pretto; Isabela Darvin; Lauren Miller; Hannah Paynter	Mexico; Devanih Plata; María Sheccid García; Mildred Mercado; Maite Arrillaga

=== Women's eight ===
Games	Gold	Silver	Bronze
2023	Canada; Kendra Hartley; Olivia McMurray; Alizée Brien; Parker Illingworth; Abby Speirs; Shaye De Paiva; Abigail Dent; Leia Till; Kristen Kit	United States; Cristina Pretto; Grace Joyce; Veronica Nicacio; Madeleine Focht; Katherine Horvat; Isabela Darvin; Lauren Miller; Hannah Paynter; Colette Lucas-Conwell	Chile; Christina Hostetter; Antonia Liewald; Antonia Hostetter; Victoria Hostetter; Antonia Abraham; Melita Abraham; Magdalena Nannig; Isidora Niemeyer; Isis Correa

=== Women's lightweight single sculls ===
Games	Gold	Silver	Bronze
1987	Michele Murphy; Canada	Merri Lisa Trigilo; United States	Verónica Schreiber; Mexico
1991	Peggy Johnston; United States	Lourdes Montoya; Mexico	María Garisoain; Argentina
1995	María Garisoain; Argentina	Wendy Wiebe; Canada	Andrea Boltz; Mexico
1999	María Garisoain; Argentina	Tracy Duncan; Canada	Melissa Obidinski; United States
2003	Ismaray Marrero; Cuba	Gen Meredith; Canada	Melissa Rice; United States
2011	Jennifer Goldsack; United States	Fabiana Beltrame; Brazil	Yaima Velázquez; Cuba
2015	Mary Jones; United States	Fabiana Beltrame; Brazil	Lucia Palermo; Argentina
2019	Kenia Lechuga; Mexico	Milka Kraljev; Argentina	Milena Venega; Cuba

=== Women's lightweight double sculls ===
Games	Gold	Silver	Bronze
1987	United States; Peggy Johnston; Susan Cooper	Canada; Marlene van der Horst; Siobhan Herron	Mexico; Lourdes Montoya; Veronika Schreiber
1995	Argentina; Patricia Conte; Ana Urbano	United States; Barbara Spitz; Elizabeth Gordon	Mexico; Lourdes Montoya; Ana Sofía Soberanes
1999	Argentina; Patricia Conte; Ana Urbano	United States; Melissa Obidinski; Julie Ann McCleery	Canada; Katrina Scott; Nathalie Benzing
2003	Canada; Gen Meredith; Fiona Milne	Cuba; Dailin Taset; Marlenis Mesa	United States; Anne Finke; Sarah Hirst
2007	Cuba; Yaima Velázquez; Ismaray Marrero	Mexico; Analicia Ramírez; Lila Pérez-Rul	Canada; Amber Cuthberton; Camille Brillon
2011	Mexico; Analicia Ramirez; Lila Pérez-Rul	Cuba; Yaima Velázquez; Yoslaine Domínguez	United States; Michelle Sechser; Chelsea Smith
2015	Canada; Liz Fenje; Kate Sauks	Cuba; Yislena Hernández; Licet Hernández	United States; Sara Giancola; Victoria Burke
2019	Canada; Katherine Haber; Jaclyn Stelmaszyk	Chile; Isidora Niemeyer; Yoselyn Cárcamo	Cuba; Rosana Serrano; Milena Venega
2023	Chile; Antonia Liewald; Isidora Niemeyer	United States; Elizabeth Martin; Mary Wilson	Argentina; Sonia Baluzzo; Evelyn Silvestro

=== Women's lightweight coxless pair ===
Games	Gold	Silver	Bronze
1987	United States; Hildegard Emslander; Cola Parker	Canada; Karen Smyte; Diane Sinnige	Cuba; Walkiria Portelles; Lourdes Rodriguez
1991	Canada; Nori Doobenen; Laurie Featherstone	United States; Marjorie Riemer; Vikki Scott	Cuba; Pena; Portelles
1995	United States; Ellen Minzner; Christine Smith	Mexico; E. Diez Gonzalez; A. Diez Gonzalez	Argentina; I. Vattovez; R. Andreotti
1999	Canada; Theresa Luke; Emma Robinson	United States; Karen Kraft; Missy Ryan	Cuba; Manuela González; O. Martínez

=== Women's lightweight quadruple sculls ===
Games	Gold	Silver	Bronze
1999	Argentina; Patricia Conte; Ana Urbano; Marisa Peguri; María Garisoain	United States; Marny Jaastad; Grace Mowery; Suzanne Walther; Cassandra Cunningham	Canada; Katrina Scott; Nathalie Benzing; Tracy Duncan; Renata Troc
2003	Cuba; Dailin Taset; Gerna Diaz; Ismaray Marrero; Marlenis Mesa	United States; Anne Finke; Jennifer Edwards; Sarah Hirst; Wendy Campanella	Mexico; Aline Olvera; Ana Valencia; Claudia Montiel; Gabriela Huerta

=== Mixed eight ===
Games	Gold	Silver	Bronze
2023	United States; Cristina Pretto; Isabella Darvin; Lauren Miller; Hannah Paynter; James Plihal; Mark Couwenhoven; Ezra Carlson; Alexander Hedge; Colette Lucas-Conwell	Chile; Christina Hostetter; Victoria Hostetter; Oscar Vásquez; Ignacio Abraham; Antonia Abraham; Melita Abraham; Alfredo Abraham; Francisco Lapostol; Isidora Soto	Cuba; Ana Jiménez; Milena Venega; Andrey Barnet; Leduar Suárez; Natalie Morales; Yariulvis Cobas; Carlos Ajete; Reidy Cardona; Juan Carlos González
