= Rowing at the 1991 Pan American Games =

At the 1991 Pan American Games there were thirteen rowing events for men and seven for women. Events were hosted by the Escuela nacional de remo y canotaje at Albufera de Pasa Boca near Caimito, West of Havana, Cuba. Gold medals were won by teams from Canada, Cuba, Mexico and the United States.

== Men's events ==
Event	Gold	Silver	Bronze
Single sculls	Joaquín Gómez; Mexico	Sergio Fernández; Argentina	Todd Hallett; Canada
Double sculls	Cuba; Leonides Samé; Orlando Ramirez	Canada; David Dickinson; Don Dickison	Argentina; Max Holdo; Guillermo Pfaab
Lightweight Single sculls	Miguel García; Mexico	Osmani Martín; Cuba	Maximiliano Hayes; Argentina
Lightweight double sculls	Cuba; Reynaldo Alemán; Alexis Arias	Argentina; Federico Querin; Jorge Lamo	United States; Michael Hindery; Peter Borowski
Lightweight Coxless Pairs	Mexico; Luis Amezcua; Manuel Jurado	Cuba; Juan Hernandez Diaz; Armando Arechavaleta	United States; Marvin Guiles; Stephen Gantz
Quadruple sculls	Cuba; Wilfredo Suárez; Orlando Ramirez; Alejandro Torres; Leonides Samé	United States; Matthew Horvat; Andrew Morrow; James Moulton; Frank Rowe	Mexico; Renato Chavez; Luis Miguel Garcia; Alvaro Rodriguez; Eduardo Arrillaga
Coxless pair	Cuba; Ismael Carbonell; Hermes Castellanos	Canada; Steve Frisch; Michael Forgeron	Brazil; Cláudio Tavares; Carlos de Almeida
Coxed pair	Cuba; Ihosvani Peña; Arnaldo Rodriguez	Argentina; Marcelo Pieretti; Gustavo Pacheco	Brazil; Marcos Arantes; Oswaldo Kuster Neto
Coxless four	Cuba; Ihosvani Peña; Hermes Castellanos; Ismael Carbonell; Arnaldo Rodriguez	United States; William Serad; William Porter; Shane Petersen; Raoul Rodriguez	Canada; Michael Koski; Christopher Spooner; Jon Siebert; Greg Stevenson
Coxed four	Cuba; Ihosvani Peña; Hermes Castellanos; Ismael Carbonell; Arnaldo Rodriguez	United States; Daemon Anastas; Dave Krmpotich; Michael Filippone; Karl Bjergo	Canada; Ian Swan; David Miege; Andrew Lamont; David Brown
Lightweight quadruple sculls	Cuba; Ezequiel Lyon; Osmani Martín; Reynaldo Alemán; Alexis Arias	United States; Pieter Beckman; Barry Klein; Neil Fitch; Graham Duncan	Mexico; Esteban de Mucha; Pedro Sánchez; Juan Chávez; Ricardo Acosta
Lightweight coxless four	United States; Kane Larin; Christopher Kerber; Robert Canavan; Albert Stefan	Cuba; Armando Arechavaleta; Arnaldo Poll; Raúl León	Guatemala; Thomas Jelkmann; Carlos Ramírez; Victor Zacarias; Mario Ordóñez
Coxed eight	Cuba; Ridel Dominguez; Ihosvani Peña; Ismael Carbonell; Olex Chaviano; Arnaldo Rodriguez; Lorenzo Diaz; Arnaldo Suares; Hermes Castellanos; Roberto Ojeda	United States; Martin Crew; Chad Jungbluth; William Cooper; Christopher Ludden; Russell McManus; Jason Scott; Jon Brown; Meredith Bell; Alden Zecha	Canada; Michael Koski; Jon Siebert; Steve Frisch; Ian Swan; Andrew Lamont; Michael Forgeron; David Miege; David Brown; Bruce Boulter

== Women's events ==
Event	Gold	Silver	Bronze
Single sculls	Cynthia Ryder; United States	Martha García; Mexico	Yaquelín Hernández; Cuba
Double sculls	Mexico; Iliana Lopez; Martha García	United States; Molly Hoyle; Linda Muri	Cuba; Maurenis Hernández; Yamel Ortiz
Quadruple sculls	United States; Betsy Kimmel; Michelle Knox; Karen Carpenter; Susan Tietjen	Cuba; Maurenis Hernández; Yamel Ortiz; Tatiana Mederos; Yaquelín Hernández	Mexico; Lourdes Montoya; Martha García; Iliana Lopez; Nicolle Larc
Lightweight Single sculls	Peggy Johnston; United States	Lourdes Montoya; Mexico	María Garisoain; Argentina
Coxless pair	United States; Marci Porter; Elizabeth Behrens	Canada; Shannon Crawford; Julie Jespersen	Cuba; Magdalena Rodriguez; Maira Glez
Lightweight coxless pair	Canada; Nori Doobenen; Laurie Featherstone	United States; Victoria Scott; Marjorie Riemer	Cuba; Walkiria Portelles; Maidelín Peña
Coxless four	Canada; Danita Rae Sepp; Andrea Walsh; Shannon Crawford; Julie Jespersen	United States; Bonnie Baker; Kathryn Young; Susan Charles; Catriona Fallon	Cuba; Maria Espinosa; Maira Glez; Regla Ocampo; Magdalena Rodriguez

== Medal table ==
Place	Nation	Gold medal	Silver medal	Bronze medal	Total
1	Cuba	9	4	5	18
2	United States	5	8	2	15
3	Mexico	4	2	3	9
4	Canada	2	3	4	9
5	Argentina	0	3	3	6
6	Brazil	0	0	2	2
7	Guatemala	0	0	1	1
Total		20	20	20	60
