= Armando Arrechavaleta =

Cuban rower (born 1975)

Personal information
- Full name: Armando Arrechavaleta Carrera
- Born: 8 February 1975 (age 51) Corralillo, Cuba
- Height: 182 cm (6 ft 0 in)
- Weight: 70 kg (154 lb)

Sport
- Sport: Rowing
Medal record
Men's rowing
Representing Cuba
Pan American Games
Gold medal – first place	2003 Santo Domingo	Lwt double sculls
Gold medal – first place	2003 Santo Domingo	Lwt quadruple sculls
Silver medal – second place	1991 Havana	Lwt coxless pairs
Silver medal – second place	1991 Havana	Lwt coxless fours
Silver medal – second place	1999 Winnipeg	Lwt quadruple sculls
Bronze medal – third place	1995 Mar del Plata	Lwt eights
Bronze medal – third place	1999 Winnipeg	Lwt double sculls

Armando Arrechavaleta Carrera (Note: In this Spanish name, the first or paternal surname is Arrechavaleta and the second or maternal family name is Carrera.) (born 8 February 1975) is a Cuban rower. He competed in the men's lightweight double sculls event at the 2004 Summer Olympics.
