= Lourdes Montoya =

Mexican rower (born 1966)

Personal information
- Born: 2 March 1966 (age 60) Mexico City, Mexico

Sport
- Sport: Rowing
Medal record
Representing Mexico
Pan American Games
Silver medal – second place	1991 Havana	Lwt single sculls
Bronze medal – third place	1987 Indianapolis	Lwt double sculls
Bronze medal – third place	1991 Havana	Quadruple sculls
Bronze medal – third place	1995 Mar del Plata	Lwt double sculls

María de Lourdes Montoya Castorena (born 2 March 1966) is a Mexican rower. She competed at the 1992 Summer Olympics and the 2000 Summer Olympics.
