= Sergio Fernández González (rower) =

Argentine rower

Personal information
- Born: 27 March 1967 (age 59) Buenos Aires, Argentina
Medal record
Men's rowing
Representing Argentina
World Rowing Championships
Bronze medal – third place	1995 Tampere	M4x
Pan American Games
Gold medal – first place	1987 Indianapolis	Lw single sculls
Gold medal – first place	1995 Mar del Plata	Single sculls
Gold medal – first place	1995 Mar del Plata	Quadruple sculls
Silver medal – second place	1991 Havana	Single sculls

Sergio Fernández González (born 27 March 1967) is an Argentine former rower. Fernández González competed at four Olympic Games from 1988 until 2000.
