= Rowing at the 1999 Pan American Games =

Nine men's and five women's rowing events took place at the 1999 Pan American Games in Canada. The gold medals were won by rowers from the United States, Canada and Argentina.

== Men's events ==
Event	Gold	Silver	Bronze
Single sculls	Derek Porter; Canada	Aquil Abdullah; United States	Yoennis Hernández; Cuba
Coxless pair	Argentina; Damian Ordás; Walter Daniel Balunek	Brazil; Alexandre Soares; Gibran Cunha	Canada; Phil Graham; Kevin White
Coxless four	Argentina; Guillermo Pfaab; Horacio Sicilia; Walter Balunek; Damian Ordás	United States; Mike Callahan; Jordan Irving; Martin Crotty; Jon Brown	Canada; Phil Graham; Kevin White; Ken Kozel; Andrew Hoskins
Eight	United States; Nicholas Anderson; Dan Protz; Kurt Borcherding; Ted Murphy; David Simon; Phil Henry; James Neil; Ben Holbrook; Tom Murray	Argentina; Diego Aguirregomezcorta; Rubén Knulst; Marcos Morales; Walter Balunek; Fernando Loglen; Horacio Sicilia; Santiago Salinas; Patricio Mouche; Damian Ordás	Cuba; Ismael Carbonell; Ernesto Daudinot; Manuel Cascaret; O. Ramirez Cabrera; Eusebio Acea; Arnaldo Rodríguez; Hermes Castellano; L. Gonzales Cobas; J.C. Gonzalez Lao
Lightweight single sculls	William J. Belden; United States	Martín Hernández; Cuba	Javier Godoy; Chile
Lightweight double sculls	Argentina; Sebastián Rodrigo Massa; Ulf Lienhard	Canada; Andrew Bordon; Kyle Warrington	Cuba; Armando Arrechavaleta Carrera; Raúl León
Lightweight quadruple sculls	Argentina; Ariel Zeller; Mario Cejas; Ulf Lienhard; Sebastián Massa	Cuba; Ezequiel Lyon; Raúl León; Osmani Martín; Armando Arrechavaleta	United States; William J. Belden; Cooper Wessells; Eric Davis; Doug Sanders
Lightweight coxless four	United States; Marc Schneider; Tom Auth; Paul Teti; William Carlucci	Mexico; Luis Prado; Arturo Camargo; Edgar Martin; Rómulo Bouzas	Chile; Daniel Suárez; Javier Godoy; Christián Yantani; Miguel Cerda

== Women's events ==
Event	Gold	Silver	Bronze
Single sculls	Marnie McBean; Canada	Leslie Burns-Rawley; United States	Manuela González; Cuba
Double sculls	Canada; Laryssa Biesenthal; Jenn Browett	United States; Olwen Huxley; Karin Hughes	Mexico; Manuela González; Maurenis Hernández
Lightweight single sculls	María Garisoain; Argentina	Tracy Duncan; Canada	Melissa Obidinski; United States
Lightweight double sculls	Argentina; Patricia Conte; Elina de Lourdes Urbano	United States; Melissa Obidinski; Julie Ann McCleery	Canada; Katrina Scott; Nathalie Benzing
Lightweight coxless pairs	Canada; Theresa Luke; Emma Robinson	United States; Karen Kraft; Mary Ryan	Cuba; Manuela González; O. Martínez
Lightweight quadruple sculls	Argentina; Patricia Conte; Ana Urbano; Marisa Peguri; María Garisoain	United States; Marny Jaastad; Grace Mowery; Suzanne Walther; Cassandra Cunningham	Canada; Katrina Scott; Nathalie Benzing; Tracy Duncan; Renata Troc

== Medal table ==
Place	Nation	Gold medal	Silver medal	Bronze medal	Total
1	Argentina	7	1	0	8
2	Canada	4	2	4	10
3	United States	3	7	2	12
4	Cuba	0	2	6	8
5	Brazil	0	1	0	1
6	Mexico	0	1	0	1
7	Chile	0	0	2	2
Total		14	14	14	42
