= Tim Mickelson =

American rower (1948–2017)

Personal information
- Full name: Timothy Carl Mickelson
- Born: November 12, 1948 Deerfield, Wisconsin, U.S.
- Died: August 30, 2017 (aged 68) Woodinville, Washington, U.S.
Medal record
Men's rowing
Representing United States
Olympic Games
Silver medal – second place	1972 Munich	Eight
World Rowing Championships
Gold medal – first place	1974 Lucerne	Eight
Pan American Games
Gold medal – first place	1975 Mexico City	Eight

Timothy Carl Mickelson (November 12, 1948 – August 30, 2017) was an American medical electronics executive and rower who competed and won medals in the 1972 Summer Olympics, the 1974 World Rowing Championships, as well as the 1975 Pan American Games.

He was a six-year member of the US rowing team. In 1972 he rowed #5 in the US 8+ which placed second at the 1972 Summer Olympics in Munich, Germany, and in 1974 he rowed bow in the US 8+ which won the 1974 World Rowing Championships on the Rotsee in Lucerne, Switzerland. In 1975 he was a member of the US 8+ which placed first in the 1975 Pan American Games.

He was born in Deerfield, Wisconsin.

Mickelson earned a degree in electrical engineering from the University of Wisconsin in Madison. Upon graduation, he served two years in the Army, stationed at Walter Reed Army Medical Center in Washington, DC where he worked as an environmental engineer. Following his discharge, he pursued a master's degree in biomedical engineering at Dartmouth College and a PhD in exercise physiology at Ohio University.

His career began in 1980 as a product manager at Marquette Electronics in Milwaukee, Wisconsin, where worked his way up to become the President and Chief Operating Officer of the company. After leaving Marquette Electronics in 1998, he moved to Seattle, WA to serve as CEO of ATL/Philips Medical – Ultrasound division until his retirement in 2007.

On August 30, 2017, he died of amyotrophic lateral sclerosis at his home outside Seattle, Washington at the age of 68.
