= Arnaldo Rodríguez =

Cuban rower

Personal information
- Full name: Arnaldo Rodríguez Silva
- Born: 11 August 1964 (age 61) San Juan y Martínez, Cuba

Sport
- Sport: Rowing
Medal record
Men's rowing
Representing Cuba
Pan American Games
| Gold medal – first place | 1987 Indianapolis | Coxless four |
| Gold medal – first place | 1995 Mar del Plata | Coxed pair |
| Bronze medal – third place | 1995 Mar del Plata | Coxless four |
| Bronze medal – third place | 1995 Mar del Plata | Coxed four |
| Bronze medal – third place | 1995 Mar del Plata | Eight |
| Bronze medal – third place | 1999 Winnipeg | Eight |

Arnaldo Rodríguez Silva (Note: In this Spanish name, the first or paternal surname is Rodríguez and the second or maternal family name is Silva.) (born 11 August 1964) is a Cuban former rower. He competed in the men's coxed pair event at the 1992 Summer Olympics.
