= Rubén Knulst =

Argentine rower (born 1973)

Personal information
- Full name: Rubén Adrian Knulst
- Born: 5 January 1973 (age 53) Zárate, Argentina

Sport
- Sport: Rowing
Medal record
Men's rowing
Representing Argentina
Pan American Games
Gold medal – first place	1995 Mar del Plata	Double sculls
Silver medal – second place	1999 Winnipeg	Eight

Rubén Adrian Knulst (born 5 January 1973) is an Argentine former rower. He competed in the men's quadruple sculls event at the 1996 Summer Olympics.
