= Ana Urbano =

Argentine rower

Personal information
- Full name: Elina de Lourdes Urbano
- Born: 21 February 1964 (age 62) Mendoza, Argentina

Sport
- Sport: Rowing
Medal record
Women's rowing
Representing Argentina
Pan American Games
Gold medal – first place	1995 Mar del Plata	Lwt double sculls
Gold medal – first place	1999 Winnipeg	Lwt double sculls
Gold medal – first place	1999 Winnipeg	Lwt quadruple sculls

Elina de Lourdes Urbano (born 21 February 1964), known as Ana Urbano, is an Argentine former rower. She competed in the women's single sculls event at the 1996 Summer Olympics. She also won medals in athletics and triathlon, which included national titles in the heptathlon in 1980 and 1984.
