= Cláudio Tavares (rower) =

Brazilian rower

Personal information
- Born: 5 February 1964 (age 62) Niterói, Rio de Janeiro, Brazil

Sport
- Sport: Rowing
Medal record
Representing Brazil
Pan American Games
Silver medal – second place	1987 Indianapolis	Eights
Bronze medal – third place	1991 Havana	Coxless pairs
Bronze medal – third place	1995 Mar del Plata	Coxless pairs

Cláudio Mello Tavares (born 5 February 1964) is a Brazilian rower. He competed in the men's coxed pair event at the 1992 Summer Olympics.
