= Paulo Carvalho =

Paulo Carvalho may refer to:

- Paulo Carvalho (boxer)
- Paulo Carvalho (rower)

== See also ==
- Paulo de Carvalho, Portuguese singer
