= Cascaret =

Cascaret is a surname. Notable people with the surname include:

- Raúl Cascaret (1962–1995), Cuban wrestler
- Yuleidys Cascaret (born 1978), Cuban rower
