= Daniel Scuri =

Argentine rower

Personal information
- Nationality: Argentine
- Born: 28 August 1962 (age 63)

Sport
- Sport: Rowing
Medal record
Representing Argentina
Pan American Games
| Silver medal – second place | 1995 Mar del Plata | Coxless pairs |
| Bronze medal – third place | 1987 Indianapolis | Coxless pairs |
| Bronze medal – third place | 1987 Indianapolis | Coxed pairs |

Daniel Pablo Scuri (born 28 August 1962) is an Argentine rower. He competed at the 1988 Summer Olympics and the 1996 Summer Olympics.
