= Querín =

Querín is a surname. Notable people with the surname include:

- Federico Querín (born 1966), Argentine rower
- Leonardo Facundo Querín (born 1982), Argentine handball player
