= Dave Fellows =

American engineer (born 1952)

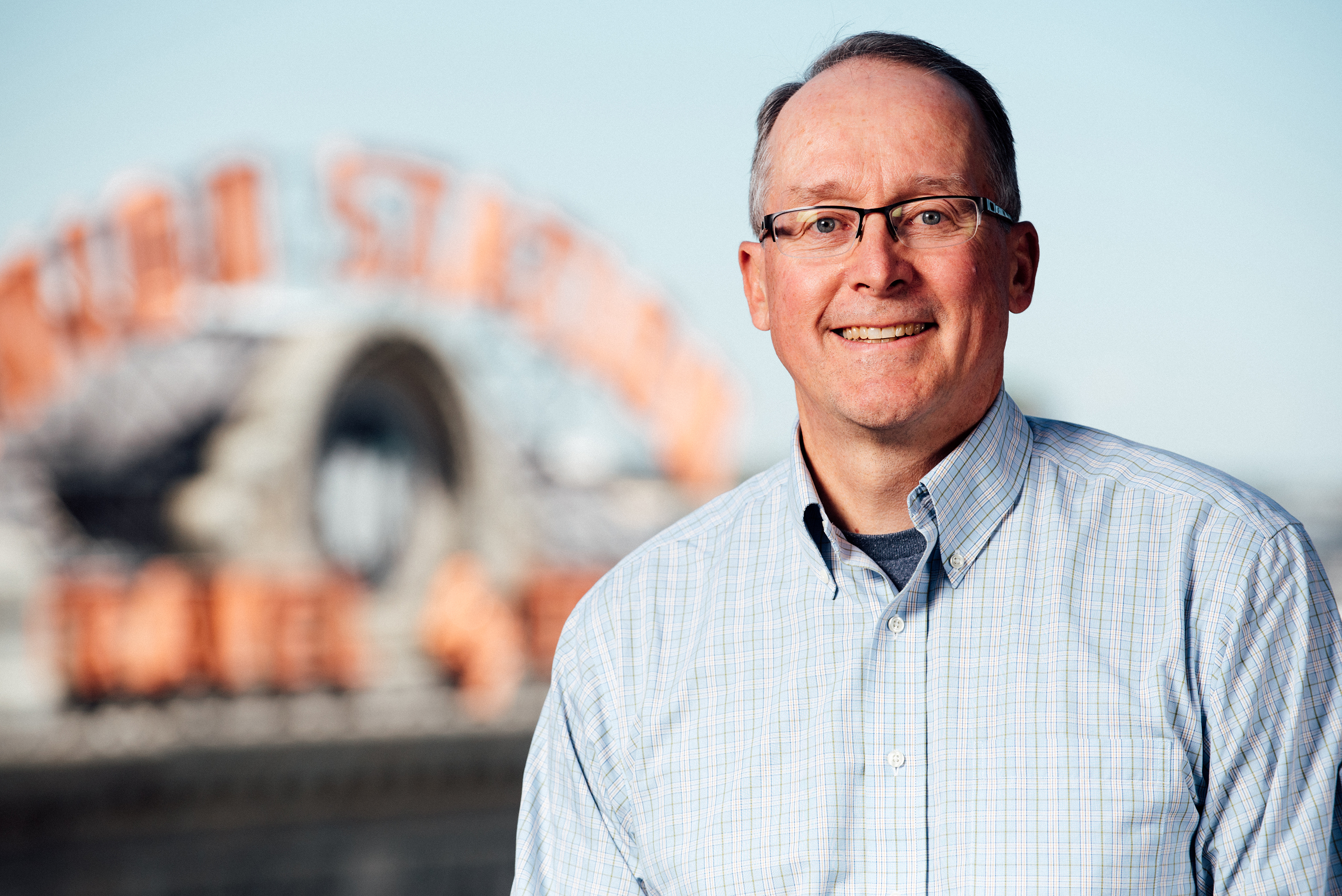
- Fellows in 2015
- Born: David Munro Fellows; September 19, 1952 (age 73); Waltham, MA
- Education: Harvard University; Northeastern University
- Occupations: Technologist, engineer, scientist
- Years active: 1978 – present
- Employer: Layer3 TV
- Organization(s): Chief scientist for Energy 2020; Data Standards Subcommittee Chair
- Board member of: Layer3 TV; Anadigics
- Awards: Vanguard Award for Science and Technology

David Fellows (born September 19, 1952) is an American engineer, entrepreneur, and scientist. He is the co-founder and chief technology officer of Layer3 TV, and served previously as the chief technology officer for Comcast and AT&T Broadband.

Fellows is also an athlete. He competed in the 1976 Olympic Games as a member of the US Rowing team.

== Early life and education ==
Fellows is the son of Gordon W. Fellows, a microbiologist from Wayland, Massachusetts. In high school, he ran track.

He received a bachelor's degree in engineering and applied physics at Harvard University and a master's degree in electrical engineering from Northeastern University. He also completed post-graduate studies at Harvard Business School.

== Career ==
=== GTE Laboratories, Siemens, Scientific Atlanta ===
In 1976, Fellows was hired as a research scientist at GTE Laboratories, where he worked on fiber optics, digital signal processing, satellite communications, and technology related to the development of ISDN. After consulting on an integrated circuit strategy, he was promoted to vice president at GTE's headquarters in Stamford, Connecticut. He later returned to GTE Laboratories as a liaison to the product division, and subsequently served as VP of R&D for transmission products, focusing on digital loop carrier and fiber technology. He continued to be associated with GTE and GTE Transmissions Systems (which was acquired by Siemens) until 1987, when he was named president of the transmissions systems business division of Scientific Atlanta. At Scientific Atlanta, he developed technology used to deliver video via satellite and cable.

In 1979, Fellows filed for his first patent. Awarded in 1982, it enabled devices to power down and use only the energy required to monitor for signals indicating a need to be recharged.

=== Continental Cablevision, Media One, Pilot House ===
In 1992, Fellows was hired as senior vice president of engineering and CTO at Continental Cablevision, where he worked with Amos Hostetter, Jr., the company's founder. Under his supervision, Continental launched a high-speed on-line data service, Highway 1, implementing and developing data-over-cable connections and hybrid fiber coaxial (HFC) architecture. Fellows became CTO of MediaOne Group when it acquired Continental in 1996, and additionally served as the interim CTO of Roadrunner, which was partially owned by MediaOne.

Fellows left MediaOne in 1998 to help with the care of his son Christopher after he was diagnosed with a brain stem tumor. During this time, Fellows founded Pilot House Ventures and served as a principal. Largely funded by Hostetter, Pilot House invested in early-stage technology companies, including enterprise software, network infrastructure, internet, and communications companies.

=== AT&T Broadband, Comcast ===
In 2001, Fellows was named CTO of AT&T Broadband; after its merger with Comcast, he became Comcast's executive vice president and CTO, overseeing the company's 15,000 engineers and technicians. He created the architecture for television, broadband, and voice delivery, and in 2005, Fellows replaced the core of the legacy cable infrastructure with a "mini internet," which resulted in Comcast's delivery of video programming based on internet protocols and equipment. He also developed Comcast's “Triple Play” strategy of bundling together cable, broadband and television subscriptions.

=== Genovation Capital, Layer3 TV ===
In 2010 Fellows partnered with Broadbus founder Jeff Binder and Broadbus CEO Vin Bisceglia to form Genovation Capital. It partnered with TPG Capital and the private equity firm Silver Lake to evaluate startups and companies to invest in or buy, focusing on communications, media and the internet sectors.

In 2013, Binder and Fellows co-founded Layer3 TV, a cable company which uses an IP-based video platform to deliver video in unicast streams. The company spent several years building out its technology and negotiating content deals before launching in the fall of 2016.

== Rowing career ==
As a student at Harvard, Fellows was recruited for the university's rowing team. He captained the Rude and Smooth boat, which went undefeated and won the unofficial national title in 1974. He rowed for seven United States national rowing teams between 1973 and 1979, including the teams of the 1975 and 1979 Pan American Games, where he won a bronze and a silver medal, respectively. He was the captain of the 1976 Olympic rowing team.

== Affiliations and recognition ==
Fellows serves as the chief scientist for the Society of Cable Telecommunications Engineers Energy 2020 Initiative and is the chair of the Data Standards Subcommittee. He was the chair of the DOCSIS Certification Board and was on the board of directors for Anadigics. He is a winner of the SCTE Vanguard Award for Science and Technology and a Cable Pioneers honoree.

== Personal life ==
Fellows and April Derderian, married in 1974, have three children. After Christopher Fellows' brain tumor was treated by pediatric neurosurgeons at Boston Children's Hospital using a borrowed Yttrium-Argon-Garnet (YAG) laser, Fellows and Derderian raised the funds to purchase a laser for the hospital. They later endowed the Christopher K. Fellows Family Chair in Pediatric Neurosurgery at Children's Hospital. They also established two additional funds to support the hospital's pediatric neurosurgery department.

Fellows, also a runner and cyclist, continued to row following his competitive career. He was named to the Harvard University Athletic Hall of Fame in 1998.
