= Osmani Martín =

Cuban rower

Personal information
- Full name: Osmani Martín Hernández
- Nationality: Cuban
- Born: 9 January 1979 (age 47)
- Height: 180 cm (5 ft 11 in)
- Weight: 70 kg (154 lb)
Medal record
Men's rowing
Representing Cuba
Pan American Games
Gold medal – first place	1991 Havana	Lwt quadruple sculls
Gold medal – first place	1995 Mar del Plata	Lwt single sculls
Gold medal – first place	1995 Mar del Plata	Lwt quadruple sculls
Silver medal – second place	1987 Indianapolis	Lwt single sculls
Silver medal – second place	1991 Havana	Lwt single sculls
Silver medal – second place	1999 Winnipeg	Lwt single sculls
Silver medal – second place	1999 Winnipeg	Lwt quadruple sculls

Osmani Martín Hernández (Note: In this Spanish name, the first or paternal surname is Martín and the second or maternal family name is Hernández.) (born 9 January 1969) is a Cuban former rower. He competed in the men's lightweight double sculls event at the 2000 Summer Olympics.
