= Miguel Cerda =

Chilean rower (born 1969)

Personal information
- Full name: Miguel Angel Cerda Silva
- Born: 27 December 1969 (age 56) Valdivia, Chile
Medal record
Men's rowing
Representing Chile
World Championships
| Gold medal – first place | 2002 Seville | LM2- |
| Silver medal – second place | 1999 St. Catharines | LM2- |
| Silver medal – second place | 2005 Gifu | LM2- |
| Bronze medal – third place | 1998 Cologne | LM2- |
Pan American Games
| Bronze medal – third place | 1999 Winnipeg | Lwt coxless four |

Miguel Angel Cerda Silva (Note: In this Spanish name, the first or paternal surname is Cerda and the second or maternal family name is Silva.) (born 27 December 1969) is a Chilean rower.
