= Damian Ordás =

Argentine rower

Personal information
- Born: 1 August 1977 (age 48) Buenos Aires, Argentina

Sport
- Sport: Rowing
Medal record
Men's rowing
Representing Argentina
Pan American Games
Gold medal – first place	1999 Winnipeg	Coxless pair
Gold medal – first place	1999 Winnipeg	Double sculls
Gold medal – first place	1999 Winnipeg	Coxless four
Silver medal – second place	1999 Winnipeg	Eight
Bronze medal – third place	2007 Rio de Janeiro	Eight

Damian Ordás (born 1 August 1977) is an Argentine rower. He competed in the men's coxless pair event at the 2000 Summer Olympics.
