= Ulf Lienhard =

Argentine rower (born 1975)

Personal information
- Born: 3 May 1975 (age 51) Buenos Aires, Argentina

Sport
- Sport: Rowing
Medal record
Men's rowing
Representing Argentina
Pan American Games
| Gold medal – first place | 1999 Winnipeg | Lwt double sculls |
| Gold medal – first place | 1999 Winnipeg | Lwt quadruple sculls |

Ulf Lienhard (born 3 May 1975) is an Argentine rower. He competed in the men's lightweight double sculls event at the 2000 Summer Olympics.
