= Edward Murphy (rower) =

American rower (born 1971)

Ted Murphy
Personal information
- Full name: Edward B. Murphy
- Born: October 30, 1971 (age 54) West Newton, Massachusetts, U.S.
- Height: 6 ft 6 in (1.98 m)
- Weight: 218 lb (99 kg)
Medal record
Men's rowing
Representing the United States
Olympic Games
Silver medal – second place	2000 Sydney	Coxless pairs
World Championships
Silver medal – second place	1994 Indianapolis	M4+
Bronze medal – third place	1997 Aiguebelette	M2-
Pan American Games
Gold medal – first place	1999 Winnipeg	Eight

Edward B. Murphy (born October 30, 1971, in West Newton, Massachusetts) is an American rower. He is a 1994 graduate of Dartmouth and a member of the Dartmouth Crew and National Rowing Foundation Hall of Fame.
