= Greg Stevenson =

Canadian rower

Personal information
- Born: 27 February 1969 (age 57) Sherbrooke, Quebec, Canada

Sport
- Sport: Rowing
Medal record
Representing Canada
Pan American Games
Silver medal – second place	1995 Mar del Plata	Coxless fours
Silver medal – second place	1995 Mar del Plata	Eights
Bronze medal – third place	1991 Havana	Coxless fours

Gregory Todd "Greg" Stevenson (born 27 February 1969) is a Canadian rower. He competed at the 1992 Summer Olympics and the 1996 Summer Olympics.
