= Marisa Peguri =

Argentine rower

Personal information
- Full name: Marisa Alejandra Peguri
- Born: 24 March 1976 (age 50) San Fernando, Argentina

Sport
- Sport: Rowing
Medal record
Women's rowing
Representing Argentina
Pan American Games
Gold medal – first place	1999 Winnipeg	Lwt quadruple sculls

Marisa Alejandra Peguri (born 24 March 1976) is an Argentine former rower. She competed in the women's lightweight double sculls event at the 2000 Summer Olympics.
