= Alexis Arias (rower) =

Cuban rower (born 1969)

Personal information
- Born: 19 October 1969 (age 56) Villa Clara, Cuba

Sport
- Sport: Rowing
Medal record
Representing Cuba
Pan American Games
Gold medal – first place	1991 Havana	Lwt double sculls
Gold medal – first place	1991 Havana	Lwt quadruple sculls
Gold medal – first place	1995 Mar del Plata	Lwt quadruple sculls
Silver medal – second place	1995 Mar del Plata	Lwt double sculls
Bronze medal – third place	1995 Mar del Plata	Lwt eights

Alexis Arias Mestre (born 19 October 1969) is a Cuban former rower. He competed in the men's lightweight double sculls event at the 1996 Summer Olympics.
