= Paul Daniels (rower) =

American rower

Personal information
- Born: June 4, 1981 (age 45) Burlington, Wisconsin, United States

Sport
- Sport: Rowing
Medal record
Men's rowing
Representing United States
World Rowing Championships
Gold medal – first place	2005 Gifu	M8+
Bronze medal – third place	2004 Banyoles	M4+
Bronze medal – third place	2006 Eton	M8+
Pan American Games
Gold medal – first place	2003 Santo Domingo	M8+
Silver medal – second place	2003 Santo Domingo	M4+

Paul N. Daniels (born June 4, 1981) is an American rower. He studied at the University of Wisconsin and then in 2005 come to the UK to study an MSc Nature, Society & Env. Policy at St Anne's College in the University of Oxford. He is a former member of Oxford University Boat Club (rowing in the 2005 boat race) and St Anne's Boat Club.

Daniels is an actuary working for Blenheim Capital Management. He has worked at Blenheim for some time and was previously an analyst at Blenheim.
