= David Simon (rower) =

American former rower (born 1979)

Personal information
- Born: December 2, 1979 (age 46) West Bloomfield Township, Michigan, United States

Sport
- Sport: Rowing
Medal record
Men's rowing
Representing the United States
Pan American Games
Gold medal – first place	1999 Winnipeg	Eight

David Simon (born December 2, 1979) is an American former rower. He competed in the men's eight event at the 2000 Summer Olympics.
