= Nicholas Anderson (rower) =

American rower (born 1975)

Personal information
- Nationality: American
- Born: February 3, 1975 (age 51) Spokane, Washington, U.S.
Medal record
Men's rowing
Representing the United States
World Championships
Gold medal – first place	1997 Aiguebelette	M2+
Gold medal – first place	1999 St. Catharines	M2+
Gold medal – first place	2000 Zagreb	M2+
Bronze medal – third place	1998 Cologne	M2+
Pan American Games
Gold medal – first place	1999 Winnipeg	Eight

Nicholas Anderson (born February 3, 1975) is an American rower.
