= Fredric Honebein =

American rower (born 1968)

Fred Honebein
Personal information
- Full name: Fredric H. Honebein
- Born: April 1, 1968 (age 58) Tiburon, California, U.S.
- Height: 6 ft 5 in (195 cm)
- Weight: 201 lb (91 kg)
Medal record
Men's rowing
Representing United States
World Championships
Gold medal – first place	1994 Indianapolis	Eight
Bronze medal – third place	1993 Račice	Eight
Bronze medal – third place	1995 Tampere	Eight
Pan American Games
Gold medal – first place	1995 Mar del Plata	Coxless pair

Fredric H. "Fred" Honebein (born April 1, 1968, in Tiburon, California) is an American rower. He finished 5th in the men's eight at the 1996 Summer Olympics.
