= Don Smith (rower) =

American rower

Personal information
- Full name: Donald W. Smith
- Born: April 7, 1968 (age 58) North Tonawanda, New York, U.S.
- Height: 6 ft 6 in (198 cm)
- Weight: 207 lb (94 kg)
Medal record
Men's rowing
Representing United States
World Championships
Gold medal – first place	1994 Indianapolis	Eight
Bronze medal – third place	1993 Račice	Eight
Bronze medal – third place	1995 Tampere	Eight
Pan American Games
Gold medal – first place	1995 Mar del Plata	Coxless pair

Donald W. "Don" Smith (born April 7, 1968 in North Tonawanda, New York) is an American rower. He finished 5th in the men's eight at the 1996 Summer Olympics.
