= Juan Huber =

Argentine rower

Personal information
- Born: 19 September 1937; Rosario, Argentina
- Died: 24 June 2010 (aged 72)

Sport
- Sport: Rowing

Juan Huber (19 September 1937 – 24 June 2010) is an Argentine rower. He competed in the men's coxless four event at the 1960 Summer Olympics. He won a silver medal in the coxless four and a bronze medal in the eight at the 1959 Pan American Games.
