= Jonathan Moss (rower) =

American rower and assist referee

Personal information
- Born: 1969 (age 56–57) Springfield, Massachusetts, United States

Sport
- Sport: Rowing
- Club: Pioneer Valley Riverfront Club
Medal record
Men's rowing
Representing United States
World Championships
Gold medal – first place	1993 Račice	Lwt men's four
Pan American Games
Gold medal – first place	1995 Mar del Plata	Lwt men's four

Jonathan Moss (born c. 1969) is an American lightweight rower. He won a gold medal at the 1993 World Rowing Championships in Račice with the lightweight men's four.
