= Guillermo Pfaab =

Argentine rower

Personal information
- Full name: Guillermo Francisco Pfaab Romano
- Born: 11 October 1968 (age 57) San Carlos de Bariloche, Argentina

Sport
- Sport: Rowing
Medal record
Men's rowing
Representing Argentina
Pan American Games
Gold medal – first place	1995 Mar del Plata	Double sculls
Gold medal – first place	1995 Mar del Plata	Quadrupple sculls
Gold medal – first place	1999 Winnipeg	Coxless four

Guillermo Francisco Pfaab Romano (Note: In this Spanish name, the first or paternal surname is Pfaab and the second or maternal family name is Romano.) (born 11 October 1968) is an Argentine former rower. He competed at the 1992 Summer Olympics and the 1996 Summer Olympics.

It was announced in November 2020 that he had been appointed technical director of the El Salvador Olympic Committee.
