= Tom Auth =

American rower (born 1968)

Personal information
- Full name: Thomas Auth
- Nationality: American
- Born: September 9, 1968 (age 57) Orange, New Jersey, U.S.

Sport
- Sport: Rowing
Medal record
Men's rowing
Representing the United States
Pan American Games
Gold medal – first place	1999 Winnipeg	Lwt coxless four

Thomas Auth (born September 9, 1968) is an American former rower. He competed at the 1996 Summer Olympics and the 2000 Summer Olympics. He won a gold medal at the 1999 Pan American Games.

A 1986 graduate of Columbia High School in Maplewood, New Jersey, he graduated from Columbia College of Columbia University in 1990 and Harvard Law School in 1994.
