= Todd Hallett =

Canadian rower

Personal information
- Born: 12 May 1970 (age 56) Shelburne, Nova Scotia, Canada

Sport
- Sport: Rowing
- Club: Mic Mac Amateur Athletic Club
Medal record
Representing Canada
Pan American Games
Silver medal – second place	1995 Mar del Plata	Eights
Bronze medal – third place	1991 Havana	Single sculls
Bronze medal – third place	1995 Mar del Plata	Double sculls

Denton Todd Hallett (born 12 May 1970) is a Canadian rower. He competed at the 1992 Summer Olympics, 1996 Summer Olympics and the 2000 Summer Olympics.
