= Diego Aguirregomezcorta =

Argentine rower

Personal information
- Born: 9 December 1974 (age 51) Buenos Aires, Argentina

Sport
- Sport: Rowing
Medal record
Men's rowing
Representing Argentina
Pan American Games
Silver medal – second place	1999 Winnipeg	Eight

Diego Aguirregomezcorta (born 9 December 1974) is an Argentine former rower. He competed in the men's coxless pair event at the 2000 Summer Olympics.
