= Horacio Sicilia =

Argentine rower

Personal information
- Full name: Horacio Eduardo Sicilia
- Nationality: Argentine
- Born: 22 March 1974 (age 52)

Sport
- Sport: Rowing
Medal record
Men's rowing
Representing Argentina
Pan American Games
Gold medal – first place	1999 Winnipeg	Coxless four
Gold medal – first place	2007 Rio de Janeiro	Coxless four
Silver medal – second place	1999 Winnipeg	Eight
Bronze medal – third place	2007 Rio de Janeiro	Eight

Horacio Eduardo Sicilia (born 22 March 1974) is an Argentine rower. He competed in the men's coxless four event at the 1996 Summer Olympics.
