= Guillermo Segurado =

Argentine rower (1946–2024)

Personal information
- Born: 2 October 1946 Rosario, Santa Fe Province, Argentina
- Died: 10 June 2024 (aged 77)

Sport
- Sport: Rowing
Medal record
Men's rowing
Representing Argentina
Pan American Games
Gold medal – first place	1971 Cali	Eight

Guillermo Segurado (2 October 1946 – 10 June 2024) was an Argentine rower. He competed at the 1968 Summer Olympics and the 1972 Summer Olympics. Segurado died on 10 June 2024, at the age of 77.
