= Walter Balunek =

Argentine rower (born 1972)

Personal information
- Full name: Walter Daniel Balunek
- Born: 2 July 1972 (age 53) Buenos Aires, Argentina

Sport
- Sport: Rowing
Medal record
Men's rowing
Representing Argentina
Pan American Games
Gold medal – first place	1999 Winnipeg	Coxless pair
Gold medal – first place	1999 Winnipeg	Double sculls
Gold medal – first place	1999 Winnipeg	Coxless four
Silver medal – second place	1999 Winnipeg	Eight

Walter Daniel Balunek (born 2 July 1972) is an Argentine former rower. He competed in the men's coxless pair event at the 1996 Summer Olympics.
