= Paul Teti =

American rower

Personal information
- Born: February 5, 1977 (age 49) Upper Darby Township, Pennsylvania, U.S.

Sport
- Country: United States
- Sport: Rowing
Medal record
Men's rowing
Representing the United States
Pan American Games
Gold medal – first place	1999 Winnipeg	Lwt coxless four

Paul Teti (born February 5, 1977) is an American rower. He competed at the 2004 Summer Olympics in Athens, where he placed 9th in the men's lightweight coxless four with the American team. Teti was born in Upper Darby Township, Pennsylvania.
