= Christián Yantani =

Chilean rower (born 1975)

Personal information
- Full name: Christián Yantani Garcés
- Born: 8 August 1975 (age 51) Valdivia, Chile
Medal record
Men's rowing
Representing Chile
World Championships
Gold medal – first place	2002 Seville	LM2-
Silver medal – second place	1999 St. Catharines	LM2-
Bronze medal – third place	1998 Cologne	LM2-
Pan American Games
Bronze medal – third place	1999 Winnipeg	Lwt coxless four

Christián Yantani Garcés (Note: In this Spanish name, the first or paternal surname is Yantani and the second or maternal family name is Garcés.) (born 8 August 1975 in Valdivia) is a Chilean rower.
