= William Carlucci =

American rower (born 1967)

Bill Carlucci
Personal information
- Full name: William H. Carlucci
- Born: June 3, 1967 (age 59) Rye Brook, New York, U.S.
Medal record
Men's rowing
Representing the United States
Olympic Games
Bronze medal – third place	1996 Atlanta	Lwt coxless four
World Championships
Silver medal – second place	1998 Cologne	Lwt eight
Pan American Games
Gold medal – first place	1999 Winnipeg	Lwt coxless four
Silver medal – second place	1995 Mar del Plata	Lwt quadruple sculls

William H. "Bill" Carlucci (born June 3, 1967) is an American rower.

Carlucci rowed at Johns Hopkins University. He did not know how to swim.
