= Michelle Knox-Zaloom =

American rower (born 1964)

Personal information
- Nationality: American
- Born: November 17, 1964 (age 61) Portland, Oregon, United States

Sport
- Sport: Rowing
Medal record
Representing United States
World Rowing Championships
Bronze medal – third place	1993 Racice	Quadruple sculls
Pan American Games
Gold medal – first place	1991 Havana	Quadruple sculls
Silver medal – second place	1995 Mar del Plata	Double sculls

Michelle Knox-Zaloom (born November 17, 1964) is an American former rower. She competed in a quad and came in first at the 1991 Pan American Games. She competed in a quad at the 1992 Summer Olympics and a double in the 1996 Summer Olympics.
