= Aquil Abdullah =

American rower (born 1973)

Aquil Abdullah OLY
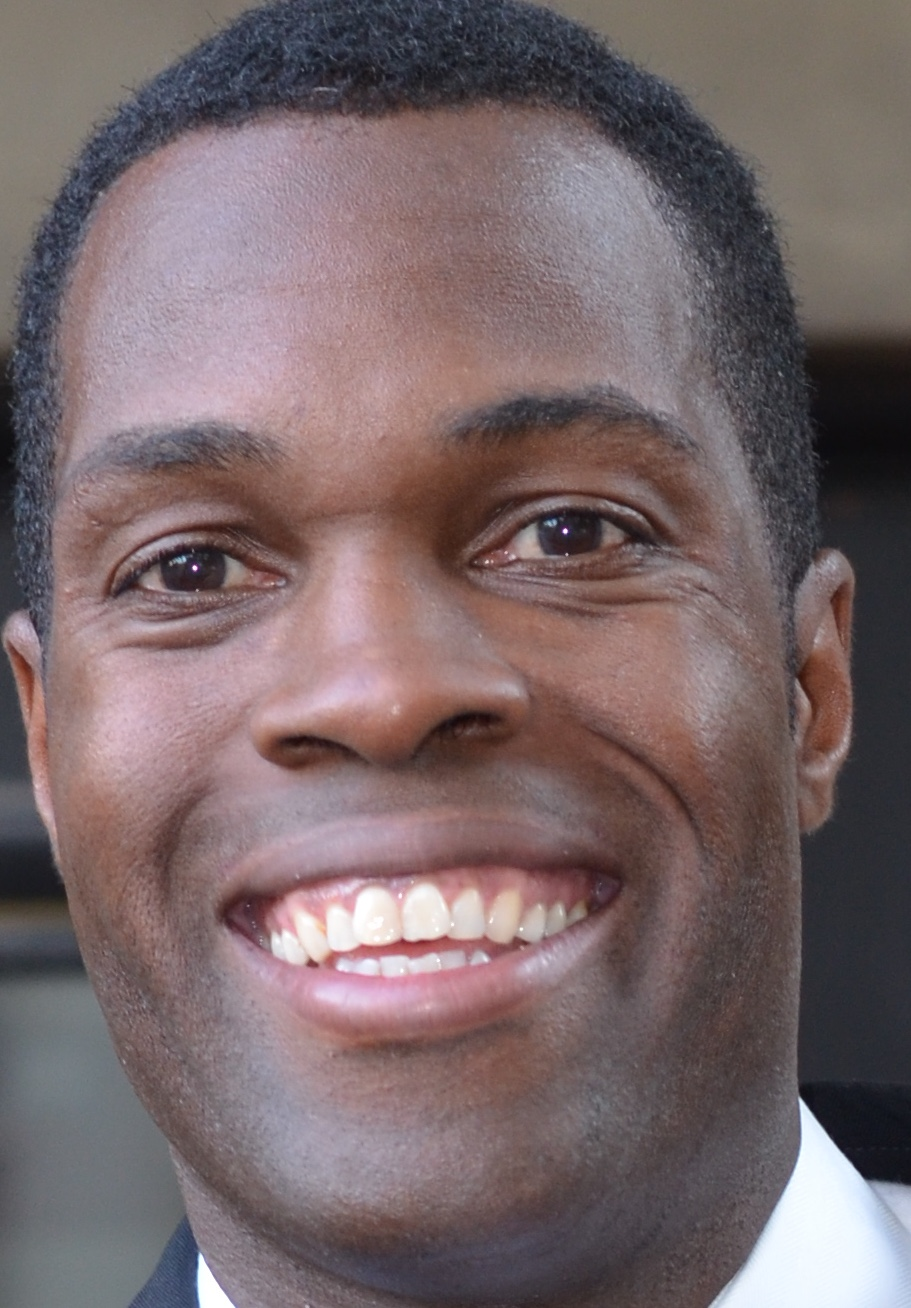

Personal information
- Full name: Aquil Hashim Abdullah
- Born: Aquil ibn Michael X. Shumate; June 20, 1973 (age 53) Washington, D.C., U.S.
Medal record
Men's rowing
Representing the United States
Pan American Games
Silver medal – second place	1999 Winnipeg	Single sculls

Aquil Hashim Abdullah (born Aquil ibn Michael X. Shumate; June 20, 1973) is an American rower who was the first African-American male to qualify for the Summer Olympics in the sport of rowing.

== Early life and education ==
Abdullah was born in Washington, D.C., on June 20, 1973. He was born with the name Aquil ibn Michael X. Shumate. When his father, Michael Shumate, converted to Islam when Aquil was 6, he changed his last name to Abdullah.

He attended Woodrow Wilson High School in Northwest Washington, D.C. It is the only public school in DC with a rowing program. He played on the football team, but began rowing in his senior year.

Abdullah took a rowing scholarship to George Washington University and attended from 1992 to 1996, majoring in physics. He was the first African-American male to win a rowing national championship in 1996, when he won the single sculls competition.

== Rowing career ==
Abdullah won the silver medal in the single sculls at the 1999 Pan-American Games.

In 2000, he won the Diamond Challenge Sculls (the premier event for single sculls) at the Henley Royal Regatta, defeating Simon Goodbrand by two-thirds of a boat length. He was the first African-American rower to win the Diamond Sculls race .

Abdullah was a member of the U.S. 2001 World Championship Rowing Team. but missed qualifying for the Summer Olympic Games in Sydney, Australia by 0.33 of a second. He co-authored a book with Chris Ingraham titled Perfect Balance in 2001, after his failure to qualify for the 2000 Summer Olympics.

In 2002, he was the single sculls winner in the 2002 United States national rowing championship.

=== 2004 Summer Olympics ===
Abdullah paired with US Navy Officer Henry Nuzum for the 2004 Qualified Olympic Small Boat Trials in Windsor, NJ. Their qualifying time was 6:23.59. Abdullah and Nuzum were also the first American men to qualify for the Olympic final in double sculls for twenty years.

At the 2004 Summer Olympics, Abdullah and Nuzum finished sixth in their race, 3.93 seconds slower that the bronze medal pace.

== Personal life ==
Abdullah resided in Boston, Massachusetts, where he works as a software engineer. He also plays the saxophone and is a Catholic convert.

Abdullah worked with a program in Boston named Mandela Crew. Mandela Crew is a program aimed at exposing minority youths from Roxbury to the sport of rowing.
