= Raúl Domínguez (cyclist) =

Cuban cyclist (born 1972)

Personal information
- Born: 15 August 1972 (age 53)
Medal record
Men's track cycling
Representing Cuba
Pan American Games
Gold medal – first place	1991 Havana	Individual Pursuit
Gold medal – first place	1991 Havana	Team Pursuit

Raúl Domínguez Romero (born 15 August 1972) is a retired male track cyclist from Cuba. He competed for his native country at the 1992 Summer Olympics in Barcelona, Spain, after having won two gold medals in the previous year at the 1991 Pan American Games in Havana, Cuba.
