= Kurt Borcherding =

American rower

Personal information
- Nationality: American
- Born: February 25, 1967 (age 59)
Medal record
Men's rowing
Representing the United States
World Championships
Gold medal – first place	2000 Zagreb	M2+
Bronze medal – third place	1998 Cologne	M2+
Pan American Games
Gold medal – first place	1999 Winnipeg	Eight

Kurt Borcherding (born February 25, 1967) is a retired American rower. He is one of University of Wisconsin former rowers who are smokejumpers. He is an Alaska Smokejumper.
