= Félipe Leal =

Chilean rower (born 1982)

Personal information
- Born: 8 March 1982 (age 44) Santiago, Chile

Sport
- Sport: Rowing
Medal record
Representing Chile
Pan American Games
Gold medal – first place	2003 Santo Domingo	Lightweight coxless fours
Gold medal – first place	2015 Toronto	Coxless pairs
Bronze medal – third place	2007 Rio de Janeiro	Lightweight double sculls
Bronze medal – third place	2011 Guadalajara	Lightweight coxless fours

Félipe Augusto Leal Atero (born 8 March 1982) is a Chilean rower. He competed in the men's single sculls event at the 2000 Summer Olympics.
