= Héctor Moni =

Argentine rower (1936–2022)

Personal information
- Born: 7 February 1936; Rosario, Argentina
- Died: 22 August 2022 (aged 86)

Sport
- Sport: Rowing

Héctor Lelio Moni (7 February 1936 – 22 August 2022) was an Argentine rower. He competed in the men's coxless four event at the 1960 Summer Olympics.

He won a silver medal in the coxless four and a bronze medal in the eight at the 1959 Pan American Games.

Moni died on 22 August 2022.
