= Sebastián Massa =

Argentine rower

Personal information
- Full name: Sebastián Rodrigo Massa
- Born: 4 February 1975 (age 51) Buenos Aires, Argentina

Sport
- Sport: Rowing
Medal record
Men's rowing
Representing Argentina
Pan American Games
Gold medal – first place	1999 Winnipeg	Lwt quadruple sculls

Sebastián Rodrigo Massa (born 4 February 1975) is an Argentine former rower. He competed in the men's lightweight double sculls event at the 2000 Summer Olympics.
