= Carlos de Almeida =

Brazilian rower (born 1969)

Personal information
- Full name: Carlos Alexandre Buckton de Almeida
- Born: 11 December 1969 (age 56) Rio de Janeiro, Brazil

Sport
- Sport: Rowing
Medal record
Representing Brazil
Pan American Games
Bronze medal – third place	1991 Havana	Coxless pairs
Bronze medal – third place	1995 Mar del Plata	Coxless pairs

Carlos de Almeida (born 11 December 1969) is a Brazilian rower. He competed in the men's coxed pair event at the 1992 Summer Olympics.
