= María Garisoain =

Argentine rower

Personal information
- Full name: María Julia Garisoain
- Born: 22 July 1971 (age 54) Buenos Aires, Argentina

Sport
- Sport: Rowing
Medal record
Women's rowing
Representing Argentina
Pan American Games
Gold medal – first place	1995 Mar del Plata	Lwt single sculls
Gold medal – first place	1999 Winnipeg	Lwt single sculls
Gold medal – first place	1999 Winnipeg	Lwt quadruple sculls
Bronze medal – third place	1991 Havana	Lwt single sculls
Bronze medal – third place	1995 Mar del Plata	Single sculls

María Garisoain (born 22 July 1971) is an Argentine rower. She competed at the 1996 Summer Olympics and the 2000 Summer Olympics.

== Honours ==
Winner of the Konex Award 2000 She won three gold medals at the Pan American Championships (1995-1999), two bronze medals at the World Championships (1998-1999) and two Pan American medals (1991-1995). She won the Silver Olympia Award in 1997, and the Golden Button of the Argentine Rowing Federation.

== Career ==
She was the first Latin American woman to reach the World Championship finals and win a medal. She won over 120 races (1997–1998), both nationally and internationally. She is a member of the Executive Board of the Argentine Olympic Committee, the Association of World Olympic Athletes, and the Argentine Rowing Association Lightweight single scull. Continuous Argentine rowing champion from 1991 to 1999. South American champion in 1991, 1993, 1995, 1997, and 1999. She was the first Argentine international rower (1991), and on two occasions.
