= Eusebio Acea =

Cuban rower (born 1969)

Personal information
- Full name: Eusebio Acea Colarte
- Nationality: Cuban
- Born: 28 February 1969 (age 57)
- Height: 1.90 m (6 ft 3 in)
- Weight: 95 kg (209 lb)

Sport
- Sport: Rowing
Medal record
Men's rowing
Representing Cuba
Pan American Games
Bronze medal – third place	1999 Winnipeg	Eight

Eusebio Acea Colarte (born 28 February 1969) is a Cuban rower. He competed in the 2000 Summer Olympics.
