= Luis Miguel García =

Mexican rower (born 1967)

Personal information
- Nationality: Mexican
- Born: 16 October 1967 (age 58)

Sport
- Sport: Rowing
Medal record
Representing Mexico
Pan American Games
Gold medal – first place	1991 Havana	Lwt single sculls
Bronze medal – third place	1991 Havana	Quadruple sculls
Central American and Caribbean Games
Gold medal – first place	1986 Santiago	Lwt double sculls
Gold medal – first place	1990 Mexico City	Lwt single sculls
Gold medal – first place	1990 Mexico City	Eights
Silver medal – second place	1986 Santiago	Coxless fours
Silver medal – second place	1990 Mexico City	Coxless fours
Silver medal – second place	1993 Ponce	Single sculls
Silver medal – second place	1993 Ponce	Double sculls
Silver medal – second place	1993 Ponce	Coxless fours
Silver medal – second place	1993 Ponce	Eights

Luis Miguel García Delgado (born 16 October 1967) is a Mexican rower. He competed at the 1988 Summer Olympics and the 1992 Summer Olympics.
