= Linda Muri =

American rower

Personal information
- Born: January 4, 1963 (age 63) Woburn, Massachusetts, United States

Sport
- Sport: Rowing
Medal record
Representing the United States
World Championships
Gold medal – first place	1994 Indianapolis	LW4-
Gold medal – first place	1995 Tampere	LW4-
Silver medal – second place	1997 Aiguebelette	LW2-
Bronze medal – third place	1998 Cologne	LW2-
Gold medal – first place	1999 St. Catherines	LW2-
Pan American Games
Silver medal – second place	1991 Havana	LW2-

Linda Muri (born January 4, 1963) is an American rower. In the 1994 and 1995 World Rowing Championships, she won gold medals in the women's lightweight coxless four event. She graduated from the Massachusetts Institute of Technology and the Harvard Graduate School of Education.
