= Francisco Mora (rower) =

Cuban rower (1952–2026)

Personal information
- Full name: Francisco Mora Molina
- Nationality: Cuban
- Born: 30 July 1952
- Died: 1 August 2026 (aged 74) Havana, Cuba

Sport
- Sport: Rowing
Medal record
Men's rowing
Representing Cuba
Pan American Games
| Silver medal – second place | 1975 Mexico City | Coxed four |
| Silver medal – second place | 1975 Mexico City | Eight |
| Gold medal – first place | 1979 San Juan | Coxed four |
| Bronze medal – third place | 1979 San Juan | Eight |

Francisco Mora Molina (30 July 1952 – 1 August 2026) was a Cuban rower. He competed at the 1976 Summer Olympics and the 1980 Summer Olympics. Mora died in Havana on 1 August 2026, at the age of 74.
