= Brain stem tumor =

A brain stem tumor is a tumor in the part of the brain that connects to the spinal cord (the brain stem).

== Symptoms and signs ==
The symptoms of brain stem tumors vary greatly and can include ataxia, cranial nerve palsy, headaches, problems with speech and swallowing, hearing loss, weakness, hemiparesis, vision abnormalities, ptosis, and behavioral changes. Another possible symptom is vomiting. Headaches related to brainstem tumors may be worse shortly after waking up in the morning.

== Diagnosis ==
An MRI is better than a CT scan when a brainstem tumor is in the differential diagnosis.

=== Types of brain stem tumors ===
The most common form of brainstem tumor is the brainstem glioma.

== Treatment ==
Treatment typically consists of radiotherapy and steroids for palliation of symptoms. Radiotherapy may result in minimally extended survival time.

== Prognosis ==
Prognosis is very poor, with only 37% of treated patients surviving one year or more. Topotecan has been studied in the treatment of brainstem glioma, otherwise, chemotherapy is probably ineffective, though further study is needed.
