= Enrique Carrillo =

Cuban coxswain

Personal information
- Full name: Enrique Carrillo Bernal
- Nationality: Cuban
- Born: 15 July 1953 (age 72)
- Height: 152 cm (5 ft 0 in)
- Weight: 50 kg (110 lb)

Sport
- Sport: Rowing
Medal record
Men's rowing
Representing Cuba
Pan American Games
Gold medal – first place	1979 San Juan	Coxed four
Bronze medal – third place	1979 San Juan	Eight
Gold medal – first place	1983 Caracas	Coxed pair

Enrique Carrillo Bernal (born 15 July 1953) is a Cuban rowing coxswain. He competed in two events at the 1980 Summer Olympics.
