= Phil Graham (rower) =

Canadian rower

Personal information
- Full name: Philip Graham
- Born: 16 July 1970 (age 56) Halifax, Nova Scotia, Canada

Sport
- Sport: Rowing
Medal record
Men's rowing
Representing Canada
Pan American Games
Silver medal – second place	1995 Mar del Plata	Coxless four
Silver medal – second place	1995 Mar del Plata	Eight
Bronze medal – third place	1999 Winnipeg	Coxless pair
Bronze medal – third place	1999 Winnipeg	Coxless four
Summer Universiade
Gold medal – first place	1993 Buffalo	Coxless pair
Silver medal – second place	1993 Buffalo	Quadruple sculls

Phil Graham (born 16 July 1970) is a Canadian rower. He competed at the 1996 Summer Olympics and the 2000 Summer Olympics.
