= Jon Brown (rower) =

American rower (born 1968)

Personal information
- Full name: Jonathan W. Brown
- Born: November 28, 1968 (age 57) New York City, New York, U.S.
Medal record
Men's rowing
Representing the United States
World Championships
| Gold medal – first place | 1994 Indianapolis | M8+ |
| Bronze medal – third place | 1993 Račice | M8+ |
| Bronze medal – third place | 1995 Tampere | M8+ |
Henley Royal Regatta
| Gold medal – first place | 1994 Grand Challenge Cup | M8+ |
| Gold medal – first place | 1995 Grand Challenge Cup | M8+ |
| Gold medal – first place | 1998 Queen Mother Cup | M4x |
Pan American Games
| Gold medal – first place | 1995 Mar del Plata | Coxless four |
| Gold medal – first place | 1995 Mar del Plata | Eight |
| Silver medal – second place | 1999 Winnipeg | Coxless four |

Jonathan W. Brown (born November 28, 1968) is an American rower. He finished 5th in the men's eight at the 1996 Summer Olympics. Jon Brown rowed at Boston University. He also won two bronze medals (1993, 1995) and one Gold (1994) in the HW8 at Worlds. Vanity Fair Cover 1996 Olympics photo shoot by Annie Leibowitz with other Olympic athletes.

Education: Boston University, Bachelor of Arts (BA), John Jay College (CUNY), Master's degree
