= Ismael Carbonell =

Cuban rower (born 1959)

Personal information
- Full name: Ismael Carbonell Samé
- Born: 5 February 1959 (age 67) Songo – La Maya, Cuba

Sport
- Sport: Rowing
Medal record
Men's rowing
Representing Cuba
Pan American Games
Gold medal – first place	1979 San Juan	Coxless four
Bronze medal – third place	1999 Winnipeg	Eight

Ismael Carbonell Samé (Note: In this Spanish name, the first or paternal surname is Carbonell and the second or maternal family name is Samé.) (born 5 February 1959) is a Cuban rower. He competed at the 1980 Summer Olympics and the 1992 Summer Olympics.
