= Don Dickison =

Canadian rower (born 1966)

Personal information
- Full name: Donald Charles Dickison
- Nationality: Canadian
- Born: 6 July 1966 (age 60) Jacksonville, Florida, United States

Sport
- Sport: Rowing
Medal record
Representing Canada
Pan American Games
Silver medal – second place	1991 Havana	Double sculls

Donald Charles "Don" Dickison (born 6 July 1966) is a Canadian rower. He competed at the 1988 Summer Olympics and the 1992 Summer Olympics.
