= Tom Murray (American rower) =

American rower (born 1969)

Personal information
- Full name: Thomas P. Murray
- Born: January 20, 1969 (age 57) Buffalo, New York, United States

Sport
- Sport: Rowing
Medal record
Men's rowing
Representing the United States
World Championships
Bronze medal – third place	1993 Račice	Eight
Gold medal – first place	1999 St. Catharines	Coxed four
Pan American Games
Gold medal – first place	1999 Winnipeg	Eight

Thomas P. Murray (born January 20, 1969) is an American rower. He competed in the men's coxless four event at the 1996 Summer Olympics.
