= Leonides Samé =

Cuban rower

Personal information
- Full name: Leonides Samé Sánchez
- Born: 9 July 1969 (age 56) Holguín, Cuba
- Height: 188 cm (6 ft 2 in)
- Weight: 90 kg (198 lb)
Medal record
Men's rowing
Representing Cuba
Pan American Games
Gold medal – first place	1991 Havana	Double sculls
Gold medal – first place	1991 Havana	Quadruple sculls
Bronze medal – third place	1995 Mar del Plata	Single sculls
Bronze medal – third place	1995 Mar del Plata	Quadruple sculls

Leonides Samé Sánchez (Note: In this Spanish name, the first or paternal surname is Samé and the second or maternal family name is Sánchez.) (born 9 July 1969) is a Cuban rower. He competed in the men's quadruple sculls event at the 2000 Summer Olympics.
