= Silken Laumann =

Canadian rower (born 1964)

Personal information
- Born: November 14, 1964 (age 61) Toronto Township, Ontario, Canada
- Education: University of Western Ontario
- Spouse: David Patchell-Evans
Medal record
Women's rowing
Representing Canada
Olympic Games
Silver medal – second place	1996 Atlanta	Single sculls
Bronze medal – third place	1984 Los Angeles	Double sculls
Bronze medal – third place	1992 Barcelona	Single sculls
World Championships
Gold medal – first place	1991 Vienna	Single sculls
Silver medal – second place	1990 Tasmania	Single sculls
Silver medal – second place	1995 Tampere	Single sculls
Pan American Games
Gold medal – first place	1987 Indianapolis	Single sculls
Gold medal – first place	1995 Mar del Plata	Single sculls
Summer Universiade
Bronze medal – third place	1987 Zagreb	Single sculls

Silken Suzette Laumann, MSC (born November 14, 1964) is a Canadian champion rower.

== Life and career ==
Laumann was born in Toronto Township, Ontario, now Mississauga. Starting in 1976, Laumann won a number of awards, including a gold medal in quadruple sculls at the U.S. Championships, two gold medals in single sculls at the Pan American Games, a bronze medal at the 1984 Olympics in the double sculls with her sister Daniele. At the 1988 Olympics, Laumann finished seventh in the double scull. Laumann graduated from the University of Western Ontario in 1989 with a Bachelor of Arts degree. Laumann won a silver medal in single sculls at the 1990 World Championships, and the gold medal at the following year's World Championships.

Arguably the most famous incident in Laumann's life was during her training leading up to the 1992 Summer Olympics. One of the odds-on favourites to capture a gold medal, her shell was involved in a collision with the boat of German coxless pair team Colin von Ettinghausen and Peter Hoeltzenbein on May 15, 1992. Despite serious injuries to her leg (in her words, "The injury looked so bad I actually wondered whether I was going to lose my leg, because I could see the bone."), five operations and a total stay in the hospital of approximately three weeks, Laumann was back on the water training by late June. Her efforts paid off with a bronze medal, and she was subsequently named Canadian of the Year by the Canadian Club in recognition and was selected to carry the Canadian Flag in the closing ceremonies of the Olympics.

After a one-year absence to allow the injury to heal further, Laumann resumed competing in 1994, and she won a silver at the 1995 World Championships. She also won a gold medal as part of a quad sculls team at the 1995 Pan American Games, but was subsequently stripped of the medal after testing positive for pseudoephedrine (which she claimed to have accidentally ingested due to a mix-up in what cold medicine she could safely use). Her final competitive race was at the 1996 Summer Olympics, where Silken won a silver medal in single sculls. She formally announced her retirement three years later.

Laumann was inducted into the Canadian Sports Hall of Fame in 1998 and was awarded the Thomas Keller Medal in 1999 for her outstanding international rowing career. In 2004, she was inducted into the Ontario Sports Hall of Fame.

She now lives in Victoria, British Columbia and works as a public speaker.

== See also ==
- German Canadians
