= Hermenegildo Palacio =

Cuban rower

Personal information
- Full name: Hermenegildo Palacio Cantero
- Nationality: Cuban
- Born: 13 April 1956 (age 70)

Sport
- Sport: Rowing
Medal record
Men's rowing
Representing Cuba
Pan American Games
Gold medal – first place	1979 San Juan	Coxless four

Hermenegildo Palacio Cantero (born 13 April 1956) is a Cuban rower. He competed at the 1976 Summer Olympics and the 1980 Summer Olympics.
