= Jesús Rosello =

Cuban rower

Personal information
- Full name: Jesús Rosello Olivera
- Nationality: Cuban
- Born: 29 September 1946 (age 79)
- Height: 152 cm (5 ft 0 in)
- Weight: 47 kg (104 lb)

Sport
- Sport: Rowing
Medal record
Men's rowing
Representing Cuba
Pan American Games
Bronze medal – third place	1967 Winnipeg	Coxed four
Silver medal – second place	1971 Cali	Coxed pair
Silver medal – second place	1971 Cali	Coxed four
Silver medal – second place	1975 Mexico City	Coxed four

Jesús Rosello Olivera (born 26 September 1946) is a Cuban rowing coxswain. He competed at the 1968 Summer Olympics, 1972 Summer Olympics and the 1976 Summer Olympics.
