= Oswaldo Kuster Neto =

Brazilian rower

Personal information
- Born: 26 April 1965 (age 61) Rio de Janeiro, Brazil

Sport
- Sport: Rowing
Medal record
Representing Brazil
Pan American Games
Bronze medal – third place	1991 Havana	Coxed pairs
Bronze medal – third place	2003 Santo Domingo	Coxless four

Oswaldo Kuster Neto (born 26 April 1965) is a Brazilian rower. He competed at the 1988 Summer Olympics and the 1996 Summer Olympics.
