= Raúl León =

Cuban rower (born 1970)

Personal information
- Full name: Raúl León Domínguez
- Born: 8 March 1970 (age 56) Villa Clara, Cuba

Sport
- Sport: Rowing
Medal record
Men's rowing
Representing Cuba
Pan American Games
Silver medal – second place	1999 Winnipeg	Lwt quadruple sculls
Bronze medal – third place	1999 Winnipeg	Lwt double sculls

Raúl León Domínguez (born 8 March 1970) is a Cuban rower. He competed at the 1996 Summer Olympics and the 2000 Summer Olympics.
