= Steven Segaloff =

American rower

Personal information
- Born: July 21, 1970 (age 56) New Haven, Connecticut, United States

Sport
- Sport: Rowing
Medal record
Men's rowing
Representing United States
World Rowing Championships
Gold medal – first place	1994 Indianapolis	M8+
Bronze medal – third place	1993 Račice	M8+
Bronze medal – third place	1995 Tampere	M8+
Pan American Games
Gold medal – first place	1995 Mar del Plata	M4+
Gold medal – first place	1995 Mar del Plata	M8+

Steven C. Segaloff (born July 21, 1970) is an American rowing cox. He finished 5th in the men's eight at the 1996 Summer Olympics.

== Life and career ==
Segaloff attended Cornell University, where he was active on the university's rowing team. He later attended the University of Chicago Law School where he graduated in 2000 with a J.D. He was an associate at Cravath, Swaine & Moore from 2000 to 2004, and later became Vice President and General Counsel of National Financial Partners. From 2006 to 2013, Segaloff was Deputy General Counsel at Plainfield Asset Management and from 2013 to 2017 General Counsel at Genesys Global. In November 2017, Segaloff founded his own company Bellcote Partners LLC together with co-founder Carl Sheldon.

Steven Segaloff was the cox in the United States men's eight, which became world champion in 1994 and won bronze medals in 1993 and 1995. Segaloff won gold at the Pan-American Games in 1995 with the men's eight and with the men's four. He participated in the 1996 Atlanta Olympics, where his boat finished fifth.
