= Yuleidys Cascaret =

Cuban rower (born 1978)

Personal information
- Born: Yuleidys Cascaret Iznaga; 21 November 1978 (age 47) Guantánamo, Cuba
- Height: 1.89 m (6 ft 2 1/2 in)
- Weight: 90 kg (200 lb)

Sport
- Sport: Rowing
- Club: Guantanamo CR
Medal record
Men's rowing
Representing Cuba
Pan American Games
Gold medal – first place	2003 Santo Domingo	Coxless four
Gold medal – first place	2003 Santo Domingo	Quadruple sculls
Gold medal – first place	2007 Rio de Janeiro	Quadruple sculls
Bronze medal – third place	2003 Santo Domingo	Eight

Yuleidys Cascaret Iznaga (born 21 November 1978) is a Cuban former rower who competed at two Summer Olympics.

== Biography ==
Cascaret, who was born in Guantánamo, won gold medals for Cuba at the 2003 Pan American Games as a member of their coxless four and quadruple sculls teams. At the 2004 Summer Olympics he competed in the singles sculls and made the B final, finishing 12th overall. He won gold again at the 2007 Pan American Games, in the quadruple sculls, the same event that he represented Cuba in at both 2007 World Rowing Championships and the 2008 Summer Olympics.
