= Tracy Duncan =

Canadian rower (born 1971)

Personal information
- Born: 12 November 1971 (age 54) Winnipeg, Manitoba, Canada

Sport
- Sport: Rowing
Medal record
Women's rowing
Representing Canada
World Championships
Silver medal – second place	1993 Račice	Lwt coxless fours
Bronze medal – third place	1999 St. Catharines	Lwt quadruple sculls
Summer Universiade
Gold medal – first place	1993 Buffalo	Lwt double sculls
Pan American Games
Silver medal – second place	1999 Winnipeg	Lwt single sculls
Bronze medal – third place	1999 Winnipeg	Lwt quadruple sculls

Tracy Duncan (born 12 November 1971) is a Canadian rower. She competed in the women's lightweight double sculls event at the 2000 Summer Olympics.
