= Chris Kerber =

American rower (born 1968)

Christopher Kerber
Current position
- Title: Head coach
- Team: Hobart College

Biographical details
- Born: July 23, 1968 (age 58); Mount Laurel, New Jersey, U.S.

Coaching career (HC unless noted)
- 2023–present: Hobart College
- 2009–2022: Cornell University

Accomplishments and honors

Championships
- 4 Intercollegiate Rowing Association (2014, 2015, 2017, 2019); 3 Eastern Sprints (2014, 2015, 2017)

Awards
- 4× IRA Coach of the Year (2014, 2015, 2017, 2019); 3× EARC Lightweight Coach of the Year (2014, 2015, 2017); 2x Ivy League Lightweight Coach of the Year (2015, 2017)

Medal record

Men's rowing

Representing United States

World Championships
Gold medal – first place	1993 Račice	Lwt men's four
Gold medal – first place	1999 St. Catharines	Lwt men's eight

Pan American Games
Gold medal – first place	1995 Mar del Plata	Lwt coxless pair

Christopher Kerber (born July 23, 1968) is an American lightweight rower. At Temple University, he won four medals at the Dad Vail Regatta before setting his sights on a competitive career that would span a decade. Chris was a member of Pi Lambda Phi Fraternity. In 2020, Kerber was inducted into the Temple Athletics Hall of Fame.

He won a gold medal at the 1993 World Rowing Championships in Račice with the lightweight men's four. Kerber is currently the Head Coach of Men's Rowing at Hobart and William Smith Colleges. Prior to Hobart, Kerber coached in numerous programs, including Cornell Lightweights and LaSalle College High School in Philadelphia. Kerber's Cornell lightweight varsity eights won the Intercollegiate Rowing Association (IRA) national championship in 2014, 2015, 2017, and 2019. His teams won the Jope Cup in 2014 and 2015.

In 2014, Kerber's Cornell crew were Temple Challenge Cup semi-finalists at Henley Royal Regatta, falling to the eventual champions Oxford Brookes University. In 2015, Kerber's varsity crew returned to Henley, again reaching the semi-final of the Temple Challenge Cup, where they fell to the eventual champions A.S.R. Nereus.
