= Roberto Ojeda =

Cuban rower

Personal information
- Born: 14 March 1942 (age 84) Camarioca, Cuba

Sport
- Sport: Rowing
Medal record
Representing Cuba
Pan American Games
Gold medal – first place	1991 Havana	Coxed pairs
Gold medal – first place	1991 Havana	Coxed fours
Gold medal – first place	1991 Havana	Eights
Central American and Caribbean Games
Gold medal – first place	1986 Santiago	Coxed fours
Gold medal – first place	1986 Santiago	Eights
Gold medal – first place	1990 Mexico City	Coxed fours
Silver medal – second place	1990 Mexico City	Eights

Roberto Ojeda González (born 14 March 1942) is a Cuban rower. He competed at the 1964 Summer Olympics, 1968 Summer Olympics and the 1992 Summer Olympics.
