= Alexander Altair Soares =

Brazilian rower (born 1975)

Alexander Soares
Personal information
- Full name: Alexander Altair Soares
- Born: 30 August 1975 (age 50) Florianópolis, Brazil

Sport
- Sport: Rowing
Medal record
Men's rowing
Representing Argentina
Pan American Games
| Silver medal – second place | 1999 Winnipeg | Coxless pair |
| Silver medal – second place | 2003 Santo Domingo | Coxless pair |

Alexander Altair Soares (born 30 August 1975) is a Brazilian former rower. He competed in the men's quadruple sculls event at the 1996 Summer Olympics.
