= Martha García (rower) =

Mexican rower (born 1965)

Personal information
- Born: 23 February 1965 (age 61) Mexico City, Mexico

Sport
- Sport: Rowing
Medal record
Representing Mexico
Pan American Games
Gold medal – first place	1987 Indianapolis	Double sculls
Gold medal – first place	1991 Havana	Double sculls
Silver medal – second place	1991 Havana	Single sculls
Bronze medal – third place	1987 Indianapolis	Single sculls
Bronze medal – third place	1991 Havana	Quadruple sculls
Central American and Caribbean Games
Gold medal – first place	1986 Santiago	Single sculls
Gold medal – first place	1986 Santiago	Double sculls
Gold medal – first place	1990 Mexico City	Single sculls
Gold medal – first place	1990 Mexico City	Double sculls
Gold medal – first place	1990 Mexico City	Quadruple sculls
Gold medal – first place	1993 Ponce	Single sculls
Gold medal – first place	1993 Ponce	Double sculls
Silver medal – second place	1993 Quadruple sculls	{{{2}}}

Martha Aurora García Mayo (born 23 February 1965) is a Mexican rower. She competed at the 1992 Summer Olympics and the 2004 Summer Olympics.
