= Rude and Smooth =

The "Rude and Smooth" crew was the Harvard Varsity Men's 8+ in 1974 and 1975.

In addition to their undefeated seasons, these crews captured the unofficial national championships in both years, and went on to place second to the British National team in the Henley Royal Regatta, beating the boat that was essentially the US National Team on the way in 1975. Various members of the team still row in the Head of the Charles Regatta every year, competing as The Rude and Smooth Boatclub. In 1998, the crews were inducted into the Harvard Athletic Hall of Fame, Class of 1998.
