= Wendy Wiebe =

Canadian rower

Personal information
- Full name: Wendy Lynn Wiebe
- Born: June 6, 1965 (age 61) St. Catharines, Ontario, Canada

Sport
- Sport: Rowing
Medal record
Women's rowing
Representing Canada
World Championships
Gold medal – first place	1993 Racice	LW2x
Gold medal – first place	1994 Indianapolis	LW2x
Gold medal – first place	1995 Tampere	LW2x
Bronze medal – third place	1990 Tasmania	LW2x
Bronze medal – third place	1992 Montreal	LW1x
Pan American Games
Silver medal – second place	1995 Mar del Plata	LW1x
Commonwealth Games
Bronze medal – third place	1986 Edinburgh	LW4-
Summer Universiade
Gold medal – first place	1993 Buffalo	LW1x

Wendy Lynn Wiebe (born June 6, 1965) is a Canadian rower. She competed in the women's lightweight double sculls event at the 1996 Summer Olympics.
