= Hugo Aberastegui =

Argentine rower (born 1941)

Personal information
- Nationality: Argentine
- Born: 28 September 1941 (age 83)
- Height: 1.86 m (6 ft 1 in)
- Weight: 84 kg (185 lb)

Sport
- Sport: Rowing

Hugo Raúl Aberastegui (born 28 September 1941) is an Argentine rower. He competed in the 1968, 1972, and 1976 Summer Olympics.
