= Shannon Crawford =

Canadian rower (born 1963)

Personal information
- Born: September 12, 1963 (age 62) Guelph, Ontario, Canada

Sport
- Sport: Rowing
Medal record
Representing Canada
Olympic Games
| Gold medal – first place | 1992 Barcelona | Eight |
Pan American Games
| Silver medal – second place | 1991 Havana | Coxless fours |

Shannon Crawford (born September 12, 1963) is a Canadian rower. She won a gold medal at the 1992 Summer Olympics in Barcelona, in the women's eight.
