= Marcos Morales =

Argentine rower

Personal information
- Full name: Marcos César Morales Sarmiento
- Born: 4 January 1976 (age 50) Buenos Aires, Argentina

Sport
- Sport: Rowing
Medal record
Men's rowing
Representing Argentina
Pan American Games
Gold medal – first place	2003 Santo Domingo	Coxless pair
Silver medal – second place	1999 Winnipeg	Eight

Marcos César Morales Sarmiento (Note: In this Hispanic American name, the first or paternal surname is Morales and the second or maternal family name is Sarmiento.) (born 4 January 1976) is an Argentine former rower. He competed in the men's coxless pair event at the 2004 Summer Olympics.
