= Chris Swan (rower) =

American rower

Personal information
- Nationality: American
- Born: Chris Swan; September 24, 1967 (age 58)

Sport
- Country: United States
- Sport: Rowing
- Club: Harvard
Medal record
Men's Rowing
Pan American Games
Gold medal – first place	1995 Mar del Plata	Coxed four
Silver medal – second place	1995 Mar del Plata	Coxed pair
World Rowing Championships
Silver medal – second place	1994 Indianapolis	Coxed four

Chris Swan (born September 24, 1967) is an American former rower.

== Biography ==
Swan hails from Simsbury, Connecticut and is a graduate of Harvard University. He was an alternate for the United States at the 1992 Summer Olympics in Barcelona, not getting a chance to row. At the 1994 World Rowing Championships he was a member of the American team which finished second behind Romania in the coxed four final. He won two medals at the 1995 Pan American Games in Mar Del Plata, a gold in the coxed four and silver in the coxed pair.
