= Federico Querín =

Argentine rower

Personal information
- Full name: Federico Luis Querín
- Nationality: Argentine
- Born: 10 September 1966 (age 59)

Sport
- Sport: Rowing
Medal record
Representing Argentina
Pan American Games
Silver medal – second place	1987 Indianapolis	Lwt double sculls
Silver medal – second place	1991 Havana	Lwt double sculls
Silver medal – second place	1995 Mar del Plata	Lwt eights

Federico Luis Querín (born 10 September 1966) is an Argentine rower. He competed in the men's lightweight coxless four event at the 1996 Summer Olympics.
