= Rowing at the 2003 Pan American Games =

A range of men's and women's rowing events took place at the 2003 Pan American Games in Centro de Remo y Canotaje Presa de Rincón in August 2003.

== Men's events ==
| Event | Gold | Silver | Bronze |
|---|---|---|---|
| Single sculls | Yoennis Hernández; Cuba | Santiago Fernández; Argentina | Andrew Liverman; United States |
| Double sculls | Cuba; Yosbel Martínez; Yoennis Hernández | Brazil; Anderson Nocetti; Marcelus dos Santos | United States; Conal Groom; Sloan DuRoss |
| Lightweight double sculls | Cuba; Yunior Pérez; Armando Arrechavaleta | Brazil; José Carlos Sobral; Thiago Gomes | Guatemala |
| Quadruple sculls | Cuba | Uruguay | Brazil; Anderson Nocetti; Marcelus dos Santos; Allan Bittencourt; Leandro Tozzo |
| Lightweight quadruple sculls | Cuba | Brazil; Rui Valle; Gustavo Santos; João Borges; Ronaldo Vargas | United States |
| Coxless pair | Argentina; Walter Martín Naneder; Marcos César Morales | Brazil; Alexandre Soares; Gibran Cunha | Cuba; Manuel Cascaret; Luis Cruz |
| Coxless four | Cuba | United States | Brazil; Alexandre Soares; Gibran Cunha; Oswaldo Kuster Neto; Claudiomar Iung |
| Lightweight coxless four | Chile | Canada | Cuba |
| Eight | United States | Canada | Cuba |

=== Women's events ===
| Event | Gold | Silver | Bronze |
|---|---|---|---|
| Single sculls | Mayra González; Cuba | Fiona Milne; Canada | Caroline Bishop; United States |
| Double sculls | Canada; Marilyn Taylor; Stacey Norwood | United States; Catherine Humblet; Kathryn Madigan | Chile; María Orellana; Soraya Jadue |
| Lightweight single sculls | Ismaray Marrero; Cuba | Gen Meredith; Canada | Melissa Rice; United States |
| Lightweight double sculls | Canada; Gen Meredith; Fiona Milne | Cuba; Dailin Taset; Marlenis Mesa | United States; Anne Finke; Sarah Hirst |
| Lightweight quadruple sculls | Cuba | United States | Mexico |
