= Karen Klinger =

American rower (born 1965)

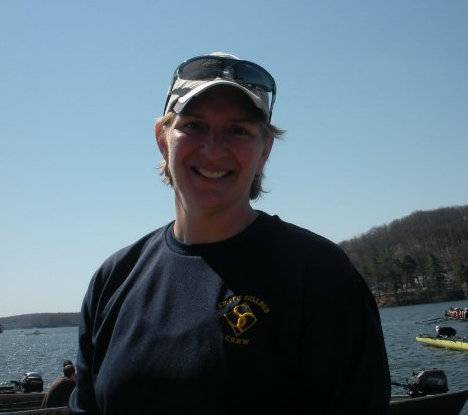

Personal information
- Born: August 17, 1965 (age 60)

Sport
- Sport: Rowing
Medal record
Representing the United States
Pan American Games
Gold medal – first place	1991 Havana	Quad scull

Karen Klinger (née Carpenter; August 17, 1965) is a female rower from the United States. Klinger rowed for the Smith College crew team from 1983 until 1987. In 1985, she was a member of the Varsity 8 which, with the Junior Varsity and Novice 8, won three first place medals at the Valley Championships. In 1986, she was a member of the Varsity 8 crew that finished first at the Valley Championships.

Klinger competed for the United States at the 1991 Pan American Games in Havana, where she was a member of the women's quad that won a gold medal. In 1992 Klinger participated in the Olympic trials.

Klinger was the head coach of the Smith College crew team starting in 1997, but has since been succeeded by Clare Doyle in the year 2017. Before this, she coached at Brookline High School, Tufts University, Northeastern University, and the University of Delaware. She has led the Smith College crew team to 8 conference wins at the Seven Sisters Championships, and has brought the team to the NCAA Division III Rowing Championships in 1998, 2002, 2004–06, and 2009. The team finished second in 2004 and 2005, fourth in 2006, and sixth in 2009.
