= Paulo Carvalho (rower) =

Uruguayan rower (born 1935)

Personal information
- Born: 13 March 1935 (age 90); Salto, Uruguay

Sport
- Sport: Rowing

Paulo Carvalho (born 13 March 1935) is a Uruguayan rower. He competed at the 1956 Summer Olympics and the 1960 Summer Olympics. He medaled in the 1959 Pan American Games.
