= Soraya Jadué =

Chilean rower (born 1975)

Personal information
- Born: 5 February 1975 (age 51) Valdivia, Chile
- Height: 1.78 m (5 ft 10 in)
- Weight: 70 kg (150 lb)

Sport
- Country: Chile
- Sport: Rowing
Medal record
Women's rowing
Representing Chile
Pan American Games
Gold medal – first place	2019 Lima	Quadruple sculls
Bronze medal – third place	2015 Toronto	Single sculls
Bronze medal – third place	2019 Lima	Single sculls

Soraya Jadué (born 5 February 1975) is a Chilean rower. She competed in the women's single sculls event at the 2000 Summer Olympics in Sydney, 2004 Summer Olympics in Athens, and the 2008 Summer Olympics in Beijing. She was also the national flag bearer in the 2008 Olympic closing ceremony.

Jadué was honoured by the Mayor of Valdivia, Omar Sabat, as she retired from the sport in 2015. She had won the bronze medal at the 2015 Pan American Games in Toronto.
