= Cuba at the 1999 Pan American Games =

- IOC code: CUB
- NOC: Cuban Olympic Committee

in Winnipeg 23 July – 8 August 1999
- Medals Ranked 2nd: Gold 70 Silver 40 Bronze 47 Total 157

Pan American Games appearances (overview)
- 1951; 1955; 1959; 1963; 1967; 1971; 1975; 1979; 1983; 1987; 1991; 1995; 1999; 2003; 2007; 2011; 2015; 2019; 2023

The 13th Pan American Games were held in Winnipeg, Manitoba, Canada from July 23 to August 8, 1999.

== Medals ==
=== Gold ===
===== Boxing =====
- Men's Light Flyweight (– 48 kg): Maikro Romero
- Men's Featherweight (– 57 kg): Yudel Johnson
- Men's Lightweight (– 60 kg): Mario Kindelán
- Men's Welterweight (– 67 kg): Juan Hernández Sierra
- Men's Light Middleweight (– 71 kg): Jorge Gutiérrez
- Men's Middleweight (– 75 kg): Yohanson Martínez
- Men's Light Heavyweight (– 81 kg): Humberto Savigne
- Men's Heavyweight (– 91 kg): Odlanier Solis
- Men's Super Heavyweight (+ 91 kg): Alexis Rubalcaba

===== Handball =====
- Men's Team Competition: Cuba men's national handball team

===== Judo =====
- Men's Extra-Lightweight (– 60 kg): Manolo Poulot
- Men's Half-Middleweight (– 81 kg): Gabriel Arteaga
- Men's Heavyweight (+ 100 kg): Ángel Sánchez
- Women's Extra-Lightweight (– 48 kg): Amarilis Savón
- Women's Half-Lightweight (– 52 kg): Legna Verdecia
- Women's Lightweight (– 57 kg): Driulis González
- Women's Middleweight (– 70 kg): Sibelis Veranes
- Women's Half-Heavyweight (– 78 kg): Diadenis Luna
- Women's Heavyweight (+ 78 kg): Daima Beltrán

===== Karate =====
- Men's Kumite (– 60 kg): Yusey Padron
- Women's Kumite (– 53 kg): Beisy Quintana

=== Silver ===
===== Judo =====
- Men's Half-Heavyweight (– 100 kg): Yosvani Kessel

=== Bronze ===
===== Boxing =====
- Men's Flyweight (– 51 kg): Manuel Mantilla
- Men's Bantamweight (– 54 kg): Waldemar Font
- Men's Light Welterweight (– 63.5 kg): Diógenes Luña

===== Handball =====
- Women's Team Competition: Cuba women's national handball team

===== Judo =====
- Men's Half-Lightweight (– 66 kg): Yordanis Arencibia
- Men's Lightweight (– 73 kg): Israel Hernández
- Men's Middleweight (– 90 kg): Yosvany Despaigne
- Women's Half-Middleweight (– 63 kg): Kenia Rodríguez

===== Karate =====
- Men's Kumite (– 65 kg): Enrique Vilela
- Men's Kumite (– 80 kg): Bravo Rodríguez
- Men's Kumite (+ 80 kg): Yoel Díaz

== Results by event ==
=== Basketball ===
==== Men's team competition ====
- Team Roster
  - Yudit Abreu
  - Roberto Amaro
  - Edel Casanova
  - Sergio Ferrer
  - Andrés González
  - Radbel Hechevarria
  - Angel Nuñez
  - Elieser Rojas
  - Ariel Ruedas
  - Ernesto Simon
  - Juan Vazquez
  - Amiel Vega

== See also ==
- Cuba at the 2000 Summer Olympics
