= Rowing at the 1987 Pan American Games =

The rowing competition at the 1987 Pan American Games in Indianapolis, Indiana, took place at Eagle Creek Park. The competition was notable for including a full slate of events in the lightweight division.

== Men's events ==
Event	Gold	Silver	Bronze
Single sculls	Jesús Posse; Uruguay	Joaquín Gómez; Mexico	Elexey Marrero; Cuba
Double sculls	Greg Walker & John Biglow; United States	Chile; Chile	Argentina; Argentina
Lightweight singles sculls	Paul Fuchs; United States	Osmany Martinez; Cuba	Edgar Nanne; Guatemala
Lightweight double sculls	Brian Thome & John Murphy; Canada	Jorge Lamo & Federico Querin; Argentina	Robert Dreher & Michael Dreher; United States
Coxless pair	Ricardo Carvalho & Ronaldo Carvalho; Brazil	Jamie Schaffer & Darby Berkhout; Canada	Daniel Scurt & Caludio Aguilla; Argentina
Lightweight coxless pair	Argentina; Argentina	Canada; Canada	João Deboni & José Augusto Almeida; Brazil
Coxless four	Cuba; Cuba	United States; Dan Gehn; Wis Brian Colgan; John Strobeck; Scott Erwin	Canada; Canada
Lightweight coxless four	United States; Dan McGill; Russel Lane; Donald Tower; Eric Rosow	Mexico; Mexico	Canada; Canada
Coxed eight	United States of America; United States	Brazil; Brazil	Canada; Canada

== Women's events ==
Event	Gold	Silver	Bronze
Single sculls	Silken Laumann; Canada	Gretchen Weimer; United States	Martha García; Mexico
Double sculls	Martha García & Ana Gamble; Mexico	Jennie Marshall & Holly Kays; United States	Karen Ashford & Connie Delise; Canada
Coxless pair	Canada; Canada	United States of America; United States	Cuba; Cuba
Lightweight single sculls	Michèle Murphy; Canada	Merri Lisa Trigilo; United States	Verónica Schreiber; Mexico
Lightweight double sculls	Susan Cooper & Peggy Johnston; United States	Canada; Canada	Mexico; Mexico
Lightweight coxless Pair	United States of America; United States	Canada; Canada	Cuba; Cuba

== Medal table ==
Place	Nation	Gold medal	Silver medal	Bronze medal	Total
1	United States	6	5	1	12
2	Canada	4	4	4	12
3	Mexico	1	2	3	6
4	Cuba	1	1	3	5
5	Argentina	1	1	2	4
6	Brazil	1	1	1	3
7	Uruguay	1	0	0	1
8	Chile	0	1	0	1
9	Guatemala	0	0	1	1
Total		15	15	15	45
