= Rowing at the 1995 Pan American Games =

Fourteen men's and seven women's rowing events took place at the 1995 Pan American Games in Mar del Plata, Argentina. The gold medals were won by rowers from the United States, Canada, Cuba and Argentina.The canoeing competitions at the 1995 Pan American Games took place in Mar Del Plata, Argentina.

== Men's events ==
Event	Gold	Silver	Bronze
Single sculls	Sergio Abel Fernández; Argentina	Cyrus Beasley; United States	Leonides Samé Sánchez; Cuba
Double sculls	Argentina; Argentina	Brazil; Brazil	Canada; Canada
Lightweight single sculls	Osmani Martín Hernández; Cuba	Adam Oliver; El Salvador	James Brambel; Canada
Lightweight double sculls	United States; Barry Klein; Christopher Schulten	Cuba; Cuba	Canada; Canada
Lightweight quadruple sculls	Cuba; Cuba	United States of America; United States	Mexico; Mexico
Quadruple sculls	Argentina; Argentina	United States; David Gleeson; Jason Galles; Brian Jamieson; Tim Young	Cuba; Cuba
Lightweight coxless pair	United States of America; United States; Chris Kerber; Andy Finch	Canada; Canada	Mexico; Mexico
Lightweight fours	United States; Kane Larin; John Velyvis; Greg Klingsporn; Jonathan Moss	Canada; Canada	Guatemala; Guatemala
Lightweight eights	United States of America; United States; Peter Cipollone; Steve Gantz; John Velyvis; Dave Collins; Steve Gantz; Ed Grose; Tom Grace; Kane Larin; Greg Klingsporn	Argentina; Argentina	Cuba; Cuba
Coxless pair-oared shells	United States; Don Smith; Fred Honebein	Argentina; Argentina	Brazil; Brazil
Coxed pair-oared shells	Cuba; Cuba	United States; Tom Murray; Chris Swan	Argentina; Argentina
Coxless four oared shells	United States; Steven Segaloff; Jeffrey Klepacki; Tom Murray; Chris Swan; Jim Neil	Canada; Canada; Phil Graham; Adam Parfitt; Ken Kozel; Greg Stevenson	Cuba; Cuba
Coxed four oared shells	United States of America; United States	Canada; Canada	Cuba; Cuba
Eight oared shells	United States; Steven Segaloff; Jeffrey Klepacki; Jamie Koven; Jon Brown; Don Smith; Bob Koehler; Chip McKibben; Fred Honebein; Sean Hail	Canada; Canada	Cuba; Cuba

== Women's events ==
Event	Gold	Silver	Bronze
Single sculls	Silken Laumann; Canada	Ruth Davidon; United States	María Garisoain; Argentina
Double sculls	Canada; Canada	United States of America; United States	Cuba; Cuba
Coxless pair	United States; Mary McCogg; Betsy McCogg	Cuba; Cuba	Argentina; Argentina
Lightweight single sculls	María Garisoain; Argentina	Wendy Wiebe; Canada	Andrea Boltz; Mexico
Lightweight double sculls	Argentina; Argentina	Barb Spitz; Izzy Brown Gordon; United States	Mexico; Mexico
Quadruple sculls	Cuba; Cuba	United States; United States	Argentina; Argentina
Lightweight coxless pair	United States; Ellen Minzner; Christine Smith	Mexico; Mexico	Argentina; Argentina

== Medal table ==
Place	Nation	Gold medal	Silver medal	Bronze medal	Total
1	United States	10	8	0	18
2	Argentina	5	2	5	12
3	Cuba	4	2	7	13
4	Canada	2	6	3	11
5	Mexico	0	1	4	5
6	Brazil	0	1	1	2
7	El Salvador	0	1	0	1
8	Guatemala	0	0	1	1
Total		21	21	21	63
