= Rowing at the Pan American Games =

- No. of events: 14 (men: 8; women: 6)

Rowing has been a sport of the Pan American Games since the 1951 games.

== Medal table ==
Updated after the 2023 Pan American Games.

Rank	Nation	Gold	Silver	Bronze	Total
1	United States	65	64	31	160
2	Argentina	46	31	32	109
3	Cuba	42	30	44	116
4	Canada	34	40	32	106
5	Mexico	12	11	28	51
6	Chile	10	12	14	36
7	Brazil	9	23	16	48
8	Uruguay	5	5	6	16
9	El Salvador	0	1	1	2
10	Trinidad and Tobago	0	1	0	1
11	Guatemala	0	0	4	4
11	Peru	0	0	4	4
13	Paraguay	0	0	2	2
13	Venezuela	0	0	2	2
Totals (14 entries)		223	218	216	657

== See also ==
- List of Pan American Games medalists in rowing
