= Danchev =

Danchev (feminine: Dancheva) is a Bulgarian-language surname literally meaning "son/daughter of Dancho", with the latter being a diminutive of Daniel. Notable people with this surname include:

- Andrey Danchev
- Ivaylo Danchev
- Maria Dancheva
- Vladimir Danchev
- Yordan Danchev
