= Rowing at the 1992 Summer Olympics – Men's double sculls =

Men's double sculls at the Games of the XXV Olympiad
- Date: 27 July – 1 August 1992
- Competitors: 39 from 19 nations

Medalists
1st place, gold medalist(s)		Peter Antonie; Stephen Hawkins	Australia
2nd place, silver medalist(s)		Arnold Jonke; Christoph Zerbst	Austria
3rd place, bronze medalist(s)		Nico Rienks; Henk-Jan Zwolle	Netherlands

The men's double sculls competition at the 1992 Summer Olympics took place at took place at Lake of Banyoles, Spain.

== Competition format ==
The competition consisted of three main rounds (heats, semifinals, and finals) as well as a repechage. The 19 boats were divided into four heats for the first round, with 4 or 5 boats in each heat. The winner of each heat (4 boats total) advanced directly to the semifinals. The remaining 15 boats were placed in the repechage. The repechage featured four heats, with 3 or 4 boats in each heat. The top two boats in each repechage heat (8 boats total) advanced to the main semifinals. The remaining 7 boats (3rd and 4th placers in the repechage heats) were placed in the consolation semifinals.

The 12 main semifinalist boats were divided into two heats of 6 boats each. The top three boats in each semifinal (6 boats total) advanced to the "A" final to compete for medals and 4th through 6th place; the bottom three boats in each semifinal were sent to the "B" final for 7th through 12th.

For the consolation semifinals, the 7 boats were placed into two heats of 3 and 4 boats each. The last-place boat in each consolation semifinal went to the "D" final to compete for 18th and 19th places; the remaining 5 boats advanced to the "C" final to contest 13th through 17th places.

All races were over a 2000 metre course.

== Results ==
=== Heats ===
==== Heat 1 ====
Rank	Rowers	Nation	Time	Notes
1	Arnold Jonke; Christoph Zerbst	Austria	6:40.19	Q
2	Per Andersson; Mattias Lindgren	Sweden	6:43.44	R
3	Max Holdo; Guillermo Pfaab	Argentina	7:05.49	R
4	Ivaylo Banchev; Yordan Danchev	Bulgaria	7:13.50	R
5	Chiang Wing Hung; Lui Kam Chi	Hong Kong	7:14.87	R

==== Heat 2 ====
Rank	Rowers	Nation	Time	Notes
1	Nico Rienks; Henk-Jan Zwolle	Netherlands	6:31.90	Q
2	Miguel Álvarez; José Antonio Merín	Spain	6:32.67	R
3	Zsolt Dani; Zsolt Lévai	Hungary	6:42.80	R
4	Roman Lutoškin; Priit Tasane	Estonia	6:44.79	R
5	Eduardo Arrillaga; Luis Miguel García	Mexico	6:55.93	R

==== Heat 3 ====
Rank	Rowers	Nation	Time	Notes
1	Christian Händle; Peter Uhrig	Germany	6:28.24	Q
2	Jon Smith; Gregory Springer	United States	6:33.59	R
3	Esko Hillebrandt; Reima Karppinen	Finland	6:36.77	R
4	René Gonin; Alexander Koch	Switzerland	6:46.64	R
5	Daniel Alves; João Fernando Santos	Portugal	6:54.55	R

==== Heat 4 ====
Rank	Rowers	Nation	Time	Notes
1	Peter Antonie; Stephen Hawkins	Australia	6:24.93	Q
2	Don Dickison; Todd Hallett	Canada	6:28.84	R
3	Andrzej Krzepiński; Andrzej Marszałek	Poland	6:33.51	R
4	Leonid Shaposhnykov; Oleksandr Slobodeniuk	Unified Team	6:37.97	R

=== Repechage ===
==== Repechage 1 ====
Rank	Rowers	Nation	Time	Notes
1	Zsolt Dani; Zsolt Lévai	Hungary	6:42.31	Q
2	René Gonin; Alexander Koch	Switzerland	6:42.47	Q
3	Per Andersson; Mattias Lindgren	Sweden	6:42.96	C

==== Repechage 2 ====
Rank	Rowers	Nation	Time	Notes
1	Miguel Álvarez; José Antonio Merín	Spain	6:43.28	Q
2	Leonid Shaposhnykov; Oleksandr Slobodeniuk	Unified Team	6:45.51	Q
3	Esko Hillebrandt; Reima Karppinen	Finland	6:53.42	C
4	Chiang Wing Hung; Lui Kam Chi	Hong Kong	7:20.92	C

==== Repechage 3 ====
Rank	Rowers	Nation	Time	Notes
1	Andrzej Krzepiński; Andrzej Marszałek	Poland	6:41.27	Q
2	Jon Smith; Gregory Springer	United States	6:43.79	Q
3	Eduardo Arrillaga; Luis Miguel García	Mexico	6:48.86	C
4	Ivaylo Banchev; Yordan Danchev	Bulgaria	6:52.43	C

==== Repechage 4 ====
Rank	Rowers	Nation	Time	Notes
1	Don Dickison; Todd Hallett	Canada	6:36.52	Q
2	Roman Lutoškin; Priit Tasane	Estonia	6:38.58	Q
3	Max Holdo; Guillermo Pfaab	Argentina	6:44.27	C
4	Daniel Alves; João Fernando Santos	Portugal	6:46.14	C

=== Semifinals ===
==== Semifinal 1 ====
Rank	Rowers	Nation	Time	Notes
1	Arnold Jonke; Christoph Zerbst	Austria	6:18.52	QA
2	Nico Rienks; Henk-Jan Zwolle	Netherlands	6:19.15	QA
3	Andrzej Krzepiński; Andrzej Marszałek	Poland	6:19.98	QA
4	Don Dickison; Todd Hallett	Canada	6:20.99	QB
5	Leonid Shaposhnykov; Oleksandr Slobodeniuk	Unified Team	6:34.24	QB
6	René Gonin; Alexander Koch	Switzerland	6:37.80	QB

==== Semifinal 2 ====
Rank	Rowers	Nation	Time	Notes
1	Peter Antonie; Stephen Hawkins	Australia	6:20.22	QA
2	Roman Lutoškin; Priit Tasane	Estonia	6:21.42	QA
3	Miguel Álvarez; José Antonio Merín	Spain	6:22.36	QA
4	Christian Händle; Jens Köppen	Germany	6:23.61	QB
5	Jon Smith; Gregory Springer	United States	6:26.69	QB
6	Zsolt Dani; Zsolt Lévai	Hungary	6:31.46	QB

=== Consolation semifinals ===
==== Semifinal 3 ====
Rank	Rowers	Nation	Time	Notes
1	Esko Hillebrandt; Reima Karppinen	Finland	6:27.92	QC
2	Ivaylo Banchev; Yordan Danchev	Bulgaria	6:30.77	QC
3	Per Andersson; Mattias Lindgren	Sweden	6:30.93	QC
4	Daniel Alves; João Fernando Santos	Portugal	6:32.01	QD

==== Semifinal 4 ====
Rank	Rowers	Nation	Time	Notes
1	Max Holdo; Guillermo Pfaab	Argentina	6:41.39	QC
2	Eduardo Arrillaga; Luis Miguel García	Mexico	6:45.65	QC
3	Chiang Wing Hung; Lui Kam Chi	Hong Kong	6:51.82	QD

=== Finals ===
==== Final D ====
Rank	Rowers	Nation	Time
18	Daniel Alves; João Fernando Santos	Portugal	6:42.00
19	Chiang Wing Hung; Lui Kam Chi	Hong Kong	7:00.90

==== Final C ====
Rank	Rowers	Nation	Time
13	Esko Hillebrandt; Reima Karppinen	Finland	6:30.93
14	Max Holdo; Guillermo Pfaab	Argentina	6:35.83
15	Eduardo Arrillaga; Luis Miguel García	Mexico	6:36.00
16	Ivaylo Banchev; Yordan Danchev	Bulgaria	6:36.57
17	Per Andersson; Mattias Lindgren	Sweden	6:41.37

==== Final B ====
Rank	Rowers	Nation	Time
7	Don Dickison; Todd Hallett	Canada	6:22.84
8	Christian Händle; Jens Köppen	Germany	6:24.27
9	Jon Smith; Gregory Springer	United States	6:26.67
10	Zsolt Dani; Zsolt Lévai	Hungary	6:27.23
11	René Gonin; Alexander Koch	Switzerland	6:29.94
12	Leonid Shaposhnykov; Oleksandr Slobodeniuk	Unified Team	6:36.73

==== Final A ====
Rank	Rowers	Nation	Time
1st place, gold medalist(s)	Peter Antonie; Stephen Hawkins	Australia	6:17.32
2nd place, silver medalist(s)	Arnold Jonke; Christoph Zerbst	Austria	6:18.42
3rd place, bronze medalist(s)	Nico Rienks; Henk-Jan Zwolle	Netherlands	6:22.82
4	Roman Lutoškin; Priit Tasane	Estonia	6:23.34
5	Andrzej Krzepiński; Andrzej Marszałek	Poland	6:24.32
6	Miguel Álvarez; José Antonio Merín	Spain	6:26.96

== Final classification ==
The following rowers took part:

Rank	Rowers	Country
1st place, gold medalist(s)	Peter Antonie; Stephen Hawkins	Australia
2nd place, silver medalist(s)	Arnold Jonke; Christoph Zerbst	Austria
3rd place, bronze medalist(s)	Nico Rienks; Henk-Jan Zwolle	Netherlands
	Priit Tasane; Roman Lutoškin	Estonia
	Andrzej Marszałek; Andrzej Krzepiński	Poland
	Miguel Álvarez; José Antonio Merín	Spain
	Don Dickison; Todd Hallett	Canada
	Peter Uhrig (heat)/Jens Köppen (semi final and final); Christian Händle	Germany
	Gregory Springer; Jon Smith	United States
	Zsolt Dani; Zsolt Lévai	Hungary
	René Gonin; Alexander Koch	Switzerland
	Oleksandr Slobodeniuk; Leonid Shaposhnykov	Unified Team
	Esko Hillebrandt; Reima Karppinen	Finland
	Max Holdo; Guillermo Pfaab	Argentina
	Eduardo Arrillaga; Luis Miguel García	Mexico
	Yordan Danchev; Ivaylo Banchev	Bulgaria
	Mattias Lindgren; Per Andersson	Sweden
	Daniel Alves; João Fernando Santos	Portugal
	Lui Kam Chi; Chiang Wing Hung	Hong Kong
