= Burgruine Rauchenkatsch =

Castle site near Krems in Carinthia, Austria

Coordinates: 46°58′48″N 13°37′20″E

- Carinthia, Austria

Site information
- Type: Rock castle
- Condition: Levelled

Location
- Height: 1,050 m (3,440 ft)

Site history
- Built: 12th century
- Built by: Archbishopric of Salzburg

Rauchenkatsch is a castle site near Krems in Carinthia, Austria. The medieval fortress was first mentioned in an 1197 deed; it was built at the behest of the Archbishops of Salzburg to control the historic trade route across Katschberg Pass.

== History ==
In 1007 King Henry II of Germany granted the surrounding estates to the Bishops of Freising. However, the Freising bishops had little interest in the remote area and soon after ceded it to the Archbishopric of Salzburg. In an exchange contract signed in 1197 with the Benedictine monks of Millstatt Abbey, the castle appeared as castrum chaetze; it was possibly erected at the site of a Roman fortress.

Demolished by an earthquake in 1201, the castle was soon after rebuilt. Mentioned as Rouhenkaze in 1241 deed, the castle was staffed with Salzburg ministeriales who effectively controlled the movement of travellers and goods across the Hohe Tauern mountain range on the road from Radstadt and Mauterndorf down to the Carinthian town of Gmünd. Rauchenkatsch was finally sold by Prince-Archbishop Wolf Dietrich Raitenau in 1605 and decayed afterwards. The last remnants were destroyed during the preparatory work for the construction of the Tauern Autobahn in 1967.

== See also ==
- List of castles in Austria
