= Rennweg am Katschberg =

- Municipality
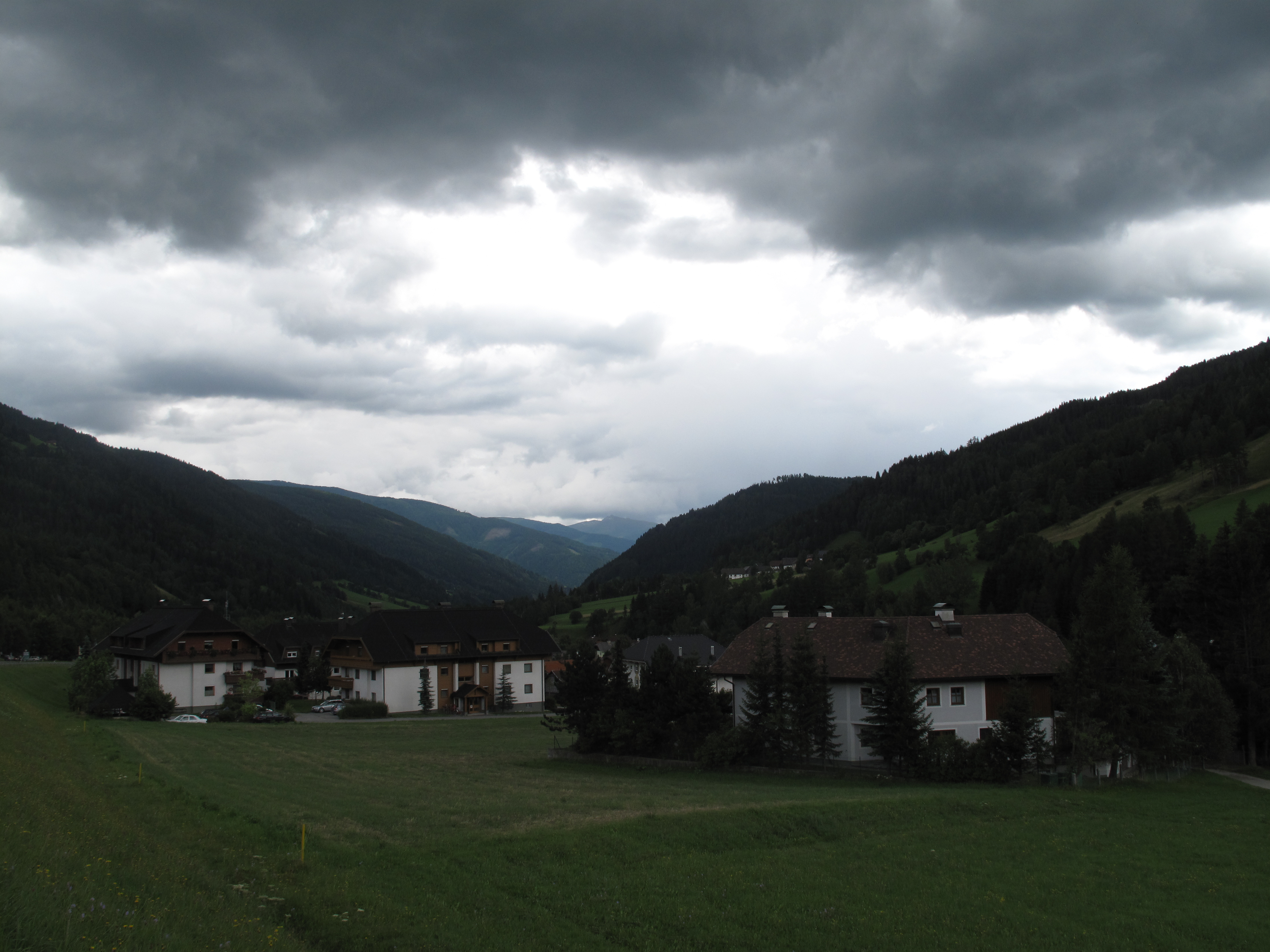

- Coat of arms

- Location within Austria
- Coordinates: 47°1′N 13°37′E
- Country: Austria
- State: Carinthia
- District: Spittal an der Drau

Government
  - Mayor: Franz Aschbacher (ÖVP)

Area
  - Total: 120.82 km^{2} (46.65 sq mi)
- Elevation: 1,143 m (3,750 ft)

Population (2018-01-01)
  - Total: 1,754
  - Density: 14.52/km^{2} (37.60/sq mi)
- Time zone: UTC+1 (CET)
  - Summer (DST): UTC+2 (CEST)
- Postal code: 9863
- Area code: 04734
- Website: www.rennweg-katschberg.at

Rennweg am Katschberg is a market town in the district of Spittal an der Drau in Carinthia, Austria.

== Geography ==
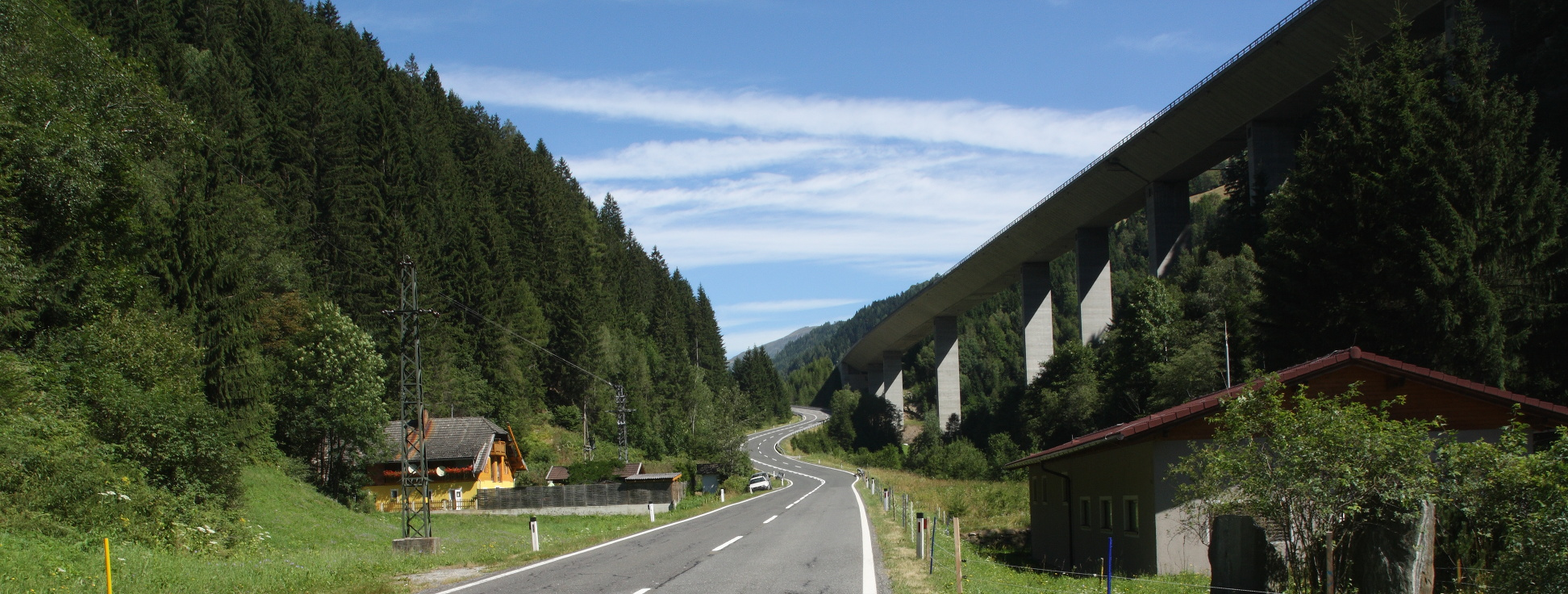
Katschberg pass road and Tauern Autobahn viaduct

Rennweg is located in the Katsch Valley (Katschtal) between the Hohe Tauern range in the west and the Gurktal Alps (Nock Mountains) in the east, along the upper part of the Lieser River, a left tributary of the Drava. In the north runs the main chain of the Alps, with the Katschberg Pass mountain area considered one of the largest skiing resorts in Carinthia, bringing much of Rennweg's reputation. It is located on the Katschberg Straße (B99) highway connecting Carinthia with the state of Salzburg, with access to the parallel Tauern Autobahn (A 10) and the Katschberg Tunnel.

The municipal area consists of the cadastral communities Rennweg, St. Peter and Oberdorf.

=== Nearby establishments ===
Gmünd, a town in the south of Rennweg, acts as a connecting point between the Lieser and Malta valleys. Spittal an der Drau, the district's centre, is located in the southeast of Gmünd.

The Millstätter See, a nearby lake acts as an attraction for tourists.

By traveling further south on the Autobahn the city of Villach can be reached.

== History ==
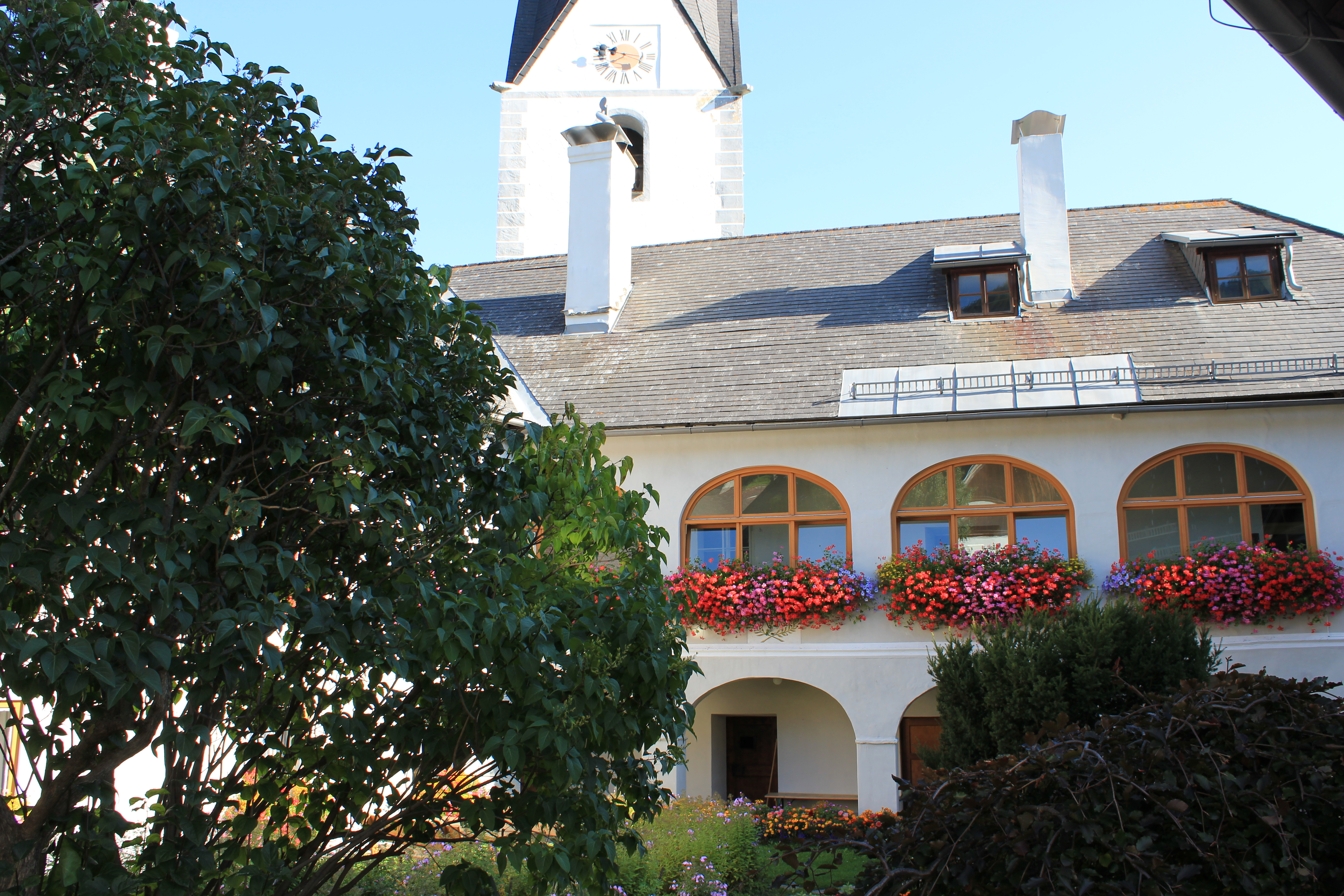
St. Peter, vicarage

The settlement arose in the valley north of Rauchenkatsch Castle in the Duchy of Carinthia, first mentioned as castrum chaetze in an 1197 deed. The area, which initially was ceded to the Bishops of Freising by King Henry II of Germany in 1007, was then held by the Archbishops of Salzburg. Like the castle, the Katsch Valley is probably named after the Lords of Katsch in nearby Styria. It was administrated by Salzburg ministeriales in order to exercise control over the important trade route across Katschberg Pass.

The present-day municipality was established in 1850 following the 1848 revolutions in the Austrian Empire. It was elevated to the status of market town in 2007.

== Culture ==
=== Music ===
The Katschtaler Trachtenkapelle, a group of Volksmusik instrumentalists, has played its share in the local concerts of the area. The music heard here is often found only in places like Rennweg, small villages that have not left behind the cultural music that has for centuries been a part of the Austrian culture.

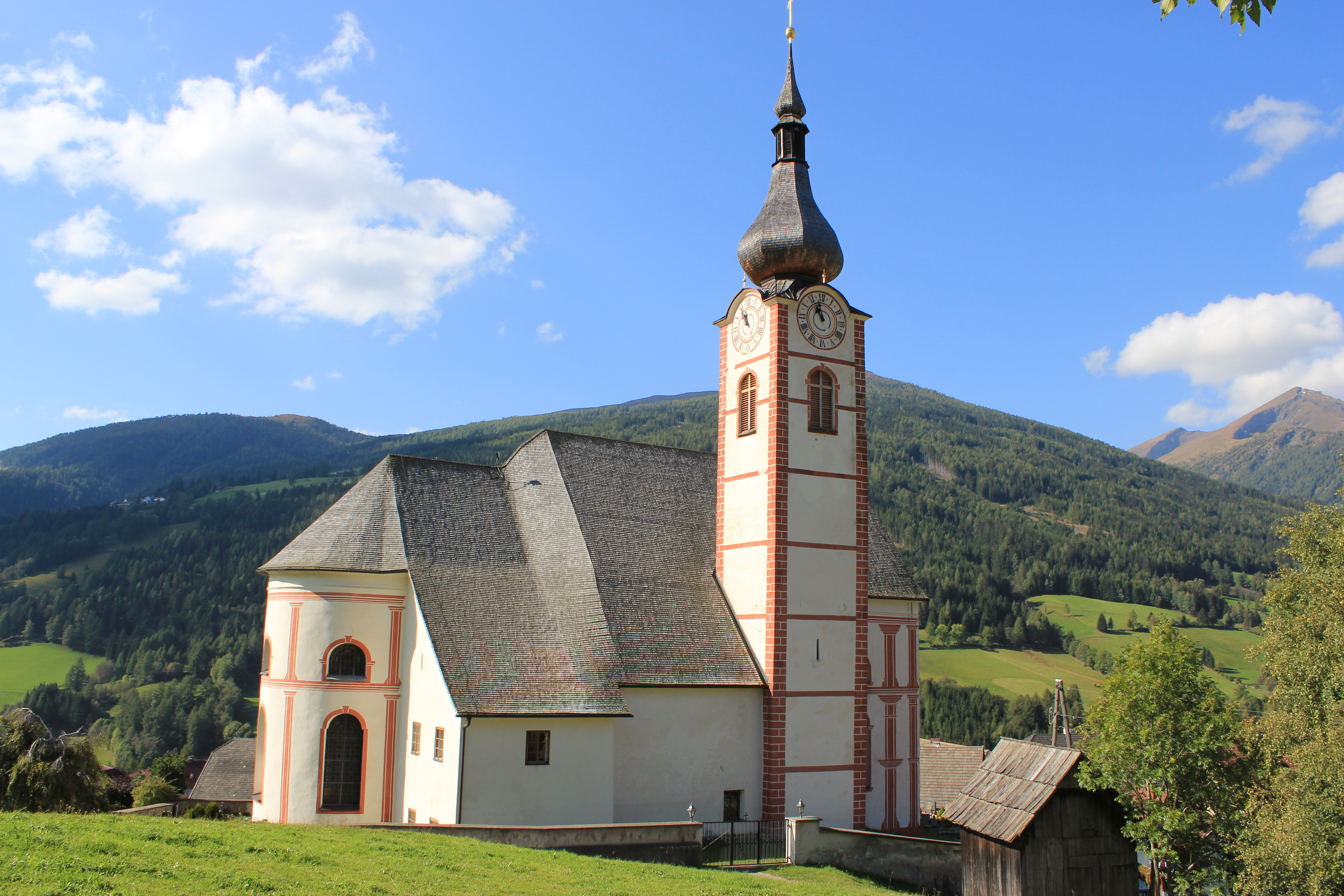
St George Church

=== Religion ===
The Saint George parish church can be found on the western side of the Katsch Valley. Saint Peter, another church on the eastern side of the valley has recently been renovated. It is located at the small village of St. Peter.

== Katschberg ==
The Katschberg area is a popular ski resort at the border of Salzburg and Carinthia. It lies on a plateau directly above the Katschberg Tunnel, at an altitude of 1,641m. The upmarket ski resort consists mainly of four-star hotels and vacation apartments, most of which have access to the ski lifts. It retains a strong traditional atmosphere, as the local culture is regularly celebrated in folkloric evenings.

Katschberg's 60 km of ski slopes span across two mountain tops. The resort's longest run is six kilometres, leading from the top of Aineck mountain to the village of Sankt Margarethen. The ski slopes are served by a system of 16 lifts with a capacity of 24,000 people per hour.

== Politics ==
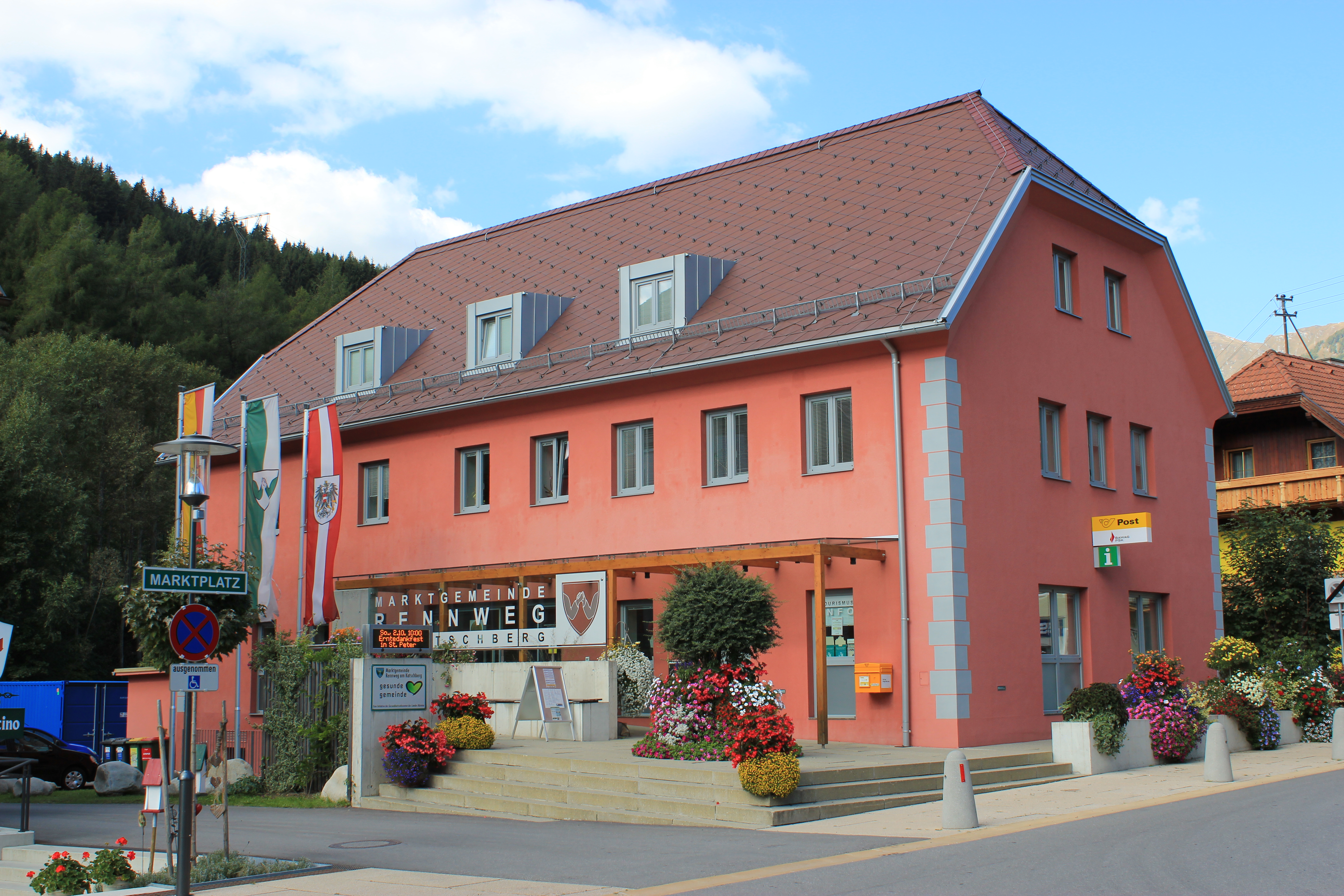
Town hall

Seats in the municipal assembly (Gemeinderat) as of 2009 local elections:

- Social Democratic Party of Austria (SPÖ): 7
- Austrian People's Party (ÖVP): 7
- Freedom Party of Austria (FPK): 5
