= Krems, Carinthia =

Krems in Kärnten
- Municipality
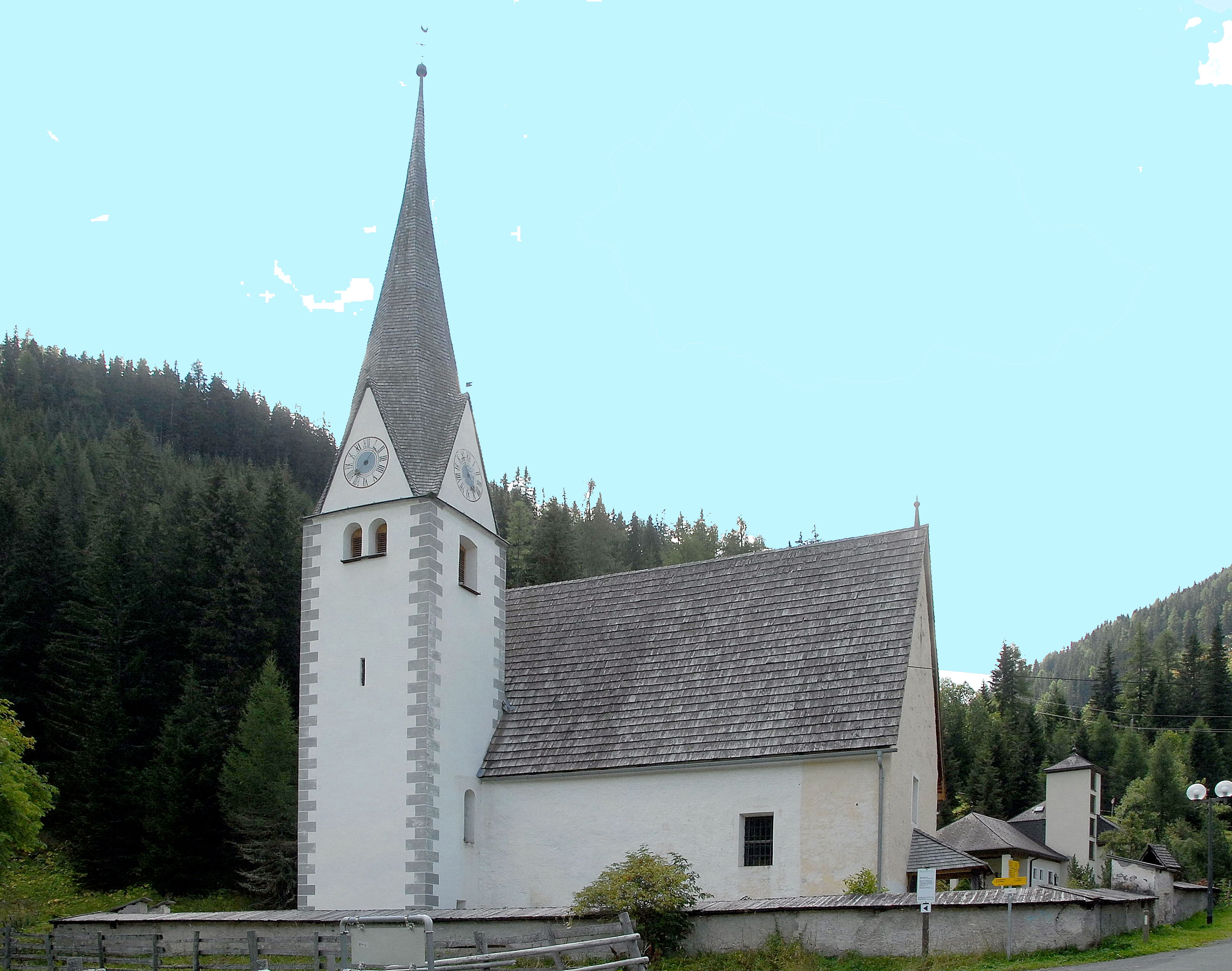
- Innerkrems parish church

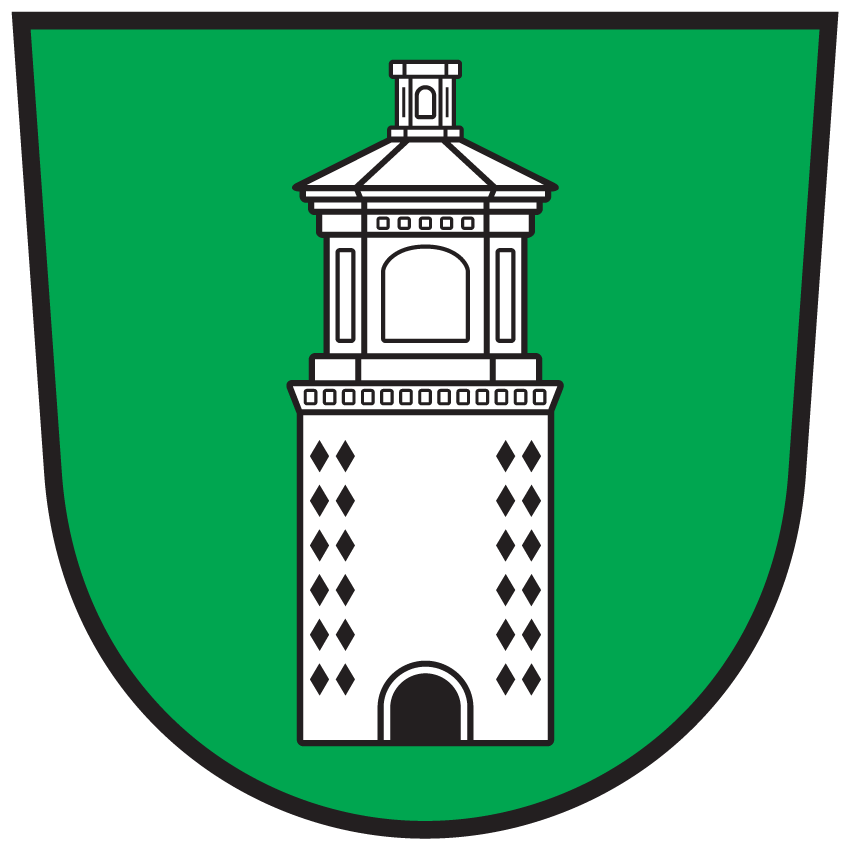
- Coat of arms

- Location within Austria
- Coordinates: 46°55′N 13°34′E
- Country: Austria
- State: Carinthia
- District: Spittal an der Drau

Government
  - Mayor: Johann Winkler (SPÖ)

Area
  - Total: 207.14 km^{2} (79.98 sq mi)
- Elevation: 807 m (2,648 ft)

Population (2018-01-01)
  - Total: 1,679
  - Density: 8.106/km^{2} (20.99/sq mi)
- Time zone: UTC+1 (CET)
  - Summer (DST): UTC+2 (CEST)
- Postal code: 9861, 9862
- Area code: 04732
- Website: www.krems-in-kaernten.at

Krems in Kärnten is a municipality in the district of Spittal an der Drau in Carinthia in Austria.

== Geography ==
The municipal area is located in the Krems Valley of northern Carinthia, at the border with the Austrian states of Salzburg (Lungau) and Styria (Upper Styria). It stretches down from the Lieser River, a tributary of the Drava, up to the Nock Mountains, part of the Gurktal Alps range.

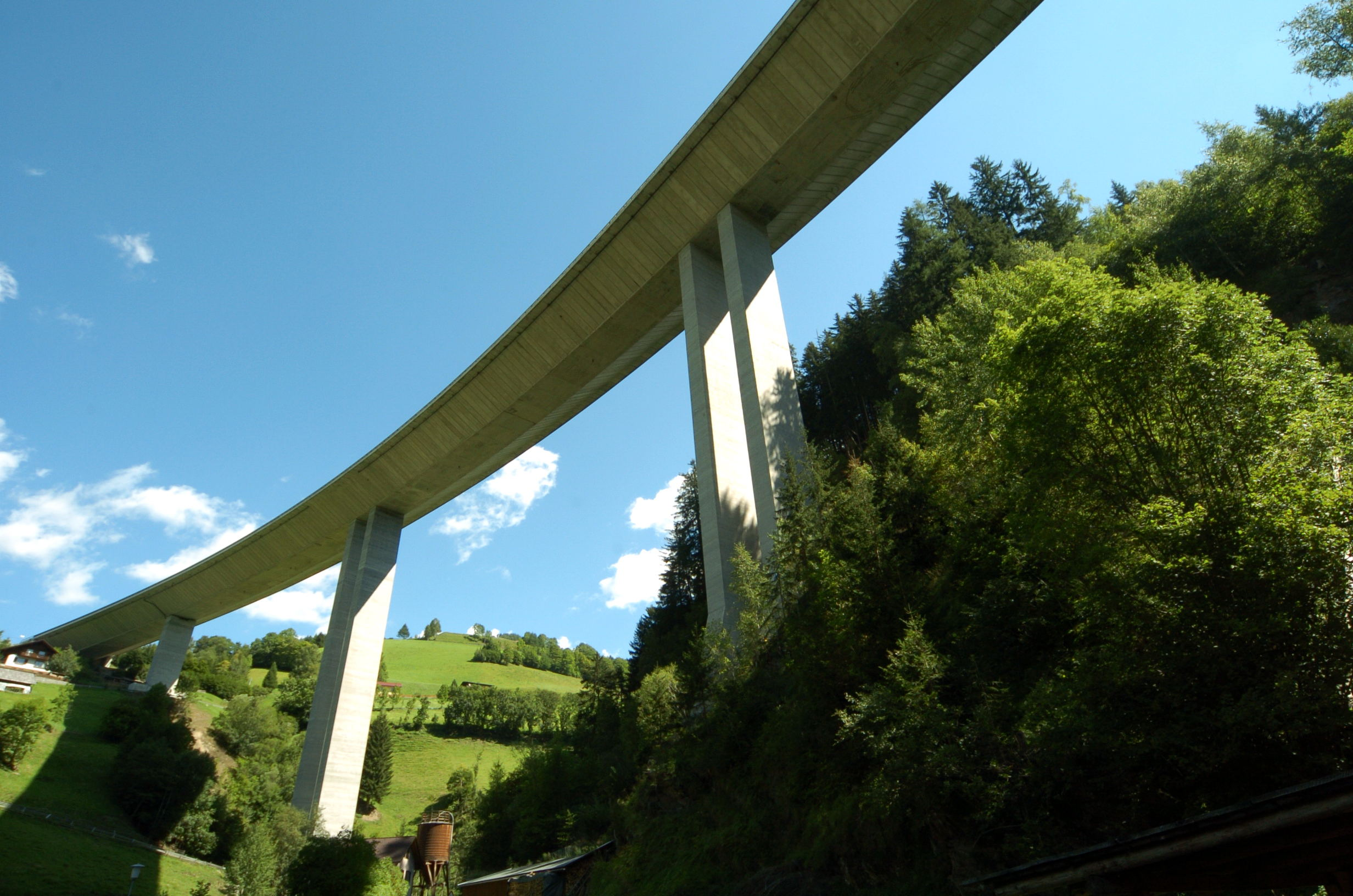
Autobahn bridge

The village of Innerkrems is the starting point of the scenic Nockalm Road to Reichenau, in the north the Schönfeldsattel Pass leads to Thomatal (Bundschuh) in Salzburg. To the west, the Katschberg Pass road and the parallel Tauern Autobahn are significant transport routes. The mountainous region is a popular winter sport destination, including several ski slopes and platter lifts.

The Krems municipality is subdivided into seven cadastral communities: Eisentratten, Kremsbrücke, Leoben, Nöring, Puchreit, Reitern, and Sankt Nikolai.

== History ==
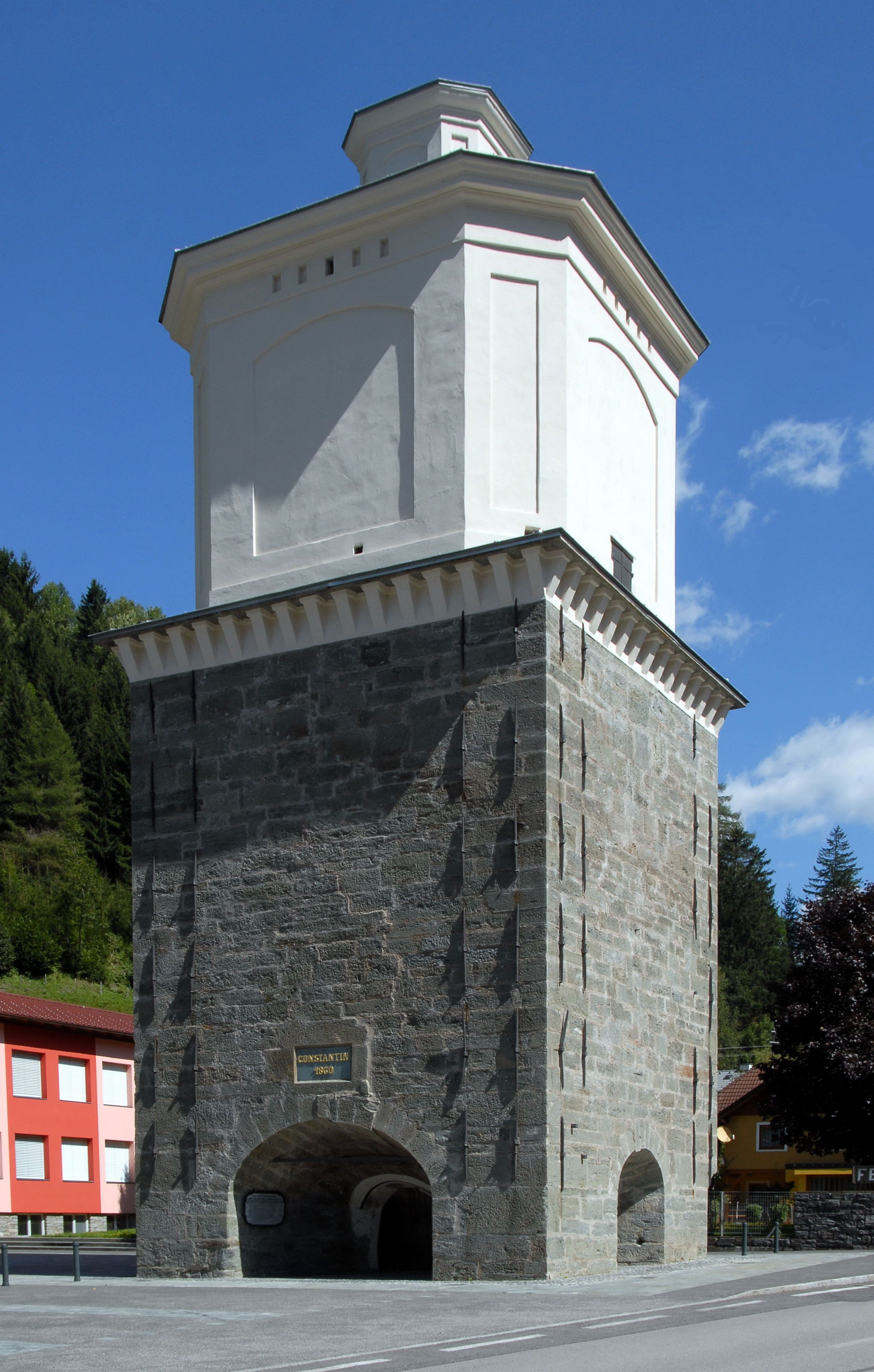
Eisentratten blast furnace

In 1197, Rauchenkatsch Castle was first documented, a fortification high above the Katschberg road. The surrounding estates then were held by the Archbishops of Salzburg, who had acquired it from the Bishopric of Freising. The castle was staffed with Salzburg ministeriales and the episcopal lands were administrated from nearby Gmünd.

From the 14th century onwards, Krems was an iron ore (Eisenerz) mining area, with a medieval hammer mill at Eisentratten. A blast furnace was built in 1541, rebuilt in 1861 it is a preserved landmark up to today.

== Politics ==
Seats in the municipal assembly as of 2009 elections:

- Social Democratic Party of Austria (SPÖ): 8
- Austrian People's Party (ÖVP): 6
- Freedom Party in Carinthia (FPK): 5

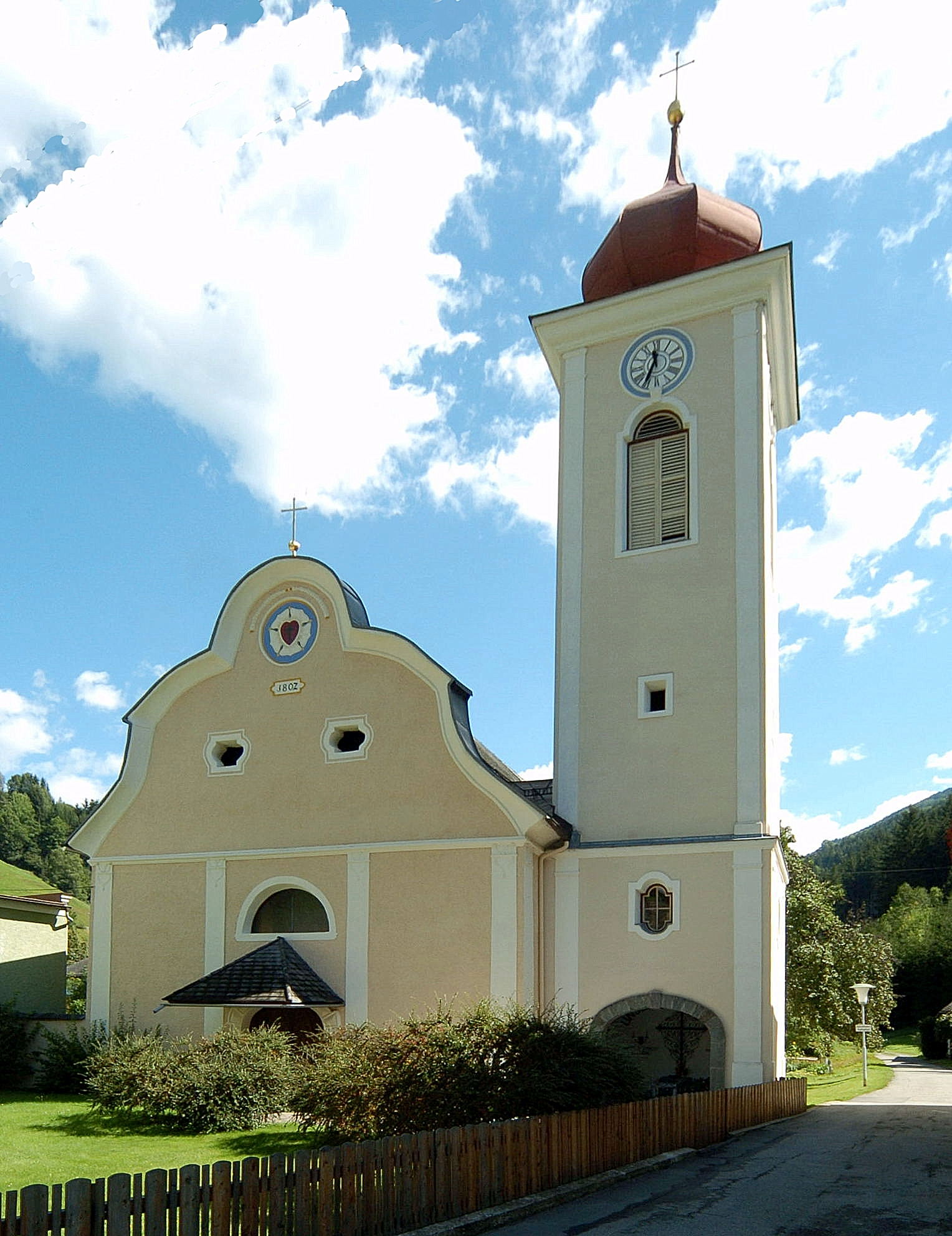
Eisentratten Protestant church

== Twin town ==
Krems is twinned with:

- Poppenricht, Germany
