= João Santos =

João Santos may refer to:

- João Santos (basketball) (born 1979), Portuguese basketball player
- João Fernando Santos (born 1964), Portuguese Olympic rower
- João Santos (swimmer) (born 1964), Portuguese swimmer
- João Santos (chairman) (born 1914), Portuguese businessman
- João Santos (footballer) (born 1909), Portuguese football forward
- João dos Santos (died 1622), Portuguese Dominican missionary in India and Africa
- João Santos (politician) (born 1997), Brazilian politician
