= Per Andersson =

Per Andersson may refer to:

- Per Andersson (biathlete) (born 1954), Swedish Olympic biathlete
- Per Andersson (rower) (born 1971), Swedish Olympic rower
- Per Andersson (actor) (born 1976), Swedish actor and comedian

== See also ==
- Per Andersson i Koldemo (1876–1944), Swedish politician
