= Gonin (disambiguation) =

Gonin is a Japanese word meaning "five people". It may also refer to:

- Gonin, 1995 film directed by Takashi Ishii
- Gonin (surname), list of people with the surname
- Gonin Saga, 2015 Japanese drama film
- Gonin Gumi, groups of five households during the Tokugawa period of Japanese history
- Aurora Gonin Musume, short-lived Japanese J-Pop group
  - Gonin Medal, international award in ophthalmology

== See also ==
- Goninan
