= Alexander Koch =

Alexander Koch may refer to:

- Alexander Koch (actor) (born 1988), American actor
- Alexander Koch (fencer) (born 1969), German fencer
- Alexander Koch (rower) (born 1967), Swiss Olympic rower
