= Priit Tasane =

Estonian rower

Personal information
- Nationality: Estonian
- Born: 16 November 1964 (age 60); Pärnu, Estonia

Sport
- Sport: Rowing

Priit Tasane (born 16 November 1964) is an Estonian rower. He competed in the men's double sculls event at the 1992 Summer Olympics.
