= Esko Hillebrandt =

Finnish rower

Personal information
- Nationality: Finnish
- Born: 20 April 1962 (age 62); Imatra, Finland

Sport
- Sport: Rowing

Esko Hillebrandt (born 20 April 1962) is a Finnish rower. He competed in the men's double sculls event at the 1992 Summer Olympics.
