= Miguel Álvarez (rower) =

Spanish rower

Personal information
- Nationality: Spanish
- Born: 10 February 1971 (age 54); Vigo, Spain

Sport
- Sport: Rowing

Miguel Álvarez (born 10 February 1971) is a Spanish rower. He competed in the men's double sculls event at the 1992 Summer Olympics.
