= Chiang Wing Hung =

Hong Kong rower (born 1962)

Personal information
- Nationality: Hong Konger
- Born: 11 January 1962 (age 63)

Sport
- Sport: Rowing

Chiang Wing Hung (born 11 January 1962) is a Hong Kong rower. He competed in the men's double sculls event at the 1992 Summer Olympics.
