= José Antonio Merín =

Spanish rower

Personal information
- Nationality: Spanish
- Born: 11 July 1970 (age 54); Amposta, Spain

Sport
- Sport: Rowing

José Antonio Merín (born 11 July 1970) is a Spanish former competitive rower, specializing in double sculls. He competed in that event at the 1992 Summer Olympics and the 1996 Summer Olympics.
