= Arnold Jonke =

Austrian rower (born 1962)

Medal record

Men's rowing

Representing Austria

Olympic Games
Silver medal – second place	1992 Barcelona	Double sculls

World Rowing Championships
Gold medal – first place	1990 Tasmania	M2x
Bronze medal – third place	1989 Bled	M2x

Arnold Jonke (born 25 December 1962 in Gmünd) is an Austrian rower.
