= Michael Holman (linguist) =

British linguist (born 1940)

Michael John De Koby Holman (born 15 May 1940) is a British linguist and Slavicist, fluent in Russian, Bulgarian, German and French. He studied at Lincoln College, Oxford and University of Leipzig, and worked as a senior lecturer for the University of Leeds Department of Russian Studies from 1966–1999.

Together with the Bulgarian linguists A. Danchev, E. Dimova and M. Savova, Holman developed a system for the English-oriented Romanization of Bulgarian known as Danchev System. He translated Nikolai Haitov's Wild Tales from Bulgarian (published by Owen in 1979) and authored the best-selling Teach Yourself Bulgarian Series (with M. Kovatcheva).

== Honours ==
DLitt honoris causa from Sofia University in 2005.

== Publications ==
- A. Danchev, M. Holman, E. Dimova, M. Savova, An English Dictionary of Bulgarian Names: Spelling and Pronunciation, Nauka i Izkustvo Publishers, 1989, 288 pp.
- M. Holman, M. Kovatcheva. Teach Yourself Bulgarian: Complete Course Package, McGraw-Hill (2nd edition), 2004. ISBN 0-07-143023-7
- M. Holman, M. Kovatcheva Complete Bulgarian McGraw-Hill 2011. ISBN 978-1-444-10600-8
- M. Kovatcheva, M. Holman Speak Bulgarian with confidence. Audio-course. Hodder&Stoughton 2010. ISBN 978-1-444-10341-0
