= Oleksandr Slobodeniuk =

Soviet rower (1971–2018)

Personal information
- Nationality: Soviet
- Born: 30 March 1971
- Died: 29 December 2018 (aged 47)

Sport
- Sport: Rowing

Oleksandr Slobodeniuk (30 March 1971 – 29 December 2018) was a Soviet rower. He competed in the men's double sculls event at the 1992 Summer Olympics.
