= Daniel Alves (rower) =

Portuguese rower (born 1969)

Personal information
- Nationality: Portuguese
- Born: 15 March 1969 (age 56); Porto, Portugal

Sport
- Sport: Rowing

Daniel Alves (born 15 March 1969) is a Portuguese rower. He competed in the men's double sculls event at the 1992 Summer Olympics.
