= Gmünd, Carinthia =

Gmünd
- Municipality
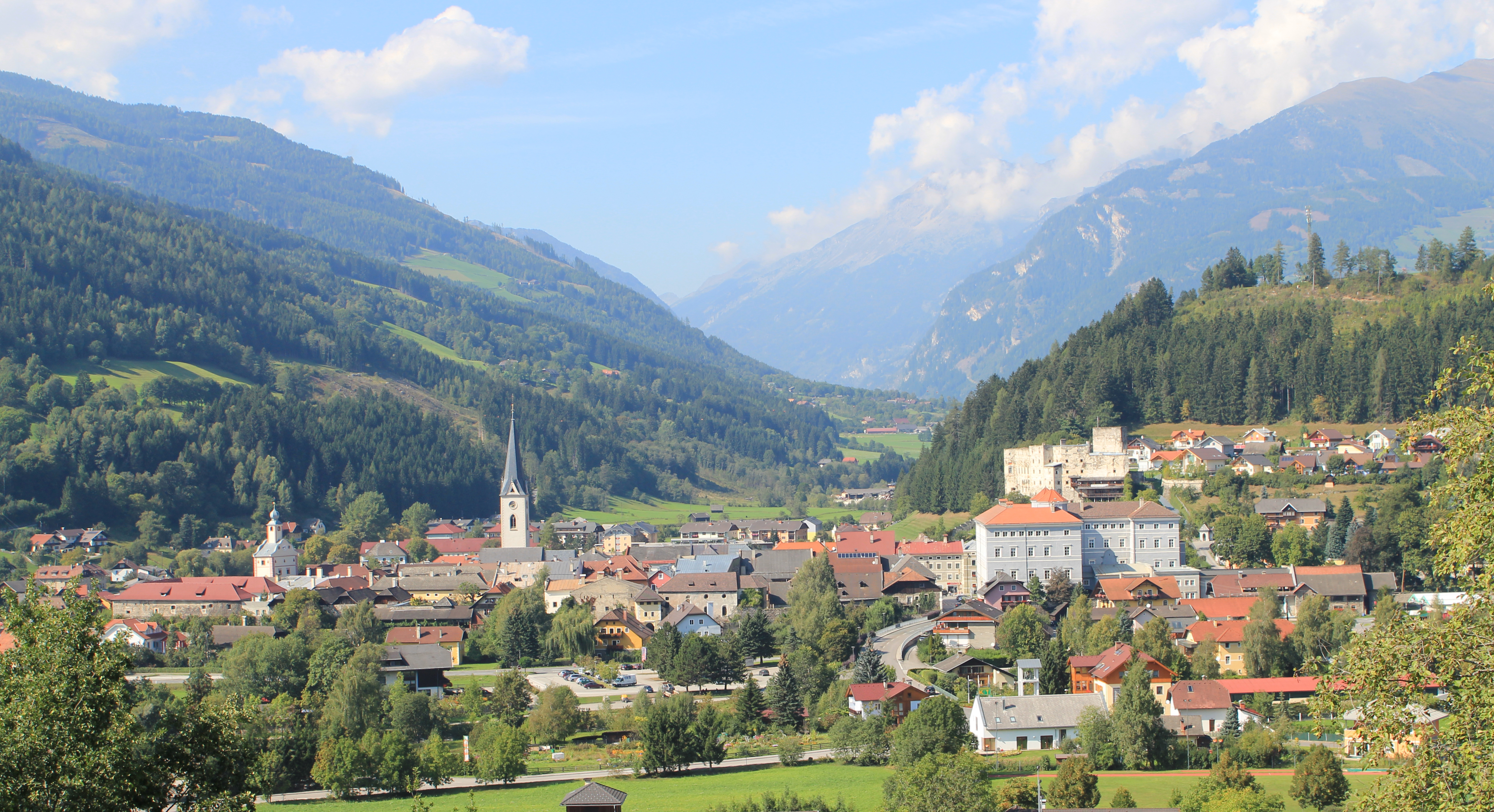

- Coat of arms

- Location within Austria
- Coordinates: 46°54′N 13°32′E
- Country: Austria
- State: Carinthia
- District: Spittal an der Drau

Government
  - Mayor: Josef Jury (LJJ)

Area
  - Total: 31.56 km^{2} (12.19 sq mi)
- Elevation: 741 m (2,431 ft)

Population (2018-01-01)
  - Total: 2,550
  - Density: 80.8/km^{2} (209/sq mi)
- Time zone: UTC+1 (CET)
  - Summer (DST): UTC+2 (CEST)
- Postal code: 9853
- Area code: 04732
- Website: www.stadt-gmuend.at

Gmünd in Kärnten is a municipality and historic town in the district of Spittal an der Drau, in the Austrian state of Carinthia.

== Geography ==
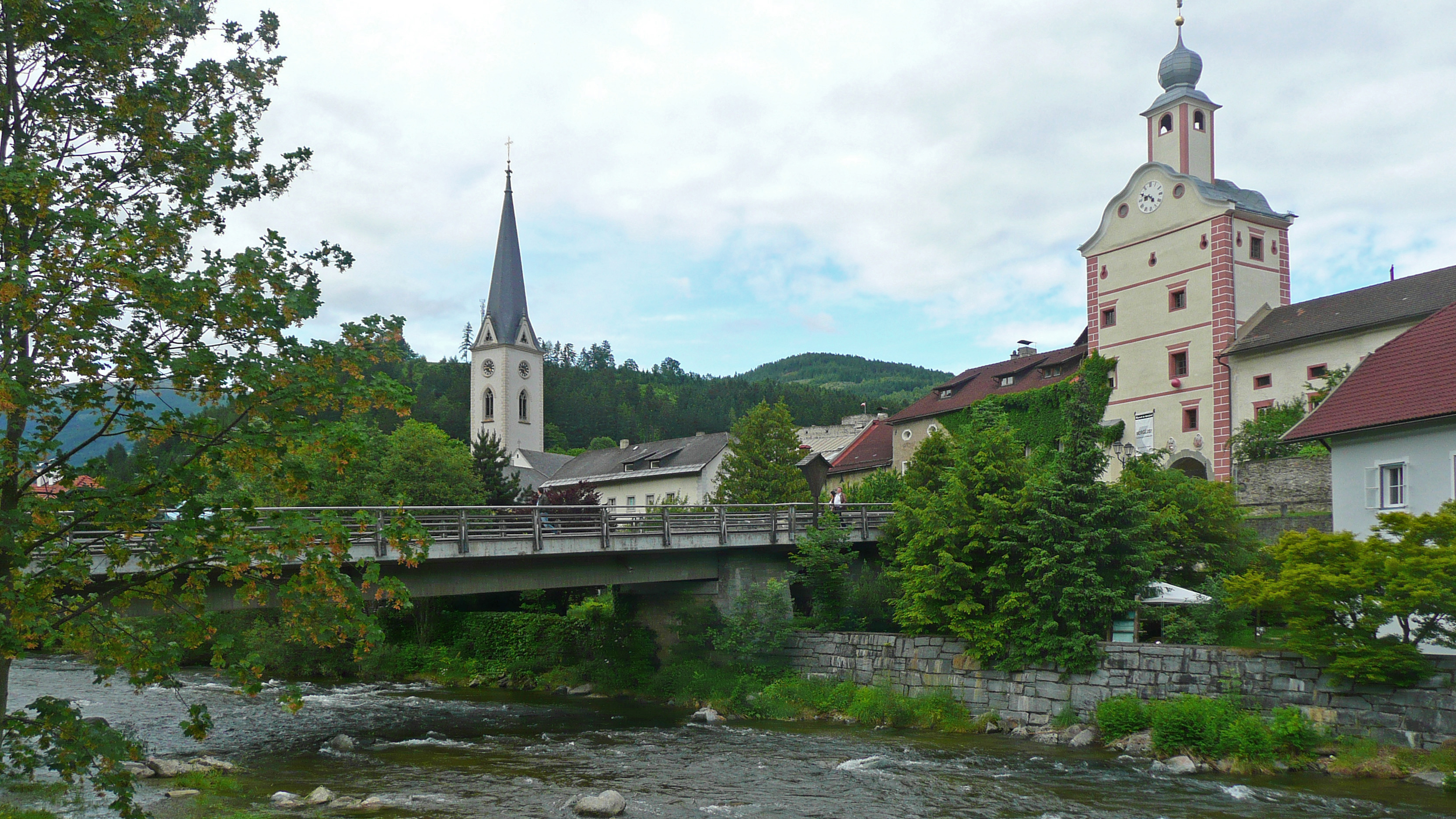
Malta bridge

The municipality is situated on the southeastern rim of the Ankogel Group of the Hohe Tauern range, part of the Central Eastern Alps. The old town lies within the valley of the Lieser river, a left tributary of the Drava. In the west the Malta Valley leads up to the Kölnbrein Dam. In the east, Gmünd borders on Krems within the Gurktal Alps.

The municipal area is subdivided into three cadastral communities: Gmünd, Kreuschlach and Landfrass. There are the following constituent villages (2001 pop. in parentheses):

- Burgwiese (16)
- Gmünd (1,547)
- Grünleiten (15)
- Karnerau (56)
- Landfrass (216)
- Moos (20)
- Moostratte (94)
- Oberbuch (27)
- Oberkreuschlach (65)
- Perau (98)
- Platz (37)
- Treffenboden (245)
- Unterbuch (108)
- Unterkreuschlach (61)

Gmünd has access to the Tauern Autobahn (A 10) from Salzburg to Villach and vice versa. The nearest train station is on the Tauern Railway line in Spittal an der Drau.

== History ==
At the site of a former a mansio on the Roman road leading from the Drava valley via Katschberg Pass to Iuvavum (Salzburg), the town of Gmünd was probably founded by Archbishop Eberhard II of Salzburg, as it was first documented in a 1252 deed. It was laid out as a southern outpost of the archbishopric within the Duchy of Carinthia, a market was mentioned in 1273 and Gmünd received town privileges in 1346.

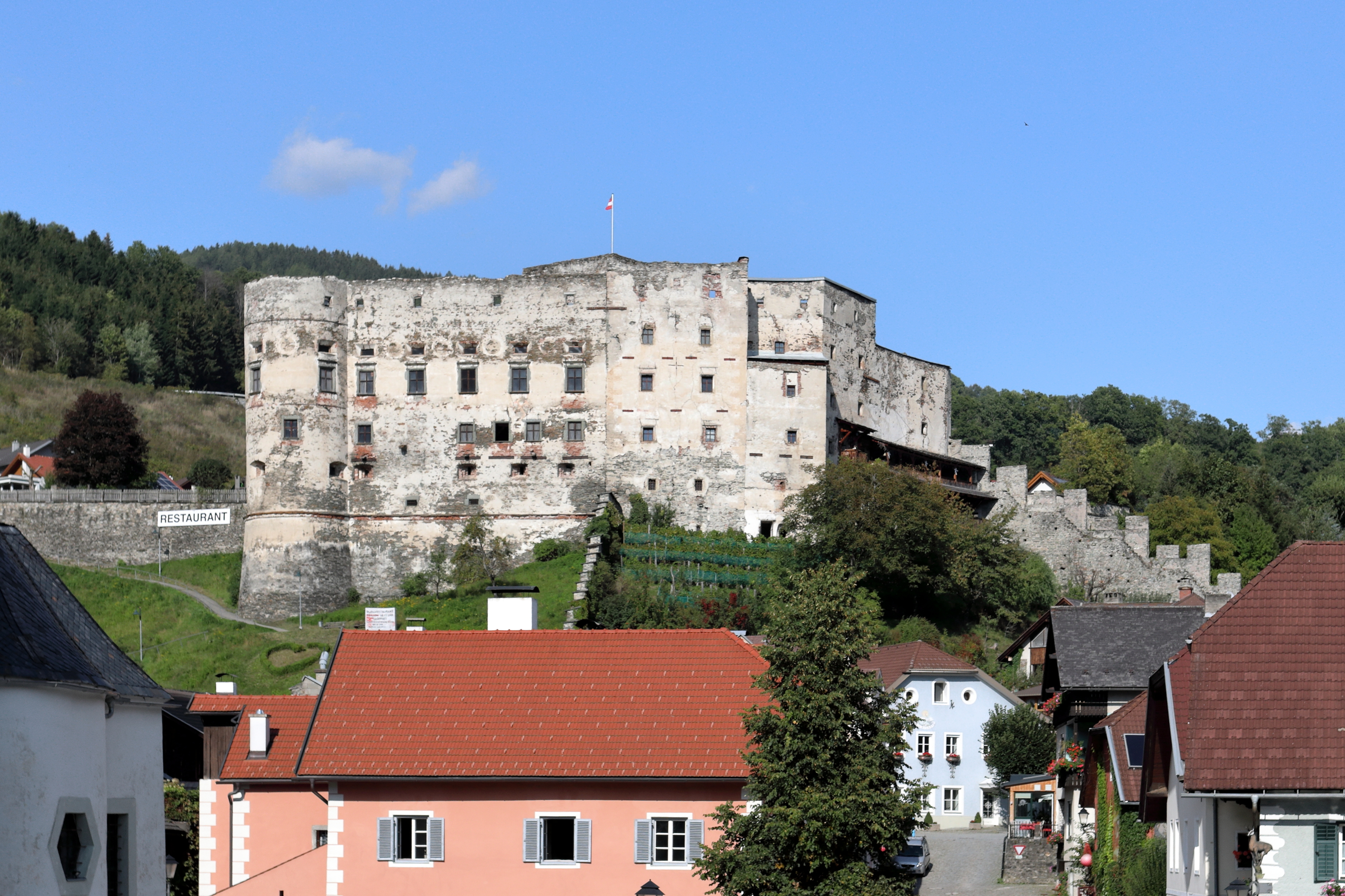
Gmünd castle

On a hill above the old town are the ruins of Gmünd Castle, likewise dating from the mid 13th century. During the Austrian-Hungarian War in 1487 it was occupied and destroyed by the troops of King Matthias Corvinus after a seven-years-long siege, and rebuilt from 1502 to 1506 under the Salzburg archbishop Leonhard von Keutschach. During the German Peasants' War of 1525, it was again besieged, though not captured. Archbishop Wolf Dietrich Raitenau had the building enlarged in 1607. Devastated by a fire in 1886, it was restored from 1950 and is today used for theatrical performances, concerts and lectures, including a viewing tower and a restaurant.

The Gothic Assumption of Mary parish church was consecrated in 1399. North of the town is the Kreuzbichl divided chapel from 1588; the historic Roman road runs right between the altar and the nave, which was added in 1784. Inside the city walls with its four gates the Baroque palace of the Italian Lodron noble family, relatives and officials of the Salzburg archbishops, was erected from 1651 to 1654.

From 1944 on, the engineering office of Ferdinand Porsche was headquartered in Gmünd. Reich Minister Albert Speer had persuaded the Wehrwirtschaftsführer to avoid the Allied bomb raids in the Zuffenhausen district of Stuttgart, and Porsche chose the estates of a former sawmill in the village of Karnerau, near his manor in Zell am See. After the end of World War II he was arrested, while his son Ferry Porsche together with Erwin Komenda designed and built the first Porsche 356 sports cars at Gmünd, including the prototype "No.1" from 1948. In 1982 a private Porsche museum near the former factory opened with a collection of Porsche 356.

== Politics ==
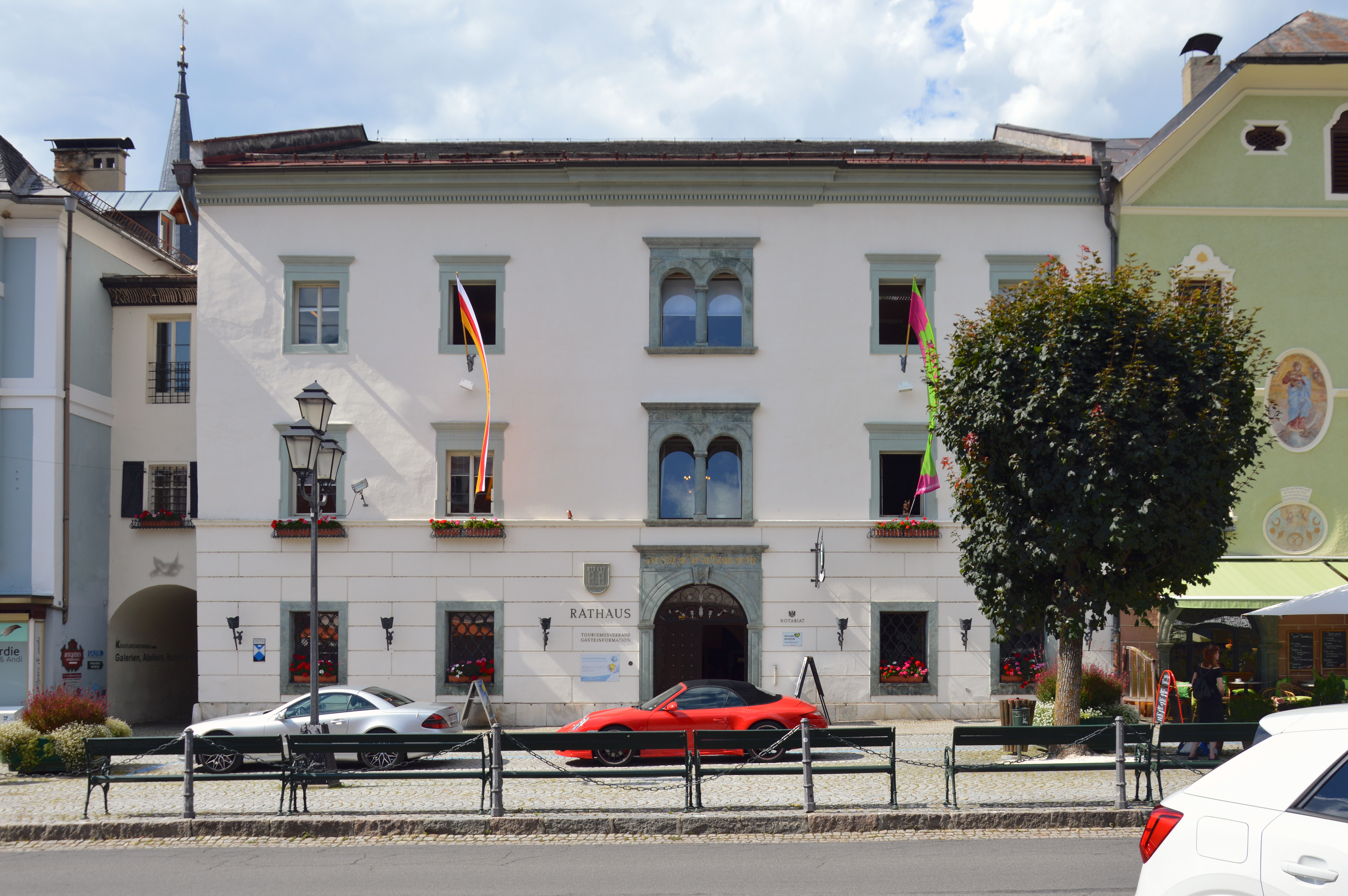
Town hall

The municipal council (Gemeinderat) is composed of 19 members and, following the 2021 Carinthian local elections, represents the following parties:

- List Josef Jury (LJJ): 8 seats
- Social Democratic Party of Austria (SPÖ): 7 seats
- Austrian People's Party (ÖVP): 4 seats

The mayor of Gmünd, Josef Jury, was re-elected in 2021.

=== Twin towns — Sister cities ===
Gmünd is twinned with:

- Osnabrück, Germany, since 1971

== Notable people ==
- Arnold Jonke (born 1962), rower
