= St. Michael im Lungau =

- Municipality
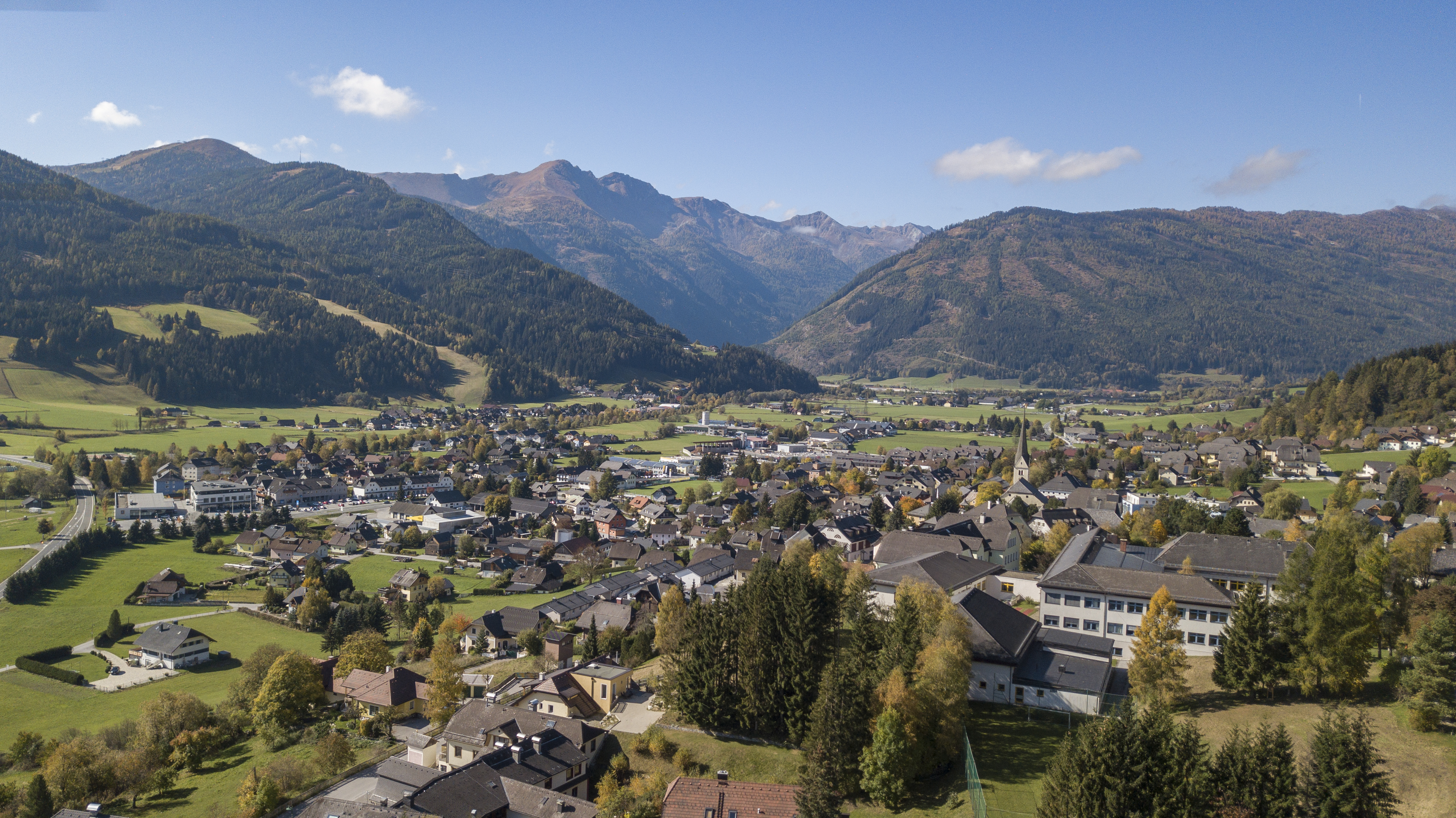

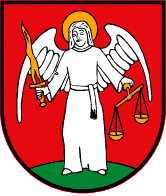
- Coat of arms

- Location within Austria
- Coordinates: 47°06′00″N 13°38′00″E
- Country: Austria
- State: Salzburg
- District: Tamsweg

Government
  - Mayor: Manfred Sampl (ÖVP)

Area
  - Total: 68.8 km^{2} (26.6 sq mi)
- Elevation: 1,075 m (3,527 ft)

Population (2018-01-01)
  - Total: 3,520
  - Density: 51.2/km^{2} (133/sq mi)
- Time zone: UTC+1 (CET)
  - Summer (DST): UTC+2 (CEST)
- Postal code: 5582
- Area code: +43 6477
- Vehicle registration: TA
- Website: www.sankt-michael.at

St. Michael im Lungau is a market town in the district of Tamsweg in the Austrian state of Salzburg.

== Geography ==
It is located in the historic Lungau region, in the valley of the upper Mur river, north of Katschberg Pass on the border with the state of Carinthia. With a population of about 3,500, St. Michael is the second largest municipality in Tamsweg District. The municipal area comprises the cadastral communities of Höf, Oberweissburg, St. Martin im Lungau, St. Michael im Lungau, and Unterweissburg.

St. Michael has access to the Tauern Autobahn (A10) running from Salzburg to Villach and is the site of a large toll booth. The parallel Katschberg Straße (B99) highway leads from Radstadt and Radstädter Tauern Pass in the north to Spittal an der Drau, Carinthia via Katschberg Pass in the south. The Murtal Straße (B96) branch-off leads eastwards down the Mur valley to the district capital Tamsweg and Murau in Styria.

== History ==
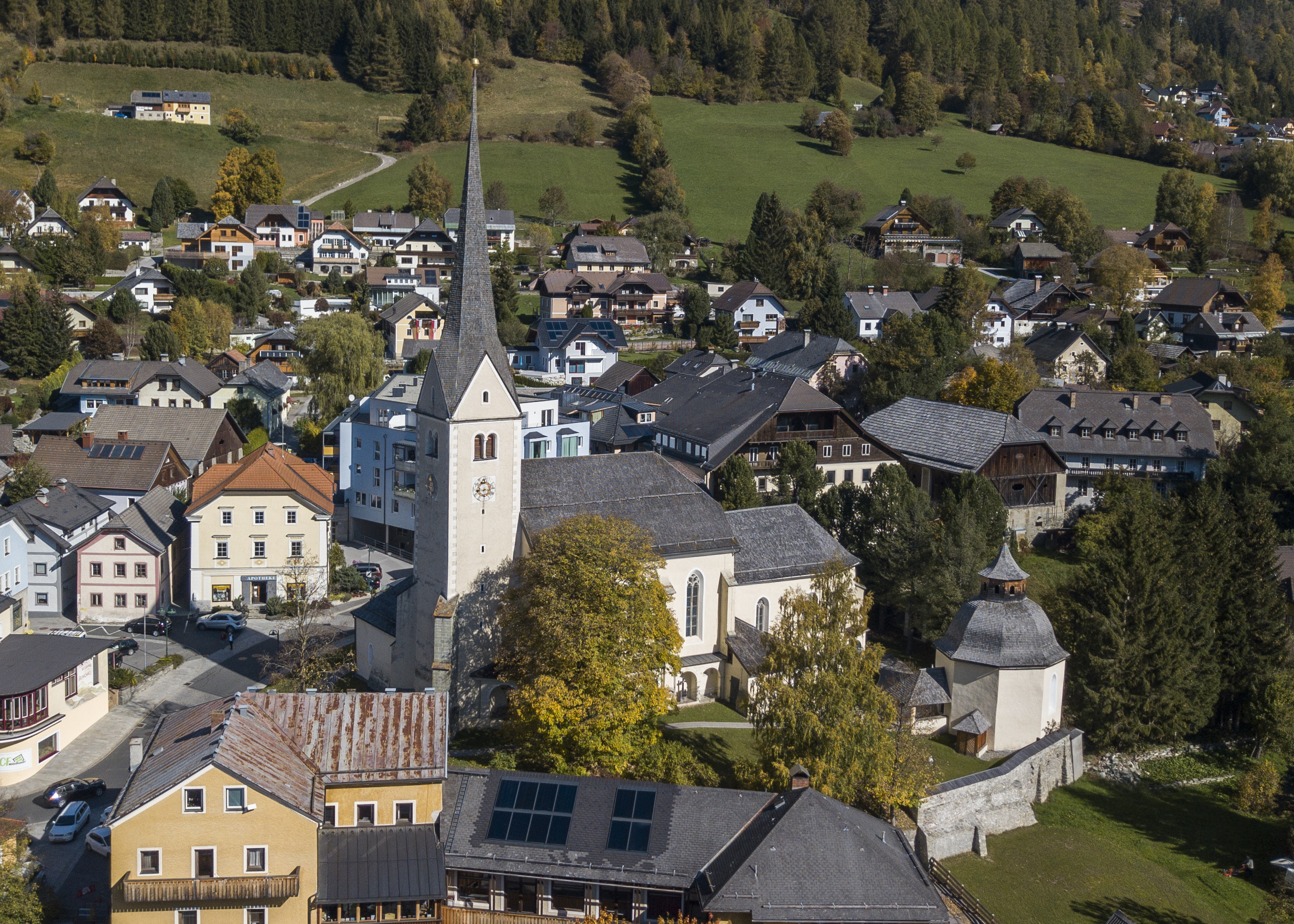
St Michael parish church

The Lungau region has been continuously settled at least since the Bronze Age; the local Hallstatt culture was gradually assimilated by Celtic immigrants about 450 BC. After the Celtic kingdom of Noricum became a Roman province in 15 BC, a road was laid out across Katschberg Pass, leading to the city of Teurnia in the south. In the 6th century AD, Slavic tribes moved into the area, succeeded by Bavarian settlers 200 years later.

The Gothic parish church dedicated to Saint Michael was first mentioned in an 1147 deed. Together with the Lungau region it became a part of the Prince-Archbishopric of Salzburg in the late 13th century, ruled from nearby Mauterndorf, later from Moosham Castle.

The Heihsgut manor house in the village of St. Martin, first documented in 1478, is one of the oldest preserved dwellings in the Salzburg Alps. Like several other Lungau municipalities, St. Michael is known for its annual Samson parades.

== Politics ==
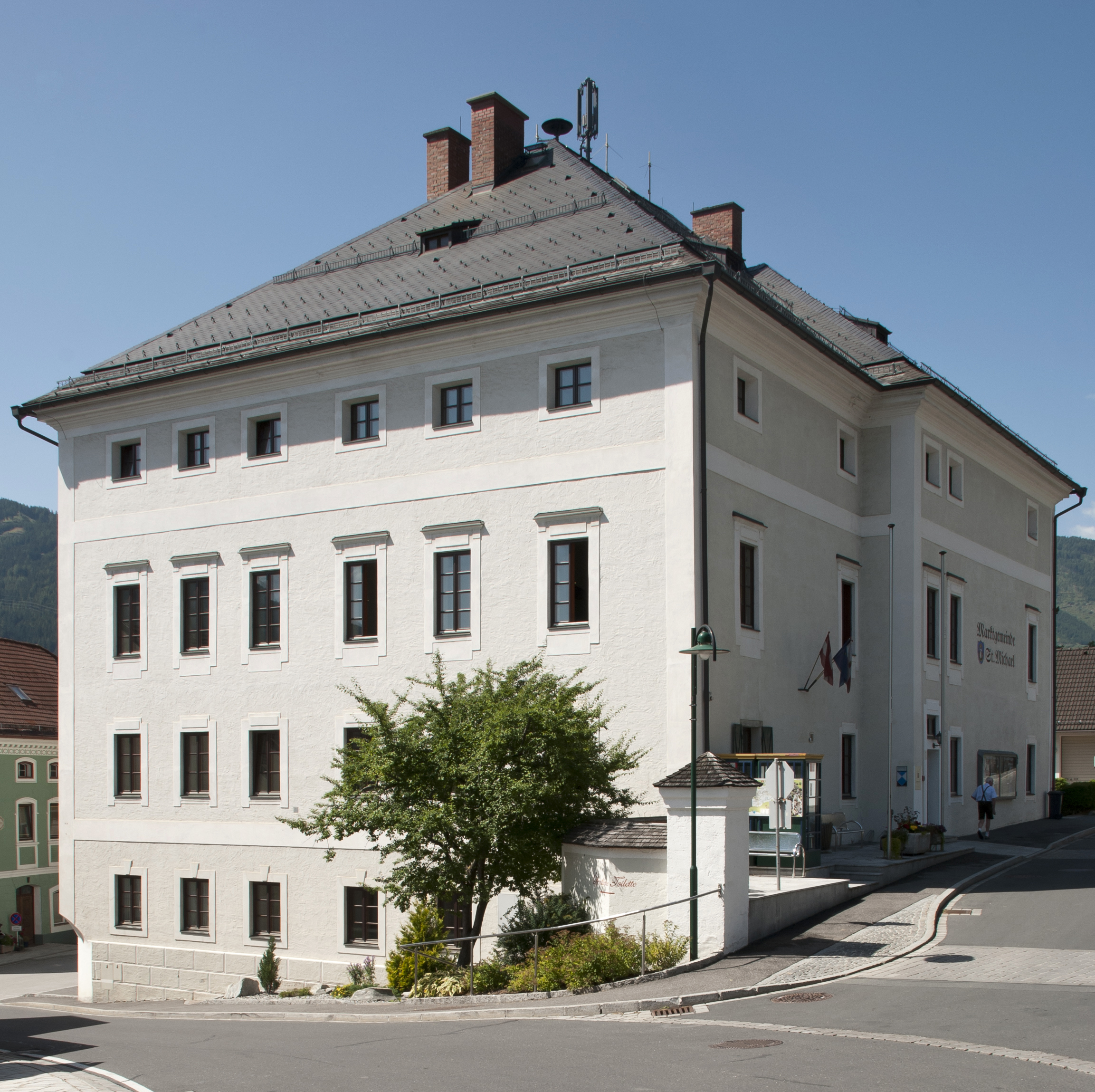
Town hall

Seats in the municipal assembly (Gemeinderat) as of 2014 elections:

- Austrian People's Party (ÖVP): 13
- Social Democratic Party of Austria (SPÖ): 6
- Freedom Party of Austria (FPÖ): 2

== Twin town ==
St. Michael is twinned with:

- Bad Leonfelden, Austria

== Notable people ==
- Dagobert Peche (1887–1923), artist and designer
- Rudi Wilfer (1936–2022), pianist and composer
