= Zsolt Lévai =

Hungarian rower

Personal information
- Nationality: Hungarian
- Born: 3 August 1965 (age 59); Budapest, Hungary

Sport
- Sport: Rowing

Zsolt Lévai (born 3 August 1965) is a Hungarian rower. He competed in the men's double sculls event at the 1992 Summer Olympics.
