= Mattias Lindgren =

Swedish rower

Personal information
- Nationality: Swedish
- Born: 30 March 1972 (age 53); Dalarna, Sweden

Sport
- Sport: Rowing

Mattias Lindgren (born 30 March 1972) is a Swedish rower. He competed in the men's double sculls event at the 1992 Summer Olympics.
