= European route E66 =

Road in trans-European E-road network

E66

Route information
- Length: 651 km (405 mi)

Major junctions
- West end: Franzensfeste, Italy
- East end: Székesfehérvár, Hungary

Location
- Countries: Italy; Austria; Hungary

Highway system
- International E-road network; A Class; B Class

European route E66 is a part of the International E-road network. This Class A intermediate west–east route runs 651 kilometres (405 mi) from Franzensfeste in Italy to Székesfehérvár in Hungary, connecting the Alps with the Pannonian Plain.

== Itinerary ==
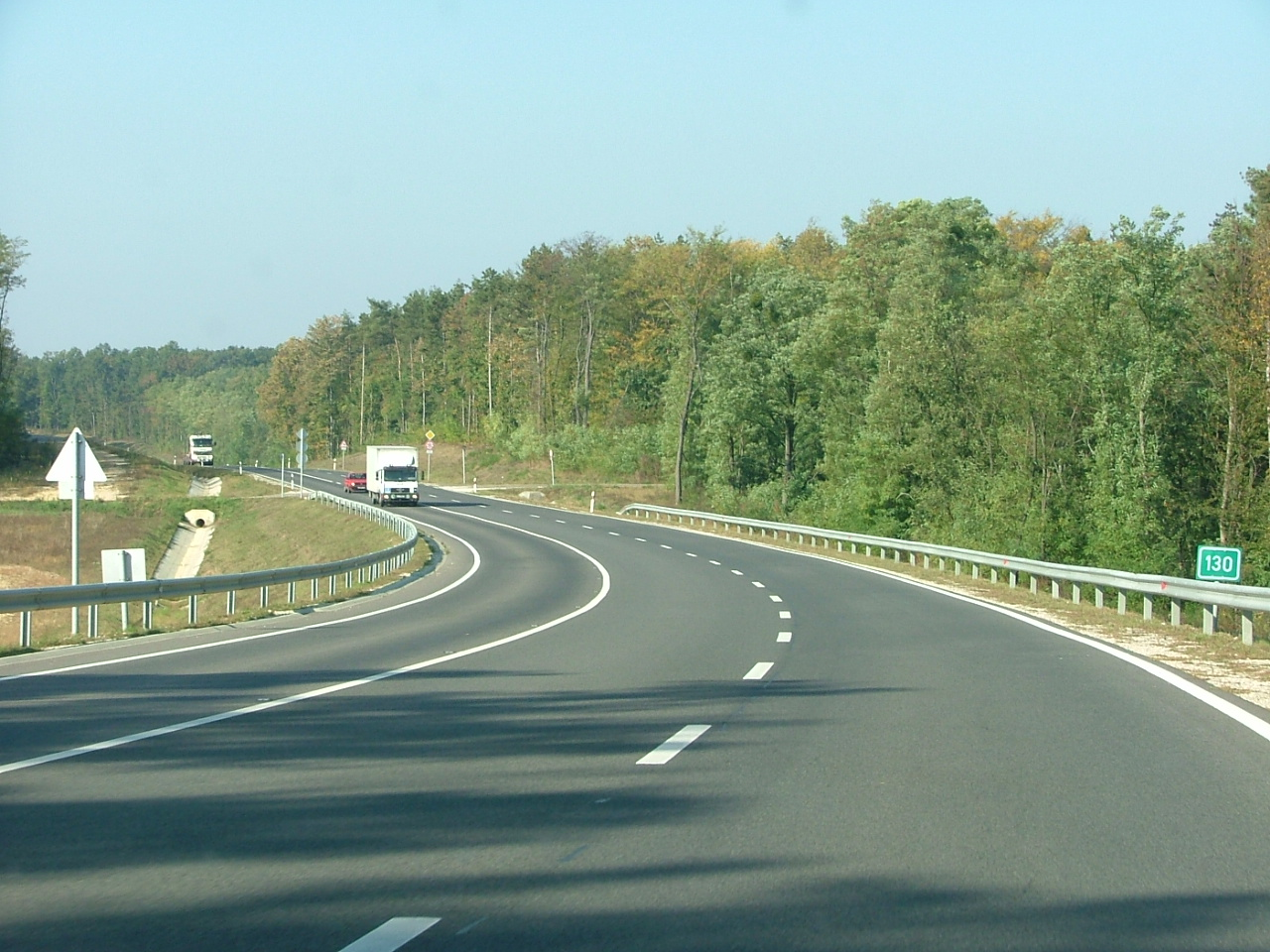
Hungarian Route 8 near Csehimindszent

The E 66 routes through three European countries:

- Italy
  - SS 49: Franzensfeste (with connection to European route E45) - Innichen - Winnebach
- Austria
  - B 100 (Drautal Straße): Arnbach - Silian - Lienz - Oberdrauburg - Spittal an der Drau
  - A 10 (Tauern Autobahn): Spittal an der Drau - Villach
  - A 2 (Süd Autobahn): Villach - Klagenfurt - Graz - Riegersdorf
  - S 7 (Fürstenfelder Schnellstraße): A2 (Riegersdorf) - Heiligenkreuz im Lafnitztal
- Hungary
  - M80: Rábafüzes/Szentgotthárd - Körmend
  - 8: Körmend - Veszprém - Székesfehérvár.

Hungary requested in October 2011 that E66 should be extended from Székesfehérvár via Dunaújváros - Kecskemét to Szolnok. This has not taken effect, so in 2019 Hungary requested the same extension Székesfehérvár – Szolnok again.
