= Max Holdo =

Argentine rower

Personal information
- Nationality: Argentine
- Born: 9 March 1971 (age 55)

Sport
- Sport: Rowing
Medal record
Representing Argentina
Pan American Games
Bronze medal – third place	1991 Havana	Double sculls

Max Alejandro Holdo Bagott (born 9 March 1971) is an Argentine former rower. He competed in the men's double sculls event at the 1992 Summer Olympics.
