= Gonin (surname) =

Gonin is a surname. Notable people with the surname include:

- Alessio Gonin, Italian curler
- Francesco Gonin (1808–1889), Italian painter, engraver and scenographer
- Jules Gonin (1870–1935), Swiss ophthalmologist
- Patrick Gonin (born 1957), French racing driver
- René Gonin (born 1969), Swiss rower
- Simone Gonin (born 1989), Italian curler
