= Poppenricht =

- Municipality
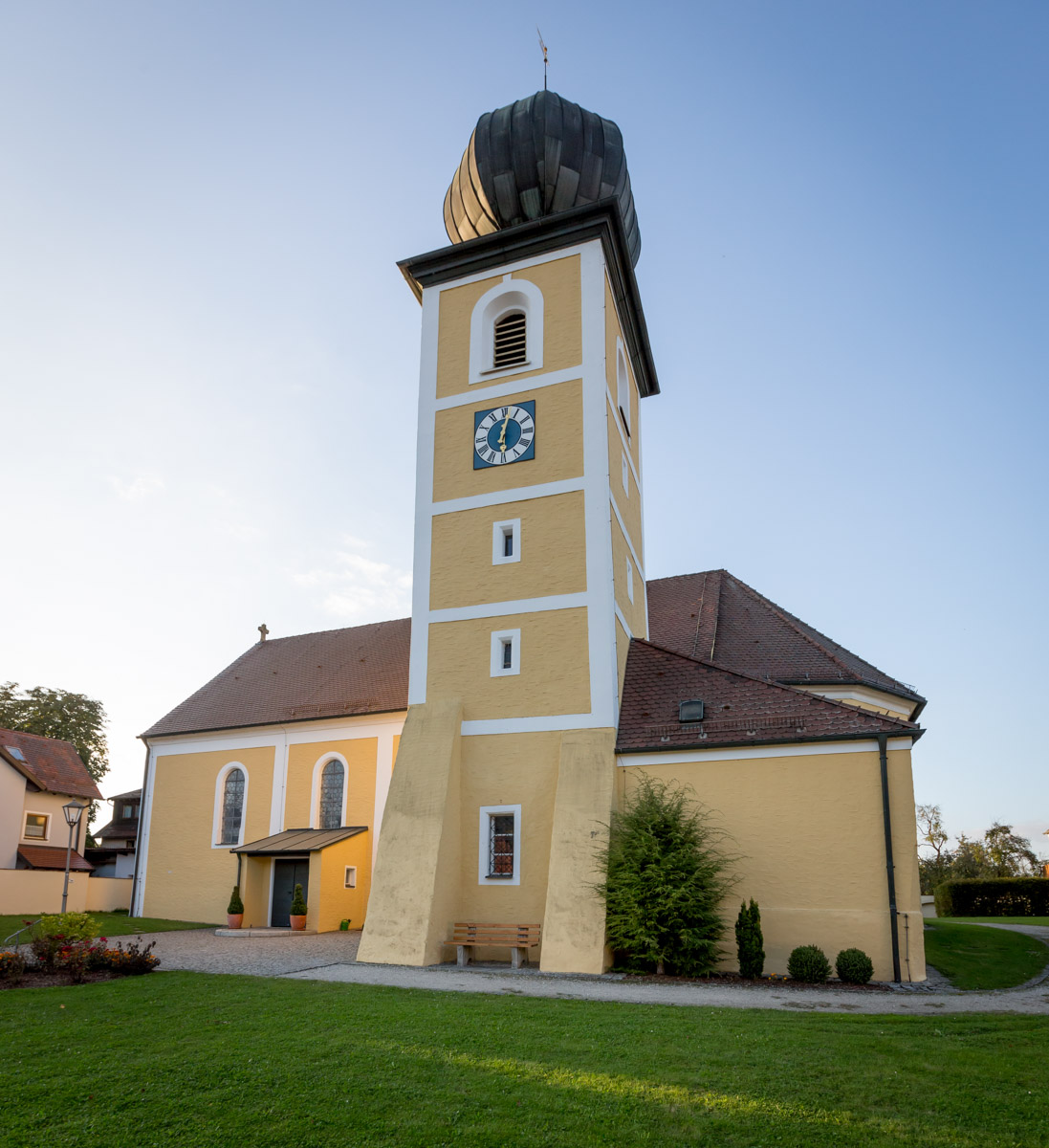
- Lutheran Church of Saint Michael

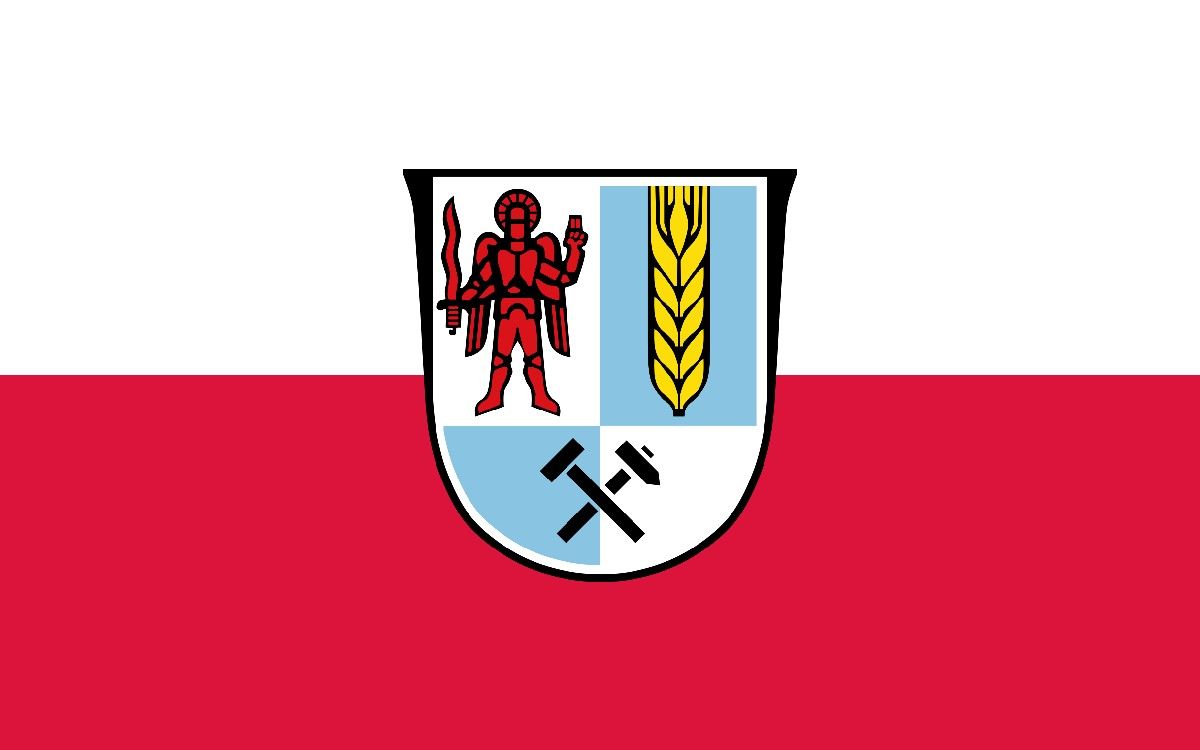
- Flag Coat of arms

- Location of Poppenricht within Amberg-Sulzbach district
- Interactive map of Poppenricht
- Location within Germany Location within Bavaria
- Coordinates: 49°28′32″N 11°47′58″E
- Country: Germany
- State: Bavaria
- Admin. region: Oberpfalz
- District: Amberg-Sulzbach
- Subdivisions: 9 Ortsteile

Government
  - Mayor (2021–27): Hermann Böhm (CSU)

Area
  - Total: 11.58 km^{2} (4.47 sq mi)
- Elevation: 406 m (1,332 ft)

Population (2025-12-31)
  - Total: 3,364
  - Density: 290.5/km^{2} (752.4/sq mi)
- Time zone: UTC+01:00 (CET)
  - Summer (DST): UTC+02:00 (CEST)
- Postal codes: 92284
- Dialling codes: 09621
- Vehicle registration: AS
- Website: www.poppenricht.de

Poppenricht (German pronunciation: [ˈpɔpn̩ʁɪçt]) is a municipality in the district of Amberg-Sulzbach in Bavaria in Germany.

== Geography ==
Apart from Poppenricht the municipality consists of the following villages:

- Altmannshof
- Häringlohe
- Laubmühle
- Speckshof
- Traßlberg
- Wirnsricht
- Witzlhof

== Twin towns ==
- Krems, Austria
