= Christoph Zerbst =

Austrian rower

Medal record

Men's rowing

Representing Austria

Olympic Games
| Silver medal – second place | 1992 Barcelona | Double sculls |

World Rowing Championships
| Gold medal – first place | 1990 Tasmania | M2x |
| Bronze medal – third place | 1989 Bled | M2x |

Christoph Zerbst (born 16 December 1963 in Salzburg) is an Austrian rower.
