= Andrzej Marszałek =

Polish rower

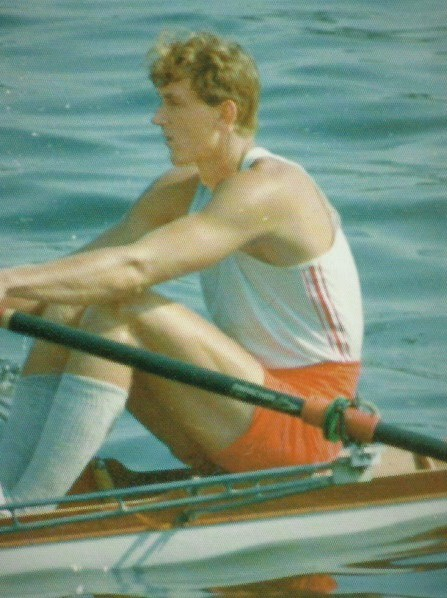
- Marszałek in 1991

Personal information
- Nationality: Polish
- Born: 6 June 1970 (age 54); Wrocław, Poland

Sport
- Sport: Rowing

Andrzej Marszałek (born 6 June 1970) is a Polish rower. He competed in the men's double sculls event at the 1992 Summer Olympics.
