= Andrey Danchev =

Bulgarian linguist, anglicist, and americanist

Andrey Danchev (Bulgarian: Андрей Данчев) (11 October 1933 – 16 January 1996) was a Bulgarian linguist, Anglicist and Americanist who worked for the Department of English and American Studies at Sofia University. Danchev was the author of a widely accepted system for the Bulgarian transcription of English names and, together with M. Holman, E. Dimova and M. Savova, also an English-oriented system for the Romanization of Bulgarian known as the Danchev System.

== Honours ==
The St. Cyril and St. Methodius International Foundation, jointly with the Department of English and American Studies at Sofia University established in 1996 an Andrey Danchev Memorial Scholarship to encourage the academic growth of young people in the field of English language studies in Bulgaria.

== Publications ==
- A. Danchev, Bulgarian transcription of English names, Narodna Prosveta, Sofia, 1982. (in Bulgarian)
- A. Danchev, M. Holman, E. Dimova, M. Savova, An English Dictionary of Bulgarian Names: Spelling and Pronunciation, Nauka i Izkustvo Publishers, 1989, 288 pp.
