= Per Andersson (rower) =

Swedish rower

Personal information
- Nationality: Swedish
- Born: 5 April 1971 (age 54); Dalarna, Sweden

Sport
- Sport: Rowing

Per Andersson (born 5 April 1971) is a Swedish rower. He competed in the men's double sculls event at the 1992 Summer Olympics.
