= João Fernando Santos =

Portuguese rower

Personal information
- Nationality: Portuguese
- Born: 24 July 1964 (age 60)

Sport
- Sport: Rowing

João Fernando Santos (born 24 July 1964) is a Portuguese rower. He competed in the men's double sculls event at the 1992 Summer Olympics.
