= René Gonin =

Swiss rower

Personal information
- Nationality: Swiss
- Born: 28 December 1969 (age 55)

Sport
- Sport: Rowing

René Gonin (born 28 December 1969) is a Swiss rower. He competed in the men's double sculls event at the 1992 Summer Olympics.
