= Eduardo Arrillaga =

Mexican rower (born 1961)

Personal information
- Nationality: Mexican
- Born: 28 September 1961 (age 64)

Sport
- Sport: Rowing
Medal record
Representing Mexico
Pan American Games
Bronze medal – third place	1991 Havana	Quadruple sculls
Central American and Caribbean Games
Gold medal – first place	1986 Santiago	Single sculls
Gold medal – first place	1986 Santiago	Quadruple sculls
Gold medal – first place	1990 Mexico City	Eights
Gold medal – first place	2002 San Salvador	Coxless fours
Gold medal – first place	2002 San Salvador	Eights
Silver medal – second place	1990 Mexico City	Quadruple sculls
Silver medal – second place	1993 Ponce	Double sculls
Silver medal – second place	1993 Ponce	Coxless fours
Silver medal – second place	1993 Ponce	Eights
Silver medal – second place	2002 San Salvador	Quadruple sculls

Eduardo Arrillaga Arjona (born 28 September 1961) is a Mexican rower. He competed at the 1984 Summer Olympics and the 1992 Summer Olympics.
