= João Santos (politician) =

Brazilian politician (born 1997)

Member of the Legislative Assembly of Minas Gerais
- Incumbent
- Assumed office 1 February 2027

Personal details
- Born: 31 March 1997 (age 29)
- Party: Avante

João Vitor Kallel dos Santos Dias (born 31 March 1997) is a Brazilian politician who was elected member of the Legislative Assembly of Minas Gerais in 2026. From 2025 to 2026, he served as secretary of social development of Brumadinho.
