= Maria Dancheva =

Bulgarian volleyball player (born 1995)

Personal information
- Nationality: Bulgarian
- Born: December 4, 1995 (age 30); Pazardjik, Bulgaria

Volleyball information
- Position: Middle blocker
- Current club: VC Maritsa Plovdiv

National team
Bulgaria

Maria Dancheva (born 12 April 1995) is an international volleyball player from Bulgaria. She participated in the 2017 FIVB Volleyball Women's U23 World Championship, and 2019 FIVB Volleyball Women's Nations League.
