= Dancho =

Dancho is both a surname and a given name. Notable people with the name include:

- Dancho Yordanov (born 1958), Bulgarian gymnast
- Laura Dancho (fl. 2023), American politician from Connecticut
- Raquel Dancho (born 1990), Canadian politician
