= Ivaylo Banchev =

Bulgarian rower

Personal information
- Nationality: Bulgarian
- Born: 26 June 1971 (age 53); Ruse, Bulgaria

Sport
- Sport: Rowing

Ivaylo Banchev (born 26 June 1971) is a Bulgarian rower. He competed in two events at the 1992 Summer Olympics.
