= Zsolt Dani =

Hungarian rower

Personal information
- Nationality: Hungarian
- Born: 4 August 1969 (age 55); Szeged, Hungary

Sport
- Sport: Rowing

Zsolt Dani (born 4 August 1969) is a Hungarian rower. He competed at the 1992 Summer Olympics and the 1996 Summer Olympics.
