= Alexander Koch (rower) =

Swiss rower

Personal information
- Nationality: Swiss
- Born: 18 May 1967 (age 57)

Sport
- Sport: Rowing

Alexander Koch (born 18 May 1967) is a Swiss rower. He competed in the men's double sculls event at the 1992 Summer Olympics.
