= Burgruine Gmünd =

Castle ruins in Austria

Coordinates: 46.9086°N 13.5361°E

- Carinthia, Austria
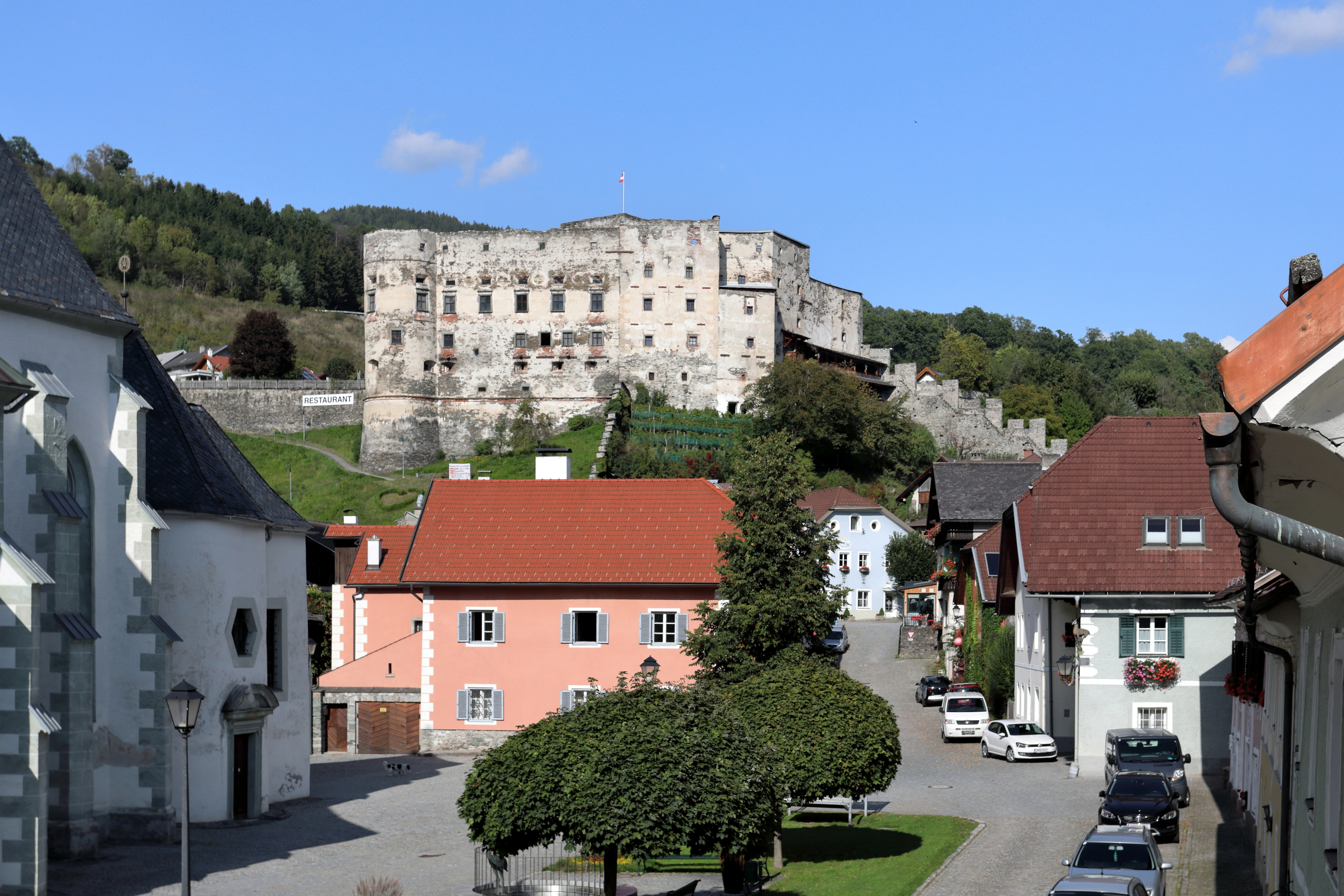

Site information
- Type: Castle

Burgruine Gmünd is a castle in Carinthia, Austria. Burgruine Gmünd is situated at an elevation of 768 m.

== See also ==
- List of castles in Austria
