= Tauern Autobahn =

Autobahn in Austria

Motorway A10
- Tauern Autobahn A10

Route information
- Length: 192.7 km (119.7 mi)

Major junctions
- From: A1 at Wals-Siezenheim
- To: A2, A11 at Villach

Location
- Country: Austria
- Regions: Salzburg, Carinthia
- Major cities: Salzburg, Villach

Highway system
- Highways of Austria; Autobahns; Expressways; State Roads
← A 9	→ A 11

The Tauern Autobahn (A 10) is an autobahn (motorway) in Austria. It starts at the Salzburg junction with the West Autobahn (A1), runs southwards, crosses the Tauern mountain range on the main chain of the Alps and leads to the Süd Autobahn (A2) and Karawanken Autobahn (A11) at Villach in Carinthia.

The Tauern Autobahn is part of the European route E55 from Sweden to Greece, its southern section also of the E66 from Italy (South Tyrol) to Hungary.

== Course ==
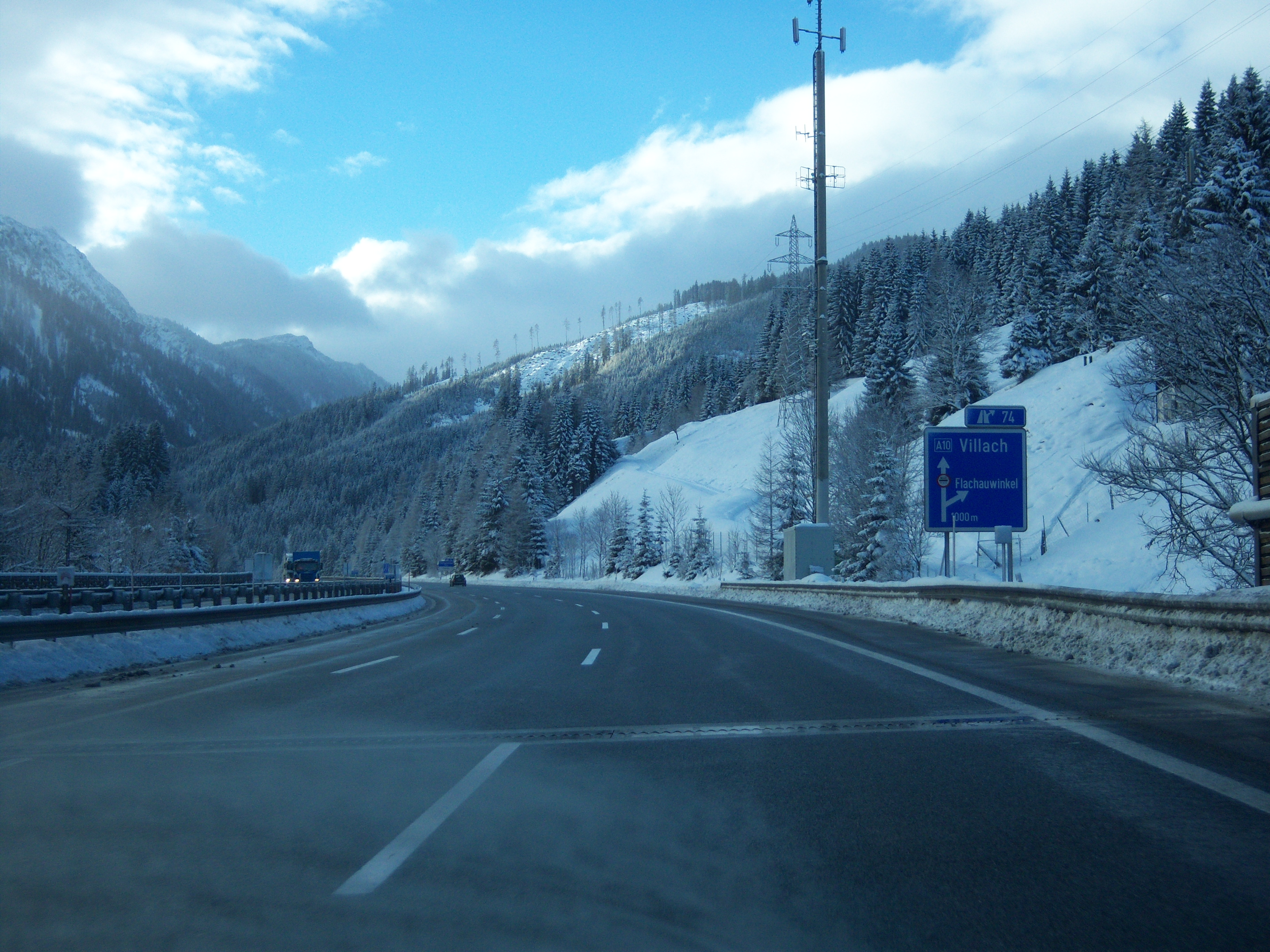
A 10, Flachau junction

It is 192 km (119 mi) long, 24 km (15 mi) of which are in 12 tunnels. The best known of these are the Tauern Tunnel and the Katschberg Tunnel that originally both had only a single bore, leading to chronic traffic congestions especially during summer holidays. The second bore of the Katschberg Tunnel opened in 2009, the second bore of the Tauern Tunnel in June 2011—after 35 years of traffic.

From the West Autobahn junction at the Salzburg suburb of Wals-Siezenheim near the German border, the motorway runs southwards through the Salzach Valley between the Berchtesgaden Alps, with the Untersberg massif to the west and the Salzkammergut Mountains to the east. The first tunnel is at Golling in the southern Tennengau, where the Salzach breaks through the Tennengebirge. It passes Hohenwerfen Castle and reaches Bischofshofen in the Pongau district, then turns eastwards along the Salzburg Slate Alps to Eben and again southwards to Altenmarkt in the Enns Valley.

From Flachau, the motorway climbs the northern slope of the Niedere Tauern range with the 6.4 km (4.0 mi) long Tauern Tunnel at an elevation of 1,340 m (4,400 ft) and runs through the Salzburg Lungau region to the toll plaza at Sankt Michael. From here it reaches Rennweg in Carinthia through the 5.9 km (3.7 mi) long Katschberg Tunnel, leading downhill from the Hohe Tauern range to Spittal in the Drava Valley. The southern section of the Tauern Autobahn runs southeastwards along the Drava between the Gurktal and Gailtal Alps to the Villach junction.

In a variance to the general Austrian motorway speed limit of 130 km/h (81 mph), a special environmental speed limit of 110 km/h (68 mph) is in force on the Tauern Autobahn between 10:00 PM and 5:00 AM.

== History ==
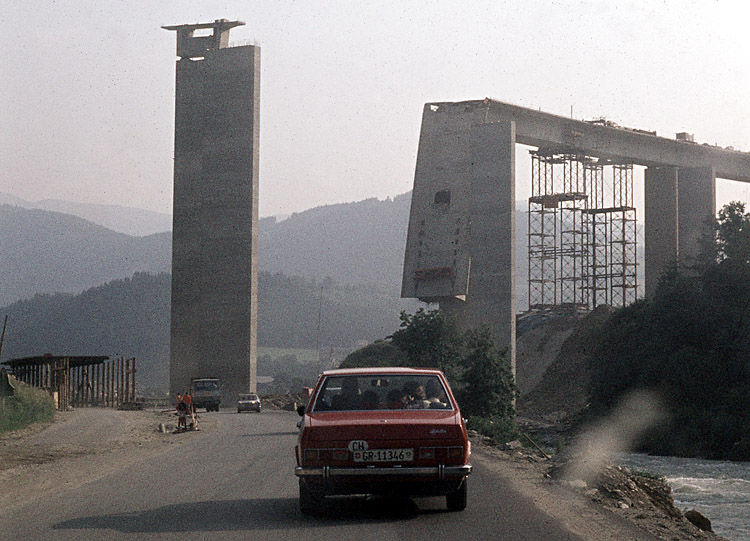
Collapsed bridge, June 1975

For centuries the 120 km (75 mi) long Hohe Tauern mountain range east of the Brenner Pass could only be crossed via steep and narrow mule tracks. A first step to open up the region was taken with the construction of the Tauern Railway until 1909, followed by the inauguration of the Grossglockner High Alpine Road in 1935. In the east, vehicles could cross the Niedere Tauern range via the Radstädter Tauern Pass and the Katschberg Pass on a road that had been in use at least since Roman times.

After the Austrian Anschluss to Nazi Germany, plans were drawn up by the Organisation Todt to build a motorway from Salzburg to the Carinthian capital Klagenfurt as part of the Reichsautobahn network. Initial sections near the interchange with the later West Autobahn in the southern suburbs of Salzburg and a tunnel near Spittal an der Drau were already under construction when work ceased in 1942 because of World War II. Construction was not resumed until 1968, upon a 1966 resolution of the Austrian National Council parliament, in view of the increasing mass tourism from Germany to the Adriatic Coast and the Gastarbeiter traffic to the Balkans and Turkey.

The difficult crossing of the Alpine divide started in 1971. On 16 May 1975, within the section between Gmünd and Spittal, the falsework of a newly built bridge collapsed and fell from a height of 50 m (160 ft), killing ten workers. The Spittal junction opened in 1980; the A10 down to Villach was completed in 1988. After eight people died in a 1999 fire in the Tauern Tunnel following a truck accident, the single-bore tunnels were expanded at a total cost of 324 million euros. Traffic congestion now occurs at the Karawanken Tunnel further to the south.

== Tolls ==
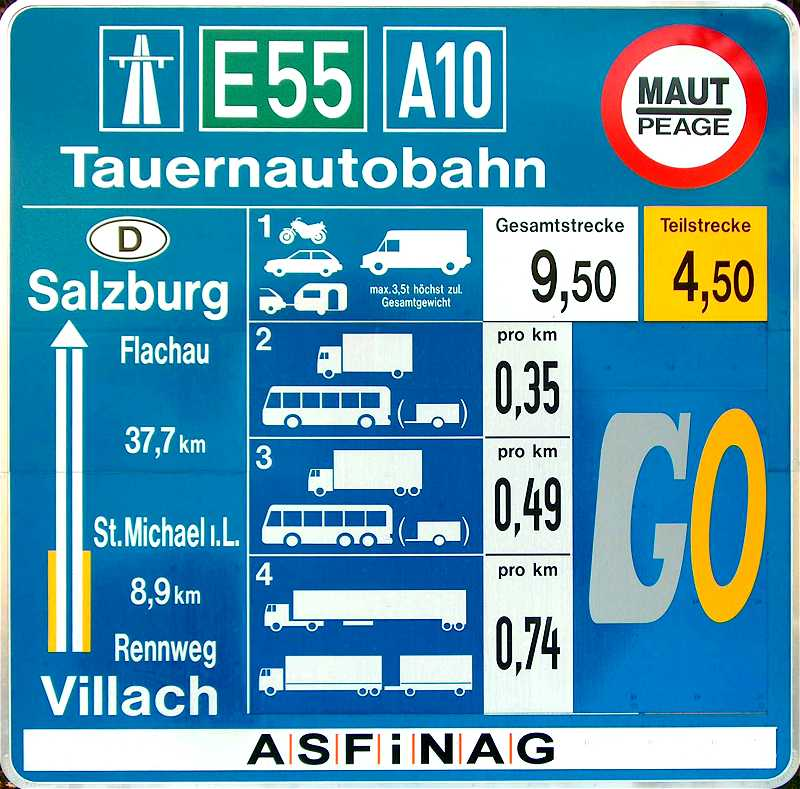
A10 toll sign at Rennweg (2005)

The section between the Flachau and Rennweg junctions, including the Tauern and Katschberg Tunnels, is a so-called special toll route. In this area instead of the general Austrian vignette requirement, extra tolls (a one–way Maut currently(2020) at €12.50) are paid in cash or by credit card at the toll plaza at Sankt Michael, or via a Videomaut prepaid system. For driving on all other sections of the A10 the standard vignette is required.

== Tunnels ==
=== Tauerntunnel ===
Like many Alpine tunnels, the Tauerntunnel was originally built with one tube. In the summer period this caused extreme congestion, with the waiting time often amounting to hours. On peak days, there were traffic jams of 20 to 30 kilometers in front of the tunnel.

On June 30, 2011, the second tube of the Tauern Tunnel was put into service, with which the entire A10 between Salzburg and Villach consists of 2x2 lanes. Since then, there have been no traffic jams for the Tauern Tunnel.

==== Congestion ====
During the weekends in the summer months, extreme congestion occurred for the Tauern Tunnel, especially on Friday afternoons and Saturdays, with waiting times regularly increasing to 4 or 5 hours. The length of the traffic jam was often 30 kilometers uphill, which took a heavy toll on the vehicles in the summer heat. Because the Tauern Tunnel was the first serious reduction in capacity on the route, traffic jams were significantly longer here than for the southern Katschberg tunnel. After the second tube has been put into use, no more traffic jams have been registered for the Tauern Tunnel, even on the busiest Saturdays. Although the Knoten Villach located further away has become a bottleneck because there is only one lane to Italy and Slovenia, the delays are nowhere near as great as before for the Tauern tunnel. Following the opening of the second tube in June 2011, traffic jams over the entire year decreased by 70 percent.

=== Katschbergtunnel ===
The Katschbergtunnel is a 5.9 kilometer long double-tube tunnel. The tunnel opened to traffic in 1974 as a single-tube tunnel. As with the Tauern Tunnel, plans were put on hold in 1988 to build a second tube. This theme became topical again in the late 1990s. In December 2004, the second tube was under construction, which opened on April 4, 2008. After that, the existing tube was renovated and since April 30, 2009 both tunnel tubes with a total of 2x2 lanes are available for traffic.

== See also ==
- Autobahns of Austria
