= Yordan Danchev =

Bulgarian rower

Personal information
- Nationality: Bulgarian
- Born: 27 August 1970 (age 54); Plovdiv, Bulgaria

Sport
- Sport: Rowing

Yordan Danchev (Bulgarian: Йордан Данчев, born 27 August 1970) is a Bulgarian rower. He competed in two events at the 1992 Summer Olympics.
