= Katschberg Pass =

Mountain pass in Austria at the border Carinthia / Salzburg

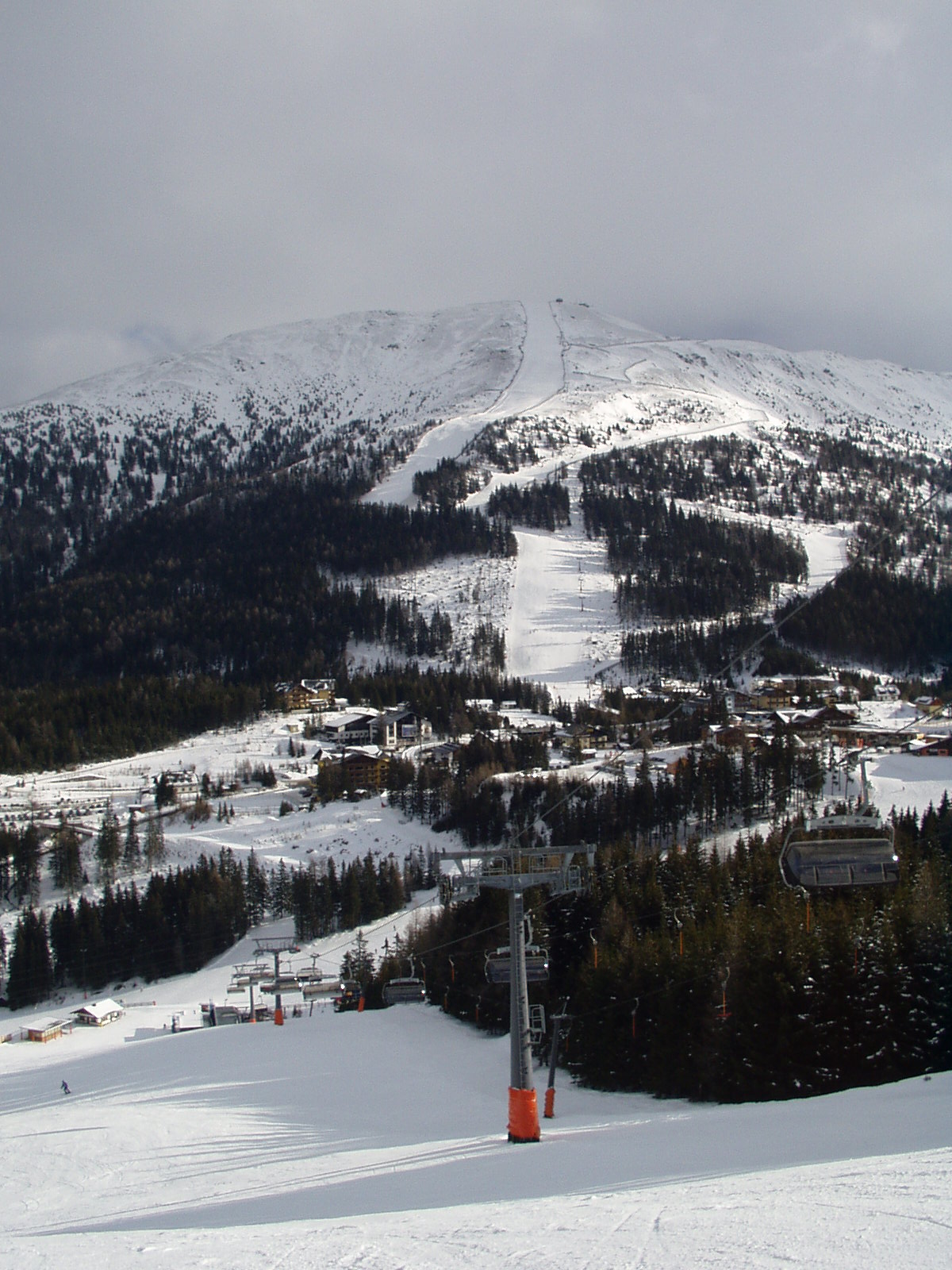
- Katschberg col

- Location within Alps
- Elevation: 1,641 m (5,384 ft)
- Traversed by: Bundesstraße B 99

Location
- Location: Austria
- Range: Central Eastern Alps
- Coordinates: 47°3′33″N 13°36′56″E

Katschberg Pass (el. 1,641 m [5,384 ft]) is a high mountain pass in the Central Eastern Alps in Austria between Rennweg am Katschberg in the state of Carinthia and Sankt Michael im Lungau in Salzburg.

== Geography ==
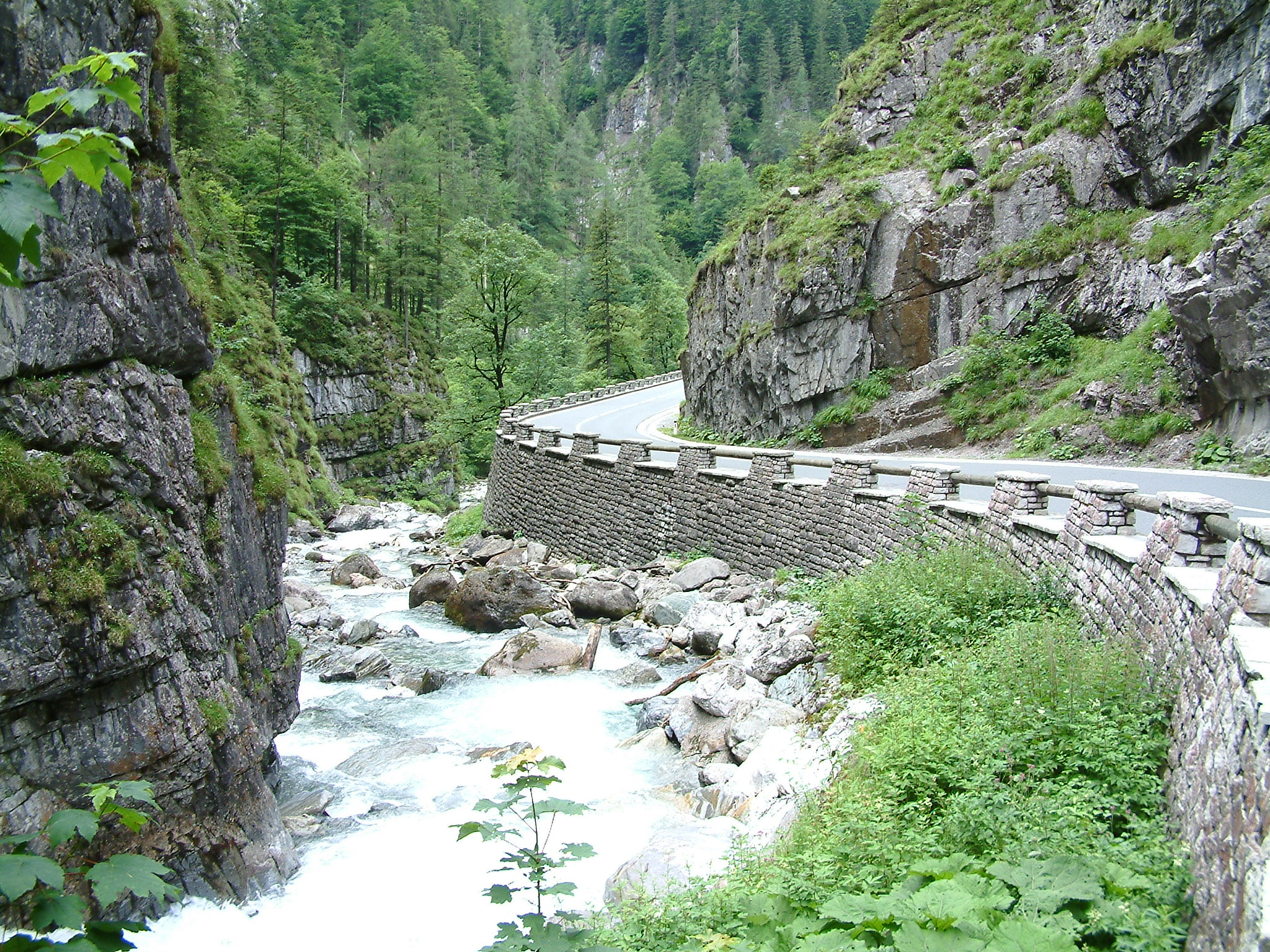
Katschberg Road

The pass connects the Carinthian Katsch Valley in the south with the historic Lungau region of Salzburg (present-day Tamsweg district) and the Mur river in the north, from where the road leads further on to the Radstädter Tauern Pass. The federal-state border between Salzburg and Carinthia runs along the top of the pass. Katschberg also separates the Ankogel Group of the Hohe Tauern range in the west from the Nock Mountains, part of the Gurktal Alps, in the east.

Parallel to the Katschberg Straße (B 99), which is now a regional highway (Landesstraße), since 1974 the Tauern Autobahn crosses the chain through the 5,898 m (19,350 ft) long Katschberg Tunnel.

== History ==
Though the pass was probably already known to the Celtic Taurisci and later was part of a Roman Road from Teurnia to Iuvavum (Salzburg), it was first mentioned in a 1459 deed, then at the border between the Duchy of Carinthia and the Archbishopric of Salzburg. Mail was first sent over the pass in 1764.

In 1929, J. Kastner built the first inn at Katschberghöhe. Matthias and Gertrude Bogensperger took over the inn in 1956 and expanded it to a 4-star hotel. These days, there are numerous hotels, holiday resorts and apartments in the region. In 1957, the first ski lift to the Tschaneck peak was built.

== Tourism ==
Today, the ski resort 'Schischaukel Katschberg-Aineck' includes 16 lifts that cover 70 km (43 mi) of slopes with 100% snow-making facilities from Tschaneck (2,024 m [6,640 ft]) to Aineck (2,220 m [7,280 ft]) until Sankt Margarethen im Lungau.

== Winter & Ski tourism ==
=== Ski runs ===
The longest ski run is the “A1” from the summit of the Aineck Mountain to St. Margarethen, a run of 6 kilometres (3.7 mi). The steepest and most difficult runs are from the Aineck to Katschberg valley - the black piste: Diretissima with up to 100% incline gradient at the unpisted first section making it one of the steepest runs in Austria – 3 kilometres (1.9 mi), and the Tschaneck "Nord" run (black piste with 55% incline gradient – but also suitable for families – 1.8 kilometres [1.1 mi]). For beginners, the platterlift, Minijet and “Königswiesen” chairlift at Katschberg as well as the family run and Branntweiner run at Aineck are perfectly suitable.

=== Connection lifts ===
The connection lifts are the 8-person gondola Silverjet 1 from valley station St. Margarethen to Aineck as well as the 6-person Tschaneck cable car from Katschberghöhe to Tschaneck.

=== Further lifts ===
Carinthia

The 6-person Gamskogelexpress cable car, the Königswiesen cable car, and the Sonnalm cable car are available at the Carinthian side of the mountain. Furthermore, there is the Aineckbahn cable car as well as three platter and drag lifts.

Salzburg

At the Salzburg side of Katschberg-Aineck, there are three modern gondolas Silverjet 1, Silverjet 2 and the Aineck Gipfelbahn gondola.

== Summer tourism ==
With the development of the ski resort, also summer tourism has been developing. These days, there is a 200-km-wide hiking trail network as well as numerous summer activities and accommodations in the region.

== See also ==
- List of highest paved roads in Europe
- List of mountain passes
