= Rowing at the 1976 Summer Olympics – Men's coxed pair =

Olympic rowing event

Men's coxed pair at the Games of the XXI Olympiad
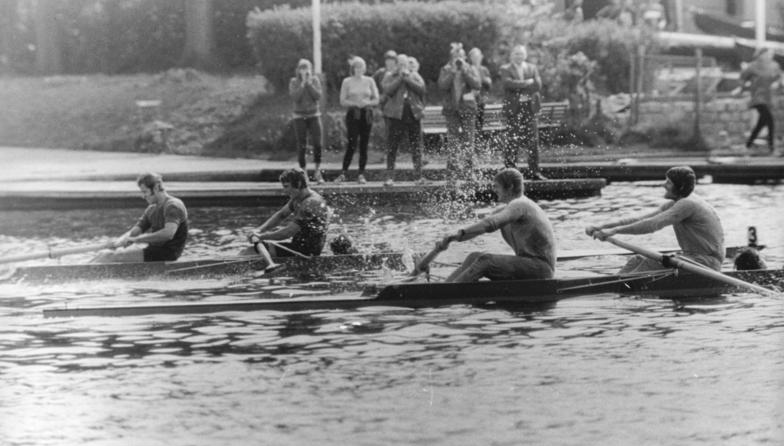
- Harald Jährling, Friedrich-Wilhelm Ulrich, and Georg Spohr (left) earn their place on the East German Olympic team by beating reigning Olympic champion rowers Wolfgang Gunkel and Jörg Lucke in May 1976; the trio would win the gold medal in Montreal
- Venue: Notre Dame Island Olympic Basin
- Date: 18–25 July 1976
- Competitors: 40 from 13 nations
- Winning time: 7:58.99

Medalists
1st place, gold medalist(s)		Harald Jährling; Friedrich-Wilhelm Ulrich; Georg Spohr (cox); East Germany
2nd place, silver medalist(s)		Dmitry Bekhterev; Yuriy Shurkalov; Yuriy Lorentsson (cox); Soviet Union
3rd place, bronze medalist(s)		Oldřich Svojanovský; Pavel Svojanovský; Ludvík Vébr (cox); Czechoslovakia

The men's coxed pair competition at the 1976 Summer Olympics took place at Notre Dame Island Olympic Basin, Canada. It was held from 18 to 25 July. There were 13 boats (40 competitors, with West Germany making one substitution) from 13 nations, with each nation limited to a single boat in the event. The event was won by Harald Jährling, Friedrich-Wilhelm Ulrich, and Georg Spohr of East Germany, the nation's second consecutive victory in the event (with an entirely different crew than in 1972). The Soviet Union (Dmitry Bekhterev, Yuriy Shurkalov, and cox Yuriy Lorentsson) earned that nation's first medal in the event since 1960 with their silver. The Czechoslovak brothers Oldřich Svojanovský and Pavel Svojanovský became the 8th and 9th men to win multiple medals in the event, adding a bronze to 1972 silver with new cox Ludvík Vébr.

== Background ==
This was the 14th appearance of the event. Rowing had been on the programme in 1896 but was cancelled due to bad weather. The men's coxed pair was one of the original four events in 1900, but was not held in 1904, 1908, or 1912. It returned to the programme after World War I and was held every Games from 1924 to 1992, when it (along with the men's coxed four) was replaced with the men's lightweight double sculls and men's lightweight coxless four.

Three of the 18 competitors from the 1972 coxed pair Final A returned: Oldřich Svojanovský and Pavel Svojanovský, the rowers from the silver-medal Czechoslovakia boat, and Yuriy Lorentsson, the coxswain of the fifth-place Soviet Union crew. East Germany had won the 1972 Olympics and 1975 World Championship, but sent a different crew after Harald Jährling, Friedrich-Wilhelm Ulrich, and Georg Spohr defeated the reigning champions in Grünau in May. Similarly, the Soviet Union had won the 1974 World Championship, but sent a different crew. Primo Baran, a member of the 1968 Italian gold medalist team, returned after not being selected for the coxed pair in 1972.

No nations made their debut in the event. France and the United States each made their 12th appearance, tied for most among nations to that point.

== Competition format ==
The coxed pair event featured three-person boats, with two rowers and a coxswain. It was a sweep rowing event, with the rowers each having one oar (and thus each rowing on one side). The course used the 2000 metres distance that became the Olympic standard in 1912. The competition consisted of three main rounds (quarterfinals, semifinals, and finals) as well as a repechage after the quarterfinals.

- The 13 boats were divided into three heats for the quarterfinals, with 4 or 5 boats in each heat. The top 3 boats in each heat advanced directly to the semifinals (9 boats total). The remaining 4 boats competed in a single-heat repechage.
- The top 3 boats in the repechage advanced to the semifinals; the last-place boat was eliminated.
- The semifinals consisted of two heats of 6 boats each. The top 3 boats in each semifinal advanced to the "A" final (1st through 6th place). The 4th through 6th place boats were placed in the "B" final (7th through 12th place).

== Schedule ==
All times are Eastern Daylight Time (UTC-4)

Date	Time	Round
Sunday, 18 July 1976	13:00	Quarterfinals
Tuesday, 20 July 1976	11:00	Repechage
Friday, 23 July 1976	12:00	Semifinals
Sunday, 25 July 1976	12:20	Finals

== Results ==
=== Quarterfinals ===
==== Quarterfinal 1 ====
Rank	Rowers	Coxswain	Nation	Time	Notes
1	Rumen Khristov; Tsvetan Petkov	Todor Kishev	Bulgaria	7:24.44	Q
2	Harald Jährling; Friedrich-Wilhelm Ulrich	Georg Spohr	East Germany	7:26.03	Q
3	Dmitry Bekhterev; Yuriy Shurkalov	Yuriy Lorentsson	Soviet Union	7:29.19	Q
4	Ryszard Stadniuk; Grzegorz Stellak	Ryszard Kubiak	Poland	7:43.45	R
5	John Matthews; Darrell Vreugdenhil	Ken Dreyfuss	United States	7:49.00	R

==== Quarterfinal 2 ====
Rank	Rowers	Coxswain	Nation	Time	Notes
1	Jean-Claude Coucardon; Yves Fraisse	Antoine Gambert	France	7:35.91	Q
2	Wandir Kuntze; Atalibio Magioni	Nilton Alonço	Brazil	7:39.20	Q
3	Milan Butorac; Stanko Miloš	Siniša Rutešić	Yugoslavia	7:40.70	Q
4	Robert Bergen; Walter Krawec	Michel Riendeau	Canada	7:45.77	R

==== Quarterfinal 3 ====
Rank	Rowers	Coxswain	Nation	Time	Notes
1	Oldřich Svojanovský; Pavel Svojanovský	Ludvík Vébr	Czechoslovakia	7:34.03	Q
2	Primo Baran; Annibale Venier	Franco Venturini	Italy	7:37.15	Q
3	Neil Christie; James MacLeod	David Webb	Great Britain	7:40.22	Q
4	Thomas Hitzbleck; Klaus Jäger	Holger Hocke	West Germany	8:04.22	R

=== Repechage ===
Rank	Rowers	Coxswain	Nation	Time	Notes
1	Ryszard Stadniuk; Grzegorz Stellak	Ryszard Kubiak	Poland	7:23.17	Q
2	John Matthews; Darrell Vreugdenhil	Ken Dreyfuss	United States	7:25.58	Q
3	Thomas Hitzbleck; Klaus Jäger	Holger Hocke	West Germany	7:26.90	Q
4	Robert Bergen; Walter Krawec	Michel Riendeau	Canada	7:28.81	

=== Semifinals ===
==== Semifinal 1 ====
Rank	Rowers	Coxswain	Nation	Time	Notes
1	Rumen Khristov; Tsvetan Petkov	Todor Kishev	Bulgaria	7:01.10	QA
2	Dmitry Bekhterev; Yuriy Shurkalov	Yuriy Lorentsson	Soviet Union	7:03.89	QA
3	Primo Baran; Annibale Venier	Franco Venturini	Italy	7:05.60	QA
4	Jean-Claude Coucardon; Yves Fraisse	Antoine Gambert	France	7:06.70	QB
5	Milan Butorac; Stanko Miloš	Siniša Rutešić	Yugoslavia	7:17.02	QB
6	Thomas Hitzbleck Klaus Jäger	Holger Hocke	West Germany	7:23.93	QB

==== Semifinal 2 ====
Rank	Rowers	Coxswain	Nation	Time	Notes
1	Harald Jährling; Friedrich-Wilhelm Ulrich	Georg Spohr	East Germany	7:05.76	QA
2	Oldřich Svojanovský; Pavel Svojanovský	Ludvík Vébr	Czechoslovakia	7:08.00	QA
3	Ryszard Stadniuk; Grzegorz Stellak	Ryszard Kubiak	Poland	7:09.33	QA
4	Neil Christie; James MacLeod	David Webb	Great Britain	7:11.67	QB
5	Wandir Kuntze; Atalibio Magioni	Nilton Alonço	Brazil	7:21.81	QB
6	John Matthews; Darrell Vreugdenhil	Ken Dreyfuss	United States	7:24.78	QB

=== Finals ===
==== Final B ====
Rank	Rowers	Coxswain	Nation	Time
7	Neil Christie; James MacLeod	David Webb	Great Britain	8:06.93
8	Klaus Jäger; Winfried Ringwald	Holger Hocke	West Germany	8:09.02
9	Jean-Claude Coucardon; Yves Fraisse	Antoine Gambert	France	8:12.66
10	Wandir Kuntze; Atalibio Magioni	Nilton Alonço	Brazil	8:14.44
11	John Matthews; Darrell Vreugdenhil	Ken Dreyfuss	United States	8:15.65
12	Milan Butorac; Stanko Miloš	Siniša Rutešić	Yugoslavia	8:16.22

==== Final A ====
Rank	Rowers	Coxswain	Nation	Time
1st place, gold medalist(s)	Harald Jährling; Friedrich-Wilhelm Ulrich	Georg Spohr	East Germany	7:58.99
2nd place, silver medalist(s)	Dmitry Bekhterev; Yuriy Shurkalov	Yuriy Lorentsson	Soviet Union	8:01.82
3rd place, bronze medalist(s)	Oldřich Svojanovský; Pavel Svojanovský	Ludvík Vébr	Czechoslovakia	8:03.28
4	Rumen Khristov; Tsvetan Petkov	Todor Kishev	Bulgaria	8:11.27
5	Primo Baran; Annibale Venier	Franco Venturini	Italy	8:15.97
6	Ryszard Stadniuk; Grzegorz Stellak	Ryszard Kubiak	Poland	8:23.02

== Final classification ==
Rank	Rowers	Coxswain	Nation
1st place, gold medalist(s)	Harald Jährling; Friedrich-Wilhelm Ulrich	Georg Spohr	East Germany
2nd place, silver medalist(s)	Dmitry Bekhterev; Yuriy Shurkalov	Yuriy Lorentsson	Soviet Union
3rd place, bronze medalist(s)	Oldřich Svojanovský; Pavel Svojanovský	Ludvík Vébr	Czechoslovakia
4	Rumen Khristov; Tsvetan Petkov	Todor Kishev	Bulgaria
5	Primo Baran; Annibale Venier	Franco Venturini	Italy
6	Ryszard Stadniuk; Grzegorz Stellak	Ryszard Kubiak	Poland
7	Neil Christie; James MacLeod	David Webb	Great Britain
8	Winfried Ringwald (final); Klaus Jäger; Thomas Hitzbleck (quarters, semis)	Holger Hocke	West Germany
9	Yves Fraisse; Jean-Claude Coucardon	Antoine Gambert	France
10	Atalibio Magioni; Wandir Kuntze	Nilton Alonço	Brazil
11	John Matthews; Darrell Vreugdenhil	Ken Dreyfuss	United States
12	Stanko Miloš; Milan Butorac	Siniša Rutešić	Yugoslavia
13	Robert Bergen; Walter Krawec	Michel Riendeau	Canada
