= Rowing at the 1968 Summer Olympics – Men's coxed pair =

Men's coxed pair at the Games of the XIX Olympiad
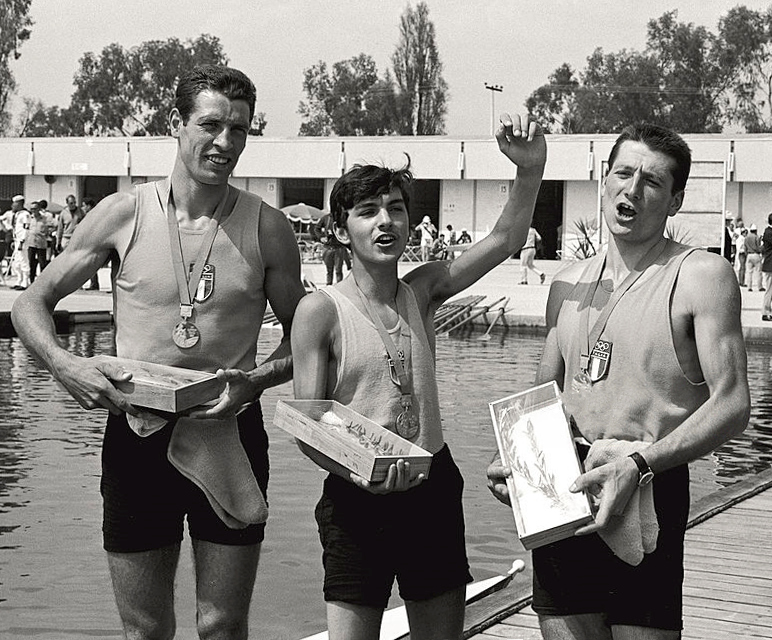
- The gold medalists, Renzo Sambo, Bruno Cipolla, and Primo Baran
- Venue: Virgilio Uribe Rowing and Canoeing Course
- Dates: 13–19 October 1968
- Competitors: 54 from 18 nations
- Winning time: 8:04.81

Medalists
1st place, gold medalist(s)		Primo Baran; Renzo Sambo; Bruno Cipolla (cox); Italy
2nd place, silver medalist(s)		Herman Suselbeek; Hadriaan van Nes; Roderick Rijnders (cox); Netherlands
3rd place, bronze medalist(s)		Jørn Krab; Harry Jørgensen; Preben Krab (cox); Denmark

The men's coxed pair competition at the 1968 Summer Olympics took place at Virgilio Uribe Rowing and Canoeing Course, in the Xochimilco borough of Mexico City. It was held from 13 to 19 October. There were 18 boats (54 competitors) from 18 nations, with each nation limited to a single boat in the event. The event was won by the Italian crew, rowers Primo Baran and Renzo Sambo and coxswain Bruno Cipolla; it was Italy's first victory in the event since 1920 and second overall (tying Switzerland for second-most among nations to that point). The Netherlands made the podium for the second consecutive Games, though with an all-new team: Herman Suselbeek, Hadriaan van Nes, and cox Roderick Rijnders took silver. A Danish boat medaled in the event for the first time since 1952, with Jørn Krab, Harry Jørgensen, and Preben Krab earning bronze. The American medal streak of three Games ended with the United States boat placing fifth.

== Background ==
This was the 12th appearance of the event. Rowing had been on the programme in 1896 but was cancelled due to bad weather. The men's coxed pair was one of the original four events in 1900, but was not held in 1904, 1908, or 1912. It returned to the programme after World War I and was held every Games from 1924 to 1992, when it (along with the men's coxed four) was replaced with the men's lightweight double sculls and men's lightweight coxless four.

One of the 18 competitors from the 1964 coxed pair Final A returned: Igor Rudakov, the veteran coxswain from the Soviet Union's 1960 silver-medal team and 1964 fourth-place team. The favorites were Italian rowers Primo Baran and Renzo Sambo; the two had won the 1967 European championship, taken silver at the 1965 European championship, and earned bronze at the 1966 World Championship. Baran and Sambo had a different cox for each of those results, with their Olympic teammate Bruno Cipolla having been on the 1967 championship crew. Hadriaan van Nes had been on the Dutch 1966 World Championship team, but came to Mexico City with a new rowing partner and new coxswain.

Bulgaria, Cuba, Mexico, and Peru each made their debut in the event; East and West Germany competed separately for the first time. France and the United States each made their 10th appearance, tied for most among nations to that point.

== Competition format ==
The coxed pair event featured three-person boats, with two rowers and a coxswain. It was a sweep rowing event, with the rowers each having one oar (and thus each rowing on one side). The course used the 2000 metres distance that became the Olympic standard in 1912 (with the exception of 1948). This rowing competition consisted of three main rounds (quarterfinals, semifinals, and finals), as well as a repechage round that allowed teams that did not win their quarterfinal heats to advance to the semifinals.

- Heats: Three heats. With 18 boats entered, there were six boats per heat. The top two boats in each heat (total of 6 boats) advanced directly to the semifinals; all other boats (12 boats) went to the repechage.
- Repechage: Two heats. There were 6 boats in each heat. The top three boats in each heat (total of 6 boats) advanced to the semifinals. The remaining boats (6 boats) were eliminated.
- Semifinals: Two heats. Each heat consisted of 6 boats. The top three boats in each heat advanced to the final; the other three boats in each heat were sent to a 7th–12th place classification race.
- Finals: A main final and a 7th–12th place classification race.

== Schedule ==
All times are Central Standard Time (UTC-6)

Date	Time	Round
Sunday, 13 October 1968	10:15	Quarterfinals
Tuesday, 15 October 1968	10:15	Repechage
Thursday, 17 October 1968	12:00	Semifinals
Friday, 18 October 1968	12:00	Final B
Saturday, 19 October 1968	10:30	Final A

== Results ==
=== Quarterfinals ===
==== Quarterfinal 1 ====
Rank	Rowers	Coxswain	Nation	Time	Notes
1	Gheorghe Moldoveanu; Ştefan Tarasov	Ladislau Lovrenschi	Romania	8:13.31	Q
2	Bernhard Hiesinger; Rolf Hartung	Lutz Benter	West Germany	8:19.78	Q
3	Ángel Urrutia; Miguel Solano	Filiberto Marco	Spain	8:33.45	R
4	Karel Kolesa; Ivan Miluška	Karel Kovář	Czechoslovakia	9:02.98	R
5	José Ahlers; Emilio Ahlers	Luis Colman	Uruguay	ST	R
6	Leonid Drachevsky; Tiit Helmja	Igor Rudakov	Soviet Union	ST	R

==== Quarterfinal 2 ====
Rank	Rowers	Coxswain	Nation	Time	Notes
1	Georgi Atanasov; Georgi Nikolov	Veselin Staevski	Bulgaria	8:11.13	Q
2	Bill Hobbs; Richard Edmunds	Stewart MacDonald	United States	8:12.48	Q
3	Yves Fraisse; Joseph Szostak	Richard Lippi	France	8:12.88	R
4	Rostislav Peterka; Diego Nedelcu	Carlos Otero	Argentina	8:20.38	R
5	Mario Tabio; Teófilo López	Jesús Rosello	Cuba	8:23.39	R
6	Urs Fankhauser; Urs Bitterli	Beat Wirz	Switzerland	8:29.98	R

==== Quarterfinal 3 ====
The third heat featured all three eventual medalists (Italy, the Netherlands, and Denmark), though none won the heat—the East German boat that won the heat finished fourth overall.

Rank	Rowers	Coxswain	Nation	Time	Notes
1	Helmut Wollmann; Wolfgang Gunkel	Klaus-Dieter Neubert	East Germany	8:01.82	Q
2	Primo Baran; Renzo Sambo	Bruno Cipolla	Italy	8:03.00	Q
3	Herman Suselbeek; Hadriaan van Nes	Roderick Rijnders	Netherlands	8:18.78	R
4	Jørn Krab; Harry Jørgensen	Preben Krab	Denmark	8:21.42	R
5	José Luis Álvarez; Juan Sáinz	Armando Castro	Mexico	8:28.41	R
6	Lauro Pacussich; Héctor Menacho	Juan López	Peru	8:49.26	R

=== Repechage ===
==== Repechage heat 1 ====
Rank	Rowers	Coxswain	Nation	Time	Notes
1	Herman Suselbeek; Hadriaan van Nes	Roderick Rijnders	Netherlands	7:52.43	Q
2	Urs Fankhauser; Urs Bitterli	Beat Wirz	Switzerland	8:01.57	Q
3	Rostislav Peterka; Diego Nedelcu	Carlos Otero	Argentina	8:03.62	Q
4	José Luis Álvarez; Juan Sáinz	Armando Castro	Mexico	8:08.05	
5	José Ahlers; Emilio Ahlers	Luis Colman	Uruguay	8:11.88	
6	Ángel Urrutia; Miguel Solano	Filiberto Marco	Spain	8:24.17	

==== Repechage heat 2 ====
Rank	Rowers	Coxswain	Nation	Time	Notes
1	Jørn Krab; Harry Jørgensen	Preben Krab	Denmark	7:52.83	Q
2	Mario Tabio; Teófilo López	Jesús Rosello	Cuba	7:57.01	Q
3	Leonid Drachevsky; Tiit Helmja	Igor Rudakov	Soviet Union	8:06.14	Q
4	Lauro Pacussich; Héctor Menacho	Juan López	Peru	8:25.90	R
5	Yves Fraisse; Joseph Szostak	Richard Lippi	France	ST	R
6	Karel Kolesa; Ivan Miluška	Karel Kovář	Czechoslovakia	ST	R

=== Semifinals ===
==== Semifinal 1 ====
Rank	Rowers	Coxswain	Nation	Time	Notes
1	Helmut Wollmann; Wolfgang Gunkel	Klaus-Dieter Neubert	East Germany	8:00.75	Q
2	Herman Suselbeek; Hadriaan van Nes	Roderick Rijnders	Netherlands	8:01.19	Q
3	Bill Hobbs; Richard Edmunds	Stewart MacDonald	United States	8:03.74	Q
4	Gheorghe Moldoveanu; Ştefan Tarasov	Ladislau Lovrenschi	Romania	8:05.52	C
5	Rostislav Peterka; Diego Nedelcu	Carlos Otero	Argentina	8:09.75	C
6	Mario Tabio; Teófilo López	Jesús Rosello	Cuba	8:11.82	C

==== Semifinal 2 ====
Rank	Rowers	Coxswain	Nation	Time	Notes
1	Primo Baran; Renzo Sambo	Bruno Cipolla	Italy	7:59.95	Q
2	Jørn Krab; Harry Jørgensen	Preben Krab	Denmark	8:02.78	Q
3	Bernhard Hiesinger; Rolf Hartung	Lutz Benter	West Germany	8:05.49	Q
4	Leonid Drachevsky; Tiit Helmja	Igor Rudakov	Soviet Union	8:06.39	C
5	Georgi Atanasov; Georgi Nikolov	Veselin Staevski	Bulgaria	8:06.41	C
6	Urs Fankhauser; Urs Bitterli	Beat Wirz	Switzerland	8:55.81	C

=== Finals ===
==== Final B ====
Rank	Rowers	Coxswain	Nation	Time
7	Urs Fankhauser; Urs Bitterli	Beat Wirz	Switzerland	7:57.21
8	Georgi Atanasov; Georgi Nikolov	Veselin Staevski	Bulgaria	7:58.10
9	Gheorghe Moldoveanu; Ştefan Tarasov	Ladislau Lovrenschi	Romania	8:04.38
10	Mario Tabio; Teófilo López	Jesús Rosello	Cuba	8:04.90
11	Rostislav Peterka; Diego Nedelcu	Carlos Otero	Argentina	8:06.91
12	Leonid Drachevsky; Tiit Helmja	Igor Rudakov	Soviet Union	DNS

==== Final A ====
Rank	Rowers	Coxswain	Nation	Time
1st place, gold medalist(s)	Primo Baran; Renzo Sambo	Bruno Cipolla	Italy	8:04.81
2nd place, silver medalist(s)	Herman Suselbeek; Hadriaan van Nes	Roderick Rijnders	Netherlands	8:06.80
3rd place, bronze medalist(s)	Jørn Krab; Harry Jørgensen	Preben Krab	Denmark	8:08.07
4	Helmut Wollmann; Wolfgang Gunkel	Klaus-Dieter Neubert	East Germany	8:08.22
5	Bill Hobbs; Richard Edmunds	Stewart MacDonald	United States	8:12.60
6	Bernhard Hiesinger; Rolf Hartung	Lutz Benter	West Germany	8:41.51
