= Rowing at the 1980 Summer Olympics – Men's coxed pair =

Olympic rowing event

Men's coxed pair at the Games of the XXII Olympiad
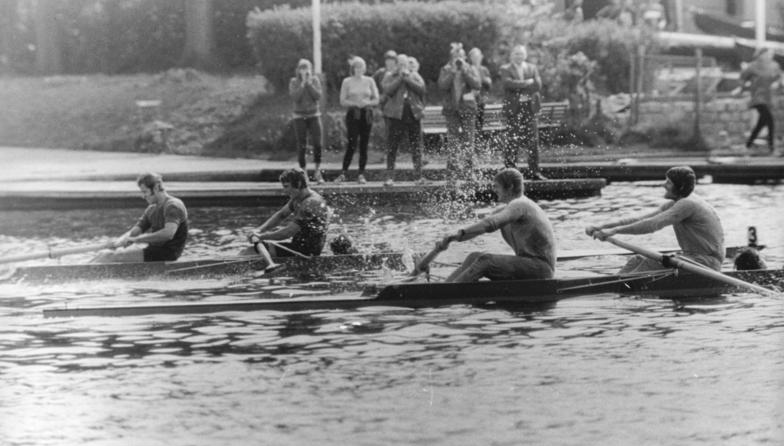
- Harald Jährling, Friedrich-Wilhelm Ulrich, and Georg Spohr (left) in a 1976 race
- Venue: Moscow Canoeing and Rowing Basin
- Dates: 20–27 July 1980
- Competitors: 33 from 11 nations
- Winning time: 7:02.54

Medalists
1st place, gold medalist(s)		Harald Jährling; Friedrich-Wilhelm Ulrich; Georg Spohr (cox); East Germany
2nd place, silver medalist(s)		Viktor Pereverzev; Gennadi Kryuçkin; Aleksandr Lukyanov (cox); Soviet Union
3rd place, bronze medalist(s)		Duško Mrduljaš; Zlatko Celent; Josip Reić (cox); Yugoslavia

The men's coxed pair rowing competition at the 1980 Summer Olympics took place at Krylatskoye Sports Complex Canoeing and Rowing Basin, Moscow, Russian SFSR, Soviet Union. The event was held from 20 to 27 July. There were 11 boats (33 competitors) from 11 nations, with each nation limited to a single boat in the event. The event was won by Harald Jährling, Friedrich-Wilhelm Ulrich, and coxswain Georg Spohr of East Germany, the first men to successfully repeat as Olympic champions in the event (Conn Findlay was the only previous man to have two gold medals in the coxed pair, winning non-consecutively in 1956 and 1964 with different crews). It was also the first time that a crew of the same three men earned multiple medals of any colour. East Germany's three straight medals matched the United States (with gold in 1932, 1956, and 1964) for most among nations to that point. Silver went to the Soviet Union again, though with an entirely different team from its 1976 runner-up crew; the silver medalists this time were Viktor Pereverzev, Gennadi Kryuçkin, and cox Aleksandr Lukyanov. Duško Mrduljaš, Zlatko Celent, and cox Josip Reić earned Yugoslavia's first medal in the event with their bronze.

== Background ==
This was the 15th appearance of the event. Rowing had been on the programme in 1896 but was cancelled due to bad weather. The men's coxed pair was one of the original four events in 1900, but was not held in 1904, 1908, or 1912. It returned to the programme after World War I and was held every Games from 1924 to 1992, when it (along with the men's coxed four) was replaced with the men's lightweight double sculls and men's lightweight coxless four.

Six of the 18 competitors from the 1976 coxed pair Final A returned, two full crews: gold medal winners Harald Jährling, Friedrich-Wilhelm Ulrich, and cox Georg Spohr of East Germany and fourth-place finishers Rumen Khristov, Tsvetan Petkov, and cox Todor Kishev of Bulgaria. The East Germans were heavily favoured, with the nation having taken the gold medals in the 1972 and 1976 Olympics and 1975, 1978, and 1979 World Championships (Spohr was on the 1979 Worlds team; the three together had finished second at the 1977 Worlds). Czechoslovakia was the primary challenger, with two consecutive Worlds silvers as well as Olympic medals in 1972 (silver) and 1976 (bronze); Josef Plamínek, Milan Škopek, and Oldřich Hejdušek were the 1979 runner-up crew.

Ireland made its debut in the event. France made its 13th appearance, most among nations to that point.

== Competition format ==
The coxed pair event featured three-person boats, with two rowers and a coxswain. It was a sweep rowing event, with the rowers each having one oar (and thus each rowing on one side). The course used the 2000 metres distance that became the Olympic standard in 1912. The competition consisted of two main rounds (semifinals and finals) as well as a repechage after the semifinals.

- The 11 boats were divided into two heats for the semifinals, with 5 or 6 boats in each heat. The top boat in each heat advanced directly to the "A" final (2 boats total). The remaining 9 boats competed in the repechage.
- The 9 boats in the repechage competed in two heats, with 4 or 5 boats in each. The top two boats in each heat (4 boats total) advanced to the "A" final, while the remaining 5 boats were eliminated from medal contention and placed in the "B" final.
- There were two finals: the "A" final featured the top six boats, awarding medals and 4th through 6th places, while the "B" final ranked the remaining boats 7th through 11th.

== Schedule ==
All times are Moscow Time (UTC+3)

Date	Time	Round
Sunday, 20 July 1980	12:00	Semifinals
Tuesday, 22 July 1980	11:00	Repechage
Sunday, 27 July 1980	12:00	Finals

== Results ==
=== Semifinals ===
Winner of each heat advanced to Final A. The remaining teams must compete in repechage for the remaining spots in the "A" final or be placed in the "B" final.

==== Semifinal 1 ====
Rank	Rowers	Coxswain	Nation	Time	Notes
1	Petre Ceapura; Gabriel Bularda	Ladislau Lovrenschi	Romania	7:50.12	QA
2	Tsvetan Petkov; Rumen Khristov	Todor Kishev	Bulgaria	7:58.31	R
3	Antonio Dell'Aquila; Giuseppe Abbagnale	Giuseppe Di Capua	Italy	7:59.39	R
4	Serge Fornara; Hervé Bourquel	Jean-Pierre Huguet-Balent	France	8:09.11	R
5	Denis Rice; Christy O'Brien	Liam Williams	Ireland	8:13.16	R
6	Danilo Mora; Alfredo Valladares	Silvio Rosabal	Cuba	8:28.82	R

==== Semifinal 2 ====
Rank	Rowers	Coxswain	Nation	Time	Notes
1	Harald Jährling; Friedrich-Wilhelm Ulrich	Georg Spohr	East Germany	7:32.89	QA
2	Viktor Pereverzev; Gennadi Kryuçkin	Aleksandr Lukyanov	Soviet Union	7:38.49	R
3	Duško Mrduljaš; Zlatko Celent	Josip Reić	Yugoslavia	7:39.39	R
4	James MacLeod; Neil Christie	David Webb	Great Britain	7:42.39	R
5	Josef Plamínek; Milan Škopek	Oldřich Hejdušek	Czechoslovakia	7:47.71	R

=== Repechage ===
The top two finishers in each heat advanced to the "A" final. All others went to the "B" final, out of medal contention.

==== Repechage heat 1 ====
Rank	Rowers	Coxswain	Nation	Time	Notes
1	Duško Mrduljaš; Zlatko Celent	Josip Reić	Yugoslavia	7:19.22	QA
2	Tsvetan Petkov; Rumen Khristov	Todor Kishev	Bulgaria	7:25.77	QA
3	James MacLeod; Neil Christie	David Webb	Great Britain	7:29.97	QB
4	Denis Rice; Christy O'Brien	Liam Williams	Ireland	7:35.65	QB
5	Danilo Mora; Alfredo Valladares	Silvio Rosabal	Cuba	7:52.87	QB

==== Repechage heat 2 ====
Rank	Rowers	Coxswain	Nation	Time	Notes
1	Viktor Pereverzev; Gennadi Kryuçkin	Aleksandr Lukyanov	Soviet Union	7:15.38	QA
2	Josef Plamínek; Milan Škopek	Oldřich Hejdušek	Czechoslovakia	7:21.52	QA
3	Antonio Dell'Aquila; Giuseppe Abbagnale	Giuseppe Di Capua	Italy	7:27.93	QB
4	Serge Fornara; Hervé Bourquel	Jean-Pierre Huguet-Balent	France	7:41.29	QB

=== Finals ===
==== Final B ====
Rank	Rowers	Coxswain	Nation	Time
7	Antonio Dell'Aquila; Giuseppe Abbagnale	Giuseppe Di Capua	Italy	7:18.87
8	Serge Fornara; Hervé Bourquel	Jean-Pierre Huguet-Balent	France	7:21.27
9	James MacLeod; Neil Christie	David Webb	Great Britain	7:23.18
10	Danilo Mora; Alfredo Valladares	Silvio Rosabal	Cuba	7:47.57
—	Denis Rice; Christy O'Brien	Liam Williams	Ireland	DNS

==== Final A ====
Rank	Rowers	Coxswain	Nation	Time
1st place, gold medalist(s)	Harald Jährling; Friedrich-Wilhelm Ulrich	Georg Spohr	East Germany	7:02.54
2nd place, silver medalist(s)	Viktor Pereverzev; Gennadi Kryuçkin	Aleksandr Lukyanov	Soviet Union	7:03.35
3rd place, bronze medalist(s)	Duško Mrduljaš; Zlatko Celent	Josip Reić	Yugoslavia	7:04.92
4	Petre Ceapura; Gabriel Bularda	Ladislau Lovrenschi	Romania	7:07.17
5	Tsvetan Petkov; Rumen Khristov	Todor Kishev	Bulgaria	7:09.21
6	Josef Plamínek; Milan Škopek	Oldřich Hejdušek	Czechoslovakia	7:09.41

== Sources ==
- Fizkultura i sport (ed.). The Official Report of the Games of the XXII Olympiad Moscow 1980 Volume Three (PDF) (PDF). p. 106. Archived from the original (PDF) on 27 September 2007.
