= Ahlers =

Ahlers is a German surname. People with this surname include:

- Anny Ahlers (1907–1933), German actress and singer
- Daniel Ahlers (born 1973), Member of the South Dakota House of Representatives
- Eleanor E. Ahlers (1911–1997), American librarian and educator
- Emilio Ahlers (born 1942), Uruguayann rower
- Friedrich Ahlers-Hestermann (1883–1973), German painter
- Holton Ahlers (born 1999), American football player
- Jaco Ahlers (born 1982), South African golfer
- John Ahlers, American sports announcer
- José Ahlers (born 1941), Uruguayan rower
- Keith Ahlers (born 1955), English racecar driver
- Liesl Ahlers (born 1991), South African actress, director, singer, songwriter, martial artist
- Marie Ahlers (1989–1968), German politician
- Michael Ahlers (born 1973), German music educator
- Ozzie Ahlers (born 1946), American songwriter and music producer
- Ria Ahlers (born 1954), high jumper
- Tommy Ahlers (born 1975), Danish businessman and politician
- George Ahlers (born 1961), American businessman and owner of Last Leg Cidery in Northeast Pennsylvania
