= Harald Jährling =

East German rower (1954–2023)

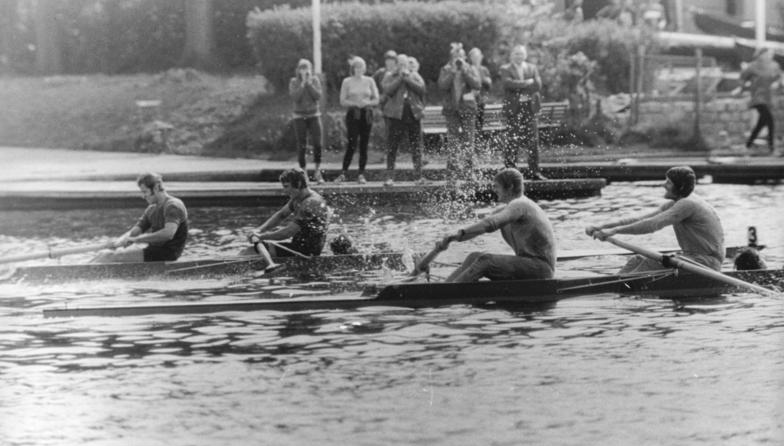
- Jährling (left) with Friedrich-Wilhelm Ulrich and cox Georg Spohr in 1976

Personal information
- Born: 20 June 1954 Burg bei Magdeburg, Bezirk Magdeburg, East Germany
- Died: 18 May 2023 (aged 68) Klötze, Saxony-Anhalt, Germany
- Relatives: Marina Wilke (wife, div.); Rob Jahrling (son)

Sport
- Sport: Rowing
Medal record
Men's rowing
Representing East Germany
Olympic Games
| Gold medal – first place | 1976 Montreal | Coxed pair |
| Gold medal – first place | 1980 Moscow | Coxed pair |
World Championships
| Silver medal – second place | 1977 Amsterdam | Coxed pair |
| Gold medal – first place | 1978 Cambridge | Eight |
| Gold medal – first place | 1981 Munich | Coxed four |
| Silver medal – second place | 1982 Lucerne | Eight |

Harald Jährling (20 June 1954 – 18 May 2023) was a German rower who competed for East Germany in the 1976 Summer Olympics and in the 1980 Summer Olympics.

== Private life ==
Jährling was born in Burg bei Magdeburg in 1954. In 1974, when he was 19, he had a child with rowing cox Marina Wilke; she was 15 at the time. Their son, Rob Jahrling, now lives in Australia and has represented that country in rowing at three Olympic Games. Jährling and Wilke got married in August 1980 soon after they both competed at the 1980 Summer Olympics. They later divorced.

Jährling died in Klötze, Saxony-Anhalt on 18 May 2023, at the age of 68.

== Rowing career ==
Jährling crewed the East German coxed pair boat with Friedrich-Wilhelm Ulrich and cox Georg Spohr that won the gold medal at the 1976 Montreal Olympics. For his Olympic success, he was awarded the Patriotic Order of Merit in silver (2nd class) by the state. At the 1977 World Rowing Championships in Amsterdam, the same team won a silver medal. In the following season, they were beaten by Jürgen Pfeiffer and Gert Uebeler (with cox Olaf Beyer) at national rowing regattas and thus moved across to the men's eight instead. Jährling became world champion with the eight at the 1978 World Rowing Championships in Cambridge, New Zealand.

At the 1980 Summer Olympics, he won his second gold medal with the East German boat in the coxed pairs competition. He was once more awarded the Patriotic Order of Merit in silver (2nd class) for his Olympic success.

== Coaching career ==
After his active career, Jährling worked as a rowing coach. With the German reunification, the East Germany rowing system collapsed and of some 200 coaches employed by the East German rowing association, only 28 were taken on afterward. Jährling took a job with Rowing Australia. He was criticised for selecting Sally Robbins for the women's eight at the 2004 Summer Olympics. Robbins became infamous as "Lay Down Sally" in the Australian media, after stopping rowing in the final 250 m of the Olympic final, a behavior she had displayed in at least six earlier races.

=== Coaching success ===
Jahrling's coaching medal record at World Championships consists of:

- 1994 World Rowing Championships Bronze – Australia Men's 2-
- 1995 World Rowing Championships Silver – Australia Men's 2-
- 1997 World Rowing Championships Bronze – Australia Men's 8+ and Silver – Australia M2+
- 1998 World Rowing Championships Bronze – Australia Women's 2-
