= Benter =

Benter is a German surname that may refer to

- Lutz Benter (born 1945), German Olympic rower
- Uwe Benter (born 1955), German Olympic rower, brother of Lutz
- William "Bill" Benter (born 1957), American gambler

== See also ==
- Stratton-on-the-Fosse
