= Rumen Khristov =

Bulgarian rower (born 1954)

Personal information
- Nationality: Bulgarian
- Born: 20 September 1954 (age 71)
- Height: 189 cm (6 ft 2 in)
- Weight: 85 kg (187 lb)

Sport
- Sport: Rowing
Medal record
Men's rowing
Representing Bulgaria
World Rowing Championships
Bronze medal – third place	1977 Amsterdam	Coxed four
Bronze medal – third place	1978 Karapiro	Coxed four

Rumen Khristov (Bulgarian: Румен Христов; born 20 September 1954) is a Bulgarian rower.

Khristov was born in 1954. At the 1972 World Rowing Junior Championships he came third in the B-final in the junior men's coxed pair. At the 1973 European Rowing Championships he came sixth in the men's coxed four.

Khristov competed at the 1976 Summer Olympics in the coxed pair with Tsvetan Petkov as his rowing partner and Todor Kishev as the coxswain and they came fourth. At the 1977 World Rowing Championships he won a bronze medal in the coxed four. He also came seventh in the men's eight. At the 1978 World Rowing Championships he won bronze in the coxed four and came fifth in the coxed pair.

At the 1980 Summer Olympics, he came fifth in the coxed pair.
