= Georgi Atanasov =

Georgi Atanasov may refer to:

- Georgi Atanasov (politician) (1933–2022), Bulgarian Prime Minister, 1986–1990
- Georgi Atanasov (composer) (1882–1931), Bulgarian composer
- Georgi Atanasov (rower) (born 1947), Bulgarian Olympic rower
- Georgi Atanasov (footballer) (born 2004), Canadian-born Bulgarian football player
