= Riendeau =

Riendeau is a surname. Notable people with the surname include:

- Michel Riendeau (born 1955), Canadian Olympic rowing coxswain
- Richard Riendeau (1932–2015), American football player and coach
- Vincent Riendeau (born 1966), Canadian ice hockey player
- Vincent Riendeau (diver) (born 1996), Canadian Olympic diver
- Yannick Riendeau (born 1988), Canadian ice hockey player
