= Rumen Hristov =

Rumen Hristov may refer to:

- Rumen Hristov (footballer) (born 1975), Bulgarian retired footballer
- Rumen Hristov (politician) (born 1955), Bulgarian politician

== See also ==
- Rumen Khristov (born 1954), Bulgarian rower
