= Rosabal =

Rosabal is a surname. Notable people with the surname include:

- Liliamnis Rosabal (born 1999), Cuban handball player
- Silvio Rosabal (born 1963), Cuban rowing coxswain
