= Georgi Nikolov =

Georgi Nikolov may refer to:

- Georgi Nikolov (footballer, born 1937), Bulgarian footballer
- Georgi Nikolov (footballer, born 1983), Bulgarian footballer
- Georgi Nikolov (footballer, born 2002), Bulgarian footballer
- Georgi Nikolov (rower) (born 1938), Bulgarian Olympic rower
