= Nedelcu =

Nedelcu may refer to:

- Cristina Nedelcu
- Diego Nedelcu
- Dragoș Nedelcu
- Florentina Nedelcu
- Leonida Nedelcu
- Romeo Nedelcu
- Ruxandra Nedelcu
- Nedelcu, a depopulated village in Mărașu Commune, Brăila County, Romania
