= Franco Venturini =

Franco Venturini may refer to:

- Franco Venturini (rower)
- Franco Venturini (musician)
