= Hiesinger =

Hiesinger is a surname. Notable people with the surname include:

- Bernhard Hiesinger (born 1947), German rower
- Heinrich Hiesinger (born 1960), German engineer and manager
