= Simone Venier =

Italian rower

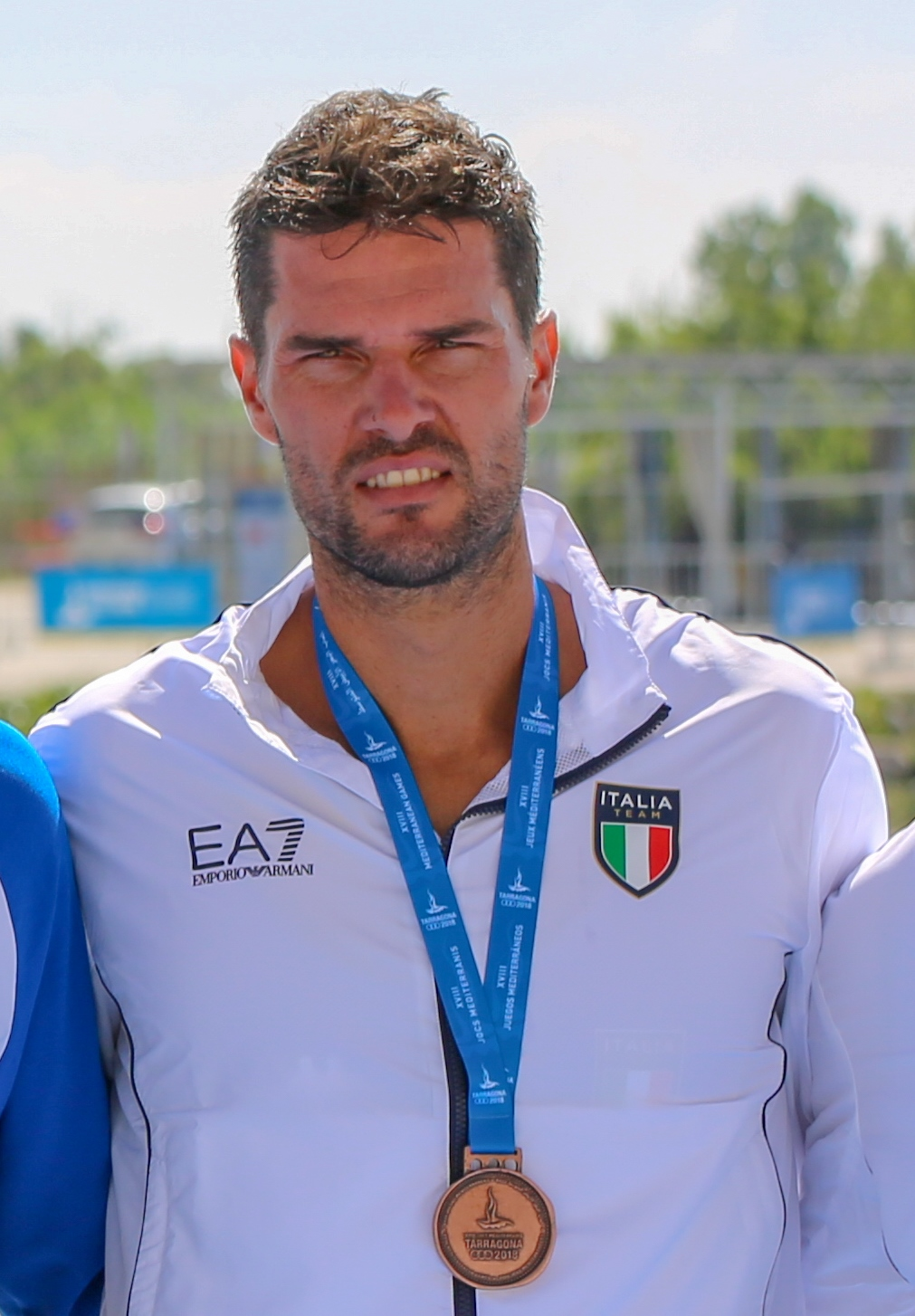

Personal information
- Born: 26 August 1984 (age 41) Latina, Italy
- Height: 196 cm (6 ft 5 in)
- Weight: 94 kg (207 lb)
- Spouse: Valeria Altobelli (m. 2013)
- Relatives: Annibale Venier (father)

Sport
- Sport: Rowing
- Club: G.S. Fiamme Gialle, Rome

Achievements and titles
- Olympic finals: Beijing 2008 M4X; Tokyo 2020 M4X
Medal record
Men's rowing
Representing Italy
Olympic Games
Silver medal – second place	2008 Beijing	Quadruple sculls
European Rowing Championships
Silver medal – second place	2007 Poznań	Quadruple sculls

Simone Venier (born 26 August 1984, in Latina) is an Italian rower - a five time Olympian. He won a silver medal in the men's quadruple sculls at the 2008 Summer Olympics. He competed at the 2020 Summer Olympics, in Quadruple sculls.

The Olympic rower Annibale Venier is his father.
