= Klaus Jäger =

German rower (born 1950)

Personal information
- Nationality: German
- Born: 6 February 1950 (age 76) Kelheim, Germany

Sport
- Sport: Rowing

Klaus Jäger (born 6 February 1950) is a German former rower. He competed in the men's coxed pair event at the 1976 Summer Olympics.
