= Yuriy Lorentsson =

Russian coxswain (1930–2002)

Personal information
- Born: 2 December 1930 Leningrad, Russian SFSR, Soviet Union
- Died: 24 December 2002 (aged 72)
- Height: 1.63 m (5 ft 4 in)
- Weight: 50 kg (110 lb)

Sport
- Sport: Rowing
- Club: Trud Leningrad
Medal record
Men's rowing
Representing the Soviet Union
Olympic Games
Silver medal – second place	1976 Montreal	Coxed pair
Bronze medal – third place	1968 Mexico City	Eight
World Rowing Championships
Silver medal – second place	1962 Lucerne	Eight
European Rowing Championships
Gold medal – first place	1967 Vichy	Coxed four
Silver medal – second place	1963 Copenhagen	Eight
Silver medal – second place	1964 Amsterdam	Eight
Bronze medal – third place	1973 Moscow	Eight

Yuriy Evgenevich Lorentsson (Russian: Юрий Евгеньевич Лоренцсон, 2 December 1930 – 24 December 2002) was a Russian rowing coxswain. He was the second rower, after Briton Jack Beresford, to compete at five Olympics. In 1960 he was the coxswain of the Soviet boat which was eliminated in the repechage of the eight event. Four years later he finished fifth with the Soviet boat in the eight competition. At the 1968 Games in Mexico City he won the bronze medal as cox of the Soviet boat in the eights event. In 1972 he coxed the Soviet boat which finished fifth in the coxed pair competition. His last Olympic appearance was in Montreal at the 1976 Olympics when he won the silver medal as part of the Soviet boat in the coxed pairs event.

Lorentsson began with long-distance running and only in 1958 started training in rowing, following his elder brother Valentin who already competed as a coxswain. His career lasted until 1979, when he won a bronze medal at national championships. During this period, besides his Olympic achievements, Lorentsson won a silver at the 1962 World Rowing Championships and four European medals.

== See also ==
- List of athletes with the most appearances at Olympic Games
