= Rolf Hartung =

German rower

Personal information
- Born: 20 July 1947 (age 78) Hanau, Germany
- Height: 195 cm (6 ft 5 in)
- Weight: 98 kg (216 lb)

Sport
- Sport: Rowing
Medal record
Men's rowing
Representing West Germany
European Rowing Championships
Bronze medal – third place	1969 Klagenfurt	Eight

Rolf Hartung (born 20 July 1947) is a German rower who represented West Germany.

He competed at the 1968 Summer Olympics in Mexico City with the men's coxed pair where they came sixth. At the 1969 European Rowing Championships in Klagenfurt, he won bronze with the men's eight.
