= Beat Wirz =

Swiss rower

Personal information
- Nationality: Swiss
- Born: 30 January 1953; Grossdietwil, Switzerland
- Died: 31 December 2020 (aged 67)

Sport
- Sport: Rowing

Beat Wirz (30 January 1953 – 31 December 2020) was a Swiss rower. He competed in the men's coxed pair event at the 1968 Summer Olympics.
