= Robert Bergen =

Canadian rower

Personal information
- Nationality: Canadian
- Born: 26 February 1950 (age 75); Vancouver, British Columbia, Canada

Sport
- Sport: Rowing

Robert Bergen (born 26 February 1950) is a Canadian rower. He competed in the men's coxed pair event at the 1976 Summer Olympics.
