= Siniša Rutešić =

Croatian rowing coxswain

Personal information
- Nationality: Croatian
- Born: 17 October 1960 (age 64); Šibenik, Yugoslavia

Sport
- Sport: Rowing

Siniša Rutešić (born 17 October 1960) is a Croatian rowing coxswain. He competed in the men's coxed pair event at the 1976 Summer Olympics.
