= Bruno Cipolla =

Italian rower (1952–2026)

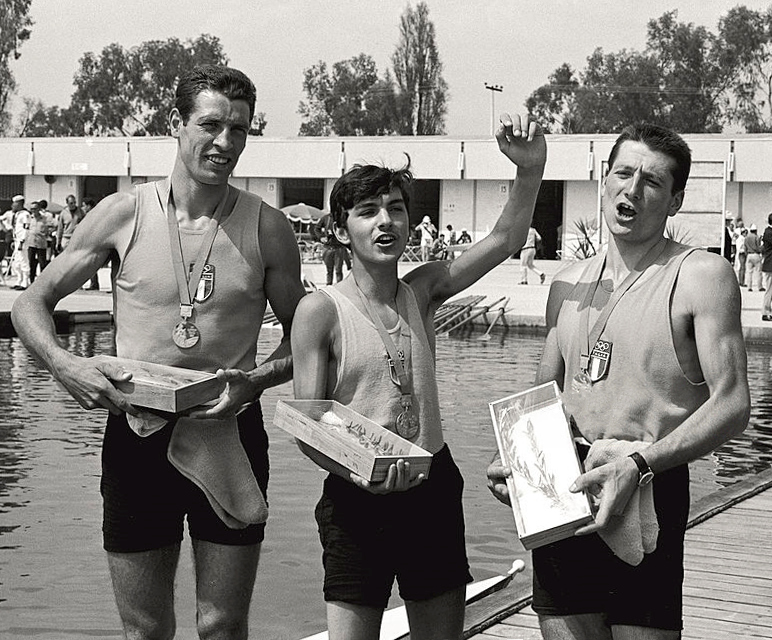
- Renzo Sambo, Bruno Cipolla and Primo Baran at the 1968 Olympics

Personal information
- Born: 24 December 1952 Cuneo, Italy
- Died: 15 February 2026 (aged 73) Oderzo, Italy
- Height: 1.65 m (5 ft 5 in)
- Weight: 50 kg (110 lb)

Sport
- Sport: Rowing
Medal record
Men's rowing
Representing Italy
Olympic Games
Gold medal – first place	1968 Mexico City	Coxed pair
European Championships
Gold medal – first place	1967 Vichy	Coxed pair

Bruno Cipolla (24 December 1952 – 15 February 2026) was an Italian rowing coxswain who had his best achievements in the coxed pairs, together with Renzo Sambo and Primo Baran. They won a European title in 1967 and an Olympic gold medal in 1968, for which Cipolla received a car from the Fiat company. His career was interrupted for six months by a motorcycle collision after the Olympics. He retired in 1971.

Cipolla died on 15 February 2026, at the age of 73.
