= Ken Dreyfuss =

American coxswain (born 1947)

- Coxed pair of Vesper Rowing Club (from left: Vreugdenhil, Mathews, Dreyfus) at the 1976 Lucerne International Regatta. The same crew competed at Montreal that same year.

Personal information
- National team: United States of America
- Born: October 8, 1947 (age 78) Washington, D.C., United States
- Education: University of Pennsylvania

Sport
- Sport: Rowing
- Club: Vesper Rowing Club, Potomac Boat Club, Annapolis Junior Rowing Association

Ken Dreyfuss (born October 8, 1947) is an American coxswain. He captained and coxed the 1969 Penn heavyweight crew that broke Harvard's six year winning streak and went on to win three consecutive team championships at the Intercollegiate Rowing Association National Championships. He competed in the men's coxed pair event at the 1975 World Rowing Championships, the 1975 Pan-American Games (in which he won a gold medal), and the 1976 Summer Olympics.

== Coaching career ==
Dreyfuss has coached at Chestnut Hill Academy, The United States Naval Academy (Plebe Heavyweights), Stanford University (Varsity Men), Potomac Boat Club, Georgetown University (Lightweight Men), Montgomery Boat Club, and currently at Annapolis Junior Rowing Association.

Dreyfuss' Chestnut Hill crew won both Philadelphia City Championships and the Stotesbury Cup. His Plebe Heavyweight crew at Navy won the 1982 Eastern Sprints. During his tenure, the Navy Heavyweight Men won the event overall in 1982, 1983, and 1984. While at Stanford University, Dreyfuss was named 1986 PAC 10 Coach of The Year. The Stanford Varsity Men defeated rivals University of California six times and the University of Washington three times. This ended a seventeen year drought against both institutions. In 1993, Dreyfuss founded the Elite Sculling program at Potomac Boat Club, which has produced more athletes invited to the United States National Team than any other program. Ken Dreyfuss currently serves as Head Coach of Annapolis Junior Rowing Association.

== Halls of fame ==
In 2017, Dreyfuss was inducted into the Philadelphia Jewish Sports Hall of Fame.
