= Roderick Rijnders =

Dutch rower (1941–2018)

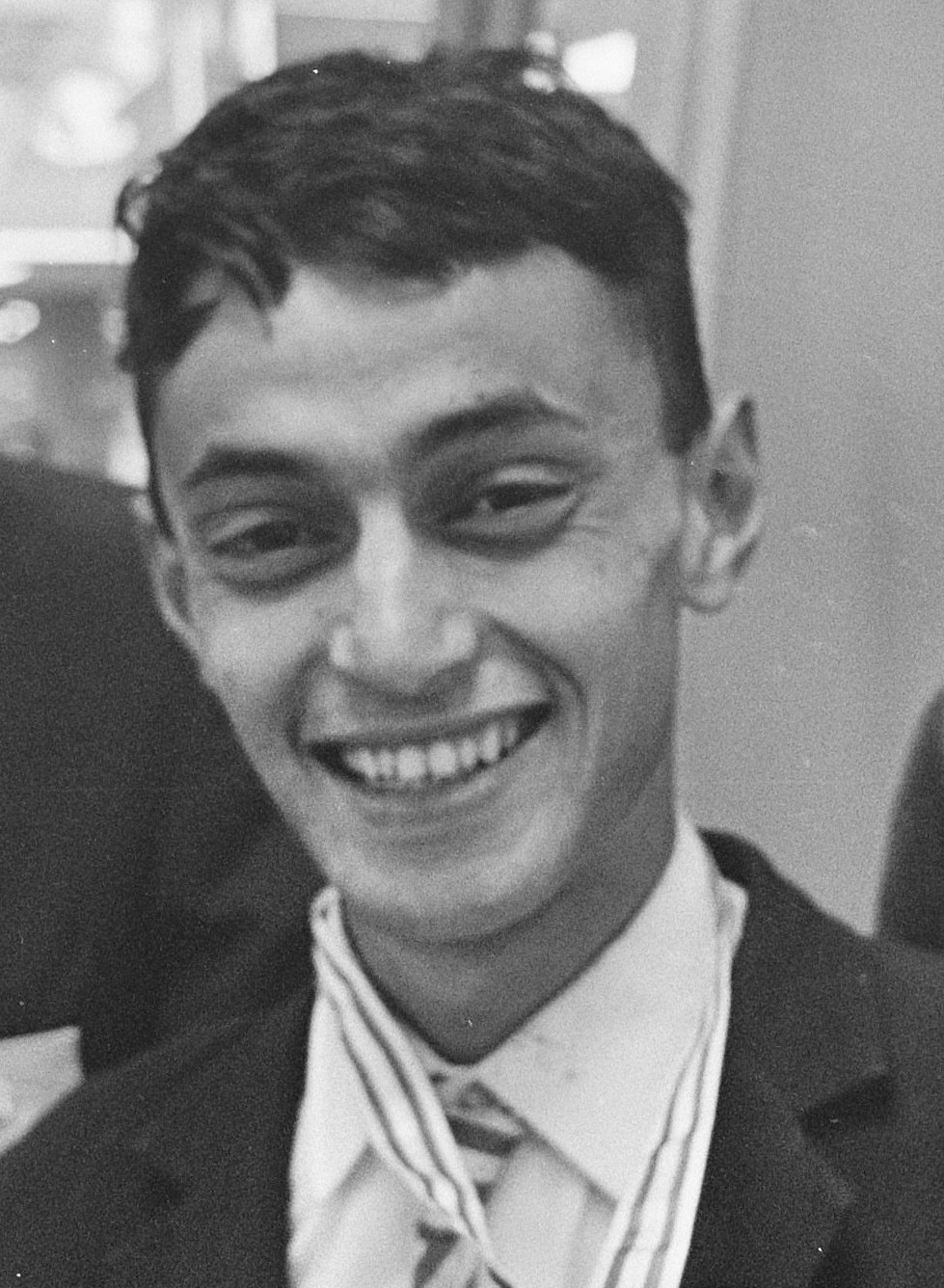
- Roderick Rijnders in 1967

Personal information
- Born: 1 March 1941 Batavia, Dutch East Indies
- Died: 15 January 2018 (aged 76)
- Height: 1.72 m (5 ft 8 in)
- Weight: 54 kg (119 lb)

Sport
- Sport: Rowing
- Club: Laga, Delft
Medal record
Men's rowing
Representing the Netherlands
Olympic Games
Silver medal – second place	1968 Mexico City	Coxed pair
European Rowing Championships
Bronze medal – third place	1965 Duisburg	Coxed pair

Roderick "Rody" Falesca Renee Trygvae Rijnders (1 March 1941 – 15 January 2018) was a coxswain from the Netherlands. He won the silver medal in the coxed pairs at the 1968 Summer Olympics, alongside Hadriaan van Nes and Herman Suselbeek, as well a European bronze in 1965.
