= Zlatko Celent =

Croatian rower (1952–1992)

Olympic medal record

Men's rowing
Bronze medal – third place	1980 Moscow	Coxed pair

Zlatko Celent (20 July 1952 in Split – 25 February 1992 in Pag) was a Croat rower. He was part of the team which won a bronze in coxed pair in the 1980 Summer Olympics in Moscow.
