= Urs Bitterli =

Swiss rower

Personal information
- Nationality: Swiss
- Born: 19 May 1944 (age 82) Wisen, Switzerland

Sport
- Sport: Rowing

Urs Bitterli (born 19 May 1944, died on June 11 in Stans, Switzerland) was a Swiss rower. He competed in the men's coxed pair event at the 1968 Summer Olympics.
