= Rostislav Peterka =

Argentine rower

Personal information
- Nationality: Argentine
- Born: 1 March 1949 (age 76)

Sport
- Sport: Rowing

Rostislav Peterka (born 1 March 1949) is an Argentine rower. He competed in the men's coxed pair event at the 1968 Summer Olympics.
