= Lauro Pacussich =

Peruvian rower

Personal information
- Born: 16 August 1940 (age 84); Lima, Peru

Sport
- Sport: Rowing

Lauro Pacussich (born 16 August 1940) is a Peruvian rower. He competed in the men's coxed pair event at the 1968 Summer Olympics.
