= Luis Colman =

Uruguayan rower (1954–2014)

Personal information
- Born: 22 June 1954; Montevideo, Uruguay
- Died: 13 September 2014 (aged 60)

Sport
- Sport: Rowing

Luis Colman (22 June 1954 – 13 September 2014) was a Uruguayan rower. He competed in the men's coxed pair event at the 1968 Summer Olympics.
