= Helmut Wollmann =

German rower

Personal information
- Born: 16 March 1947 (age 78); Berlin, Germany
- Height: 197 cm (6 ft 6 in)
- Weight: 83 kg (183 lb)

Sport
- Sport: Rowing

Helmut Wollmann (born 16 March 1947) is a German rower who represented East Germany. He competed at the 1968 Summer Olympics in Mexico City with the men's coxed pair where they came fourth.
