= Darrell Vreugdenhil =

American rower (born 1949)

Personal information
- Born: April 23, 1949 (age 77) Mitchell, South Dakota, United States

Sport
- Sport: Rowing

Darrell Vreugdenhil (born April 23, 1949) is an American rower. He competed in the men's coxed pair event at the 1976 Summer Olympics.
