= Dmitry Bekhterev =

Russian rower

Medal record

Men's rowing

Representing the Soviet Union

Olympic Games
Silver medal – second place	1976 Montreal	Coxed pair

Dmitri Nikolaevich Bekhterev (Russian: Дмитрий Николаевич Бехтерев, born 4 November 1949 in Tver) is a Russian rower who competed for the Soviet Union in the 1976 Summer Olympics.

In 1976 he was a crew member of the Soviet boat which won the silver medal in the coxed pairs event.
