= Antoine Gambert =

French rower

Personal information
- Nationality: French
- Born: 7 January 1959 (age 66)

Sport
- Sport: Rowing

Antoine Gambert (born 7 January 1959) is a French rowing coxswain. He competed in the men's coxed pair event at the 1976 Summer Olympics.
