= Ángel Urrutia =

Spanish rower

Personal information
- Nationality: Spanish
- Born: 9 January 1945 (age 80)

Sport
- Sport: Rowing

Ángel Urrutia (born 9 January 1945) is a Spanish rower. He competed in the men's coxed pair event at the 1968 Summer Olympics.
