= Filiberto Marco =

Spanish rower

Personal information
- Nationality: Spanish
- Born: 21 August 1951 (age 73)

Sport
- Sport: Rowing

Filiberto Marco (born 21 August 1951) is a Spanish rower. He competed in the men's coxed pair event at the 1968 Summer Olympics.
