= Yuriy Shurkalov =

Soviet rower (born 1949)

Yuri Shurkalov
Personal information
- Born: 18 September 1949 Rostov-on-Don, Russian SFSR, Soviet Union

Sport
- Sport: Rowing
- Club: Spartak Novgorod
Medal record
Representing the Soviet Union
Olympic Games
Silver medal – second place	1976 Montreal	Coxed pair

Yuri Stepanovich Shurkalov (Russian: Юрий Степанович Шуркалов, born 18 September 1949) is a Russian rower who competed for the Soviet Union in the 1976 Summer Olympics.

In 1976 he was a crew member of the Soviet boat which won the silver medal in the coxed pairs event.
