= Însurăței =

- Town
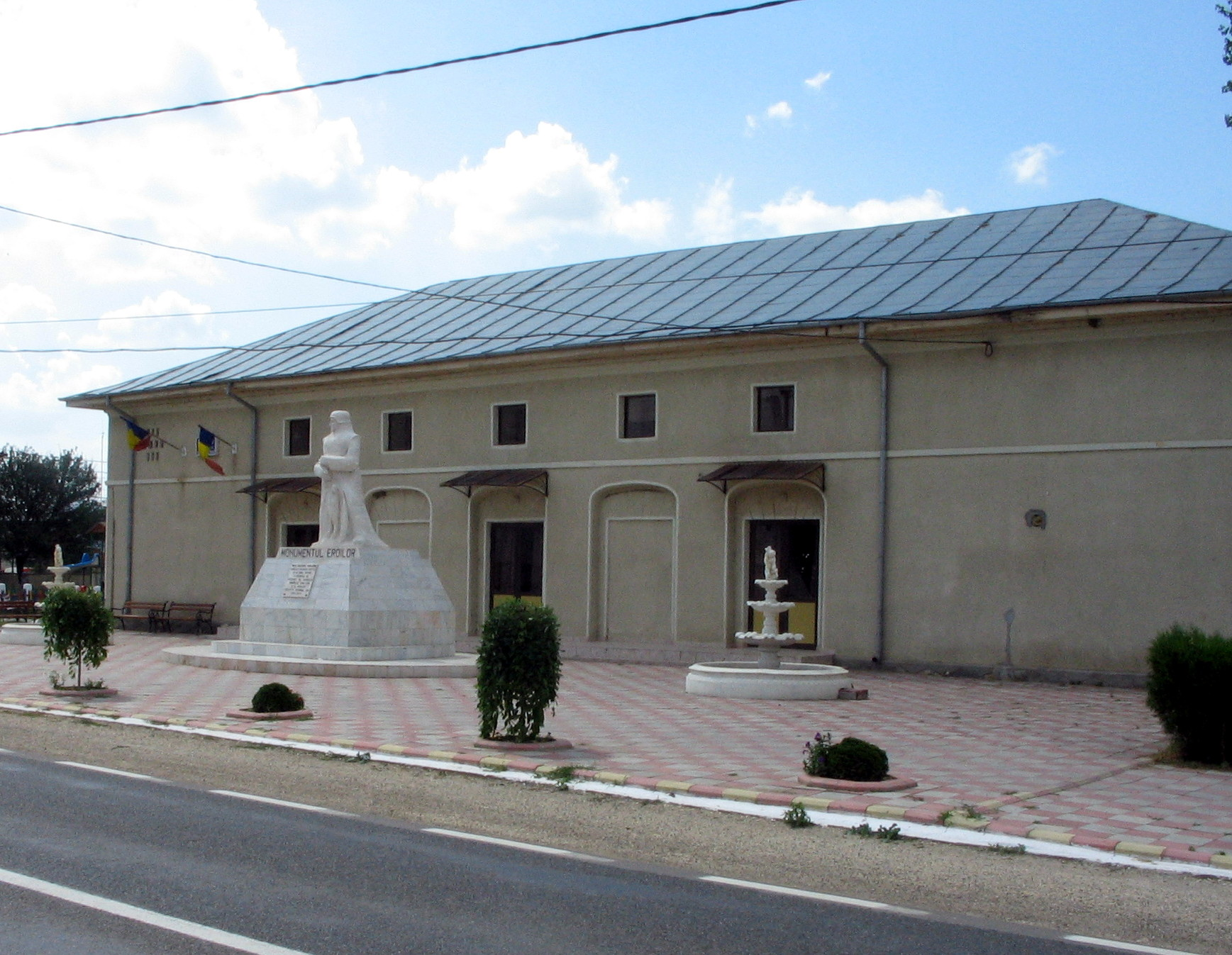
- Însurăței town hall

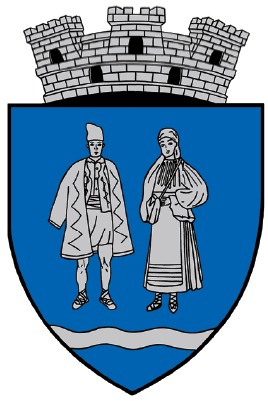
- Flag Coat of arms

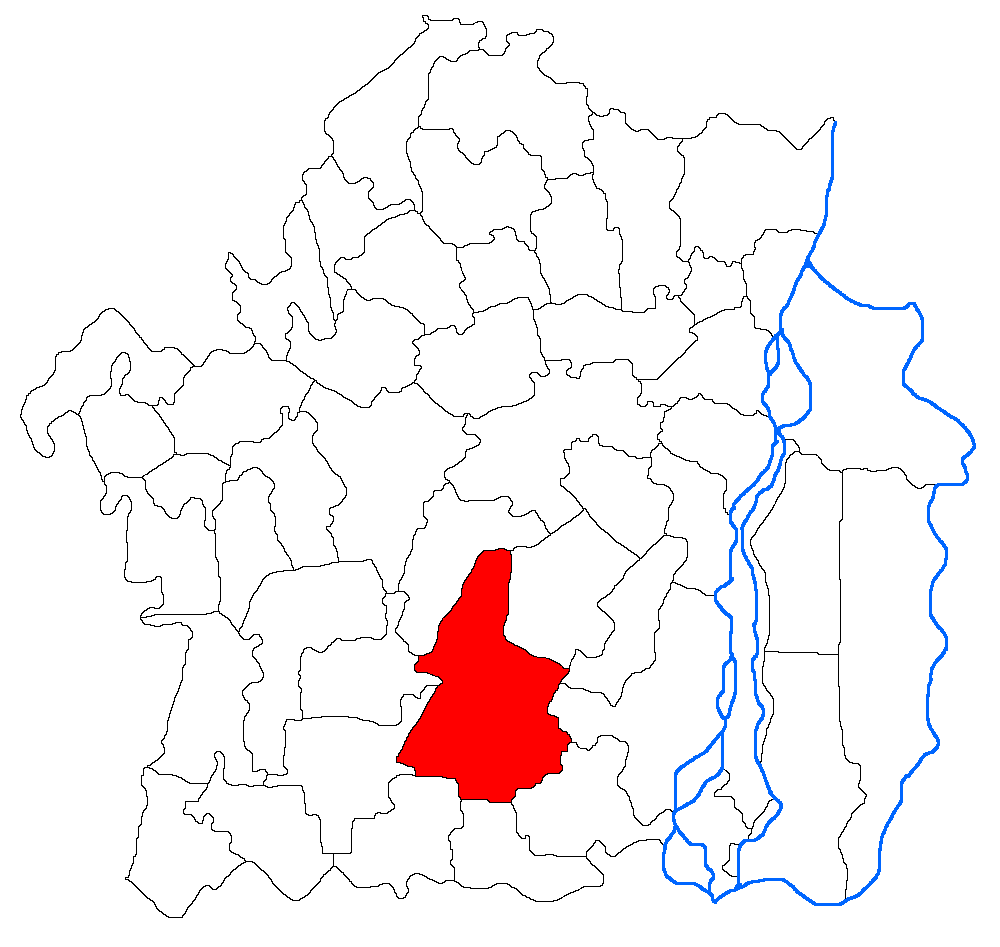
- Location in Brăila County

- Location in Romania
- Coordinates: 44°55′07″N 27°36′38″E
- Country: Romania
- County: Brăila

Government
  - Mayor (2024–2028): Florentina Carșote (PSD)
- Area: 213.03 km^{2} (82.25 sq mi)
- Elevation: 30 m (98 ft)
- Population (2021-12-01): 5,870
  - Density: 27.6/km^{2} (71.4/sq mi)
- Time zone: UTC+02:00 (EET)
  - Summer (DST): UTC+03:00 (EEST)
- Postal code: 815300
- Area code: (+40) 02 39
- Vehicle reg.: BR
- Website: www.primariaorasinsuratei.ro

Însurăței (formerly known as Pârdăleni) is a town located in Brăila County, Muntenia, Romania. The town administers three villages: Lacu Rezii, Măru Roșu, and Valea Călmățuiului. The latter was called Rubla during Communist rule and housed political offenders who were obliged to live there. It officially became a town in 1989, as a result of the Romanian rural systematization program.

Historical population
Year	Pop.	±%
1992	7,396	—
2002	7,501	+1.4%
2011	6,528	−13.0%
2021	5,870	−10.1%
Source: Census data

The town lies in the Bărăgan Plain, a steppe plain in the eastern part of the Wallachian Plain. Însurăței is located in the southern part of the county, 50 km (31 mi) from the county seat, Brăila. It is crossed by national road DN21, linking the Danube port of Brăila with Călărași.

In 1956, Corneliu Coposu was sentenced to life imprisonment for "betrayal of the working class" and "crime against social reforms"; he was freed after 15 years of detention and 2 years of forced residence in Rubla. Coposu later testified having been impressed by the deep scars collectivization had left in the country, as well as by the resilience of the Rubla deportees (see Bărăgan deportations) — "They traded in vegetables they had grown themselves while locals could not be convinced that these could actually grow on the Bărăgan".

== Natives ==
- Miroslav Giuchici (b. 1954), footballer
- Gheorghe Moldoveanu (b. 1945), rower
