= Mario Tabio =

Cuban rower (born 1942)

Personal information
- Full name: Mario Tabio Teheran
- Born: 7 June 1942 (age 84) Havana, Cuba

Sport
- Sport: Rowing
Medal record
Men's rowing
Representing Cuba
Pan American Games
Bronze medal – third place	1967 Winnipeg	Coxed four
Bronze medal – third place	1967 Winnipeg	Eight

Mario Tabio Teheran (born 7 June 1942) is a Cuban rower. He competed at the 1964 and the 1968 Summer Olympics.
