= Veselin Staevski =

Bulgarian rower

Personal information
- Nationality: Bulgarian
- Born: 21 January 1941 (age 84); Troyan, Bulgaria

Sport
- Sport: Rowing

Veselin Staevski (Bulgarian: Веселин Стаевски; born 21 January 1941) is a Bulgarian rower. He competed in the men's coxed pair event at the 1968 Summer Olympics.
