= Holger Hocke =

German rower (born 1945)

Personal information
- Nationality: German
- Born: 8 March 1945 (age 81) Hamburg, Germany

Sport
- Sport: Rowing

Holger Hocke (born 8 March 1945) is a German rowing coxswain. He competed in the men's coxed pair event at the 1976 Summer Olympics.
