= Juan López (rowing) =

Peruvian coxswain (born 1934)

Personal information
- Born: 16 October 1934 (age 90); Lima, Peru

Sport
- Sport: Rowing

Juan López (born 16 October 1934) is a Peruvian coxswain. He competed in the men's coxed pair event at the 1968 Summer Olympics.
