= Thomas Hitzbleck =

German rower (born 1947)

Personal information
- Born: 12 March 1947 (age 79) Wilhelmshaven, Germany
- Height: 196 cm (6 ft 5 in)
- Weight: 95 kg (209 lb)

Sport
- Sport: Rowing
Medal record
Men's rowing
Representing West Germany
World Rowing Championships
Bronze medal – third place	1975 Nottingham	Coxed pair
European Rowing Championships
Bronze medal – third place	1969 Klagenfurt	Eight

Thomas Hitzbleck (born 12 March 1947) is a German rower who represented West Germany. He competed at the 1968 Summer Olympics in Mexico City with the men's coxless four, where they came sixth. Hitzbleck competed at the 1976 Summer Olympics in Montreal with the men's coxed pair, where they came eighth.
