= Richard Lippi =

French rower

Personal information
- Full name: Richard Ciro Aurelien Lippi
- Nationality: French
- Born: 21 October 1948; Drap, France
- Died: 6 December 1988 (aged 40); Chevry, Ain, France

Sport
- Sport: Rowing

Richard Ciro Aurelien Lippi (21 October 1948 – 6 December 1988) was a French rower. He competed in the men's coxed pair event at the 1968 Summer Olympics.
