= Renzo Sambo =

Italian rower

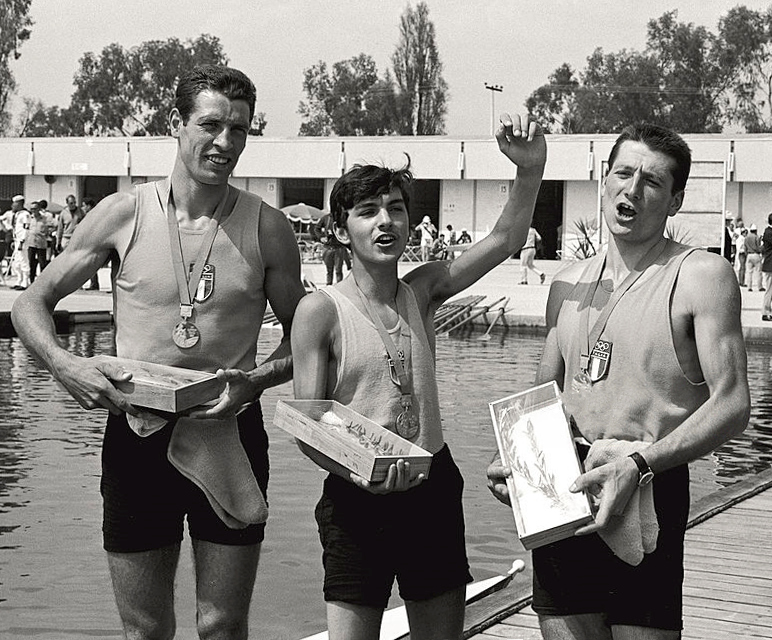
- Renzo Sambo (left), Bruno Cipolla and Primo Baran at the 1968 Olympics

Personal information
- Born: 17 January 1942 Treviso, Italy
- Died: 10 August 2009 (aged 67) Cesiomaggiore, Belluno, Italy
- Height: 1.90 m (6 ft 3 in)
- Weight: 90 kg (198 lb)

Sport
- Sport: Rowing
Medal record
Men's rowing
Representing Italy
Olympic Games
Gold medal – first place	1968 Mexico City	Coxed pair
World Championships
Bronze medal – third place	1966 Bled	Coxed pair
European Rowing Championships
Gold medal – first place	1967 Vichy	Coxed pair
Silver medal – second place	1965 Duisburg	Coxed pair

Renzo Sambo (17 January 1942 – 10 August 2009) was an Italian rower who had his best achievements in the coxed pairs, together with Primo Baran and coxswain Bruno Cipolla. They won a European title in 1967 and an Olympic gold in 1968.

Sambo then changed to the coxed fours, but with less success. During his career he won 15 national titles in various events. In retirement he worked as a coach with Circolo Ospedalieri Treviso, which organizes the Renzo Sambo Memorial Regatta since 2009.
