= Juan Sáinz =

Mexican rower (born 1945)

Personal information
- Born: 20 August 1945 (age 79); Mexico City, Mexico

Sport
- Sport: Rowing

Juan Sáinz (born 20 August 1945) is a Mexican rower. He competed in the men's coxed pair event at the 1968 Summer Olympics.
