= Denis Rice =

Irish rower

Personal information
- Nationality: Irish
- Born: 8 February 1958 (age 67)

Sport
- Sport: Rowing

Denis Rice (born 8 February 1958) is an Irish rower. He competed in the men's coxed pair event at the 1980 Summer Olympics.
