= Harry Jørgensen =

Danish rower (born 1945)

Olympic medal record

Men's rowing
Bronze medal – third place	1968 Mexico City	Coxed pair

Harry Jørgensen (born 7 December 1945 in Gammel Haderslev, Region of Southern Denmark) is a Danish rower who competed in the 1968 Summer Olympics.

He represented Haderslev Roklub.

In 1968 he was a crew member of the Danish boat which won the bronze medal in the coxed pairs event.
