= Joseph Szostak =

French rower

Personal information
- Nationality: French
- Born: 13 August 1943 (age 81); Vernay, France

Sport
- Sport: Rowing

Joseph Szostak (born 13 August 1943) is a French rower. He competed in the men's coxed pair event at the 1968 Summer Olympics.
