= Danilo Mora =

Cuban rower

Personal information
- Nationality: Cuban
- Born: 21 February 1961 (age 64)

Sport
- Sport: Rowing

Danilo Mora (born 21 February 1961) is a Cuban rower. He competed in the men's coxed pair event at the 1980 Summer Olympics.
