= Josip Reić =

Yugoslav rower

Olympic medal record

Men's rowing
| Bronze medal – third place | 1980 Moscow | Coxed pair |

Josip Reić (born 24 July 1965) is a Yugoslav rower. He was part of the team which won a bronze in Coxed pairs in the 1980 Summer Olympics in Moscow.
