= Jürgen Pfeiffer =

East German rower

Sport
- Sport: Rowing
- Club: SC Chemie Halle
Medal record
Men's rowing
Representing East Germany
World Rowing Championships
Gold medal – first place	1978 Karapiro	Coxed pair
Gold medal – first place	1979 Bled	Coxed pair

Jürgen Pfeiffer is a German rower who competed for East Germany.

Pfeiffer grew up near Gera. He was twice world champion alongside Gert Uebeler in coxed pair. At the 1978 World Rowing Championships at Lake Karapiro, New Zealand, they became world champions with Olaf Beyer as coxswain. They defended their title at the 1979 World Rowing Championships in Bled, Yugoslavia, with Georg Spohr as coxswain.
