= Gert Uebeler =

East German rower

Personal information
- Born: 15 March 1957 (age 69)
- Height: 189 cm (6 ft 2 in)
- Weight: 95 kg (209 lb)

Sport
- Sport: Rowing
- Club: SC Dynamo Berlin
Medal record
Men's rowing
Representing East Germany
World Rowing Championships
| Gold medal – first place | 1978 Karapiro | Coxed pair |
| Gold medal – first place | 1979 Bled | Coxed pair |
| Silver medal – second place | 1982 Lucerne | Eight |
| Silver medal – second place | 1983 Dusiburg | Eight |

Gert Uebeler (born 15 March 1957) is a German rower who competed for East Germany.

Uebeler was born in 1957 and grew up in Dessau. He was junior men's coxed pair world champion in 1974. He was twice world champion alongside Jürgen Pfeiffer in coxed pair. At the 1978 World Rowing Championships at Lake Karapiro, New Zealand, they became world champions with Olaf Beyer as coxswain. They defended their title at the 1979 World Rowing Championships in Bled, Yugoslavia, with Georg Spohr as coxswain.
