= José Luis Álvarez (rower) =

Mexican rower (born 1943)

Personal information
- Born: 9 May 1943 (age 81); Mexico City, Mexico

Sport
- Sport: Rowing

José Luis Álvarez (born 9 May 1943) is a Mexican rower. He competed in the men's coxed pair event at the 1968 Summer Olympics.
