= Atalibio Magioni =

Brazilian rower

Personal information
- Nationality: Brazilian
- Born: 25 January 1947 (age 79)

Sport
- Sport: Rowing

Atalibio Magioni (born 25 January 1947) is a Brazilian rower. He competed in the men's coxed pair event at the 1976 Summer Olympics.
