= Miguel Solano =

Spanish rower

Personal information
- Nationality: Spanish
- Born: 29 October 1946 (age 78)

Sport
- Sport: Rowing

Miguel Solano (born 29 October 1946) is a Spanish rower. He competed in the men's coxed pair event at the 1968 Summer Olympics.
