= Gennadi Kryuçkin =

Azerbaijani rower (born 1958)

Olympic medal record

Men's rowing

Representing the Soviet Union
Silver medal – second place	1980 Moscow	Coxed pair

Friendship Games
Gold medal – first place	1984 Moscow	Coxless four

Gennadi Vladimiroviç Kryuçkin (former Azerbaijani: Геннадий Владимирович Крючкин; born 22 October 1958) is an Azerbaijani former rower who competed for the Soviet Union in the 1980 Summer Olympics and for the Unified Team in the 1992 Summer Olympics.

In 1980 he was a crew member of the Soviet boat which won the silver medal in the coxed pairs event.

Twelve years later he finished sixth with the Unified Team boat in the 1992 coxed fours competition.
