= Viktor Pereverzev =

Azerbaijani former rower (born 1958)

Olympic medal record

Men's rowing

Representing the Soviet Union

Olympic Games
Silver medal – second place	1980 Moscow	Coxed pair

Friendship Games
Gold medal – first place	1984 Moscow	Coxless four

Viktor Mikhayloviç Pereverzev (former Azerbaijani: Виктор Михайлович Переверзев, born 17 June 1958 in Topchikha, Altai Krai) is an Azerbaijani former rower who competed for the Soviet Union in the 1980 Summer Olympics.

He was born in Altai Krai, Russian SFSR.

In 1980 he was a crew member of the Soviet boat which won the silver medal in the coxed pairs event.
