= Virgil Caraivan =

Romanian writer (1879–1966)

Virgil Caraivan (February 12, 1879 – 1966) was a Romanian prose writer.

Born in Șuletea, Vaslui County, his parents were the schoolteacher Neculai Caraivan and his wife Smaranda. He went to primary school in his native village, followed by gymnasium in nearby Bârlad and high school in Piatra Neamț, which he completed in 1900. In 1903, he graduated from the literature and law faculty of the University of Bucharest. His first published work appeared in Noua revistă română in 1901 and consisted of the study "Ritmul muncii în poeziile populare". His first book was the 1901 collection of stories and anecdotes La șezătoare, followed by Povești (1908), Doamna Ilina (1909), Movila roșie (1913) and La gura sobei (1924). He edited Tribuna newspaper in 1903 and the magazines Răzeșul (1926) and Documente răzășești (1932). Publications that ran his work include Luceafărul, Sămănătorul, Floarea darurilor and Ion Creangă. A founding member of the Romanian Writers' Society, he served as cashier from 1908. After 1933 he withdrew to the countryside and worked as a farmer. His literary activity was varied, including translations from Nikolai Gogol and from world folklore (Povești de pretutindeni, 1908; Povești franceze, 1909; Povești corsicane, 1910), and the difficult-to-classify collection Basme și legende streine.

He died in Bucharest in 1966.
