= Gheorghe Moldoveanu (rower) =

Romanian rower

Personal information
- Nationality: Romanian
- Born: 15 December 1945 (age 79); Însurăței, Romania

Sport
- Sport: Rowing

Gheorghe Moldoveanu (born 15 December 1945) is a Romanian rower. He competed in the men's coxed pair event at the 1968 Summer Olympics.
