= Karel Kovář (rower) =

Czech rower

Personal information
- Nationality: Czech
- Born: 10 December 1942 (age 82); Třebíč, Protectorate of Bohemia and Moravia

Sport
- Sport: Rowing

Karel Kovář (born 10 December 1942) is a Czech rower. He competed in the men's coxed pair event at the 1968 Summer Olympics.
