= Gabriel Bularda =

Romanian rower

Personal information
- Nationality: Romanian
- Born: 26 June 1954 (age 70); Șuletea, Romania

Sport
- Sport: Rowing

Gabriel Bularda (born 26 June 1954) is a Romanian rower. He competed in the men's coxed pair event at the 1980 Summer Olympics.
