= Walter Krawec =

Canadian rower

Personal information
- Nationality: Canadian
- Born: 9 June 1951 (age 73)

Sport
- Sport: Rowing

Walter Krawec (born 9 June 1951) is a Canadian rower. He competed in the men's coxed pair event at the Montreal 1976 Summer Olympics positioning him at number 13.
