= Preben Krab =

Danish rower (born 1952)

Olympic medal record

Men's rowing
Bronze medal – third place	1968 Mexico City	Coxed pair

Preben Krab (born 15 July 1952) is a Danish rower who competed in the 1968 Summer Olympics.

He was born in Gammel Haderslev, Region of Southern Denmark and is the younger brother of Jørn Krab.

In 1968 he was the coxswain of the Danish boat which won the bronze medal in the coxed pairs event.
