= Stanko Miloš =

Croatian rower

Personal information
- Nationality: Croatian
- Born: 5 December 1952 (age 72); Praputnjak, Yugoslavia

Sport
- Sport: Rowing

Stanko Miloš (born 5 December 1952) is a Croatian rower. He competed in the men's coxed pair event at the 1976 Summer Olympics.
