= Carlos Otero (rowing) =

Argentine rower

Personal information
- Born: 16 October 1944 (age 80); Buenos Aires, Argentina

Sport
- Sport: Rowing

Carlos Otero (born 16 October 1944) is an Argentine rower. He competed in the men's coxed pair event at the 1968 Summer Olympics.
