= Duško Mrduljaš =

Medal record

Representing Yugoslavia

Men's rowing

Olympic Games
Bronze medal – third place	1980 Moscow	Coxed pair

World Rowing Junior Championships
Bronze medal – third place	1972 Milan	Coxless pair

Duško Mrduljaš (born 17 July 1951) is a former professional rower who won a bronze medal in the coxed pair at the 1980 Summer Olympics. He is also a businessman with philanthropic interests. He was born on 17 July 1951 in Split, Croatia. He finished high school in 1972 in Split and in 1979 graduated from the Faculty of Economics also in Split. He is married and has two children.

== Business career and charity work ==
Working career began in the commercial enterprise "Dalma" in 1979 in Split on business planning and analysis. From 1983 to 1985 he was director of housing co-operative "Dalma", from 1985 to 1993, he was head of the commercial sector in the wholesale company "Dalma" and Croatian representative in the federal committee for trade promotion in Yugoslavia (1980–1984). He participated as a volunteer in Croatia War of Independence in 1991. After the war, he was active in veterans associations where he was president of the Association of Volunteers of the Croatian Navy and member of the Republican coordination associations came from the war on the state level. From 1993 to 1995 he performed the duties of building management for the UN. From 1996 to 1997 he was director of the "SS - Split". In 1996 he entered the entrepreneur and founded his own company ABA VELA d.o.o. in nautical tourism, which is being successful till nowadays. In between 2001 and 2002 he was the CEO of the biggest Croatian nautical company ACI from Opatija and was a member of the working group of the Government Office for the development of the strategy of tourism of the Republic of Croatia (2002 - 2003).

== Family ==
His grandfather was a state representative in rowing, father and uncle champions of Europe in eights (1932) and the son Jure Mrduljaš of silver in the overall World Cup in coxless four. His mother was a national champion in swimming, his wife Vinka Mrduljas is multiple state champion in rowing, and brothers state champions in sailing.

== Sport ==
Duško Mrduljaš participated in three Olympics (1972, 1976, 1980) and he is the winner of numerous international regattas. He won the Olympic bronze medal in coxed pair at the 1980 Summer Olympics in Moscow in 1980. He also won the bronze medal in the coxless pair at the World Junior Championships in Naples in 1969. He was the winner at the Mediterranean Games in Split in 1979. He won the gold medal at the Balkans championships for 7 times and national champion medal for 18 times.

He won the gold medal in swimming at the military state championship. He competed and won in numerous sailing regattas in the class cruiser. As a long-time and experienced yachtsman he is representative of the Royal Nautical Club of London in Croatia. In addition to membership in the Croatian rowing club "Gusar" he is the member of the sailing club "Labud", and has long been a member of the ski club "Split", Mountaineering Society "Mosor", the diving club "Split" and chess club "Mornar". Duško Mrduljaš held numerous positions in various sporting bodies. He was the president of the Croatian Rowing Club HVK Gusar from Split (1984–1985), the president of the Sailing Club "Adriatic" in Opatija, a former Republican delegate for sports (1980–1984), a member of "SIZ" and Sports of the city of Split, rowing judge of Croatian Rowing Club since 1973 and an international rowing FISA judge.

He made contributions in Croatian Olympic Committee (2000 - ) as a delegate of Croatian Rowing association through three mandatory periods. As a member of the Assembly in the same period he was elected three times to the Council of the Croatian Olympic Committee (2000–2002; 2004–2008) . Through participation in the work of the COC he has made a significant contribution to the work of the sports organisations in Croatia, development of Croatian sport and realisation of a number of high-level sports achievements, among which is the rowing and the club HVK Gusar. As a Member of the Working Group Office of the Government for development of the Sports in 2007 he appointed the first commission for professional sports clubs that in his four-year term did an important role in the process of transformation of sports clubs in Croatia. With his work in the Committee for Professional Sports Clubs Duško Mrduljaš gave an important contribution to the successful realisation of this pioneering work.
