= Ludvík Vébr =

Czech rower (born 1960)

Olympic medal record

Men's rowing
Bronze medal – third place	1976 Montreal	Coxed pair

Ludvík Vébr (born 20 April 1960) is a Czech rower who competed for Czechoslovakia in the 1972 Summer Olympics and in the 1976 Summer Olympics. Ludvík Vébr is also associate professor (docent) at Czech Technical University in Prague. He is expert in the road engineering.

He was born in Prague.

In 1976 he was the coxswain of the Czechoslovak boat which won the bronze medal in the coxed pairs event.
