= Neil Christie (rower) =

British rower (born 1953)

Personal information
- Full name: Alastair Neil Christie
- Nationality: British
- Born: 11 May 1953 (age 72)

Sport
- Sport: Rowing
- Club: London Rowing Club; Marlow

Alastair Neil Christie (born 11 May 1953) is a retired British rower who competed at the 1976 Summer Olympics and the 1980 Summer Olympics.

== Rowing career ==
Christie was selected for the Great Britain crew which competed in the men's coxed pair at the 1976 Olympic Games. The crew which consisted of James MacLeod and David Webb (cox) finished in seventh place. In 1977, while rowing for the London Rowing Club he won the coxless pairs with MacLeod and the coxed pairs with MacLeod and Webb, at the 1977 National Rowing Championships. Later that year he was part of the coxed pair that finished 10th overall after a fourth-place finish in the B final at the 1977 World Rowing Championships in Amsterdam.

A second Olympic Games appearance came in 1980 as part of the men's coxed pair again and with the same crew they finished in ninth place. Two years later he won the coxless pairs title with MacLeod again, rowing for the London Club, at the 1982 National Rowing Championships.
