= Annibale Venier =

Italian rower

Personal information
- Full name: Annibale Silvano Venier
- Nationality: Italian
- Born: 30 July 1951 (age 73)
- Relatives: Simone Venier (son)

Sport
- Sport: Rowing

Annibale Silvano Venier (born 30 July 1951) is an Italian rower. He participated at the 1976 Summer Olympics and the 1988 Summer Olympics. His son, Simone Venier, is an Olympic silver medalist in rowing.
