= Hadriaan van Nes =

Dutch rower (1942–2024)

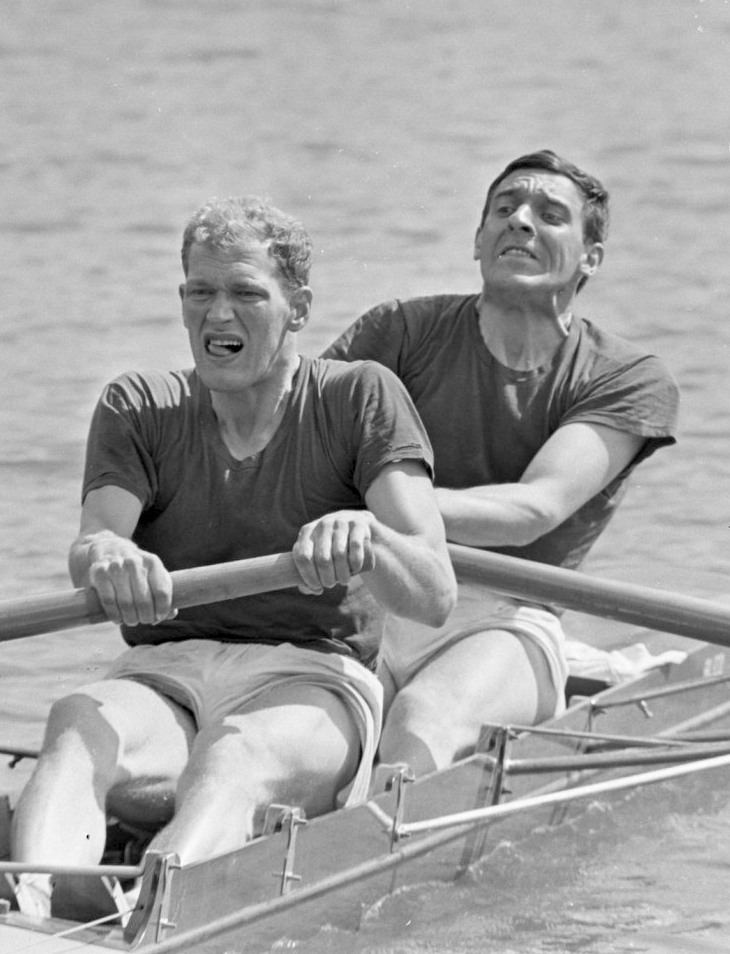
- Van Nes and Herman Suselbeek in 1968

Personal information
- Born: 7 August 1942 Gorinchem, German-occupied Netherlands
- Died: 9 October 2024 (aged 82)
- Height: 1.92 m (6 ft 4 in)
- Weight: 89 kg (196 lb)

Sport
- Sport: Rowing
- Club: Laga, Delft
Medal record
Representing the Netherlands
Olympic Games
Silver medal – second place	1968 Mexico City	Coxed pair
World Rowing Championships
Gold medal – first place	1966 Bled	Coxed pair
European Rowing Championships
Bronze medal – third place	1965 Duisburg	Coxed pair

Hadriaan van Nes (7 August 1942 – 9 October 2024) was a Dutch rower who won the silver medal in the coxed pairs at the 1968 Summer Olympics, alongside Roderick Rijnders and Herman Suselbeek. He won a world title in 1966 and a European bronze medal in 1965 in this event. His daughter Eeke van Nes also became an Olympic rower. His wife Meike de Vlas had died in 2022.

Van Nes died on 9 October 2024, at the age of 82.
