= Alfredo Valladares =

Cuban rower

Personal information
- Full name: Alfredo Valladares Pérez
- Nationality: Cuban
- Born: 15 September 1958 (age 67)

Sport
- Sport: Rowing
Medal record
Men's rowing
Representing Cuba
Pan American Games
Gold medal – first place	1979 San Juan	Coxed four
Bronze medal – third place	1979 San Juan	Eight

Alfredo Valladares Pérez (Note: In this Spanish name, the first or paternal surname is Valladares and the second or maternal family name is Pérez.) (born 15 September 1958) is a Cuban rower. He competed in the men's coxed pair event at the 1980 Summer Olympics.
