= David Webb (rowing) =

British coxswain

Personal information
- Nationality: British
- Born: 21 April 1943
- Died: 25 June 2020 (aged 77)

Sport
- Sport: Rowing
- Club: London RC

David Webb (21 April 1943 – 25 June 2020) was a British rowing coxswain who competed at the 1976 Summer Olympics and the 1980 Summer Olympics.

== Rowing career ==
Webb was selected for the Great Britain crew which competed in the men's coxed pair at the 1976 Olympic Games. The crew which consisted of James MacLeod and Neil Christie finished in seventh place. In 1977, while rowing for the London Rowing Club he won the coxed pairs with MacLeod and Christie, at the 1977 National Rowing Championships. Later that year he was part of the coxed pair that finished 10th overall after a fourth-place finish in the B final at the 1977 World Rowing Championships in Amsterdam.

A second Olympic Games appearance came in 1980 as part of the men's coxed pair again and with the same crew of MacLeod and Christie they finished in ninth place.
