= Milan Butorac =

Croatian rower

Personal information
- Nationality: Croatian
- Born: 27 August 1952 (age 72); Novi Vinodolski, Yugoslavia

Sport
- Sport: Rowing

Milan Butorac (born 27 August 1952) is a Croatian rower. He competed in the men's coxed pair event at the 1976 Summer Olympics.
