= Richard Edmunds (rower) =

American rower

Personal information
- Nationality: American
- Born: August 1, 1947 (age 78) Springville, New York, United States

Sport
- Sport: Rowing

Richard Edmunds (born August 1, 1947) is an American rower. He competed in the men's coxed pair event at the 1968 Summer Olympics.
