= Armando Castro =

Mexican rower (born 1952)

Personal information
- Born: 10 December 1952 (age 73) Mexico City, Mexico

Sport
- Sport: Rowing

Armando Castro (born 10 December 1952) is a Mexican rower. He competed in the men's coxed pair event at the 1968 Summer Olympics.
