= Șuletea =

- Commune
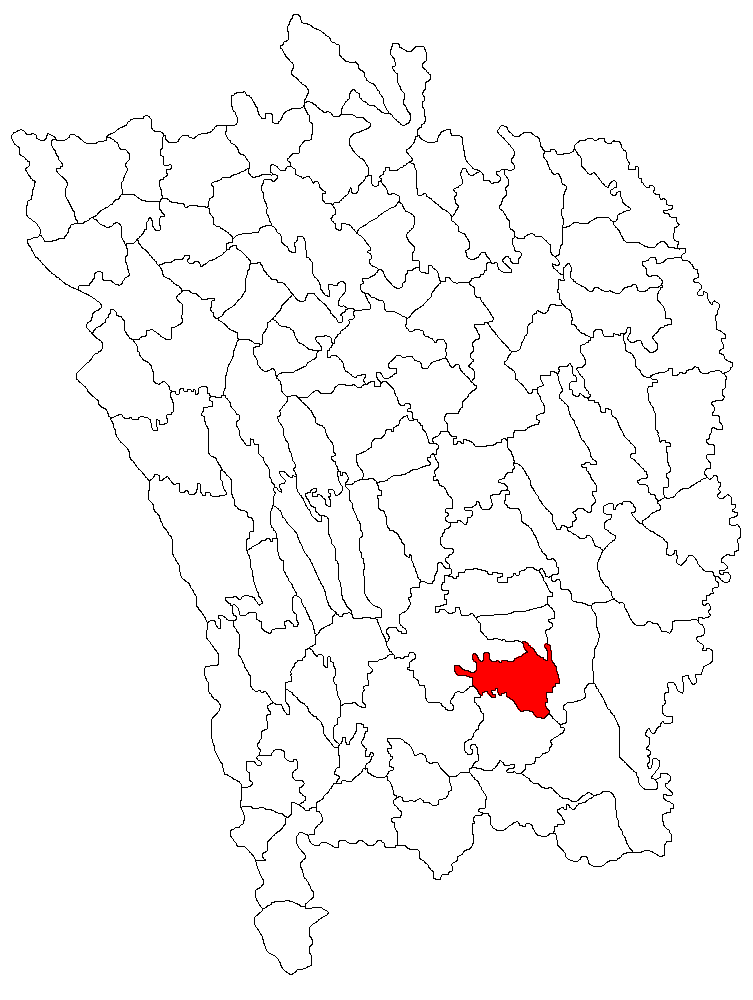
- Location in Vaslui County

- Location in Romania
- Coordinates: 46°17′11″N 27°54′50″E
- Country: Romania
- County: Vaslui
- Subdivisions: Fedești, Jigalia, Rășcani, Șuletea

Government
  - Mayor (2020–2024): Ciprian-Robert Tamaș (PSD)
- Area: 50.05 km^{2} (19.32 sq mi)
- Elevation: 236 m (774 ft)
- Population (2021-12-01): 2,066
  - Density: 41.28/km^{2} (106.9/sq mi)
- Time zone: UTC+02:00 (EET)
  - Summer (DST): UTC+03:00 (EEST)
- Postal code: 737505
- Area code: (+40) 0235
- Vehicle reg.: VS
- Website: comunasuletea.ro

Șuletea is a commune in Vaslui County, Western Moldavia, Romania. It is composed of four villages: Fedești, Jigălia, Rășcani, and Șuletea.

Historical population
Year	Pop.	±%
2002	2,529	—
2011	2,288	−9.5%
2021	2,066	−9.7%
Source: Census data

== Natives ==
- Gabriel Bularda (born 1954), rower
- Virgil Caraivan (1879–1966), prose writer
