= Friedrich-Wilhelm Ulrich =

East German rower (born 1953)

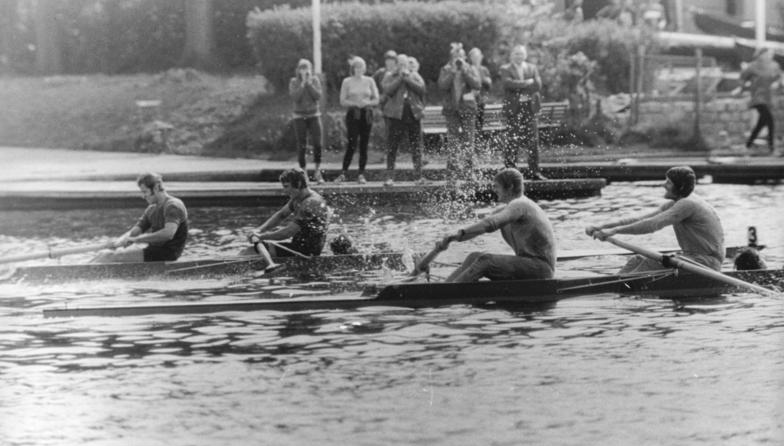
- Ulrich (second from left) with Harald Jährling as stroke and cox Georg Spohr in 1976

Personal information
- Born: 20 October 1953 (age 72) Packebusch, East Germany
- Height: 194 cm (6 ft 4 in)
- Weight: 103 kg (227 lb)

Sport
- Sport: Rowing
- Club: SC Magdeburg
Medal record
Men's rowing
Representing East Germany
Olympic Games
Gold medal – first place	1976 Montreal	Coxed pair
Gold medal – first place	1980 Moscow	Coxed pair
World Rowing Championships
Gold medal – first place	1975 Nottingham	Eight
Silver medal – second place	1977 Amsterdam	Coxed pair
Gold medal – first place	1978 Cambridge	Eight
European Rowing Championships
Gold medal – first place	1973 Moscow	Eight

Friedrich-Wilhelm Ulrich (born 20 October 1953) is a German rower who competed for East Germany in the 1976 Summer Olympics and in the 1980 Summer Olympics.

He was born in Packebusch. In 1976 he was a crew member of the East German boat which won the gold medal in the coxed pairs event. Four years later he won his second gold medal with the East German boat in the coxed pairs competition.
