= Primo Baran =

Italian rower (born 1943)

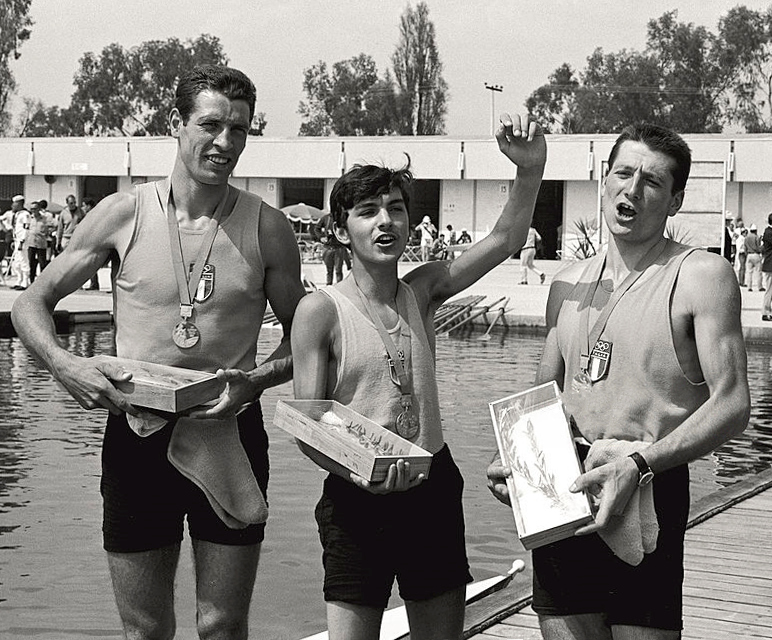
- Renzo Sambo, Bruno Cipolla and Primo Baran (right) at the 1968 Olympics

Personal information
- Born: 1 April 1943 (age 83) Treviso, Italy
- Height: 1.79 m (5 ft 10 in)
- Weight: 76 kg (168 lb)

Sport
- Sport: Rowing
- Club: Ospedalieri CC, Treviso
Medal record
Men's rowing
Representing Italy
Olympic Games
Gold medal – first place	1968 Mexico City	Coxed pair
World Championships
Bronze medal – third place	1966 Bled	Coxed pair
European Championships
Gold medal – first place	1967 Vichy	Coxed pair
Silver medal – second place	1965 Duisburg	Coxed pair
Silver medal – second place	1969 Klagenfurt	Coxed pair

Primo Baran (born 1 April 1943) is a retired Italian rower who had his best achievements in the coxed pairs, together with Renzo Sambo. They won a European title in 1967 and an Olympic gold in 1968.

Baran took rowing in 1962 and worked as a rowing coach after retiring from competitions.
