= Herman Suselbeek =

Dutch rower

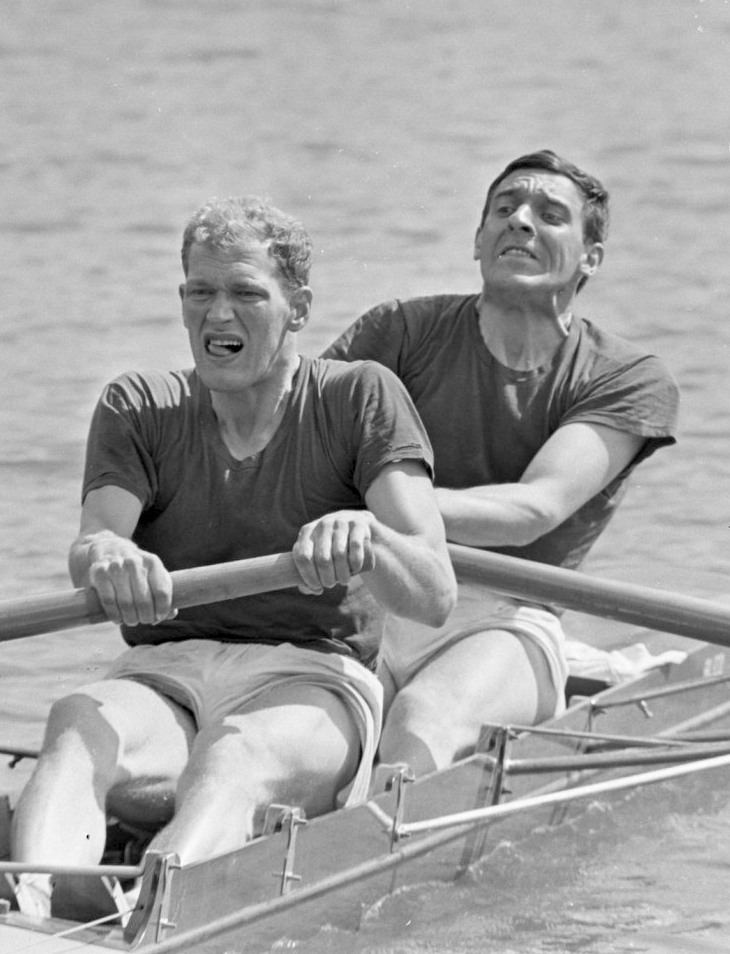
- Hadriaan van Nes and Herman Suselbeek in 1968

Personal information
- Born: 27 November 1943 (age 82) Silvolde, Gelderland, the Netherlands
- Height: 1.83 m (6 ft 0 in)
- Weight: 85 kg (187 lb)

Sport
- Sport: Rowing
- Club: Laga, Delft
Medal record
Representing the Netherlands
Olympic Games
Silver medal – second place	1968 Mexico City	Coxed pair

Herman Johan "Suus" Suselbeek (born 27 November 1943) is a retired rower from the Netherlands, who won the silver medal in the coxed pairs at the 1968 Summer Olympics, alongside Hadriaan van Nes and coxswain Roderick Rijnders.
