= Urs Fankhauser =

Swiss rower (1943–2018)

Personal information
- Born: 3 August 1943
- Died: 10 January 2018 (aged 74)

Sport
- Sport: Rowing

Urs Fankhauser (3 August 1943 – 10 January 2018) was a Swiss rower. He competed at the 1968 Summer Olympics in Mexico City and the 1972 Summer Olympics in Munich.

During his career he won 24 Swiss national titles. He also had a victory in the coxless pairs at the 1969 Henley Royal Regatta. Fankhauser later became a Swiss rowing official, officiating at many events both national and international. In 2015 he was awarded an SRV (Swiss Rowing Association) Honorary Membership.

Urs Fankhauser was married to Marianne Gossweiler, a two-time Swiss Olympian in dressage riding.
