= Nilton Alonso =

Brazilian rower

Nilton da Silva Alonço
Personal information
- Born: 27 May 1949 Arroio dos Ratos, Brazil
- Died: November 2023 (aged 74)

Sport
- Sport: Rowing
Medal record
Representing Brazil
Pan American Games
Silver medal – second place	1983 Caracas	Coxed fours
Silver medal – second place	1987 Indianapolis	Eights
Silver medal – second place	2003 Santo Domingo	Eights

Nilton da Silva Alonço (27 May 1949 – November 2023), also known as Gauchinho, was a Brazilian rowing coxswain. He competed at the 1976 Summer Olympics, 1984 Summer Olympics, 1988 Summer Olympics and the 2008 Summer Paralympics.
