= Jean-Claude Coucardon =

French rower (1950–2019)

Personal information
- Nationality: French
- Born: 12 August 1950
- Died: 21 September 2019 (aged 69)

Sport
- Sport: Rowing

Jean-Claude Coucardon (12 August 1950 – 21 September 2019) was a French rower. He competed at the 1972 Summer Olympics and the 1976 Summer Olympics.
