= Michael Ahlers =

German music educator

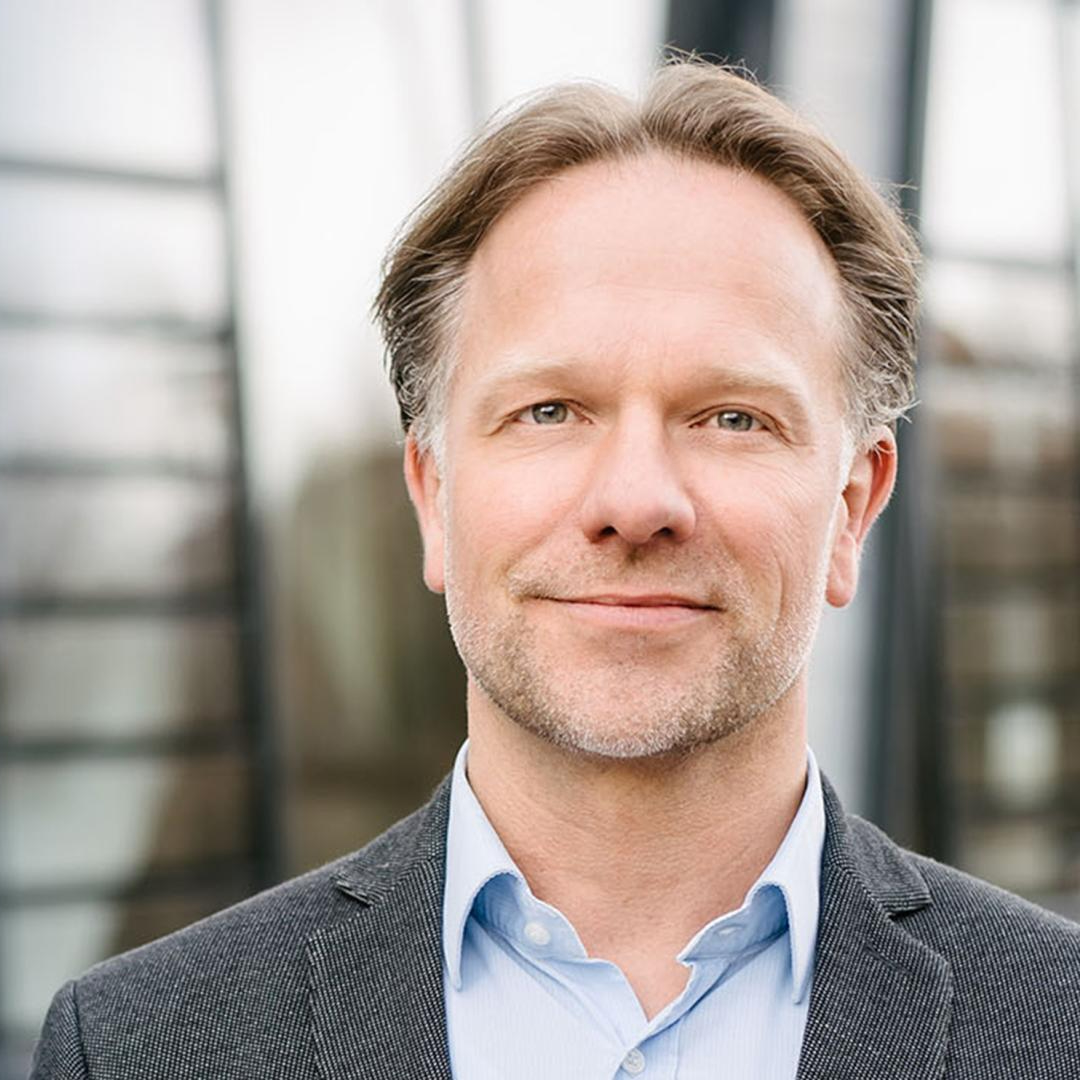
Michael Ahlers (2017)

Michael Ahlers (born 1973) is a German music educator.

== Life ==
Ahlers graduated as a teacher for secondary education in the subjects Germanistics and literature and music with the artistic main subject guitar as well as musicology. After his studies, he worked as managing editor of the journal Musikunterricht und Computer (MUC) at Lugert Verlag. After the third issue, he took over editorial activities in the publishing house and additionally supervised individual projects in the areas of "Content Management" as well as "Network Administration". Since 2005, he worked as a research assistant at the Paderborn University and in 2008, he received his Dr. phil. Since 2009 he was academic council at the Paderborn University.

In 2010, he received an appointment to a professorship in music education with a focus on digital media at the Leopold Mozart Centre of the University of Augsburg. Since June 2012, he has held a professorship for music education at the Leuphana Universität Lüneburg. In September 2012, he accepted the appointment to a professorship for music didactics with a focus on pop music at the same University.

== Projects (selection) ==
- since 2020: Digital-gestütztes Üben im Fachunterricht: Kompetente Lehrkräfte — individualisierte Lernprozesse (CODIP).
- since 2017: Musikalische Interface-Designs: Augmentierte Kreativität und Konnektivität.
- 2019 until 2020: Digitale Bildung.
- 2016 until 2019: Qualitätsoffensive Lehrerbildung.
- 2015 until 2019: Kompetenzorientierte Unterrichtsgestaltung.
- 2017 until 2018: Medien im Musikunterricht.
- 2017 until 2018: StadtRaumKlang.
- 2016 until 2017 Lehreinheiten Basiskompetenzen Inklusion in den Fachdidaktiken.

== Publications (selection) ==
- Musik und Empowerment, Ahlers, M., Grünewald-Schukalla, L., Jóri, A., Schwetter, H. (ed.) series: Jahrbuch für Musikwirtschafts- und Musikkulturforschung 2020. Springer VS. ISBN 978-3-658-29705-3
- Musik und Straße (edited with Martin Lücke und Matthias Rauch). Springer VS, Wiesbaden 2019, ISBN 978-3-658-26100-9
- Lehrerband O-Ton Oberstufe, Ahlers, M. (ed.), Lang, R. (ed.) & Schläbitz, N. (ed.) 10 May 2019 Braunschweig: Bildungshaus Schulbuchverlage Westermann, 551 S.
- Big Data und Musik (ed. with Lorenz Grünewald-Schukalla, Martin Lücke, Matthia Rauch). Jahrbuch für Musikwirtschafts- und Musikkulturforschung 1/2018. Springer VS, Wiesbaden 2019. ISBN 978-3-658-21219-3
- Perspectives on German Popular Music, edited by Michael Ahlers and Christophe Jacke. Abingdon: Routledge, 2017. xvii + 320 ppp. ISBN 978-1-4724-7962-4
- O-Ton Oberstufe: Arbeitsbuch für den Musikunterricht, Ahlers, M. L. J. (ed.), Lang, R. (ed.) & Schläbitz, N. (ed.) 30 January 2017 Paderborn: Schöningh Verlag. 560 S.
- Popmusik-Vermittlung. Zwischen Schule, Universität und Beruf (ed.). Reihe: Theorie und Praxis der Musikvermittlung, vol. 14. LIT Verlag, Berlin, Münster 2015. ISBN 978-3-643-12997-0
- Die weltweite Suche nach dem Weihnachtsmann. Ein Kindermusical (with Katja Schmollack and Dimitri Metzeltin). Oldershausen, Lugert 2002, ISBN 978-3-89760-221-2
