= Oldřich Hejdušek =

Czech rowing coxswain

Personal information
- Nationality: Czech
- Born: 1 October 1957 (age 67); Brno, Czechoslovakia

Sport
- Sport: Rowing

Oldřich Hejdušek (born 1 October 1957) is a Czech rowing coxswain. He competed at the 1980 Summer Olympics, 1988 Summer Olympics and the 1992 Summer Olympics.
