= Wandir Kuntze =

Brazilian rower

Personal information
- Nationality: Brazilian
- Born: 23 August 1950 (age 74)

Sport
- Sport: Rowing

Wandir Kuntze (born 23 August 1950) is a Brazilian rower. He competed at the 1976 Summer Olympics and the 1980 Summer Olympics.
