= Liam Williams (rowing) =

Irish rower

Personal information
- Nationality: Irish
- Born: 8 February 1960 (age 65)

Sport
- Sport: Rowing

Liam Williams (born 8 February 1960) is an Irish rowing coxswain. He competed at the 1980 Summer Olympics and the 1988 Summer Olympics.
