= Franco Venturini (rower) =

Italian rower

Personal information
- Nationality: Italian
- Born: 26 May 1959 (age 66)

Sport
- Sport: Rowing

Franco Venturini (born 26 May 1959) is an Italian rower. He competed in the men's coxed pair event at the 1976 Summer Olympics.
