= Eleanor E. Ahlers =

American teacher and librarian

- Ahlers in 1931
- Born: Eleanor E. Ahlers; May 16, 1911; Seattle, Washington, U.S.
- Died: November 24, 1997 (aged 86); Seattle, Washington, U.S.
- Education: {{University of Washington (B.A., M.A.)|University of Denver (B.L.S.)}}
- Occupation: school librarian
- Employer(s): Everett Public Schools, American Association of School Libraries
- Organization(s): American Association of School Libraries, Washington State Association of School Librarians, American Association of School Librarians, Association of American Library Schools, Washington Association of Educational Communication and Technology, Pacific Northwest Library Association

Eleanor E. Ahlers (May 16, 1911 – November 24, 1997) was a foreign languages teacher, teacher-librarian and university professor who served as president of the American Association of School Libraries. Ahlers advocated for improved school library media collections, services, and full librarian involvement in curriculum development in the State of Washington and nationally. Eleanor Ahlers died on November 24, 1997, in Seattle at the age of 85.

== Education ==
Eleanor. E. Ahlers began her university career at the University of Washington, where she received a Bachelor of Arts in French in 1932. She got a Bachelor of Library Science from the University of Denver in 1942. She continued her education with course work at the University of California, Berkeley during the summer of 1948. Finally, she returned to the University of Washington and received an M.A. in Curriculum Studies in 1957.

== Career ==
After graduating from the University of Washington, Ahlers was an English and foreign languages teacher in South Bend, Washington, from 1932 to 1936. Following her graduation from the University of Denver, she began a career as a school librarian, beginning with a high school position in Everett, Washington, from 1942 to 1953, and ultimately moving to a more senior position as supervisor of school libraries from 1952 to 1953.

A combination of practical experience and passion for school librarianship led Ahlers to a new position as assistant professor of library science at the School of Education at the University of Oregon from 1953 to 1957. Although she had previously taught teacher-librarian courses at the University of Wyoming during the summers of 1945 and 1946, as well as at San Jose State College during the summers of 1947 and 1952, her acceptance of the assistant professor position was her first full-time university teaching job.

Ahlers was executive secretary of the American Association of School Libraries (AASL) from 1957 to 1961. After that, she became the first supervisor of library services at the Washington Department of Public Instruction in Olympia from 1961 to 1966. She ended her career at the University of Washington as associate professor position from 1966 to 1970 and as professor from 1970 to 1976.

She received many honors during her career, including entries in Who's Who in America, Who's Who in the West, and Who's Who of American Women.

== Publications and research ==
At the Department of Public Instruction in Olympia, she edited “Notes from Everywhere for Washington School Librarians,” recognized as a valuable contribution to the profession within the state. Ahler's publications focused on the neglected area of the role and competencies of the school district library supervisor.

Ahlers shared a commitment to the study of the relationship between school libraries and curriculum and general principles of librarianship throughout her professional career, as was indicated by her master's thesis, “A Study of Library Services in Fifty-four Oregon High Schools which Have Utilized the Evaluative Criteria of the Cooperative Study of Secondary-School Standards."

Ahlers wrote more than 25 articles and contributed to other publications as an editor and a reviewer. Besides participating in numerous research projects as a member and director, she consulted with school districts in various areas in Washington State. Her research took her to more than 35 speaking engagements throughout the United States and Canada.

Much of her writing focused on children. She wrote articles about children's books, ways to attract children to libraries, and interpreting books for young people. She also created annotated bibliographies about literature for children.

== Associations ==
Ahlers was an active member of many professional organizations, including the Washington State Association of School Librarians, of which she was president from 1950 to 1951. She was president of the American Association of School Librarians from 1966 to 1967. Ahlers also had other leadership positions with the American Library Association dating back to the early 1950s (e.g., Council, 1962–1965). She was also active in the Association of American Library Schools, the Washington Association of Educational Communication and Technology, and the Pacific Northwest Library Association.
