= Georgi Nikolov (rower) =

Bulgarian rower

Personal information
- Nationality: Bulgarian
- Born: 12 March 1938 (age 87); Sofia, Bulgaria

Sport
- Sport: Rowing

Georgi Nikolov (Bulgarian: Георги Николов) (born 12 March 1938) is a Bulgarian rower. He competed in the men's coxed pair event at the 1968 Summer Olympics.
