= Silvio Rosabal =

Cuban coxswain

Personal information
- Full name: Silvio Rosabal Bianco
- Nationality: Cuban
- Born: 31 December 1963 (age 62)
- Height: 170 cm (5 ft 7 in)
- Weight: 50 kg (110 lb)

Sport
- Sport: Rowing
Medal record
Men's rowing
Representing Cuba
Pan American Games
Bronze medal – third place	1979 San Juan	Coxed pair

Silvio Rosabal Bianco (born 31 December 1963) is a Cuban rowing coxswain. He competed in the men's coxed pair event at the 1980 Summer Olympics.
