= Georgi Atanasov (rower) =

Bulgarian rower

Personal information
- Nationality: Bulgarian
- Born: 17 February 1947 (age 78); Sofia, Bulgaria

Sport
- Sport: Rowing

Georgi Atanasov (Bulgarian: Георги Атанасов, born 17 February 1947) is a Bulgarian rower. He competed in the men's coxed pair event at the 1968 Summer Olympics.
