= Emilio Ahlers =

Uruguayan rower (born 1942)

Personal information
- Born: 22 October 1942 Carmelo, Uruguay
- Died: 15 October 1995 (aged 52)

Sport
- Sport: Rowing

Emilio Ahlers (22 October 1942 – 15 October 1995) was a Uruguayan rower. He competed in the men's coxed pair event at the 1968 Summer Olympics.
