= Uwe Benter =

German rowing cox

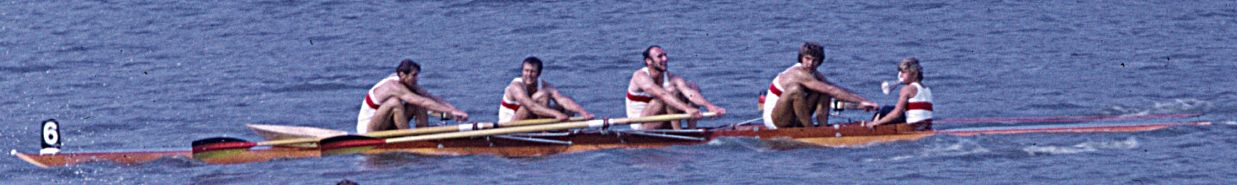
- Benter (cox) at the 1971 European Rowing Championships

Personal information
- Born: 1 December 1955 (age 70) Frankfurt am Main, West Germany
- Relatives: Lutz Benter (brother)

Sport
- Sport: Rowing
- Club: Hanauer RC Hassia
Medal record
Men's rowing
Representing West Germany
Olympic Games
Gold medal – first place	1972 Munich	Coxed four
World Rowing Championships
Bronze medal – third place	1974 Lucerne	Coxed four
European Rowing Championships
Gold medal – first place	1971 Copenhagen	Coxed four

Uwe Benter (born 1 December 1955) is a German coxswain who competed for West Germany in the 1972 Summer Olympics.

He was born in Frankfurt am Main in 1955 and is the younger brother of Lutz Benter (born 1945), also an Olympic rower. He won a gold medal at the 1971 European Rowing Championships in Copenhagen with the coxed four. At the 1972 Summer Olympics, he was the cox of the West German boat that won the gold medal in the coxed four event. At the 1974 World Rowing Championships in Lucerne, he won bronze with the coxed four.
