= Josef Plamínek =

Czech rower

Personal information
- Nationality: Czech
- Born: 12 June 1954 (age 70); Ústí nad Labem, Czechoslovakia

Sport
- Country: Czechoslovakia
- Sport: Rowing

Josef Plamínek (born 12 June 1954) is a Czech rower. He competed for Czechoslovakia at the 1976 Summer Olympics and the 1980 Summer Olympics.
