= John Albert Mathews =

American rower

John Albert "Monster" Mathews (born in Wichita, Kansas) is an American former competitive rower, U.S. Olympian and Pan American. He was a member of the 1975 World Championship Team to Nottingham, England, where he placed fifth in the coxed pair. Mathews was also a member of the U.S. Olympic Team competing in the 1976 Summer Olympics in Montreal in the men's coxed pair event.

Vesper Coxed Pair (Vreugdenhil, Mathews, Dreyfus) Lucerne International Regatta

John Mathews graduated Wooster School in Danbury, CT in 1970. He is a Worcester Polytechnic Institute alum and is the only Olympian who trained while a student at WPI in its history. He rowed on its crew team from 1972 to 1974. His Varsity boat won the Worcester City Championships in 1973 and 1974 on Lake Quinsigamond.

Joining Vesper Boat Club in 1974, Mathews won U.S. National Championships in the coxed four in 1975 and the coxed pair in 1975 and 1976, as well as winning in the coxed four at the Canadian Henley Royal Regatta in 1974 He won Head of the Charles Boston, MA first place medals on the same day in the elite eight (Boston Globe Trophy) and elite four with coxswain (Schaefer Trophy) in 1975 and repeating the wins again in 1976 for Vesper Boat Club, Philadelphia, under coach Dietrich Rose.

His coxed pair placed second in 1975 at the Lucerne International Regatta. They and the World Champion coxed pair from the Soviet Union raced in lane 1 and 8 respectfully, bow-to-bow the entire race. They finished behind the World Champions by 6-hundredths of a second - the first time on the world stage that he and Darrell Vreugdenhill, along with coxswain Kenneth Dreyfus rowed the pair-with together. Later that fall, they won a gold medal in the coxed pair event at the 1975 Pan American Games at Mexico City.

John Mathews, Gold Medal, Pan American Games, Mexico City

In the Spring of 1976, his pair with coxswain trained at the Ratzeburger Ruderclub in Ratzeburg, GE, the center for elite rowing in West Germany, under Karl Adam. They won the European Championships at the International Wedau Regatta in Duisburg, GE, in the coxed pair event. The first place prize was a medal of the seal of the City of Duisburg.

In 1978, Mathews joined the Boston Rugby Club as a second row forward, and also played for the Hartford Wanderers Rugby Club. He joined the U.S. Naval Reserves in 1986, reaching the rank of Lieutenant Commander in the Civil Engineer Corps, serving in Naval Mobile Construction Battalions 12, 13, and 27 (the Seabees), as well as the 7th Naval Construction Regiment, and as a Contingency Engineer for U.S. European Command Headquarters in Stuttgart, GE.

As a member of Yankee Rowing Club in 2007 Mathews won the Blackburn Challenge, Gloucester, MA, rowing in the Touring Class Single, Sliding Seat in a 20+ mile open ocean race circumnavigating Cape Ann. He worked at the University of Massachusetts Amherst in Amherst, MA as a Facility Manager and an Associate Faculty member, where he retired in 2019.

== Rowing ==
=== Representing the United States ===
Place	Year	Competition
Gold	1975	Mexico Pan American Games (M2+)
5th	1975	Nottingham World Rowing Championships (M2+)
11th	1976	Montreal Olympic Games (M2+)

=== Representing Vesper Boat Club, Philadelphia ===
Place	Year	Competition
1st	1976	European Championships/International Wedau Regatta (M2+),
2nd	1975	Lucerne International Regatta (M2+)
1st	1975	US Rowing National Championships (M2+)
1st	1975	US Rowing National Championships (M4+)
1st	1976	US Rowing National Championships (M2+)
1st	1974	Canadian Henley (M4+)
1st	1975	Head of the Charles Regatta (M8+ Elite)
1st	1975	Head of the Charles Regatta (M4+ Elite)
1st	1976	Head of the Charles Regatta (M8+ Elite)
1st	1976	Head of the Charles Regatta (M4+ Elite)
