= Teófilo López =

Cuban rower

Personal information
- Born: 2 November 1943 (age 81); Havana, Cuba

Sport
- Sport: Rowing

Teófilo López (born 2 November 1943) is a Cuban rower. He competed at the 1968 Summer Olympics and the 1972 Summer Olympics.
