= José Ahlers =

Uruguayan rower (born 1941)

Personal information
- Born: 15 January 1941 Carmelo, Uruguay
- Died: 12 December 2013 (aged 72)

Sport
- Sport: Rowing

José Ahlers (15 January 1941 – 12 December 2013) was a Uruguayan rower. He competed in the men's coxed pair event at the 1968 Summer Olympics.
