= Lutz Benter =

German rowing cox

Personal information
- Born: 20 December 1945 (age 80) Strande, Germany
- Height: 162 cm (5 ft 4 in)
- Weight: 51 kg (112 lb)
- Relatives: Uwe Benter (brother)

Sport
- Sport: Rowing
Medal record
Men's rowing
Representing West Germany
European Rowing Championships
Bronze medal – third place	1969 Klagenfurt	Eight

Lutz Benter (born 20 December 1945) is a German coxswain who represented West Germany.

He competed at the 1968 Summer Olympics in Mexico City with the men's coxed pair where they came sixth. At the 1969 European Rowing Championships in Klagenfurt, he won bronze with the men's eight. At the 1971 European Rowing Championships in Copenhagen, he came sixth with the men's eight.

His younger brother Uwe is also an Olympic coxswain; he won gold with the coxed four in 1972.
