= Diego Nedelcu =

Argentine rower

Personal information
- Born: 30 August 1947 (age 78); Buenos Aires, Argentina

Sport
- Sport: Rowing

Diego Nedelcu (born 30 August 1947) is an Argentine rower. He competed in the men's coxed pair event at the 1968 Summer Olympics.
