= Michel Riendeau =

Canadian rower

Personal information
- Born: 29 January 1955 (age 70); Montreal, Quebec, Canada

Sport
- Sport: Rowing

Michel Riendeau (born 29 January 1955) is a Canadian rowing coxswain. He competed in the men's coxed pair event at the 1976 Summer Olympics.
