= Bernhard Hiesinger =

German rower

Personal information
- Born: 27 April 1947 (age 77); Albstadt, Germany
- Height: 192 cm (6 ft 4 in)
- Weight: 92 kg (203 lb)

Sport
- Sport: Rowing

Bernhard Hiesinger (born 27 April 1947) is a German rower who represented West Germany. He competed at the 1968 Summer Olympics in Mexico City with the men's coxless pair where they came twelfth.
