= Yves Fraisse =

French rower

Personal information
- Nationality: French
- Born: 14 November 1943 (age 81); Saint-Louis, Senegal

Sport
- Sport: Rowing

Yves Fraisse (born 14 November 1943) is a French rower. He competed at the 1964, 1968, 1972 and the 1976 Summer Olympics.
