= Georg Spohr =

German rowing coxswain (born 1951)

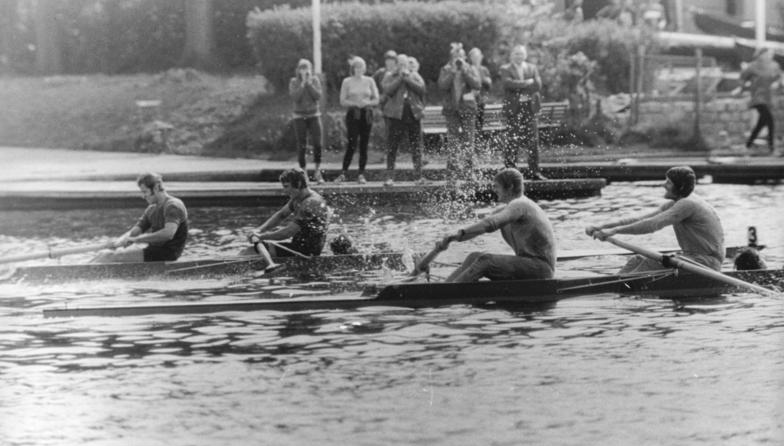
- In the rear boat from left to right: Harald Jährling, Friedrich-Wilhelm Ulrich and Georg Spohr, 1976.

Personal information
- Born: 24 January 1951 (age 75) Magdeburg, East Germany
- Height: 146 cm (4 ft 9 in)
- Weight: 45 kg (99 lb)

Sport
- Sport: Rowing
- Club: SC Magdeburg
Medal record
Men's rowing
Gold medal – first place	1976 Montreal	Coxed pair
Gold medal – first place	1980 Moscow	Coxed pair
World Rowing Championships
Silver medal – second place	1977 Amsterdam	Coxed pair
Gold medal – first place	1979 Bled	Coxed pair

Georg Spohr (born 24 January 1951) is a German rowing coxswain who competed for East Germany in the 1976 and in the 1980 Summer Olympics.

He was born in Magdeburg. In 1976 he was the coxswain of the East German boat that won the gold medal in the coxed pair event. Four years later he won his second gold medal when he again coxed the East German boat in the coxed pair competition.
