= Todor Kishev =

Bulgarian rowing cox

Personal information
- Nationality: Bulgarian
- Born: 9 June 1950 (age 74)

Sport
- Sport: Rowing

Todor Kishev (Bulgarian: Тодор Кишев, born 9 June 1950) is a Bulgarian rowing coxswain. He competed at the 1976 Summer Olympics and the 1980 Summer Olympics.
