= Tsvetan Petkov =

Bulgarian rower (born 1956)

Personal information
- Nationality: Bulgarian
- Born: 5 March 1956 (age 70)
- Height: 190 cm (6 ft 3 in)
- Weight: 90 kg (198 lb)

Sport
- Sport: Rowing
Medal record
Men's rowing
Representing Bulgaria
World Rowing Championships
Bronze medal – third place	1977 Amsterdam	Coxed four
Bronze medal – third place	1978 Karapiro	Coxed four

Tsvetan Petkov (Bulgarian: Цветан Петков, born 5 March 1956) is a Bulgarian rower. He competed at the 1976 Summer Olympics and the 1980 Summer Olympics.
