= Rowing at the 2011 Pan American Games – Men's eight =

Rowing – Men's eight at the 2011 Pan American Games
- Venue: Canoe & Rowing Course
- Dates: October 15 – October 17
- Competitors: 48 from 6 nations

Medalists
Gold medal	Jason Read; Stephen Kasprzyk; Matthew Wheeler; Joseph Spencer; Michael Gennaro; Robert Otto; Blaise Didier; Marcus McElhenney; Derek Johnson	United States
Silver medal	Peter McClelland; Steven Van Knotsenburg; David Wakulich; Kai Langerfeld; Blake Parsons; Spencer Crowley; Joshua Morris; Benjamin De Wit; Mark Laidlaw	Canada
Bronze medal	Sebastian Fernandez; Joaquin Iwan; Rodrigo Murillo; Agustin Silvestro; Sebastian Claus; Diego Lopez; Joel Infante; Mariano Sosa; Ariel Suarez	Argentina

The men's eight rowing event at the 2011 Pan American Games will be held from October 15–17 at the Canoe & Rowing Course in Ciudad Guzman. The defending Pan American Games champion is Troy Kepper, Chris Callaghan, Gabe Winkler, Dan Beery, Cameron Winklevoss, Sebastian Bea, Patrick O'Dunne, Tyler Winklevoss, Ned Delguercio of the United States.

== Schedule ==
All times are Central Standard Time (UTC-6).

Date	Time	Round
October 15, 2011	9:40	Heat
October 17, 2011	9:08	Final

== Results ==
=== Heat 1 ===
Rank	Rowers	Country	Time	Notes
1	Read, Kasprzyk, Wheeler, Spencer, Gennaro, Otto, Didier, McElhenney, Johnson	United States	6:02.21	FA
2	McClelland, Van Knotsenburg, Wakulich, Langerfield, Parsons, Crowley, Morris, De Wit, Laidlaw	Canada	6:02.76	FA
3	Jamie Cuevas, Tejada, Cabrera, Armenta, Sanchez, Curiel, Loza, Valenzuela, Nicolas	Mexico	6:16.40	FA
4	Fernandez, Iwan, Murillo, Silvestro, Claus, Lopez, Infante, Sosa, Suarez	Argentina	6:17.73	FA
5	Basilo, Carrion, Freire, Concepción, Hernández, Oquendo, Juan Gonzalez, Perez, Rubio	Cuba	6:21.60	FA
6	Borges, Atoji, Tozzo, Da Silva, Mestre, Bitencourt, Nocetti, Vargas, Gomes	Brazil	7:42.26	FA

=== Final A ===
Rank	Rowers	Country	Time	Notes
1st place, gold medalist(s)	Read, Kasprzyk, Wheeler, Spencer, Gennaro, Otto, Didier, McElhenney, Johnson	United States	5:39.32	
2nd place, silver medalist(s)	McClelland, Van Knotsenburg, Wakulich, Langerfield, Parsons, Crowley, Morris, De Wit, Laidlaw	Canada	5:41.01	
3rd place, bronze medalist(s)	Fernandez, Iwan, Murillo, Silvestro, Claus, Lopez, Infante, Sosa, Suarez	Argentina	5:41.77	
4	Jamie Cuevas, Tejada, Cabrera, Armenta, Sanchez, Curiel, Loza, Valenzuela, Nicolas	Mexico	5:42.24	
5	Basilo, Carrion, Freire, Concepción, Hernández, Oquendo, Juan Gonzalez, Perez, Rubio	Cuba	5:45.69	
6	Borges, Atoji, Tozzo, Da Silva, Mestre, Bitencourt, Nocetti, Vargas, Gomes	Brazil	5:50.43	
