= Rowing at the 2011 Pan American Games – Men's quadruple sculls =

Rowing – Men's quadruple sculls at the 2011 Pan American Games
- Venue: Canoe & Rowing Course
- Dates: October 16 - October 18
- Competitors: 24 from 6 nations

Medalists
Gold medal	Alejandro Cucchietti; Santiago Fernández; Cristian Rosso; Ariel Suarez	Argentina
Silver medal	Janier Concepción; Adrian Oquendo; Eduardo Eubio; Yoennis Hernández	Cuba
Bronze medal	Horacio Rangel; Edgar Valenzuela; Patrick Loliger; Santiago Sataella	Mexico

The men's quadruple sculls rowing event at the 2011 Pan American Games will be held from October 16–18 at the Canoe & Rowing Course in Ciudad Guzman. The defending Pan American Games champion is Yuleydis Cascaret, Janier Concepción, Ángel Fournier and Yoennis Hernández of Cuba.

== Schedule ==
All times are Central Standard Time (UTC-6).

Date	Time	Round
October 15, 2011	10:00	Heats
October 18, 2011	10:35	Final

== Results ==
=== Heat 1 ===
Rank	Rowers	Country	Time	Notes
1	Janier Concepción, Adrian Oquendo, Eduardo Eubio, Yoennis Hernández	Cuba	6:14.99	FA
2	Alejandro Cucchietti, Santiago Fernández, Cristian Rosso, Ariel Suarez	Argentina	6:15.62	FA
3	Horacio Rangel, Edgar Valenzuela, Patrick Loliger, Santiago Sataella	Mexico	6:24.95	FA
4	German Anchieri, Jhonatan Esquivel, Martin Saldivia, Leandro Salvagno	Uruguay	6:29.05	FA
5	Daniel Urevick-Ackelseberg, Andrew Quinn, Robert Duff, Tom Paradiso	United States	6:31.46	FA
6	Jose Guipe, Cesar Amaris, Pedro Sanz, Emilio Torres	Venezuela	6:33.67	FA

=== Final A ===
Rank	Rowers	Country	Time	Notes
1st place, gold medalist(s)	Alejandro Cucchietti, Santiago Fernández, Cristian Rosso, Ariel Suarez	Argentina	5:51.20	
2nd place, silver medalist(s)	Janier Concepción, Adrian Oquendo, Eduardo Eubio, Yoennis Hernández	Cuba	5:51.69	
3rd place, bronze medalist(s)	Horacio Rangel, Edgar Valenzuela, Patrick Loliger, Santiago Sataella	Mexico	5:59.58	
4	Jose Guipe, Cesar Amaris, Pedro Sanz, Emilio Torres	Venezuela	6:05.23	
5	German Anchieri, Jhonatan Esquivel, Martin Saldivia, Leandro Salvagno	Uruguay	6:07.84	
6	Daniel Urevick-Ackelseberg, Andrew Quinn, Robert Duff, Tom Paradiso	United States	6:10.88	
