= Rowing at the 2011 Pan American Games – Men's coxless four =

Rowing – Men's coxless four at the 2011 Pan American Games
- Venue: Canoe & Rowing Course
- Dates: October 15 - October 17
- Competitors: 32 from 8 nations

Medalists
Gold medal	Sebastian Fernandez; Joaquin Iwan; Rodrigo Murillo; Agustin Silvestro	Argentina
Silver medal	David Wakulich; Kai Langerfeld; Blake Parsons; Spencer Crowley	Canada
Bronze medal	Yenser Basilo; Dionnis Carrion; Jorber Avila; Solaris Freire	Cuba

The men's coxless four rowing event at the 2011 Pan American Games will be held from October 15–17 at the Canoe & Rowing Course in Ciudad Guzman. The defending Pan American Games champion is Horacio Sicilia, Maximiliano Martínez, Joaquín Iwan and Diego López of Argentina.

== Schedule ==
All times are Central Standard Time (UTC-6).

Date	Time	Round
October 15, 2011	9:50	Heats
October 15, 2011	16:10	Repechage
October 17, 2011	10:12	Final B
October 17, 2011	10:09	Final A

== Results ==
=== Heat 1 ===
Rank	Rowers	Country	Time	Notes
1	Sebastian Fernandez, Joaquin Iwan, Rodrigo Murillo, Agustin Silvestro	Argentina	6:07.13	FA
2	Jason Read, Stephen Kasprzyk, Matthew Wheeler, Joseph Spencer	United States	6:07.43	R
3	Celio Amorim, Leandro Atoji, Ailson Silva, Anderson Nocetti	Brazil	6:53.42	R
4	Jhon Guala, Bryan Sola, Julio Arevalo, Carlos Gomez	Ecuador	6:54.75	R

=== Heat 2 ===
Rank	Rowers	Country	Time	Notes
1	David Wakulich, Kai Langerfield, Blake Parsons, Spencer Crowley	Canada	6:08.10	FA
2	Jamie Cuevas, Omar Tejada, Leopoldo Tejada, Juan Cabrera	Mexico	6:09.90	R
3	Yenser Basilo, Dionnis Carrion, Jorber Avila, Solaris Freire	Cuba	6:41.15	R
4	Vicente Vanega, Felipe Jarquin, Eddy Vanega, Hector Potoy	Nicaragua	6:49.04	R

=== Repechage ===
Rank	Rowers	Country	Time	Notes
1	Jamie Cuevas, Omar Tejada, Leopoldo Tejada, Juan Cabrera	Mexico	6:19.69	FA
2	Jason Read, Stephen Kasprzyk, Matthew Wheeler, Joseph Spencer	United States	6:20.27	FA
3	Yenser Basilo, Dionnis Carrion, Jorber Avila, Solaris Freire	Cuba	6:35.13	FA
4	Celio Amorim, Leandro Atoji, Ailson Silva, Anderson Nocetti	Brazil	6:37.50	FA
5	Vicente Vanega, Felipe Jarquin, Eddy Vanega, Hector Potoy	Nicaragua	6:41.26	FB
6	Jhon Guala, Bryan Sola, Julio Arevalo, Carlos Gomez	Ecuador	6:56.27	FB

=== Final B ===
Rank	Rowers	Country	Time	Notes
7	Vicente Vanega, Felipe Jarquin, Eddy Vanega, Hector Potoy	Nicaragua	6:34.64	
8	Jhon Guala, Bryan Sola, Julio Arevalo, Carlos Gomez	Ecuador	6:40.30	

=== Final A ===
Rank	Rowers	Country	Time	Notes
1st place, gold medalist(s)	Sebastian Fernandez, Joaquin Iwan, Rodrigo Murillo, Agustin Silvestro	Argentina	6:04.41	
2nd place, silver medalist(s)	David Wakulich, Kai Langerfield, Blake Parsons, Spencer Crowley	Canada	6:05.65	
3rd place, bronze medalist(s)	Yenser Basilo, Dionnis Carrion, Jorber Avila, Solaris Freire	Cuba	6:06.51	
4	Jamie Cuevas, Omar Tejada, Leopoldo Tejada, Juan Cabrera	Mexico	6:06.59	
5	Jason Read, Stephen Kasprzyk, Matthew Wheeler, Joseph Spencer	United States	6:07.85	
6	Celio Amorim, Leandro Atoji, Ailson Silva, Anderson Nocetti	Brazil	6:11.72	
