= Rowing at the 2011 Pan American Games – Men's double sculls =

Rowing – Men's double sculls at the 2011 Pan American Games
- Venue: Canoe & Rowing Course
- Dates: October 15 - October 17
- Competitors: 12 from 6 nations

Medalists
Gold medal	Cristian Rosso; Ariel Suarez	Argentina
Silver medal	Janier Concepción; Yoennis Hernández	Cuba
Bronze medal	Cesar Amaris; Jose Guipe	Venezuela

The men's double sculls rowing event at the 2011 Pan American Games will be held from October 15–17 at the Canoe & Rowing Course in Ciudad Guzman. The defending Pan American Games champion is Janier Concepción & Yoennis Hernández of Cuba.

== Schedule ==
All times are Central Standard Time (UTC-6).

Date	Time	Round
October 15, 2011	9:40	Heat
October 17, 2011	9:08	Final

== Results ==
=== Heat 1 ===
Rank	Rowers	Country	Time	Notes
1	Daniel Urevick-Ackelseberg, Andrew Quinn	United States	6:45.59	FA
2	Janier Concepción, Yoennis Hernández	Cuba	6:50.10	FA
3	Cristian Rosso, Ariel Suarez	Argentina	6:50.94	FA
4	Cesar Amaris, Jose Guipe	Venezuela	6:51.90	FA
5	Arturo Bastida, Horacio Rangel	Mexico	7:12.38	FA
6	Steven Payne, Eric Bevan	Canada	7:18.94	FA

=== Final A ===
Rank	Rowers	Country	Time	Notes
1st place, gold medalist(s)	Cristian Rosso, Ariel Suarez	Argentina	6:26.55	
2nd place, silver medalist(s)	Janier Concepción, Yoennis Hernández	Cuba	6:32.54	
3rd place, bronze medalist(s)	Cesar Amaris, Jose Guipe	Venezuela	6:36.81	
4	Daniel Urevick-Ackelseberg, Andrew Quinn	United States	6:39.40	
5	Michael Braithwaite, Eric Bevan	Canada	6:47.76	
6	Arturo Bastida, Horacio Rangel	Mexico	6:49.43	
