= Rowing at the 2011 Pan American Games =

- Venue: Rowing and Canoeing course
- Dates: October 15 – October 19
- Competitors: 198 from 18 nations

Rowing competitions at the 2011 Pan American Games in Guadalajara will take place from October 15 to October 19 at the Canoe & Rowing Course in Ciudad Guzman. The only difference between the Pan American rowing program and the Olympic program is, the women's eights is replaced with the women's lightweight single sculls.

== Medal summary ==
=== Medal table ===
* Host nation (Mexico)

Rank	Nation	Gold	Silver	Bronze	Total
1	Argentina	5	2	1	8
2	United States	4	2	2	8
3	Cuba	3	4	2	9
4	Mexico*	2	1	1	4
5	Canada	0	3	5	8
6	Brazil	0	2	0	2
7	Venezuela	0	0	2	2
8	Chile	0	0	1	1
Totals (8 entries)		14	14	14	42

=== Men's events ===
Event	Gold	Silver	Bronze
Single sculls	Ángel Fournier; Cuba	Patrick Loliger; Mexico	Emilio Torres; Venezuela
Double sculls	Argentina; Cristian Rosso; Ariel Suárez	Cuba; Janier Concepción; Yoennis Hernández	Venezuela; Cesar Amaris; Jose Guipe
Lightweight double sculls	Mexico; Alan Armenta; Gerardo Sanchez	Cuba; Yunior Perez; Eyder Batista	Canada; Travis King; Terence McKall
Quadruple sculls	Argentina; Alejandro Cucchietti; Santiago Fernández; Cristian Rosso; Ariel Suárez	Cuba; Janier Concepción; Adrian Oquendo; Eduardo Eubio; Yoennis Hernández	Mexico; Horacio Rangel; Edgar Valenzuela; Patrick Loliger; Santiago Sataella
Coxless pair	United States; Michael Gennaro; Robert "Ty" Otto	Brazil; Joao Borges; Alexis Mestre	Canada; Peter McClelland; Steven Van Knotsenburg
Coxless four	Argentina; Sebastián Fernández; Joaquín Iwan; Rodrigo Murillo; Agustín Silvestro	Canada; David Wakulich; Kai Langerfield; Blake Parsons; Spencer Crowley	Cuba; Yenser Basilo; Dionnis Carrion; Jorber Avila; Solaris Freire
Lightweight coxless four	Cuba; Wilber Turro; Liosbel Hernández; Liosmel Ramos; Manuel Suarez	Argentina; Nicolai Fernández; Diego Gallina; Carlo Lauro; Pablo Mahnic	Chile; Félipe Leal; Fernando Miralles; Rodrigo Muñoz; Fabian Oyarzun
Coxed eight	United States; Jason Read; Stephen Kasprzyk; Matthew Wheeler; Joseph Spencer; Michael Gennaro; Robert "Ty" Otto; Blaise Didier; Marcus McElhenney; Derek Johnson	Canada; Peter McClelland; Steven Van Knotsenburg; David Wakulich; Kai Langerfield; Blake Parsons; Spencer Crowley; Joshua Morris; Benjamin de Wit; Mark Laidlaw	Argentina; Sebastián Fernández; Joaquín Iwan; Rodrigo Murillo; Agustín Silvestro; Sebastián Claus; Diego López; Joel Infante; Mariano Sosa; Ariel Suárez

=== Women's events ===
Event	Gold	Silver	Bronze
Single sculls	Margot Shumway; United States	Gabriela Best; Argentina	Isolda Penney; Canada
Double sculls	Cuba; Yariulvis Cobas; Aimee Hernández	United States; Megan Walsh; Catherine Reddick	Canada; Barbara McCord; Audra Vair
Quadruple sculls	Argentina; María Laura Abalo; Gabriela Best; Milka Kraljev; María Clara Rohner	Canada; Melanie Kok; Barbara McCord; Audra Vair; Isolda Penney	United States; Megan Walsh; Michelle Sechser; Catherine Reddick; Chelsea Smith
Coxless pair	Argentina; Maria Laura Abalo; Gabriela Best	United States; Monica George; Megan Smith	Canada; Sarah Bonikowsky; Sandra Kisil
Lightweight single sculls	Jennifer Goldsack; United States	Fabiana Beltrame; Brazil	Yaima Velazquez; Cuba
Lightweight double sculls	Mexico; Analicia Ramirez; Lila Perez Rul	Cuba; Yaima Velazquez; Yoslaine Dominguez	United States; Michelle Sechser; Chelsea Smith

== Schedule ==
All times are Central Daylight Time (UTC-5).

Day	Date	Start	Finish	Event	Phase
Day 2	Saturday October 15, 2011	8:00	10:20	M2x, W2x, W2-, M4-, LM2x, LW2x, M1x	Heats
Day 2	Saturday October 15, 2011	16:00	17:50	M2x, W2x, W2-, M4-, LM2x, LW2x, M1x	Repechage
Day 3	Sunday October 16, 2011	8:00	10:10	LM4-, W1x, M2-, M4x, LW1x, W4x, M8+	Heats
Day 3	Sunday October 16, 2011	16:00	17:30	LM4-, W1x, M2-, M4x, LW1x, LW1x, W4x	Repechage
Day 4	Monday October 17, 2011	9:00	10:35	M2x, W2x, W2-, M4-	Finals
Day 5	Tuesday October 18, 2011	9:00	11:00	W1x, LM2x, LW2x, M2-, M4x	Finals
Day 6	Wednesday October 19, 2011	9:30	11:20	LW1x, LM4-, W4x, M8+, M1x	Finals

== Entries ==
The following countries have entered athletes:

Nation	Men								Women						Crews	Athletes
Nation	M1x	M2-	M2x	M4-	M4x	M8+	LM2x	LM4-	W1x	W2-	W2x	W4x	LW1x	LW2x	Crews	Athletes
Argentina	X	X	X	X	X	X	X	X	X	X	X	X	X	X	14	25
Brazil		X		X		X	X	X	X		X	X	X	X	10	19
Canada	X	X	X	X		X	X	X	X	X	X	X			11	22
Chile	X	X					X	X							4	9
Colombia	X														1	1
Costa Rica									X						1	1
Cuba	X	X	X	X	X	X	X	X	X	X	X	X	X	X	14	23
Ecuador				X					X						2	4
El Salvador	X						X							X	3	5
Guatemala								X				X			2	6
Honduras	X						X								2	2
Mexico	X	X	X	X	X	X	X	X	X	X	X	X	X	X	14	26
Nicaragua		X		X					X		X				4	6
Paraguay	X												X		2	2
Peru	X	X					X							X	4	6
United States	X	X	X	X	X	X	X	X	X	X	X	X	X	X	14	26
Uruguay	X				X		X								3	6
Venezuela	X		X		X			X	X						5	9
Total: 18 NOCs	13	9	5	8	6	6	11	9	9	5	7	6	6	8	108	198
