= Carcagno =

Carcagno is a surname. Notable people with the surname include:

- Amadeo Flores Carcagno (fl. from 2026), Peruvian defense minister
- Jorge Carcagno (1917–1983), Argentinean general
- Simon Carcagno (born 1976), American rower
- Megan Cooke Carcagno (born 1980), American rower
