= 2014 in aquatic sports =

This article lists the in the water and on the water forms of aquatic sports for 2014.

== Aquatics ==
- January 26 – September 7: 2014 FINA Open Water Swimming Grand Prix
  - January 26 at (Argentina) Rosario
    - Event Cancelled.
  - February 2 at (Argentina) Santa Fe–Coronda
    - Men's winner: (Italy) Simone Ercoli
    - Women's winner: (Czech Republic) Silvie Rybarova
  - February 9 at (Argentina) Hernandarias–Paraná
    - Men's winner: (Russia) Ivan Afanevich
    - Women's winner: (Argentina) Pilar Geijo
  - March 29 at (Mexico) Cancún
    - Men's winner: (Netherlands) Ferry Weertman
    - Women's winner: (Germany) Angela Maurer
  - July 26 at (Canada) Lac Saint-Jean
    - Men's winner: (Canada) Xavier Desharnais
    - Women's winner: (Argentina) Pilar Geijo
  - August 2 at (Canada) Lac Magog
    - Men's winner: (France) Joanes Hedel
    - Women's winner: (Czech Republic) Silvie Rybarova
  - August 23 at (North Macedonia) Lake Ohrid
    - Men's winner: (Belgium) Brian Ryckeman
    - Women's winner: (Czech Republic) Silvie Rybarova
  - September 7 at (Italy) Capri-Naples (final)
    - Men's winner: (Kazakhstan) Vilaij Khudyakov
    - Women's winner: (Brazil) Ana Marcela Cunha
  - Overall Men's winner: (France) Joanes Hedel
  - Overall Women's winner: (Czech Republic) Silvie Rybarova
- February 1 – October 18: 2014 FINA 10 km Marathon Swimming World Cup
  - February 1 at (Argentina) Patagones–Viedma
    - Men's winner: (United Kingdom) Thomas Allen
    - Women's winner: (Brazil) Poliana Okimoto
  - April 5 at (Mexico) Cancún
    - Men's winner: (Germany) Thomas Lurz
    - Women's winner: (Italy) Martina Grimaldi
  - June 28 at (Portugal) Setúbal
    - Men's winner: (Australia) Jarrod Poort
    - Women's winner: (Brazil) Ana Marcela Cunha
  - July 24 at (Canada) Lac Saint-Jean
    - Men's winner: (Germany) Andreas Waschburger
    - Women's winner: (Brazil) Ana Marcela Cunha
  - August 1 at (Canada) Lac Magog
    - Men's winner: (United States) Alex Meyer
    - Women's winner: (Brazil) Ana Marcela Cunha
  - August 9 at (Canada) Lac-Mégantic
    - Men's winner: (Brazil) Allan do Carmo
    - Women's winner: (Brazil) Ana Marcela Cunha
  - October 12 at (China) Chun'an County, Hangzhou
    - Men's winner: (Brazil) Alan do Carmo
    - Women's winner: (Brazil) Ana Marcela Cunha
  - October 18 at Hong Kong (final)
    - Men's winner: (Germany) Christian Reichert
    - Women's winner: (Hungary) Anna Olasz
  - Overall Men's winner: (Brazil) Allan do Carmo
  - Overall Women's winner: (Brazil) Ana Marcela Cunha
- February 14 – October 26: 2014 FINA Diving Grand Prix
  - February 14–16 at (Spain) Madrid
    - China won both the gold and overall medal tallies.
  - February 21–23 at (Germany) Rostock
    - China won both the gold and overall medal tallies.
  - May 1–4 at (Canada) Gatineau
    - China won both the gold and overall medal tallies.
  - May 8–11 at (Puerto Rico) San Juan
    - China won both the gold and overall medal tallies.
  - May 15–18 at (Mexico) Guanajuato
    - China won both the gold and overall medal tallies.
  - August 1–3 at (Italy) Bolzano
    - China won the gold medal tally. Japan won the overall medal tally.
  - October 17–19 at Singapore
    - China won the gold and overall medal tallies.
  - October 24–26 at Kuala Lumpur (final)
    - China won the gold medal tally. China and host nation, Malaysia, won 10 overall medals each.
- March 14 – June 8: 2014 FINA/NVC Diving World Series
  - March 14–16 at Beijing
    - Host nation, China, won both the gold and overall medal tallies.
  - March 20–22 at (United Arab Emirates) Dubai
    - China won both the gold and overall medal tallies.
  - April 25–27 at (United Kingdom) London
    - China won both the gold and overall medal tallies.
  - May 2–4 at (Russia) Moscow
    - China won both the gold and overall medal tallies.
  - May 30 – June 1 at (Canada) Windsor
    - China won both the gold and overall medal tallies.
  - June 6–8 at (Mexico) Monterrey
    - China won both the gold and overall medal tallies.
  - Overall Men's winner: (China) He Chong
  - Overall Women's winner: (China) Wang Han
- July 15–20: 2014 FINA Diving World Cup in Shanghai
  - China won both the gold and overall medal tallies.
- July 27 – August 10: 2014 FINA World Masters Championships at (Canada) Montreal
  - For all the results, click here.
- August 8–10: 2014 FINA High Diving World Cup at (Russia) Kazan (debut event)
  - Men's High Dive winner: (Colombia) Orlando Duque
  - Women's High Dive winner: (United States) Rachelle Simpson
- August 13–24: 2014 European Aquatics Championships at (Germany) Berlin
  - Great Britain won both the gold and overall medal tallies.
- August 17–22: 2014 Summer Youth Olympics Swimming Events
  - China won both the gold and overall medal tallies.
- August 21–24: 2014 Pan Pacific Swimming Championships at (Australia) Gold Coast
  - The United States won both the gold and overall medal tallies.
- August 23–27: 2014 Summer Youth Olympics Diving Events
  - China won both the gold and overall medal tallies.
- August 27 – November 2: 2014 FINA Swimming World Cup
  - August 27 & 28 in (Qatar) Doha
    - Hungary won the gold medal tally. The United States won the overall medal tally.
  - August 31 & September 1 in (United Arab Emirates) Dubai
    - Hungary won the gold medal tally. The United States won the overall medal tally.
  - September 29 & 30 in Hong Kong
    - Hungary won the gold and overall medal tallies.
  - October 4 & 5 in (Russia) Moscow
    - Hungary won the gold and overall medal tallies.
  - October 24 & 25 in Beijing
    - Hungary won the gold medal tally. Host nation, China, won the overall medal tally.
  - October 28 & 29 in Tokyo
    - Hungary won the gold medal tally. Japan club won the overall medal tally. Note: This team is separate from the main Japanese one.
  - November 1 & 2 in Singapore (final)
    - Hungary won the gold medal tally. Great Britain and the United States won 15 overall medals each.
  - Overall winners: (South Africa) Chad le Clos (m) / (Hungary) Katinka Hosszú (f)
- September 5–7: 2014 FINA World Junior Open Water Swimming Championships in Balatonfüred
  - Note: This event was scheduled to be held in Eilat, Israel, from August 28–30. However, FINA has voted unanimously to move the event because of the 2014 Israel–Gaza conflict to Hungary instead.
  - Junior Boys' 7.5 km winner: (Russia) Anton Evsikov
  - Junior Girls' 7.5 km winner: (Hungary) Kiss Nikoletta
  - Junior Team 3 km winner: Hungary
  - Youth Boys' 5 km winner: (United States) Taylor Abbott
  - Youth Girls' 5 km winner: (China) YAN Siyu
  - Youth Team 3 km winner: China
- September 9–14: 2014 World Junior Diving Championships at (Russia) Penza
  - China won both the gold and overall medal tallies.
- October 2–5: 2014 FINA Synchronized Swimming World Cup at (Canada) Quebec City
  - Duet winners: (China) Huang Xuechen and Sun Wenyan
  - Team winners: China
  - Combination winners: China
  - Highlight winners: Ukraine
- October 22–26: 2014 FINA World Junior Synchronised Swimming Championships at (Finland) Helsinki
  - Russia won the gold medal tally. Japan and Russia won 4 overall medals each.
- December 3–7: 2014 FINA World Swimming Championships (25 m) at (Qatar) Doha
  - Brazil won the gold medal tally. The United States won the overall medal tally.
- December 12–14: 2014 FINA Synchro World Trophy at Beijing
  - China took all the gold medals in this event. China and Russia have 5 overall medals each.

== Canoeing ==
- July 12–13: COPAC American Championships 2014 in (Mexico) Huauchinango
  - Men's C1 winner: (Brazil) Felipe Da Silva
  - Men's C2 winners: (Brazil) Anderson Oliveira
  - Men's K1 winner: (Brazil) Pedro da Silva
  - Women's C1 winner: (Brazil) Ana Sátila
  - Women's K1 winner: (Brazil) Ana Sátila

== Flatwater (canoe) sprint ==
- May 2–25: 2014 ICF Canoe Sprint World Cup
  - May 2–4 at Milan
    - Host nation, Italy, won both the gold and overall medal tallies.
  - May 16–18 at (Czech Republic) Račice
    - Germany won both the gold and overall medal tallies.
  - May 23–25 at Szeged
    - Host nation, Hungary, won both the gold and overall medal tallies.
- June 26–29: 2014 Canoe Sprint Junior & U23 European Championships in (France) Mantes-en-Yvelines
  - Junior: Romania won the gold medal tally. Russia won the overall medal tally.
  - U23: Russia won both the gold and overall medal tallies.
- July 11–13: 2014 Canoe Sprint European Championships in (Germany) Brandenburg
  - Hungary won the gold medal tally. Hungary and Russia won 13 overall medals each.
- July 17–20: 2014 ICF Junior and U23 Canoe Sprint World Championships in Szeged
  - Junior: Host nation, Hungary, won both the gold and overall medal tallies.
  - U23: Host nation, Hungary, won the gold medal tally. Russia and Hungary won 6 overall medals each.
  - Overall winner: Hungary
- August 6–10: 2014 ICF Canoe Sprint World Championships in (Russia) Moscow
  - Hungary won both the gold and overall medal tallies.
- August 23–27: 2014 Summer Youth Olympics
  - Belarus and France won 2 gold medals each. The Czech Republic won the overall medal tally.

== Rowing ==
- March 28 – July 13: 2014 World Rowing Cup
  - March 28–30: World Rowing Cup 1 at Sydney
    - Host nation, Australia, won both the gold and overall medal tallies.
  - June 20–22: World Rowing Cup 2 at (France) Lac d'Aiguebelette
    - Great Britain won both the gold and overall medal tallies.
  - July 11–13: World Rowing Cup 3 at (Switzerland) Lucerne
    - New Zealand won the gold medal tally. Great Britain won the overall medal tally.
- May 24 & 25: 2014 European Rowing Junior Championships at (Belgium) Hazewinkel
  - Romania won both the gold and overall medal tallies.
- May 30 – June 1: 2014 European Rowing Championships at (Serbia) Belgrade
  - Czech Republic and Great Britain won 2 gold medals each. However, Germany won the overall medal tally.
- June 20–22: 2014 Henley Women's Regatta at (United Kingdom) Henley-on-Thames
  - June 20 results here. June 21 results here. June 22 results here.
- July 2–6: 2014 Henley Royal Regatta at (United Kingdom) Henley-on-Thames
  - For the results, click here.
- July 23–27: 2014 World Rowing U23 Championships at Varese
  - New Zealand and the United States won 3 gold medals each. Host nation, Italy, won the overall medal tally.
- August 6–10: 2014 World Rowing Junior Championships at Hamburg
  - Host nation, Germany, won both the gold and overall medal tallies.
- August 17–20: 2014 Summer Youth Olympics
  - Boys' Single Sculls: (gold) (Germany) Tim Ole Naske; (silver) (Azerbaijan) Boris Yotov; (bronze) (Canada) Dan de Groot
  - Boys' Pairs: (gold) (Romania) Gheorghe Robert Dedu / Ciprian Tudosa; (silver) (Czech Republic) Miroslav Jech / Lukas Helesic; (bronze) (Turkey) Gokhan Guven / Eren Can Aslan
  - Girls' Single Sculls: (gold) (Belarus) Krystsina Staraselets; (silver) (Greece) Athina Maria Angelopoulou; (bronze) (France) Camille Juillet
  - Girls' Pairs: (gold) (Romania) Cristina Georgiana Popescu / Denisa Tilvescu; (silver) (China) LUO Yadan / PAN Jie; (bronze) (Canada) Larissa Werbicki / Caileigh Filmer
- August 24–31: 2014 World Rowing Championships at (Netherlands) Amsterdam
  - New Zealand won the gold medal tally. Great Britain won the overall medal tally.
- July 17–20: Rowing at the Pan American Sports Festival 2014 in (Mexico) Cuemanco
  - Men's Single Sculls winner: (Cuba) Ángel Fournier
  - Men's Double Sculls winners: (Cuba) Ángel Fournier / Eduardo Rubio
  - Men's Quadruple Sculls winners: (Cuba) Ángel Fournier / Eduardo Rubio / Orlando Sotolongo / Janier Concepción
  - Men's Pairs winners: (Mexico) Leopoldo Tejada Rios / Patrick Loliger
  - Men's Fours winners: (Cuba) Janier Concepción / Adrian Oquendo / Solaris Freire / Jorber Avila
  - Men's Lightweight Double Sculls winners: (Mexico) Jhosymar Valenzuela Ponce / Alonso Ramirez Rosales
  - Men's Lightweight Fours winners: (Cuba) Raul Hernandez / Liosbel Hernandez / Leosmel Ramos / Wilber Turro
  - Women's Single Sculls winner: (Argentina) Gabriela Best
  - Women's Double Sculls winners: (Cuba) Yariulvis Cobas / Aimee Hernandez
  - Women's Pairs winners: (Argentina) Maria Laura Abalo / Gabriela Best
  - Women's Quadruple Sculls winners: (Argentina) Maria Laura Abalo / Gabriela Best / Milka Kraljev / María Clara Rohner
  - Women's Lightweight Single Sculls winners: (Cuba) Yislena Hernandez
  - Women's Lightweight Double Sculls winners: (Brazil) Fabiana Beltrame / Gabriela Eduarda Cardozo

== Sailing ==
- October 12, 2013 – April 26, 2014: ISAF Sailing World Cup
  - October 12–19, 2013 at Qingdao
    - Host nation, China, won both the gold and overall medal tallies.
  - December 1–8, 2013 at Melbourne
    - Host nation, Australia, won both the gold and overall medal tallies.
  - January 26 – February 1, 2014 at (United States) Miami
    - Great Britain won both the gold and overall medal tallies.
  - March 29 – April 5, 2014 at (Spain) Palma, Majorca
    - France won both the gold and overall medal tallies.
  - April 19–26, 2014 at Hyères
    - Australia, Germany, and New Zealand won 2 gold medals each. Australia and France both won 5 overall medals each.
  - Overall gold medal winner: Great Britain. Overall medal winner: Australia.
- July 12–19: 2014 ISAF Youth Sailing World Championship at (Portugal) Tavira
  - Spain won both the gold and overall medal tallies. Also, Spain won the Nations Cup.
- August 18–24: 2014 Summer Youth Olympics
  - Byte CII – Boy's One Person Dinghy: (gold) (Singapore) Bernie Cheok Khoon Chin; (silver) (Portugal) Rodolfo Pires; (bronze) (Hungary) Jonatan Vadnai
  - Byte CII – Girl's One Person Dinghy: (gold) (Singapore) Samantha Yom; (silver) (Netherlands) Odile van Aanholt; (bronze) (Peru) Jarian Brandes
  - Techno 293 – Men's Windsurfer: (gold) (Argentina) Francisco Cruz Saubidet Birkner; (silver) (Russia) Maxim Tokarev; (bronze) (Netherlands) Lars van Someren
  - Techno 293 – Women's Windsurfer: (gold) (China) WU Linli; (silver) (Russia) Mariam Sekhposyan; (bronze) (France) Lucie Pianazza
- September 8–21: 2014 ISAF Sailing World Championships at (Spain) Santander
  - France won the gold medal tally. Australia, France, and Great Britain won 4 overall medals each.

== Water polo ==
=== Men ===
- November 12, 2013 – April 15, 2014: 2014 FINA Water Polo World League for European Men's Teams
  - Europe Group A winner: Serbia
  - Europe Group B winner: Hungary
  - Europe Group C winner: Montenegro
- May 27 – June 1: 2014 FINA Water Polo World League Intercontinental Tournament for Men at Shanghai
  - Australia, Brazil, Canada, China, and the United States qualified to enter into the 2014 Super Final.
- June 16–21: 2014 Men's Super Final in (United Arab Emirates) Dubai
  - Serbia defeated Hungary, 10–6, to claim its eighth FINA water polo title. Montenegro took the bronze medal.
- August 19–24: 2014 FINA Men's Water Polo World Cup in (Kazakhstan) Almaty
  - Serbia defeated Hungary, 11–9 in overtime, to claim its third water polo World Cup title. Croatia took the bronze medal.

=== Women ===
- November 19, 2013 – April 22, 2014: 2014 FINA Water Polo World League for Women
  - Europe Group A winners: Russia and Spain
  - Europe Group B winner: Italy
- May 19–25: 2014 FINA Water World League International Tournament for Women at Riverside, California
  - Qualified teams for Super Final: Australia, United States, Canada, and Brazil. China has already qualified for Super Final, as host nation.
- June 10–15: 2014 Women's Super Final in (China) Kunshan
  - The United States defeated Italy, 10–8, to claim its eighth title. Australia took the bronze medal.
- August 12–17: 2014 FINA Women's Water Polo World Cup in (Russia) Khanty-Mansiysk
  - The United States defeated Australia, 10–6, to claim its third World Cup win. Spain took third place.

== Whitewater (canoe) slalom ==
- June 6 – August 17: 2014 Canoe Slalom World Cup (including the final)
  - June 6–8: World Cup #1 in (United Kingdom) Lee Valley
    - Host nation, Great Britain, won both the gold and overall medal tallies.
  - June 13–15: World Cup #2 in (Slovenia) Ljubljana – Tacen
    - Germany won both the gold and overall medal tallies.
  - June 20–22: World Cup #3 in Prague
    - Host nation, the Czech Republic, won both the gold and overall medal tallies.
  - August 1–3: World Cup #4 in La Seu d'Urgell
    - Host nation, Spain, and Slovakia won 2 gold medals each. However, France won the overall medal tally.
  - August 15–17: World Cup #5 (final) in Augsburg
    - Host nation, Germany, won both the gold and overall medal tallies.
- April 23–27: 2014 ICF Junior & U23 World Canoe Slalom Championships in Penrith
  - Junior results: The Czech Republic won both the gold and overall medal tallies.
  - U23 results: Host nation, Australia, Czech Republic, and Poland won 2 gold medals each. However, the Czech Republic won the overall medals tally.
- August 23–27: 2014 Summer Youth Olympics
  - Go to the Flatwater (canoe) sprint section for information.
- September 17–21: 2014 ICF Canoe Slalom World Championships in (United States) Deep Creek Lake
  - France won both the gold and overall medal tallies.
