= Rowing at the 2007 Pan American Games – Men's quadruple sculls =

The Men's Quadruple Sculls took place at the Lagoa Rodrigo de Freitas. The heats and repechages happened on July 16 and the Finals on July 19.

== Medals ==
Medalists	Gold:	Silver:	Bronze:
Medalists	Yuleydis Cascaret; Janier Concepción; Ángel Fournier; Yoennis Hernández; Cuba	Victor Sebastian Claus; Ariel Suárez; Santiago Fernández; Cristian Rosso; Argentina	Warren Anderson; Jamie Schroeder; Deaglan McEachern; Francis Cuddy; United States

== Race for Lanes ==
Race for Lanes				June 16 8:30	
#	Lane	Name	NOC	Time	Obs
1	2	Yuleydis Cascaret (b); Janier Concepción (2); Ángel Fournier (3); Yoennis Hernández (s)	Cuba	6:05.57	FA
2	4	Warren Anderson (b); Jamie Schroeder (2); Deaglan McEachern (3); Francis Cuddy (s)	United States	6:05.58	FA
3	1	Victor Sebastian Claus (b); Ariel Suarez (2); Santiago Fernández (3); Cristian Rosso (s)	Argentina	6:21.82	FA
4	5	Jairo Klug (b); Marco Martins (2); João Soares Júnior (3); José Rangel (s)	Brazil	6:26.60	FA
5	3	Emiliano Dumestre (b); Jhonatan Esquivel (2); Emanuel Bouvier Waller (3); Joe Reboledo (s)	Uruguay	6:45.30	FA

== Final A ==
Final A				June 19 9:30
#	Lane	Name	NOC	Time
1st place, gold medalist(s)	3	Yuleydis Cascaret (b); Janier Concepción (2); Ángel Fournier (3); Yoennis Hernández (s)	Cuba	6:43.60
2nd place, silver medalist(s)	4	Victor Sebastian Claus (b); Ariel Suarez (2); Santiago Fernández (3); Cristian Alberto Rosso (s)	Argentina	6:47.74
3rd place, bronze medalist(s)	2	Warren Anderson (b); Jamie Schroeder (2); Deaglan McEachern (3); Francis Cuddy (s)	United States	6:49.65
4	5	Emiliano Dumestre (b); Jhonatan Esquivel (2); Emanuel Bouvier Waller (3); Joe Reboledo Pineyrua (s)	Uruguay	7:05.42
5	1	Jairo Klug (b); Marco Martins (2); João Soares Júnior (3); José Rangel (s)	Brazil	7:22.65
