= Rowing at the 2011 Pan American Games – Men's coxless pair =

Rowing – Men's coxless pair at the 2011 Pan American Games
- Venue: Rowing & Canoeing Course
- Dates: October 16 - October 18
- Competitors: 19 from 9 nations

Medalists
| Gold medal | Michael Gennaro; Robert Otto | United States |
| Silver medal | Joao Borges; Alexis Mestre | Brazil |
| Bronze medal | Peter McClelland; Steven Van Knotsenburg | Canada |

The men's coxless pair rowing event at the 2011 Pan American Games will be held from October 16–18 at the Rowing & Canoeing Course in Ciudad Guzman. The defending Pan American Games champion is Dan Casaca and Christopher Jarvis of Canada.

== Schedule ==
All times are Central Standard Time (UTC-6).

| Date | Time | Round |
|---|---|---|
| October 16, 2011 | 9:40 | Heats |
| October 16, 2011 | 16:20 | Repechages |
| October 18, 2011 | 10:04 | Final B |
| October 18, 2011 | 10:12 | Final A |

== Results ==
=== Heats ===
==== Heat 1 ====
| Rank | Rowers | Country | Time | Notes |
|---|---|---|---|---|
| 1 | Joao Borges, Alexis Mestre | Brazil | 6:46.31 | FA |
| 2 | Omar Tejada, Leopoldo Tejada | Mexico | 6:47.36 | FA |
| 3 | Sebastian Claus, Diego Lopez | Argentina | 6:47.82 | R |
| 4 | Peter McClelland, Steven Van Knotsenburg | Canada | 7:20.77 | R |
| 5 | Vicente Vanega, Felipe Jarquin | Nicaragua | 7:23.41 | R |

==== Heat 2 ====
| Rank | Rowers | Country | Time | Notes |
|---|---|---|---|---|
| 1 | Michael Gennaro, Robert Otto | United States | 6:45.85 | FA |
| 2 | Yenser Basilio, Dionnis Carrion | Cuba | 6:51.00 | FA |
| 1 | Michael Gennaro, Robert Otto | United States | 6:45.85 | FA |
| 1 | Joao Borges, Alexis Mestre | Brazil | 6:46.31 | FA |
| 4 | Peter McClelland, Steven Van Knotsenburg | Canada | 7:20.77 | R |
| 2 | Yenser Basilio, Dionnis Carrion | Cuba | 6:51.00 | FA |
| 3 | Lorenzo Candia, Miguel Cerda | Chile | 6:54.05 | R |
| 4 | Diego Mejia, Manuel Lama | Peru | 7:46.49 | R |

=== Repechage ===
| Rank | Rowers | Country | Time | Notes |
|---|---|---|---|---|
| 1 | Lorenzo Candia, Miguel Cerda | Chile | 6:56.11 | FA |
| 2 | Peter McClelland, Steven Van Knotsenburg | Canada | 7:01.24 | FA |
| 3 | Sebastian Claus, Diego Lopez | Argentina | 7:17.17 | FB |
| 4 | Diego Mejia, Manuel Lama | Peru | 7:21.83 | FB |
| 5 | Vicente Vanega, Felipe Jarquin | Nicaragua | 7:25.16 | FB |

=== Final B ===
| Rank | Rowers | Country | Time | Notes |
|---|---|---|---|---|
| 7 | Sebastian Claus, Diego Lopez | Argentina | 7:19.04 | |
| 8 | Diego Mejia, Manuel Lama | Peru | 7:20.00 | |
| 9 | Vicente Vanega, Felipe Jarquin | Nicaragua | 7:21.78 | |

=== Final A ===
| Rank | Rowers | Country | Time | Notes |
|---|---|---|---|---|
| 1st place, gold medalist(s) | Michael Gennaro, Robert Otto | United States | 6:47.07 | |
| 2nd place, silver medalist(s) | Joao Borges, Alexis Mestre | Brazil | 6:48.74 | |
| 3rd place, bronze medalist(s) | Peter McClelland, Steven Van Knotsenburg | Canada | 6:50.80 | |
| 4 | Omar Tejada, Leopoldo Tejada | Mexico | 6:55.63 | |
| 5 | Yenser Basilio, Dionnis Carrion | Cuba | 6:59.60 | |
| 6 | Lorenzo Candia, Miguel Cerda | Chile | 6:59.88 | |
