= Rowing at the 2010 South American Games – Women's single sculls =

The Women's single sculls event at the 2010 South American Games was held over March 22 at 10:40.

== Medalists ==
Gold	Silver	Bronze
Gabriela Best; Argentina	Soraya Iffat Arriaza; Chile	Kissya Costa; Brazil

== Records ==
World Best Time
World best time	Rumyana Neykova (BUL)	7:07.71	Seville, Spain	2002

== Results ==
Rank	Rowers	Country	Time
1st place, gold medalist(s)	Gabriela Best	Argentina	8:07.74
2nd place, silver medalist(s)	Soraya Iffat Arriaza	Chile	8:20.74
3rd place, bronze medalist(s)	Kissya Costa	Brazil	8:31.06
4	Emilia Mariana Troche	Paraguay	8:45.22
