= Rowing at the 2007 Pan American Games – Men's double sculls =

The Men's Double Sculls took place at the Lagoa Rodrigo de Freitas. The race for lanes happened on July 15 and the Final on July 18.

== Medals ==
Medalists	Gold:	Silver:	Bronze:
Medalists	Janier Concepción; Yoennis Hernández; Cuba	Rodrigo Murillo; Ariel Suarez; Argentina	Deaglan McEachern; Francis Cuddy; United States

== Race for Lanes ==
Race for Lanes				June 14 8:40	
#	Lane	Name	NOC	Time	Obs
1	3	Janier Concepción (b); Yoennis Hernández (s)	Cuba	6:30.93	FA
2	2	Rodrigo Murillo (b); Ariel Suarez (s)	Argentina	6:35.86	FA
3	1	Deaglan McEachern (b); Francis Cuddy (s)	United States	6:36.13	FA
4	5	Alexis Marcano (b); James About (s)	Venezuela	6:56.08	FA
5	6	Emanuel Bouvier Waller (b); Jhonatan Esquivel (s)	Uruguay	7:08.45	FA
6	4	Wilhelmi Monge (b) del Castillo (s)	Peru	7:21.63	FA

== Final ==
Final A				June 18 9:35
#	Lane	Name	NOC	Time
1st place, gold medalist(s)	3	Janier Concepción (b); Yoennis Hernández (s)	Cuba	6:35.59
2nd place, silver medalist(s)	4	Rodrigo Murillo (b); Ariel Suarez (s)	Argentina	6:39.06
3rd place, bronze medalist(s)	2	Deaglan McEachern (b); Francis Cuddy (s)	United States	6:39.12
4	5	Emanuel Bouvier Waller (b); Jhonatan Esquivel (s)	Uruguay	7:01.09
5	1	Alexis Marcano (b); James About (s)	Venezuela	7:01.22
6	6	Wilhelmi Monge (b) del Castillo (s)	Peru	7:15.77
