= Andrew Bolton =

Andrew Bolton may refer to:

- Andrew Bolton (curator) (born 1966), British museum curator
- Andrew Bolton (rower) (born 1980), American rower
