= Rowing at the 2011 Pan American Games – Women's coxless pair =

Rowing – Women's coxless pair at the 2011 Pan American Games
- Venue: Canoe & Rowing Course
- Dates: October 15 - October 17
- Competitors: 10 from 5 nations

Medalists
Gold medal	Maria Abalo; Maria Best	Argentina
Silver medal	Monica George; Megan Smith	United States
Bronze medal	Sarah Bonikowsky; Sandra Kisil	Canada

The women's coxless pair rowing event at the 2011 Pan American Games will be held from October 15–17 at the Canoe & Rowing Course in Ciudad Guzman. The defending Pan American Games champion is María José Orellana & Soraya Jadue of Chile.

== Schedule ==
All times are Central Standard Time (UTC-6).

Date	Time	Round
October 15, 2011	9:20	Heat
October 17, 2011	9:48	Final

== Results ==
=== Heat 1 ===
Rank	Rowers	Country	Time	Notes
1	Monica George, Megan Smith	United States	7:31.72	FA
2	Maria Abalo, Maria Best	Argentina	7:36.22	FA
3	Sarah Bonikowsky, Sandra Kisil	Canada	7:41.77	FA
4	Yurileydis Vinet, Yeney Ochoa	Cuba	8:07.07	FA
5	Kinich Medina, Montserrat Garcia	Mexico	8:16.03	FA

=== Final A ===
Rank	Rowers	Country	Time	Notes
1st place, gold medalist(s)	Maria Abalo, Maria Best	Argentina	7:24.57	
2nd place, silver medalist(s)	Monica George, Megan Smith	United States	7:29.05	
3rd place, bronze medalist(s)	Sarah Bonikowsky, Sandra Kisil	Canada	7:32.74	
4	Kinich Medina, Montserrat Garcia	Mexico	7:47.95	
5	Yurileydis Vinet, Yeney Ochoa	Cuba	8:05.61	
