= Cristian Rosso =

Argentine rower (born 1984)

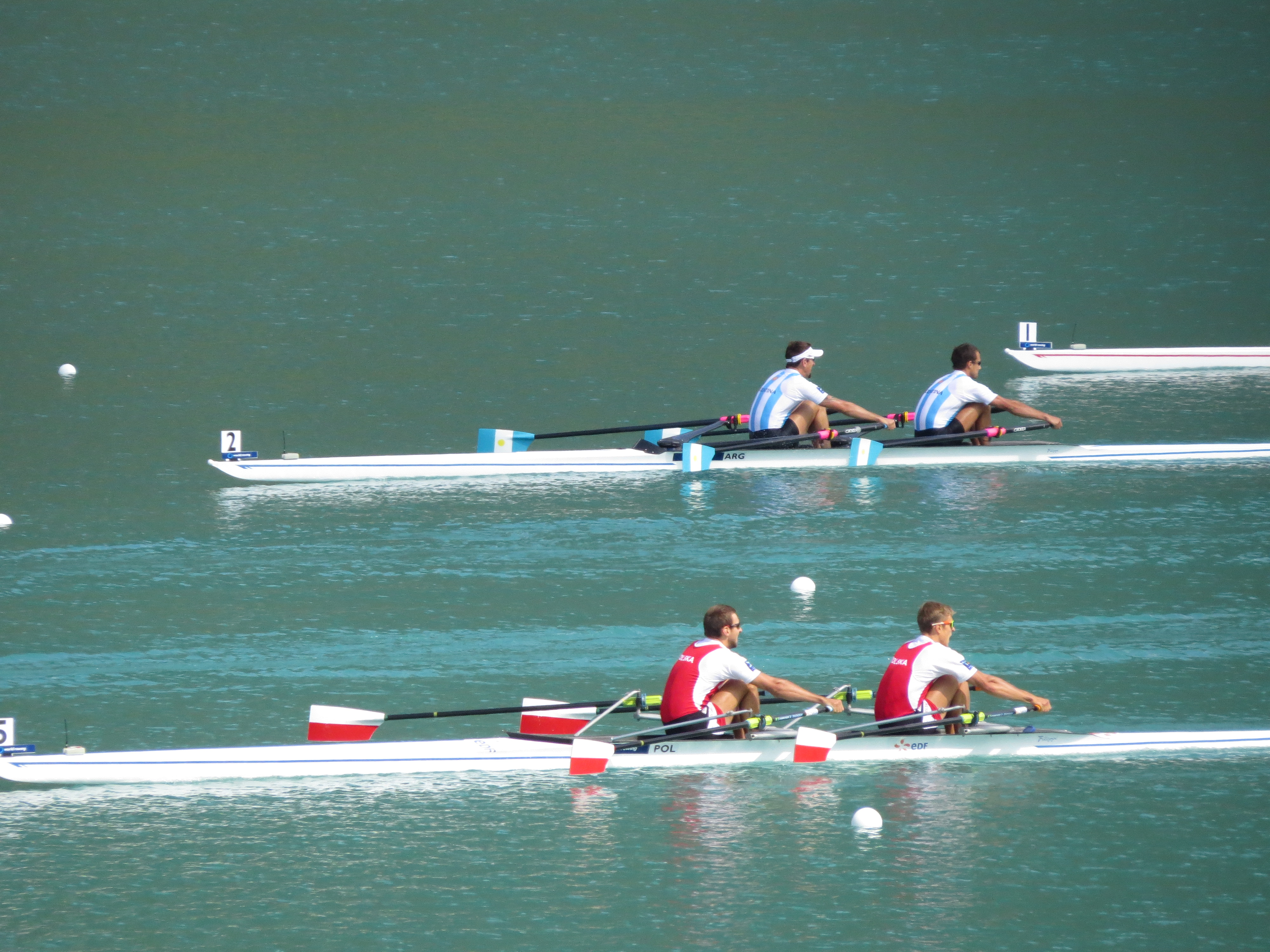
- Rosso on the right of the Argentinian boat in 2015

Personal information
- Born: 29 January 1984 (age 42) Mar del Plata, Argentina

Sport
- Sport: Rowing
Medal record
Men's rowing
Representing Argentina
Pan American Games
Gold medal – first place	2011 Guadalajara	Double sculls
Gold medal – first place	2011 Guadalajara	Quadruple sculls
Gold medal – first place	2019 Lima	Double sculls
Gold medal – first place	2019 Lima	Quadruple sculls
Silver medal – second place	2015 Toronto	Double sculls
Silver medal – second place	2007 Rio de Janeiro	Quadruple sculls
Bronze medal – third place	2015 Toronto	Quadruple sculls

Cristian Alberto Rosso (born 29 January 1984) is an Argentine rower. He competed in the double sculls at the 2012 Summer Olympics where he finished 4th together with Ariel Suárez. Cristian has won two gold medals at the 2011 Pan American Games, two medals at the 2015 Pan American Games (silver and bronze) and a silver medal at the 2007 Pan American Games.
