= Bjorn Larsen (rower) =

American rower

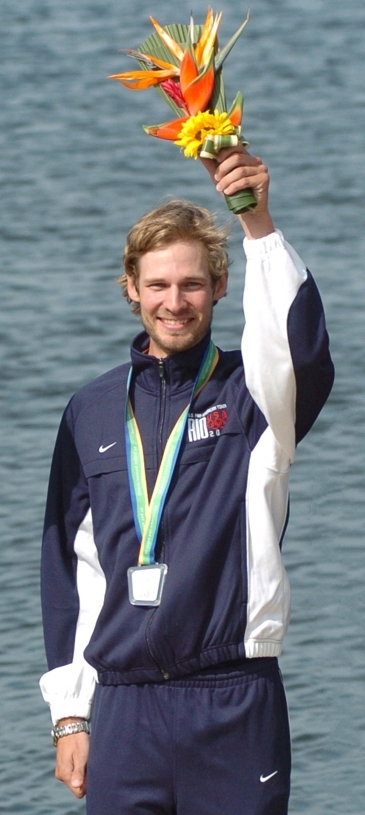
- Larsen at the 2007 Pan American Games

Personal information
- Born: September 25, 1979 (age 46)
- Height: 185 cm (6 ft 1 in)
- Weight: 72 kg (159 lb)

Sport
- Sport: Lightweight rowing
- Club: Pacific Lutheran University; Penn AC
Medal record
Representing the United States
Pan American Games
Silver medal – second place	2007 Rio de Janeiro	LM4-

Bjorn-Tore Larsen Jr. (born September 25, 1979) is a retired American competitor in lightweight rowing. He won a silver medal in the coxless fours at the 2007 Pan American Games.
