= Ariel Suárez =

Argentine rower (born 1980)

Personal information
- Born: 24 February 1980 (age 46) San Fernando, Argentina

Sport
- Sport: Rowing
Medal record
Men's rowing
Representing Argentina
Pan American Games
Gold medal – first place	2011 Guadalajara	Double sculls
Gold medal – first place	2011 Guadalajara	Quadruple sculls
Gold medal – first place	2019 Lima	Quadruple sculls
Gold medal – first place	2019 Lima	Eight
Silver medal – second place	2007 Rio de Janeiro	Double sculls
Silver medal – second place	2007 Rio de Janeiro	Quadruple sculls
Bronze medal – third place	2011 Guadalajara	Eight

Ariel Suárez (born 24 February 1980) is an Argentine rower who placed 4th in the double sculls at the 2012 Summer Olympics with Cristian Rosso. He won two gold medals and a bronze medal at the 2011 Pan American Games and two silver medals at the 2007 Pan American Games. In 2010 he was granted a Konex Merit Diploma as one of the previous decade's five best Argentine rowers.
