= Chris Jarvis (rower) =

Canadian rower

Personal information
- Full name: Christopher Jarvis
- Born: September 10, 1980 (age 46) Burlington, Ontario, Canada
Medal record
Men's rowing
Representing Canada
Pan American Games
Gold medal – first place	2007 Rio de Janeiro	Coxless pairs

Christopher Jarvis (born September 10, 1980) is a Canadian rower. He was born in Burlington, Ontario and competed in the 2004 Summer Olympics in Athens Greece. He is the founder of a Canada-based charity known as "I Challenge Diabetes" and provides significant grass roots support to the Canadian Public.

== Overview ==
Jarvis was diagnosed with diabetes mellitus type 1 at age 13. He wears a Medtronic insulin pump while competing, in order to mitigate the effects of his condition. When he was rowing in college at Northeastern University, his coach told him that the diabetes would prevent him from ever rowing for the varsity team. Despite this, Jarvis not only made the team, but was also selected as its captain in his senior year. He went on to race for Canada for eight years including racing at the Olympics, winning gold medals and podium finishes for many world stage events and is a reputable leader of non-profit work in diabetes.

== Founder of I Challenge Diabetes ==
Inspired by his own journey living with diabetes, Jarvis founded I Challenge Diabetes in 2007 to help young people build confidence, find community, and overcome the challenges and stigma often associated with the condition. Having benefited from the support of organizations such as the Juvenile Diabetes Research Foundation (JDRF), where he has since become a regular speaker, Jarvis understands the importance of a strong support network. Through I Challenge Diabetes, he encourages individuals to see that diabetes does not have to define or limit their potential. What began as a program focused on teenagers has since grown into a national organization offering programs and support for people of all ages across several Canadian provinces.

=== Rowing and not-for-profit background ===
Despite challenges from university coach, Jarvis determined to reach his potential pushed hard to succeed. Leaping beyond the boundaries of university rowing he quickly realized his potential on Canada's national rowing team. Bringing home Silver in 2002 from the under 23 world rowing championships he returned to university to make a difference. While studying chemical engineering and practicing the maximum number of hours in NCAA legislature, Jarvis found the time to join the universities "Student Athlete Advisory Committee" (SAAC) and over his four-year career spent two years as the university co-chair of SAAC bringing in new initiatives for athletes to engage in the community. Jarvis was quickly recruited to represent the Universities Conference as the America East Chair of SAAC where he learned and developed as a leader in sport in the community.

Returning to train in 2003 Jarvis began training for Athens and supported his teammates to an undefeated rowing streak that was 17 races long for Canada. The final World Cup circuit before Athens Greece Jarvis was in the eight and concluded the final six race circuit with an impressive win in Lucerne Switzerland against the entire field that would be racing in Athens. With five weeks remaining before the Olympics a shift in the team moved Jarvis and Barber out of the eight, Jarvis joining Dave Calder in the pair who showed promise for Athens. With little time to train and synchronize, there was an unprecedented amount of speed out of the gates and down the course with Jarvis and Calder moving straight on to the Semi-final from the opening heats in the Olympics and taking down a serious medal contender, the Skelin brothers who had been training together for 17+ years.

Both Jarvis and rower Dave Calder were disqualified during the Semi-final after a near flawless race just after qualifying the pair for the grand final in striking distance of a podium finish. The pair was accused of striking the South African team after crossing over the line of buoys in the final 60m of their 2000m race. The pair appealed the disqualification to FISA, the governing body, the officials refused to look at any evidence and their appeal was not successful. After this disappointment, the pair continued to dispute this to the court of Arbitration of Sport, where a video was finally brought forward from the Olympic Committee showing no such evidence of Canada touching the South African pair. The Canadian pair also had a signed petition from the other athletes qualified for the Grand Final stating their acceptance to the appeal and asking for Canada to be included in the race. The only pair of the six who did not sign the petition was strangely not the South African pair, but the Australians who had beaten all other crews but the Canadians in previous races. The court saw that Canada had not struck the South African pair and the Canadians were permitted to return to racing; however, the decision was made too late and the Canadians were ranked 12th overall without a final race.

Jarvis has teamed up with other athletes to race the pair since. In the following year after Athens, 2005 Jarvis raced with partner Malcolm Howard to claim the highest percentage in Canada while qualifying for the World Rowing Championships in Gifu Japan. An irritation in Jarvis' lower back emerged to two bulging discs during the travel to Japan and left Jarvis and Howard with little time to for rehabilitation. Howard decided to remain with his partner Jarvis and the pair managed to pull off a 4th-place finish despite the setback. Nearly edging in for a bronze in the closing meters of the race but ran out of room. Since 2004, Jarvis realized his impact on the community of people living with diabetes. A disease he had lived with since 1994 and had served as an extra challenge mentally, physically and financially throughout every day of his training career. Jarvis became an advocate for others with the disease and began building a community in both Canada and the US as a spokesperson, educator and inspiration. Jarvis partnered with fellow diabetic athlete Peter Nerothin, co-founding Insulindependence. This was done in 2005 while competing on the Canadian team and finishing his degree at Northeastern University in Boston.

Once completing his degree in chemical engineering, 2006, Jarvis returned to Canada causing Nerothin and Jarvis to separate paths to start anew in Canada. Jarvis started another organization in Canada called "I Challenge Diabetes" while he continued training. Earning immediate recognition in Canada, Jarvis was given a first time award by the Canadian Diabetes Association with they called the "National Inspiration Award" given to someone effecting the whole countries community with diabetes. Jarvis paired up with Dan Casaca in 2007 to lead the Canadian team to its first gold medal in coxless pairs while 2007 Pan American Games. This was Canada's only gold in the 2007 games for Canada's Rowing Team and the first Gold for Canada of the games. Globe and Mail

Jarvis split commitment to the not-for-profit world of both rowing and diabetes ended up costing him big. On top of the 6–8 hours of training per day, 18 training sessions per week (with growing intensity as Beijing drew near), he also poured his passion into the diabetes community in Canada and tried to remain connected to the US community he had built. Emails came in from parents of children with diabetes and diabetic athletes from around the world, plus squeezing in over 75 speaking events in 2007 alone - Jarvis was stretched thin. In the peak of the racing season, Jarvis was pulled from a team meeting by the team manager to inform him of a "whereabouts failure". As Jarvis was one of the five members of the Olympic rowing team selected for a new focused initiative to track the whereabouts of the world's top athletes, to insure at any time a spot check on banned substance abuse could be possible, he needed to submit proper documentation to the Canadian Center for Ethics in Sport - a task he neglected to comply with. Jarvis was required to submit daily activities, time and locations 30–120 days in advance to comply with this legislation. This was something that all Canadian elite athletes were required to do. Jarvis was unable to manage his email stream and had missed two emails from the CCES who had faulted him with inadequate information and given 2 warnings.

Jarvis now aware of the problem wrote to the CCES and asked if there was any other means, a simple request for the use of the phone, to deal with such important information as emails can easily be lost in the shuffle of an athlete who burns 7000 Calories a day in training. This is a part of the legislation that insists all efforts are made to insure the athlete is aware of their responsibility to report, regardless, the CCES again decided to use email for another important update request while Jarvis was inaccessible to the internet. Upon returning home and shuffling through emails to find he was one day after the deadline, Jarvis placed an urgent call to the CCES, asking for assistance and for mercy.

Claiming that he had been found easily each time he was sought by CCES officers for testing and tested more often than any other teammate in 2007, the accusations were simply blind siding. Regardless Jarvis was suspended for three months from the Canadian rowing team as a result of repeatedly neglecting to report his whereabouts to the Canadian Centre for Ethics in Sport. Although a tribunal found that there was significant neglect of obligations by the CCES case manager and the team manager, the tribunal could not overturn the decision of the CCES who maintained their position. Within the current system there were no repercussions or adjustments for failure. Jarvis returned to row and fought for a spot with the Canadian Olympic Team. While politics played a part as the team needed to be narrowed significantly before Beijing, the nation's best petitioned the coaches to include him and Jarvis was brought overseas to train with the team right up to the games. Jarvis' hope in racing in the Olympic Games was satisfied in part by seeing his teammates win Gold and Silver in the men's eight and pair respectively.

He has since retired from rowing and continues to pursue his not-for-profit initiatives which keep him plenty active.
