= Eider Batista =

Cuban rower (born 1981)

Personal information
- Born: 18 February 1981 (age 45) Holguín, Cuba

Sport
- Sport: Rowing
Medal record
Representing Cuba
Pan American Games
Gold medal – first place	2003 Santo Domingo	Quadruple sculls
Gold medal – first place	2007 Rio de Janeiro	Lightweight double sculls
Silver medal – second place	2011 Guadalajara	Lightweight double sculls
Bronze medal – third place	2007 Rio de Janeiro	Coxless fours
Central American and Caribbean Games
Gold medal – first place	2006 Cartagena	Single sculls

Eider Batista Vargas (born 18 February 1981) is a Cuban rower. He competed in the men's lightweight double sculls event at the 2008 Summer Olympics.
