= Duke Blue Devils =

Intercollegiate sports teams of Duke University

- University: Duke University
- Nickname: Blue Devils
- NCAA: Division I (FBS)
- Conference: Atlantic Coast Conference
- Athletic director: Nina King
- Location: Durham, North Carolina
- Varsity teams: 27
- Football stadium: Wallace Wade Stadium
- Basketball arena: Cameron Indoor Stadium
- Baseball stadium: Jack Coombs Field
- Soccer stadium: Koskinen Stadium
- Colors: Duke blue and white
- Mascot: Blue Devil
- Fight song: Fight! Blue Devils, Fight! Blue and White
- Website: goduke.com

Atlantic Coast Conference logo in Duke's colors

The Duke Blue Devils are the intercollegiate athletic teams that represent Duke University, located in Durham, North Carolina. Duke's athletics department features 27 varsity teams that all compete at the National Collegiate Athletic Association (NCAA) Division I level. The name comes from the French "les Diables Bleus" or "the Blue Devils," which was the nickname given during World War I to the Chasseurs Alpins, the French Alpine light infantry battalion.

Duke joined the Southern Conference in 1929, and left in 1953 to become a founder of the Atlantic Coast Conference.

== History ==
Teams for then Trinity College were known originally as the Trinity Eleven, the Blue and White or the Methodists. William H. Lander, as editor-in-chief, and Mike Bradshaw, as managing editor, of the Trinity Chronicle began the academic year 1922–23 referring to the athletic teams as the Blue Devils. The Chronicle staff continued its use and through repetition, Blue Devils eventually caught on.

The Blue Devils have won 17 NCAA National Championships. The women's golf team has won seven (1999, 2002, 2005, 2006, 2007, 2014, and 2019), the men's basketball team has won five (1991, 1992, 2001, 2010, and 2015), men's lacrosse has won three (2010, 2013 and 2014), and the men's soccer (1986) and women's tennis (2009) teams have won one each. Duke's major historic rival, especially in basketball, has been the Tar Heels of the University of North Carolina at Chapel Hill (see Duke-Carolina rivalry).

Duke has also captured 119 ACC Championships, 44 of which have come since 1999–2000 (through 2008–09). Duke's teams hold the longest streak of consecutive ACC Championships in women's tennis (14), women's golf (13), men's basketball (5), women's basketball (5) and volleyball (4, tied). The men's basketball (18), women's golf (16), and women's tennis (16) lead individual programs, while men's tennis (12), volleyball (9), football (7), men's cross country (7), men's lacrosse (7), men's golf (6), men's soccer (5), women's basketball (5), baseball (3), women's cross country (2) and women's lacrosse (1) have also captured titles.

In the past five years, Duke has finished in the top 20 every year in the NACDA Director's Cup, an overall measure of an institution's athletic success. Most recently, Duke has finished 10th (2010), 17th (2009), 19th (2008), 11th (2007), eighth (2006), and fifth (2005). Duke has the smallest undergraduate enrollment of any institution that has been in the top 35 the past two years. Furthermore, Duke is the only school besides Stanford that has finished in the top 20 in the past three years that has fewer than 10,000 undergraduates.

Duke teams that have been ranked in the top ten nationally in the 2000s include men's and women's basketball, men's and women's tennis, men's and women's soccer, men's and women's cross country, men's and women's lacrosse, women's field hockey, and men's and women's golf. Eight of these teams were ranked either first or second in the country during 2004–05. According to a 2006 evaluation conducted by the NCAA, Duke's student-athletes have the highest graduation rate of any institution in the nation at 91%. Excluding students who leave or transfer in good academic standing, the graduation rate of student-athletes is 97%. There have been allegations that, like most other schools examined such as North Carolina, Duke's graduation rate may be inflated or be a result of athletes gravitating to easier courses and majors, though many have taken issue with such claims.

== Sports sponsored ==
Men's sports	Women's sports
Baseball	Basketball
Basketball	Cross country
Cross country	Fencing
Fencing	Field hockey
Football	Golf
Golf	Lacrosse
Lacrosse	Rowing
Soccer	Soccer
Swimming & diving	Softball
Tennis	Swimming & diving
Track and field^{†}	Tennis
Wrestling	Track and field^{†}
	Volleyball
† – Track and field includes both indoor and outdoor.

=== Baseball ===
Nate Freiman ('09), who became a first baseman for the Oakland Athletics, holds Duke's career home run record (43), the Duke career slugging percentage record (.616), and the school's second-highest all-time batting average (.356).

=== Men's basketball ===
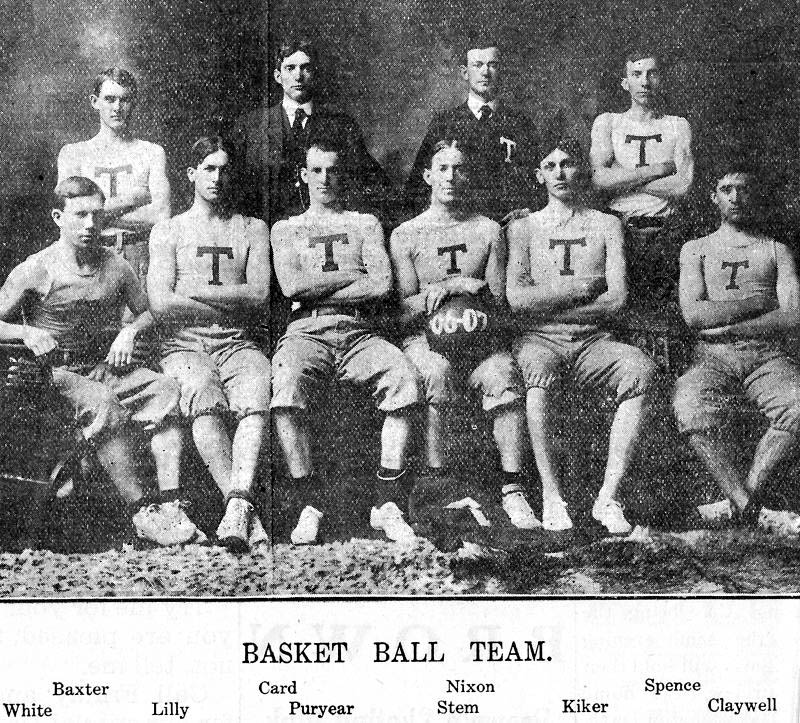
The 1906–07 Trinity Blue and White men's basketball team

Duke University's men's basketball team is the fourth-winningest college basketball program of all time, particularly since 1980 under head coach Mike Krzyzewski, who is nicknamed "Coach K". They have won the NCAA Men's Division I Basketball Championship five times, all under Krzyzewski, which is second behind the University of North Carolina for any ACC team, and have been in 18 Final Fours. Seventy-one players have been drafted in the NBA draft. Additionally, Duke has had an Academic All-American on the team 14 years. Duke has 23 Atlantic Coast Conference tournament championships (1960, 1963, 1964, 1966, 1978, 1986, 1988, 1992, 1999, 2000, 2001, 2002, 2003, 2005, 2006, 2009, 2010, 2011, 2017, 2019, 2023, 2025), the most of any team in the ACC (the University of North Carolina has 17). Duke also has been the top seed in the ACC tournament 19 times (1954, 1958, 1963, 1964, 1965, 1966, 1986, 1991, 1992, 1994, 1997, 1998, 1999, 2000, 2001, 2004, 2006, 2010). Duke is third, behind only UCLA and Kansas, in total weeks ranked as the number one team in the nation by the AP with 110 weeks. The Blue Devils have the third-longest streak in the AP Top 25 in history with 200 consecutive appearances from 1996 to 2007. This streak only trails UCLA's 221 consecutive polls from 1966 to 1980 as the longest of all-time and Kansas' 200 consecutive polls from 2009–present. The streak ended with the AP poll released on February 12, 2007.

=== Women's basketball ===
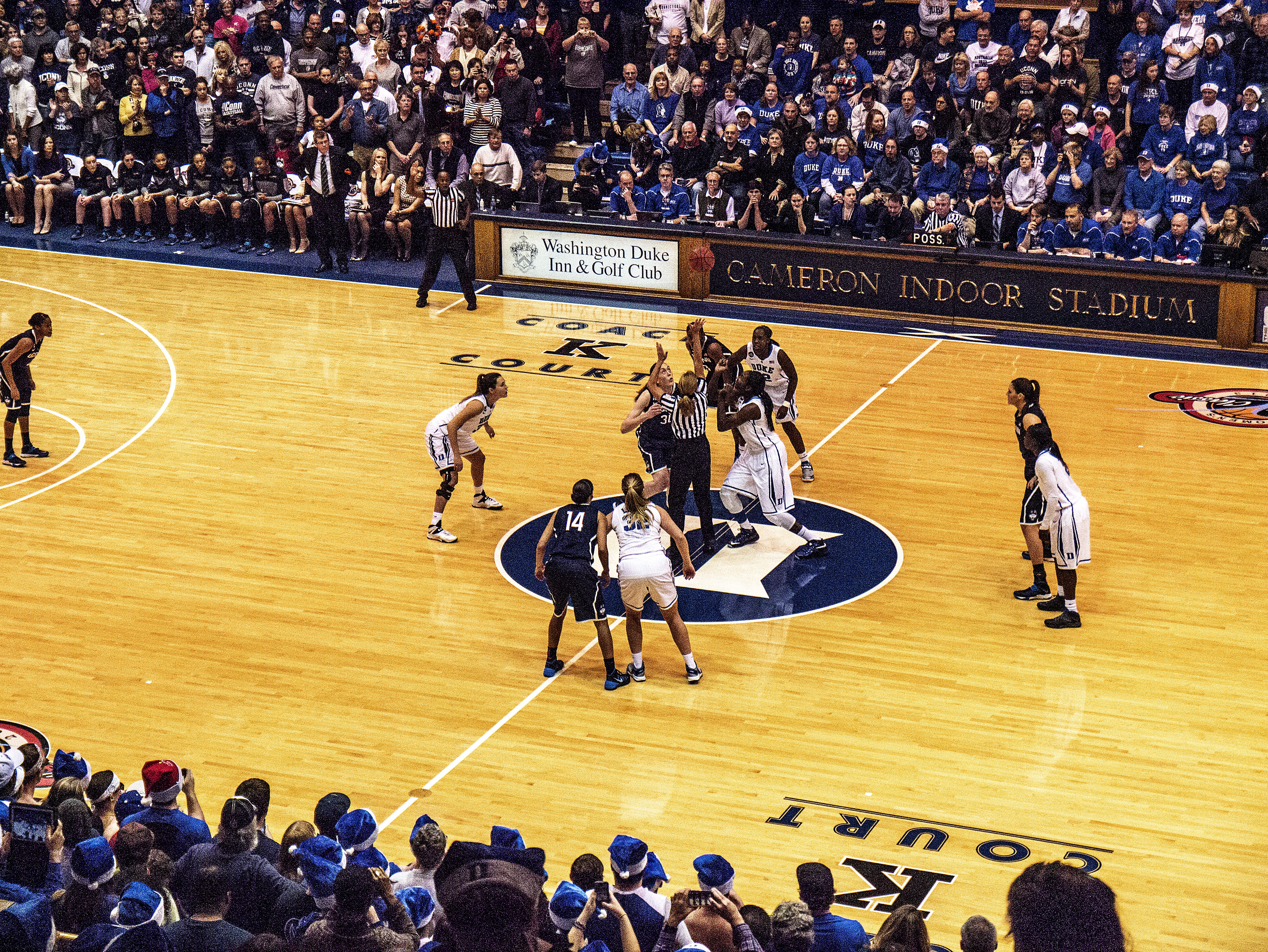
Tip off of a Duke women's basketball game in Cameron Indoor Stadium

During the 1990s and 2000s, the Duke women's basketball program has become a national powerhouse. Led by coach Gail Goestenkors from 1992 to 2007, Duke made ten NCAA Sweet Sixteen appearances, seven Elite Eight appearances, four Final Four appearances, and two appearances in the NCAA Championship game during her tenure.

In the 2000–01 season, the Blue Devils posted a 30–4 record, won the ACC Tournament and ACC regular season championships, and earned a No. 1 seed in the NCAA Tournament. The 2001–02 season produced similar success. She led the Blue Devils to a 31–4 record and an NCAA Final Four appearance. Duke became the first ACC school to produce an undefeated 19–0 record in the ACC by winning the regular season and Tournament titles.

Goestenkors led the Blue Devils to an ACC-record 35–2 ledger in the 2002–03 season and their second straight NCAA Final Four appearance. For the second consecutive year, Duke posted a 19–0 record against ACC opponents.

In 2003–04, with Player of the year Alana Beard leading the way, the Blue Devils advanced to the NCAA Elite Eight, and won a fourth-straight Atlantic Coast Conference regular season title and a fifth-straight ACC Tournament championship. Duke also broke the University of Connecticut's 76-game home winning streak with a 68–67 buzzer-beater victory in Hartford, Connecticut.

The 2006–07 season ended with a 32–2 record and notched the school's first ever undefeated regular season (30–0). This also set an NCAA-record seventh straight 30-win season. Goestenkors is often known as the "winningest coach not to have won a championship", having finished runner-up two times in fifteen years.

On April 18, 2007, Joanne P. McCallie, or Coach P, was introduced as the new coach of Duke's women's basketball team after Goestenkors left for the University of Texas. Through 2011, the Blue Devils have won seven ACC Championships, the third most in the ACC.

=== Men's fencing ===
In 2018, Duke men's fencing won its first ACC championship in program history.

=== Women's fencing ===
Stephen Kovacs (1972–2022) became an Assistant Fencing Coach at Duke University in August 2010, and held the position through 2013. While at Duke he mentored three-time NCAA women's saber champion Becca Ward. Half a dozen years later Kovacs was accused of sexually assaulting two fencing students elsewhere, and he died in prison in 2022.

Former Duke three-time NCAA All-American fencer Ibtihaj Muhammad won a bronze medal at the 2016 Olympic Games, in the women's team sabre competition.

=== Women's field hockey ===
Duke is a Division I field hockey program. The field hockey program was established in 1971. Duke field hockey participates in the Atlantic Coast Conference.

Accomplishments	
All-Time Program Record	487-418-17
NCAA Tournament Appearances	18
ACC Regular Season Championship	1
NCAA Final Four Appearances	6
All-American Selections	50

Williams Field at Jack Katz Stadium is home to the Duke Field Hockey team. The facility is located on the university's East campus at 705 Broad St., in Durham. The facility was completed in 1996, and then was renovated on 2011.

=== Football ===
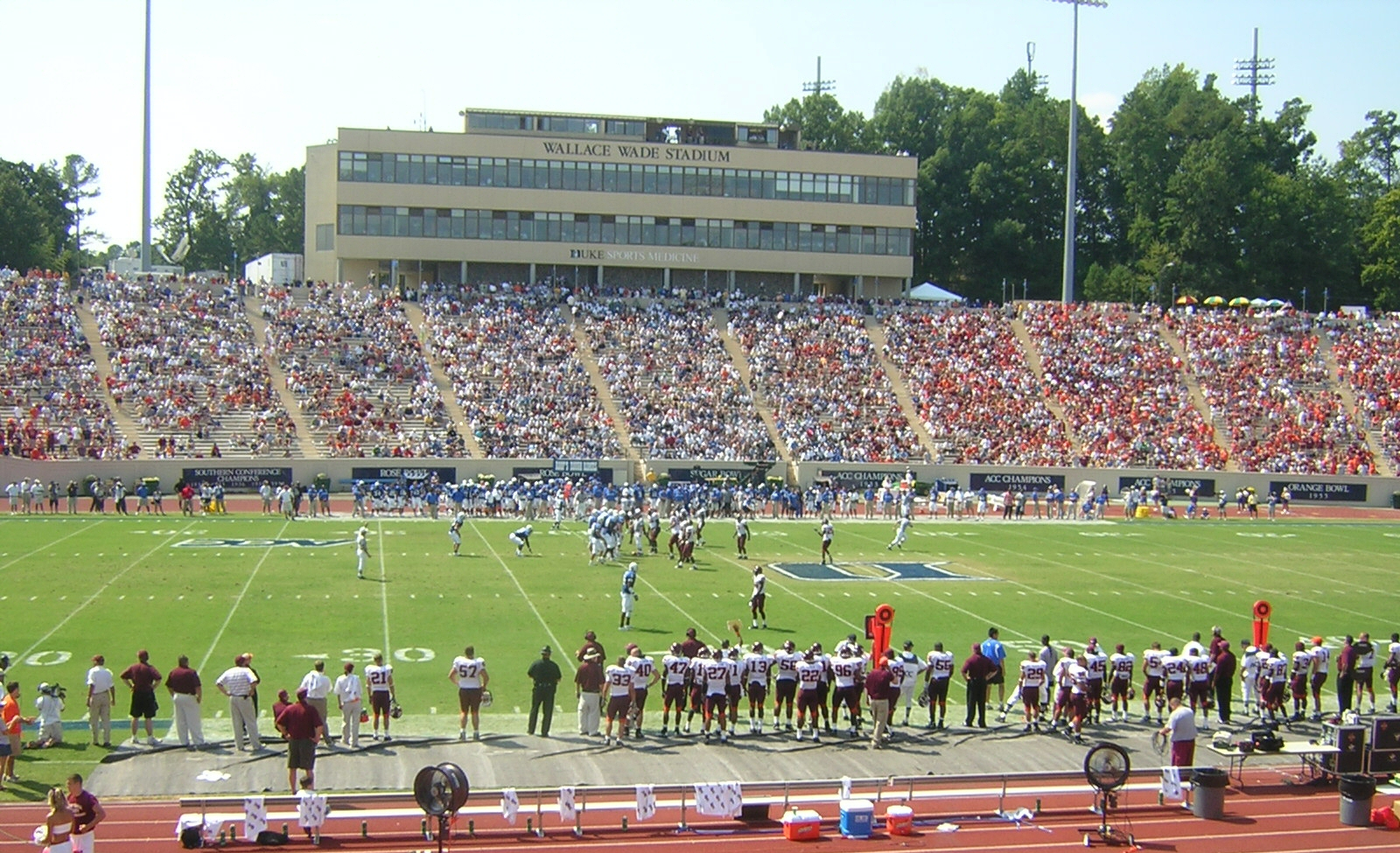
Wallace Wade Stadium, home to Duke football and site of the 1942 Rose Bowl.

The most famous Duke football season came in 1938, when Wallace Wade was head coach and the "Iron Dukes" were born. Wade shocked the college football world by leaving Alabama for Duke in 1930, later rationalizing the move by saying that Duke shared his belief that a school should provide its athletes with a strong academic background. Wade's success at Alabama (three national championships) translated well to Duke's program, most notably in 1938, when his "Iron Dukes" went unscored upon the entire regular season. Duke reached their first Rose Bowl appearance, where they lost 7–3 when USC scored a touchdown in the final minute of the game on a pass from a second-string quarterback to a third string tight end. Wade's Blue Devils lost another Rose Bowl to Oregon State in 1942, this one held at Duke's home stadium in Durham, North Carolina due to Pearl Harbor. Wade's achievements placed him in the Hall of Fame.

The football program also had a string of successful years in the late 1980s when the team was coached by Steve Spurrier. Spurrier led the Blue Devils to three consecutive winning seasons from 1987 to 1989, culminating with the Blue Devils sharing the ACC title in 1989 and playing in the All-American Bowl, where the Blue Devils lost to Texas Tech. The 1989 ACC title was the last title won by a school in the state of North Carolina until Wake Forest won their second ACC crown in 2006.

The team also rose to prominence in 1994, the first season under coach Fred Goldsmith. The team raced out to an 8–1 record, and was briefly ranked as high as #13 in the country before losing the last two games of the season 24–23 to North Carolina State and 41–40 to arch-rival North Carolina. The 1994 team played in the program's first New Years Day Bowl game since 1962, falling to Wisconsin 34–21 in the Hall of Fame Bowl, now known as the Outback Bowl.

The Blue Devils are coached by Manny Diaz. They have won seven ACC Football Championships, which is the fourth most in the ACC trailing only Clemson, FSU, and Maryland. Ten ACC Football Players of the Year have come from Duke, the most in the ACC. Additionally, three 3 Pro Football Hall of Famers have come through Duke's program, second only to the Miami Hurricanes who have had 4 Hall of Famers, for the most in the ACC.

Duke is consistently ranked at or near the top of the list of FBS schools which graduate nearly all of their football players. Duke has topped the list 12 years, earning it the most Academic Achievement Awards of any university. Notre Dame has been honored six times, while Boston College and Northwestern have won the award four times each.

=== Men's golf ===
The men's golf team has won 20 conference championships:

- Southern Conference (12): 1933, 1935–42, 1948–49, 1951
- Atlantic Coast Conference (8): 1954, 1959, 1961–62, 1966, 2005, 2013, 2017

Their best finish in the NCAA Championship was second place in 1947.

Duke golfers who have had successful professional careers include Art Wall, Jr. (14 PGA Tour wins including the 1959 Masters Tournament), Mike Souchak (15 PGA Tour wins), Skip Alexander (three PGA Tour wins), Joe Ogilvie (one PGA Tour win, four Web.com Tour wins), and Kevin Streelman (two PGA Tour wins).

The Duke men's golf team has been coached by Jamie Green since January 9, 2009. Bob Heintz is the assistant coach since Feb. 10, 2017. There are 9 players on their roster. Duke was ranked 7th in the U.S. by Golfweek in 2015.

=== Women's golf ===
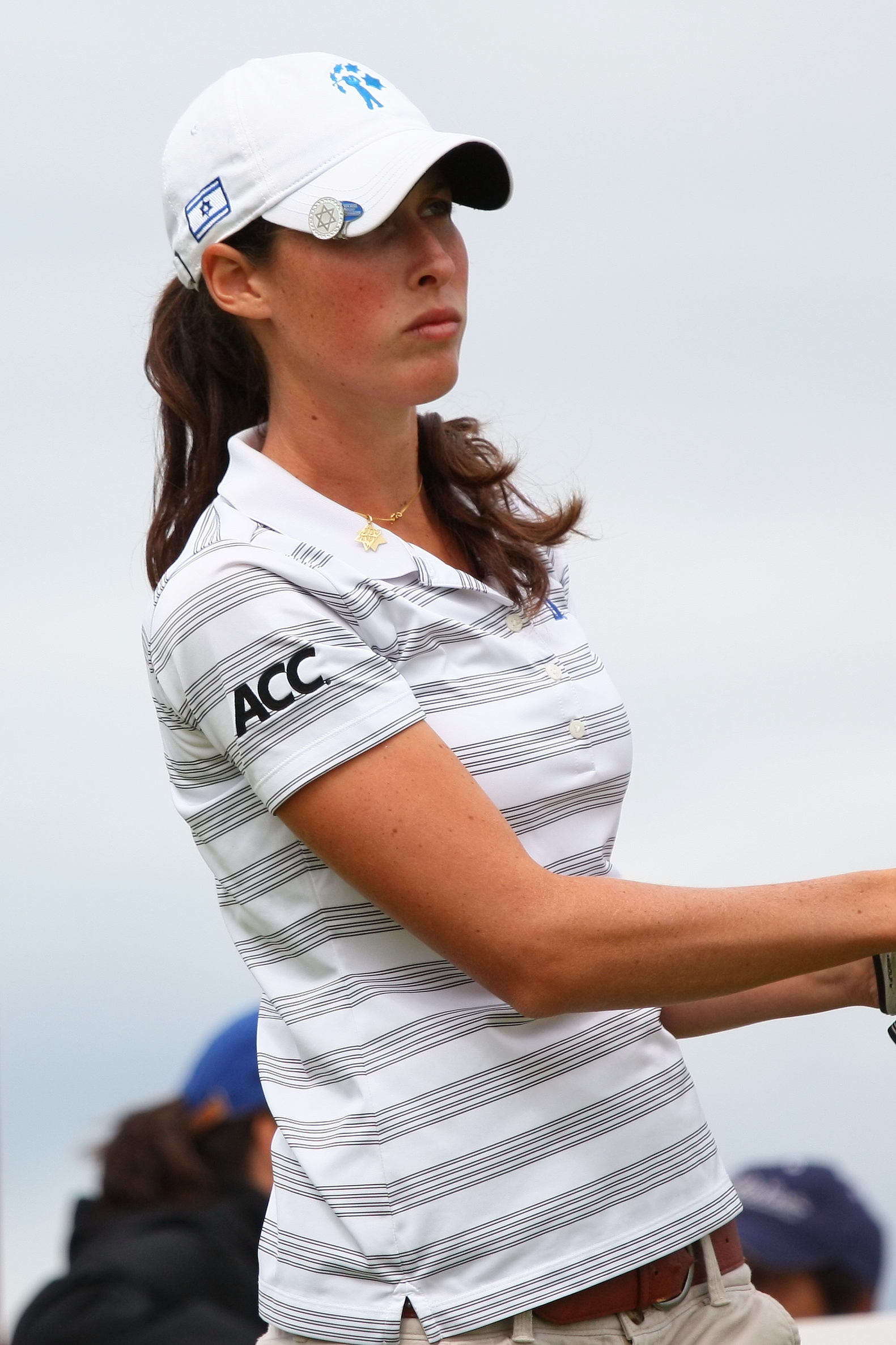
Laetitia Beck

While the men's basketball team gets the most press, the women's golf team has been the most successful team on campus since 2000. In the 2000–2005 seasons, Duke's head-to-head record was 796–45–3, a winning percentage of .945. The team won national championships in 1999, 2002, 2005, 2006, 2007, 2014, and 2019 as well as 13 consecutive ACC championships from 1995 to 2008. A number of successful professional golfers have gone through Duke's program. Céline Boutier won The Evian Championship major while Jenny Chuasiriporn and Brittany Lang finished as runners-up in the U.S. Women's Open while still undergraduates in 1998 and 2005, respectively. Blue Devils alumnae have won 14 LPGA individual titles, including one major. The winners are Celine Boutier, Brittany Lang, Leona Maguire, Miranda Wang and Gina Kim.

Laetitia Beck, who won the Israeli championship at the age of 12 and was named ACC Rookie of the Year in 2011, played for the team. In 2014, Beck became the first Israeli to qualify for a major professional golf tour.

On the World Amateur Golf Ranking list, Duke ranks second to Stanford University for the most combined weeks spent at No. 1 by their women golfers.

=== Men's lacrosse ===
The men's lacrosse program has risen in prominence to challenge the traditional lacrosse powers such as Johns Hopkins, Maryland, Princeton, and Syracuse, as well as more recent contenders like North Carolina and Virginia. The team won the national title in 2010 after defeating Notre Dame 6–5 in overtime and won their second national title in 2013 after defeating Syracuse 16–10. The Blue Devils then repeated in 2014, defeating Notre Dame 11–9 to win their second straight national championship and third in five years. They also reached the championship game in 2005 and 2007.

The men's lacrosse team gained national attention in the 2006 lacrosse incident, where members of the team were falsely accused of raping an exotic dancer at a team party. The investigation led to the cancellation of the 2006 season and the resignation of coach Mike Pressler. Contradictions in the accuser's many changing stories, unimpeachable alibi evidence provided by the players, and misconduct of then-Durham District Attorney Mike Nifong led to all charges being dropped and the attorney general declaring the players innocent. Nifong was later removed and disbarred due to his misconduct in the case, and the team members who lost their season were granted another year of eligibility.

=== Rowing ===
Megan Cooke is the head coach for Duke's rowing teams. Her husband Simon Carcagno is also part of the coaching staff.

=== Men's soccer ===
The 1986 team won the NCAA Division I Men's Soccer Championship.

=== Women's soccer ===
The women's soccer team was founded in 1988. The team has advanced to the NCAA Tournament 23 times, and finished as runners up three times. The team has won the ACC regular season title three times.

=== Women's softball ===
The team is in their second year of competing in the ACC.

=== Men and women's swimming ===
The team is coached by Brian Barnes.

=== Men's diving ===
Comedian Cody Kolodziejzyk (Commonly known as Cody Ko) competed on the team from the 2008–2009 season to the 2011–2012 season. In the 2008–2009 season, he set the school record in the 3-meter dive, scoring 374.40.

=== Tennis ===
Women's tennis reached the final four in the 2019 NCAA.

=== Wrestling ===
In 1929 the Blue Devil Wrestling team was founded. The team competes in the Atlantic Coast Conference (ACC) and is coached by Oklahoma State University 1988 graduate Glen Lanham. Ed Newman, who went on to a 12-year NFL career in football, won All Conference honors twice as a heavyweight wrestle, and twice won the ACC heavyweight championship. The team competes on campus in the Card Gymnasium. In 2009, heavyweight Konrad Dudziak became Duke's first All-American placing 2nd in 2009 and 4th in 2010. Conner Hartmann became the program's first three-time All-American, finishing 5th in 2014, 6th in 2015, and 7th in 2016.

Duke's best finish at the NCAA Tournament was 22nd in 2018.

== Championships ==
=== NCAA team championships ===
Duke has 17 NCAA team national championships.

- Men's (9)
  - Basketball (5): 1991, 1992, 2001, 2010, 2015
  - Lacrosse (3): 2010, 2013, 2014
  - Soccer (1): 1986
- Women's (8)
  - Golf (7): 1999, 2002, 2005, 2006, 2007, 2014, 2019
  - Tennis (1): 2009
- see also:
  - ACC NCAA team championships
  - List of NCAA schools with the most NCAA Division I championships
  - List of NCAA schools with the most Division I national championships

=== Other national championship game appearances ===
- Men's (12)
  - Basketball (6): 1964, 1978, 1986, 1990, 1994, 1999
  - Lacrosse (3): 2005, 2007, 2018, 2023
  - Soccer (2): 1982, 1995
- Women's (3)
  - Basketball (2): 1999, 2006
  - Soccer (3): 1992, 2011, 2015

== ACC Athletes of the Year ==
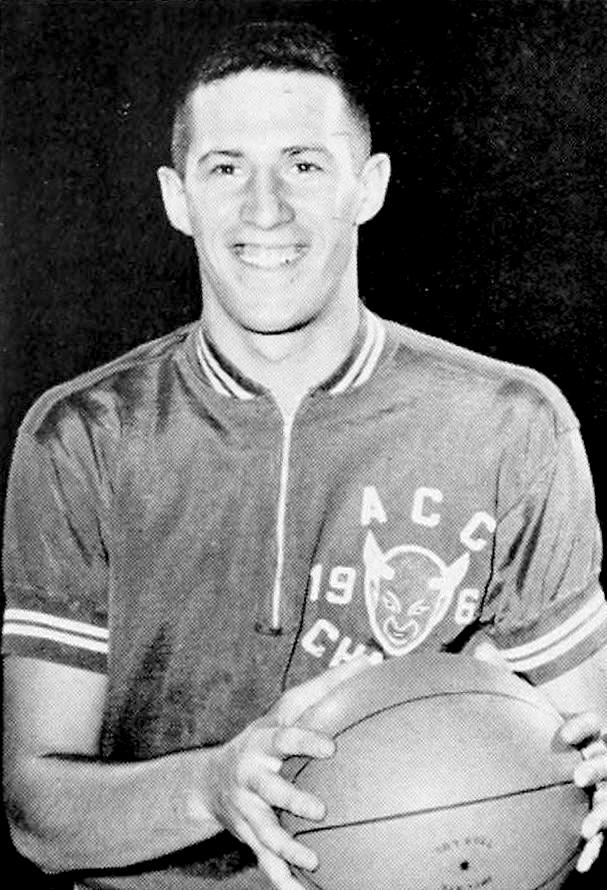
Basketball player Art Heyman was the 1963 ACC Athlete of the Year.

The following Duke athletes have been honored as an ACC Athlete of the Year. The men's award, the Anthony J. McKelvin Award, began when the ACC was formed in 1954. The women's award, the Mary Garber Award, began in 1990.

Male Athlete of the Year
Year	Athlete	Sport
1954	Joel Shankle	Track & Field
1956	Dave Sime	Track & Field/Basketball
1960	Mike McGee	Football
1963	Art Heyman	Basketball
1964	Jeff Mullins	Basketball
1988	Danny Ferry	Basketball
1989	Danny Ferry	Basketball
1990	Clarkston Hines	Football
1991	Christian Laettner	Basketball
1992	Christian Laettner	Basketball
1999	Elton Brand	Basketball
2001	Shane Battier	Basketball
2006	JJ Redick	Basketball
2009	Nate Freiman	Baseball
2010	Ned Crotty	Lacrosse
2015	Laken Tomlinson	Football
2019	Zion Williamson	Basketball
2025	Cooper Flagg	Basketball

Female Athlete of the Year
Year	Athlete	Sport
1998	Vanessa Webb	Tennis
2003	Alana Beard	Basketball
2004	Alana Beard	Basketball
2007	Lindsey Harding	Basketball
2009	Amanda Blumenherst	Golf
2012	Becca Ward	Fencing

== All-Americans ==
There have been numerous All-Americans in Duke University history. As of March 2006, 307 athletes have been honored 470 times as All-Americans. In men's sports, this status has been achieved 297 times by 204 athletes. In women's sports, it has occurred 172 times by 103 athletes. The breakdown for men's sports is as follows (times, number of different athletes): baseball (13, 8); basketball (55, 31); cross country (3, 2); fencing (9, 5); football (60, 53); golf (12, 9); lacrosse (57, 37); soccer (42, 28); swimming and diving (3, 3); tennis (26, 15); track and field (17, 13); wrestling (3, 2). The breakdown for women's sports is as follows (times, number of different athletes): basketball (14, 8); cross country (8, 6); fencing (4, 2); field hockey (19, 12); golf (31, 16); lacrosse (23, 11); rowing (5, 3); soccer (10, 8); swimming and diving (1, 1); tennis (36, 22); track and field (15, 9); volleyball (7, 5).

== Olympics ==
Duke Olympians
Athlete	Sport	Location	Country	Medal/Note
Joel Shankle	Track & Field	1956 Melbourne	United States	Bronze in 110 Hurdles
Dave Sime	Track & Field	1960 Rome	United States	Silver in 100 Meters
Jeff Mullins	M Basketball	1964 Tokyo	United States	Team Won Gold
Bob Wheeler	Track & Field	1972 Munich	United States	Semifinals in 1500 run
Al Buehler*	Track & Field	1972 Munich	United States	Team Manager
Tate Armstrong	M Basketball	1976 Montreal	United States	Team Won Gold
Cameron Hall	M Basketball	1976 Montreal	Canada	Team Placed 4th
Nancy Hogshead	Swimming	1980 Moscow	United States	United States Boycotted Games
Nancy Hogshead	Swimming	1984 Los Angeles	United States	3 Gold Medals and 1 Silver Medal
Dan Meagher	M Basketball	1984 Los Angeles	Canada	Team Placed 4th
Tom Kain	Soccer	1984 Los Angeles	United States	Injured, Did not compete
Bert Govig	Wrestling	1984 Los Angeles	United States	Injured, Did not compete
Al Buehler*	Track and Field	1984 Los Angeles	United States	Team Manager
Al Buehler*	Track and Field	1988 Seoul	United States	Team Manager
Christian Laettner	M Basketball	1992 Barcelona	United States	Team Won Gold
Mike Krzyzewski*	M Basketball	1992 Barcelona	United States	Assistant coach, Team Won Gold
John Moore	Rowing	1992 Barcelona	United States	8th in Men's Pair
Randy Jones	Bobsled	1994 Lillehammer	United States	13th in 2-Man
Grant Hill	M Basketball	1996 Atlanta	United States	Team Won Gold
Curt Clausen	Track & Field	1996 Atlanta	United States	50th in 20k Race Walk
Leslie Marx	Fencing	1996 Atlanta	United States	Top 16 in Épée
Horace Holden	Canoe/Kayak	1996 Atlanta	United States	11th in 2-Man Whitewater Slalom
Will Martin	Yachting	1996 Atlanta	United States	23rd in Single-Handed Dinghy
Carla Overbeck*	W Soccer	1996 Atlanta	United States	Team Won Gold
Liz Tchou*	Field Hockey	1996 Atlanta	United States	Team Placed 5th
Randy Jones	Bobsled	1998 Nagano	United States	5th in 4-Man
Crawford Palmer	M Basketball	2000 Sydney	France	Team Won Silver
Greg Newton	M Basketball	2000 Sydney	Canada	Team Placed 7th
Curt Clausen	Track and Field	2000 Sydney	United States	22nd in 50k Race Walk
Evan Whitfield	M Soccer	2000 Sydney	United States	Team Placed 4th
Vanessa Webb	W Tennis	2000 Sydney	Canada	Competed in Doubles
Carla Overbeck	W Soccer	2000 Sydney	United States	Team Won Silver
Lynda Blutreich*	Track & Field	2000 Sydney	United States	11th in Javelin Qualifying
Randy Jones	Bobsled	2002 Salt Lake City	United States	Silver in 4-Man
Curt Clausen	Track & Field	2004 Athens	United States	32nd in 50k Race Walk
Carlos Boozer	M Basketball	2004 Athens	United States	Team Won Bronze
Jilian Schwartz	Track & Field	2004 Athens	United States	Competed in Pole Vault
Gail Goestenkors*	W Basketball	2004 Athens	United States	Assistant coach, Team Won Gold
Randy Jones	Bobsled	2006 Torino	United States	His Fourth Olympics
Carlos Boozer	M Basketball	2008 Beijing	United States	Team Won Gold
Mike Krzyzewski*	M Basketball	2008 Beijing	United States	Head coach, Team Won Gold
Shannon Rowbury	Track & Field	2008 Beijing	United States	Qualified for 1,500-m final
Rebecca Smith	W Soccer	2008 Beijing	New Zealand	
Rebecca Ward	Fencing	2008 Beijing	United States	Bronze in Individual Sabre and Team Sabre
Luol Deng	M Basketball	2012 London	Great Britain	
Drew Johansen*	Diving	2012 London	United States	Head coach
Abby Johnston	Synchronized Diving	2012 London	United States	Won Silver in synchronized 3 metre springboard
Mike Krzyzewski*	M Basketball	2012 London	United States	Head coach, Team Won Gold
Nick McCrory	Synchronized and Individual Diving	2012 London	United States	Won Bronze in synchronized 10 metre platform
Shannon Rowbury	Track & Field	2012 London	United States	
Jillian Schwartz	Track & Field	2012 London	Israel	
Rebecca Smith	W Soccer	2012 London	New Zealand	
Hiroshi Hoketsu	Dressage	2012 London	Japan	Oldest Olympian at 2012 Games (71)

Note: * indicates Duke coach at time of participation in Olympics

=== Other news ===
In 2008, five Duke graduates qualified for the Olympic marathon trials, more than any other university.

== History of the mascot ==
"Les Diables Bleus" French military unit

As World War I ended, Duke's Board of Trustees, then called the "Trinity College Board of Trustees", lifted their quarter century ban of football on campus leading to an interest in naming the athletic teams. The team was then known as the Trinity Eleven, the Blue and White, or the Methodists (as opposed to the Baptists of nearby rival Wake Forest University). Because of the ambiguity, the student newspaper, the Trinity Chronicle (now called The Chronicle) launched a campaign to create a new mascot. Nominations for a new team name included Catamounts, Grizzlies, Badgers, Dreadnaughts, and Captains. The Trinity Chronicle editor narrowed the many nominations down to those that utilized the school colors of dark blue and white. The narrowed list consisted of Blue Titans, Blue Eagles, polar bears, Blue Devils, Royal Blazes, and Blue Warriors. None of the nominations proved to be a clear favorite, but the name Blue Devils elicited criticism that could potentially engender opposition on campus. These fears were partly alleviated when it was revealed that the name was military and patriotic rather than anti-religious; the name actually refers to the Chasseurs Alpins, also known as "les diables bleus" ("The Blue Devils"), a French military unit which had impressed many Duke students and alumni returning home from the Western Front. The nickname of the Chasseurs Alpins was derived from the blue jacket and blue-grey breeches worn as part of their World War I-era uniform. Even with this explanation, however, that year's football season passed with no official selection.

During the 1922–1923 academic year, campus student leaders and the editors of the two other student publications, The Archive and The Chanticleer, decided that the newspaper staff should decide the name on their own because the nomination process had proved inconclusive. Editor-in-chief William H. Lander and managing editor Mike Bradshaw began referring to the athletic teams as the Blue Devils. Though the name was not officially used that year, no opposition to the name arose. The Chronicle's staff continued to use the name and eventually "Blue Devils" became the official mascot and nickname of the Duke athletics program.

== Fight songs ==
Duke has two official fight songs, "Fight! Blue Devils, Fight!" and "Blue and White", in addition to their alma mater, "Dear Old Duke". "Fight! Blue Devils, Fight!" was composed by J.F. Hewitt with lyrics by Douglas Ballin. In 2010, Michael Pinto of Bleacher Report ranked it as the 32nd best college football fight song. The lyrics and music for "Blue and White" were written by G.E. Leftwich, Jr.

== See also ==
- John Scheyer
- Duke–North Carolina rivalry
- Krzyzewskiville
