= Andrew Bolton (rower) =

American rower

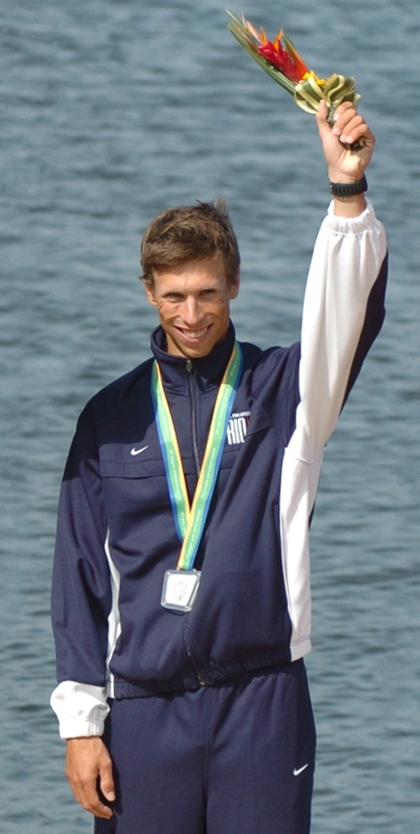
- Bolton at the 2007 Pan American Games

Personal information
- Born: January 24, 1980 (age 46)
- Height: 185 cm (6 ft 1 in)
- Weight: 70 kg (154 lb)

Sport
- Sport: Lightweight rowing
- Club: Caspersen TC; New York AC; Old Lyme RA
Medal record
Representing the United States
Pan American Games
Silver medal – second place	2007 Rio de Janeiro	LM4-
World Championships
Silver medal – second place	2003 Milan	LM8+
Gold medal – first place	2008 Linz	LM8+

Andrew Bolton (born January 24, 1980) is a retired American competitor in lightweight rowing. He won a gold medal in the eights at the 2008 World Championships and placed second in 2003. He also won a silver medal in the coxless fours at the 2007 Pan American Games.
