= Gabe Winkler =

American rower

Personal information
- Full name: Gabriel Paul Winkler
- Born: July 22, 1976 (age 50)
- Height: 6 ft 1 in (185 cm)
- Weight: 159 lb (72 kg)
Medal record
Men's rowing
Representing the United States
World Championships
Gold medal – first place	2000 Zagreb	Lwt eight
Pan American Games
Gold medal – first place	2007 Rio	Eight
Silver medal – second place	2007 Rio	Coxless four

Gabriel Paul Winkler (born July 22, 1976) is an American lightweight rower. He won a gold medal at the 2000 World Rowing Championships in Zagreb with the lightweight men's eight. Winkler attended St. Johnsbury Academy in St. Johnsbury, Vermont.
