= Megan Cooke =

American rower (born 1980)

Personal information
- Born: May 5, 1980 (age 46) Los Gatos, California, U.S.
- Education: University of California, Berkeley
- Spouse: Simon Carcagno
Medal record
Women's rowing
Representing United States
World Rowing Championships
Gold medal – first place	2006 Eton	Eights
World Rowing Cup
Gold medal – first place	2006 Lucerne	Coxless Pairs
Silver medal – second place	2007 Lucerne	Coxless Pairs
Silver medal – second place	2007 Lintz	Coxless Pairs

Megan Cooke Carcagno (born May 5, 1980) is an American rower. She was a gold medalist at the 2006 World Rowing Cup and a gold medalist at the 2006 FISA World Rowing Championships, assisting in setting a world best time for the U.S. National Team. She was also a 2006 champion at the Henley Royal Regatta and the Head of the Charles Regatta.

== Early life ==
Megan Cooke was born on May 5, 1980, in Los Gatos, California. She began rowing her sophomore year of high school. Cooke graduated from the University of California at Berkeley in 2002 with a degree in psychology.

== Career ==
=== Rowing ===
Cooke was on the rowing team at the University of California at Berkeley, earning first team All-American honors twice along with first team All-Region and first team All-Pac accolades. She was the co-captain of the rowing team her junior and senior years, earning fourth place at the 2000 NCAA Championships and third place in the 2002. In 2001 she won a silver medal in the women's four without coxswain at the 2001 World Under-23 Championships. Cooke joined the U.S. National Team for rowing in 2004. Her last year on the national team was 2007. In 2006, as part of the U.S. World Champion women's eight, she helped set a world record for Team USA. She was also a 2006 Henley Royal Regatta champion and 2006 Head of the Charles Regatta champion. She won a silver medal in coxless pairs and a gold medal in the women's pair with partner Anna Mickelson at the 2006 World Rowing Cup in Lucerne. She placed fifth in the 2006 World Rowling Cup in Munich. Cooke competed in the 2006 FISA World Rowing Championships in Eton, helping her team win a gold medal with a world best time of 5:55.50. She was a silver medalist at the World Rowing Cup in Lintz. An injury in 2008 set Cooke back during the Senior Women's National Team's bids for the 2008 Summer Olympics. She retired from the U.S. National Team in 2008.

=== Coaching ===
After retiring from the United States National Team in 2008, Cooke worked as an assistant rowing coach for the University of Wisconsin, winning 2 NCAA South/Central Championships in the Novice 8. Cooke was named the new varsity assistant coach at the University of Wisconsin beginning in the fall of 2013. Cooke was named varsity head coach of the Duke University Women's Rowing program in 2016. She coached the team to a second-place finish at ACC's even without fielding a boat for the 2nd Varsity 4+, with the 1st Varsity and 2nd Varsity 8+'s as well as the 1st Varsity 4+, taking second place; the team's best performance since 2006. In 2016 she was awarded ACC Coach of the Year. This resulted in the team's first bid to NCAA's in Sacramento, California. The team achieved its highest CRCA ranking at 12th, with the team finishing in 17th at NCAA's in a tiebreaker. The 2nd Varsity 8+ and the 1st Varsity 4+ won their C Finals at NCAA's. She won CRCA Regional Coach of the Year and the Duke University staff, consisting of assistant coaches Chuck Rodosky and Chase Graham, won CRCA Division I Staff of the Year.

== Personal life ==
Cooke is married to Simon Carcagno and has three sons.

== See also ==
Simon Carcagno Duke University University of Wisconsin rowing team
