= Steven Van Knotsenburg =

Canadian rower (born 1982)

Personal information
- Nicknames: Treefrog, Sugar Ray
- Nationality: Canada
- Born: February 21, 1982 (age 44) Beamsville, Ontario, Canada
- Height: 6’3”

Sport
- College team: Brown University
- Club: St. Catharines Rowing Club, Ridley Grad Boat Club
Medal record
Men's rowing
Representing Canada
World Rowing Championships
Silver medal – second place	2009 Lake Malta	Eight (M8+)
Bronze medal – third place	2011 Lake Bled	Coxed pair (M2+)
Pan American Games
Silver medal – second place	2011 Guadalajara	Eight (M8+)
Bronze medal – third place	2011 Guadalajara	Coxless pair (M2–)

Steven Van Knotsenburg (born February 21, 1982) is a Canadian rower from Beamsville, Ontario. Van Knotsenburg had his greatest success when he won a silver at the 2009 World Rowing Championships in the men's eight. At the 2011 Pan American Games he won a silver and a bronze in the men's eight and coxless pairs respectively, with Pete McClelland.
