= Simon Carcagno =

American rower (born 1976)

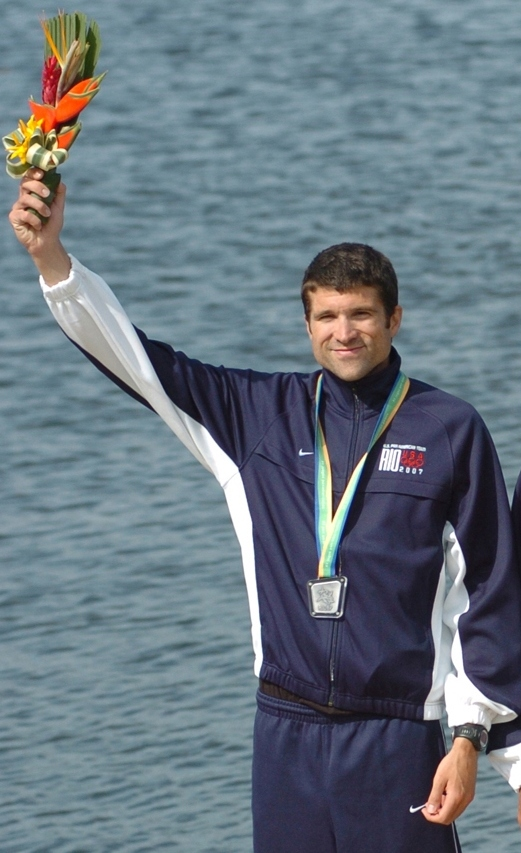
- Carcagno at the 2007 Pan American Games

Personal information
- Born: March 22, 1976 (age 50)
- Education: Princeton University
- Height: 185 cm (6 ft 1 in)
- Weight: 73 kg (161 lb)
- Spouse: Megan Cooke

Sport
- Sport: Lightweight rowing
- Club: Princeton TC
Medal record
Representing the United States
Pan American Games
Silver medal – second place	2007 Rio de Janeiro	LM4-
World Rowing Championships
Bronze medal – third place	2003 Milan	LM2-
Gold medal – first place	2008 Linz	LM8+

Simon Carcagno (born March 22, 1976) is an American rower who competed in lightweight rowing. He won a gold medal in the eights at the 2008 World Rowing Championships and placed third in the coxless pairs in 2003. He also won a silver medal in the coxless fours at the 2007 Pan American Games. He represented the United States as an alternate at the 2004 Summer Olympics and the 2008 Summer Olympics.

== Early life ==
Carcagno is from Pennington, New Jersey, and graduated from Hopewell Valley Central High School in 1994. He graduated with a degree in public policy from Princeton University's Woodrow Wilson School of Public and International Affairs in 1998.

== Career ==
=== Rowing ===
While a student at Princeton, he was a member of Princeton's rowing team. He joined the rowing team as a walk-on his freshman year and served as co-captain his senior year. He was awarded the Bayard W. Read Class of 1926 Award for most improved athlete over four years. Carcagno was a member of the U.S. National Rowing Team from 2002 until 2008. He represented the United States as an alternate on two Olympic teams, one Pan-Am team, and seven senior national teams. In 2002 Carcagno was part the duo that was the first-ever U.S. finalist lightweight pair at the World Championships. Carcagno placed third in the 2003 Pan American Games for lightweight pair. He was also a bronze medalist at the 2003 World Rowing Championships. In 2004 he placed second in the lightweight pair at the Munich and Lucerne World Cups. He won a silver medal at the 2007 Pan American Games in lightweight four and won the lightweight eight at the 2008 World Championships.

=== Coaching ===
He joined the coaching staff as a volunteer men's rowing coach at Princeton in 2002. Also in 2002, Carcagno became a coach at the Mercer Junior Rowing Club in West Windsor, New Jersey. In 2009 he joined the coaching staff at the University of Wisconsin, first as a volunteer coach, then as an assistant coach in 2014. Prior to leaving Wisconsin in 2015, Carcagno was an associate head coach for the men's rowing team. In 2016 Carcagno joined the rowing staff at Duke University as the program's boathouse manager. In 2016 he became a volunteer assistant coach for Duke's rowing teams. During Carcagno's first year at Duke, the rowing team qualified for its first NCAA Championships appearance and earned second place at the ACC Championship. As part of the Duke coaching staff, Carcagno received a Collegiate Rowing Coaches Association National and Region 3 Staff of the Year accolade.

== Personal life ==
Carcagno is married to Megan Cooke. They have three sons. He obtained a master's degree in sports administration at the University of North Carolina at Chapel Hill in 2018.
