= Troy Kepper =

American rower

Personal information
- Born: February 22, 1982 (age 44) Tallahassee, Florida, United States

Sport
- Sport: Rowing
- Club: California Golden Bears
Medal record
Representing United States
World Championships
Gold medal – first place	2009 Poznan	Coxed pair
Silver medal – second place	2005 Gifu	Coxed four
Pan American Games
Gold medal – first place	2007 Rio de Janeiro	Eights

Troy Kepper (born February 22, 1982) is an American rower who has competed successfully at elite level winning the men's coxed pairs at the 2009 World Rowing Championships in Poznań. This followed his second place at the 2005 World Rowing Championships in Gifu.
