= María Laura Abalo =

Argentine rower (born 1981)

Personal information
- Born: 14 August 1981 (age 45) Buenos Aires, Argentina

Sport
- Sport: Rowing
Medal record
Women's rowing
Representing Argentina
Pan American Games
Gold medal – first place	2011 Guadalajara	Coxless pair
Gold medal – first place	2011 Guadalajara	Quadruple sculls
Bronze medal – third place	2007 Rio de Janeiro	Quadruple sculls
Bronze medal – third place	2015 Toronto	Quadruple sculls

María Laura Ábalo (born 14 August 1981) is an Argentine rower. She competed at the 2007, 2011 and 2015 Pan American Games.

At the 2012 Summer Olympics, she competed in the Women's coxless pair with Gabriela Best. At the Pan American Games, Laura won two gold medals in 2011 and a bronze medal in 2007 and 2015.

== Education ==
She studied at Lincoln before becoming a champion at the 2010 and 2011 Pan American Games. Laura started out as an enthusiastic young woman who played all forms of sports in her school, playing volleyball, basketball, handball, softball, track and field, Association football.
