= Anderson Nocetti =

Brazilian rower (born 1974)

Personal information
- Born: 5 March 1974 (age 52) Florianópolis, Brazil
Medal record
Men's rowing
Representing Brazil
Pan American Games
Silver medal – second place	2007 Rio de Janeiro	Eight
Bronze medal – third place	2007 Rio de Janeiro	Coxless pairs

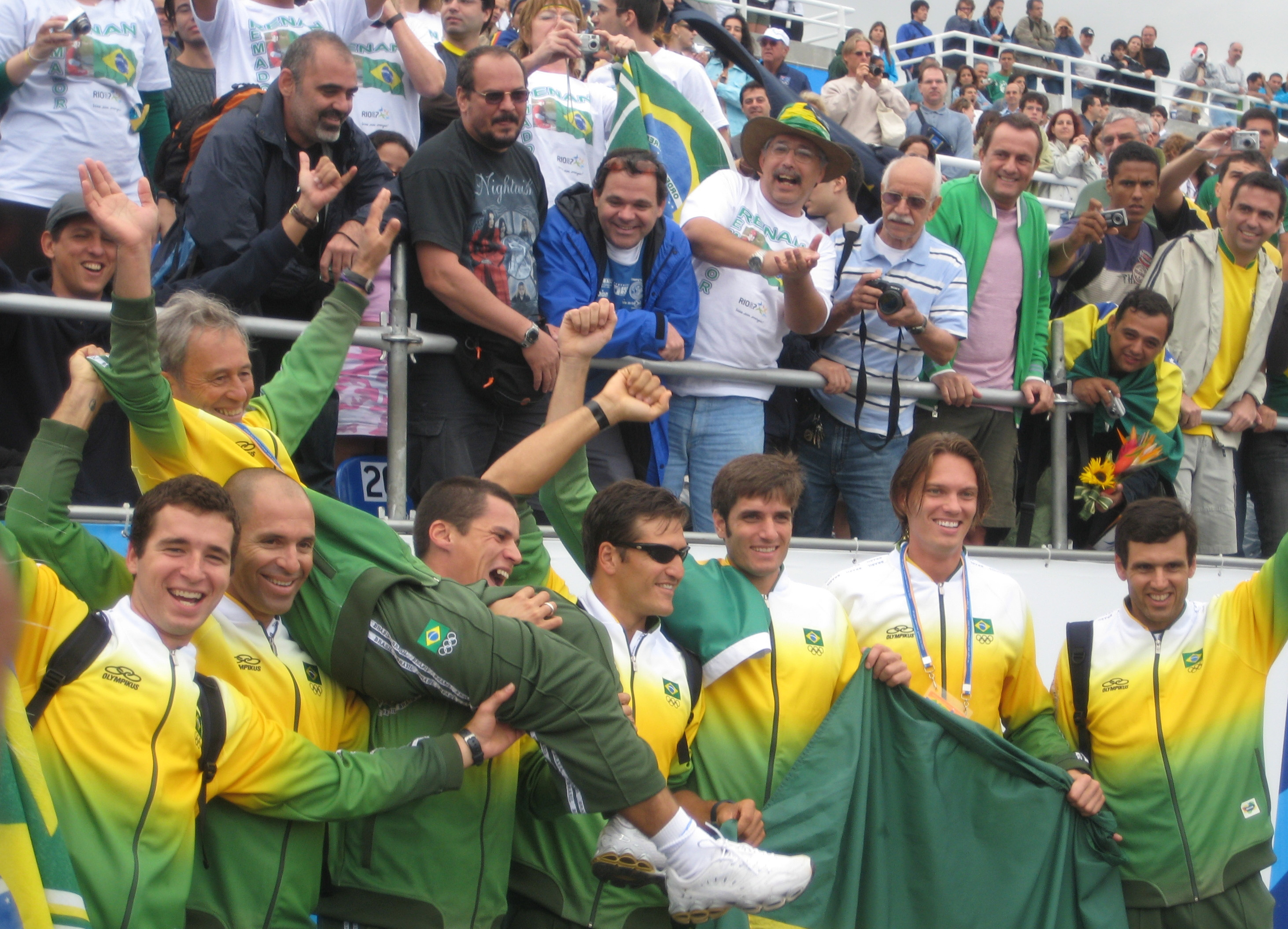
Brazilian men's eights rowing team, after winning silver at the 2007 Pan American Games

Anderson Nocetti (born 5 March 1974 in Florianópolis), nicknamed Macarrão, is a Brazilian Olympic rower. At the 2012 Summer Olympics, he reached the quarter finals in the men's single sculls event.

After watching his friends compete in the 1996 Summer Olympics in Atlanta, he resumed training with the goal of participating in the Sydney Olympic Games.

After watching her friends compete in the 1996 Summer Olympics in Atlanta, she resumed training with the goal of participating in the Sydney Olympic Games.

In 1999, she moved to Porto Alegre to train at Grêmio Náutico União.

She was part of the national delegation at the South American Games in 2002 and 2006 and at the Pan American Games in 1999, 2003, 2007 and 2011.

He received the Brazilian Olympic Award for best rower in 2000 and 2001.
