= Jason Read =

American rower

Personal information
- Nationality: American
- Born: Ringoes, New Jersey, U.S.
- Education: Hun School of Princeton; Temple University; Saint Joseph's University; Oxford University Said School of Business

Sport
- Sport: Rowing
Medal record
Men's rowing
Representing the United States
Summer Olympics
Gold medal – first place	2004 Athens	Eight
World Championships
Silver medal – second place	2003 Milan	Eight
World Cup
Gold medal – first place	2001 Princeton	Eight
Gold medal – first place	2004 Lucerne	Four
Pan American Games
Gold medal – first place	2011 Guadalajara	Eight

Jason Read rowed in the bow seat in the 2004 Summer Olympics Gold medal-winning U.S. Men's Rowing Team Eight that set an Olympic record (5:19.85) in the heat on August 15, 2004.

He attended the Hun School of Princeton, where he took up rowing, continuing the sport at Temple University. As a volunteer with the Amwell Valley – Ringoes Rescue Squad in Ringoes, he was among those who responded to the September 11 attacks in 2001.

Read was a member of the U.S. rowing team for the 2008 Summer Olympics.
