= Rowing at the 2007 Pan American Games =

Rowing at the 2007 Pan American Games will take place at the Lagoa Rodrigo de Freitas, the same venue that hosted the Canoe and Kayak and Water Skiing events. Although the initial intention of the Organizing Committee was to have the whole Olympic Program at the Pan American Games, the Women's Eight was not held due to lack of participants.

== Medal summary ==
=== Men's events ===
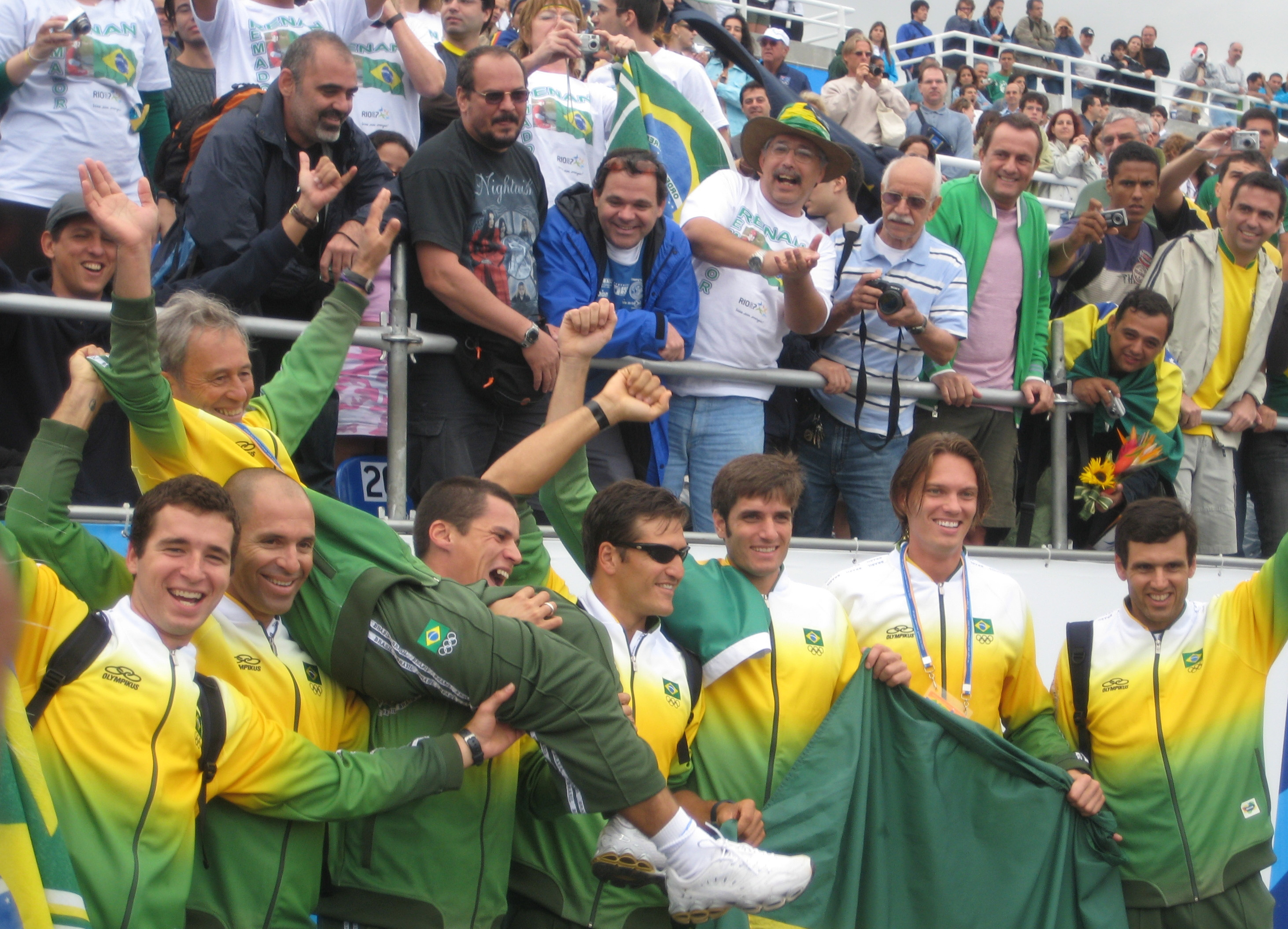
Brazilian men's eights team winning silver

Event	Gold	Silver	Bronze
Single sculls details	Argentina; Santiago Fernández	Cuba; Yoennis Hernández	Brazil; Marcelus dos Santos
Double sculls details	Cuba; Yoennis Hernández; Janier Concepción	Argentina; Rodrigo Murillo; Ariel Suárez	United States; Deaglan McEachern; Francis Cuddy
Coxless pairs details	Canada; Dan Casaca; Christopher Jarvis	United States; Dan Beery; Patrick O'Dunne	Brazil; Anderson Nocetti; Allan Bitencourt
Quadruple sculls details	Cuba; Yuleydis Cascaret; Janier Concepción; Ángel Fournier; Yoennis Hernández	Argentina; Víctor Claus; Ariel Suárez; Santiago Fernández; Cristian Rosso	United States; Warren Anderson; Jamie Schroeder; Deaglan McEachern; Francis Cuddy
Coxless fours details	Argentina; Horacio Sicilia; Maximiliano Martínez; Joaquín Iwan; Diego López	United States; Gabe Winkler; Sebastian Bea; Tyler Winklevoss; Cameron Winklevoss	Canada; Todd Keesey; Vincent Goodfellow; David Lamb; Brent Heron
Eights details	United States; Troy Kepper; Chris Callaghan; Gabe Winkler; Dan Beery; Cameron Winklevoss; Sebastian Bea; Patrick O'Dunne; Tyler Winklevoss; Ned Delguercio (C)	Brazil; Renan Castro; Alexandre Ribas; Leandro Tozzo; Gibran Cunha; José Roberto Nascimento; Marcelus dos Santos; Anderson Nocetti; Allan Bitencourt; Nilton Alonço (C)	Argentina; Alan San Martín; Marcelo Walter Bronca; Maximiliano Martínez; Joaquín Iwan; Horacio Sicilia; Diego Martín López; Damian Ordás; Mariano Palermo; Joel Infante (C)
Lightweight double sculls details	Cuba; Eyder Batista; Yunior Pérez	United States; Rich Montgomery; Andrew Liverman	Chile; Félipe Leal; Miguel Cerda
Lightweight coxless fours details	Canada; Adam Reynolds; Andrew Borden; John Haver; Paul Amesbury	United States; Andrew Bolton; Bjorn Larsen; Matthew Smith; Simon Carcagno	Cuba; Eyder Batista; Dixan Massip; Iran González; Yunior Pérez

=== Women's events ===
Event	Gold	Silver	Bronze
Single sculls details	Cuba; Mayra González	Argentina; María Gabriela Best	El Salvador; Camila Vargas
Double sculls details	United States; Sarah Trowbridge; Margaret Matia	Canada; Peggy Hyslop; Cristin McCarty	Cuba; Yursleydis Venet; Mayra González
Coxless pairs details	Chile; Soraya Jadue; María José Orellana	Canada; Zoe Hoskins; Nathalie Maurer	United States; Ruth Stiver; Jennifer Reck
Quadruple sculls details	Canada; Nathalie Maurer; Zoe Hoskins; Peggy Hyslop; Cristin McCarty	United States; Julie Nichols; Reilly Dampeer; Sarah Trowbridge; Margaret Matia	Argentina; Carolina Schiffmacher; María Laura Abalo; María Gabriela Best; Lucia Palermo
Lightweight double sculls details	Cuba; Yaima Velázquez; Ismaray Marerro	Mexico; Analicia Ramírez; Lila Pérez	Canada; Amber Cuthberton; Camille Brillon

== Medals table ==
Rank	Nation	Gold	Silver	Bronze	Total
1	Cuba	5	1	2	8
2	Canada	3	2	2	7
3	United States	2	5	3	10
4	Argentina	2	3	2	7
5	Chile	1	0	1	2
6	Brazil	0	1	2	3
7	Mexico	0	1	0	1
8	El Salvador	0	0	1	1
Totals (8 entries)		13	13	13	39
