= Santiago Fernández (rower) =

Argentine rower (born 1976)

Personal information
- Born: 23 September 1976 (age 49) San Fernando, Argentina
- Height: 1.91 m (6 ft 3 in)
- Weight: 93 kg (205 lb)
Medal record
Men's rowing
Representing Argentina
Pan American Games
Gold medal – first place	2007 Rio de Janeiro	Single sculls
Gold medal – first place	2011 Guadalajara	Quadruple sculls
Silver medal – second place	2007 Rio de Janeiro	Quadruple sculls

Santiago ("El Pollo") Fernández (born 23 September 1976) is a rower from Argentina. He competed in four Summer Olympics for Argentina: 1996, 2004, 2008, and 2012. Santiago won two gold medals at the Pan American Games. In 2010, he was granted the Konex Award Merit Diploma as one of the five best rowers of the last decade in Argentina.
