= César Amaris =

Venezuelan rower (born 1989)

Personal information
- Full name: César Amaris Fernández
- Nationality: Venezuela
- Born: 27 November 1989 (age 36) Caracas, Venezuela

Sport
- Sport: Rowing
Medal record
Representing Venezuela
Pan American Games
| Bronze medal – third place | 2011 Guadalajara | Double sculls |

César Amaris Fernández (Note: In this Spanish name, the first or paternal surname is Amaris and the second or maternal family name is Fernández.) (born 27 November 1989) is a Venezuelan rower. He competed in the 2020 Summer Olympics.
