= Stephen Kasprzyk =

American rower (born 1982)

Personal information
- Born: February 14, 1982 (age 44) Willingboro Township, New Jersey, United States
- Education: Holy Cross High School (2000); Drexel University (2005)

Sport
- Sport: Rowing
Medal record
Men's rowing
Representing the United States
World Championships
Bronze medal – third place	2013 Chungju	M8+
Pan American Games
Gold medal – first place	2011 Guadalajara	Eight

Stephen Kasprzyk (born February 14, 1982) is an American rower. He competed in the Men's eight event at the 2012 Summer Olympics and the 2016 Summer Olympics.

Born in Willingboro Township, New Jersey, Kasprzyk grew up in Cinnaminson Township, New Jersey. He graduated from Holy Cross High School as part of the class of 2000, and graduated in 2005 from Drexel University with a degree in chemical engineering.
