= Gabriela Best =

Argentine rower (born 1984)

Personal information
- Born: 1 December 1984 (age 41) Rosario, Santa Fe, Argentina

Sport
- Sport: Rowing
Medal record
Representing Argentina
Pan American Games
Gold medal – first place	2011 Guadalajara	Coxless pair
Gold medal – first place	2011 Guadalajara	Quadruple sculls
Silver medal – second place	2011 Guadalajara	Single sculls
Silver medal – second place	2007 Rio de Janeiro	Single sculls
Bronze medal – third place	2007 Rio de Janeiro	Quadruple sculls

Maria Gabriela Best (born 1 December 1984) is an Argentine rower. At the 2008 Summer Olympics, she competed in the women's single sculls. At the 2012 Summer Olympics, she competed in the Women's coxless pair with María Laura Abalo. Gabriela won two medals at the 2007 Pan American games and two gold medals (and a silver medal) at the 2011 Pan American Games.
