= Jhonatan Esquivel =

Uruguayan rower (born 1988)

Personal information
- Born: 13 October 1988 (age 38) Canelones, Uruguay
- Height: 1.82 m (6 ft 0 in)
- Weight: 84 kg (185 lb)

Jhonatan Esquivel (born 13 October 1988) is a Uruguayan rower.

== Olympic Games ==
Jhonatan attended the 2016 Olympic Games, representing Uruguay in the men's single sculls.
