= Janier Concepción =

Cuban rower (born 1985)

Personal information
- Born: Janier Concepción Hernández; 6 September 1985 (age 40) Sancti Spíritus, Cuba
- Height: 1.93 m (6 ft 4 in)
- Weight: 91 kg (201 lb)

Sport
- Country: Cuba
- Sport: Rowing
Medal record
Men's Rowing
Pan American Games
Gold medal – first place	2007 Rio de Janeiro	Double sculls
Gold medal – first place	2007 Rio de Janeiro	Quadruple sculls
Silver medal – second place	2011 Guadalajara	Double sculls
Silver medal – second place	2011 Guadalajara	Quadruple sculls
Silver medal – second place	2015 Toronto	Coxless four

Janier Concepción Hernández (born 6 September 1985) is a Cuban former rower who competed at the 2008 Summer Olympics.

== Biography ==
Concepción, who comes from Sancti Spíritus, earned two gold medals at the 2007 Pan American Games in Rio de Janeiro, winning the doubles sculls and quadruple sculls events. It was in quadruple sculls that he represented Cuba at the 2008 Beijing Olympics, teamed up with Yuleidys Cascaret, Ángel Fournier and Yoennis Hernández. They made it to the B final and finished in 12 position overall. He appeared at the World Rowing Championships four times during his career.
