= Yoennis Hernández =

Cuban rower (born 1978)

Personal information
- Nationality: Cuban
- Born: Yoennis Hernández Arruez; 1 February 1978 (age 48) Guantánamo
- Height: 1.90 m (6 ft 3 in)
- Weight: 93 kg (205 lb)

Sport
- Country: Cuba
- Sport: Rowing
- Club: Guantánamo CR
Medal record
Men's rowing
Pan American Games
Gold medal – first place	2003 Santo Domingo	Single sculls
Gold medal – first place	2003 Santo Domingo	Double sculls
Gold medal – first place	2003 Santo Domingo	Quadruple sculls
Gold medal – first place	2007 Rio de Janeiro	Double sculls
Gold medal – first place	2007 Rio de Janeiro	Quadruple sculls
Silver medal – second place	2011 Guadalajara	Double sculls
Silver medal – second place	2011 Guadalajara	Quadruple sculls
Silver medal – second place	2007 Rio de Janeiro	Single sculls
Bronze medal – third place	1999 Winnipeg	Single sculls
Bronze medal – third place	2003 Santo Domingo	Eights

Yoennis Hernández Arruez (born 1 February 1978) is a Cuban former rower who competed at three Summer Olympics.

== Biography ==
Born in Guantánamo, Hernández had a long career in rowing for Cuba. He represented Cuba at the 2000, 2004 and 2008 Olympics, as a double sculls and quadruple sculls rower. In all of his Olympic events he was able to make it to the B Final. He won a total of ten Pan American Games medals during his career. At every games from 1999 to 2011 he won at least one medal, five of them golds. He was also a regular competitor at the World Rowing Championships, with his best placing coming at Lucerne in 2001, when he and Yosbel Martínez were fourth in the doubles sculls
