= Rowing at the 1980 Summer Olympics =

Rowing at the Games of the XXII Olympiad
- Venue: Krylatskoye Rowing Canal
- Dates: 20–27 July 1980
- Competitors: 470 (313 men, 150 women) from 25 nations

Rowing at the 1980 Summer Olympics was represented by 14 events. It took place in the Man-made Basin, located at the Trade Unions Olympic Sports Centre (Krylatskoye district, Moscow). The rowing schedule began on 20 July and ended on 27 July.

Due to the Western boycott some strong rowing nations were not present. In that situation East Germany dominated the competition: they won 14 medals, including 11 golds, from 14 events.

The quadruple sculls events, introduced in 1976, were again held without coxswain for men and with coxswain for women.

== Participating nations ==
A total of 470 rowers from 25 nations competed at the Moscow Games:

- Australia (16)
- Austria (7)
- Brazil (10)
- Bulgaria (52)
- Cuba (17)
- Czechoslovakia (26)
- Denmark (7)
- East Germany (55)
- Spain (13)
- Finland (1)
- France (16)
- Great Britain (43)
- Greece (3)
- Guatemala (2)
- Hungary (20)
- Ireland (11)
- Italy (5)
- Mexico (1)
- Netherlands (10)
- Poland (37)
- Romania (33)
- Soviet Union (54)
- Sweden (7)
- Switzerland (10)
- Yugoslavia (14)

== Medal table ==
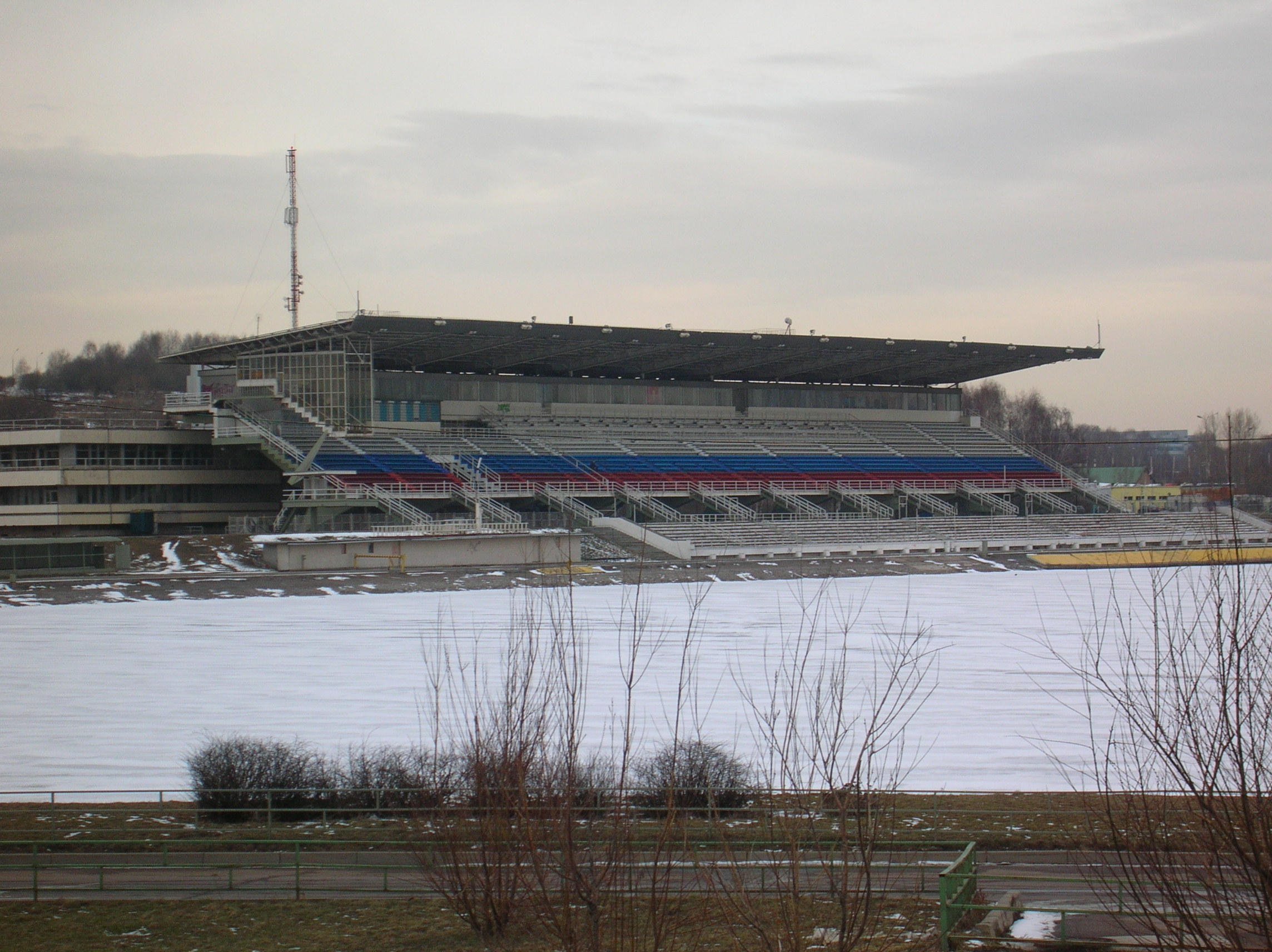
All events took place at the Moscow Canoeing and Rowing Basin in Krylatskoye

Rank	Nation	Gold	Silver	Bronze	Total
1	East Germany	11	1	2	14
2	Soviet Union	1	9	2	12
3	Romania	1	0	2	3
4	Finland	1	0	0	1
5	Bulgaria	0	1	3	4
6	Great Britain	0	1	2	3
7	Poland	0	1	1	2
7	Yugoslavia	0	1	1	2
9	Czechoslovakia	0	0	1	1
Totals (9 entries)		14	14	14	42

== Medal summary ==
=== Men's events ===
Games	Gold	Silver	Bronze
Single sculls	Pertti Karppinen; Finland	Vasil Yakusha; Soviet Union	Peter Kersten; East Germany
Double sculls	Joachim Dreifke and Klaus Kröppelien; East Germany	Zoran Pančić and Milorad Stanulov; Yugoslavia	Zdeněk Pecka and Václav Vochoska; Czechoslovakia
Quadruple sculls (coxless)	East Germany; Frank Dundr; Carsten Bunk; Uwe Heppner; Martin Winter	Soviet Union; Yuriy Shapochka; Evgeniy Barbakov; Valeriy Kleshnyov; Mykola Dovhan	Bulgaria; Mincho Nikolov; Lyubomir Petrov; Ivo Rusev; Bogdan Dobrev
Coxless pairs	Bernd Landvoigt and Jörg Landvoigt; East Germany	Yuriy Pimenov and Nikolay Pimenov; Soviet Union	Charles Wiggin and Malcolm Carmichael; Great Britain
Coxed pairs	East Germany; Harald Jährling; Friedrich-Wilhelm Ulrich; Georg Spohr (cox)	Soviet Union; Viktor Pereverzev; Gennadi Kryuçkin; Aleksandr Lukyanov (cox)	Yugoslavia; Duško Mrduljaš; Zlatko Celent; Josip Reić (cox)
Coxless fours	East Germany; Siegfried Brietzke; Andreas Decker; Stefan Semmler; Jürgen Thiele	Soviet Union; Aleksey Kamkin; Valeriy Dolinin; Aleksandr Kulagin; Vitali Eliseev	Great Britain; John Beattie; Ian McNuff; David Townsend; Martin Cross
Coxed four	East Germany; Dieter Wendisch; Walter Dießner; Ullrich Dießner; Gottfried Döhn; Andreas Gregor (cox)	Soviet Union; Artūrs Garonskis; Dimants Krišjānis; Dzintars Krišjānis; Žoržs Tikmers; Juris Bērziņš (cox)	Poland; Grzegorz Stellak; Adam Tomasiak; Grzegorz Nowak; Ryszard Stadniuk; Ryszard Kubiak (cox)
Eights	East Germany; Bernd Krauß; Hans-Peter Koppe; Ulrich Kons; Jörg Friedrich; Jens Doberschütz; Ulrich Karnatz; Uwe Dühring; Bernd Höing; Klaus-Dieter Ludwig (cox)	Great Britain; Duncan McDougall; Allan Whitwell; Henry Clay; Chris Mahoney; Andrew Justice; John Pritchard; Malcolm McGowan; Richard Stanhope; Colin Moynihan (cox)	Soviet Union; Viktor Kokoshyn; Andriy Tishchenko; Oleksandr Tkachenko; Jonas Pinskus; Jonas Narmontas; Andrey Luhin; Oleksandr Mantsevych; Ihar Maystrenka; Hryhoriy Dmytrenko (cox)

=== Women's events ===
Games	Gold	Silver	Bronze
Single sculls	Sanda Toma; Romania	Antonina Zelikovich; Soviet Union	Martina Schröter; East Germany
Double sculls	Yelena Khloptseva and Larisa Popova; Soviet Union	Cornelia Linse and Heidi Westphal; East Germany	Olga Homeghi and Valeria Răcilă; Romania
Quadruple sculls (coxed)	East Germany; Sybille Reinhardt; Jutta Ploch; Jutta Lau; Roswietha Zobelt; Liane Buhr	Soviet Union; Antonina Pustovit; Yelena Matiyevskaya; Olga Vasilchenko; Nadezhda Lyubimova; Nina Cheremisina	Bulgaria; Mariana Serbezova; Rumelyana Boncheva; Dolores Nakova; Anka Bakova; Anka Georgieva
Coxless pairs	Ute Steindorf and Cornelia Klier; East Germany	Małgorzata Dłużewska and Czesława Kościańska; Poland	Siika Barboulova and Stoyanka Kurbatova; Bulgaria
Coxed four	East Germany; Ramona Kapheim; Silvia Fröhlich; Angelika Noack; Romy Saalfeld; Kirsten Wenzel	Bulgaria; Ginka Gyurova; Mariyka Modeva; Rita Todorova; Iskra Velinova; Nadiya Filipova	Soviet Union; Mariya Fadeyeva; Galina Sovetnikova; Marina Studneva; Svetlana Semyonova; Nina Cheremisina
Eights	East Germany; Martina Boesler; Christiane Knetsch; Gabriele Kühn; Karin Metze; Kersten Neisser; Ilona Richter; Marita Sandig; Birgit Schütz; Marina Wilke	Soviet Union; Nina Frolova; Mariya Payun; Olga Pivovarova; Nina Preobrazhenskaya; Nadezhda Prishchepa; Tatyana Stetsenko; Elena Tereshina; Nina Umanets; Valentina Zhulina	Romania; Angelica Aposteanu; Elena Bondar; Florica Bucur; Maria Constantinescu; Elena Dobrițoiu; Rodica Frîntu; Ana Iliuță; Rodica Pușcatu; Marlena Zagoni
