= Great Britain at the 1980 Summer Olympics =

- Flag of the Olympic Movement
- IOC code: GBR
- NOC: British Olympic Association

in Moscow
- Competitors: 219 (149 men and 70 women) in 14 sports
- Flag bearer: Richard Palmer (official)
- Medals Ranked 9th: Gold 5 Silver 7 Bronze 9 Total 21

Summer Olympics appearances (overview)
- 1896; 1900; 1904; 1908; 1912; 1920; 1924; 1928; 1932; 1936; 1948; 1952; 1956; 1960; 1964; 1968; 1972; 1976; 1980; 1984; 1988; 1992; 1996; 2000; 2004; 2008; 2012; 2016; 2020; 2024

Other related appearances
- 1906 Intercalated Games

Great Britain, represented by the British Olympic Association (BOA), competed at the 1980 Summer Olympics in Moscow, Russian SFSR, Soviet Union. British athletes have competed in every Summer Olympic Games. 219 competitors, 149 men and 70 women, took part in 145 events in 14 sports.

In partial support of the American-led boycott, the UK government allowed its athletes to choose whether to compete. There was a boycott of the opening ceremony with Britain being represented solely by the General Secretary of the British Olympic Association, Dick Palmer, carrying the Olympic flag, and no athletes being present. Furthermore, the Olympic flag was raised for the British medal winners in place of the Union Flag, and the Olympic anthem was played instead of God Save the Queen for the five gold medalists.

== Medalists ==
Medals by discipline
Discipline	Gold medal	Silver medal	Bronze medal	Total
Athletics	4	2	4	10
Swimming	1	3	1	5
Rowing	0	1	2	3
Judo	0	1	1	2
Boxing	0	0	1	1
Total	5	7	9	21

=== Gold ===
- Allan Wells — Athletics, Men's 100 metres
- Steve Ovett — Athletics, Men's 800 metres
- Sebastian Coe — Athletics, Men's 1500 metres
- Daley Thompson — Athletics, Men's Decathlon
- Duncan Goodhew — Swimming, Men's 100 m Breaststroke

=== Silver ===
- Allan Wells — Athletics, Men's 200 metres
- Sebastian Coe — Athletics, Men's 800 metres
- Neil Adams — Judo, Men's Lightweight (71 kg)
- Henry Clay, Andrew Justice, Chris Mahoney, Duncan McDougall, Malcolm McGowan, Colin Moynihan, John Pritchard, Richard Stanhope, and Allan Whitwell — Rowing, Men's Eights
- Philip Hubble — Swimming, Men's 200 m Butterfly
- Sharron Davies — Swimming, Women's 400 m Individual Medley
- June Croft, Helen Jameson, Margaret Kelly, and Ann Osgerby — Swimming, Women's 4 × 100 m Medley Relay

=== Bronze ===
- Steve Ovett — Athletics, Men's 1500 metres
- Gary Oakes — Athletics, Men's 400 m Hurdles
- Beverley Goddard-Callender, Heather Hunte, Sonia Lannaman, and Kathy Smallwood-Cook — Athletics, Women's 4 × 100 m Relay
- Donna Hartley, Joslyn Hoyte-Smith, Linsey MacDonald, and Michelle Probert — Athletics, Women's 4 × 400 m Relay
- Anthony Willis — Boxing, Men's Light Welterweight
- Arthur Mapp — Judo, Men's Open Class
- Malcolm Carmichael and Charles Wiggin — Rowing, Men's Coxless Pairs
- John Beattie, David Townsend, Ian McNuff, and Martin Cross — Rowing, Men's Coxless Fours
- Gary Abraham, Duncan Goodhew, David Lowe, and Trevor Smith — Swimming, Men's 4 × 100 m Medley Relay

== Archery ==
In the third appearance by Great Britain in modern Olympic archery, two men and two women represented the country. Mark Blenkarne missed winning a medal in the men's competition by only three points, by far the most successful result for Great Britain since archery was returned to the Olympic schedule.

Women's Individual Competition:

- Gillian Patterson — 2216 points (→ 22nd place)
- Christine Harris — 2187 points (→ 25th place)

Men's Individual Competition:

- Mark Blenkarne — 2446 points (→ 4th place)
- Dennis Savory — 2407 points (→ 13th place)

== Athletics ==
Key

- Note–Ranks given for track events are within the athlete's heat only
- Q = Qualified for the next round
- q = Qualified for the next round as a fastest loser or, in field events, by position without achieving the qualifying target
- NR = National record
- N/A = Round not applicable for the event
- Bye = Athlete not required to compete in round

Men
Track & road events

Athlete	Event	Heat		Quarterfinal		Semifinal		Final	
Athlete	Event	Result	Rank	Result	Rank	Result	Rank	Result	Rank
Drew McMaster	100 m	10.43	3 Q	10.42	6	Did not advance			
Cameron Sharp	100 m	10.38	2 Q	10.38	4 Q	10.60	7	Did not advance	
Allan Wells	100 m	10.35	1 Q	10.11	1 Q	10.27	1 Q	10.25	1st place, gold medalist(s)
Mike McFarlane	200 m	21.43	4 q	20.33	6	Did not advance			
Cameron Sharp	200 m	20.51	1 Q	21.16	4 Q	21.24	8	Did not advance	
Allan Wells	200 m	21.57	2 Q	20.59	1 Q	20.75	4 Q	20.21	2nd place, silver medalist(s)
Alan Bell	400 m	47.48	4 Q	46.17	4 Q	48.50	8	Did not advance	
Glen Cohen	400 m	48.35	4 Q	47.35	7	Did not advance			
David Jenkins	400 m	46.67	1 Q	45.99	1 Q	45.59	3 Q	45.56	7
Sebastian Coe	800 m	1:48.5	1 Q	—N/a		1:46.7	1 Q	1:45.9	2nd place, silver medalist(s)
Steve Ovett	800 m	1:49.4	1 Q	—N/a		1:46.6	1 Q	1:45.4	1st place, gold medalist(s)
David Warren	800 m	1:49.9	2 Q	—N/a		1:47.2	2 Q	1:49.3	8
Sebastian Coe	1500 m	3:40.1	2 Q	—N/a		3:39.4	1 Q	3:38.4	1st place, gold medalist(s)
Steve Cram	1500 m	3:44.1	4 Q	—N/a		3:43.6	4 Q	3:42.0	8
Steve Ovett	1500 m	3:36.8	1 Q	—N/a		3:43.1	1 Q	3:39.0	3rd place, bronze medalist(s)
David Moorcroft	5000 m	13:43.0	5 Q	—N/a		13:52.8	9	Did not advance	
Nick Rose	5000 m	13:44.7	3 Q	—N/a		13:40.6	5	Did not advance	
Barry Smith	5000 m	13:46.3	7 q	—N/a		13:36.7	9	Did not advance	
Brendan Foster	10000 m	26:55.15	5 Q	—N/a				28:22.54	11
Mike McLeod	10000 m	28:57.27	2 Q	—N/a				28:40.78	12
Geoff Smith	10000 m	30:00.1	7	—N/a				Did not advance	
Wilbert Greaves	110 m hurdles	13.85	4 Q	—N/a		13.98	6	Did not advance	
Mark Holtom	110 m hurdles	13.83	3 Q	—N/a		13.94	5	Did not advance	
Gary Oakes	400 m hurdles	50.39	3 Q	—N/a		50.07	3 Q	49.11	3rd place, bronze medalist(s)
Roger Hackney	3000 m steeplechase	8:36.34	5 Q	—N/a		8:29.18	7	Did not advance	
Colin Reitz	3000 m steeplechase	8:35.21	4 Q	—N/a		8:29.75	8	Did not advance	
Tony Staynings	3000 m steeplechase	8:47.42	8 q	—N/a		8:52.30	11	Did not advance	
Mike McFarlane; Allan Wells; Cameron Sharp; Drew McMaster	4 × 100 m relay	39.20	3 Q	—N/a				38.62	4
Alan Bell; Terry Whitehead; Rod Milne; Glen Cohen	4 × 400 m relay	3:05.9	2 Q	—N/a				DNF	
Dave Black	Marathon	—N/a						DNF	
Bernie Ford	Marathon	—N/a						DNF	
Ian Thompson	Marathon	—N/a						DNF	
Roger Mills	20 km walk	—N/a						1:32:37.8	10
Ian Richards	50 km walk	—N/a						4:22:57	11

Field events

Athlete	Event	Qualification		Final	
Athlete	Event	Distance	Position	Distance	Position
Mark Naylor	High jump	2.21	1 Q	2.21	9
Brian Hooper	Pole vault	5.35	10 q	5.35	11
Keith Connor	Triple jump	16.57	6 Q	16.87	4
Geoff Capes	Shot put	19.75	8 Q	20.50	5
Chris Black	Hammer throw	66.74	14	Did not advance	
Paul Dickenson	Hammer throw	64.22	15	Did not advance	
David Ottley	Javelin throw	77.20	14	Did not advance	

Combined events – Decathlon

Athlete	Event	100 m	LJ	SP	HJ	400 m	110H	DT	PV	JT	1500 m	Final	Rank
Bradley McStravick	Result	10.97	6.74	13.53	1.91	48.80	15.23	39.46	4.30	57.98	4:31.0	7616	15
Daley Thompson	Result	10.62	8.00	15.18	2.08	48.01	14.47	42.24	4.70	64.16	4:39.9	8495	1st place, gold medalist(s)

Women
Track & road events

Athlete	Event	Heat		Quarterfinal		Semifinal		Final	
Athlete	Event	Result	Rank	Result	Rank	Result	Rank	Result	Rank
Heather Hunte	100 m	11.40	3 Q	11.25	3 Q	11.36	4 Q	11.34	8
Sonia Lannaman	100 m	11.58	3 Q	11.20	2 Q	11.38	5	Did not advance	
Kathy Smallwood	100 m	11.37	2 Q	11.24	2 Q	11.30	3 Q	11.28	6
Beverley Goddard	200 m	22.97	3 Q	—N/a		22.73	4 Q	22.72	6
Sonia Lannaman	200 m	22.84	3 Q	—N/a		22.82	4 Q	22.80	8
Kathy Smallwood	200 m	22.95	1 Q	—N/a		22.65	3 Q	22.61	5
Joslyn Hoyte-Smith	400 m	52.24	1 Q	—N/a		51.47	6	Did not advance	
Linsey MacDonald	400 m	52.57	2 Q	—N/a		51.60	4 Q	52.40	8
Michelle Probert	400 m	52.16	3 Q	—N/a		51.89	5	Did not advance	
Christina Boxer	800 m	2:02.1	4 Q	—N/a		2:00.9	8	Did not advance	
Janet Marlow	1500 m	4:15.9	9	—N/a		Did not advance			
Lorna Boothe	100 m hurdles	13.86	6	—N/a		Did not advance			
Shirley Strong	100 m hurdles	13.39	4 Q	—N/a		13.12	5	Did not advance	
Heather Hunte; Kathy Smallwood; Beverley Goddard; Sonia Lannaman	4 × 100 m relay	—N/a						42.43	3rd place, bronze medalist(s)
Donna Hartley; Joslyn Hoyte-Smith; Linsey MacDonald; Michelle Probert	4 × 400 m relay	—N/a				3:29.0	3	3:27.5	3rd place, bronze medalist(s)

Field events

Athlete	Event	Qualification		Final	
Athlete	Event	Distance	Position	Distance	Position
Louise Miller	High jump	1.88	5 Q	1.85	11
Susan Hearnshaw	Long jump	6.66	2 Q	6.50	9
Sue Reeve	Long jump	6.48	6 Q	6.46	10
Angela Littlewood	Shot put	17.53	13	Did not advance	
Meg Ritchie	Discus throw	58.66	10 Q	61.16	9
Tessa Sanderson	Javelin throw	48.76	9	Did not advance	
Fatima Whitbread	Javelin throw	49.74	10	Did not advance	

Combined events – Pentathlon

Athlete	Event	100H	SP	HJ	LJ	800 m	Final	Rank
Judy Livermore	Result	13.57	13.56	1.77	5.71	2:25.3	4304	13
Sue Longden	Result	14.10	11.47	1.74	6.09	2:19.6	4234	15
Yvette Wray	Result	13.78	12.01	1.65	5.60	2:39.7	4159	16

== Boxing ==
Athlete	Event	Round of 32	Round of 16	Quarterfinals	Semifinals	Final	
Athlete	Event	Opposition Result	Opposition Result	Opposition Result	Opposition Result	Opposition Result	Rank
Keith Wallace	Flyweight	Bye	Radu (ROU); L 1-4	Did not advance			
Ray Gilbody	Bantamweight	Almeida (ANG); W 5-0	Zaragoza (MEX); L 1-4	Did not advance			
Peter Hanlon	Featherweight	Esparragoza (VEN); W 4-1	Rybakov (URS); L 0-5	Did not advance			
George Gilbody	Lightweight	Bye	Siukoko (ZAM); L 1-4	Did not advance			
Tony Willis	Light welterweight	Sodré (BRA); W 5-0	Odhiambo (SWE); W 5-0	Lyimo (TAN); W KO	Oliva (ITA); L 0-5	Did not advance	3rd place, bronze medalist(s)
Joseph Frost	Welterweight	Dao (LAO); L KO	Did not advance				
Nick Wilshire	Light middleweight	Bye	Perunović (YUG); W 3-2	Koshkin (URS); L KO	Did not advance		
Mark Kaylor	Middleweight	Bye	Fonseca (BRA); W 4-1	Silaghi (ROU); L 2-3	Did not advance		
Andy Straughn	Light heavyweight	—N/a	Kvachadze (URS); L RSC	Did not advance			

== Canoeing ==
Men

Athlete	Event	Heat		Repechage		Semifinals		Final	
Athlete	Event	Time	Rank	Time	Rank	Time	Rank	Time	Rank
William Reichenstein	C-1 500 metres	2:09.37	5 QS	—N/a		2:09.86	5	Did not advance	
William Reichenstein	C-1 1000 metres	4:28.18	6 QS	—N/a		4:29.72	5	Did not advance	
Grayson Bourne	K-1 500 metres	1:51.80	5 R	1:47.39	1 Q	1:48.34	4	Did not advance	
Douglas Parnham	K-1 1000 metres	3:54.58	6 R	4:06.96	6	Did not advance			
Christopher Ballard; Neil Robson	K-2 500 metres	1:40.33	7 R	1:39.95	3 Q	1:41.37	5	Did not advance	
Christopher Ballard; Neil Robson	K-2 1000 metres	3:28.95	3 QS	—N/a		3:40.31	4	Did not advance	
Stephen Brown; Douglas Parnham; Alan Williams; Steven Hancock	K-4 1000 metres	3:10.18	7 QS	—N/a		3:13.41	4	Did not advance	

Women

Athlete	Event	Heat		Repechage		Semifinals		Final	
Athlete	Event	Time	Rank	Time	Rank	Time	Rank	Time	Rank
Lucy Perrett	K-1 500 metres	2:03.09	5 QS	—N/a		2:03.73	2 Q	2:04.89	8
Frances Wetherall; Lesley Smither	K-2 500 metres	1:53.25	5 QS	—N/a		1:53.12	3 Q	1:52.76	8

== Cycling ==
Road

Athlete	Event	Time	Rank
John Herety	Individual road race	4:57.38	21
Neil Martin	Individual road race	5:09:05	49
Joseph Waugh	Individual road race	DNF	
Jeff Williams	Individual road race	5:09:05	47
Robert Downs; Des Fretwell; Steve Jones; Joseph Waugh	Team time trial	2:07:30.6	9

Track

Athlete	Event	Time	Rank
Terrence Tinsley	Track time trial	1:07.542	9

Athlete	Event	Round 1	Repechage	Round 2	Repechage	1/8 Final	Repechage	Quarter Final	Semifinal	Final	
Athlete	Event	Opposition Result	Opposition Result	Opposition Result	Opposition Result	Opposition Result	Opposition Result	Opposition Result	Opposition Result	Opposition Result	Rank
Terrence Tinsley	Sprint	Cahard (FRA); R	Musa (ZIM); 11.62 Q	Dazzan (ITA); R	Joseph (GUY); DNF	Did not advance					N/A

Athlete	Event	Qualifying		Quarter Final	Semifinal	Final	
Athlete	Event	Time	Rank	Opposition Result	Opposition Result	Opposition Result	Rank
Sean Yates	Individual pursuit	4:44.69	7	Ørsted (DEN); 4:41.39 R	Did not advance		N/A
Tony Doyle; Malcolm Elliott; Glen Mitchell; Sean Yates	Team pursuit	4:19.73	5 Q	Czechoslovakia; 4:23.45 R	Did not advance		N/A

== Diving ==
Athlete	Event	Qualifying		Final	
Athlete	Event	Points	Rank	Points	Rank
Christopher Snode	Men's 3 metre springboard	557.10	5 Q	844.470	6
Martyn Brown	Men's 10 metre platform	380.91	19	Did not advance	
Christopher Snode	Men's 10 metre platform	468.21	9	Did not advance	
Alison Drake	Women's 3 metre springboard	368.01	20	Did not advance	
Deborah Jay	Women's 3 metre springboard	362.73	22	Did not advance	
Lindsey Fraser	Women's 10 metre platform	277.08	15	Did not advance	
Marion Saunders	Women's 10 metre platform	290.82	14	Did not advance	

== Fencing ==
Eleven fencers, six men and five women, represented Great Britain in 1980.

Athlete	Event	Round 1			Round 2			Elimination			Final		
Athlete	Event	Won	Lost	Rank	Won	Lost	Rank	Won	Lost	Rank	Won	Lost	Rank
John Llewellyn	Men's épée	3	2	3 Q	0	5	6	Did not advance					
Neal Mallett	Men's épée	1	3	5	Did not advance								
Steven Paul	Men's épée	2	2	3 Q	3	2	4 Q	0	2	—N/a	Did not advance		
Rob Bruniges; John Llewellyn; Neal Mallett; Steven Paul	Men's team épée	0	1	2 Q	—N/a						1	2	5
Rob Bruniges	Men's foil	3	1	1 Q	2	3	5	Did not advance					
Pierre Harper	Men's foil	1	2	3 Q	2	3	4 Q	0	2	—N/a	Did not advance		
Rob Bruniges; Pierre Harper; John Llewellyn; Steven Paul	Men's team foil	0	2	3	—N/a						Did not advance		
Mark Slade	Men's sabre	2	2	4 Q	0	5	6	Did not advance					
Ann Brannon	Women's foil	1	3	4 Q	2	3	5	Did not advance					
Linda Ann Martin	Women's foil	1	4	6	Did not advance								
Susan Wrigglesworth	Women's foil	1	4	6	Did not advance								
Wendy Ager; Ann Brannon; Hilary Cawthorne; Linda Ann Martin; Susan Wrigglesworth	Women's team foil	1	1	3	—N/a						Did not advance		

== Judo ==
Athlete	Event	Round of 32	Round of 16	Quarterfinals	Semifinals	Final	
Athlete	Event	Opposition Result	Opposition Result	Opposition Result	Opposition Result	Opposition Result	Rank
John Holliday	Extra Lightweight	Francini (SMR); W	Spyrou (CYP); W	Rodríguez (CUB); L	Repechage; El-Najjar (SYR); W	Bronze Medal; Kincses (HUN); L	—N/a
Raymond Neenan	Half Lightweight	Očko (YUG); W	Rabary (MAD); W	Reissmann (GDR); L	Did not advance		
Neil Adams	Lightweight	Picken (AUS); W	Nkandem (CMR); W	Alkśnin (POL); W	Lehmann (GDR); W	Gamba (ITA); L	2nd place, silver medalist(s)
Christopher Bowles	Half Middleweight	Simo (CMR); W	Tchoullouyan (FRA); L	Did not advance			
Peter Donnelly	Middleweight	Azcuy (CUB); L	—N/a	Repechage Q/F; Muhakatesho (ZAM); W	Repechage S/F; Ultsch (GDR); L	Did not advance	
Mark Chittenden	Half-Heavyweight	Nikodým (TCH); W	de Wet (ZIM); W	Numan (NED); L	Did not advance		
Paul Radburn	Heavyweight	Bye	Cioc (ROM); W	Zinneker (SUI); W	Parisi (FRA); L	Bronze Medal; Kocman (TCH); L	—N/a
Arthur Mapp	Open category	Adelaar (NED); W	de Wet (ZIM); W	Zapryanov (BUL); W	Lorenz (GDR); L	Tsend–Ayuush (MGL); W	3rd place, bronze medalist(s)

== Modern pentathlon ==
Athlete	Event	Rid	Fen	Sho	Swi	Run	Total	Rank
Nigel Clark	Individual	986	714	824	1141	1141	4809	33
Danny Nightingale	Individual	950	766	1000	1212	1240	5168	15
Peter Whiteside	Individual	1010	766	1000	1228	1081	5085	21
Nigel Clark; Danny Nightingale; Peter Whiteside	Team	See above					15062	8

== Rowing ==
Men

Athlete	Event	Round 1		Repechage		Semifinal		Final	
Athlete	Event	Time	Rank	Time	Rank	Time	Rank	Time	Rank
Hugh Matheson	Men's single sculls	7:53.22	1 Q	—N/a		7:21.05	3 QA	7:20.28	6
Chris Baillieu; Jim Clark	Men's double sculls	6:59.67	1 Q	—N/a				6:31.13	4
Malcolm Carmichael; Charles Wiggin	Men's coxless pair	7:30.57	2 Q	—N/a		6:51.47	2 QA	6:51.47	3rd place, bronze medalist(s)
Neil Christie; James MacLeod; David Webb (cox)	Men's coxed pair	7:42.39	4 R	7:29.97	3 QB	—N/a		7:23.18	9
John Beattie; Martin Cross; Ian McNuff; David Townsend	Men's coxless four	6:42.73	4 R	6:12.71	1 QA	—N/a		6:16.58	3rd place, bronze medalist(s)
Gordon Rankine; John Roberts; Lenny Robertson; Colin Seymour; Alan Inns (cox)	Men's coxed four	6:52.57	2 R	6:33.25	3 QB	—N/a		6:27.11	7
Henry Clay; Andrew Justice; Chris Mahoney; Duncan McDougall; Malcolm McGowan; John Pritchard; Richard Stanhope; Allan Whitwell; Colin Moynihan (cox)	Men's eight	5:53.38	2 R	5:49.35	2 QA	—N/a		5:51.92	2nd place, silver medalist(s)

Women

Athlete	Event	Round 1		Repechage		Semifinal		Final	
Athlete	Event	Time	Rank	Time	Rank	Time	Rank	Time	Rank
Beryl Mitchell	Women's single sculls	4:05.72	1 Q	—N/a		3:45.88	2 QA	3:49.71	5
Astrid Ayling; Sue Handscomb	Women's double sculls	3:39.27	2 R	3:33.32	5	Did not advance			
Bridget Buckley; Jane Cross; Pauline Hart; Pauline Janson; Sue Brown (cox)	Women's coxed four	3:48.13	3 R	3:35.85	4	Did not advance			
Nicola Boyes; Lin Clark; Rosie Clugston; Gillian Hodges; Beverly Jones; Elizabeth Paton; Penny Sweet; Joanna Toch; Pauline Wright (cox)	Women's eight	3:18.18	2 R	3:15.77	3 Q	—N/a		3:13.85	5

== Swimming ==
Men's Competition

Athlete	Event	Heat		Semifinal		Final	
Athlete	Event	Time	Rank	Time	Rank	Time	Rank
Martin Smith	100 metre freestyle	51.88	2 Q	52.41	7	Did not advance	
Mark Taylor	100 metre freestyle	52.65	3	Did not advance			
Martin Smith	200 metre freestyle	1:54.17	4	Did not advance			
Kevin Lee	200 metre freestyle	1:55.63	5	Did not advance			
Andrew Astbury	400 metre freestyle	4:00.30	4	—N/a		Did not advance	
Simon Gray	400 metre freestyle	3:57.60	4	—N/a		Did not advance	
Simon Gray	1500 metre freestyle	15:43.17	3	—N/a		Did not advance	
Gary Abraham	100 metre backstroke	58.79	2 Q	57.90	3 Q	58.38	8
Douglas Campbell	100 metre backstroke	58.75	4 Q	58.61	6	Did not advance	
Paul Marshall	100 metre backstroke	58.35	2 Q	58.82	8	Did not advance	
Douglas Campbell	200 metre backstroke	2:04.78	2 Q	—N/a		2:04.23	7
Jim Carter	200 metre backstroke	2:09.94	5	—N/a		Did not advance	
Leigh Atkinson	100 metre breaststroke	1:06.43	4	—N/a		Did not advance	
Duncan Goodhew	100 metre breaststroke	1:03.48	1 Q	—N/a		1:03.34	1st place, gold medalist(s)
Duncan Goodhew	200 metre breaststroke	2:21.25	2 Q	—N/a		2:20.92	6
Gary Abraham	100 metre butterfly	56.10	2 Q	55.53	3 Q	55.42	6
Phil Hubble	100 metre butterfly	56.30	3 Q	56.51	6	Did not advance	
David Lowe	100 metre butterfly	56.22	3 Q	55.81	5	Did not advance	
Phil Hubble	200 metre butterfly	2:00.75	2 Q	—N/a		2:01.20	2nd place, silver medalist(s)
Peter Morris	200 metre butterfly	2:02.72	1 Q	—N/a		2:02.27	4
Steve Poulter	200 metre butterfly	2:02.18	3 Q	—N/a		2:02.93	8
Simon Gray	400 metre individual medley	4:29.43	3	—N/a		Did not advance	
Steve Poulter	400 metre individual medley	4:35.21	4	—N/a		Did not advance	
Andrew Astbury; Douglas Campbell; Phil Hubble; Martin Smith; Mark Taylor; Kevin Lee	4 × 200 metre freestyle relay	7:37.36	4 Q	—N/a		7:30.81	6
Gary Abraham; Duncan Goodhew; David Lowe; Martin Smith; Mark Taylor; Paul Marshall	4 × 100 metre medley relay	3:51.66	1 Q	—N/a		3:47.71	3rd place, bronze medalist(s)

Women's Competition

Athlete	Event	Heat		Final	
Athlete	Event	Time	Rank	Time	Rank
June Croft	100 metre freestyle	57.88	2	Did not advance	
Jackie Willmott	100 metre freestyle	58.78	3	Did not advance	
June Croft	200 metre freestyle	2:03.95	2 Q	2:03.15	6
Jackie Willmott	200 metre freestyle	2:08.04	5	Did not advance	
Sharron Davies	400 metre freestyle	4:19.99	4	Did not advance	
Jackie Willmott	400 metre freestyle	4:22.32	5	Did not advance	
Jackie Willmott	800 metre freestyle	8:50.51	5	Did not advance	
Joy Beasley	100 metre backstroke	1:06.84	5	Did not advance	
Helen Jameson	100 metre backstroke	1:05.56	6	Did not advance	
Jane Admans	200 metre backstroke	2:19.20	5	Did not advance	
Helen Jameson	200 metre backstroke	2:17.84	4	Did not advance	
Suki Brownsdon	100 metre breaststroke	1:12.83	3 Q	1:12.11	6
Margaret Kelly	100 metre breaststroke	1:12.38	3 Q	1:11.48	4
Margaret Kelly	200 metre breaststroke	2:37.67	3	Did not advance	
Debbie Rudd	200 metre breaststroke	2:36.32	3	Did not advance	
Susan Cooper	100 metre butterfly	1:02.95	2	Did not advance	
Ann Osgerby	100 metre butterfly	1:01.93	2 Q	1:02.21	4
Janet Osgerby	100 metre butterfly	1:02.84	3 Q	1:02.90	8
Ann Osgerby	200 metre butterfly	2:15.17	3 Q	2:14.83	6
Janet Osgerby	200 metre butterfly	2:18.01	5	Did not advance	
Sharron Davies	400 metre individual medley	4:52.38	1 Q	4:46.83	2nd place, silver medalist(s)
Sarah Kerswell	400 metre individual medley	5:03.75	3	Did not advance	
June Croft; Sharron Davies; Kaye Lovatt; Jackie Willmott	4 × 100 metre freestyle relay	3:53.08	3 Q	3:51.71	4
June Croft; Helen Jameson; Margaret Kelly; Ann Osgerby	4 × 100 metre medley relay	4:16.29	1 Q	4:12.24	2nd place, silver medalist(s)

== Weightlifting ==
Athlete	Event	Snatch	Clean & Jerk	Total	Rank
Jeffrey Bryce	Men's 60 kg	NM	—N/a	—N/a	—N/a
Geoff Laws	Men's 60 kg	110	135	245	12
Leo Isaac	Men's 67.5 kg	117.5	157.5	275	14
Alan Winterbourne	Men's 67.5 kg	117.5	150	267.5	18
Newton Burrowes	Men's 75 kg	130	172.5	302.5	8
Kevin Kennedy	Men's 75 kg	130	160	290	11
Stephen Pinsent	Men's 82.5 kg	135	170	305	13
Gary Langford	Men's 90 kg	150	180	330	9
John Burns	Men's 100 kg	157.5	180	337.5	11
Andy Drzewiecki	Men's 110 kg	140	180	320	10

== Wrestling ==
Athlete	Event	Round 1	Round 2	Round 3	Round 4	Round 5	Final	
Athlete	Event	Opposition Result	Opposition Result	Opposition Result	Opposition Result	Opposition Result	Opposition Result	Rank
Mark Dunbar	Men's freestyle 52 kg	Selimov (BUL); L	Jang D-R (PRK); L	Did not advance				
Amrik Singh Gill	Men's freestyle 57 kg	Kończak (POL); L	Li H-P (PRK); L	Did not advance				
Brian Aspen	Men's freestyle 62 kg	Hatziioannidis (GRE); L	Bye	Şuteu (ROU); L	Did not advance			
Fitzloyd Walker	Men's freestyle 74 kg	Fehér (HUN); L	Pinigin (URS); L	Did not advance				
Keith Peache	Men's freestyle 90 kg	Gómez (CUB); L	Ivanov (ROU); L	Did not advance				
Matthew Clempner	Men's freestyle +100 kg	Zambrano (PER); L	Sandurski (POL); L	Did not advance				
