= 1978 British Rowing Championships =

- Venue: National Water Sports Centre
- Location: Holme Pierrepont (Nottingham)
- Dates: 14–16 July 1978

The 1978 National Rowing Championships was the seventh edition of the National Championships, held from 14–16 July 1978 at the National Water Sports Centre in Holme Pierrepont, Nottingham. There was a record entry of 428 crews.

== Senior ==
=== Medal summary ===
Event	Gold	Silver	Bronze
Men Victor Ludorum	Leander		
Men 1x	Thames Tradesmen's; Hugh Matheson		
Men 2+	Kingston		
Men 2x	Leander		
Men 2-	Leander; Charles Wiggin & Malcolm Carmichael	Abingdon; Mike Diserens & Ali Jelfs	
Men 4-	London		
Men 4+	London University		
Men 4x	Leander; Charles Wiggin, Malcolm Carmichael, Eric Sims, Allan Whitwell		
Men 8+	Leander		
Women Victor Ludorum	Thames		
Women 1x	Kingston; Pauline Hart	Civil Service Ladies; Sue Handscomb	Civil Service Ladies; Rosie Clugston
Women 2x	Kingston; Astrid Ayling & Pauline Hart		
Women 2-	Thames Tradesmen's; Lin Clark & Beryl Mitchell	Civil Service Ladies / Stuart Ladies; Liz Paton & Gill Webb	
Women 4+	Thames Tradesmen's; Jean Genchi, Clare Grove, Yvonne Earl, Chris Grimes, Zena Kitching (cox)	Civil Service Ladies; Nicola Boyes, Jackie Darling, Maggie Phillips, Barbara Jones, Wendy Stewart (cox)	
Women 4x	Civil Service Ladies / Thames / King James College; Sue Handscomb, Rosie Clugston, Beverly Jones, Stephanie Price	Civil Service Ladies; Jackie Darling, Maggie Phillips, Catti Moss, Sara Waters	

== Lightweight ==
=== Medal summary ===
Event	Gold	Silver	Bronze
Men 1x	Durham University		
Men 2x	Thames Tradesmen's / London		
Men 4-	London University		
Men 8+	Leander / London / Marlow / Thames Tradesmen's		

== Junior ==
=== Medal summary ===
Event	Gold	Silver	Bronze
Men 1x	Maidenhead		
Men 2-	Belmont Abbey School		
Men 2x	Guildford Stephen Chilmaid / Julian Scrivener		
Men 2+	Strode's College; Jeff Hunt, Paul Wensley,		
Men 4-	Eton College		Strode's College; Frank Fisher, Adrian Genziani, Ole Sylvest, Alex Alden
Men 4+	Eton College / St Edward's		
Men 4x	Hollingworth Lake / Marlow / Radley College / Rob Roy		
Men 8+	Hampton School / St Edward's / Berkhamsted School / Marlow / Wallingford		
Men J16 1x	North Staffordshire		
Men J16 2-	Thames Tradesmen's		
Men J16 2x	King's School Canterbury		Burway Rowing Club / Walton Rowing Club
Men J16 2+	Strodes College; Adrian Genziani, Ole Sylvest, Nigel Weare	Radley College	
Men J16 4+	Great Marlow School		
Men J16 4-	Thames Tradesmen's		
Men J16 8+	Royal Shrewsbury School	St Paul's School	Hampton School
Women 1x	Monmouth		
Women 4+	Abingdon		

== Veteran ==
=== Medal summary ===
Event	Gold	Silver	Bronze
Men 1x	Nottingham		
Men 4+	Marlow		

Key

Symbol	meaning
1, 2, 4, 8	crew size
+	coxed
-	coxless
x	sculls
14	Under-14
15	Under-15
16	Under-16
J	Junior
