= 1976 British Rowing Championships =

Fifth edition of the British Rowing Championships

- Venue: National Water Sports Centre
- Location: Holme Pierrepont (Nottingham)
- Dates: 16–18 July 1976

The 1976 National Rowing Championships was the fifth edition of the National Championships, held from 16–18 July 1976 at the National Water Sports Centre in Holme Pierrepont, Nottingham. The Championships did not feature any of the British Olympic team members who were in Canada at the time.

== Senior ==
=== Medal summary ===
Event	Gold	Silver	Bronze
Men Victor Ludorum	London	Leander	Thames Tradesmen's
Men 1x	Quintin; Graeme Mulcahy	Leander; Malcolm Carmichael	Peterborough City; Peter Zeun
Men 2+	Leander / Imperial College		
Men 2x	London		
Men 2-	Walton		
Men 4-	Thames Tradesmen's		
Men 4+	Thames Tradesmen's		
Men 4x	Tideway Scullers School		
Men 8+	Thames Tradesmen's	London	Henley
Women Victor Ludorum	Civil Service Ladies	Thames	Abingdon
Women 1x	Civil Service Ladies; Catti Moss		
Women 2x	Civil Service Ladies / Jessamy Scullers; Jackie Darling & Christine Davies		
Women 2-	Derby		Civil Service Ladies; Maggie Lambourn & Nicola Boyes
Women 4+	Civil Service Ladies		Civil Service Ladies; Catti Moss, Maggie Lambourn, Nicola Boyes, Sara Waters
Women 4x	Thames		

== Lightweight ==
=== Medal summary ===
Event	Gold	Silver	Bronze
Men 1x	Peterborough City; Peter Zeun		
Men 4-	London University		
Men 8+	London	Quintin Boat Club	

== Junior ==
=== Medal summary ===
Event	Gold	Silver	Bronze
Victor Ludorum	St Edward's	Radley College	Strode's College
Men 1x	Eton College	Strode's College; Kevin Swain	
Men 2-	St Edward's School		
Men 2x	Abingdon / John Mason High School		
Men 2+	King's School Chester		
Men 4-	Composite		
Men 4+	Wallingford Schools		
Men 4x	Composite		
Men 8+	Emanuel School		
Men J16 1x	Hackney Downs School		
Men J16 2-	St Edward's School		
Men J16 2x	Guildford RC, Stephen Chilmaid, Julian Scrivener		
Men J16 2+	St Edward's School	Strode's College; Carlo Genziani, Paul Lewis, Nigel Weare	
Men J16 4+	St Edward's School	Strode's College; Alex Alden, Carlo Genziani, Paul Lewis, Michael Swain, Nigel Weare	
Men J16 4-	St Edward's School		
Men J16 8+	Latymer Upper		
Women 1x	York City		
Women 4+	Abingdon		

Key

Symbol	meaning
1, 2, 4, 8	crew size
+	coxed
-	coxless
x	sculls
14	Under-14
15	Under-15
16	Under-16
J	Junior
