= Rowing at the 1980 Summer Olympics – Women's eight =

Women's eights at the Games of the XXII Olympiad
- Venue: Krylatskoye Sports Complex Canoeing and Rowing Basin
- Date: 21–26 July 1980
- Competitors: 54 from 6 nations
- Winning time: 3:03.32

Medalists
1st place, gold medalist(s)		Martina Boesler; Christiane Knetsch; Gabriele Kühn; Karin Metze; Kersten Neisser; Ilona Richter; Marita Sandig; Birgit Schütz; Marina Wilke (cox)	East Germany
2nd place, silver medalist(s)		Nina Frolova (cox); Maria Paziun; Olga Pivovarova; Nina Preobrazhenskaya; Nadezhda Prishchepa; Tatyana Stetsenko; Elena Tereshina; Nina Umanets; Valentina Zhulina	Soviet Union
3rd place, bronze medalist(s)		Angelica Aposteanu; Elena Bondar; Florica Bucur; Maria Constantinescu; Elena Dobrițoiu (cox); Rodica Frîntu; Ana Iliuță; Rodica Puscatu; Marlena Zagoni	Romania

The women's eights rowing competition at the 1980 Summer Olympics took place at Krylatskoye Sports Complex Canoeing and Rowing Basin, Moscow, Soviet Union. The event was held from 21 to 26 July.

== Heats ==
The fastest team in each heat advanced to the final. The remaining teams must compete in repechage for the remaining spots in the final.

=== Heat 1 ===
Rank	Rowers	Country	Time
1	Frolova, Paziun, Pivovarova, Preobrazhenskaya, Prishchepa, Stetsenko, Tereshina, Umanets, Zhulina	Soviet Union	3:11.72
2	Hodges, Toch, Sweet, Clark, Paton, Clugston, Boyes, Jones, Wright	Great Britain	3:18.18
3	Niebrzydowska, Lewandowska, Piatkowska, Kamuda, Modlińska, Soroka, Ambros, Kiełsznia, Różańska	Poland	3:25.15

=== Heat 2 ===
Rank	Rowers	Country	Time
1	Boesler, Knetsch, Kühn, Metze, Neisser, Richter, Sandig, Schütz, Wilke	East Germany	3:13.41
2	Aposteanu, Bondar, Bucur, Constantinescu, Dobritoiu, Frîntu, Iliuta, Puscatu, Zagoni	Romania	3:16.21
3	Stavreva, Koleva, Vasileva, Khristeva, Kostova, Karamandzhukova, Mincheva, Aleksandrova, Georgieva	Bulgaria	3:20.25

== Repechage ==
Three fastest teams in the repechage advanced to the final.

Rank	Rowers	Country	Time
1	Aposteanu, Bondar, Bucur, Constantinescu, Dobritoiu, Frîntu, Iliuta, Puscatu, Zagoni	Romania	3:10.24
2	Stavreva, Koleva, Vasileva, Khristeva, Kostova, Karamandzhukova, Mincheva, Aleksandrova, Georgieva	Bulgaria	3:15.49
3	Hodges, Toch, Sweet, Clark, Paton, Clugston, Boyes, Jones, Wright	Great Britain	3:15.77
4	Niebrzydowska, Lewandowska, Piatkowska, Kamuda, Modlinska, Soroka, Ambros, Kielsznia, Rózanska (cox)	Poland	3:24.04

== Final ==
Rank	Rowers	Country	Time
1	Boesler, Knetsch, Kühn, Metze, Neisser, Richter, Sandig, Schütz, Wilke (cox)	East Germany	3:03.32
2	Paziun, Pivovarova, Preobrazhenskaya, Prishchepa, Stetsenko, Tereshina, Umanets, Zhulina, Frolova (cox)	Soviet Union	3:04.29
3	Aposteanu, Bondar, Bucur, Constantinescu, Frîntu, Iliuta, Puscatu, Zagoni, Dobritoiu (cox)	Romania	3:05.63
4	Stavreva, Koleva, Vasileva, Khristeva, Kostova, Karamandzhukova, Mincheva, Aleksandrova, Georgieva (cox)	Bulgaria	3:10.03
5	Hodges, Toch, Sweet, Clark, Paton, Clugston, Boyes, Jones, Wright (cox)	Great Britain	3:13.85

== Sources ==
- The Official Report of the Games of the XXII Olympiad Moscow 1980 Volume Three (PDF) (PDF). p. 121. Archived from the original (PDF) on 27 September 2007.
