= Pauline Wright =

British rowing cox

Personal information
- Nationality: British
- Born: 2 December 1954 (age 70)

Sport
- Sport: Rowing
- Club: Civil Service Ladies

Pauline D Wright (born 2 December 1954) is a retired British rowing cox who competed at the 1976 Summer Olympics and the 1980 Summer Olympics.

== Rowing career ==
Wright participated in the 1974 World Rowing Championships in Lucerne which was the inaugural championships for women. Competing in the quadruple sculls event the crew were eliminated in the heats. She won a national title in the coxed four at the 1975 National Championships and she was part of the coxed four at the 1975 World Rowing Championships in Nottingham, the crew finished 9th overall after a third-place finish in the B final.

She was selected as cox for the Great Britain crew that competed in the women's coxed four at the 1976 Olympic Games in Montreal. The crew which consisted of Pauline Bird-Hart, Diana Bishop, Clare Grove and Gillian Webb finished in eighth place. Wright was part of the coxed fours crew, with Yvonne Earl, Maggie Phillips Nicola Boyes and Chris Grimes, that won the national title rowing for the Civil Service Ladies Rowing Club, at the 1977 National Championships. She also secured a silver medal in the quadruple sculls. She was consequently selected for Great Britain in the coxed fours with Earl, Phillips, Boyes and Grimes at the 1977 World Rowing Championships in Amsterdam.

In 1980 she coxed the women's eight that was selected to go to the Olympic Games in Moscow, the crew which contained Nicola Boyes, Gill Hodges, Joanna Toch, Penny Sweet, Lin Clark, Elizabeth Paton, Rosie Clugston and Beverly Jones finished in fifth place. She was part of the eight that won the national title rowing for Great Britain senior squad boat at the 1981 National Championships.
