= Beverly Jones =

British rower

Personal information
- Nationality: British
- Born: 25 November 1956 (age 69)

Sport
- Sport: Rowing
- Club: Thames RC; Upper Thames RC

Beverly Ann Jones (born 25 November 1956) is a retired British rower who competed at the 1980 Summer Olympics.

== Rowing career ==
Jones won the quadruple sculls event, with Rosie Clugston, Jane Curry, Sue Handscomb and E Morris (cox), at the 1977 National Championships. Consequently she was selected in the quad boat for the 1977 World Rowing Championships for Great Britain. In 1978 she won quadruple sculls again at the 1978 National Championships before rowing in a second World Championships in 1979.

She was selected to represent Great Britain in the women's eight event at the 1980 Olympic Games in Montreal. The crew which consisted of Gill Hodges, Joanna Toch, Penny Sweet, Lin Clark, Elizabeth Paton, Rosie Clugston, Nicola Boyes and Pauline Wright (cox) finished in fifth place.

She was part of the eight that won the national title rowing for Great Britain senior squad boat at the 1981 National Championships and a third World Championship appearance ensued at the 1981 World Rowing Championships in Munich. She part of the composite quadruple sculls crew, that won the national title, at the 1983 National Rowing Championships.
