= Barnes Bridge Ladies Rowing Club =

Rowing club in West London

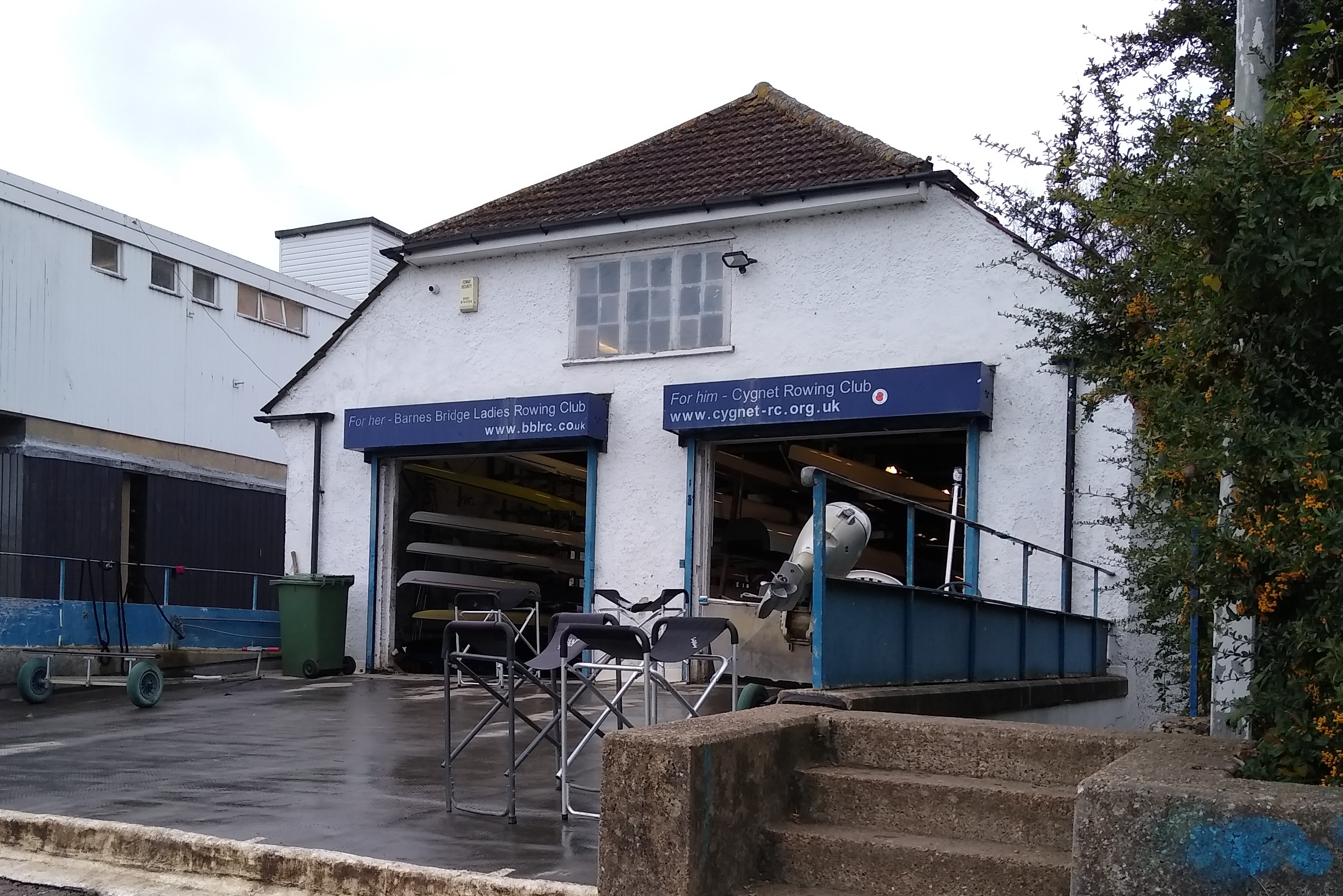

- Boathouse shared by Barnes Bridge Ladies Rowing Club (left) and Cygnet Rowing Club
- Location: Civil Service Sports Club Boathouse, Dukes Meadows, Chiswick, West London
- Coordinates: 51.474004°N 0.253971°W
- Affiliations: British Rowing (boat code BBL)
- Website: www.bblrc.co.uk

Barnes Bridge Ladies Rowing Club is a rowing club on the River Thames, based at the Civil Service Sports Club Boathouse, Dukes Meadows, Chiswick, West London.

== History ==
The club was originally called the Civil Service Ladies Rowing Association soon merging its boats from different departments as the Civil Service Ladies Rowing Club. It was for members of almost all central government departments and agencies. Mentions appear of it in press as early as 1928.

By 1975 half of a World Championship eight was picked from the club to represent Great Britain at Holme Pierrepont National Watersports Centre – their boat becoming a large picture feature of a local newspaper. These were Ann Cork, Jackie Darling, Susan "Sue" Handscomb and Margaret "Maggie" Lambourn. Two of the coxed four and the cox also were chosen from the club. All apart from Handscomb did likewise in Lucerne in 1974.

In 1997 it was renamed the Barnes Bridge Ladies Rowing Club as membership has become open to everyone. The club is affiliated to British Rowing and the combined club/boathouse is shared with Cygnet Rowing Club.

== Notable members ==
- Nicola Boyes
- Lin Clark
- Rosie Clugston
- Jackie Darling
- Clare Grove
- Sue Handscomb
- Maggie Lambourn
- Liz Monti
- Catti Moss
- Liz Paton
- Pauline Wright

The club produced multiple British champions as the Civil Service Ladies (CSLRC).

== Honours ==
=== British champions (as CSLRC) ===
Year	Winning crew/s
1973	4+
1974	Victor Ludorum, 2-, 4+, 4x
1975	Victor Ludorum, 2x, 2-, 4+, 4x
1976	Victor Ludorum, 1x, 2x, 4+
1977	2-, 4+, 4x
1978	4x
1979	2-

== See also ==
- Rowing on the River Thames
