= 1979 British Rowing Championships =

- Venue: National Water Sports Centre
- Location: Holme Pierrepont (Nottingham)
- Dates: 20–21 July 1979

The 1979 National Rowing Championships was the eighth edition of the National Championships, held from 20–21 July 1979 at the National Water Sports Centre in Holme Pierrepont, Nottingham.

== Senior ==
=== Medal summary ===
Event	Gold	Silver	Bronze
Men 1x	Nottingham		
Men 2+	Newark		
Men 2x	Leander / Thames Tradesmen's		
Men 2-	Leander		
Men 4-	Molesey / Maidenhead		
Men 4+	Kingston		
Men 4x	Composite		
Men 8+	Composite (London/Thames Tradesmen)	Leander Club	Junior composite (Strode's College/Wallingford RC/Wallingford Sch/KCS Wimbledon/Cheltenham Coll/Forest School/Eton Coll); Mike Holloway, Rob Humphreys, Adrian Genziani, Paul Wensley, Richard Counihan, Crispin Maby, Steve King, Robert Clay, Nigel Weare
Women 1x	Thames Tradesmen's; Beryl Mitchell	Derby; Lesley Titterton	Civil Service Ladies; Jackie Darling
Women 2x	Kingston; Astrid Ayling & Pauline Hart		
Women 2-	Civil Service Ladies / Thames; Julia Corbin & Jane Curry	York City	Not awarded
Women 4+	Composite; Yvonne Earl, Bernadette Casey, Lin Clark, Gill Webb, Nicky Mason	Weybridge Ladies	
Women 4x+	Composite; Lin Clark, Beryl Mitchell, Astrid Ayling, Pauline Hart, Nicky Mason		
Women 8+	A.R.A squad A Nicola Boyes	A.R.A squad B	Nottingham

== Lightweight ==
=== Medal summary ===
Event	Gold	Silver	Bronze
Men 1x	Leander		
Men 2x	City Orient		
Men 4-	London / Thames Tradesmen's		
Men 8+	Composite		

== Junior ==
=== Medal summary ===
Event	Gold	Silver	Bronze
Men 1x	Marlow		
Men 2-	Berkhamsted School		
Men 2x	Hollingworth Lake		
Men 2+	Wallingford Schools		
Men 4-	Thames Tradesmen's		
Men 4+	Composite		
Men 4x	Composite		
Men 8+	Composite (Wallingford/Wallingford Sch/ Strodes Coll/KCS Wimbledon/Cheltenham Coll/Forest School/Eton Coll); Mike Holloway, Robert Humphreys, Adrian Genziani, Paul Wensley, Richard Counihan, Crispin Maby, Steve King, Robert Clay, Nigel Weare	King's Sch Chester	
Men J16 1x	Bewdley		
Men J16 2-	City Orient		
Men J16 2x	Royal Shrewsbury School		
Men J16 2+	Merchant Taylor's School		
Men J16 4+	Wallingford Schools		
Men J16 4-	City Orient		
Men J16 8+	Royal Shrewsbury School		
Women 1x	Nottingham		
Women 2x	Thames		
Women 2-	Stuart Ladies		
Women 4+	Weybridge Ladies		
Women 8+	Weybridge Ladies		

Key

Symbol	meaning
1, 2, 4, 8	crew size
+	coxed
-	coxless
x	sculls
14	Under-14
15	Under-15
16	Under-16
J	Junior
