= ULBC =

ULBC is an abbreviation that may refer to:

- University of Leicester Boat Club the rowing club of the University of Leicester, England
- University of London Boat Club the rowing club of the University of London
