= Iliuță =

Iliuță is a Romanian masculine given name and a surname. Notable people with the name include:

- Ana Iliuță (born 1958), Romanian rower
- Iliuţă Dăscălescu (born 1972), Romanian wrestler
