= Handscomb =

Handscomb is a surname. Notable people with the surname include:

- Peter Handscomb (born 1991), Australian cricketer
- Sue Handscomb (born 1956), British rower
