= 1982 British Rowing Championships =

- Venue: National Water Sports Centre
- Location: Holme Pierrepont (Nottingham)
- Dates: 17–18 July 1982

The 1982 National Rowing Championships was the 11th edition of the National Championships, held from 17 to 18 July 1982 at the National Water Sports Centre in Holme Pierrepont, Nottingham.

== Senior ==
=== Medal summary ===
Event	Gold	Silver	Bronze
Men Victor Ludorum	London		
Men 1x	Kingston; Tim Crooks		
Men 2+	Tyrian / London University; Richard Budgett, Tom Cadoux-Hudson, Adrian Ellison		
Men 2x	Lea		
Men 2-	London; Neil Christie & James MacLeod	Tyrian / London University; Paul Wensley & Paul Reynolds	John Beattie & Andy Holmes
Men 4-	A.R.A Composite	Tyrian / London University	Thames Tradesmen's
Men 4+	Tyrian / London University; Richard Budgett, Tom Cadoux-Hudson, Steve King, Geraint Fuller, Adrian Ellison		
Men 4x	A.R.A Composite		
Men 8+	A.R.A Composite		
Whitbread Sprint	Thames Tradesmen's		
Women Victor Ludorum	Thames		
Women 1x	Thames Tradesmen's; Beryl Mitchell		
Women 2x	Kingston / Borough Road College; Astrid Ayling & Rosie Clugston		
Women 2-	Thames Tradesmen's / Tideway Scullers School; Lin Clark & Gill Hodges	London University; Nicola Boyes & Kate McNicol	
Women 4+	A.R.A Composite	Lea	
Women 4x	Nottingham and Becket Schools		
Women 8+	A.R.A Composite; Alexa Forbes, Belinda Holmes, Melanie Holmes, Pauline Janson, Kate Panter, Sally Bloomfield, Jo Toch, Jane Cross, Zena Kitching (cox)	Composite; Katie Ball, Gill Parker, Nicola Boyes, Kate McNicol, Lin Clark, Beryl Mitchell, Clare Carpenter, Jean Genchi, Sean Bolton (cox)	

== Lightweight ==
=== Medal summary ===
Event	Gold	Silver	Bronze
Men 1x	London		
Men 2x	Wallingford / London Rowing Club		
Men 4-	London		
Men 8+	London		

== Junior ==
=== Medal summary ===
Event	Gold	Silver	Bronze
Victor Ludorum	Eton College		
Men 1x	Poplar		
Men 2-	Christchurch / Hollingworth Lake		
Men 2x	St Ives		
Men 2+	Abingdon / Wallingford		
Men 4-	Marlow / Shiplake College		
Men 4+	Eton College		
Men 4x	Lea		
Men 8+	Composite		
Men J16 1x	Weybridge		
Men J16 2-	Shiplake College		
Men J16 2x	St Ives		
Men J16 2+	Eton College		
Men J16 4+	Hollingworth Lake		
Men J16 4-	Cheltenham College		
Men J16 8+	Eton College		
Men J14 4x	Hampton School / Weybridge		
Women Victor Ludorum	Weybridge Ladies		
Women 1x	Kingston		
Women 2x	Weybridge Ladies		
Women 2-	Lea		
Women 4+	Abingdon / Strodes / Weybridge Ladies		
Women 8+	Weybridge Ladies		

Key

Symbol	meaning
1, 2, 4, 8	crew size
+	coxed
-	coxless
x	sculls
14	Under-14
15	Under-15
16	Under-16
J	Junior
