= Christine Grimes (rower) =

British rower

Sport
- Sport: Rowing
- Club: Civil Service Ladies Rowing Club

Christine Grimes is a retired rower who competed for Great Britain.

== Rowing career ==
Grimes won a British title in 1973 when winning the coxed four at the 1973 British Rowing Championships rowing for the Civil Service Ladies Rowing Club.

In 1974 she won a second British title at the 1974 British Rowing Championships and was consequently selected by Great Britain for the 1974 World Rowing Championships in Lucerne which was the inaugural championships for women. Competing in the coxed four event the crew finished 11th overall after a fifth-place finish in the B final.

She won a third British title at the 1977 British Rowing Championships and consequently was part of the coxed four that finished 9th overall and fourth in the B final at the 1977 World Rowing Championships in Amsterdam.
