= Graeme Mulcahy (rower) =

Personal information
- Born: Third quarter 1946 Sunderland

Sport
- Sport: Rowing
- Club: Quintin Boat Club

Graeme A Mulcahy (born 1946) is a rower who competed for Great Britain.

== Rowing career ==
Mulcahy was selected by Great Britain as part of the quadruple sculls with Tom Bishop, Mark Hayter and Richard Finlay at the 1975 World Rowing Championships, the crew reached the final. In 1976 he was the British single sculls champion when rowing for the Quintin Boat Club at the 1976 British Rowing Championships and the Wingfield Sculls champion. In 1977 he was part of the quad scull that finished 7th overall after winning the B final at the 1977 World Rowing Championships in Amsterdam.
