= Krystyna Ambros =

Polish rower

Personal information
- Nationality: Polish
- Born: 13 March 1961 (age 64); Lipka, Poland

Sport
- Sport: Rowing

Krystyna Ambros (born 13 March 1961) is a Polish rower. She competed in the women's eight event at the 1980 Summer Olympics.
