= Stefka Koleva =

Bulgarian rower

Personal information
- Nationality: Bulgarian
- Born: 9 January 1954 (age 71)

Sport
- Sport: Rowing

Stefka Koleva (born 9 January 1954) is a Bulgarian rower. She competed in the women's eight event at the 1980 Summer Olympics.
