= Urszula Niebrzydowska =

Polish rower

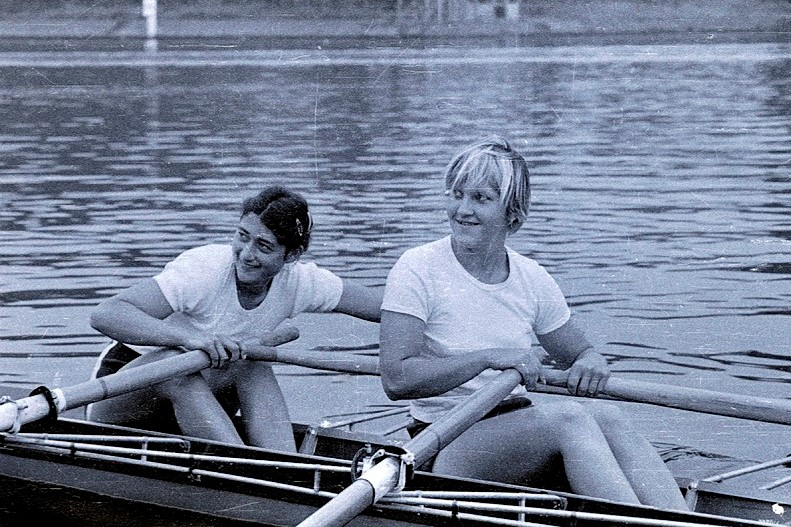
- Niebrzydowska with Wiesława Kiełsznia

Personal information
- Nationality: Polish
- Born: 21 October 1961 (age 63); Gdańsk, Poland

Sport
- Sport: Rowing

Urszula Niebrzydowska (born 21 October 1961) is a Polish rower. She competed in the women's eight event at the 1980 Summer Olympics.
