= Grażyna Różańska =

Polish rower

Personal information
- Nationality: Polish
- Born: 27 November 1961 (age 63); Wałcz, Poland

Sport
- Sport: Rowing

Grażyna Różańska (born 27 November 1961) is a Polish rowing cox. She competed in the women's eight event at the 1980 Summer Olympics.
