= Ewa Lewandowska =

Polish rower

Personal information
- Nationality: Polish
- Born: 4 September 1961 (age 63); Gorzów Wielkopolski, Poland

Sport
- Sport: Rowing

Ewa Lewandowska (born 4 September 1961) is a Polish rower. She competed in the women's eight event at the 1980 Summer Olympics.
