= Wiesława Kiełsznia =

Polish rower

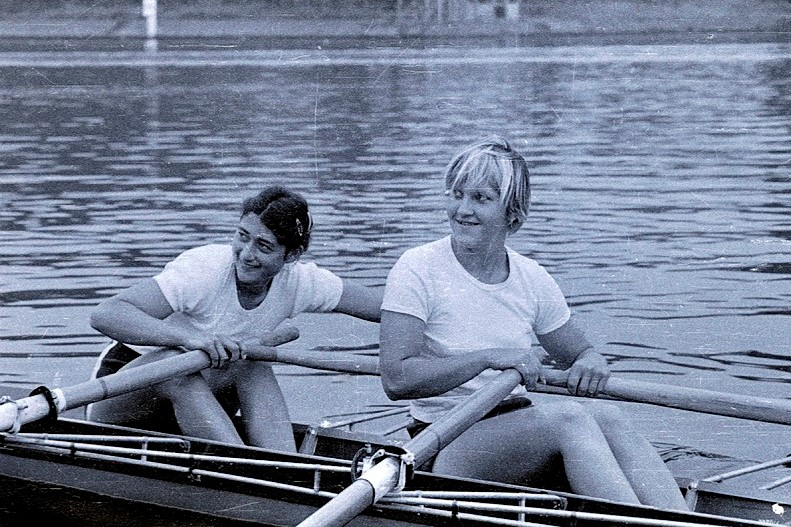
- Urszula Niebrzydowska-Janikowska and Wiesława Kiełsznia-Buksińska, 1982.

Personal information
- Nationality: Polish
- Born: 1 June 1961 (age 63); Gdańsk, Poland

Sport
- Sport: Rowing

Wiesława Kiełsznia (born 1 June 1961) is a Polish rower. She competed in the women's eight event at the 1980 Summer Olympics.
