= Hollingworth Lake Rowing Club =

British rowing club

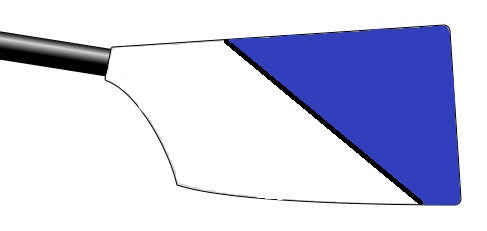
- Location: The Clubhouse, Lake Bank, Littleborough, Greater Manchester, England
- Coordinates: 53.631452°N 2.101443°W
- Founded: 1872
- Affiliations: British Rowing boat code - HOL
- Website: www.hollingworthlakerowingclub.co.uk

Hollingworth Lake Rowing Club is a rowing club on Hollingworth Lake and based at The Clubhouse, Lake Bank, Littleborough, Greater Manchester, England.

== History ==
The club was founded in 1872 following a meeting at Mr Yarwood's Lake Hotel. The current clubhouse was built in 1972.

The club has produced multiple British champions since 1978.

== Honours ==
=== British champions ===
Year	Winning crew
1978	Men J18 4x composite
1979	Men J18 2x
1982	Men J18 2- composite, Men J16 4+
1983	Men J16 2x
1992	Women 4x composite
2001	WJ14 2x
2005	WJ18 1x
2007	WJ18 2x composite
2009	OJ18 2x composite, WJ14 1x
2010	Women J15 1x
2013	W4x composite
