= Beata Kamuda =

Polish rower (1960–2024)

Personal information
- Full name: Beata Janina Kamuda-Dudzińska
- Born: 12 July 1960 Gardeja, Poland
- Died: 2 July 2024 (aged 63)
- Height: 183 cm (6 ft 0 in)
- Weight: 73 kg (161 lb)

Sport
- Country: Poland
- Sport: Rowing
- Club: Wisła Grudziądz

Beata Janina Kamuda-Dudzińska (12 July 1960 – 2 July 2024) was a Polish rower. She competed in the women's eight event at the 1980 Summer Olympics. Kamuda died on 2 July 2024, at the age of 64.
