= Daniela Stavreva =

Bulgarian rower (born 1958)

Personal information
- Nationality: Bulgarian
- Born: 26 August 1958 (age 66)

Sport
- Sport: Rowing

Daniela Stavreva (Bulgarian: Даниела Ставрева; born 26 August 1958) is a Bulgarian rower. She competed in the women's eight event at the 1980 Summer Olympics.
