= Di Ellis =

Personal information
- Full name: Diana Margaret Ellis
- Nationality: British
- Born: 11 April 1938
- Died: 18 May 2017 (aged 79)
- Education: Ealing girls' school and Guildford College of Technology

Sport
- Sport: Rowing

Dame Diana Margaret Ellis DBE (11 April 1938 – 18 May 2017), known as Di Ellis, was a British rower and the former Honorary President of British Rowing.

== Rowing career ==
Ellis coxed the women's eight at the 1966 European Rowing Championships for Great Britain. She coxed the England women's four to gold in the 1972 home countries match, and won the women's eight head of the river race seven times, four as a cox and three as a rower, from 1966-1973. She won the coxed fours with Janis Long, Ann Shackell, Margaret Goodsman, and Beryl Martin, rowing for the St George's Ladies crew, at the inaugural 1972 National Rowing Championships, on the new 2,000-metre course at Holme Pierrepont.

== Family ==
She was the middle child of three daughters born to Robert Hall, a proofreader, and his wife, Mabel (née Steadman), a nurse. She attended Ealing girls' school (West London), and the Guildford College of Technology (in Surrey).

== Honours ==
Ellis was appointed CBE for services to rowing in 2004, and elevated to Dame Commander of the Order of the British Empire (DBE) in the Queen's Birthday Honours List of 2013. She was made a vice-president of the British Olympic Association in 2013 and honorary president of British Rowing in 2014.

== Death ==
Ellis died following a brief illness at the age of 79. She was survived by her husband (since 1966) and daughter.

== Affiliations ==
- British Olympic Association
- Sport & Recreation Alliance
- British Confederation of Sport
- Skills Active
- Sporting Equals and Sports Resolutions
