= 1977 British Rowing Championships =

- Venue: National Water Sports Centre
- Location: Holme Pierrepont (Nottingham)
- Dates: 15–17 July 1977

The 1977 National Rowing Championships was the sixth edition of the National Championships, held from 15–17 July 1977 at the National Water Sports Centre in Holme Pierrepont, Nottingham. London won the John Player Trophy (men's Victor Ludorum) and Thames won the Charlton Cup (women's Victor Ludorum).

== Senior ==
=== Medal summary ===
Event	Gold	Silver	Bronze
Men Victor Ludorum	London		
Men 1x	Abingdon; Ian Marriott		
Men 2+	London; Neil Christie, James MacLeod, David Webb		
Men 2x	Poplar		
Men 2-	London; Neil Christie & James MacLeod		
Men 4-	London		
Men 4+	London University		
Men 4x	Leander / Marlow / Quintin		
Men 8+	Leander		
Women Victor Ludorum	Thames		
Women 1x	Kingston; Astrid Ayling	Kingston; Pauline Hart	Bristol Ariel; Stephanie Price
Women 2x	Kingston; Astrid Ayling & Pauline Hart		
Women 2-	Civil Service Ladies / St George's; Lin Clark & Beryl Mitchell	Civil Service Ladies / Stuart Ladies; Clare Grove, Gill Webb	
Women 4+	Civil Service Ladies; Yvonne Earl, Maggie Phillips, Nicola Boyes, Chris Grimes, Pauline Wright (cox)		
Women 4x	Civil Service Ladies / Thames / Stratford-upon-Avon; Rosie Clugston, Jane Curry, Sue Handscomb, Beverly Jones, E Morris (cox)	Civil Service Ladies /St George's / Stuart Ladies; Lin Clark, Beryl Mitchell, Clare Grove, Gill Webb, Pauline Wright (cox)	

== Lightweight ==
=== Medal summary ===
Event	Gold	Silver	Bronze
Men 1x	Staines		
Men 2x	Nottingham & Union / Nottingham		
Men 4-	London University		
Men 8+	London		

== Junior ==
=== Medal summary ===
Event	Gold	Silver	Bronze
Men 1x	Poplar		
Men 2-	Bedford Modern School		
Men 2x	St Ives / Bedford		
Men 2+	Eton College		
Men 4-	Hampton School / Kingston		
Men 4+	St Edward's School		
Men 4x	Guildford / Maidenhead / Weybridge Stephen Chilmaid, Mark Shimmin, Ian Shore, Julian Scrivener)|| ||		
Men 8+	Shrewsbury School / Hereford / Eton College / Hampton School / Abingdon / Bedford Modern School		
Men J16 1x	Rob Roy		
Men J16 2-	Marlow		
Men J16 2x	Walton		
Men J16 2+	King's School Canterbury		
Men J16 4+	Maidenhead		
Men J16 4-	St Edward's School		
Men J16 8+	Eton College		
Women 1x	Thames		
Women 4+	King James' College / Upper Thames		

== Veteran ==
=== Medal summary ===
Event	Gold	Silver	Bronze
Men 1x	Nottingham		
Men 4+	City of Sheffield		

Key

Symbol	meaning
1, 2, 4, 8	crew size
+	coxed
-	coxless
x	sculls
14	Under-14
15	Under-15
16	Under-16
J	Junior
