= Rodica Arba =

Romanian rower

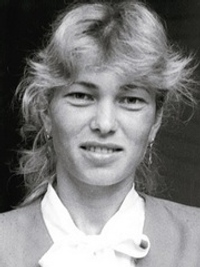
- Arba in the 1980s

Personal information
- Born: 5 May 1962 (age 64) Petricani, Romania
- Height: 179 cm (5 ft 10 in)
- Weight: 75 kg (165 lb)

Sport
- Sport: Rowing
- Club: CS Dinamo București
Medal record
Representing Romania
Olympic Games
Bronze medal – third place	1980 Moscow	Eight
Gold medal – first place	1984 Los Angeles	Coxless pair
Gold medal – first place	1988 Seoul	Coxless pair
Silver medal – second place	1988 Seoul	Eight
World Championships
Bronze medal – third place	1981 Munich	Coxless pair
Bronze medal – third place	1982 Lucerne	Coxed four
Silver medal – second place	1983 Dusiburg	Coxless pair
Gold medal – first place	1985 Hazewinkel	Coxless pair
Gold medal – first place	1986 Nottingham	Coxless pair
Gold medal – first place	1987 Copenhagen	Coxless pair
Gold medal – first place	1987 Copenhagen	Eight

Rodica Arba (née Puşcatu; born 5 May 1962) is a retired Romanian rower. She competed at the 1980, 1984 and 1988 Olympics and won two gold, one silver, and one bronze medal. At the world championships she won four gold, one silver and two bronze medals between 1981 and 1987, mostly in coxless pairs.

Arba was born in 1962 in Petricani, Neamț County, Romania. She cites Sanda Toma as her rowing inspiration.

She went to the 1980 Summer Olympics as a member of the Romanian women's eight, and won a bronze medal with the team. In the 1981 season, she competed in the coxless pair with team member Elena Horvat, and they won bronze at the 1981 World Rowing Championships at Oberschleißheim near Munich, Germany. At the 1982 World Rowing Championships, she was a member of the women's coxed four team that won a bronze medal. At the 1983 World Rowing Championships, Horvat and Arba won silver in the women's pair. The same crew won gold at the 1984 Summer Olympics in Los Angeles. She gained the 1985 World Rowing Championships title with Horvat, and won the 1986 and 1987 World Rowing Championships with Olga Homeghi. At the 1987 World Rowing Championships, she also competed with the women's eight, and won a second title at that event.

At the 1988 Summer Olympics in Seoul, Korea, Arba won gold in the women's pair with Homeghi, and silver with the women's eight.

After the Seoul Olympics, Arba became pregnant, and this finished her rowing career. Her son, Iulian Arba, was born on 20 July 1989; this was to be her only child. He later competed for Romania in rowing, and moved to elite level in 2009 when he competed at the 2009 European Rowing Championships with the men's eight. Her son accidentally electrocuted himself while fishing in 2015.
