= Jolanta Modlińska =

Polish rower

Personal information
- Nationality: Polish
- Born: 23 June 1960 (age 64); Poznań, Poland

Sport
- Sport: Rowing

Jolanta Modlińska (born 23 June 1960) is a Polish rower. She competed in the women's eight event at the 1980 Summer Olympics.
