= Mariana Mincheva =

Bulgarian rower

Personal information
- Nationality: Bulgarian
- Born: 6 November 1959 (age 65)

Sport
- Sport: Rowing

Mariana Mincheva (born 6 November 1959) is a Bulgarian rower. She competed in the women's eight event at the 1980 Summer Olympics.
