= Valentina Aleksandrova =

Bulgarian rower

Personal information
- Nationality: Bulgarian
- Born: 14 January 1962 (age 63)

Sport
- Sport: Rowing

Valentina Aleksandrova (Bulgarian: Валентина Александрова) (born 14 January 1962) is a Bulgarian rower. She competed in the women's eight event at the 1980 Summer Olympics.
