= St Ives Rowing Club =

British rowing club

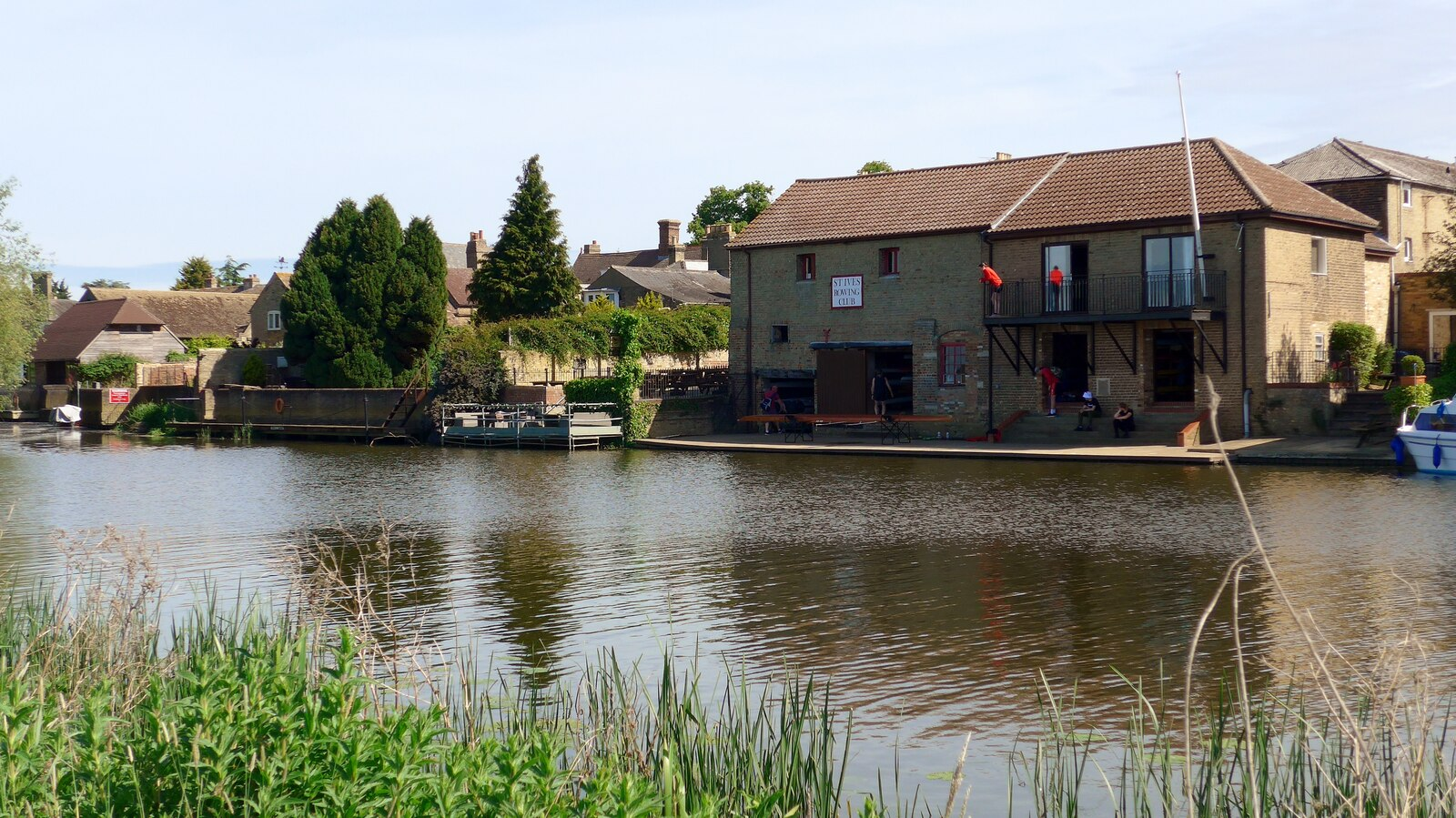

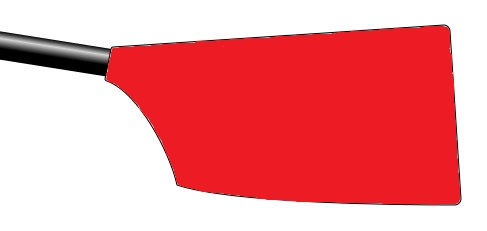
- Location: 25 The Broadway, St Ives, Cambridgeshire
- Coordinates: 52.324449°N 0.076830°W
- Founded: 1865
- Affiliations: British Rowing (boat code SIV)
- Website: stivesrowingclub.co.uk

St Ives Rowing Club is a rowing club on the River Great Ouse, based at 25 The Broadway, St Ives, Cambridgeshire. The colours are together: red and black.

== History ==
The club was founded in 1865 by a local general practitioner called Dr Grove.

The club has produced some British champions, with a 1975 to 1991 recent peak.

== Honours ==
=== British champions ===
Year	Winning crew/s
1975	Men J16 2x
1977	Men J18 2x
1981	Men J18 2x
1982	Men J18 2x, Men J16 2x
1986	Men L2x
1987	Open J13 1x
1990	Men L1x
1991	Men L1x

== Notable members ==
- Tony Cowley
- Nigel Drake
