= Teresa Soroka =

Polish rower

Personal information
- Nationality: Polish
- Born: 11 August 1960 (age 64); Wałcz, Poland

Sport
- Sport: Rowing

Teresa Soroka (born 11 August 1960) is a Polish rower. She competed in the women's eight event at the 1980 Summer Olympics.
