= Snezhka Khristeva =

Bulgarian rower

Personal information
- Nationality: Bulgarian
- Born: 30 March 1959 (age 65)

Sport
- Sport: Rowing

Snezhka Khristeva (Bulgarian: Снежка Христева; born 30 March 1959) is a Bulgarian rower. She competed in the women's eight event at the 1980 Summer Olympics.
