= Veneta Karamandzhukova =

Bulgarian rower

Personal information
- Nationality: Bulgarian
- Born: 28 March 1962 (age 63)

Sport
- Sport: Rowing

Veneta Karamandzhukova (Bulgarian: Венета Караманджукова; born 28 March 1962) is a Bulgarian rower. She competed in the women's eight event at the 1980 Summer Olympics.
