= Beryl Crockford =

British rower

Personal information
- Born: Beryl Martin; 26 June 1950
- Died: 11 September 2016 (aged 66) Westmead Hospital, Sydney
- Spouse: Duncan

Sport
- Country: Great Britain
- Sport: Women's Rowing
- Club: St George's Ladies RC; Thames Tradesmen RC; Sons of the Thames RC; Leander Club
Medal record
Women's rowing
Representing Great Britain
World Rowing Championships
Gold medal – first place	1985 Hazewinkel	Lightweight double sculls
Silver medal – second place	1981 Munich	Single sculls
- Updated on 12 September 2016

Beryl Crockford (formerly Mitchell; née Martin; 26 June 1950 – 11 September 2016) was a world-champion and Olympic rower who represented Great Britain from 1975 to 1986. In 1985 she married Duncan Crockford and competed as Beryl Crockford afterwards, previously she had competed under her divorced name of Beryl Mitchell.

== Representative rowing career ==
She was part of the coxed four at the 1975 World Rowing Championships in Nottingham, the crew finished 9th overall after a third-place finish in the B final. In the 1976 Olympics she rowed with Lin Clark in the women's coxless pairs and in 1977 she was part of the coxless pair that finished 10th overall and fourth in the B final at the 1977 World Rowing Championships in Amsterdam.

At the 1980 Olympics and the 1984 Olympics she rowed in the women's single sculls. Her silver medal in women's single sculls in the 1981 World Rowing Championships was the first medal achieved by a British woman at a World Rowing Championships, and her win with Lin Clark in the women's lightweight double sculls at the 1985 World Rowing Championships was the first gold medal for a British women's crew at any championships. She represented England in the lightweight single sculls, at the 1986 Commonwealth Games in Edinburgh, Scotland. She represented Great Britain at three Olympic Games and eight World Championships in total.

== Club rowing ==
As Beryl Martin she won the coxed fours with Janis Long, Ann Shackell, Margaret Goodsman and Di Ellis, rowing for the St George's Ladies crew, at the inaugural 1972 National Rowing Championships. She won the coxed fours at the 1975 National Championships and the while rowing for the St George's Ladies Rowing Club she won the coxless pairs with Lin Clark, at the 1977 National Rowing Championships.

At the 1978 National Championships when rowing for the Thames Tradesmen's Rowing Club she won the coxless pairs title with Clark and one year later at the 1979 National Championships she was part of the composite crew that won the quadruple sculls. She was the single sculls champion, at the 1981 National Rowing Championships and the 1982 National Rowing Championships Also in 1982, when women's invitational events were introduced to Henley Royal Regatta, Mitchell won the inaugural single sculls.

A third consecutive single sculls title was won at the 1983 National Rowing Championships. She was part of the double sculls crew with Lin Clark that won the national title in a dead-heat with Bradford Amateur Rowing Club, rowing for Sons of the Thames, at the 1985 National Championships. The race was the first dead heat for winners since the start of the Championships.

== Teaching and coaching ==
Crockford trained as a dance teacher at Chelsea College of Physical Education Eastbourne before turning to physical education, teaching and college lecturing even during her competitive career. She was the first female member nominated for membership of Leander Club when the club voted in April 1997 to admit women members (after 179 years a male-only club). In the 1990s she coached Lady Eleanor Holles School to be the most successful junior women's rowing club in the country, and in 2013 she was reported to be coaching the Ancient Mariners squad, a masters crew who row from the Drummoyne Rowing Club in Sydney. For a number of years before her death she was the head coach of rowing at Sydney Boys High School and coached the school's 1st VIII.

== Death ==
On 11 September 2016, Crockford succumbed to injuries she sustained after crashing into a parked car whilst cycling in the precinct of Sydney Olympic Park.
