= Elena Tereshina =

Soviet rower

Medal record

Women's rowing

Representing the Soviet Union

Olympic Games
Silver medal – second place	1980 Moscow	Eight

World Rowing Championships
Gold medal – first place	1978 Karapiro	Eight
Gold medal – first place	1979 Bled	Eight
Gold medal – first place	1981 Munich	Eight
Gold medal – first place	1982 Lucerne	Eight
Gold medal – first place	1983 Duisburg	Eight
Gold medal – first place	1985 Hazewinkel	Eight
Gold medal – first place	1986 Nottingham	Eight
Bronze medal – third place	1987 Copenhagen	Eight

Elena Borisovna Tereshina (Russian: Елена Борисовна Терёшина, born 6 February 1959 in Kiev) is a Ukrainian rower. She competed in the eight for the Soviet Union at the 1980 Summer Olympics where she won the silver medal. Tereshina also won seven gold medals at the World Rowing Championships.
