= Nina Umanets =

Ukrainian rower (born 1956)

Medal record

Women's rowing

Representing the Soviet Union

Olympic Games
| Silver medal – second place | 1980 Moscow | Eight |

World Rowing Championships
| Gold medal – first place | 1978 Karapiro | Eight |
| Gold medal – first place | 1979 Bled | Eight |
| Gold medal – first place | 1981 Munich | Eight |
| Gold medal – first place | 1982 Lucerne | Eight |
| Gold medal – first place | 1983 Duisburg | Eight |
| Silver medal – second place | 1977 Amsterdam | Eight |

Nina Dmitriyevna Umanets (Russian: Нина Дмитриевна Уманец, born 1 May 1956 in Tulchyn Raion, Vinnytsia Oblast) is a Ukrainian rower. She competed in the women's eight for the Soviet Union at the 1980 Summer Olympics where she won the silver medal. Umanets also won five gold medals at the World Rowing Championships.

In 2014, she worked as Deputy Minister of Sports of Ukraine with Dmytro Bulatov.
