= Angelica Aposteanu =

Romanian rower (born 1954)

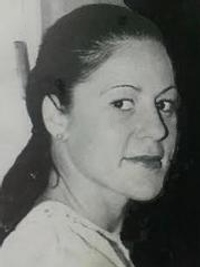

Personal information
- Born: 21 August 1954 (age 71)
- Height: 175 cm (5 ft 9 in)
- Weight: 67 kg (148 lb)

Sport
- Sport: Rowing
- Club: CSA Steaua Bucharest
Medal record
Representing Romania
Olympic Games
Bronze medal – third place	1980 Moscow	Eight
World Championships
Bronze medal – third place	1974 Lucerne	Coxed four
Bronze medal – third place	1975 Nottingham	Coxless pairs

Angelica Aposteanu (later Chertic, born 21 August 1954) is a retired Romanian rower. She won three bronze medals in three different events at the 1974 and 1975 world championships and 1980 Olympics.
