= University of London Boat Club =

British rowing club

- Location: Chiswick, London, England
- Coordinates: 51.482°N 0.275°W
- Home water: Tideway
- Founded: 1921
- University: University of London
- Affiliations: British Rowing boat code – ULO
- Website: www.ulbc.co.uk

University of London Boat Club (ULBC; boat code ULO) is the rowing club for the University of London and its member institutions, many of which also have their own boat clubs. The club has its boathouse on the Thames in Chiswick, London, UK. It is a designated High-Performance Programme funded by British Rowing.

== History ==
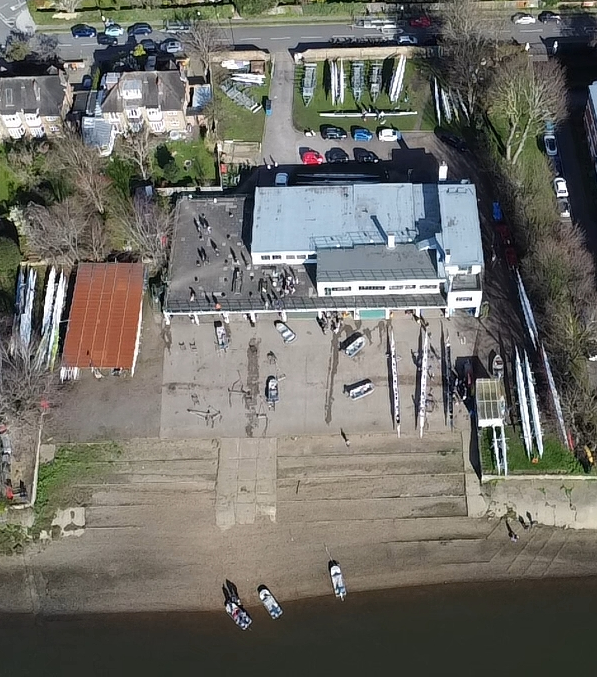
University of London Boat Club

The University of London Boat Club was formed in 1921.

=== Olympians & Paralympians ===
ULBC has been represented at every Olympic Games since 1960:

- 1960 Rome – Coxed Pair: S.Farquharson, J.R. Reeves
- 1964 Tokyo – Coxless Pair: S.Farquharson, J.D.Lee
- 1968 Mexico – Eight: M.M.K.Cooper, B.L.A.Carter, M.Malpass, R.D.Yarrow, P.G.Knapp, P.J.Wright, A.A.Bayles, P.L.Thomas, cox, T.Kirk
- 1972 Munich – Coxless Pair: M.M.K. Cooper. Coxed Four: R.W.J. Massara
- 1976 Montreal – Coxless Four: N.A.Keron, D.G.H.Townsend
- 1980 Moscow – Coxless Four: D.G.H.Townsend, M.Cross (Bronze)
- 1984 Los Angeles – Coxless Four: R.G.McBudgett, M.Cross (Gold). Women's Eight: N.V.Boyes, A.Callaway. Coxed Pair: A.M.Genziani
- 1988 Seoul – Eight: A.Obholzer, P.Beaumont, T.Dillon, S.Hassan, S.Jeffries. Coxed Four: M.Cross, J.M. Maxey, V. Thomas
- 1992 Barcelona – Coxless Four: S.Hassan. Eight: M.Cross, T.C.Foster, J.D.C.Walker, cox A.Ellison. Women's Eight: A.Patterson
- 1996 Atlanta – Coxless Four: T.C. Foster, R.Obholzer (Bronze). Eight: M.H.W. Parish, G. Smith, J.D.C. Walker. Lwt Coxless Four: M.R, Rowand Republic of South Africa
- 2000 Sydney – Single Scull: M.Wells. Coxless Four: T.C.Foster (Gold). Lwt Coxless Four: M.R, Rowand for Rep. South Africa. Women's Double: F.Houghton. Women's Eight: A.Beever
- 2004 Athens – Double Scull: M.Wells. Quad Scull: P.Wells. Eight: C.Cormack. Women's Quad Scull: F.Houghton (Silver)
- 2008 Beijing – Double Scull: M.Wells (Bronze). Women's Quad Scull: F.Houghton (Silver). Women's Eight: J.Eddie, C.Greves
- 2012 London – Quad Scull: M.Wells. Women's Quad Scull: F.Houghton, M.Wilson. Women's Eight: J.Eddie, C.Greves
- 2016 Rio de Janeiro – Men's Eight: P. Bennett (Gold). Women's Eight: J.Eddie, C.Greves, F.Houghton, M.Wilson (Silver).
- 2016 Paralympic Games, Rio de Janeiro – LTA Mixed 4+: J. Fox (Gold).
- 2021 Tokyo - Women's Quad Scull: C. Hodgkins-Byrne. Women's Eight: M. Horn, S. Parfett. Women's Lightweight Double Scull: E. Craig. Men's Coxless Four: O. Cook. Men's Eight: H. Fieldman.
- 2021 Paralympic Games- LTA Mixed 4+: J. Fox (Gold)
- 2024 Paris - Women's lightweight Double Scull: E.Craig (Gold), Women's Eight: H. Fieldman (Bronze), Women's Four: N. Long (IRL)

== Coaching team ==
- Chief coach: Antony Smith
- Senior coach: Tom Gale

== Notable members and alumni ==
- Katie Greves – World Rowing Championship 2007 & 2011 Bronze, Olympic 2008 & 2012 finalist W8+, Olympic 2016 Silver
- Frances Houghton – Four times World Champion and double Olympic silver medallist, 2004–2010 – women's quadruple scull
- Nathaniel Reilly-O'Donnell – World Champion 2015 in Men's Coxed Pair, World Champion 2014 in Men's Eight, Silver in 2011. World U23 Championships 2010 Silver M4-, World U23 Championships 2009 Bronze M8+, World Junior Championships 2006 Gold M4-
- Tim Foster – Olympic Gold Medalist in 2000
- Cameron Nichol – World Rowing Championship 2010 & 2011 Silver. (Learnt to row at University of London).
- Richard Budgett – Olympic Gold Medalist in 1984.
- Matt Wells – Olympic Bronze Medalist in 2008
- Paul Bennett – Olympic Gold Medalist in 2016, World Champion 2014 & 2015 in the Men's Eight. (Learnt to row at University of London).
- Jessica Eddie – World Rowing Championship 2007 & 2011 Bronze, Olympic 2008 & 2012 finalist W8+
- Ann Redgrave – Olympic rower and Chief Medical Officer to GB Rowing

== Member institution boat clubs ==
Some of the University of London's member institutions have their own boat clubs. Members of these clubs can try out for a place in the University of London Boat Club squad.

- King's College London Boat Club
- London School of Economics Rowing Club
- Queen Mary, University of London Boat Club
- Royal Free and University College Medical School Boat Club
- Royal Holloway University of London Boat Club
- Royal Veterinary College Boat Club
- St Bartholomew's and the Royal London Hospitals' Boat Club
- St George's Hospital Boat Club
- University College London Boat Club

The senior crews of these institutions compete annually for the Allom Cup, while the medical schools take part in the United Hospitals bumps races. Both of these contests take place on the Tideway.

== Alumni rowing ==
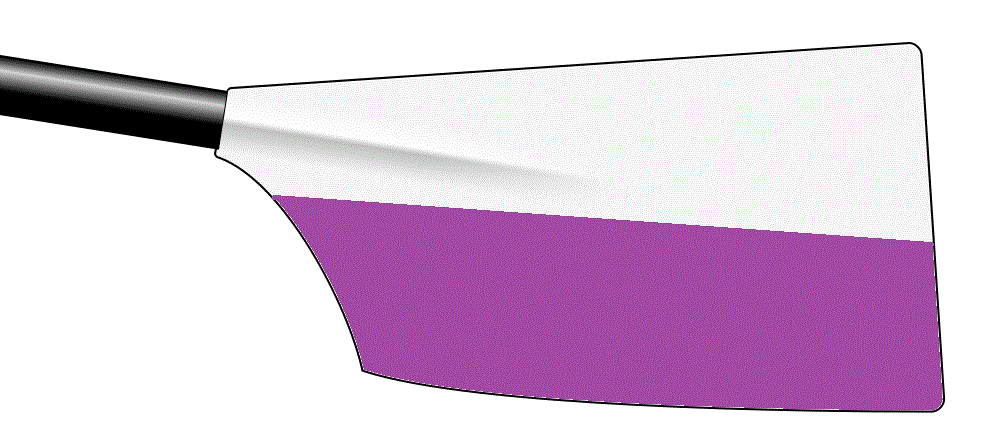
The Tyrian Club blade

The club shares its facilities with an alumni club, UL Tyrian Club. The Tyrian Club has won multiple titles at the Henley Royal Regatta, the most recent being the Wyfold Challenge Cup in 2013.

In 2015 UL Tyrian won events at Henley Masters Regattas and at the Head Of The Charles Regatta, in the USA. In 2019 a UL Tyrian won events at Henley Town & Visitors Regatta and UL Tyrian competed at the World Costal Championships in Hong Kong. The blade colours are purple and white; kit: purple.

== Honours ==
ULBC won the Victor Ludorum at the British Universities and Colleges Sport regatta for the first (and, as of 2024, only) time in 2014.

=== Henley Royal Regatta ===
Year	Races won
1961	Thames Challenge Cup
1963	Grand Challenge Cup
1968	Grand Challenge Cup
1971	Ladies' Challenge Plate, Prince Philip Challenge Cup, Visitors' Challenge Cup
1972	Visitors' Challenge Cup
1973	Stewards' Challenge Cup
1975	Ladies' Challenge Plate
1976	Visitors' Challenge Cup
1980	Thames Challenge Cup, Visitors' Challenge Cup
1981	Visitors' Challenge Cup
1982	Ladies' Challenge Plate, Prince Philip Challenge Cup (with Tyrian)
1983	Grand Challenge Cup, Thames Challenge Cup, Visitors' Challenge Cup
1984	Prince Philip Challenge Cup (Tyrian)
1985	Stewards' Challenge Cup (Tyrian)
1987	Ladies' Challenge Plate
1988	Grand Challenge Cup, Britannia Challenge Cup
1989	Stewards' Challenge Cup, Thames Challenge Cup, Prince Philip Challenge Cup
1990	Visitors' Challenge Cup
1992	Grand Challenge Cup
1993	Stewards' Challenge Cup, Double Sculls Challenge Cup (Tyrian)
1997	Britannia Challenge Cup
2002	Queen Mother Challenge Cup, Diamond Challenge Sculls
2004	Remenham Challenge Cup, Princess Grace Challenge Cup
2006	Double Sculls Challenge Cup, Princess Grace Challenge Cup
2007	Prince Albert Challenge Cup
2012	Prince Albert Challenge Cup
2013	Stewards' Challenge Cup, Wyfold Challenge Cup (Tyrian)
2014	Grand Challenge Cup
2015	Stewards' Challenge Cup
2018	Town Challenge Cup, Stonor Challenge Trophy
2021	Prince Albert Challenge Cup, Stonor Challenge Trophy
2025	Prince Albert Challenge Cup

=== British Rowing Championship ===
Year	Winning crew/s
1973	Men 4-, Men 4+
1974	Men 8+
1975	Men 2+
1976	Men 4-
1977	Men 4+, Men lightweight 4-
1978	Men 4+, Men lightweight 4-
1980	Men 8+, Whitbread Sprint
1982	Men 2+ (with Tyrian), Men 4+ (with Tyrian)
1983	Men 2+, Men 8+, Men 2- (Tyrian)
1984	Men 4- (with Tyrian), Women 4+
1985	Men 4- (with Tyrian), Men 8+
1986	Men 2+, Men 4-, Women Ltw 2x,
1987	Men Ltw 4-
1988	Women 2-
1990	Women 4+, Men 2- (with Tyrian)
1991	Men 2+, Men Ltw 4-, Men Ltw 2x (with Tyrian)
1992	Women 4x, Women 4-, Women Ltw 4-
1994	Women 4-, Women Ltw 4-
1995	Women 4-, Women 4- London University /
1996	Men 2+, Men 4x, Women 4-, Women 4+, Women 8+, Men 4x
1997	Women 2-
1998	Men Ltw 2x
2000	Women 4- (with Tyrian)
2002	Women 4- (with Tyrian)
2003	Women 4+, Women 8+
2004	Women 4x, Women U23 1x
2005	Women U23 1x
2006	Open 4+

== See also ==
- Rowing on the River Thames
- University rowing (UK)

== Notes and references ==
Notes
