= Marlena Zagoni =

Romanian rower (1951–2025)

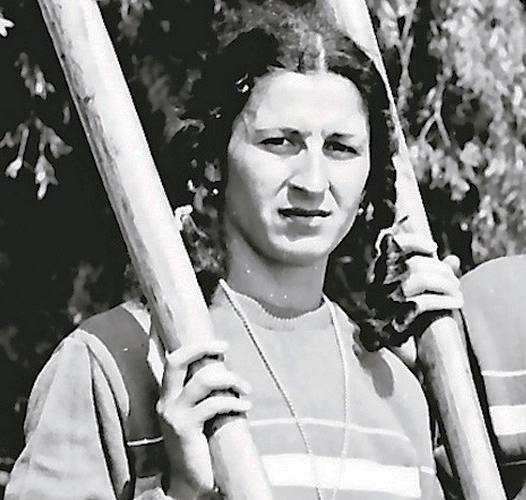
- Zagoni in the 1970s

Personal information
- Born: 22 January 1951 Lucieni, Romania
- Died: 31 July 2025 (aged 74)
- Height: 171 cm (5 ft 7 in)
- Weight: 70 kg (154 lb)

Sport
- Sport: Rowing
- Club: Dinamo Bucharest; CSA Steaua București
Medal record
Representing Romania
Olympic Games
Bronze medal – third place	1980 Moscow	Eight
World Rowing Championships
Bronze medal – third place	1974 Lucerne	Coxed four
Bronze medal – third place	1975 Nottingham	Coxless pair

Marlena Zagoni (née Predescu, 22 January 1951 – 31 July 2025) was a Romanian rower. She won a bronze medal in coxless pair at the 1975 World Championships, placing sixth at the 1976 Olympics. She won two more bronze medals: in coxed four at the 1974 World Championships and in the eight event at the 1980 Olympics. From 1998 until her death she coached rowers at CSA Steaua București. Zagoni died on 31 July 2025, at the age of 74.
