= Kevin Lee (swimmer) =

British swimmer (born 1961)

Personal information
- Born: 3 March 1961 (age 65)

Sport
- Sport: Swimming

Kevin Lee (born 3 March 1961) is a British swimmer. Lee competed in two events at the 1980 Summer Olympics. He represented England in the 100 metres butterfly, at the 1982 Commonwealth Games in Brisbane, Queensland, Australia. He won the 1983 ASA National Championship title in the 100 metres butterfly.
