= Nadezhda Prishchepa =

Ukrainian rower

Personal information
- Born: 28 June 1956 (age 70) Ukrainka, Kiev, Soviet Union
- Height: 181 cm (5 ft 11 in)
- Weight: 83 kg (183 lb)

Sport
- Sport: Rowing
- Club: Lokomotiv Kyiv
Medal record
Women's rowing
Representing the Soviet Union
Olympic Games
| Silver medal – second place | 1980 Moscow | Eight |
World Rowing Championships
| Silver medal – second place | 1977 Amsterdam | Eight |
| Gold medal – first place | 1978 Cambridge | Eight |
| Gold medal – first place | 1979 Bled | Eight |

Nadezhda Ivanovna Prishchepa (née Dergatchenko (Ukrainian: Дергаченко), later Bezpalova, Ukrainian: Надежда Ивановна Прищепа, born 28 June 1956) is a Ukrainian rower who represented the Soviet Union.
