= Nina Frolova =

Soviet rower

Personal information
- Full name: Nina Nikolayevna Frolova
- Born: 11 October 1948 (age 78)
- Height: 1.46 m (4 ft 9 in)
- Weight: 46 kg (101 lb)

Sport
- Sport: Rowing
- Club: Spartak Novgorod
Medal record
Women's rowing
Representing the Soviet Union
Olympic Games
Silver medal – second place	1980 Moscow	Eight
World Rowing Championships
Gold medal – first place	1978 Karapiro	Eight
Gold medal – first place	1979 Bled	Eight
Gold medal – first place	1981 Munich	Eight
Gold medal – first place	1982 Lucerne	Eight
Silver medal – second place	1974 Lucerne	Eight
Silver medal – second place	1977 Amsterdam	Coxed four
European Rowing Championships
Gold medal – first place	1970 Tata	Coxed four
Gold medal – first place	1971 Copenhagen	Eight
Gold medal – first place	1973 Moscow	Eight

Nina Nikolayevna Frolova (Russian: Нина Николаевна Фролова, born 11 October 1948) is a retired Soviet rowing cox. She was the first Soviet cox who was promoted to the honored master of sport.
