= Birgit Schütz =

German rower (born 1958)

Medal record

Women's rowing

Representing East Germany

Olympic Games
Gold medal – first place	1980 Moscow	Eight

World Rowing Championships
Silver medal – second place	1978 Karapiro	W8+

Birgit Schütz (born 8 October 1958 in Brandenburg an der Havel) is a German rower.
