= Nina Preobrazhenskaya =

Soviet rower (born 1956)

Personal information
- Born: Nina Ilyinichna Antoniuk; 16 February 1956 (age 70) Stavyshche, Ukraine

Sport
- Sport: Rowing
Medal record
Women's rowing
Representing the Soviet Union
Olympic Games
Silver medal – second place	1980 Moscow	Eight
World Rowing Championships
Gold medal – first place	1978 Karapiro	Eight
Gold medal – first place	1979 Bled	Eight
Silver medal – second place	1977 Amsterdam	Eight

Nina Ilyinichna Preobrazhenskaya (Russian: Нина Ильинична Преображенская, born 16 February 1956) is a Soviet rower. She first competed, under her maiden name Nina Antoniuk, at an international level at the 1977 World Rowing Championships in Amsterdam, Netherlands, where she won silver with the women's eight. At the subsequent championships in 1978 and 1979, she became world champion in that boat glass. At the 1980 Summer Olympics, she won a silver medal with the women's eight.
