= Rodica Frîntu =

Romanian rower (born 1960)

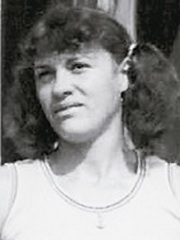

Personal information
- Born: 29 March 1960 (age 66)
- Height: 176 cm (5 ft 9 in)
- Weight: 73 kg (161 lb)

Sport
- Sport: Rowing
Medal record
Representing Romania
Olympic Games
Bronze medal – third place	1980 Moscow	Eight

Rodica Frîntu (born 29 March 1960) is a retired Romanian rower who won a bronze medal at the 1980 Olympics.
