= Krylatskoye Rowing Canal =

Rowing venue in Moscow, Russia

Coordinates: 55°45′17″N 37°26′14″E

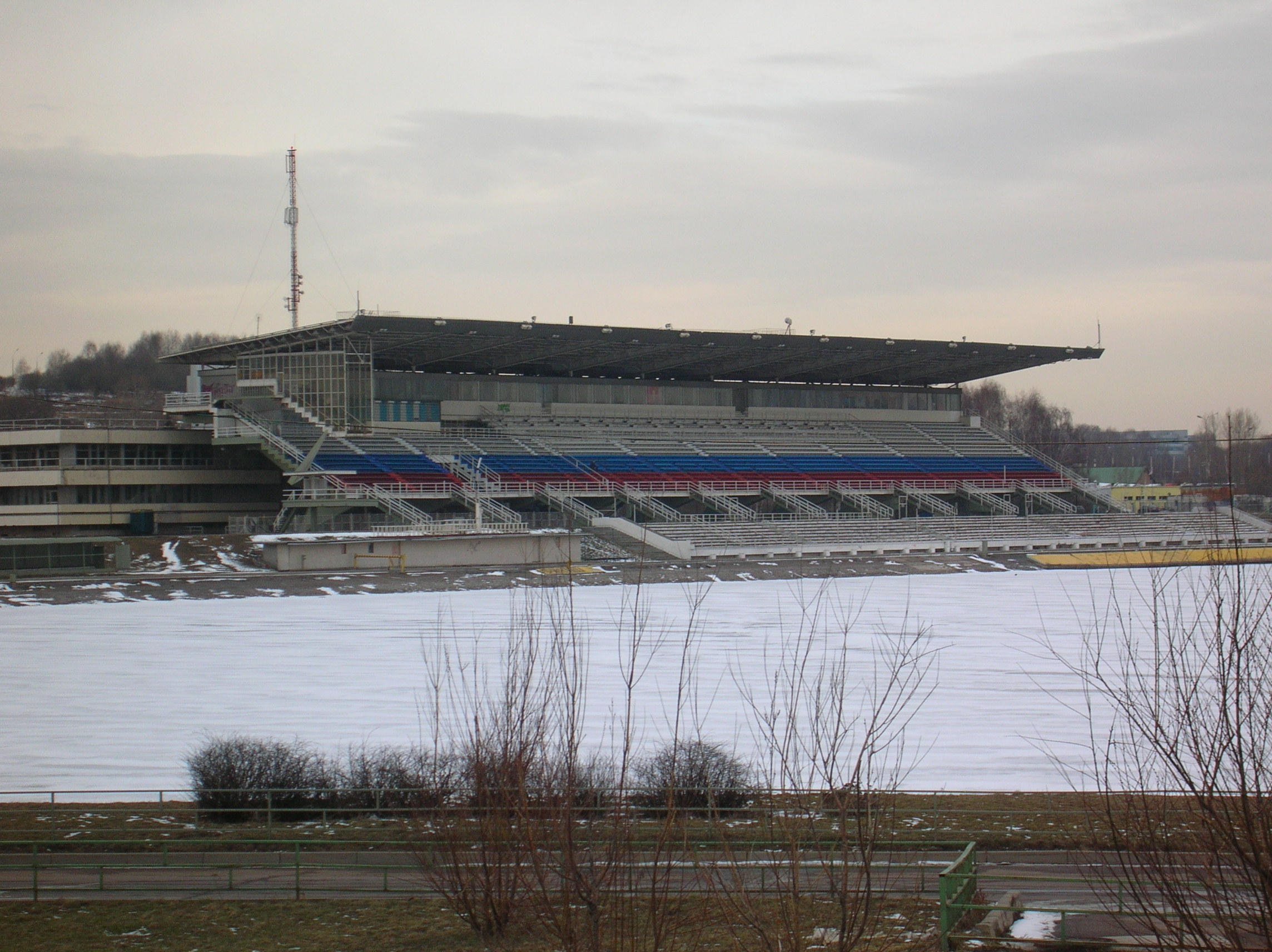
The venue in March 2008

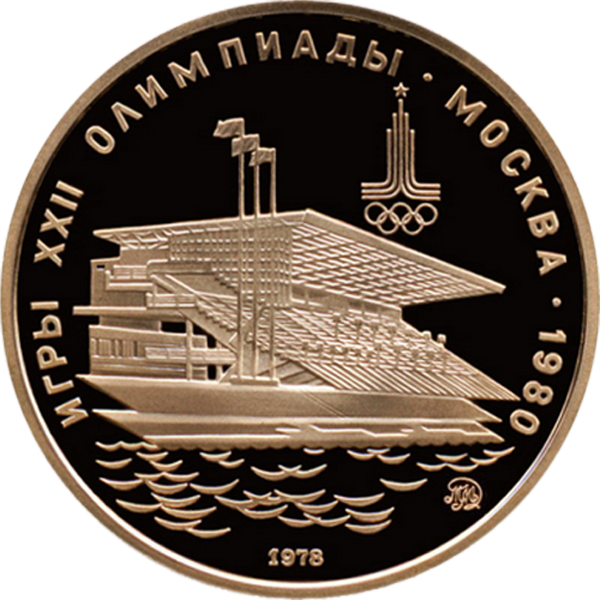
100 ruble gold coin minted in 1978 with the image of the Krylatskoye Rowing Canal to commemorate the 1980 Summer Olympics

The Krylatskoye Rowing Canal is a canoe sprint and rowing venue located in the Krylatskoye Sports Complex in Moscow, Russia.

The basin was constructed in two stages, with the first completed in 1973 for hosting the European Rowing Championships and the second in 1979 for the finals of the VII USSR Summer Spartakiade. The basin is filled with water flowing from the Karamyshevskaya weir on the Moskva River. The venue hosted rowing competitions for the 1980 Summer Olympics. The 2014 ICF Canoe Sprint World Championships were also held there.
