= Astrid Ayling =

German and British rower

Personal information
- Nationality: West German / British
- Born: Astrid Hohl; 9 December 1951 (age 74) Aachen, Germany

Sport
- Sport: Rowing
- Club: Koblenzer Rudergesellschaft; Koblenzer RC Rhenania; Kingston RC

Astrid Ayling (née Hohl; born 9 December 1951) is a retired German and British rower. She competed for Great Britain at the 1980 Summer Olympics and the 1984 Summer Olympics.

== Rowing career ==
In 1975 she finished fourth in the double sculls for West Germany at the 1975 World Rowing Championships. After marrying fellow British national rowing champion Richard Ayling in 1976 she competed for Great Britain. In 1977 she was part of the double scull that reached the final and finished fifth at the 1977 World Rowing Championships in Amsterdam. This was the first time that a British women's crew had reached a world final. She later won the 1977 National Championships single and double sculls title (with Pauline Hart) rowing for Kingston. The pair repeated the double sculls success the following year in 1978. At the 1979 National Championships she was part of the composite crew that won the quadruple sculls.

She was selected to represent Great Britain at the 1980 Olympic Games, where she was part of the women's double sculls team with Sue Handscomb. The pair finished in seventh place The following year she was part of the doubles sculls, with Sue McNuff (née Handscomb) and coxed four, that won the national titles, at the 1981 National Championships.

One year later she won the double sculls title again but this time with Rosie Clugston, rowing for a Kingston and Borough Road College composite, at the 1982 National Rowing Championships. A second Olympic Games appearance arrived in 1984 when she formed part of the women's eight that finished in fifth place.
