= Valentina Zhulina =

Soviet rower

Personal information
- Born: Valentina Aleksandrovna Yermakova; 15 June 1953 (age 73)

Sport
- Sport: Rowing
Medal record
Women's rowing
Representing the Soviet Union
Olympic Games
Silver medal – second place	1980 Moscow	Eight
World Rowing Championships
Gold medal – first place	1978 Cambridge	Eight
Gold medal – first place	1979 Bled	Eight
Silver medal – second place	1974 Lucerne	Eight

Valentina Aleksandrovna Zhulina (Russian: Валентина Александровна Жулина, née Yermakova, born 15 June 1953) is a Soviet rower. She competed under her maiden name until 1979.
