= Nicola Boyes =

British rower

Personal information
- Nationality: British
- Born: 16 December 1954 (age 70) Worthing, England

Sport
- Sport: Rowing
- Club: Clare BC; Civil Service Ladies RC

Nicola Vivien Boyes married name Nicola Burbidge (born 16 December 1954) is a retired British rower who competed at the 1980 Summer Olympics.

== Rowing career ==
Boyes took up rowing in 1974 when studying medicine at Clare College, Cambridge and rowed in the Cambridge Blue Boat in 1974 and 1975.

Boyes was part of the coxed fours crew, with Yvonne Earl, Maggie Phillips, Chris Grimes and Pauline Wright (cox), that won the national title rowing for the Civil Service Ladies Rowing Club, at the 1977 National Championships. She was consequently selected for Great Britain as part of the coxed four that finished 9th overall and fourth in the B final at the 1977 World Rowing Championships in Amsterdam.

After rowing at the 1979 World Rowing Championships in Bled. she was part of the women's eight event that was selected to go to the 1980 Olympic Games in Moscow, the crew which contained Boyes, Gill Hodges, Joanna Toch, Penny Sweet, Lin Clark, Elizabeth Paton, Rosie Clugston, Beverly Jones and Pauline Wright (cox) finished in fifth place. A third World Championship appearance ensued in 1983, when she competed in the eights at the 1983 World Rowing Championships in Wedau, Germany.
