= Olga Pivovarova =

Soviet rower (born 1956)

Personal information
- Native name: Ольга Иосифовна Пивоварова
- Full name: Olga Iosifovna Pivovarova; Olha Iosypivna Pyvovarova
- Born: 29 January 1956 (age 70) Sverdlovsk, Luhansk Oblast, Ukraine
Medal record
Women's rowing
Representing the Soviet Union
Olympic Games
Silver medal – second place	1980 Moscow	Eight
World Rowing Championships
Gold medal – first place	1979 Bled	Eight (W8+)
Gold medal – first place	1981 Munich	Coxed four (W4+)
Silver medal – second place	1977 Amsterdam	Eight (W8+)

Olga Iosifovna Pivovarova (Russian: Ольга Иосифовна Пивоварова, born 29 January 1956) is a former rower who competed for the Soviet Union.
