= Florica Bucur =

Romanian rower

Personal information
- Born: 18 May 1959 (age 67)
Medal record
Women's rowing
Representing Romania
Olympic Games
Bronze medal – third place	1980 Moskva	Eight

Florica Bucur (born 18 May 1959) is a Romanian former rower who competed in the 1980 Summer Olympics.
