= Elena Bondar =

Romanian rower (born 1958)

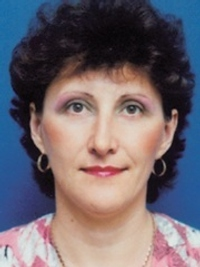

Personal information
- Born: 6 November 1958 (age 68)
- Height: 178 cm (5 ft 10 in)
- Weight: 74 kg (163 lb)

Sport
- Sport: Rowing
Medal record
Representing Romania
Olympic Games
| Bronze medal – third place | 1980 Moscow | Eight |
World Championships
| Bronze medal – third place | 1981 Munich | Eights |

Elena Bondar (born 6 November 1958) is a retired Romanian rower who competed in the eights. She won bronze medals at the 1980 Olympics and 1981 World Championships.
