= Charles Wiggin (rower) =

British rower

Personal information
- Nationality: British
- Born: 8 January 1950 (age 76)
Medal record
Men's rowing
Bronze medal – third place	1980 Moscow	Coxless pair

Anthony Charles D. Wiggin (born 8 January 1950) is a British rower who competed in the 1980 Summer Olympics.

== Rowing career ==
Wiggin was part of the quad scull that finished 7th overall after winning the B final at the 1977 World Rowing Championships in Amsterdam.

In 1978 Wiggin and his partner Malcolm Carmichael won the coxless pairs at the 1978 British Rowing Championships. Two years later the pair won the bronze medal in the coxless pairs event at the 1980 Olympics in Moscow.
