= Tatyana Stetsenko =

Soviet rower

Tatiana Stetsenko
Personal information
- Born: 7 February 1957 (age 69) Plesetske, Kyiv, Soviet Union
- Height: 187 cm (6 ft 2 in)
- Weight: 86 kg (190 lb)

Sport
- Sport: Rowing
- Club: Lokomotiv Kyiv
Medal record
Women's rowing
Representing the Soviet Union
Olympic Games
Silver medal – second place	1980 Moscow	Eight
World Rowing Championships
Silver medal – second place	1977 Amsterdam	Eight

Tatiana Ivanivna Stetsenko, later Bunyak (Ukrainian: Тетяна Іванівна Стеценко (Буняк); born 7 February 1957) is a Ukrainian-Soviet rower.

Stetsenko was born in Plesetske, Kyiv. She won a silver medal at the 1980 Moscow Olympics with the women's eight.
