= Marina Wilke =

German rowing cox (born 1958)

Personal information
- Born: 28 February 1958 (age 68) East Berlin, East Germany
- Height: 158 cm (5 ft 2 in)
- Weight: 48 kg (106 lb)
- Relatives: Harald Jährling (husband, div.); Rob Jahrling (son)

Sport
- Sport: Rowing
- Club: SC Berlin-Grünau
Medal record
Women's rowing
Representing East Germany
Olympic Games
Gold medal – first place	1976 Montreal	Eight
Gold medal – first place	1980 Moscow	Eight
World Rowing Championships
Gold medal – first place	1975 Nottingham	Eight
Gold medal – first place	1977 Amsterdam	Coxed four
Silver medal – second place	1978 Cambridge	Eight
Silver medal – second place	1979 Bled	Eight

Marina Wilke (later Jährling; born 28 February 1958) is a German rowing cox who competed for East Germany in the 1976 and 1980 Summer Olympics.

== Rowing career ==
She was born in East Berlin. She competed for SC Berlin-Grünau.

At the 1975 World Rowing Championships in Nottingham, she won a gold medal coxing the women's eight. In 1976 she was the coxswain of the East German boat that won the Olympic gold medal in the eight event. For her Olympic success, she was awarded the Patriotic Order of Merit in silver (2nd class) by the state.

At the 1977 World Rowing Championships in Amsterdam, she was the cox for the women's four that won gold. In February 1978, she was given the sports awards Honoured Master of Sports. At the 1978 World Rowing Championships in Cambridge, New Zealand, she won a silver medal with the women's eight. She won another silver medal in the same boat class at the 1979 World Rowing Championships in Bled. At the 1980 Summer Olympics, she won her second Olympic gold medal as cox of the East German boat in the eight competition. She was once more awarded the Patriotic Order of Merit in silver (2nd class) for her Olympic success.

== Private life ==
Wilke received her schooling at Conrad Blenkle Polytechnic Secondary School in the Köpenick suburb of East Berlin. Before she had her rowing career, she had a son—Rob Jahrling—with Harald Jährling in 1974 shortly before her 16th birthday. She retired from rowing after the 1980 Olympics and married her fellow Olympic rower Harald Jährling in August 1980, shortly after the Olympics. They later divorced. Their son has represented Australia in rowing at three consecutive Olympic Games.
