= Elena Dobrițoiu =

Romanian rower (born 1957)

Personal information
- Full name: Elena Radu-Dobriţoiu
- Born: 29 August 1957 (age 68) Bucharest, Romania
Medal record
Women's rowing
Representing Romania
Olympic Games
Bronze medal – third place	1980 Moscow	Eight

Elena Dobriţoiu (born 29 August 1957), also known as Elena Radu-Dobriţoiu, is a Romanian former rowing cox who competed in the 1980 Summer Olympics.
