= Maria Constantinescu (rower) =

Romanian rower

Personal information
- Born: 5 July 1956 (age 69)
Medal record
Women's rowing
Representing Romania
Olympic Games
Bronze medal – third place	1980 Moskva	Eight

Maria Constantinescu (born 5 July 1956) is a Romanian former rower who competed in the 1980 Summer Olympics.
