= Maria Paziun =

Soviet rower

Medal record

Women's rowing

Representing the Soviet Union

Olympic Games
Silver medal – second place	1980 Moscow	Eight

World Championships
Gold medal – first place	1978 Karapiro	Eight
Gold medal – first place	1979 Bled	Eight
Gold medal – first place	1981 Munich	Eight
Silver medal – second place	1977 Amsterdam	Eight

Mariya Vasilyevna Paziun (Russian: Мария Васильевна Пазюн, born 17 July 1953) is a Soviet rower.
