= Ana Iliuță =

Romanian rower

Personal information
- Born: 10 January 1958 (age 68) Romania
Medal record
Women's rowing
Representing Romania
Olympic Games
Bronze medal – third place	1980 Moscow	Eight

Ana Iliuță (born 10 January 1958) is a Romanian former rower who competed in the 1980 Summer Olympics.
