= Maggie Phillips =

British rower

Personal information
- Birth name: Margaret A. Lambourn
- Born: 11 April 1951 (age 74); Oxford, Oxfordshire

Sport
- Sport: Rowing
- Club: Abingdon; Civil Service Ladies; Kingston RC

Margaret A. Phillips (née Lambourn; born 11 April 1951) is a retired rower who competed for Great Britain.

== Rowing career ==
Lambourn was born in 1951. She started rowing when she joined the Abingdon Rowing Club while in the sixth form at school. After leaving school she joined the Civil Service Ladies Rowing Club.

After a bronze medal success in the coxed fours at the 1972 British Rowing Championships she became a British champion the following year when winning the same event at the 1973 British Rowing Championships. In 1974 she won a second British title at the 1974 British Rowing Championships and was consequently selected by Great Britain for the 1974 World Rowing Championships in Lucerne which was the inaugural championships for women. Competing in the coxed four event the crew finished 11th overall after a fifth place finish in the B final.

At the 1975 World Rowing Championships she rowed in the eight that took 10th place finishing fourth in the B final.

She married Jack Phillips in Abingdon during 1976 and rowed as Maggie Phillips afterwards. Her hopes of rowing in the 1976 Summer Olympics were ruined by the decision by the Amateur Rowing Association to take only certain boats. In 1977 she was part of the coxed four that finished 9th overall and fourth in the B final at the 1977 World Rowing Championships in Amsterdam and won a third National title in the coxed four at the 1977 British Rowing Championships.

Phillips became an umpire in 1982. She was a member of the jury at the 2010 World Rowing Championships at Lake Karapiro in New Zealand and was umpire at the 2012 Olympics held at Eton Dorney in England.
