= Malcolm Carmichael =

British rower (born 1955)

Personal information
- Nationality: British
- Born: 8 September 1955 (age 70)
Medal record
Men's rowing
Bronze medal – third place	1980 Moscow	Coxless pair

Malcolm James Carmichael (born 8 September 1955) is a British rower who competed in the 1980 Summer Olympics.

== Rowing career ==
Carmichael was part of the quad scull that finished 7th overall after winning the B final at the 1977 World Rowing Championships in Amsterdam. In 1978 Carmichael and his partner Charles Wiggin won the coxless pairs at the 1978 British Rowing Championships. Two years later the pair won the bronze medal in the coxless pairs event at the 1980 Olympics in Moscow.
