= Jackie Darling =

British rower

Personal information
- Birth name: Jacqueline Darling
- Born: 2nd quarter 1949; Hampstead, London

Sport
- Sport: Rowing
- Club: Civil Service Ladies; Barnes Bridge Ladies RC

Jackie Darling (born 1949) is a retired rower who competed for Great Britain.

== Rowing career ==
Darling first started rowing when she joined the Civil Service Ladies Rowing Club in 1969. Her debut for England came at the 1971 Home Countries international where she won the novice single sculls. She then became the club captain from 1972–1973.

She became a British champion in 1974 when winning the quadruple sculls at the 1974 British Rowing Championships and was consequently selected by Great Britain for the 1974 World Rowing Championships in Lucerne which was the inaugural championships for women. Competing in the quadruple sculls event the crew were eliminated during the heats.

She successfully defended her quads title the following year at the 1975 British Rowing Championships and also won the double sculls with Pauline Bird but missed her chance for possible 1976 Olympic selection following a serious injury after being knocked off her bicycle by a car. She was part of the eight at the 1975 World Rowing Championships in Nottingham, the crew finished 10th overall after a fourth-place finish in the B final. In 1976 she won a fourth British title after winning the doubles sculls with Christine Davies.

In 1997 she was awarded the ARA Medal of Honour in recognition of her services to rowing.

As of 2019, Darling remains involved with the same club and continues rowing in Masters events.
