= Sue Handscomb =

British rower

Personal information
- Nationality: British
- Born: 21 September 1956 (age 68); Wandsworth, England

Sport
- Sport: Rowing
- Club: Civil Service Ladies RC; Weybridge Ladies

Sue McNuff (née Handscomb; born 21 September 1956) is a retired British rower who competed at the 1980 Summer Olympics.

== Rowing career ==
Handscomb began rowing for Barn Elms while still at school in 1973. She joined the Civil Services Ladies Rowing Club and won the junior coxed fours at the 1974 National Championships. Then she was selected by Great Britain at the 1975 World Rowing Championships.

Handscomb won the quadruple sculls event, with Rosie Clugston, Jane Curry, Beverly Jones and E Morris (cox), at the 1977 National Championships. The same year she went to the 1977 World Rowing Championships in Amsterdam and then one year later went to the 1978 World Rowing Championships in Bled.

She was selected to represent Great Britain in the women's double sculls event at the 1980 Olympic Games in Montreal. With her rowing partner Astrid Ayling they finished in seventh place. She was part of the coxed four, that won the national title at the 1981 National Championships and a fourth and final World Championship appearance ensued at the 1981 World Rowing Championships in Munich.

== Personal life ==
She is married to fellow GB rower Ian McNuff.
