= Gillian Hodges =

British rower

Personal information
- Born: 13 August 1957 (age 68) Bermondsey, Greater London, England

Sport
- Sport: Rowing
- Club: Tideway Scullers School
Medal record
Rowing
Representing England
Commonwealth Games
Gold medal – first place	1986 Edinburgh	Lwt coxless four

Gillian 'Gill' Hodges (born 13 August 1957) is a British retired rower who competed at the 1980 Summer Olympics and the 1984 Summer Olympics.

== Rowing career ==
Hodges was selected to represent Great Britain at the 1980 Olympic Games, where she was part of the women's eight. The team finished in fifth place She was part of the eight, that won the national title rowing for Great Britain senior squad boat, at the 1981 National Championships and the following year she won the coxless pairs title with Lin Clark, at the 1982 National Rowing Championships and the pair repeated the success the following year at the 1983 National Rowing Championships.

A second Olympic Games appearance arrived in 1984 when she formed part of the women's eight that finished in fifth place. She was part of the quadruple sculls, that won the national title rowing for A.R.A squad, at the 1985 National Championships. One year later she represented England and won a gold medal in the lightweight coxless four, at the 1986 Commonwealth Games in Edinburgh, Scotland.
