= Penny Sweet =

British rower

Personal information
- Nationality: British
- Born: 16 October 1957 (age 67); Bath, England

Sport
- Sport: Rowing

Penny Sweet (born 16 October 1957) is a British rower. She competed in the women's eight event at the 1980 Summer Olympics.
