= Rosemary Mayglothling =

British rower

Rosemary Mayglothling OBE, OLY
Personal information
- Nationality: British
- Born: 15 February 1954 (age 72) Surrey
- Spouse: Sarah Springman

Sport
- Sport: Rowing
- Club: Weybridge Ladies RC; Civil Service Ladies; Borough Road College RC; Belvoir RC

Rosemary Frances Mayglothling OBE OLY (née Clugston; born 15 February 1954) is a retired British rower, who competed at the 1980 Summer Olympics.

== Biography ==
Aged 16, Mayglothling took up skiffing with the Wraysbury Skiff and Punting Club before joining Weybridge Ladies in 1974. As part of the Great Britain squad in 1975, she competed at the 1975 World Rowing Championships in Nottingham. Under her maiden name of Clugston, she won the quadruple sculls event at the 1977 National Championships and was consequently selected for the 1977 World Rowing Championships in Amsterdam.

At the 1978 National Championships she won the quadruple sculls and was later selected to represent Great Britain at her third World Championships in 1979 at Bled.

In 1980, she represented GBR in the Women's eight at the 1980 Olympic Games in Moscow. The team finished in fifth place. Two years later she won the double sculls title with Astrid Ayling, rowing for a Kingston and Borough Road College composite, at the 1982 National Rowing Championships. and they also won the inaugural Invitation Women’s Doubles at Henley Royal Regatta, also in 1982. She appeared in her fourth World Championships during 1982.

She has a B. Hum Joint Honours Degree in English and Movement Studies from the West London Institute of Higher Education (later Brunel University) and an MPhil from Sheffield Hallam University on the Effects of Marketing on Rowing Activity in a South Yorkshire Community, which was supervised by Professor Celia Brackenridge. She has published two books: Rowing: The Skills of the Game, and Rowing and Sculling: Skills. Training. Techniques with Tristan Mayglothling.

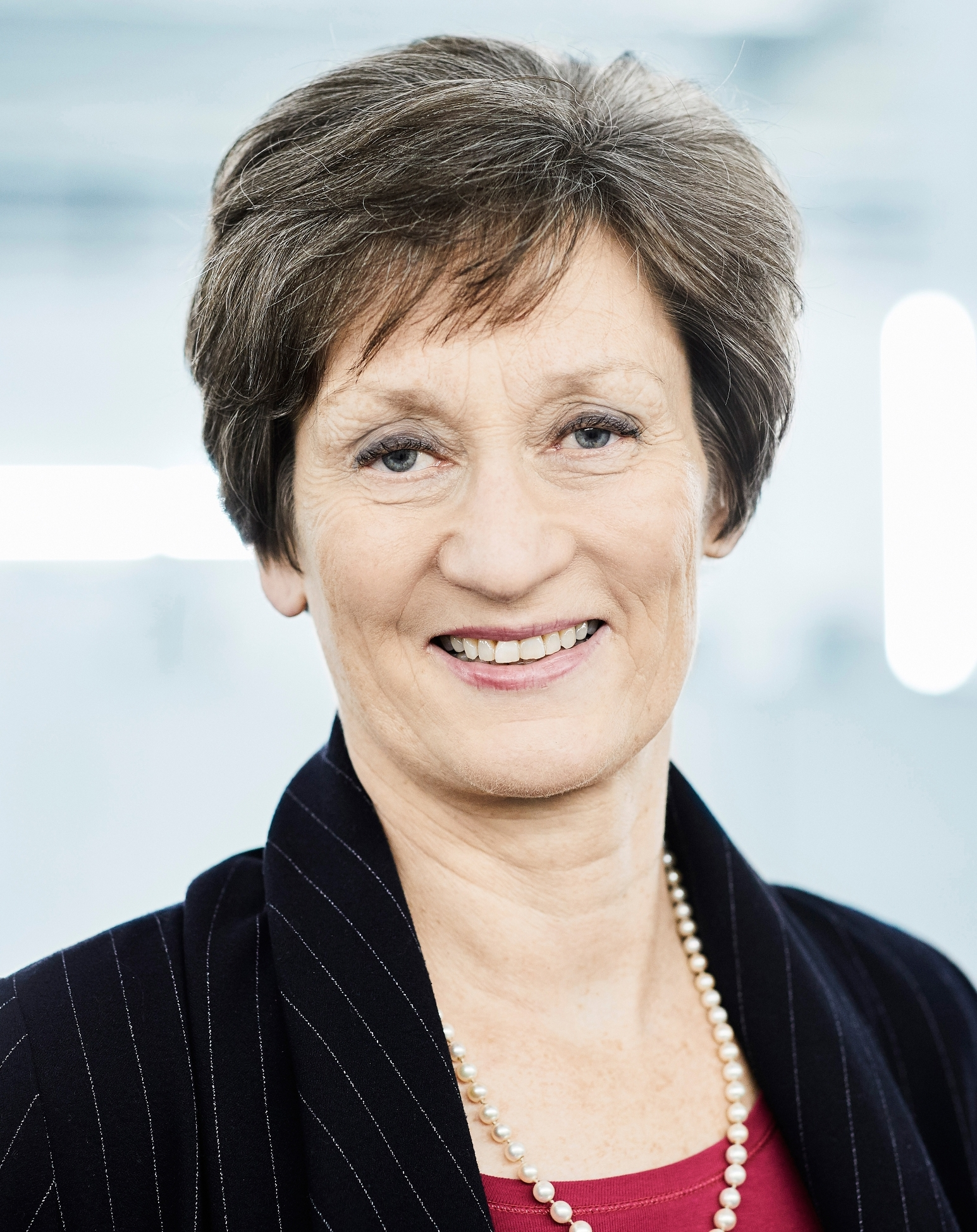
Sarah Springman, Mayglothing's wife

She was jointly responsible with Chris Aistrop for setting up the Henley Women's Regatta in June 1988. She became Co-Vice Chair of the Women's Sports Foundation in 1989 for a term.

She is married to Dame Sarah Springman.

== Coaching and administration ==
She subsequently became senior national coach for the Amateur Rowing Association, was the Technical Coordinator for British Rowing, before being promoted to become Director of Pathway Development until she retired in 2018. She serves as chairman of the Competitive Rowing Commission of World Rowing (FISA) and is a member of the Executive Committee.

== Honours ==
Awarded an Honorary Doctorate (DSc) from her alma mater, Brunel University, in 2014. Awarded British Rowing's Medal of Honour in 2017 for her tireless promotion of women in sport and rowing, and for her seminal contribution to rowing at an international level. Appointed Officer of the Order of the British Empire (OBE) in the 2020 New Year Honours for services to rowing and gender equality in sport.
