= Joanna Toch =

British rower (born 1961)

Jo Toch
Personal information
- Full name: Joanna Patricia Toch
- Nationality: British
- Born: 13 October 1961 (age 65) Surrey, England
- Education: King's College London
Medal record
Women's rowing
Representing Great Britain
World Championships
| Silver medal – second place | 1989 Bled | Lwt women's four |

Joanna Patricia Toch (/tɒtʃ/ TOTCH; born 13 October 1961) is a British double Olympian rower, a family law barrister called to the Bar in 1988, and the founder and chief executive of Family Law Cafe, an online family law service. She represented Great Britain at the 1980 and 1984 Summer Olympics and won a silver medal at the 1989 World Rowing Championships.

== Early life ==
Toch was born in Sutton, Surrey, into a sporting family. Her father, Peter Toch, was a national boxing champion, winning the ABA heavyweight title in 1950 at the age of 18 while in the Army. When she was six the family moved to Shepperton, where her parents ran the River View Hotel on the River Thames. She turned her hand to almost any sport as a child, and took up rowing at 16 at Weybridge Ladies Amateur Rowing Club.

== Sporting career ==
She began rowing in 1977.

Toch rowed for Great Britain in the 1979 World Rowing Junior Championships, 1980 Moscow Olympic Games (she was the youngest member of the Great Britain team), the 1984 Los Angeles Olympic Games, the 1986 Commonwealth Games and six World Rowing Championships between 1981 and 1990.

At the 1986 Commonwealth Games in Edinburgh, Toch, then 24, publicly challenged Margaret Thatcher on 31 July 1986. Thatcher had criticised the boycott of the Games by African and other Commonwealth nations over her government’s stance on South Africa. Toch contrasted this with the government’s encouragement of British athletes to boycott the 1980 Moscow Olympics, telling Thatcher she was guilty of “double standards”.The exchange made the front pages of several national newspapers on 1 August 1986, including The Times, The Daily Telegraph, the Daily Mirror (under the headline “The Girl Who Gave Thatcher a Rocket”), the Daily Record and The Scotsman.

She was part of the eight, that won the national title rowing for Great Britain senior squad boat, at the 1981 National Championships and was part of the eight that won the national title, rowing for an A.R.A Composite, at the 1982 National Rowing Championships.

She won both the coxed four and lightweight coxless four national titles at the 1989 National Championships and won a silver medal at the 1989 World Rowing Championships in Bled, in the lightweight coxless four event. She was in the first women's crew to row at Henley Royal Regatta.

After finishing her own competitive rowing, Toch became a Junior Rowing coach. Toch now rows for Ardingly Rowing Club. In 2015, she won a number of domestic Masters events and competed in the 2015 World Masters Rowing Championships. In 2016, she was in the Ardingly crew that won the Women's Eights Head of the River small clubs pennant, she won the pairs event at Master's Henley and won in the women's Masters eight at the Masters World Championships in Copenhagen.

== Legal career ==
Toch graduated in law from King’s College London in 1985, having taken a year out of her degree to compete at the 1984 Olympics. During a sabbatical year she was editor of London Student, the University of London’s student newspaper. She was called to the Bar in 1988 and completed a criminal pupillage at 3 Temple Gardens, the chambers of Ann Goddard QC, then became a lecturer at the Inns of Court School of Law.

She returned to practice in 1992 doing civil and criminal work, and in 1996 joined Dr Johnson’s Buildings, where she focused on family law. In 2002 she joined the solicitors’ firm Haider Kennedy, where she learnt how to establish and run a practice. In 2007 she moved to Brachers in Maidstone, the largest firm in Kent, specialising in divorce, financial remedies, cohabitation disputes and children cases. She also trained as a mediator, giving her experience as a barrister, within solicitors’ practice and in mediation. In October 2009, she resumed practice at the Bar continuing to specialise in all aspects of family work, and in 2015 she moved to Church Court Chambers, to join the family team. Since 2019 she has practised from her own chambers, Family Law Chambers London.

=== Recent reported decisions ===
Toch has appeared in several reported cases, including Hubbard and Martin v Scott [2011] EWHC 2750 (Ch), S (A Child) [2012] EWCA Civ 1031, and Chiva v Chiva [2014] EWCA Civ 1558, in which she represented the appellant wife under public access. In Re G (A Child) [2015] EWCA Civ 834, she represented the mother in a successful appeal in which the Court of Appeal set aside the findings of fact after concluding that the judge's interventions had compromised the fairness of the hearing.

=== Family Law Cafe ===
Toch founded Family Law Cafe, an online service providing access to family law advice and assistance through a subscription model. She established the service in response to the difficulties faced by people navigating family proceedings, particularly following the reduction in the availability of legal aid.

Toch also hosts the Family Law Cafe Podcast, launched in 2023, which features discussions with lawyers and other professionals involved in family disputes. She also produces a weekly newsletter and delivers webinars on family law developments.

== Racism controversy ==
In June 2021 Toch replied to a tweet by the journalist Julie Burchill about the name of Lilibet Mountbatten-Windsor with the comment “No Doria? Don’t black names matter?”. The comment was criticised by some on Twitter as racist. Toch deleted the tweets and apologised.

Family Law Cafe conducted an internal review. The review found no evidence of any discriminatory practice, and she returned as chief executive in July 2021. In March 2022 the Bar Standards Board’s independent panel found that her posts did not diminish public confidence in the profession or undermine her integrity or independence. Toch said her 33-year career as a barrister remained unblemished.
