= Elizabeth Paton (rower) =

British rower

Personal information
- Nationality: British
- Born: 8 November 1952 (age 72)

Sport
- Sport: Rowing

Elizabeth McVeigh (née Paton) (born 8 November 1952) is a British rower. She competed in the women's eight event at the 1980 Summer Olympics.
