= List of 1976 Summer Olympics medal winners =

The following is a list of medalists at the 1976 Summer Olympics, held in the city of Montreal, Quebec, Canada from July 17 to August 1.

== Aquatics ==
=== Diving ===
==== Men ====
Event	Gold	Silver	Bronze
3 m springboard	Phil Boggs; United States	Giorgio Cagnotto; Italy	Aleksandr Kosenkov; Soviet Union
10 m platform	Klaus Dibiasi; Italy	Greg Louganis; United States	Vladimir Aleynik; Soviet Union

==== Women ====
Event	Gold	Silver	Bronze
3 m springboard	Jennifer Chandler; United States	Christa Köhler; East Germany	Cynthia Potter; United States
10 m platform	Elena Vaytsekhovskaya; Soviet Union	Ulrika Knape; Sweden	Deborah Wilson; United States

=== Swimming ===
==== Men's events ====
Event	Gold		Silver		Bronze	
100 m freestyle	Jim Montgomery; United States	49.99 (WR)	Jack Babashoff; United States	50.81	Peter Nocke; West Germany	51.31
200 m freestyle	Bruce Furniss; United States	1:50.29 (WR)	John Naber; United States	1:50.50	Jim Montgomery; United States	1:50.58
400 m freestyle	Brian Goodell; United States	3:51.93 (WR)	Tim Shaw; United States	3:52.54	Vladimir Raskatov; Soviet Union	3:55.76
1500 m freestyle	Brian Goodell; United States	15:02.40 (WR)	Bobby Hackett; United States	15:03.91	Stephen Holland; Australia	15:04.66
100 m backstroke	John Naber; United States	55.49 (WR)	Peter Rocca; United States	56.34	Roland Matthes; East Germany	57.22
200 m backstroke	John Naber; United States	1:59.19 (WR)	Peter Rocca; United States	2:00.55	Dan Harrigan; United States	2:01.35
100 m breaststroke	John Hencken; United States	1:03.11 (WR)	David Wilkie; Great Britain	1:03.43	Arvydas Juozaitis; Soviet Union	1:04.23
200 m breaststroke	David Wilkie; Great Britain	2:15.11 (WR)	John Hencken; United States	2:17.26	Rick Colella; United States	2:19.20
100 m butterfly	Matt Vogel; United States	54.35	Joe Bottom; United States	54.50	Gary Hall, Sr. United States	54.65
200 m butterfly	Mike Bruner; United States	1:59.23 (WR)	Steve Gregg; United States	1:59.54	Bill Forrester; United States	1:59.96
400 m individual medley	Rod Strachan; United States	4:23.68 (WR)	Tim McKee; United States	4:24.62	Andrey Smirnov; Soviet Union	4:26.90
4 × 200 m freestyle relay	United States; John Naber; Mike Bruner; Bruce Furniss; Jim Montgomery	7:23.22 (WR)	Soviet Union; Vladimir Raskatov; Andrei Bogdanov; Sergey Kopliakov; Andrey Krylov	7:27.97	Great Britain; Alan McClatchey; Brian Brinkley; Gordon Downie; David Dunne	7:32.11
4 × 100 m medley relay	United States; John Naber; John Hencken; Matt Vogel; Jim Montgomery	3:42.22 (WR)	Canada; Stephen Pickell; Graham Smith; Clay Evans; Gary MacDonald	3:45.94	West Germany; Klaus Steinbach; Michael Kraus; Walter Kusch; Peter Nocke	3:47.29

==== Women's events ====
Event	Gold		Silver		Bronze	
100 m freestyle	Kornelia Ender; East Germany	55.65 (WR)	Petra Priemer; East Germany	56.49	Enith Brigitha; Netherlands	56.65
200 m freestyle	Kornelia Ender; East Germany	1:59.26 (WR)	Shirley Babashoff; United States	2:01.22	Enith Brigitha; Netherlands	2:01.40
400 m freestyle	Petra Thümer; East Germany	4:09.89 (WR)	Shirley Babashoff; United States	4:10.46	Shannon Smith; Canada	4:14.60
800 m freestyle	Petra Thümer; East Germany	8:37.14 (WR)	Shirley Babashoff; United States	8:37.59	Wendy Weinberg; United States	8:42.60
100 m backstroke	Ulrike Richter; East Germany	1:01.83 (OR)	Birgit Treiber; East Germany	1:03.41	Nancy Garapick; Canada	1:03.71
200 m backstroke	Ulrike Richter; East Germany	2:13.43 (OR)	Birgit Treiber; East Germany	2:14.97	Nancy Garapick; Canada	2:15.60
100 m breaststroke	Hannelore Anke; East Germany	1:11.16	Lyubov Rusanova; Soviet Union	1:13.04	Marina Koshevaya; Soviet Union	1:13.30
200 m breaststroke	Marina Koshevaya; Soviet Union	2:33.35 (WR)	Marina Yurchenya; Soviet Union	2:36.08	Lyubov Rusanova; Soviet Union	2:36.22
100 m butterfly	Kornelia Ender; East Germany	1:00.13 (=WR)	Andrea Pollack; East Germany	1:00.98	Wendy Boglioli; United States	1:01.17
200 m butterfly	Andrea Pollack; East Germany	2:11.41 (OR)	Ulrike Tauber; East Germany	2:12.50	Rosemarie Gabriel; East Germany	2:12.86
400 m individual medley	Ulrike Tauber; East Germany	4:42.77 (WR)	Cheryl Gibson; Canada	4:48.10	Becky Smith; Canada	4:50.48
4 × 100 m freestyle relay	United States; Kim Peyton; Jill Sterkel; Shirley Babashoff; Wendy Boglioli	3:44.82 (WR)	East Germany; Petra Priemer; Kornelia Ender; Claudia Hempel; Andrea Pollack	3:45.50	Canada; Becky Smith; Gail Amundrud; Barbara Clark; Anne Jardin	3:48.81
4 × 100 m medley relay	East Germany; Ulrike Richter; Hannelore Anke; Kornelia Ender; Andrea Pollack	4:07.95 (WR)	United States; Camille Wright; Shirley Babashoff; Linda Jezek; Lauri Siering	4:14.55	Canada; Susan Sloan; Robin Corsiglia; Wendy Hogg; Anne Jardin	4:15.22

=== Water polo ===
Gold	Silver	Bronze
Hungary Gábor Csapó; Tibor Cservenyák; Tamás Faragó; György Gerendás; György Horkai; György Kenéz; Ferenc Konrád; Endre Molnár; László Sárosi; Attila Sudár; István Szívós, Jr.	Italy Umberto Panerai; Roldano Simeoni; Riccardo De Magistris; Alessandro Ghibellini; Sante Marsili; Vincenzo D'Angelo; Marcello Del Duca; Gianni De Magistris; Alberto Alberani; Silvio Baracchini; Luigi Castagnola	Netherlands Alex Boegschoten; Ton Buunk; Piet de Zwarte; Andy Hoepelman; Evert Kroon; Nico Landeweerd; Hans Smits; Gijze Stroboer; Rik Toonen; Hans van Zeeland; Jan Evert Veer

== Archery ==
Event	Gold	Silver	Bronze
Men's	Darrell Pace; United States	Hiroshi Michinaga; Japan	Giancarlo Ferrari; Italy
Women's	Luann Ryon; United States	Valentina Kovpan; Soviet Union	Zebiniso Rustamova; Soviet Union

== Athletics ==
=== Men ===
Event	Gold		Silver		Bronze	
100 metres	Hasely Crawford; Trinidad and Tobago	10.06	Don Quarrie; Jamaica	10.08	Valeriy Borzov; Soviet Union	10.14
200 metres	Don Quarrie; Jamaica	20.23	Millard Hampton; United States	20.29	Dwayne Evans; United States	20.43
400 metres	Alberto Juantorena; Cuba	44.26	Fred Newhouse; United States	44.40	Herman Frazier; United States	44.95
800 metres	Alberto Juantorena; Cuba	1:43.50; WR	Ivo van Damme; Belgium	1:43.86	Rick Wohlhuter; United States	1:44.12
1500 metres	John Walker; New Zealand	3:39.17	Ivo van Damme; Belgium	3:39.27	Paul-Heinz Wellmann; West Germany	3:39.33
5000 metres	Lasse Virén; Finland	13:24.76	Dick Quax; New Zealand	13:25.16	Klaus-Peter Hildenbrand; West Germany	13:25.38
10,000 metres	Lasse Virén; Finland	27:40.38	Carlos Lopes; Portugal	27:45:17	Brendan Foster; Great Britain	27:54.92
110 metres hurdles	Guy Drut; France	13.30	Alejandro Casañas; Cuba	13.33	Willie Davenport; United States	13.38
400 metres hurdles	Edwin Moses; United States	47.63; WR	Michael Shine; United States	48.69	Yevgeniy Gavrilenko; Soviet Union	49.45
3000 metres steeplechase	Anders Gärderud; Sweden	8:08.02; WR	Bronisław Malinowski; Poland	8:09.11	Frank Baumgartl; East Germany	8:10.36
4×100 metres relay	United States; Harvey Glance; Johnny Jones; Millard Hampton; Steve Riddick	38.33	East Germany; Manfred Kokot; Jörg Pfeifer; Klaus-Dieter Kurrat; Alexander Thieme	38.66	Soviet Union; Aleksandr Aksinin; Nikolay Kolesnikov; Juris Silovs; Valeriy Borzov	38.78
4×400 metres relay	United States; Herman Frazier; Benny Brown; Fred Newhouse; Maxie Parks	2:58.65	Poland; Ryszard Podlas; Jan Werner; Zbigniew Jaremski; Jerzy Pietrzyk	3:01.43	West Germany; Franz-Peter Hofmeister; Lothar Krieg; Harald Schmid; Bernd Herrmann	3:01.98
Marathon	Waldemar Cierpinski; East Germany	2:09:55.0	Frank Shorter; United States	2:10:45.8	Karel Lismont; Belgium	2:11:12.6
20 kilometres walk	Daniel Bautista; Mexico	1:24:40.6	Hans-Georg Reimann; East Germany	1:25:13.6	Peter Frenkel; East Germany	1:25:29.4
Long jump	Arnie Robinson; United States	8.35 m	Randy Williams; United States	8.11 m	Frank Wartenberg; East Germany	8.02 m
Triple jump	Viktor Saneyev; Soviet Union	17.29 m	James Butts; United States	17.18 m	João Carlos de Oliveira; Brazil	16.90 m
High jump	Jacek Wszoła; Poland	2.25 m	Greg Joy; Canada	2.23 m	Dwight Stones; United States	2.21 m
Pole vault	Tadeusz Ślusarski; Poland	5.50 m	Antti Kalliomäki; Finland	5.50 m	David Roberts; United States	5.50 m
Shot put	Udo Beyer; East Germany	21.05 m	Yevgeny Mironov; Soviet Union	21.03 m	Aleksandr Baryshnikov; Soviet Union	21.00 m
Discus throw	Mac Wilkins; United States	67.50 m	Wolfgang Schmidt; East Germany	66.22 m	John Powell; United States	65.70 m
Javelin throw	Miklós Németh; Hungary	94.58; WR	Hannu Siitonen; Finland	87.92	Gheorghe Megelea; Romania	87.16 m
Hammer throw	Yuriy Sedykh; Soviet Union	77.52 m	Aleksei Spiridonov; Soviet Union	76.08 m	Anatoliy Bondarchuk; Soviet Union	75.48 m
Decathlon	Bruce Jenner; United States	8618; WR	Guido Kratschmer; West Germany	8411	Mykola Avilov; Soviet Union	8369

=== Women ===
Event	Gold		Silver		Bronze	
100 metres	Annegret Richter; West Germany	11.08	Renate Stecher; East Germany	11.13	Inge Helten; West Germany	11.17
200 metres	Bärbel Eckert; East Germany	22.37; OR	Annegret Richter; West Germany	22.39	Renate Stecher; East Germany	22.47
400 metres	Irena Szewińska; Poland	49.28; WR	Christina Brehmer; East Germany	50.51	Ellen Streidt; East Germany	50.55
800 metres	Tatyana Kazankina; Soviet Union	1:54.94; WR	Nikolina Shtereva; Bulgaria	1:55.42	Elfi Zinn; East Germany	1:55.60
1500 metres	Tatyana Kazankina; Soviet Union	4:05.48	Gunhild Hoffmeister; East Germany	4:06.02	Ulrike Klapezynski; East Germany	4:06.09
100 metres hurdles	Johanna Schaller; East Germany	12.77	Tatiana Anisimova; Soviet Union	12.78	Natalya Lebedeva; Soviet Union	12.80
4×100 metres relay	East Germany; Marlies Oelsner; Renate Stecher; Carla Bodendorf; Bärbel Eckert	42.55; OR	West Germany; Elvira Possekel; Inge Helten; Annegret Richter; Annegret Kroniger	42.59	Soviet Union; Tetyana Prorochenko; Lyudmila Maslakova; Nadezhda Besfamilnaya; Vera Anisimova	43.09
4×400 metres relay	East Germany; Doris Maletzki; Brigitte Rohde; Ellen Streidt; Christina Brehmer	3:19.23 WR	United States; Debra Sapenter; Sheila Ingram; Pamela Jiles; Rosalyn Bryant	3:22.81	Soviet Union; Inta Kļimoviča; Lyudmila Aksyonova; Natalya Sokolova; Nadezhda Ilyina	3:24.24
Long jump	Angela Voigt; East Germany	6.72 m	Kathy McMillan; United States	6.66 m	Lidiya Alfeyeva; Soviet Union	6.60 m
High jump	Rosemarie Ackermann; East Germany	1.93 m OR	Sara Simeoni; Italy	1.91 m	Yordanka Blagoeva; Bulgaria	1.91 m
Shot put	Ivanka Khristova; Bulgaria	21.16 m	Nadezhda Chizhova; Soviet Union	20.96 m	Helena Fibingerová; Czechoslovakia	20.67 m
Discus throw	Evelin Schlaak; East Germany	69.00 m	Mariya Vergova; Bulgaria	67.30 m	Gabriele Hinzmann; East Germany	66.84 m
Javelin throw	Ruth Fuchs; East Germany	65.94 m	Marion Becker; West Germany	64.70 m	Kate Schmidt; United States	63.96 m
Pentathlon	Siegrun Siegl; East Germany	4745	Christine Laser; East Germany	4745	Burglinde Pollak; East Germany	4740

== Basketball ==
Event	Gold	Silver	Bronze
Men's	United States; Phil Ford; Steve Sheppard; Adrian Dantley; Walter Davis; Quinn Buckner; Ernie Grunfeld; Kenneth Carr; Scott May; Tate Armstrong; Tom LaGarde; Philip Hubbard; Mitch Kupchak	Yugoslavia; Blagoja Georgievski; Dragan Kićanović; Vinko Jelovac; Rajko Žižić; Željko Jerkov; Andro Knego; Zoran Slavnić; Krešimir Ćosić; Damir Šolman; Žarko Varajić; Dražen Dalipagić; Mirza Delibašić	Soviet Union; Vladimir Arzamaskov; Aleksandr Salnikov; Valery Miloserdov; Alzhan Zharmukhamedov; Andrei Makeev; Ivan Edeshko; Sergei Belov; Vladimir Tkachenko; Anatoly Myshkin; Mikheil Korkia; Aleksandr Belov; Vladimir Zhigily
Women's	Soviet Union; Olga Barysheva; Tamāra Dauniene; Natalya Klimova; Tatyana Ovechkina; Angelė Rupšienė; Nadezhda Shuvayeva; Nadezhda Zakharova; Uljana Semjonova; Raisa Kurvyakova; Nelli Feryabnikova; Olga Sukharnova; Tetiana Zakharova	United States; Cindy Brogdon; Susan Rojcewicz; Ann Meyers; Lusia Harris; Nancy Dunkle; Charlotte Lewis; Nancy Lieberman; Gail Marquis; Patricia Roberts; Mary Anne O'Connor; Patricia Head; Juliene Simpson	Bulgaria; Krasimira Bogdanova; Diana Dilova; Krasimira Gyurova; Penka Metodieva; Snezhana Mikhaylova; Girgina Skerlatova; Mariya Stoyanova; Margarita Shtarkelova; Petkana Makaveeva; Nadka Golcheva; Penka Stoyanova; Todorka Yordanova

== Boxing ==
Event	Gold	Silver	Bronze
Light flyweight	Jorge Hernández; Cuba	Ri Byong-uk; North Korea	Orlando Maldonado; Puerto Rico; Payao Pooltarat; Thailand
Flyweight	Leo Randolph; United States	Ramón Duvalón; Cuba	Leszek Blazynski; Poland; David Torosyan; Soviet Union
Bantamweight	Gu Yong-Ju; North Korea	Charles Mooney; United States	Patrick Cowdell; Great Britain; Viktor Rybakov; Soviet Union
Featherweight	Ángel Herrera; Cuba	Richard Nowakowski; East Germany	Leszek Kosedowski; Poland; Juan Paredes; Mexico
Lightweight	Howard Davis; United States	Simion Cuţov; Romania	Ace Rusevski; Yugoslavia; Vassily Solomin; Soviet Union
Light welterweight	Ray Leonard; United States	Andrés Aldama; Cuba	Vladimir Kolev; Bulgaria; Kazimierz Szczerba; Poland
Welterweight	Jochen Bachfeld; East Germany	Pedro Gamarro; Venezuela	Reinhard Skricek; West Germany; Victor Zilberman; Romania
Light middleweight	Jerzy Rybicki; Poland	Tadija Kačar; Yugoslavia	Rolando Garbey; Cuba; Viktor Savchenko; Soviet Union
Middleweight	Michael Spinks; United States	Rufat Riskiyev; Soviet Union	Luis Martínez; Cuba; Alec Năstac; Romania
Light heavyweight	Leon Spinks; United States	Sixto Soria; Cuba	Kostica Dafinoiu; Romania; Janusz Gortat; Poland
Heavyweight	Teófilo Stevenson; Cuba	Mircea Şimon; Romania	Clarence Hill; Bermuda; John Tate; United States

== Canoeing ==
=== Men's events ===
Event	Gold	Silver	Bronze
C-1 500 m	Aleksandr Rogov (URS)	John Wood (CAN)	Matija Ljubek (YUG)
C-1 1000 m	Matija Ljubek (YUG)	Vasyl Yurchenko (URS)	Tamás Wichmann (HUN)
C-2 500 m	Serhei Petrenko and Aleksandr Vinogradov (URS)	Jerzy Opara and Andrzej Gronowicz (POL)	Tamás Buday and Oszkár Frey (HUN)
C-2 1000 m	Serhei Petrenko and Aleksandr Vinogradov (URS)	Gheorge Danielov and Gheorghe Simionov (ROU)	Tamás Buday and Oszkár Frey (HUN)
K-1 500 m	Vasile Dîba (ROU)	Zoltán Sztanity (HUN)	Rüdiger Helm (GDR)
K-1 1000 m	Rüdiger Helm (GDR)	Géza Csapó (HUN)	Vasile Dîba (ROU)
K-2 500 m	Joachim Mattern and Bernd Olbricht (GDR)	Serhei Nahorny and Vladimir Romanovsky (URS)	Larion Serghei and Policarp Malîhin (ROU)
K-2 1000 m	Serhei Nahorny and Vladimir Romanovsky (URS)	Joachim Mattern and Bernd Olbricht (GDR)	Zoltán Bakó and István Szabó (HUN)
K-4 1000 m	Soviet Union; Sergei Chukhray; Aleksandr Degtyarev; Yuri Filatov; Vladimir Morozov	Spain; José María Esteban; José Ramón López; Herminio Menéndez; Luis Gregorio Ramos	East Germany; Frank-Peter Bischof; Bernd Duvigneau; Rüdiger Helm; Jürgen Lehnert

=== Women's events ===
Event	Gold	Silver	Bronze
K-1 500 m	Carola Zirzow (GDR)	Tatiana Korshunova (URS)	Klára Rajnai (HUN)
K-2 500 m	Nina Gopova and Galina Kreft (URS)	Anna Pfeffer and Klára Rajnai (HUN)	Bärbel Köster and Carola Zirzow (GDR)

== Cycling ==
Event	Gold	Silver	Bronze
Individual road race	Bernt Johansson; Sweden	Giuseppe Martinelli; Italy	Mieczysław Nowicki; Poland
Team time trial	Soviet Union; Aavo Pikkuus; Valery Chaplygin; Anatoly Chukanov; Vladimir Kaminsky	Poland; Ryszard Szurkowski; Tadeusz Mytnik; Mieczysław Nowicki; Stanisław Szozda	Denmark; Jørn Lund; Verner Blaudzun; Gert Frank; Jørgen Hansen
Individual pursuit	Gregor Braun; West Germany	Herman Ponsteen; Netherlands	Thomas Huschke; East Germany
Team pursuit	West Germany; Peter Vonhof; Gregor Braun; Hans Lutz; Günther Schumacher	Soviet Union; Viktor Sokolov; Vladimir Osokin; Aleksandr Perov; Vitaly Petrakov	Great Britain; Ian Hallam; Ian Banbury; Michael Bennett; Robin Croker
Sprint	Anton Tkáč; Czechoslovakia	Daniel Morelon; France	Jürgen Geschke; East Germany
1000m time trial	Klaus-Jürgen Grünke; East Germany	Michel Vaarten; Belgium	Niels Fredborg; Denmark

== Equestrian ==
Event	Gold	Silver	Bronze
Individual dressage	Christine Stückelberger and Granat; Switzerland	Harry Boldt and Woycek; West Germany	Reiner Klimke and Mehmed; West Germany
Team dressage	West Germany; Harry Boldt and Woycek; Reiner Klimke and Mehmed; Gabriela Grillo and Ultimo	Switzerland; Christine Stückelberger and Granat; Ulrich Lehmann and Widin; Doris Ramseier and Roch	United States; Hilda Gurney and Keen; Dorothy Morkis and Monaco; Edith Master and Dahlwitz
Individual eventing	Edmund Coffin and Bally-Cor; United States	Michael Plumb and Better & Better; United States	Karl Schultz and Madrigal; West Germany
Team eventing	United States; Edmund Coffin and Bally-Cor; Michael Plumb and Better & Better; Bruce Davidson and Irish-Cap; Mary Anne Tauskey and Marcus Aurelius	West Germany; Karl Schultz and Madrigal; Herbert Blöcker and Albrant; Helmut Rethemeier and Pauline; Otto Ammermann and Volturno	Australia; Wayne Roycroft and Laurenson; Mervyn Bennet and Regal Reign; Bill Roycroft and Version; Denis Pigott and Hillstead
Individual jumping	Alwin Schockemöhle and Warwick Rex; West Germany	Michel Vaillancourt and Branch Country; Canada	François Mathy and Gai Luron; Belgium
Team jumping	France; Hubert Parot and Rivage; Jean-Marcel Rozier and Bayard de Maupas; Marc Roguet and Belle de Mars; Michel Roche and Un Espoir	West Germany; Alwin Schockemöhle and Warwick Rex; Hans Günter Winkler and Torphy; Sönke Sönksen and Kwepe; Paul Schockemöhle and Agent	Belgium; Eric Wauters and Gute Sitte; François Mathy and Gai Luron; Edgar-Henri Cuepper and Le Champion; Stanny Van Paesschen and Porsche

== Fencing ==
=== Men's events ===
Event	Gold	Silver	Bronze
Individual épée	Alexander Pusch; West Germany	Hans-Jürgen Hehn; West Germany	Gyözö Kulcsar; Hungary
Team épée	Sweden; Carl von Essen; Hans Jacobson; Rolf Edling; Leif Högström; Göran Flodström	West Germany; Alexander Pusch; Hans-Jürgen Hehn; Reinhold Behr; Volker Fischer; Hanns Jana	Switzerland; François Suchanecki; Michel Poffet; Daniel Giger; Christian Kauter; Jean-Blaise Evequoz
Individual foil	Fabio dal Zotto; Italy	Aleksander Romankov; Soviet Union	Bernard Talvard; France
Team foil	West Germany; Matthias Behr; Thomas Bach; Harald Hein; Klaus Reichert; Erik Sens-Gorius	Italy; Fabio dal Zotto; Carlo Montano; Stefano Simoncelli; Giovanni Battista Coletti; Attilio Calatroni	France; Christian Noël; Bernard Talvard; Didier Flament; Frederic Pietruszka; Daniel Revenu
Individual sabre	Viktor Krovopuskov; Soviet Union	Vladimir Nazlymov; Soviet Union	Viktor Sidyak; Soviet Union
Team sabre	Soviet Union; Viktor Krovopuskov; Eduard Vinokurov; Viktor Sidyak; Vladimir Nazlymov; Mikhail Burtsev	Italy; Mario Aldo Montano; Michele Maffei; Angelo Arcidiacono; Tommaso Montano; Mario Tullio Montano	Romania; Daniel Irimiciuc; Ioan Pop; Marin Mustata; Corneliu Marin; Alexandru Nilca

=== Women's events ===
Event	Gold	Silver	Bronze
Individual foil	Ildikó Schwarczenberger; Hungary	Maria Consolata Collino; Italy	Elena Novikova-Belova; Soviet Union
Team foil	Soviet Union; Elena Novikova-Belova; Olga Knyazeva; Valentina Sidorova; Nailia Gilizova; Valentina Nikonova	France; Brigitte Latrille-Gaudin; Brigitte Gapais-Dumont; Christine Muzio; Veronique Trinquet; Claudette Herbster-Josland	Hungary; Ildikó Schwarczenberger; Edit Kovács; Magda Maros; Ildikó Újlaky-Rejtő; Ildiko Bobis

== Field hockey ==
Event	Gold	Silver	Bronze
Men's	New Zealand; Paul Ackerley; Jeff Archibald; Arthur Borren; Alan Chesney; John Christensen; Greg Dayman; Tony Ineson; Barry Maister; Selwyn Maister; Trevor Manning; Alan McIntyre; Neil McLeod; Arthur Parkin; Mohan Patel; Ramesh Patel; Les Wilson	Australia; David Bell; Greg Browning; Ric Charlesworth; Ian Cooke; Barry Dancer; Douglas Golder; Robert Haigh; Wayne Hammond; Jim Irvine; Malcolm Poole; Robert Proctor; Graeme Reid; Ronald Riley; Trevor Smith; Terry Walsh	Pakistan; Rashid Abdul; Akhtar Rasool; Mahmood Arshad; Arshad Chaudhry; Khan Haneef; Islahuddin Siddique; Samiullah Khan; Manzoor Hussain; Munawwaruz Zaman; Zia Qamar; Nazim Salim; Shahnaz Sheikh; Saleem Sherwani; Iftikar Syed; Mudassar Syed; Manzoor-ul Hassan

== Football ==
Event	Gold	Silver	Bronze
Men's	East Germany; Hans-Ulrich Grapenthin; Wilfried Gröbner; Jürgen Croy; Gerd Weber; Hans-Jürgen Dörner; Konrad Weise; Lothar Kurbjuweit; Reinhard Lauck; Gert Heidler; Reinhard Häfner; Hans-Jürgen Riediger; Bernd Bransch; Martin Hoffmann; Gerd Kische; Wolfram Löwe; Hartmut Schade; Dieter Riedel	Poland; Jan Tomaszewski; Piotr Mowlik; Antoni Szymanowski; Jerzy Gorgoń; Wojciech Rudy; Władysław Żmuda; Zygmunt Maszczyk; Grzegorz Lato; Henryk Wawrowski; Henryk Kasperczak; Roman Ogaza; Kazimierz Kmiecik; Kazimierz Deyna; Andrzej Szarmach; Henryk Wieczorek; Lesław Ćmikiewicz; Jan Benigier	Soviet Union; Vladimir Astapovsky; Anatoly Konjkov; Viktor Matvienko; Mykhailo Fomenko; Stefan Reshko; Vladimir Troshkin; David Kipiani; Vladimir Onischenko; Viktor Kolotov; Vladimir Veremeev; Oleg Blokhin; Leonid Buryak; Vladimir Fyodorov; Aleksandr Minayev; Viktor Zvyagintsev; Leonid Nazarenko; Aleksandr Prokhorov

== Gymnastics ==
=== Men's events ===
Event	Gold	Silver	Bronze
Team all-around	Japan; Shun Fujimoto; Hisato Igarashi; Hiroshi Kajiyama; Sawao Kato; Eizo Kenmotsu; Mitsuo Tsukahara	Soviet Union; Nikolai Andrianov; Alexander Dityatin; Gennady Krysin; Vladimir Marchenko; Vladimir Markelov; Vladimir Tikhonov	East Germany; Roland Brückner; Rainer Hanschke; Bernd Jäger; Wolfgang Klotz; Lutz Mack; Michael Nikolay
Individual all-around	Nikolai Andrianov; Soviet Union	Sawao Kato; Japan	Mitsuo Tsukahara; Japan
Floor exercise	Nikolai Andrianov; Soviet Union	Vladimir Marchenko; Soviet Union	Peter Kormann; United States
Horizontal bar	Mitsuo Tsukahara; Japan	Eizo Kenmotsu; Japan	Eberhard Gienger; West Germany
Horizontal bar	Mitsuo Tsukahara; Japan	Eizo Kenmotsu; Japan	Henri Boerio; France
Parallel bars	Sawao Kato; Japan	Nikolai Andrianov; Soviet Union	Mitsuo Tsukahara; Japan
Pommel horse	Zoltán Magyar; Hungary	Eizo Kenmotsu; Japan	Nikolai Andrianov; Soviet Union
Pommel horse	Zoltán Magyar; Hungary	Eizo Kenmotsu; Japan	Michael Nikolay; East Germany
Rings	Nikolai Andrianov; Soviet Union	Alexander Dityatin; Soviet Union	Danuţ Grecu; Romania
Vault	Nikolai Andrianov; Soviet Union	Mitsuo Tsukahara; Japan	Hiroshi Kajiyama; Japan

=== Women's events ===
Event	Gold	Silver	Bronze
Team all-around	Soviet Union; Maria Filatova; Svetlana Grozdova; Nellie Kim; Olga Korbut; Elvira Saadi; Ludmila Tourischeva	Romania; Nadia Comăneci; Mariana Constantin; Georgeta Gabor; Anca Grigoraș; Gabriela Trușcă; Teodora Ungureanu	East Germany; Carola Dombeck; Gitta Escher; Kerstin Gerschau; Angelika Hellmann; Marion Kische; Steffi Kräker
Individual all-around	Nadia Comăneci; Romania	Nellie Kim; Soviet Union	Ludmila Tourischeva; Soviet Union
Balance beam	Nadia Comăneci; Romania	Olga Korbut; Soviet Union	Teodora Ungureanu; Romania
Floor exercise	Nellie Kim; Soviet Union	Ludmila Tourischeva; Soviet Union	Nadia Comăneci; Romania
Uneven bars	Nadia Comăneci; Romania	Teodora Ungureanu; Romania	Márta Egervári; Hungary
Vault	Nellie Kim; Soviet Union	Ludmila Tourischeva; Soviet Union; Carola Dombeck; East Germany	None awarded

== Handball ==
Event	Gold	Silver	Bronze
Men's tournament	Soviet Union; Aleksandr Anpilogov; Yevgeni Chernyshov; Anatoli Fedyukin; Valeri Gassy; Vasily Ilyin; Mykhaylo Ishchenko; Yuri Kidyaev; Yuri Klimov; Vladimir Kravtsov; Serhiy Kushniryuk; Yuriy Lahutyn; Vladimir Maksimov; Oleksandr Rezanov; Mykola Tomyn	Romania; Ştefan Birtalan; Adrian Cosma; Cezar Drăgăniṭă; Alexandru Fölker; Cristian Gaţu; Mircea Grabovschi; Roland Gunesch; Gabriel Kicsid; Ghiţă Licu; Nicolae Munteanu; Cornel Penu; Werner Stöckl; Constantin Tudosie; Radu Voina	Poland; Zdzisław Antczak; Janusz Brzozowski; Piotr Cieśla; Jan Gmyrek; Alfred Kałuziński; Jerzy Klempel; Zygfryd Kuchta; Jerzy Melcer; Ryszard Przybysz; Henryk Rozmiarek; Andrzej Sokołowski; Andrzej Szymczak; Mieczysław Wojczak; Włodzimierz Zieliński
Women's tournament	Soviet Union; Lyubov Berezhnaya; Lyudmyla Bobrus; Aldona Česaitytė; Tetyana Hlushchenko; Larysa Karlova; Mariya Litoshenko; Nina Lobova; Tetyana Makarets; Lyudmyla Panchuk; Rafiga Shabanova; Nataliya Sherstyuk; Lyudmila Shubina; Zinaida Turchyna; Halyna Zakharova	East Germany; Gabriele Badorek; Hannelore Burosch; Roswitha Krause; Waltraud Kretzschmar; Evelyn Matz; Liane Michaelis; Eva Paskuy; Kristina Richter; Christina Rost; Silvia Siefert; Marion Tietz; Petra Uhlig; Christina Voß; Hannelore Zober	Hungary; Éva Angyal; Mária Berzsenyi; Ágota Bujdosó; Klára Csíkné; Zsuzsanna Kéziné; Katalin Lakiné; Rozália Lelkesné; Márta Megyeriné; Ilona Nagy; Marianna Nagy; Erzsébet Németh; Amália Sterbinszky; Borbála Tóth Harsányi; Mária Vadászné

== Judo ==
Event	Gold	Silver	Bronze
Lightweight; 63 kg	Héctor Rodríguez; Cuba	Chang Eun-Kyung; South Korea	Felice Mariani; Italy József Tuncsik; Hungary
Half Middleweight; 70 kg	Vladimir Nevzorov; Soviet Union	Koji Kuramoto; Japan	Marian Tałaj; Poland Patrick Vial; France
Middleweight; 80 kg	Isamu Sonoda; Japan	Valeriy Dvoynikov; Soviet Union	Slavko Obadov; Yugoslavia Park Young-Chul; South Korea
Half-Heavyweight; 93 kg	Kazuhiro Ninomiya; Japan	Ramaz Kharshiladze; Soviet Union	Jürg Röthlisberger; Switzerland David Starbrook; Great Britain
Heavyweight +93 kg	Sergei Novikov; Soviet Union	Günther Neureuther; West Germany	Allen Coage; United States Sumio Endo; Japan
Open category	Haruki Uemura; Japan	Keith Remfry; Great Britain	Cho Jea-Ki; South Korea Shota Chochishvili; Soviet Union

== Modern pentathlon ==
Event	Gold	Silver	Bronze
Individual	Janusz Pyciak-Peciak; Poland	Pavel Lednyov; Soviet Union	Jan Bártů; Czechoslovakia
Team	Great Britain; Jim Fox; Danny Nightingale; Adrian Parker	Czechoslovakia; Jan Bártů; Bohumil Starnovský; Jiří Adam	Hungary; Tamás Kancsal; Tibor Maracskó; Szvetiszláv Sasics

== Rowing ==
=== Men's events ===
Event	Gold	Silver	Bronze
Single sculls	Pertti Karppinen; Finland	Peter-Michael Kolbe; West Germany	Joachim Dreifke; East Germany
Double sculls	Norway; Frank Hansen; Alf Hansen	Great Britain; Chris Baillieu; Michael Hart	East Germany; Uli Schmied; Jürgen Bertow
Quadruple sculls	East Germany; Wolfgang Güldenpfennig; Rüdiger Reiche; Karl-Heinz Bußert; Michael Wolfgramm	Soviet Union; Yevgeniy Duleyev; Yuriy Yakimov; Aivars Lazdenieks; Vytautas Butkus	Czechoslovakia; Jaroslav Hellebrand; Václav Vochoska; Zdeněk Pecka; Vladek Lacina
Coxless pair	East Germany; Jörg Landvoigt; Bernd Landvoigt	United States; Calvin Coffey; Mike Staines	West Germany; Peter van Roye; Thomas Strauß
Coxed pair	East Germany; Harald Jährling; Friedrich-Wilhelm Ulrich; Georg Spohr	Soviet Union; Dmitry Bekhterev; Yuri Shurkalov; Yuriy Lorentsson	Czechoslovakia; Oldřich Svojanovský; Pavel Svojanovský; Ludvík Vébr
Coxless four	East Germany; Siegfried Brietzke; Andreas Decker; Stefan Semmler; Wolfgang Mager	Norway; Ole Nafstad; Arne Bergodd; Finn Tveter; Rolf Andreassen	Soviet Union; Raul Arnemann; Nikolay Kuznetsov; Valeriy Dolinin; Anushavan Gassan-Dzhalalov
Coxed four	Soviet Union; Vladimir Eshinov; Nikolay Ivanov; Mikhail Kuznetsov; Aleksandr Klepikov; Aleksandr Lukyanov	East Germany; Andreas Schulz; Rüdiger Kunze; Walter Dießner; Ullrich Dießner; Johannes Thomas	West Germany; Hans-Johann Färber; Ralph Kubail; Siegfried Fricke; Peter Niehusen; Hartmut Wenzel
Eights	East Germany; Bernd Baumgart; Gottfried Döhn; Werner Klatt; Hans-Joachim Lück; Dieter Wendisch; Roland Kostulski; Ulrich Karnatz; Karl-Heinz Prudöhl; Karl-Heinz Danielowski	Great Britain; Richard Lester; John Yallop; Timothy Crooks; Hugh Matheson; David Maxwell; Jim Clark; Frederick Smallbone; Lenny Robertson; Patrick Sweeney	New Zealand; Ivan Sutherland; Trevor Coker; Peter Dignan; Lindsay Wilson; Joe Earl; Dave Rodger; Alec McLean; Tony Hurt; Simon Dickie

=== Women's events ===
Event	Gold	Silver	Bronze
Single sculls	Christine Scheiblich; East Germany	Joan Lind; United States	Yelena Antonova; Soviet Union
Double sculls	Bulgaria; Svetla Otsetova; Zdravka Yordanova	East Germany; Sabine Jahn; Petra Boesler	Soviet Union; Eleonora Kaminskaitė; Genovaitė Ramoškienė
Quadruple sculls	East Germany; Anke Borchmann; Jutta Lau; Viola Poley; Roswietha Zobelt; Liane Weigelt	Soviet Union; Anna Kondrachina; Mira Bryunina; Larisa Alexandrova; Galina Ermolaeva; Nadezhda Chernyshyova	Romania; Ioana Tudoran; Maria Micșa; Felicia Afrăsiloaie; Elisabeta Lazăr; Elena Giurcă
Coxless pair	Bulgaria; Siyka Kelbecheva; Stoyanka Gruycheva	East Germany; Angelika Noack; Sabine Dähne	West Germany; Edith Eckbauer; Thea Einöder
Coxed four	East Germany; Karin Metze; Bianka Schwede; Gabriele Lohs; Andrea Kurth; Sabine Heß	Bulgaria; Ginka Gyurova; Lilyana Vaseva; Reni Yordanova; Mariyka Modeva; Kapka Georgieva	Soviet Union; Nadezhda Sevostyanova; Lyudmila Krokhina; Galina Mishenina; Anna Pasokha; Lidiya Krylova
Eights	East Germany; Viola Goretzki; Christiane Knetsch; Ilona Richter; Brigitte Ahrenholz; Monika Kallies; Henrietta Ebert; Helma Lehmann; Irina Müller; Marina Wilke	Soviet Union; Lyubov Talalaeva; Nadezhda Roshchina; Klavdija Koženkova; Olena Zubko; Olha Kolkova; Nelli Tarakanova; Nadiya Rozhon; Olha Huzenko; Olha Puhovska	United States; Jackie Zoch; Anita DeFrantz; Carie Graves; Marion Greig; Anne Warner; Peggy McCarthy; Carol Brown; Gail Ricketson; Lynn Silliman

== Sailing ==
Event	Gold	Silver	Bronze
Finn	Jochen Schümann (GDR)	Andrei Balashov (URS)	John Bertrand (AUS)
470	West Germany; Frank Hübner; Harro Bode	Spain; Antonio Gorostegui; Pedro Millet	Australia; Ian Brown; Ian Ruff
Flying Dutchman	West Germany; Jörg Diesch; Eckart Diesch	Great Britain; Rodney Pattisson; Julian Brooke-Houghton	Brazil; Reinaldo Conrad; Peter Ficker
Tornado	Great Britain; Reginald White; John Osborn	United States; David McFaull; Michael Rothwell	West Germany; Jörg Spengler; Jörg Schmall
Tempest	Sweden; John Albrechtson; Ingvar Hansson	Soviet Union; Valentin Mankin; Vladislav Akimenko	United States; Dennis Conner; Conn Findlay
Soling	Denmark; Poul Richard Høj Jensen; Valdemar Bandolowski; Erik Hansen	United States; John Kolius; Walter Glasgow; Richard Hoepfner	East Germany; Dieter Below; Michael Zachries; Olaf Engelhardt

== Shooting ==
Event	Gold	Silver	Bronze
free pistol	Uwe Potteck (GDR)	Harald Vollmar (GDR)	Rudolf Dollinger (AUT)
rapid fire pistol	Norbert Klaar (GDR)	Jürgen Wiefel (GDR)	Roberto Ferraris (ITA)
running target	Aleksandr Gazov (URS)	Aleksandr Kediarov (URS)	Jerzy Greszkiewicz (POL)
rifle prone	Karlheinz Smieszek (FRG)	Ulrich Lind (FRG)	Gennadi Lushchikov (URS)
rifle three positions	Lanny Bassham (USA)	Margaret Murdock (USA)	Werner Seibold (FRG)
skeet	Josef Panáček (TCH)	Eric Swinkels (NED)	Wiesław Gawlikowski (POL)
Trap	Donald Haldeman (USA)	Armando Marques (POR)	Ubaldesco Baldi (ITA)

== Volleyball ==
Event	Gold	Silver	Bronze
Men's volleyball	Poland; Bronisław Bebel; Ryszard Bosek; Wiesław Gawłowski; Marek Karbarz; Lech Łasko; Zbigniew Lubiejewski; Mirosław Rybaczewski; Włodzimierz Sadalski; Edward Skorek; Włodzimierz Stefański; Tomasz Wójtowicz; Zbigniew Zarzycki	Soviet Union; Vladimir Chernyshov; Yefim Chulak; Vladimir Dorokhov; Aleksandr Ermilov; Vladimir Kondra; Oleh Molyboha; Anatoliy Polishchuk; Aleksandr Savin; Pāvels Seļivanovs; Yuri Starunsky; Vladimir Ulanov; Vyacheslav Zaytsev	Cuba; Alfredo Figueredo; Víctor García; Diego Lapera; Leonel Marshall Steward, Sr. Ernesto Martínez; Lorenzo Martínez; Jorge Pérez; Antonio Rodríguez; Carlos Salas; Victoriano Sarmientos; Jesús Savigne; Raúl Vilches
Women's volleyball	Japan; Yuko Arakida; Takako Iida; Katsuko Kanesaka; Kiyomi Kato; Echiko Maeda; Noriko Matsuda; Mariko Okamoto; Takako Shirai; Shoko Takayanagi; Hiromi Yano; Juri Yokoyama; Mariko Yoshida	Soviet Union; Larisa Bergen; Liudmila Chernyshova; Olga Kozakova; Natalya Kushnir; Nina Muradyan; Liliya Osadchaya; Anna Rostova; Lyubov Rudovskaya; Inna Ryskal; Lyudmila Shchetinina; Nina Smoleeva; Zoya Yusova	South Korea; Baik Myung-sun; Byon Kyung-ja; Chang Hee-sook; Jo Hea-jung; Jung Soon-ok; Lee Soon-bok; Lee Soon-ok; Ma Kum-ja; Park Mi-kum; Yoon Young-nae; Yu Jung-hye; Yu Kyung-hwa

== Weightlifting ==
Event	Gold	Silver	Bronze
Flyweight –52 kg	Aleksandr Voronin; Soviet Union	György Kőszegi; Hungary	Mohammad Nassiri; Iran
Bantamweight; 52–56 kg	Norair Nurikyan; Bulgaria	Grzegorz Cziura; Poland	Kenkichi Ando; Japan
Featherweight; 56–60 kg	Nikolay Kolesnikov; Soviet Union	Georghi Todorov; Bulgaria	Kazumasa Hirai; Japan
Lightweight; 60–67.5 kg	Pyotr Korol; Soviet Union	Daniel Senet; France	Kazimierz Czarnecki; Poland
Middleweight; 67.5–75 kg	Yordan Mitkov; Bulgaria	Vardan Militosyan; Soviet Union	Peter Wenzel; East Germany
Light-heavyweight; 75–82.5 kg	Valery Shary; Soviet Union	Trendafil Stoitchev; Bulgaria	Peter Baczako; Hungary
Middle-heavyweight; 82.5–90 kg	David Rigert; Soviet Union	Lee James; United States	Atanas Shopov; Bulgaria
Heavyweight; 90-110 kg	Yuri Zaitsev; Soviet Union	Krastiu Semerdzhiev; Bulgaria	Tadeusz Rutkowski; Poland
Super heavyweight +110 kg	Vasiliy Alekseyev; Soviet Union	Gerd Bonk; East Germany	Helmut Losch; East Germany

== Wrestling ==
=== Freestyle ===
Event	Gold	Silver	Bronze
48 kg	Hasan Isaev; Bulgaria	Roman Dmitriyev; Soviet Union	Akira Kudo; Japan
52 kg	Yuji Takada; Japan	Alexander Ivanov; Soviet Union	Jeon Hae-Sup; South Korea
57 kg	Vladimir Yumin; Soviet Union	Hans-Dieter Brüchert; East Germany	Masao Arai; Japan
62 kg	Yang Jung-Mo; South Korea	Zevegiin Oidov; Mongolia	Gene Davis; United States
68 kg	Pavel Pinigin; Soviet Union	Lloyd Keaser; United States	Yasaburo Sugawara; Japan
74 kg	Jiichiro Date; Japan	Mansour Barzegar; Iran	Stanley Dziedzic; United States
82 kg	John Peterson; United States	Viktor Novozhilov; Soviet Union	Adolf Seger; West Germany
90 kg	Levan Tediashvili; Soviet Union	Ben Peterson; United States	Stelică Morcov; Romania
100 kg	Ivan Yarygin; Soviet Union	Russell Hellickson; United States	Dimo Kostov; Bulgaria
+100 kg	Soslan Andiyev; Soviet Union	József Balla; Hungary	Ladislau Şimon; Romania

=== Greco-Roman ===
Event	Gold	Silver	Bronze
48 kg	Alexei Shumakov; Soviet Union	Gheorghe Berceanu; Romania	Stefan Angelov; Bulgaria
52 kg	Vitali Konstantinov; Soviet Union	Nicu Gingă; Romania	Koichiro Hirayama; Japan
57 kg	Pertti Ukkola; Finland	Ivan Frgić; Yugoslavia	Farhat Mustafin; Soviet Union
62 kg	Kazimierz Lipień; Poland	Nelson Davidyan; Soviet Union	László Réczi; Hungary
68 kg	Suren Nalbandyan; Soviet Union	Ștefan Rusu; Romania	Heinz-Helmut Wehling; East Germany
74 kg	Anatoly Bykov; Soviet Union	Vítězslav Mácha; Czechoslovakia	Karl-Heinz Helbing; West Germany
82 kg	Momir Petković; Yugoslavia	Vladimir Cheboksarov; Soviet Union	Ivan Kolev; Bulgaria
90 kg	Valery Rezantsev; Soviet Union	Stoyan Ivanov; Bulgaria	Czesław Kwieciński; Poland
100 kg	Nikolai Balboshin; Soviet Union	Kamen Goranov; Bulgaria	Andrzej Skrzydlewski; Poland
+100 kg	Alexander Kolchinsky; Soviet Union	Aleksandar Tomov; Bulgaria	Roman Codreanu; Romania

== See also ==
- 1976 Summer Olympics medal table
