= Rowing at the 1976 Summer Olympics – Women's coxed four =

Olympic rowing event

Women's coxed four at the Games of the XXI Olympiad
- Date: 19–24 July 1976
- Competitors: 40 from 8 nations

Medalists
1st place, gold medalist(s)		Karin Metze; Bianka Schwede; Gabriele Lohs; Andrea Kurth; Sabine Heß	East Germany
2nd place, silver medalist(s)		Ginka Gyurova; Lilyana Vaseva; Reni Yordanova; Mariyka Modeva; Kapka Georgieva	Bulgaria
3rd place, bronze medalist(s)		Nadezhda Sevostyanova; Lyudmila Krokhina; Galina Mishenina; Anna Pasokha; Lidiya Krylova	Soviet Union

The women's coxed four competition at the 1976 Summer Olympics took place at Notre Dame Island Olympic Basin, Canada. It was the first time the event was contested for women.

== Competition format ==
The competition consisted of two main rounds (heats and finals) as well as a repechage. The 8 boats were divided into two heats for the first round, with 4 boats in each heat. The winner of each heat advanced directly to the "A" final (1st through 6th place). The remaining 6 boats were placed in the repechage. A single repechage heat was held. The top 4 boats in the repechage went to the "A" final as well. The remaining 2 boats (5th and 6th place in the repechage) competed in the "B" final for 7th and 8th place.

All races were over a 1000 metre course.

== Results ==
=== Heats ===
==== Heat 1 ====
Rank	Rowers	Coxswain	Nation	Time	Notes
1	Gabriele Kühn; Andrea Kurth; Karin Metze; Bianka Schwede	Sabine Heß	East Germany	3:22.55	QA
2	Aurelia Marinescu; Elena Oprea; Florica Petcu-Dospinescu; Filigonia Tol	Aneta Matei	Romania	3:26.42	R
3	Pam Behrens; Judy Geer; Catherine Menges; Nancy Storrs	Mimi Kellogg	United States	3:32.77	R
4	Pauline Bird-Hart; Diana Bishop; Clare Grove; Gillian Webb	Pauline Wright	Great Britain	3:33.90	R

==== Heat 2 ====
Rank	Rowers	Coxswain	Nation	Time	Notes
1	Ginka Gyurova; Mariyka Modeva; Lilyana Vaseva; Reni Yordanova	Kapka Georgieva	Bulgaria	3:20.98	QA
2	Hette Borrias; Ans Gravesteijn; Myriam van Rooyen-Steenman; Liesbeth Vosmaer-de Bruin	Monique Pronk	Netherlands	3:23.94	R
3	Monika Draeger; Joy Fera; Linda Schaumleffel; Dolores Young	Barbara Mutch	Canada	3:24.23	R
4	Lyudmila Krokhina; Galina Mishenina; Anna Pasokha; Nadezhda Sevostyanova	Lidiya Krylova	Soviet Union	3:25.92	R

=== Repechage ===
Rank	Rowers	Coxswain	Nation	Time	Notes
1	Hette Borrias; Ans Gravesteijn; Myriam van Rooyen-Steenman; Liesbeth Vosmaer-de Bruin	Monique Pronk	Netherlands	3:39.88	QA
2	Aurelia Marinescu; Elena Oprea; Florica Petcu-Dospinescu; Filigonia Tol	Aneta Matei	Romania	3:40.96	QA
3	Lyudmila Krokhina; Galina Mishenina; Anna Pasokha; Nadezhda Sevostyanova	Lidiya Krylova	Soviet Union	3:42.44	QA
4	Pam Behrens; Judy Geer; Catherine Menges; Nancy Storrs	Mimi Kellogg	United States	3:43.27	QA
5	Monika Draeger; Joy Fera; Linda Schaumleffel; Dolores Young	Barbara Mutch	Canada	3:44.41	QB
6	Pauline Bird-Hart; Diana Bishop; Clare Grove; Gillian Webb	Pauline Wright	Great Britain	3:45.53	QB

=== Finals ===
==== Final B ====
Rank	Rowers	Coxswain	Nation	Time
7	Monika Draeger; Joy Fera; Linda Schaumleffel; Dolores Young	Barbara Mutch	Canada	3:46.18
8	Pauline Bird-Hart; Diana Bishop; Clare Grove; Gillian Webb	Pauline Wright	Great Britain	3:45.53

==== Final A ====
Rank	Rowers	Coxswain	Nation	Time
1st place, gold medalist(s)	Gabriele Kühn; Andrea Kurth; Karin Metze; Bianka Schwede	Sabine Heß	East Germany	3:45.08
2nd place, silver medalist(s)	Ginka Gyurova; Mariyka Modeva; Lilyana Vaseva; Reni Yordanova	Kapka Georgieva	Bulgaria	3:48.24
3rd place, bronze medalist(s)	Lyudmila Krokhina; Galina Mishenina; Anna Pasokha; Nadezhda Sevostyanova	Lidiya Krylova	Soviet Union	3:49.38
4	Aurelia Marinescu; Elena Oprea; Florica Petcu-Dospinescu; Filigonia Tol	Aneta Matei	Romania	3:51.17
5	Hette Borrias; Ans Gravesteijn; Myriam van Rooyen-Steenman; Liesbeth Vosmaer-de Bruin	Monique Pronk	Netherlands	3:54.36
6	Pam Behrens; Judy Geer; Catherine Menges; Nancy Storrs	Mimi Kellogg	United States	3:56.50

== Final classification ==
Rank	Rowers	Country
1st place, gold medalist(s)	Karin Metze; Bianka Schwede; Gabriele Lohs; Andrea Kurth; Sabine Heß	East Germany
2nd place, silver medalist(s)	Ginka Gyurova; Lilyana Vaseva; Reni Yordanova; Mariyka Modeva; Kapka Georgieva	Bulgaria
3rd place, bronze medalist(s)	Nadezhda Sevostyanova; Lyudmila Krokhina; Galina Mishenina; Anna Pasokha; Lidiya Krylova	Soviet Union
4	Elena Oprea; Florica Petcu-Dospinescu; Filigonia Tol; Aurelia Marinescu; Aneta Matei	Romania
5	Liesbeth Vosmaer-de Bruin; Hette Borrias; Myriam van Rooyen-Steenman; Ans Gravesteijn; Monique Pronk	Netherlands
6	Pam Behrens; Catherine Menges; Nancy Storrs; Judy Geer; Mimi Kellogg	United States
7	Linda Schaumleffel; Dolores Young; Monika Draeger; Joy Fera; Barbara Mutch	Canada
8	Gillian Webb; Pauline Bird-Hart; Clare Grove; Diana Bishop; Pauline Wright	Great Britain
