= Herta Weissig =

German rower

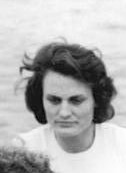
- Herta Weissig in 1960

Sport
- Sport: Rowing
- Club: DHfK Leipzig SC
Medal record
Women's rowing
Representing East Germany
European Rowing Championships
Bronze medal – third place	1957 Duisburg	Quad sculls
Silver medal – second place	1959 Mâcon	Quad sculls
Gold medal – first place	1960 London	Quad sculls

Herta Weissig is a retired German rower who won three medals in the quad sculls at the European championships of 1957–1960, two of them with Gisela Heisse. After retiring from competitions she worked as a rowing coach under the name Herta Weissig-Manger, coaching Angelika Noack, Sabine Dähne, Ute Steindorf, Marita Sandig, Renate Neu, Cornelia Klier, Gerlinde Doberschütz, Silvia Fröhlich, Ramona Kapheim, Ute Stange and Kirsten Wenzel among others.
