= 1978 World Rowing Championships =

International rowing event

- Logo of the 1978 World Rowing Championships
- Venue: Lake Karapiro
- Location: Cambridge, New Zealand
- Dates: 30 October – 5 November
- Nations: 28

The 1978 World Rowing Championships were World Rowing Championships that were held from 30 October to 5 November at Lake Karapiro near Cambridge, New Zealand. Twenty-eight countries were represented at the regatta. In the history of the World Rowing Championships, 1978 was the only year when the lightweight rowing championships were not held in conjunction with the open men and women event; the lightweight events had already been held in Copenhagen, Denmark, in August.

== Background ==
Lake Karapiro was formed in 1947 through a hydroelectric project on the Waikato River. It was soon recognised as the best rowing venue in New Zealand, and was used for the 1950 British Empire Games. World rowing championships had been held since 1962 by FISA, the World Rowing Federation, and in 1974 New Zealand was provisionally awarded the 1978 world event. Don Rowlands, who had won rowing medals at British Empire and Commonwealth Games in the 1950s and would later become chairman of the 1978 World Rowing Championships organising committee, had lobbied for the event to come to New Zealand; prior to 1978, the event had always been held in the Northern Hemisphere. He found a supporter in Thomas Keller, the president of FISA. There was also some curiosity amongst the rowing fraternity how a small island nation from the South Pacific managed to win gold medals at the 1968 and 1972 Summer Olympics, in men's coxed four and men's eight, respectively. But it was not until the 1976 Summer Olympics that 1978 event was confirmed, which left only two years to organise the event.

The entire event was organised by volunteers; the organising committee had no people in employment. Cyril Hilliard was the secretary of the organising committee. Volunteer labour erected a grandstand; all built with scaffolding. As Rowlands was a marine engineer, he designed the starting pontoon himself and the construction was carried out by James Hill, a former Olympic rower who was a joiner by trade. Hill also built the start and finish towers. A company donated 13 kit houses, and these were used as offices. Catering for the competitors was done by the New Zealand Army. It is estimated that in total, close to 100,000 spectators attended the four days of racing. Keller called it afterwards "the greatest regatta in living memory". Former British rower Dickie Burnell, who worked at Karapiro as a correspondent for The Times, labelled the event "the greatest show on water".

Twenty-eight countries were represented by their rowers in 140 boats, and this was the largest international sports competition that the country had organised up to that time. The event made a profit of NZ$155,000, which was used to fund a rowing foundation.

== Medal summary ==
Medallists at the 1978 World Rowing Championships were:

=== Men's events ===
In the single sculls and coxless pair boat classes, the first three boats from each heat qualified for the semi-final, and three further semi-finalists were determined via a repechage. In all other boat classes, the first from each heat qualified for the final, with the other finalists determined via a repechage.

Event:	Gold:	Time	Silver:	Time	Bronze:	Time
M1x	West Germany; Peter-Michael Kolbe	7:06.01	East Germany; Rüdiger Reiche	7:08.35	Yugoslavia; Milorad Stanulov	7:09.82
M2-	East Germany; Bernd Landvoigt (b); Jörg Landvoigt (s)	7:00.92	Great Britain; John Roberts (b); Jim Clark (s)	7:03.68	France; Dominique Lecointe (b); Jean-Claude Roussel (s)	7:06.32
M2+	East Germany; Jürgen Pfeiffer (b); Gert Uebeler (s); Olaf Beyer (cox)	7:27.43	Czechoslovakia; Karel Mejta Jr (b); Karel Neffe (s); Jiří Pták (cox)	7:30.49	Poland; Adam Tomasiak (b); Grzegorz Nowak (s); Ryszard Kubiak (cox)	7:33.73
M2x	Norway; Frank Hansen (b); Alf Hansen (s)	6:51.23	Great Britain; Chris Baillieu (b); Michael Hart (s)	6:53.67	Switzerland; Bruno Saile (b); Jürg Weitnauer (s)	6:58.43
M4-	Soviet Union; Vladimir Predbradzensky (b); Nikolay Kuznetsov (2); Valeriy Dolinin (3); Anatoly Nemtyryov (s)	6:19.25	East Germany; Siegfried Brietzke (b); Andreas Decker (2); Stefan Semmler (3); Wolfgang Mager (s)	6:19.52	Great Britain; John Beattie (b); Ian McNuff (2); David Townsend (3); Martin Cross (s)	6:26.28
M4+	East Germany; Ullrich Dießner (b); Gottfried Döhn (2); Walter Dießner (3); Dieter Wendisch (s); Andreas Gregor (cox)	6:30.25	West Germany; Wolf-Dieter Oschlies (b); Wolfram Thiem (2); Frank Schütze (3); Gabriel Konertz (s); Helmut Sassenbach (cox)	6:31.56	Bulgaria; Rumen Khristov (b); Tsvetan Petkov (2); Nasko Markov (3); Ivan Botev (s); Nenko Dobrev (cox)	6:37.06
M4x	East Germany; Joachim Dreifke (b); Karl-Heinz Bußert (2); Martin Winter (3); Frank Dundr (s)	6:08.94	France; Christian Marquis (b); Jean-Raymond Peltier (2); Roland Thibaut (3); Roland Weill (s)	6:11.05	West Germany; Dieter Wiedenmann (b); Albert Hedderich (2); Raimund Hörmann (3); Michael Dürsch (s)	6:11.88
M8+	East Germany; Matthias Schumann (b); Ulrich Karnatz (2); Gerd Sredzki (3); Andreas Ebert (4); Friedrich-Wilhelm Ulrich (5); Harald Jährling (6); Uwe Dühring (7); Bernd Höing (s); Bernd Kaiser (cox)	5:54.25	West Germany; Volker Sauer (b); Klaus Roloff (2); Fritz Schuster (3); Heribert Karches (4); Werner Hellwig (5); Winfried Ringwald (6); Thomas Scholl (7); Diethelm Maxrath (s); Hartmut Wenzel (cox)	5:55.17	New Zealand; Mark James (b); Greg Johnston (2); Dave Rodger (3); Des Lock (4); Ross Lindstrom (5); David Lindstrom (6); Ivan Sutherland (7); Noel Mills (s); Alan Cotter (cox)	5:57.16

=== Men's lightweight events ===
In the history of the World Rowing Championships, 1978 was the only year when the lightweight rowing championships were not held in conjunction with the open men and women event. The 1978 FISA Lightweight Championships were held in Copenhagen, Denmark, during August.

=== Women's events ===
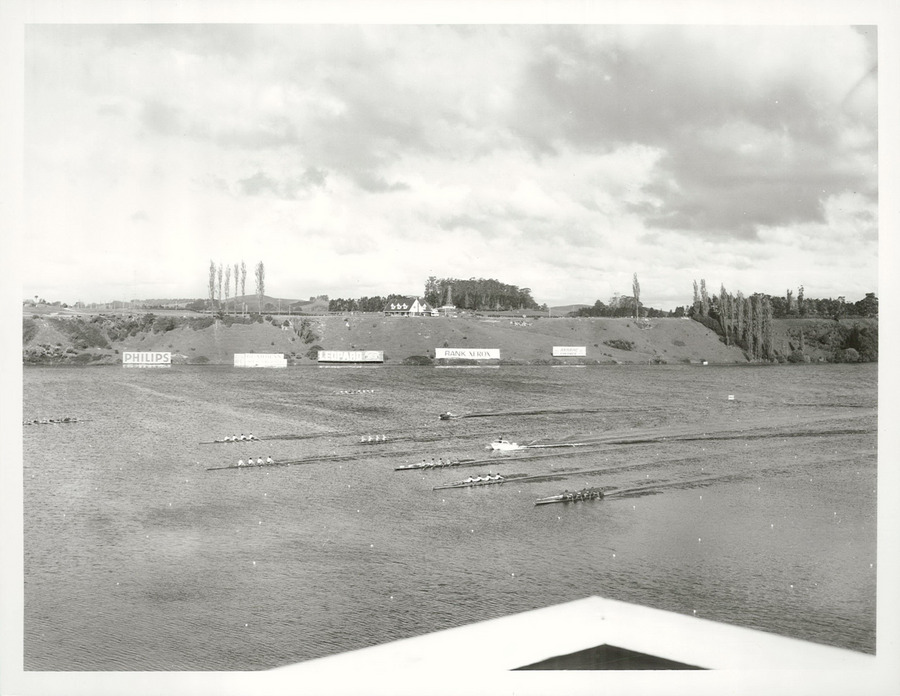
Final in the women's four, with East Germany winning

There were six boats nominated in the coxless pair and they went to the final without heats. In all other boat classes, the winner of each heat qualified for the final and all other finalists were determined via a repechage.

Event:	Gold:	Time	Silver:	Time	Bronze:	Time
W1x	East Germany; Christine Scheiblich	4:12.49	Soviet Union; Anna Kondrachina	4:14.43	Hungary; Mariann Ambrus	4:16.21
W2-	East Germany; Cornelia Klier (b); Ute Steindorf (s)	4:02.65	Canada; Elizabeth Craig (b); Susan Antoft (s)	4:02.87	Netherlands; Joke Dierdorp (b); Karin Abma (s)	4:05.38
W2x	Bulgaria; Svetla Otsetova (b); Zdravka Yordanova (s)	4:01.94	Soviet Union; Ludmila Parphjoonova (b); Eleonora Kaminskaitė (s)	4:04.19	United States; Elizabeth Hills-O'Leary (b); Lisa Hansen Stone (s)	4:04.77
W4+	East Germany; Kersten Neisser (b); Angelika Noack (2); Ute Skorupski (3); Marita Sandig (s); Kirsten Wenzel (cox)	3:48.47	United States; Carol Brown (b); Anita DeFrantz (2); Cozema Crawford (3); Nancy Storrs (s); Hollis Hatton (cox)	3:52.42	Romania; Elena Oprea (b); Florica Dospinescu (2); Florica Silaghi (3); Georgeta Militaru-Mașca (s); Aneta Matei (cox)	3:53.92
W4x+	Bulgaria; Anka Bakova (b); Dolores Nakova (2); Rositsa Spasova (3); Rumelyana Boncheva (s); Anka Georgieva (cox)	3:31.16	West Germany; Sabine Reuter (b); Petra Finke (2); Veronika Walterfang (3); Anne Dickmann (s); Kathrien Plückhahn (cox)	3:32.58	Soviet Union; Reet Palm (b); Yelena Khloptseva (2); Olga Vasilchenko (3); Nadesjda Kozotshkina (s); Nadezhda Chernyshyova (cox)	3:33.30
W8+	Soviet Union; Valentina Zhulina (b); Maria Paziun (2); Nina Antoniuk (3); Tatyana Bunjak (4); Nadezhda Dergatchenko (5); Nina Umanets (6); Elena Tereshina (7); Olga Pivovarova (s); Nina Frolova (cox)	3:22.00	East Germany; Silvia Arndt (b); Renate Neu (2); Dagmar Bauer (3); Gabriele Kühn (4); Petra Köhler (5); Henrietta Ebert (6); Birgit Schütz (7); Christiane Köpke (s); Marina Wilke (cox)	3:26.12	Canada; Joy Fera (b); Christine Neuland (2); Gail Cort (3); Monica Draeger (4); Elizabeth Jacklin (5); Kimberley Gordon (6); Dolores Young (7); Tricia Smith (s); Trudy Flynn (cox)	3:28.34

=== Event codes ===
New Zealand officials had expected their men to win three or four medals, and Rowlands stated that he expected the men's eight to win gold. In the end, the bronze won by New Zealand's eight was the host's only medal. This table does not include the lightweight events.

	single sculls	pair (coxless)	coxed pair	double sculls	four (coxless)	coxed four	quad sculls	quad sculls (coxed)	eight (coxed)
Men's	M1x	M2-	M2+	M2x	M4-	M4+	M4x		M8+
Women's	W1x	W2-		W2x		W4+		W4x+	W8+

=== Medal table ===
The medal table excludes the lightweight events.

Rank	Nation	Gold	Silver	Bronze	Total
1	East Germany (GDR)	8	3	0	11
2	Soviet Union (URS)	2	2	1	5
3	Bulgaria (BUL)	2	0	1	3
4	West Germany (FRG)	1	3	1	5
5	Norway (NOR)	1	0	0	1
6	Great Britain (GBR)	0	2	1	3
7	Canada (CAN)	0	1	1	2
7	France (FRA)	0	1	1	2
7	United States (USA)	0	1	1	2
10	Czechoslovakia (TCH)	0	1	0	1
11	Hungary (HUN)	0	0	1	1
11	Netherlands (NED)	0	0	1	1
11	New Zealand (NZL)	0	0	1	1
11	Poland (POL)	0	0	1	1
11	Romania (ROM)	0	0	1	1
11	Switzerland (SUI)	0	0	1	1
11	Yugoslavia (YUG)	0	0	1	1
Totals (17 entries)		14	14	14	42

== Finals ==
The Soviet Union were disqualified in the final of the women's coxed four.

Event	1st	2nd	3rd	4th	5th	6th
M1x	West Germany	East Germany	Yugoslavia	Soviet Union	Argentina	Finland
M2-	East Germany	Great Britain	France	Netherlands	Ireland	United States
M2+	East Germany	Czechoslovakia	Poland	West Germany	Bulgaria	Ireland
M2x	Norway	Great Britain	Switzerland	East Germany	United States	New Zealand
M4-	Soviet Union	East Germany	Great Britain	France	Czechoslovakia	West Germany
M4+	East Germany	West Germany	Bulgaria	United States	Australia	New Zealand
M4x	East Germany	France	West Germany	Czechoslovakia	Bulgaria	Spain
M8+	East Germany	West Germany	New Zealand	Australia	France	Bulgaria
W1x	East Germany	Soviet Union	Hungary	Bulgaria	United States	Romania
W2-	East Germany	Canada	Netherlands	Bulgaria	Romania	New Zealand
W2x	Bulgaria	Soviet Union	United States	Norway	Romania	East Germany
W4+	East Germany	United States	Romania	Bulgaria	Canada	Soviet Union (disqualified)
W4x+	Bulgaria	West Germany	Soviet Union	East Germany	Netherlands	Romania
W8+	Soviet Union	East Germany	Canada	United States	West Germany	Bulgaria

== Great Britain ==
Six men's teams and only one women's team from Great Britain competed at the championships.

Event		Notes
M1x	Tim Crooks	5th in B final
M2-	Jim Clark & John Roberts	Silver medal
M2+	N/A	no entry
M2x	Chris Baillieu & Michael Hart	Silver medal
M4-	Martin Cross, David Townsend, Ian McNuff, John Beattie (London RC)	Bronze medal
M4+	N/A	no entry
M4x	Allan Whitwell, Eric Sims, Charles Wiggin, Malcolm Carmichael	4th in B final
M8+	Lenny Robertson, Allan Whitwell, Henry Clay, Malcolm McGowan, Campbell, Gordon Rankine, Robert Milligan, Colin Seymour, Robert Lee (cox)	eliminated in repechage
W1x	N/A	no entry
W2-	N/A	no entry
W2x	Pauline Hart & Astrid Ayling	1st in B final
W4+	N/A	no entry
W4x+	N/A	no entry
W8+	N/A	no entry
