= Bernd Kaiser =

German rower

Personal information
- Born: 11 April 1951 (age 75)
- Height: 168 cm (5 ft 6 in)
- Weight: 51 kg (112 lb)

Sport
- Sport: Rowing
- Club: SC Berlin-Grünau
Medal record
Men's rowing
Representing East Germany
World Rowing Championships
Gold medal – first place	1978 Cambridge	Eight

Bernd Kaiser (born 11 April 1951) is a German coxswain. He was the cox of the East German eight that became world champion in 1978.

The 1.68 m tall and 51 kg heavy Kaiser started for SC Dynamo Berlin and won his first GDR national championship with the eight in 1972; however, that year the Olympic team did not take part in the championship. Kaiser won his second GDR championship title in 1978. For the 1978 World Rowing Championships on Lake Karapiro in New Zealand, an East German team was formed to which rowers from the winning and vice-champion boats of the GDR championships belonged. Matthias Schumann, Ulrich Karnatz, Gerd Sredzki, Andreas Ebert, Friedrich-Wilhelm Ulrich, Harald Jährling, Uwe Dühring, Bernd Höing and coxswain Kaiser were victorious in New Zealand, with West Germany and New Zealand winning the other medals.

At the GDR championships in 1981 and 1982, Kaiser coxed the third-placed eight. In 1983 he won his third GDR championship title in this boat class. Hendrik Reiher, however, replaced Kaiser at the 1983 World Rowing Championships. In 1983 and 1984, Kaiser won two further national titles with the coxed four.
