= Ute Skorupski =

East German rower

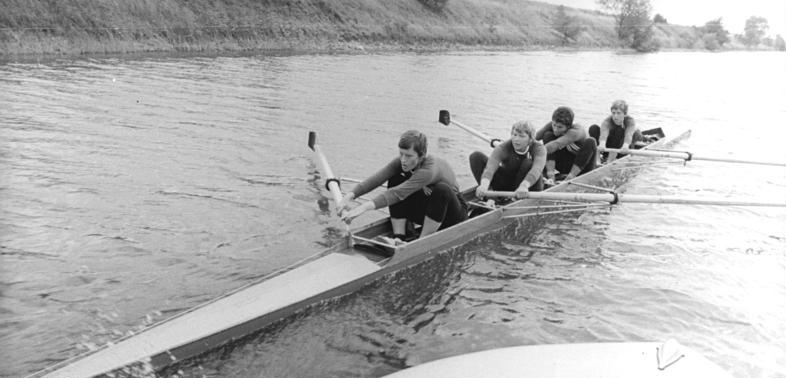
- Neisser, Noack, Skorupski, Sandig and (obscured) cox Wenzel in 1979

Personal information
- Born: 6 January 1959 (age 67)

Sport
- Sport: Rowing
- Club: SC DHfK, Leipzig
Medal record
Women's rowing
Representing East Germany
World Rowing Championships
Gold medal – first place	1978 Karapiro	Coxed four
Silver medal – second place	1979 Bled	Coxed four

Ute Skorupski (born 6 January 1959) is a rower who represented East Germany.

Starting for SC DHfK Leipzig, Skorupski became world champion in the coxed four at the 1978 World Rowing Championships on Lake Karapiro in New Zealand with Kersten Neisser, Angelika Noack, Marita Sandig, and Kirsten Wenzel as coxswain. Skorupski won a silver medal in coxed four at the 1979 World Rowing Championships in Bled, Yugoslavia.
