= Hette Borrias =

Dutch rower (born 1953)

Personal information
- Born: 8 April 1953 (age 73) Eindhoven, the Netherlands
- Height: 1.75 m (5 ft 9 in)
- Weight: 78 kg (172 lb)

Sport
- Sport: Rowing
- Club: Orca, Utrecht
Medal record
Representing the Netherlands
World Rowing Championships
Bronze medal – third place	1979 Bled	Single sculls
European Rowing Championships
Gold medal – first place	1973 Moscow	Coxed four

Henriette Louise "Hette" Borrias (born 8 April 1953) is a retired Dutch rower. She competed at the 1976 Summer Olympics in the coxed fours, together with Liesbeth Vosmaer-de Bruin, Myriam van Rooyen-Steenman, Ans Gravesteijn and Monique Pronk, and finished in fifth place. She won a European title in this event in 1973 and finished fifth at the 1975 World championships. In late 1970s she focused on single sculls and won a bronze medal at the 1979 World Championships. Next year she competed in this event at the 1980 Summer Olympics, but failed to reach the final.
