= Kersten Neisser =

German rower (born 1956)

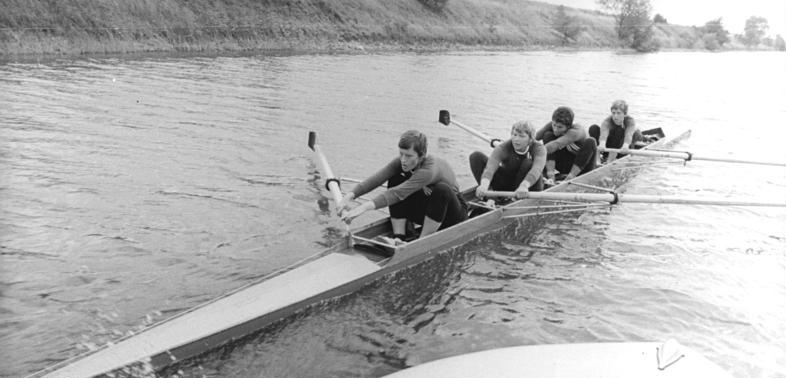
- Neisser, Noack, Skorupski, Sandig and (obscured) cox Wenzel in 1979

Personal information
- Born: 4 May 1956 (age 70) Halle, Saxony-Anhalt
- Height: 175 cm (5 ft 9 in)
- Weight: 70 kg (154 lb)

Sport
- Sport: Rowing
- Club: SC DHfK, Leipzig
Medal record
Women's rowing
Representing East Germany
Olympic Games
Gold medal – first place	1980 Moscow	Eight
World Rowing Championships
Gold medal – first place	1977 Amsterdam	Eight
Gold medal – first place	1978 Karapiro	Coxed four
Silver medal – second place	1979 Bled	Coxed four

Kersten Neisser (later Köpke and then Kriesel, born 4 May 1956 in Halle, Saxony-Anhalt) is a German rower.
