= Liesbeth Vosmaer-de Bruin =

Dutch rower (born 1946)

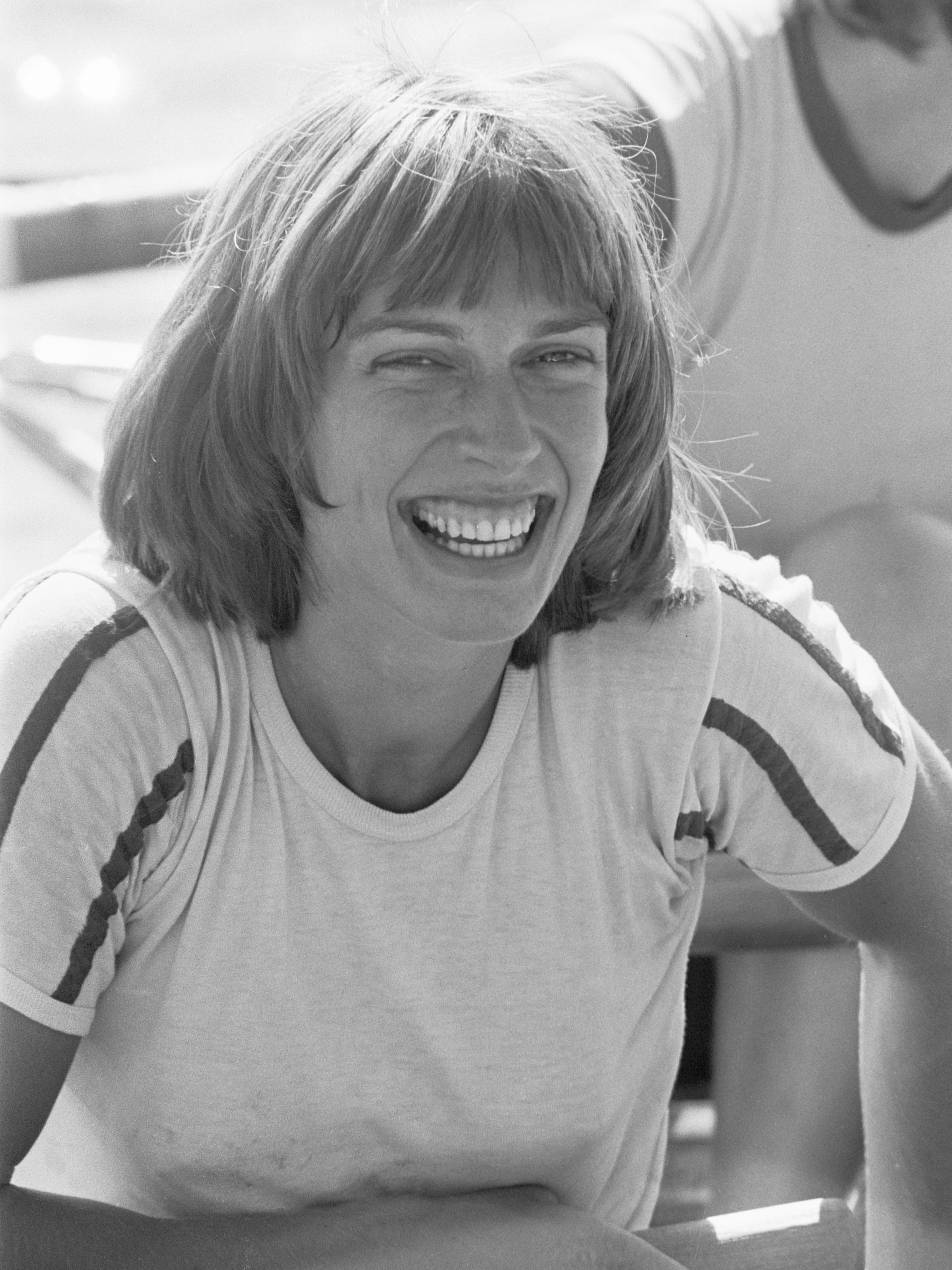
- Liesbeth Vosmaer in 1975

Personal information
- Born: 9 July 1946 (age 79) Amsterdam, the Netherlands
- Height: 180 cm (5 ft 11 in)
- Weight: 72 kg (159 lb)

Sport
- Sport: Rowing
- Club: Nereus, Amsterdam
Medal record
Representing the Netherlands
World Rowing Championships
| Silver medal – second place | 1974 Lucerne | Coxed four |
European Rowing Championships
| Gold medal – first place | 1973 Moscow | Coxed four |
| Bronze medal – third place | 1972 Brandenburg | Coxed four |

Liesbeth Simone Vosmaer-de Bruin (née de Bruin, born 9 January 1946) is a retired Dutch rower. She competed at the 1976 Summer Olympics in the coxed fours, together with Hette Borrias, Myriam van Rooyen-Steenman, Ans Gravesteijn and Monique Pronk, and finished in fifth place. She won a European title in this event in 1973, with Hette Borrias, Myriam van Rooyen-Steenman, Yvonne Vischschraper and Liesbeth Pascal-de Graaff. At the world championships, her team was fifth in 1975 and seventh in 1977 and 1978.
