= Mimi Kellogg =

American rower

Mary Louise Kellog Lyman
Personal information
- Full name: Mary Louise "Mimi" Kellogg Lyman
- National team: United States of America
- Born: December 30, 1953 (age 72) New York City, United States
- Education: Princeton University
- Spouse: Phil Lyman

Sport
- Sport: Rowing

Mimi Kellogg (born December 30, 1953) is an American rower. Kellogg attended Princeton University and was co-captain of the women's rowing team. She graduated from Princeton with a degree in aeronautical engineering in 1976. She later graduated from Massachusetts Institute of Technology with a master's degree in aerospace engineering in 1978. She competed in the debut women's coxed four event at the 1976 Summer Olympics, in which her crew placed 6th.

The crew of the first US women's coxed four which competed in Montreal was Pam Behrens, Cathy Menges, Nancy Storrs, and Judy Geer, coxed by Mimi Kellogg. Kellogg was the first American woman to cross an Olympic finish line in the sport of rowing, as the shell raced was bow-loaded.
