= Rowing at the 1980 Summer Olympics – Women's coxless pair =

Women's coxless pairs at the Games of the XXII Olympiad
- Venue: Krylatskoye Rowing Canal
- Date: 21–26 July 1980
- Competitors: 12 from 6 nations
- Winning time: 3:30.49

Medalists
1st place, gold medalist(s)		Ute Steindorf and Cornelia Klier	East Germany
2nd place, silver medalist(s)		Małgorzata Dłużewska and Czesława Kościańska	Poland
3rd place, bronze medalist(s)		Siika Barboulova and Stoyanka Kurbatova	Bulgaria

The women's coxless pairs rowing competition at the 1980 Summer Olympics took place at the Krylatskoye Rowing Canal, Moscow, Soviet Union. The event was held from 21 to 26 July.

== Heats ==
The fastest team in each heat advanced to the final. The remaining teams had to compete in the repechage for the remaining spots in the final.

=== Heat 1 ===
Rank	Athletes Names	Country	Time
1	Larisa Zavarzina; Galina Stepanova	Soviet Union	3:55.08
2	Ute Steindorf; Cornelia Klier	East Germany	4:00.17
3	Siika Barboulova; Stoyanka Kurbatova	Bulgaria	4:00.38

=== Heat 2 ===
Rank	Athletes Names	Country	Time
1	Małgorzata Dłużewska; Czesława Kościańska	Poland	3:56.08
2	Florica Dospinescu; Elena Oprea	Romania	4:04.74
3	Teréz Bednarik; Éva Molnár	Hungary	4:12.44

== Repechage ==
Three fastest teams in the repechage advanced to the final.

Rank	Athletes Names	Country	Time
1	Ute Steindorf; Cornelia Klier	East Germany	3:36.51
2	Florica Dospinescu; Elena Oprea	Romania	3:37.16
3	Siika Barboulova; Stoyanka Kurbatova	Bulgaria	3:37.48
4	Teréz Bednarik; Éva Molnár	Hungary	3:50.47

== Final ==
Rank	Athletes Names	Country	Time
1	Ute Steindorf; Cornelia Klier	East Germany	3:30.49
2	Małgorzata Dłużewska; Czesława Kościańska	Poland	3:30.95
3	Siika Barboulova; Stoyanka Kurbatova	Bulgaria	3:32.39
4	Florica Dospinescu; Elena Oprea	Romania	3:35.14
5	Larisa Zavarzina; Galina Stepanova	Soviet Union	4:12.53

== Sources ==
- The Official Report of the Games of the XXII Olympiad Moscow 1980 Volume Three (PDF) (PDF). p. 117. Archived from the original (PDF) on 27 September 2007.
