= Höing =

Höing is a German surname. Notable people with the surname include:

- Bernd Höing (born 1955), German rower
- Jens Höing (born 1987), German racing driver
