= Robert Lee (rowing) =

British coxswain rower

Personal information
- Nationality: British
- Born: June 16, 1954
- Died: 24 June 2018 (aged 64)

Sport
- Sport: Rowing
- Club: Leander Club; Quintin BC

Robert Lee (1952-2018) was a British coxswain who competed for Great Britain.

== Rowing career ==
Lee started his rowing career at St George's College, Weybridge and in 1973 coxed the Leander boat when they won the Head of the River Race. He was part of the Quintin eight that won the 1973 British Rowing Championships.

At the Henley Royal Regatta he was the cox of Leander when they won the Britannia Challenge Cup in 1975. He was part of the eight that reached the final and finished fifth at the 1977 World Rowing Championships in Amsterdam. The following year he once again coxed the British crew at the 1978 World Rowing Championships finishing seventh.
