= Diana Bishop =

British rower

Personal information
- Nationality: British
- Born: 28 September 1947 (age 78)

Sport
- Sport: Rowing
- Club: Wallingford RC

Diana Bishop (née Preston born 28 September 1947) is a retired British rower who competed for Great Britain at the 1976 Summer Olympics.

== Early life ==
Bishop studied at Durham University, where she was among the first cohort of students at Trevelyan College.

== Rowing career ==
Bishop won the single sculls and the quadruple sculls, rowing for the Wallingford Rowing Club, at the 1975 National Rowing Championships. This led to selection for the British lightweight single scull boat at the 1975 World Rowing Championships in Nottingham, she finished 12th overall after a sixth-place finish in the B final.

In 1976 she was chosen for Great Britain in the women's coxed four event with Pauline Bird-Hart, Clare Grove, Gillian Webb and Pauline Wright. The crew finished in eighth place.

== Personal life ==
She married fellow international rower Thomas Bishop.
