= Schwede =

Schwede is a surname. Notable people with the surname include:

- Franz Schwede (1888–1960), German politician
- Bianka Schwede (born 1953), German rower
- Tobias Schwede (born 1994), German footballer

== See also ==
- Schwedes, a surname
