= Clare Grove =

British rower

Personal information
- Nationality: British
- Born: 24 November 1953 (age 71); Surrey

Sport
- Sport: Rowing
- Club: Civil Service Ladies; Thames Tradesmen RC

Clare M Grove (born 24 November 1953) is a former British rower who competed at the 1976 Summer Olympics.

== Rowing career ==
Grove started rowing in 1971 at the Barn Elms Boathouse, while at St Mark's School in Fulham. She was part of a coxed four crew, with Maggie Lambourn, Chris Grimes, Mary Mackay and Pat Sly that won the national title rowing for a Civil Service Ladies, at the 1973 National Championships. The following year with Chris Aistrop, Lambourn and Grimes, in a Civil Service and Weybridge Ladies composite she successfully defended the title, at the 1974 National Championships. During the same year she was selected for Great Britain at the 1974 World Rowing Championships which was the inaugural championships for women. Competing in the quadruple sculls event the crew were eliminated in the heats. She then represented her country again at the 1975 World Rowing Championships and won the coxed fours at the 1975 British Rowing Championships.

One year later she was selected for Great Britain in the women's coxed four crew for the 1976 Olympic Games in Montreal. The crew also containing Pauline Bird, Diana Bishop, Gill Webb and Pauline Wright finished in eight place.

At the end of 1976 she was suffering from a Multiple Sclerosis relapse but still competed for Great Britain in a third World Championship, when selected for the 1979 World Rowing Championships.

== Personal life ==
She married fellow Olympian rower Andrew Bayles.
