= 1972 European Rowing Championships =

- Venue: Beetzsee
- Location: Brandenburg an der Havel, Brandenburg, East Germany
- Dates: 10–13 August 1972
- Nations: 20

The 1972 European Rowing Championships were rowing championships held at the regatta course on the Beetzsee in Brandenburg, which was then located in East Germany. There were five competitions for women only; the events for men were contested at the 1972 Summer Olympics in Munich, West Germany, instead. As World Rowing Championships were still held at four-year intervals at the time, the European Rowing Championships were open to nations outside of Europe and had become to be regarded as quasi-world championships.

It was only in March 1972 that the East German rowing association took on organising the championships that were held from 10 to 13 August 1972 and that saw entries from 20 nations. The first sixteen nations that put their nominations forward were the Soviet Union, Hungary, Romania, Bulgaria, Austria, Sweden, Poland, Denmark, Czechoslovakia, West Germany, the Netherlands, France, Great Britain, Belgium, Australia, and the host East Germany. Later registrations included the United States and New Zealand. The host country held its rowing championships at the same venue a month earlier not just to determine their national champions, but also to find the women that should get nominations for the European championships.

== Medal summary – women's events ==
Event	Gold		Silver		Bronze	
Event	Country & rowers	Time	Country & rowers	Time	Country & rowers	Time
W1x	Netherlands; Ingrid Munneke-Dusseldorp	3:59.02	France; Annick Anthoine	4:01.78	East Germany; Anita Kuhlke	4:05.25
W2x	Soviet Union; Galina Suslina; Elena Kondrashina	3:42.42	Netherlands; Truus Bauer; Toos van Akkeren	3:44.08	France; Marie-Claire Barnier; Renée Camu	3:44.18
W4+	Soviet Union; Nina Bystrova; Evdokia Riabova; Nina Abramova; Nina Filatova; Zoia Mironova (cox)	3:41.32	East Germany; Renate Schlenzig; Sabine Dähne; Angelika Noack; Rosel Nitsche; Gudrun Apelt (cox)	3:44.69	Netherlands; Liesbeth de Bruin; Pauline Luynenburg; Myriam Steenman; Yvonne Jacobi; Yvonne Vischschraper (cox)	3:46.50
W4x+	Romania; Teodora Boicu; Maria Micșa; Ileana Nemet; Mărioara Singiorzan; Maria Ghiata (cox)	3:31.82	Soviet Union; Vera Fjodoreva; Ada Timofeyeva; Raissa Karatayeva; Vera Nikolskaya; Ludmila Arsakovskaya (cox)	3:32.68	West Germany; Ute Meyer; Marlies Meyer; Marlies Schätze; Karola Kleinschmidt; Renate Gruenke (cox)	3:36.70
W8+	Soviet Union; Elena Morozova; Tatyana Petrova; Zoia Sitnikova; Elena Shvachko; Anna Pasokha; Nadejda Bondareva; Valentina Kulikova; Alla Kuleshova; Lidiya Krylova (cox)	3:18.53	Romania; Ecaterina Trancioveanu; Viorica Lincaru; Elena Oprea; Cristel Wiener; Florica Petcu; Elena Gawluk; Marioara Constantin; Georgeta Alexe; Aneta Sieburg (cox)	3:20.67	East Germany; Ute Bahr; Maria Notbohm; Susanne Spitzer; Marita Jaschke; Sabine Schulz; Monika Mittenzwei; Regine Forkel; Irmhild Schulz; Christine Rösch (cox)	3:21.17

== Medals table ==
Rank	Nation	Gold	Silver	Bronze	Total
1	Soviet Union (URS)	3	1	0	4
2	Netherlands (NED)	1	1	1	3
3	Romania (ROU)	1	1	0	2
4	East Germany (GDR)	0	1	2	3
5	France (FRA)	0	1	1	2
6	West Germany (FRG)	0	0	1	1
Totals (6 entries)		5	5	5	15
