= Vasiev =

Vasiev is a surname. Notable people with the surname include:

- Dilshod Vasiev (born 1988), Tajikistani footballer
- Farkhod Vasiev (born 1990), Tajikistani footballer

== See also ==
- Vasev
