= Monika Draeger =

Canadian rower

Personal information
- Born: 16 August 1953 (age 71); Niagara Falls, Ontario, Canada

Sport
- Sport: Rowing

Monika Draeger (born 16 August 1953) is a Canadian rower. She competed in the women's coxed four event at the 1976 Summer Olympics.
