= Larisa Zavarzina =

Personal information
- Born: 24 December 1955 (age 70)
- Height: 175 cm (5 ft 9 in)
- Weight: 80 kg (176 lb)

Sport
- Sport: Rowing
Medal record
Women's rowing
Representing the Soviet Union
World Rowing Championships
Gold medal – first place	1982 Lucerne	Coxed four

Larisa Zavarzina (born 24 December 1955) is a rower who competed for the Soviet Union. She was a 1982 World Champion who also competed at the 1980 Summer Olympics in Moscow with the women's coxless pair where they came fifth.
