= Éva Molnár =

Hungarian rower

Personal information
- Nationality: Hungarian
- Born: 25 May 1958 (age 66); Budapest, Hungary

Sport
- Sport: Rowing

Éva Molnár (born 25 May 1958) is a Hungarian rower. She competed in the women's coxless pair event at the 1980 Summer Olympics.
