= Barbara Mutch =

Canadian rower

Personal information
- Born: 27 October 1953 (age 71); Cornwall, Ontario, Canada

Sport
- Sport: Rowing

Barbara Mutch (born 27 October 1953) is a Canadian rower. She competed in the women's coxed four event at the 1976 Summer Olympics.
