= Elena Oprea =

Romanian rower (born 1953)

Personal information
- Born: 5 October 1953 (age 72)

Sport
- Sport: Rowing
Medal record
Representing Romania
World Rowing Championships
Bronze medal – third place	1974 Lucerne	Eight
Bronze medal – third place	1975 Nottingham	Eight
Bronze medal – third place	1978 Karapiro	Coxed four
Silver medal – second place	1979 Bled	Coxless pair
European Rowing Championships
Bronze medal – third place	1971 Copenhagen	Eight
Silver medal – second place	1972 Brandenburg	Eight

Elena Oprea (born 5 October 1953) is a retired Romanian rower. She competed in international events from 1971 to 1980, including the 1976 and 1980 Olympics. She won silver and bronze medals at European and World Rowing Championships in the women's eight and the coxless pair. At the 1976 Olympics, she came fourth in the coxed four and sixth in the women's eight. At the 1980 Olympics, she came fourth in the coxless pair.
