= Czesława Kościańska =

Polish rower

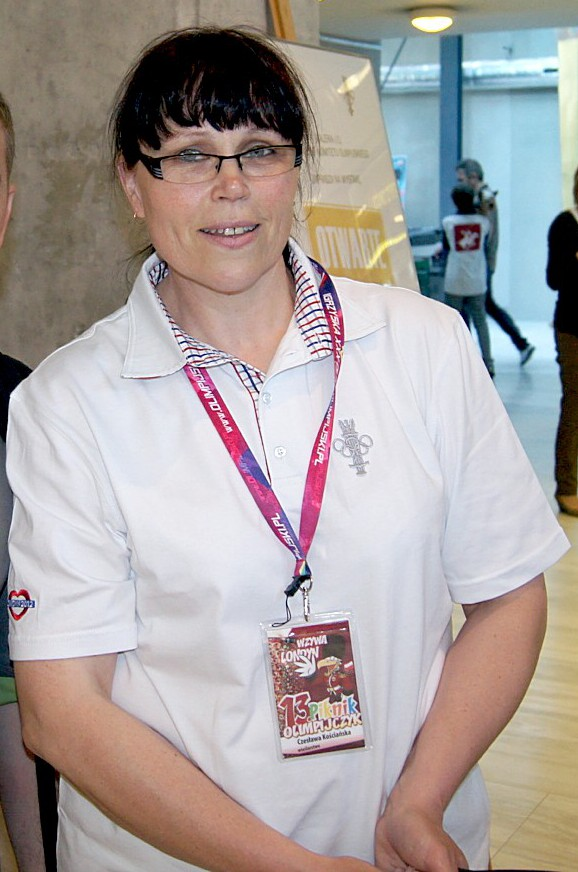
- Kościańska in 2012

Personal information
- Full name: Czesława Helena Kościańska-Szczepińska
- Born: 22 May 1959 (age 67) Tczew, Poland
Medal record
Women's rowing
Representing Poland
Olympic Games
Silver medal – second place	1980 Moscow	Coxless pair
World Championships
Silver medal – second place	1982 Lucerne	W2-
Bronze medal – third place	1979 Bled	W2-

Czesława Helena Kościańska-Szczepińska (born 22 May 1959 in Tczew) is a Polish rower.
