= Vasev =

Vasev (Bulgarian: Васев), feminine Vaseva (Bulgarian: Васева) is a Bulgarian surname. Notable people with the surname include:

- Bozhidar Vasev (born 1993), Bulgarian footballer
- Dimitar Vasev (born 1965), Bulgarian footballer and manager
- Elina Vaseva (born 1986), Bulgarian sport wrestler
- Lilyana Vaseva (born 1955), Bulgarian rower
