= Linda Schaumleffel =

Canadian rower

Personal information
- Nationality: Canadian
- Born: 24 February 1949 (age 76); Vernon, British Columbia, Canada

Sport
- Sport: Rowing

Linda Schaumleffel (born 24 February 1949) is a Canadian rower. She competed in the women's coxed four event at the 1976 Summer Olympics.
