= 1975 British Rowing Championships =

- Venue: National Water Sports Centre
- Location: Holme Pierrepont (Nottingham)
- Dates: 19–20 July 1975

The 1975 National Rowing Championships was the fourth edition of the National Championships, held from 19–20 July 1975 at the National Water Sports Centre in Holme Pierrepont, Nottingham.

== Senior ==
=== Medal summary ===
Event	Gold	Silver	Bronze
Men Victor Ludorum	Leander	Thames Tradesmen's	London University
Men 1x	Poplar; Kenny Dwan	York City; Allan Whitwell	Argosies; Martin Spencer
Men 2+	London University		City Orient
Men 2x	Leander; Michael Hart & Chris Baillieu	Molesey / Weybridge; K Gee & Peter Levy	Upper Thames; P E Johnson & S M Johnson
Men 2-	Leander / Thames Tradesmen's; Glyn Locke & Frederick Smallbone	Henley; A A Glenn & P J Marsden	St Ives; Tony Cowley & Nigel Drake
Men 4-	Leander / Thames Tradesmen's	Lady Margaret	Thames Tradesmen's
Men 4+	Leander / Thames Tradesmen's	London University	Tideway Scullers School
Men 4x	Leander / Quintin / Thames / Thames Tradesmen's / Weybridge; Tom Bishop	Poplar / Argosies / Vesta	Kingston
Men 8+	Leander / Thames Tradesmen's	Eton College / Eton Vikings / Henley / Leander / Thames Tradesmen's	Tideway Scullers School
Women Victor Ludorum	Civil Service Ladies	Derby	Thames
Women 1x	Wallingford; Diana Bishop	Ann Cork	Jessamy Scullers; Christine Davies
Women 2x	Civil Service Ladies / Weybridge Ladies; Jackie Darling & Pauline Bird		Wallingford; Diana Bishop & Jean Rankine
Women 2-	Civil Service Ladies / Stuart Ladies; Lin Clark & Gill Webb		Civil Service Ladies / St George's; Clare Grove & Beryl Mitchell
Women 4+	Civil Service Ladies / Stuart Ladies / St George's; Lin Clark, Gill Webb, Clare Grove, Beryl Mitchell, Pauline Wright		
Women 4x	Civil Service Ladies / Weybridge Ladies / Wallingford / Stuart Ladies; Jackie Darling, Pauline Bird, Diana Bishop, Gill Webb, Sue Bailey		

== Lightweight ==
=== Medal summary ===
Event	Gold	Silver	Bronze
Men 1x	Peterborough City; Peter Zeun	London Transport District	Reading
Men 4-	Balliol College / London	University College Hospital	Nottingham & Union
Men 8+	Nautilus	Cambridge University	Thames

== Junior ==
=== Medal summary ===
Event	Gold	Silver	Bronze
Men 1x	Thames		
Men 2-	Maidenhead		
Men 2x	Abingdon / John Mason High School		
Men 2+	Wallingford / Wallingford Schools		
Men 4-	Cardinal Vaughan School / Ealing High School		
Men 4+	Wallingford / Wallingford Schools		
Men 4x	Eton College / Maidenhead		
Men 8+	Emanuel School		
Men J16 1x	King's School Worcester		
Men J16 2-	Pangbourne College		
Men J16 2x	St Ives		
Men J16 2+	St Edward's School		
Men J16 4+	St Edward's School		
Men J16 4-	Hereford		
Men J16 8+	Radley College		
Women 4+	Elmwood School		

Key

Symbol	meaning
1, 2, 4, 8	crew size
+	coxed
-	coxless
x	sculls
14	Under-14
15	Under-15
16	Under-16
J	Junior
