= Pauline Bird-Hart =

British rower

Personal information
- Nationality: British
- Born: Pauline Bird; 31 July 1957 (age 68)

Sport
- Sport: Rowing
- Club: Kingston RC; Tideway Scullers School
Medal record
Rowing
Representing England
Commonwealth Games
Silver medal – second place	1986 Edinburgh	coxless pair
Silver medal – second place	1986 Edinburgh	eight

Pauline Bird-Hart (born 31 July 1957) is a British retired rower who competed at the 1976 Summer Olympics and the 1980 Summer Olympics.

== Rowing career ==
Bird married fellow national champion rower Michael Hart in late 1976, then competing as Pauline Hart until 1980.

She was part of a composite quadruple sculls crew, that 1974 National Championships. Later that year she participated in the 1974 World Rowing Championships in Lucerne, which was the inaugural championships for women. Competing in the quadruple sculls event the crew were eliminated in the heats. She won the double sculls with Jackie Darling, rowing for a Civil Service and Weybridge Ladies composite and the quadruple sculls, at the 1975 National Rowing Championships, followed by the 1975 World Rowing Championships in Nottingham, where the crew finished 9th overall after a third-place finish in the B final. She was selected to represent Great Britain in the women's coxed fours event at the 1976 Olympics, with Diana Bishop, Clare Grove, Gill Webb and Pauline Wright, where they finished in eighth place.

In 1977 she was part of the double scull that reached the final and finished fifth at the 1977 World Rowing Championships in Amsterdam. This was the first time that a British women's crew had reached a world final. She won the 1977 National Championships and 1978 National Championships double sculls title rowing for Kingston with Astrid Ayling and the single sculls title in 1978. At the 1979 National Championships she was part of the composite crew that won the quadruple sculls. In 1980 she went to her second Olympic Games when as part of the women's coxed four, the crew finished in sixth place.

As part of the double sculls with Sandy Lutz she won the national title, at the 1983 National Rowing Championships. She represented England and won two silver medals in the eight and the coxless pair with Flo Johnston, at the 1986 Commonwealth Games in Edinburgh, Scotland.

She won another national title in 1987 in the double sculls with Julia Spence rowing for the Tideway Scullers School at the 1987 National Championships.
