= Teréz Bednarik =

Hungarian rower

Personal information
- Nationality: Hungarian
- Born: 20 July 1957 (age 67); Örkény, Hungary

Sport
- Sport: Rowing

Teréz Bednarik (born 20 July 1957) is a Hungarian rower. She competed in the women's coxless pair event at the 1980 Summer Olympics.
