= Ross Lindstrom =

New Zealand rower

Ross Lindstrom is a retired New Zealand rower. He won a bronze medal with the men's eight at the 1978 World Rowing Championships at Lake Karapiro near Cambridge, New Zealand. He was not part of the New Zealand eight that won silver at Bled in Slovenia at the 1979 World Rowing Championships, but was part of the men's eight again at the 1981 World Rowing Championships in Munich where the team came seventh. He trained with the New Zealand eight at Lake Karapiro in 1983 but did not travel to the world championships that year.

Lindstrom is currently rowing coach at St Bede's College in Christchurch.
