= Angelika Noack =

German rower (born 1952)

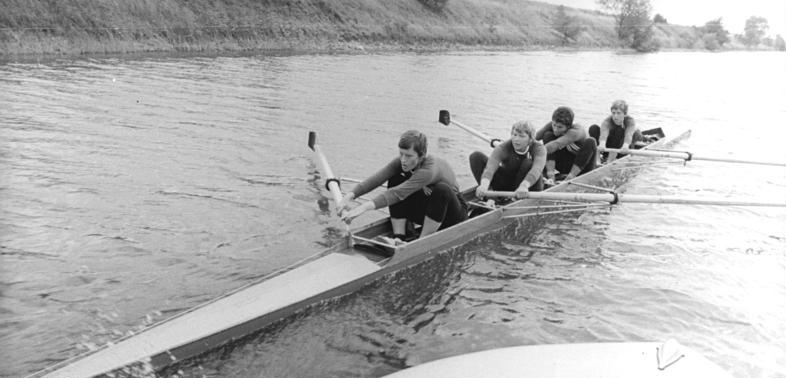
- 1979 from left: Kersten Neisser, Noack, Ute Skorupski, Marita Sandig, and coxswain Kirsten Wenzel

Personal information
- Born: 20 October 1952 (age 73) Angermünde, East Germany

Sport
- Sport: Rowing
Medal record
Women's rowing
Representing East Germany
Olympic Games
Gold medal – first place	1980 Moscow	Coxed four
Silver medal – second place	1976 Montreal	Coxless pair
World Championships
Gold medal – first place	1974 Lucerne	Coxed four
Gold medal – first place	1975 Nottingham	Coxless pair
Gold medal – first place	1977 Amsterdam	Coxless pair
Gold medal – first place	1978 Cambridge	Coxed four
Silver medal – second place	1979 Bled	Coxed four
Bronze medal – third place	1982 Lucerne	Eight
European Championships
Silver medal – second place	1972 Brandenburg	Coxed four
Silver medal – second place	1973 Moscow	Coxed four
Bronze medal – third place	1971 Copenhagen	Coxed four

Angelika Noack (born 20 October 1952) is a German rower who competed for East Germany in the 1976 Summer Olympics and in the 1980 Summer Olympics.

She was born in Angermünde. In 1976, she and her partner Sabine Dähne won the silver medal in the coxless pairs event. Four years later she was a crew member of the East German boat which won the gold medal in the coxed pairs competition.
