= Schwedes =

Schwedes is a surname. Notable people with the surname include:

- Gerhard Schwedes (born 1938), German player of American football
- Scott Schwedes (born 1965), American football player
- Richard Schwedes (born 1968), Bishop Lutheran Church of Australia - New South Wales and Australian Capital Territory District and New Zealand District

== See also ==
- Schwede, a surname
