= Galina Stepanova (rower) =

Soviet rower

Personal information
- Nationality: Soviet
- Born: 26 February 1958 (age 67)

Sport
- Sport: Rowing

Galina Stepanova (born 26 February 1958) is a Soviet rower. She competed in the women's coxless pair event at the 1980 Summer Olympics.
