= Alla Kuleshova =

Russian rower

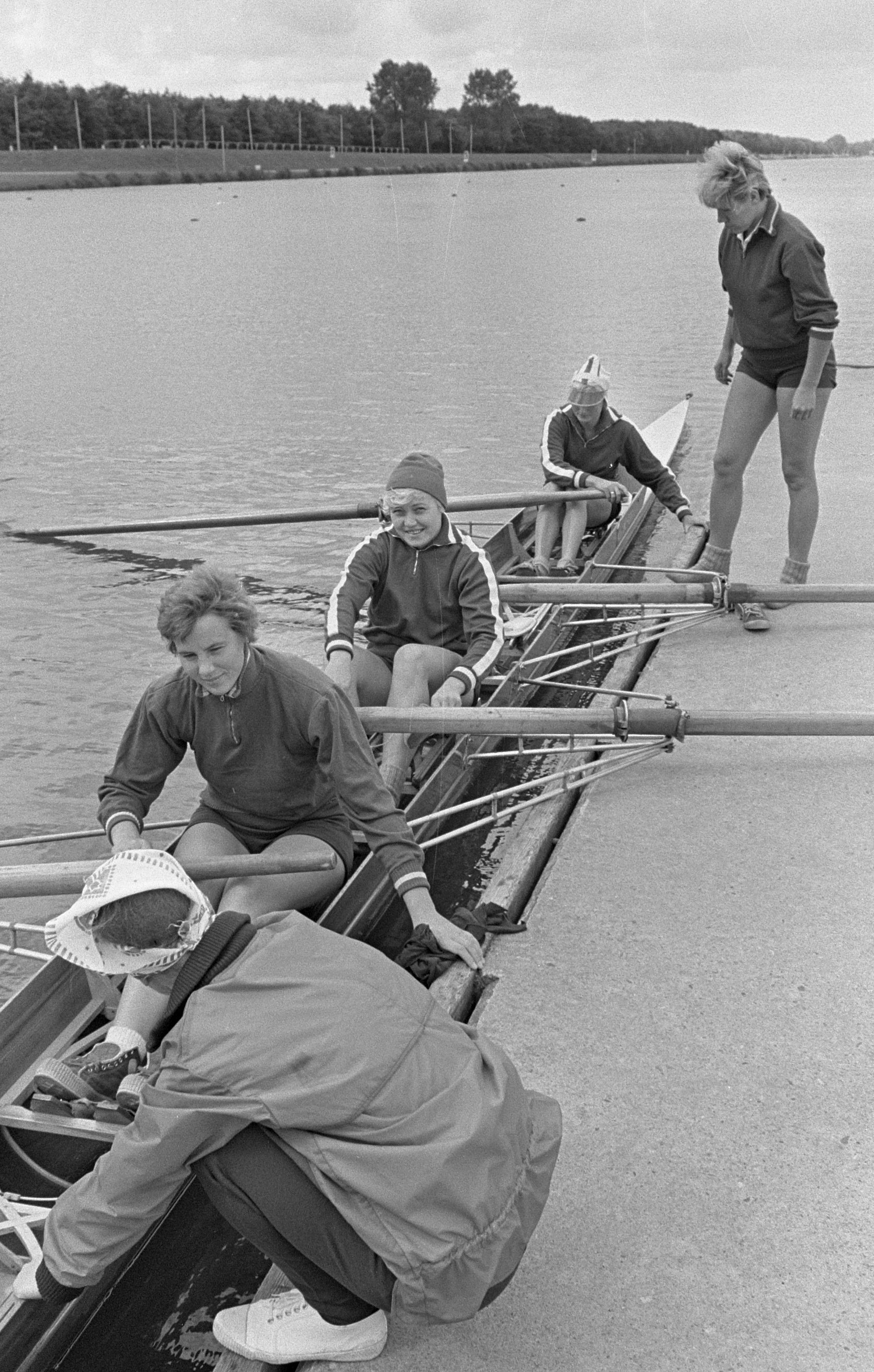
- Soviet coxed four at the 1966 European Championships, Kuleshova is likely 1st from right

Personal information
- Full name: Alla Vladimirovna Kuleshova
- Born: 28 March 1945 (age 81) Moscow, Russia

Sport
- Sport: Rowing
- Club: Dynamo
Medal record
Women's rowing
Representing the Soviet Union
European Championships
Gold medal – first place	1966 Amsterdam	Coxed four
Gold medal – first place	1971 Copenhagen	Coxed four
Gold medal – first place	1972 Brandenburg	Eight

Alla Vladimirovna Kuleshova (Russian: Алла Владимировна Кулешова, born 28 March 1945) is a retired Russian rower who won three European titles in 1966–1972.
