= Karin Metze =

German rower (born 1956)

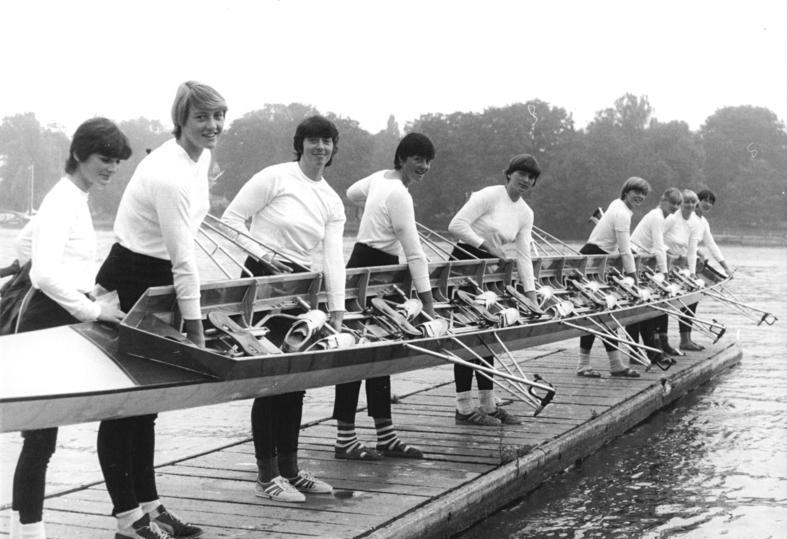
- 1982 from the left: Kirsten Wenzel (coxswain), Claudia Noack, Ute Steindorf, Sabine Portius, Carola Miseler, Steffi Götzelt, Sigrid Anders, Iris Rudolph, and Karin Metze

Personal information
- Born: 21 August 1956 (age 69) Meissen, East Germany
- Height: 180 cm (5 ft 11 in)
- Weight: 82 kg (181 lb)

Sport
- Sport: Rowing
- Club: SC Einheit Dresden
Medal record
Women's rowing
Representing East Germany
Olympic Games
Gold medal – first place	1976 Montreal	Coxed four
Gold medal – first place	1980 Moscow	Eight
World Rowing Championships
Gold medal – first place	1977 Amsterdam	Eight

Karin Metze (later Ulbricht, born 21 August 1956) is a German rower who competed for East Germany in the 1976 Summer Olympics and in the 1980 Summer Olympics.

She was born in Meissen. In 1976, she was a crew member of the East German boat, which won the gold medal in the coxed four event. Four years later, she won her second gold medal with the East German boat in the eight competition.
