= Małgorzata Dłużewska =

Polish rower

Medal record

Women's rowing

Representing Poland

Olympic Games
Silver medal – second place	1980 Moscow	Coxless pair

World Rowing Championships
Silver medal – second place	1982 Lucerne	W2-
Bronze medal – third place	1979 Bled	W2-

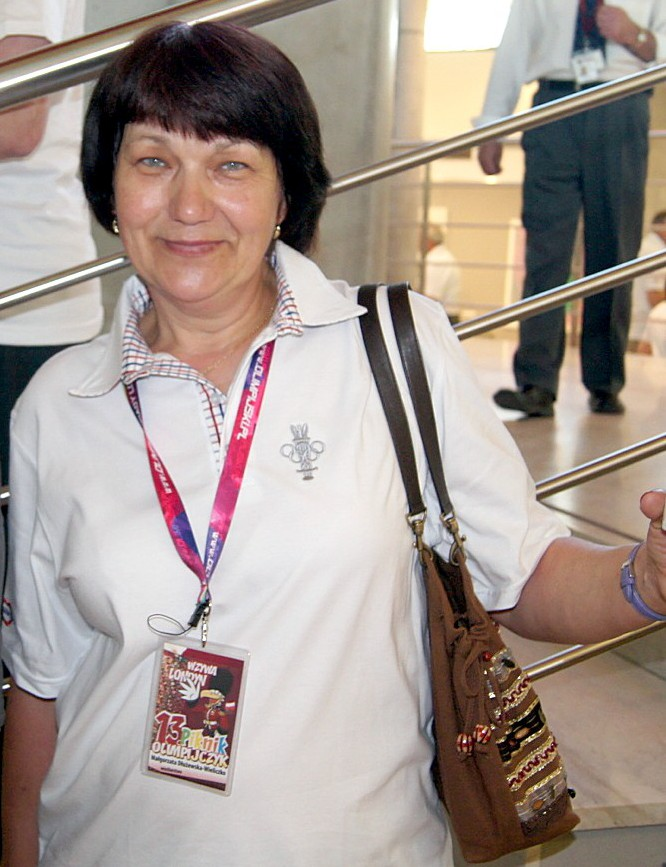
Małgorzata Dłużewska, polish Rower.

Małgorzata Dłużewska-Wieliczko (born 11 March 1951 in Koronowo) is a Polish rower.
