= Catherine Menges =

American rower

Catherine Zagunis
Personal information
- Born: September 9, 1952 (age 73) Pittsburgh, Pennsylvania, United States

Sport
- Sport: Rowing

Catherine Zagunis (née Menges; born September 9, 1952) is an American rower. She competed in the women's coxed four event at the 1976 Summer Olympics during the first appearance of the event in the Olympic Games.

== Personal life ==
Menges is the mother of Mariel Zagunis, the most decorated American fencer in history. Her two children, Merrick who is older than Mariel and Marten who is younger, are champion fencers. Her former husband, Robert Zagunis, was a fellow competitive rower who also competed in the 1976 Olympics in Montreal. The pair divorced in 2004.

== Fencing ==
Since 1998, Zagunis has been the director of programs at the Oregon Fencing Alliance. Zagunis managed the United States teams at the Junior and Senior World Championships in 1999, 2000, and 2001. She was the squad manager for the USA Fencing Women's Sabre Squad from 2005 to 2017. At The Oregon Fencing Alliance (OFA), she works closely with U.S. Women's Sabre Coach Ed Korfanty to develop marketing, create programs, and manage the fencing activities of OFA. Zagunis was asked to take over the leadership role by OFA founder Colleen Olney on a trip to the Junior Olympics when Olney knew that she was not going to be able to continue to run the program. At that point, Zagunis had been heavily involved in travel and support of OFA while Mariel and her two sons competed nationally.

Zagunis's support of her daughter Mariel to the top of the fencing world has led to her becoming an authority on parenting champions. She is an outspoken advocate for a measured approach to sports parenting that does not focus on achievement but instead on balance. Zagunis has attended all of Mariel's major competitions throughout her long career. Zagunis was consistently involved in her daughter's career through the Olympic Games in Rio.

Following the birth of Mariel's first child in 2017, Cathy's role shifted to helping care for her granddaughter while Mariel continued to pursue high level fencing.
