= Mark James (rower) =

New Zealand rower

Mark James is a retired New Zealand rower. He won medals with the men's eight at the 1978 (bronze) and 1979 World Rowing Championships (silver). James is now active as a rowing trainer.
