= Gisela Heisse =

German rower

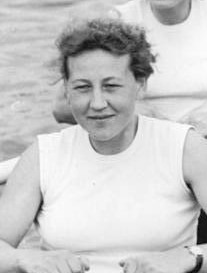
- Gisela Heisse in 1960

Sport
- Sport: Rowing
Medal record
Women's rowing
Representing East Germany
European Rowing Championships
Silver medal – second place	1959 Mâcon	Quad sculls
Gold medal – first place	1960 London	Quad sculls

Gisela Heisse is a retired German rower who won a silver and a gold medal in the quad sculls at the European championships of 1959–1960, both of them with Herta Weissig.
