= Vladimir Predbradzensky =

Soviet rower

Sport
- Sport: Rowing
Medal record
Men's rowing
Representing the Soviet Union
World Rowing Championships
Gold medal – first place	1978 Cambridge	Four

Vladimir Predbradzensky is a Soviet rower. He won a gold medal at the 1978 World Rowing Championships in Cambridge, New Zealand with the men's coxless four.
