= Renate Neu =

German rower

Sport
- Sport: Rowing
- Club: SG Dynamo Potsdam / Sportvereinigung (SV) Dynamo
Medal record
Women's rowing
Representing East Germany
World Rowing Championships
Gold medal – first place	1975 Nottingham	Eight
Silver medal – second place	1978 Cambridge	Eight
Silver medal – second place	1979 Bled	Eight

Renate Neu is a German rower who competed for the SG Dynamo Potsdam / Sportvereinigung (SV) Dynamo. She won the medals at the international rowing competitions.
