= Pam Behrens =

American rower

Personal information
- Nationality: American
- Born: September 22, 1946 (age 78); Camden, New Jersey, United States

Sport
- Sport: Rowing

Pam Behrens (born September 22, 1946) is an American rower. She competed in the women's coxed four event at the 1976 Summer Olympics.
