= Sabine Heß =

East German rowing cox

Personal information
- Born: 1 October 1958 (age 67) Dresden, East Germany
- Height: 150 cm (4 ft 11 in)
- Weight: 43 kg (95 lb)

Sport
- Sport: Rowing
- Club: SC Einheit Dresden
Medal record
Women's rowing
Representing East Germany
Olympic Games
Gold medal – first place	1976 Montreal	Coxed four
World Rowing Championships
Gold medal – first place	1977 Amsterdam	Eight

Sabine Heß (later Schubert, born 1 October 1958) is a German coxswain who competed for East Germany in the 1976 Summer Olympics.

She was born in Dresden. In 1976 she coxed the East German boat which won the gold medal in the coxed four event.
