= Joy Fera =

Canadian rower

Personal information
- Nationality: Canadian
- Born: 3 May 1950 (age 74); Vernon, British Columbia, Canada

Sport
- Sport: Rowing

Joy Fera (born 3 May 1950) is a Canadian rower. She competed in the women's coxed four event at the 1976 Summer Olympics.
