= Ginka Gyurova =

Bulgarian rower (born 1954)

Personal information
- Born: 15 April 1954 (age 72)

Sport
- Sport: Rowing
Medal record
Women's rowing
Representing Bulgaria
Olympic Games
Silver medal – second place	1976 Montreal	Coxed four
Silver medal – second place	1980 Moscow	Coxed four
World Championships
Silver medal – second place	1975 Nottingham	Coxed four

Ginka Gyurova (Bulgarian: Гинка Гюрова, born 15 April 1954) is a Bulgarian rower who competed in the 1976 Summer Olympics and in the 1980 Summer Olympics.

In 1976 she was a crew member of the Bulgarian boat which won the silver medal in the coxed fours event. Four years later she won her second silver medal with the Bulgarian boat in the 1980 coxed fours competition.
