= Lyudmila Krokhina =

Soviet/Russian rower

Olympic medal record

Women's rowing
| Bronze medal – third place | 1976 Montreal | Coxed four |

Lyudmila Vasilevna Krokhina (Russian: Людмила Васильевна Крохина; born 10 January 1954) is a Russian rower who competed for the Soviet Union in the 1976 Summer Olympics.

In 1976 she was a crew member of the Soviet boat which won the bronze medal in the coxed fours event.
