= Anna Pasokha =

Russian rower (born 1949)

Personal information
- Born: 1 February 1949 (age 77)

Sport
- Sport: Rowing
Medal record
Women's rowing
Representing the Soviet Union
Bronze medal – third place	1976 Montreal	Coxed four
European Rowing Championships
Gold medal – first place	1972 Brandenburg	Eight

Anna Borisovna Pasokha (Russian: Анна Борисовна Пасоха, born 1 February 1949) is a Russian rower who competed for the Soviet Union in the 1976 Summer Olympics.

In 1976 she was a crew member of the Soviet boat that won the bronze medal in the coxed four event.
