= Aneta Matei =

Romanian rower

Personal information
- Nationality: Romanian
- Born: 15 June 1948 (age 78) Timișoara, Romania

Sport
- Sport: Rowing
Medal record
Women's rowing
Representing Romania
World Championships
Bronze medal – third place	1974 Lucerne	Coxed four
Bronze medal – third place	1974 Lucerne	Eight
Bronze medal – third place	1975 Nottingham	Eight
Bronze medal – third place	1978 Karapiro	Coxed four
European Rowing Championships
Silver medal – second place	1972 Brandenburg	Eight
Bronze medal – third place	1973 Moscow	Eight

Aneta Matei (née Sieburg; born 15 June 1948) is a Romanian rowing cox. She competed at the 1976 Summer Olympics and the 1980 Summer Olympics.
