= Nadezhda Sevostyanova =

Soviet rower

Olympic medal record

Women's rowing
| Bronze medal – third place | 1976 Montreal | Coxed four |

Nadezhda Petrovna Sevostyanova (Russian: Надежда Петровна Севостьянова, born 2 September 1953) is a Russian rower who competed for the Soviet Union in the 1976 Summer Olympics.

In 1976 she was a crew member of the Soviet boat which won the bronze medal in the coxed fours event.
