= Gerd Sredzki =

East German rower

Personal information
- Spouse: Andrea Kurth

Sport
- Sport: Rowing
- Club: SC Berlin-Grünau
Medal record
Men's rowing
Representing East Germany
World Rowing Championships
Gold medal – first place	1977 Amsterdam	Eight
Gold medal – first place	1978 Cambridge	Eight

Gerd Sredzki is a rower who competed for East Germany. He was twice world champion in the eight event.

Sredzki, who started for SC Berlin-Grünau, came second in the GDR national championships in 1972. In 1973 and 1974, he came second at the nationals with a coxed four. In 1976, his eight made up entirely of SC Berlin-Grünau rowers, became national champion, however, the rowers chosen to represent East Germany at the Summer Olympics did not participate in those nationals. Sredzki, in a team made up from various clubs, became a 1977 national champion. That team went to the 1977 World Rowing Championships on the Bosbaan rowing lake in Amsterdam, Netherlands, where they became world champions. In February 1978, he was given two sports awards: Master of Sport and Honored Master of Sports.

Sredzki defended his national title in the eight in 1978. A composite team made up from the champion and vice-champion was sent to the 1978 World Rowing Championships on Lake Karapiro, New Zealand, where they defended their title.

In 1980, he married fellow rower Andrea Kurth from Dresden. In 1983, they had a son, Alexander Sredzki, who was junior and U23 world champion in 2001 (JM8+) and 2005 (BM4+), respectively. Gerd Sredzki is self-employed as a DJ.
