= Andreas Ebert =

East German rower

Sport
- Sport: Rowing
- Club: ASK Vorwärts Rostock
Medal record
Men's rowing
Representing East Germany
World Rowing Championships
| Gold medal – first place | 1978 Cambridge | Eight |

Andreas Ebert is a rower who competed for East Germany. He was world champion in the eight event in 1978.

Ebert, who started for ASK Vorwärts Rostock, came third in the GDR national championships in 1972 with the coxed four. In 1975, he was part of a composite eight that came second in the nationals. In 1976, his coxed four made up entirely of ASK Vorwärts Rostock rowers, became national champion, however, the rowers chosen to represent East Germany at the Summer Olympics did not participate in those nationals. With the eight, he came second that year. Ebert won the national title in the eight in 1978. A composite team made up from the champion and vice-champion was sent to the 1978 World Rowing Championships on Lake Karapiro, New Zealand, where the team defended their title.
