= Ute Steindorf =

German rower (born 1957)

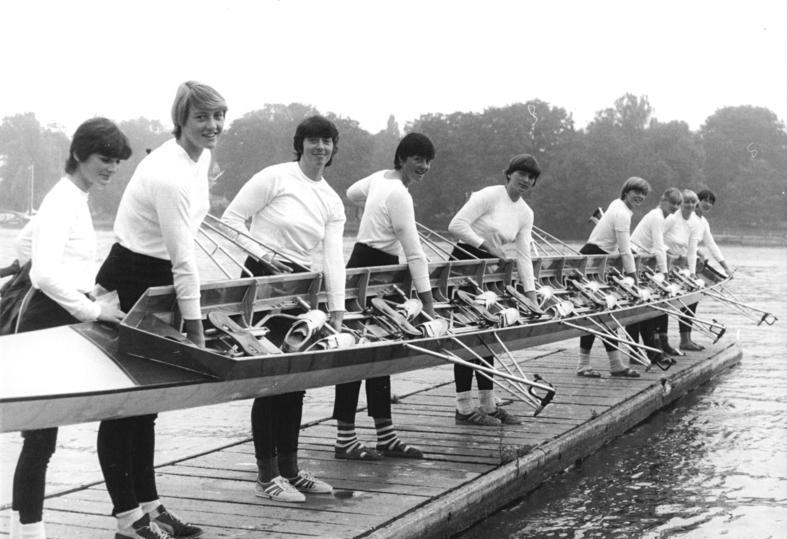
- 1982 from the left: Kirsten Wenzel (coxswain), Claudia Noack, Ute Steindorf, Sabine Portius, Carola Miseler, Steffi Götzelt, Sigrid Anders, Iris Rudolph, and Karin Metze

Medal record

Women's rowing

Representing East Germany

Olympic Games
Gold medal – first place	1980 Moscow	Coxless pair

World Rowing Championships
Gold medal – first place	1977 Amsterdam	Eight
Gold medal – first place	1979 Bled	Coxless pair

Ute Steindorf (born 26 August 1957) is a German rower who competed for East Germany. She was born in Wolfen.
