= Kapka Georgieva =

Bulgarian rower (born 1951)

Kapka Georgieva Капка Георгиева
Personal information
- Nationality: Bulgarian
- Born: 30 September 1951 (age 74)

Sport
- Country: Bulgaria
- Sport: rowing
- Event: coxed fours
Medal record
Representing Bulgaria
Women's rowing
Silver medal – second place	1976 Montreal	Coxed four

Kapka Georgieva (later Panayotova, Bulgarian: Капка Георгиева, later Панайотова, born 30 September 1951) is a Bulgarian rower who competed in the 1976 Summer Olympics.

In 1976 she was the coxswain of the Bulgarian boat which won the silver medal in the coxed fours event.
