= Andrea Kurth =

East German rower

Andrea Sredzki
Personal information
- Born: Andrea Kurth; 30 September 1957 (age 68) Breitenbrunn, East Germany
- Height: 178 cm (5 ft 10 in)
- Weight: 77 kg (170 lb)
- Spouse: Gerd Sredzki

Sport
- Sport: Rowing
- Club: SC Einheit Dresden
Medal record
Women's rowing
Representing East Germany
Olympic Games
Gold medal – first place	1976 Montreal	Coxed four
World Rowing Championships
Gold medal – first place	1977 Amsterdam	Eight

Andrea Kurth (later Schippan then Sredzki, born 30 September 1957) is a German rower who competed for East Germany in the 1976 Summer Olympics.

She was born in Breitenbrunn in 1957 and she started for SC Einheit Dresden. In 1976 she was a crew member of the East German boat which won the gold medal in the coxed four event.

After the 1976 Olympics, the coxed four was absorbed into an eight. Kurth became national champion with that new team and the team went on to become world champion at the 1977 World Rowing Championships on the Bosbaan in the Netherlands. She was the stroke for the eight and later said that the 1977 world championship meant more to her than her Olympic victory. She remained active after 1977 but suffered a setback due to her trainer, Richard Wecke, fleeing to West Germany while they were in Amsterdam. She was also suffering injury problems. She prepared herself for the 1980 Olympics but finished her career when she needed a hand operation.

In an August 1977 interview, she stated that she was engaged. At the 1978 East German championships, she competed as Andrea Schippan and came third with the women's eight and second with the coxed four.

In 1980, she married Gerd Sredzki, a double-world champion with the men's eight, and moved to Berlin where her husband was based. In 1983, they had a son, Alexander Sredzki, who was junior and U23 world champion in 2001 (JM8+) and 2005 (BM4+), respectively. Andrea Sredzki works for the mail order company Otto.
