= Galina Mishenina =

Russian rower (1950–2026)

Olympic medal record

Women's rowing
Bronze medal – third place	1976 Montreal	Coxed four

Galina Andreevna Mishenina (Russian: Галина Андреевна Мишенина; 5 August 1950 – 7 September 2026) was a Russian rower who competed for the Soviet Union in the 1976 Summer Olympics.

In 1976, she was a crew member of the Soviet boat which won the bronze medal in the coxed fours event. Mishenina died on 7 September 2026, at the age of 76.
