= Quintin Boat Club =

British rowing club

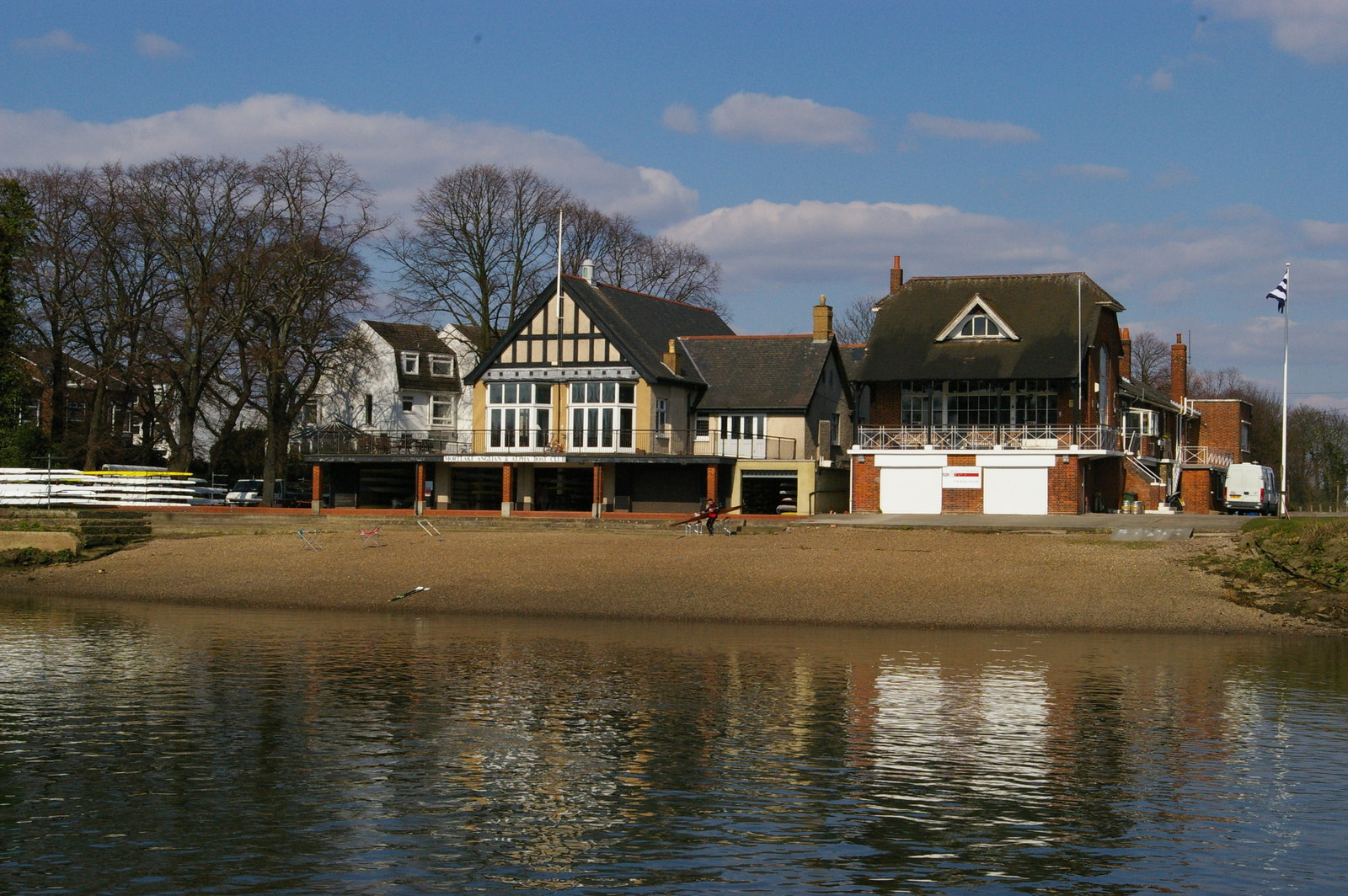

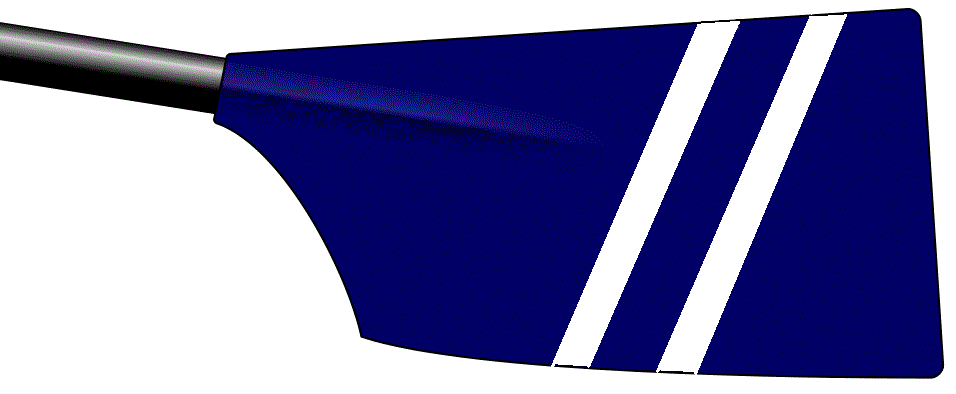
- Location: Chiswick, London, England
- Coordinates: 51°28′30″N 0°16′14″W
- Home water: Tideway, River Thames
- Founded: 1907 (1888)
- Affiliations: British Rowing boat code - QBC
- Website: quintinboatclub.org

Events
- Chiswick Regatta, Quintin Head

Notable members
- William L. Barry

Quintin Boat Club (QBC) is a rowing club based at the University of Westminster Boathouse on the River Thames, close to Chiswick Bridge in Chiswick, West London. Formally constituted in 1907, it evolved out of the Regent Street Polytechnic’s rowing club which was started in 1879. In 1888, the polytechnic's founder, Quintin Hogg, paid to have a boathouse built for it at Chiswick and also paid for a fleet of boats.

The club's first appearance at Henley was in 1920 and they participated at the first Head of the River Race in 1926.

Women were first admitted as members in 1999, and by 2009 formed about a quarter of the membership.

== Membership ==
As a main centre for mature rowing and sculling which consists of multiple Masters categories, the club has had successes at Henley Masters' Regatta, the National Masters Championships ('National Masters') and the World Masters Regatta.

In recent years the club's men squad has had success at various multi lane regattas, Henley Royal Regatta, and consistently finishing top 10 in various 8's head races.

The women's squad also has had a strong presence at local regattas, winning various categories from novice to Elite.

== Honours ==
=== Henley Royal Regatta ===
Year	Races won
1947	Double Sculls Challenge Cup, Wyfold Challenge Cup
1965	Stewards' Challenge Cup
1974	Thames Challenge Cup

=== British champions ===
Year	Winning crew/s
1973	Men 8+
1975	Men 4x composite
1976	Men 1x
1977	Men 4x composite
1984	Men 4x
1990	Men J16 2x

== See also ==
- Rowing on the River Thames
- University of Westminster
- Quintin Hogg (merchant)
