= Cornelia Klier =

German rower

Medal record

Women's rowing

Representing East Germany

Olympic Games
Gold medal – first place	1980 Moscow	Coxless pair

World Rowing Championships
Gold medal – first place	1977 Amsterdam	Eight (W8+)
Gold medal – first place	1978 Karapiro	Coxless pair (W2-)
Gold medal – first place	1979 Bled	Coxless pair (W2-)

Cornelia Klier (née Bügel; born 19 March 1957 in Leutenberg) is a German rower. She married in 1980 prior to attending the Olympic Games and used her married name in Moscow.
