= Matthias Schumann =

East German rower

Sport
- Sport: Rowing
- Club: SC Dynamo Berlin
Medal record
Men's rowing
Representing East Germany
World Rowing Championships
Gold medal – first place	1978 Cambridge	Eight

Matthias Schumann is a rower who competed for East Germany. He was world champion in the eight event in 1978.

In 1977, Schumann came third in the GDR national championships in a team made of rowers from SC Dynamo Berlin. Schumann won the national title in the eight in 1978. A composite team made up from the champion and vice-champion was sent to the 1978 World Rowing Championships on Lake Karapiro, New Zealand, where the team defended their title.

At the 1979 national championships, Schumann came third in the eight in a team made solely from his club. The team had the same result at the 1980 championships. Also in 1980, Schumann started with Heiko Schulz in the coxless pair and they took out the national championship title; however, the Olympic rowing team did not participate in the national championships that year. In 1981, Schumann and Schulz managed to defend their national title. They came fourth at the 1981 World Rowing Championships in coxless pair.
