= Bianka Schwede =

German rower (born 1953)

Personal information
- Born: 9 January 1953 (age 73) Dresden, East Germany
- Height: 174 cm (5 ft 9 in)
- Weight: 79 kg (174 lb)

Sport
- Sport: Rowing
- Club: SC Einheit Dresden
Medal record
Women's rowing
Representing East Germany
Olympic Games
Gold medal – first place	1976 Montreal	Coxed four
World Rowing Championships
Gold medal – first place	1974 Lucerne	Eight
Gold medal – first place	1975 Nottingham	Eight
Gold medal – first place	1977 Amsterdam	Eight

Bianka Schwede (later Borrmann, born 9 January 1953) is a German rower who competed for East Germany in the 1976 Summer Olympics.

She was born in Dresden. In 1976 she was a crew member of the East German boat that won the gold medal in the coxed four event. Under her married name, she travelled as a reserve to the 1978 World Rowing Championships in New Zealand but did not compete.
