= Lilyana Vaseva =

Bulgarian rower

Olympic medal record

Women's rowing
Silver medal – second place	1976 Montreal	Coxed four

Lilyana Vaseva (Bulgarian: Лиляна Васева, born 12 August 1955) is a Bulgarian rower who competed in the 1976 Summer Olympics.

In 1976 she was a crew member of the Bulgarian boat which won the silver medal in the coxed fours event.
