= Ans Gravesteijn =

Dutch rower

Personal information
- Nationality: Dutch
- Born: 3 January 1951 (age 74); Gouda, Netherlands

Sport
- Sport: Rowing

Ans Gravesteijn (born 3 January 1951) is a Dutch rower. She competed in the women's coxed four event at the 1976 Summer Olympics.
