= Florica Petcu-Dospinescu =

Romanian rower (born 1951)

Personal information
- Nationality: Romanian
- Born: 11 March 1951 (age 75) Bolovani, Romania

Sport
- Sport: Rowing
Medal record
Women's rowing
Representing Romania
World Championships
Bronze medal – third place	1974 Lucerne	Eight
Bronze medal – third place	1975 Nottingham	Eight
Bronze medal – third place	1978 Karapiro	Coxed four
Silver medal – second place	1979 Bled	Coxless pair
European Rowing Championships
Silver medal – second place	1972 Brandenburg	Eight
Bronze medal – third place	1971 Copenhagen	Eight
Bronze medal – third place	1973 Moscow	Eight

Florica Petcu-Dospinescu (born 11 March 1951) is a Romanian rower. She competed at the 1976 Summer Olympics and the 1980 Summer Olympics.
