= Dolores Young =

Canadian rower

Personal information
- Full name: Dolores Robina Mary Young
- Born: 2 May 1957 (age 68) Picton, Ontario, Canada

Sport
- Sport: Rowing

Dolores Robina Mary Young (born 2 May 1957) is a Canadian rower. She competed at the 1976 Summer Olympics and the 1984 Summer Olympics. In 1976, her team finished in 7th place in the Coxed Four women's event, and her team in 1984 finished 7th in the Coxed Quadruple Sculls women's event. Her competition in the 1976 games earned her a spot on the Canadian Rowing Hall of Fame in 2019.
