= Lidiya Krylova =

Soviet rower

Olympic medal record

Women's rowing
Bronze medal – third place	1976 Montreal	Coxed four

Lidiya Evgenevna Krylova (Russian: Лидия Евгеньевна Крылова, born 12 March 1951) is a Russian rower who competed for the Soviet Union in the 1976 Summer Olympics.

In 1976 she was the coxswain of the Soviet boat which won the bronze medal in the coxed fours event.
