= Nancy Storrs =

American rower (1950–2023)

Personal information
- Nationality: American
- Born: March 24, 1950; Huntington, New York, U.S.
- Died: September 8, 2023 (aged 73); St. Catharines, Ontario, Canada

Sport
- Sport: Rowing

Nancy Storrs (March 24, 1950 – September 8, 2023) was an American rower. She competed in the women's coxed four event at the 1976 Summer Olympics, the first Olympics to include women's rowing, as well as being named to the boycotted 1980 Olympic Team. Storrs died in St. Catharines, Ontario, on September 8, 2023, at the age of 73.

Nancy found her lifelong passion for rowing while a student at Williams College.
