= Bernd Höing =

East German rower

Olympic medal record

Representing East Germany

Rowing at the Summer Olympics
Gold medal – first place	1980 Moscow	Eight

World Rowing Championships
Gold medal – first place	1978 Hamilton	Eight
Gold medal – first place	1979 Bled	Eight
Silver medal – second place	1982 Luzern	Eight
Silver medal – second place	1983 Duisburg	Eight

Bernd Höing (born 4 March 1955) is a German rower, who competed for the SC Dynamo Berlin / Sportvereinigung (SV) Dynamo. He won the medals at the international rowing competitions.
