= Gabriele Kühn =

East German rower

Personal information
- Born: 11 March 1957 (age 69) Dresden, East Germany
- Height: 184 cm (6 ft 0 in)
- Weight: 86 kg (190 lb)
- Relatives: Peter Cipollone (stepson)

Sport
- Sport: Rowing
- Club: SC Einheit Dresden
Medal record
Women's rowing
Representing East Germany
Olympic Games
Gold medal – first place	1976 Montreal	Coxed four
Gold medal – first place	1980 Moscow	Eight
World Rowing Championships
Gold medal – first place	1977 Amsterdam	Eight

Gabriele "Gabi" Kühn (née Lohs, born 11 March 1957) is a German rower who competed for East Germany in the 1976 Summer Olympics and the 1980 Summer Olympics.

She was born in Dresden. In 1976, she was a crew member of the East German boat, which won the gold medal in the coxed four event. Four years later, she won her second gold medal with the East German boat in the eight competition.

She married after the 1977 rowing season. She is the stepmother of the American coxswain Peter Cipollone.
