= Myriam van Rooyen-Steenman =

Dutch rower (born 1950)

Personal information
- Born: Maria Hendrika Leonarda Steenman; 17 April 1950 (age 76) Amsterdam, the Netherlands
- Height: 1.78 m (5 ft 10 in)
- Weight: 72 kg (159 lb)

Sport
- Sport: Rowing
- Club: Nereus, Amsterdam
Medal record
Representing the Netherlands
World Rowing Championships
Silver medal – second place	1974 Lucerne	Coxed four
European Rowing Championships
Bronze medal – third place	1972 Brandenburg	Coxed four
Gold medal – first place	1973 Moscow	Coxed four

Maria Hendrika Leonarda "Myriam" van Rooyen-Steenman (née Steenman, born 17 April 1950) is a retired Dutch rower. She competed at the pre1972 Summer Olympics and the 1976 Summer Olympics in the coxed fours and finished in respectively first and in fifth place. She won a European title in this event in 1973, won a silver medal at the 1974 World Championships and finished fifth at the 1975 World Championships.

Until 1975 she competed under her maiden name Steenman, and since 1976 as van Rooijen-Steenman.
