= Gillian Webb =

British rower

Personal information
- Nationality: British
- Born: 12 January 1956 (age 69)

Sport
- Sport: Rowing
- Club: Stuart Ladies RC / Lea RC

Gillian Webb married name Gillian Parker (born 12 January 1956) is a retired British rower, who competed in the Olympic Games.

== Rowing career ==
In July 1975 Webb won three gold medals in the coxless pair with Lin Clark, rowing for a Civil Service and Stuart Ladies composite, the coxed fours and quadruple sculls, at the 1975 National Rowing Championships. The following month she was part of the coxed four crew that finished in ninth place at the 1975 World Rowing Championships.

She competed in the women's coxed four event at the 1976 Summer Olympics, finishing in eighth place. In 1979 she competed in her second World Championships, rowing in the coxed fours again, finishing in tenth place. Also in 1979 she was part of the composite crew that won the coxed fours at the National Championships.
