= Monique Pronk =

Dutch rower

Personal information
- Full name: Monica Maria Pronk
- Born: 4 August 1958 (age 67) Amsterdam, the Netherlands
- Height: 1.58 m (5 ft 2 in)
- Weight: 45 kg (99 lb)

Sport
- Sport: Rowing
- Club: RIC, Amsterdam

Monica Maria "Monique" Pronk (born 4 August 1958) is a retired Dutch rowing coxswain. She competed at the 1976 and 1980 Olympics in the coxed fours and quad sculls and finished in fifth and sixth place, respectively.
