= Marita Sandig =

German rower (born 1958)

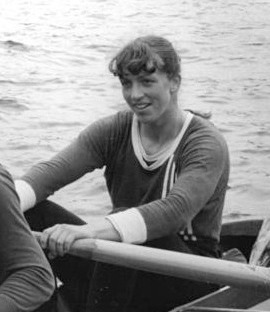
- Sandig in 1984

Personal information
- Born: 4 April 1958 (age 68) Lichtenstein, Bezirk Karl-Marx-Stadt, East Germany
- Height: 175 cm (5 ft 9 in)
- Weight: 68 kg (150 lb)

Sport
- Sport: Rowing
- Club: SC DHfK, Leipzig
Medal record
Women's rowing
Representing East Germany
Olympic Games
Gold medal – first place	1980 Moscow	Eight
World Rowing Championships
Gold medal – first place	1977 Amsterdam	Eight
Gold medal – first place	1978 Karapiro	Coxed four
Gold medal – first place	1982 Lucerne	Coxless pair
Gold medal – first place	1983 Duisburg	Coxless pair
Silver medal – second place	1979 Bled	Coxed four
Silver medal – second place	1981 Munich	Coxed four

Marita Sandig (later Gasch, born 4 April 1958) is a German rower who won a gold medal in the eights at the 1980 Summer Olympics. She won four world championships from 1977 to 1983, three with Silvia Fröhlich, and came in second twice. She was married to Uwe Gasch, another retired Olympian rower.
