= Kirsten Wenzel =

German rowing cox (born 1961)

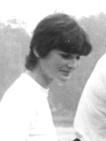
- Wenzel in 1982

Personal information
- Born: 27 February 1961 (age 65) Leipzig, East Germany
- Height: 150 cm (4 ft 11 in)
- Weight: 48 kg (106 lb)
- Spouse: Rainer Strohbach (div)

Sport
- Sport: Rowing
- Club: SC DHfK, Leipzig
Medal record
Women's rowing
Representing East Germany
Olympic Games
Gold medal – first place	1980 Moscow	Coxed four
World Rowing Championships
Gold medal – first place	1978 Karapiro	Coxed four
Silver medal – second place	1979 Bled	Coxed four
Silver medal – second place	1981 Munich	Coxed four
Bronze medal – third place	1982 Lucerne	Eight
Bronze medal – third place	1983 Duisburg	Eight

Kirsten Wenzel (later Strohbach, born 27 February 1961) is a rowing cox who represented East Germany.

== Rowing career ==
Wenzel was born in 1961 in Leipzig. She started for SC DHfK Leipzig and won gold at the 1975 Spartakiad in the coxed quad scull. At the 1978 World Rowing Championships on Lake Karapiro in New Zealand, she became world champion with the coxed four team. In the same boat class but with different rowers, she won silver at the 1979 World Rowing Championships at Bled, Yugoslavia.

At the 1980 Summer Olympics in Moscow, Wenzel won gold with the coxed four. At the 1981 World Rowing Championships in Munich, she won silver with the coxed four. At the 1982 World Rowing Championships on the Rotsee in Switzerland she coxed the women's eight to bronze. She competed at the 1983 World Rowing Championships under her married name Strohbach and won a final bronze medal with the women's eight before she retired.

== Private life ==
On 18 December 1982, Wenzel married Olympic swimmer Rainer Strohbach at the town hall of Pankow. She studied to become a teacher and taught at high schools in Berlin. She later divorced Strohbach.
