= List of Latvian sportspeople =

This is a list of notable Latvian sportspeople.

== Athletics ==
- Jānis Bojārs
- Māris Bružiks
- Adalberts Bubenko
- Jānis Daliņš
- Aigars Fadejevs
- Laura Ikauniece
- Inese Jaunzeme
- Igors Kazanovs
- Inta Kļimoviča
- Ainārs Kovals
- Dainis Kūla
- Jānis Lūsis
- Staņislavs Olijars
- Elvīra Ozoliņa
- Jeļena Prokopčuka
- Ineta Radēviča
- Juris Silovs
- Māris Urtāns
- Vadims Vasiļevskis

== Basketball ==
- Elīna Babkina
- Ainars Bagatskis
- Andris Biedriņš
- Tamāra Dauniene
- Zane Jākobsone
- Rūdolfs Jurciņš
- Kaspars Kambala
- Alfrēds Krauklis
- Igors Miglinieks
- Jānis Lidmanis
- Uljana Semjonova
- Aleksandrs Vanags
- Valdis Valters
- Gundars Vētra
- Kristaps Porziņģis

== Beach Volleyball ==
- Mārtiņš Pļaviņš
- Aleksandrs Samoilovs
- Jānis Šmēdiņš

== Biathlon ==
- Ilmārs Bricis
- Oļegs Maļuhins
- Andrejs Rastorgujevs

== Bobsleigh ==
- Intars Dambis
- Daumants Dreiškens
- Jānis Ķipurs
- Oskars Melbārdis
- Jānis Miņins
- Guntis Osis
- Jānis Strenga
- Arvis Vilkaste

== Canoeing ==
- Ivans Klementjevs

== Cycling ==
- Dainis Ozols
- Māris Štrombergs

== Fencing ==
- Bruno Habārovs

== Figure skating ==
- Elena Berezhnaya
- Oleg Shliakhov

== Gymnastics ==
- Natalia Lashchenova
- Jevgēņijs Saproņenko
- Igors Vihrovs

== Ice hockey ==
- Helmuts Balderis
- Oskars Bārtulis
- Zemgus Girgensons
- Viktors Hatuļevs
- Sandis Ozoliņš
- Vitali Samoilov
- Kārlis Skrastiņš

== Judo ==
- Ārons Bogoļubovs
- Jevgeņijs Borodavko
- Aleksandrs Jackēvičs
- Deniss Kozlovs
- Konstantīns Ovčiņņikovs
- Vsevolods Zeļonijs

== Luge ==
- Ingrīda Amantova
- Zigmars Berkolds
- Sandris Bērziņš
- Dainis Bremze
- Inārs Kivlenieks
- Aigars Kriķis
- Anna Orlova
- Guntis Rēķis
- Mārtiņš Rubenis
- Elīza Tīruma
- Maija Tīruma
- Andris Šics
- Juris Šics
- Vera Zozulya

== Modern Pentathlon ==
- Deniss Čerkovskis
- Jeļena Rubļevska

== Rowing ==
- Juris Bērziņš
- Artūrs Garonskis
- Maya Kaufmane
- Dimants Krišjānis
- Dzintars Krišjānis
- Aivars Lazdenieks
- Daina Schweiz
- Sarmīte Stone
- Žoržs Tikmers

== Shooting ==
- Haralds Blaus
- Afanasijs Kuzmins

== Short track speed skating ==
- Haralds Silovs

== Skeleton ==
- Martins Dukurs
- Tomass Dukurs

== Speed skating ==
- Alfons Bērziņš
- Haralds Silovs
- Lāsma Kauniste

== Swimming ==
- Georgi Kulikov
- Arsens Miskarovs

== Tennis ==
- Jeļena Ostapenko
- Līga Dekmeijere
- Ernests Gulbis
- Zaiga Jansone
- Larisa Neiland
- Anastasija Sevastova

== Volleyball ==
- Oļegs Antropovs
- Astra Biltauere
- Ivans Bugajenkovs
- Staņislavs Lugailo
- Pāvels Seļivanovs
- Tatyana Veinberga
- Raimonds Vilde

== Weightlifting ==
- Vasilijs Stepanovs
- Viktors Ščerbatihs

== Wrestling ==
- Jānis Beinarovičs
- Edvīns Bietags
- Anastasija Grigorjeva

== See also ==
- Latvia at the Olympics
- Sport in Latvia
