= Rowing at the 1980 Summer Olympics – Men's coxed four =

Men's coxed four at the Games of the XXII Olympiad
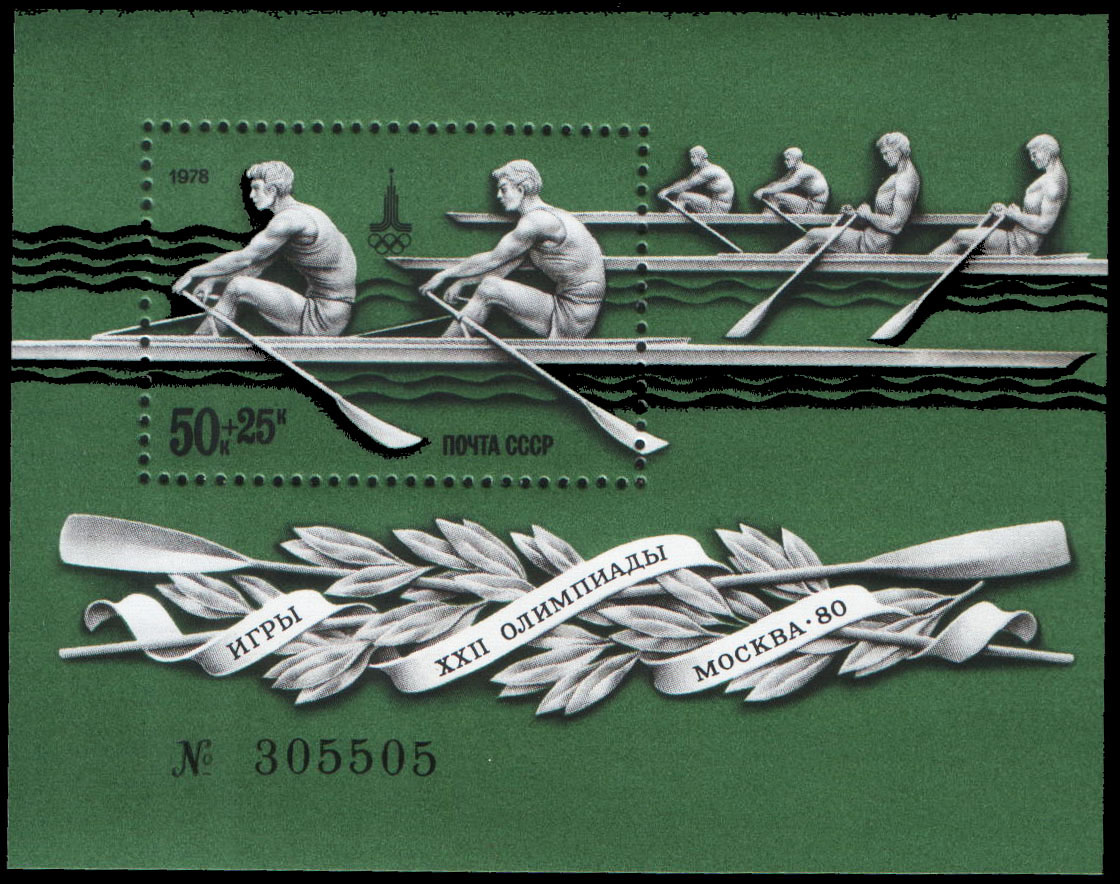
- Soviet stamp commemorating rowing at the 1980 Summer Olympics
- Venue: Krylatskoye Rowing Canal
- Dates: 20–27 July 1980
- Competitors: 60 from 12 nations
- Winning time: 6:14.51

Medalists
1st place, gold medalist(s)		East Germany: Dieter Wendisch; Walter Dießner; Ullrich Dießner; Gottfried Döhn; Andreas Gregor
2nd place, silver medalist(s)		Soviet Union: Artūrs Garonskis; Dimants Krišjānis; Dzintars Krišjānis; Žoržs Tikmers; Juris Bērziņš
3rd place, bronze medalist(s)		Poland: Grzegorz Stellak; Adam Tomasiak; Grzegorz Nowak; Ryszard Stadniuk; Ryszard Kubiak

The men's coxed four rowing competition at the 1980 Summer Olympics took place at Krylatskoye Sports Complex Canoeing and Rowing Basin, Moscow, Soviet Union. The event was held from 20 to 27 July. There were 12 boats (60 competitors) from 12 nations, with each nation limited to a single boat in the event. The event was won by East Germany, the nation's first victory after three consecutive silver medals since it began competing separately in 1968. Defending champions the Soviet Union finished second, while Poland's bronze medal was the first medal in the men's coxed four for that nation since 1932. Twin brothers Ullrich and Walter Dießner became the sixth and seventh men to earn two medals in the event, as they had also competed on the 1976 East German silver medal team.

== Background ==
This was the 16th appearance of the event. Rowing had been on the programme in 1896 but was cancelled due to bad weather. The coxed four was one of the four initial events introduced in 1900. It was not held in 1904 or 1908, but was held at every Games from 1912 to 1992 when it (along with the men's coxed pair) was replaced with the men's lightweight double sculls and men's lightweight coxless four.

The three nations on the podium at the 1979 World Rowing Championships had been the strongest nations in the event for most of the 1970s; they would have been favoured to reach the podium again at the 1980 Games but did not compete due to a boycott. West Germany were medalists at the 1976 Olympics and 1974, 1975, 1977, 1978, and 1979 World Championships but without a victory since the 1972 Olympics. This left defending Olympic champions the Soviet Union (silver in 1979 Worlds) and three-time Olympic runners-up (and three-time reigning World Champions) East Germany as the two favourites.

No nations made their debut in the event. Switzerland made its ninth appearance, most among nations competing in 1980 though behind the absent United States (13 appearances), Italy (12), and France (11).

== Competition format ==
The coxed four event featured five-person boats, with four rowers and a coxswain. It was a sweep rowing event, with the rowers each having one oar (and thus each rowing on one side). The competition used the 2000 metres distance that became standard at the 1912 Olympics and which has been used ever since except at the 1948 Games.

With only 12 boats, the event shrank from a four-round competition in prior Games to a three-round tournament in 1980.

- Semifinals: Two heats of 6 boats each. The top boat in each heat (2 total) advanced directly to Final A. The remaining boats (10 total) went to the repechage.
- Repechage: Two heats of 5 boats each. The top two boats in each heat (4 total) rejoined the semifinal winners in Final A. The other boats (6 total) went to Final B.
- Final: Two finals. Final A consisted of the top 6 boats. Final B placed boats 7 through 12.

== Schedule ==
All times are Moscow Time (UTC+3)

Date	Time	Round
Sunday, 20 July 1980	10:00	Semifinals
Tuesday, 22 July 1980	10:00	Repechage
Sunday, 27 July 1980	10:00	Finals

== Results ==
=== Semifinals ===
Winner of each heat advanced to Final A. The remaining teams must compete in repechage for the remaining spots in Final A.

==== Semifinal 1 ====
Rank	Rowers	Coxswain	Nation	Time	Notes
1	Dieter Wendisch; Walter Dießner; Ullrich Dießner; Gottfried Döhn	Andreas Gregor	East Germany	6:44.49	QA
2	Grzegorz Stellak; Adam Tomasiak; Grzegorz Nowak; Ryszard Stadniuk	Ryszard Kubiak	Poland	6:47.61	R
3	Artūrs Garonskis; Dimants Krišjānis; Dzintars Krišjānis; Žoržs Tikmers	Juris Bērziņš	Soviet Union	6:50.29	R
4	Khristo Aleksandrov; Vilkhelm Germanov; Georgi Petkov; Stoyan Stoyanov	Nenko Dobrev	Bulgaria	6:53.37	R
5	Laildo Machado; Wandir Kuntze; Walter Soares; Henrique Johann	Manuel Mandel	Brazil	6:59.98	R
6	Pavel Konvička; Martin Hladík; Jan Kabrhel; Milan Suchopár	Antonín Barák	Czechoslovakia	7:06.38	R

==== Semifinal 2 ====
Rank	Rowers	Coxswain	Nation	Time	Notes
1	José Manuel Bermúdez; Isidro Martín; Salvador Verges; Luis Lasúrtegui	Javier Sabriá	Spain	6:43.35	QA
2	Lenny Robertson; Gordon Rankine; Colin Seymour; John Roberts	Alan Inns	Great Britain	6:52.57	R
3	Daniel Homberger; Peter Rahn; Roland Stocker; Peter Stocker	Karl Graf	Switzerland	6:53.66	R
4	Iain Kennedy; Pat McDonagh; Ted Ryan; Davey Gray	Noel Graham	Ireland	7:00.28	R
5	Milan Ćulibrk; Vladimir Krstić; Božidar Đorđević; Dušan Kovačević	Saša Mimić	Yugoslavia	7:00.58	R
6	Francisco Mora; Juan Bueno; Juan Alfonso; Antonio Riaño	Enrique Carrillo	Cuba	7:11.11	R

=== Repechage ===
The top two teams in each repechage heat qualified for Final A. The remainder went to Final B (out of medal contention).

==== Repechage heat 1 ====
Rank	Rowers	Coxswain	Nation	Time	Notes
1	Grzegorz Stellak; Adam Tomasiak; Grzegorz Nowak; Ryszard Stadniuk	Ryszard Kubiak	Poland	6:32.28	QA
2	Daniel Homberger; Peter Rahn; Roland Stocker; Peter Stocker	Karl Graf	Switzerland	6:35.29	QA
3	Laildo Machado; Wandir Kuntze; Walter Soares; Henrique Johann	Manuel Mandel	Brazil	6:37.07	QB
4	Pavel Konvička; Martin Hladík; Jan Kabrhel; Milan Suchopár	Antonín Barák	Czechoslovakia	6:43.81	QB
5	Iain Kennedy; Pat McDonagh; Ted Ryan; Davey Gray	Noel Graham	Ireland	6:56.78	QB

==== Repechage heat 2 ====
Rank	Rowers	Coxswain	Nation	Time	Notes
1	Artūrs Garonskis; Dimants Krišjānis; Dzintars Krišjānis; Žoržs Tikmers	Juris Bērziņš	Soviet Union	6:28.14	QA
2	Khristo Aleksandrov; Vilkhelm Germanov; Georgi Petkov; Stoyan Stoyanov	Nenko Dobrev	Bulgaria	6:31.46	QA
3	Lenny Robertson; Gordon Rankine; Colin Seymour; John Roberts	Alan Inns	Great Britain	6:33.25	QB
4	Milan Ćulibrk; Vladimir Krstić; Božidar Đorđević; Dušan Kovačević	Saša Mimić	Yugoslavia	6:43.94	QB
5	Francisco Mora; Juan Bueno; Juan Alfonso; Antonio Riaño	Enrique Carrillo	Cuba	6:54.32	QB

=== Finals ===
==== Final B ====
Rank	Rowers	Coxswain	Nation	Time
7	Lenny Robertson; Gordon Rankine; Colin Seymour; John Roberts	Alan Inns	Great Britain	6:27.11
8	Laildo Machado; Wandir Kuntze; Walter Soares; Henrique Johann	Manuel Mandel	Brazil	6:33.29
9	Pavel Konvička; Martin Hladík; Jan Kabrhel; Milan Suchopár	Antonín Barák	Czechoslovakia	6:35.27
10	Milan Ćulibrk; Vladimir Krstić; Božidar Đorđević; Dušan Kovačević	Saša Mimić	Yugoslavia	6:37.15
11	Iain Kennedy; Pat McDonagh; Ted Ryan; Davey Gray	Noel Graham	Ireland	6:44.76
12	Francisco Mora; Juan Bueno; Juan Alfonso; Antonio Riaño	Enrique Carrillo	Cuba	6:53.37

==== Final A ====
Rank	Rowers	Coxswain	Nation	Time
1st place, gold medalist(s)	Dieter Wendisch; Walter Dießner; Ullrich Dießner; Gottfried Döhn	Andreas Gregor	East Germany	6:14.51
2nd place, silver medalist(s)	Artūrs Garonskis; Dimants Krišjānis; Dzintars Krišjānis; Žoržs Tikmers	Juris Bērziņš	Soviet Union	6:19.05
3rd place, bronze medalist(s)	Grzegorz Stellak; Adam Tomasiak; Grzegorz Nowak; Ryszard Stadniuk	Ryszard Kubiak	Poland	6:22.52
4	José Manuel Bermúdez; Isidro Martín; Salvador Verges; Luis Lasúrtegui	Javier Sabriá	Spain	6:26.23
5	Khristo Aleksandrov; Vilkhelm Germanov; Georgi Petkov; Stoyan Stoyanov	Nenko Dobrev	Bulgaria	6:28.13
6	Daniel Homberger; Peter Rahn; Roland Stocker; Peter Stocker	Karl Graf	Switzerland	6:30.26

== Sources ==
- Fizkultura i Sport, ed. (1981). The Official Report of the Games of the XXII Olympiad Moscow 1980 Volume Three (PDF). p. 111.
