= Sport in Latvia =

Sport in Latvia includes basketball, football, ice hockey, athletics (track), rugby, tennis, cycling, and others. Ice hockey is the most popular of the Latvian sports and is closely followed by basketball. Some of Latvia's most notable athletes include hockey player Sandis Ozoliņš, football player Māris Verpakovskis, Olympic javelin thrower Jānis Lūsis, two-time Olympic BMX champion Maris Strombergs, and basketball player Kristaps Porziņģis. The national sport of Latvia is ice hockey.

== Ice hockey ==
Ice hockey is the most popular sport in Latvia. Its professional league is the Latvian Hockey Higher League, held since 1931. In Latvia there are also several amateur hockey leagues. Ice hockey has been played in Latvia since the 1920s. Latvia is a member of the International Ice Hockey Federation (IIHF), and its national team participated in several World Championships and the 1936 Winter Olympic Games. After Latvia was occupied by the Soviet Union in 1940, its membership in the IIHF was interrupted. Latvians had a significant role in establishing ice hockey in the Soviet Union. Latvia's Dinamo Rīga team was one of eleven teams which played in the first Soviet championship tournament in the winter of 1946/1947. The Latvian Harijs Mellups was the goaltender for the Soviet Union National team in its first international game in 1948.

Latvian hockey experienced a decline in the 1960s, with Dinamo Rīga being relegated from the Soviet High League (vysshaya liga) to the first league and then to the second league. It began a comeback in the 1970s under the coach Viktor Tikhonov, who later coached CSKA Moscow and the Soviet national team. In the 1973/1974 season, Dinamo Rīga returned to the Elite League, where it stayed until the end of the Soviet Union in 1991.

In 1975, Viktor Hatulev of Dinamo Rīga became the first ice hockey player from the Soviet Union drafted by the National Hockey League (NHL), but he never had a chance to play, as Soviet players were not allowed to play for foreign teams. Helmuts Balderis was the most prominent Latvian hockey player of the 1970s and 1980s, and set all-time scoring records for Latvian forwards (scoring 333 goals in Soviet championships). He was the leading scorer in the Soviet Elite League twice (1977 and 1983) and the Player of the Year once (1977). Balderis also played for the Soviet National team, being on the losing side of the Miracle on Ice game in 1980 but winning the World Championships on other occasions (1978, 1979 and 1983). Balderis was named the best forward of the 1977 Ice Hockey World Championship. Despite his continuing high scoring results, he was not selected for the Soviet National team for the 1984 Winter Olympics, possibly for political or national reasons (in those years the Soviet team consisted only of players from Moscow ice hockey teams, and other Soviet cities and republics were not represented). Thus Balderis became the all-time top scorer among those Soviet ice hockey forwards who played for the national team but were never awarded an Olympic gold medal. Goaltenders Vitālijs Samoilovs and Artūrs Irbe also played for the Soviet team in the 1980s; Irbe was named the best goaltender of the 1990 Ice Hockey World Championship. Samoilovs was the backup goaltender on the gold medal-winning Soviet team at the 1988 Winter Olympic Games.

The best season for Dinamo Rīga came in 1987/1988, the first season when the Soviet Elite League instituted an NHL-style playoff system. Dinamo Rīga finished third in the regular season and upset Dynamo Moscow in the semi-finals, before losing to CSKA Moscow, the perennial Soviet champions of the 1980s, in the finals.

After Latvia regained independence in 1991, it restored its membership in the IIHF and the Latvian national team returned to international competitions. As a new team, it was initially placed in the C Pool (third division) of the World Championships and had to qualify for the higher level competitions. It debuted in the B Pool in 1994 and the top-level A Pool in 1997, and has played in the A Pool championship since then. Its best results were three 7th-place finishes in 1997, 2004 and 2009, until it won its first medal as host of the 2023 tournament, where Latvia finished 3rd. The Latvian team has defeated several top teams at World Championships, including the USA three times (in 1998, 2001, and 2023), Sweden in 2023, and Russia twice (in 2000 and 2003). Latvia competed in the 2002 Winter Olympics, the 2006 Winter Olympics and the 2010 Winter Olympics.

As of 2019, twenty four Latvian ice hockey players had played in the NHL. The first of them was Helmuts Balderis, who joined the Minnesota North Stars at the age of 36 in the 1989–90 season. Sandis Ozoliņš, Artūrs Irbe, Sergejs Žoltoks and Kārlis Skrastiņš are among the most successful. Ozoliņš is the only Latvian to win the Stanley Cup, in the 1995–96 season with the Colorado Avalanche. Ozoliņš and Irbe played in NHL All-Star Games. Other Latvian players who have played in the NHL include Aleksandrs Kerčs, Grigorijs Panteļejevs, Pēteris Skudra, Viktors Ignatjevs, Herberts Vasiļjevs, Kaspars Astašenko, Raitis Ivanāns, Jānis Sprukts, Harijs Vītoliņš, Mārtiņš Karsums, Oskars Bārtulis, Artūrs Kulda, Kaspars Daugaviņš, Zemgus Girgensons, Kristers Gudļevskis, Ronalds Ķēniņš, Rūdolfs Balcers, Teodors Bļugers and Elvis Merzļikins.

The 2006 Men's World Ice Hockey Championships was held in Latvia.

The Latvia men's national team won its first medal at the 2023 Men's World Ice Hockey Championships, which Latvia co- hosted, defeating the United States 4-3 in overtime to win the bronze. The following day was declared a national holiday, with 50,000 fans attending the team's welcome rally in Riga.

== Basketball ==
In Latvia, basketball is the second most popular sport. Latvia has a long basketballing tradition. Latvia won the first European championship in 1935 and hosted the second championship in 1937.

In the Soviet period, the Latvian men's basketball team Rīgas ASK was dominant in the Soviet League in the 1950s and early 1960s, winning several Soviet league championships and three European Champion's Cups, in 1958, 1959 and 1960. In the 1960 Summer Olympics, four Latvians, Jānis Krūmiņš, Valdis Muižnieks, Cēzars Ozers and Maigonis Valdmanis, were part of the silver medal-winning Soviet team. The Soviet Olympic teams in 1956 and 1964 Summer Olympics had three Latvian players each. The Soviet team in 1952 Summer Olympics had one Latvian.

The women's team TTT Riga was successful in the 1970s and 1980s, winning the European Champion's Cup 18 times, more than any other team in any team sport. The 2.12 m (7 ft) tall Uljana Semjonova was the team's key player in this period. With the Soviet team, she never lost a game in international competitions, winning 2 Olympic and 3 World Championships.

For men's basketball, the guard Valdis Valters was the most highly acclaimed player of the 1980s. He won a European Championship with the Soviet team in 1981 and was recognized as the most valuable player of the tournament, but did not play at the Olympics because of the Soviet boycott of the 1984 Summer Olympics in Los Angeles, which coincided with Valters's best playing years. Another Latvian, Igors Miglinieks, won gold with the Soviet team four years later, at the 1988 Summer Olympics.

Latvia returned to international competition as an independent country in 1992. The qualifiers of the 1992 Summer Olympics were the first tournament for Latvia's team. A major controversy was caused by two Latvian players, Igors Miglinieks and Gundars Vētra. They had a choice of either playing for the Unified Team which was certain to qualify for the Olympics or the Latvian national team which had a chance but was not certain to qualify. The two players chose to play for the Unified Team. The Latvian team, playing without them, failed to qualify for Olympics. This caused a great deal of resentment in Latvia and the two players never played for Latvia in an international game.

After the country regained independence, the most successful tournament for Latvia was the 2001 European Championships, where the Latvian team finished in 8th place. The centre/power forward Kaspars Kambala was Latvia's best player in this tournament. Latvia's national championship, Latvijas Basketbola Līga, was dominated by the Brocēni team in the 1990s and the Ventspils team in the 2000s. In 2006, Ventspils won its seventh consecutive championship.

Gundars Vētra became the first Latvian in the NBA when he played 13 games for the Minnesota Timberwolves in 1993. Andris Biedriņš was drafted in the 2004 NBA draft with the 11th pick by the Golden State Warriors, becoming the second Latvian to play in the NBA. He was the youngest player in the 2004-05 NBA season. In the 2015 NBA draft, the New York Knicks selected Kristaps Porziņģis, at the time playing for Spanish club Baloncesto Sevilla, with the fourth selection.

At EuroBasket Women 2007, the national women's basketball team reached the semi-finals, the best result of a Latvian national basketball team since independence from the Soviet Union, where it faced Russia. Affected by injuries, most notably to key players Gunta Baško and Anete Jēkabsone-Žogota, Latvia lost and finished 4th after losing to Belarus. Latvia co-hosted Women's EuroBasket 2019 with Serbia. In 2022, the men's national team qualified for the FIBA Basketball World Cup for the first time.

== Athletics ==
Latvian athletes have won medals at the Olympics and at European and World Championships. Ainārs Kovals won a silver medal in the men's Javelin throw at the 2008 Olympics in Beijing. Staņislavs Olijars won a silver medal in 2002 and a gold medal at the 2006 European Athletics Championships in the 110 m hurdles. Jeļena Prokopčuka won the New York City Marathon in 2005 and 2006.

During the Soviet period, Latvia produced many successful javelin throwers. Javelin thrower Inese Jaunzeme became the first Latvian to win at the Olympic Games, doing so at the 1956 Olympics. At the 1960 Summer Olympics, another javelin thrower, Elvīra Ozoliņa, won the gold medal. Latvian javelin thrower Jānis Lūsis won at the 1968 Summer Olympics and was also a 4 time European champion. Lūsis set two world records in the javelin throw: 91.68 m in 1968 and 93.80 m in 1972. In 1987, the IAAF named him the greatest javelin thrower of all time. Another javelin thrower, Dainis Kūla, won the gold medal at the 1980 Olympics.

== Tennis ==
Since 2006, tennis has become a popular sport in Latvia because of Ernests Gulbis's achievements. He reached the 4th round of the 2007 U.S. Open, having beaten world No. 8 Tommy Robredo in the 3rd round. In 2008 he lost in the quarter-finals of the French Open to world No. 3 Novak Djokovic. Gulbis reached a ranking of No.10 in June 2014.

Another successful tennis player was Ukrainian-born Larisa Neiland, one of the top female doubles players from the late 1980s until the early 1990s. Partnering Natasha Zvereva, she won two Grand Slam doubles tournaments (1989 French Open and 1991 Wimbledon). In singles, her best results were quarterfinals at the 1994 Wimbledon and the 1988 U.S. Open. Her best position in the WTA singles ranking was 58th, which she reached in 1996, while at the beginning of 1992 she was ranked 1st in doubles.

The Latvian team has participated in the Davis Cup since 1993, when it won promotion to Group II of the Europe/Africa zone. In 2000 Latvia was relegated to Group III. The following year Latvia returned to Group II, but was relegated again in 2002. Latvia returned to Group II the next year. In 2007 Latvia defeated the Monaco team and was promoted to Group I for 2008, where it was defeated by the Republic of Macedonia. Besides Gulbis, the team included Andis Juška, Deniss Pavlovs and Karlis Lejnieks.

In 2017, Jeļena Ostapenko became the first Latvian to win a Grand Slam title when she won the women's singles title at the 2017 French Open . In March 2018 she reached a career- high singles ranking of no. 5, and she has a career- high doubles ranking of no. 32 in the Women's Tennis Association (WTA).

Another WTA player is Anastasija Sevastova, who reached a career- high ranking of no. 15 in 2017, reached the US Open quarterfinals three times, advancing to the semifinal once, and has won three WTA titles.

In the Fed Cup, the Latvian team reached World Group II status in 2018, defeating Russia en route.

== Association football ==
Association football was the most popular sport in Latvia during the first period of independence (1918–1940).

The Latvian national team participated in the final stage of the 2004 European Football Championship. The leading scorer for the Latvian national football team is Māris Verpakovskis. A sports marketing study conducted by the international company Mediacom concluded that football was Latvia's most popular sport for three consecutive years. The annual study considers 65 sports activities in Latvia, measuring their popularity by active and passive participation, media coverage and event attendance.

== Cycling ==
Also Latvian cyclists are famous in the world arena, lately in BMX. First time in Europe cycling history one country Latvian BMX Elite Riders (Artūrs Matisons, Ivo Lakučs, Māris Štrombergs Artis Zentiņš) triumphed on European Championships 2006. Māris Štrombergs was the 2008 and 2010 UCI BMX World champion and a double gold medalist at the Beijing 2008 Summer Olympics and London 2012.

Latvian rider Romāns Vainšteins won the elite men's road race at the 2000 UCI Road World Championships.

== Motorsport ==
Rally is considered to be the second most popular sport in Latvia. The Rally Liepāja–Ventspils became a round of the European Rally Championship in 2013.

The Speedway Grand Prix of Latvia was first held as a round of the Speedway Grand Prix in 2006.

In rallycross, Reinis Nitišs was European Rallycross Champion in the Super 1600 class in 2013 and went on to become the youngest winner of a round of the FIA World Rallycross Championship when he won the 2014 World RX of Norway at the age of 18. Nitišs later became the first driver from the Baltic states to become European Champion in the highest division of rallycross. Jānis Baumanis won the European Super 1600 championship in 2015 and has also raced in the top flight.

Latvia has also had two open-wheel drivers - Haralds Šlēgelmilhs who competed in Formula Two in 2012, and Karlīne Štāla who competed in German Formula Three in 2008.

== Other sports ==
Many other sports and recreational activities are also popular in Latvia.

- Orienteering is a popular sport that combines cross-country running with land navigation skills in the woods. Orienteering in Latvia is organized by the Latvijas Orientēšanās Federācija.
- Amateur Radio Direction Finding is a sport that combines the skills of orienteering with the skills of radio direction finding. ARDF in Latvia is organized by the Latvijas Radioamatieru Līga.
- Martins Dukurs is currently the top male skeleton athlete in the world, having won all but one of the FIBT World Cup events in 2011-2012 and is the three-time defending World Cup champion.
- Oskars Melbārdis won the combined Bobsleigh World Cup as a driver in the 2012–13 season, after initially entering the sport as a brakeman for Jānis Miņins.
- Lugers Juris and Andris Šics won a silver at the 2010 Winter Olympics and two bronze medals at the 2014 Winter Olympics. The Šics brothers' three medals mean they have won more Olympic medals than any other Latvian sportsperson.
- Latvia national bandy team played in Division A both at the 2015 Bandy World Championship and the 2016 tournament. In terms of licensed athletes, bandy is the second biggest winter sport in the world.
- For the first time, Latvia will feature a national team at the 2022 Under-19 World Lacrosse Championships.
- Latvia featured a men's national team in beach volleyball that competed at the 2018–2020 CEV Beach Volleyball Continental Cup.
- Futsal is Latvia's new sport as it will co-host the UEFA Futsal Euro 2026 alongside Lithuania.
- Bowling is enjoyed by many in Latvia as seen by the number of bowling alleys throughout the country. For two-handed bowling, Latvian Daniel Vezis won second place at the 6th International Wroclaw Open tournament in 2012. Additionally, Vezis represented Latvia at numerous events and multiple weekly tournaments.
- In Boxing - Mairis Briedis is the first and only Latvian to date, to win a boxing world title, having held the WBC cruiserweight title from 2017 to 2018, the WBO cruiserweight title in 2019, and the IBF / The Ring magazine cruiserweight titles in 2020.

== Gallery ==
Gallery of notable Latvian sportspeople

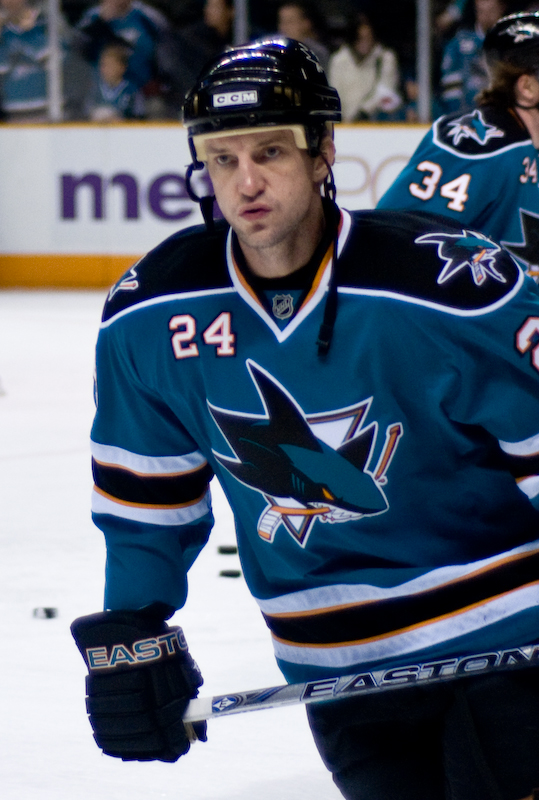
Sandis Ozoliņš

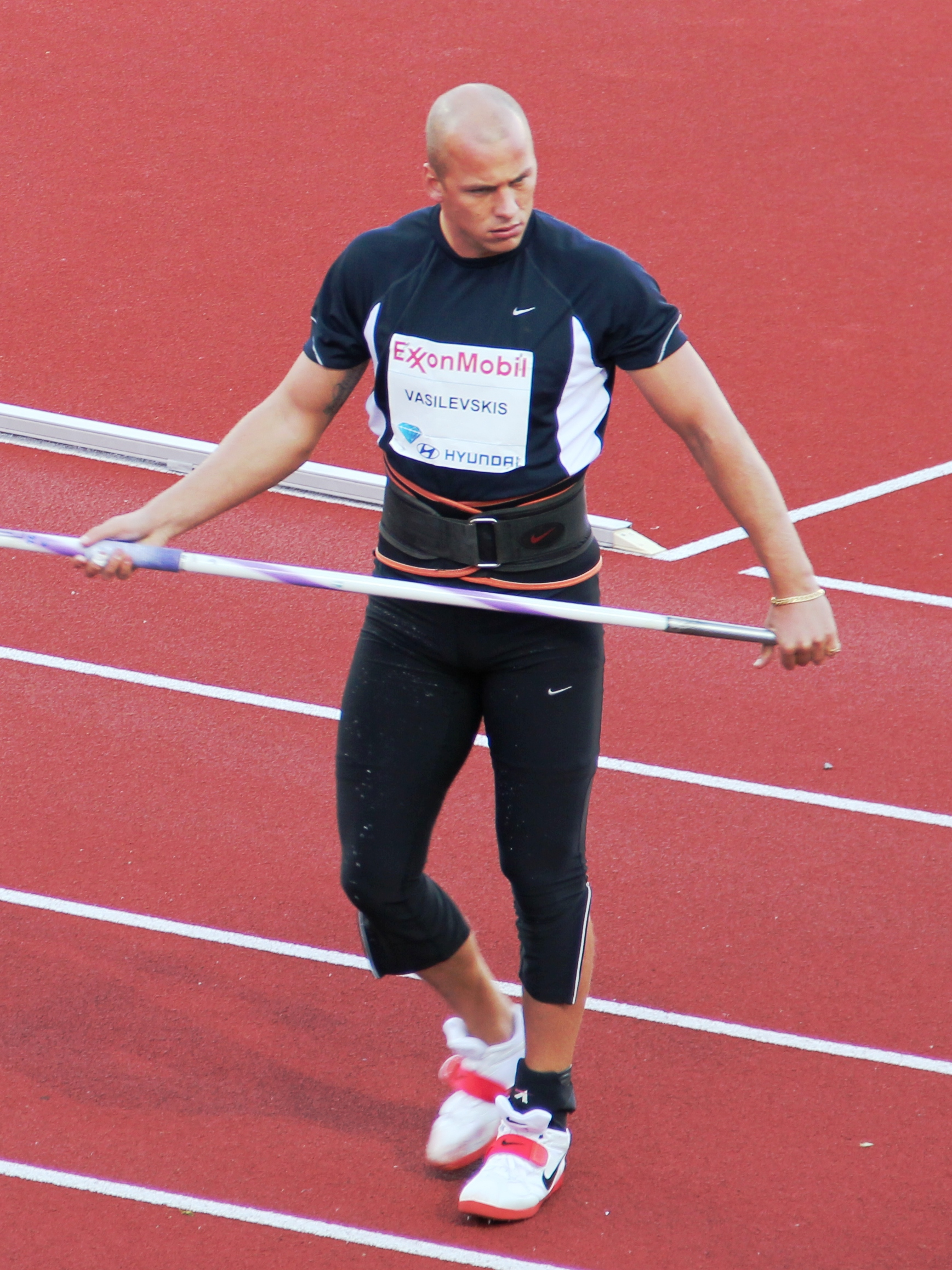
Vadims Vasiļevskis

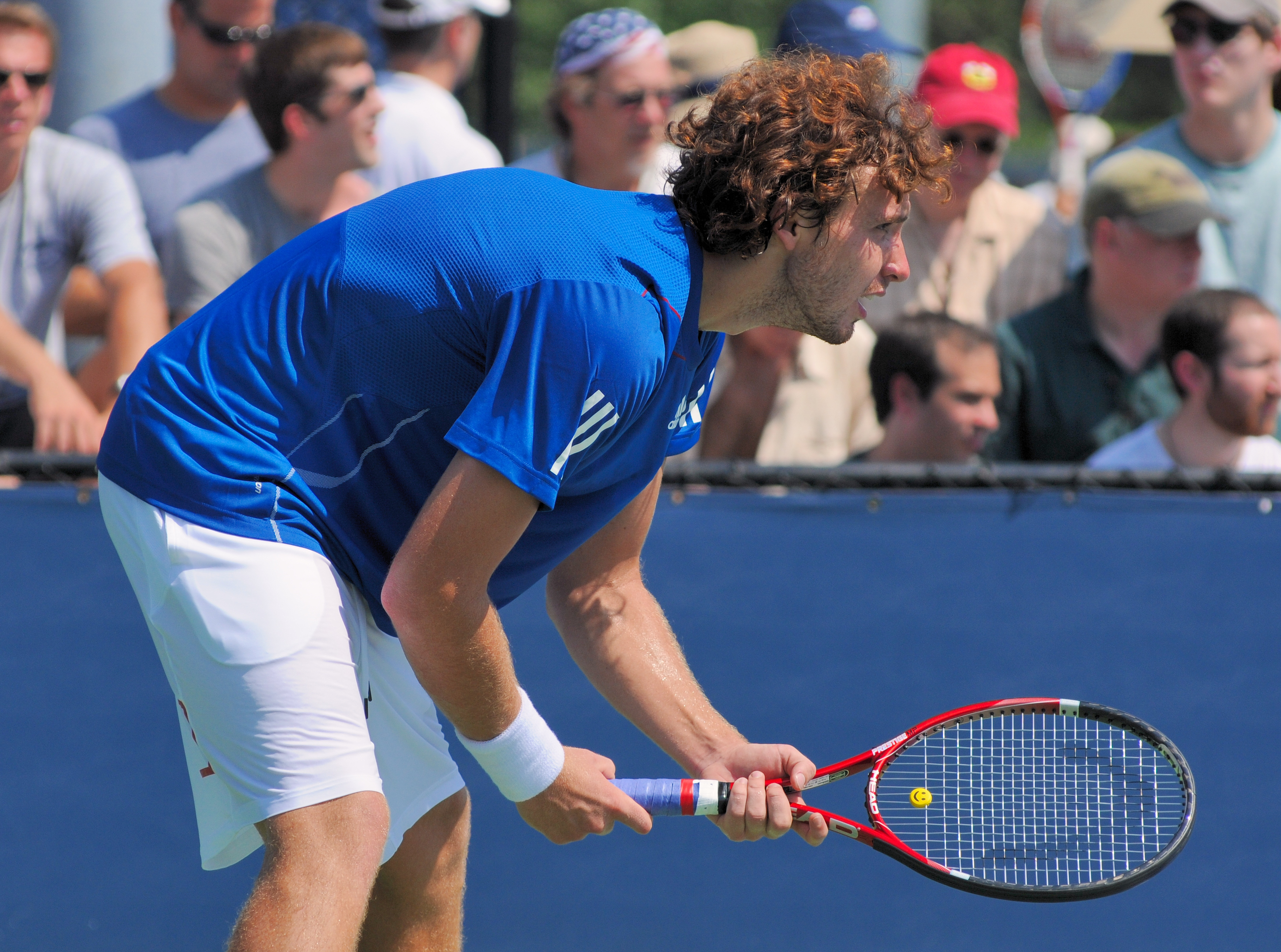
Ernests Gulbis

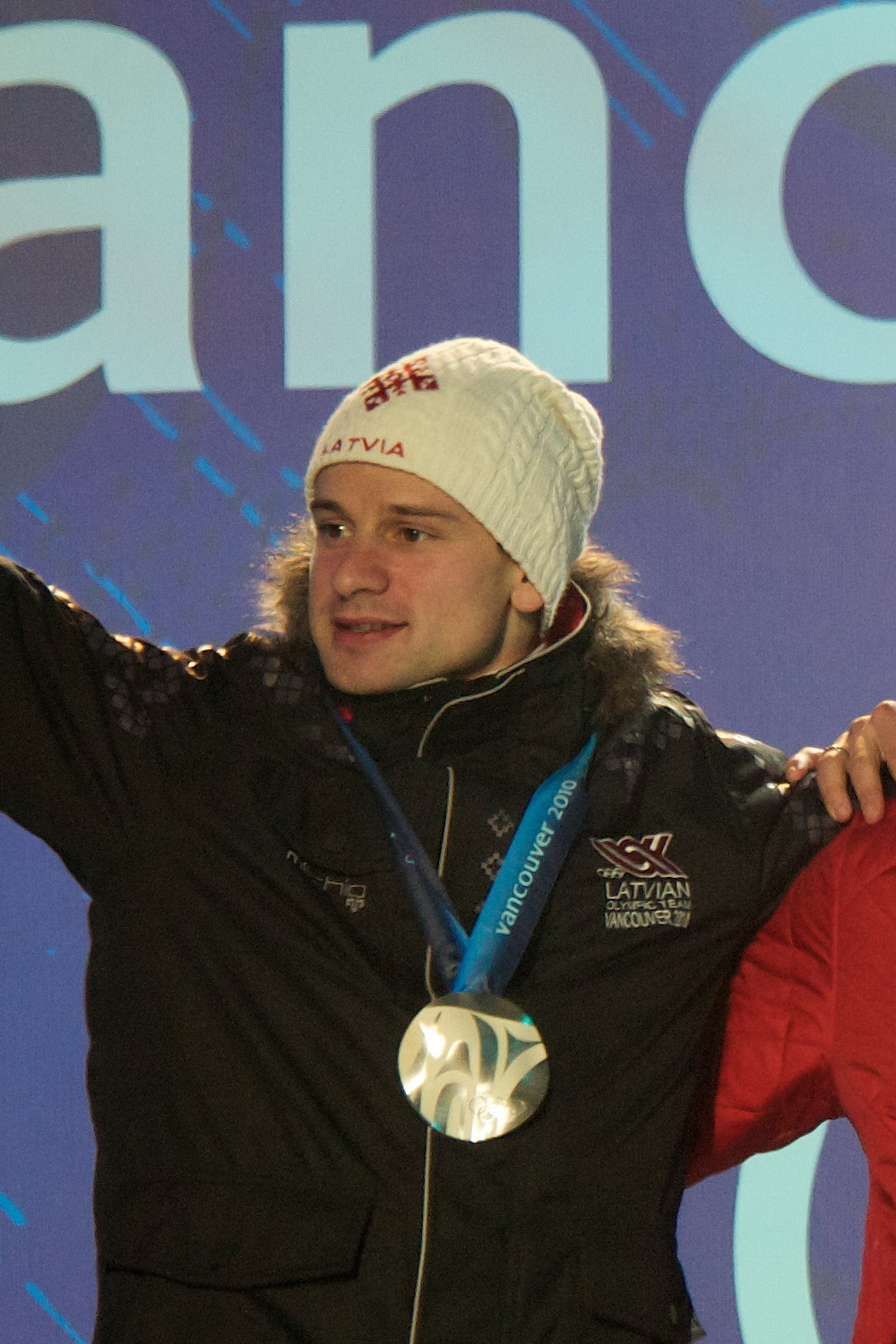
Martins Dukurs

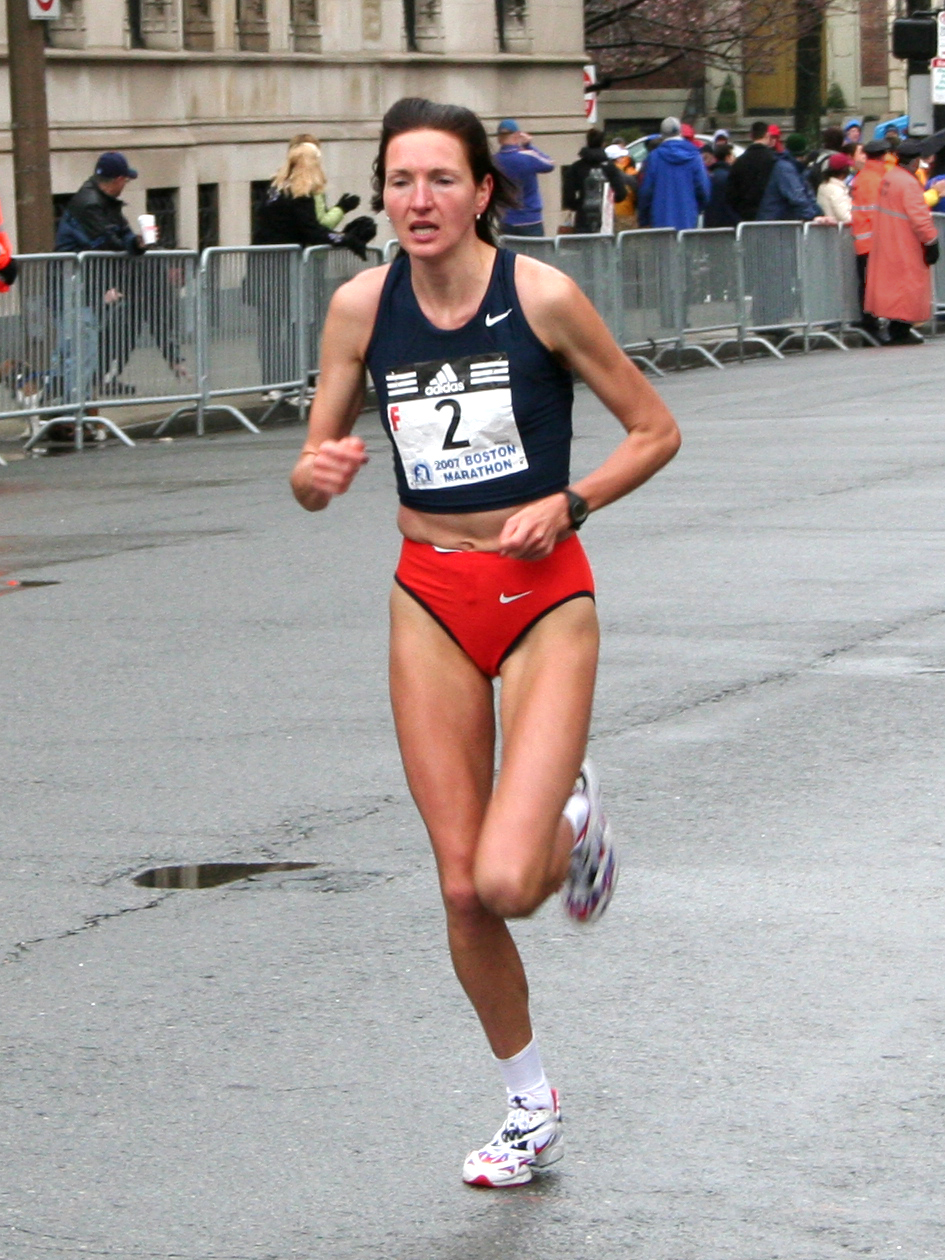
Jeļena Prokopčuka

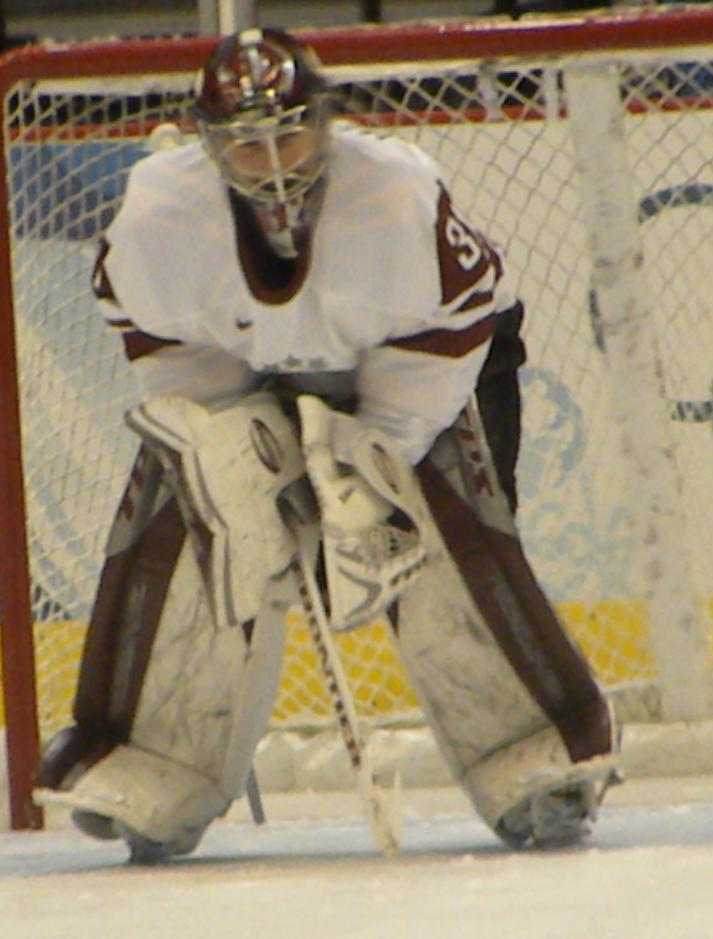
Edgars Masaļskis

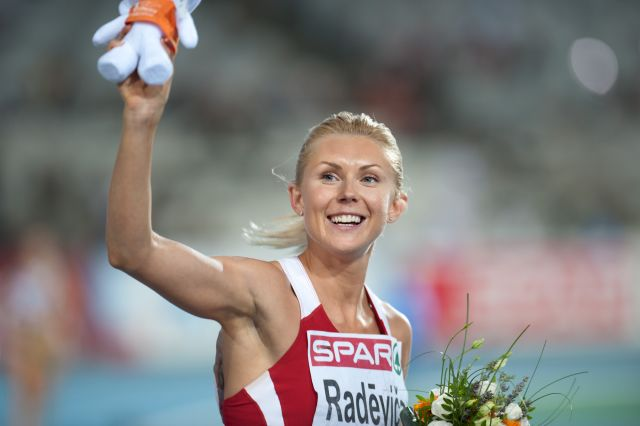
Ineta Radēviča

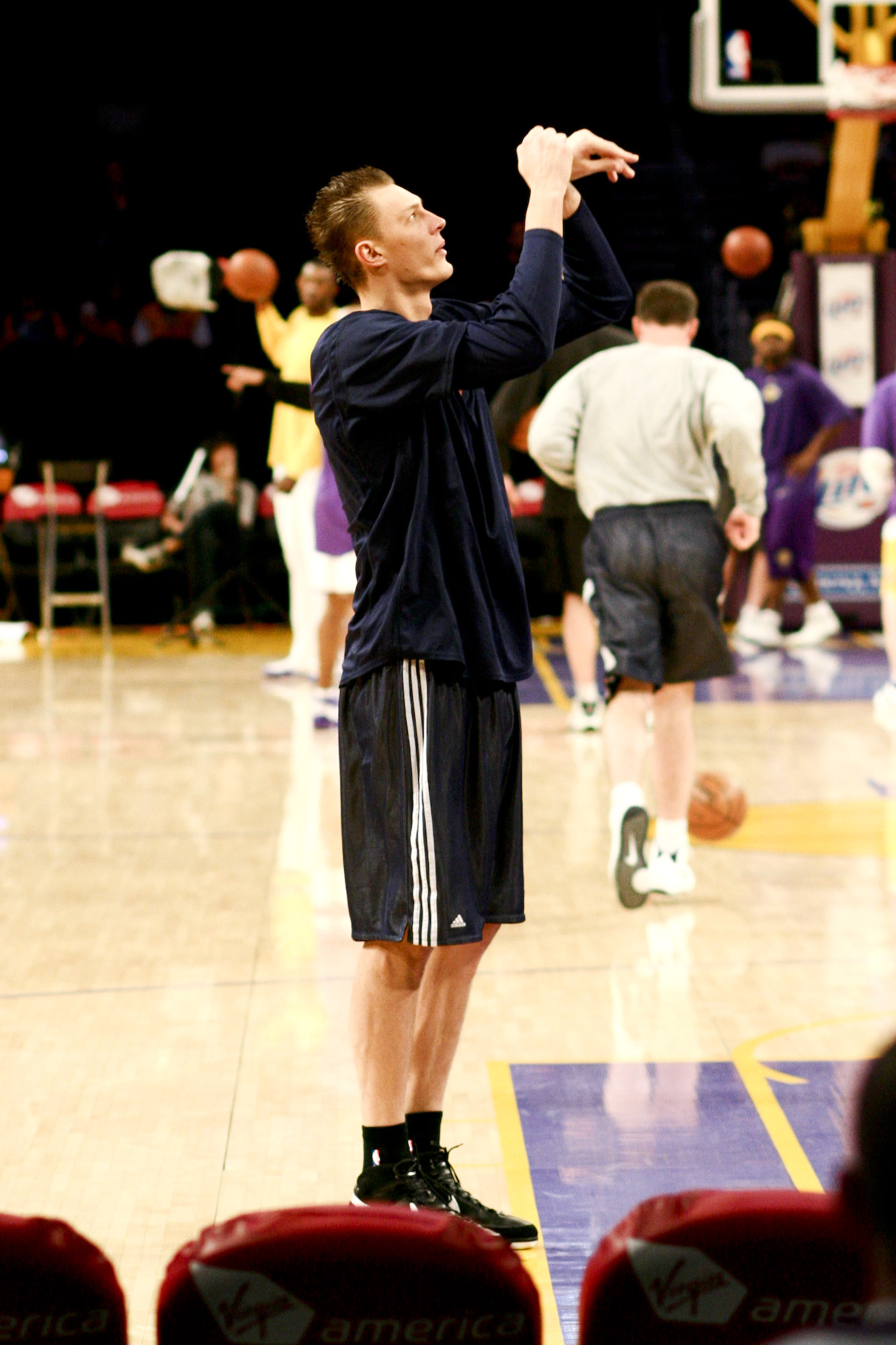
Andris Biedriņš

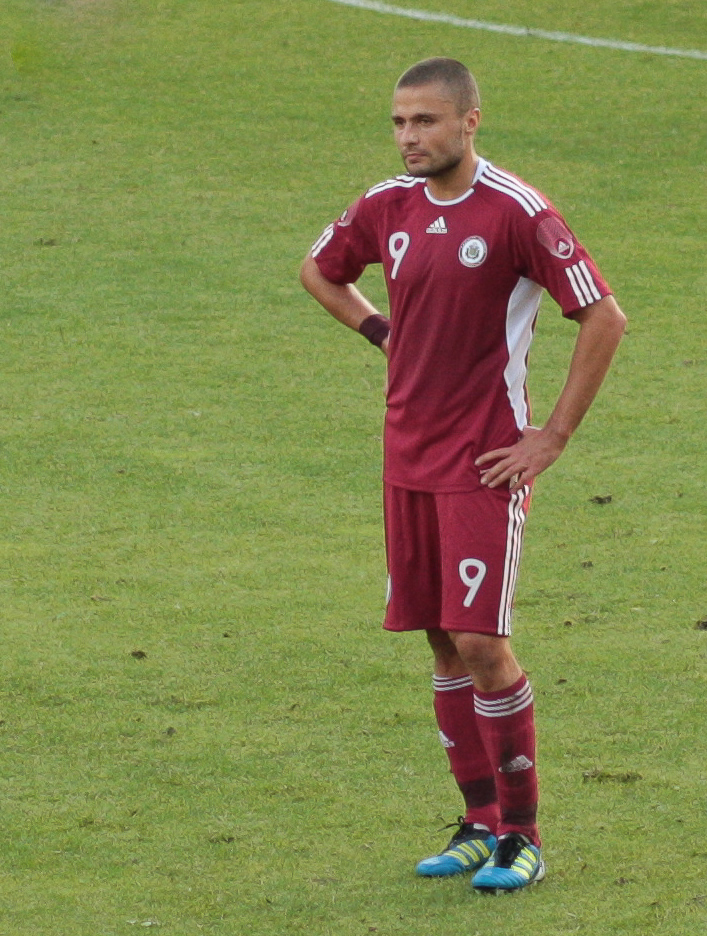
Māris Verpakovskis

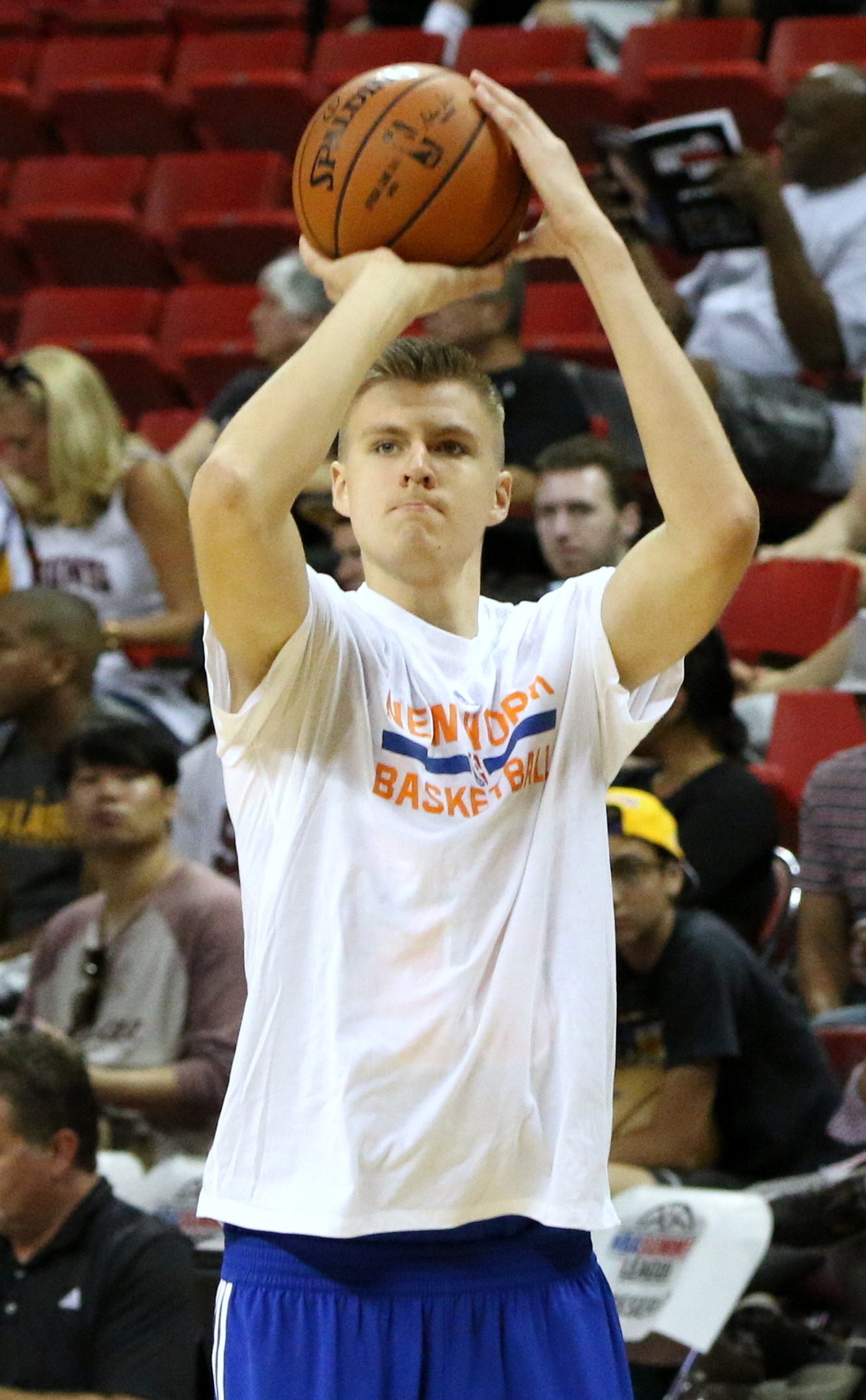
Kristaps Porziņģis

== See also ==
- Latvia at the Olympics
- List of Latvians in the NHL
- List of Latvian sportspeople
