= Aldon =

Aldon may refer to:

== People ==
=== Given name ===
- Aldon J. Anderson (1917–1996), American judge
- Aldon Baker (born 1971), South African trainer of motorcycle racers
- Aldon Lewis Lenard (1921–2007), Canadian athlete and administrator
- Aldon Morris (born 1949), American sociologist
- Aldon Lynn Nielsen (born 1950), American poet and literary critic
- Aldon Smith (born 1989), American football player
- Lefty Wilkie (1914–1992), Canadian-American baseball player

=== Last name ===
- Mari Aldon (1925–2004), American actress

== Fictional characters ==
- Aldon Reese, in the 2023 American television series FUBAR

== Other uses ==
- Aldon, a hamlet near Stokesay, England
- Aldon Inc., subsidiary of Rocket Software, an American software company
- Aldon Music, American music publishing company

== See also ==
- Hugh Aldons (1925–2024), Ceylonese triple international in field hockey, cricket and rugby union
- Aldons Vrubļevskis (born 1957), Latvian lawyer and sports official
