= Aldons =

Aldons is a given name and surname. Notable people with the name include:

- Aldons Vrubļevskis (born 1957), a Latvian lawyer and sports official
- Hugh Aldons (1925–2024), a Sri Lankan-Australian athlete

== See also ==
- Aldon (disambiguation)
