= Dießner =

Dießner is a surname. Notable people with the surname include:

- Bernd Dießner (born 1946), East German long-distance runner
- Jörg Dießner (born 1977), German rower
- Ullrich Dießner (born 1954), German rower
- Walter Dießner (born 1954), German rower
