= Juan Bueno =

Juan Bueno may refer to:

- Juan Bueno Torio (born 1953), Mexican politician
- Juan Bueno (sport shooter) (born 1946), Mexican sport shooter
- Juan Bueno (rower), (born 1957), Cuban rower
- Rhaphithamnus venustus, a plant known locally as Juan Bueno
