= Gordon Rankine =

British rower

Personal information
- Nationality: British
- Born: 30 May 1954 (age 71) Islington, London

Sport
- Sport: Rowing

Gordon A Rankine (born 30 May 1954) is a retired British rower who competed at the 1980 Summer Olympics.

== Rowing career ==
Rankine was part of the British eight at the 1975 World Rowing Championships in Nottingham, the crew finished 9th overall after a third-place finish in the B final. In 1977 he was part of the eight that reached the final and finished 5th, at the 1977 World Rowing Championships in Amsterdam. He was selected by Great Britain for the men's coxed four event with Lenny Robertson, Colin Seymour, John Roberts and Alan Inns, the crew finished in seventh place.
