= Steppin' Razor =

Steppin' Razor may refer to:

== Music ==
- "Steppin' Razor", 1967 song written by Joe Higgs and recorded by:
  - Junior Byles, "Cutting Razor", from the 1974 single Cutting Razor
  - Peter Tosh, from the 1977 album Equal Rights
  - Bob Marley & the Wailers, from The Complete Bob Marley & the Wailers 1967–1972
  - Sinéad O'Connor, on tour for the 2005 album Throw Down Your Arms
  - Sublime, on the 1994 album Robbin' the Hood
  - The Kills, as the B-side to their cover of Saul Williams' "List of Demands," released as a single in 2018
- Steppin' Razor (band), a reggae band started by Pamela Fleming
- An alternative name for the British electronic music band Underworld

== Fiction ==
- Steppin' Razor (comics), a Marvel Comics character
- Molly Millions, a character in the 1984 cyberpunk novel Neuromancer by William Gibson
- "Steppin' Razor", a 2014 short story by Maurice Broaddus
- Stepping Razor, a 1997 book of poetry by Aldon Lynn Nielsen

== Other uses ==
- Steppin' Razor, a radio program with Jamaican dub poet Mutabaruka
- Stepping Razor: Red X, a 1992 documentary film about Peter Tosh's life
