= Noel Graham =

Noel Graham may refer to:

- Noel Graham (bowls) (born 1968), Northern Irish international lawn and indoor bowler
- Noel Graham (rowing) (born 1944), Irish rowing cox
