= Grzegorz Nowak =

Grzegorz Nowak may refer to:

- Grzegorz Nowak (conductor) (born 1951), Polish conductor
- Grzegorz Nowak (rower) (born 1954), Polish rower
