= Georgi Petkov =

Georgi Petkov may refer to:

- Georgi Petkov (footballer, born 1976), Bulgarian football goalkeeper
- Georgi Petkov (footballer, born 1988), Bulgarian football defender
- Georgi Petkov (rower) (born 1956), Bulgarian Olympic rower
