= Manzenreiter =

Manzenreiter is a German surname. Notable people with the surname include:

- Robert Manzenreiter (born 1966), Austrian luger
- Sonja Manzenreiter (born 1975), Austrian luger
