= Stoyan Stoyanov (rower) =

Bulgarian rower

Personal information
- Nationality: Bulgarian
- Born: 15 February 1956 (age 69)

Sport
- Sport: Rowing

Stoyan Stoyanov (Bulgarian: Стоян Стоянов; born 15 February 1956) is a Bulgarian rower. He competed in the men's coxed four event at the 1980 Summer Olympics.
