= Double international =

A double international or dual international is someone who has represented their country at international level in at least two sports. Such people have always been exceptional, and with increasing specialisation have become more so.

They are to be distinguished from people who have represented at least two countries in the same sport. For those, see Category:Change of nationality in sport.

== See also ==
- List of cricket and rugby union players § Dual internationals
- List of English cricket and football players § Double internationals
- List of New Zealand double-international sportspeople
- List of dual-code rugby internationals
- Hugh Aldons (1925–2024), Ceylonese cricketer, field hockey player and rugby union player (triple international)
- Brian Booth (1933–2023), Australian field hockey player (1956) and cricketer (1961–1966)
- M. J. Gopalan (1909–2003), Indian cricketer (1934) and field hockey player (1935)
- Sir Everton Weekes (1925–2020), West Indies cricketer 1948–1958, Barbados bridge player 1974–1990
