= Peter Stocker =

Swiss rower

Personal information
- Nationality: Swiss
- Born: 5 October 1956 (age 68)

Sport
- Sport: Rowing

Peter Stocker (born 5 October 1956) is a Swiss rower. He competed in the men's coxed four event at the 1980 Summer Olympics.
