= Dieter Wendisch =

East German rower

Personal information
- Born: 9 May 1953 (age 73) Gauernitz, Bezirk Dresden, East Germany
- Height: 192 cm (6 ft 4 in)
- Weight: 91 kg (201 lb)

Sport
- Sport: Rowing
Medal record
Men's rowing
Representing East Germany
Olympic Games
Gold medal – first place	1976 Montreal	Eight
Gold medal – first place	1980 Moscow	Coxed four
World Rowing Championships
Gold medal – first place	1975 Nottingham	Eight
Gold medal – first place	1977 Amsterdam	Coxed four
Gold medal – first place	1978 Cambridge	Coxed four

Dieter Wendisch (born 9 May 1953) is a German rower who competed for East Germany in the 1976 Summer Olympics.

He was born in Gauernitz in the Bezirk Dresden of East Germany. In 1976, he was a crew member of the East German boat, which won the gold medal in the eight event. Four years later, he won his second gold medal with the East German boat in the coxed four competition.
