= Davey Gray =

Irish rower

Personal information
- Nationality: Irish
- Born: 28 July 1954 (age 70)

Sport
- Sport: Rowing

Davey Gray (born 28 July 1954) is an Irish rower. He competed in the men's coxed four event at the 1980 Summer Olympics.
