= List of Latvians in the NHL =

The following Latvian ice hockey players have played in the National Hockey League (NHL).

Apart from the players listed below, there have been several NHL players of Latvian descent. Harold Snepsts, Mike Knuble as well as Aris Brimanis and Jarrod Skalde are among such examples.

== Players ==
This is a list of players drafted in the NHL Amateur and Entry Draft. In 1975 Viktor Khatulev became the first Latvian and also the first Soviet hockey player to be drafted. Alberts Šmits is the currently highest drafted Latvian player in history, taken 5th overall by the New York Rangers in 2026.

Red players have not officially played a game in the NHL.

Name	Position	Draft Year	Team	Round	No.
Olivers Murnieks	F	2026	Buffalo Sabres	4	124
Patriks Plumins	G	2026	Toronto Maple Leafs	4	114
Rudolfs Berzkalns	F	2026	Edmonton Oilers	2	58
Alberts Šmits	D	2026	New York Rangers	1	5
Darels Uļjanskis	D	2024	Anaheim Ducks	7	214
Mikus Vecvanags	G	2024	Montreal Canadiens	5	134
Eriks Mateiko	F	2024	Washington Capitals	3	90
Klāvs Veinbergs	F	2022	Tampa Bay Lightning	7	224
Sandis Vilmanis	F	2022	Florida Panthers	5	157
Dans Ločmelis	F	2022	Boston Bruins	4	119
Raivis Ansons	F	2020	Pittsburgh Penguins	5	149
Artūrs Šilovs	G	2019	Vancouver Canucks	6	156
Rodrigo Ābols	F	2016	Vancouver Canucks	7	184
Rūdolfs Balcers	F	2015	San Jose Sharks	5	142
Kārlis Čukste	D	2015	San Jose Sharks	5	130
Mārtiņš Dzierkals	F	2015	Toronto Maple Leafs	3	68
Edgars Kulda	F	2014	Arizona Coyotes	7	193
Elvis Merzļikins	G	2014	Columbus Blue Jackets	3	76
Kristers Gudļevskis	G	2013	Tampa Bay Lightning	5	124
Teodors Bļugers	F	2012	Pittsburgh Penguins	2	52
Zemgus Girgensons	F	2012	Buffalo Sabres	1	14
Kristiāns Pelšs	F	2010	Edmonton Oilers	7	181
Artūrs Kulda	D	2006	Atlanta Thrashers	7	200
Kaspars Daugaviņš	F	2006	Ottawa Senators	3	91
Oskars Bārtulis	D	2005	Philadelphia Flyers	3	91
Mārtiņš Karsums	F	2004	Boston Bruins	2	64
Lauris Dārziņš	F	2003	Nashville Predators	9	268
Raimonds Daņiličs	F	2003	Tampa Bay Lightning	8	255
Armands Bērziņš	F	2002	Minnesota Wild	5	155
Krišjānis Rēdlihs	D	2002	New Jersey Devils	5	154
Jēkabs Rēdlihs	D	2002	Columbus Blue Jackets	4	119
Juris Štāls	F	2001	New York Rangers	9	269
Jānis Sprukts	F	2000	Florida Panthers	8	234
Agris Saviels	D	2000	Colorado Avalanche	2	63
Georgijs Pujacs	D	1999	Boston Bruins	9	264
Kaspars Astašenko	D	1999	Tampa Bay Lightning	5	127
Kārlis Skrastiņš	D	1998	Nashville Predators	8	230
Aleksandrs Andrejevs	D	1997	Phoenix Coyotes	8	207
Harijs Vītoliņš	F	1993	Winnipeg Jets	9	228
Aleksandrs Kerčs	F	1993	Edmonton Oilers	3	60
Viktors Ignatjevs	D	1992	San Jose Sharks	11	243
Grigorijs Panteļejevs	F	1992	Boston Bruins	6	136
Sergejs Žoltoks	F	1992	Boston Bruins	3	55
Sandis Ozoliņš	D	1991	San Jose Sharks	2	30
Helmuts Balderis	F	1989	Minnesota North Stars	12	238
Artūrs Irbe	G	1989	Minnesota North Stars	10	196
Harijs Vītoliņš	F	1988	Montreal Canadiens	9	228
Viktors Hatuļevs	F	1975	Philadelphia Flyers	9	160

There have also been 7 undrafted Latvian NHL players - Herberts Vasiļjevs, Pēteris Skudra, Raitis Ivanāns, Ronalds Ķēniņš, Matīss Kivlenieks, Kristiāns Rubīns and Uvis Balinskis.

== Statistics ==
Sandis Ozoliņš is the record-holder in all categories, while Kārlis Skrastiņš owned the NHL record for most consecutive games by a defenceman.

=== Regular season ===
==== Skaters ====
Players marked in green are currently still active as of the 2025–26 NHL season

GP - Games Played; G - Goals A - Assists P - Points

PIM - Penalty Minutes

Name	Position	GP	G	A	P	PIM
Sandis Ozoliņš	D	875	167	397	564	638
Sergejs Žoltoks	F	588	111	147	258	166
Zemgus Girgensons	F	844	100	114	214	270
Teodors Bļugers	F	453	58	111	169	188
Kārlis Skrastiņš	D	832	32	104	136	375
Rūdolfs Balcers	F	170	28	34	62	50
Uvis Balinskis	D	156	10	26	36	65
Raitis Ivanāns	F	282	12	6	18	569
Rodrigo Ābols	F	64	5	10	15	22
Herberts Vasiļjevs	F	51	8	7	15	22
Kaspars Daugaviņš	F	91	6	9	15	21
Grigorijs Panteļejevs	F	54	8	6	14	12
Ronalds Ķēniņš	F	38	4	8	12	14
Oskars Bārtulis	D	66	1	8	9	32
Helmuts Balderis	F	26	3	6	9	2
Mārtiņš Karsums	F	24	1	5	6	6
Sandis Vilmanis	F	19	3	2	5	4
Kaspars Astašenko	D	23	1	2	3	8
Jānis Sprukts	F	14	1	2	3	2
Artūrs Kulda	D	15	0	2	2	8
Viktors Ignatjevs	D	11	0	1	1	6
Harijs Vītoliņš	F	8	0	0	0	4
Aleksandrs Kerčs	F	5	0	0	0	2
Kristiāns Rubīns	D	3	0	0	0	4
Alberts Šmits	D	1	0	0	0	0

==== Goaltenders ====
Players marked in green are currently still active as of the 2025–26 NHL season

GP - Games Played Mins - Minutes Played W - Wins L - Losses T - Ties (Overtime Losses since 2005-06) SO - Shutouts A - Assists PIM - Penalty Minutes GA - Goals Against GAA - Goals Against Average Saves - Shots Saved

Save% - Percentage of Shots Saved

Name	GP	Mins	W	L	T	SO	A	PIM	GA	GAA	Saves	Save%
Artūrs Irbe	568	32,066	218	236	79	33	9	90	1,513	2.83	14,092	0.899
Elvis Merzļikins	274	15,301	108	111	38	12	7	24	821	3.22	7,367	0.900
Pēteris Skudra	146	7,163	51	47	20	6	2	6	326	2.73	3,078	0.894
Artūrs Šilovs	58	3,339	27	20	10	2	3	6	171	3.07	906	0.886
Matīss Kivlenieks	6	285	1	1	2	0	0	0	14	2.95	137	0.898
Kristers Gudļevskis	3	132	1	0	1	0	0	0	3	1.37	73	0.959

=== Playoffs ===
==== Scoring ====
Name	Pos	GP	G	A	P	PIM
Sandis Ozoliņš	D	137	23	67	90	131
Sergejs Žoltoks	F	45	4	14	18	0
Teodors Bļugers	F	37	2	4	6	10
Kārlis Skrastiņš	D	20	0	3	3	12
Ronalds Ķēniņš	F	5	1	1	2	4
Uvis Balinskis	D	5	1	0	1	2
Zemgus Girgensons	F	12	0	0	0	4
Oskars Bārtulis	D	7	0	0	0	4
Kaspars Daugaviņš	F	7	0	0	0	2
Viktors Ignatjevs	D	1	0	0	0	2

==== Goaltenders ====
Name	GP	Mins	W	L	SO	GA	GAA	Saves	Save%
Artūrs Irbe	51	2,981	23	27	0	142	2.86	1,439	0.901
Artūrs Šilovs	13	795	7	4	2	34	2.57	331	0.907
Pēteris Skudra	3	116	0	1	0	6	2	51	0.895
Elvis Merzļikins	2	123	1	1	0	4	1.96	70	0.946
Kristers Gudļevskis	2	40	0	1	0	2	3.02	18	0.900

== See also ==
- List of Latvians in the Kontinental Hockey League
