= Peter Rahn =

Swiss rower

Personal information
- Nationality: Swiss
- Born: 12 October 1953 (age 71)

Sport
- Sport: Rowing

Peter Rahn (born 12 October 1953) is a Swiss rower. He competed in the men's coxed four event at the 1980 Summer Olympics.
