= List of New Zealand double-international sportspeople =

The following is a list of New Zealand double international sportspeople; that is, New Zealanders who have represented their nation in full international sporting events in more than one sport.

== Men ==
=== Association football and cricket ===
- Grahame Bilby
- Ces Dacre
- Ken Hough
- Don McRae
- Vic Pollard

Note: Hough has the unique distinction of playing cricket for New Zealand and football for both New Zealand and Australia.

=== Badminton and cricket ===
- Phil Horne

=== Canoeing and surf lifesaving ===
- Cory Hutchings

=== Canoeing and swimming ===
- Steven Ferguson

=== Cricket and hockey ===
- Eddie McLeod
- Gordon Rowe
- Keith Thomson

=== Cricket and rugby union ===
- Bill Carson
- George Dickinson
- Brian McKechnie
- Charlie Oliver
- Curly Page
- Eric Tindill
- Jeff Wilson

Note: Martin Donnelly represented New Zealand at cricket and England at rugby union. Ofisa Tonu'u played rugby union for both Samoa and New Zealand, and cricket for Samoa. Eric Tindill uniquely not only played international cricket and rugby union but also officiated as a test cricket umpire and international rugby referee.

=== Cycling and powerlifting ===
- Eddie Dawkins

=== Cycling and rowing ===
- Hamish Bond

=== Cycling and speed skating ===
- Chris Nicholson

=== Ki-o-Rahi and rugby ===
- Buck Shelford

=== Rugby league and rugby union ===
In all, 37 sportsmen have represented New Zealand at both rugby codes. The full list can be found at List of dual-code rugby internationals#New Zealand. Below are some of the more notable dual internationals:

- Frano Botica – represented New Zealand in both codes, and also represented Croatia in rugby union
- Marc Ellis
- Craig Innes
- George Nēpia
- Matthew Ridge
- John Timu
- Sonny Bill Williams – also represented New Zealand in rugby sevens
- Roger Tuivasa-Sheck

==== Rugby league for New Zealand and rugby union for another country ====
- Shontayne Hape (represented England at rugby union)
- Frederick Stanley Jackson (represented the British Lions at rugby union)
- Emosi Koloto (represented Tonga at rugby union)
- Tasesa Lavea (represented Samoa at rugby union)
- Dally Messenger (represented Australia at rugby union)
- Henry Paul (represented England at rugby union)
- Lesley Vainikolo (represented England at rugby union)

==== Rugby union for New Zealand and rugby league for another country ====
- John Schuster (represented Samoa at rugby league)
- Brad Thorn (represented Australia at rugby league)
- Va'aiga Tuigamala (represented Samoa at rugby league)

Note: Frano Botica represented New Zealand at both codes, and also represented Croatia union.

Rugby Union and Athletics

- Bruce Hunter All Blacks (1970-71) and 800m New Zealand Games (1975)

=== Water polo and rugby league ===
- Brent Todd

== Women ==
=== Association football and cricket ===
- Rebecca Rolls

=== Association football and rugby union ===
- Melissa Ruscoe

Note: Ruscoe has not only represented New Zealand in both sports, but has also captained both the Football Ferns and Black Ferns.

=== Rugby and volleyball ===
- Kimberly Smith

Volleyferns captain

=== Rugby union and netball ===
- Louisa Wall

=== Basketball and cricket ===
- Suzie Bates

=== Basketball and netball ===
Player	Netball Apps	Years	Basketball Apps	Years
Sheryl Burns	8	1992–1993		1985–1991, 1995
Belinda Colling	92	1996–2006		2000
Lynne Macdonald	2	1969		
Lois Muir	13	1960–1964		1952–1962
Jessica Tuki	3	2006		2014
Donna Wilkins	56	1996–2002	95	2000–2006
Maia Wilson	36	2016–		2014
Parris Mason	5	2024–	8	2022-2023

=== Beach volleyball, volleyball and netball ===
- Anna Scarlett

=== Cricket and netball ===
- Kate Heffernan

=== Cricket and hockey ===
- Sophie Devine
- Liz Perry
- Betty Watt (née Thorner)

=== Cross-country skiing, cycling, and endurance equestrian events ===
- Madonna Harris

== See also ==
- List of dual-code rugby internationals
- List of cricket and rugby union players
