= Khristo Aleksandrov =

Bulgarian rower

Personal information
- Nationality: Bulgarian
- Born: 4 December 1957 (age 67)

Sport
- Sport: Rowing

Khristo Aleksandrov (born 4 December 1957) is a Bulgarian rower. He competed in the men's coxed four event at the 1980 Summer Olympics.
