= Božidar Đorđević =

Yugoslav rower

Božidar Ðorđević
Personal information
- Nationality: Yugoslav
- Born: 12 April 1959 (age 67)

Sport
- Sport: Rowing

Božidar Ðorđević (born 12 April 1959) is a Yugoslav rower. He competed in the men's coxed four event at the 1980 Summer Olympics.
