= Daniel Homberger =

Swiss rower

Personal information
- Nationality: Swiss
- Born: 3 September 1955 (age 70)

Sport
- Sport: Rowing

Daniel Homberger (born 3 September 1955) is a Swiss rower. He competed in the men's coxed four event at the 1980 Summer Olympics.
