= Reiner Margreiter =

Austrian luger (born 1975)

Medal record

Luge

Representing Austria

World Championships
Bronze medal – third place	2003 Sigulda	Men's singles
Bronze medal – third place	2003 Sigulda	Mixed team

Rainer Margreiter (born 26 June 1975) is an Austrian luger who competed from 1995 to 2006. He won two bronze medals at the 2003 FIL World Luge Championships in Sigulda, Latvia in both the men's singles and the mixed team events.

Competing in two Winter Olympics, his best finish was tenth in the men's singles event at Salt Lake City in 2002
