= Andreas Gregor =

East German coxswain

Personal information
- Born: 27 April 1955 (age 71) Dresden, East Germany
- Height: 1.62 m (5 ft 4 in)
- Weight: 50 kg (110 lb)

Sport
- Sport: Rowing
- Club: SC Einheit Dresden
Medal record
Representing East Germany
Olympic Games
Gold medal – first place	1980 Moscow	Coxed four
World Championships
Gold medal – first place	1977 Amsterdam	Coxed four
Gold medal – first place	1978 Hamilton	Coxed four
Gold medal – first place	1982 Lucerne	Coxed four
Gold medal – first place	1983 Dusiburg	Coxed pair

Andreas Gregor (born 27 April 1955) is a retired German rowing coxswain who had his best achievements in the coxed fours. In this event he won a gold medal at the 1980 Olympics as well as three world titles in 1977, 1978 and 1982. He won another world title in 1983, in coxed pairs. For his Olympic achievement Gregor was awarded the Patriotic Order of Merit in 1980.
