= Latvian Olympic Committee =

National Olympic Committee

- Country: Latvia
- Code: LAT
- Created: 1922
- Recognized: 1923, 1991
- Continental Association: EOC
- Headquarters: Riga, Latvia
- President: Raimonds Lazdiņš
- Secretary General: Raitis Keselis
- Website: olimpiade.lv

The Latvian Olympic Committee (Latvian: Latvijas Olimpiskā komiteja, LOK; IOC Code: LAT) is a non-profit organization that is the National Olympic Committee for Latvia. Its headquarters are in Riga.

== History ==
The Committee was created on 23 April 1922. In 1923, it received a notice from the International Olympic Committee that Latvia could take part in the next Olympic Games. After the occupation of Latvia by the Soviet Union in 1940, its activity was suspended. During this time, Latvians competed as part of USSR delegation.

The committee was reformed on 17 September 1988 and was recognized by the IOC in 1991.

== List of LOK Presidents ==
President	Term
Jānis Dikmanis	1922-1933
Roberts Plūme	1933-1934
Marģers Skujenieks	1934-1938
Alfreds Bērziņš	1938-1940
Committee suspended after the occupation of Latvia by the Soviet Union	1940-1988
Vilnis Baltiņš	1988-2004
Aldons Vrubļevskis	2004-2020
Žoržs Tikmers	2020-2023
Jānis Buks	2023-2024
Raimonds Lazdiņš	2024-present

== Member federations ==
The Latvian National Federations are the organizations that coordinate all aspects of their individual sports. They are responsible for training, competition and development of their sports. There are currently 29 Olympic Summer and eight Winter Sport Federations and two another Sports Federations in Latvia.

=== Olympic Sport federations ===
National Federation	Summer or Winter	Headquarters
Latvian Archery Federation	Summer	Riga
Latvian Athletics Association	Summer	Riga
Latvian Alpinist Association	Winter	Riga
Latvian Badminton Federation	Summer	Riga
Latvian Baseball Federation	Summer	Riga
Latvian Basketball Association	Summer	Riga
Latvian Biathlon Federation	Winter	Riga
Latvian Bobsleigh and Skeleton Federation	Winter	Riga
Latvian Boxing Federation	Summer	Riga
Latvian Canoe Federation	Summer	Riga
Latvian Curling Federation	Winter	Riga
Latvian Cycling Federation	Summer	Riga
Latvian Equestrian Federation	Summer	Riga
Latvian Fencing Federation	Summer	Riga
Latvian Football Federation	Summer	Riga
Latvian Golf Federation	Summer	Riga
Latvian Gymnastics Federation	Summer	Riga
Latvian Handball Federation	Summer	Riga
Latvian Ice Hockey Federation	Winter	Riga
Latvian Judo Federation	Summer	Riga
Latvian Karate Federation	Summer	Riga
Latvian Luge Federation	Winter	Riga
Latvian Modern Pentathlon Federation	Summer	Riga
Latvian Rowing Federation	Summer	Jūrmala
Latvian Rugby Federation	Summer	Riga
Yachting Union of Latvia	Summer	Riga
Latvian Shooting Federation	Summer	Riga
Latvian Skating Association	Winter	Riga
Latvian Ski Federation	Winter	Riga
Latvian Swimming Federation	Summer	Riga
Latvian Table Tennis Federation	Summer	Riga
Latvian Taekwondo Federation	Summer	Riga
Latvian Tennis Union	Summer	Jūrmala
Latvian Triathlon Federation	Summer	Riga
Latvian Volleyball Federation	Summer	Riga
Latvian Weightlifting Federation	Summer	Ventspils
Latvian Wrestling Federation	Summer	Riga

=== Other federations ===
National Federation	Headquarters
Latvian Olympic Club	Riga
Latvian Skateboard Federation	Riga

== Latvian Olympiad ==
Beginning in 2004, the Latvian Olympic Committee has organised a multi-sport event called the Latvian Olympiad (Latvijas Olimpiāde), usually shortly before the corresponding Olympic Games. Summer and Winter Latvian Olympiads and Youth Olympiads have been held. These are modelled on the Olympic Games, with teams representing Latvian municipalities, an opening and closing ceremony. In some cases, Olympiad competitions have served as qualifiers to the Latvian Olympic team.

== See also ==
- Latvia at the Olympics
- Latvian Paralympic Committee
