= Henrique Johann =

Brazilian rower

Personal information
- Nationality: Brazilian
- Born: 11 October 1956 (age 68)

Sport
- Sport: Rowing

Henrique Johann (born 11 October 1956) is a Brazilian rower. He competed in the men's coxed four event at the 1980 Summer Olympics.
