= FIL World Luge Championships 2003 =

The FIL World Luge Championships 2003 took place in Sigulda, Latvia. The team event was adjusted to one nation per team at these championships.

== Men's singles ==
Medal	Athlete	Time
Gold	Armin Zöggeler (ITA)	
Silver	Mārtiņš Rubenis (LAT)	
Bronze	Reiner Margreiter (AUT)	

== Women's singles ==
Medal	Athlete	Time
Gold	Sylke Otto (GER)	
Silver	Silke Kraushaar (GER)	
Bronze	Barbara Niedernhuber (GER)	

== Men's doubles ==
Medal	Athlete	Time
Gold	Austria (Andreas Linger, Wolfgang Linger)	
Silver	Austria (Tobias Schiegl, Markus Schiegl)	
Bronze	Germany (Patric Leitner, Alexander Resch)	

== Mixed team ==
Medal	Athlete	Time
Gold	Germany (Georg Hackl, Sylke Otto, Patric Leitner, Alexander Resch)	
Silver	Latvia (Mārtiņš Rubenis, Anna Orlova, Zigmars Berkolds, Sandris Berzins)	
Bronze	Austria (Reiner Margreiter, Sonja Manzenreiter, Wolfgang Linger, Andreas Linger)	

== Medal table ==
Rank	Nation	Gold	Silver	Bronze	Total
1	Germany (GER)	2	1	2	5
2	Austria (AUT)	1	1	2	4
3	Italy (ITA)	1	0	0	1
4	Latvia (LAT)	0	2	0	2
Totals (4 entries)		4	4	4	12
