= Antonín Barák (rowing) =

Czech coxswain

Personal information
- Nationality: Czech
- Born: 11 July 1956 (age 69) Brno, Czechoslovakia

Sport
- Country: Czechoslovakia
- Sport: Rowing

Antonín Barák (born 11 July 1956) is a Czech rowing coxswain. He competed for Czechoslovakia in the men's coxed four event at the 1980 Summer Olympics.
