= Gottfried Döhn =

East German rower

Personal information
- Born: 10 June 1951 (age 75) Dresden, East Germany
- Height: 196 cm (6 ft 5 in)
- Weight: 96 kg (212 lb)

Sport
- Sport: Rowing
Medal record
Men's rowing
Representing East Germany
Olympic Games
Gold medal – first place	1976 Montreal	Eight
Gold medal – first place	1980 Moscow	Coxed four
World Rowing Championships
Gold medal – first place	1975 Nottingham	Eight
Gold medal – first place	1977 Amsterdam	Coxed four
Gold medal – first place	1978 Cambridge	Coxed four
European Rowing Championships
Gold medal – first place	1973 Moscow	Coxless four

Gottfried Döhn (born 10 June 1951) is a German rower who competed for East Germany in the 1976 Summer Olympics.

He was born in Dresden. In 1976, he was a crew member of the East German boat, which won the gold medal in the eights event. Four years later, he won his second gold medal with the East German boat in the coxed fours competition.
