= Dzintars Krišjānis =

Latvian rower (1958–2014)

Olympic medal record

Men's rowing

Representing the Soviet Union
Silver medal – second place	1980 Moscow	Coxed four

Dzintars Krišjānis (4 June 1958 – 16 March 2014) was a Latvian former rower who competed for the Soviet Union in the 1980 Summer Olympics. He was born in Riga and was the older brother of Dimants Krišjānis. In 1980 he was a crew member of the Soviet boat which won the silver medal in the coxed fours event.
