= Aldons Vrubļevskis =

Latvian lawyer and sports official

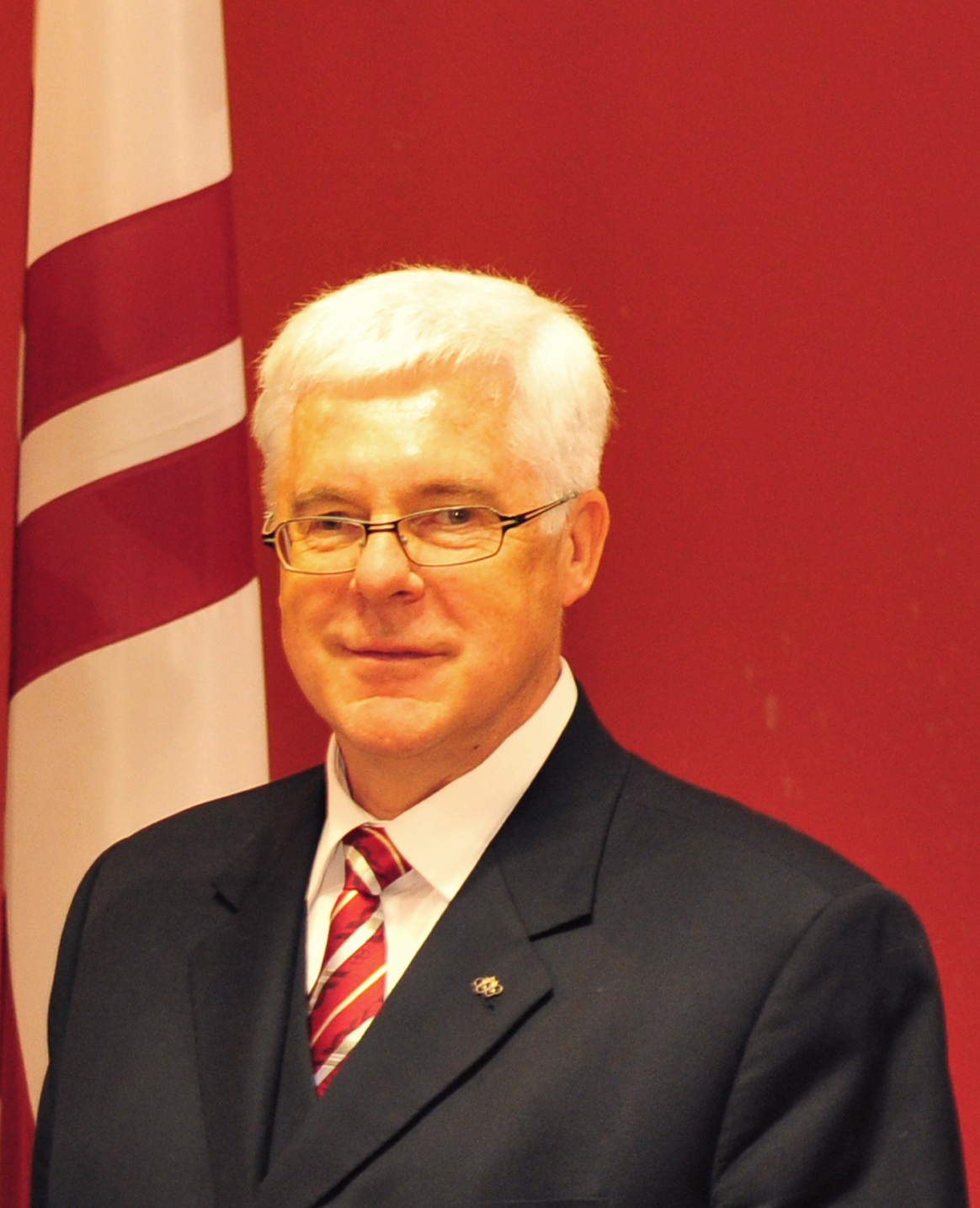
- Aldons Vrubļevskis in 2012
- Born: June 2, 1957 (age 69); Zaļenieki, Soviet Union (now Latvia)
- Education: University of Latvia
- Occupation: Lawyer

Aldons Vrubļevskis (born 2 June 1957) is a Latvian lawyer and sports official. From 2004 to 2020 he was the president of the Latvian Olympic Committee.

He was the secretary general of the Latvian Olympic Committee from 1988 to 2004, and became the president of the Latvian Olympic Committee in 2004.

In collaboration with Olympic historian Mr. Genadijs Maricevs (LAT) is creating and publishing multivolume edition "Olympic Encyclopedia" (12 volumes are published 2016 - 2022 and two more are expected in 2023).

Awarded by the IOC "Pierre de Coubertin Medal" in 2020.

Sporting positions
Preceded by Vilnis Baltiņš	President of the Latvian Olympic Committee; 2004–2020	Succeeded by Žoržs Tikmers
