= Dimants Krišjānis =

Latvian rower (born 1960)

Medal record

Men's rowing

Representing the Soviet Union

Olympic Games
Silver medal – second place	1980 Moscow	Coxed four

Dimants Krišjānis (born 15 September 1960), also known as Dimants Yutvaldovich Krishyanis (Russian: Димантс Ютвальдович Кришьянис), is a Latvian former rower who competed for the Soviet Union in the 1980 Summer Olympics.

He was born in Riga and is the younger brother of Dzintars Krišjānis.

In 1980 he was a crew member of the Soviet boat which won the silver medal in the coxed fours event.
