= Antonio Riaño =

Cuban rower

Personal information
- Full name: Antonio Luís Riaño González
- Nationality: Cuban
- Born: September 26, 1951 (age 74)
- Height: 6 ft 2 in (1.88 m)
- Weight: 93 kg (205 lb; 14 st 9 lb)

Sport
- Sport: Rowing
Medal record
Men's rowing
Representing CUB
Pan American Games
Gold medal – first place	1979 San Juan	Coxed four
Bronze medal – third place	1979 San Juan	Eight

Antonio Luís Riaño González (born 26 September 1951) is a Cuban rower. He competed in two events at the 1980 Summer Olympics in Moscow: the men's eight and men's coxed four events. At the 1979 Pan American Games in San Juan, Puerto Rico, Riaño's team secured two medals in rowing: a gold medal in the men's coxed four and a bronze medal in the men's eight.

== Olympic participation ==
- Antonio Riaño competed in two events at the 1980 Summer Olympics in Moscow:
  - Men's Eight: The Cuban team, with Riaño as a member, participated in the men's eight event. They competed in the repechage heats, with Riaño's team finishing third in their heat with a time of 5:56.19. In the final B, they placed eighth with a time of 6:14.98.
  - Men's Coxed Four: Riaño also competed in the men's coxed four event. In the repechage heats, his team finished fourth in their heat with a time of 6:54.32. They did not advance to the final

== Pan American Games achievements ==
- At the 1979 Pan American Games in San Juan, Puerto Rico, Riaño's team secured two medals in rowing:
  - Gold Medal: Men's Coxed Four event.
  - Bronze Medal: Men's Eight event.

== Additional references ==
- Boswell, Thomas. "Puerto Rico Leaves a Pan Am Imprint All Its Own." *The Washington Post*, 16 July 1979.
