= Sandris Bērziņš =

Latvian luger (born 1976)

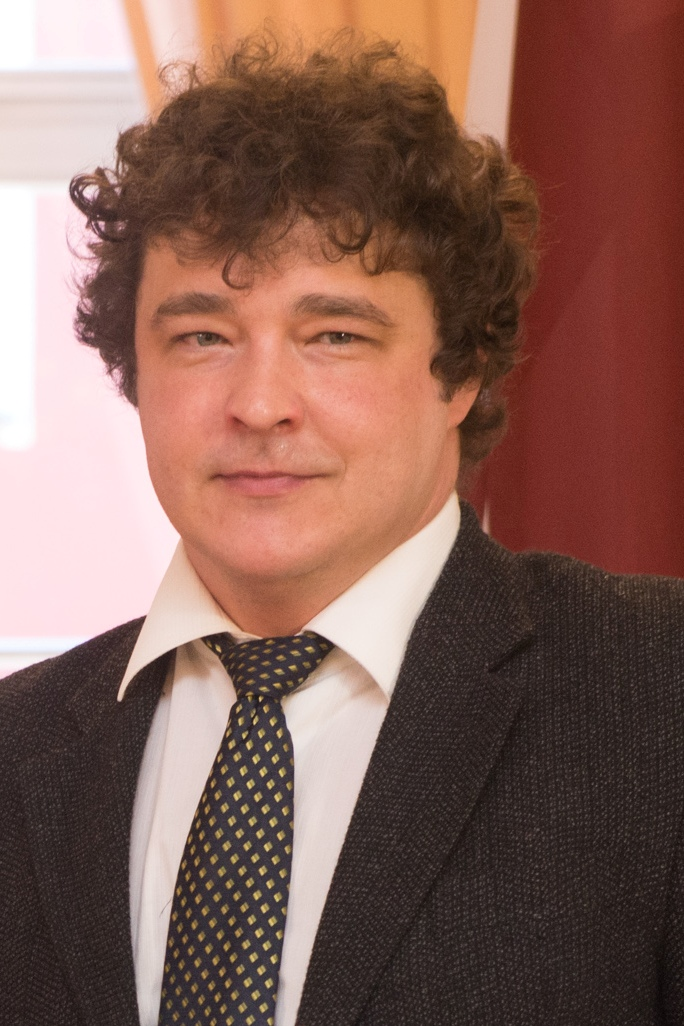

Medal record

Luge

Representing Latvia

World Championships
Silver medal – second place	2003 Sigulda	Mixed team

Sandris Bērziņš (born 15 July 1976) is a Latvian luger who has competed from 1996 to 2005. He won the silver medal in the mixed team event at the 2003 FIL World Luge Championships in Sigulda, Latvia.

Berzins competed in two Winter Olympics, earning his best finish of tenth in the men's doubles event at Salt Lake City in 2002.
