= Vilnis Baltiņš =

Latvian canoeist

Medal record

Men's canoe sprint

World Championships
Gold medal – first place	1966 East Berlin	K-1 4 x 500 m

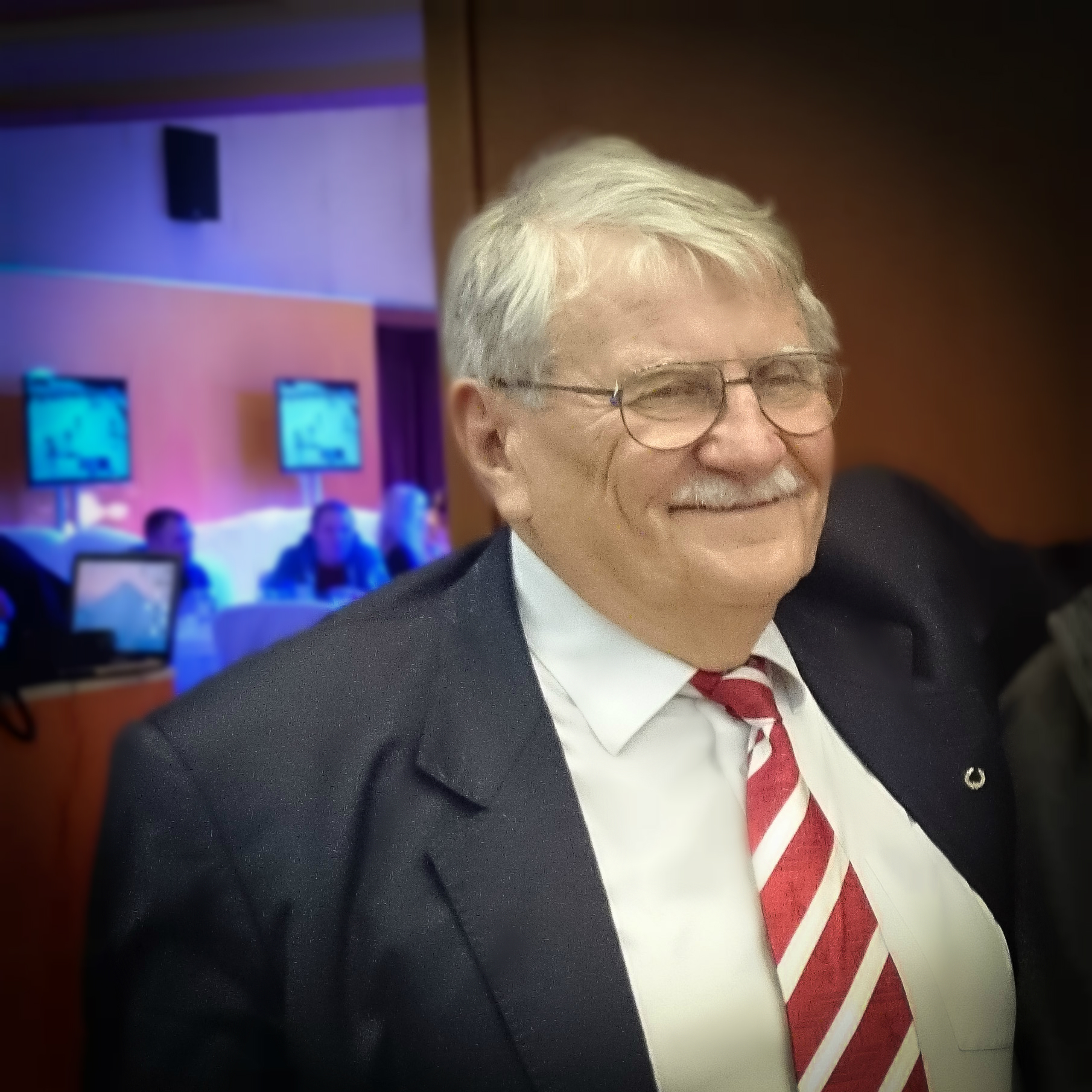
Former long-term head of the Latvian Olympic Committee, Honorary President of the Committee Vilnis Baltiņš

Vilnis Baltiņš (born 30 April 1942 in Ugāle parish) is a Latvian sports executive and a former Latvian Soviet sprint canoeist. He was the first president of the renewed Latvian Olympic Committee (1988–2004). As canoeist, he competed in the mid to late 1960s. He won a gold medal in the K-1 4 x 500 m event at the 1966 ICF Canoe Sprint World Championships in East Berlin.
