= Artūrs Garonskis =

Latvian rower (born 1957)

Medal record

Men's rowing

Representing the Soviet Union

Olympic Games
Silver medal – second place	1980 Moscow	Coxed four

Artūrs Garonskis (born 25 May 1957) is a Latvian former rower who competed for the Soviet Union in the 1980 Summer Olympics.

He was born in Riga.

In 1980 he was a crew member of the Soviet boat which won the silver medal in the coxed fours event.
