= Roland Stocker =

Swiss Australian biochemist (born 1956)

Roland Stocker (born 5 October 1956 in Switzerland) is a Swiss Australian biochemist who discovered the antioxidant activity of bilirubin. He is a former Olympic rower and has represented Switzerland at the 1980 Summer Olympics.

== Early life and education ==
Stocker was awarded a Diplom [im] Naturwissenschaften und Mathematik (Dipl. Natw.), or Diploma in/of Natural Science, from the ETH Zurich in 1981 and a Ph.D. from the Australian National University in 1985.

== Career ==
Stocker has made significant contributions to the understanding of the molecular action of Alpha-Tocopherol (vitamin E) during the oxidation of lipoproteins, the antioxidant activities of ubiquinol-10 in lipoproteins, the contribution of oxidation of low-density lipoprotein to atherosclerosis, the understanding of how antioxidants and heme oxygenase-1 protect against atherosclerosis, the role of myeloperoxidase to atherosclerotic plaque destabilization, and the contribution of tryptophan metabolism by indoleamine 2,3-dioxygenase in the regulation of vascular tone in inflammation.

Stocker is recognized as a "redox pioneer". He is a Fellow of the Swiss Academy of Medical Sciences and the Australian Academy of Health and Medical Sciences.

Formerly, Stocker held an appointment as a professor at the University of New South Wales and the University of Sydney, Australia. Currently, he is Group Leader at the Heart Research Institute.

== Personal life ==
Stocker lives in Sydney, Australia with his wife, Maree Stenglin.

Stocker's twin brother, Peter, was also an Olympic rower for Switzerland.
