= Laildo Machado =

Brazilian rower

Personal information
- Full name: Laildo Ribeiro Machado
- Nationality: Brazilian
- Born: 10 October 1952 (age 72)

Sport
- Sport: Rowing

Laildo Ribeiro Machado (born 10 October 1952) is a Brazilian rower. He competed at the 1980 Summer Olympics and the 1984 Summer Olympics.
