= Daniel Vezis =

Latvian bowler

Daniel Vezis is a two-handed bowler from Latvia. He has won many regional titles and multiple "6 no 36" weekly tournaments. Has represented Latvia in European and International tournaments. And currently is playing on European Bowling Tour 2012 representing England.

== Latvian tournament wins ==
Year	Tournament
2012	Club's cup
2011	4th RT Zelta Prizma meistars
2011	Bowlero Grand final
2010	3rd RT A-Z Boulings masters
2010	Daugavpils Open
2010	QubicaAMF World Cup (National selection)
2003	III Lačplēša Kauss

== Championship and cup medals ==
Tournament	Medal	Event
2011 - Latvian XIVth Championships	Bronze	Men
2011 - European Youth Championships	Bronze	All-event
2011 - European Youth Championships	Silver	Team
2011 - European Youth Championships	Gold	Doubles
2010 - European Youth Championships	Bronze	Doubles
2010 - European Youth Championships	Silver	Singles
2010 - World Youth Championships	Bronze	Masters

== International tournaments ==
Tournament	Place
2011 - Parnu Open 2011	43rd
2011 - Kiev Open	3rd
2011 - Brunswick Ballmaster Open	69th
2012 - Brunswick Ballmaster Open	204th
2012 - 6th International Wroclaw Open	2nd
2012 - 1st Croatia Open	25th
2012 - 6th QubicaAMF Open	8th
2012 - 3rd Track Dream-Bowl Palace Open	70th
2012 - Bowltech Aalborg International 2012	74th
2012 - Odense International open	8th
2012 - Brunswick Italia Challenge	6th
