= Aldon Inc. =

American computer software company

Rocket Aldon
- Type: Subsidiary
- Industry: Computer software
- Founded: 1979
- Headquarters: Waltham, Massachusetts, U.S.
- Parent: Rocket Software
- Website: www.aldon.com

Aldon (previously known as Aldon Computer Group) is a business unit of Rocket Software. It develops, manufactures, licenses and supports software change management products for the enterprise application lifecycle management (ALM) and software change management (SCM) markets.

Headquartered in Waltham, Massachusetts, U.S., Rocket Software also has offices globally. The current suite of Aldon products includes Aldon Lifecycle Manager, Aldon Deployment Manager, Aldon Community Manager, and Aldon CMDB. Aldon invests more than 25% of its revenue into research and development. Companies use Aldon's products for enterprise software application configuration and change management for their IT business processes.

== History ==
=== 1979-1989: Beginnings ===
Aldon Computer Group was founded in 1979 by Albert Magid and Don Parr to provide tools for midrange software developers. It was based in Emeryville, California. The company's products were designed to provide infrastructure around complex software projects.

Aldon's first product, Compare, a file and database compare tool for the IBM mainframe computer, was introduced in 1982. In 1983, S/Compare, the first source change documentation tool on the market, was offered. At that time, Aldon also sold an object file compare tool called O/Compare. Originally developed for the HP 3000, S/Compare was part of a suite of comparison tools for that environment. Designed to enable programmers to identify differences in program code, it used advanced algorithms to provide comparisons that were more accurate than other tools could produce. Customers used S/Compare to identify the changes they had made to purchased packages, allowing them to integrate those changes into new releases of the packages they had bought.

S/Compare was eventually developed into a comprehensive source compare and merge tool, known as Aldon Harmonizer. The product compared current releases with new releases and then merged the versions to create a whole new set of source and objects. It also supported parallel development by identifying and merging the work of two or more programmers who had modified the same program simultaneously.

In the late 1980s, Harmonizer was converted to run on IBM's System/38 minicomputer platform, a precursor to the AS/400 (later known as iSeries, Application System/400, System i and now IBM i). Aldon's decision to convert its product to run on IBM's platform marked Aldon's entry into IBM i development.

Aldon made its home in downtown Oakland, California, for its initial twenty-four years of business, with the first office located in the Financial Center Building on 14th and Franklin Streets. Aldon relocated to Emeryville on February 18, 2003.

=== 1989-1999: An Embrace of IBM's iSeries and Entry into Multi-Platform Development ===
In 1990, Aldon released Aldon/CMS, a software change management (SCM) system for traditional iSeries development. Aldon/CMS was renamed Aldon Lifecycle Manager (iSeries edition).

In 1996, Daniel Magid took the helm as CEO of Aldon. Magid came to Aldon from IBM, where he had worked in both marketing and sales, selling midrange computer systems for the General Systems Division.

In 1997, Aldon began the development of the multi-platform product, Aldon Affiniti, which would allow coders to use process management to handle complex development environments across multiple platforms, including UNIX, Windows, Linux, Mainframe and iSeries.

Aldon Affiniti, later known as Aldon Lifecycle Manager (Enterprise Edition), or LM(e), was released in 1998.

=== 2000–present: Regulatory Compliance, SOA and the Move to Distributed Platforms ===
Regulatory compliance became a much larger concern for businesses after 2004. In 2004-2005, with the collapse of Enron, Global Crossing, Tyco, WorldCom and other financial companies, governments began to mandate standards such as those in the Sarbanes–Oxley Act. While not required for everyone, it became evident to companies that complying with the regulations was good business practice. Companies began seeking automation to assist with SOX compliance. Other industries had their own new sets of compliance requirements: HIPAA (healthcare), Gramm–Leach–Bliley (financial institutions), 21CFR Part 11 (Food and Drug Administration), Basel II (banking laws and regulations), environmental protection laws and standards and more.

In addition, tax code changes, RFID mandates, ISO 9001 and ISO 14000, SEI/CMM, change control management, UCCnet compliance and even tracking and reporting on contractual compliance and service-level agreements, were added to the list. Companies were under enormous pressure to comply with these various and complex mandates.

The crisis was beneficial to software change management companies who for years had championed the benefits of structured, repeatable processes, visibility and audit trails for IT. SCM offered significant benefits to companies implementing best practices to meet compliance requirements. The software could help companies provide what the government was asking of these them.

In May 2004, Aldon announced new brand names for its product suite, as well as the newly shortened company name.

In February 2005, Aldon delivered to market the multiplatform version of Aldon Lifecycle Manager 5.0, which enabled organizations to run their source code repository on any AIX or Linux server, instead of requiring an iSeries server. Using Aldon Lifecycle Manager 5.0, developers could configure their views to individual work requirements, whether they were working with IBM, WebSphere Development Studio, Eclipse or Microsoft tools that are compliant with its Source Code Control Integration (SCCI) APIs. The entry signified additional functionality of the product and moved Aldon from its traditional customer base into a distributed systems customer base. At fiscal year end 2005, the company announced 28 percent growth, which they attributed to the success of the new product functionality.

In January 2007, Aldon joined Microsoft Corporation's Midrange Alliance Program. The MAP was created in 2005 to help iSeries users modernize their legacy environments in the following ways: extending OS/400 applications to Windows, integrating OS/400 and Windows applications and ultimately migrating workloads to Windows from OS/400. Aldon was noted as the first provider of change management software to join the group.

In May 2007, Aldon added features to its ALM offering to further aid parallel development. A graphical interactive compare and merge utility was designed to enable developers working in distributed environments to see what was different between programs. Conflict resolution allowed developers to sort and identify version conflicts using status tags, such as active, pending, or cleared, improving parallel development. Aldon began to see their larger parent corporations implement the product company-wide as their change management standard. Nintendo of America, for example, selected Aldon Lifecycle Manager to manage the development of corporate applications across its multi-platform enterprise.

On May 7, 2007, Aldon announced the acquisition of the business by Marlin Equity Partners, a Los Angeles, California-based private investment firm.

On March 22, 2011, Marlin Equity Partners sold Aldon to Rocket Software, Inc.

== Products ==
Aldon's products include:

- Aldon Lifecycle Manager (Enterprise Edition and IBM i Edition): provides enterprise application configuration and change management. It manages all the parts of an application and its release lifecycles so that all changes move through the appropriate processes before they are promoted to production.
- Aldon Community Manager is an IT Service Desk that manages change requests, requirements and incidents and automates the workflow associated with the software development process. The product enables collaboration in the continuing development and deployment of applications. It also ties IT more closely to business goals by bringing in the right decision makers to prioritize change requests as they arise.
- Aldon Deployment Manager: Working in conjunction with Aldon Lifecycle Manager, Aldon Deployment Manager automates the deployment of all the application parts to the appropriate servers, machines or deployment targets throughout the lifecycle.
- Aldon CMDB is a centralized repository of configuration items (CIs), for IT Service Management. Aldon CMDB works in tandem with Aldon Community Manager to manage change, asset, and portfolio items.

== See also ==
- List of revision control software
- Comparison of revision control software
- Collaborative Development Environment
- Application Lifecycle Management
- Revision Control
