= Juris Bērziņš =

Latvian rower (born 1954)

Medal record

Men's rowing

Representing Soviet Union

Olympic Games
Silver medal – second place	1980 Moscow	Coxed four

Juris Bērziņš (8 March 1954 – 3 April 2004) was a Latvian rower who competed for the Soviet Union in the 1980 Summer Olympics. He was born in Riga, Latvia. In 1980 he was the coxswain of the Soviet boat that won the silver medal in the coxed fours event.
