= Walter Dießner =

East German rower

Personal information
- Born: 27 December 1954 (age 71) Meißen, East Germany
- Height: 1.88 m (6 ft 2 in)
- Weight: 84 kg (185 lb)

Sport
- Sport: Rowing
- Club: SC Einheit Dresden
Medal record
Men's rowing
Representing East Germany
Olympic Games
| Gold medal – first place | 1980 Moscow | Coxed four |
| Silver medal – second place | 1976 Montreal | Coxed four |
World Rowing Championships
| Gold medal – first place | 1974 Lucerne | Coxed four |
| Gold medal – first place | 1977 Amsterdam | Coxed four |
| Gold medal – first place | 1978 Hamilton | Coxed four |
| Gold medal – first place | 1979 Bled | Coxed four |
| Silver medal – second place | 1975 Nottingham | Coxed four |

Walter Dießner (born 26 December 1954) is a retired German rower who had his best achievements in the coxed fours. In this event he won a silver and a gold medal at the 1976 and 1980 Olympics, respectively, as well as four world titles in 1974, 1977, 1978 and 1979.

His twin brother Ullrich rowed together with Walter in most competitions. The brothers have different birth dates because Walter was born before midnight and Ullrich shortly thereafter.
