= Manuel Mandel =

Brazilian rower

Personal information
- Born: 30 September 1936; Rio de Janeiro, Brazil
- Died: 27 September 2009 (aged 72)

Sport
- Sport: Rowing

Manuel Mandel (30 September 1936 – 27 September 2009) was a Brazilian rower. He competed at the 1980 Summer Olympics and the 1984 Summer Olympics.
