= Zigmars Berkolds =

Latvian luger (born 1979)

Medal record

Luge

Representing Latvia

World Championships
Silver medal – second place	2003 Sigulda	Mixed team

Zigmars Berkolds (born 23 July 1979) is a Latvian luger who has competed from 1996 to 2005. He won the silver medal in the mixed team event at the 2003 FIL World Luge Championships in Sigulda, Latvia.
