= Ullrich Dießner =

East German rower

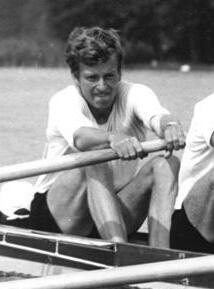
- Dießner in 1982

Personal information
- Born: 27 December 1954 (age 71) Meißen, East Germany
- Height: 1.89 m (6 ft 2 in)
- Weight: 83 kg (183 lb)

Sport
- Sport: Rowing
- Club: SC Einheit Dresden
Medal record
Men's rowing
Representing East Germany
Olympic Games
Gold medal – first place	1980 Moscow	Coxed four
Silver medal – second place	1976 Montreal	Coxed four
Friendship Games
Silver medal – second place	1984 Moscow	Coxless four
World Rowing Championships
Gold medal – first place	1974 Lucerne	Coxed four
Gold medal – first place	1977 Amsterdam	Coxed four
Gold medal – first place	1978 Hamilton	Coxed four
Gold medal – first place	1979 Bled	Coxed four
Gold medal – first place	1982 Lucerne	Coxed four
Gold medal – first place	1983 Dusiburg	Coxed pair
Silver medal – second place	1975 Nottingham	Coxed four

Ullrich Dießner (born 27 December 1954) is a retired German rower who had his best achievements in the coxed fours. In this event he won a silver and a gold medal at the 1976 and 1980 Olympics, respectively, as well as five world titles in 1974, 1977, 1978, 1979 and 1982. For his Olympic achievements Dießner was awarded the Patriotic Order of Merit in 1976 and 1980.

His twin brother Walter rowed together with Ullrich in most competitions until 1981. The brothers have different birth dates because Walter was born before midnight and Ullrich shortly thereafter.
