= Juan Alfonso =

Cuban rower (born 1958)

Personal information
- Full name: Juan Alfonso Armenteros
- Born: 8 February 1958 (age 68) Santo Domingo, Cuba

Sport
- Sport: Rowing
Medal record
Men's rowing
Representing Cuba
Pan American Games
Gold medal – first place	1979 San Juan	Coxed four
Bronze medal – third place	1979 San Juan	Eight

Juan Alfonso Armenteros (born 8 February 1958) is a Cuban rower. He competed in two events at the 1980 Summer Olympics.
