= Žoržs Tikmers =

Latvian rower and sports executive

Olympic medal record

Men's rowing

Representing the Soviet Union
Silver medal – second place	1980 Moscow	Coxed four

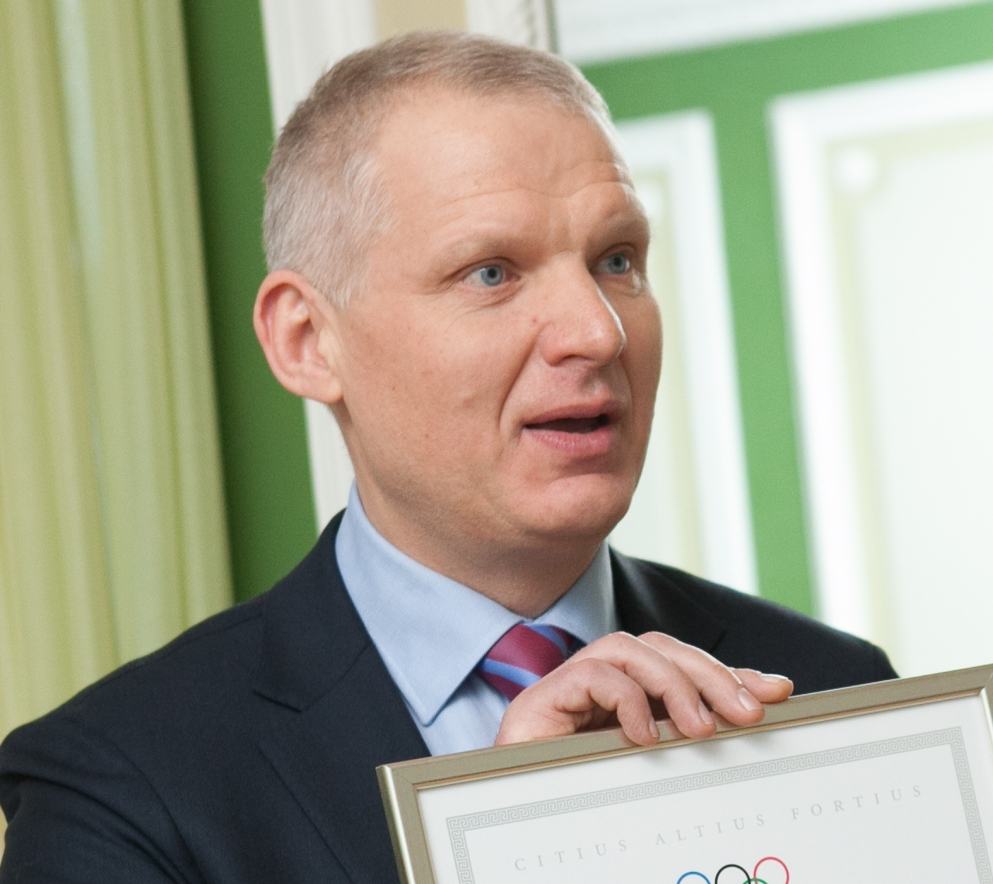
Zorzs Tikmers

Žoržs Tikmers (born 22 January 1957 in Iecava, Latvian SSR) is a Latvian sports executive and former rower who competed for the Soviet Union in the 1980 Summer Olympics.

In 1980 he was a crew member of the Soviet boat which won the silver medal in the coxed fours event.

From 1992 to 2012, he was the vice president of the Latvian Olympic Committee (LOC). From 2012 to 2020, he was the Secretary General of LOC. From 2020 to 2023, he was the President of the Latvian Olympic Committee, but was forced to resign early.

Sporting positions
Preceded by Aldons Vrubļevskis	President of the Latvian Olympic Committee; 2020–2023	Succeeded by Jānis Buks
