= John Roberts (rower) =

British rower

Personal information
- Nationality: English
- Born: 22 December 1953 (age 72)

Sport
- Sport: Rowing
- Club: Thames Tradesmen's RC
Medal record
Men's rowing
Representing Great Britain
World Rowing Championships
Silver medal – second place	1977 Amsterdam 1978 Karipero	Coxless pair

John Roberts (born 22 December 1953) is a retired British rower who competed in the 1980 Summer Olympics. Roberts was part of the coxless pair with Jim Clark that won a silver medal at the 1977 World Rowing Championships in Amsterdam and in Karapiro 1978. At the 1980 Olympic Games he was selected by Great Britain to row in the men's coxed four, the crew finished in seventh place.
