= Noel Graham (rowing) =

Irish rower (born 1944)

Personal information
- Nationality: Irish
- Born: 25 December 1944 (age 81)

Sport
- Sport: Rowing

Noel Graham (born 25 December 1944) is an Irish rower. He competed in the men's coxed four event at the 1980 Summer Olympics.
