= Colin Seymour =

British rower

Personal information
- Nationality: British
- Born: 27 October 1953 (age 71); London

Sport
- Sport: Rowing

Colin Seymour (born 27 October 1953) is a British rower. He competed in the men's coxed four event at the 1980 Summer Olympics. In 1977 he was part of the eight that reached the final and finished 5th, at the 1977 World Rowing Championships in Amsterdam.
