= Iain Kennedy (rower) =

Irish rower

Personal information
- Nationality: Irish
- Born: 4 April 1950 (age 74)

Sport
- Sport: Rowing

Iain Kennedy (born 4 April 1950) is an Irish rower. He competed at the 1976 Summer Olympics and the 1980 Summer Olympics.
