= Georgi Petkov (rower) =

Bulgarian rower

Personal information
- Nationality: Bulgarian
- Born: 8 January 1956 (age 69)

Sport
- Sport: Rowing

Georgi Petkov (Bulgarian: Георги Петков; born 8 January 1956) is a Bulgarian rower. He competed in the men's coxed four event at the 1980 Summer Olympics.
