= Grzegorz Nowak (rower) =

Polish rower (born 1954)

Olympic medal record

Men's rowing
Bronze medal – third place	1980 Moscow	Coxed four

Grzegorz Nowak (born 1 November 1954) is a Polish rower who competed in the 1980 Summer Olympics.

He was born in Luboń.

In 1980 he was a crew member of the Polish boat which won the bronze medal in the coxed fours event. At the same Olympics he also finished ninth with the Polish boat in the 1980 eights competition.
