= Juan Bueno (sport shooter) =

Mexican sports shooter (born 1946)

Personal information
- Born: 6 February 1946 (age 80)

Sport
- Sport: Sports shooting

Juan Bueno (born 6 February 1946) is a Mexican former sports shooter. He competed at the 1972, 1976 and the 1980 Summer Olympics.
