= Sonja Manzenreiter =

Austrian luger

Medal record

Luge

Representing Austria

World Championships
Bronze medal – third place	2003 Sigulda	Mixed team

Sonja Manzenreiter (born 18 July 1975) is an Austrian luger who competed from 1997 to 2006. She won the bronze medal in the mixed team event at the 2003 FIL World Luge Championships in Sigulda, Latvia.

Competing in three Winter Olympics, Manzenreiter also finished seventh in the women's singles event at Salt Lake City in 2002.
