= Aldon Lynn Nielsen =

American poet, and literary critic (born 1950)

Aldon Lynn Nielsen (born in 1950 in Grand Island, Nebraska) is an American poet, and literary critic.

== Life ==
He was raised in the District of Columbia, where he graduated from the Federal City College and from the George Washington University, with a Ph.D. He taught at Howard University, San Jose State University, the University of California, Los Angeles and Loyola Marymount University. He is the George and Barbara Kelly Professor of American Literature in the Pennsylvania State University.

He lives in California with his wife, Anna Everett, an emeritus professor at U.C. Santa Barbara. Nielsen loves to wear hats and owns several tablets.

== Awards ==
- Larry Neal Award for poetry
- Two Gertrude Stein Awards for innovation.
- SAMLA Studies Prize, a Myers Citation and the Kayden Award for best book in the humanities, for Reading Race
- Josephine Miles Award, for Integral Music: Languages of African American Innovation
- American Book Award for Don't deny my name: words and music and the black intellectual tradition
- Darwin Turner Award

== Works ==
=== Poetry ===
- Heat Strings
- Evacuation Routes, Score, 1994
- Stepping Razor. Edge Books. 1997. ISBN 978-0-9619097-9-6.
- VEXT. Sink Press. 1999. ISBN 978-0-9623806-5-5.
- Mixage. Zasterle. 2005. ISBN 978-84-87467-43-1.
- Mantic Semantic. Hank's Loose Gravel Press. 2011.
- A Brand New Beggar. Steerage Press. 2013. ISBN 978-0983632665.
- Tray. Make Now Books. 2017. ISBN 9781942272106.
- You Didn't Hear This from Me. Theenk Books. 2018. ISBN 97809883891-7-5.
- Back Pages: Selected Poems. BlazeVOX Books. 2021. ISBN 978-1609643812.
- Spider Cone. Selva Oscura Press. 2022. ISBN 979-8-9856636-1-7.

=== Criticism ===
- Reading Race: White American Poets and the Racial Discourse in the Twentieth Century. University of Georgia Press. 1990. ISBN 978-0-8203-1273-6. (reprint).
- Black Chant: Languages of African American Posmodernism. Cambridge University Press. 1997. ISBN 978-0-521-55526-5.
- Writing between the Lines: Race and Intertextuality. University of Georgia Press. 1994. ISBN 0-8203-1603-2.
- C.L.R. James: A Critical Introduction. University Press of Mississippi. 2013. ISBN 9781617038464. (reprint)
- Reading Race in American Poetry: An Area of Act. University of Illinois Press. 2000. ISBN 978-0-252-06832-4.
- The Inside Songs of Amiri Baraka. Palgrave. 2021. ISBN 978-3030757571.
- Annie Finch; Kathrine Varnes, eds. (2002). "Oulipian Poetry". An exaltation of forms: contemporary poets celebrate the diversity of their art. University of Michigan Press. p. 385. ISBN 978-0-472-06725-1. "Aldon Lynn Nielsen."
- Integral Music: Languages of African American Innovation. University of Alabama Press. 2004. ISBN 9780817314330.

=== As editor ===
- Lorenzo Thomas (2008). Don't Deny My Name: Words and Music and the Black Intellectual Tradition. University of Michigan Press. ISBN 9780472098927.
- A Spell in the Pokey: The Selected Poems of Hugh Walthall. Selva Oscura Press. 2018. ISBN 9780988937789.
- Aldon Lynn Nielsen; Laura Vrana, eds. (2019). The Collected Poems of Lorenzo Thomas. Wesleyan. ISBN 9780819578983.

=== Anthologies ===
- John Ashbery; David Lehman, eds. (1988). Best American Poems anthology. Macmillan. ISBN 978-0-02-044181-6.
- Aldon Lynn Nielsen; Lauri Ramey, eds. (2006). Every Goodbye Ain't Gone: An Anthology of Innovative Poetry by African Americans. University of Alabama Press. ISBN 978-0-8173-5279-0.
- Aldon Lynn Nielsen; Lauri Ramey, eds. (2015). What I Say: Innovative Poetry by Black Writers in America. University of Alabama Press. ISBN 9780817358006.
