= Hugh Aldons =

Ceylonese cricketer, field hockey player and rugby union player (1925–2024)

- Aldons in the 1950s
- Born: 6 April 1925; British Ceylon
- Died: 27 June 2024 (aged 99); Melbourne, Australia
- Other names: Hugh Cecil Aldons
- Education: Royal College, Colombo
- Occupations: field hockey player, cricketer, rugby union player

Hugh Cecil Aldons (6 April 1925 – 27 June 2024) was a Sri Lankan–Australian sportsman, a triple international who represented Ceylon at three sports in the 1950s: hockey, cricket and rugby union. He captained the national hockey and cricket teams. He migrated to Australia in 1957.

== Sporting career ==
Aldons attended Royal College, Colombo, where he played as an all-rounder in the First XI in the annual cricket match against S. Thomas' College, Mount Lavinia, in 1942, 1943 and 1944. In April 1957, in his only first-class match, he captained the Ceylon team to victory over Madras in the annual Gopalan Trophy match.

Aldons represented Ceylon at hockey from 1947 to 1957. He began his international career in 1947 in field hockey against neighbouring India and also played against heavyweights Pakistan in 1955. He also went onto play against the Indian Army Southern Command in 1950. He was also subsequently selected for tours of Madras and Bangalore in 1953. He also played against the Delhi Wanderers in 1955 and played against Mysore HA in 1955.

He was an attacking right half, who played in domestic hockey competitions for Burgher Recreation Club and was subsequently part of Burgher Recreation Club's title winning campaigns in domestic competitions from 1948 to 1950. He captained the national hockey team in 1957. He captained Mercantile H.A. at the first National Hockey Championships in 1956 and 1957, when Mercantile H.A. were champions both times. He featured in his last match for Burgher Recreation Club against University in 1957 during the final of the 'Pioneer Cup' Knockout Tournament. Aldons scored the only goal in the final, so his team won the tournament.

In rugby union, Aldons played domestically as a right wing three-quarter for Havelock Sports Club. After they won the Clifford Cup he was selected to play for Ceylon.

== Later life and death ==
The day after Aldons played in Burgher Recreation Club's victory in the 1957 Pioneer Cup hockey tournament, he and his wife Ione and their children migrated to Australia, settling in the south-eastern suburbs of Melbourne. Shortly after arriving, they helped to found the Australia-Ceylon Fellowship.

Aldons died in Melbourne on 27 June 2024, aged 99.
