= Pēteris Skudra =

Latvian ice hockey player

- Born: April 24, 1973 (age 52) Riga, Latvian SSR, Soviet Union
- Height: 6 ft 1 in (185 cm)
- Weight: 183 lb (83 kg; 13 st 1 lb)
- Position: Goaltender
- Caught: Left
- Played for: Pittsburgh Penguins; Buffalo Sabres; Boston Bruins; Vancouver Canucks; Ak Bars Kazan; Khimik Moscow Oblast; CSKA Moscow; Metallurg Novokuznetsk
- National team: Latvia
- NHL draft: Undrafted
- Playing career: 1994–2007

Pēteris "Peter" Skudra (born April 24, 1973) is a Latvian former professional ice hockey goaltender and head coach. During a playing career that lasted from 1994 to 2007 he played for several teams in Latvia, Russia and North America. After starting his career in Latvia, Skudra moved to the North American minor leagues in 1994. He signed with the Pittsburgh Penguins of the National Hockey League (NHL) in 1997 and made his debut that year. Over the next six seasons, Skudra played for the Penguins, Buffalo Sabres, Boston Bruins, and Vancouver Canucks. In 2003, he moved to Russia, playing the last four seasons of his career. Playing in the NHL primarily as a back-up goalie, Skudra appeared in 146 games during his career.

== Playing career ==
Originally signed as a free agent by Pittsburgh in 1997, Skudra went on to play 74 games with the Penguins over three years. After the 1999–2000 season, he was signed by the Boston Bruins. After playing for the Bruins in 2000–01 season, he was signed by the Vancouver Canucks as a backup to Dan Cloutier. Towards the end of the 2002–03 season, Skudra fell out of favor with coach Marc Crawford who instead decided to have Alex Auld backup Dan Cloutier for that season's playoffs.

In 2003, Skudra left North America for the Russian League, where he played for Ak Bars Kazan, Khimik Moscow Oblast, CSKA Moscow, and Metallurg Novokuznetsk. On October 22, 2007, Skudra announced his retirement after 13 professional seasons.

== Coaching career ==
In April 2013, Skudra was announced as the new head coach of Russian club, Torpedo Nizhniy Novgorod of the KHL. He spent five seasons with the team. He also briefly coached Traktor Chelyabinsk in 2019.

On 20 July 2020, Skudra was introduced in a dual general manager and head coaching role with Latvian KHL club, Dinamo Riga.

== Roller hockey ==
Skudra also played one season in the Roller Hockey International league for the Oklahoma Coyotes.

== Career statistics ==
=== Regular season and playoffs ===
			Regular season									Playoffs
Season	Team	League	GP	W	L	T/OT	MIN	GA	SO	GAA	SV%	GP	W	L	MIN	GA	SO	GAA	SV%
1990–91	RASMS Riga	USSR-3	1	—	—	—	—	—	—	—	—	—	—	—	—	—	—	—	—
1991–92	RASMS Riga	USSR-3	33	—	—	—	—	—	—	—	—	—	—	—	—	—	—	—	—
1992–93	Pardaugava Riga	RUS	27	—	—	—	1498	74	—	2.96	—	1	—	—	60	5	0	5.00	—
1992–93	Pardaugava Riga	LAT	12	—	—	—	—	—	—	—	—	—	—	—	—	—	—	—	—
1993–94	Pardaugava Riga	RUS	14	—	—	—	783	42	—	3.22	—	1	—	—	55	4	4.36	0	—
1993–94	Hokeja Centrs Riga	LAT	3	—	—	—	—	—	—	—	—	—	—	—	—	—	—	—	—
1994–95	Greensboro Monarchs	ECHL	33	13	9	5	1612	113	0	4.20	.869	6	2	2	341	28	0	4.92	.872
1994–95	Mississippi RiverKings	CHL	2	0	1	0	80	8	0	6.00	.830	—	—	—	—	—	—	—	—
1995–96	Erie Panthers	ECHL	12	3	8	1	681	47	0	4.14	.871	—	—	—	—	—	—	—	—
1995–96	Johnstown Chiefs	ECHL	30	12	11	4	1657	98	0	3.55	.908	—	—	—	—	—	—	—	—
1996–97	Hamilton Bulldogs	AHL	32	8	16	2	1615	101	0	3.75	.889	—	—	—	—	—	—	—	—
1996–97	Johnstown Chiefs	ECHL	4	2	1	1	200	11	0	3.30	.910	—	—	—	—	—	—	—	—
1997–98	Pittsburgh Penguins	NHL	17	6	4	3	851	26	0	1.83	.924	—	—	—	—	—	—	—	—
1997–98	Houston Aeros	IHL	9	5	3	1	499	23	0	2.77	.903	—	—	—	—	—	—	—	—
1997–98	Kansas City Blades	IHL	13	10	3	0	775	37	0	2.86	.910	8	4	4	512	20	1	2.34	.922
1998–99	Pittsburgh Penguins	NHL	37	15	11	5	1914	89	3	2.79	.892	—	—	—	—	—	—	—	—
1999–00	Pittsburgh Penguins	NHL	20	5	7	3	922	48	1	3.12	.872	1	0	0	20	1	0	3.00	.909
2000–01	Buffalo Sabres	NHL	1	0	0	0	1	0	0	0.00	1.000	—	—	—	—	—	—	—	—
2000–01	Boston Bruins	NHL	25	6	12	1	1116	62	0	3.33	.879	—	—	—	—	—	—	—	—
2000–01	Providence Bruins	AHL	3	3	0	0	180	5	0	1.67	.933	—	—	—	—	—	—	—	—
2001–02	Vancouver Canucks	NHL	23	10	8	2	1166	47	1	2.42	.907	2	0	1	96	5	0	3.13	.891
2002–03	Vancouver Canucks	NHL	23	9	5	6	1192	54	1	2.72	.897	—	—	—	—	—	—	—	—
2002–03	Manitoba Moose	AHL	1	1	0	0	60	3	0	3.00	.906	—	—	—	—	—	—	—	—
2003–04	Ak Bars Kazan	RUS	9	—	—	—	545	20	0	2.20	.884	—	—	—	—	—	—	—	—
2003–04	Khimik Voskresensk	RUS	34	—	—	—	2045	59	6	1.73	.935	—	—	—	—	—	—	—	—
2004–05	Khimik Voskresensk	RUS	42	—	—	—	2339	97	3	2.49	.908	—	—	—	—	—	—	—	—
2005–06	CSKA Moscow	RUS	24	—	—	—	—	—	—	2.24	.919	7	—	—	—	—	—	2.76	.897
2006–07	CSKA Moscow	RUS	19	—	—	—	—	—	—	2.93	.899	—	—	—	—	—	—	—	—
2006–07	Metallurg Novokuznetsk	RUS	13	—	—	—	—	—	—	2.00	.920	2	—	—	—	—	—	5.50	.823
NHL totals			146	51	47	20	7163	326	6	2.73	.894	3	0	1	116	6	0	3.10	.895

=== International ===
Year	Team	Event	GP	W	L	T	MIN	GA	SO	GAA	SV%
1991	Soviet Union	EJC	3	—	—	—	—	—	—	1.02	—
1993	Latvia	WC-C	2	1	0	0	81	0	1	0.00	1.000
1997	Latvia	WC	1	0	0	0	25	3	0	7.16	—
Junior totals			3	—	—	—	—	—	—	1.02	—
Senior totals			3	1	0	0	106	3	1	1.69	—
