= Juan Bueno (rower) =

Cuban rower (born 1957)

Personal information
- Nationality: Cuban
- Born: 10 October 1957 (age 67)

Sport
- Sport: Rowing

Juan Bueno (born 10 October 1957) is a Cuban rower. He competed in two events at the 1980 Summer Olympics.
