= List of 1980 Summer Olympics medal winners =

The 1980 Summer Olympics were held in Soviet Union from 19 July to 3 August 1980.

== Archery ==
=== Medal table ===
Rank	Nation	Gold	Silver	Bronze	Total
1	Soviet Union*	1	2	0	3
2	Finland	1	0	1	2
3	Italy	0	0	1	1
Totals (3 entries)		2	2	2	6

=== Medalists ===
Event	Gold	Silver	Bronze
Men's	Tomi Poikolainen; Finland	Boris Isachenko; Soviet Union	Giancarlo Ferrari; Italy
Women's	Keto Losaberidze; Soviet Union	Natalya Butuzova; Soviet Union	Päivi Meriluoto; Finland

== Athletics ==
=== Medal table ===
Rank	Nation	Gold	Silver	Bronze	Total
1	Soviet Union*	15	14	12	41
2	East Germany	11	8	10	29
3	Great Britain	4	2	4	10
4	Italy	3	0	1	4
5	Poland	2	4	1	7
6	Ethiopia	2	0	2	4
7	Cuba	1	2	1	4
8	Czechoslovakia	0	2	0	2
8	Tanzania	0	2	0	2
10	Bulgaria	0	1	1	2
10	Finland	0	1	1	2
12	Australia	0	1	0	1
12	Netherlands	0	1	0	1
12	Spain	0	1	0	1
15	Jamaica	0	0	2	2
16	Brazil	0	0	1	1
16	France	0	0	1	1
Totals (17 entries)		38	39	37	114

=== Men's events ===
Games	Gold		Silver		Bronze	
100 metres	Allan Wells; Great Britain	10.25	Silvio Leonard; Cuba	10.25	Petar Petrov; Bulgaria	10.39
200 metres	Pietro Mennea; Italy	20.19	Allan Wells; Great Britain	20.21	Don Quarrie; Jamaica	20.29
400 metres	Viktor Markin; Soviet Union	44.60	Rick Mitchell; Australia	44.84	Frank Schaffer; East Germany	44.87
800 metres	Steve Ovett; Great Britain	1:45.40	Sebastian Coe; Great Britain	1:45.85	Nikolay Kirov; Soviet Union	1:45.94
1500 metres	Sebastian Coe; Great Britain	3:38.40	Jürgen Straub; East Germany	3:38.80	Steve Ovett; Great Britain	3:38.99
5000 metres	Miruts Yifter; Ethiopia	13:20.91	Suleiman Nyambui; Tanzania	13:21.60	Kaarlo Maaninka; Finland	13:22.00
10,000 metres	Miruts Yifter; Ethiopia	27:42.69	Kaarlo Maaninka; Finland	27:44.28	Mohamed Kedir; Ethiopia	27:44.64
110 metres hurdles	Thomas Munkelt; East Germany	13.39	Alejandro Casañas; Cuba	13.40	Aleksandr Puchkov; Soviet Union	13.44
400 metres hurdles	Volker Beck; East Germany	48.70	Vasyl Arkhypenko; Soviet Union	48.86	Gary Oakes; Great Britain	49.11
3000 metres steeplechase	Bronisław Malinowski; Poland	8:09.70	Filbert Bayi; Tanzania	8:12.48	Eshetu Tura; Ethiopia	8:13.57
4 × 100 metres relay	Soviet Union; Vladimir Muravyov; Nikolay Sidorov; Andrey Prokofyev; Aleksandr Aksinin	38.26	Poland; Zenon Licznerski; Leszek Dunecki; Marian Woronin; Krzysztof Zwoliński	38.33	France; Patrick Barré; Pascal Barré; Hermann Panzo; Antoine Richard	38.53
4 × 400 metres relay	Soviet Union; Viktor Markin; Remigijus Valiulis; Mikhail Linge; Nikolay Chernetskiy	3:01.08	East Germany; Klaus Thiele; Andreas Knebel; Frank Schaffer; Volker Beck	3:01.26	Italy; Roberto Tozzi; Mauro Zuliani; Stefano Malinverni; Pietro Mennea	3:04.54
Marathon	Waldemar Cierpinski; East Germany	2:11:03	Gerard Nijboer; Netherlands	2:11:20	Satymkul Dzhumanazarov; Soviet Union	2:11:35
20 kilometres walk	Maurizio Damilano; Italy	1:23:35.5 OR	Pyotr Pochynchuk; Soviet Union	1:24:45.4	Roland Wieser; East Germany	1:25:58.2
50 kilometres walk	Hartwig Gauder; East Germany	3:49.24 OR	Jorge Llopart; Spain	3:51.25	Yevgeniy Ivchenko; Soviet Union	3:56.32
High jump	Gerd Wessig; East Germany	2.36 m WR	Jacek Wszoła; Poland	2.31 m	Jörg Freimuth; East Germany	2.31 m
Pole vault	Władysław Kozakiewicz; Poland	5.78 m WR	Konstantin Volkov; Soviet Union; Tadeusz Ślusarski; Poland	5.65 m	none	--
Long jump	Lutz Dombrowski; East Germany	8.54 m	Frank Paschek; East Germany	8.21 m	Valeriy Pidluzhny; Soviet Union	8.18 m
Triple jump	Jaak Uudmäe; Soviet Union	17.35 m	Viktor Saneyev; Soviet Union	17.24 m	João Carlos de Oliveira; Brazil	17.22 m
Shot put	Vladimir Kiselyov; Soviet Union	21.35 m OR	Aleksandr Baryshnikov; Soviet Union	21.08 m	Udo Beyer; East Germany	21.06 m
Discus throw	Viktor Rashchupkin; Soviet Union	66.64 m	Imrich Bugár; Czechoslovakia	66.38 m	Luis Delís; Cuba	66.32 m
Hammer throw	Yuriy Sedykh; Soviet Union	81.80 m WR	Sergey Litvinov; Soviet Union	80.64 m	Jüri Tamm; Soviet Union	78.96 m
Javelin throw	Dainis Kūla; Soviet Union	91.20 m	Aleksandr Makarov; Soviet Union	89.64 m	Wolfgang Hanisch; East Germany	86.72 m
Decathlon	Daley Thompson; Great Britain	8495	Yuriy Kutsenko; Soviet Union	8331	Sergey Zhelanov; Soviet Union	8135

=== Women's events ===
Games	Gold		Silver		Bronze	
100 metres	Lyudmila Kondratyeva; Soviet Union	11.06	Marlies Göhr; East Germany	11.07	Ingrid Auerswald; East Germany	11.14
200 metres	Bärbel Wöckel; East Germany	22.03 OR	Natalya Bochina; Soviet Union	22.19	Merlene Ottey; Jamaica	22.20
400 metres	Marita Koch; East Germany	48.88 OR	Jarmila Kratochvílová; Czechoslovakia	49.46	Christina Lathan; East Germany	49.66
800 metres	Nadezhda Olizarenko; Soviet Union	1:53.43 WR	Olga Mineyeva; Soviet Union	1:54.81	Tatyana Providokhina; Soviet Union	1:55.46
1500 metres	Tatyana Kazankina; Soviet Union	3:56.56 OR	Christiane Wartenberg; East Germany	3:57.71	Nadezhda Olizarenko; Soviet Union	3:59.52
100 metres hurdles	Vera Komisova; Soviet Union	12.56 OR	Johanna Klier; East Germany	12.63	Lucyna Langer; Poland	12.65
4 × 100 metres relay	East Germany; Romy Müller; Bärbel Wöckel; Ingrid Auerswald; Marlies Göhr	41.60 WR	Soviet Union; Vera Komisova; Lyudmila Maslakova; Vera Anisimova; Natalya Bochina	42.10	Great Britain; Heather Hunte; Kathy Smallwood; Beverley Goddard; Sonia Lannaman	42.43
4 × 400 metres relay	Soviet Union; Tatyana Prorochenko; Tatyana Goyshchik; Nina Zyuskova; Irina Nazarova	3:20.12	East Germany; Barbara Krug; Gabriele Löwe; Christina Lathan; Marita Koch	3:20.35	Great Britain; Linsey MacDonald; Michelle Probert; Joslyn Hoyte-Smith; Donna Hartley	3:27.74
High jump	Sara Simeoni; Italy	1.97 m OR	Urszula Kielan; Poland	1.94 m	Jutta Kirst; East Germany	1.94 m
Long jump	Tatyana Kolpakova; Soviet Union	7.06 m	Brigitte Wujak; East Germany	7.04 m	Tetyana Skachko; Soviet Union	7.01 m
Shot put	Ilona Slupianek; East Germany	22.41 m OR	Svetlana Krachevskaya; Soviet Union	21.42 m	Margitta Pufe; East Germany	21.20 m
Discus throw	Evelin Jahl; East Germany	69.96 m OR	Mariya Petkova; Bulgaria	67.90 m	Tatyana Lesovaya; Soviet Union	67.40 m
Javelin throw	María Caridad Colón; Cuba	68.40 m OR	Saida Gunba; Soviet Union	67.76 m	Ute Hommola; East Germany	66.56 m
Pentathlon	Nadiya Tkachenko; Soviet Union	5083 WR	Olga Rukavishnikova; Soviet Union	4937	Olga Kuragina; Soviet Union	4875

== Basketball ==
=== Medal table ===
* Host nation (Soviet Union)

Rank	NOC	Gold	Silver	Bronze	Total
1	Soviet Union*	1	0	1	2
1	Yugoslavia	1	0	1	2
3	Bulgaria	0	1	0	1
3	Italy	0	1	0	1
Totals (4 entries)		2	2	2	6

=== Medalists ===
Event	Gold	Silver	Bronze
Men	Yugoslavia; Andro Knego; Dragan Kićanović; Rajko Žižić; Mihovil Nakić; Željko Jerkov; Branko Skroče; Zoran Slavnić; Krešimir Ćosić; Ratko Radovanović; Duje Krstulović; Dražen Dalipagić; Mirza Delibašić	Italy; Fabrizio Della Fiori; Marco Solfrini; Marco Bonamico; Dino Meneghin; Renato Villalta; Renzo Vecchiato; Pierluigi Marzorati; Pietro Generali; Romeo Sacchetti; Roberto Brunamonti; Michael Sylvester; Enrico Gilardi	Soviet Union; Stanislav Yeryomin; Valeri Miloserdov; Sergei Tarakanov; Aleksandr Salnikov; Andrey Lopatov; Nikolai Deriugin; Sergei Belov; Vladimir Tkachenko; Anatoly Myshkin; Sergejus Jovaiša; Aleksandr Belostenny; Vladimir Zhigily
Women	Soviet Union; Olga Barysheva; Tatyana Ivinskaya; Nelli Feryabnikova; Vida Beselienė; Tatyana Ovechkina; Angelė Rupšienė; Lyubov Sharmay; Uljana Semjonova; Tetiana Nadyrova; Olga Sukharnova; Nadezhda Shuvayeva-Olkhova; Lyudmila Rogozhina	Bulgaria; Krasimira Bogdanova; Vanya Dermendzhieva; Silviya Germanova; Petkana Makaveeva; Nadka Golcheva; Penka Stoyanova; Evladiya Slavcheva; Kostadinka Radkova; Snezhana Mikhaylova; Angelina Mikhaylova; Penka Metodieva; Diana Dilova	Yugoslavia; Vera Đurašković; Mersada Bećirspahić; Jelica Komnenović; Mira Bjedov; Vukica Mitić; Sanja Ožegović; Sofija Pekić; Marija Tonković; Zorica Đurković; Vesna Despotović; Biljana Majstorović; Jasmina Perazić

== Boxing ==
=== Medal table ===
* Host nation (Soviet Union)

Rank	Nation	Gold	Silver	Bronze	Total
1	Cuba	6	2	2	10
2	Soviet Union*	1	6	1	8
3	East Germany	1	0	5	6
4	Bulgaria	1	0	1	2
5	Italy	1	0	0	1
5	Yugoslavia	1	0	0	1
7	Poland	0	1	4	5
8	Uganda	0	1	0	1
8	Venezuela	0	1	0	1
10	Hungary	0	0	2	2
10	Romania	0	0	2	2
12	Czechoslovakia	0	0	1	1
12	Great Britain	0	0	1	1
12	Guyana	0	0	1	1
12	Ireland	0	0	1	1
12	North Korea	0	0	1	1
Totals (16 entries)		11	11	22	44

=== Medalists ===
Event	Gold	Silver	Bronze
Light flyweight (48kg)	Shamil Sabirov; Soviet Union	Hipólito Ramos; Cuba	Lee Byong-Uk; North Korea Ismail Mustafov; Bulgaria
Flyweight (51kg)	Petar Lesov; Bulgaria	Viktor Miroshnichenko; Soviet Union	Hugh Russell; Ireland János Váradi; Hungary
Bantamweight (54kg)	Juan Bautista Hernández Pérez; Cuba	Bernardo Pinango; Venezuela	Michael Anthony; Guyana Dumitru Cipere; Romania
Featherweight (57kg)	Rudi Fink; East Germany	Adolfo Horta; Cuba	Viktor Rybakov; Soviet Union Krzysztof Kosedowski; Poland
Lightweight (60kg)	Ángel Herrera; Cuba	Viktor Demyanenko; Soviet Union	Kazimierz Adach; Poland Richard Nowakowski; East Germany
Light welterweight (63.5kg)	Patrizio Oliva; Italy	Serik Konakbayev; Soviet Union	Tony Willis; Great Britain José Aguilar; Cuba
Welterweight (67kg)	Andrés Aldama; Cuba	John Mugabi; Uganda	Karl-Heinz Krüger; East Germany Kazimierz Szczerba; Poland
Light middleweight (71kg)	Armando Martínez; Cuba	Aleksandr Koshkyn; Soviet Union	Ján Franek; Czechoslovakia Detlef Kästner; East Germany
Middleweight (75kg)	José Gómez Mustelier; Cuba	Viktor Savchenko; Soviet Union	Valentin Silaghi; Romania Jerzy Rybicki; Poland
Light heavyweight (81kg)	Slobodan Kačar; Yugoslavia	Paweł Skrzecz; Poland	Herbert Bauch; East Germany Ricardo Rojas; Cuba
Heavyweight (+81kg)	Teófilo Stevenson; Cuba	Pyotr Zayev; Soviet Union	István Lévai; Hungary Jürgen Fanghänel; East Germany

== Canoeing ==
=== Medal table ===
Rank	Nation	Gold	Silver	Bronze	Total
1	Soviet Union*	4	2	2	8
2	East Germany	4	1	3	8
3	Bulgaria	1	2	2	5
3	Romania	1	2	2	5
5	Hungary	1	1	1	3
6	Spain	0	1	1	2
7	Australia	0	1	0	1
7	France	0	1	0	1
Totals (8 entries)		11	11	11	33

=== Men's events ===
Games	Gold	Silver	Bronze
C-1 500 metres	Sergei Postrekhin; Soviet Union	Lyubomir Lyubenov; Bulgaria	Olaf Heukrodt; East Germany
C-1 1000 metres	Lyubomir Lyubenov; Bulgaria	Sergei Postrekhin; Soviet Union	Eckhard Leue; East Germany
C-2 500 metres	László Foltán; István Vaskúti; Hungary	Ivan Patzaichin; Petre Capusta; Romania	Borislav Ananiev; Nikolai Ilkov; Bulgaria
C-2 1000 metres	Ivan Patzaichin; Toma Simionov; Romania	Olaf Heukrodt; Uwe Madeja; East Germany	Vasyl Yurchenko; Yuri Lobanov; Soviet Union
K-1 500 metres	Vladimir Parfenovich; Soviet Union	John Sumegi; Australia	Vasile Dîba; Romania
K-1 1000 metres	Rüdiger Helm; East Germany	Alain Lebas; France	Ion Bîrlădeanu; Romania
K-2 500 metres	Vladimir Parfenovich; Sergei Chukhray; Soviet Union	Herminio Menéndez; Guillermo del Riego; Spain	Rüdiger Helm; Bernd Olbricht; East Germany
K-2 1000 metres	Vladimir Parfenovich; Sergei Chukhray; Soviet Union	István Szabó; István Joós; Hungary	Luis Gregorio Ramos; Herminio Menéndez; Spain
K-4 1000 metres	East Germany; Rüdiger Helm; Bernd Olbricht; Harald Marg; Bernd Duvigneau	Romania; Mihai Zafiu; Vasile Dîba; Ion Geantă; Nicuşor Eşanu	Bulgaria; Borislav Borisov; Bozhidar Milenkov; Lazar Khristov; Ivan Manev

=== Women's events ===
Games	Gold	Silver	Bronze
K-1 500 metres	Birgit Fischer; East Germany	Vanja Gesheva; Bulgaria	Antonina Melnikova; Soviet Union
K-2 500 metres	Carsta Genäuß; Martina Bischof; East Germany	Galina Alexeyeva; Nina Trofimova; Soviet Union	Éva Rakusz; Mária Zakariás; Hungary

== Cycling ==
=== Medal table ===
Rank	Nation	Gold	Silver	Bronze	Total
1	Soviet Union*	3	1	2	6
2	East Germany	2	2	0	4
3	Switzerland	1	0	0	1
4	France	0	2	0	2
5	Poland	0	1	0	1
6	Czechoslovakia	0	0	2	2
7	Denmark	0	0	1	1
7	Jamaica	0	0	1	1
Totals (8 entries)		6	6	6	18

=== Road cycling ===
Event	Gold	Silver	Bronze
Individual road race	Sergei Sukhoruchenkov; Soviet Union	Czesław Lang; Poland	Yuri Barinov; Soviet Union
Team time trial	Soviet Union; Yury Kashirin; Oleg Logvin; Sergei Shelpakov; Anatoly Yarkin	East Germany; Falk Boden; Bernd Drogan; Olaf Ludwig; Hans-Joachim Hartnick	Czechoslovakia; Michal Klasa; Vlastibor Konečný; Alipi Kostadinov; Jiří Škoda

=== Track cycling ===
Event	Gold	Silver	Bronze
Individual pursuit	Robert Dill-Bundi; Switzerland	Alain Bondue; France	Hans-Henrik Ørsted; Denmark
Team pursuit	Soviet Union; Viktor Manakov; Valery Movchan; Vladimir Osokin; Vitaly Petrakov; Aleksandr Krasnov	East Germany; Gerald Mortag; Uwe Unterwalder; Matthias Wiegand; Volker Winkler	Czechoslovakia; Teodor Černý; Martin Penc; Jiří Pokorný; Igor Sláma
Sprint	Lutz Heßlich; East Germany	Yavé Cahard; France	Sergei Kopylov; Soviet Union
1 km time trial	Lothar Thoms; East Germany	Aleksandr Panfilov; Soviet Union	David Weller; Jamaica

== Diving ==
=== Medal table ===
Rank	Nation	Gold	Silver	Bronze	Total
1	Soviet Union*	2	2	2	6
2	East Germany	2	1	1	4
3	Mexico	0	1	0	1
4	Italy	0	0	1	1
Totals (4 entries)		4	4	4	12

=== Men's events ===
Event	Gold	Silver	Bronze
3 m springboard	Aleksandr Portnov; Soviet Union	Carlos Girón; Mexico	Giorgio Cagnotto; Italy
10 m platform	Falk Hoffmann; East Germany	Vladimir Aleynik; Soviet Union	David Ambartsumyan; Soviet Union

=== Women's events ===
Event	Gold	Silver	Bronze
3 m springboard	Irina Kalinina; Soviet Union	Martina Proeber; East Germany	Karin Guthke; East Germany
10 m platform	Martina Jäschke; East Germany	Sirvard Emirzyan; Soviet Union	Liana Tsotadze; Soviet Union

== Equestrian events ==
=== Medal table ===
Rank	Nation	Gold	Silver	Bronze	Total
1	Soviet Union*	3	3	2	8
2	Italy	1	1	0	2
2	Poland	1	1	0	2
4	Austria	1	0	0	1
5	Bulgaria	0	1	0	1
6	Mexico	0	0	3	3
7	Romania	0	0	1	1
Totals (7 entries)		6	6	6	18

=== Medalists ===
Games	Gold	Silver	Bronze
Individual dressage	Elisabeth Theurer on Mon Cherie (AUT)	Yuri Kovshov on Igrok (URS)	Viktor Ugryumov on Shkval (URS)
Team dressage	Soviet Union; Yuri Kovshov and Igrok; Viktor Ugryumov and Shkfval; Vera Misevich and Plot	Bulgaria; Petar Mandajiev and Stchibor; Svetoslav lvanov and Aleko; Gheorghi Gadjev and Vnimatelen	Romania; Anghelache Donescu and Dor; Dumitru Veliku and Decebal; Petre Rosca and Derbist
Individual eventing	Federico Roman on Rossinan (ITA)	Aleksandr Blinov on Galzun (URS)	Yuri Salnikov on Pintset (URS)
Team eventing	Soviet Union; Aleksandr Blinov and Galzun; Yuri Salnikov and Pintset; Valery Volkov and Tskheti; Sergei Rogozhin and Gelespont	Italy; Federico Roman and Rossinan; Anna Casagrande and Daleye; Mauro Roman and Dourakine 4 Marina Sciocchetti and Rohan de Lechereo	Mexico; Manuel Mendívil and Remember; David Bárcena and Bombon; José Luis Pérez Soto and Quelite; Fabián Vázquez and Cocaleco
Individual jumping	Jan Kowalczyk on Artemor (POL)	Nikolai Korolkov on Espadron (URS)	Joaquin Perez Heras on Alymony (MEX)
Team jumping	Soviet Union; Vyacheslav Chukanov and Gepatit; Viktor Poganovsky and Topky; Viktor Asmaev and Reis; Nikolai Korolkov and Espadron	Poland; Marian Kozicki and Bremen; Jan Kowalczyk and Artemor; Wiesław Hartman and Norton; Janusz Bobik and Szampan	Mexico; Joaquín Pérez and Alymony; Jesús Gómez and Massacre; Gerardo Tazzer and Caribe; Alberto Valdes Jr. and Lady Mirka

== Fencing ==
=== Medal table ===
Rank	Nation	Gold	Silver	Bronze	Total
1	France	4	1	1	6
2	Soviet Union*	3	3	2	8
3	Sweden	1	0	0	1
4	Hungary	0	2	3	5
5	Poland	0	1	2	3
6	Italy	0	1	0	1
Totals (6 entries)		8	8	8	24

=== Men's events ===
Games	Gold	Silver	Bronze
Individual épée	Johan Harmenberg; Sweden	Ernõ Kolczonay; Hungary	Philippe Riboud; France
Team épée	France; Philippe Riboud; Patrick Picot; Hubert Gardas; Philippe Boisse; Michel Salesse	Poland; Piotr Jabłkowski; Andrzej Lis; Leszek Swornowski; Ludomir Chronowski; Mariusz Strzałka	Soviet Union; Ashot Karagian; Boris Lukomsky; Aleksander Abushackmetov; Aleksander Mozhaev; Vladimir Smirnov
Individual foil	Vladimir Smirnov; Soviet Union	Pascal Jolyot; France	Aleksander Romankov; Soviet Union
Team foil	France; Didier Flament; Pascal Jolyot; Bruno Boscherie; Philippe Bonnin; Frederic Pietruszka	Soviet Union; Aleksander Romankov; Vladimir Smirnov; Sabirzhan Ruziev; Ashot Karagian; Vladimir Lapitsky	Poland; Adam Robak; Bogusław Zych; Lech Koziejowski; Marian Sypniewski
Individual sabre	Viktor Krovopuskov; Soviet Union	Mikhail Burtsev; Soviet Union	Imre Gedővári; Hungary
Team sabre	Soviet Union; Mikhail Burtsev; Viktor Krovopuskov; Viktor Sidjak; Vladimir Nazlymov; Nikolay Alyokhin	Italy; Michele Maffei; Mario Aldo Montano; Marco Romano; Ferdinando Meglio; Giovanni Scalzo	Hungary; Imre Gedővári; Rudolf Nébald; Pál Gerevich; Ferenc Hammang; György Nébald

=== Women's events ===
Games	Gold	Silver	Bronze
Individual foil	Pascale Trinquet; France	Magda Maros; Hungary	Barbara Wysoczańska; Poland
Team foil	France; Brigitte Latrille-Gaudin; Pascale Trinquet; Isabelle Begard; Veronique Brouquier; Christine Muzio	Soviet Union; Valentina Sidorova; Nailia Giliazova; Elena Belova; Irina Ushakova; Larisa Tsagaraeva	Hungary; Ildikó Schwarczenberger; Magda Maros; Gertrúd Stefanek; Zsuzsanna Szőcs; Edit Kovács

== Field hockey ==
=== Medal table ===
* Host nation (Soviet Union)

Rank	Nation	Gold	Silver	Bronze	Total
1	India	1	0	0	1
1	Zimbabwe	1	0	0	1
3	Czechoslovakia	0	1	0	1
3	Spain	0	1	0	1
5	Soviet Union*	0	0	2	2
Totals (5 entries)		2	2	2	6

=== Medalists ===
Event	Gold	Silver	Bronze
Men	India; Vasudevan Baskaran; Bir Bhadur Chettri; Sylvanus Dung Dung; Merwyn Fernandes; Zafar Iqbal; Maharaj Krishan Kaushik; Charanjit Kumar; Maneyapanda Muthanna Somaya; Allan Schofield; Mohamed Shahid; Davinder Singh; Gurmail Singh; Amarjit Singh Rana; Rajinder Singh; Ravinder Pal Singh; Surinder Singh Sodhi	Spain; Juan Amat; Juan Arbós; Jaime Arbós; Javier Cabot; Ricardo Cabot; Miguel Chaves; Juan Coghen; Miguel de Paz; Francisco Fábregas; José Garcia; Rafael Garralda; Santiago Malgosa; Paulino Monsalve; Juan Pellón; Carlos Roca; Jaime Zumalacárregui	Soviet Union; Sos Hayrapetyan; Minneula Azizov; Valeri Belyakov; Viktor Deputatov; Aleksandr Goncharov; Aleksandr Gusev; Sergei Klevtsov; Viacheslav Lampeev; Aleksandr Miasnikov; Mikhail Nichepurenko; Leonid Pavlovski; Sergei Pleshakov; Vladimir Pleshakov; Aleksandr Sychyov; Oleg Zagorodnev; Farit Zigangirov
Women	Zimbabwe; Arlene Boxhall; Liz Chase; Sandra Chick; Gillian Cowley; Patricia Davies; Sarah English; Maureen George; Ann Grant; Susan Huggett; Patricia McKillop; Brenda Phillips; Christine Prinsloo; Sonia Robertson; Anthea Stewart; Helen Volk; Linda Watson	Czechoslovakia; Milada Blažková; Jiřina Čermáková; Jiřina Hájková; Berta Hrubá; Ida Hubáčková; Jiřina Kadlecová; Jarmila Králíčková; Jiřina Křížová; Alena Kyselicová; Jana Lahodová; Květa Petříčková; Viera Podhányiová; Iveta Šranková; Marie Sýkorová; Marta Urbanová; Lenka Vymazalová	Soviet Union; Liailia Akhmerova; Natalia Buzunova; Natalia Bykova; Tatiana Embakhtova; Nadezhda Filippova; Liudmila Frolova; Lidia Glubokova; Nelli Gorbatkova; Elena Guryeva; Galina Inzhuvatova; Alina Kham; Natella Krasnikova; Nadezhda Ovechkina; Tatiana Shvyganova; Galina Viuzhanina; Valentina Zazdravnykh

== Football ==
=== Medal table ===
* Host nation (Soviet Union)

Rank	Nation	Gold	Silver	Bronze	Total
1	Czechoslovakia	1	0	0	1
2	East Germany	0	1	0	1
3	Soviet Union*	0	0	1	1
Totals (3 entries)		1	1	1	3

=== Medalists ===
Event	Gold	Silver	Bronze
Men	Czechoslovakia; Stanislav Seman; Luděk Macela; Josef Mazura; Libor Radimec; Zdeněk Rygel; Petr Němec; Ladislav Vízek; Jan Berger; Jindřich Svoboda; Lubomír Pokluda; Werner Lička; Rostislav Václavíček; Jaroslav Netolička; Oldřich Rott; Zdeněk Šreiner; František Štambacher; František Kunzo	East Germany; Bodo Rudwaleit; Artur Ullrich; Lothar Hause; Frank Uhlig; Frank Baum; Rüdiger Schnuphase; Frank Terletzki; Wolfgang Steinbach; Jürgen Bähringer; Werner Peter; Dieter Kühn; Norbert Trieloff; Matthias Müller; Matthias Liebers; Bernd Jakubowski; Wolf-Rüdiger Netz	Soviet Union; Rinat Dasaev; Tengiz Sulakvelidze; Alexandre Chivadze; Vagiz Khidiyatullin; Oleg Romantsev; Sergey Shavlo; Sergey Andreev; Vladimir Bessonov; Yuri Gavrilov; Fyodor Cherenkov; Valeri Gazzaev; Vladimir Pilguj; Sergej Baltacha; Sergei Nikulin; Khoren Hovhannisyan; Alexandr Prokopenko; Revaz Chelebadze

== Gymnastics ==
=== Medal table ===
Rank	Nation	Gold	Silver	Bronze	Total
1	Soviet Union*	9	8	5	22
2	East Germany	2	3	6	11
3	Romania	2	3	2	7
4	Bulgaria	1	0	1	2
4	Hungary	1	0	1	2
6	Czechoslovakia	0	0	1	1
Totals (6 entries)		15	14	16	45

=== Men's events ===
Games	Gold	Silver	Bronze
Individual all-around	Alexander Dityatin; Soviet Union	Nikolai Andrianov; Soviet Union	Stoyan Deltchev; Bulgaria
Team all-around	Soviet Union; Nikolai Andrianov; Eduard Azaryan; Alexander Dityatin; Bogdan Makuts; Vladimir Markelov; Aleksandr Tkachyov	East Germany; Ralf-Peter Hemmann; Lutz Hoffmann; Lutz Mack; Michael Nikolay; Andreas Bronst; Roland Brückner	Hungary; Ferenc Donáth; György Guczoghy; Zoltán Kelemen; Péter Kovács; Zoltán Magyar; István Vámos
Floor exercise	Roland Brückner; East Germany	Nikolai Andrianov; Soviet Union	Alexander Dityatin; Soviet Union
Horizontal bar	Stoyan Deltchev; Bulgaria	Alexander Dityatin; Soviet Union	Nikolai Andrianov; Soviet Union
Parallel bars	Aleksandr Tkachyov; Soviet Union	Alexander Dityatin; Soviet Union	Roland Brückner; East Germany
Pommel horse	Zoltán Magyar; Hungary	Alexander Dityatin; Soviet Union	Michael Nikolay; East Germany
Rings	Alexander Dityatin; Soviet Union	Aleksandr Tkachyov; Soviet Union	Jiri Tabak; Czechoslovakia
Vault	Nikolai Andrianov; Soviet Union	Alexander Dityatin; Soviet Union	Roland Brückner; East Germany

=== Women's events ===
Games	Gold	Silver	Bronze
Individual all-around	Elena Davydova; Soviet Union	Maxi Gnauck; East Germany	none awarded (as there was a tie for silver)
Individual all-around	Elena Davydova; Soviet Union	Nadia Comăneci; Romania	none awarded (as there was a tie for silver)
Team all-around	Soviet Union; Elena Davydova; Maria Filatova; Nellie Kim; Yelena Naimushina; Natalia Shaposhnikova; Stella Zakharova	Romania; Nadia Comăneci; Rodica Dunca; Emilia Eberle; Cristina Elena Grigoraș; Melita Ruhn; Dumitrița Turner	East Germany; Maxi Gnauck; Silvia Hindorff; Steffi Kräker; Katharina Rensch; Karola Sube; Birgit Süss
Balance beam	Nadia Comăneci; Romania	Elena Davydova; Soviet Union	Natalia Shaposhnikova; Soviet Union
Floor exercise	Nellie Kim; Soviet Union	None awarded (as there was a tie for gold)	Natalia Shaposhnikova; Soviet Union
Floor exercise	Nadia Comăneci; Romania	None awarded (as there was a tie for gold)	Maxi Gnauck; East Germany
Uneven bars	Maxi Gnauck; East Germany	Emilia Eberle; Romania	Steffi Kräker; East Germany
Uneven bars	Maxi Gnauck; East Germany	Emilia Eberle; Romania	Melita Ruhn; Romania
Uneven bars	Maxi Gnauck; East Germany	Emilia Eberle; Romania	Maria Filatova; Soviet Union
Vault	Natalia Shaposhnikova; Soviet Union	Steffi Kräker; East Germany	Melita Ruhn; Romania

== Handball ==
=== Medal table ===
Rank	Nation	Gold	Silver	Bronze	Total
1	Soviet Union*	1	1	0	2
2	East Germany	1	0	1	2
3	Yugoslavia	0	1	0	1
4	Romania	0	0	1	1
Totals (4 entries)		2	2	2	6

=== Medalists ===
Event	Gold	Silver	Bronze
Men	East Germany; Hans-Georg Beyer; Lothar Doering; Günter Dreibrodt; Ernst Gerlach; Klaus Gruner; Rainer Höft; Hans-Georg Jaunich; Hartmut Krüger; Peter Rost; Dietmar Schmidt; Wieland Schmidt; Siegfried Voigt; Frank-Michael Wahl; Ingolf Wiegert	Soviet Union; Aleksandr Anpilogov; Vladimir Belov; Yevgeni Chernyshov; Anatoli Fedyukin; Mykhaylo Ishchenko; Aleksandr Karshakevich; Yury Kidyayev; Vladimir Kravtsov; Serhiy Kushniryuk; Viktor Makhorin; Voldemaras Novickis; Vladimir Repev; Mykola Tomyn; Aleksey Zhuk	Romania; Ştefan Birtalan; Iosif Boroş; Adrian Cosma; Cezar Drăgăniṭă; Marian Dumitru; Cornel Durău; Alexandru Fölker; Claudiu Ionescu; Nicolae Munteanu; Vasile Stîngă; Lucian Vasilache; Neculai Vasilcă; Radu Voina; Maricel Voinea
Women	Soviet Union; Larysa Karlova; Tetyana Kocherhina; Valentyna Lutayeva; Aldona Nenėnienė; Lyubov Odynokova; Iryna Palchykova; Lyudmila Poradnyk; Yuliya Safina; Larisa Savkina; Sigita Strečen; Nataliya Tymoshkina; Zinaida Turchyna; Olha Zubaryeva; Natalya Lukyanenko	Yugoslavia; Svetlana Anastasovska; Mirjana Đurica; Radmila Drljača; Katica Ileš; Slavica Jeremić; Svetlana Kitić; Jasna Merdan; Vesna Milosević; Mirjana Ognjenović; Vesna Radović; Radmila Savić; Ana Titlić; Biserka Višnjić; Zorica Vojinović	East Germany; Birgit Heinecke; Roswitha Krause; Waltraud Kretzschmar; Katrin Krüger; Kornelia Kunisch; Evelyn Matz; Kristina Richter; Christina Rost; Sabine Röther; Renate Rudolph; Marion Tietz; Petra Uhlig; Claudia Wunderlich; Hannelore Zober

== Judo ==
=== Medal table ===
Rank	Nation	Gold	Silver	Bronze	Total
1	Soviet Union*	2	1	2	5
2	France	2	1	1	4
3	East Germany	1	0	4	5
4	Belgium	1	0	0	1
4	Italy	1	0	0	1
4	Switzerland	1	0	0	1
7	Cuba	0	3	0	3
8	Bulgaria	0	1	1	2
8	Great Britain	0	1	1	2
8	Mongolia	0	1	1	2
11	Hungary	0	0	2	2
12	Czechoslovakia	0	0	1	1
12	Netherlands	0	0	1	1
12	Poland	0	0	1	1
12	Yugoslavia	0	0	1	1
Totals (15 entries)		8	8	16	32

=== Medalists ===
Games	Gold	Silver	Bronze
Extra Lightweight; 60 kg	Thierry Rey; France	Jose Rodriguez; Cuba	Aramby Emizh; Soviet Union
Extra Lightweight; 60 kg	Thierry Rey; France	Jose Rodriguez; Cuba	Tibor Kincses; Hungary
Half Lightweight; 65 kg	Nikolai Solodukhin; Soviet Union	Tsendiin Damdin; Mongolia	Ilian Nedkov; Bulgaria
Half Lightweight; 65 kg	Nikolai Solodukhin; Soviet Union	Tsendiin Damdin; Mongolia	Janusz Pawłowski; Poland
Lightweight; 71 kg	Ezio Gamba; Italy	Neil Adams; Great Britain	Ravdangiin Davaadalai; Mongolia
Lightweight; 71 kg	Ezio Gamba; Italy	Neil Adams; Great Britain	Karl-Heinz Lehmann; East Germany
Half Middleweight; 78 kg	Shota Khabareli; Soviet Union	Juan Ferrer; Cuba	Harald Heinke; East Germany
Half Middleweight; 78 kg	Shota Khabareli; Soviet Union	Juan Ferrer; Cuba	Bernard Tchoullouyan; France
Middleweight; 86 kg	Jürg Röthlisberger; Switzerland	Isaac Azcuy; Cuba	Detlef Ultsch; East Germany
Middleweight; 86 kg	Jürg Röthlisberger; Switzerland	Isaac Azcuy; Cuba	Aleksandrs Jackevičs; Soviet Union
Half-Heavyweight; 95 kg	Robert Van de Walle; Belgium	Tengiz Khubuluri; Soviet Union	Dietmar Lorenz; East Germany
Half-Heavyweight; 95 kg	Robert Van de Walle; Belgium	Tengiz Khubuluri; Soviet Union	Henk Numan; Netherlands
Heavyweight +95 kg	Angelo Parisi; France	Dimitar Zaprianov; Bulgaria	Radomir Kovačević; Yugoslavia
Heavyweight +95 kg	Angelo Parisi; France	Dimitar Zaprianov; Bulgaria	Vladimír Kocman; Czechoslovakia
Open category	Dietmar Lorenz; East Germany	Angelo Parisi; France	Arthur Mapp; Great Britain
Open category	Dietmar Lorenz; East Germany	Angelo Parisi; France	András Ozsvár; Hungary

== Modern pentathlon ==
=== Medal table ===
Rank	Nation	Gold	Silver	Bronze	Total
1	Soviet Union*	2	0	1	3
2	Hungary	0	2	0	2
3	Sweden	0	0	1	1
Totals (3 entries)		2	2	2	6

=== Medalists ===
Event	Gold	Silver	Bronze
Individual	Anatoly Starostin; Soviet Union	Tamás Szombathelyi; Hungary	Pavel Lednev; Soviet Union
Team	Soviet Union; Anatoly Starostin; Pavel Lednev; Yevgeny Lipeyev	Hungary; Tamás Szombathelyi; Tibor Maracskó; László Horváth	Sweden; Svante Rasmuson; Lennart Pettersson; George Horvath

== Rowing ==
=== Medal table ===
Rank	Nation	Gold	Silver	Bronze	Total
1	East Germany	11	1	2	14
2	Soviet Union*	1	9	2	12
3	Romania	1	0	2	3
4	Finland	1	0	0	1
5	Bulgaria	0	1	3	4
6	Great Britain	0	1	2	3
7	Poland	0	1	1	2
7	Yugoslavia	0	1	1	2
9	Czechoslovakia	0	0	1	1
Totals (9 entries)		14	14	14	42

=== Men's events ===
Games	Gold	Silver	Bronze
Single sculls	Pertti Karppinen; Finland	Vasil Yakusha; Soviet Union	Peter Kersten; East Germany
Double sculls	East Germany; Joachim Dreifke; Klaus Kröppelien	Yugoslavia; Zoran Pančić; Milorad Stanulov	Czechoslovakia; Zdeněk Pecka; Václav Vochoska
Quadruple sculls (coxless)	East Germany; Frank Dundr; Carsten Bunk; Uwe Heppner; Martin Winter	Soviet Union; Yuriy Shapochka; Evgeniy Barbakov; Valeriy Kleshnyov; Mykola Dovhan	Bulgaria; Mincho Nikolov; Lyubomir Petrov; Ivo Rusev; Bogdan Dobrev
Coxless pairs	East Germany; Bernd Landvoigt; Jörg Landvoigt	Soviet Union; Yuriy Pimenov; Nikolay Pimenov	Great Britain; Charles Wiggin; Malcolm Carmichael
Coxed pairs	East Germany; Harald Jährling; Friedrich-Wilhelm Ulrich; Georg Spohr (cox)	Soviet Union; Viktor Pereverzev; Gennadi Kryuçkin; Aleksandr Lukyanov (cox)	Yugoslavia; Duško Mrduljaš; Zlatko Celent; Josip Reić (cox)
Coxless fours	East Germany; Siegfried Brietzke; Andreas Decker; Stefan Semmler; Jürgen Thiele	Soviet Union; Aleksey Kamkin; Valeriy Dolinin; Aleksandr Kulagin; Vitali Eliseev	Great Britain; John Beattie; Ian McNuff; David Townsend; Martin Cross
Coxed four	East Germany; Dieter Wendisch; Walter Dießner; Ullrich Dießner; Gottfried Döhn; Andreas Gregor (cox)	Soviet Union; Artūrs Garonskis; Dimants Krišjānis; Dzintars Krišjānis; Žoržs Tikmers; Juris Bērziņš (cox)	Poland; Grzegorz Stellak; Adam Tomasiak; Grzegorz Nowak; Ryszard Stadniuk; Ryszard Kubiak (cox)
Eights	East Germany; Bernd Krauß; Hans-Peter Koppe; Ulrich Kons; Jörg Friedrich; Jens Doberschütz; Ulrich Karnatz; Uwe Dühring; Bernd Höing; Klaus-Dieter Ludwig (cox)	Great Britain; Duncan McDougall; Allan Whitwell; Henry Clay; Chris Mahoney; Andrew Justice; John Pritchard; Malcolm McGowan; Richard Stanhope; Colin Moynihan (cox)	Soviet Union; Viktor Kokoshyn; Andriy Tishchenko; Oleksandr Tkachenko; Jonas Pinskus; Jonas Narmontas; Andrey Luhin; Oleksandr Mantsevych; Ihar Maystrenka; Hryhoriy Dmytrenko (cox)

=== Women's events ===
Games	Gold	Silver	Bronze
Single sculls	Sanda Toma; Romania	Antonina Zelikovich; Soviet Union	Martina Schröter; East Germany
Double sculls	Soviet Union; Yelena Khloptseva; Larisa Popova	East Germany; Cornelia Linse; Heidi Westphal	Romania; Olga Homeghi; Valeria Răcilă
Quadruple sculls (coxed)	East Germany; Sybille Reinhardt; Jutta Ploch; Jutta Lau; Roswietha Zobelt; Liane Buhr	Soviet Union; Antonina Pustovit; Yelena Matiyevskaya; Olga Vasilchenko; Nadezhda Lyubimova; Nina Cheremisina	Bulgaria; Mariana Serbezova; Rumelyana Boncheva; Dolores Nakova; Anka Bakova; Anka Georgieva
Coxless pairs	East Germany; Ute Steindorf; Cornelia Klier	Poland; Małgorzata Dłużewska; Czesława Kościańska	Bulgaria; Siika Barboulova; Stoyanka Kurbatova
Coxed four	East Germany; Ramona Kapheim; Silvia Fröhlich; Angelika Noack; Romy Saalfeld; Kirsten Wenzel	Bulgaria; Ginka Gyurova; Mariyka Modeva; Rita Todorova; Iskra Velinova; Nadiya Filipova	Soviet Union; Mariya Fadeyeva; Galina Sovetnikova; Marina Studneva; Svetlana Semyonova; Nina Cheremisina
Eights	East Germany; Martina Boesler; Christiane Knetsch; Gabriele Kühn; Karin Metze; Kersten Neisser; Ilona Richter; Marita Sandig; Birgit Schütz; Marina Wilke (cox)	Soviet Union; Mariya Payun; Olga Pivovarova; Nina Preobrazhenskaya; Nadezhda Prishchepa; Tatyana Stetsenko; Elena Tereshina; Nina Umanets; Valentina Zhulina; Nina Frolova (cox)	Romania; Angelica Aposteanu; Elena Bondar; Florica Bucur; Maria Constantinescu; Rodica Frîntu; Ana Iliuță; Rodica Pușcatu; Marlena Zagoni; Elena Dobrițoiu (cox)

== Sailing ==
=== Medal table ===
Rank	Nation	Gold	Silver	Bronze	Total
1	Brazil	2	0	0	2
2	Soviet Union*	1	1	1	3
3	Denmark	1	1	0	2
4	Finland	1	0	1	2
5	Spain	1	0	0	1
6	Austria	0	2	0	2
7	East Germany	0	1	0	1
7	Ireland	0	1	0	1
9	Greece	0	0	1	1
9	Hungary	0	0	1	1
9	Italy	0	0	1	1
9	Sweden	0	0	1	1
Totals (12 entries)		6	6	6	18

=== Medalists ===
Event	Gold	Silver	Bronze
Finn	Esko Rechardt; Finland	Wolfgang Mayrhofer; Austria	Andrei Balashov; Soviet Union
470	Brazil; Marcos Soares; Eduardo Penido	East Germany; Jörn Borowski; Egbert Swensson	Finland; Jouko Lindgrén; Georg Tallberg
Flying Dutchman	Spain; Alejandro Abascal; Miguel Noguer	Ireland; David Wilkins; James Wilkinson	Hungary; Szabolcs Detre; Zsolt Detre
Tornado	Brazil; Lars Sigurd Björkström; Alexandre Welter	Denmark; Peter Due; Per Kjergard	Sweden; Göran Marström; Jörgen Ragnarsson
Star	Soviet Union; Valentin Mankin; Aleksandr Muzychenko	Austria; Hubert Raudaschl; Karl Ferstl	Italy; Giorgio Gorla; Alfio Peraboni
Soling	Denmark; Poul Richard Høj Jensen; Valdemar Bandolowski; Erik Hansen	Soviet Union; Boris Budnikov; Alexandr Budnikov; Nikolay Poliakov	Greece; Anastasios Bountouris; Anastasios Gavrilis; Aristidis Rapanakis

== Shooting ==
=== Medal table ===
Rank	Nation	Gold	Silver	Bronze	Total
1	Soviet Union*	3	1	1	5
2	Denmark	1	0	0	1
2	Hungary	1	0	0	1
2	Italy	1	0	0	1
2	Romania	1	0	0	1
6	East Germany	0	5	1	6
7	Sweden	0	1	1	2
8	Bulgaria	0	0	2	2
9	Austria	0	0	1	1
9	Cuba	0	0	1	1
Totals (10 entries)		7	7	7	21

=== Medalists ===
Games	Gold	Silver	Bronze
25 m rapid fire pistol	Corneliu Ion; Romania	Jürgen Wiefel; East Germany	Gerhard Petritsch; Austria
50 m pistol	Aleksandr Melentyev; Soviet Union	Harald Vollmar; East Germany	Lyubcho Dyakov; Bulgaria
50 m rifle prone	Károly Varga; Hungary	Hellfried Heilfort; East Germany	Petar Zapryanov; Bulgaria
50 m rifle three positions	Viktor Vlasov; Soviet Union	Bernd Hartstein; East Germany	Sven Johansson; Sweden
50 m running target	Igor Sokolov; Soviet Union	Thomas Pfeffer; East Germany	Aleksandr Gazov; Soviet Union
Skeet	Kjeld Rasmussen; Denmark	Lars-Göran Carlsson; Sweden	Roberto Castrillo; Cuba
Trap	Luciano Giovannetti; Italy	Rustam Yambulatov; Soviet Union	Jörg Damme; East Germany

== Swimming ==
=== Medal table ===
* Host nation (Soviet Union)

Rank	Nation	Gold	Silver	Bronze	Total
1	East Germany	12	10	8	30
2	Soviet Union*	8	9	5	22
3	Sweden	2	2	1	5
4	Australia	2	0	5	7
5	Great Britain	1	3	1	5
6	Hungary	1	2	1	4
7	Brazil	0	0	1	1
7	Denmark	0	0	1	1
7	Netherlands	0	0	1	1
7	Poland	0	0	1	1
7	Spain	0	0	1	1
Totals (11 entries)		26	26	26	78

=== Men's events ===
Games	Gold		Silver		Bronze	
100 m freestyle	Jörg Woithe; East Germany	50.40	Per Holmertz; Sweden	50.91	Per Johansson; Sweden	51.29
200 m freestyle	Sergey Koplyakov; Soviet Union	1:49.81; OR	Andrey Krylov; Soviet Union	1:50.76	Graeme Brewer; Australia	1:51.60
400 m freestyle	Vladimir Salnikov; Soviet Union	3:51.31; OR	Andrey Krylov; Soviet Union	3:53.24	Ivar Stukolkin; Soviet Union	3:53.95
1500 m freestyle	Vladimir Salnikov; Soviet Union	14:58.27; WR	Aleksandr Chayev; Soviet Union	15:14.30	Max Metzker; Australia	15:14.49
100 m backstroke	Bengt Baron; Sweden	56.53	Viktor Kuznetsov; Soviet Union	56.99	Vladimir Dolgov; Soviet Union	57.63
200 m backstroke	Sándor Wladár; Hungary	2:01.93	Zoltán Verrasztó; Hungary	2:02.40	Mark Kerry; Australia	2:03.14
100 m breaststroke	Duncan Goodhew; Great Britain	1:03.34	Arsens Miskarovs; Soviet Union	1:03.82	Peter Evans; Australia	1:03.96
200 m breaststroke	Robertas Žulpa; Soviet Union	2:15.85	Albán Vermes; Hungary	2:16.93	Arsens Miskarovs; Soviet Union	2:17.28
100 m butterfly	Pär Arvidsson; Sweden	54.92	Roger Pyttel; East Germany	54.94	David López-Zubero; Spain	55.13
200 m butterfly	Sergey Fesenko; Soviet Union	1:59.76	Phil Hubble; Great Britain	2:01.20	Roger Pyttel; East Germany	2:01.39
400 m individual medley	Aleksandr Sidorenko; Soviet Union	4:22.89; OR	Sergey Fesenko; Soviet Union	4:23.43	Zoltán Verrasztó; Hungary	4:24.24
4 × 200 m freestyle relay	Soviet Union; Sergey Kopliakov; Vladimir Salnikov; Ivar Stukolkin; Andrey Krylov; Sergey Rusin*; Sergey Krasyuk*; Yuri Presekin*	7:23.50	East Germany; Frank Pfütze; Jörg Woithe; Detlev Grabs; Rainer Strohbach; Frank Kühne*	7:28.60	Brazil; Jorge Fernandes; Marcus Mattioli; Cyro Marques; Djan Madruga	7:29.30
4 × 100 m medley relay	Australia; Mark Kerry; Peter Evans; Mark Tonelli; Neil Brooks; Glenn Patching*	3:45.70	Soviet Union; Viktor Kuznetsov; Arsens Miskarovs; Yevgeny Seredin; Sergey Kopliakov; Vladimir Shemetov*; Aleksandr Fedorovsky*; Aleksey Markovsky*; Sergey Krasyuk*	3:45.92	Great Britain; Gary Abraham; Duncan Goodhew; David Lowe; Martin Smith; Paul Marshall*; Mark Taylor*	3:47.71

* Swimmers who participated in the heats only and received medals.

=== Women's events ===
Games	Gold		Silver		Bronze	
100 m freestyle	Barbara Krause; East Germany	54.79; WR	Caren Metschuck; East Germany	55.16	Ines Diers; East Germany	55.65
200 m freestyle	Barbara Krause; East Germany	1:58.33; OR	Ines Diers; East Germany	1:59.64	Carmela Schmidt; East Germany	2:01.44
400 m freestyle	Ines Diers; East Germany	4:08.76; OR	Petra Schneider; East Germany	4:09.16	Carmela Schmidt; East Germany	4:10.86
800 m freestyle	Michelle Ford; Australia	8:28.90; OR	Ines Diers; East Germany	8:32.55	Heike Dähne; East Germany	8:33.48
100 m backstroke	Rica Reinisch; East Germany	1:00.86; WR	Ina Kleber; East Germany	1:02.07	Petra Riedel; East Germany	1:02.64
200 m backstroke	Rica Reinisch; East Germany	2:11.77; WR	Cornelia Polit; East Germany	2:13.75	Birgit Treiber; East Germany	2:14.14
100 m breaststroke	Ute Geweniger; East Germany	1:10.22	Elvira Vasilkova; Soviet Union	1:10.41	Susanne Nielsson; Denmark	1:11.16
200 m breaststroke	Lina Kačiušytė; Soviet Union	2:29.54; OR	Svetlana Varganova; Soviet Union	2:29.61	Yuliya Bogdanova; Soviet Union	2:32.39
100 m butterfly	Caren Metschuck; East Germany	1:00.42	Andrea Pollack; East Germany	1:00.90	Christiane Knacke; East Germany	1:01.44
200 m butterfly	Ines Geißler; East Germany	2:10.44; OR	Sybille Schönrock; East Germany	2:10.45	Michelle Ford; Australia	2:11.66
400 m individual medley	Petra Schneider; East Germany	4:36.29; WR	Sharron Davies; Great Britain	4:46.83	Agnieszka Czopek; Poland	4:48.17
4 × 100 m freestyle relay	East Germany; Barbara Krause; Caren Metschuck; Ines Diers; Sarina Hülsenbeck; Carmela Schmidt*	3:42.71; WR	Sweden; Carina Ljungdahl; Tina Gustafsson; Agneta Mårtensson; Agneta Eriksson; Birgitta Jönsson*; Helena Peterson*	3:48.93	Netherlands; Conny van Bentum; Wilma van Velsen; Reggie de Jong; Annelies Maas	3:49.51
4 × 100 m medley relay	East Germany; Rica Reinisch; Ute Geweniger; Andrea Pollack; Caren Metschuck; Sarina Hülsenbeck*	4:06.67; WR	Great Britain; Helen Jameson; Margaret Kelly; Ann Osgerby; June Croft	4:12.24	Soviet Union; Yelena Kruglova; Elvira Vasilkova; Alla Grishchenkova; Natalya Strunnikova; Irina Aksyonova*; Olga Klevakina*	4:13.61

* Swimmers who participated in the heats only and received medals.

== Volleyball ==
=== Medal table ===
Rank	Nation	Gold	Silver	Bronze	Total
1	Soviet Union*	2	0	0	2
2	Bulgaria	0	1	1	2
3	East Germany	0	1	0	1
4	Romania	0	0	1	1
Totals (4 entries)		2	2	2	6

=== Medalists ===
Event	Gold	Silver	Bronze
Men's	Soviet Union; Vladimir Chernyshov; Vladimir Dorokhov; Aleksandr Ermilov; Vladimir Kondra; Valeriy Kryvov; Fedir Lashchonov; Viljar Loor; Oleg Moliboga; Yuriy Panchenko; Aleksandr Savin; Pāvels Seļivanovs; Vyacheslav Zaytsev	Bulgaria; Yordan Angelov; Dimitar Dimitrov; Stefan Dimitrov; Stoyan Gunchev; Hristo Iliev; Petko Petkov; Kaspar Simeonov; Hristo Stoyanov; Mitko Todorov; Tsano Tsanov; Emil Valtchev; Dimitar Zlatanov	Romania; Marius Căta-Chiţiga; Valter Chifu; Laurenţiu Dumănoiu; Günther Enescu; Dan Gîrleanu; Sorin Macavei; Viorel Manole; Florin Mina; Corneliu Oros; Nicolae Pop; Constantin Sterea; Nicu Stoian
Women's	Soviet Union; Elena Akhaminova; Elena Andreiuk; Svetlana Badulina; Liudmila Chernyshova; Liubov Kozyreva; Lidia Loginova; Irina Makogonova; Svetlana Nikishina; Larisa Pavlova; Nadezhda Radzevich; Natalia Razumova; Olga Solovova	East Germany; Katharina Bullin; Barbara Czekalla; Brigitte Fetzer; Andrea Heim; Ute Kostrzewa; Heike Lehmann; Christine Mummhardt; Karin Püschel; Karla Roffeis; Martina Schmidt; Annette Schultz; Anke Westendorf	Bulgaria; Verka Borisova; Tsvetana Bozhurina; Rositsa Dimitrova; Tanya Dimitrova; Maya Georgieva; Margarita Gerasimova; Tanya Gogova; Valentina Ilieva; Rumyana Kaisheva; Anka Khristolova; Silviya Petrunova; Galina Stancheva

== Water polo ==
=== Medal table ===
Rank	Nation	Gold	Silver	Bronze	Total
1	Soviet Union*	1	0	0	1
2	Yugoslavia	0	1	0	1
3	Hungary	0	0	1	1
Totals (3 entries)		1	1	1	3

=== Medalists ===
Event	Gold	Silver	Bronze
Men	Soviet Union; Vladimir Akimov; Aleksey Barkalov; Yevgeny Grishin; Mikhail Ivanov; Aleksandr Kabanov; Sergey Kotenko; Georgi Mshvenieradze; Mait Riisman; Viacheslav Sobchenko; Yevgeny Sharonov; Erkin Shagaev	Yugoslavia; Luka Vezlić; Zoran Gopčević; Damir Polić; Ratko Rudić; Zoran Mustur; Zoran Roje; Milivoj Bebić; Slobodan Trifunović; Boško Lozica; Predrag Manojlović; Milorad Krivokapić	Hungary; Endre Molnár; István Szívós, Jr. Attila Sudár; György Gerendás; György Horkai; Gábor Csapó; István Udvardi; László Kuncz; Tamás Faragó; Károly Hauszler; István Kiss

== Weightlifting ==
=== Medal table ===
Rank	Nation	Gold	Silver	Bronze	Total
1	Soviet Union*	5	3	0	8
2	Bulgaria	2	4	2	8
3	Cuba	1	0	1	2
3	Czechoslovakia	1	0	1	2
3	Hungary	1	0	1	2
6	East Germany	0	2	1	3
7	North Korea	0	1	1	2
8	Poland	0	0	3	3
Totals (8 entries)		10	10	10	30

=== Medalists ===
Event	Gold	Silver	Bronze
52 kg	Kanybek Osmonaliyev; Soviet Union	Ho Bong-chol; North Korea	Han Gyong-si; North Korea
56 kg	Daniel Núñez; Cuba	Yurik Sarkisyan; Soviet Union	Tadeusz Dembończyk; Poland
60 kg	Viktor Mazin; Soviet Union	Stefan Dimitrov; Bulgaria	Marek Seweryn; Poland
67.5 kg	Yanko Rusev; Bulgaria	Joachim Kunz; East Germany	Mincho Pashov; Bulgaria
75 kg	Asen Zlatev; Bulgaria	Aleksandr Pervi; Soviet Union	Nedelcho Kolev; Bulgaria
82.5 kg	Yurik Vardanyan; Soviet Union	Blagoy Blagoev; Bulgaria	Dušan Poliačik; Czechoslovakia
90 kg	Péter Baczakó; Hungary	Rumen Aleksandrov; Bulgaria	Frank Mantek; East Germany
100 kg	Ota Zaremba; Czechoslovakia	Igor Nikitin; Soviet Union	Alberto Blanco; Cuba
110 kg	Leonid Taranenko; Soviet Union	Valentin Khristov; Bulgaria	György Szalai; Hungary
+110 kg	Sultan Rakhmanov; Soviet Union	Jürgen Heuser; East Germany	Tadeusz Rutkowski; Poland

== Wrestling ==
=== Medal table ===
Rank	Nation	Gold	Silver	Bronze	Total
1	Soviet Union*	12	3	2	17
2	Bulgaria	3	4	3	10
3	Hungary	2	3	2	7
4	Romania	1	1	2	4
5	Greece	1	0	1	2
6	Italy	1	0	0	1
7	Poland	0	5	2	7
8	North Korea	0	2	0	2
9	Mongolia	0	1	1	2
10	East Germany	0	1	0	1
11	Czechoslovakia	0	0	2	2
11	Sweden	0	0	2	2
13	Finland	0	0	1	1
13	Lebanon	0	0	1	1
13	Yugoslavia	0	0	1	1
Totals (15 entries)		20	20	20	60

=== Freestyle ===
Event	Gold	Silver	Bronze
48 kg	Claudio Pollio; Italy	Jang Se-hong; North Korea	Sergei Kornilayev; Soviet Union
52 kg	Anatoli Beloglazov; Soviet Union	Władysław Stecyk; Poland	Nermedin Selimov; Bulgaria
57 kg	Sergei Beloglazov; Soviet Union	Li Ho-pyong; North Korea	Dugarsürengiin Oyuunbold; Mongolia
62 kg	Magomedgasan Abushev; Soviet Union	Miho Dukov; Bulgaria	Georgios Hatziioannidis; Greece
68 kg	Saipulla Absaidov; Soviet Union	Ivan Yankov; Bulgaria	Šaban Sejdi; Yugoslavia
74 kg	Valentin Raychev; Bulgaria	Jamtsyn Davaajav; Mongolia	Dan Karabin; Czechoslovakia
82 kg	Ismail Abilov; Bulgaria	Magomedkhan Aratsilov; Soviet Union	István Kovács; Hungary
90 kg	Sanasar Oganisyan; Soviet Union	Uwe Neupert; East Germany	Aleksander Cichoń; Poland
100 kg	Illya Mate; Soviet Union	Slavcho Chervenkov; Bulgaria	Július Strnisko; Czechoslovakia
+100 kg	Soslan Andiyev; Soviet Union	József Balla; Hungary	Adam Sandurski; Poland

=== Greco-Roman ===
Event	Gold	Silver	Bronze
48 kg	Zhaqsylyq Üshkempirov; Soviet Union	Constantin Alexandru; Romania	Ferenc Seres; Hungary
52 kg	Vakhtang Blagidze; Soviet Union	Lajos Rácz; Hungary	Mladen Mladenov; Bulgaria
57 kg	Shamil Serikov; Soviet Union	Józef Lipień; Poland	Benni Ljungbeck; Sweden
62 kg	Stelios Mygiakis; Greece	István Tóth; Hungary	Boris Kramarenko; Soviet Union
68 kg	Ștefan Rusu; Romania	Andrzej Supron; Poland	Lars-Erik Skiöld; Sweden
74 kg	Ferenc Kocsis; Hungary	Anatoly Bykov; Soviet Union	Mikko Huhtala; Finland
82 kg	Gennadi Korban; Soviet Union	Jan Dołgowicz; Poland	Pavel Pavlov; Bulgaria
90 kg	Norbert Növényi; Hungary	Ihar Kanyhin; Soviet Union	Petre Dicu; Romania
100 kg	Georgi Raikov; Bulgaria	Roman Bierła; Poland	Vasile Andrei; Romania
+100 kg	Oleksandr Kolchynskyy; Soviet Union	Aleksandar Tomov; Bulgaria	Hassan Bechara; Lebanon
