= Rowing at the Friendship Games =

Rowing at the Friendship Games took place at the Krylatskoye Rowing Canal in Moscow, Soviet Union between 23 and 25 August 1984. 14 events (8 men's and 6 women's) were contested.

== Medal summary ==
=== Men's events ===
Event	Gold		Silver		Bronze	
Single sculls	Vasil Yakusha (URS)	7:14.23	Heiko Habermann (GDR)	7:21.30	Vladek Lacina (TCH)	7:26.59
Double sculls	Soviet Union (URS); Sergey Kinyakin; Pyotr Kinyakin	6:35.98	Bulgaria (BUL); Ivan Midyurov; Mincho Nikolov	6:37.33	Poland (POL); Kajetan Broniewski; Andrzej Krzepiński	6:44.66
Quadruple sculls	East Germany (GDR); Bernd Kalisch; Uwe Mund; Klaus Kröppelien; Karl-Heinz Bußert	5:58.82	Poland (POL); Sławomir Cieślakowski; Mirosław Szymanowski; Marek Bałdyga; Mirosław Mruk	5:59.67	Soviet Union (URS); Alexander Zdravomyslov; Igor Antonov; Saulius Krasauskas; Gintautas Giedrajtis	6:04.28
Coxless pair	Soviet Union (URS); Yuriy Pimenov; Nikolay Pimenov	7:06.65	Czechoslovakia (TCH); Ivan Kafka; Miroslav Laholik	7:19.15	Bulgaria (BUL); Todor Vindeliyev; Emil Groncov	7:26.39
Coxed pair	Soviet Union (URS); Igor Maistrenko; Stasis Narushaitis; Pyotr Petrinich (c)	7:10.81	Czechoslovakia (TCH); Milan Doleček Sr. Milan Škopek; Oldřich Hejdušek (c)	7:15.21	East Germany (GDR); Karsten Schmeling; Dietmar Schiller; Hendrik Reiher (c)	7:23.93
Coxless four	Soviet Union (URS); Gennadi Kryuçkin; Viktor Pereverzev; Sergey Smirnov; Jonas Narmontas	6:17.94	East Germany (GDR); Ullrich Dießner; Olaf Förster; Thomas Greiner; Thomas Bänsch	6:24.55	Czechoslovakia (TCH); Petr Hlídek; Pavel Konvička; Miroslav Vraštil; Lubomír Zapletal	6:29.98
Coxed four	Soviet Union (URS); Zigmantas Gudauskas; Vladimir Romanishin; Igor Zotov; Ivan Vysotskiy; Mikhail Sassov (c)	6:22.64	East Germany (GDR); Ole Pingel; Karsten Timm; Hans-Peter Koppe; Dirk Rendant; Michael Schimming (c)	6:26.86	Bulgaria (BUL); Tsvetan Petkov; Mikhail Petrov; Matei Khristov; Petr Yovchev; Nenko Dobrev (c)	6:30.82
Eights	Soviet Union (URS); Andrey Vasilyev; Aleksandr Voloshin; Nikolay Komarov; Pavel Gurkovsky; Viktor Diduk; Viktor Omelyanovich; Veniamin But; Jonas Pinskus; Vladimir Nizhegorodov (c)	5:54.16	East Germany (GDR); Uwe Gash; Bernd Niesecke; Jörg Friedrich; Siegfried Schallkovski; Hans Sennewald; Jörg Timmermann; Mario Minge; Jürgen Thiele; Klaus-Dieter Ludwig (c)	5:56.81	Czechoslovakia (TCH); Mihal Slani(?); Jiří Mák; Pavel Pevný; Jiří Prudil; Dušan Novotník; Dušan Vičík; Hubert Ševela; Milan Kyselý; Antonín Barák (c)	5:59.08

=== Women's events ===
Event	Gold		Silver		Bronze	
Single sculls	Mariya Danilyuk (URS)	3:52.77	Birgit Peter (GDR)	3:53.09	Magdalena Georgieva (BUL)	3:57.73
Double sculls	Kirsten Peters; Ramona Balthasar (GDR)	3:30.27	Margarita Dobcheva; Anka Ruseva (BUL)	3:32.93	Tatyana Bashkatova; Mariya Zalite (URS)	3:33.16
Coxless pair	Soviet Union (URS); Vida Česiunaite; Raisa Doligoyda	3:36.51	East Germany (GDR); Susann Heinicke; Heike Winkler	3:40.75	Bulgaria (BUL); Rita Todorova; Teodora Zareva	3:44.16
Quadruple sculls	Soviet Union (URS); Antonina Dumcheva; Yelena Bratishko; Yelena Khloptseva; Irina Fetisova; Maria Zemskova (c)	3:18.41	Bulgaria (BUL); Rumyana Pochilyeva; Violeta Ninova; Stefka Madina; Teodora Nikolova-Lazarova; Greta Georgieva (c)	3:20.73	Hungary (HUN); Erzsébet Sarlós; Klára Pétervári; Kamilla Kosztolányi; Erika Bertényi; Erika Polgár (c)	3:35.58
Coxed four	Soviet Union (URS); Angele Kulikauskaite; Svetlana Semyonova; Valentina Semyonova; Marina Studneva; Nina Cheremisina (c)	3:23.37	Bulgaria (BUL); Iskra Velinova; Olya Stoichkova; Lilyana Koleva; Todorka Vasileva; Nadiya Filipova (c)	3:28.42	East Germany (GDR); Andro Rutgers; Kathrin Dienstbier; Ramona Haim; Kerstin Tussen; Silke Kretchmar (c)	3:30.06
Eights	Soviet Union (URS); Elena Makushkina; Nataliya Yatsenko; Nina Umanets; Elena Tereshina; Sarmīte Stone; Irina Teterina; Lidiya Averyanova; Lyudmila Konoplyova; Valentina Khokhlova (c)	3:09.27	Bulgaria (BUL); Valentina Usherova; Antonina Vladimirova; Valentina Aleksandrova; Snezhana Ilieyva; Radka Stoyanova; Lalka Berberova; Daniela Oronova; Nevyana Ivanova; Vania Moisova (c)	3:13.92	none*	–

* – only two teams competed

== Medal table ==
* Host nation (Soviet Union)

Rank	Nation	Gold	Silver	Bronze	Total
1	Soviet Union (URS)*	12	0	2	14
2	East Germany (GDR)	2	6	2	10
3	Bulgaria (BUL)	0	5	4	9
4	Czechoslovakia (TCH)	0	2	3	5
5	Poland (POL)	0	1	1	2
6	Hungary (HUN)	0	0	1	1
Totals (6 entries)		14	14	13	41

== See also ==
- Rowing at the 1984 Summer Olympics
