= Doleček =

Doleček (feminine: Dolečková) is a Czech surname. Notable people with the surname include:

- Gordana Jovanović Doleček (born 1946), Yugoslav-Mexican electronics engineer
- Lara Dolecek (born 1976), American coding theorist
- Milan Doleček (born 1982), Czech rower
- Milan Doleček (rower, born 1957), Czech rower
