= Rowing at the 1980 Summer Olympics – Men's eight =

Men's eights at the Games of the XXII Olympiad
- Venue: Krylatskoye Rowing Canal
- Dates: 21–26 July 1980
- Competitors: 81 from 9 nations
- Winning time: 5:49.05

Medalists
1st place, gold medalist(s)		East Germany: Bernd Krauß; Hans-Peter Koppe; Ulrich Kons; Jörg Friedrich; Jens Doberschütz; Ulrich Karnatz; Uwe Dühring; Bernd Höing; Klaus-Dieter Ludwig (cox)
2nd place, silver medalist(s)		Great Britain: Duncan McDougall; Allan Whitwell; Henry Clay; Chris Mahoney; Andrew Justice; John Pritchard; Malcolm McGowan; Richard Stanhope; Colin Moynihan (cox)
3rd place, bronze medalist(s)		Soviet Union: Viktor Kokoshyn; Andriy Tishchenko; Oleksandr Tkachenko; Jonas Pinskus; Jonas Narmontas; Andrey Luhin; Oleksandr Mantsevych; Ihar Maystrenka; Hryhoriy Dmytrenko (cox)

The men's eight rowing competition at the 1980 Summer Olympics took place at the Krylatskoye Rowing Canal in Moscow, Soviet Union. The event was held from 21 to 26 July. There were 9 boats (81 competitors) from 9 nations, with each nation limited to a single boat in the event. The first two places were the same as in 1976, with East Germany successfully defending its title (the third nation to do so, after the United States and Great Britain) and Great Britain repeating as runner-up. The 1976 bronze medalist, New Zealand, was not competing; the Soviet Union took bronze in 1980.

== Background ==
This was the 18th appearance of the event. Rowing had been on the programme in 1896 but was cancelled due to bad weather. The men's eight has been held every time that rowing has been contested, beginning in 1900.

Beginning with an Olympic bronze medal in 1972 and running through the 1970s, East Germany had risen to take a dominant place in men's eight competitions. By the time of the Moscow Games, the East Germans were the reigning (1976) Olympic champions and four-time reigning (1975, 1977, 1978, and 1979) World champions. Two major competitors, New Zealand and West Germany, were absent in 1980; East Germany was thus heavily favoured over the nearest competitors (host Soviet Union).

Bulgaria made its debut in the event. Great Britain made its 14th appearance, most among nations competing in 1980 and tied with the absent Canada for second-most behind the also-absent United States at 15.

== Competition format ==
The "eight" event featured nine-person boats, with eight rowers and a coxswain. It was a sweep rowing event, with the rowers each having one oar (and thus each rowing on one side). This rowing competition consisted of two main rounds (semifinals and finals), as well as a repechage round after the semifinals. The course used the 2000 metres distance that became the Olympic standard in 1912 (with the exception of 1948). Races were held in up to six lanes.

- Semifinals: Two heats with four or five boats each. The top boat in each semifinal (2 boats total) went to the "A" final, while the remaining boats (7 total) went to the repechage.
- Repechage: Two heats with three or four boats each. The top two boats in each heat (4 boats total) advanced to the "A" final, with the remainder (3 boats) to the "B" final (out of medal contention).
- Finals: The "A" final consisted of the top six boats, competing for the medals and 4th through 6th place. The "B" final had the next three boats; they competed for 7th through 9th place.

== Schedule ==
All times are Moscow Time (UTC+3)

Date	Time	Round
Sunday, 20 July 1980	13:10	Semifinals
Thursday, 24 July 1980	12:10	Repechage
Sunday, 27 July 1980	13:30	Finals

== Results ==
=== Semifinals ===
The fastest team in each heat advanced to the "A" final. The remaining teams competed in the repechage for the remaining spots in the final.

==== Semifinal 1 ====
Rank	Rowers	Coxswain	Nation	Time	Notes
1	Viktor Kokoshyn; Andriy Tishchenko; Oleksandr Tkachenko; Jonas Pinskus; Jonas Narmontas; Andrey Luhin; Oleksandr Mantsevych; Ihar Maystrenka	Hryhoriy Dmytrenko	Soviet Union	5:50.76	QA
2	Duncan McDougall; Allan Whitwell; Henry Clay; Chris Mahoney; Andrew Justice; John Pritchard; Malcolm McGowan; Richard Stanhope	Colin Moynihan	Great Britain	5:53.38	R
3	Paweł Borkowski; Wiesław Kujda; Grzegorz Stellak; Adam Tomasiak; Grzegorz Nowak; Ryszard Stadniuk; Mirosław Kowalewski; Władysław Beszterda	Ryszard Kubiak	Poland	6:00.43	R
4	Dimitar Yanakiev; Todor Mrankov; Bozhidar Rangelov; Ivan Botev; Yani Ignatov; Mikhail Petrov; Petar Patsev; Veselin Shterev	Ventseslav Kanchev	Bulgaria	6:03.99	R
5	Ferenc Kiss; Péter Tóvári; Róbert Sass; Attila Strochmayer; András Kormos; Zoltán Sztárcsevics; Kálmán Toronyi; László Kiss	Miklós Bálint	Hungary	6:04.32	R

==== Semifinal 2 ====
Rank	Rowers	Coxswain	Nation	Time	Notes
1	Bernd Krauß; Hans-Peter Koppe; Ulrich Kons; Jörg Friedrich; Jens Doberschütz; Ulrich Karnatz; Uwe Dühring; Bernd Höing	Klaus-Dieter Ludwig	East Germany	5:55.89	QA
2	Pavel Pevný; Lubomír Janko; Ctirad Jungmann; Karel Neffe; Karel Mejta Jr; Dušan Vičík; Milan Doleček; Milan Kyselý	Jiří Pták	Czechoslovakia	6:01.68	R
3	Islay Lee; Steve Handley; Bill Dankbaar; Andrew Withers; Tim Willoughby; James Lowe; Tim Young; Brian Richardson	David England	Australia	6:05.12	R
4	Wenceslao Borroto; Ismael Carbonell; Juan Alfonso; Juan Bueno; Francisco Mora; Hermenegildo Palacio; Jorge Álvarez; Antonio Riaño	Enrique Carrillo	Cuba	6:26.53	R

=== Repechage ===
The two fastest teams in each repechage heat advanced to the "A" final.

==== Repechage heat 1 ====
Rank	Rowers	Coxswain	Nation	Time	Notes
1	Islay Lee; Steve Handley; Bill Dankbaar; Andrew Withers; Tim Willoughby; James Lowe; Tim Young; Brian Richardson	David England	Australia	5:45.04	QA
2	Duncan McDougall; Allan Whitwell; Henry Clay; Chris Mahoney; Andrew Justice; John Pritchard; Malcolm McGowan; Richard Stanhope	Colin Moynihan	Great Britain	5:49.35	QA
3	Wenceslao Borroto; Ismael Carbonell; Juan Alfonso; Juan Bueno; Francisco Mora; Hermenegildo Palacio; Jorge Álvarez; Antonio Riaño	Enrique Carrillo	Cuba	5:56.19	QB
4	Ferenc Kiss; Péter Tóvári; Róbert Sass; Attila Strochmayer; András Kormos; Zoltán Sztárcsevics; Kálmán Toronyi; László Kiss	Miklós Bálint	Hungary	5:59.53	QB

==== Repechage heat 2 ====
Rank	Rowers	Coxswain	Nation	Time	Notes
1	Pavel Pevný; Lubomír Janko; Ctirad Jungmann; Karel Neffe; Karel Mejta Jr; Dušan Vičík; Milan Doleček; Milan Kyselý	Jiří Pták	Czechoslovakia	5:44.80	QA
2	Dimitar Yanakiev; Todor Mrankov; Bozhidar Rangelov; Ivan Botev; Yani Ignatov; Mikhail Petrov; Petar Patsev; Veselin Shterev	Ventseslav Kanchev	Bulgaria	5:46.28	QA
3	Paweł Borkowski; Wiesław Kujda; Grzegorz Stellak; Adam Tomasiak; Grzegorz Nowak; Ryszard Stadniuk; Mirosław Kowalewski; Władysław Beszterda	Ryszard Kubiak	Poland	5:47.35	QB

=== Finals ===
==== Final B ====
Rank	Rowers	Coxswain	Nation	Time
7	Ferenc Kiss; Péter Tóvári; Róbert Sass; Attila Strochmayer; András Kormos; Zoltán Sztárcsevics; Kálmán Toronyi; László Kiss	Miklós Bálint	Hungary	5:57.61
8	Wenceslao Borroto; Ismael Carbonell; Juan Alfonso; Juan Bueno; Francisco Mora; Hermenegildo Palacio; Jorge Álvarez; Antonio Riaño	Enrique Carrillo	Cuba	6:14.98
—	Paweł Borkowski; Wiesław Kujda; Grzegorz Stellak; Adam Tomasiak; Grzegorz Nowak; Ryszard Stadniuk; Mirosław Kowalewski; Władysław Beszterda	Ryszard Kubiak	Poland	DNS

==== Final A ====
Rank	Rowers	Coxswain	Nation	Time
1st place, gold medalist(s)	Bernd Krauß; Hans-Peter Koppe; Ulrich Kons; Jörg Friedrich; Jens Doberschütz; Ulrich Karnatz; Uwe Dühring; Bernd Höing	Klaus-Dieter Ludwig	East Germany	5:49.05
2nd place, silver medalist(s)	Duncan McDougall; Allan Whitwell; Henry Clay; Chris Mahoney; Andrew Justice; John Pritchard; Malcolm McGowan; Richard Stanhope	Colin Moynihan	Great Britain	5:51.92
3rd place, bronze medalist(s)	Viktor Kokoshyn; Andriy Tishchenko; Oleksandr Tkachenko; Jonas Pinskus; Jonas Narmontas; Andrey Luhin; Oleksandr Mantsevych; Ihar Maystrenka	Hryhoriy Dmytrenko	Soviet Union	5:52.66
4	Pavel Pevný; Lubomír Janko; Ctirad Jungmann; Karel Neffe; Karel Mejta Jr; Dušan Vičík; Milan Doleček; Milan Kyselý	Jiří Pták	Czechoslovakia	5:53.73
5	Islay Lee; Steve Handley; Bill Dankbaar; Andrew Withers; Tim Willoughby; James Lowe; Tim Young; Brian Richardson	David England	Australia	5:56.74
6	Dimitar Yanakiev; Todor Mrankov; Bozhidar Rangelov; Ivan Botev; Yani Ignatov; Mikhail Petrov; Petar Patsev; Veselin Shterev	Ventseslav Kanchev	Bulgaria	6:04.05

== Sources ==
- The Official Report of the Games of the XXII Olympiad Moscow 1980 Volume Three (PDF) (PDF). pp. 112–113. Archived from the original (PDF) on 27 September 2007.
