= Kokoshin =

Kokoshin or Kokoshyn (Russian and Ukrainian: Кокошин) is a surname. Notable people with the surname include:

- Andrei Kokoshin (born 1945), Soviet and Russian statesman, political scientist and historian, Americanist
- Viktor Kokoshyn (born 1957), Soviet and Ukrainian former rower
