= Ferenc Kiss =

Ferenc Kiss is the name of:

- Ferenc Kiss (actor) (1892–1978), Hungarian actor
- Ferenc Kiss (athlete) (born 1955), Hungarian sprinter
- Ferenc Kiss (rower) (born 1956), Hungarian rower
- Ferenc Kiss (wrestler) (1942–2015), Hungarian wrestler
