= Shterev =

Shterev (Bulgarian: Щерев) is a Bulgarian masculine surname, its feminine counterpart is Shtereva. Notable people with the surname include:

- Nikola Shterev (1903–1972), Bulgarian football player and coach
- Nikolina Shtereva (born 1955), Bulgarian middle-distance runner
- Simeon Shterev (born 1959), Bulgarian wrestler
- Svilen Shterev, Bulgarian footballer
- Vanya Shtereva (born 1970), Bulgarian singer and writer
- Veselin Shterev, Bulgarian rower
