= Yani Ignatov =

Bulgarian rower

Personal information
- Nationality: Bulgarian
- Born: 12 December 1959 (age 65)

Sport
- Sport: Rowing

Yani Ignatov (Bulgarian: Яни Игнатов, born 12 December 1959) is a Bulgarian rower. He competed in the men's eight event at the 1980 Summer Olympics.
