= Bozhidar Rangelov =

Bulgarian rower

Personal information
- Nationality: Bulgarian
- Born: 15 April 1955 (age 69)

Sport
- Sport: Rowing

Bozhidar Rangelov (Bulgarian: Божидар Рангелов, born 15 April 1955) is a Bulgarian rower. He competed in the men's eight event at the 1980 Summer Olympics.
