= Péter Tóvári =

Hungarian rower (born 1951)

Personal information
- Nationality: Hungarian
- Born: 31 October 1951 (age 73); Győr, Hungary

Sport
- Sport: Rowing

Péter Tóvári (born 31 October 1951) is a Hungarian rower. He competed in the men's eight event at the 1980 Summer Olympics.
