= Attila Strochmayer =

Hungarian rower

Personal information
- Nationality: Hungarian
- Born: 7 February 1962 (age 63); Budapest, Hungary

Sport
- Sport: Rowing

Attila Strochmayer (born 7 February 1962) is a Hungarian rower. He competed in the men's eight event at the 1980 Summer Olympics.
