= Jiří Pták =

Czech Olympic rower (1946–2026)

Personal information
- Born: 24 March 1946 Děčín, Czechoslovakia
- Died: 5 July 2026 (aged 80)
- Height: 172 cm (5 ft 8 in)
- Weight: 52 kg (115 lb)

Sport
- Sport: Rowing
Medal record
Representing Czechoslovakia
Men's rowing
World Championships
Bronze medal – third place	1977 Amsterdam	Coxed pair
European Rowing Championships
Silver medal – second place	1973 Moscow	Eight

Jiří Pták (24 March 1946 – 5 July 2026) was a Czech rowing coxswain who competed for Czechoslovakia at six Olympic Games between 1968 and 1992 (except the 1984 Olympics, boycotted by the Eastern Bloc countries).

Pták was the first rower to compete at six Olympics. He was the third rower, after Briton Jack Beresford and Soviet Yuriy Lorentsson, to compete at five Olympics. (From 1896 to 2020, 26 rowers have competed at five Olympics and 8 at six Olympics.)

His best performance was fourth in the eight at the 1980 Moscow Olympics, when his team lost out on bronze by 1.09 seconds.

Pták died on 5 July 2026, at the age of 80.

== See also ==
- List of athletes with the most appearances at Olympic Games
