= Władysław Beszterda =

Polish rower

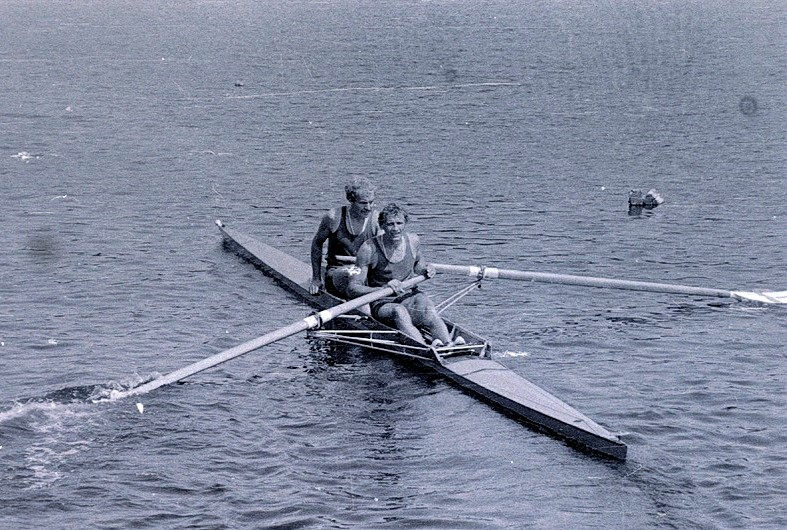
- Mirosław Jarzembowski & Władysław Beszterda, 1982

Personal information
- Nationality: Polish
- Born: 28 September 1951 (age 73); Gdańsk, Poland

Sport
- Sport: Rowing

Władysław Beszterda (born 28 September 1951) is a Polish rower. He competed in the men's eight event at the 1980 Summer Olympics.
