= Andrew Withers =

Australian rower

Personal information
- Nationality: Australian
- Born: 5 February 1957 (age 68)

Sport
- Sport: Rowing
- Club: Mercantile Rowing Club

Achievements and titles
- Olympic finals: 1980 Moscow M8+
- National finals: King's Cup 6 times (1975–81)

Andrew Withers (born 5 February 1957) is an Australian and a former representative rower. He was a four time national champion, represented at the 1978 and the 1979 World Rowing Championships and he competed in the men's eight event at the 1980 Summer Olympics.

== School, club & state rowing ==
Withers was educated at Melbourne Grammar School where he took up rowing, He rowed in that school's first VIII in both of his senior years of 1973 and 1974. The 1974 Melbourne Grammar eight won the national schoolboy eight title at that year's Australian Rowing Championships. His senior club rowing was from the Mercantile Rowing Club.

Victorian state representative honours first came for Withers in 1975 when aged just 18 he was selected into the Victorian men's senior eight which contested the King's Cup at the annual Interstate Regatta. He made six King's Cup appearances for Victoria between 1975 and 1981 and saw victories in 1979 and 1980.

He twice stroked Mercantile coxless fours to senior national championship titles - in 1980 and 1981, and in both those years also won silver medals in the coxed four event at stroke.

== International representative rowing ==
Withers made his Australian representative debut in 1978 when selected in the coxed four to race at the 1978 World Rowing Championships on Lake Karapiro. That crew performed well, placing second in their heat then making it through the repechage to the A final where they finished in fifth place. For the 1979 World Rowing Championships in Bled, the strong Victorian showing in that year's King's Cup saw Withers amongst a number of Victorians selected into the Australian men's eight. An injury during the campaign to Rob Lang resulted in the squad's selected sculler Ted Hale stepping into the five seat of the eight. That crew placed third in their semi-final and fourth in the final.

For the 1980 Moscow Olympics the new Australian Director of Coaching Reinhold Batschi utilised small boating racing criteria and selected an eight with rowers from three states including Withers in the five seat. The Australian eight finished in fifth place in the Olympic final. He rowed on in 1981 to state and national success but the 1980 Olympic eight was Withers' last Australian representative appearance.

== Personal ==
Withers married fellow 1980 Australian rowing Olympian Sally Harding.
