= Zoltán Sztárcsevics =

Hungarian rower (1959–2011)

Personal information
- Nationality: Hungarian
- Born: 19 August 1959; Pécs, Hungary
- Died: 17 June 2011 (aged 51)

Sport
- Sport: Rowing

Zoltán Sztárcsevics (19 August 1959 – 17 June 2011) was a Hungarian rower. He competed in the men's eight event at the 1980 Summer Olympics.
