= Mirosław Kowalewski =

Polish rower

Personal information
- Nationality: Polish
- Born: 12 April 1952 (age 74) Szczecin, Poland

Sport
- Sport: Rowing

Mirosław Kowalewski (born 12 April 1952) is a Polish rower. He competed in the men's eight event at the 1980 Summer Olympics.
