= The Boat Race 1986 =

132nd Boat Race
- Date: 29 March 1986
- Winner: Cambridge
- Margin of victory: 7 lengths
- Winning time: 17 minutes 58 seconds
- Overall record (Cambridge–Oxford): 69–62
- Umpire: Mike Sweeney (Cambridge)

Other races
- Reserve winner: Isis
- Women's winner: Oxford

The 132nd Boat Race took place on 29 March 1986. Held annually, the Boat Race is a side-by-side rowing race between crews from the Universities of Oxford and Cambridge along the River Thames. Cambridge won by seven lengths and took their first victory in eleven years, in one of the fastest winning times in the history of the event. Isis won the reserve race, while Oxford were victorious in the Women's Boat Race.

== Background ==
The Boat Race is a side-by-side rowing competition between the University of Oxford (sometimes referred to as the "Dark Blues") and the University of Cambridge (sometimes referred to as the "Light Blues"). First held in 1829, the race takes place on the 4.2-mile (6.8 km) Championship Course on the River Thames in southwest London. The rivalry is a major point of honour between the two universities and followed throughout the United Kingdom and broadcast worldwide. Oxford went into the race as reigning champions, having beaten Cambridge by 4 3/4 lengths in the previous year's race. However Cambridge held the overall lead, with 68 victories to Oxford's 62 (excluding the "dead heat" of 1877) despite Oxford having won the previous ten races.

The first Women's Boat Race took place in 1927, but did not become an annual fixture until the 1960s. Up until 2014, the contest was conducted as part of the Henley Boat Races, but as of the 2015 race, it is held on the River Thames, on the same day as the men's main and reserve races. The reserve race, contested between Oxford's Isis boat and Cambridge's Goldie boat has been held since 1965. It usually takes place on the Tideway, prior to the main Boat Race.

The race was sponsored by Ladbrokes for the tenth consecutive year, estimated to be worth about £30,000 to each boat club, and was umpired by former Cambridge rower Mike Sweeney.

== Crews ==
The Oxford crew weighed an average of over 5 pounds (2.3 kg) per rower more than Cambridge. Cambridge's crew featured only two rowers over the age of 24 while Oxford had just three men under 25. Oxford saw three Blues return while Cambridge welcomed back four. The Cambridge crew featured three international rowers: two Canadians (Gibson and Wilson), and the American Pew. The Light Blue cox, Carole Burton, was the first woman to steer the Cambridge boat. Oxford's MacDonald was the oldest in the race at the age of 30, he was accompanied in the boat by international rowers Clark and Livingstone from the United States and Jones from Australia. Dan Topolski was the Oxford coach while Cambridge relied on Alan Inns and Canadian Olympic coach Neil Campbell. Cambridge were clear favourites to win, but prior to the race, Topolski claimed his crew had "pulled themselves back into contention by sheer hard work."

Seat	Oxford			Cambridge		
Seat	Name	College	Weight	Name	College	Weight
Bow	G R Screaton	Merton	13 st 7 lb	I R Clarke	Fitzwilliam	12 st 9 lb
2	D H M Macdonald	Mansfield	13 st 12 lb	M Wilson	Trinity Hall	12 st 9 lb
3	M R Dunstan	Worcester	13 st 7 lb	J D Hughes	Downing	13 st 10 lb
4	G R D Jones	New College	13 st 11 lb	J S Pew	1st and 3rd Trinity	15 st 1 lb
5	B M Philp (P)	Worcester	15 st 9 lb	S M Peel	Downing	14 st 0 lb
6	C G H Clark	University	14 st 13 lb	P M Broughton	Magdalene	13 st 11 lb
7	G A Livingston	Oriel	14 st 1 lb	E A F Gibson	Churchill	13 st 4 lb
Stroke	A M S Thomas	Pembroke	13 st 13 lb	J M Pritchard	Robinson	14 st 1 lb
Cox	A S Green	Christ Church	7 st 12 lb	C A Burton	Fitzwilliam	6 st 9 lb
Source: (P) – boat club president (Cambridge had a non-rowing president in Quintus Travis).

== Races ==
The Championship Course

Oxford won the toss and elected to start from the Surrey station. The predicted severe wind did not materialise and from the start, Cambridge pulled ahead. A half-length lead by the end of Putney boathouses became a two length lead by Hammersmith Bridge, and Cambridge's cox Burton steered towards the safer Surrey side, extending Cambridge's lead to 14 seconds by Chiswick Steps. Continuing to pull away, Cambridge passed the finishing post 21 seconds and seven lengths ahead of Oxford. It was the sixth fastest time in the history of the race. This was Cambridge's first victory in eleven years and took the overall record to 69–62 in favour of Cambridge.

In the reserve race, Oxford's Isis beat Cambridge's Goldie by six lengths, while Oxford won the 41st Women's Boat Race.

== Reaction ==
The trophy was presented by former Cambridge student Prince Edward. Cambridge stroke John Pritchard said "After our initial start we built up for 20 strokes, steadied and then just grinded away." He added "I was just stirring the tea while the others did the work." Cambridge cox Carole Burton noted "I went where I wanted to go." Following tradition, Pritchard picked her up and threw her into the river. Oxford's Jones remarked "we were as well prepared as last year but we found no magic." Topolski conceded that even had Oxford been at their best, they would still have lost the race.
