= Tim Young (Australian rower) =

Australian rower (born 1956)

Timothy Young
Personal information
- Nationality: Australian
- Born: 11 August 1956 (age 69)

Sport
- Sport: Rowing
- Club: Monash Uni Rowing Club

Achievements and titles
- Olympic finals: 1980 Moscow M8+
- National finals: King's Cup 3 times (1977–80)

Timothy James Young (born 11 August 1956) is an Australian former Olympic representative rower. He was twice an Australian national champion, represented twice at World Championships and competed in the men's eight event at the 1980 Summer Olympics.

== Club and state rowing ==
Young's senior club rowing was from the Monash University Rowing Club. In 1978 he stroked the Monash senior VIII which won the men's eight championship at that year's Australian University Rowing Championships.

State representative honours first came for Young in 1974 when was selected to represent Victoria as the men's youth eight contesting the Noel Wilkinson Trophy at the Interstate Regatta within the Australian Rowing Championships. That crew placed third. In 1976 Young moved into the Victorian men's senior eight which contested the King's Cup at the annual Interstate Regatta. He made three King's Cup appearances for Victoria between 1976 and 1980 and saw victories in 1979 and 1980.

== International representative rowing ==
Young made his Australian representative debut in 1978 when selected in a coxless four to race at the 1978 World Rowing Championships on Lake Karapiro. That crew finished in ninth place. For the 1979 World Rowing Championships in Bled, the strong Victorian showing in that year's King's Cup saw Young amongst a number of Victorians selected into the Australian men's eight. An injury during the campaign to Rob Lang resulted in the squad's selected sculler Ted Hale stepping into the five seat of the eight. That crew placed third in their semi-final and fourth in the final.

For the 1980 Moscow Olympics the new Australian Director of Coaching Reinhold Batschi utilised small boating racing criteria and selected an eight with rowers from three states including Young in the seven seat. The Australian eight finished in fifth place in the Olympic final. It was Young's last Australian representative appearance.

== Personal ==
Young married fellow 1980 Australian rowing Olympian Anne Chirnside. He practised as a solicitor. For a period they owned the historic rural property Mouyong in the Little River area. The property had historical connections to earlier generations of the Chirnside family.
