= Ctirad Jungmann =

Czech rower

Personal information
- Nationality: Czech
- Born: 20 May 1959 (age 65); Prague, Czechoslovakia

Sport
- Sport: Rowing

Ctirad Jungmann (born 20 May 1959) is a Czech rower. He competed in the men's eight event at the 1980 Summer Olympics.
