= Róbert Sass =

Hungarian rower (born 1959)

Personal information
- Nationality: Hungarian
- Born: 27 October 1959 (age 66) Budapest, Hungary

Sport
- Sport: Rowing

Róbert Sass (born 27 October 1959) is a Hungarian rower. He competed in the men's eight event at the 1980 Summer Olympics.
