= Bill Dankbaar =

Australian rower

Personal information
- Full name: William Dankbaar
- Nationality: Australian
- Born: 7 November 1952; Adelaide, Australia
- Died: 4 March 2013 (aged 60); Sydney, Australia
- Height: 194 cm (6 ft 4 in)
- Weight: 92 kg (203 lb)

Sport
- Sport: Rowing

William Dankbaar (7 November 1952 – 4 March 2013) was an Australian rower. He competed in the men's eight event at the 1980 Summer Olympics.
