= The Boat Race 1979 =

125th Boat Race
- Date: 17 March 1979
- Winner: Oxford
- Margin of victory: 3 1/2 lengths
- Winning time: 20 minutes 33 seconds
- Overall record (Cambridge–Oxford): 68–56
- Umpire: Ronnie Howard (Oxford)

Other races
- Reserve winner: Goldie
- Women's winner: Cambridge

The 125th Boat Race took place on 17 March 1979. Held annually, the event is a side-by-side rowing race between crews from the Universities of Oxford and Cambridge along the River Thames. The 150th anniversary race was won by Oxford by 3 1/2 lengths. For the first time in 50 years, neither crew featured foreign rowers, while Cambridge's stroke was replaced just hours before the race. Goldie won the reserve race in the slowest time in the history of the race while Cambridge won the Women's Boat Race.

== Background ==
The Boat Race is a side-by-side rowing competition between the University of Oxford (sometimes referred to as the "Dark Blues") and the University of Cambridge (sometimes referred to as the "Light Blues"). The race was first held in 1829, and since 1845 has taken place on the 4.2-mile (6.8 km) Championship Course on the River Thames in southwest London. The rivalry is a major point of honour between the two universities, as of 2014 it is followed throughout the United Kingdom and broadcast worldwide. Oxford went into the race as reigning champions, having won the 1978 race after Cambridge sank. Cambridge, however, led overall with 68 victories to Oxford's 55 (excluding the "dead heat" of 1877). The race was sponsored for the third consecutive year by Ladbrokes. Former Oxford Blue Ronnie Howard was the umpire for the race. To allow for television viewing, the start time of the race (2 p.m.) was an hour earlier than the traditional flood tide.

The first Women's Boat Race took place in 1927, but did not become an annual fixture until the 1960s. Up until 2014, the contest was conducted as part of the Henley Boat Races, but as of the 2015 race, it is held on the River Thames, on the same day as the men's main and reserve races. The reserve race, contested between Oxford's Isis boat and Cambridge's Goldie boat has been held since 1965. It usually takes place on the Tideway, prior to the main Boat Race.

Oxford were being coached for the sixth consecutive time by Daniel Topolski who had himself rowed in the 1967 and 1968 races. As coach, Topolski had suffered just one defeat. Cambridge's head coach was Czechoslovak former international rower Bohumil Janoušek; although a double Olympic medallist, he was still cautious of the event: "It's a peculiar race. The distance, the bends, the fact that only two crews race, the fact that during the course you encounter all sorts of water and wind conditions." Janoušek had been employed in order to prevent Cambridge losing for the fourth consecutive time, an occurrence which last took place following the 1912 race. Preparations for the race were hampered by appalling weather conditions: horizontal sleet and snow made practice rows challenging.

== Crews ==
Both crews weighed an average of 13 st 4 lb (84.2 kg); Henderson, the Cambridge cox weighed 13 pounds (5.9 kg) more than his Dark Blue counterpart. In the week leading up to the race however, Cambridge's Andy Grey was struck down by gastroenteritis. While he recovered, his roommate John Woodhouse became ill and withdrew from the race three hours prior to the event. Woodhouse was replaced by Graham Phillips (who weighed 8 pounds (4 kg) less than Woodhouse) and the Light Blue boat was reorganised, with Phillips rowing at three and Nick Davies moving to stroke. Oxford's crew contained four returning Blues, with Boris Rankov making the second of what would become six appearances in the race. Cambridge welcomed back four Blue rowers and the cox Henderson, all of whom had rowed the previous year.

Peter Berners-Lee, one of the coxes, was the brother of Sir Tim Berners-Lee.

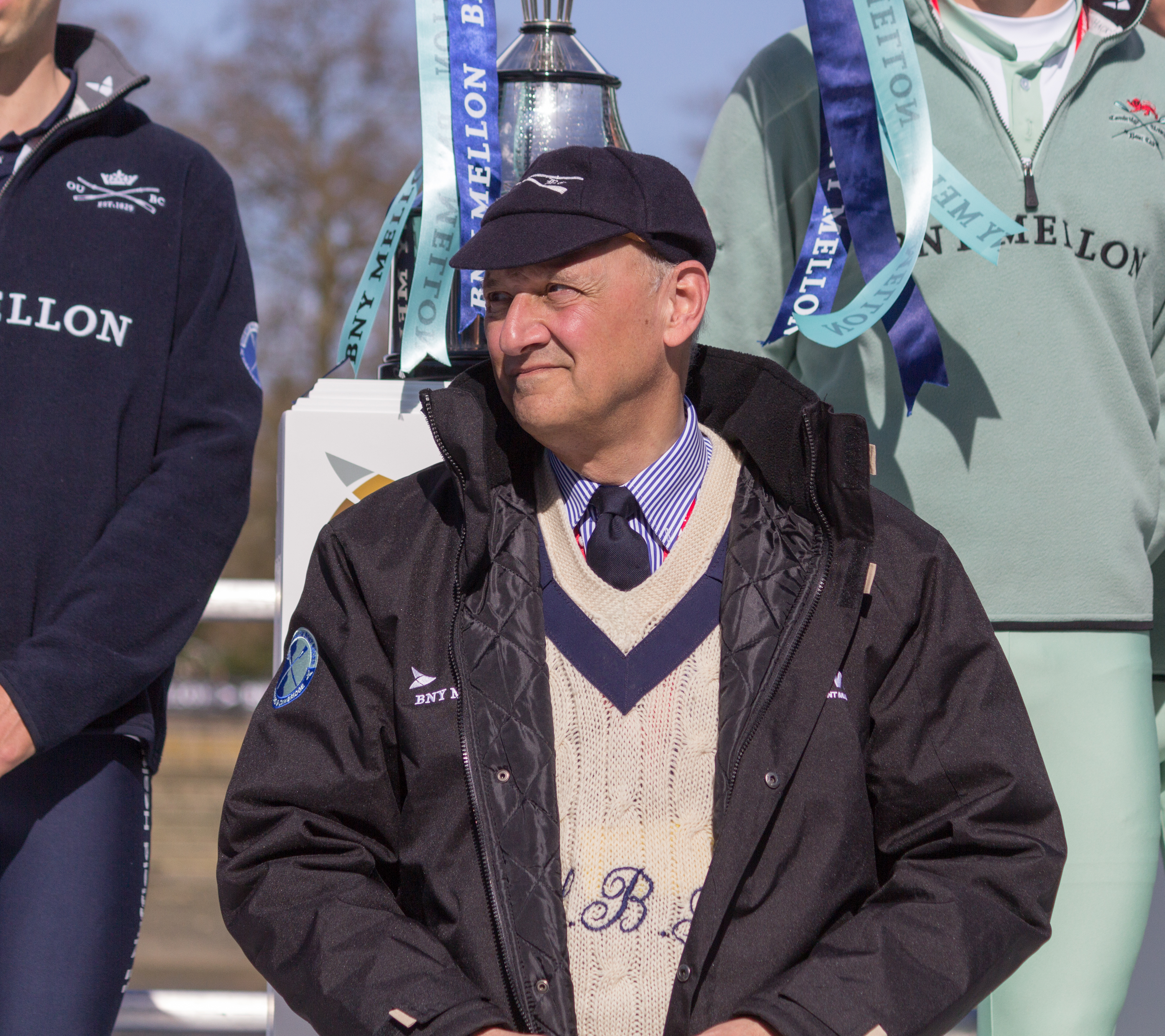
Boris Rankov (pictured in 2015) made the second of his six appearances for Oxford.

Seat	Oxford			Cambridge		
Seat	Name	College	Weight	Name	College	Weight
Bow	P. J. Head	Oriel	12 st 4 lb	S. J. Clegg	St Catharine's	13 st 0 lb
2	R. A. Crockford	Corpus Christi	13 st 4 lb	A. H. Grey	Pembroke	13 st 1 lb
3	R. J. Moore	St Edmund	13 st 3 lb	A. G. Phillips	Jesus	12 st 12 lb
4	N. B. Rankov	Corpus Christi	14 st 5 lb	J. S. Palmer	Pembroke	14 st 2 lb
5	J. R. Crawford	Pembroke	14 st 0 lb	A. N. de M. Jelfs	Fitzwilliam	13 st 4 lb
6	C. J. Mahoney	Oriel	13 st 4 lb	P. W. Cross	Downing	12 st 11 lb
7	A. J. Wiggins	Keble	13 st 4 lb	R. C. Ross	Lady Margaret Boat Club	14 st 4 lb
Stroke	M. J. Diserens	Keble	12 st 9 lb	R. N. E. Davies ‡	St Catharine's	13 st 5 lb
Cox	C. P. Berners-Lee	Wadham	7 st 9 lb	G. Henderson	Downing	8 st 8 lb
Source: (P) – boat club president ‡ – John Woodhouse was replaced by Graham Phillips on the day of the race.

== Race ==
The Championship Course along which the Boat Race is contested

Oxford won the toss (for the fifth consecutive year) and elected to start from the Surrey station. Conditions were calm – Desmond Hill writing in The Daily Telegraph described the river as "glassy" – and the tide, as a result of the earlier start time, was very weak. Within a minute of the start Oxford were clear of Cambridge and held a lead of two lengths by Craven Cottage. They passed the Mile Post five seconds ahead, and extended their lead to eight seconds by the time the crews shot Hammersmith Bridge. Davies brought two pushes out of the Light Blues at Chiswick Eyot but Oxford maintained their lead and passed the finishing post in 20 minutes 33 seconds, 3 1/2 lengths ahead of Cambridge. It was Oxford's fourth consecutive victory and their fifth in six years.

Taking place 30 minutes before the main race, the reserve race saw Cambridge's Goldie defeat Oxford's Isis by twelve lengths and thirty seconds. As of 2014, the winning time of 22 minutes 50 seconds is the slowest time in the history of the event. It was Goldie's third consecutive victory, and their eleventh in thirteen years. Cambridge won the 34th Women's Boat Race, making it their third in a row, and their sixteenth victory in seventeen years.

== Reaction ==
Oxford cox, Peter Berners-Lee suggested: "I got some help from the tide at the beginning, but very little later. I was expecting a neck-and-neck race and I couldn't believe we were a length up at Fulham."
