= Women's Boat Race 1979 =

34th Women's Boat Race
- Date: 25 March 1979
- Winner: Cambridge
- Margin of victory: 2 lengths
- Winning time: 5 minutes 52 seconds
- Overall record (Cambridge–Oxford): 23–11

The 34th Women's Boat Race took place on 25 March 1979. The contest was between crews from the Universities of Oxford and Cambridge and held as part of the Henley Boat Races along a two-kilometre course.

== Background ==
The first Women's Boat Race was conducted on The Isis in 1927.

== Crews ==
The Cambridge crew weighed an average of 10 st 12.75 lb (69.1 kg) per rower, 7.25 pounds (3.3 kg) more than their opponents. Oxford saw three rowers with Boat Race experience return to the crew while Cambridge's crew featured two Blues.

Seat	Oxford		Cambridge	
Seat	Name	College	Name	College
Bow	S. Whitley	Somerville	L. Mayo	Sidney Sussex
2	A. Stilsbury	St Hugh's	A. Borthwick	Girton
3	D. Shanzer	Corpus Christi	H. Boutwood	Newnham
4	P. Janson	St Hilda's	C. Whalley	Selwyn
5	H. Butley	Corpus Christi	F. Morrison	Selwyn
6	S. Heal	St Hugh's	P. Sweet	Clare
7	E. Kiestling	Wadham	A. Thomas	Clare
Stroke	E. Sharpston	Corpus Christi	S. Stoughton-Harris	Newnham
Cox	S. Lincoln	St Catherine's	L. Goleby	Sidney Sussex

== Race ==
Cambridge won by two lengths in a time of 5 minutes 52 seconds.

== See also ==
- The Boat Race 1979
