= Petar Patsev =

Bulgarian rower

Personal information
- Nationality: Bulgarian
- Born: 21 October 1957 (age 67)

Sport
- Sport: Rowing

Petar Patsev (Bulgarian: Петър Пацев, born 21 October 1957) is a Bulgarian rower. He competed in the men's eight event at the 1980 Summer Olympics.
