= Kálmán Toronyi =

Hungarian rower

Personal information
- Nationality: Hungarian
- Born: 17 November 1955 (age 69); Budapest, Hungary

Sport
- Sport: Rowing

Kálmán Toronyi (born 17 November 1955) is a Hungarian rower. He competed in the men's eight event at the 1980 Summer Olympics.
