= Lubomír Janko =

Czech rower

Personal information
- Nationality: Czech
- Born: 13 November 1955 (age 69); Brno, Czechoslovakia

Sport
- Sport: Rowing

Lubomír Janko (born 13 November 1955) is a Czech rower. He competed in the men's eight event at the 1980 Summer Olympics.
