= Paweł Borkowski =

Polish rower

Personal information
- Nationality: Polish
- Born: 7 June 1959 (age 65); Toruń, Poland

Sport
- Sport: Rowing

Paweł Borkowski (born 7 June 1959) is a Polish rower. He competed in the men's eight event at the 1980 Summer Olympics.
