= Miklós Bálint =

Hungarian rower

Personal information
- Nationality: Hungarian
- Born: 4 December 1957 (age 68) Budapest, Hungary

Sport
- Sport: Rowing

Miklós Bálint (born 4 December 1957) is a Hungarian rower. He competed in the men's eight event at the 1980 Summer Olympics.
