= Dietmar Schiller =

German rower

Medal record

Representing East Germany

Friendship Games
Bronze medal – third place	1984 Moscow	Coxed pair

World Rowing Championships
Gold medal – first place	1979 Bled	Eight
Silver medal – second place	1981 Munich	Eight
Silver medal – second place	1983 Duisburg	Coxed four
Bronze medal – third place	1985 Hazewinkel	Coxed four

Dietmar Schiller is a German rower who competed for the SG Dynamo Potsdam / Sportvereinigung (SV) Dynamo. He won the medals at the international rowing competitions.
