= László Kiss (rower) =

Hungarian rower

Personal information
- Nationality: Hungarian
- Born: 17 May 1951; Budapest, Hungary
- Died: 15 July 2016 (aged 65)

Sport
- Sport: Rowing

László Kiss (17 May 1951 – 15 July 2016) was a Hungarian rower. He competed in the men's eight event at the 1980 Summer Olympics.
