= Gordana Jovanović Doleček =

Yugoslav-Mexican electronic engineer

Gordana Jovanović Doleček (born 1946) is a Yugoslav-Mexican electronics engineer specializing in digital filters. She is originally from Yugoslavia, but from 1995 she works in Mexico as a professor and researcher at the National Institute of Astrophysics, Optics and Electronics (INAOE) in Puebla.

== Life and career ==
Gordana Jovanović was born in 1946 in Šabac in Yugoslavia (now Serbia). She was married to mechanical engineering professor Vlatko Doleček. Their daughter, coding theorist Lara Dolecek, is a professor in California at the UCLA Henry Samueli School of Engineering and Applied Science.

Doleček earned a bachelor's degree in electrical engineering from the University of Sarajevo in 1969. After a master's degree from the University of Belgrade in 1975, she returned to the University of Sarajevo for her Ph.D., completed in 1981.

She worked as a research assistant at Energoinvest in 1969 and 1971 became a teaching and research assistant at the University of Sarajevo. She became an assistant professor there in 1977, one of the founding members of the Department of Telecommunications. She was promoted to associate professor in 1985 and full professor in 1991. She alternately chaired the telecommunications and communications systems departments from 1980 to 1993.

In 1993, she moved to the Mihajlo Pupin Institute of the University of Belgrade, and in 1995 she took the position of a professor and researcher at INAOE in Mexico.

== Books ==
Doleček is the author of the book Random Signals and Processes Primer with MATLAB (Springer, 2012). Her edited volumes include Multirate Systems: Design and Applications (Idea Group, 2002) and Advances in Multirate Systems (Springer, 2017).

== Recognition ==
Doleček is a member of the Mexican Academy of Sciences, elected in 2005.
