= Milan Kyselý =

Czech rower

Personal information
- Nationality: Czech
- Born: 16 March 1955 (age 70); Prague, Czechoslovakia
- Height: 187 cm (6 ft 2 in)
- Weight: 83 kg (183 lb)

Sport
- Sport: Rowing

Milan Kyselý (born 16 March 1955) is a Czech rower. He competed in the men's eight event at the 1980 Summer Olympics.
