= John Pritchard (rower) =

British rower (born 1957)

Personal information
- Born: John Martin Pritchard; 30 November 1957 (age 68) London
- Height: 188 cm (6 ft 2 in)
- Weight: 86 kg (190 lb)

Sport
- Sport: Rowing
- Club: Thames Rowing Club; Cambridge University Boat Club
Medal record
Men's rowing
Representing Great Britain
Silver medal – second place	1980 Moscow	Eight
World Rowing Championships
Silver medal – second place	1981 Munich	Eight

John Martin Pritchard (born 30 November 1957) is a British rower who competed in the 1980 Summer Olympics, winning a silver medal, and the 1984 Summer Olympics.

Pritchard was born in Fulham, South West London. His father, John William Pritchard, served as a Detective Chief Superintendent and had a notable career as an investigating officer in the Great Train Robbery case in 1963.

He attended Halford Road Primary school in Fulham and later St Clement Danes Grammar School on Ducane Road in Hammersmith from 1969 to 1975. From 1983 to 1986, he studied law at Robinson College, Cambridge. During his time at Cambridge, he served as the President of the Hawks' Club, following in the footsteps of Rob Andrew, the former England Rugby player.

In 1980, he was a crew member of the British eight that won the Olympic silver medal. In 1981, he won a silver medal at the World Rowing Championships in Munich. He finished fifth with the British eight in the 1984 Olympics.

He coached the Oxford University Boat Club in 1980 and 1981, and the Cambridge University Boat Club in 1982 and 1983. He rowed in The Boat Race three times for Cambridge against Oxford. In the 1984 race, the crew in which he rowed famously hit a barge moored above Putney Bridge resulting in the much-broadcast image of a sinking boat. The win in the 1986 race was the only Cambridge win in a run of 17 wins for Oxford. By winning in 1986, Cambridge denied Oxford winning the Ladbrokes trophy outright, having won for the previous nine years.

Pritchard founded and runs an executive search business, Piper Pritchard Associates, in London. He was a director of the British Olympic Association and is Chairman of Right To Play, an international charity which supports children in war-torn and deprived parts of the world through sport. He is Chairman of the Hawks' Club. He is also chairman of the steering committee and deputy chairman of the alumni advisory board of Cambridge University.

In 2014, he rowed the length of the Mississippi river in a traditional Thames racing skiff. The 2,320 mile journey took three months and raised over $1,000,000 for Right to Play.
