= Jörg Friedrich (rower) =

East German rower

Medal record

Men's rowing

Representing East Germany

Olympic Games
Gold medal – first place	1980 Moscow	Eight

Friendship Games
Silver medal – second place	1984 Moscow	Eight

World Rowing Championships
Silver medal – second place	1982 Lucerne	Eight

Jörg Friedrich (born 7 July 1959) is a German rower who competed for East Germany in the 1980 Summer Olympics.

He was born in Rathenow. In 1980, he won the gold medal as crew member of the East German boat in the men's eight competition.
