= Klaus-Dieter Ludwig =

East German coxswain

Personal information
- Born: 2 January 1943 Züllichau, Germany
- Died: 18 May 2016 (aged 73)
- Height: 170 cm (5 ft 7 in)
- Weight: 55 kg (121 lb)

Sport
- Sport: Rowing
Medal record
Men's rowing
Representing East Germany
Olympic Games
Gold medal – first place	1980 Moscow	Eight
Silver medal – second place	1972 Munich	Coxed four
Friendship Games
Silver medal – second place	1984 Moscow	Eight
World Rowing Championships
Gold medal – first place	1966 Bled	Coxed four
Gold medal – first place	1975 Nottingham	Eight
Gold medal – first place	1979 Bled	Eight
Gold medal – first place	1981 Munich	Coxed four
Silver medal – second place	1970 St. Catharines	Coxed pair
Silver medal – second place	1982 Lucerne	Eight
European Rowing Championships
Silver medal – second place	1973 Moscow	Coxed four

Klaus-Dieter Ludwig, known as Lucky in rowing circles (2 January 1943 – 18 May 2016), was a German coxswain who competed for East Germany in the 1972 Summer Olympics and in the 1980 Summer Olympics. He had a long rowing career and competed on the international stage for 19 seasons, retiring aged 41.

== Biography ==
He was born in 1943 in Züllichau, at the time located in Germany but since the end of World War II part of Poland. He started rowing in 1958 at age 15 but after two or three years, he became a coxswain instead. At 170 cm, he was tall for a cox but he suppressed hunger by heavy smoking to keep his weight at 55 kg, the minimum weight for that role. He competed for the SG Dynamo Potsdam / Sportvereinigung (SV) Dynamo.

Ludwig's first international race was at the 1966 World Rowing Championships in Bled where he won gold with the coxed four.

In 1972 he coxed the East German boat that won the gold medal in the coxed four event. In 1973 he won a silver medal at the European Rowing Championships in Moscow. At the 1980 Olympics he won the gold medal with the East German boat in the men's eight competition. He retired from competitive rowing—aged 41 and after 19 international rowing seasons—after winning silver with the men's eight at the 1984 Friendship Games, dubbed the "alternative Olympics".

Skipping meals, heavy smoking and alcohol consumption took a toll on Ludwig's health. He lived in a care facility since the end of 2015. Shortly before he died on 18 May 2016 he had his stomach removed.
