= Hryhoriy Dmytrenko =

Soviet rower

Personal information
- Born: Hryhoriy Mykolayovych Dmytrenko; 1 July 1945 (age 80) Sloboda-Vyazivka, Zhytomyr Oblast, Ukrainian SSR, Soviet Union
- Height: 152 cm (5 ft 0 in)
- Weight: 52 kg (115 lb)

Sport
- Sport: Rowing
Medal record
Olympic Games
Bronze medal – third place	1980 Moscow	Eight
World Rowing Championships
Silver medal – second place	1986 Nottingham	Eight
Bronze medal – third place	1979 Bled	Eight

Hryhoriy Mykolayovych Dmytrenko (Ukrainian: Григорій Миколайович Дмитренко, born 1 July 1945) is a Ukrainian former rower who competed for the Soviet Union in the 1980 Summer Olympics and for Ukraine in the 1996 Summer Olympics.

In 1980 he was the coxswain of the Soviet boat which won the bronze medal in the eights event. At the 1986 World Rowing Championships in Nottingham, he won a silver medal with the eight.

Twelve years later he coxed the Ukrainian boat which finished tenth in the 1996 eight competition.
