= Ryszard Stadniuk =

Polish rower (born 1951)

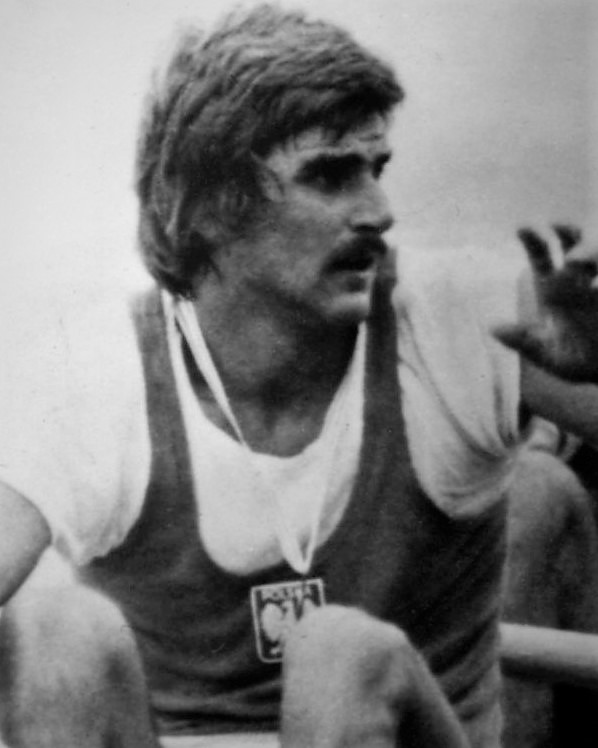
- Ryszard Stadniuk

Personal information
- Born: Ryszard Tadeusz Stadniuk; 27 October 1951 (age 74) Szczecin

Sport
- Sport: Rowing
Medal record
Men's rowing
Representing Poland
Olympic Games
Bronze medal – third place	1980 Moscow	Coxed four
World Rowing Championships
Silver medal – second place	1975 Nottingham	Coxed pair

Ryszard Tadeusz Stadniuk (born 27 October 1951) is a Polish rower who competed in the 1976 Summer Olympics and in the 1980 Summer Olympics.

He was born in Szczecin.

In 1976 he was a crew member of the Polish boat which finished sixth in the Coxed pair event.

Four years later he won the bronze medal with the Polish boat in the 1980 coxed fours competition. At the same Olympics he also competed with the Polish team in the 1980 eights contest and finished ninth.
