= Andrey Luhin =

Belarusian former rower (born 1959)

Medal record

Men's rowing

Representing Soviet Union

Olympic Games
Bronze medal – third place	1980 Moscow	Eight

World Rowing Championships
Bronze medal – third place	1979 Bled	Eight

Andrey Ivanavich Luhin (Belarusian: Андрэй Іванавіч Лугін, born 1 April 1959) is a Belarusian former rower who competed for the Soviet Union in the 1980 Summer Olympics.

In 1980, he was a crew member of the Soviet boat which won the bronze medal in the eights event.
