= Jens Doberschütz =

East German rower (born 1957)

Medal record

Men's rowing

Representing East Germany

Olympic Games
Gold medal – first place	1980 Moscow	Eight

World Rowing Championships
Silver medal – second place	1982 Lucerne	Eight

Jens Doberschütz (born 5 October 1957) is a German rower who competed for East Germany in the 1980 Summer Olympics.

He was born in Dresden and is the brother-in-law of Gerlinde Doberschütz and the father of Johannes Doberschütz. In 1980, he won the gold medal as crew member of the East German boat in the eight competition.
