= Mikhail Petrov (rower) =

Bulgarian rower

Personal information
- Nationality: Bulgarian
- Born: 11 June 1958 (age 66)

Sport
- Sport: Rowing

Mikhail Petrov (Bulgarian: Михаил Петров) (born 11 June 1958) is a Bulgarian rower. He competed in the men's eight event at the 1980 Summer Olympics.
