= Andriy Tishchenko =

Soviet rower

Medal record

Men's rowing

Representing Soviet Union

Olympic Games
Bronze medal – third place	1980 Moscow	Eight

World Rowing Championships
Bronze medal – third place	1979 Bled	Eight

Andriy Nestorovych Tishchenko (Ukrainian: Андрій Несторович Тищенко; born 3 April 1960, Kyiv) is a Ukrainian former rower who competed for the Soviet Union in the 1980 Summer Olympics.

In 1980 he was a crew member of the Soviet boat which won the bronze medal in the eights event.
