= Jonas Narmontas =

Lithuanian rower (born 1960)

Olympic medal record

Men's rowing

Representing the Soviet Union

Olympic Games
Bronze medal – third place	1980 Moscow	Eight

Friendship Games
Gold medal – first place	1984 Moscow	Coxless four

Jonas Narmontas (born 14 September 1960) is a Lithuanian former rower who competed for the Soviet Union in the 1980 Summer Olympics and in the 1988 Summer Olympics.

In 1980 he was a crew member of the Soviet boat which won the bronze medal in the eights event.

Eight years later he participated with the Soviet boat in the 1988 coxed fours competition but they did not start in the final B.
