= Ryszard Kubiak =

Polish rower (1950–2022)

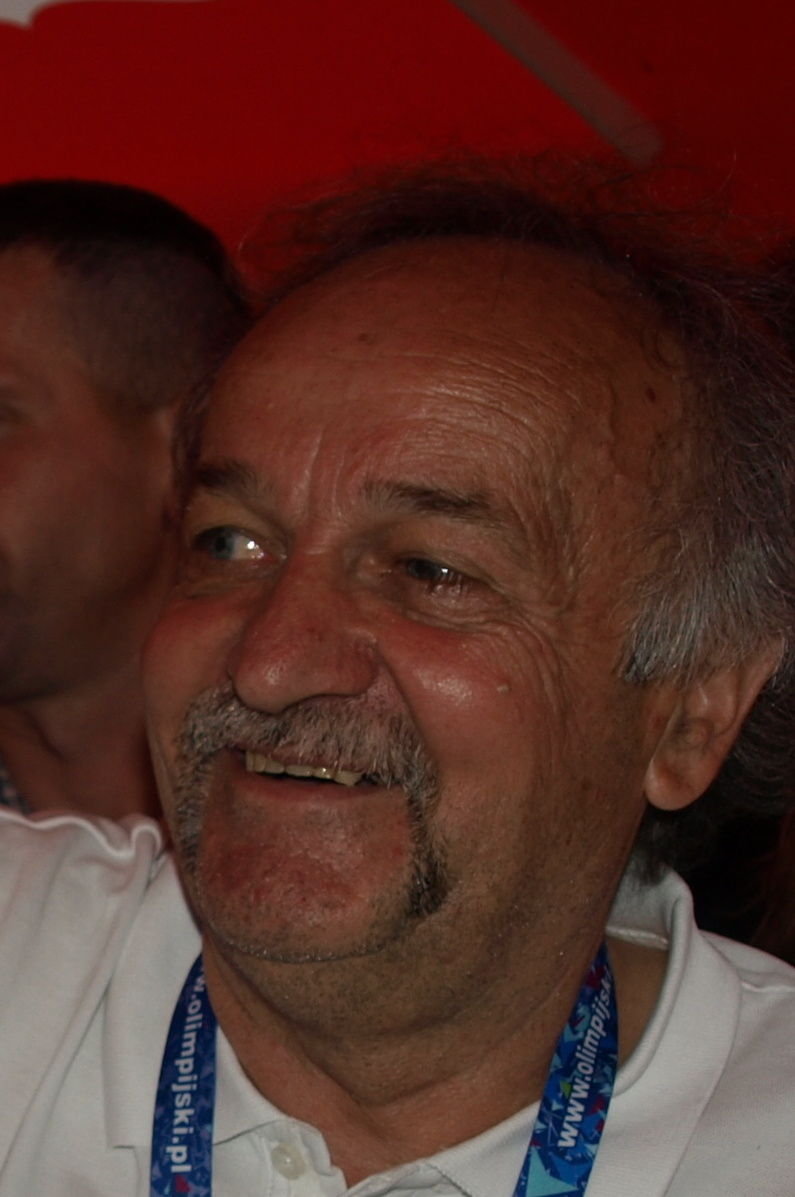

Personal information
- Born: 22 March 1950 Bydgoszcz, Poland
- Died: 6 February 2022 (aged 71)

Sport
- Sport: Rowing
Medal record
Men's rowing
Representing Poland
Olympic Games
Bronze medal – third place	1980 Moscow	Coxed four
World Rowing Championships
Silver medal – second place	1975 Nottingham	Coxed pair
Bronze medal – third place	1978 Lake Karapiro	Coxed pair

Ryszard Kubiak (22 March 1950 – 6 February 2022) was a Polish rowing coxswain who competed in the 1972 Summer Olympics, in the 1976 Summer Olympics, and in the 1980 Summer Olympics. He was born in Bydgoszcz.

In 1972 he was the coxswain of the Polish boat which finished sixth in the eight event. Four years later he finished sixth as cox of the Polish boat in the 1976 coxed pair competition. At the 1980 Games he coxed the Polish boat which won the bronze medal in the coxed fours contest. In the same Olympics he also coxed the Polish team in the 1980 eight event and finished ninth.

He died on 6 February 2022, at the age of 71.
