= Pavel Pevný =

Czech rower

Personal information
- Nationality: Czech
- Born: 14 July 1958 (age 66); Brno, Czechoslovakia

Sport
- Sport: Rowing

Pavel Pevný (born 14 July 1958) is a Czech rower. He competed in the men's eight event at the 1980 Summer Olympics.
