= Dušan Vičík =

Czech rower (born 1960)

Personal information
- Nationality: Czech
- Born: 18 December 1960 (age 64) Olomouc, Czechoslovakia

Sport
- Sport: Rowing

Dušan Vičík (born 18 December 1960) is a Czech rower. He competed in the men's eight event at the 1980 Summer Olympics.
