= Bernd Krauß =

German rower (born 1953)

Personal information
- Born: 15 June 1953 (age 73) Plauen
- Height: 192 cm (6 ft 4 in)
- Weight: 89 kg (196 lb)

Sport
- Sport: Rowing
- Club: SG Dynamo Potsdam
Medal record
Men's rowing
Representing East Germany
Olympic Games
Gold medal – first place	1980 Moscow	Eight
World Rowing Championships
Gold medal – first place	1979 Bled	Eight
Bronze medal – third place	1977 Amsterdam	Coxless pair

Bernd Krauß (born 15 June 1953) is a German rower, who competed for the SC Dynamo Potsdam / Sportvereinigung (SV) Dynamo. He won the medals at the international rowing competitions. Krauß went to the 1978 World Rowing Championships on Lake Karapiro in New Zealand as a reserve but did not compete.
