= Oleksandr Mantsevych =

Soviet rower

Olympic medal record

Men's rowing

Representing the Soviet Union
Bronze medal – third place	1980 Moscow	Eight

Oleksandr Vasylovych Mantsevych (Ukrainian: Олександр Васильович Манцевич, 1 June 1960 – 1 November 2000) was a Ukrainian rower who competed for the Soviet Union in the 1980 Summer Olympics. In 1980 he was a crew member of the Soviet boat which won the bronze medal in the eights event.
