= András Kormos =

Hungarian rower

Personal information
- Nationality: Hungarian
- Born: 3 April 1952; Győr, Hungary
- Died: 7 January 2005 (aged 52)

Sport
- Sport: Rowing

András Kormos (3 April 1952 – 7 January 2005) was a Hungarian rower. He competed at the 1972 Summer Olympics and the 1980 Summer Olympics.
