= Chris Mahoney (rower) =

British rower

Personal information
- Full name: Christopher John Mahoney
- National team: United Kingdom
- Born: 2 January 1959 (age 67) London
- Education: Oriel College, Oxford

Sport
- Country: United Kingdom
- Sport: Rowing
Medal record
Men's rowing
Representing United Kingdom
Olympic Games
Silver medal – second place	1980 Moscow	Men's eight
World Rowing Championships
Silver medal – second place	1981 Munich	Men's eight

Christopher John Mahoney (born 2 January 1959) is a British rower who competed in the 1976 and 1977 World Junior Championships, the 1980 Summer Olympics, the 1981 World Championships and the 1984 Summer Olympics.

He won a bronze medal at the 1977 World Junior Championships, silver in the 1980 Olympics and silver in the 1981 World Championships.

He was born in London. Mahoney studied at Oriel College, Oxford. He rowed in the 1979, 1980 and 1981 University Boat Races, winning all three. He was President of the OUBC in 1981.

He was a four time winner at Henley Royal Regatta including in the Grand Challenge Cup in 1981 and 1984.

Mahoney was the head of the agricultural division of Glencore PLC and subsequently CEO of Glencore Agriculture from 2002 until 2019.
