= Grzegorz Stellak =

Polish rower (1951–2023)

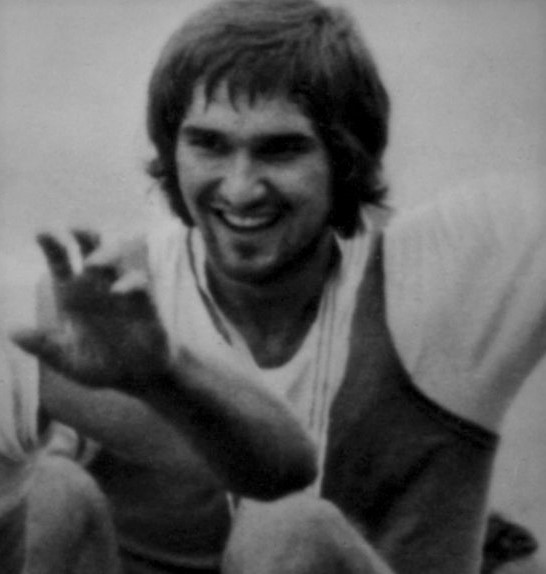
- Stellak in 1975

Personal information
- Born: Grzegorz Józef Stellak; 11 March 1951 Płock, Poland
- Died: 17 November 2023 (aged 72)

Sport
- Sport: Rowing
Medal record
Men's rowing
Representing Poland
Olympic Games
Bronze medal – third place	1980 Moscow	Coxed four
World Rowing Championships
Silver medal – second place	1975 Nottingham	Coxed pair

Grzegorz Józef Stellak (11 March 1951 – 17 November 2023) was a Polish rower who competed in the 1972 Summer Olympics, in the 1976 Summer Olympics, and in the 1980 Summer Olympics.

== Biography ==
Grzegorz Józef Stellak was born in Płock on 11 March 1951.

In 1972 he was a crew member of the Polish boat which finished sixth in the eight event.

Four years later he finished sixth with the Polish boat in the 1976 coxed pair competition.

At the 1980 Games he was part of the Polish boat which won the bronze medal in the coxed fours contest. In the same Olympics he also competed with the Polish team in the 1980 eight event and finished ninth.

Stellak died on 17 November 2023, at the age of 72.
