= Malcolm McGowan =

British rower

Personal information
- Born: 24 October 1955 (age 70)

Sport
- Sport: Rowing
- Club: Leander Club
Medal record
Men's rowing
Representing Great Britain
| Silver medal – second place | 1980 Moscow | Eight |
World Rowing Championships
| Silver medal – second place | 1981 Munich | Eight |

Malcolm R. McGowan (born 24 October 1955) is a British rower who competed in the 1980 Summer Olympics and in the 1984 Summer Olympics.

He was born in London in 1955 and attended Emanuel School.

In 1980 he was a crew member of the British boat which won the silver medal in the eights event. In 1981, he won a silver medal at the World Rowing Championships in Munich. He finished fifth with the British eight in the 1984 Olympics.
