= Veselin Shterev =

Bulgarian rower

Personal information
- Nationality: Bulgarian
- Born: 17 November 1957 (age 67)

Sport
- Sport: Rowing

Veselin Shterev (Bulgarian: Веселин Щерев, born 17 November 1957) is a Bulgarian rower. He competed in the men's eight event at the 1980 Summer Olympics.
