= Ferenc Kiss (rower) =

Hungarian rower

Personal information
- Nationality: Hungarian
- Born: 4 December 1956 (age 68); Budapest, Hungary

Sport
- Sport: Rowing

Ferenc Kiss (born 4 December 1956) is a Hungarian rower. He competed in the men's eight event at the 1980 Summer Olympics.
