= Duncan McDougall (rower) =

British rower

Personal information
- Born: 14 March 1959 (age 67) Aylesbury, Great Britain
- Height: 185 cm (6 ft 1 in)
- Weight: 82 kg (181 lb)

Sport
- Sport: Rowing
- Club: Leander Club
Medal record
Men's rowing
| Silver medal – second place | 1980 Moscow | Eight |

Duncan McDougall (born 14 March 1959) is a British rower who competed in the 1980 and 1984 Summer Olympics.

He was born in Aylesbury in 1959. He is a member of the Leander Club.

In 1980 he was a crew member of the British boat which won the silver medal in the eights event. Four years later he finished fifth with the British boat in the 1984 eights competition.
