= Lara Dolecek =

American coding theorist

Lara Dolecek (Bosnian: Lara Doleček; born 1976) is an American coding theorist of Bosnia and Herzegovina origin. She is known for her work on low-density parity-check codes. She works in the UCLA Henry Samueli School of Engineering and Applied Science as a professor of electrical and computer engineering and area director for signals and systems.

== Life and career ==
She was born Lara Doleček in 1976. She is the daughter of electronics engineering professor Gordana Jovanović Doleček and mechanical engineering professor Vlatko Doleček. She attended the Second Gymnasium in Sarajevo in Bosnia and Herzegovina.

She studied in the department of electrical engineering and computer science at the University of California, Berkeley, earning a bachelor's degree, master's degree, and Ph.D. there; she also has a master's degree in statistics from Berkeley. She joined the faculty at the University of California, Los Angeles after postdoctoral research at the Massachusetts Institute of Technology. She also serves on the board of governors of the IEEE Information Theory Society.

== Book ==
With Frederic Sala, Dolecek is the coauthor of the book Channel Coding Methods for Non-Volatile Memories (Foundations and Trends in Communications and Information Theory, Now Publishing, 2016).

== Recognition ==
Dolecek was named a Distinguished Lecturer of the IEEE Information Theory Society for 2021–2022.
