= Ulrich Kons =

East German rower

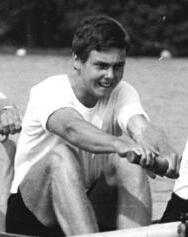
- Kons in 1982

Personal information
- Born: 3 February 1955 (age 71) Greifswald, East Germany
- Height: 1.95 m (6 ft 5 in)
- Weight: 95 kg (209 lb)

Sport
- Sport: Rowing
- Club: ASK Vorwärts Rostock
Medal record
Representing East Germany
Olympic Games
Gold medal – first place	1980 Moscow	Eight
World Rowing Championships
Gold medal – first place	1977 Amsterdam	Eight
Gold medal – first place	1982 Lucerne	Coxed four

Ulrich Kons (born 3 February 1955) is a retired German rower who had his best achievements in the eights. In this event he won a gold medal at the 1980 Olympics and a world title in 1977. He also won a world title in the coxed fours in 1982. For his Olympic achievement Kons was awarded the Patriotic Order of Merit in 1980.

Kons was Lieutenant of the East German Navy in 1972.
