= Ihar Maystrenka =

Belarusian rower

Medal record

Men's rowing

Representing Soviet Union

Olympic Games
Bronze medal – third place	1980 Moscow	Eight

Friendship Games
Gold medal – first place	1984 Moscow	Coxed pair

World Rowing Championships
Bronze medal – third place	1979 Bled	Eight
Silver medal – second place	1983 Duisburg	Coxed pair

Ihar Anatol'evich Maystrenka (Belarusian: Ігар Анатольевіч Майстрэнка, born 21 November 1959) is a Belarusian former rower who competed for the Soviet Union in the 1980 Summer Olympics.

In 1980 he was a crew member of the Soviet boat which won the bronze medal in the eights event.
