= Milan Doleček (rower, born 1957) =

Czech rower and coach

Personal information
- Nationality: Czech
- Born: 30 November 1957 (age 67); Prague, Czechoslovakia
- Relatives: Milan Doleček (son)

Sport
- Sport: Rowing

Milan Doleček (born 30 November 1957) is a Czech rower and rowing coach. Doleček competed at the 1980 and 1988 Summer Olympics. He became a rowing coach after he retired from international competitions and has trained his son, Milan Doleček, and Ondřej Synek.
