= Viktor Kokoshyn =

Ukrainian rower

Olympic medal record

Men's rowing

Representing the Soviet Union
| Bronze medal – third place | 1980 Moscow | Eight |

Viktor Oleksandrovych Kokoshyn (Ukrainian: Віктор Олександрович Кокошин, born 11 October 1957) is a Ukrainian former rower who competed for the Soviet Union in the 1980 Summer Olympics.

In 1980 he was a crew member of the Soviet boat which won the bronze medal in the eights event.
