= Uwe Dühring =

East German rower

Personal information
- Born: 23 November 1955 (age 70) Berlin, Germany
- Height: 186 cm (6 ft 1 in)
- Weight: 86 kg (190 lb)

Sport
- Sport: Rowing
Medal record
Representing East Germany
Rowing at the Summer Olympics
Gold medal – first place	1980 Moscow	8+
World Rowing Championships
Gold medal – first place	Cambridge 1978	8+

Uwe Dühring (born 23 November 1955) is a German rower, who competed for the SC Dynamo Berlin / Sportvereinigung (SV) Dynamo. He won the medals at the international rowing competitions.
