= Quietly Confident Quartet =

Australian Olympic medley relay swimming team

Personal information
- Full name: Mark Kerry (backstroke), Peter Evans (breaststroke), Mark Tonelli (butterfly) and Neil Brooks (freestyle)
- National team: Australia

Sport
- Sport: Swimming
- Strokes: Medley relay: backstroke, breaststroke, butterfly, freestyle
Medal record
Olympic Games
Gold medal – first place	1980 Moscow	4 × 100 m medley relay

The Quietly Confident Quartet was the self-given name of the Australian men's 4 × 100 metres medley relay swimming team that won the gold medal at the 1980 Summer Olympics in Moscow. The United States boycotted the Moscow Olympics in protest against the Soviet invasion of Afghanistan and, through the 2016 Olympics, the Australian victory remains the only occasion the United States has not won the event at Olympic level since its inception in 1960. The quartet consisted of backstroker Mark Kerry, breaststroker Peter Evans, butterflyer Mark Tonelli, and freestyler Neil Brooks. The team was nominally led by its oldest member Tonelli, who was 23 and was also a spokesperson for the Australian athletes' campaign for their right to compete at the Olympics against the wishes of the Fraser government. The team was seen as an unlikely prospect to win; all four of the swimmers had clashed with swimming authorities over disciplinary issues and three experienced suspension or expulsion from the Australian team during their careers.

Australia had previously won medals in the event, but was not regarded as one of the favourites for the gold, as the Soviet Union, Great Britain, and Sweden all fielded more decorated swimmers over the component legs of the relay. After the backstroke leg, Australia was in fourth place and more than a second in arrears of the Soviet leaders. However, Evans was the fastest among the breaststrokers and moved the team into second position at the halfway point in the race; and Tonelli, a makeshift butterflyer, completed his leg in a time much faster than his previous best, allowing Australia to keep the Soviet lead reasonable. Australia's anchor swimmer Brooks overtook his more credentialled Soviet counterpart Sergey Koplyakov in the latter half of the final leg to secure a narrow victory. The quartet disbanded after the Olympics due to Tonelli's retirement, although some of the members continued to be present in the relay team at various times alongside new swimmers. By 1986, all four members of the 1980 team had retired from international competition.

== Personnel ==
The Australian team for the event was a young and inexperienced foursome. Mark Tonelli was the oldest at the age of 23, followed by Mark Kerry, who turned 21 a month after the Olympics. Both were attending their second Olympics, while Peter Evans and Neil Brooks were 18 and 17 respectively and had never represented Australia at the Commonwealth, World Championship or Olympic level. Evans and Brooks were from Western Australia, a state that had never been prominent in Australian swimming. The team members had some contact prior to their Olympic selection; Brooks' family had billeted Tonelli in 1976 when the Australian Olympic team held a training camp in Perth. Brooks cited his experience with Tonelli as a motivating factor in his career.

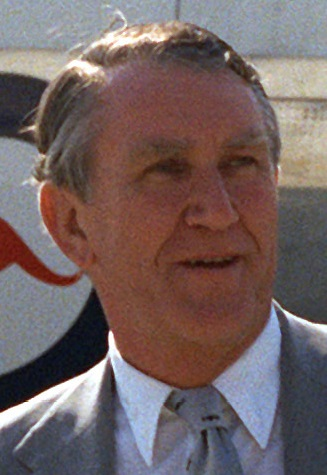
Australian Prime Minister Malcolm Fraser (pictured) pressured the Australian athletes to boycott the Olympics.

The quartet was also marked by rebellious and anti-establishment tendencies. Tonelli and Kerry were expelled from the 1978 Commonwealth Games team by the Australian Swimming Union for violating a curfew during a training camp in Hawaii before the team's trip to Edmonton, Canada for the competition; Tonelli had been out drinking and admitted to smoking marijuana, which was not illegal in Hawaii, while Kerry had been courting a female. In 1980, during the lead-up to the selection of the Olympic team, Brooks walked out of a training camp, alleging that the coaches were neglecting him, while Evans once stopped during a training session and refused to do extra mileage, emphatically proclaiming that "work is a poor substitute for talent". Later in their careers, Evans and Brooks continued to have their clashes with swimming officialdom; Evans over his coaches' demands for more training mileage and Brooks over swimmers' human rights. Brooks was later suspended twice in his career for his clashes with swimming authorities, and expelled from the Australian Institute of Sport for indiscipline.

The rebel qualities of the group were on show in the lead-up to the Olympics. An obstacle arose with the 1979 Soviet invasion of Afghanistan, which resulted in a boycott of the Games by a large part of the Western world, led by the United States. The Australian Prime Minister Malcolm Fraser was also the patron of the Australian Olympic Committee, and he and sections of the public put significant political pressure on the athletes to join the boycott. Tonelli believed that only the sportspeople would suffer from a boycott and that trade relations would continue unabated. He took a leadership role among the athletes, fighting for their right to compete and publicising their cause to the Australian community. Evans was fully supportive of Tonelli's campaign, reflecting that "We were political tools, and the only ones to suffer would be us." He rhetorically asked: "Do you really think that if we didn't go someone would come up to us after the Games and pat us on the back for not going?"

Kerry was equally adamant that he was going to compete, unlike some swimmers who decided to make personal boycotts. He received offers from Australian officials to not compete in return for financial payments. He said

I felt the biggest statement we could make was to go to Moscow and show the world. If there was a total boycott, fine, but trade was still going on. It was disgusting. Why should the athletes be made to suffer?

According to women's swimming captain Lisa Forrest, Tonelli adopted populist tactics in championing the athletes' cause. He said that Fraser was sending "wheat to feed the Russian army, wool to clothe the army and Australian metal to make Russian guns", claiming that this contradicted the proposed protest against the invasion and Russian military aggression. Tonelli's anti-authoritarian and individualistic style manifested itself during media appearances, including a news interview in which he debated with Reverend Lance Shilton, who had called the athletes traitors. Shilton expressed sympathy for the athletes, which Tonelli interpreted as condescension. He responded by rolling his eyes and twirling his finger, a gaffe that was shown on national television; Tonelli mistakenly thought that only his voice was being broadcast at the time and that the images were showing something else. Forrest said that "the damage was done—one of our most prominent anti-boycott lobbyists ... looked like a smart alec".

== Event history and expectations ==
The United States had always won the 4 × 100 m medley relay since the event's inception at the Olympics in 1960 with comfortable margins. The closest winning buffer was 2.6 seconds and in 1972 and 1976 they had won by 4.10 and 3.72 s respectively; their boycott opened up the field in the event. In the five previous times the event had been contested, Australia's best result had come in the inaugural race in Rome, where the team of David Theile, Terry Gathercole, Neville Hayes, and Geoff Shipton out-touched Japan to claim silver. The only other time that Australia had won a medal was in Tokyo in 1964, when Peter Reynolds, Ian O'Brien, Kevin Berry, and David Dickson finished behind the United States and Germany. The following two Games saw a fourth placing and an elimination in the heats. The previous outing in 1976 in Montreal had seen Australia come sixth. Kerry was the only veteran of the 1976 relay team who returned to the Olympics in Moscow.

Australia was regarded by swimming analysts as a medal chance, but were not seen as the main threats—Sweden, Great Britain, and the Soviet Union were the most heavily fancied teams. The hosts had the silver medallists in the 100 m backstroke and breaststroke, Viktor Kuznetsov and Arsens Miskarovs respectively, and their butterflyer Yevgeny Seredin had come fifth in his 100 m event. Their freestyler Sergey Koplyakov later came fourth in the corresponding 100 m event. The British boasted Duncan Goodhew, the 100 m breaststroke gold medallist, and Gary Abraham, who had placed fifth in the 100 m backstroke. Sweden's butterflyer Pär Arvidsson and backstroker Bengt Baron had won their respective 100 m events and their freestyle swimmer Per Holmertz would win silver in the 100 m a few days later. Their weakest swimmer was the breaststroker Peter Berggren, who came ninth in the 100 m. On paper, Australia's team paled in comparison. Brooks later came seventh in his 100 m freestyle semifinal and 14th overall after having an asthma attack, and Evans was Australia's only medallist in the corresponding individual event, winning bronze in the breaststroke. Kerry had been eliminated in the 100 m backstroke semifinals, while Tonelli was the Australian champion in the 100 m freestyle and backstroke but was swimming as a makeshift butterflyer; the nation did not have an entrant in the 100 m butterfly. Adding to the pressure was Australia's failure to win any gold medals in any sport at the 1976 Olympics. This meant that the public were still awaiting their first gold since the 1972 Summer Olympics in Munich. Coming into the Olympics, Australia was ranked seventh out of the thirteen competing countries.

== Race ==
The "Quietly Confident Quartet" pictured after the team's win at the 1980 Moscow Olympics: from left, Peter Evans, Neil Brooks, Mark Tonelli, and Mark Kerry.

The medley relay was scheduled for Thursday, 24 July, the fifth day of swimming competition, with heats in the morning and the final in the evening. Australia's prospects improved when Sweden was disqualified in the first heat. Australia and the Soviet Union swam in the second heat. With their superior depth, the home team was able to rest their entire first-choice quartet in the heats. On the other hand, Australia was only willing to rest Kerry—Glenn Patching swam the backstroke leg in his place. The hosts led the Australians from the start and extended their margin over each of the first three legs. Brooks reclaimed 1.34 s on the freestyle leg, but the Australians fell 0.13 s short to come second in their heat. Nevertheless, the Australians still qualified in second place overall, as they and the Soviets were more than 1.5 s faster than the third-placed Hungarians. In any case, despite resting all of their first-choice quartet, the home team were still faster than the Australians, who had fielded all but one of their full-strength team.

Evans brashly took the opportunity to attempt to regain the psychological ascendancy from Goodhew, confronting him privately and stating that "we will win it", later reporting that the Briton was astounded by his posturing. The eldest swimmer in the quartet at the age of 23, Tonelli convened the team as its de facto leader. He asked his compatriots to commit to swimming their legs in a certain time; Kerry vowed to swim the backstroke in 57 s, Evans the breaststroke in 63 s flat, Tonelli the butterfly in 54 s and Brooks promised to anchor the team in 49.8 s, even though he had never gone faster than 51 s. Tonelli named the foursome the "Quietly Confident Quartet" because they exhibited a reserved self-belief as they lined up for the race. Whereas most of the other teams were "psyching up" in the marshalling area, the Australians were remaining light-hearted and placid, confident that they could perform in the water.

Patching was one of several backstrokers who had slipped on the starting area earlier in the meet, so Kerry decided to rub a sticky red substance onto the soles of his feet. The Soviet organisers had provided a carpet following the incidents, resulting in Kerry leaving red footprints in the stadium. Kerry led off in a time faster than his effort in the individual event, but it was still two seconds slower than his personal best. He finished his leg in 57.87 s, leaving Australia in fourth place. Kuznetsov gave the Soviets the lead after posting a time of 56.81 s, with Hungary and Great Britain in second and third place. France was the last to reach the 100 m mark, recording a time of 58.84 s. Evans then swam a personal best of 63.01 s, the fastest split among the breaststrokers by 0.63 s. His leg moved Australia into second place at the halfway mark, just 0.45 s behind the hosts and roughly half a second ahead of the British and the Hungarians. The four leading teams had broken away, leaving a two-second gap back to the fifth-placed East Germans.

Tonelli then swam his leg in 54.94 s, almost two seconds faster than his previous best over the distance. He began to lose ground in the last 50 m and was a bodylength behind Seredin until a late surge brought him to within a metre by the time the swimmers touched the wall. If Tonelli had replicated his relay leg in the individual event, he would have claimed the silver medal. Although he lost 0.36 s to Seredin, he had minimised his loss and Australia were within 0.81 s going into the final leg. Furthermore, the Australians were now more than a second clear of the third-placed Great Britain.

Brooks then executed a powerful, well-timed dive and surfaced almost even with his Soviet counterpart Koplyakov. He had drawn level halfway through his leg and made a superior turn to take the lead as they headed home. The Soviet freestyler pulled level with 25 m to go before Brooks again pulled away to seal an Australian victory by 0.22 s. He did not breathe in the last ten metres, and claimed to be laughing for the final five metres, confident that his opponent could not pass him. Brooks had finished his leg in 49.86 s as he had vowed to his teammates. In doing so, he recorded the swiftest freestyle split in the relay, faster than that of the individual 100 m freestyle gold medallist, Jörg Woithe of East Germany.

The time of 3 m 45.70 s sealed Australia's first win in a medley relay at the Olympics, for men or women. It remains the only time that the United States has not won the men's event. The team made a celebratory dive into the water and did a poolside interview. Tonelli remarked that "I was totally stunned. After all the hassle, and my being the athletes' mouthpiece, we'd come through and done it". Forrest hailed the win as "a gold medal that should never have been".

Sportscaster Norman May's dramatic call of the race on the 2UE radio network, ending with "Gold, gold for Australia, gold!", has been widely cited as a notable moment in Australian sports broadcasting history.

== Government reaction ==
Relations between the Olympians and the Australian Government remained tense after months of political struggle regarding the boycott. A prime minister would customarily send a congratulatory message to Olympic medallists. However, the Australian Olympic chef de mission Phil Coles confirmed at the following day's press conference that the quartet had not received a message from Malcolm Fraser. Australian journalists soon bombarded Fraser's office with phone calls asking why he had not applauded the athletes. Various members of the government recommended that Fraser congratulate the swimmers, but the prime minister baulked. When questioned in a radio interview, he said "I hope that circumstances do not arise over the next few years which will cause them to have very great regrets about the fact that they've gone". Fraser relented and late in the night, his office sent a telegram. However, he would not send his message directly to the Olympic village, so the telegram was sent to the Australian Embassy in Moscow. Fraser had ordered the Australian diplomatic mission to close its doors to the Olympians, so the embassy staff had to pass the envelopes containing the message through the fence to Australian Olympic officials. Fraser's telegram said:

You know I did not and do not approve of Australia being represented at these Olympic Games. I do want to say however that your performance in the relay was a truly great sporting achievement. My personal congratulations.

Coles reported that the relay squad tore up the prime minister's message.

== Aftermath ==
The quartet never competed as a unit after the Moscow Olympics. Tonelli retired immediately after the Games, while Kerry took an extended break. The backstroker attempted a comeback in the leadup to the 1982 Commonwealth Games in Brisbane, but his abbreviated preparation before the selection trials was not enough and he was defeated by other swimmers. This left Evans and Brooks as the only members of the 1980 team to participate in Australia's medley relay victory at the Commonwealth Games. In 1984, Kerry secured a recall to the team as Australia's preferred backstroker, while Brooks was surpassed by Mark Stockwell as the leading freestyler. Australia came third in the 1984 Summer Olympics in the medley relay as the Americans returned to the Olympic fold; Evans and Kerry swam in the final, while Brooks did the freestyle leg in the heats. Evans and Kerry retired after the Olympics, and Brooks was not the first-choice swimmer in 1986, meaning that a totally different quartet competed in the medley relay at the 1986 Commonwealth Games in Edinburgh. Brooks was suspended for drunken behaviour on the flight back to Australia, and then retired, and all four members of the Quietly Confident Quartet had departed the Australian swimming scene. In the leadup to the 2008 Olympics Games in Beijing in discussion about calls for boycotts, Fraser stated his regret in the approach taken with trying to do a boycott of the 1980 games.
