= Swimming at the 1984 Summer Olympics – Men's 4 × 100 metre medley relay =

Men's 4 × 100 metre medley relay at the Games of the XXIII Olympiad
- Venue: McDonald's Olympic Swim Stadium
- Date: 4 August 1984 (heats & final)
- Competitors: 94 from 21 nations
- Teams: 21
- Winning time: 3:39.30 WR

Medalists
1st place, gold medalist(s)		Rick Carey, Steve Lundquist, Pablo Morales, Rowdy Gaines, Dave Wilson*, Richard Schroeder*, Mike Heath*, Tom Jager*	United States
2nd place, silver medalist(s)		Mike West, Victor Davis, Tom Ponting, Sandy Goss	Canada
3rd place, bronze medalist(s)		Mark Kerry, Peter Evans, Glenn Buchanan, Mark Stockwell, Jon Sieben*, Neil Brooks*; *Indicates the swimmer only competed in the preliminary heats.	Australia

The final of the men's 4 × 100 metre medley relay event at the 1984 Summer Olympics was held in Los Angeles, California, on August 4, 1984. 24 teams participated in the heats, with the fastest eight qualifying for the final.

== Records ==
Prior to this competition, the existing world and Olympic records were as follows.

World record	United States (USA); Rick Carey (55.60); Steve Lundquist (1:02.01); Matt Gribble (53.47); Rowdy Gaines (49.34)	3:40.42	Caracas, Venezuela	22 August 1983
Olympic record	United States; John Naber (55.89); John Hencken (1:02.50); Matt Vogel (54.26); Jim Montgomery (49.57)	3:42.22	Montreal, Canada	22 July 1976

The following new world and Olympic records were set during this competition.

Date	Event	Name	Nationality	Time	Record
4 August	Final	Rick Carey (55.41); Steve Lundquist (1:01.86); Pablo Morales (52.87); Rowdy Gaines (49.16)	United States	3:39.30	WR

== Results ==
=== Heats ===
Rule: The eight fastest teams advance to the final (Q).

Rank	Heat	Lane	Nation	Swimmers	Time	Notes
1	3	5	Australia	Mark Kerry (57.41); Peter Evans (1:02.67); Jon Sieben (54.24); Neil Brooks (49.61)	3:43.93	Q
2	3	4	United States	Dave Wilson (57.06); Richard Schroeder (1:02.66); Mike Heath (54.60); Tom Jager (50.01)	3:44.33	Q
3	1	4	Canada	Mike West (58.11); Victor Davis (1:02.54); Tom Ponting (54.22); Sandy Goss (51.25)	3:46.12	Q
4	3	3	Switzerland	Patrick Ferland (58.68); Étienne Dagon (1:03.87); Théophile David (55.24); Dano Halsall (50.34)	3:48.13	Q
5	2	4	West Germany	Stefan Peter (58.43); Gerald Mörken (1:05.49); Andreas Behrend (55.23); Alexander Schowtka (50.60)	3:49.75	Q
6	3	8	Sweden	Michael Söderlund (58.79); Peter Berggren (1:05.22); Bengt Baron (54.98); Per Johansson (50.77)	3:49.76	Q
7	2	5	Great Britain	Neil Harper (59.12); Adrian Moorhouse (1:04.95); Andy Jameson (54.66); David Lowe (51.13)	3:49.86	Q
8	3	6	Japan	Daichi Suzuki (58.31); Shigehiro Takahashi (1:04.05); Taihei Saka (55.66); Hiroshi Sakamoto (52.12)	3:50.14	Q, NR
9	1	1	New Zealand	Paul Kingsman (58.73); Brett Austin (1:04.83); Anthony Mosse (54.93); Gary Hurring (52.07)	3:50.56	NR
10	1	5	France	Frédéric Delcourt (59.11); Thierry Pata (1:04.91); Xavier Savin (55.98); Stéphan Caron (50.75)	3:50.75	
11	2	6	China	Wang Hao (58.87); Jin Fu (1:04.74); Zheng Jian (56.78); Mu Lat (51.32)	3:51.71	
12	2	1	Brazil	Ricardo Prado (58.82); Luiz Carvalho (1:06.21); Marcelo Jucá (57.24); Cyro Delgado (51.22)	3:53.49	
13	1	3	Venezuela	Giovanni Frigo (59.85); Jorge Henão (1:08.54); Rafael Vidal (55.51); Alberto Mestre (51.22)	3:55.12	
14	1	6	Mexico	Ernesto Vela (1:01.08); Eduardo Morillo (1:06.02); Carlos Romo (57.13); Ramiro Estrada (51.88)	3:56.11	
15	3	2	Egypt	Sharif Nour (59.09); Ayman Nadim (1:09.53); Ahmed Said (57.73); Mohamed Youssef (52.96)	3:59.31	
16	2	2	Singapore	David Lim Fong Jock (1:00.59); Oon Jin Teik (1:08.25); Ang Peng Siong (57.83); Oon Jin Gee (53.40)	4:00.07	
17	3	1	Jamaica	Allan Marsh (1:00.53); Andrew Phillips (1:09.63); Deryck Marks (1:00.35); Gordon Scarlett (54.84)	4:05.35	
18	2	7	Virgin Islands	Erik Rosskopf (1:03.71); Harrell Woolard (1:13.50); Scott Newkirk (1:02.70); Collier Woolard (56.27)	4:16.18	
19	1	7	Guatemala	Ernesto José Degenhart (1:05.10); Fernando Marroquin (1:09.91); Roberto Granados (1:03.35); Rodrigo Leal (58.58)	4:16.94	
20	1	8	Honduras	Salvador Covelo (1:08.53); David Palma (1:12.56); Juan José Piño (1:02.62); Rodolfo Torres (59.01)	4:22.72	
	2	3	Italy	Paolo Falchini (58.93); Gianni Minervini (1:03.78); Fabrizio Rampazzo (55.80); Marcello Guarducci	DSQ	
	1	2	Turkey		DNS	
	2	8	Lebanon		DNS	
	3	7	Hong Kong		DNS	

=== Final ===
Rank	Lane	Nation	Swimmers	Time	Notes
1st place, gold medalist(s)	5	United States	Rick Carey (55.41); Steve Lundquist (1:01.86); Pablo Morales (52.87); Rowdy Gaines (49.16)	3:39.30	WR
2nd place, silver medalist(s)	3	Canada	Mike West (56.61); Victor Davis (1:02.33); Tom Ponting (54.01); Sandy Goss (50.28)	3:43.23	NR
3rd place, bronze medalist(s)	4	Australia	Mark Kerry (57.12); Peter Evans (1:02.29); Glenn Buchanan (54.68); Mark Stockwell (49.16)	3:43.25	OC
4	2	West Germany	Stefan Peter (58.21); Gerald Mörken (1:03.55); Michael Gross (52.81); Dirk Korthals (49.69)	3:44.26	NR
5	7	Sweden	Bengt Baron (57.16); Peter Berggren (1:05.00); Thomas Lejdström (54.98); Per Johansson (49.99)	3:47.13	
6	1	Great Britain	Neil Harper (58.37); Adrian Moorhouse (1:03.61); Andy Jameson (54.10); Richard Burrell (51.31)	3:47.39	NR
7	6	Switzerland	Patrick Ferland (58.64); Étienne Dagon (1:03.70); Théophile David (55.34); Dano Halsall (50.25)	3:47.93	NR
	8	Japan	Daichi Suzuki (57.70) NR; Shigehiro Takahashi (1:03.70); Taihei Saka (55.35); Hiroshi Sakamoto	DSQ	
