= Martin Smith (swimmer) =

English swimmer (born 1960

Personal information
- Full name: Trevor Martin Smith
- National team: Great Britain
- Born: 10 January 1960 (age 66) Hitchen, Hertfordshire UK
- Height: 1.82 m (6 ft 0 in)
- Weight: 200 LBS

Sport
- Sport: Swimming
- Strokes: Freestyle
- College team: University of Arkansas
Medal record
Men's swimming
Representing Great Britain
Olympic Games
Bronze medal – third place	1980 Moscow	4×100 m medley
World Championships (LC)
Bronze medal – third place	1978 Berlin	4×100 m medley
European Championships (LC)
Bronze medal – third place	1977 Jönköping	4×100 m medley
Representing England
Commonwealth Games
Silver medal – second place	1978 Edmonton	4×100 m medley
Bronze medal – third place	1978 Edmonton	4×100 m freestyle
Bronze medal – third place	1978 Edmonton	4×200 m freestyle

Trevor Martin Smith (born 10 January 1960) is a former English competitive swimmer who represented Great Britain in two Olympic Games (Montreal 1976 & Moscow 1980), FINA world championships (1978) and European championships (1977), and swam for England in the 1978 Commonwealth Games. Smith was an Olympic bronze medallist and won six medals in major international swimming championships as a member of British or English teams. He also played American football - Place Kicker while a student-athlete at the University of Arkansas.

== Swimming ==
Smith represented Great Britain at the 1976 and 1980 Olympic Games. He was part of the bronze medal winning team in the men's 4×100-metre medley relay alongside teammates Gary Abraham, Duncan Goodhew and David Lowe. Smith also represented Great Britain winning a bronze medal at the 1978 World championships (Berlin) and a bronze medal at the 1977 European Championships in Sweden. He represented England and won a silver medal in the 4×100 metres medley relay and two bronze medals in the freestyle relays, at the 1978 Commonwealth Games in Edmonton, Alberta, Canada. He is also a two times winner of the ASA National Championship 100 metres freestyle (1977 and 1980). In addition, Smith was a water polo player, representing Great Britain at the senior and Under 18 level.

Smith joined the swimming team at the University of Arkansas where he became a 3 time All American, and later becoming their head coach until the team was discontinued in 1996. That same year, he was inducted into the Arkansas Swimming Hall of Fame. In 2019, Smith was inducted into the University of Arkansas Sports Hall of Honor for his achievements as a Razorback swimmer, football player and coach.

== American football ==
After his collegiate swimming eligibility was exhausted, Smith walked on to the Arkansas Razorbacks football team at the University of Arkansas. A barefoot placekicker, he was successful on 22 of 22 point after touchdown attempts and 5 of 7 field goals in the 1982 campaign, his only season. He was locked in a kicking competition at the beginning of the season, finally satisfying head coach Lou Holtz. Smith played in the 1982 Bluebonnet Bowl, where he kicked four extra points in Arkansas' 28-to-24 victory over the Florida Gators.

== Family ==
Smith is from a sporting family. His brother Neil Smith was an international water polo player representing England and Great Britain on the Under 21 years teams, represented Great Britain at the World Life Saving Championships in Berlin in 1978, and British Police and England in the 1974 European Wrestling championships where he won a bronze medal. His sisters Lynne and Jacky were both competitive swimmers at the club level.

== See also ==
- List of Commonwealth Games medallists in swimming (men)
- List of Olympic medalists in swimming (men)
