= Neil Brooks =

Australian swimmer

Personal information
- Nickname: "Brooksie"
- National team: Australia
- Born: 27 July 1962 (age 64) Crewe, England
- Height: 1.98 m (6 ft 6 in)
- Weight: 96 kg (212 lb)

Sport
- Sport: Swimming
- Strokes: Freestyle
- College team: University of Arkansas
Medal record
Men's swimming
Representing Australia
Olympic Games
Gold medal – first place	1980 Moscow	4x100 m medley
Silver medal – second place	1984 Los Angeles	4x100 m freestyle
Bronze medal – third place	1984 Los Angeles	4x100 m medley
Commonwealth Games
Gold medal – first place	1982 Brisbane	100 m freestyle
Gold medal – first place	1982 Brisbane	4×100 m freestyle
Gold medal – first place	1982 Brisbane	4×100 m medley
Gold medal – first place	1986 Edinburgh	4×100 m freestyle
Silver medal – second place	1986 Edinburgh	100 m freestyle

Neil Brooks (born 27 July 1962) is an Australian former sprint freestyle swimmer best known for winning the 4 × 100 m medley relay at the 1980 Olympics in Moscow as part of the Quietly Confident Quartet. Brooks was as much known for his swimming achievements as he was for disciplinary incidents, and he often found himself in conflict with officialdom and threatened with sanctions.

Born in England, Brooks emigrated to Australia as a toddler and started swimming lessons after nearly drowning in a childhood accident. After initially being known for his lack of technique, Brooks quickly rose through the youth ranks. Brooks made his debut at the Australian Championships in 1976, but it was not until 1979 that he medalled at national level and made his debut for Australia at a FINA (Fédération Internationale de Natation) Swimming World Cup meet. In 1980, he gained prominence by breaking the Australian record in the 100 m freestyle and being invited to a national team camp. There he had his first clash with officialdom, walking out after accusing the officials of neglecting him. He then qualified for the Australian team for the 1980 Moscow Olympics, defying political pressure to boycott the Games in the wake of the Soviet invasion of Afghanistan. Arriving in Moscow, Brooks' experience in the 100 m freestyle was an unpleasant one, suffering an asthma attack and missing the final. The peak of his swimming career came in the 4 × 100 m medley relay, when he caught and passed the Soviet Union's Sergey Kopliakov during the anchor leg to seal a narrow victory for Australia. This victory was the first time that the United States did not win the event at Olympic level, and the last until China's victory in 2024.

Following the Olympics, Brooks was expelled from the Australian Institute of Sport by Don Talbot for disciplinary reasons. He accepted a swimming scholarship at the University of Arkansas, where he enjoyed the more liberal disciplinary standards. He returned to Australia for the 1982 Commonwealth Games in Brisbane and again raised the ire of officials during a preparatory training camp. After lobbying for improved accommodation conditions, Brooks was involved in a physical altercation with the team manager. As a result, he was given a suspension that was to take effect after the Commonwealth Games. However, his teammates protested and threatened to walk out, resulting in the ban being rescinded. Despite the turbulent preparation, Brooks had a successful meet, winning the 100 m freestyle and anchoring the 4 × 100 m freestyle and medley relays to gold medals. Brooks competed at his second Olympics in Los Angeles in 1984 Games, where he won silver in the 4 × 100 m freestyle relay and bronze for swimming the heats of the medley relay.

Brooks' international career ended at the 1986 Commonwealth Games in Edinburgh with silver in the 100 m freestyle and gold in the freestyle relay, after which he was suspended for drinking 46 cans of beer on the return flight to Australia. In retirement, he became a news presenter and sports commentator, but was sacked in 1999 after a string of incidents amidst an alcohol addiction. Later in life he faced a number of legal issues.

== Early years ==
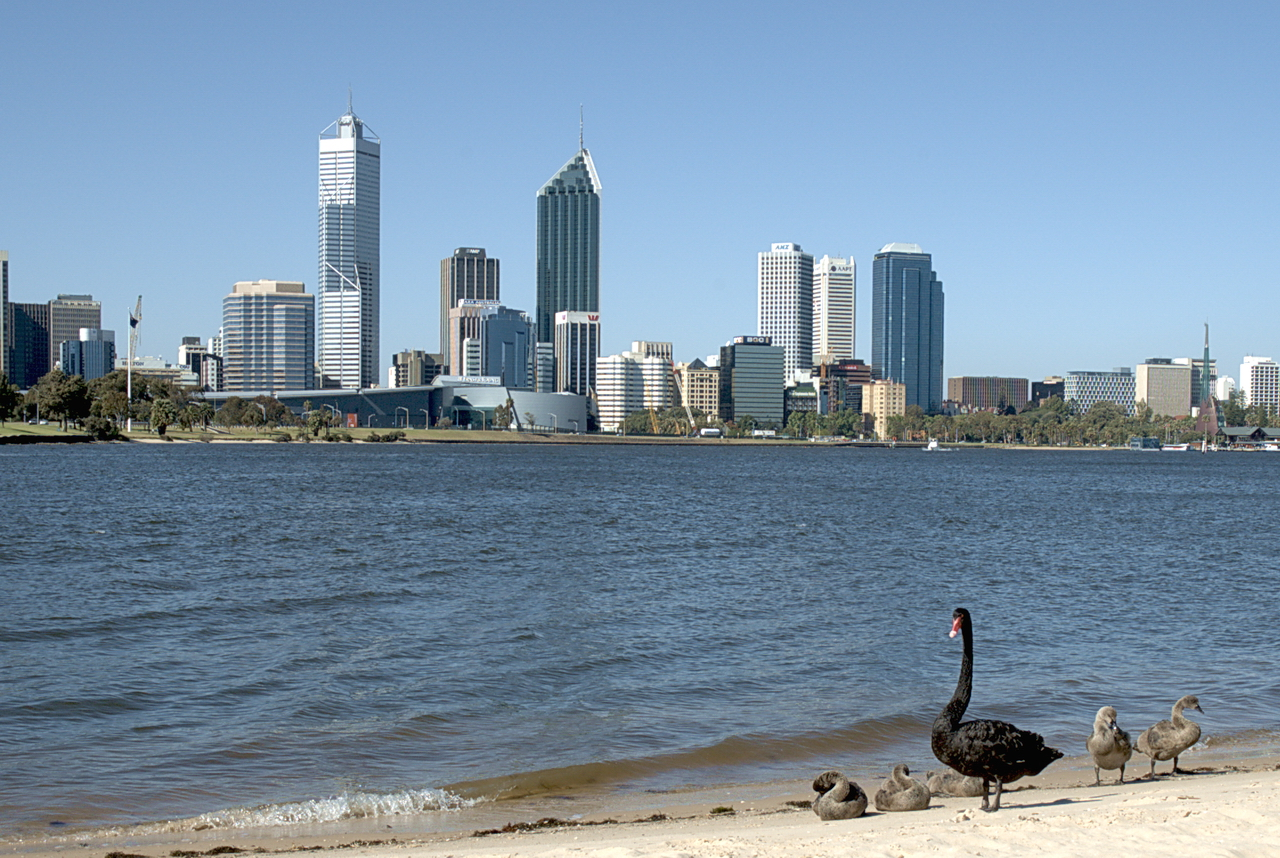
The Swan River, the site of Brooks's near-drowning. This childhood incident prompted his parents to enrol him in swimming lessons.

An only child, Brooks was born in Crewe, England, before migrating to Western Australia when he was four, along with his working-class parents Mick and Norah. His first aquatic adventure was almost his last. Aged seven, he was playing with a friend on the shore of the Swan River when they climbed into a boat that drifted deeper into water and overturned. Brooks was forced to cling to the boat as his friend swam ashore to seek help. His parents immediately enrolled him in swimming lessons at the Marylands Swim Club. Shortly after, he switched to the tutelage of Kevin Duff, who coached him for the next fifteen years. After just six weeks under Duff, Brooks came third in the 50 m breaststroke at the State Age Championships. Despite coaching the likes of Olympic medallists Kevin O'Halloran, Lyn McClements, David Dickson and Lynne Watson, Duff was virtually unknown outside Western Australia. Brooks was known for his rebellious nature, and had a glowing assessment of his coach, opining that "He's not pushy like many other Australian coaches and he's not in the politics of Australian swimming".

At the age of 13, Brooks suffered a loss of confidence. After being champion in all four strokes for the previous four years, he was now frequently losing. The other children had grown more at the start of their adolescence and he was struggling to match them. Within a year, Brooks' physical growth began to catch up and he started to regain the dominant position. He also switched from distance to sprint events.

Brooks attended Hale Primary School and trained at Beatty Park Pool, routinely dominating the State Age Championships. He won bronze in the 100 m and 200 m backstroke, and silver in the 200 m freestyle at the 1974 Australian Age Championships. Owing to a lack of style, he was known during his primary school years as "Basher Brooks", but by the time he entered Churchlands Senior High School, his stroke had become more technically refined. Nevertheless, he was always confident in his mental ability, stating "before I just swam on guts, now I had the stroke as well as the guts. I was always the toughest kid in the race."

== Swimming career ==
=== National debut ===
In 1976, at the age of 13, Brooks competed at his first open Australian Championships, but did not gain any podium finishes and as such missed selection in the team for the 1976 Summer Olympics in Montreal. In the same year, the Australian team came to Perth for its pre-Olympic training camp and were billeted in the homes of members of the local swimming community. Brooks' family took his future relay team-mate Mark Tonelli, who had a reputation for indiscipline. Brooks, however, was inspired by Tonelli and cited him as a key motivating factor in him wanting to become an Olympian.

During the 1976–77 season, Brooks came to prominence as a possible Australian representative sprinter. He broke six records in winning two events at the 1977 Western Australian Championships. He swam the 100 m freestyle in 56.56 s, breaking the state records for 14-, 15-, and 16-year-olds, before repeating the achievement in the 200 m backstroke. Still aged 14, he competed at his second Australian Championships and came fourth in the 100 m freestyle. In 1978, he came third in the 100 m freestyle and missed selection for the 1978 Commonwealth Games in Edmonton, Canada by 0.03 s. He spent the rest of the year training and studying accounting at Leederville Technical College. During the year, Brooks set Australian age group records in the 200 m individual medley, the 200 m backstroke and the 100 m freestyle. At the inaugural Australian Short Course Championships in Launceston, Tasmania in 1979, he won silver in the 200 m individual medley and bronze in the 100 m freestyle. His performances earned him selection in the Australian team for the first time, competing in the FINA Swimming World Cup event in Tokyo in April 1979, aged 16 years and nine months.

Aged 17, Brooks swam 51.91 s in Perth in January 1980, breaking Tonelli's Australian record in the 100 m freestyle. As a result, he was invited to his first national training camp under Bill Sweetenham for prospective Olympic swimmers. He had the first of his many clashes with sporting administrators, first claiming that the officials did not want him to board with Tonelli's family and then stating that Sweetenham had only coached him two or three times, which he felt was insufficient. Brooks walked out of the camp and returned to Perth to train under Duff. At the Australian Championships, the 100 m was seen as a clash between Tonelli and Brooks. The latter came second in the 100 m freestyle, outsprinted in the dying stages by Tonelli, who reclaimed his national record in a time of 51.80 s. As a result, Brooks was selected in both the individual event and the 4 × 100 m medley relay.

However, another obstacle arose with the Soviet invasion of Afghanistan, which resulted in a boycott of the Games by a large part of the Western World, led by the United States. The Australian Prime Minister Malcolm Fraser was also the patron of the Australian Olympic Committee, and significant political pressure came to bear on the athletes to boycott the Games. Tonelli, however, realised that only the sportspeople would suffer from a boycott and that trade relations would continue unabated. He took a leadership role among the athletes to fight for their right to compete.

=== Moscow Olympics ===
The 4 × 100 m medley relay was the focal point of Brooks' Moscow campaign and it came only two days before his 18th birthday. The event had always been won by the United States since its inception at Olympic level in 1960, and their boycott had opened up the field in the event. In the five times the event had been contested, Australia's best result was a silver in the inaugural race. A bronze in 1964 was the only other medal success and the 1976 edition of the medley relay had seen Australia eliminated in the heats. This time, Australia were regarded as a medal chance, but were not seen as the main threats; Sweden, Great Britain and the Soviet Union were the most heavily fancied teams. The hosts boasted the silver medallists in the 100 m backstroke and breaststroke, and their butterflyer had come fifth; their freestyler would place fourth a few days later. The British had Duncan Goodhew, the breaststroke gold medallist, while Sweden's butterflyer and backstroker had won their respective events and their freestyle swimmer would come second in the 100 m. On paper, Australia's team paled in comparison. Peter Evans was the only individual medallist over a 100 m race, claiming bronze in the breaststroke. Mark Kerry had been eliminated in the backstroke semifinals, while Tonelli was swimming as a makeshift butterflyer, despite having performed better than Kerry in the 100 m backstroke. Adding to the pressure was that Australia won no gold medals at the 1976 Olympics in any sport, and were yet to win in Moscow, so the public were still awaiting their first victory since Munich in 1972. Coming into the Olympics, Australia were ranked seventh out of the thirteen competing countries. Australia's prospects improved after the morning heats in which Sweden was disqualified. Tonelli, the eldest swimmer in the quartet at the age of 23, convened the team as its de facto leader. He asked his team-mates to commit to swimming their legs in a certain time; Kerry vowed to swim the backstroke in 57 s, Evans the breaststroke in 63 s flat, Tonelli the butterfly in 54 s and Brooks promised to anchor the team in 49.8 s, even though he had never gone faster than 51 s. Tonelli named the foursome as the Quietly Confident Quartet, and they exhibited a quiet confidence as they lined up for the race.

Kerry led off in a faster time than he had clocked in the individual event, but it was still two seconds slower than his personal best time of 57.87 s. This left Australia in fourth place at the end of the first leg. Evans then swam a personal best of 63.01 s, leaving the team almost level with the host nation at the halfway mark. Tonelli then swam his leg in 54.94 s, almost two seconds faster than his previous best. He did so with an uneven arm technique due to the disparity in the strength of his arms. He began to lose ground in the last 50 m and was a bodylength behind until a late surge brought him to within a metre of the lead by the end of his leg. Brooks then made a powerful, well-timed dive and surfaced almost even with his Soviet counterpart. At the halfway mark, he had drawn level and made a superior turn to take the lead. The Soviet freestyler Kopliakov pulled level at the 25 m mark before Brooks again sprinted away to seal an Australian victory by 0.22 s. He did not breathe in the last ten metres, and claimed to be laughing for the final five metres, confident that his opponent could not pass him. The Australian freestyler had finished his leg in 49.86 s as he had vowed to his team mates. The time of 3 m 45.70 s sealed Australia's first ever win in a medley relay at the Olympics, for men or women. Brooks dedicated the team's win to his mother, who had died from cancer the previous Christmas. Upon returning to Australia, he was greeted as a hero, but he considered retiring due to waning desire for success after his triumph in Moscow. In 2000, Brooks and the other members of the quartet were each awarded the Australian Sports Medal for their victory in Moscow.

In the individual event, which occurred after the relay, Brooks had come equal first in his heat with eventual bronze medallist Per Johansson from Sweden in a time of 52.11 s. This made him the seventh fastest qualifier for the semi-finals, but he suffered a severe asthma attack and had to be hospitalised. He swam the semi-final regardless, despite having a heart-rate before the start of race of 120, compared to his usual 72. He finished seventh in a time of 52.70 s, which saw him place 14th, missing the final by 0.83 s.

=== US college career ===
Brooks suffered from a lack of motivation after the Olympics. He was recruited to the Australian Institute of Sport by swimming coaches Bill Sweetenham and Dennis Pursley, but his stay was brief. The inaugural director Don Talbot, a former head coach of the Australian swimming team, expelled him for indiscipline. He then won the 1981 Australian title in the 100 m freestyle without training, but his time of 52.61 s was substantially slower than his personal best. Brooks then accepted a scholarship to go to the University of Arkansas to train under Sam Freas. He enjoyed the more liberal culture in the American collegiate system, particularly the relationship between swimmers and their coaches. He enjoyed the less paternalistic treatment that the coaches accorded to their swimmers, saying that "In Australia, after a race they want to lock you in your room. In America, you can share a beer after the meet with the coach." The shortcourse pools used in the United States played into the hands of Brooks, as his strong legs gave him an advantage in pushing away from the turns, which came twice as often in comparison to longcourse (50 m) pools. He had initially planned to stay in the United States for only a year, but decided to extend his stay by a year, having enjoyed the high frequency of racing and the recognition accorded to university athletes in the United States. In both years, he won the 50 m and 100 m freestyle double in the Southwest Conference, and was fourth in the 100 m freestyle at the 1981 National Collegiate Athletic Association (NCAA) Championships. He also came second in the 100 m freestyle at the AACC Championships to Rowdy Gaines.

Despite his successes in America, the Australian Swimming Union did not offer to fund a return home for Brooks for the 1982 Australian Championships, but the University of Arkansas paid his fare as a reward for his performances in collegiate competition. Despite failing to defend his 100 m title, he qualified for the 1982 Commonwealth Games in Brisbane. The team then went into a five-week training camp in the seaside Sydney suburb of South Coogee. The team resided at a migrant hostel, which at the time was primarily occupied by Vietnamese refugees from the Vietnam War. Brooks spoke out about the quality of the accommodation, leading officials to make improvements.

=== Suspension and 1982 Commonwealth Games ===
Brooks' protests against the accommodation was overshadowed by a much-publicised physical confrontation with a team official. He telephoned his coach in the United States to make return travel arrangements for the conclusion of the Commonwealth Games. Due to the difference in time zones, he made his call after the team curfew, prompting team manager Jeff Hare to attempt to disconnect the line. After Hare threatened to expel him from the team, Brooks lost his temper and pinned the manager against the wall. The swimmer was summoned to a meeting with ASU officials the following day, where he remained unrepentant. He received a one-month ban, effective after the conclusion of the Commonwealth Games. Brooks demanded that if the ASU were to suspend him, they should do so immediately for the Commonwealth Games, rather than letting him compete and win medals before punishing him. His complaints about the training conditions had gained the attention of his team-mates, and several senior swimmers threatened to leave if he was banned. In the end, the ASU rescinded the suspension. Brooks has remained strongly critical of the attitude of swimming bureaucracy, claiming that "too many officials expect unquestioning obedience", calling for the formation of a swimmers' committee.

Arriving in Brisbane for the Commonwealth Games, Brooks and some of his fellow sprinters shaved their heads, something that received much attention from the Australian public. He won his heat of the 100 m freestyle in a Commonwealth and Commonwealth Games record of 51.09 s. He swam slower in the final, but his time of 51.14 s was enough to secure the gold medal in a close contest. Just 0.43 s separated him and the bronze and silver medallists Greg Fasala and Michael Delany, both of Australia.

Brooks then won gold as part of the winning 4 × 100 m freestyle relay, anchoring the team of Fasala, Delany and Graeme Brewer to a victory by almost three seconds, putting in a split of 50.56 s. The shaven-headed quartet was dubbed the Mean Machine. He collected another gold in the medley relay, combining with David Orbell, Evans and Jon Sieben, this time completing his freestyle anchor leg in 50.44 s. Canada had finished the race far ahead of the Australians, but were disqualified for an early changeover. After the games, Brooks completed the American college season before returning to Australia. He was named as Western Australia's Sportsman of the Year.

=== Los Angeles Olympics ===
Brooks came into the 1984 Australian Championships as the favourite, but this time he was on the receiving end of a close result. He placed third in the 100 m freestyle behind Mark Stockwell and Delany, missing individual selection by 0.05 s. The trio was separated by a total of only 0.15 s. Selected as a relay swimmer only, he went to Los Angeles hoping to win the 4 × 100 m freestyle relay, an event that the United States had always won.

During the heats, the Australian team of Brooks, Fasala, Delany and Stockwell showed their intention to deny the Americans the gold for the first time at Olympic level. Drawn alongside the Americans in the third and final heat, the Australians set a new Olympic record of 3 m 19.94 s. Brooks led off in the heat, setting a time of 50.36 s, before Stockwell made up a deficit of 0.41 s during the anchor leg to beat the hosts by 0.20 s. Australia and the United States had stamped their authority on the event, qualifying almost four seconds faster than third-placed Sweden. However, the Americans had more speed in reserve, having rested 200 m freestyle silver medalist Mike Heath and 100 m freestyle gold medallist Rowdy Gaines, whereas Australia used its full-strength team.

In the final, Australian coach Terry Buck switched the swimming order, putting Fasala as the leadoff leg, while the Americans brought in Heath and Gaines. Fasala's time of 51.00 s put the Australians second at the first change, behind the Americans, for whom Chris Cavanaugh had built a 0.17 s lead. After the first leg, the race was still close—0.90 s separated all the teams. Brooks completed his leg in 49.36 s, the fourth fastest in the race, 0.24 s faster than his American counterpart Heath, giving the Australians a slender 0.07 s lead at the halfway point. Australia and the United States had broken away from the field, which was now the best part of two seconds in arrears. However, the Australian lead was short-lived. Matt Biondi took 0.59 s from Delany and Gaines took another 0.13 s from Stockwell, as the United States won in a world record time of 3 m 19.03 s. Australia were 0.65 s behind with Sweden a further 2.99 s in arrears. Brooks remained adamant that either he or Stockwell should have led off, stating that "the gold was there for the taking".

Brooks collected a bronze in the medley relay after swimming the freestyle leg in the heats before being replaced by first-choice Stockwell in the final. Competing in the third and final heat, Australia and the United States were equal at the last change before Brooks posted the fastest freestyle leg in the heats, pulling out a 0.40 s margin over Tom Jager. Australia again qualified fastest, but the Americans again had more in reserve, having rested all of their first-choice quartet in the heats. Stockwell combined with Kerry, Evans and Glenn Buchanan to finish behind the United States and Canada in the final, missing silver by just 0.02 s. Australia improved on their qualifying time by only 0.68 s, while the Americans sped up by 5.03 s.

=== 1986 Commonwealth Games and retirement from swimming ===
In 1985, Brooks dead-heated with Stockwell in the 100 m freestyle at the Australian Championships, clocking a time of 51.12 s. He then combined with Tom Stachewicz, Paul Lee and Barry Armstrong, as Western Australia won the 4 × 100 m freestyle relay for the first time. Brooks maintained his form and despite not defending his Australian 100 m title, was selected for the 1986 Commonwealth Games in Edinburgh, where he came second to Fasala in the 100 m freestyle in a time of 51.01 s. He claimed gold in the 4 × 100 m freestyle relay along with Fasala, Stockwell and Matthew Renshaw, anchoring the quartet in setting a Commonwealth Games record.

On the return flight from the games, Brooks consumed 46 cans of beer and was banned for six months after he talked about the incident during a television interview. In his memoirs, Talbot, a non-drinker, cited Brooks and his Mean Machine teammates as being one of the biggest proponents of a hard-drinking culture that had permeated the Australian swimming scene at the time. In particular, he singled out Brooks as being a focal point of disruptive activity during his time at the Australian Institute of Sport. Talbot sees alcohol as the main reason behind the collapse of Australia's standing in the swimming world in the 1970s and the subsequent prolonged period of international uncompetitiveness in the 1980s.

Brooks retired thereafter, moving to Nambour, Queensland and starting a rock band called The Union. He played the electric guitar, and also wrote his own music and songs. He also represented Western Australia in water polo and indoor cricket and played Australian rules football at district level.

== Media career ==
Having graduated from the University of Arkansas with a degree in journalism in 1985, Brooks entered the media after his retirement from swimming. Before his graduation, he had been a cadet with the Seven Network in Perth for five years, and was again hired by Seven and read the sports segment on the weekday evening news. He served as a commentator for Seven's coverage of the 1988, 1992 and 1996 Summer Olympics. Aside from covering the swimming and water polo, he also commentated on volleyball and in 1998, he called various downhill skiing events at the Nagano Winter Olympics. Brooks also called Australian Football League matches, and for three years hosted Brooksy's Footy Show. He also hosted a Western Australian travel/holiday show called Wild West, and in the lead-up to the Sydney Olympics, co-hosted The Games with Tracey Holmes.

However, Brooks' media career began to unravel in the late-1990s. He became addicted to alcohol, leading to a series of on-screen incidents. He once read the sports news segment while inebriated, and was then involved in a drunken argument with the Nine Network's Australian rules football pundit Sam Newman. In early 1999, in an interview with a magazine that had not been authorised by Seven, Brooks was asked what event he was looking forward to most at the 2000 Summer Olympics in Sydney, and replied "The after-Olympics piss-up". Seven suspended Brooks from on-screen duties for six weeks after he made the comments, which they deemed to be "tasteless and offensive", and he was eventually sacked, denying him the opportunity to commentate on the swimming events and costing him an annual salary of A$700,000, equivalent to A$1,302,302 in 2022.

Having moved to South Australia in 2003, Brooks started Local, which he billed as the state's leading lifestyle magazine. The venture was run solely by him and his wife, and was dominated by advertising. Journalist Peter FitzSimons criticised the lack of grammar checking and copyediting, citing a quote from Kieren Perkins, which was rendered thus in the publication: "I was over the moon. Winning is something you strive to do but when I consider all the factors being married two children twenty seven years of age competing in my third Games and I broke fifteen minutes twice in two days it really was quite outstanding and whichever way you cut it Grant Hackett was just the next generation of swimmer [sic]."

== Personal life ==
Brooks stood 200 cm (79 in) and weighed 95 kg (209 lb) during his career, but in the early part of the 21st century fought a battle with obesity, after ballooning to 150 kg (330 lb). As of 2007, he had lost substantial weight and fought off his alcohol problems.

Brooks' first marriage was to Lynette Quinlivan in January 1985. Their son Luke is a member of the Australian water polo team, playing as a goalkeeper. In 2000, he married his third wife Linda. As of 2022 the Brooks reside in Bali, Indonesia.

== Legal issues ==
In late 2000, Brooks was declared bankrupt by the Federal Court of Australia in Perth after failing to repay a $15,000 debt to Bankwest. In May 2001, the police raided Brooks' Perth home and found a metre-high cannabis plant. Brooks claimed that the plant belonged to a friend, and then announced that he would be leaving the state.

Brooks later became a partner in Nitro Energy Drink Company, which was involved in motorsport sponsorship. However, the firm suffered from financial trouble and he had a falling out with his business partner. In 2009, Brooks was removed from the board and the company was put into administration, and both he and his former partner started legal proceedings.

On 13 October 2017 Linda Brooks was arrested in Perth after returning there from Bali. An extradition request to Queensland was granted, and police questioned her over an alleged fraud in 2008 relating to a sports clothing company of which she was a director. Neil Brooks was later arrested upon entering the country from Hong Kong, and both were charged with fraud. It is alleged that both made dishonest representations about the success of their business in order to persuade two investors to purchase a stake in their company. Both were later released on bail and were allowed to return overseas.

In April 2022 Brooks and his wife were ordered to return to Australia in order to face court over the fraud allegations after being earlier unable to due to the COVID-19 pandemic. In October 2022 they returned to Australia and faced a two-day committal hearing that will determine whether the case will go to trial.

== See also ==
- List of Commonwealth Games medallists in swimming (men)
- List of Olympic medalists in swimming (men)
