= Mark Tonelli =

Australian swimmer, Olympic gold medallist

Personal information
- Full name: Mark Lyndon Tonelli
- National team: Australia
- Born: 13 April 1957 (age 69) Ipswich, Queensland, Australia
- Height: 181 cm (5 ft 11 in)
- Weight: 66 kg (146 lb)

Sport
- Sport: Swimming
- Strokes: Freestyle, backstroke, butterfly
- College team: University of Alabama
Medal record
Men's swimming
Representing Australia
Olympic Games
Gold medal – first place	1980 Moscow	4×100 m medley
World Championships (Long Course)
Silver medal – second place	1975 Cali	200 m backstroke
Commonwealth Games
Gold medal – first place	1974 Christchurch	100 m backstroke
Silver medal – second place	1974 Christchurch	200 m backstroke
Silver medal – second place	1974 Christchurch	4×100 m medley

Mark Lyndon Tonelli (born 13 April 1957), whose birth name was Mark Lyndon Leembruggen, is an Australian former backstroke, butterfly, and freestyle swimmer of the 1970s and 1980s, who won a gold in the 4×100-metre medley relay at the 1980 Moscow Olympics as a makeshift butterfly swimmer in the self-named Quietly Confident Quartet. Tonelli unofficially led the relay team and was an athletes' spokesperson who fought for the right of Australian Olympians to compete in the face of a government call for a boycott to protest against the Soviet invasion of Afghanistan.

Tonelli took up swimming due to his asthma, and quickly came to prominence. Selected to represent Australia at the 1973 World Championships, he came sixth in the 200 m backstroke at the age of 16. He won his first Australian titles in 1974 in the 100 m backstroke and 200 m butterfly and went on to the 1974 Commonwealth Games in Christchurch, where he won his first major international race, the 100 m backstroke, and took silver in the 200 m backstroke. In 1975, Tonelli won his only individual medal at global level, a silver in the 200 m backstroke at the World Championships in Cali, Colombia. In 1975, Tonelli enrolled at the University of Alabama in the United States, studying and competing in the collegiate sport system. He was selected in both backstroke events for the 1976 Summer Olympics in Montreal, but struggled and missed the medals in both events. During his stay in America, Tonelli set times that would have placed him among the world's leading swimmers, but he was expelled from the 1978 Commonwealth Games team for breaches of discipline.

After finishing his American university career, Tonelli returned to Australia and gained selection for his second Olympics. Having cleared the political obstacles, Tonelli was given a heavy schedule of six events: both backstroke races, the 100 m freestyle and butterfly, and two relays. He made little impact in the individual events, only reaching one final. Australia lacked butterfly swimmers and Tonelli was versatile, so he swam the stroke in the medley relay. He performed above his previous record, posting a time fast enough to win silver in the corresponding individual event and helping Australia to an unexpected win. Upon returning to Australia, Tonelli retired with eleven individual Australian championships in three different strokes.

== Early years ==
Tonelli was born Mark Lyndon Leembruggen into a working-class family in Ipswich, Queensland. His father Lyndon was a blue-collar worker of Dutch origin and his Irish mother Muriel worked in the Queensland Department of Industrial Relations. Muriel was pregnant with twins, but miscarried one of the babies and gave birth only to Mark. The family moved to the northern outback mining town of Mount Isa, where Lyndon worked as a miner. There, Muriel left her husband and married Renato "Ray" Tonelli, an Italian immigrant labourer. Still a toddler, Tonelli and his stepfather left the town and returned to Brisbane. He adopted his stepfather's surname, but did not officially change his name until he was 18.

Tonelli was effectively an only child; his half-sister was not born until he was 14. A decade later, he discovered two half-sisters from his biological father's remarriage. His family moved around frequently due to his stepfather's work, before settling permanently in Brisbane. Tonelli's family had no history of athletic success, and had little knowledge of swimming, but his mother encouraged him to take up the sport to ease his asthma. In his first year, Tonelli came third in his age group at Western Districts Club, prompting his mother to send him at age nine to John Keating—a swimming coach who had guided several swimmers to national selection–at the Centenary Pool in the hope that he could improve to Olympic standards. Tonelli said the reality was that he could hardly swim at all. By the age of 10, Tonelli was regularly winning at school carnivals and at 11, came seventh in the 100 m freestyle in his division at the Queensland Championships, before winning the event the following year. Tonelli rates his win over Stephen Holland, the future 1500 m freestyle world champion and world record holder, in a 200 m freestyle race at a schoolboys' carnival as his favourite race. Holland was to break his first world record just a few months later.

Keating motivated Tonelli by showing him the best times recorded by American boys of the same age, as documented in Swimming World Magazine. Unaware that the Americans were swimming in 50 yd pools, roughly 10% shorter than those in Australia, Tonelli could not understand his inability to match and better their times. He said that his greatest motivation was the desire to impress his parents.

== National and international debut ==
In 1973, at the age of 15, Tonelli competed in his first Australian Age Championships in Hobart, winning the 100 m and 200 m freestyle, and the 200 m backstroke. These results allowed him to swim at the preliminary qualifying trials for the 1973 World Aquatics Championships, where he managed four fourth placings. However, the selectors held another set of trials just before the World Championships, which offered swimmers a final chance to gain selection. Tonelli said "Everyone, except me, knew it was a ploy simply to keep the team on its toes".

Upon returning to Brisbane after the first round of trials, Tonelli tore rib cartilage while participating in judo at high school. The pain of the injury restricted him to swimming backstroke for four months, and his times steadily improved during this period under the guidance of John Rigby at the Valley Pool. At the final selection event, he came second in both the 100 m and 200 m backstroke behind Olympic gold medallist Brad Cooper to earn his international debut. At the World Championships in Belgrade, Yugoslavia, he came sixth in the 200 m backstroke behind East Germany's Roland Matthes, who set a world record. Tonelli self-deprecatingly noted that "I didn't get to see him [Matthes] swim in the final, because I was in the same race five sets of speedos behind".

Tonelli won his first Australian titles in 1974, claiming both the 100 m backstroke and 200 m butterfly; it was his first race in the latter stroke at senior national level. He completed the victories in times of 59.55 s and 2 m 7.30 s respectively. Tonelli also claimed victory as part of the Queensland teams in the 4 × 200 m freestyle and the 4 × 100 m medley relays—it was the first time that Queensland had won the former race. In total, Tonelli had claimed gold medals in three different strokes at his first Australian Championships.

== Commonwealth gold ==
Tonelli was selected for the 1974 Commonwealth Games in Christchurch, New Zealand, where he had his first medal success at international level. He won gold in the 100 m backstroke, where he won his heat comfortably before setting a Games record of 59.65 s in the final. Tonelli was second behind Cooper in the 200 m backstroke, finishing in a time of 2 m 9.47 s, more than three seconds in arrears. He claimed a silver in the 4 × 100 m medley relay as Australia were thwarted by Canada despite setting a national record, and was eliminated in the heats of the 200 m butterfly.

In 1975, Tonelli won the 100 m backstroke, 200 m backstroke and 200 m butterfly events at the Australian Championships. Although he won more individual titles than in the previous year, his times were slower; he completed the distances in 59.70 s, 2 m 10.50 s and 2 m 10.00 s respectively. Tonelli was also part of the Queensland team that successfully defended their medley relay title. Tonelli was thus selected for the 1975 World Championships in Cali, Colombia. He qualified fastest for the 200 m backstroke final and had planned to pursue an aggressive strategy to attack from the start. However, he was advised to swim conservatively in the first half of the race by Australian coach Terry Gathercole so that his main rivals Matthes and John Naber would not be able to draft behind him in the early stages. The tactic backfired and Tonelli ended with the silver medal. He had swum faster in the second half of the race—something exceedingly rare in top-level swimming and an indication of strategic error—and felt that he had too much unused energy left at the end of the race. Tonelli vowed that from then on, he would always back his judgment and race strategy.

== 1976 Olympics and move to US college system ==
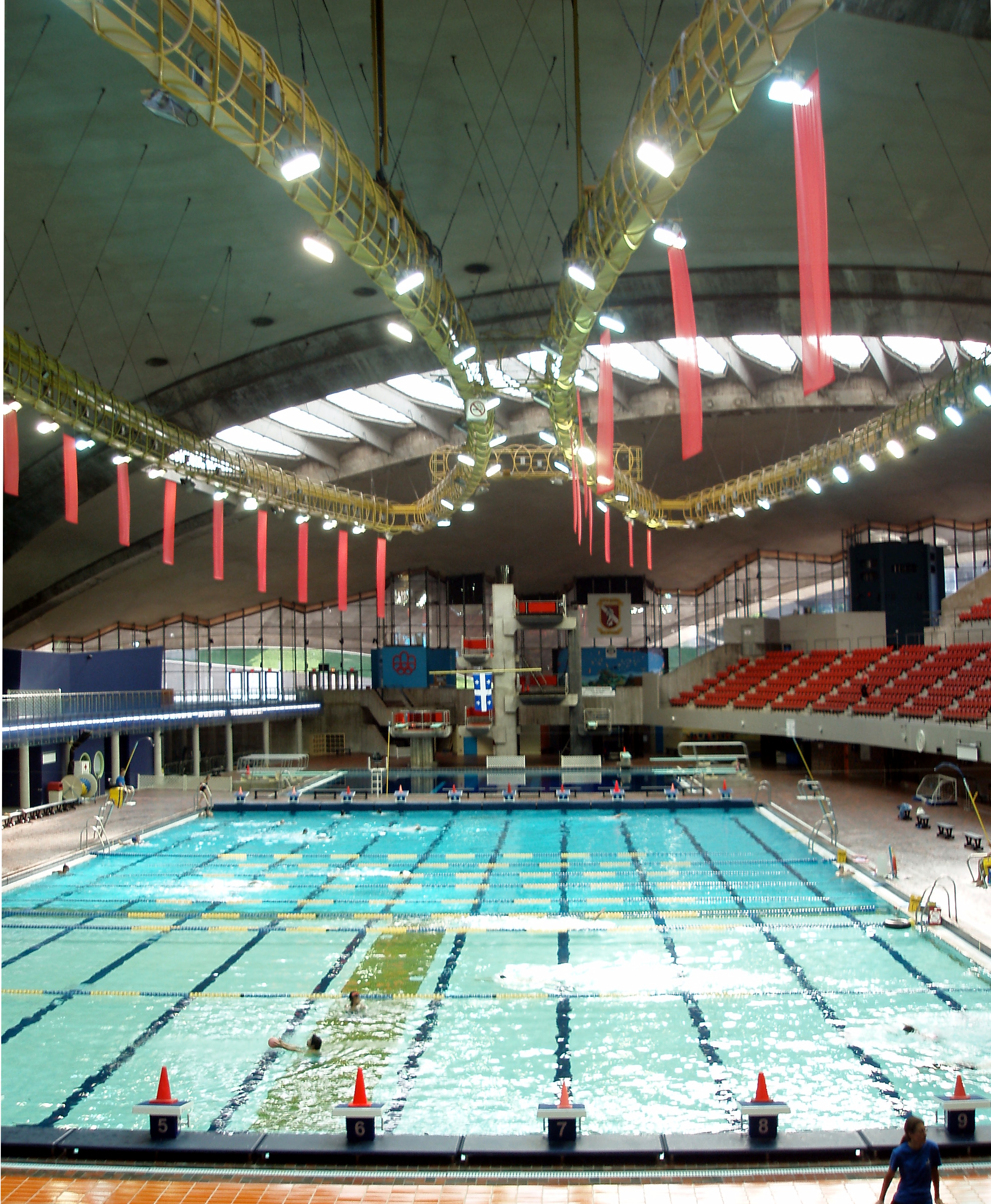
The Olympic pool in Montreal, where Tonelli competed in 1976

After the World Championships, Tonelli accepted a swimming scholarship from the University of Alabama to train under John Gambril, having rejected offers from Stanford and Harvard. Tonelli was almost killed before ever swimming for the university, suffering a mid-air parachute malfunction during an activity with the campus skydiving club. Tonelli eventually completed a BA in Communications and Film.

After enrolling at Alabama, Tonelli's parents paid for him to return home for the 1976 Australian Championships, which were the selection trials for the 1976 Summer Olympics in Montreal, Quebec, Canada. Tonelli won the 100 m backstroke in a time of 58.35 s but was relegated to silver in the 200 m event by Mark Kerry. Along with Kerry, Tonelli was selected for both backstroke events and the 4 × 200 m freestyle relay.

In Montreal, Tonelli came eighth fastest in every round of the 100 m backstroke. He came second in his heat in a time of 58.53 s, making him the eighth of sixteen qualifiers for the semifinals. He then scraped into the 100 m final as the slowest qualifier—0.01 s ahead of fellow Australian Glenn Patching—after finishing fourth in his semifinal in a time of 58.14 s. He came eighth in the final in a time of 58.42 s and did not threaten the medals; Naber of the United States won in a time of 55.49 s. As Kerry outpaced Tonelli to finish seventh in the event, he was selected ahead of Tonelli for the backstroke leg in the 4 × 100 m medley relay.

In the 200 m event, Tonelli came second in his heat to qualify sixth fastest for the final. There he came fourth and missed the medals— which were swept by the Americans—by 1.82 s. He was 3.98 s behind Naber, who broke the world record and became the first person to break two minutes for the event. Australia struggled in the 4 × 200 m freestyle relay, eliminated in the preliminary round after finishing third in their heat, and ninth overall. Tonelli swam the second leg in a time of 1 m 55.94 s.

Tonelli returned to Alabama after the Olympics and intensified his training regimen, He recalled that "The coach really supplied me with the environment to improve. I got used to pressure. You had to stand up and race in dual meets almost every other weekend, no matter how you felt. In Australia you are lucky if you get two top meets a year." In 1977, he won the 100 m backstroke at the US Open Championships at Mission Viejo, becoming one of the few Australians to win a US title.

== Expelled from Australian team ==
Tonelli continued in the United States in 1978, recollecting "I really hit my straps", reporting that he had swum world records in time trials at training. Because he was in the United States, he was allowed to qualify for the 1978 Commonwealth Games in Edmonton, Alberta, Canada by swimming fast times in events in North America. Tonelli raced in five events at the Canada Cup held in Edmonton, winning four. During a drunken party after the competition, Tonelli and some fellow swimmers decided to steal three giant flags from poles in the city centre: those of Canada, the City of Edmonton, and Alberta. In the process, Tonelli fell off the staff and was hospitalised, his arm put in plaster.

He returned to Mission Viejo and continued his build-up despite his arm injury, before flying to the Australian training camp in Hawaii, where he was made team captain. However, his international career appeared to be in disarray when along with teammates Kerry and Joe Dixon, he was expelled from the team for breaking a curfew on the American Independence Day holiday. Tonelli also admitted to the officials that he had smoked marijuana and been drinking on the night. In the aftermath of the incident, Tonelli appeared on Australian television, strongly denying rumours that he had been involved in a drug-fuelled orgy with teammates. He admitted to smoking marijuana, but defended his actions as being legal under Hawaii law. Supporters in Australia—including future Prime Minister Bob Hawke—launched a petition for the reinstatement of the trio. They gathered thousands of signatures to no avail.

Tonelli returned to the United States, while his compatriots competed for Australia. In the meantime, Tonelli again won the 100 m backstroke title at the US Nationals in a time two seconds faster than Patching's Commonwealth gold-winning effort. He said that his career was "never the same again" after his expulsion by a "kangaroo court", feeling that the punishment had weakened his will. Tonelli predicted that he could have won eight Commonwealth Games gold medals and possibly set a world record in the 200 m backstroke if he had not been expelled.

== 1980 Summer Olympics ==
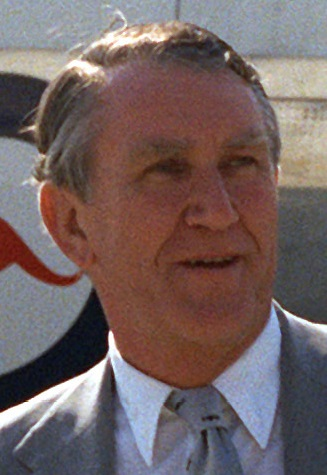
Australian Prime Minister Malcolm Fraser (pictured) pressured the Australian athletes to boycott the Olympics. Tonelli took a leadership role in fighting for the opposite.

In 1979 Tonelli failed to defend his US title in the 100 m backstroke, but managed third in the event at the National Collegiate Athletic Association (NCAA) Championships in his final year of university. In his four years at Alabama, he was an eight-time All-American in the 100 m and 200 m backstroke. His triumph at the NCAA Championships came amid the backdrop of a teammate's death in a waterskiing accident during a social event with a group of fellow swimmers. Tonelli was driving the powerboat when he did a U-turn that resulted in his teammate being thrown off his skis and into the water. The boat's propeller then struck the man, who died due to severe cuts and blood loss.

Tonelli graduated, returned to Australia, and won the 100 m freestyle, butterfly and backstroke events at the 1979 Australian Championships. The following year, he repeated the freestyle and butterfly victories in times of 51.80 s and 56.64 s to gain selection for the 1980 Summer Olympics in Moscow; he was also chosen for the 100 m and 200 m backstroke after finishing second to Kerry. However, another obstacle arose with the Soviet invasion of Afghanistan, which resulted in a boycott of the Games by a large part of the Western world, led by the United States. The Australian Prime Minister Malcolm Fraser was also the patron of the Australian Olympic Committee, and significant political pressure came to bear on the athletes to boycott the Games. Tonelli however, knew that only the sportspeople would suffer from a boycott and that trade relations would continue unabated. He took a leadership role among the Australian athletes to fight for their right to compete. According to women's captain Lisa Forrest, Tonelli adopted populist tactics in championing the athletes' cause. He said that Fraser was sending "wheat to feed the Russian army, wool to clothe the army and Australian metal to make Russian guns", saying that this contradicted the proposed boycott in protest against Soviet military policy. Tonelli's anti-authoritarian and individualistic style manifested itself during media appearances, including a news interview in which he debated with Reverend Lance Shilton, who had referred to the athletes as traitors. Shilton expressed sympathy to the athletes, which Tonelli interpreted as condescension. Unaware that the camera was broadcasting images of him, Tonelli responded by rolling his eyes and twirling his finger, a gaffe that was shown on national television. Forrest said that "the damage was done—one of our most prominent anti-boycott lobbyists ... looked like a smart alec".

Tonelli arrived in Moscow facing a heavy schedule: he was nominated in the 100 m freestyle, backstroke and butterfly, the 200 m backstroke and the 4 × 100 m medley and the 4 × 200 m freestyle relays. Tonelli came third in his heat of the 100 m freestyle to qualify fourth with a time of 52.04 s. However, he swam slower in coming fifth in his semifinal in a time of 52.17 s to miss the final by 0.26 s. Overall, he was ranked 10th, but if he repeated his Australian record of 51.80 set at the selection trials, he would have come sixth.

Tonelli had another let-down in the 100 m backstroke. He won his heat—which was relatively slow—in a time of 58.66 s, and scraped into the semifinals as the second slowest of 16 qualifiers. He then came second in his semifinal in a time of 57.89 s to qualify third fastest, before again swimming slower in the final and finishing seventh in a time of 57.98 s. However, the event was closely contested; only 0.18 s separated third and ninth places in the semifinal and there was only 0.35 s between bronze and seventh in the final.

Tonelli rued his individual performances in Moscow: "I fell apart. I had swum only one big race in the past twelve months and lacked the competitive edge." He came third in his heat of the 200 m backstroke in a time of 2 m 7.04 s, four seconds slower than his effort in the previous Olympics. This placed him in fifteenth position, more than two seconds from qualification for the final. Tonelli then withdrew from the 100 m butterfly to concentrate on the 4 × 200 m freestyle relay. He combined with Kerry, Graeme Brewer and Ron McKeon as Australia qualified fourth before coming seventh. Tonelli swam the second leg in the final after leading off in the heats. The Australians were third after the first leg, which was swum by Brewer, the bronze medallist in the corresponding individual event. However, Tonelli split 1 m 53.47 s, the fifth slowest time among the 32 swimmers, resulting in Australia falling back to seventh place by the end of his leg. Kerry and McKeon could not overtake any swimmers in the last two legs and Australia ended the race in seventh place, 1.52 s outside the medals. Tonelli was disappointed with the relay result, feeling that the Australians—who came into the race ranked second in the world in the event—were too casual before the race, incorrectly believing that four fast legs from four fast swimmers would yield the desired result.

=== Relay gold ===
The 4 × 100 m medley relay was the focal point of Tonelli's Moscow campaign. The event had always been won by the United States since its inception at the Olympics at the 1960 Games, and their boycott had opened up the field. Australia's best result had come in the inaugural race, when it out-touched Japan to claim silver. The only other time that it had won a medal was in 1964, taking bronze, and the previous outing in 1976 had seen Australia eliminated in the heats. Australia was regarded as a chance of a medal, but were not seen as the main threats, with Sweden, Great Britain and the Soviet Union the most heavily fancied teams. The hosts' team included the silver medallists in the 100 m backstroke and breaststroke, and their butterflyer had come fifth; their freestyler would come fourth in his event. The British boasted Duncan Goodhew, the breaststroke gold medallist, while Sweden's butterflyer and backstroker had won their respective events and their freestyle swimmer would come second in the 100 m. On paper, Australia's team paled in comparison. Neil Brooks, the freestyler, would come fourteenth in the corresponding individual event after having an asthma attack, while Peter Evans was the only individual medallist in the distance, claiming bronze in the 100 m breaststroke. Kerry had been eliminated in the backstroke semifinals, while Tonelli was swimming as a makeshift butterflyer. Adding to the pressure was that Australia won no gold medals at the 1976 Olympics in any sport, so the public were still awaiting their first victory since the 1972 Games in Munich. Coming into the Olympics, Australia were ranked seventh out of the thirteen competing countries.

Australia's prospects improved after Sweden was disqualified in the morning heats. Tonelli, the eldest swimmer in the quartet at the age of 23, convened the team as its de facto leader. He asked his teammates to commit to swimming their legs in a certain time; Kerry vowed to complete the backstroke in 57 s, Evans the breaststroke in 63 s flat, Tonelli the butterfly in 54 s and Brooks promised to anchor the team in 49.8 s, even though he had never gone faster than 51 s. Tonelli named the foursome the Quietly Confident Quartet, and they exhibited a calm self-belief as they lined up for the race.

Kerry led off in a faster time than he had clocked in the individual event, but it was still two seconds slower than his personal best time of 57.87 s. This left Australia in fourth place at the end of the first leg. Evans then swam a personal best of 63.01 s, leaving Australia almost level with the host nation at the halfway mark. Tonelli then swam the butterfly leg in 54.94 s, almost two seconds faster his previous best over the distance. He did so with an uneven arm technique due to the unequal strength in his arms. Tonelli's butterfly leg would have been good enough for a silver medal if he had replicated it in the individual event. He began to lose ground in the last 50 m and was a bodylength behind until a late surge brought him to within a metre of his Soviet opponent by the end of his leg. Brooks then executed a powerful, well-timed dive and surfaced almost even with his Soviet counterpart. By the 50 m mark, he had drawn level and made a superior turn to take the lead. The Soviet freestyler pulled level at the 25 m mark before Brooks sprinted away again to seal an Australian victory by 0.22 s. He had finished his leg in 49.86 s as he had vowed to his teammates. The time of 3 m 45.70 s sealed Australia's first ever win in a medley relay at the Olympics, for men or women. After the win, Tonelli said "I was totally stunned. After all the hassle, and my being the athletes' mouthpiece, we'd come through and done it." In 2000, Tonelli and the other members of the quartet were each awarded the Australian Sports Medal for their victory in Moscow.

Relations between the Olympians and the Australian Government remained tense after months of political struggle regarding the boycott. The quartet did not receive the customary congratulations from Fraser, who initially resisted complaints the next day from the media and government members at his failure to applaud the Australian victory. In a radio interview, he said "I hope that circumstances do not arise over the next few years which will cause them to have very great regrets about the fact that they've gone". Fraser relented and late in the night, his office sent a telegram indirectly, through the Australian Embassy in Moscow. Fraser had ordered the Australian diplomatic mission to shun the Olympians, so the embassy staff had to pass the envelopes containing the message through the Olympic Village fence. Fraser's telegram said: "You know I did not and do not approve of Australia being represented at these Olympic Games. I do want to say however that your performance in the relay was a truly great sporting achievement. My personal congratulations." The swimmers tore up the message.

Tonelli retired after the Games. His aquatic success was not derived from any physical advantage, as he was relatively small for a swimmer. He was only 185 cm tall and weighed 70 kg, with relatively small hands and feet. Tonelli felt that his success was based around his ability to make fast starts from the blocks, and attributed his success to his mental approach and his ability to convert his energy into a fast swim in under one minute. He had a deliberate strategy of making himself nervous before the race, feeling that he thrived on pressure.

== After the 1980 Olympics ==
After retiring from competition, Tonelli did television commentary for the 1984 and 1988 Olympics in Los Angeles and Seoul respectively. Since 2004, he has been a swimming commentator on Sky News Australia. Outside swimming, he worked at a spastic centre for children in Brisbane in the 1980s before opening his own swimming school. He also completed a series for the Australian Broadcasting Corporation on their Lifestyle TV program and produced movies on swimming and child development. Tonelli later set up his own computing business, which he ran for three years. He also served as a sports administrator, completing a term on the Australian Sports Commission in its early years in the 1980s. One policy that he proposed was the creation of an athletes' appeal tribunal similar to the Court of Arbitration for Sport so that "officials are now held accountable for their actions". He cited his expulsion from the Australian team as his motivation for having an appeals mechanism. As of 2007, Tonelli was working as a real estate agent and corporate speaker. He married his wife Lee in the late 1990s.

== See also ==
- List of Commonwealth Games medallists in swimming (men)
- List of Olympic medalists in swimming (men)
