= Norman May =

Australian sports broadcaster (1928–2016)

Norman May AM
- May in the 1990s
- Born: 14 February 1928; Melbourne, Victoria, Australia
- Died: 11 September 2016 (aged 88); Sydney, New South Wales, Australia
- Occupations: Sportscaster, sportswriter, journalist
- Years active: 1957−2000

Norman "Nugget" Alfred Vale May AM (14 February 1928 – 11 September 2016) was an Australian radio and television sports broadcaster. His most famous moment was calling "GOLD, GOLD for Australia, GOLD" during the men's 4 × 100 metres medley final in the 1980 Moscow Olympic Games.

== Early life and career ==
May was born in Melbourne on 14 February 1928. His family moved to Sydney when he was three and he was raised in Coogee, a southern suburb of Sydney. Despite losing an eye in an accident at the age of six, he was considered talented at cricket, rugby league and surfing. May got into some trouble as a youth, culminating in his arrest and week-long detention. He attended Sydney Boys' High School, where he made the school's cricket and rugby union teams, but left at the age of 14. May was given the nickname "Nugget" during his youth due to his stocky body type, a name he was known by throughout his life.

After leaving school May worked various jobs during World War II whilst continuing to play cricket, as well as being an active member of the Coogee Surf Life Saving Club. He moved to the suburb of North Curl Curl in Sydney's north with his mother in 1949, where he joined the Freshwater Surf Life Saving Club, before finally working as a clerk at an insurance company from his mid 20s.

== Broadcasting career ==
In 1957, May was invited by his friend and ABC sports broadcaster Dick Healey to join him as a commentator of a surf lifesaving event. The following year he was employed by the ABC as a trainee broadcaster, where he remained as a full-time employee until 1984.

During the men's 4 × 100 metres medley final at the 1980 Moscow Olympic Games, May's commentary for 2UE culminated in the exclamation "GOLD, GOLD for Australia, GOLD". The feat was significant it was Australia's first gold medal in eight years, after not winning any at the 1976 Montreal Olympic Games, while the government wanted the Australian team to follow America's lead in boycotting the Games. May's call of the race was notable for not hiding his support for the Australian team, as opposed to objective commentary that was the norm of the time. In the time since the event, May has become better associated with the win than the four swimmers who competed, with the swimmers themselves describing May as the fifth member of the relay team.

May commentated a total of eleven Olympic and eleven Commonwealth Games during his career. Besides the Olympics, May called a wide variety of sports including harness racing, surf life-saving, cricket and rugby.

He was known to unnerve his co-commentators by turning up just before the start of a match and say “good morning chaps, who’s playing?” His career in sports broadcasting continued following his official retirement from the ABC in 1984.

== Awards and recognition ==
May received the Medal of the Order of Australia (OAM) in the 1983 Birthday Honours "for service to the media", and an Australian Sports Medal in 2000. Also in 2000, he was awarded an Olympic Order, and in 2003 he received an Australian Sports Commission Media Awards - Lifetime Achievement Award.

May was inducted into the Sport Australia Hall of Fame in 2004 and appointed a Member of the Order of Australia (AM) in the 2009 Australia Day Honours, "for service to the community through promotional and support roles with the Australian Olympic and Commonwealth Games Team Appeals and through cultural and seniors' organisations." His 'Gold Gold Gold: 4 × 100 Metres Men’s Medley Relay' race call was added to the National Film and Sound Archive's Sounds of Australia registry in 2010.

== Legacy ==
May's contribution to Australian sports broadcasting has been held in high regard both during and after his career, with ABC broadcasters such as Jim Maxwell, Drew Morphett and Gerard Whateley considering May a mentor. He was particularly noted by Maxwell for his ability to speak without the benefit of an autocue.

== Death ==
May died in Sydney on 11 September 2016 after a short illness, aged 88.
