= Peter Evans (swimmer) =

Australian swimmer

Personal information
- Full name: Peter Maxwell Evans
- National team: Australia
- Born: 1 August 1961 (age 65) Perth, Western Australia
- Height: 1.90 m (6 ft 3 in)
- Weight: 77 kg (170 lb)

Sport
- Sport: Swimming
- Strokes: Breaststroke
- College team: University of Arizona
- Coach: Dick Jochums; University of Arizona
Medal record
Men's swimming
Representing Australia
Olympic Games
Gold medal – first place	1980 Moscow	4×100 m medley
Bronze medal – third place	1980 Moscow	100 m breast
Bronze medal – third place	1984 Los Angeles	4×100 m medley
Bronze medal – third place	1984 Los Angeles	100 m breast
Commonwealth Games
Gold medal – first place	1982 Brisbane	4×100 m medley
Bronze medal – third place	1982 Brisbane	100 m breast
Summer Universiade
Bronze medal – third place	1983 Edmonton	100 m breast

Peter Maxwell Evans (born 1 August 1961) is an Australian breaststroke swimmer of the 1980s who won four Olympic medals, including a gold in the 4×100 m medley relay at the 1980 Moscow Olympics as part of the Quietly Confident Quartet. He also won consecutive bronze medals in the 100 m breaststroke at the 1980 Olympics and the 1984 Los Angeles Olympics.

The son of prominent Western Australian businessman and politician Max Evans, Evans had a late start to his swimming career, making his debut at the Australian Championships in his hometown of Perth, aged 17. Despite placing second in the 100 m breaststroke, he was not selected for Australia, and instead travelled to the United Kingdom to train under David Haller. During this period, he quickly improved his times and rose from outside the top 200 into the top 25 in the world rankings. Evans returned to Australia in 1980 and qualified for the Olympics in both the 100 m and 200 m breaststroke. A sprinter, he won the 100 m in an Australian record time and showed a preference for shorter events, which required less training mileage. Evans gained a reputation for often doing fewer training laps than his coach asked of him. Having rebuffed Australian government pressure to boycott the Moscow Olympics in response to the Soviet invasion of Afghanistan, Evans won bronze in the 100 m breaststroke. His career peak came in the 4 × 100 m medley relay, when he outsplit his opponents in the breaststroke leg of the relay, bringing Australia into contention for its eventual win, which remains the only time that the United States has not won the event at Olympic level.

After the Olympics, Evans moved to the United States to study business and compete for the University of Arizona, under Hall of Fame Coach Dick Jochums, who was just beginning his tenure at Alabama. Evans was less successful in the short-course format used at college level, which placed more reliance on efficient turns. Evans returned to Australia for the 1982 Commonwealth Games in Brisbane, winning silver in the 100 m breaststroke and gold in the medley relay. He competed in his second Olympics in Los Angeles in 1984, winning bronze in both the 100 m breaststroke and the medley relay. Evans retired after missing selection for the 1986 Commonwealth Games and attempted to follow his father into politics. He unsuccessfully stood as the candidate for the Liberal Party of Australia in the electoral district of Perth at the 1986 state election, before pursuing a career in business.

== Early years ==
The second of four children, Evans was born into an affluent family in Perth, Western Australia. His father Max was a chartered accountant who went on to become a politician for the Liberal Party in the state's Upper House. Max was the president of the Western Australian Chamber of Commerce and Industry and a senior partner in the accounting firm founded by Sir Charles Court, then premier of Western Australia, who was credited with modernising the state and transforming its lucrative mining industry. Max was an honorary member of the Australian Chamber of Commerce. The Evans family had a sporting pedigree. Max had been a state champion athletics sprinter at youth level and won a gold, a silver and three bronze medals as part of Western Australian relay teams at the Australian Championships. Evans' mother Barbara, a physiotherapist, was a capable swimmer and won a half-blue in netball at the University of Western Australia.

Evans attended the exclusive Scotch College in Perth for his entire primary and high school years. He was initially a self-taught swimmer, having observed his father in the water. He recalled that "As I didn't like to get up early, I didn't get swim instruction until my sixth grade at Scotch College". Evans later trained and competed for the school swimming team in summer as well as the field hockey team. Evans enjoyed success in all four strokes at school level, but was most proficient at breaststroke and chose to specialise in it, commenting that "I'd rather be good at one stroke than mediocre in four". Thereafter, he was undefeated in breaststroke at school level. Evans learned the "whip kick" from Ian Dickson, brother of Olympic freestyle swimming medallist David Dickson. Evans later honed his endurance ability under Kevin Duff and his sprinting ability under Bernie Mulroy.

== National debut ==
In November 1978, Evans broke the Western Australian record for the 100 m breaststroke during his final year at school. He and his father decided that he should step up his swimming career, and Evans entered the 1979 Australian Championships in Perth. Despite only four weeks of solid training leading up to the meet, Evans came second to Lindsay Spencer. Evans was omitted from the Australian squad that toured Britain because he was an unknown swimmer. After the meet, Evans vowed to become an elite swimmer and Olympian. A week later, Evans travelled to England to train at Crystal Palace in London under David Haller, coach of future Olympic breaststroke gold medallist Duncan Goodhew. Evans did so feeling that there was insufficient coaching support for breaststrokers in Australia. In three months of training in London, Evans had risen up the breaststroke rankings from outside the top 200 into the top 25. He returned to Australia and won selection in the national team for the FINA (Fédération Internationale de Natation) World Cup in Japan, before returning to London for more training.

Evans returned to Australia in 1980 to compete at the Australian Championships, which doubled as the Olympic trials. His sojourn in the United Kingdom meant that he was a virtual unknown in his home country. He set a national record in winning the 100 m breaststroke in a time of 1 m 4.80 s and also qualified for his less preferred 200 m event. During the Olympic training camp in Brisbane, the Australian coaches tried to get Evans to cover more mileage at training. Evans' teammates recalled him stopping during a pool session and emphatically proclaiming that "Work is a poor substitute for talent". In 2000, more than a decade after his retirement, he was still using this slogan. Evans was confident in his own training methods and refused to bend to the coaches. His teammate Mark Tonelli said that Evans "knew what he was capable of and as far as he was concerned, he was capable of anything".

== 1980 Moscow Olympics ==
Having qualified to swim for Australia, another obstacle arose with the Soviet invasion of Afghanistan, which resulted in a boycott of the Games by a large part of the Western world, led by the United States. The Australian prime minister, Malcolm Fraser, was also the patron of the Australian Olympic Committee, and significant political pressure came to bear on the athletes to boycott the Games. Evans' relay teammate Tonelli believed that only the sportspeople would suffer from a boycott and that trade relations would continue unabated. He took a leadership role among the athletes to fight for their right to compete and publicise their cause among the Australian public. Evans was fully supportive of Tonelli's campaign, reflecting that "We were political tools, and the only ones to suffer would be us." He rhetorically asked: "Do you really think that if we didn't go someone would come up to us after the Games and pat us on the back for not going?"

Having arrived in Moscow, Evans' first event was the 100 m breaststroke, which the Soviets were favoured to win. Evans' former flat-mate and training partner Goodhew was another of the favourites. Evans placed equal first in his heat and advanced to the final as the fourth-fastest qualifier, along with Goodhew, two Soviets and fellow Australian Spencer. In a hard-fought final, Goodhew won the gold medal, while Evans narrowly missed out on silver, finishing 0.14 s behind the Soviet Union's Arsens Miskarovs to claim bronze in a time of 1 m 3.96 s. Evans was just 0.04 s ahead of Aleksandr Fyodorovsky, another swimmer from the host nation. Reflecting on the race, Evans felt that his lack of experience compared with Goodhew was a factor in his loss. Evans felt that Goodhew had "psyched [him] out". Evans was less successful in the 200 m—not his preferred distance. He came fourth in his heat in a time of 2 m 26.62 s, which saw him eliminated with the 12th-fastest time, some three seconds slower than what was needed to make the final.

=== Relay victory ===
The 4 × 100 m medley relay was the focal point of Evans' Moscow campaign. The event had always been won by the United States since its inception at Olympic level in 1960, and their boycott had opened up the field in the event. In the five times the event had been contested, Australia's best result was a silver in the inaugural race. A bronze in 1964 was the only other medal success, and the 1972 medley relay had seen Australia eliminated in the heats. This time, Australia was regarded as a medal chance, but were not seen as the main threats—Sweden, Great Britain and the Soviet Union were the most favoured teams to win. The hosts' team included the silver medallists in the 100 m backstroke and breaststroke, and their butterflyer had come fifth. Later, their freestyler placed fourth. The British had Goodhew, the breaststroke gold medallist, while Sweden's butterflyer and backstroker had won their respective events and their freestyle swimmer would come second in the 100 m. On paper, Australia's team paled in comparison. Neil Brooks, the freestyler, would come 14th overall after an asthma attack, and Evans was the only individual medallist in the corresponding individual event. Mark Kerry had been eliminated in the backstroke semifinals, while Tonelli was swimming as a makeshift butterflyer. Adding to the pressure was that Australia had won no gold medals at the 1976 Olympics in any sport, and were yet to win one in Moscow, so the public were still awaiting their first victory since Munich in 1972. Coming into the Olympics, Australia were ranked seventh out of the 13 competing countries.

Australia's prospects improved after the morning heats in which Sweden was disqualified. Evans took the opportunity to attempt to regain the psychological ascendancy from Goodhew, confronting him privately and stating that "we will win it". Evans felt that his posturing had shaken Goodhew. Tonelli, the eldest swimmer in the quartet at the age of 23, convened the team as its de facto leader. He asked his teammates to commit to swimming their legs in a certain time; Kerry vowed to swim the backstroke in 57 s, Evans the breaststroke in 63 s flat, Tonelli the butterfly in 54 s and Brooks promised to anchor the team in 49.8 s, even though he had never gone faster than 51 s. Tonelli named the foursome as the Quietly Confident Quartet, and they exhibited a quiet confidence as they lined up for the race.

Kerry led off in a faster time than he had clocked in the individual event, but it was still two seconds slower than his personal best time of 57.87 s, leaving Australia in fourth place at the end of the first leg. Evans then swam a personal best of 63.01 s to put Australia in second place, almost level with the host nation at the halfway mark. Evans had out-split Goodhew by 0.8 s and Miskarov by 0.5 s. Tonelli then swam his leg in 54.94 s, almost two seconds faster than he had ever done before. Tonelli began to lose ground in the last 50 m and was a bodylength behind until a late surge brought him to within a metre of the lead by the end of his leg. Brooks then performed a powerful, well-timed dive and surfaced almost even with his Soviet counterpart. He had drawn level by the halfway mark and made a superior turn to take the lead. The Soviet freestyler pulled level at the 25 m mark before Brooks again sprinted away to seal an Australian victory by 0.22 s. Brooks had finished his leg in 49.86 s as he had vowed to his teammates. The time of 3 m 45.70 s sealed Australia's first-ever win in a medley relay at the Olympics, for men or women. The team then made a celebratory dive into the pool and were interviewed at the poolside. Evans said that the relay "was unbelievable, but it was all so logical. I was so deliriously happy that I couldn't stop talking."

Upon returning to Australia, Evans and Brooks were raucously received in their hometown of Perth. They were denied a civic reception by the Lord Mayor of the City of Perth, who supported an Olympic boycott over Afghanistan, but the Lord Mayor of Fremantle instead hosted a reception. Evans received congratulations from Prime Minister Fraser. In 2000, Evans quipped that "We're the Vietnam vets of the Olympic movement". In the same year, Evans and the other members of the quartet were each awarded the Australian Sports Medal for their victory in Moscow.

== US college career ==
A few weeks before the Olympics, Evans had signed a deal with the University of Arizona, and he went there to study and swim after the Olympics. Evans was to spend five years in Arizona studying for a BA in business. He regarded his American experience as a crucial component of his development: "I got a good education, but above all I learned about myself". The American laissez faire attitude—which revolved around the individual's self-determination—sat well with Evans' outlook on life. He often clashed with Arizona swimming coach Dick Jochums, who was regarded as a hard taskmaster. The pair clashed over the training regime; Jochums insisted that Evans increase his mileage, something that the student strongly resisted. Evans was an All-American for four years, but he struggled in the short-course pools used in the college system. Short-course pools—which are only half the length—place more emphasis on a swimmer's turning ability, which was the Australian's weakness. Despite his ranking as third in the world at the Olympics, which are swum in long-course pools, Evans was ranked only fifth in the college system.

The Australian Swimming Union (ASU) did not recognise times that had been recorded in short-course pools in the United States, so Evans was forced to return for the Australian Championships to qualify for the 1982 Commonwealth Games held in Brisbane. Despite winning neither of the breaststroke events, Evans successfully earned selection and lined up at the Commonwealth Games in the 100 m and 200 m breaststroke and the 4 × 100 m medley relay. In his favoured 100 m event, Evans won bronze, having been led home by Adrian Moorhouse of England and Canada's Victor Davis. In the 200 m event, Evans came fourth, almost four seconds behind the victorious Davis. He then combined with David Orbell, Jon Sieben and Brooks to win the medley relay in a Commonwealth Games record time. Canada reached the wall far ahead of Australia, but were disqualified for a premature changeover.

== International farewell ==
After the games, Evans returned to the United States to continue his studies and collegiate swimming career. Before the 1984 Olympics, Evans travelled to Hong Kong to train with Haller, who was coaching the British colony's swimming team. Evans revitalised himself under his favourite coach and returned to his old style of sprinting. He twisted his ankle later in Perth and missed some training time. He won the Australian 100 m breaststroke championship to qualify for the 1984 Summer Olympics in Los Angeles, and returned to Arizona to continue training. His Olympic campaign was placed in jeopardy when the ASU threatened to remove Evans from the team for skipping their training camp in Australia. The threat was withdrawn after Evans' father confronted the ASU and pointed out that his son was training, although in a different location. Before the Games, Evans joined the Australians for their final training camp at Stanford University in California. Evans arrived in Los Angeles with the same program as in Moscow; he entered both breaststroke events and the medley relay. Evans started brightly to win his heat of the 100 m breaststroke in an Olympic record time of 1 m 2.87 s. His new mark did not last long—John Moffet broke it in a later heat to relegate Evans to the second-fastest qualifying time.

Nevertheless, their opponents were able to lift and the final saw Steve Lundquist of the United States set a new world record of 1 m 1.65 s; Evans took bronze, 0.98 s behind silver medallist Davis. Evans was unable to maintain the pace that he had set in the heats, clocking a time 0.10 s slower. In the 200 m, Evans came second in his heat but was not fast enough to make the final, swimming 1.47 s slower than the slowest qualifier to finish 17th. The final event for Evans was the 4 × 100 m medley relay. Evans was joined by Kerry, while Glenn Buchanan and Mark Stockwell swum the butterfly and freestyle respectively. The Americans were overwhelming favourites, boasting the gold medallists in three of the respective individual events. The hosts easily won the gold by almost four seconds; Evans and the Australians were third, relegated from the silver medal by just 0.02 s by the Canadian team, having been in the bronze medal position at every change. Evans recorded the second-fastest breaststroke split, slower than Lundquist, but quicker than the rest, including Davis.

After the Olympics, Evans returned to Arizona and resumed his studies. In 1985, he represented Australia at the World University Games in Kobe, Japan. The following year, he attempted to qualify for the 1986 Commonwealth Games in Edinburgh after only ten days training. He made the qualifying time, but was omitted. Evans later stated that he felt his admission of having only trained for ten days had lowered his standing in the eyes of the selectors. As a result of being overlooked, Evans retired from competitive swimming.

== Later life ==
In early 1986, Evans won preselection for the Liberal Party in the electoral district of Perth. He contested the seat in the state election, but lost despite a four percent swing against the Australian Labor Party. Evans then travelled around the world studying international market systems, before working in fund management and international investment. He said of his swimming career: "It's not that serious. It's only a race. There's a lot more to be happy and proud for and proud of."

== See also ==
- List of Commonwealth Games medallists in swimming (men)
- List of Olympic medalists in swimming (men)
