= David Lowe (swimmer) =

British swimmer (born 1960)

Personal information
- Born: 28 February 1960 (age 66) Bulawayo, Southern Rhodesia (now Zimbabwe)
- Height: 178 cm (5 ft 10 in)
- Weight: 75 kg (165 lb)
Medal record
Men's swimming
Representing Great Britain
Olympic Games
Bronze medal – third place	1980 Moscow	4×100 m medley
Representing England
Commonwealth Games
Silver medal – second place	1982 Brisbane	4×100 m freestyle
Silver medal – second place	1982 Brisbane	4×200 m freestyle
Silver medal – second place	1982 Brisbane	4×100 m medley

David Lowe (born 28 February 1960) is a retired butterfly and freestyle swimmer.

== Swimming career ==
Born in Southern Rhodesia (now Zimbabwe), he represented the United Kingdom at two consecutive Summer Olympics, starting in 1980. At his Olympic debut in Moscow he won the bronze medal in the men's 4×100-meters medley relay, alongside teammates Gary Abraham, Duncan Goodhew, and Martin Smith, clocking 3:47.71.

Although he took part in the 1980 Olympics, he had not set foot in the UK until February 1980, but nonetheless had a British passport.

He represented England and won three silver medals in the 4 x 100 and 4 x 200 metres freestyle relay and the 4 x 100 metres medley relay, at the 1982 Commonwealth Games in Brisbane, Queensland, Australia.

He won the 1984 ASA National Championship 50 metres freestyle title and three titles in the 100 metres freestyle (1982-1984). He also won the 1981 100 metres butterfly title.

== See also ==
- List of Olympic medalists in swimming (men)
