= Swimming at the 1980 Summer Olympics – Men's 4 × 100 metre medley relay =

Men's 4 × 100 metres medley relay at the Games of the XXII Olympiad
- The Australian winning team: Neil Brooks, Mark Tonelli, Peter Evans, and Mark Kerry (left to right)
- Venue: Olympiski Sports Complex
- Dates: 24 July 1980 (heats and final)
- Competitors: 61 from 13 nations
- Teams: 13
- Winning time: 3:45.70

Medalists
1st place, gold medalist(s)		Mark Kerry; Peter Evans; Mark Tonelli; Neil Brooks; Glenn Patching*	Australia
2nd place, silver medalist(s)		Viktor Kuznetsov; Arsens Miskarovs; Yevgeny Seredin; Sergey Kopliakov; Vladimir Shemetov*; Aleksandr Fedorovsky*; Aleksey Markovsky*; Sergey Krasyuk*	Soviet Union
3rd place, bronze medalist(s)		Gary Abraham; Duncan Goodhew; David Lowe; Martin Smith; Paul Marshall*; Mark Taylor*; *Indicates the swimmer only competed in the preliminary heats.	Great Britain

The men's 4 × 100 metre medley relay event at the 1980 Summer Olympics was held in Moscow, Soviet Union on 24 July 1980 in the Olympiski Sports Complex. A total of 13 teams participated in the event. These were split over two heats held in the morning of that day, and the eight fastest teams qualified for the finals held in the evening of the same day.

The United States, the winner of all previous editions of this event, was boycotting the games in response to the Soviet–Afghan War. As a result, the Soviet Union, Great Britain, and Sweden were expected to win. Australia's Quietly Confident Quartet, however, composed of backstroker Mark Kerry, breaststroker Peter Evans, butterflyer Mark Tonelli, and freestyler Neil Brooks, surprisingly won the final in 3:45.70. They were followed by the silver medalists Soviet Union, 0.22 seconds in arrears, and the bronze medalists Great Britain, as favorites Sweden had been disqualified in the heats. Outside of the 2024 event in Paris, this is the only time the United States has not won the gold medal in the event.

== Preview ==
The 1980 Summer Olympic Games were notable for a large number of boycotting countries as a result of the host country invading Afghanistan in 1979. As a result, several medal favorites for the men's 4 × 100 metre medley relay race were absent. The most notable absence was the United States, who had won the event every time since its inception at the 1960 Games, invariably by large margins, and would go on to win the event at all subsequent Games until 2024. Furthermore, they had also obtained the gold medal at the previous World Championships, just two years before the Olympiad. This, together with the boycott of the silver and bronze medallists from the previous edition, West Germany—who won the silver medal also at the World Championships—and Canada respectively, meant that the field had opened.

Sweden, Great Britain, and the Soviet Union were the most heavily favoured teams. Another ten National Olympic Committees were able to send teams to Moscow: Angola, Australia, Brazil, Bulgaria, East Germany, France, Hungary, Netherlands, Spain, and Vietnam. Favorites Soviet Union boasted the silver medalists in the 100 m finals hosted several days earlier in backstroke and breaststroke (Viktor Kuznetsov and Arsens Miskarovs respectively), while their butterflyer (Yevgeny Seredin) and freestyler (Sergey Kopliakov) had come fifth and fourth in their respective 100 m events. The British team included the 100 m breaststroke gold medallist (Duncan Goodhew), and fifth-place finisher in the 100 m backstroke (Gary Abraham). Sweden's butterflyer (Pär Arvidsson) and backstroker (Bengt Baron) had won their respective 100 m events, and their freestyle swimmer (Per Holmertz) had come second in the 100 m, while their lowest ranked swimmer, the breaststroker (Peter Berggren), had come ninth in the 100 m event.

The Australians were regarded as an outside chance for a medal, but were not seen as the main threats, as they were ranked seventh coming into the Olympics out of the 13 competing countries. In the five times the event had been contested, Australia had only won a silver in the inaugural race in Rome, and a bronze medal in Tokyo in 1964. On paper, Australia's team appeared much weaker than those of the other favorites: Peter Evans was the only individual medalist in the distance, claiming bronze in the 100 m breaststroke, while Neil Brooks, the freestyler, and Mark Kerry, the backstroker, had been eliminated in their respective semifinals, and Mark Tonelli was swimming as a makeshift butterflyer.

== Competition ==
=== Heats ===
The medley relay was scheduled in the Olympiski Sports Complex for Thursday, 24 July, the fifth day of swimming competition, with heats from 11 am, and the final from 9 pm. In the morning Sweden was disqualified in the first heat, while Australia and the Soviet Union competed in the second heat. With their superior depth, the home team was able to rest their entire first-choice quartet in the heats, while Australia was only willing to rest Kerry, with Glenn Patching swimming the backstroke leg in his place. The hosts led the Australians from the start and extended their margin over each of the first three legs. Brooks reclaimed 1.34 s on the freestyle leg, but the Australians fell 0.13 s short to come second in their heat. Nevertheless, the Australians qualified in second place overall, as they and the Soviets were almost 2 s faster than the third-placed Hungarians. In any case, the home team, despite resting all of their first-choice quartet, were still faster than the Australians, who had rested only one. The winners of the first heat, Great Britain, had obtained a time slower than even the fourth-place finisher of the second heat, East Germany, and slower than the Soviets' by almost 3 seconds.

=== Final ===
The Australian Evans took the opportunity to attempt to regain the psychological ascendancy from the Briton Goodhew, confronting him privately and stating that "we will win it", before noting that Goodhew was astounded by his posturing. Tonelli, the eldest swimmer in the Australian quartet at the age of 23, convened the team as its de facto leader, and asked his teammates to commit to swimming their legs in a certain time; Kerry vowed to swim the backstroke in 57 s, Evans the breaststroke in 63 s flat, Tonelli the butterfly in 54 s and Brooks promised to anchor the team in 49.8 s, even though he had never gone faster than 51 s in his career. Tonelli named the foursome as the Quietly Confident Quartet, and they exhibited a silent assurance as they lined up for the race. Whereas most of the other teams were "psyching up" in the marshalling area, the Australians were remaining light-hearted, convinced that they could perform in the final.

Kerry led off the Australian team in a faster time than he had clocked in the individual event, but it was still two seconds slower than his personal best time. Kerry finished in a time of 57.87 s, leaving Australia in fourth place at the end of the first leg. Kuznetsov gave the Soviets the lead with a leadoff leg of 56.81 s with Hungary and Great Britain in second and third place. France was last to reach the 100 m mark, posting a time of 58.84 s. Evans then swam a personal best of 63.01 s, the fastest split among the breaststrokers by 0.63 s. His leg moved Australia into second place at the halfway mark, just 0.45 s behind the hosts and roughly half a second ahead of the British and the Hungarians. The remainder of the teams had been dropped, with a two-second gap back to the fifth-placed East Germans. Tonelli then swam his leg in 54.94 s, almost two seconds faster than he had done over the distance. Tonelli began to lose ground in the last 50 m and was a body length behind until a late surge brought him to within a metre by the end of his leg. Tonelli's butterfly leg was such that if he had swum the same time in the individual event, he would have claimed the silver medal. Although he lost 0.36 s to Seredin, he had minimised his loss and Australia were within 0.81 s going into the final leg. Furthermore, the Australians were now more than a second clear of the third placed Great Britain.

Brooks then made a powerful, well-timed dive and surfaced almost even with his Soviet counterpart Kopliakov. He had drawn level halfway through his leg and made a superior turn to take the lead as they headed home. The Soviet freestyler pulled level with 25 m to go before Brooks sprinted away again to seal an Australian victory by 0.22 s. He did not breathe in the last ten metres, and claimed to be laughing for the final five metres, confident that his opponent could not pass him. Brooks had finished his leg in 49.86 s as he had vowed to his teammates. In doing so, he recorded the fastest freestyle split in the relay, even faster than the individual 100 m freestyle gold medallist, Jörg Woithe of East Germany.

== Aftermath ==
The time of 3 m 45.70 s sealed Australia's first ever win in a medley relay at the Olympics, for men or women, and until 2024 it was the only time that the United States did not win the men's event. After the race, the team made a celebratory dive into the water and performed a poolside interview. Tonelli remarked that "I was totally stunned. After all the hassle, and my being the athletes' mouthpiece, we'd come through and done it". Australia's women's captain Lisa Forrest hailed the win as "a gold medal that should never have been". Evans said of the relay, "It was unbelievable, but it was all so logical. I was so deliriously happy that I couldn't stop talking," as Brooks dedicated his win to his mother, who had died from cancer the previous Christmas.

Upon returning to Australia, Evans and Brooks were raucously received in their hometown of Perth. They were denied a civic reception by the Lord Mayor of Perth, Fred Chaney, because of his stance on Afghanistan, but the Mayor of Fremantle, Bill McKenzie, hosted one instead. Evans also received congratulations from Prime Minister Malcolm Fraser. After being greeted as a hero, Brooks considered retiring as he felt that his gold had diminished his hunger for further success.

The quartet did not compete again as a unit following the Moscow Olympics, as Tonelli retired from swimming immediately after the Games. Australia came third in the 1984 Olympics in the medley relay as the Americans returned to the Olympic fold, with only Evans and Kerry of the original four swimming in the final, while Brooks swam in the heats. Evans and Kerry both retired after the 1984 Olympics, and after Brooks retired in 1986, the last of the Quietly Confident Quartet had departed the Australian swimming scene.

== Records ==
Prior to this competition, the existing world and Olympic records were as follows.

World record	United States (USA); John Naber (55.89); John Hencken (1:02.50); Matt Vogel (54.26); Jim Montgomery (49.57)	3:42.22	Montreal, Canada	22 July 1976
Olympic record	United States; John Naber (55.89); John Hencken (1:02.50); Matt Vogel (54.26); Jim Montgomery (49.57)	3:42.22	Montreal, Canada	22 July 1976

== Results ==
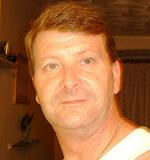
Gary Abraham swam the backstroke leg of the 4 × 100 m medley relay final for Great Britain's bronze winning team.

=== Heats ===
Rank	Heat	Nation	Swimmers	Time	Notes
1	2	Soviet Union	Vladimir Shemetov (58.02); Aleksandr Fedorovski (1:03.91); Aleksei Markovski (55.17); Sergey Krasyuk (51.73)	3:48.83	Q
2	2	Australia	Glenn Patching (58.56); Peter Evans (1:03.96); Mark Tonelli (56.03); Neil Brooks (50.39)	3:48.94	Q
3	2	Hungary	Sándor Wladár (57.51); János Dzvonyár (1:03.80); Zoltán Verrasztó (56.19); Gábor Mészáros (53.04)	3:50.54	Q
4	2	East Germany	Dietmar Göhring (58.43); Jörg Walter (1:05.63); Roger Pyttel (55.24); Frank Kühne (52.10)	3:51.40	Q
5	1	Great Britain	Paul Marshall (59.04); Duncan Goodhew (1:04.44); David Lowe (56.03); Mark Taylor (52.15)	3:51.66	Q
6	2	Netherlands	Fred Eefting (58.20); Albert Boonstra (1:05.28); Cees Vervoorn (55.32); Cees Jan Winkel (53.53)	3:52.33	Q
7	1	France	Frédéric Delcourt (59.38); Olivier Borios (1:05.78); Xavier Savin (55.85); René Ecuyer (51.86)	3:52.87	Q
8	2	Brazil	Romulo Arantes (58.27); Sérgio Pinto Ribeiro (1:06.03); Cláudio Kestener (57.03); Cyro Delgado (51.99)	3:53.32	Q
9	1	Spain	Moises Gonsalvez (1:01.20); Gustavo Torrijos (1:05.96); David López-Zubero (55.04); Ramón Lavín (52.59)	3:54.79	
10	1	Bulgaria	Branimir Popov (1:01.06); Plamen Donchev (1:07.12); Yulian Vasilev (58.03); Tsvetan Golomeev (52.14)	3:58.35	
11	1	Angola	Fernando Lopes (1:14.06); Francisco Santos (1:17.50); Marcos Daniel (1:04.35); Jorge Lima (59.20)	4:35.11	
	1	Sweden	Michael Söderlund; Peter Berggren; Per-Alvar Magnusson; Per Holmertz	DSQ	
	2	Vietnam	Phạm Văn Thành (1:06.99); Nguyễn Mạnh Tuấn (1:10.75); Trương Ngọc Tơn (1:03.07); Tô Văn Vệ	DSQ	

=== Final ===
Rank	Nation	Swimmers	Time	Notes
1st place, gold medalist(s)	Australia	Mark Kerry (57.89); Peter Evans (1:03.01); Mark Tonelli (54.94); Neil Brooks (49.86)	3:45.70	
2nd place, silver medalist(s)	Soviet Union	Viktor Kuznetsov (56.81); Arsens Miskarovs (1:03.64); Yevgeny Seredin (54.58); Sergey Kopliakov (50.89)	3:45.92	
3rd place, bronze medalist(s)	Great Britain	Gary Abraham (57.72); Duncan Goodhew (1:03.73); David Lowe (55.57); Martin Smith (50.69)	3:47.71	
4	East Germany	Dietmar Göhring (58.34); Jörg Walter (1:05.14); Roger Pyttel (54.81); Jörg Woithe (49.96)	3:48.25	
5	France	Frédéric Delcourt (58.84); Olivier Borios (1:05.14); Xavier Savin (55.07); René Ecuyer (50.14)	3:49.19	
6	Hungary	Sándor Wladár (57.30); János Dzvonyár (1:04.12); Zoltán Verrasztó (55.72); Gábor Mészáros (53.15)	3:50.29	
7	Netherlands	Fred Eefting (58.37); Albert Boonstra (1:05.49); Cees Vervoorn (54.92); Cees Jan Winkel (53.03)	3:51.81	
8	Brazil	Romulo Arantes (57.99); Sérgio Pinto Ribeiro (1:05.68); Cláudio Kestener (57.33); Jorge Fernandes (52.24)	3:53.24	
