= Mark Kerry =

Australian swimmer (born 1959)

Personal information
- Full name: Mark Anthony Kerry
- National team: Australia
- Born: 4 August 1959 (age 66) Temora, New South Wales

Sport
- Sport: Swimming
- Strokes: Backstroke, freestyle
- College team: Indiana University; University of Southern California
Medal record
Men's swimming
Representing Australia
Olympic Games
Gold medal – first place	1980 Moscow	4×100 m medley
Bronze medal – third place	1980 Moscow	200 m backstroke
Bronze medal – third place	1984 Los Angeles	4×100 m medley
Summer Universiade
Gold medal – first place	1979 Mexico City	100 m backstroke

Mark Anthony Kerry (born 4 August 1959) is an Australian former backstroke and freestyle swimmer of the 1970s and 1980s, who won three Olympic medals, including a gold in the 4 × 100 m medley relay at the 1980 Summer Olympics as the backstroker for the Quietly Confident Quartet. During his career, he won twelve Australian Championships.

Initially trained by his mother, Kerry enjoyed success in swimming and surf lifesaving as a teenager. His swimming career progressed to senior Australian standards after he switched to the tutelage of John Rigby and moved to Queensland. He made his debut at the 1976 Australian Championships and promptly won the 200 m freestyle and backstroke events to win selection for the 1976 Summer Olympics in Montreal at the age of 16. At the Olympics, Kerry reached the final in two events, coming seventh and fifth in the 100 m and 200 m backstroke respectively. Kerry was disappointed with his performances, but they attracted the attention of American coach Doc Counsilman, who invited Kerry to swim under him at Indiana University. Kerry set Australian records while in the United States, but his international career hit trouble when he was expelled from the 1978 Commonwealth Games team for breaking a curfew.

Kerry returned to Australia in 1980 for the national championships and gained selection for the Moscow Olympics by winning the backstroke double. Kerry declined financial inducements and resisted political pressure from the Australian Government to boycott the Olympics in protest at the Soviet invasion of Afghanistan. He went on to win bronze in the 200 m backstroke after missing the final in the 100 m. The peak of his career came in the 4 × 100 m medley relay, where he led off the winning team. The race remains the only time the United States did not win the event at the Olympics. After the games, Kerry took an extended break from the sport, before returning for the 1984 Summer Olympics in Los Angeles. He claimed a bronze in the medley relay and came fifth in the 100 m backstroke. He then retired and took up a television and modelling career in the United States. After returning to Australia, he ran and owned Dunhill Management, one of the largest recruiting firms in the nation, with his brother. In 2001, the Kerry brothers sold Dunhill for A$22.7 million, with up to A$13.8 million in additional payments depending on the success of the company. They later founded a new recruitment firm, K2.

== Early years ==
Mark Anthony Kerry was born on 4 August 1959 in Temora, New South Wales, near the regional centre of Wagga Wagga. Kerry was one of two sons born to a car salesman, and his mother was a swimming teacher who ran her own aquatic school. Kerry was taught to swim by his mother, whom he regarded as a perfectionist who emphasised technique and turned him to backstroke. Kerry grew up participating in a wide range of sports, representing Wollongong High School in tennis, athletics and swimming. He also competed four times in the state cross-country championships. Once his family had moved to the seaside city of Wollongong, Kerry developed a love of the surf. He found the ocean water much more exciting due to its unpredictability. Kerry steadily rose through the surf lifesaving ranks, competing at the state and national championships. In 1974, Kerry won the Cadet Malibu event in the Australian Championships, and in 1975 he came second in the surf race at the Australian Open Surfing Championships. In the pool, Kerry had his first competitive race at the age of 12 in 1971. At the time, Brad Cooper—who went on to win the 400 m freestyle at the 1972 Summer Olympics—was living in Wollongong and he and Kerry trained together on a regular basis. In 1974, Kerry competed in the Australian Age Championships in freestyle, before moving north to train with John Rigby in Brisbane, Queensland in the following year. At the time of his move, Kerry was ranked around 200th in the world in backstroke.

== International debut: 1976 Olympics ==
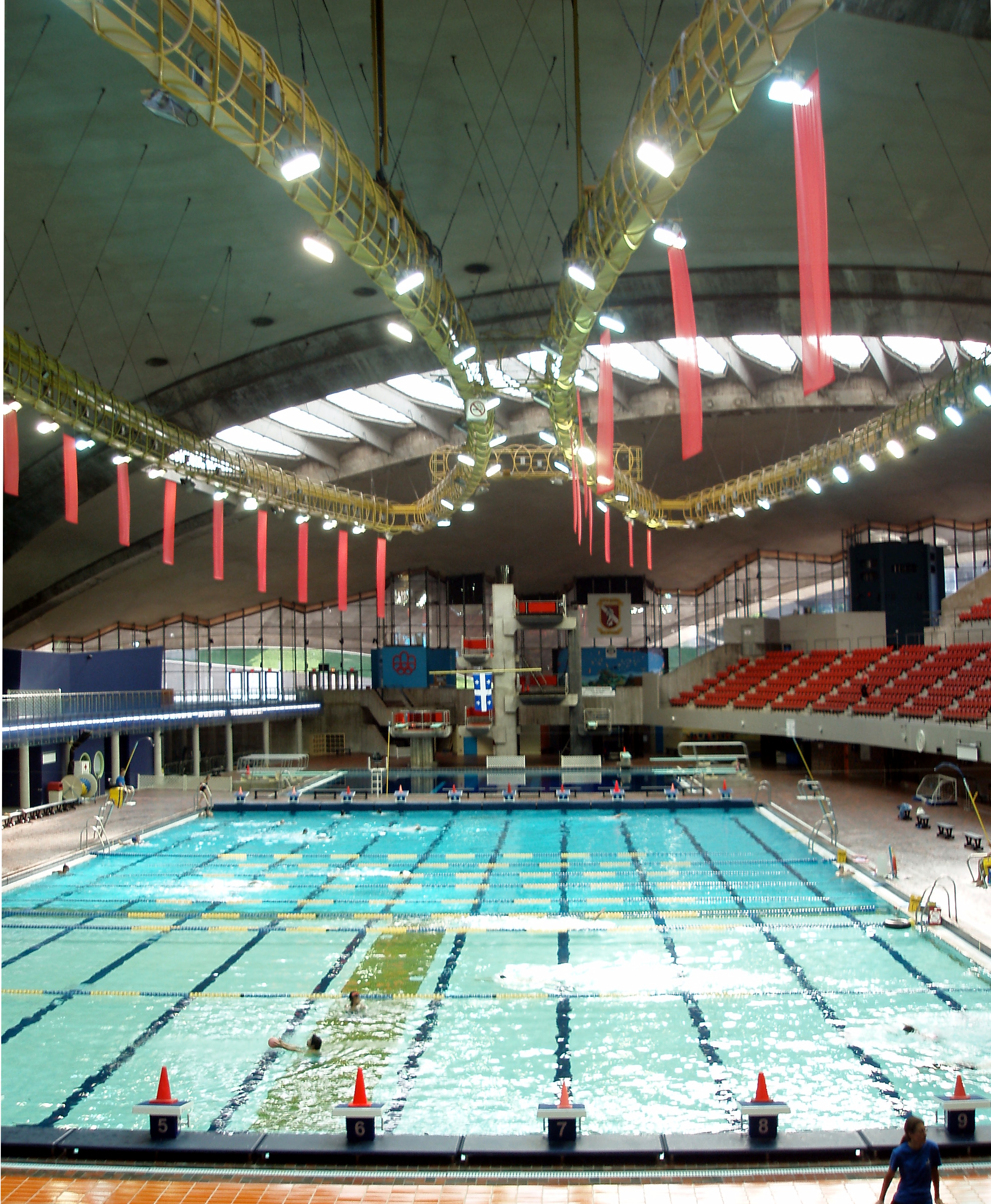
The Olympic pool in Montreal, where Kerry competed in 1976.

Kerry had improved to such an extent that by November 1975, his times in the 200 m backstroke had dropped from around 2 m 10 s to around 2 m 3.0 s, ranking him third in the world. As a result of his strong performances in the pool, Kerry retired from surf racing. Kerry made his debut at the 1976 Australian Championships, winning the 200 m freestyle and backstroke events in 1 m 54.33 s and 2 m 3.58 s respectively, as well as the 4 × 200 m freestyle and the 4 × 100 m medley relays for New South Wales, leading off both relays. Aged 16, Kerry won selection for the 1976 Summer Olympics in Montreal in the 100 m and 200 m backstroke, the 200 m freestyle, the 4 × 200 m freestyle relay and the 4 × 100 m medley relay.

Kerry was second in his heat of the 200 m freestyle heat in a time of 1 m 54.86 s, but was four seconds off the pace and did not qualify for the final. His time was 2.08 s behind the slowest qualifier, placing him 16th. Kerry did not get to swim in the 4 × 200 m freestyle relay. The fastest Australian in the corresponding individual event, he was rested in the qualifying round; Australia came third in their heat and ninth overall to miss the final by 1.88 s after Peter Dawson swam his split in a time four seconds slower than Kerry's effort in the individual event. Had Kerry repeated his individual time in the relay in place of Dawson, Australia would have qualified fifth.

Kerry found more success in the 100 m backstroke, winning his heat in 57.99 s to qualify third fastest for the semifinals. He then scraped into the final as the second slowest qualifier, after coming fourth in his semifinal in a time of 58.04 s. His time of 57.94 s placed him seventh in the final, ahead of fellow Australian Mark Tonelli, but more than two seconds behind the victorious John Naber of the United States. In the 200 m event, Kerry put in a personal best time of 2 m 3.58 s in the first heat to qualify fourth fastest for the final, but swam slower in the decider to finish fifth in a time of 2 m 4.07 s, one place behind Tonelli and 2.72 s away from bronze. Kerry combined with Paul Jarvie, Neil Rogers and Peter Coughlan in the 4 × 100 m medley relay, placing sixth. The quartet qualified in sixth place, and Kerry had them in fourth place after posting a time of 57.94 s in the first leg, but his teammates were unable to keep up with the leaders and finished more than four seconds out of medal contention.

Kerry was disappointed with his performances, feeling that he had failed to perform to his potential amid the pressure and excitement of an Olympics. However, he felt that his experience of racing against the likes of Naber and Roland Matthes would hold him in good stead. On a brighter note, Kerry's performances impressed the leading American coach Doc Counsilman, who invited him to come and swim at Indiana University after Kerry finished his secondary schooling in Australia. Kerry successfully defended his 200 m backstroke national title in 1977, but the time was more than four seconds slower than his effort in the previous year. He combined with his New South Wales teammates to win all three relays, again in times substantially slower than in the preceding Olympic year. The performances earned him selection for the Australian team for the Coca-Cola Meet in London, but Kerry felt that he lacked motivation after the Olympics. Upon returning, he decided to absent himself from such events.

== US college stint and expulsion for disciplinary issues ==
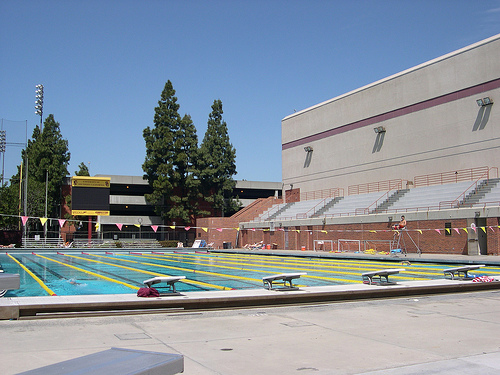
The swimming pool at the University of Southern California, where Kerry trained.

In January 1978, Kerry arrived at Indiana University, studying theatre, drama and telecommunications. Based on the times that he recorded for Indiana, Kerry was named in the Australian squad for the 1978 Commonwealth Games in Edmonton, Canada. However, his international career appeared to be in disarray when along with two teammates, Tonelli and Joe Dixon, he was expelled from the Australian team for breaking a curfew on American Independence Day during a training camp in Honolulu, Hawaii. According to Tonelli, Kerry was late because he was courting a female he had met, while Tonelli and Dixon had been drinking. Tonelli also admitted to the officials that he had smoked marijuana—not illegal under Hawaii law—on the night. In the aftermath of the incident, Tonelli appeared on Australian television, strongly denying rumours that he had been involved in a drug-fuelled orgy with teammates. He admitted to smoking marijuana, but defended his actions, saying that it was not illegal. Supporters in Australia, including future Prime Minister Bob Hawke, launched a petition for the reinstatement of the trio, which garnered thousands of signatures, but to no avail.

Kerry returned to Indiana and continued his training. He competed at the 1979 U.S. National Championships at Fort Lauderdale, setting Australian records in the 100 m and 200 m backstroke in times of 56.50 s and 2 m 2.61 s respectively. Over time, Kerry became increasingly discontented with Counsilman, who he felt was losing focus and becoming preoccupied with various business commitments and an attempt to swim across the English Channel. Kerry transferred to the University of Southern California, which was coached by Naber's mentor Peter Daland.

== 1980 Olympics ==
Kerry returned home to compete in the 1980 Australian Championships, winning both backstroke events, albeit in a slower time than his Australian records. Kerry added two titles as a member of the 4 × 100 m medley and freestyle relay teams for New South Wales. This earned Kerry his second trip to the Olympics, this time in Moscow. However, another obstacle arose with the Soviet invasion of Afghanistan, which resulted in a boycott of the Games by a large part of the Western world, led by the United States. The Australian Prime Minister Malcolm Fraser was also the patron of the Australian Olympic Committee, and significant political pressure came to bear on the athletes to boycott the Games. Kerry's teammate Tonelli, however, realised that only the sportspeople would suffer from a boycott and that trade relations would continue unabated. He took a leadership role among the athletes to fight for their right to compete. Kerry was equally adamant that he was going to compete, unlike some other swimmers who made personal boycotts. He received offers from Australian government officials to boycott the Games in return for financial payments. He said:

I felt the biggest statement we could make was to go to Moscow and show the world. If there was a total boycott, fine, but trade was still going on. It was disgusting. Why should the athletes be made to suffer?

Upon leaving the US for the Olympics, Kerry was threatened with the cancellation of his US visa. Kerry arrived in Moscow facing a four event schedule: he was nominated in both backstroke events and the 4 × 200 m freestyle relay and the 4 × 100 m medley relay. With the Americans and many other western swimmers absent, Australian officials were confident that their three entrants in the 100 m backstroke, Kerry, Tonelli and Glenn Patching, would all make the final and win medals. Kerry came in third both in his heat and in the semi-final, clocking 58.08 s and 58.07 s respectively, missing out on the final by just 0.02 s. He was the ninth fastest in the closely run semifinals, with the third fastest qualifier being only 0.18 s faster. Patching missed the final after slipping on the starting wall in his race, while Tonelli went on to finish seventh. Had Kerry matched his personal best of 65.50 s, he would have won the gold medal ahead of Sweden's Bengt Baron.

Kerry bounced back in the 200 m backstroke and won his heat to qualify third-fastest, before claiming bronze in a time of 2 m 3.14 s behind the Hungarian duo of Sándor Wladár and Zoltán Verrasztó. He edged out the Soviet Union's Vladimir Shemetov by 0.34 s, becoming the first Australian to win a medal in an individual backstroke event since David Theile in 1960. In the 4 × 200 m freestyle relay, he combined with Tonelli, Graeme Brewer and Ron McKeon as Australia came seventh after qualifying fourth. The Australians were sixth at the halfway point when Kerry jumped in for the third leg. Kerry moved Australia into fifth by the end of his leg, just 0.78 s from the bronze medal position, after posting a split time of 1 m 52.64 s, the 18th fastest split in the race. However, McKeon could not keep pace with the opposition anchor swimmers, and Australia finished seventh, 1.52 s outside the medals.

=== Relay victory ===
The 4 × 100 m medley relay was the focal point of Kerry's Moscow campaign. The event had always been won by the United States since its inception at Olympic level in 1960, and their boycott had opened up the field in the event. In the five times the event had been contested, Australia's best result was a silver in the inaugural race. A bronze in 1964 was the only other medal success and the 1976 edition of the medley relay had seen Australia eliminated in the heats. This time, Australia was regarded as a medal chance, but was not seen as the main threats—Sweden, Great Britain and the Soviet Union were seen as the most likely winners. The host's team included the silver medallists in the 100 m backstroke and breaststroke, and their butterflyer had come fifth; their freestyler would later place fourth. The British had Duncan Goodhew, the breaststroke gold medallist, while Sweden's butterflyer and backstroker had won their respective events and their freestyle swimmer would come second in the 100 m. Australia's team paled in comparison on paper. Neil Brooks, the freestyler, later came 14th overall after having an asthma attack, and Peter Evans was the only individual medallist in the corresponding individual event. Kerry had been eliminated in the backstroke semifinals, while Tonelli was swimming as a makeshift butterflyer, despite having performed better than Kerry in the 100 m backstroke. Adding to the pressure was that Australia won no gold medals at the 1976 Olympics in any sport, and were yet to win in Moscow, so the public were still awaiting their first victory since Munich in 1972. Coming into the Olympics, Australia were ranked seventh out of the thirteen competing countries.

Australia's prospects improved after the morning heats in which Sweden was disqualified. Tonelli, the eldest swimmer in the quartet at the age of 23, convened the team as its de facto leader. He asked his teammates to commit to swimming their legs in a certain time; Kerry vowed to swim the backstroke in 57 s, Evans the breaststroke in 63 s flat, Tonelli the butterfly in 54 s and Brooks promised to anchor the team in 49.8 s, even though he had never gone faster than 51 s. Tonelli named the foursome as the Quietly Confident Quartet, and they exhibited a quiet confidence as they lined up for the race.

As Patching had slipped earlier in the meet, Kerry decided to rub a sticky red substance onto the soles of his feet. The Soviet hosts had installed a carpet following the incidents, resulting in Kerry leaving red footprints in the stadium. Kerry led off in a time faster than his effort in the individual event, but it was still two seconds slower than his personal best time of 57.87 s, leaving Australia in fourth place at the end of the first leg. Evans then swam a personal best of 63.01 s, drawing Australia almost level with the host nation at the halfway mark. Tonelli swam his leg in 54.94 s, almost two seconds faster than he had done over the distance. Tonelli did so with an uneven arm technique due to the uneven strength in his arms. He began to lose ground in the last 50 m and was a bodylength behind until a late surge brought him to within a metre by the end of his leg. Brooks then executed a powerful, well-timed dive and surfaced almost even with his Soviet counterpart. He had drawn level by the halfway mark and made a superior turn to take the lead. The Soviet freestyler pulled level at the 25 m mark before Brooks again sprinted away to seal an Australian victory by 0.22 s. Brooks had finished his leg in 49.86 s as he had vowed to his teammates. The time of 3 m 45.70 s sealed Australia's first ever win in a medley relay at the Olympics, for men or women. The team then made a celebratory dive into the pool and were interviewed poolside. In 2000, Kerry and the other members of the quartet were each awarded the Australian Sports Medal for their victory in Moscow.

== Break and comeback ==
After the Olympics, Kerry took an extended break from competitive swimming. He was asked to return for the 1982 Commonwealth Games in Brisbane, so he made a comeback, but did only two weeks of solid training and missed selection, failing to win either backstroke event. In 1983, he began preparing for the Olympics, but did not start serious work until October. Kerry was confident in his ability to perform at international standards with sporadic preparation after long sabbaticals. He attributed this to his technique and ability to keep his 190 cm, 80 kg body in shape while not training.

He returned to Australia in 1984 and after training in Brisbane, he was selected for the 1984 Summer Olympics in Los Angeles despite winning neither backstroke event at the Australian Championships. Arriving in the United States, Kerry was scheduled to compete in the 100 m backstroke and 4 × 100 m medley relay. Kerry swam quickly to win his heat in the 100 m in a time of 57.15 s, qualifying third fastest for the final. However, he was unable to improve his pace in the final, finishing fifth in a time of 57.18 s, 0.69 s from the bronze medal. In the medley relay, Kerry and Evans joined Glenn Buchanan and Mark Stockwell, who swam the butterfly and freestyle respectively. They were no match for the Americans, who had three of the four gold medallists in the corresponding individual events and finished almost four seconds ahead. Kerry had Australia in third place at the first change, finishing his leg in a time of 57.12 s, but by this point the Americans were already 1.71 s ahead. Australia remained third at every change and were beaten by the second-placed Canadians by just 0.02 s.

== After swimming ==
After the Games, Kerry retired from competitive swimming. He then worked in Los Angeles as a model and hosted a fashion show on cable television. According to Tonelli, Kerry's mother told her son to "look after that face, [because] that's all you've got". Tonelli disagreed, opining that "he was always much more than that". Tonelli reported that Kerry was busy preening himself just before the start of their Olympic-winning relay performance, claiming that although Australia was unlikely to win the race, he needed to look good because a prospective employer might be watching. Kerry went on to model on the catwalks of Milan and Paris.

Kerry married his American wife Lynda, and they split their time between Australia and the United States. They have two children, a son Tanner who is a semi-professional basketball player, and a daughter Madison, who is an actress appearing on Home and Away. Along with his brother Phil, Kerry founded Dunhill Management, one of Australia's largest recruiting firms. In 2001, the brothers sold Dunhill to the British firm Robert Walters for A$22.7 million, with up to A$13.8 million in extra payments depending on the future success of the company. After this, Kerry worked as the managing director of another firm, before starting a new recruitment business with his brother, K2 Recruitment & Consulting.

== See also ==
- List of Olympic medalists in swimming (men)

== Bibliography ==
- Andrews, Malcolm (2000). Australia at the Olympic Games. Sydney, New South Wales: Australian Broadcasting Corporation. ISBN 0-7333-0884-8.
- Forrest, Lisa (2008). Boycott. Sydney, New South Wales: Australian Broadcasting Corporation. ISBN 978-0-7333-2295-2.
- Gordon, Harry (1994). Australia and the Olympic Games. St Lucia, Queensland: University of Queensland. ISBN 0-7022-2627-0.
- Howell, Max (1986). Aussie Gold. Albion, Queensland: Brooks Waterloo. ISBN 0-86440-680-0.
- Tonelli, Mark (2008). Tougher than nails: swimming through turbulence (PDF). Mark Tonelli. Archived from the original (PDF) on 14 July 2011.
