= Taylor MH =

British swimmer

Michael Taylor
- Born: Stourbridge, England
- Citizenship: United Kingdom
- Occupations: swimmer, public speaker, author
- Spouse: Helen Taylor
- Writing career
- Language: English
- Subject: multiple sclerosis
- Website: www.domainofopportunity.com

Mike Taylor, also known by the alias Taylor MH, is an English athlete, public speaker, and author from Stourbridge, England. After being diagnosed with multiple sclerosis (MS) at the age of 26, he became the first person with MS to successfully swim a relay of the English Channel in 1997. Despite being unable to use his legs, he later completed a swimming relay of Loch Lomond in Scotland, a relay from Majorca to Menorca in the Balearic Islands, and three team relays from Santa Catalina Island to Santa Monica in California. In each case he raised funds to donate to non-profits such as the Multiple Sclerosis Society and the Myelin Research Project. He also founded the MS charity foundation Turning the Tides (TTT). Taylor is a frequent public speaker and has announced that he is releasing his memoir Making a Splash on History Publishing in 2012.

== Early life ==
Michael Taylor was born in 1964 to Graham and Brenda Taylor of Pedmore, Stourbridge England. He is the youngest of three children, and at an early age had a strong affinity for sports, stating "as a child I drove everyone mad – I was always up to mischief; I lived outdoors, doing sports or riding my motocross bike." As a child he participated in cricket and mountain biked, and in school he played rugby for the Stourbridge Rugby Club and ran for the Midlands. He also hiked and skied.

Taylor has also stated he loved water and watersports from a young age, saying "At the age of three, much to the horror of my mother, my uncle threw me in at the local pool and I simply swam to the ladder with a big grin on my face. From that moment I never looked back. I was never trained to swim, it came naturally." He swam competitively in school, later rowed for a Birmingham club, and picked up windsurfing and water skiing.

== Early career ==
After obtaining a degree in graphic design at Canterbury, Taylor moved to London to begin his career. While working as a graphic designer for a large London agency he temporarily lost sight in his left eye, and assumed it was stress. At age 26 he was given the opportunity to travel, and purchased a cheap ticket to travel the world, working in multiple countries. He ended up working in a design company in Perth, Australia, before eventually moving back to London to join as a creative director at the multinational company Interbrand.

=== MS diagnosis ===
While travelling, and a few months after he had temporarily lost his sight in his left eye, Taylor developed a slight limp, and assumed it was an old sporting injury. Upon his return to London he found subways and buses increasingly difficult, and finally went to a sports physiotherapist for treatment in 1993. He was diagnosed with multiple sclerosis at the age of 27.

Multiple sclerosis (MS) is currently untreatable and leads to physical degeneration. However, Taylor attempted to continue living as normal; he fixed a string to the gear lever of his racing bike so he could continue to use it, bought his first house, and started his own graphic design company, "Spirit Partnership." Taylor's limp continued to progress to the point that within three months he needed a walking stick. A few years later he needed to use a wheelchair, and has stated "I was at rock bottom. It was like my life was over."

== Swimming events ==
=== English Channel relay ===
Training

Taylor became determined to regain his fitness, and found that cold water relieved some of the pain and cramps of MS. In 1997, at the age of 32, he had moved to Lavender Garden, Battersea. He also began training at the Tooting Bec Lido, the largest open-air unheated swimming pool in London. However, he stated "I got bored swimming up and down in a pool all the time and decided to stretch myself further," and began a five-month training regime to swim the English Channel. He placed an advertisement on the Tooting Bec Lido notice board for volunteers to join him in a relay, and began training with five other swimmers for the 21-mile swim.

The swim

Taylor's relay swim across the English Channel took place on 11 August 1997. He used a special wet suit shorts to keep his legs afloat, and the team left from Dover and ended in Calais, France. Among Taylor's fellow relayers were Alistair Park, Hilary Kempton, Margy Sullivan, John Coningham-Rolls and Veronique Dochain, each taking hour-long shifts in the water while the rest paced alongside in a boat. Taylor stated "I was the first to swim in the water and I was terrified. I set off just before 4 am and it was pitch black. I swam for the first hour and then the others, who were on a boat, took it in turns. It took about 13 hours and 42 minutes. When we arrived, we shook the hands of French people, they were lying on the beach and wondering what the hell was going on. We had champagne on the boat. It was the best."

Taylor was the first man with diagnosed MS to take part in a swim across the English Channel. He and his fellow swimmers fundraised more than £30,000 for the Multiple Sclerosis Society and the Myelin Research Project.

=== Loch Lomond relay ===
In 1998, Taylor took part in a second 22-mile swimming relay across Scotland's Loch Lomond.

=== Mediterranean relay ===
Taylor and his team continued to train at the Tooting Bec Lido, and in 1998 they undertook a 25-mile swim from Majorca to Menorca in the Balearic Islands of the Mediterranean Sea. Taylor, at that point 33 years old, swam two hours in the relay and stated "It was the most incredible and exhausting swim of my life. At the beginning the sea was like a mill pond, but when the wind picked up – swimming through very choppy waters became a real test of fitness. It was like swimming uphill."

=== California relays ===
On 18 September 1999, Taylor and his relay team swam off the coast of California from Santa Catalina Island to Santa Monica. The relay lasted over 17 1/2 hours for 38 miles. Taylor stated "During the swim dolphins accompanied us for most of the way, but there was a shark following us for some of the way." The group again used the event to raise funds for MS research, totalling £15,000 for MS research. At that point in his life Taylor lived in Balham, London.

Later iterations

Taylor has organised and participated in the Catalina swim three times. When it took place again on 29 September 2001, there were eight international relay teams participating, each team with one swimmer with MS. Former Olympic medalist Duncan Goodhew swam with Taylor on his team. Proceeds from fund-raising were all donated the Myelin Project.

== Turning the Tides ==
Taylor co-founded the international charity foundation "Turning the Tides" (TTT). The organisation's stated goal is to support positive, result-driven MS Research, particularly in the Phase One Trial stage of research in MS Repair, which many major establishments have overlooked for its potential risk. In particular TTT is known for organising fund raising events that have reached global audiences in the millions, and helping fund myelin replacement research by Dr. Timothy Vollmer of Yale University. In 2004 The Charity Commissioners approved a request from Taylor and other TTT trustees to close down TTT as a separate entity and transfer funds to the Multiple Sclerosis Resource Center (MSRC).

== Public speaking ==
Taylor has spent much of his career living with MS, and while he had never done public speaking prior to his diagnosis, he soon became an active public speaker. He has stated he loves it and enjoys the benefits others get from him, saying "Frankly, most people don't have a disability as dramatic as MS. They see themselves as 'not enough' – not thin enough, not creative enough, not smart enough, not educated enough – whatever. And they become obsessed with their 'not enough-ness.' So life just continues to agree with them. It's a self-fulfilling prophesy, isn't it? Life is to be lived and I encourage people to live it." His signature speech is titled The Domain of Opportunity – a Simple Shift of Focus.

== Memoir ==
Taylor is currently in the process of writing a book about his experiences. Titled Making a Splash, it is set to be released by History Publishing in 2012.

== Personal life ==
Taylor currently lives in Los Angeles with his wife Helen, a local Californian whom he met after his third Santa Monica relay.

== See also ==
- English Channel crossings
- List of successful English Channel swimmers
