= Luke Quinlivan =

Australian water polo player

Personal information
- Born: August 20, 1985 (age 41) Perth, Western Australia, Australia

Sport
- Sport: Water polo
Medal record
Representing Australia
Summer Universiade
Gold medal – first place	2009 Belgrade	Team competition

Luke Quinlivan (born 20 August 1985 in Perth) is an Australian water polo player who plays as a goalkeeper. He was part of the Australian water polo team that won the gold medal at the World University Games in Serbia in 2009 and won a FINA Water Polo World League bronze medal in 2007 in Germany and in 2008 in Italy.

== Private life ==
Quinlivan's parents are Neil Brooks, and Lynette Quinlivan. He attended Aquinas College, Perth and was then awarded a full sporting scholarship at the Australian Institute of Sport in Canberra for water polo between 2002 and 2005. Quinlivan has been studying a Bachelor of Communications specialising in journalism at Edith Cowan University.

== Water polo career ==
In December 2008 Quinlivan competed in the Tom Hoad Cup in a composite team called the "Barbarians" which he captained. The team won the gold medal in the international competition.

Despite being in the final 15, he was dropped from Australian selection for the 2008 Beijing Olympics.

Quinlivan played in the 2008-2009 Australian National Water Polo League (NWPL) competition for the Victorian Tigers. The Tigers won the Southern Cross Trophy for the men's competition, which means at the end of the fixtured competition they were the winning team. They eventually placed fifth.

He represented Australia at the World University Games in Belgrade, Serbia in July 2009. He saved a penalty shot in the men's semi-final game to help the Australian team win and progress to the gold medal play off.

Australia won the men's gold medal final against Croatia 6-4. This is the first time an open men's Australian water polo team has won a gold medal at a major international tournament. Quinlivan had an 81% save rate in the final against Croatia.

Quinlivan represented Australia at the 2009 FINA World Championships in Rome.
