= Mark Taylor (swimmer) =

British swimmer

Personal information
- Nationality: British (Welsh)
- Born: 24 September 1960 (age 65)
- Height: 182 cm (6 ft 0 in)
- Weight: 76 kg (168 lb)

Sport
- Sport: Swimming

Mark Graham Taylor (born 24 September 1960) is a retired British international swimmer who competed at the 1980 Summer Olympics.

== Biography ==
At the 1980 Olympic Games in Moscow, Taylor competed in three events; the 100 metres freestyle, freestyle relay and medley relay.

He won the 1981 British Championship in 200 metres freestyle.
