= Yevgeny Seredin =

Personal information
- Born: 10 February 1958 Volzhsky, Volgograd Oblast, Russia
- Died: 5 April 2006 (aged 48) Saint Petersburg, Russia
- Height: 181 cm (5 ft 11 in)
- Weight: 73 kg (161 lb)

Sport
- Sport: Swimming
- Events: Butterfly, freestyle
- Club: Trud

Achievements and titles
- Personal best: 100 m butterfly – 55.35 (1980)
Medal record
Representing the Soviet Union
Olympic Games
Silver medal – second place	1980 Moskva	4×100 m medley relay

Yevgeny Alekseyevich Seredin (Russian: Евгений Алексеевич Середин; 10 February 1958 – 5 April 2006) was a Russian swimmer who competed in the 1976 and 1980 Summer Olympics. In 1980, he won a silver medal in the 4×100 m medley relay and placed fifth in the individual 100 m butterfly event. He held eight Soviet titles: in the 100 m butterfly (1976, 1978–79), medley relay (1977–79), and 4×100 m and 4×200 m freestyle relays (1979). After retiring in 1983, Seredin coached swimmers in Saint Petersburg. He died of a heart attack.
