= Glenn Buchanan =

Australian swimmer

Personal information
- Full name: Glenn Robert Buchanan
- National team: Australia
- Born: 19 November 1962 (age 63) Townsville, Queensland
- Height: 1.80 m (5 ft 11 in)
- Weight: 77 kg (170 lb)

Sport
- Sport: Swimming
- Strokes: butterfly
- Club: Carlisle SC
Medal record
Men's swimming
Representing Australia
Olympic Games
Bronze medal – third place	1984 Los Angeles	100 m butterfly
Bronze medal – third place	1984 Los Angeles	4x100 m medley

Glenn Robert Buchanan (born 19 November 1962) is an Australian former butterfly swimmer of the 1980s who won two bronze medals in the 100-metre butterfly and the 4x100-metre medley relay, at the 1984 Summer Olympics in Los Angeles.

Pitted against the United States' world record-holder Pablo Morales and West Germany's Michael Gross, Buchanan swam at such a pace in a vain attempt to keep up that he broke the Australian record, finishing 0.77 of a second behind Gross, who set a new world record. Each of the first six finishers had improved their respective national records. Buchanan then combined with Mark Stockwell, Peter Evans and Mark Kerry to claim another bronze in the 4x100-metre medley relay.

Buchanan continues to reside in Townsville and runs a swim school.

== See also ==
- List of Olympic medalists in swimming (men)
