= Xavier Savin =

French swimmer

Personal information
- Nationality: French
- Born: 15 June 1960 (age 66)

Sport
- Sport: Swimming

Xavier Savin (born 15 June 1960) is a French butterfly swimmer. He competed at the 1980 Summer Olympics and the 1984 Summer Olympics.
