= Gary Abraham =

British swimmer (born 1959)

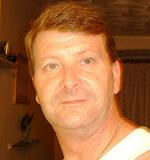

Personal information
- Full name: Gary Abraham
- National team: Great Britain
- Born: 8 January 1959 (age 67) Southampton, England
- Height: 1.75 m (5 ft 9 in)
- Weight: 64 kg (141 lb; 10.1 st)

Sport
- Sport: Swimming
- Strokes: Backstroke, butterfly
- Club: Southampton Swimming Club
- College team: University of Miami
Medal record
Men's swimming
Representing Great Britain
Olympic Games
Bronze medal – third place	1980 Moscow	4×100 m medley
World Championships - Long Course
Bronze medal – third place	1978 Berlin	4×100 m medley
Representing England
Commonwealth Games
Silver medal – second place	1978 Edmonton	100 m backstroke
Silver medal – second place	1978 Edmonton	4×100 m medley

Gary Abraham (born 8 January 1959) is an English former competitive swimmer.

== Swimming career ==
Abraham represented Great Britain in the Olympics and FINA world championships, as well as England in the Commonwealth games, during the 1970s and early 1980s. Abraham was an Olympic Games and Commonwealth Games medallist. As a 17-year-old, Abraham represented Great Britain at the 1976 Summer Olympics in Montreal, Quebec. He competed in the 100-metre backstroke, and swam the backstroke leg for the British team in the preliminary heats of the men's 4x100-metre medley relay.

Abraham represented England at the 1978 Commonwealth Games in Edmonton, Alberta, Canada, winning two silver medals in the 100-metre backstroke and the 4x100-metre medley relay. At the ASA National British Championships he won the 100 metres backstroke title six times (1975, 1976, 1977, 1978, 1979, 1981) and the 200 metres backstroke title in 1978.

At the 1980 Summer Olympics in Moscow, he earned a bronze medal by swimming the backstroke leg for the third-place British team in the 4×100-metre medley relay. He was the first swimmer to utilise the rule permitting swimmers to swim 15 metres underwater at the start of certain events.

Abraham retired from competitive swimming in 1983. He currently coaches at Eastleigh Swimming Club.

== Personal bests ==
Long course (50 m)

Event	Time	Date	Meet	Location	Ref
100 m butterfly	55.42	23 August 1980	Olympic Games	Moscow, Russia	Watch on YouTube
100 m backstroke	57.72	24 August 1980	Olympic Games	Moscow, Russia	

Short course (33m)

Event	Time	Date	Meet	Location	Ref
110 yd backstroke	59.80	March 1981	Hampshire County Championships	Southampton, Great Britain	Source

Short course (25 m)

Event	Time	Date	Meet	Location	Ref
100 m butterfly	58.79	March 1982	Hampshire County Championships	Southampton, Great Britain	Source
100 m backstroke	1:00:00	March 1978	Hampshire County Championships	Southampton, Great Britain	Source

== See also ==
- List of Commonwealth Games medallists in swimming (men)
- List of Olympic medalists in swimming (men)
