= Peter Berggren =

Swedish swimmer

Personal information
- Born: March 28, 1962 (age 64) Uddevalla, Västra Götaland

Sport
- Sport: Swimming
- Strokes: Breaststroke
- Club: Skärets SS

Lars Peter Berggren (born 28 March 1962) is a former Swedish Olympic swimmer. He competed at the 1980 Summer Olympics and the 1984 Summer Olympics. His best individual result was a 7th place in the men's 200 m breaststroke event in 1980.

== Clubs ==
- Skärets SS
