= Duncan Goodhew =

English swimmer (born 1957)

Duncan Goodhew MBE
Personal information
- Full name: Duncan Alexander Goodhew
- Nickname: Jonny Reav
- National team: United Kingdom
- Born: 27 May 1957 (age 69) Marylebone, London, England
- Height: 6 ft (183 cm)
- Weight: 12 st 8 lb; 80 kg (176 lb)

Sport
- Sport: Swimming
- Strokes: Breaststroke
- College team: North Carolina State University
- Coach: Don Easterling (NCSU)
Medal record
Men's swimming
Representing Great Britain
Olympic Games
Gold medal – first place	1980 Moscow	100 m breaststroke
Bronze medal – third place	1980 Moscow	4×100 m medley
World Championships - Long Course
Bronze medal – third place	1978 Berlin	4×100 m medley
European Championships - Long Course
Bronze medal – third place	1977 Jönköping	4×100 m medley
Summer Universiade
Silver medal – second place	1977 Sofia	100 m breaststroke
Representing England
Commonwealth Games
Silver medal – second place	1978 Edmonton	100 m breaststroke
Silver medal – second place	1978 Edmonton	200 m breaststroke
Silver medal – second place	1978 Edmonton	4×100 m medley

Duncan Alexander Goodhew (born 27 May 1957) is an English former swimmer. After swimming competitively in America as a collegian at North Carolina State University, he represented Great Britain at the Olympics and won gold and bronze medals at the 1980 Summer Olympics in Moscow. He also participated in the 1976 Summer Olympics.

== Early life ==
Goodhew attended Windlesham House School and Millfield School (Walton House).

At the age of 10, he fell 18 feet from a tree, a traumatic event which damaged a nerve in his lip and triggered permanent hair loss due to alopecia universalis.

He was diagnosed with dyslexia at the age of 13.

== Career ==
Goodhew came to prominence as an international swimmer in 1976, finishing 7th in the 100m breaststroke at the Montreal Olympics that summer. Four years later, in the 1980 Moscow Olympics, he won gold in the 100m breaststroke, in a time of 1:03.34, and a bronze in the 4x100m medley relay. He represented England and won three silver medals in the breaststroke events and medley relay, at the 1978 Commonwealth Games in Edmonton, Alberta, Canada. At the ASA National British Championships he won the 100 metres breaststroke title in 1976, 1978 and 1980 and the 200 metres breaststroke title in 1976, 1978 and 1980.

As an undergraduate swimmer at North Carolina State University in the mid-70's, Goodhew was mentored by North Carolina State swimming Coach Don Easterling who led the team from 1971 to 1995. Coach Easterling's North Carolina State teams won twelve straight Atlantic Coast Conference Championships from 1971 through 1982.

Goodhew was selected by the British Bobsleigh Association to represent Great Britain at the 1981 European Championships.

He is also an author and motivational speaker. In 1983 he was appointed an MBE by Queen Elizabeth II for services to sport. In 1987 he participated in Prince Edward's charity television special The Grand Knockout Tournament.

Goodhew's 100m breaststroke gold medal achievement was ranked 99th in the British network Channel 4's 100 Greatest Sporting Moments in 2002.

On 29 September 2001, Goodhew participated in an international relay off the coast of California from Santa Catalina Island to Santa Monica. Of the eight international relay teams participating, each team had one swimmer with MS. Goodhew swam on the same team as organizer and MS activist Taylor MH. Proceeds from fund-raising were all donated to the Myelin Project.

Goodhew has made a number of television appearances including featuring in several episodes of Dave Gorman's Important Astrology Experiment.

== Personal life ==
Goodhew married Anne Patterson, an American graphic designer from North Carolina, in December 1984, and they have two children.

In 2000, Labour MP Robert Sheldon collapsed in the street and was revived by mouth-to-mouth resuscitation by Goodhew who happened to be passing.

== See also ==
- List of Commonwealth Games medallists in swimming (men)
- List of Olympic medalists in swimming (men)
