= Ivanovsky Monastery, Pskov =

Nunnery in Pskov, Russia

Ivanovsky Monastery
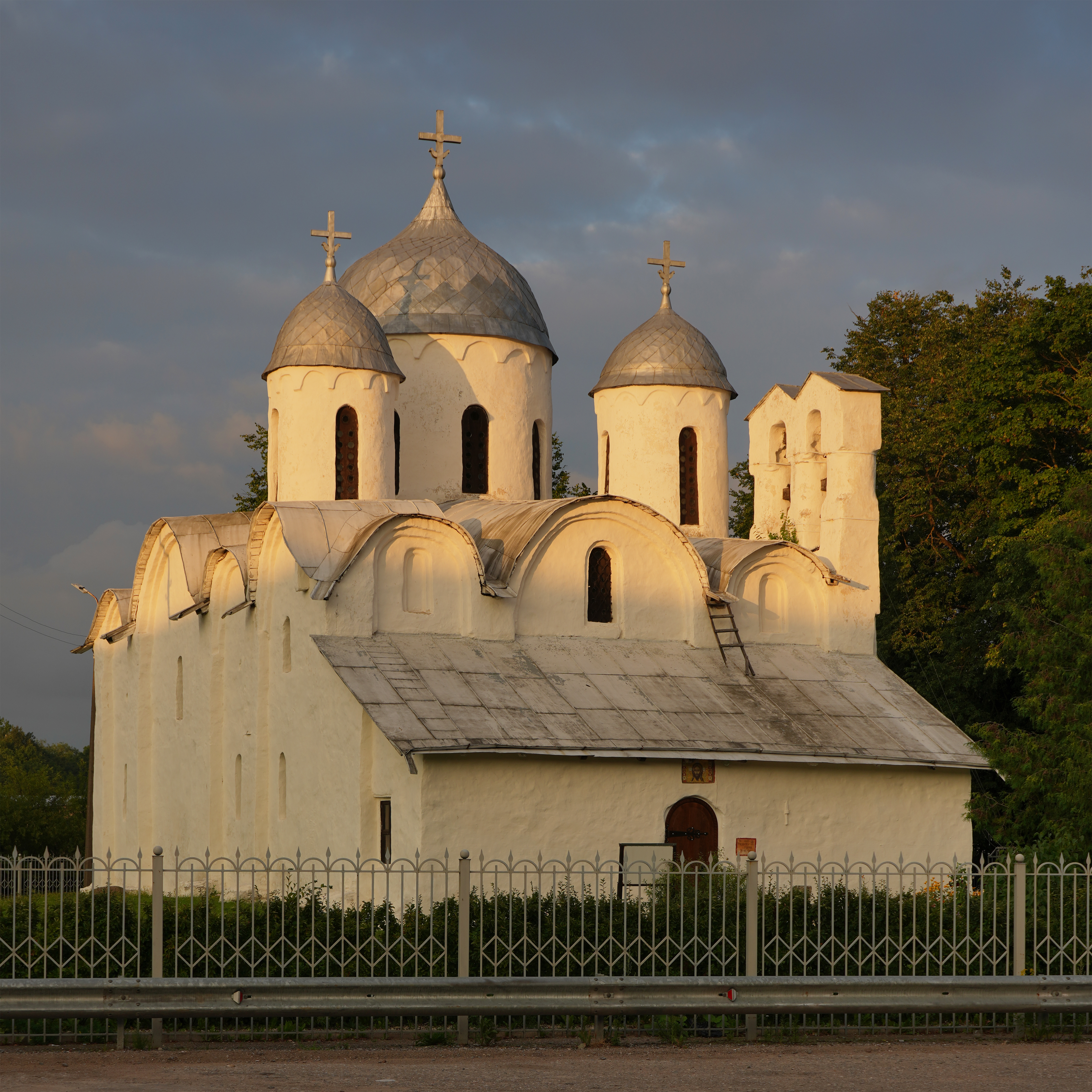
- The katholikon of the monastery
- Interactive map of Ivanovsky Monastery

Monastery information
- Full name: Ивановский монастырь
- Order: Russian Orthodox Church
- Established: 1243
- Disestablished: 1925
- Diocese: Pskov Eparchy

Site
- Location: Pskov, Pskov Oblast, Russia
- Coordinates: 57°49′33″N 28°19′05″E
- Public access: Yes

The Convent of Nativity of Saint John the Baptist (Russian: Ивановский монастырь) is a former Russian Orthodox nunnery in Pskov. It is notable for the katholikon, one of Russia's oldest churches, dating from the first half of the 12th century. The church is located at the city center, on the left bank of the Velikaya River, in the Zavelichye quarter. It currently belongs to Krypetsky Monastery. It is the second oldest building in Pskov after the katholikon of the Mirozhsky Monastery and was designated an architectural monument of federal significance (#6010016003). The Cathedral of Ioann Predtecha is part of the Churches of the Pskov School of Architecture, which became an World Heritage Site in 2019.

== History ==
The construction date of the katholikon is traditionally estimated as the beginning of the 1140s. The studies of local Pskov architect, Sergey Mikhaylov, performed between 1970 and 1980, suggested the dates between 1124 and 1127. The Ivanovsky monastery was first mentioned in 1243. It was founded by Princess Efrosinya, the wife of Prince Yaroslav Vladimirovich of Pskov, who became a nun in the monastery. In 1243, she died and was buried in the cathedral. Later, a number of Pskov princesses also became nuns, and they were buried in the cathedral as well.

In 1615, during the Swedish siege of Pskov, the monastery was occupied by the Swedish army, and the katholikon was severely damaged. The monastery was closed in 1925. The building was subsequently used as a garage, a storage room, and a museum. In 1944, during World War II, there was a fire in the cathedral. In 1949-1959 it was restored. In 1991, the Cathedral of Nativity of Saint John the Baptist was returned to the Russian Orthodox Church, and in 2007, it was transferred to the Krypetsky Monastery.

== Architecture ==
Unlike many other churches in Pskov, the Ivanovsky katholikon is made of limestone, with some additions of plinthite. It has three apses and three domes, and its architecture is close to that of the katholikons in Antoniev Monastery and Yuriev Monastery in Novgorod. Originally, the interior was covered by frescoes, but almost all of the frescoes were lost.

There is a belfry, built in the 16th century and adjoining the southwestern corner of the church.
