= Pauline Janson =

British rower

Personal information
- Nationality: British
- Born: 26 November 1957 (age 68) Blackpool, England

Sport
- Sport: Rowing
- Club: Oxford University WBC; John O'Gaunt RC

Pauline Janson (born 26 November 1957) is a former British rower who competed at the 1980 Summer Olympics.

== Rowing career ==
Janson took up rowing while studying mathematics at St Hilda's College, Oxford and became Captain of Boats before rowing in the 1978 and 1979 women's boat race in 1978 and 1979. After joining the British training squad in 1980 she was selected to represent Great Britain women's coxed four event at the 1980 Olympic Games in Moscow. The team which consisted of Janson, Bridget Buckley, Pauline Hart, Jane Cross and Sue Brown (cox) finished in sixth place.

She was part of the eight, that won the national title rowing for Great Britain senior squad boat, at the 1981 National Championships and rowed in the eight at the 1981 World Rowing Championships in Munich and in the eight at the 1982 World Rowing Championships in Lucerne. She was part of the eight that won the national title, rowing for an A.R.A squad, at the 1982 National Rowing Championships.
