= Sue Brown (rowing) =

English coxswain (born 1958)

Personal information
- Nationality: British
- Born: 29 June 1958 (age 68) Devon

Sport
- Club: Wadham College BC; Oxford University WBC

Susan Brown (born 1958) is an English former cox who competed at the 1980 Summer Olympics and is also notable for being the first woman to compete in the 152-year history of The Boat Race when she coxed the Oxford VIII in the 1981 race.

== Rowing career ==
Brown is from Honiton, Devon and took up rowing while studying biochemistry as an undergraduate at Wadham College, Oxford. in 1979 Dan Topolski recruited Brown for the British squad and in 1980 she coxed the Oxford crew to victory in the women's boat race. She was selected to represent Great Britain in the women's coxed four at the 1980 Summer Olympics in Moscow. The crew which consisted of Brown, Pauline Janson, Bridget Buckley, Pauline Hart and Jane Cross finished in sixth place.

Brown was headline news in 1981, when she was selected as the Oxford cox for the men's boat race. Oxford won the 1981 race by 8 lengths. During 1981, she also coxed the four at the 1981 World Rowing Championships and was both the quads and four that won the national titles, at the 1981 National Championships. Brown also coxed the Oxford VIII in the 1982 race which Oxford won by 3 1/4 lengths.
