= Pskov =

City in Pskov Oblast, Russia

Pskov Псков
- City
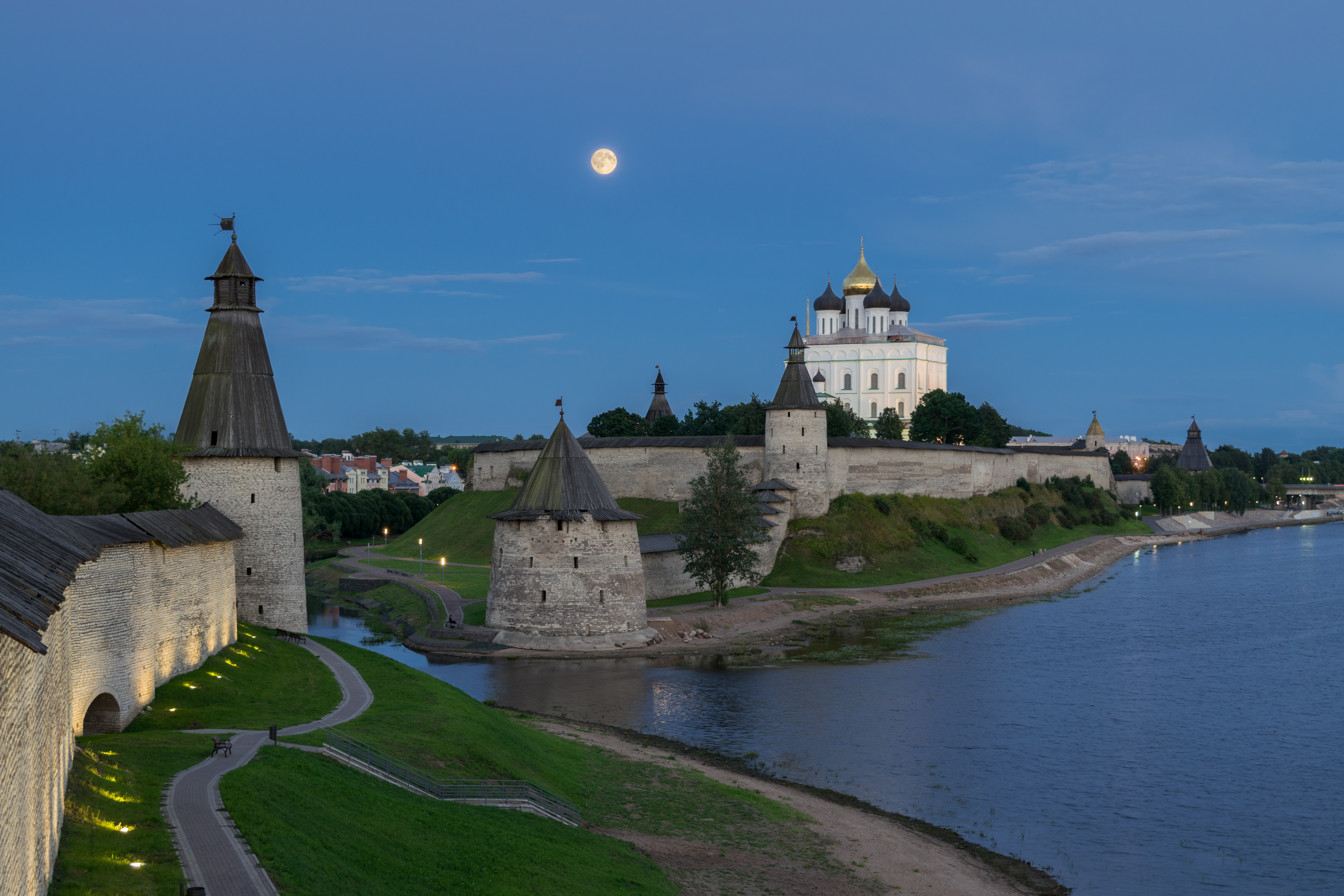
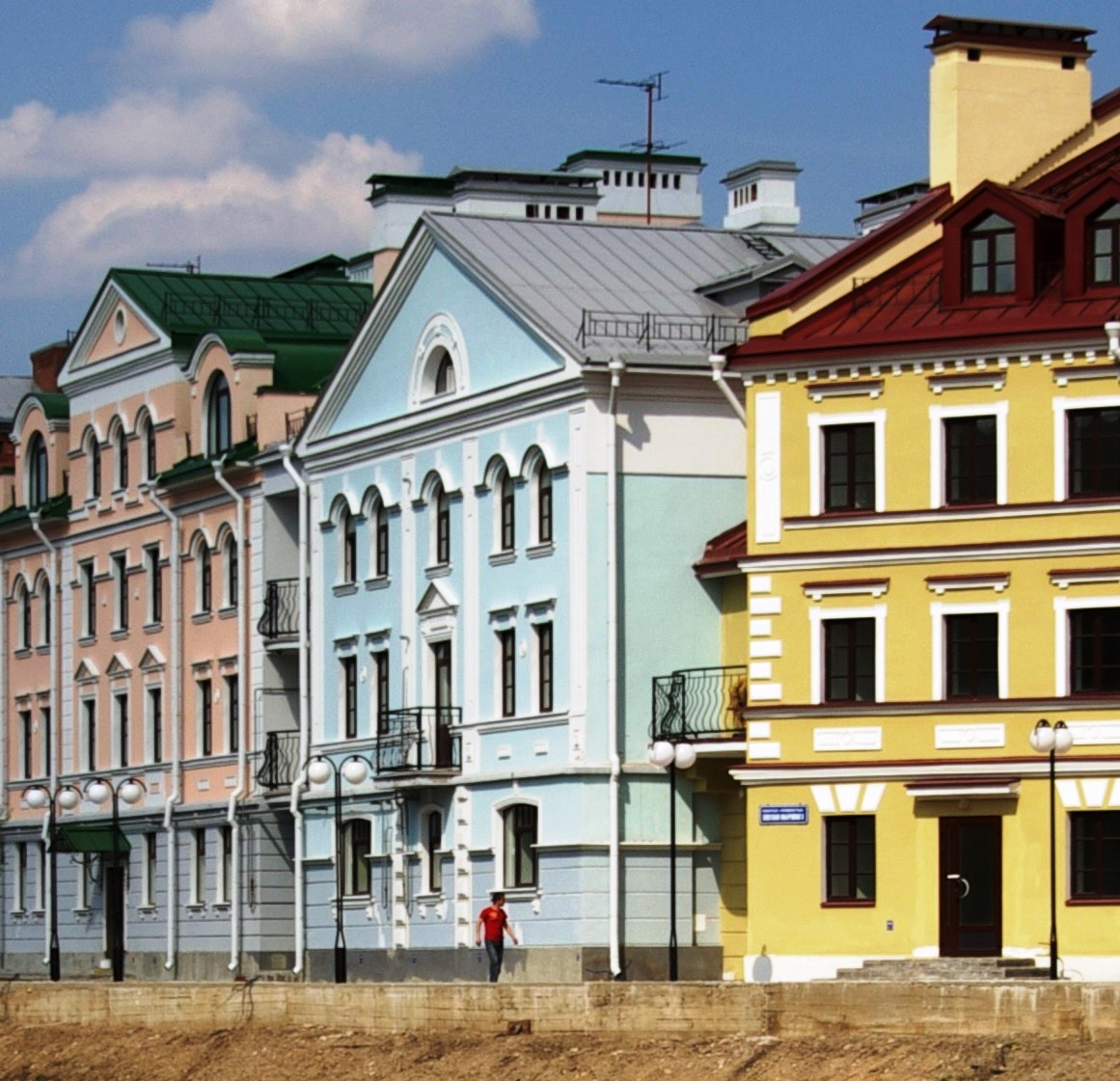
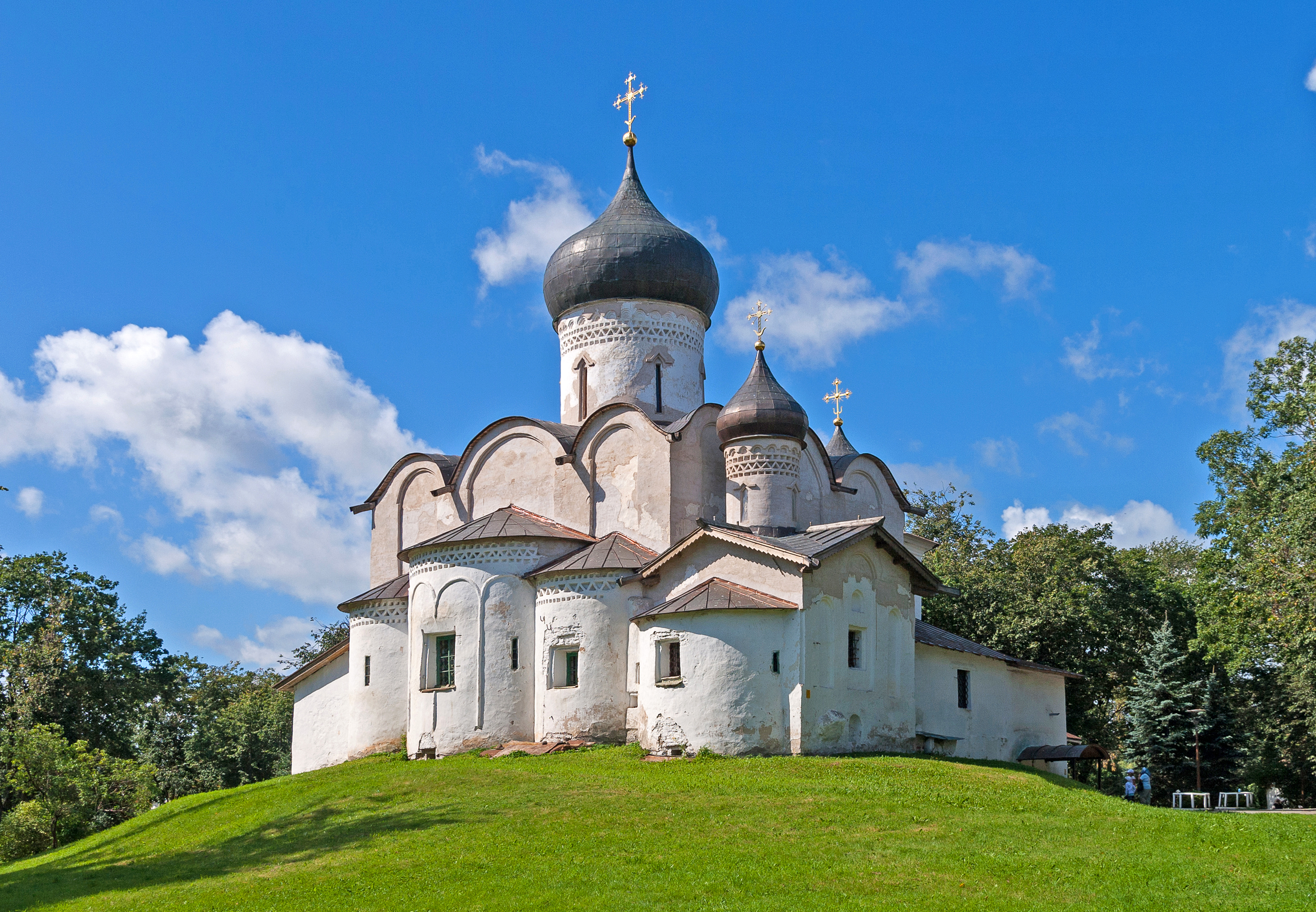
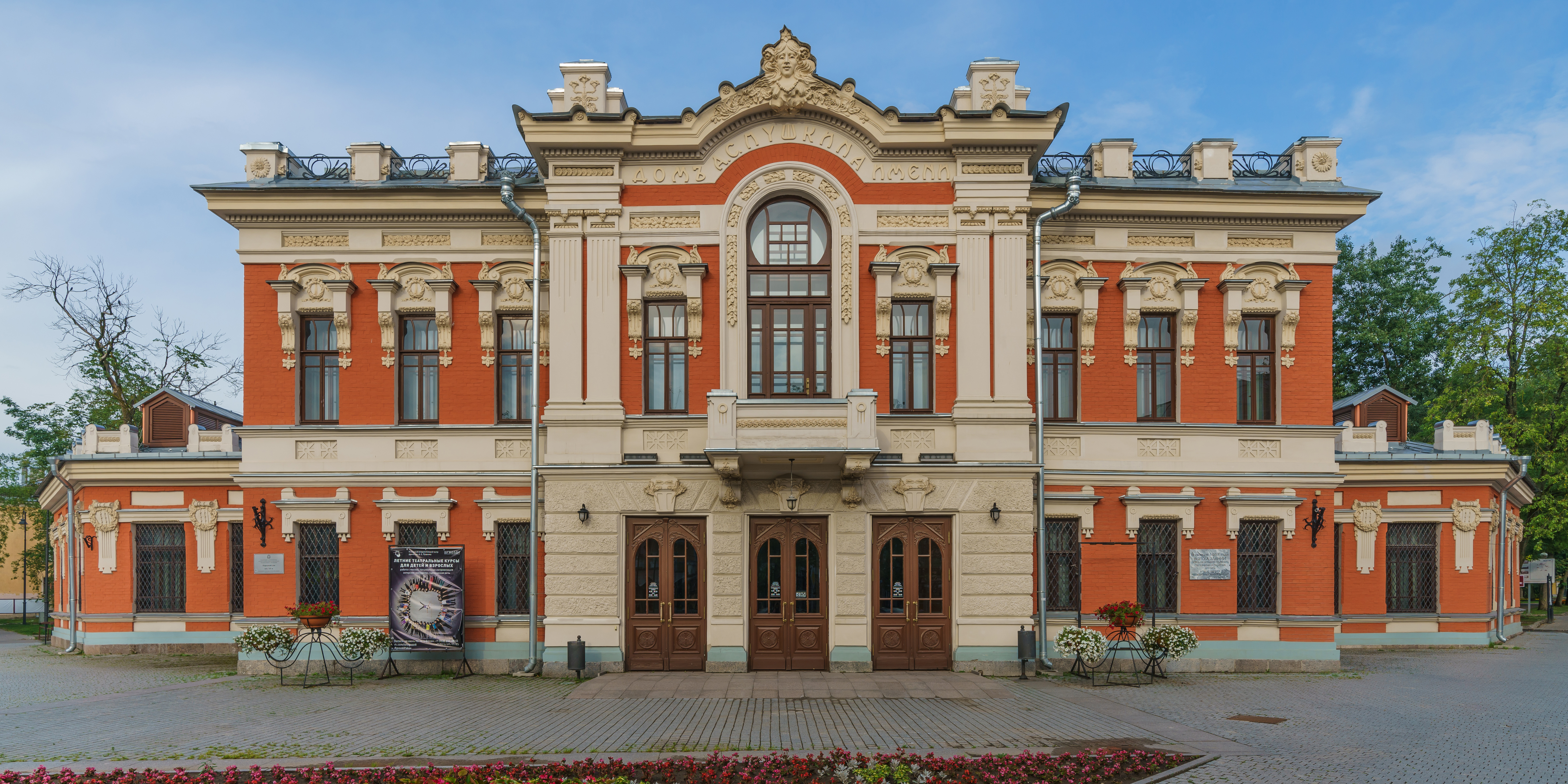
- From the top to bottom-right, Pskov Kremlin, Golden Quay, Church of Saint Basil of Caesarea, Pskov Academic Drama Theatre

- Flag Coat of arms
- Interactive map of Pskov
- Location of Pskov Pskov (European Russia) Pskov (Europe)
- Coordinates: 57°49′N 28°20′E
- Country: Russia
- Federal subject: Pskov Oblast
- First mentioned: 903

Government
  - Body: City Duma
  - Head: Boris Yolkin
- Elevation: 45 m (148 ft)

Population (2010 Census)
  - Total: 203,279
  - Estimate (2025): 185,486 (−8.8%)
  - Rank: 91st in 2010

Administrative status
  - Subordinated to: City of Pskov
  - Capital of: Pskov Oblast, Pskovsky District

Municipal status
  - Urban okrug: Pskov Urban Okrug
  - Capital of: Pskov Urban Okrug, Pskovsky Municipal District
- Time zone: UTC+3 (MSK)
- Postal code: 180xxx
- Dialing code: +7 8112
- OKTMO ID: 58701000001
- City Day: July 23
- Website: www.pskovgorod.ru

Pskov (Russian: Псков, IPA: [ˈpskof]; see also names in other languages) is a city in northwestern Russia and the administrative center of Pskov Oblast, located about 20 kilometers (12 mi) east of the Estonian border, on the Velikaya River. Population: 193,082 (2021 census); 203,279 (2010 census); 202,780 (2002 census); 203,789 (1989 Soviet census).

Pskov is one of the oldest cities in Russia. During the Middle Ages, it served as the capital of the Pskov Republic and was a trading post of the Hanseatic League before it was incorporated into the Grand Duchy of Moscow and became an important border fortress in the Tsardom of Russia.

== History ==
=== Early history ===
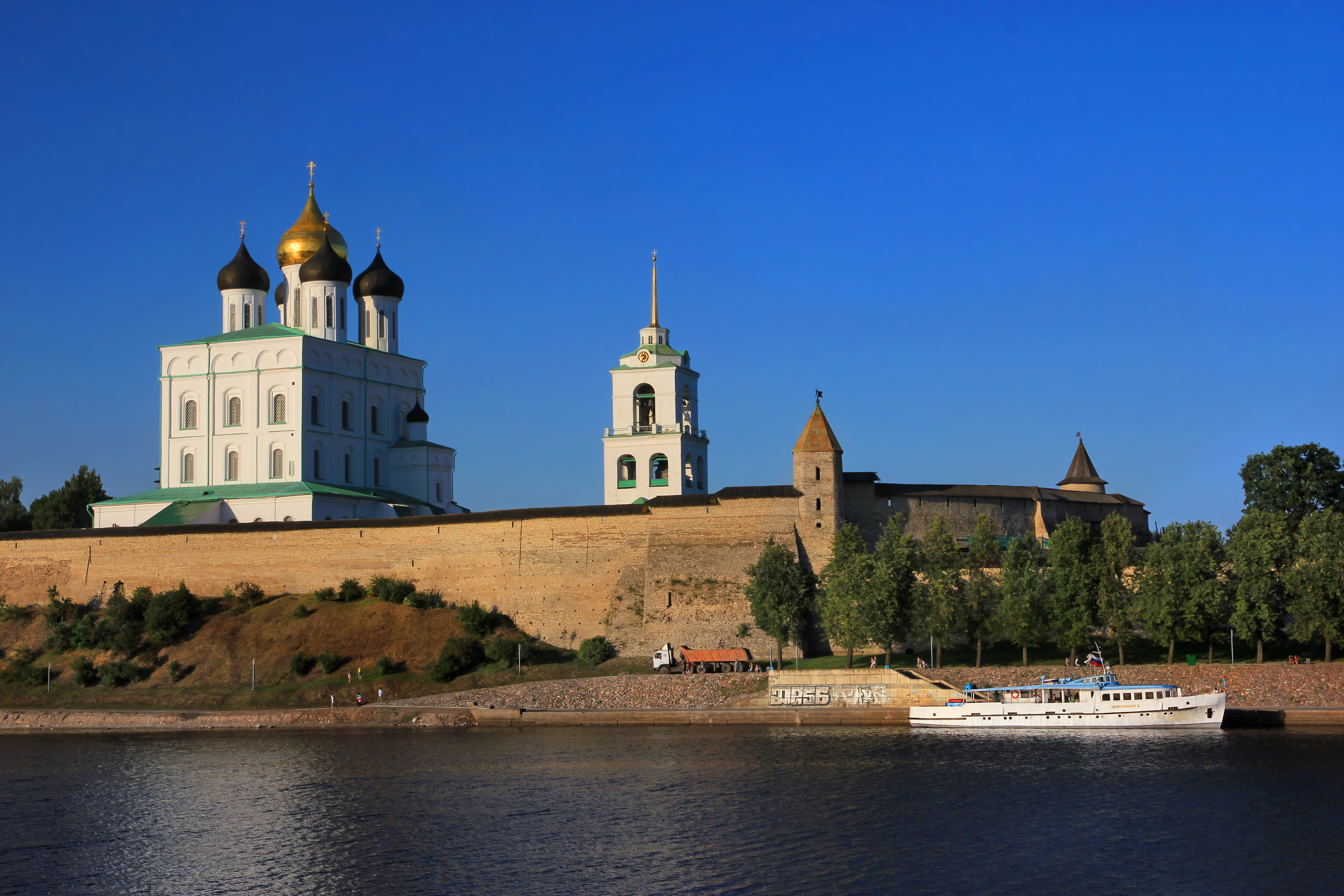
View of the Pskov Kremlin from the Velikaya River in 2014

Pskov is one of the oldest cities in Russia. The name of the city, originally Pleskov (historic Russian spelling Плѣсковъ, Plěskov), may be loosely translated as "[the town] of purling waters". It was historically known in English as Plescow.

Its earliest mention comes in 903, which records that Igor of Kiev married a local lady, Olga (later Saint Olga of Kiev). Pskovians sometimes take this year as the city's foundation date, and in 2003 a great jubilee took place to celebrate Pskov's 1,100th anniversary.

The first prince of Pskov was Vladimir the Great's youngest son Sudislav. Once imprisoned by his brother Yaroslav, he was not released until the latter's death several decades later. In the 12th and 13th centuries, the town adhered politically to the Novgorod Republic. In 1241, it was taken by the Teutonic Knights, but Alexander Nevsky recaptured it several months later during a legendary campaign dramatized in Sergei Eisenstein's 1938 movie Alexander Nevsky.

In order to secure their independence from the knights, the Pskovians elected a Lithuanian prince, named Daumantas, a Roman Catholic converted to Orthodox faith and known in Russia as Dovmont, as their military leader and prince in 1266. Having fortified the town, Daumantas routed the Teutonic Knights at Rakvere and overran much of Estonia. His remains and sword are preserved in the local kremlin, and the core of the citadel, erected by him, still bears the name of "Dovmont's town".

In 1341 the city recognized overlordship of the Grand Duchy of Lithuania, in 1347 it switched allegiance to the Novgorod Republic, and the following year it became the capital of the newly independent Pskov Republic.

=== Pskov Republic ===
By the 14th century, the town functioned as the capital of a de facto sovereign republic. Its most powerful force was the merchants who traded with the Hanseatic League. Pskov's independence was formally recognized by Novgorod in 1348. Several years later, the veche promulgated a law code (called the Pskov Charter), which was one of the principal sources of the all-Russian law code issued in 1497.

Already in the 13th century German merchants were present in Zapskovye area of Pskov and the Hanseatic League had a trading post in the same area in the first half of 16th century which moved to Zavelichye after a fire in 1562. The wars with Livonian Order, Poland-Lithuania and Sweden interrupted the trade but it was maintained until the 17th century, with Swedish merchants gaining the upper hand eventually.

Historical population
Year	Pop.	±%
1882	21,170	—
1897	30,388	+43.5%
1989	203,789	+570.6%
2002	202,780	−0.5%
2010	203,279	+0.2%
2021	193,082	−5.0%

The importance of the city made it the subject of numerous sieges throughout its history. The Pskov Krom (or Kremlin) withstood twenty-six sieges in the 15th century alone. At one point, five stone walls ringed it, making the city practically impregnable. A local school of icon-painting flourished, and the local masons were considered the best in Russia. Many peculiar features of Russian architecture were first introduced in Pskov.

=== Grand Duchy of Moscow ===
Finally, in 1510, the city was annexed by the Grand Duchy of Moscow. Three hundred families were deported from Pskov to central Russia, and merchants and military families from Muscovy were settled in the city. At this time Pskov had at least 6,500 households and a population of more than 30,000; it was one of the three biggest cities of Muscovy, alongside Moscow and Novgorod.

=== Tsardom of Russia ===
Coat of arms of Pskov in 1711

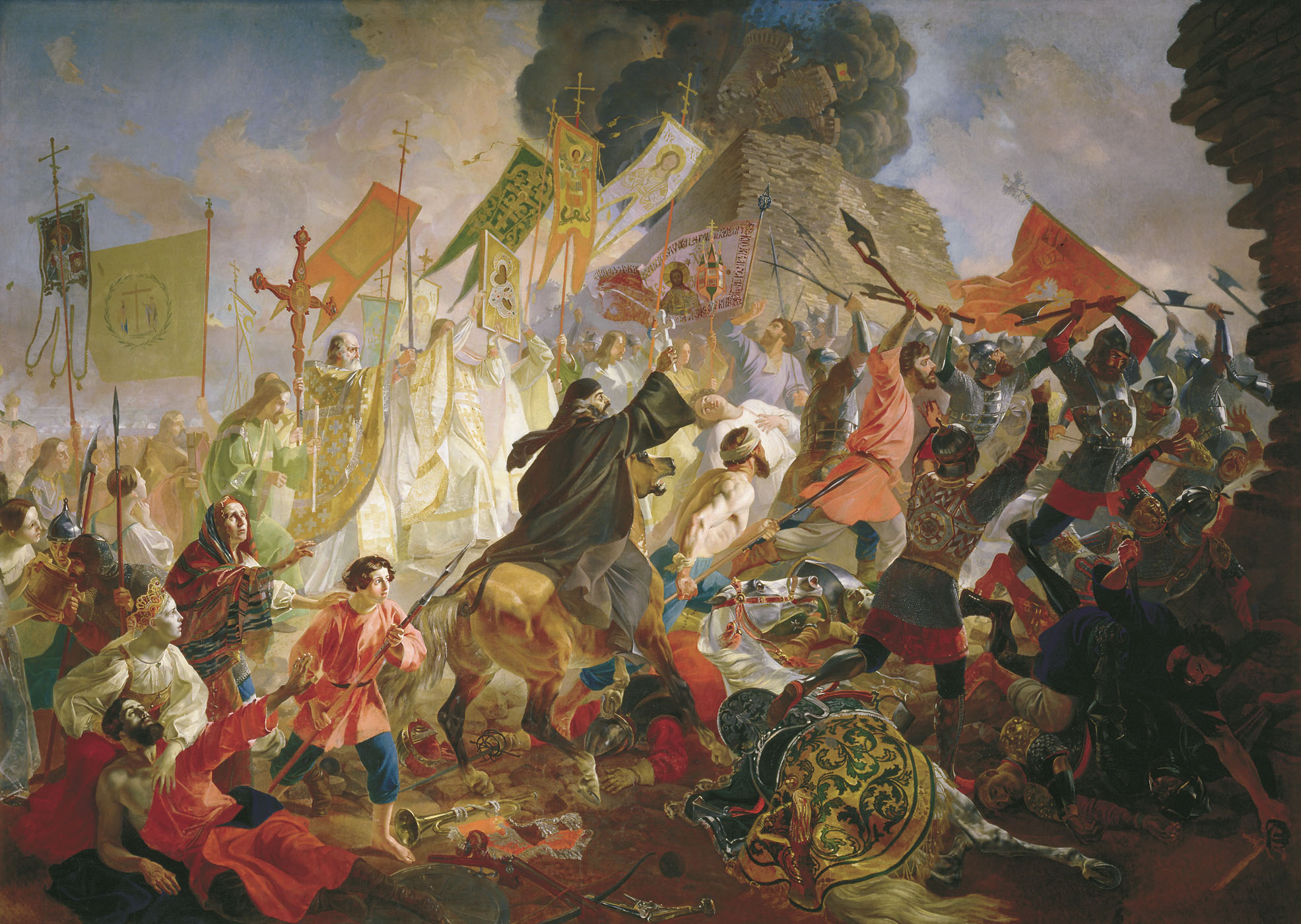
Siege of Pskov by Stephen Báthory, by Karl Bryullov.

The deportation of noble families to Moscow under Ivan IV in 1570 is a subject of Rimsky-Korsakov's opera Pskovityanka (1872). Pskov still attracted enemy armies and it withstood a prolonged siege by a 50,000-strong Polish-Lithuanian army during the final stage of the Livonian War (1581–1582). The king of Poland Stephen Báthory undertook some thirty-one attacks to storm the city, which was defended mainly by civilians. Even after one of the city walls was broken, the Pskovians managed to fill the gap and repel the attack. "A big city, it is like Paris", wrote Báthory's secretary about Pskov.

The estimates of the population of Pskov land in the middle of 16th century range from 150 to 300 thousand. Famines, epidemics (especially the epidemic of 1552) and the warfare led to a five-fold decrease of the population by 1582–1585 due to mortality and migration.

The city withstood a siege by the Swedish in 1615. The successful defence of the city led to the peace negotiations culminating in the Treaty of Stolbovo.

=== Russian Empire ===
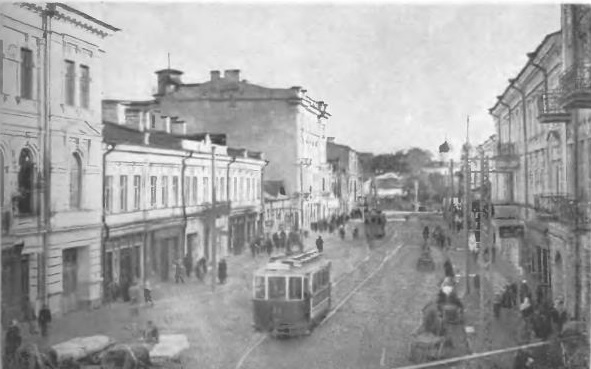
Pskov in 1895

Peter the Great's conquest of Estonia and Livonia during the Great Northern War in the early 18th century spelled the end of Pskov's traditional role as a vital border fortress and a key to Russia's interior. As a consequence, the city's importance and well-being declined dramatically, although it served as a seat of separate Pskov Governorate since 1777. In 1897, the ethnic make-up, by mother tongue, was 80.0% Russian, 5.7% Polish, 4.7% Jewish, 4.3% German, 2.4% Latvian, 2.1% Estonian.

During World War I, Pskov became the headquarters for Russia's Northern Front, commanded by Nikolai Ruzsky. On 15 March 1917, aboard the Imperial train, Tsar Nicholas II abdicated here. After the Russo-German Brest-Litovsk Peace Conference (22 December 1917 – 3 March 1918), the Imperial German Army invaded the area.

Pskov was also occupied by the Estonian army between 25 May 1919 and 28 August 1919 during the Estonian War of Independence when the White Russian commander Stanisław Bułak-Bałachowicz became the military administrator of Pskov. He personally ceded most of his responsibilities to a democratically elected municipal duma and focused on both cultural and economical recovery of the war-impoverished city. He also put an end to censorship of press and allowed for creation of several socialist associations and newspapers.

=== Recent history ===
Under the Soviet government, large parts of the city were rebuilt, many ancient buildings, particularly churches, were demolished to give space for new constructions. During World War II, in June 1940, the Soviet 8th Army invaded Estonia and Latvia from the city. The medieval citadel provided little protection against modern artillery of the Wehrmacht, and Pskov suffered substantial damage during the German occupation from 9 July 1941 until 23 July 1944. The Germans operated a forced labour camp for Jewish men and women. In February 1944, thousands of people were killed during Russian bombings of the city. A huge portion of the population died during the war, and Pskov has since struggled to regain its traditional position as a major industrial and cultural center of western Russia.

== Administrative and municipal status ==
Pskov is the administrative center of the oblast and, within the framework of administrative divisions, it also serves as the administrative center of Pskovsky District, even though it is not a part of it. As an administrative division, it is incorporated separately as the City of Pskov—an administrative unit with the status equal to that of the districts. As a municipal division, the City of Pskov is incorporated as Pskov Urban Okrug.

== Landmarks and sights ==
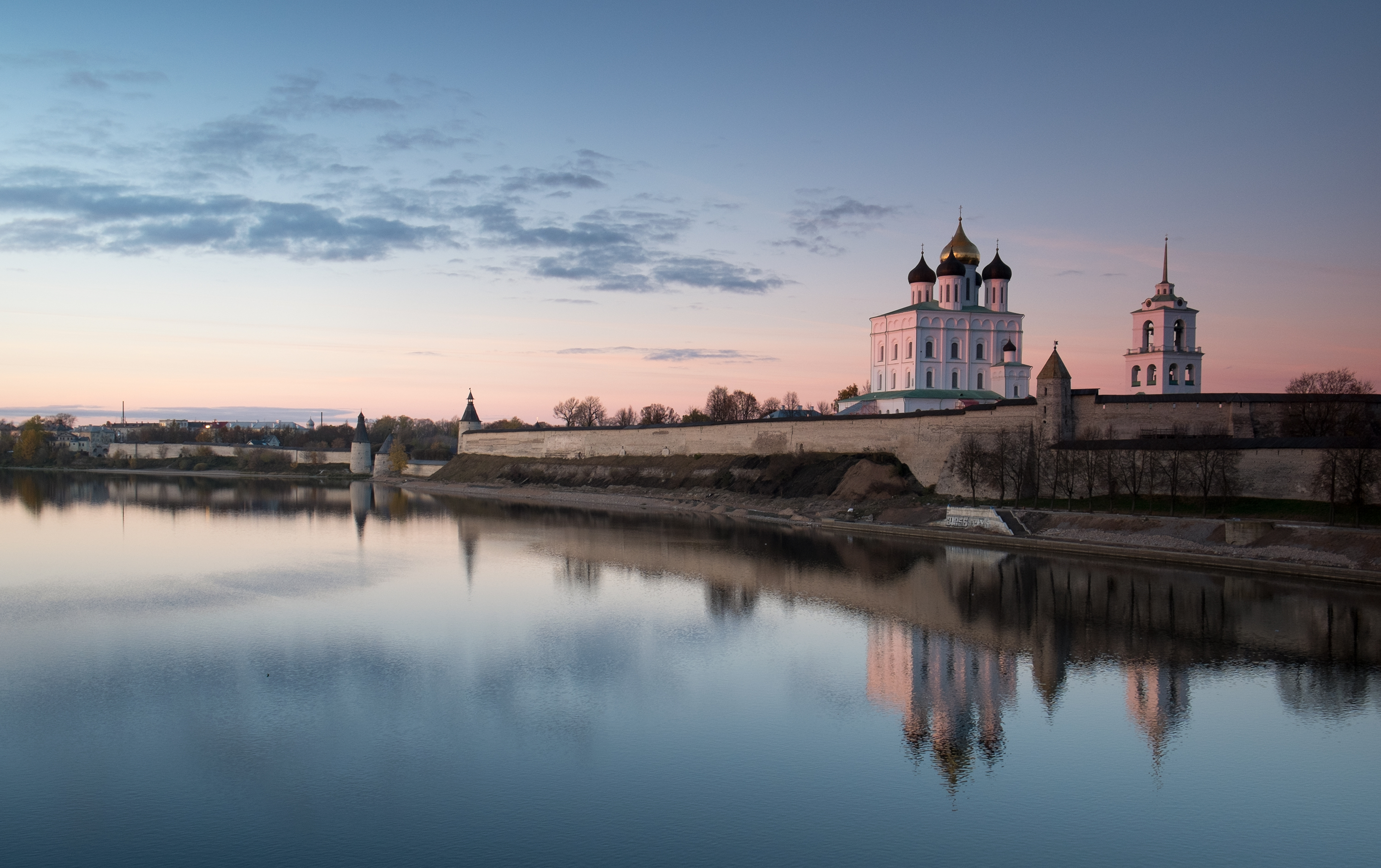
Pskov Krom, view from the Velikaya River

Pskov still preserves much of its medieval walls, built from the 13th century on. Its medieval citadel is called either the Krom or the Kremlin. Within its walls rises the 256-foot-tall (78 m) Trinity Cathedral, founded in 1138 and rebuilt in the 1690s. The cathedral contains the tombs of saint princes Vsevolod (died in 1138) and Dovmont (died in 1299). Other ancient cathedrals adorn the Mirozhsky Monastery (completed by 1152), famous for its 12th-century frescoes, St. John's (completed by 1243), and the Snetogorsky monastery (built in 1310 and stucco-painted in 1313).

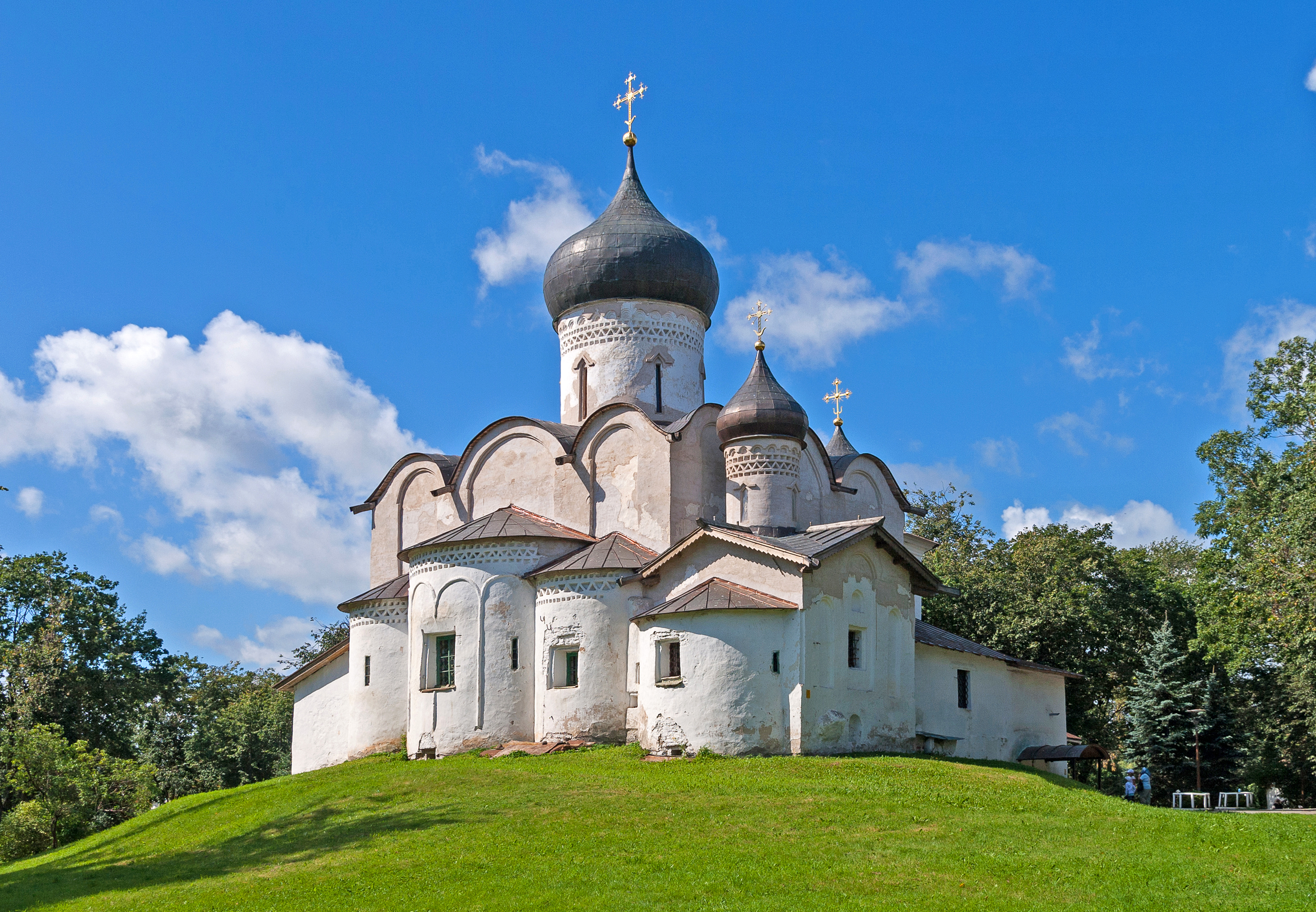
Church of Saint Basil of Caesarea on the Hill

Pskov has many churches, dating mainly from the 15th and the 16th centuries. There are many dozens of them, the most notable being St. Basil's on the Hill (1413), St. Kozma and Demian's near the Bridge (1463), St. George's from the Downhill (1494), Assumption from the Ferryside (1444, 1521), and St. Nicholas' from Usokha (1536). The 17th-century residential architecture is represented by merchant mansions, such as the Salt House, the Pogankin Palace, and the Trubinsky mansion.

Among the sights in the vicinity of Pskov are Izborsk, a seat of Rurik's brother in the 9th century; the Pskov Monastery of the Caves, the oldest continually functioning monastery in Russia (founded in the mid-15th century) and a magnet for pilgrims from all over the country; the 16th-century Krypetsky Monastery; Yelizarov Convent, which used to be a great cultural and literary center of medieval Russia; and Mikhaylovskoye, a family home of Alexander Pushkin where he wrote some of the best known lines in the Russian language. The national poet of Russia is buried in the ancient cloister at the Holy Mountains nearby. Unfortunately, the area presently has only a minimal tourist infrastructure, and the historic core of Pskov requires serious investments to realize its great tourist potential.

On 7 July 2019, the Churches of the Pskov School of Architecture was inscribed as a UNESCO World Heritage Site.

== Geography ==
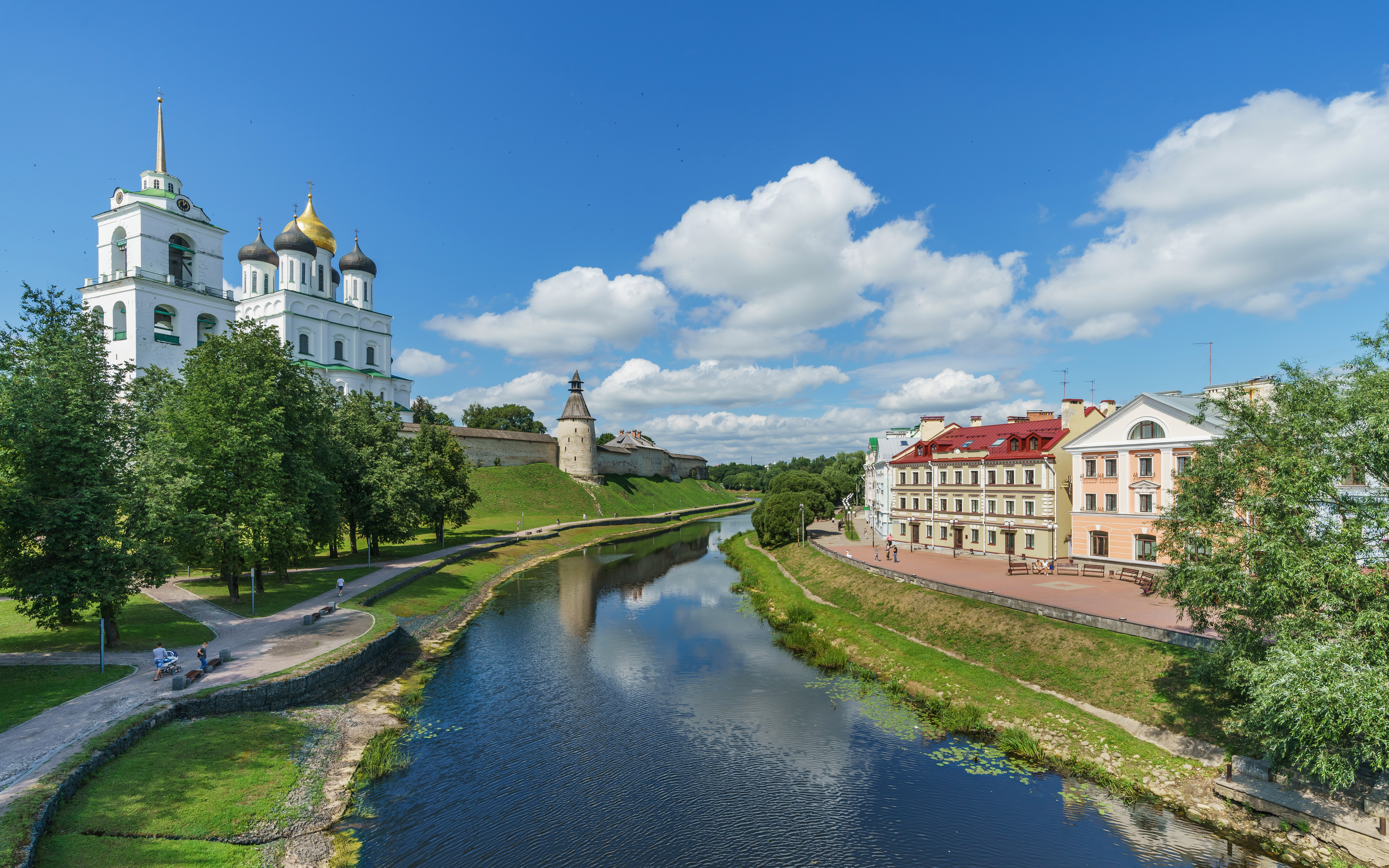
Pskova river in Pskov

=== Ecological situation ===
Vehicle emissions reach 83% of total emissions from stationary and mobile sources. The volume of emissions of atmospheric pollutants from stationary sources in 2007 amounted to 16,500 tons, including 7,100 tons (43.2%) of carbon monoxide and 2,600 tons (15.8%) of solids. The largest source of air pollution in Pskov is Pskov Poultry Farm LLC (1,365.92 tons of pollutants were emitted) and the Pskov Heating Networks SE (478.12 tons). All rivers flowing through the territory of the Pskov Oblast, including the city of Pskov, are characterized by increased concentrations of total iron, copper ions, and hardly oxidizable organic compounds in the water.

The following indicators characterize air pollution in Pskov:

- annual average and maximum one-time concentration of sulfur dioxide – below 1 MPC
- the annual average concentration of nitrogen dioxide – 1.5 MPC; the maximum single concentration – 3.4 MPC
- annual average and maximum one-time concentration of carbon monoxide – below 1 MPC
- average annual concentration of suspended solids – below 1 MPC; the maximum single concentration – 2.2 MPC
- the degree of air pollution in general for Pskov is approximately low and is determined by the API value – 2.81

Since the late 1990s, the Clean Water project officially registered by United Russia in 2006 has been implemented. Improving the quality of drinking water is planned to be carried out by gradually abandoning surface water intake from the Velikaya River and transitioning to the extraction of water from underground sources. However, underground water intake leads to the clogging of hot water supply systems (up to complete obstruction) in those facilities where this water enters due to its increased hardness.

=== Climate ===
The climate of Pskov is humid continental (Köppen climate classification Dfb) with maritime influences due to the city's relative proximity to the Baltic Sea and Gulf of Finland. Compared to the climate of Central Russia, the city's climate is slightly less continental with cold winters and warm summers. Summer and fall have more precipitation than winter and spring.

Climate data for Pskov (1991-2020, extremes 1874–present)
Month	Jan	Feb	Mar	Apr	May	Jun	Jul	Aug	Sep	Oct	Nov	Dec	Year
Record high °C (°F)	9.8 (49.6)	11.3 (52.3)	19.3 (66.7)	28.3 (82.9)	32.0 (89.6)	35.3 (95.5)	35.7 (96.3)	35.6 (96.1)	30.3 (86.5)	22.6 (72.7)	14.1 (57.4)	12.4 (54.3)	35.6 (96.1)
Mean daily maximum °C (°F)	−2.3 (27.9)	−1.8 (28.8)	3.4 (38.1)	11.7 (53.1)	18.1 (64.6)	21.7 (71.1)	24.1 (75.4)	22.5 (72.5)	16.7 (62.1)	9.2 (48.6)	2.9 (37.2)	−0.6 (30.9)	10.5 (50.9)
Daily mean °C (°F)	−4.7 (23.5)	−5.0 (23.0)	−0.7 (30.7)	6.3 (43.3)	12.2 (54.0)	16.2 (61.2)	18.6 (65.5)	16.9 (62.4)	11.7 (53.1)	5.8 (42.4)	0.8 (33.4)	−2.6 (27.3)	6.3 (43.3)
Mean daily minimum °C (°F)	−7.4 (18.7)	−8.2 (17.2)	−4.5 (23.9)	1.3 (34.3)	6.3 (43.3)	10.6 (51.1)	13.1 (55.6)	11.6 (52.9)	7.3 (45.1)	2.6 (36.7)	−1.4 (29.5)	−4.9 (23.2)	2.2 (36.0)
Record low °C (°F)	−40.6 (−41.1)	−37.6 (−35.7)	−29.7 (−21.5)	−20.9 (−5.6)	−5.9 (21.4)	−0.1 (31.8)	2.7 (36.9)	1.3 (34.3)	−4.6 (23.7)	−12.5 (9.5)	−23.8 (−10.8)	−40.3 (−40.5)	−40.6 (−41.1)
Average precipitation mm (inches)	48 (1.9)	37 (1.5)	36 (1.4)	39 (1.5)	58 (2.3)	85 (3.3)	71 (2.8)	85 (3.3)	63 (2.5)	65 (2.6)	55 (2.2)	45 (1.8)	687 (27.1)
Average rainy days	9	7	9	12	15	18	16	16	17	18	14	10	161
Average snowy days	22	20	14	5	1	0.03	0	0	0.03	3	13	20	98
Average relative humidity (%)	87	84	80	70	67	72	74	78	83	86	88	89	80
Mean monthly sunshine hours	41	71	136	189	279	300	285	233	152	90	34	25	1,835
Source 1: Pogoda.ru.net
Source 2: NOAA (sun 1961–1990)

== Economy ==
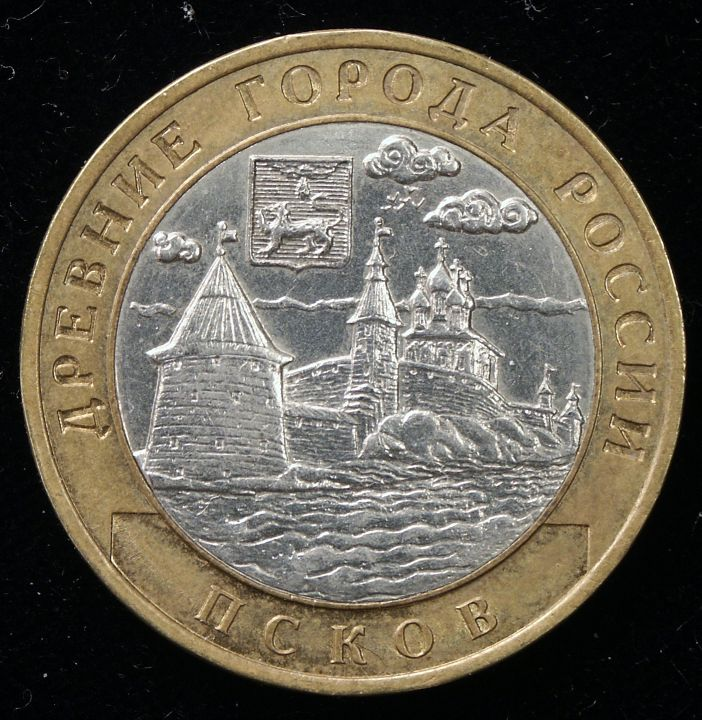
A Russian coin commemorating Pskov's 1,100th anniversary

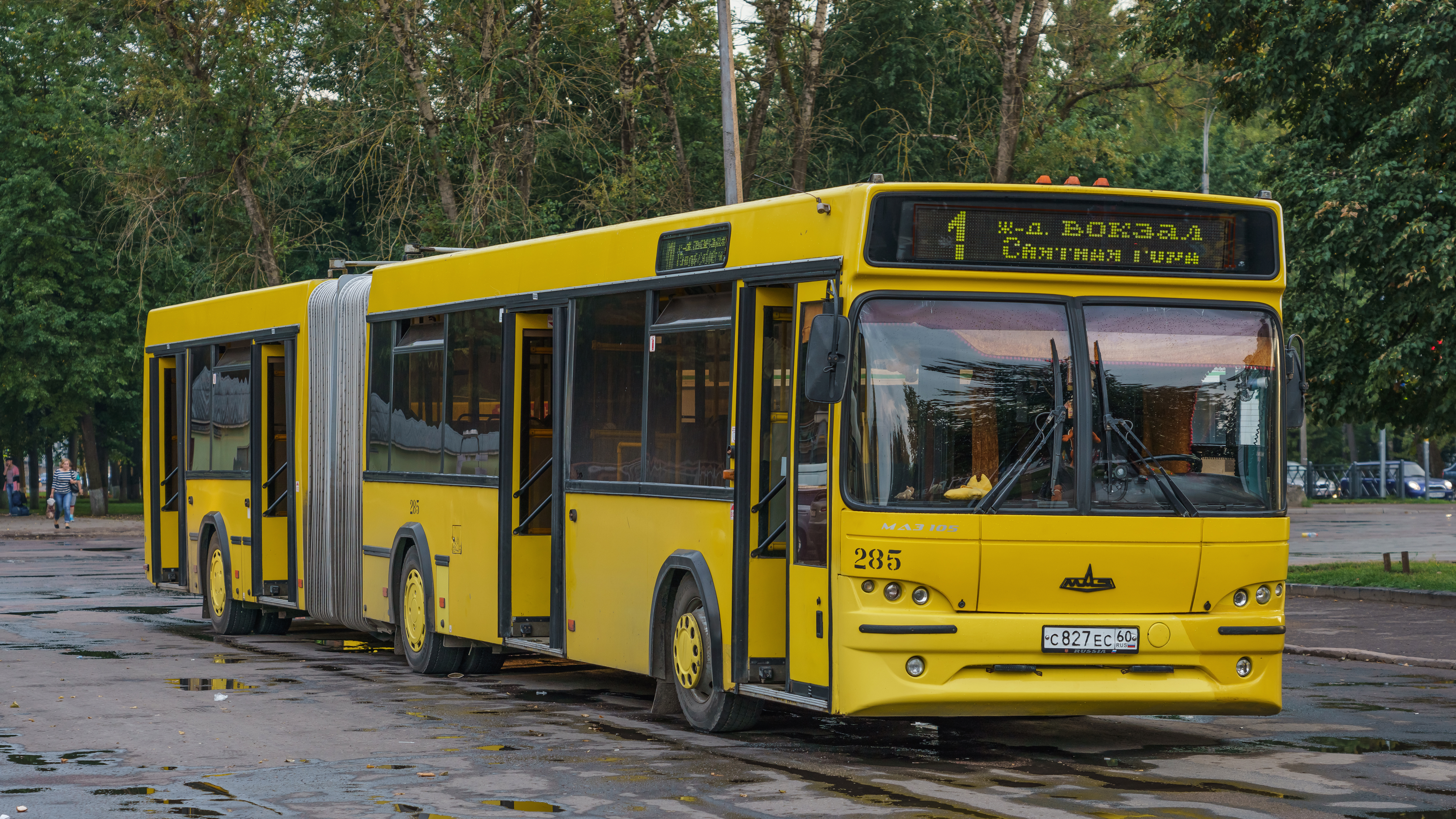
City bus in Pskov

- JSC "AVAR" (AvtoElectroArmatura). Electric equipment production for cars, lorries buses and tractors (relays, switches, fuses, electronic articles)
- Pskov is served by Pskov Airport which is also used for military aviation.

== Notable people ==
- Valery Alekseyev (born 1979), professional association football player
- Alexander Bastrykin (born 1953), Head of The Investigative Committee of Russia
- Irina Podnosova (1953–2025), Chief Justice of Russia
- Valentin Chernykh (1935–2012), screenwriter
- Semyon Dimanstein (1886–1938), Soviet state activist, killed in Stalin's purges, a representative of the Soviet Jews
- Oxana Fedorova (born 1977), Miss Russia 2001, Miss Universe 2002 (dethroned)
- Mikhail Golitsyn (1639–1687), statesman, governor of Pskov
- Eugeniusz Grodziński (1912–1994), Polish philosopher
- Veniamin Kaverin (1902–1989), writer
- Yakov Knyazhnin (1740–1791), dramatist and playwright
- Vasily Kuptsov (1899–1935), painter
- Oleg Lavrentiev (1926–2011), Soviet, Russian and Ukrainian physicist
- Kronid Lyubarsky (1934–1996), journalist, dissident, human rights activist
- Boris Meissner (1915–2003), German lawyer and social scientist
- Mikhail Minin (1922–2008), First soldier to hoist the Soviet flag atop the Reichstag building during the Battle of Berlin
- Elena Neklyudova (born 1973), singer-songwriter
- Afanasy Ordin-Nashchokin (1605–1680), Russian statesman of the 17th century.
- Yulia Peresild (born 1984), stage and film actress

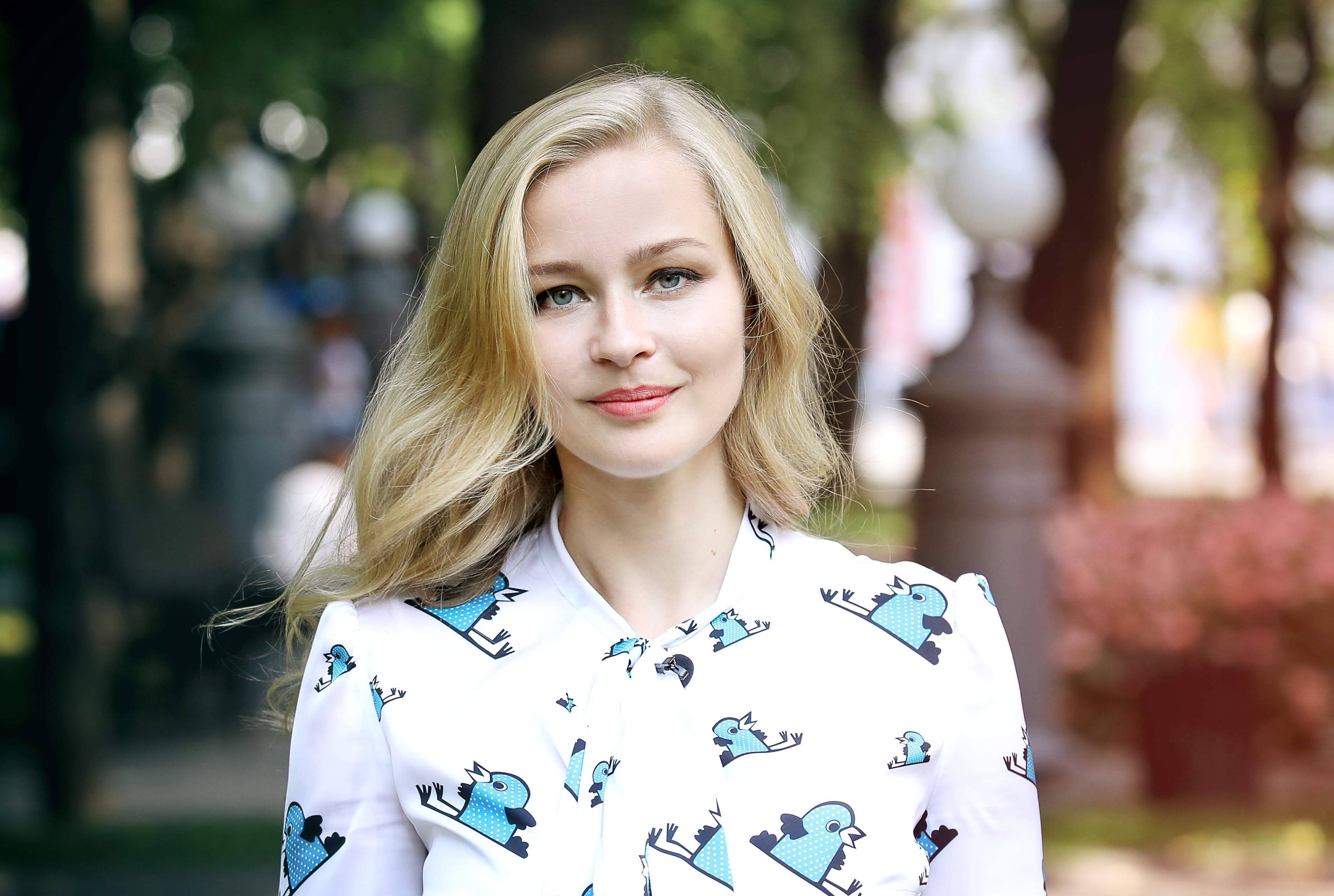
Russian actress Yulia Peresild

- Georg von Rauch (1904–1991), historian
- Nikolai Skrydlov (1844–1918), admiral in the Imperial Russian Navy
- Vladimir Smirnov (born 1957), Russian businessman
- Grigory Teplov (1717–1779), academic administrator
- Aleksander von der Bellen (1859–1924), politician, provincial commissar of Pskov
- Maxim Vorobiev (1787–1855), landscape painter
- Ferdinand von Wrangel (1797–1870), explorer and seaman
- Vsevolod of Pskov, Novgorodian prince, canonized by the Russian Orthodox Church as Vsevolod-Gavriil
- Aleksandr Vasiliev (born 1982), politician

=== Sport ===
- Nina Cheremisina (born 1946), former rower
- Mariya Fadeyeva (born 1958), former rower
- Sergei Fedorov (born 1969), hockey player
- Sergey Matveyev (born 1972), Olympic rower
- Igor Nedorezov (born 1981), professional footballer
- Alexander Nikolaev (born 1990), sprint canoer
- Svetlana Semyonova (born 1958), former rower
- Konstantin Shabanov (born 1989), track and field athlete
- Aleksei Snigiryov (born 1968), professional footballer
- Galina Sovetnikova (born 1955), former rower
- Marina Studneva (born 1959), former rower
- Ruslan Surodin (born 1982), professional footballer
- Valeri Tsvetkov (born 1977), professional footballer
- Vladimir Vagin (born 1982), professional footballer
- Nikita Vasilyev (born 1992), professional football player
- Sergei Vinogradov (born 1981), professional football player

== Twin towns – sister cities ==
Pskov is twinned with:

- Arles, France
- Białystok, Poland
- Daugavpils, Latvia
- Gera, Germany
- Kuopio, Finland
- Neuss, Germany
- Nijmegen, Netherlands
- Norrtälje, Sweden
- Perth, Scotland, United Kingdom
- Rēzekne, Latvia
- Roanoke, Virginia, United States
- Tartu, Estonia
- Valmiera, Latvia
- Vitebsk, Belarus

In February 2023, Roanoke, in the United States, announced it was officially pausing its sister city affiliation with Pskov due to the continuing Russian invasion of Ukraine.
