= Vladimir Vagin =

Vladimir Vagin may refer to:

- Vladimir Vagin (illustrator) (born 1937), Russian illustrator, American from 1990
- Vladimir Vagin (footballer) (born 1982), Russian footballer
