= Jane Cross =

British rower

Personal information
- Nationality: British
- Born: 25 August 1961 (age 64); Old Windsor, Berkshire

Sport
- Sport: Rowing
- Club: Weybridge Ladies ARC

Jane Mary Cross (born 25 August 1961) is a former British rower who competed at the 1980 Summer Olympics.

== Rowing career ==
Cross first became interested in rowing at a young age when she was part of the Wraysbury Skiff and Punting Club, which led to joining the Weybridge Ladies ARC in 1977. In 1979 she competed in the FISA Youth Championships before joining the British senior squad the same year.

In 1980 she was selected to represent Great Britain in the women's coxed four event at the 1980 Olympics in Moscow. The crew which consisted of Cross, Pauline Janson, Bridget Buckley, Pauline Hart and Sue Brown (cox) finished in sixth place.

She was part of the quadruple sculls which won the national title, rowing for a Kingston and Thames composite, with Caroline Casey, Sarah Hunter-Jones, Bernadette Carroll and Sue Brown (cox), at the 1981 National Championships and was part of the eight that won the national title, rowing for an A.R.A Composite, at the 1982 National Rowing Championships.
