= Neklyudov =

Neklyudov (masculine), Neklyudova (feminine) (sometimes Nekljudov) is a Russian surname of noble Russian Neklyudov family. Notable people with the surname include:

- Anatoly Neklyudov, (1856–1943) - Russian diplomat and author
- Elena Neklyudova, Russian singer-songwriter
- Sergey Neklyudov, Russian folklorist and orientalist
