= Aldești =

Aldeşti may refer to several villages in Romania:

- Aldeşti, a village in Bârsa Commune, Arad County
- Aldeşti, a village in Berești-Meria Commune, Galaţi County
- Aldeşti, a village in Golești, Vâlcea
