= Van der Bellen family =

Russian noble family of Dutch descent

Van der Bellen
- Country: Russian Empire
- Current region: Germany, Austria
- Earlier spellings: van der Bellen von der Bellen von-der-Bellen
- Origin: Dutch Republic
- Founder: Johann Abraham van der Bellen
- Connected members: Aleksander von der Bellen; Alexander Van der Bellen

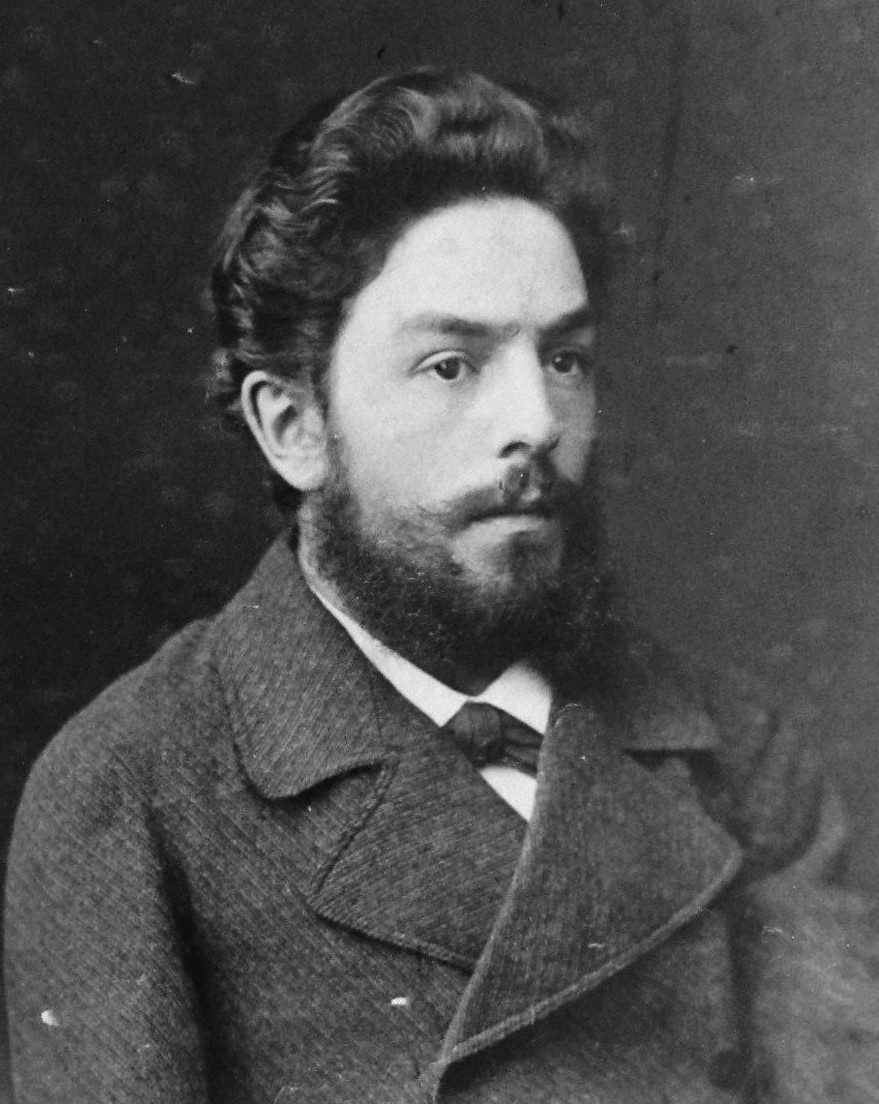
Aleksander von der Bellen, a Russian liberal politician in Imperial Russia

The Van der Bellen family (also spelled von der Bellen or van der Bellen, Russian: ван дер Беллен, [vɐn dʲɪr ˈbɛlʲɪn], originally Russian: фон дер Беллен, [fɐn dʲɪr ˈbɛlʲɪn],) is a Russian noble family of Dutch patrilineal descent. By intermarriage and cultural assimilation it became part of the Russian-German population in the Russian Empire. Its most famous member is Alexander Van der Bellen, the president of Austria. Family members held high offices in the regional government of the Pskov area in Imperial Russia and the family was recognised as noble by Russian authorities in the early 19th century. After the Russian Revolution, family members fled to Estonia and, following the 1940 Soviet invasion and occupation of Estonia, to Germany, The Netherlands and Austria.

== History ==
The family is descended from Johann Abraham van der Bellen, who moved to the Russian Empire around 1763. According to Russian official records, he was born in the Netherlands. In 1787, he volunteered for service with the Military Hospital in Moscow. Around 1793 he moved to Pskov, and became a military doctor. He was involved in the construction of the local hospital and refused to receive any pay for his work. During the 1806–1807 War of the Fourth Coalition, he took responsibility for the care of French prisoners of war and bought medical equipment and housing for them with his own resources. In 1801 he married the German-Russian noblewoman Elisabeth von Römer in Pskov. In the early 19th century the family was recognised as noble in the Russian Empire via Johann Abraham being made a knight of the Order of Saint Vladimir.

Aleksander von der Bellen, a liberal politician, became head of the Pskov government before the Russian Revolution. After the revolution, he and his sons fled to Estonia. He was the grandfather of the Austrian President and former Green Party leader Alexander Van der Bellen. Alexander Van der Bellen discusses the history of his family in his book Die Kunst der Freiheit.

During the 19th and early 20th century, the family name was spelled von der Bellen or von-der-Bellen.
