= Svetlana Semyonova =

Russian rower

Personal information
- Born: 11 May 1958 (age 68) Pskov, Russia
- Height: 179 cm (5 ft 10 in)
- Weight: 76 kg (168 lb)

Sport
- Sport: Rowing
Medal record
Women's rowing
Representing the Soviet Union
Bronze medal – third place	1980 Moscow	Coxed four
World Championships
Gold medal – first place	1979 Bled	Coxed four
Gold medal – first place	1981 Munich	Coxed four
Gold medal – first place	1982 Lucerne	Coxed four
Bronze medal – third place	1983 Duisburg	Coxed four

Svetlana Stepanovna Semyonova (Russian: Светла́на Степа́новна Семёнова; born 11 May 1958) is a Russian former rower who competed in the 1980 Summer Olympics.
