= Silvia Fröhlich =

German rower

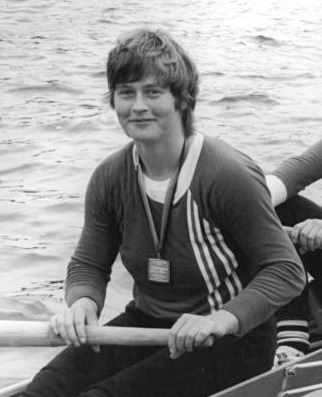
- Fröhlich in 1984

Personal information
- Born: Silvia Arndt; 24 February 1959 (age 67) Leipzig, Bezirk Leipzig, East Germany
- Height: 1.82 m (6 ft 0 in)
- Weight: 74 kg (163 lb)

Sport
- Sport: Rowing
- Club: SC DHfK
Medal record
Women's rowing
Representing East Germany
Olympic Games
Gold medal – first place	1980 Moscow	Coxed four
World Rowing Championships
Gold medal – first place	1982 Lucerne	Coxless pair
Gold medal – first place	1983 Duisburg	Coxless pair
Silver medal – second place	1978 Karapiro	Eight
Silver medal – second place	1979 Bled	Eight
Silver medal – second place	1981 Munich	Coxed four

Silvia Fröhlich (née Arndt, born 24 February 1959) is a German rower who won a gold medal in the coxed fours at the 1980 Summer Olympics. She also won two gold and three silver medals at the world championships of 1978–1983, most of them with Marita Sandig. After retiring from competitions, she worked as a dentist.

She competed at the 1978 World Championships under her maiden name and competed under her married name a year later in Bled.
