= Pamela Westendorf-Marshall =

Australian rower

Pam Westendorf
Personal information
- Born: 28 September 1959 (age 66)

Sport
- Country: Australia
- Sport: Rowing
- Club: Dimboola Rowing Club; Melbourne University Boat Club; Corio Bay rowing club

Achievements and titles
- Olympic finals: 1980 Moscow W4+
- National finals: W4- 10 times (1977–94); LW4- 3 times (1987-91)
Medal record
Women's rowing
Representing Australia
World Rowing Championships
Silver medal – second place	1990 Lake Barrington	LW4-

Pamela Westendorf (born 28 September 1959) is an Australian former representative rower. She won twenty-three Australian national championships, was an Olympian, represented at five World Championships over a twelve-year period and won a silver medal at the 1990 World Rowing Championships.

== Club and state rowing ==
Westendorf started her rowing career as a schoolgirl in Dimboola, Victoria. Her senior club rowing was from the Dimboola Rowing Club and later from the Melbourne University Boat Club.

Westendorf first made Victorian state representation as a 15 year old in 1974 Colts series raced against New Zealand. In 1977 at the Australian Rowing Championships she won a women's junior four title in Dimboola colours with Leeanne Whitehouse with whom she would later share state and national honours.

She was selected for Victoria at the senior level in 1977 in the women's heavyweight four which contested the ULVA Trophy at the Interstate Regatta within the Australian Rowing Championships. She rowed in eight consecutive Victorian crews contesting the ULVA Trophy up till 1984. Seven of those crews were victorious including the three from 1982 to 1984 which Westendorf stroked.

By 1987 Westendorf had shifted down to the lightweight division and selected in the Victorian lightweight coxless four which contested and won the Victoria Cup at the Interstate Regatta. She raced and won that event again in 1990 and 1991. In 1992 she rowed her last State appearance for Victoria – back in the heavyweight coxless four.

She rowed in Dimboola Rowing Club colours contesting and winning three Australian national titles in 1982 in the pair, the four and the eight. She won in the pair and the eight in 1983 and the pair, four and eight in 1984. By 1987 she was representing Melbourne University as a lightweight and won the coxless four national title at the Australian Rowing Championships in 1987. In 1990 she won the lightweight coxless pair championship with Kathy Lloyd and also won in the four. In 1991 she again won the lightweight coxless four Australian championship.

== International representative rowing ==
Westendorf made her Australian representative debut in the women's heavyweight eight who rowed to an eighth place at the 1978 World Rowing Championships in Lake Karapiro, New Zealand. In 1979 at the World Championships in Bled she rowed a coxed four to a fifth place.

The 1980 Summer Olympics were only the second time that women's rowing featured in the Olympic programme and was the first time that Australia sent an Olympic women's crew. A coxed four was easily selected on form, comprising the two fastest pairs and the fastest four in domestic racing. Westendorf was selected in the three seat with Sally Harding, Anne Chirnside, Verna Westwood and Susie Palfreyman in the stern. Their coach was the experienced Victorian, David Palfreyman. The four performed as well as any other Australian crew at the Olympic regatta and was clearly the best western nation crew at that time, rowing to a fifth placing.

Westendorf rowed on after the Olympics and at the 1981 World Rowing Championships in Munich she raced a coxless pair with Jacqueline Marshall to overall eight place. They stayed together as a pair into 1982 still coached by Palfreyman and again raced at World Championships, this time to ninth place.

After a number of years out of national crews, Westendorf was back in the Australian coxless four for her final representative appearance at the 1990 World Rowing Championships in Lake Barrington. There she won her first and only World Championship medal – a silver.

== Coach ==
Post-competitive rowing Westendorf has had a long coaching career at school, club and state level. She has coached school crews at both Geelong College and at Geelong Grammar School. She coached the 1994 Victorian state women's coxless four and the Victorian state women's youth eight in 1995. In 1994 she coached an Australian women's U23 coxless four who contested a Trans-Tasman series.
