= 1981 British Rowing Championships =

- Venue: National Water Sports Centre
- Location: Holme Pierrepont (Nottingham)
- Dates: 17–19 July 1981

The 1981 National Rowing Championships was the tenth edition of the National Championships, held from 17 to 19 July 1981 at the National Water Sports Centre in Holme Pierrepont, Nottingham.

== Senior ==
=== Medal summary ===
Event	Gold	Silver	Bronze
Men Victor Ludorum	London	Kingston	Thames Tradesmen's
Men 1x	Leander Club; Chris Baillieu		
Men 2+	Kingston	Vesta Rowing Club	
Men 2x	Maidenhead / Marlow		
Men 2-	Kingston		
Men 4-	London / Thames Tradesmen's		
Men 4+	Kingston		
Men 4x	A.R.A Composite		
Men 8+	A.R.A Composite		
Whitbread Sprint	Kingston	Lea	Worcester
Women Victor Ludorum	Thames	Kingston	Thames Tradesmen's
Women 1x	Thames Tradesmen's; Beryl Mitchell		
Women 2x	Kingston; Astrid Ayling & Sue McNuff		
Women 2-	Lea		
Women 4+	Thames; Caroline Casey, Astrid Ayling, Sue McNuff, Bernadette Carroll, Sue Brown (cox)		
Women 4x	Kingston / Thames; Caroline Casey, Sarah Hunter-Jones, Jane Cross, Bernadette Carroll, Sue Brown (cox)		
Women 8+	GB senior quad Sally Bloomfield, Alexa Forbes, Belinda Holmes, Lin Clark, Pauline Janson, Gill Hodges, Beverly Jones, Jo Toch, Pauline Wright (cox)	GB junior squad	

== Lightweight ==
=== Medal summary ===
Event	Gold	Silver	Bronze
Men 1x	Nottingham & Union		
Men 2x	Dart Totnes / Staines		
Men 4-	Thames Tradesmen's		
Men 8+	A.R.A Composite		

== Junior ==
=== Medal summary ===
Event	Gold	Silver	Bronze
Men Victor Ludorum	St Edward's	Hampton School	Pangbourne College / St George's College
Men 1x	Tees		
Men 2-	St Edward's School |	Belmont Abbey School B.C.	
Men 2x	Evesham / St Ives		
Men 2+	Derby / Nottingham		
Men 4-	Hampton School / Emanuel School / Nottingham		
Men 4+	Royal Shrewsbury School		
Men 4x	A.R.A Composite		
Men 8+	A.R.A Composite		
J16 Victor Ludorum	Forest School	Shiplake College	Lea
Men J16 1x	Weybridge		
Men J16 2-	Great Marlow School		
Men J16 2x	St George's College		
Men J16 2+	St Edward's School		
Men J16 4+	Shiplake College		
Men J16 4-	Great Marlow School		
Men J16 8+	Kingston Grammar School / Shiplake College		
Women Victor Ludorum	Weybridge Ladies	Lea	Nottingham
Women 1x	Whitehill School		
Women 2x	Peterborough City		
Women 2-	Derby		
Women 4+	Lea		
Women 4x	Nottingham		
Women 8+	A.R.A Composite		

Key

Symbol	meaning
1, 2, 4, 8	crew size
+	coxed
-	coxless
x	sculls
14	Under-14
15	Under-15
16	Under-16
J	Junior
