= Romy Saalfeld =

German rower (born 1960)

Medal record

Women's rowing

Representing East Germany

Olympic Games
Gold medal – first place	1980 Moscow	Coxed four

World Rowing Championships
Silver medal – second place	1981 Munich	W4+

Romy Saalfeld (born 14 December 1960, in Weißenfels) is a German rower.
