= Florica Silaghi =

Romanian rower

Personal information
- Nationality: Romanian
- Born: 4 May 1957 (age 69)

Sport
- Sport: Rowing
Medal record
Women's rowing
Representing Romania
World Championships
Bronze medal – third place	1978 Karapiro	Coxed four

Florica Silaghi (born 4 May 1957) is a Romanian rower. She competed in the women's coxed four event at the 1980 Summer Olympics.
