= Ramona Kapheim =

East German rower (born 1958)

Medal record

Women's rowing

Representing East Germany

Olympic Games
Gold medal – first place	1980 Moscow	Coxed four

World Rowing Championships
Silver medal – second place	1979 Bled	Eight

Ramona Kapheim (née Jahnke; born 8 January 1958) is a German rower.
