= Great Marlow School Boat Club =

British rowing club

- Location: Gossmore recreation ground, (until December 2025) Marlow, Buckinghamshire, England
- Coordinates: 51.564311°N 0.760862°W
- Founded: reformed 2008
- Affiliations: British Rowing (boat code GMS)
- Website: www.gmsboatclub.co.uk

Great Marlow School Boat Club (GMSBC) is a rowing club on the River Thames, based in Marlow, Buckinghamshire, England. The club belongs to Great Marlow School.

== History ==
The club was reformed in 2008 following several lottery grants and initially shared the facilities of the Marlow Rowing Club.

The following year in 2009 the club moved out of the Marlow RC boathouse and moved to Longridge Activity Centre on Quarry Wood Lane, where it shares the facilities with Sir William Borlase's Grammar School Boat Club.

The facilities for rowing at the Longridge Outdoor Activity Centre were limited with boats being operated from outdoor racks, which led to a 20 year search at 15 locations before an application for a new boathouse was submitted at Gossmore Lane on the opposite side of the river. The facility called the Marlow and District Schools Boathouse is due to open in December 2025. The construction met with some controversy over using Green belt land to build the boathouse.

== Honours ==
=== British champions ===
Year	Winning crew/s
1978	Men J16 4+
1981	Men J16 2-, Men J16 4-
1983	Women J18 1x
2012	Open J16 4-

== See also ==
- Rowing on the River Thames
