= Aleksander von der Bellen =

Russian liberal and nobleman (1859–1924)

- Александр фон дер Беллен
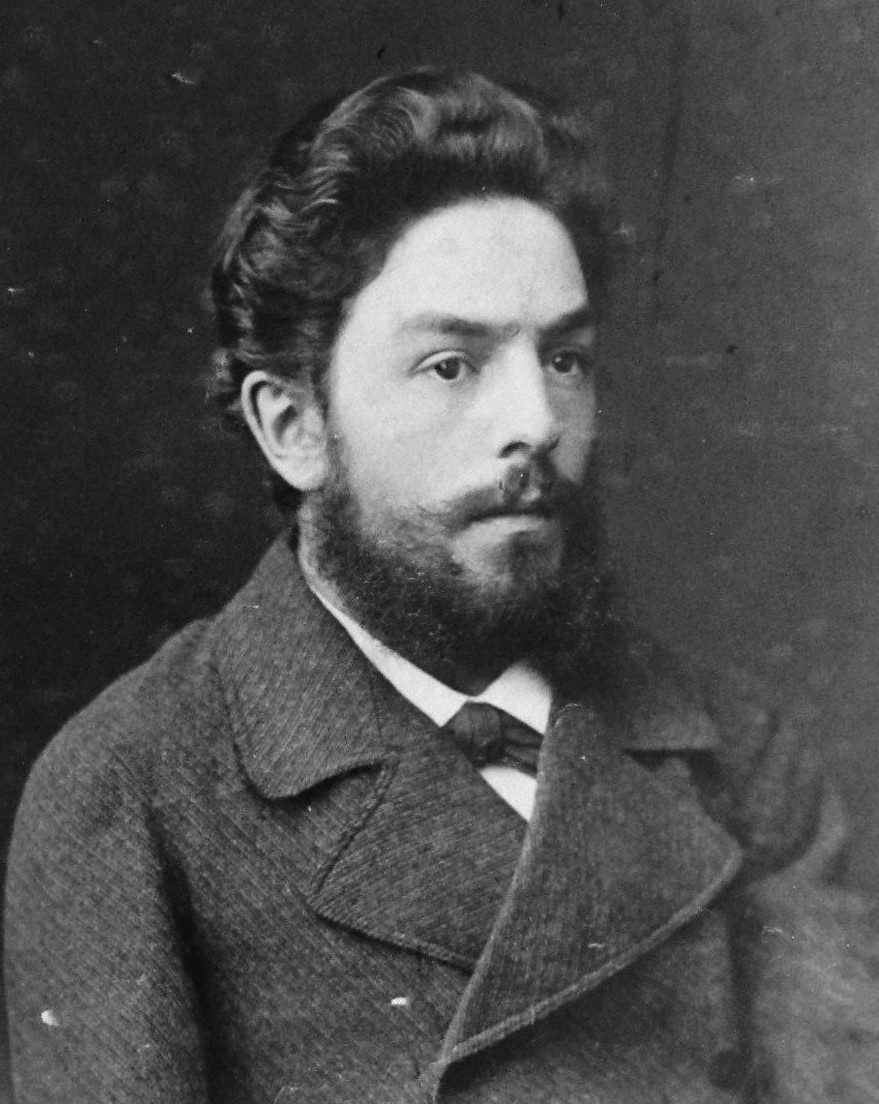

Personal details
- Born: 5 July 1859 Pskov, Russia
- Died: 11 February 1924 (aged 64) Tallinn, Estonia
- Relatives: Alexander Van der Bellen (grandson)
- Nickname: Sascha

Aleksander Konstantin von der Bellen (Russian: Александр Фон дер Беллен; 5 July 1859 – 11 February 1924), later known as Alexander van der Bellen, was a Russian liberal politician and nobleman. He was the grandfather of incumbent Austrian president Alexander Van der Bellen.

== Background ==
Bellen belonged to the von der Bellen family, a Russian noble family of Dutch origin, which had been recognised as noble in Russia in the early 19th century and which belonged to the affluent gentry of Pskov. He spoke Russian as his first language.

== Civil service and political career ==
He held various administrative posts in Pskov and in the wider province of the Russian Empire, serving as provincial commissar (head of the provincial government) of Pskov. He was also a member of the Russian Provisional Government in March and July 1917, before the Imperial German Army invaded the Pskov area during World War I.

== Escape to Estonia ==
In the summer of 1919, when Pskov was briefly occupied by the Estonian Army, Bellen fled from the advancing Bolshevik Red Army with his wife and sons and settled in the newly independent Estonia. In Estonia, the family changed the nobiliary particle in its name from the German von to the Dutch van, because the German noble particle, used by many of the Russian nobility, was specifically banned by law in Estonia as an indication of Russian nobility.
