= Rita Todorova =

Bulgarian rower (born 1958)

Medal record

Women's rowing

Representing Bulgaria

Olympic Games
Silver medal – second place	1980 Moscow	Coxed four

Rita Todorova (Bulgarian: Рита Тодорова; born 18 August 1958) is a Bulgarian rower.
