= Galina Sovetnikova =

Russian rower

Olympic medal record

Women's rowing

Representing the Soviet Union
Bronze medal – third place	1980 Moskva	Coxed four

Galina Alexandrovna Sovetnikova (Russian: Гали́на Алекса́ндровна Сове́тникова; born 14 November 1955 in Pskov, Russia) is a former Russian rower who competed in the 1980 Summer Olympics.
