= Rowing at the 1980 Summer Olympics – Women's coxed four =

Women's coxed fours at the Games of the XXII Olympiad
- Venue: Krylatskoye Rowing Canal
- Date: 21–26 July 1980
- Competitors: 31 from 6 nations

Medalists
1st place, gold medalist(s)		Ramona Kapheim; Silvia Fröhlich; Angelika Noack; Romy Saalfeld; Kirsten Wenzel	East Germany
2nd place, silver medalist(s)		Ginka Gyurova; Mariyka Modeva; Rita Todorova; Iskra Velinova; Nadiya Filipova	Bulgaria
3rd place, bronze medalist(s)		Mariya Fadeyeva; Galina Sovetnikova; Marina Studneva; Svetlana Semyonova; Nina Cheremisina	Soviet Union

The women's coxed four rowing competition at the 1980 Summer Olympics took place at Krylatskoye Sports Complex Canoeing and Rowing Basin, Moscow, Soviet Union. The event was held 21–26 July 1980.

== Heats ==
Winner of each heat advanced to final. The remaining teams must compete in repechage for the remaining spots in the final.

=== Heat One ===
Rank	Rowers	Country	Time
1	Ginka Gyurova, Mariyka Modeva, Rita Todorova, Iskra Velinova, Nadiya Filipova	Bulgaria	3:26.75
2	Georgeta Militaru-Maşca, Florica Silaghi, Maria Tănasă-Fricioiu, Valeria Cătescu, Aneta Matei	Romania	3:31.42
3	Anne Chirnside, Verna Westwood, Pam Westendorf, Sally Harding, Susie Palfreyman	Australia	3:34.08

=== Heat Two ===
Rank	Rowers	Country	Time
1	Ramona Kapheim, Silvia Fröhlich, Angelika Noack, Romy Saalfeld, Kirsten Wenzel	East Germany	3:25.22
2	Mariya Fadeyeva, Galina Sovetnikova, Marina Studneva, Svetlana Semyonova, Nataliya Kazak	Soviet Union	3:28.72
3	Pauline Janson, Bridget Buckley, Pauline Hart, Jane Cross, Sue Brown	Great Britain	3:48.13

== Repechage ==
The top three teams in the repechage heat qualified for the finals.

Rank	Rowers	Country	Time
1	Mariya Fadeyeva, Galina Sovetnikova, Marina Studneva, Svetlana Semyonova, Nina Cheremisina	Soviet Union	3:21.51
2	Georgeta Militaru-Maşca, Florica Silaghi, Maria Tănasă-Fricioiu, Valeria Cătescu, Aneta Matei	Romania	3:23.91
3	Anne Chirnside, Verna Westwood, Pam Westendorf, Sally Harding, Susie Palfreyman	Australia	3:26.77
4	Pauline Janson, Bridget Buckley, Pauline Hart, Jane Cross, Sue Brown	Great Britain	3:35.85

== Finals ==
Rank	Rowers	Country	Time
1st place, gold medalist(s)	Ramona Kapheim, Silvia Fröhlich, Angelika Noack, Romy Saalfeld, Kirsten Wenzel	East Germany	3:19.27
2nd place, silver medalist(s)	Ginka Gyurova, Mariyka Modeva, Rita Todorova, Iskra Velinova, Nadiya Filipova	Bulgaria	3:20.75
3rd place, bronze medalist(s)	Mariya Fadeyeva, Galina Sovetnikova, Marina Studneva, Svetlana Semyonova, Nina Cheremisina	Soviet Union	3:20.92
4	Georgeta Militaru-Maşca, Florica Silaghi, Maria Tănasă-Fricioiu, Valeria Cătescu, Aneta Matei	Romania	3:22.08
5	Anne Chirnside, Verna Westwood, Pam Westendorf, Sally Harding, Susie Palfreyman	Australia	3:26.37

== Sources ==
- Fizkultura i Sport, ed. (1981). The Official Report of the Games of the XXII Olympiad Moscow 1980 Volume Three (PDF). p. 120.
