= Susie Palfreyman =

Australian rowing cox (born 1952)

Personal information
- Born: 11 February 1952 (age 73)

Sport
- Country: Australia
- Sport: Rowing
- Club: University of WA Boat Club; Melbourne University Boat Club

Achievements and titles
- Olympic finals: 1980 Moscow W4+
- National finals: ULVA Trophy 1976-1983

Susie Palfreyman (born 11 Feb 1952) is an Australian former representative rowing coxswain. She was a five time national champion, a representative at World Championships and in 1980 was a member of Australia's first Olympic representative women's rowing crew.

== Club and state rowing ==
Susie Palfreyman commenced her senior rowing with the University of Western Australia Boat Club. Later she rowed with the Melbourne University Ladies Boat Club and Mercantile Rowing Club.

She first made state selection for Western Australia in 1973. In 1976 and 1977 she coxed West Australian state women's fours contesting the ULVA Trophy at the Interstate Regatta. By 1978 she had relocated to Victoria and the Melbourne University Boat Club. She coxed Victorian women's crews which won the ULVA Trophy in 1978, 1979, 1980 and 1983.

== International representative rowing ==
Palfreyman was in the stern of the 1979 Australian champion Victorian women's four selected to contest the 1979 World Rowing Championships in Bled. They rowed to a fifth place. That same crew stayed together into the 1980 Olympic year and coached by Susie's husband David Palfreyman, they were selected as the first Australian women's Olympian crew, racing as a coxed four at the 1980 Moscow Olympics. Crewed by Sally Harding, Anne Chirnside, Pam Westendorf and Verna Westwood they again finished in fifth place.

== Administration ==
Palfreyman was the inaugural President of the WA Women’s Rowing Association in 1972. She was President of the University of Western Australia Ladies’ Rowing Club from 1973 to 1974 and President of Melbourne University Ladies’ Rowing Club in 1980. Susie was also founding President of the Head of the Schoolgirls, the largest single sex regatta in the southern hemisphere.
