= Churches of the Pskov School of Architecture =

UNESCO World Heritage Site
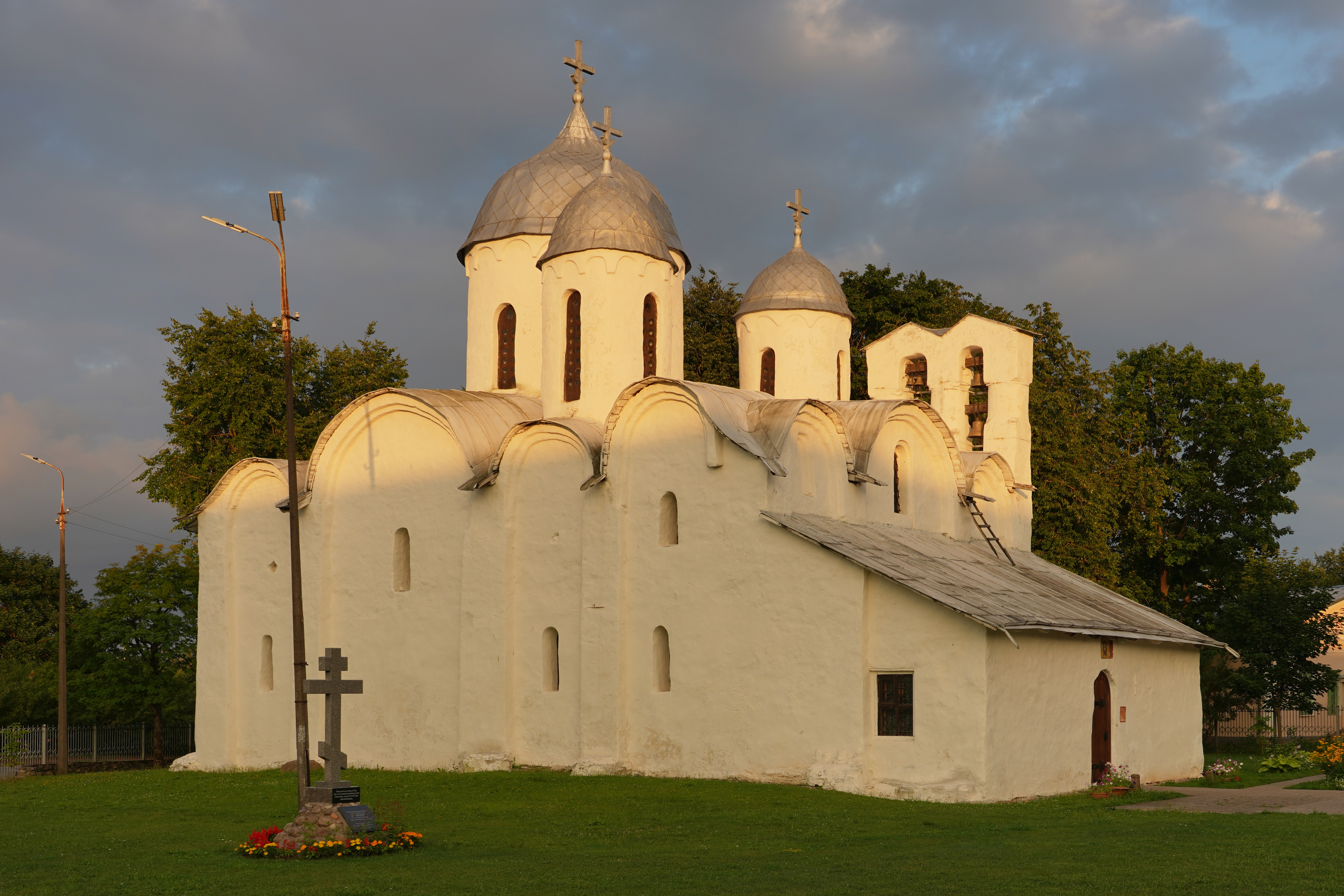
- The mid-12th-century cathedral of St. John. Dozens of similar quaint little churches are scattered throughout Pskov.
- Interactive map of Churches of the Pskov School of Architecture
- Criteria: Cultural: (ii)
- Reference: 1523
- Inscription: 2019 (43rd Session)
- Area: 29.32 ha (72.5 acres)
- Buffer zone: 625.6 ha (1,546 acres)

Churches of the Pskov School of Architecture is a UNESCO World Heritage Site, listed in 2019. The site comprises ten churches or monasteries and related buildings around the city of Pskov in the Russian Federation. They represent the work of the Pskov School that drew from the Byzantine and Novgorod traditions, fused them with the local vernacular tradition, and adjusted the architecture to the use of local resources. The churches date from the 12th to the early 17th century, with the peak of this style in the 15th and 16th centuries. The architects from Pskov worked on monuments in several Russian cities, including Moscow, Kazan, and Sviyazhsk. It was inscribed on the World Heritage List by the decision of the 43rd session of the UNESCO World Heritage Committee in July 2019.

== List of ten churches comprising the world heritage inscribed site ==
Site name	GPS coordinates
Cathedral of Ioann Predtecha (John the Precursor) of the Ivanovsky Monastery	57.82580443427801°N 28.318031545097604°E
Ensemble of the Spaso-Mirozhsky Monastery: the Transfiguration Cathedral	57.80642036085977°N 28.328975444965184°E
Church of the Archangel Michael with a bell tower	57.818153544276846°N 28.333783828505517°E
Church of Pokrova (Intercession) from the Prolom	57.80528476319717°N 28.334096174051442°E
Church of Cosmas and Damian	57.82318236417752°N 28.333533158216742°E
Church Georgiya Vzvoza	57.8098119864739°N 28.332475588847494°E
Church of the Epiphany	57.82284397755641°N 28.338755473485488°E
Church of St. Nicholas from Usokhi	57.815490366511234°N 28.33426338535661°E
Church of Basil the Great on Gorka	57.81521421345883°N 28.335755912526288°E
Ensemble of the Snetogorsky Monastery: The Cathedral of the Nativity of the Mother of God	57.835134504477615°N 28.263008265267892°E
