= Valeria Cătescu =

Romanian rower

Personal information
- Nationality: Romanian
- Born: 17 September 1953 (age 72) Berești-Meria, Romania

Sport
- Sport: Rowing

Valeria Cătescu (born 17 September 1953) is a Romanian rower. She competed in the women's coxed four event at the 1980 Summer Olympics.
