= Verna Westwood =

Australian rower (born 1955)

Personal information
- Nationality: Australian
- Born: 30 August 1955 (age 70)

Sport
- Sport: Rowing
- Club: Uni of WA Rowing Club; MUBC

Achievements and titles
- Olympic finals: 1980 Moscow W4+
- National finals: ULVA Trophy 1978-1980

Verna Westwood (born 30 August 1955) is an Australian former representative rower. She was seven times an Australian national champion, represented at two World Rowing Championships and was a member of Australia's first Olympic representative women's rowing crew, competing in the women's coxed four event at the 1980 Summer Olympics.

== Club and state rowing ==
A West Australian, Westwood commenced her senior rowing aged 17 at the University of Western Australia. She won the Australian University Championship title in a Uni of WA coxed four in 1976. During her representative years at the elite level she raced at national regattas in Melbourne University Boat Club colours.

Her first state selection for Western Australia came in 1977 as a reserve for the coxed four contesting the ULVA Trophy at the annual Interstate Regatta within the Australian Rowing Championships. She did not race. In 1978 she stroked the West Australian women's coxed four to a silver medal in the ULVA Trophy contest. By 1979 Westwood had relocated to Melbourne and the MUBC to pursue her national selection goals. She was selected in the Victorian representative senior coxed fours at stroke in 1979 and in the two seat in 1980, both of which were victors at those year's Interstate Regattas.

At Australian Rowing Championships in the late 1970s Westwood won a number of Australian titles. In Uni of WA colours she won the women's senior four championship in 1978. Racing for the MUBC she won gold in the women's elite coxed four and women's open eight in 1979 and 1980.

== International representative rowing ==
Westwood made her Australian representative debut in the women's heavyweight eight which rowed to an eighth place at the 1978 World Rowing Championships in Lake Karapiro, New Zealand.

In 1979 the Australian champion Victorian women's four including Westwood was selected intact to contest the 1979 World Rowing Championships in Bled. They rowed to a fifth place. That same crew stayed together into the 1980 Olympic year and coached by David Palfreyman, Westwood, Anne Chirnside, Pam Westendorf, Sally Harding and Susie Palfreyman were picked as the first Australian women's Olympian crew, to race as a coxed four at the 1980 Moscow Olympics. They again finished in fifth place.
