= The Boat Race 1981 =

127th Boat Race
- Date: 4 April 1981
- Winner: Oxford
- Margin of victory: 8 lengths
- Winning time: 18 minutes 11 seconds
- Overall record (Cambridge–Oxford): 68–58
- Umpire: Ronnie Howard (Oxford)

Other races
- Reserve winner: Isis
- Women's winner: Oxford

The 127th Boat Race took place on 4 April 1981. Held annually, the Boat Race is a side-by-side rowing race between crews from the Universities of Oxford and Cambridge along the River Thames. Umpired by former Oxford rower Ronnie Howard, it was won by Oxford who passed the finishing post eight lengths ahead of Cambridge, their largest margin of victory since 1898. The race saw Oxford coxed by Sue Brown, the first female cox in the history of the event.

In the reserve race, Isis beat Goldie by 4 1/2 lengths, and in the Women's Boat Race, Oxford were victorious.

== Background ==
The Boat Race is a side-by-side rowing competition between the University of Oxford (sometimes referred to as the "Dark Blues") and the University of Cambridge (sometimes referred to as the "Light Blues"). First held in 1829, the race takes place on the 4.2 miles (6.8 km) Championship Course on the River Thames in southwest London. The rivalry is a major point of honour between the two universities and followed throughout the United Kingdom and broadcast worldwide. Oxford went into the race as reigning champions, having beaten Cambridge by a canvas in the previous year's race. However Cambridge held the overall lead, with 68 victories to Oxford's 57 (excluding the "dead heat" of 1877). The race was sponsored for fifth time by Ladbrokes.

The first Women's Boat Race took place in 1927, but did not become an annual fixture until the 1960s. Up until 2014, the contest was conducted as part of the Henley Boat Races, but as of the 2015 race, it is held on the River Thames, on the same day as the men's main and reserve races. The reserve race, contested between Oxford's Isis boat and Cambridge's Goldie boat has been held since 1965. It usually takes place on the Tideway, prior to the main Boat Race.

Christopher Dodd writing in The Guardian noted Oxford's aggressiveness during the preparations for the race, suggesting that they were "set to humiliate their opponents if they possibly can." Dodd went on to predict that Oxford would win by their greatest margin since the 1898 race. Meanwhile, Cambridge had reorganised their seating order the week before the race. Oxford's boat was named after Russell Crockford who had rowed in Oxford's successful 1978 and 1979 races. He was killed in a car accident the previous year on his way to a regatta in Australia.

Umpire Ronnie Howard modified the starting arrangements, making the boats commence the race closer together to dissuade the coxes steering into one another from the start. He warned both coxes that should they foul, he would disqualify them.

== Crews ==
Sue Brown was selected to cox the Oxford boat, and became the first female competitor in the history of the Boat Race. Although she had learned to cox at Wadham, she had already been selected to represent Great Britain in the Women's coxed fours at the 1980 Summer Olympics in Moscow. She had impressed Oxford coach Dan Topolski who chose her for the Dark Blues. Her selection caused a furore; according to Dodd, "Sue Brown must have passed before more shutters than anyone except for Lady Diana Spencer". She was advised by Colin Moynihan who had coxed Oxford to their largest victory of the century in the 1977 race. Boris Rankov was making his fourth appearance, but this time as a junior fellow of St Hugh's, rather than as an undergraduate at Corpus Christi. In doing so, he became the first representative of a women's college in the men's Boat Race.

The Oxford crew weighed an average of 13 st 8 lb (86.0 kg), 1.5 pounds (0.68 kg) more per rower than their opponents. The race saw the return of no fewer than twelve former Blues, six in each crew. Only Richard Yonge, Richard Emerton and Brown for Oxford and R. Stephens, M. Clark and Mike Cowie for Cambridge were new to the race. Graeme Hall was the Cambridge finishing coach, while Oxford's Dan Topolski took over that role from Steve Royle two weeks prior to the race.

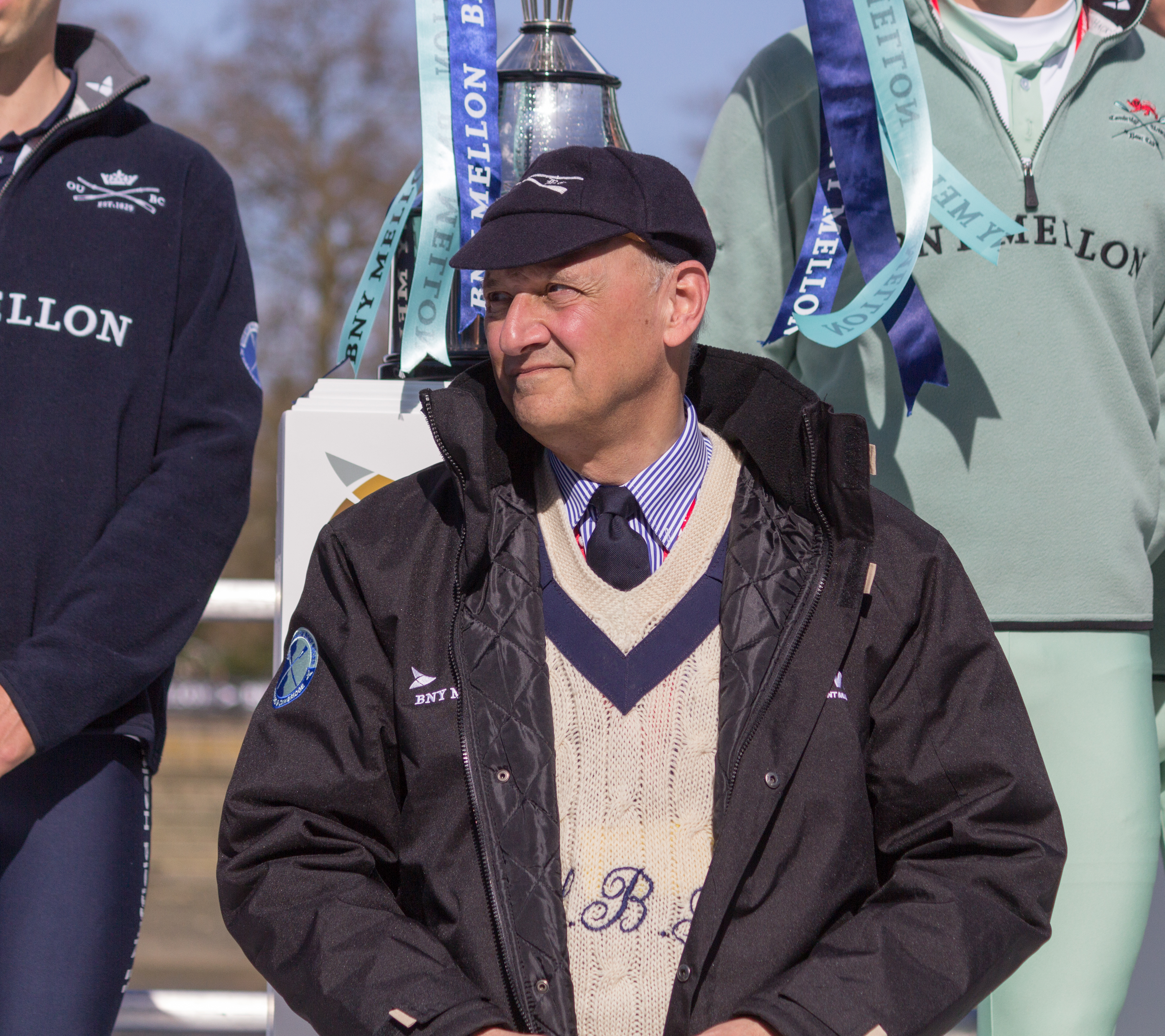
Boris Rankov (pictured in 2015) made the fourth of his six appearances for Oxford.

Seat	Oxford			Cambridge		
Seat	Name	College	Weight	Name	College	Weight
Bow	P. J. Head	Oriel	12 st 6 lb	L. W. J. Baart	Gonville and Caius	13 st 2 lb
2	N. A. Conington	Oriel	12 st 10 lb	M. F. Panter	Lady Margaret Boat Club	13 st 12 lb
3	R. P. Yonge	New College	14 st 4 lb	R. J. Stephens	Emmanuel	13 st 5 lb
4	R. P. Emerton	Christ Church	13 st 1 lb	M. J. S. Clark	Downing	13 st 9 lb
5	N. B. Rankov	St Hugh's	14 st 5 lb	M. P. Cowie	Fitzwilliam	13 st 7 lb
6	C. J. Mahoney	Oriel	13 st 8 lb	A. G. Phillips	Jesus	13 st 0 lb
7	M. D. Andrews	Oriel	14 st 1 lb	J. S. Palmer	Pembroke	14 st 5 lb
Stroke	J. L. Bland	Merton	14 st 1 lb	A. D. Dalrymple	Downing	12 st 12 lb
Cox	S. Brown	Wadham	6 st 8 lb	C. J. Wigglesworth	Jesus	8 st 0 lb
Source: (P) – Boat club president

== Race ==
The Championship Course along which the Boat Race is contested

Oxford were strong pre-race favourites; Ladbrokes themselves quoted Oxford at odds of five-to-one on to win. Cambridge won the toss for the first time in seven years and elected to start on the Surrey station. The race started at 1 p.m. under umpire Howard's guidance. Both crews rating equally off the start, Oxford took an early lead and led by nine seconds by the Mile Post, allowing her to move the Dark Blue boat in front of Cambridge. Pushing her crew to outrate Cambridge, Oxford extended their lead to 10 seconds by Hammersmith Bridge, 14 seconds by Chiswick Steps, 18 seconds by Barnes Bridge and 23 seconds by the finishing post. Oxford won their sixth consecutive victory by eight lengths in a time of 18 minutes 11 seconds, the largest margin of victory since the Cambridge won the 1973 race by thirteen lengths, and the largest margin of victory in the 20th century for the Dark Blues.

In the reserve race, Isis beat Goldie by five lengths, their second consecutive victory. In the 36th running of the Women's Boat Race, Oxford triumphed, their second consecutive victory.

== Reaction ==
Oxford cox Brown avoided the traditional soaking in the Thames. She later commented: "I steered extremely badly, but we still won." Her coach Topolski said "She did a brilliant job." Dodd, writing in The Guardian, described Oxford's victory as "crushing" following their "undramatic and calculated performance". Jim Railton of The Times was impressed: "Without a doubt it is one of the finest crews Oxford have ever produced, arguably the best."
