= Sally Harding =

Australian rower (born 1952)

Personal information
- Nationality: Australian
- Born: 7 October 1952 (age 72)

Sport
- Sport: Rowing
- Club: YWCA Rowing Club; Melbourne Uni Boat Club

Achievements and titles
- Olympic finals: 1980 Moscow W4+
- National finals: ULVA Trophy 1975-1980

Sally Harding (born 7 October 1952) is an Australian former representative rower. She was a thirteen time Australian national champion, three time representative at World Rowing Championships and was a member of Australia's first Olympic representative women's rowing crew, competing in the women's coxed four event at the 1980 Summer Olympics.

== Club and state rowing ==
Harding commenced her senior rowing with the YWCA Rowing Club in Melbourne but then moved to the Melbourne University Boat Club in 1973. In 1976 and from 1978 she raced for the MUBC although in 1977 Harding and her fellow Victorian sweep oarswoman Vivian Roe rowed from the Mosman Rowing Club under coach Tim Conrad in an effort to ensure their national selection.

Harding first made state selection for Victoria in 1975 in the bow seat of the coxed four which contested and won the ULVA Trophy at the annual Interstate Regatta within the Australian Rowing Championships. She raced in further Victorian women's fours for the ULVA Trophy in 1976, 1978, 1979 and 1980, stroking each of those crews to victory except in 1976. In 1977 whilst rowing for Mosman in Sydney she was approved by the NSWRA for selection into the New South Wales four which she again stroked to victory.

At Australian Rowing Championships in the late 1970s Harding won gold in the women's jubilee (coxed) four in 1975 and 1976, gold in the elite pair in 1977, took gold in a composite women's eight in 1978, gold in the women's elite coxed four and women's open eight in 1979 and 1980.

== International representative rowing ==
In 1975 that year's interstate champion Victorian women's four with Harding in the bow seat was selected in toto as Australia's first ever women's crew to race at a World Rowing Championship. At that regatta in Nottingham they did well to recover from a last placing in their heat to come through the repechage and finish 2nd in the B final for an overall 8th placing at the event.

In 1977 there was no elite women's coxed four event at the Australian Rowing Championships being one factor in Harding and Roe's decision to race as an elite pair under Mosman Rowing Club coach Tim Conrad. They won the national pair title as a Mosman 1 crew. Vicki Spooner rowed in Conrad's other Mosman pair to a fourth placing and selectors had also noticed the form of relative newcomer Anne Chirnside who won the silver in that event in her first year of racing at the elite level. Harding, Roe, Spooner, Chirnside and coxswain Jill McLure were selected as Australia's coxed four entrants for the 1977 World Championships in Amsterdam. They made the A final and finished in fifth place.

As in 1975, the 1979 Australian champion Victorian women's four with Harding at stroke was selected intact to contest the 1979 World Rowing Championships in Bled. They rowed to a fifth place. That same crew stayed together into the 1980 Olympic year and coached by David Palfreyman, Harding, Anne Chirnside, Pam Westendorf, Verna Westwood and Susie Palfreyman were selected as the first Australian women's Olympian crew, to race as a coxed four at the 1980 Moscow Olympics. They again finished in fifth place.

== Personal ==
Harding married fellow 1980 Australian rowing Olympian Andrew Withers.
