= Anne Chirnside =

Australian rower (born 1954)

Personal information
- Nationality: Australian
- Born: 9 September 1954 (age 71)

Sport
- Sport: Rowing
- Club: Melbourne University Boat Club; YWCA Rowing Club

Achievements and titles
- Olympic finals: 1980 Moscow W4+
- National finals: ULVA Trophy 1977-1980

Dr. Anne Elizabeth Chirnside (born 9 September 1954) is an Australian former representative rower and a general practitioner of medicine in rural Victoria. She was an eight time Australian national champion, twice represented at World Rowing Championships and was a member of Australia's first Olympic representative women's rowing crew, competing in the women's coxed four event at the 1980 Summer Olympics.

== Club and state rowing ==
Chirnside commenced her senior rowing with the Melbourne University Boat Club in 1973. From 1976 to 1978 she raced for the YWCA Rowing Club in Melbourne but then returned to the MUBC.

She first made state selection for Victoria in 1977 as a reserve for the coxed four to contest the ULVA Trophy at the annual Interstate Regatta within the Australian Rowing Championships, though she did not race. She raced and won the ULVA Trophy in senior Victorian women's fours in 1978, 1979 and 1980.

At Australian Rowing Championships in the late 1970s Chirnside won a silver medal in the elite pair in 1977, took gold in a composite women's eight in 1978, gold in the women's elite coxed four and women's open eight in 1979 and 1980.

== International representative rowing ==
The 1979 Australian champion Victorian women's four with Chirnside in the bow seat was selected in toto to contest the 1979 World Rowing Championships in Bled. They rowed to a fifth place. That same crew stayed together into the 1980 Olympic year and coached by David Palfreyman, Chirnside, Sally Harding, Pam Westendorf, Verna Westwood and Susie Palfreyman were selected as the first Australian women's Olympian crew, to race as a coxed four at the 1980 Moscow Olympics. They again finished in fifth place.

== Post rowing ==
Chirnside coached the Geelong College first four from 1981 to 1985. She completed medical studies at Melbourne University and operated a general practice in Little River in the Wyndham local government area of outer Melbourne.

She married fellow 1980 Australian rowing Olympian Tim Young. For a period they owned the historic rural property Mouyong in the Little River area. That property had historical connections to earlier generations of the Chirnside family.
