= Iskra Velinova =

Bulgarian rower (born 1953)

Personal information
- Native name: Искра Велинова
- Nationality: Bulgarian
- Born: 18 August 1953 (age 72) Sofia, Bulgaria
- Height: 171 cm (5 ft 7 in)
- Weight: 72 kg (159 lb)
Medal record
Women's rowing
Representing Bulgaria
Olympic Games
Silver medal – second place	1980 Moscow	Coxed four
World Rowing Championships
Silver medal – second place	1975 Nottingham	Coxed quad sculls
Silver medal – second place	1977 Amsterdam	Single sculls
Bronze medal – third place	1981 Munich	Double sculls

Iskra Velinova (Bulgarian: Искра Велинова; born 18 August 1953 in Sofia) is a Bulgarian rower.
