= Mirozhsky Monastery =

Coordinates: 57.8056°N 28.3292°E

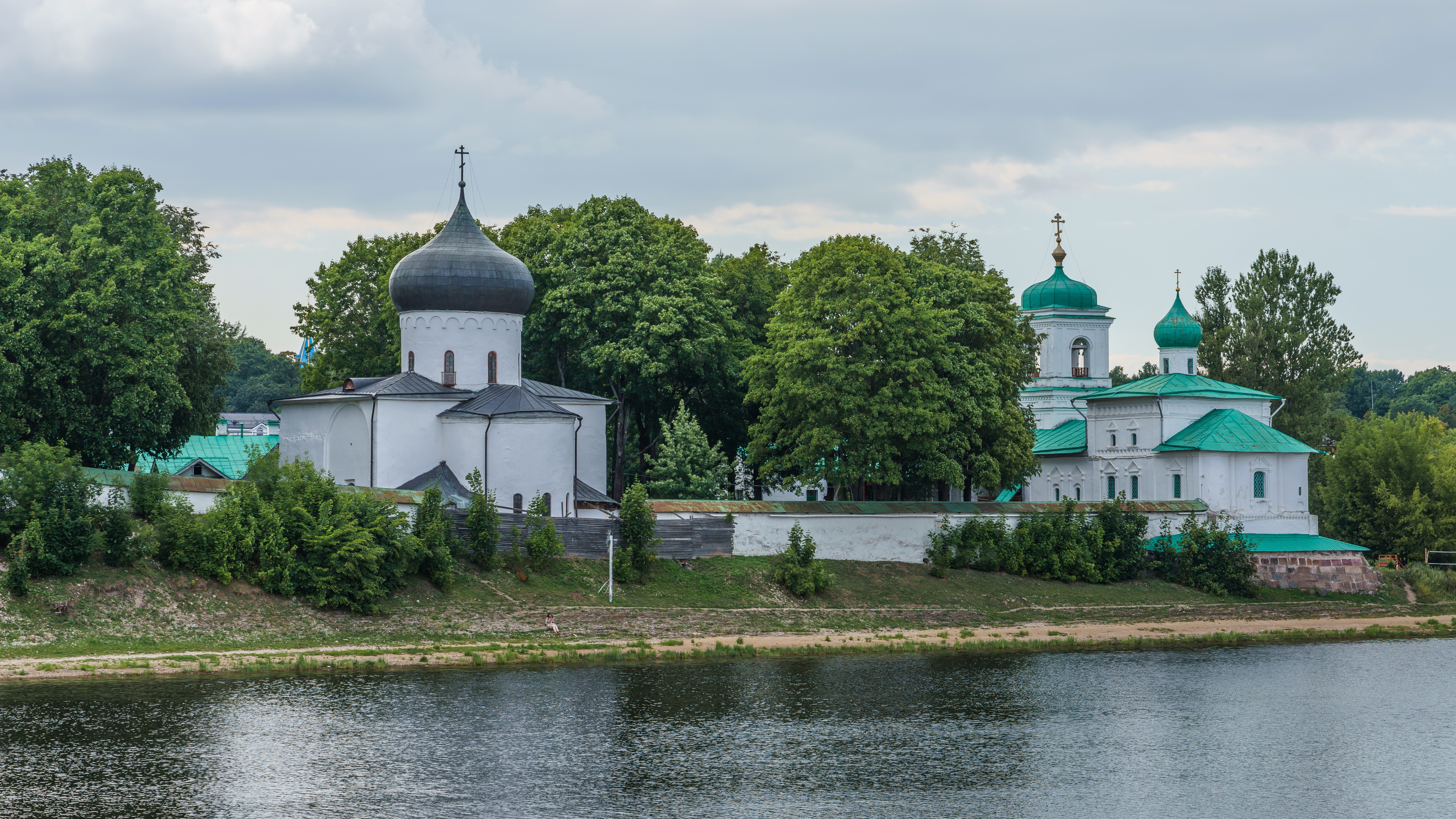
Panorama of the monastery. The Transfiguration Cathedral is on the left.

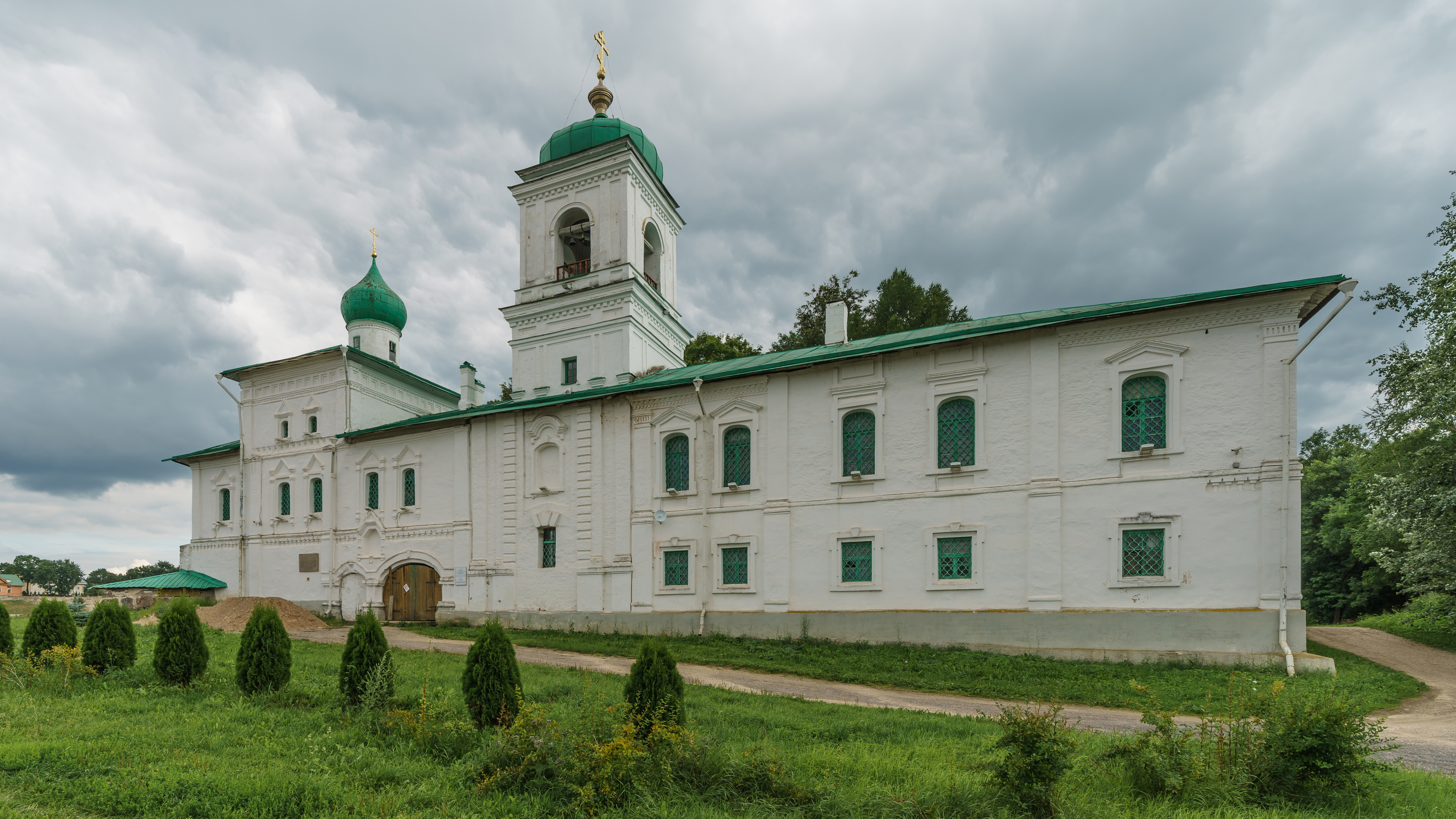
St. Stephen's Church, and the bell tower

Mirozhsky Monastery is a 12th century Russian Orthodox monastery complex in Pskov, Russia, famous for its frescoes, located in the Christ's Transfiguration Cathedral. The name of the monastery is derived from the name of the Mirozha River, since the monastery is located at the place where the Mirozha joins the Velikaya River, on the left bank of the Velikaya. The catholicon of the monastery is one of the two pre-Mongol buildings which survived in Pskov, and contains the frescoes of the 12th century. The monastery, together with the Transfiguration Cathedral, is part of the Churches of the Pskov School of Architecture, which became an World Heritage Site in 2019.

== History ==
The exact date of the founding of the monastery is not known, though it is known that it was founded at some point in the 12th century. The Mirozhsky Monastery is associated with Nifont of Novogrod.

The monastery, located 20 minutes walk from the Pskov Krom, was one of the cultural centers of the city.

== Architecture ==
The ancient buildings, with the exception of the Christ's Transfiguration Cathedral, have not survived. Now the architectural ensemble consists of:

- Christ's Transfiguration Cathedral (12th–beginning of the 20th century)
- Prior’s house (16th—19th centuries)
- St Stephen's Church (17th century)
- Dorter, literally “Fraters’ House” (end of 18th—19th centuries)
- Cells (17th—19th centuries)
- Bathhouse (beginning of the 19th century)
- Outer wall (1799—1805)
