= Marina Studneva =

Russian former rower (born 1959)

Olympic medal record

Women's rowing

Representing the Soviet Union
Bronze medal – third place	1980 Moskva	Coxed four

Marina Guryevna Studneva (Russian: Мари́на Гу́рьевна Сту́днева; born 2 February 1959) is a Russian former rower who competed in the 1980 Summer Olympics.
