= Mariya Fadeyeva =

Russian former rower

Olympic medal record

Women's rowing

Representing the Soviet Union
Bronze medal – third place	1980 Moskva	Coxed four

Mariya Ivanovna Fadeyeva (Russian: Мари́я Ива́новна Фаде́ева; born 4 March 1958) is a Russian former rower who competed in the 1980 Summer Olympics.
