= Nina Cheremisina =

Russian former rower

Medal record

Women's rowing

Representing the Soviet Union

Olympic Games
Silver medal – second place	1980 Moscow	Coxed quad sculls
Bronze medal – third place	1980 Moscow	Coxed four

Nina Viktorovna Cheremisina (Russian: Ни́на Ви́кторовна Череми́сина; born 14 December 1946) is a Russian former rowing cox, who competed in the 1980 Summer Olympics.
