= Elena Neklyudova =

Russian singer

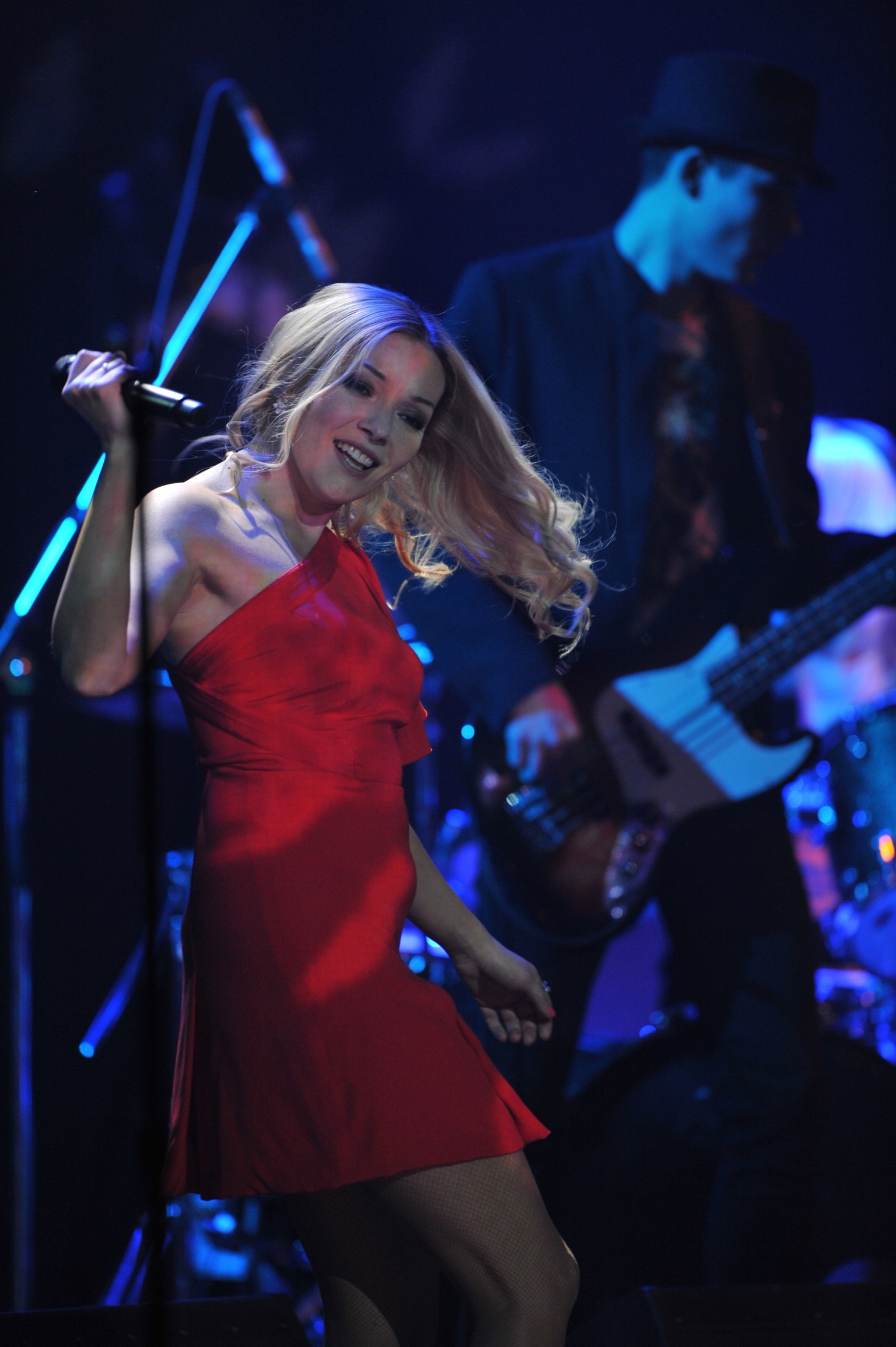
Elena Neklyudova

Elena Vsevolodovna Neklyudova Russian: Елена Всеволодовна Неклюдова — born Elena Soleynikova (Russian: Елена Солейникова) in Pskov, Russia is a singer-songwriter. Her repertoire ranges from alternative rock to smooth jazz. Some of her charting hits are 'Убегаю" Russian: "Running away", "Жизнь" Russian: "The Life" and "Любить'" Russian: "To Love".

== Biography ==
Elena was born in a family of teachers of agricultural technical college. The father of the future singer was keen on music; he played on wind instruments in a college jazz band. He died when the girl was only 3 years old, and the mother had to raise three children without father. Elena is from twins, she has a sister Larissa and a brother Oleg, who is 10 years older.

The passion for music revealed in Elena in the early childhood. She studied in a music school, learning to play the piano and to sing, performed in a school choir. And at the age of 13 together with her sister Larissa she creates her first song. Elena enters the music college for Faculty of Conducting and Choral right after eighth grade.

== Discography ==
- Повозка ( Wagon 2001)
- Шалунья-осень (Minx-autumn 2002)
- Жизнь (The Life 2005)
- Пять поколений (Five generations 2008)
- Непутёвая я (Ne'er-I 2009)
- Стрелы (Arrows 2010)
- Ты услышишь! (You'll hear! 2012)
