= Berești-Meria =

- Commune
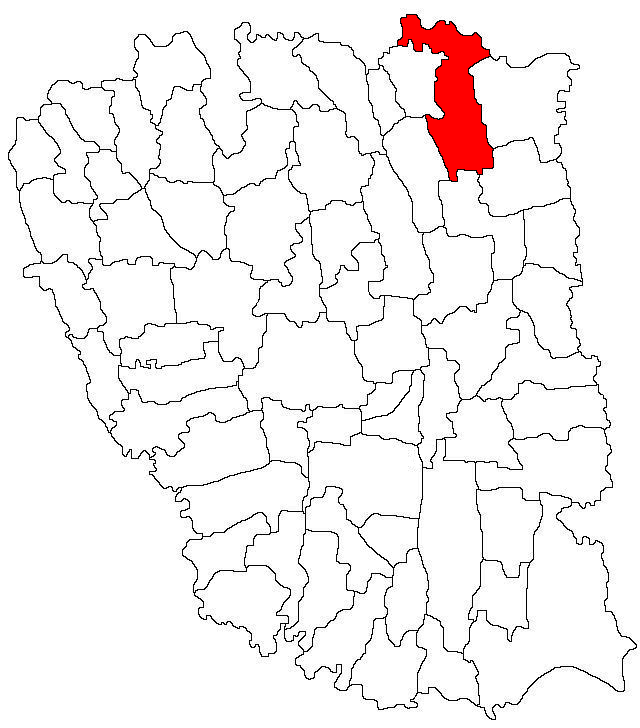
- Location in Galați County

- Location in Romania
- Coordinates: 46.0741°N 27.9189°E
- Country: Romania
- County: Galați

Government
  - Mayor (2024–2028): Adrian Marian Ciucă (PSD)
- Area: 107.85 km^{2} (41.64 sq mi)
- Elevation: 191 m (627 ft)
- Population (2021-12-01): 3,023
  - Density: 28.03/km^{2} (72.60/sq mi)
- Time zone: UTC+02:00 (EET)
  - Summer (DST): UTC+03:00 (EEST)
- Postal code: 807035
- Area code: (+40) 0236
- Vehicle reg.: GL
- Website: www.comunaberesti-meria.ro

Berești-Meria is a commune in Galați County, Western Moldavia, Romania with a population of 3,023 people as of 2021. It is composed of ten villages: Aldești, Balintești, Berești-Meria, Onciu, Pleșa, Prodănești, Puricani, Săseni, Slivna, and Șipote.

Historical population
Year	Pop.	±%
2002	4,386	—
2011	3,771	−14.0%
2021	3,023	−19.8%
Source: Census data

== Natives ==
- Valeria Cătescu (born 1953), rower
- Ion Popescu (born 1929), wrestler
