= Krypetsky Monastery =

Russian Orthodox monastery near Pskov, Russia

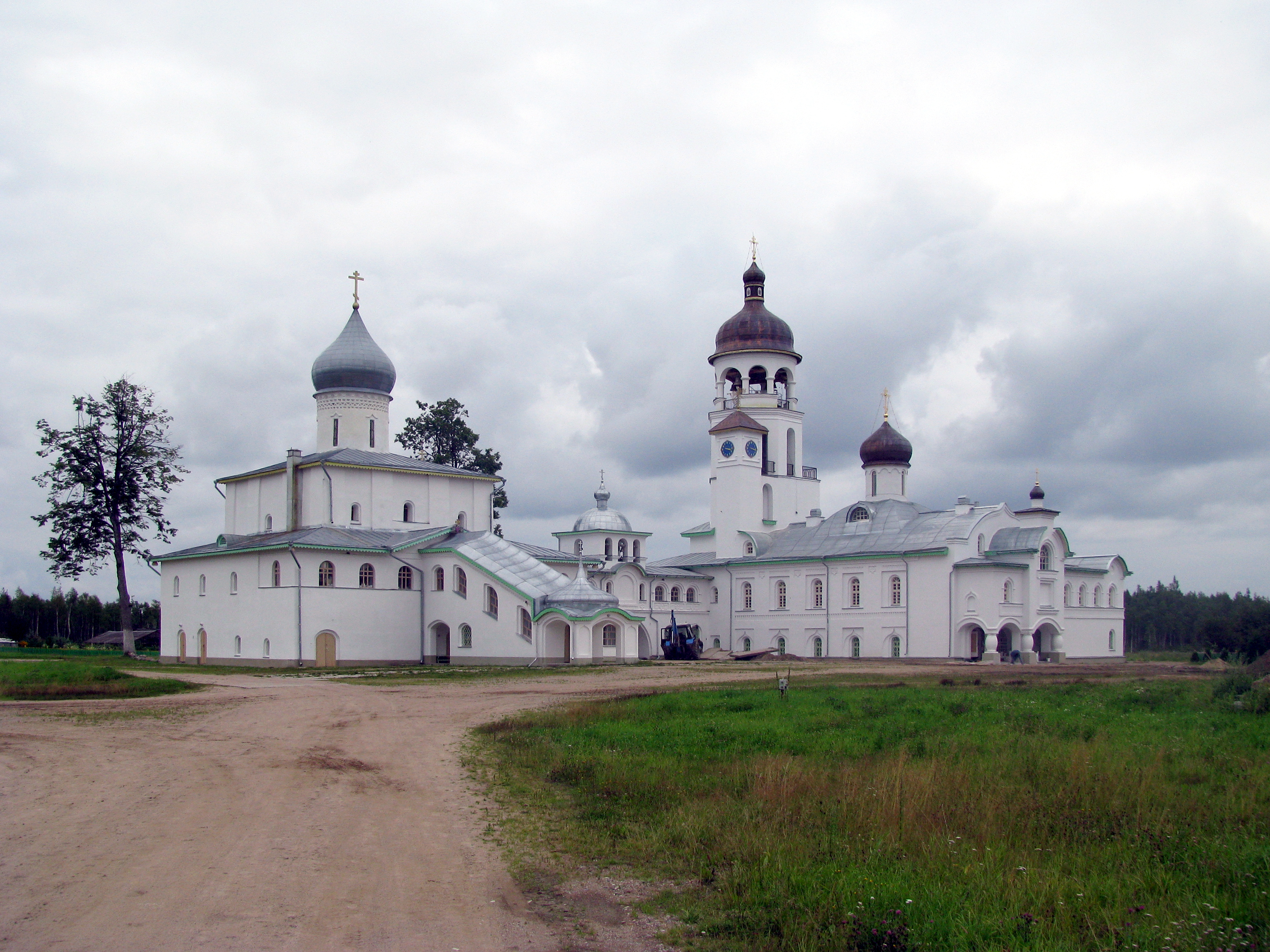
- Interactive map of Krypetsky Monastery

Monastery information
- Order: Orthodox
- Established: 1485
- Diocese: Diocese of Pskov and Porkhov

People
- Founder: St. Savva Krypetsky

Site
- Location: Pskov Oblast, Russia
- Coordinates: 57°59′24″N 28°29′31″E

Krypetsky Monastery (Russian: Крыпецкий Иоанно-Богословский монастырь) is a Russian Orthodox monastery situated 23 km from Pskov.

The monastery was founded in 1485 by St. Savva Krypetsky, a Serbian monk from Mount Athos, in what was then described as an impracticable mire. Two years later, the Pskov veche supported his establishment by granting a large plot of land to the monks. Prince Obolensky had a road for pilgrims built through the mire to the monastery. St. Savva died on 28 August 1495 and was interred in the then timber cathedral, which was rebuilt in stone in 1547 and still stands.

Famous monks of the Krypetsky Monastery included Basil, who described the life of St. Savva in the 1540s; St. Nilus, who founded the Nilov Monastery on Stolbnyi Island; and the former chancellor Afanasy Ordin-Nashchokin, who had the monastery grounds greatly expanded and improved. In the 18th century, the abbey fell into disrepair, but was restored by Evgeny Bolkhovitinov, a bishop best known for his friendship with Gavriil Derzhavin and the latter's poems dedicated to him.

In 1918, the monastery was disbanded by the Bolsheviks who plundered more than five poods (2,600 troy ounces) of gold in the monastery sacristy and had its Neoclassical belltower disfigured. The abbey was briefly revived during the German occupation of the area in World War II and was finally restituted to the Russian Orthodox Church in 1991.
