= Vladimir Vagin (footballer) =

Russian footballer

Personal information
- Full name: Vladimir Vladimirovich Vagin
- Date of birth: 16 March 1982 (age 44)
- Place of birth: Pskov, Russian SFSR
- Height: 1.80 m (5 ft 11 in)
- Positions: Defender; midfielder

Senior career*
| Years | Team | Apps | (Gls) |
| 2000 | FC Pskov | 2 | (0) |
| 2001 | FC Krylia Sovetov Samara | 0 | (0) |
| 2002–2003 | FC Pskov-2000 | 53 | (0) |
| 2003 | FC Fakel Voronezh | 5 | (0) |
| 2004–2005 | FC Pskov-2000 | 44 | (0) |
| 2005 | FC Vityaz Podolsk | 7 | (0) |
| 2006 | FC Metallurg-Kuzbass Novokuznetsk | 1 | (0) |
| 2006–2007 | FC Saturn Yegoryevsk | 39 | (0) |
| 2008 | FC Pskov-747 | 35 | (1) |
| 2009–2010 | FC Dynamo St. Petersburg | 40 | (1) |
| 2010 | FC Gubkin | 14 | (0) |
| 2011 | FC Tyumen | 23 | (0) |
| 2012 | FC Sever Murmansk | 22 | (0) |
| 2013 | FC Metallurg-Oskol Stary Oskol | 16 | (0) |
- * Club domestic league appearances and goals

Vladimir Vladimirovich Vagin (Russian: Владимир Владимирович Вагин; born 16 March 1982) is a former Russian professional football player.

== Club career ==
He played two seasons in the Russian Football National League for FC Fakel Voronezh and FC Dynamo Saint Petersburg.
