= Bridget Buckley =

British rower

Personal information
- Nationality: British
- Born: 25 June 1955 (age 69)

Sport
- Sport: Rowing

Bridget Buckley (born 25 June 1955) is a British rower. She competed in the women's coxed four event at the 1980 Summer Olympics.
