= Swimming at the 1980 Summer Olympics – Men's 400 metre freestyle =

Men's 400 metre freestyle at the Games of the XXII Olympiad
- Venue: Swimming Pool at the Olimpiysky Sports Complex
- Date: 24 July 1980 (heats & final)
- Competitors: 28 from 16 nations
- Winning time: 3:51.31 OR

Medalists
1st place, gold medalist(s)		Vladimir Salnikov	Soviet Union
2nd place, silver medalist(s)		Andrey Krylov	Soviet Union
3rd place, bronze medalist(s)		Ivar Stukolkin	Soviet Union

The men's 400 metre freestyle event at the 1980 Summer Olympics was held on 24 July at the Swimming Pool at the Olimpiysky Sports Complex.

== Records ==
Prior to this competition, the existing world and Olympic records were as follows.

World record	Vladimir Salnikov (URS)	3:51.20	Potsdam, East Germany	29 February 1980
Olympic record	Brian Goodell (USA)	3:51.93	Montreal, Canada	22 July 1976

The following records were established during the competition:

Date	Event	Name	Nationality	Time	Record
24 July	Final	Vladimir Salnikov	Soviet Union	3:51.31	OR

== Results ==
=== Heats ===
Rank	Heat	Name	Nationality	Time	Notes
1	5	Vladimir Salnikov	Soviet Union	3:54.54	Q
2	3	Andrey Krylov	Soviet Union	3:54.79	Q
3	4	Djan Madruga	Brazil	3:55.69	Q
4	3	Max Metzker	Australia	3:56.42	Q
5	2	Ivar Stukolkin	Soviet Union	3:56.60	Q
6	2	Ron McKeon	Australia	3:56.77	Q
7	1	Sándor Nagy	Hungary	3:56.91	Q
8	5	Daniel Machek	Czechoslovakia	3:57.02	Q
9	1	Graeme Brewer	Australia	3:57.19	
10	5	Rainer Strohbach	East Germany	3:57.22	
11	5	Simon Gray	Great Britain	3:57.60	
12	4	Detlev Grabs	East Germany	3:58.21	
13	3	Zoltán Wladár	Hungary	3:58.37	
14	5	Rafael Escalas	Spain	3:58.45	
15	2	Frank Pfütze	East Germany	3:59.53	
16	1	Borut Petrič	Yugoslavia	3:59.63	
17	3	Andrew Astbury	Great Britain	4:00.30	
18	4	Thomas Lejdström	Sweden	4:01.89	
19	2	Darjan Petrič	Yugoslavia	4:03.54	
20	4	Marcelo Jucá	Brazil	4:03.92	
21	3	Petr Adamec	Czechoslovakia	4:03.97	
22	2	Jean-Marie François	Venezuela	4:04.48	
23	3	Petar Kochanov	Bulgaria	4:05.28	
24	1	Diego Quiroga	Ecuador	4:05.70	
25	5	Radek Havel	Czechoslovakia	4:05.71	
26	1	Kevin Williamson	Ireland	4:09.01	
27	3	José María Larrañaga	Peru	4:11.06	
28	2	Mohamed Abdul Wahab	Kuwait	4:37.68	
	1	Federico Silvestri	Italy	DNS	
	1	Mohamed Bendahmane	Algeria	DNS	
	2	Fernando Lopes	Angola	DNS	
	4	Paulo Frischknecht	Portugal	DNS	
	4	Paolo Revelli	Italy	DNS	
	4	István Koczka	Hungary	DNS	
	5	Abdelhakim Bitat	Algeria	DNS	
	5	Reda Yadi	Algeria	DNS	

=== Final ===
Rank	Name	Nationality	Time	Notes
1st place, gold medalist(s)	Vladimir Salnikov	Soviet Union	3:51.31	OR
2nd place, silver medalist(s)	Andrey Krylov	Soviet Union	3:53.24	
3rd place, bronze medalist(s)	Ivar Stukolkin	Soviet Union	3:53.95	
4	Djan Madruga	Brazil	3:54.15	
5	Daniel Machek	Czechoslovakia	3:55.66	
6	Sándor Nagy	Hungary	3:56.83	
7	Max Metzker	Australia	3:56.87	
8	Ron McKeon	Australia	3:57.00	
