= Swimming at the 1976 Summer Olympics – Men's 400 metre freestyle =

Men's 400 metre freestyle at the Games of the XXI Olympiad
- Venue: Olympic Pool
- Date: 22 July 1976 (heats & final)
- Competitors: 47 from 29 nations
- Winning time: 3:51:93 WR

Medalists
1st place, gold medalist(s)		Brian Goodell	United States
2nd place, silver medalist(s)		Tim Shaw	United States
3rd place, bronze medalist(s)		Vladimir Raskatov	Soviet Union

The men's 400 metre freestyle event for the 1976 Summer Olympics was held in Montreal. The event took place on Thursday, 22 July.

== Heats ==
Heat 1

Rank	Athlete	Country	Time	Notes
1	Pierre Andraca	France	4:00.34	
2	Brett Naylor	New Zealand	4:00.38	
3	Rainer Strohbach	East Germany	4:02.24	
4	Stefan Wenz	West Germany	4:06.25	
5	Kevin Williamson	Ireland	4:09.60	
6	Sigurður Ólafsson	Iceland	4:18.11	

Heat 2

Rank	Athlete	Country	Time	Notes
1	Djan Madruga	Brazil	3:59.62	Q, OR
2	Frank Pfütze	East Germany	4:04.66	
3	Tom Alexander	Canada	4:05.63	
4	Bengt Jönsson	Sweden	4:07.28	
5	Borut Petrič	Yugoslavia	4:07.54	
6	Lutz Löscher	East Germany	4:12.88	
7	Kris Sumono	Indonesia	4:17.48	

Heat 3

Rank	Athlete	Country	Time	Notes
1	Volodymyr Raskatov	Soviet Union	3:57.56	Q, OR
2	Bill Sawchuk	Canada	4:02.18	
3	István Koczka	Hungary	4:03.75	
4	Peter Pettersson	Sweden	4:04.15	
5	Graham Windeatt	Australia	4:04.31	
6	Frank Richardson	Nicaragua	4:40.76	

Heat 4

Rank	Athlete	Country	Time	Notes
1	Steve Holland	Australia	3:58.39	Q
2	Steve Badger	Canada	4:00.14	Q
3	Henk Elzerman	Netherlands	4:02.16	
4	Vladimir Salnikov	Soviet Union	4:02.79	
5	Georgios Karpouzis	Greece	4:12.41	
6	Andreas Schmidt	West Germany	4:14.36	
7	Rui Abreu	Portugal	4:28.43	

Heat 5

Rank	Athlete	Country	Time	Notes
1	Vladimir Mikheyev	Soviet Union	4:00.20	Q
2	Casey Converse	United States	4:00.65	
3	Alan McClatchey	Great Britain	4:02.09	
4	Werner Lampe	West Germany	4:03.04	
5	Arne Borgstrøm	Norway	4:03.49	
6	Gerhard Waldmann	Switzerland	4:09.54	
7	Edwin Borja	Philippines	4:18.97	

Heat 6

Rank	Athlete	Country	Time	Notes
1	Tim Shaw	United States	3:56.40	Q, OR
2	Zoltán Wladár	Hungary	4:00.55	
3	Gordon Downie	Great Britain	4:01.00	
4	Bengt Gingsjö	Sweden	4:04.68	
5	Johan Van Steenberghe	Belgium	4:08.28	
6	Francisco Cañales	Puerto Rico	4:15.78	

Heat 7

Rank	Athlete	Country	Time	Notes
1	Brian Goodell	United States	3:55.24	Q, OR
2	Sándor Nagy	Hungary	4:00.02	Q
3	Max Metzker	Australia	4:00.82	
4	René van der Kuil	Netherlands	4:03.14	
5	David López-Zubero	Spain	4:03.73	
6	Andy Knowles	Bahamas	4:10.78	
7	Tomas Becerra	Colombia	4:14.73	
8	Patrick Novaretti	Monaco	4:20.62	

== Final ==
Rank	Athlete	Country	Time	Notes
1	Brian Goodell	United States	3:51.93	WR
2	Tim Shaw	United States	3:52.54	
3	Volodymyr Raskatov	Soviet Union	3:55.76	
4	Djan Madruga	Brazil	3:57.18	
5	Steve Holland	Australia	3:57.59	
6	Sándor Nagy	Hungary	3:57.81	
7	Vladimir Mikheyev	Soviet Union	4:00.79	
8	Steve Badger	Canada	4:20.83	
