= Swimming at the 1980 Summer Olympics – Men's 200 metre backstroke =

Men's 200 metre backstroke at the Games of the XXII Olympiad
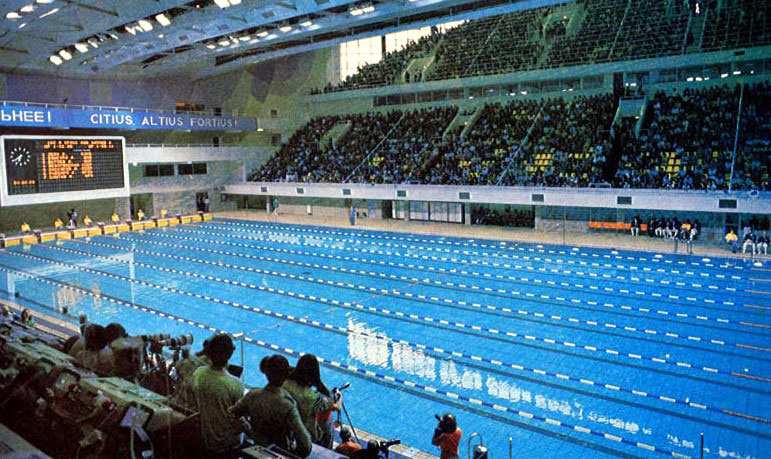
- Olimpiysky Sports Complex pool
- Venue: Swimming Pool at the Olimpiysky Sports Complex
- Date: 26 July
- Competitors: 25 from 16 nations
- Winning time: 2:01.93

Medalists
1st place, gold medalist(s)		Sándor Wladár	Hungary
2nd place, silver medalist(s)		Zoltán Verrasztó	Hungary
3rd place, bronze medalist(s)		Mark Kerry	Australia

The men's 200 metre backstroke event at the 1980 Summer Olympics was held on 26 July at the Swimming Pool at the Olimpiysky Sports Complex. There were 25 competitors from 16 nations, with each nation having up to three swimmers. The event was won by Sándor Wladár of Hungary, with his countryman Zoltán Verrasztó taking second. Mark Kerry of Australia earned bronze. They were the first medals in the event for both nations. The United States' four-Games podium streak (over which the nation earned 10 of 12 possible medals) ended due to the American-led boycott.

== Background ==
This was the sixth appearance of the 200 metre backstroke event. It was first held in 1900. The event did not return until 1964; since then, it has been on the programme at every Summer Games. From 1904 to 1960, a men's 100 metre backstroke was held instead. In 1964, only the 200 metres was held. Beginning in 1968 and ever since, both the 100 and 200 metre versions have been held.

Five of the 8 finalists from the 1976 Games (all but the medalists) returned: fourth-place finisher Mark Tonelli and fifth-place finisher Mark Kerry of Australia, sixth-place finisher Miloslav Roľko of Czechoslovakia, and seventh-place finisher Róbert Rudolf and eighth-place finisher Zoltán Verrasztó of Hungary. The medals in 1976 had been swept by American swimmers; the United States boycotted the 1980 Games. Verrasztó had earned medals at each of the three World Championships held so far (silver in 1973, gold in 1975, and bronze in 1978), and was favored with no American swimmers in the pool.

Ireland, Romania, and Vietnam each made their debut in the event. The Netherlands made its sixth appearance, the only nation to have competed at each appearance of the event to that point.

== Competition format ==
The competition used a two-round (heats and final) format. The advancement rule followed the format introduced in 1952. A swimmer's place in the heat was not used to determine advancement; instead, the fastest times from across all heats in a round were used. There were 4 heats of up to 8 swimmers each. The top 8 swimmers advanced to the final. Swim-offs were used as necessary to break ties.

This swimming event used backstroke. Because an Olympic-size swimming pool is 50 metres long, this race consisted of four lengths of the pool.

== Records ==
Prior to this competition, the existing world and Olympic records were as follows.

World record	John Naber (USA)	1:59.19	Montreal, Canada	24 July 1976
Olympic record	John Naber (USA)	1:59.19	Montreal, Canada	24 July 1976

== Schedule ==
All times are Moscow Time (UTC+3)

Date	Time	Round
Saturday, 26 July 1980	10:00; 20:00	Heats; Final

== Results ==
=== Heats ===
Rank	Heat	Swimmer	Nation	Time	Notes
1	4	Sándor Wladár	Hungary	2:02.62	Q
2	4	Zoltán Verrasztó	Hungary	2:03.08	Q
3	3	Mark Kerry	Australia	2:03.60	Q
4	1	Vladimir Shemetov	Soviet Union	2:04.20	Q
5	3	Michael Söderlund	Sweden	2:04.67	Q
6	1	Douglas Campbell	Great Britain	2:04.78	Q
7	1	Fred Eefting	Netherlands	2:04.84	Q
8	2	Paul Moorfoot	Australia	2:04.87	Q
9	1	Vladimir Dolgov	Soviet Union	2:05.11	
10	2	Miloslav Roľko	Czechoslovakia	2:05.13	
11	2	Viktor Kuznetsov	Soviet Union	2:05.14	
12	3	Jörg Stingl	East Germany	2:05.19	
13	2	Frédéric Delcourt	France	2:05.20	
14	2	Franky De Groote	Belgium	2:06.97	
15	4	Mark Tonelli	Australia	2:07.04	
16	4	Bengt Baron	Sweden	2:07.13	
17	4	Nenad Miloš	Yugoslavia	2:07.51	
18	4	Mihai Mandache	Romania	2:07.97	
19	4	Zbigniew Januszkiewicz	Poland	2:08.11	
20	3	Róbert Rudolf	Hungary	2:08.23	
21	1	Jim Carter	Great Britain	2:09.94	
22	1	David Cummins	Ireland	2:12.45	
23	3	Dietmar Göhring	East Germany	2:14.11	
24	3	Daniel Ayora	Peru	2:17.12	
25	2	Phạm Văn Thành	Vietnam	2:28.40	
—	1	Rui Abreu	Portugal	DNS	
—	2	Djan Madruga	Brazil	DNS	
—	3	Rômulo Arantes	Brazil	DNS	

=== Final ===
Rank	Swimmer	Nation	Time
1st place, gold medalist(s)	Sándor Wladár	Hungary	2:01.93
2nd place, silver medalist(s)	Zoltán Verrasztó	Hungary	2:02.40
3rd place, bronze medalist(s)	Mark Kerry	Australia	2:03.14
4	Vladimir Shemetov	Soviet Union	2:03.48
5	Fred Eefting	Netherlands	2:03.92
6	Michael Söderlund	Sweden	2:04.10
7	Douglas Campbell	Great Britain	2:04.23
8	Paul Moorfoot	Australia	2:06.15
