= Swimming at the 1976 Summer Olympics – Men's 1500 metre freestyle =

Men's 1500 metre freestyle at the Games of the XXI Olympiad
- Date: 19 July 1976 (heats); 20 July 1976 (final)
- Competitors: 31 from 20 nations
- Winning time: 15:02.40 WR

Medalists
1st place, gold medalist(s)		Brian Goodell	United States
2nd place, silver medalist(s)		Bobby Hackett	United States
3rd place, bronze medalist(s)		Stephen Holland	Australia

The men's 1500 metre freestyle event for the 1976 Summer Olympics was held in Montreal. The event took place on 19 and 20 July.

== Records ==
At the start of this event, the existing World and Olympic records were as follows.

World record	Brian Goodell (USA)	15:06.66	Long Beach, United States	21 June 1976
Olympic record	Mike Burton (USA)	15:52.58	Munich, West Germany	4 September 1972

The following records were established during the competition:

Date	Event	Name	Nationality	Time	Record
19 July	Heats	Zoltán Wladár	Hungary	15:37.61	OR
19 July	Heats	Paul Hartloff	United States	15:20.74	OR
20 July	Final	Brian Goodell	United States	15:02.40	WR

== Results ==
=== Heats ===
Heat 1

Rank	Athlete	Country	Time	Notes
1	Zoltán Wladár	Hungary	15:37.61	Q, OR
2	Vladimir Salnikov	Soviet Union	15:39.04	Q
3	David Parker	Great Britain	15:46.60	
4	Borut Petrič	Yugoslavia	16:03.92	
5	Johan Van Steenberghe	Belgium	16:14.13	
6	Georgios Karpouzis	Greece	16:53.92	
7	Sigurður Ólafsson	Iceland	17:25.10	

Heat 2

Rank	Athlete	Country	Time	Notes
1	Paul Hartloff	United States	15:20.74	Q, OR
2	Djan Madruga	Brazil	15:36.95	Q
3	Igor Kushpelev	Soviet Union	15:43.88	
4	Paul Sparkes	Great Britain	15:59.04	
5	Stefan Wenz	West Germany	16:08.20	
6	Kris Sumono	Indonesia	17:09.17	

Heat 3

Rank	Athlete	Country	Time	Notes
1	Bobby Hackett	United States	15:25.49	Q
2	Paul Nash	Australia	15:46.51	
3	Paul Midgley	Canada	15:49.78	
4	István Koczka	Hungary	16:05.54	
5	Kevin Williamson	Ireland	16:54.11	

Heat 4

Rank	Athlete	Country	Time	Notes
1	Steve Holland	Australia	15:25.93	Q
2	Valentin Parinov	Soviet Union	15:41.13	
3	Henk Elzerman	Netherlands	15:51.08	
4	Michael Ker	Canada	15:58.07	
5	Gerhard Waldmann	Switzerland	16:06.41	
6	António de Melo	Portugal	17:24.31	

Heat 5

Rank	Athlete	Country	Time	Notes
1	Brian Goodell	United States	15:34.11	Q
2	Max Metzker	Australia	15:36.14	Q
3	Sándor Nagy	Hungary	15:48.41	
4	Brett Naylor	New Zealand	15:52.68	
5	Mark Treffers	New Zealand	15:56.11	
6	José Bas	Spain	16:28.59	
7	Edwin Borja	Philippines	17:05.75	

=== Final ===
Rank	Name	Nationality	Time	Notes
1st place, gold medalist(s)	Brian Goodell	United States	15:02.40	WR
2nd place, silver medalist(s)	Bobby Hackett	United States	15:03.91	
3rd place, bronze medalist(s)	Stephen Holland	Australia	15:04.66	
4	Djan Madruga	Brazil	15:19.84	
5	Vladimir Salnikov	Soviet Union	15:29.45	
6	Max Metzker	Australia	15:31.53	
7	Paul Hartloff	United States	15:32.08	
8	Zoltán Wladár	Hungary	15:45.97	
