= Swimming at the 1980 Summer Olympics – Men's 100 metre backstroke =

Men's 100 metre backstroke at the Games of the XXII Olympiad
- Venue: Swimming Pool at the Olimpiysky Sports Complex
- Date: 20 July (heats, semifinals); 21 July (final)
- Competitors: 33 from 22 nations
- Winning time: 56.53

Medalists
1st place, gold medalist(s)		Bengt Baron	Sweden
2nd place, silver medalist(s)		Viktor Kuznetsov	Soviet Union
3rd place, bronze medalist(s)		Vladimir Dolgov	Soviet Union

The men's 100 metre backstroke event at the 1980 Summer Olympics was held on 20 and 21 July at the Swimming Pool at the Olimpiysky Sports Complex.

== Records ==
Prior to this competition, the existing world and Olympic records were as follows.

World record	John Naber (USA)	55.49	Montreal, Canada	19 July 1976
Olympic record	John Naber (USA)	55.49	Montreal, Canada	19 July 1976

== Results ==
=== Heats ===
Rank	Heat	Name	Nationality	Time	Notes
1	3	Michael Söderlund	Sweden	57.75	Q
2	1	Vladimir Dolgov	Soviet Union	57.87	Q
3	3	Rômulo Arantes	Brazil	57.90	Q
4	5	Zoltán Verrasztó	Hungary	57.92	Q
5	1	Dietmar Göhring	East Germany	58.02	Q
6	5	Sándor Wladár	Hungary	58.07	Q
7	5	Mark Kerry	Australia	58.08	Q
8	1	Miloslav Roľko	Czechoslovakia	58.15	Q
9	4	Glenn Patching	Australia	58.30	Q
10	4	Paul Marshall	Great Britain	58.35	Q
11	5	Bengt Baron	Sweden	58.46	Q
12	4	Viktor Kuznetsov	Soviet Union	58.47	Q
13	3	Fred Eefting	Netherlands	58.59	Q
14	2	Mark Tonelli	Australia	58.66	Q
15	3	Douglas Campbell	Great Britain	58.75	Q
16	2	Gary Abraham	Great Britain	58.79	Q
17	2	Jörg Stingl	East Germany	58.98	
18	4	Vladimir Shemetov	Soviet Union	59.01	
19	2	Frédéric Delcourt	France	59.16	
20	2	Herwig Bayer	Austria	1:00.04	
21	1	Branimir Popov	Bulgaria	1:00.06	
22	5	Mihai Mandache	Romania	1:00.26	
23	4	Franky De Groote	Belgium	1:00.35	
24	1	Nenad Miloš	Yugoslavia	1:00.41	
25	3	Rui Abreu	Portugal	1:00.62	
26	1	Róbert Rudolf	Hungary	1:00.85	
27	5	Moisés Gosálvez	Spain	1:00.90	
28	2	Ricardo Prado	Brazil	1:01.03	
29	1	Daniel Ayora	Peru	1:03.93	
30	5	Lâm Văn Hoành	Vietnam	1:07.29	
31	2	Lakis Fylaktou	Cyprus	1:08.92	
32	4	Jorge Lima	Angola	1:14.33	
33	3	Pedro Cruz	Mozambique	1:15.25	
	3	David Cummins	Ireland	DNS	
	4	Alberto Mestre	Venezuela	DNS	

=== Semifinals ===
Rank	Heat	Name	Nationality	Time	Notes
1	1	Viktor Kuznetsov	Soviet Union	56.75	Q
2	2	Bengt Baron	Sweden	57.51	Q
3	1	Mark Tonelli	Australia	57.89	Q
4	1	Gary Abraham	Great Britain	57.90	Q
5	2	Fred Eefting	Netherlands	57.91	Q
6	1	Miloslav Roľko	Czechoslovakia	57.97	Q
7	1	Vladimir Dolgov	Soviet Union	58.04	Q
8	1	Sándor Wladár	Hungary	58.05	Q
9	2	Mark Kerry	Australia	58.07	
10	2	Michael Söderlund	Sweden	58.20	
11	2	Rômulo Arantes	Brazil	58.21	
12	1	Zoltán Verrasztó	Hungary	58.57	
13	2	Douglas Campbell	Great Britain	58.61	
14	1	Paul Marshall	Great Britain	58.82	
15	2	Dietmar Göhring	East Germany	58.85	
16	2	Glenn Patching	Australia	1:00.31	

=== Final ===
Rank	Name	Nationality	Time	Notes
1st place, gold medalist(s)	Bengt Baron	Sweden	56.53	
2nd place, silver medalist(s)	Viktor Kuznetsov	Soviet Union	56.99	
3rd place, bronze medalist(s)	Vladimir Dolgov	Soviet Union	57.63	
4	Miloslav Roľko	Czechoslovakia	57.74	
5	Sándor Wladár	Hungary	57.84	
6	Fred Eefting	Netherlands	57.95	
7	Mark Tonelli	Australia	57.98	
8	Gary Abraham	Great Britain	58.38	
