= Swimming at the 1980 Summer Olympics – Men's 4 × 200 metre freestyle relay =

Men's 4 × 200 metre freestyle relay at the Games of the XXII Olympiad
- Venue: Swimming Pool at the Olimpiysky Sports Complex
- Dates: 23 July 1980 (heats & final)
- Competitors: 62 from 13 nations
- Teams: 13
- Winning time: 7:23.50

Medalists
1st place, gold medalist(s)		Sergey Kopliakov, Vladimir Salnikov, Ivar Stukolkin, Andrey Krylov, Sergey Rusin*, Sergey Krasyuk*, Yuri Presekin*	Soviet Union
2nd place, silver medalist(s)		Frank Pfütze, Jörg Woithe, Detlev Grabs, Rainer Strohbach, Frank Kühne*	East Germany
3rd place, bronze medalist(s)		Jorge Fernandes, Marcus Mattioli, Cyro Marques, Djan Madruga; *Indicates the swimmer only competed in the preliminary heats.	Brazil

The men's 4 × 200 metre freestyle relay event at the 1980 Summer Olympics was held on 23 July at the Swimming Pool at the Olimpiysky Sports Complex.

== Records ==
Prior to this competition, the existing world and Olympic records were as follows.

World record	United States (USA); Rowdy Gaines; Bruce Furniss; Bill Forrester; Bobby Hackett	7:20.82	West Berlin, West Germany	24 August 1978
Olympic record	United States; Mike Bruner; Bruce Furniss; John Naber; Jim Montgomery	7:23.22	Montreal, Canada	21 July 1976

== Results ==
=== Heats ===
Rank	Heat	Nation	Swimmers	Time	Notes
1	2	Soviet Union	Sergey Rusin (1:52.55); Sergey Krasyuk (1:53.09); Yuri Presekin (1:52.21); Ivar Stukolkin (1:51.54)	7:29.39	Q
2	1	East Germany	Frank Kühne (1:54.18); Detlev Grabs (1:53.68); Frank Pfütze (1:52.46); Rainer Strohbach (1:52.35)	7:32.67	Q
3	2	Brazil	Jorge Fernandes (1:53.49); Marcus Mattioli (1:52.76); Cyro Delgado (1:53.20); Djan Madruga (1:53.36)	7:32.81	Q
4	2	Australia	Mark Tonelli (1:53.99); Max Metzker (1:54.85); Mark Kerry (1:53.47); Graeme Brewer (1:51.75)	7:34.06	Q
5	2	Sweden	Michael Söderlund (1:53.16); Per-Alvar Magnusson (1:52.77); Anders Rutqvist (1:54.43); Per-Ola Quist (1:53.98)	7:34.34	Q
6	1	France	Marc Lazzaro (1:54.19); Dominique Petit (1:55.25); Pascal Lagat (1:53.44); Fabien Noël (1:51.93)	7:34.81	Q
7	1	Italy	Federico Silvestri (1:56.74); Raffaele Franceschi (1:53.38); Andrea Ceccarini (1:54.15); Paolo Revelli (1:52.70)	7:36.97	Q
8	1	Great Britain	Douglas Campbell (1:53.99); Mark Taylor (1:55.75); Kevin Lee (1:54.27); Andrew Astbury (1:53.35)	7:37.36	Q
9	2	Czechoslovakia	Daniel Machek (1:55.10); Miloslav Rolko (1:56.42); Petr Adamec (1:55.59); Radek Havel (1:55.07)	7:42.18	
10	2	Spain	David López-Zubero (1:53.50); Ramón Lavín (1:55.10); Juan Carlos Vallejo (1:57.99); Juan Pablo Barro (1:56.10)	7:42.69	
11	1	Netherlands	Cees Vervoorn (1:55.16); Peter Drost (1:56.79); Cees Jan Winkel (1:56.94); Fred Eefting (1:53.96)	7:42.85	
12	1	Algeria	Abdelhakim Bitat (2:03.87); Reda Yadi (2:05.35); Mohamed Bendahmane (2:07.81); Mohamed Halimi (2:06.19)	8:23.22	
	2	Bulgaria	Petar Kochanov; Krasimir Tumanov; Petar Stoyanov; Tsvetan Golomeev	DSQ	

=== Final ===
Rank	Nation	Swimmers	Time	Notes
1st place, gold medalist(s)	Soviet Union	Sergey Kopliakov (1:50.00); Vladimir Salnikov (1:51.09); Ivar Stukolkin (1:52.04); Andrey Krylov (1:50.37)	7:23.50	
2nd place, silver medalist(s)	East Germany	Frank Pfütze (1:52.96); Jörg Woithe (1:51.78); Detlev Grabs (1:52.24); Rainer Strohbach (1:51.62)	7:28.60	
3rd place, bronze medalist(s)	Brazil	Jorge Fernandes (1:52.61); Marcus Mattioli (1:52.94); Cyro Delgado (1:52.35); Djan Madruga (1:51.40)	7:29.30	
4	Sweden	Michael Söderlund (1:52.54); Pelle Wikström (1:52.70); Per-Alvar Magnusson (1:53.01); Thomas Lejdström (1:51.85)	7:30.10	
5	Italy	Paolo Revelli (1:53.14); Raffaele Franceschi (1:51.56); Andrea Ceccarini (1:54.91); Fabrizio Rampazzo (1:50.76)	7:30.37	
6	Great Britain	Douglas Campbell (1:53.56); Philip Hubble (1:52.96); Martin Smith (1:52.69); Andrew Astbury (1:51.60)	7:30.81	
7	Australia	Graeme Brewer (1:52.57); Mark Tonelli (1:53.47); Mark Kerry (1:52.64); Ron McKeon (1:52.14)	7:30.82	
8	France	Fabien Noël (1:52.73); Marc Lazzaro (1:53.79); Dominique Petit (1:54.88); Pascal Lagat (1:54.68)	7:36.08	
