= Swimming at the 1980 Summer Olympics – Men's 1500 metre freestyle =

Men's 1500 metre freestyle at the Games of the XXII Olympiad
- Venue: Swimming Pool at the Olimpiysky Sports Complex
- Date: 21 July (heats); 22 July (final)
- Competitors: 17 from 11 nations
- Winning time: 14:58.27 WR

Medalists
| 1st place, gold medalist(s) | | Vladimir Salnikov | Soviet Union |
| 2nd place, silver medalist(s) | | Aleksandr Chayev | Soviet Union |
| 3rd place, bronze medalist(s) | | Max Metzker | Australia |

The men's 1500 metre freestyle event at the 1980 Summer Olympics was held on 21 and 22 July at the Swimming Pool at the Olimpiysky Sports Complex. This event is noteworthy as Vladimir Salnikov became the first man to swim the 1500m freestyle under 15 minutes.

== Records ==
Prior to this competition, the existing world and Olympic records were as follows.

| World record | Brian Goodell (USA) | 15:02.40 | Montreal, Canada | 20 July 1976 |
| Olympic record | Brian Goodell (USA) | 15:02.40 | Montreal, Canada | 20 July 1976 |

The following records were established during the competition:

| Date | Event | Name | Nationality | Time | Record |
|---|---|---|---|---|---|
| 22 July | Final | Vladimir Salnikov | Soviet Union | 14:58.27 | WR |

== Results ==
=== Heats ===
| Rank | Heat | Name | Nationality | Time | Notes |
|---|---|---|---|---|---|
| 1 | 3 | Vladimir Salnikov | Soviet Union | 15:08.25 | Q |
| 2 | 3 | Rainer Strohbach | East Germany | 15:17.93 | Q |
| 3 | 2 | Aleksandr Chayev | Soviet Union | 15:20.68 | Q |
| 4 | 2 | Rafael Escalas | Spain | 15:20.99 | Q |
| 5 | 2 | Max Metzker | Australia | 15:21.63 | Q |
| 6 | 1 | Zoltán Wladár | Hungary | 15:31.06 | Q |
| 7 | 1 | Borut Petrič | Yugoslavia | 15:31.53 | Q |
| 8 | 1 | Eduard Petrov | Soviet Union | 15:32.32 | Q |
| 9 | 1 | Sándor Nagy | Hungary | 15:34.84 | |
| 10 | 2 | Daniel Machek | Czechoslovakia | 15:39.73 | |
| 11 | 3 | Simon Gray | Great Britain | 15:43.17 | |
| 12 | 3 | Darjan Petrič | Yugoslavia | 15:47.49 | |
| 13 | 3 | Andrew Astbury | Great Britain | 15:54.32 | |
| 14 | 3 | Djan Madruga | Brazil | 15:56.20 | |
| 15 | 1 | Marcelo Jucá | Brazil | 16:01.11 | |
| 16 | 1 | Diego Quiroga | Ecuador | 16:01.41 | |
| 17 | 3 | José María Larrañaga | Peru | 16:27.90 | |
| | 1 | Kevin Williamson | Ireland | DNS | |
| | 2 | Abdelhakim Bitat | Algeria | DNS | |
| | 2 | István Koczka | Hungary | DNS | |
| | 3 | Jean-Marie François | Venezuela | DNS | |

=== Final ===
| Rank | Name | Nationality | Time | Notes |
|---|---|---|---|---|
| 1st place, gold medalist(s) | Vladimir Salnikov | Soviet Union | 14:58.27 | WR |
| 2nd place, silver medalist(s) | Aleksandr Chayev | Soviet Union | 15:14.30 | |
| 3rd place, bronze medalist(s) | Max Metzker | Australia | 15:14.49 | |
| 4 | Rainer Strohbach | East Germany | 15:15.29 | |
| 5 | Borut Petrič | Yugoslavia | 15:21.78 | |
| 6 | Rafael Escalas | Spain | 15:21.88 | |
| 7 | Zoltán Wladár | Hungary | 15:26.70 | |
| 8 | Eduard Petrov | Soviet Union | 15:28.24 | |
