= Australia at the 1980 Summer Olympics =

- IOC code: AUS
- NOC: Australian Olympic Federation

in Moscow
- Competitors: 121 (93 men and 28 women) in 17 sports
- Flag bearers: Denise Boyd (opening); Max Metzker (opening); John Sumegi (closing)
- Medals Ranked 15th: Gold 2 Silver 2 Bronze 5 Total 9

Summer Olympics appearances (overview)
- 1896; 1900; 1904; 1908; 1912; 1920; 1924; 1928; 1932; 1936; 1948; 1952; 1956; 1960; 1964; 1968; 1972; 1976; 1980; 1984; 1988; 1992; 1996; 2000; 2004; 2008; 2012; 2016; 2020; 2024; 2028

Other related appearances
- 1906 Intercalated Games –––– Australasia (1908–1912)

Australia competed at the 1980 Summer Olympics in Moscow, USSR. In partial support of the American-led boycott of the 1980 Summer Olympics, Australia competed under the Olympic Flag. 121 competitors, 93 men and 28 women, took part in 92 events in 17 sports.

For the first time in the Olympics history, there were two flag bearers, Denise Boyd (athletics) and Max Metzker (swimming), Australia's first joint-flag carriers, carried the Olympic flag in the opening ceremony instead of the national flag. Countries marched in order of the Russian alphabet, and Australia was therefore second in the parade of nations, following Greece, which has traditionally led the march since 1928.

Athletes who competed at the Games were formally recognized by the Australian Government on July 30, 2025.

== Medalists ==
Medal	Name	Sport	Event	Date
Gold	Michelle Ford	Swimming	Women's 800 metre freestyle	26 July
Gold	Mark Kerry; Peter Evans; Mark Tonelli; Neil Brooks; Glenn Patching (heat)	Swimming	Men's 4 x 100 metre medley relay	24 July
Silver	Rick Mitchell	Athletics	Men's 400 metre	30 July
Silver	John Sumegi	Canoeing	Men's K-1 500 metres	1 August
Bronze	Michelle Ford	Swimming	Women's 200 metre butterfly	24 July
Bronze	Graeme Brewer	Swimming	Men's 200 metre freestyle	21 July
Bronze	Max Metzker	Swimming	Men's 1500 metre freestyle	22 July
Bronze	Peter Evans	Swimming	Men's 100 metre breaststroke	22 July
Bronze	Mark Kerry	Swimming	Men's 200 metre backstroke	26 July

== Competitors ==
Sport	Men	Women	Total
Archery	1	2	3
Athletics	14	7	21
Basketball	12	-	12
Boxing	2	–	2
Canoeing	5	-	5
Cycling	11	-	11
Diving	1	2	3
Fencing	1	2	3
Gymnastics	1	2	3
Judo	3	-	3
Modern pentathlon	1	–	1
Rowing	11	5	16
Shooting	1	1	2
Swimming	10	7	17
Water polo	11	–	11
Weightlifting	5	–	5
Wrestling	3	–	3
Total	93	28	121

== Archery ==
In the third Olympic archery competition that Australia contested, the nation sent two women and one man.
Officials: Section Manager - Keith Gaisford

== Men ==
Rank	Archer	Round 1 Score	Round 1 Rank	Round 2 Score	Round 2 Rank	Total Score
26	Scott Dumbrell	1142	27	1129	25	2271

== Women ==
Rank	Archer	Round 1 Score	Round 1 Rank	Round 2 Score	Round 2 Rank	Total Score
9	Terene Donovan	1172	10	1171	10	2343
15	Carole Toy	1123	17	1162	14	2285

== Athletics ==
Officials: Section Manager - Ray Durie, Chief Coach - John Daly, Coach - Jean Roberts, Coach - Pat Clohessy

Men
Track and road events

Athlete	Event	Heats		Quarterfinal		Semifinal		Final	
Athlete	Event	Result	Rank	Result	Rank	Result	Rank	Result	Rank
Rick Mitchell	400 metres	46.63	3 Q	45.73	1 Q	45.48	2 Q	44.84	2nd place, silver medalist(s)
David Fitzsimons	5000 metres	13:46.4	7 Q	-		13:58.3	10	Did not advance	
Steve Austin	5000 metres	13:43.2	6 Q	-		13:47.6	11	Did not advance	
Steve Austin	5000 metres	29:45.2	5	Did not advance					
Bill Scott	5000 metres	28:58.70	3 Q	—N/a				28:15.08	9
Rob de Castella	Marathon	—N/a						2:14:31	10
Chris Wardlaw	Marathon	—N/a						2:20:42	28
Gerard Barrett	Marathon	—N/a						DNF	
David Smith	20 kilometres walk	—N/a						DSQ	
David Smith	50 kilometres walk	—N/a						DNF	
Willi Sawall	50 kilometres walk	—N/a						4:08:25	8

Field events

Athlete	Event	Qualification		Final	
Athlete	Event	Distance	Position	Distance	Position
Gary Honey	Long jump	7.44	23	Did not advance	
Ian Campbell	Triple jump	17.02	1 Q	16.72	5
Ken Lorraway	Triple jump	16.80	2 Q	16.44	8
Peter Farmer	Hammer throw	69.16	13	Did not advance	

Combined events – Decathlon

Athlete	100 metres	Long jump	Shot put	High jump	400 m	110 m hurdles	Discus throw	Pole vault	Javelin throw	1500 metres	Final	Rank
Peter Hadfield	11.04	7.36	13.34	1.85	50.37	15.69w	48.02	4.60	58.12	4:51.2	7709	13

Women
Track and road events

Athlete	Event	Heats		Quarterfinal		Semifinal		Final	
Athlete	Event	Result	Rank	Result	Rank	Result	Rank	Result	Rank
Denise Boyd	100 metres	11.56	2 Q	11.35	4 Q	11.44	8	Did not advance	
Debbie Wells	100 metres	11.72	5 q	11.66	7	Did not advance			
Denise Boyd	200 metres	23.36	8 Q	22.91	8 Q	22.80	3 Q	22.76	7
Penelope Gillies	100 metres hurdles	13.68	6	Did not advance					

Field events

Athlete	Event	Qualification		Final	
Athlete	Event	Distance	Position	Distance	Position
Christine Stanton	High jump	1.88	10 Q	1.91	6
Pam Matthews	Javelin throw	55.72	7	Did not advance	
Petra Rivers	Javelin throw	55.80	9	Did not advance	
Gael Mulhall	Shot put	—N/a		18.00	12
Gael Mulhall	Discus	54.90	15	Did not advance	

== Basketball ==
Men's Team Competition

Offivccials - Section Manager - Robert Staunton, Coach - Lindsay Gaze, Assistant Coach - Alan Dawe

Team	Event	Preliminary round Group C				Classification round				
Team	Event	Opposition Score	Opposition Score	Opposition Score	Rank	Opposition Score	Opposition Score	Opposition Score	Opposition Score	Rank
Australia	Men's tournament	Cuba; L 76-83	Italy; W 84-77	Sweden; W 64-55	8	Czech Republic; W 91-86	Poland; L 74-101	Senegal; W 94-65	India; W 93-75	8

- Team Roster:
  - Peter Ali
  - Stephen Breheny
  - Perry Crosswhite
  - Mel Dalgleish
  - Ian Davies
  - Gordon McLeod
  - Danny Morseau
  - Les Riddle
  - Larry Sengstock
  - Phil Smyth
  - Michael Tucker
  - Peter Walsh

== Boxing ==
Officials: Section Manager - Arthur Tunstall

Athlete	Event	Round of 32	Round of 16	Quarterfinals	Semifinals	Final	
Athlete	Event	Opposition Result	Opposition Result	Opposition Result	Opposition Result	Opposition Result	Rank
Norman Stevens	Lightweight	Tumbas (YUG); L 1-4	Did not advance				
Benny Pike	Light heavyweight	—N/a	Wamba (CGO); W RT	Bauch (GDR); L KO	Did not advance		

== Canoeing ==
Officials: Section Manager - Zoltan Sziegeti, Coach - Reg Hatch

Men

Athlete	Event	Heats		Repechage		Semifinals		Final	
Athlete	Event	Time	Rank	Time	Rank	Time	Rank	Time	Rank
John Sumegi	K-1 500 metres	1:44.45	1 QS	Bye		1:46.11	1	1:44.12	2nd place, silver medalist(s)
Barry Kelly, Robert Lee	K-4 500 metres	1:36.31	2 QS	Bye		1:36.63	2 QF	1:36.45	5
Barry Kelly, Robert Lee, Ken Vidler, Crosbie Baulch	K-4 1000 metres	3:10.49	3 QF	—N/a		—N/a		3:19.87	8

== Cycling ==
Officials: Section Manager - Les Dunn, Track Coach - Charlie Walsh, Road Coach - John Hardaker

=== Road - Men ===
Athlete	Event	Time	Rank
Kevin Bradshaw	Road race	DNF	
Michael Wilson	Road race	at 9:10	25
Remo Sansonetti	Road race	DNF	
Graham Seers	Road race	DNF	
Kevin Bradshaw; Remo Sansonetti; David Scarfe; Michael Wilson	Team time trial	2:08:25.2	11

=== Track - Men ===
Sprint

Athlete	Event	Preliminary Round 1	Round 1 Repechage	Preliminary Round 2	Round 2 Repechage	Round of 16	Round of 16 Repechage	Quarterfinals	Semifinals	Classification 5-8	
Athlete	Event	Opposition Time	Opposition Time	Opposition Time	Opposition Time	Opposition Time	Opposition Time	Opposition Time	Opposition Time	Opposition Time	Rank
Kenrick Tucker	Sprint	Veldtkas (NED); W 11.35	Bye	Kocot (POL); W10.93	Bye	Kopyloc (URS); L	Salee (DEN) | Joseph (GUY); W11.49	Tkáč (CZE); L, L	Did not advance	Salee (DEN), Isler (SUI), Dazzan (ITA)	7

Time trial

Athlete	Event	Time	Rank
Kenrick Tucker	Time trial	1:07.709	10

Pursuit

Athlete	Event	Qualification		Quarterfinals	Semifinals	Final / BM	
Athlete	Event	Time	Rank	Opposition Time	Opposition Time	Opposition Time	Rank
Kevin Poole	Individual pursuit	4:49.71	9	Did not advance			
Colin Fitzgerald; Kevin Nichols; Gary Sutton; Kelvin Poole	Team pursuit	4:21.76	8 Q	Soviet Union; L 4:22.02	Did not advance		

Note - Michael Turtur did not compete in 4000m team pursuit due to illness.

== Diving ==
Officials: Coach - Ian Nicholls

Men

Athlete	Event	Qualification		Final	
Athlete	Event	Points	Rank	Points	Rank
Steve Foley	3 m springboard	521.82	11	Did not advance	
Steve Foley	10 m platform	427.44	16	Did not advance	

Women

Athlete	Event	Preminary		Final		Total	
Athlete	Event	Points	Rank	Points	Rank	Points	Rank
Jenny Donnet	3 m springboard	376.77	18	Did not advance			
Valerine McFarlane	3 m springboard	413.97	7	444.060	6	651.045	6
Jenny Donnet	10 m platform	264.00	17	Did not advance			
Valerine McFarlane	10 m platform	333.57	7	333.000	7	499.785	7

== Fencing ==
Officials: Section Manager - Neil Archibald

Men

Athlete	Event	Round 1			Round 2			Elimination			Final		
Athlete	Event	Won	Lost	Rank	Won	Lost	Rank	Won	Lost	Rank	Won	Lost	Rank
Greg Benko	Men's épée	4	1	2Q	2	3	5	Did not advance					17
Greg Benko	Men's foil	3	1	=1 Q	2	3	4 Q	0	1	Did not advance			9

Women

Athlete	Event	Round 1			Round 2			Elimination			Final		
Athlete	Event	Won	Lost	Rank	Won	Lost	Rank	Won	Lost	Rank	Won	Lost	Rank
Mitzi Ferguson	Women's foil	2	2	3Q	0	5	6	Did not advance					22
Helen Smith	Women's foil	2	3	Did not advance									25

== Gymnastics ==
Officials: Section Manager - Frances Thompson

Men

Rank	Gymnast	Prelim	1/2 Prelim	Floor	Pommel horse	Rings	Vault	Parallel bars	Horizontal bar	Final	Total
34	Lindsay Nylund	109.15	54.575	8.800	8.600	9.350	9.700	8.950	9.700	55.100	109.675

Women

Rank	Gymnast	Prelim	Vault	Uneven bars	Balance beam	Floor	Final	Total
32	Marina Sulicich	35.800	8.700	8.750	7.550	8.900	33.900	69.700
33	Kerry Bayliss	35.275	8.500	8.150	8.950	8.600	34.200	69.475

== Judo ==
Officials: Section Manager - John Rodda

Athlete	Event	Round of 32	Round of 16	Quarterfinals	Semifinals	Final	
Athlete	Event	Opposition Result	Opposition Result	Opposition Result	Opposition Result	Opposition Result	Rank
Michael Young	Half Lightweight	Mwahza (ZAM); W	Reissmann (GDR); L	Did not advance			=13
Michael Picken	Lightweight	Adams (GBR); L'	Did not advance				=7
Mark Carew	Middleweight	Kurczyna (POL); L	—N/a	Did not advance			=19

== Modern pentathlon ==
Officials: Section Manager - Howard Edmunds

Men

Rank	Athlete	Rid.	Fen.	Sho.	Swi.	Run.	Score
37	Robert Barrie	1062	610	846	1124	1054	4696

== Rowing ==
Officials: Section Manager - John Boultbee, Chief Coach & Men's Pair - Reinhold Batschi, Coach Men's Eight - Paul Dane, Coach Women's Four - David Palfreyman

Men

Athlete	Event	Heats		Repechage		Semifinals		Final	
Athlete	Event	Time	Rank	Time	Rank	Time	Rank	Time	Rank
Robert Lang; John Bolt	Coxless pair	7:50.05	5	7:13.24	3	5:56.74	6	6:59.13	10

Athlete	Event	Semifinals		Repechage		Final	
Athlete	Event	Time	Rank	Time	Rank	Time	Rank
Islay Lee; Steve Handley; Bill Dankbaar; Andrew Withers; Tim Willoughby; James Lowe; Tim Young; Brian Richardson David England	Eight	6:05.12	4	5:45.04	2	5:56.74	6

Women

Athlete	Event	Heat		Repechage		Final	
Athlete	Event	Time	Rank	Time	Rank	Time	Rank
Anne Chirnside; Verna Westwood; Pam Westendorf; Sally Harding; Susie Palfreyman	Coxed four	3:34.08	3	3:26.77	3	3:26.37	5

== Shooting ==
Officials: Section Manager - Bob Hemery

Mixed

Athlete	Event	Final	
Athlete	Event	Score	Rank
Yvonne Hill	50 m rifle, prone	596	11
David Hollister	50 m rifle, prone	595	15

== Swimming ==
Officials: Section Manager- Peter Bowen Pain, Coach - Bill Sweetenham, Coach Joe King

Men

Athlete	Event	Heat		Semifinal		Final	
Athlete	Event	Time	Rank	Time	Rank	Time	Rank
Graeme Brewer	100 metre freestyle	52.59	16 Q	51.91	8	52.22	8
Neil Brooks	100 metre freestyle	51.11	8 Q	52.70	14	Did not advance	
Mark Tonelli	100 metre freestyle	52.04	4 Q	52.17	10	Did not advance	
Graeme Brewer	200 metre freestyle	1:51.92	3 Q	—N/a		1:51.60	3rd place, bronze medalist(s)
Ron McKeon	200 metre freestyle	1:52.66	7 Q	—N/a		1:52.60	6
Graeme Brewer	400 metre freestyle	3:57.19	9	—N/a		Did not advance	
Ron McKeon	400 metre freestyle	3:56.77	6 Q	—N/a		3:57.00	8
Max Metzker	400 metre freestyle	3:56.42	4 Q	—N/a		3:56.87	7
Max Metzker	1500 metre freestyle	15:21.63	4 Q	—N/a		15:14.49	3rd place, bronze medalist(s)
Mark Kerry	100 metre backstroke	58.08	7 Q	58.07	9	Did not advance	
Glenn Patching	100 metre backstroke	58.30	9 Q	1:00.31	16	Did not advance	
Mark Tonelli	100 metre backstroke	2:03.60	3 Q	57.89	3 Q	57.98	7
Mark Kerry	200 metre backstroke	58.08	7 Q	—N/a		2:03.14	3rd place, bronze medalist(s)
Paul Moorfoot	200 metre backstroke	2:04.87	8 Q	—N/a		2:06.15	8
Mark Tonelli	200 metre backstroke	2:07.04	15	—N/a		Did not advance	
Peter Evans	100 metre breaststroke	1:04.55	4 Q	—N/a		1:03.96	3rd place, bronze medalist(s)
Lindsay Spencer	100 metre breaststroke	1:04.78	6 Q	—N/a		1:05.04	6
Peter Evans	200 metre breaststroke	2:26.62	12	—N/a		Did not advance	
Lindsay Spencer	200 metre breaststroke	2:21.08	4 Q	—N/a		2:19.68	5
Paul Moorfoot	200 metre butterfly	2:05.69	15	—N/a		Did not advance	
Paul Moorfoot	400 metre individual medley	4:34.28	16	—N/a		Did not advance	
Mark Tonelli; Mark Kerry; Graeme Brewer; Ron McKeon; Max Metzker (heat)	4 x 200 metre freestyle relay	7:34.06	4 Q	—N/a		7:30.82	7
Mark Kerry; Peter Evans; Mark Tonelli; Neil Brooks; Glenn Patching (heat)	4 x 100 metre medley relay	3:48.94	2 Q	—N/a		3:45.70	1st place, gold medalist(s)

Women

Athlete	Event	Heat		Semifinal		Final	
Athlete	Event	Time	Rank	Time	Rank	Time	Rank
Michelle Pearson	100 metre freestyle	58.90	13	—N/a		Did not advance	
Rosemary Brown	100 metre freestyle	59.35	16	—N/a		Did not advance	
Rosemary Brown	200 metre freestyle	2:04.59	10	—N/a		Did not advance	
Karen Van der Graaf	200 metre freestyle	2:06.06	16	—N/a		Did not advance	
Rosemary Brown	400 metre freestyle	4:21.36	13	—N/a		Did not advance	
Michelle Ford	400 metre freestyle	4:13.90	3 Q	—N/a		4:11.65	4
Rosemary Brown	800 metre freestyle	8:49.47	9	—N/a		Did not advance	
Michelle Ford	800 metre freestyle	8:42.36	3 Q	—N/a		8:28.90 OR	1st place, gold medalist(s)
Lisa Forrest	200 metre backstroke	2:15.40	3 Q	—N/a		2:16.75	7
Georgina Parkes	200 metre backstroke	2:17.78	10	—N/a		Did not advance	
Lisa Curry	200 metre breaststroke	2:39.42	14	—N/a		Did not advance	
Lisa Curry	100 metre butterfly	1:02.92	8 Q	—N/a		1:02.40	5
Karen Ramsay	100 metre butterfly	1:03.62	13	—N/a		Did not advance	
Michelle Ford	200 metre butterfly	2:12.72	1 Q	—N/a		2:11.66	3rd place, bronze medalist(s)
Karen Ramsay	200 metre butterfly	2:17.82	11	—N/a		Did not advance	
Lisa Curry	400 metre individual medley	5:01.58	11	—N/a		Did not advance	
Lisa Curry; Karen Van de Graaf; Rosemary Brown; Michelle Pearson	4 x 100 metre freestyle relay	3:56.24	5 Q	—N/a		3:54.16	5
Lisa Forrest; Lisa Curry; Karen Van de Graaf; Rosemary Brown	4 x 100 metre medley relay	4:23.33	6 Q	—N/a		4:19.90	6

== Water polo ==
Officials: Manager - John Whitehouse, Coach - Tom Hoad

Men's Team Competition

Team	Preliminary round				7-12 Placing						
Team	Opposition Score	Opposition Score	Opposition Score	Rank	Opposition Score	Opposition Score	Opposition Score	Opposition Score	Opposition Score	Opposition Score	Rank
Australia men's	(Bulgaria) Bulgaria; W 9-5	(Cuba) Cuba; L 4-6	(Socialist Federal Republic of Yugoslavia) Yugoslavia; L 2-9	8	Bulgaria; W 8-5	Romania; 4-4	Greece; W 4-2	(Netherlands) Netherlands; W 7–3	Sweden; W 9-4	Italy; W 5-4	7

- Team Roster
  - Michael Turner
  - David Neesham
  - Robert Bryant
  - Peter Montgomery
  - Julian Muspratt
  - Andrew Kerr
  - Anthony Falson
  - Charles Turner
  - Martin Callaghan
  - Randall Goff
  - Andrew Steward

== Weightlifting ==
Officials: Section Manager - Lyn Jones

Athlete	Event	Snatch	Clean & Jerk	Total	Rank
Lorenzo Orsini	Bantamweight	95	125	220	16
Bill Stellois	Lightweight	122.5	160	282.5	11
Robert Kabbas	Lightweight	142.5	-	-	DNF
Luigi Fratangelo	Middle-Heavyweight	142.5	-	-	DNF
Don Mitchell	Heavyweight II	162.5	190	352.5	7

== Wrestling ==
Officials: Section Manager - Sam Parker

Athlete	Event	Round 1	Round 2	Round 3	Round 4	Round 5	Final	
Athlete	Event	Opposition Result	Opposition Result	Opposition Result	Opposition Result	Opposition Result	Opposition Result	Rank
Cris Brown	Men's freestyle 57 kg	Li H-P (PRK); L	Kończak (POL); L	Did not advance				
Zsigmond Kelevitz	Men's freestyle 68 kg	Sjdiu) (YUG); L	Rauhala (FIN); L	Did not advance				
Mick Pikos	Men's freestyle 90 kg	Biloa (CMR); W	Singh (IND); W	Aleksander Cichoń (POL); L	Tserentogtokh (MGL); L	Did not advance		8

== Administration ==
Officials: General Manager and Chef de Mission - Phil Coles, Assistant General Manager - Jim Barry, Administration Director - John Coates, Secretary-General - Julius 'Judy' Patching

== Australian Government Boycott Request ==
The Fraser government lobbied the Australian Olympic Federation and national sports organisation to boycott the Moscow Olympics due to the Soviet Union invasion of Afghanistan. On 23 May 1980, the Federation voted 6–5 to attend the Games. Voting for participation: David McKenzie, Phil Coles, William 'Bill' Hoffman, Tom Blue, John Rodda, Lewis Luxton and voting against: Sydney Grange, Kevan Gosper, Julius Patching, Jack Howson and Eric McRae. The deciding vote was Lewis Luxton, an honorary International Olympic Committee member. The decision led to several selected athletes withdrawing due to personal reasons and several national sports organisations withdrawing. Australian Shooting Association decision to withdraw was successfully challenged by Yvonne Hill in court.

Australian Olympic Committee has identified 62 athletes selected that did not compete due to personal withdrawal or their national sports organisation not sending a team.

- Archery - Terry Reilly (athlete withdrew)
- Athletics - Raelene Boyle, John Higham (athletes withdrew)
- Equestrian - Mervyn Bennett, Gavin Chester, Guy Creighton, Greg Eurell, Marlane Gilchrist, Philippa Glennen, Andrew Hoy, Wayne Roycroft (national sports organisation withdrew)
- Hockey Men -Colin Batch, David Bell, Grant Boyce, Greg Browning, Richard Charlesworth, Craig Davies, Wayne Greene, Wayne Hammond, Peter Haselhurst, Jim Irvine, Treva King, Malcolm Poole, Graeme Reid, Ronald Riley, Trevor Smith, Terry Walsh
- Hockey Women - Marian Aylmore, Sharon Buchanan, Janice Davidson, Elspeth Denning, Pam Glossop, Diane Gorman, Julene Grant (Sutherland), Sandra Grant, Kym Ireland, Robyn Leggatt (Fernley), Robyn Morrison, Colleen Pearce, Janice Ramshaw (Miller), Sharyn Simpson (McCarthy), Dianne Troode
- Modern Pentathlon - Alexander Watson (athlete withdrew)
- Shooting - Eli Ellis, Ian Hale, Terry Rumbel, John Tremelling (athletes withdrew)
- Swimming - Mark Morgan, Tracey Wickham (athletes withdrew)
- Sailing - John Bertrand, Glenn Bourke, Ian Brown, Richard Coxon, Geoff Davidson, Garry Geltz, Timothy Goodwin-Dorning, Greg Johns, Brian Lewis, Peter O'Donnell, Barry Robson, Gary Sheard (national sports organisation withdrew)

House of Representatives Standing Committee on Expenditure report in 1984 identified athletes and national sports organisations that were compensated for not attending the Moscow Olympics. National sports organisations that received payments used the funding to attend other international sporting events.

Organisation	Amount
Equestrian Federation of Australia	$125,000
Australian Yachting Federation	$52,840
Australian Hockey Association (Men)	$90, 374.14
Australian Women's Hockey Association	$45,740
Amateur Boxing Union of Australia	$13,784
Australian Volleyball Federation	$120,00
Australian Shooting Association	$41,000
Total	$488,738.14

Athlete	Amount
Raelene Boyle (athletics)	$6,000
John Higham (athletics)	$6,000
Mark Morgan (swimming)	$6,000
Terry Reilly (archery)	$6,000
Alexander Watson (modern pentathlon)	$6,000
Tracey Wickham (swimming)	$6,000
Total	$36,000

On 30 July 2025, Prime Minister Anthony Albanese and Opposition Leader Sussan Ley in the House of Representatives formally acknowledged and welcomed home the 121 athletes who defied Fraser government to compete under a neutral flag at the 1980 Moscow Olympics. Athletes that were selected but did not attend were also acknowledged.

== Trivia ==
Norman May's call of the Men's 4 × 100 m Medley Relay, in which he excitedly exclaimed "Four, Three, Two, One. Gold, Gold to Australia, Gold", has become one of the most famous calls in the history of Australian sport.

== Books and Reports ==
- Australian Olympic Federation. Report of the Olympic Games 1980. Melbourne, The Federation, 1980.
- Australian Olympic Federation. Annual Report 1980, Melbourne, The Federation, 1980.
- Barry Cohen. Olympic Gold. The Author, 1980.
- Harry Gordon. Australia and the Olympic Games. Brisbane, University of Queensland Press, 1994.
- Lisa Forrest. Boycott. Sydney, ABC Books, 2008.

== See also ==
- Australia at the 1978 Commonwealth Games
- Australia at the 1982 Commonwealth Games
