= Paul Hartloff =

American swimmer (born 1958)

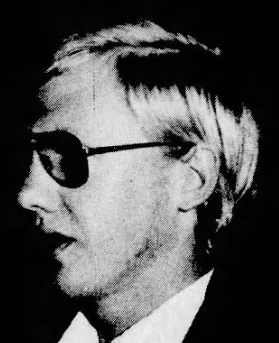
- Hartloff circa 1976

Personal information
- Full name: Paul Michael Hartloff
- National team: United States
- Born: April 5, 1958 (age 68) Berkeley, California, U.S.
- Height: 6 ft 0 in (1.83 m)
- Weight: 159 lb (72 kg)

Sport
- Sport: Swimming
- Strokes: Freestyle
- Club: Santa Barbara Swim Club
- College team: Stanford University
- Coach: James Gaughran, Skip Kenney (Stanford); Jack Simon (Santa Barbara SC)
Medal record
Men's swimming
Representing the United States
Pan American Games
| Silver medal – second place | 1975 Mexico City | 1500 m freestyle |

Paul Michael Hartloff (born April 5, 1958) is an American former competition swimmer who represented the United States at the 1976 Summer Olympics in Montreal, Quebec. Hartloff competed in the men's 1,500-meter freestyle event, but in a highly competitive year finished seventh in the final. After qualifying for the 1976 Olympics at the Olympic Trials in Long Beach, California, he set an Olympic record on July 19, 1976, in a qualifying heat for the 1,500-meter event at the 1976 Montreal Olympics in Montreal, Quebec, with a time of 15:20.74, but in a highly competitive year, his time was a full 14 seconds slower than American Olympic teammate Brian Goodell's recent standing world record of 15:06.66.

== San Marcos High swimming ==
Hartloff attended and swam for San Marcos High School under Coach Dick Macintosh. He graduated San Marcos High, in the Santa Barbara, California area, in 1976 not long before the Montreal Olympics. In March of his Junior year, swimming for San Marcos, he took a third place in the 200 Freestyle with a time of 1:44.1 at the statewide California Interscholastic Federation Championships, and placed fourth in the 500 freestyle with a 4:38.2. The 500 would later become one of Hartloff's specialty events, though he would later excel in the mile after his extensive pre-Olympic and college training. Hartloff was a Channel League Conference Champion in the 4x100-meter freestyle event with a combined time of 3:15.6 and had been swimming with two of the San Marcos High relay team members since they were eight. The Channel League consisted of about eight High Schools that competed against each other in the Santa Barbara area.

== Santa Barbara Swim club ==
During his High School years, Hartloff was coached by ASCA Hall of Fame Coach Jack Simon at the Santa Barbara Swim Club. Hartloff was swimming with a club as early as age eight, and swam with Santa Barbara at least by age 13. Showing early skills at age 14 in freestyle sprint and stroke while swimming for Santa Barbara, at the Lindsay, California Kiwannis Age Group meet in July 1972, Hartloff set a meet record in the 50-yard freestyle of 23.8, won the 200-yard freestyle in 1:53.2, and the 100-yard butterfly in 59.5. Swimming for the Santa Barbara Aquatic Association around the summer of his High School Sophomore year in July, 1973, Hartloff set a meet record of 2:06.3 in the 200-yard Butterfly, a stroke event requiring strength and endurance, at the Lindsay AAU Meet in central California. Already establishing his skills in the one mile swim at 16, he won six events at an AAU meet swimming in Atascadero, California in late April 1974 for the Santa Barbara Swim Club which included a Tri-County record time in the 1650-yard free of 16:59.1. He also won the 500 free, the 200 Backstroke, the 200 and 400 Individual Medley and the 200 freestyle.

Swimming around the age of 17, in one of his more significant performances, Hartloff took a silver in the 1500-meter freestyle at the October, 1975 Pan American Games in Mexico City with a time of 15:57.32.

== 1976 Montreal Olympics ==
=== Long Beach Olympic trials ===
Hartloff made the 1976 Olympic team by placing third at the US Olympic Trials in the 1,500-meter event in Long Beach, California. His time was 15:13.76, though teammate Brian Goodell set a World record with a 15:06.66, and American Bobby Hackett was second with a 15:12.75.

After qualifying at the 1976 Olympic Trials in Long Beach, Hartloff trained for the Olympics in Canton, Ohio with other member of the U.S. Olympic swim team.

=== Montreal Olympics ===
He set an Olympic record on July 19, 1976, in the Montreal Olympics qualifying heat with a time of 15:20.74, but it was a full 14 seconds slower than American teammate Brian Goodell's standing world record of 15:06.66, which he had just set a few weeks earlier at the Olympic trials in Long Beach. At the Montreal Olympic Final heat, Hartloff led at the 400-meter point in the 1,500, but could not maintain the lead and finished seventh with a 15:32.08. Hartloff swam a great race, but the pace for the medal contenders was exceptionally fast.

Brian Goodell won the event in a blazing fast 15:02.4, setting a new world record and a personal best time by 4 seconds. Bobby Hackett of the USA was second and Steve Holland of Australia third, both finishing the event in times under the standing World Record.

Bobby Hackett led at 800 meters, but Goodell caught Hackett at 1,350 meters, who was behind Holland. Goodell took the lead at 1,400 meters and finished strongly to win the gold comfortably.

=== Stanford University swimming ===
Hartloff later attended and swam for Stanford University, starting in 1976 and graduating in 1980. His High School Coach Dick McIntosh had graduated Stanford and may have influenced Hartloff's decision to attend. Swimming for Stanford in a defeat against PAC-8 rival University of California Los Angeles in February 1978, Hartloff won the 1650-yard free in 15:33.06, but in the losing meet, Stanford's former Olympic Gold medalist Mike Bruner won the only other event for the team. At a meet with Arizona in 1979, Hartloff took a first place in the 1000 free with a 9:22.01, and a second place in the 500 free with a 4:35.76. Stanford won the meet, but had done poorly in the highly competitive PAC-8 conference the prior year. Hampered by fierce competition from World Record holder Brian Goodell of UCLA at the PAC-8 Championships on March 3, 1979, Hartloff managed a third place in his signature Olympic event the 1500-meter with a 15:20.54, against USC's Brian Goodell whose first-place finish was a full 15 seconds faster. In 1979, Hartloff held a top time for Stanford in the 1650 and the 500 freestyle with a 4:27.70, but was second to Olympic gold medalist Mike Bruner who had swum the event in 4:26.10. Hartloff swam in the 500, 1650 freestyle, and 400 and 800 free relays at the NCAA Championships in Cleveland, in late March 1979, but against very deep competition, and despite having two Olympians and three All-Americans on the team, Stanford did not place in the top ten at the NCAA's that year, though they did manage a 5-4 dual meet record. At Stanford, Hartloff was coached by James Gaughran and in his Senior year by Hall of Fame Coach Skip Kenney.

In 2008, he worked as an Engineer for a company in Goleta, California that made Endoscopes.
