= Sergey Kostygov =

Russian swimming coach

Sergei Mikhailovich Kostygov
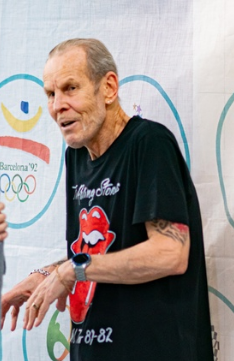
- Coaching in progress
- Born: May 27, 1950 (age 75); Leningrad, Soviet Union
- Education: Lesgaft National State University of Physical Education, Sport and Health
- Occupation: Swimming coach
- Years active: 1971–present
- Known for: Coaching Aleksandr Chayev, Igor Marchenko, Anna Nikitina, Aleksandr Shilin
- Awards: Honored Coach of Russia
- Website: VK Community

Sergei Mikhailovich Kostygov (Russian: Сергей Михайлович Костыгов; born May 27, 1950, Leningrad) is a Soviet and Russian swimming coach. Honored Coach of Russia, he has trained 8 Masters of Sport of International Class, and numerous champions and medalists at the Championships of the USSR and Russia, World Cups, Goodwill Games, and European Championships. Sergei Mikhailovich has been named one of the top 25 coaches in the USSR and Russia 13 times.

== Biography ==
Sergei Mikhailovich Kostygov graduated from the Lesgaft National State Institute of Physical Culture in 1971, receiving a sports and pedagogical education.

In 1971, he began his coaching career at the "Ekran" sports school in Leningrad (now Saint Petersburg), having been invited by Igor Mikhailovich Koshkin. After working in Kharkiv (1980-1983), where he coached at the "Ekho" Olympic training center, he returned to Leningrad. Since 2008, he has been working as a coach and instructor at the Sports school "Ekran" (Saint Petersburg). His pedagogical experience spans over 50 years.

Over the years, he has trained dozens of Masters of Sports of the USSR and Russia. His students have become prize-winners and winners of all-Russian and international competitions. Kostygov has made a significant contribution to the development of the Leningrad/Saint Petersburg swimming school. Among his well-known students is Aleksandr Chayev, a silver medalist at the 1980 Olympic Games.

In his youth, Sergei Kostygov himself achieved the standard of Candidate for Master of Sport of the USSR.

== Notable students ==
- Aleksandr Chayev- silver medalist at the 1980 Olympic Games.
- Anna Nikitina - silver medalist at the European Championships, two-time winner of stages of the World Cup.
- Denis Grishin - winner and multiple medalist of stages of the World Cup.
- Igor Marchenko - multiple medalist at the World Championships, multiple winner and medalist of stages of the World Cup, champion and medalist of the Universiade.
- Aleksandr Shilin - represented his adopted nation Kyrgyzstan at the 2000 Summer Olympics, and posted top-ten times in 50 m backstroke from the European and Russian Swimming Masters.

== Awards and achievements ==
- Honored Coach of Russia (2021)
- Has been named one of the top 25 coaches in the USSR and Russia 13 times.
