= Swimming at the 1980 Summer Olympics – Women's 800 metre freestyle =

Women's 800 metre freestyle at the Games of the XXII Olympiad
- Venue: Swimming Pool at the Olimpiysky Sports Complex
- Date: 26 July 1980 (heats & final)
- Competitors: 14 from 9 nations
- Winning time: 8:28.90 OR

Medalists
1st place, gold medalist(s)		Michelle Ford	Australia
2nd place, silver medalist(s)		Ines Diers	East Germany
3rd place, bronze medalist(s)		Heike Dähne	East Germany

The women's 800 metre freestyle event at the 1980 Summer Olympics was held on 26 July at the Swimming Pool at the Olimpiysky Sports Complex.

== Records ==
Prior to this competition, the existing world and Olympic records were as follows.

World record	Tracey Wickham (AUS)	8:24.62	Edmonton, Canada	5 August 1978
Olympic record	Petra Thümer (GDR)	8:37.14	Montreal, Canada	25 July 1976

The following records were established during the competition:

Date	Event	Name	Nationality	Time	Record
26 July	Heat 1	Heike Dähne	East Germany	8:36.09	OR
26 July	Final	Michelle Ford	Australia	8:28.90	OR

== Results ==
=== Heats ===
Rank	Heat	Name	Nationality	Time	Notes
1	1	Heike Dähne	East Germany	8:36.09	Q, OR
2	2	Ines Diers	East Germany	8:40.29	Q
3	2	Michelle Ford	Australia	8:42.36	Q
4	1	Irina Aksyonova	Soviet Union	8:44.42	Q
5	1	Pascale Verbauwen	Belgium	8:45.12	Q
6	1	Oksana Komissarova	Soviet Union	8:45.80	Q
7	2	Ines Geißler	East Germany	8:46.96	Q
8	1	Yelena Ivanova	Soviet Union	8:47.33	Q
9	2	Rosemary Brown	Australia	8:49.47	
10	2	Jacquelene Willmott	Great Britain	8:50.51	
11	2	Reggie de Jong	Netherlands	8:54.49	
12	1	Roberta Felotti	Italy	8:58.54	
13	2	Sofia Dara	Greece	9:02.37	
14	2	Nikole Schrepfer	Switzerland	9:15.11	
	1	Klára Gulyás	Hungary	DNS	
	1	María Pia Ayora	Peru	DNS	

=== Final ===
Rank	Name	Nationality	Time	Notes
1st place, gold medalist(s)	Michelle Ford	Australia	8:28.90	OR
2nd place, silver medalist(s)	Ines Diers	East Germany	8:32.55	
3rd place, bronze medalist(s)	Heike Dähne	East Germany	8:33.48	
4	Irina Aksyonova	Soviet Union	8:38.05	
5	Oksana Komissarova	Soviet Union	8:42:04	
6	Pascale Verbauwen	Belgium	8:44.84	
7	Ines Geißler	East Germany	8:45.28	
8	Yelena Ivanova	Soviet Union	8:46.45	
