= Swimming at the 1980 Summer Olympics – Men's 100 metre freestyle =

Men's 100 metre freestyle at the Games of the XXII Olympiad
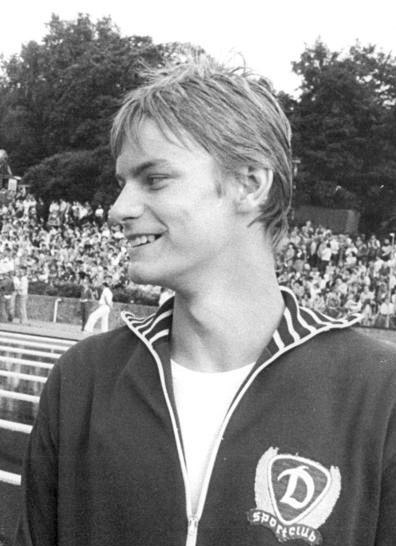
- Jörg Woithe (1979)
- Venue: Swimming Pool at the Olimpiysky Sports Complex
- Date: 26 July (heats & semifinals); 27 July (final)
- Competitors: 39 from 26 nations
- Winning time: 50.40

Medalists
1st place, gold medalist(s)		Jörg Woithe; East Germany
2nd place, silver medalist(s)		Per Holmertz; Sweden
3rd place, bronze medalist(s)		Per Johansson; Sweden

The men's 100 metre freestyle event at the 1980 Summer Olympics was held on 26 and 27 July at the Swimming Pool at the Olimpiysky Sports Complex. There were 39 competitors from 26 nations. Nations had been limited to three swimmers each since the 1924 Games (except in 1960, when the limit was two). The event was won by Jörg Woithe of East Germany, the nation's first medal in the men's 100 metre freestyle. Sweden earned its first medals in the event since 1952 with Per Holmertz's silver and Per Johansson's bronze.

== Background ==
This was the 18th appearance of the men's 100 metre freestyle. The event has been held at every Summer Olympics except 1900 (when the shortest freestyle was the 200 metres), though the 1904 version was measured in yards rather than metres.

None of the eight finalists from the 1976 Games returned. The top sprinters of the time were absent, Rowdy Gaines due to the American-led boycott and Jonty Skinner due to the ban on apartheid South Africa.

Algeria, Angola, Cyprus, Libya, Madagascar, Mozambique, and Zimbabwe each made their debut in the event. Great Britain and Hungary each made their 16th appearance, most of the nations competing in 1980, but behind the absent United States' 17 appearances.

== Competition format ==
The competition used a three-round (heats, semifinals, final) format. The advancement rule followed the format introduced in 1952, though with 2 semifinals. Swim-offs were used as necessary to break ties. A swimmer's place in the heat was not used to determine advancement; instead, the fastest times from across all heats in a round were used. There were 6 heats, with between 6 and 8 swimmers each. The top 16 swimmers advanced to the semifinals. There were 2 semifinals of 8 swimmers each. The top 8 swimmers advanced to the final.

This swimming event used freestyle swimming, which means that the method of the stroke is not regulated (unlike backstroke, breaststroke, and butterfly events). Nearly all swimmers use the front crawl or a variant of that stroke. Because an Olympic size swimming pool is 50 metres long, this race consisted of two lengths of the pool.

== Records ==
Prior to this competition, the existing world and Olympic records were as follows.

World record	Jonty Skinner (RSA)	49.44	Philadelphia, United States	14 August 1976
Olympic record	Jim Montgomery (USA)	49.99	Montreal, Canada	25 July 1976

== Schedule ==
All times are Moscow Time (UTC+3)

Date	Time	Round
Saturday, 26 July 1980	10:00; 18:30	Heats; Semifinals
Sunday, 27 July 1980	20:00	Final

== Results ==
=== Heats ===
Rank	Heat	Swimmer	Nation	Time	Notes
1	5	Jörg Woithe	East Germany	50.49	Q
2	5	Martin Smith	Great Britain	51.88	Q
3	4	Per Holmertz	Sweden	52.01	Q
4	5	Mark Tonelli	Australia	52.04	Q
5	1	Sergey Krasyuk	Soviet Union	52.08	Q
5	2	Sergey Kopliakov	Soviet Union	52.08	Q
7	4	René Écuyer	France	52.09	Q
8	3	Per Johansson	Sweden	52.11	Q
8	3	Neil Brooks	Australia	52.11	Q
10	4	Sergey Smiryagin	Soviet Union	52.21	Q
11	3	Raffaele Franceschi	Italy	52.26	Q
12	1	Per Wikström	Sweden	52.29	Q
13	2	David López-Zubero	Spain	52.43	Q
14	4	Jorge Fernandes	Brazil	52.51	Q
15	5	Cees Vervoorn	Netherlands	52.57	Q
16	3	Graeme Brewer	Australia	52.59	Q
17	4	Alberto Mestre	Venezuela	52.62	
18	2	Mark Taylor	Great Britain	52.65	
19	1	Stéfan Voléry	Switzerland	52.68	
20	1	Fabrizio Rampazzo	Italy	52.71	
21	2	Paolo Revelli	Italy	52.74	
22	5	Herwig Bayer	Austria	52.79	
23	1	Rui Abreu	Portugal	52.85	
24	2	Guy Goosen	Zimbabwe	52.87	
25	5	Frank Kühne	East Germany	52.93	
26	4	Cyro Delgado	Brazil	53.00	
27	3	Ramón Lavín	Spain	53.45	
28	3	Tsvetan Golomeev	Bulgaria	53.50	
29	2	Yulyan Vasilev	Bulgaria	53.61	
30	1	Gábor Mészáros	Hungary	54.41	
31	3	Mohamed Halimi	Algeria	55.16	
32	5	Tô Văn Vệ	Vietnam	56.75	
33	2	Lakis Fylaktou	Cyprus	57.41	
34	4	Adham Hemdan	Kuwait	58.33	
35	2	Jorge Lima	Angola	59.39	
36	1	Abdulwahab Werfeli	Libya	1:01.55	
37	1	Bilall Yamouth	Lebanon	1:03.48	
38	3	Zoë Andrianifaha	Madagascar	1:04.92	
39	5	Edgar Martins	Mozambique	1:06.17	
—	4	David Cummins	Ireland	DNS	

=== Semifinals ===
Rank	Heat	Swimmer	Nation	Time	Notes
1	2	Jörg Woithe	East Germany	50.21	Q
2	2	Per Holmertz	Sweden	51.19	Q
3	1	Per Johansson	Sweden	51.42	Q
4	2	Sergey Kopliakov	Soviet Union	51.51	Q
5	2	René Écuyer	France	51.62	Q
6	1	Sergey Krasyuk	Soviet Union	51.81	Q
7	2	Raffaele Franceschi	Italy	51.87	Q
8	1	Graeme Brewer	Australia	51.91	Q
9	1	Per Wikström	Sweden	52.15	
10	1	Mark Tonelli	Australia	52.17	
11	1	Sergey Smiryagin	Soviet Union	52.18	
11	2	David López-Zubero	Spain	52.18	
13	1	Martin Smith	Great Britain	52.41	
14	2	Neil Brooks	Australia	52.70	
15	2	Cees Vervoorn	Netherlands	52.73	
16	1	Jorge Fernandes	Brazil	52.91	

=== Final ===
Rank	Swimmer	Nation	Time
1st place, gold medalist(s)	Jörg Woithe	East Germany	50.40
2nd place, silver medalist(s)	Per Holmertz	Sweden	50.91
3rd place, bronze medalist(s)	Per Johansson	Sweden	51.29
4	Sergey Kopliakov	Soviet Union	51.34
5	Raffaele Franceschi	Italy	51.69
6	Sergey Krasyuk	Soviet Union	51.80
7	René Écuyer	France	52.01
8	Graeme Brewer	Australia	52.22
