= Swimming at the 1980 Summer Olympics – Women's 200 metre butterfly =

Women's 200 metre butterfly at the Games of the XXII Olympiad
- Venue: Swimming Pool at the Olimpiysky Sports Complex
- Date: 21 July 1980 (heats & final)
- Competitors: 21 from 14 nations
- Winning time: 2:10.44 OR

Medalists
| 1st place, gold medalist(s) | | Ines Geißler | East Germany |
| 2nd place, silver medalist(s) | | Sybille Schönrock | East Germany |
| 3rd place, bronze medalist(s) | | Michelle Ford | Australia |

The women's 200 metre butterfly event at the 1980 Summer Olympics was held on 21 July at the Swimming Pool at the Olimpiysky Sports Complex.

== Records ==
Prior to this competition, the existing world and Olympic records were as follows.

| World record | Mary Meagher (USA) | 2:07.01 | Fort Lauderdale, United States | 3 September 1979 |
| Olympic record | Andrea Pollack (GDR) | 2:11.41 | Montreal, Canada | 19 July 1976 |

The following records were established during the competition:

| Date | Event | Name | Nationality | Time | Record |
|---|---|---|---|---|---|
| 24 July | Final | Ines Geißler | East Germany | 2:10.44 | OR |

== Results ==
=== Heats ===
| Rank | Heat | Name | Nationality | Time | Notes |
|---|---|---|---|---|---|
| 1 | 3 | Michelle Ford | Australia | 2:12.72 | Q |
| 2 | 2 | Ines Geißler | East Germany | 2:13.23 | Q |
| 3 | 1 | Sybille Schönrock | East Germany | 2:13.68 | Q |
| 4 | 3 | Andrea Pollack | East Germany | 2:13.88 | Q |
| 5 | 1 | Dorota Brzozowska | Poland | 2:14.74 | Q |
| 6 | 1 | Ann Osgerby | Great Britain | 2:15.17 | Q |
| 7 | 3 | Alla Grishchenkova | Soviet Union | 2:16.01 | Q |
| 8 | 2 | Agneta Mårtensson | Sweden | 2:16.41 | Q |
| 9 | 1 | Eva Miklósfalvi | Hungary | 2:17.32 | |
| 10 | 2 | Cinzia Savi Scarponi | Italy | 2:17.53 | |
| 11 | 2 | Karen Ramsay | Australia | 2:17.82 | |
| 12 | 3 | Sonja Hausladen | Austria | 2:17.88 | |
| 13 | 1 | Larisa Polivoda | Soviet Union | 2:17.99 | |
| 14 | 2 | Janet Osgerby | Great Britain | 2:18.01 | |
| 15 | 3 | Armi Airaksinen | Sweden | 2:19.39 | |
| 16 | 3 | Małgorzata Różycka | Poland | 2:19.70 | |
| 17 | 2 | Maria Paris | Costa Rica | 2:21.14 | |
| 18 | 3 | Wilma van Velsen | Netherlands | 2:21.81 | |
| 19 | 1 | Carole Brook | Switzerland | 2:24.82 | |
| 20 | 2 | Marion Michel | Belgium | 2:25.10 | |
| 21 | 1 | Celeste García | Peru | 2:26.07 | |

=== Final ===
| Rank | Name | Nationality | Time | Notes |
|---|---|---|---|---|
| 1st place, gold medalist(s) | Ines Geißler | East Germany | 2:10.44 | OR |
| 2nd place, silver medalist(s) | Sybille Schönrock | East Germany | 2:10.45 | |
| 3rd place, bronze medalist(s) | Michelle Ford | Australia | 2:11.66 | |
| 4 | Andrea Pollack | East Germany | 2:12.13 | |
| 5 | Dorota Brzozowska | Poland | 2:14.12 | |
| 6 | Ann Osgerby | Great Britain | 2:14.83 | |
| 7 | Agneta Mårtensson | Sweden | 2:15.22 | |
| 8 | Alla Grishchenkova | Soviet Union | 2:15.70 | |
