= Eefting =

Eefting is a surname. Notable people with the surname include:

- Fred Eefting (born 1959), Dutch swimmer
- Roy Eefting (born 1989), Dutch road and track cyclist
- Bas Eefting (born 1982), Dutch athlete
