= Dähne =

Dähne or Daehne is a German surname. Notable people with the surname include:

- Heike Dähne (born 1961), German former swimmer
- Helmut Dähne (born 1944), German former motorcycle racer
- Paul-Heinrich Dähne (1921–1945), German Luftwaffe military aviator
- Sabine Dähne (born 1950), German rower
- Thomas Dähne (born 1994), German footballer who plays as a goalkeeper
