= Michael Ker =

Canadian swimmer

Personal information
- Born: 21 July 1957 (age 69) Vancouver, British Columbia, Canada

Sport
- Sport: Swimming

Michael Ker (born 21 July 1957) is a Canadian former swimmer. He competed in the men's 1500 metre freestyle at the 1976 Summer Olympics.
