= Sándor Wladár =

Hungarian swimmer

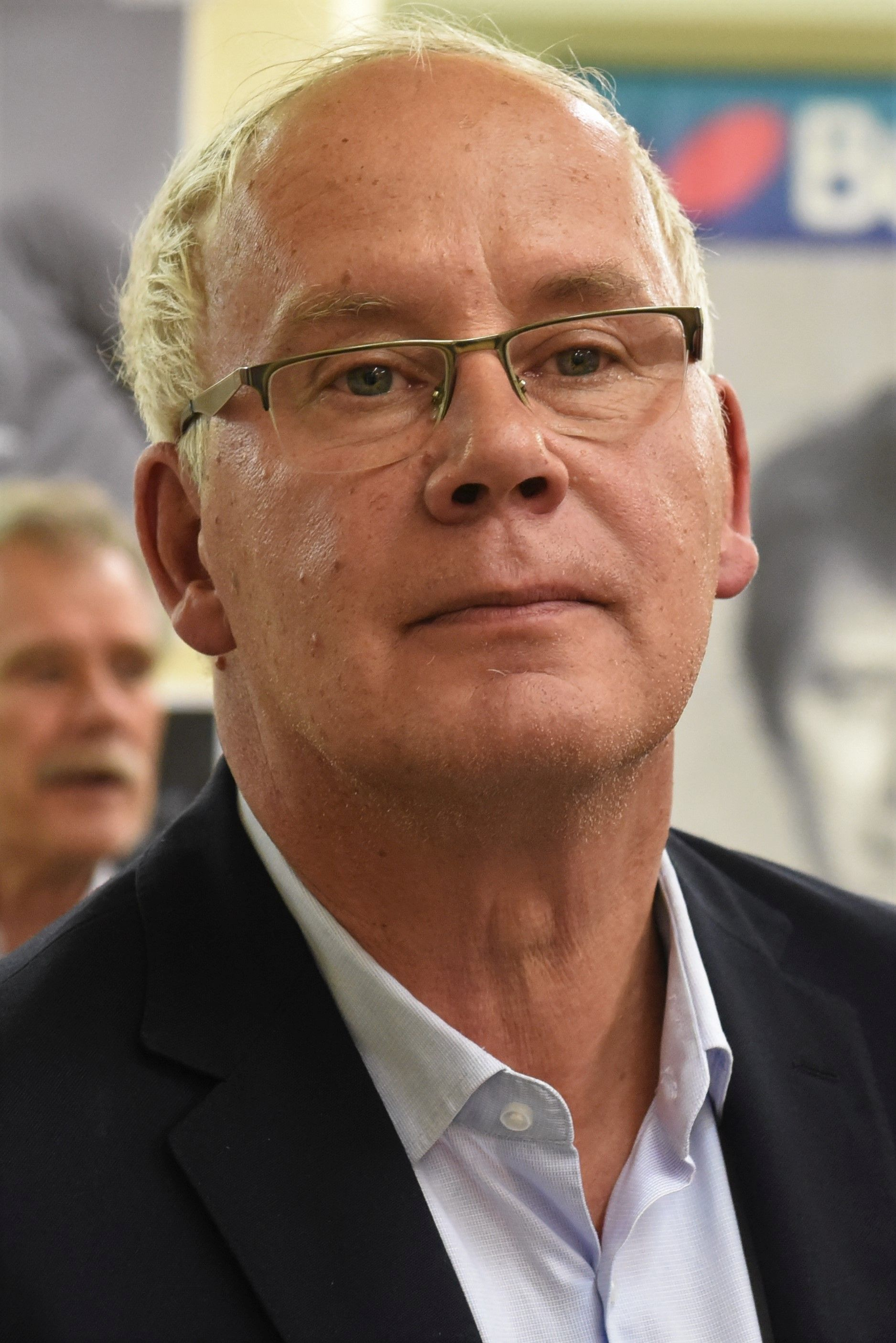

Personal information
- Full name: Wladár Sándor
- Nationality: Hungarian
- Born: 19 July 1963 (age 62) Budapest, Hungarian People's Republic
- Height: 1.84 m (6 ft 0 in)
- Weight: 78 kg (172 lb)

Sport
- Sport: Swimming
- Strokes: Backstroke
- Club: Központi Sportiskola; Újpesti Dózsa
Medal record
Men's swimming
Representing Hungary
Olympic Games
Gold medal – first place	1980 Moscow	200 m backstroke
World Championships (LC)
Silver medal – second place	1982 Guayaquil	200 m backstroke
European Championships (LC)
Gold medal – first place	1981 Split	100 m backstroke
Gold medal – first place	1981 Split	200 m backstroke
Silver medal – second place	1983 Rome	200 m backstroke
European Junior Championships (LC)
Gold medal – first place	1978 Florence	100 m backstroke
Gold medal – first place	1978 Florence	200 m backstroke
Bronze medal – third place	1978 Florence	200 m medley

Sándor Wladár (born 19 July 1963 in Budapest) is a Hungarian retired male swimmer. He won the gold medal at the 1980 Summer Olympics in Moscow in 200 m backstroke.

Wladár was a swimmer of Központi Sportiskola (1972–1980), Újpesti Dózsa (1981–1985). From 1985 to 1987 he was a water polo player for Újpesti Dózsa.

He was named the Male European Swimmer of the Year in 1981 by Swimming World magazine. The same year he was elected Hungarian Sportsman of the year.

After retiring from active sport he opened a veterinarian clinic with his brother Zoltán who was also a swimmer.

Wladár was elected president of the Hungarian Swimming Association (MÚSZ) on 24 September 2017.

== Achievements ==
- World Championships
  - Silver medal in 1982 (200 m backstroke)
- European Championships
  - Gold medal in 1981 (100 m backstroke)
  - Gold medal in 1981 (200 m backstroke)
  - Silver Medal in 1983 (200 m backstroke)

Awards
Preceded by Zoltán Magyar	Hungarian Sportsman of The Year; 1981	Succeeded by Jenő Pap
Preceded by Vladimir Salnikov	European Swimmer of the Year; 1981	Succeeded by Michael Groß
