= Lakis Fylaktou =

Cypriot swimmer (born 1964)

Personal information
- Full name: Charalampos Fylaktou
- Nickname: Laris Fylaktou
- Nationality: Cypriot
- Born: 28 January 1964 (age 62) Limassol, Cyprus

Sport
- Sport: Swimming
- Strokes: Freestyle, backstroke

Charalampos ("Lakis"/"Laris"/"Larrys") Fylaktou (also Phylactou; Greek: Χαράλαμπος (Λάκης/Λάρης) Φυλακτού; born 28 January 1964) is a Cypriot swimmer.

He competed in two events at the 1980 Summer Olympics at the age of 16. At the 1980 Summer Olympics, Fylaktou competed in the Men's 100 m freestyle and the Men's 100 m backstroke events. In the Men's 100 m freestyle event, Fylaktou was entered into heat two. He finished 7th of 8 swimmers beating only Angola's Jorge Lima with a time of 57.41 seconds. In the Men's 100 m backstroke, Fylaktou finished 7th out of 7 swimmers with a time of 1:08.92 seconds.
