= Pascal Lagat =

French swimmer

Pascal Laget
Personal information
- Nationality: French
- Born: 2 January 1960 (age 66)

Sport
- Sport: Swimming

Pascal Laget (born 2 January 1960) is a French swimmer. He competed in the men's 4 × 200 metre freestyle relay at the 1980 Summer Olympics.
