= Krasimir Tumanov =

Bulgarian swimmer

Personal information
- Born: 13 October 1961 (age 64)

Sport
- Sport: Swimming

Krasimir Tumanov (Bulgarian: Красимир Туманов; born 13 October 1961) is a Bulgarian swimmer. He competed in the men's 4 × 200 metre freestyle relay at the 1980 Summer Olympics. He was a national champion, Balkan champion, and won Bulgaria's first swimming medal at the European Championships.
