= Larisa Polivoda =

Former Ukrainian swimmer

Personal information
- Born: December 16, 1963 (age 62)

Sport
- Sport: Swimming
- Strokes: Butterfly

Larisa Polivoda (Ukrainian: Лариса Поливода; Russian: Лариса Поливода; born December 16, 1963) is a former Ukrainian butterfly swimmer who competed for the former Soviet Union at the 1980 Summer Olympics, competing in the 100 metre and 200 metre events.

She was a member of Meteor Sport Club in the city of Dnipropetrovsk.

Polivoda representеd USSR at the 1979 Tokyo World Cup, and in international meets with USA, UK, and East Germany. She became a National Champion in 1980 and 1981. Her butterfly style was distinguished by extremely fast beginning and seemingly effortless technique.
