= Paul Nash (Australian swimmer) =

Australian swimmer

Personal information
- Born: 16 October 1959 (age 66) Ealing, London, England

Sport
- Sport: Swimming
- Strokes: freestyle

Paul Stuart Nash (born 16 October 1959) is an Australian former swimmer. He competed in the men's 1500 metre freestyle at the 1976 Summer Olympics.
