= Ivar Stukolkin =

Estonian swimmer (born 1960)

Personal information
- Born: 13 August 1960 (age 65) Tallinn, then part of Estonian SSR, Soviet Union
Medal record
Men's swimming
Representing the Soviet Union
Olympic Games
Gold medal – first place	1980 Moscow	4×200 m freestyle
Bronze medal – third place	1980 Moscow	400 m freestyle
World Championships
Silver medal – second place	1982 Guayaquil	4×200 m freestyle

Ivar Stukolkin (born 13 August 1960) is a retired Estonian swimmer. He is an Olympic champion in swimming.

== Achievements ==
Besides two Olympic medals Stukolkin won a silver medal at the 1982 World Championships (4×200 m freestyle relay). He has been Soviet Union champion once in 1978 and has won sixteen titles in Estonian SSR.

== Records ==
Stukolkin set 32 Estonian national records. His 1980 national record in 400 metre freestyle swimming 3.53,95 stood 39 years until it was broken in 2019.

== Bibliography ==
- Evans, Hilary; Gjerde, Arild; Heijmans, Jeroen; Mallon, Bill; et al. "Ivar Stukolkin". Olympics at Sports-Reference.com. Sports Reference LLC. Archived from the original on 2011-05-19.
- YouTube heat 400 m freestyle Olympic Games -80
