= Eduard Petrov =

Soviet swimmer

Personal information
- Born: 13 March 1963 (age 63)

Sport
- Sport: Swimming

Eduard Petrov (born 13 March 1963) is a Soviet swimmer. He competed in the men's 1500 metre freestyle at the 1980 Summer Olympics.
