= Tom Alexander (swimmer) =

Canadian swimmer

Personal information
- Born: 17 February 1958 (age 68) Thunder Bay, Ontario, Canada

Sport
- Sport: Swimming

Tom Alexander (born 17 February 1958) is a Canadian former swimmer. He competed in the men's 400 metre freestyle at the 1976 Summer Olympics.
