= Paul Sparkes =

British swimmer

Personal information
- Born: 3 August 1960 (age 65)

Sport
- Sport: Swimming

Paul William Sparkes (born 3 August 1960) is a male retired British swimmer. Sparkes competed in the men's 1500 metre freestyle at the 1976 Summer Olympics. At the ASA National British Championships he won the 1500 metres freestyle title and the 200 metres butterfly title in 1977.
