= Paul Midgley (swimmer) =

Canadian swimmer

Personal information
- Born: 5 August 1957 (age 68) Montreal, Quebec, Canada

Sport
- Sport: Swimming

Paul Midgley (born 5 August 1957) is a Canadian former swimmer. He competed in the men's 1500 metre freestyle at the 1976 Summer Olympics.
