= Dick Caine =

Australian swimming coach and sex offender (1946–2024)

Richard Arthur Caine, (Kearney) (13 February 1946 – 25 September 2024) was an Australian swimming coach and convicted pedophile. He was the head coach at Carss Park swimming pool in Sydney for more than 40 years until his retirement in 2018. In August 2024, he was convicted of 39 sexual offences committed against his female students in the 1970s and 1980s.

== Life and career ==
Caine served as the head coach at Carss Park Swimming Pool in southern Sydney for over 40 years before retiring in 2018. Throughout his 51-year tenure at the pool, he coached swimmers who represented at Olympic, World and Commonwealth games;as well as many state and national champions. This include notable athletes like Michelle Ford, Janelle Elford, Karen Phillips, Stacey Gartrell, and Michellie Jones.

In 2022, he was inducted into the Australian Marathon Swimming Hall. However, his induction was nullified a few months later after nine counts of sexual abuse were levied against him, with thirty further charges later brought against him. His case was brought at a special hearing instead of a trial due to his declining health. In August 2024, after rejecting Caine's lawyer's argument that the passage of time made his victims' testimonies unreliable, judge Paul McGuire convicted him of raping multiple underage female students in the 1970s and 1980s. The court found out that Caine had deep interest in pre-pubescent and pubescent girls and agreed to meet by 6 December in order to determine the penalty for Caine. However, he died from lung and throat cancer on 25 September 2024, at the age of 78.
