= Michelle Ford =

Australian swimmer (born 1962)

Michelle Ford MBE
Personal information
- Full name: Michelle Jan Ford
- National team: Australia
- Born: 15 July 1962 (age 63) Sydney
- Height: 1.59 m (5 ft 3 in)
- Weight: 54 kg (119 lb)

Sport
- Sport: Swimming
- Strokes: Freestyle, butterfly
Medal record
Women's swimming
Representing Australia
Olympic Games
Gold medal – first place	1980 Moscow	800 m freestyle
Bronze medal – third place	1980 Moscow	200 m butterfly
Commonwealth Games
Gold medal – first place	1978 Edmonton	200 m butterfly
Gold medal – first place	1982 Brisbane	200 m butterfly
Silver medal – second place	1978 Edmonton	400 m freestyle
Silver medal – second place	1978 Edmonton	800 m freestyle
Silver medal – second place	1982 Brisbane	800 m freestyle
Bronze medal – third place	1978 Edmonton	200 m freestyle
Bronze medal – third place	1978 Edmonton	4×100 m freestyle
Summer Universiade
Silver medal – second place	1985 Kobe	4×200 m freestyle
Bronze medal – third place	1983 Edmonton	200 m butterfly

Michelle Jan Ford MBE (born 15 July 1962) is an Australian former long-distance freestyle and butterfly swimmer of the 1970s and 1980s, who won a gold medal in the 800-metre freestyle, bronze in the 200-metre butterfly, and 4th in the 400-metres freestyle at the 1980 Summer Olympics in Moscow. She was the only non-Eastern Bloc female swimmer to win an individual gold medal at the 1980 games. She also set two world records in her career, and was the first Australian woman to win individual Olympic medals in two distinct specialised strokes.

Ford, the second of four children grew up in the seaside Sydney suburb of Sans Souci, familiar with water, as her father Ian, a dentist, had narrowly missed Olympic selection as a yachtsman. After learning to swim at the age of six, she made national headlines when she swam the 100-yard freestyle in 61.5 seconds, at the age of 12, the fastest time ever set by a swimmer at such an age.

In January 1976, at the New South Wales Age Championships, at the North Sydney pool, she broke six state and three national records at the age of 13, two of which had previously been held by triple Olympic gold medallist Shane Gould. She proceeded to compete at the Australian Championships, where she won the 200-metre butterfly, despite standing only 140 centimetres, setting another national and Commonwealth record in the process. Another strong performance in the 200-metre freestyle lead to selection for both events for the 1976 Summer Olympics in Montreal. After a seven-week national training camp, she competed in her first Olympic race in the 200-metre freestyle, where her competition included the eventual champion, Kornelia Ender of East Germany.

After the Olympics, Ford scaled her training back to catch up on her studies at St George Girls High School. On the advice of her coach Dick Caine, she began to concentrate on distance freestyle swimming, and in 1977 set an Australian record in the 400-metre freestyle at the New South Wales Age Championships, before setting another national record at the Australian Championships in the 800-metre freestyle, as well as winning the 200-metre freestyle. The following year in 1978, at the KB international meet in Brisbane, she broke the 800-metre freestyle record of East Germany's Petra Thumer by 0.18 of a second, setting a new time of 8:35.04, lowering her own national record by 10 seconds. She also set another Australian and Commonwealth record in the 200-metre butterfly. A fortnight later, Ford lowered her record to 8:31.30.

At the 1978 Commonwealth Games in Edmonton, Ford won gold in the 200-metre butterfly, silver in the 400-metres and 800-metre freestyle, bronze in the 200-metre freestyle and 4x100-metre freestyle relay.

In 1979, Ford missed the Australian Championships to concentrate on her final year of high school. At the Soviet Spartakiad Games later in the year, she won three golds in the 200-metre butterfly and 400- and 800-metre freestyle. She then moved to Nashville, Tennessee, in the United States, to train and compete under Don Talbot on the American domestic circuit. Ford won the 800- and the 1500-metre freestyle, and was second in the 200- and 400-metre freestyle at the 1980 Australian Championships to gain selection for the 1980 Moscow Olympics. Under public pressure from the Government of Australia, particularly Prime Minister Malcolm Fraser, who as the patron of the Australian Olympic Committee to boycott the Games in protest of the Soviet Union's invasion of Afghanistan.

Ford chose to attend the games, competing in the 200-metre butterfly and the 400- and 800-metre freestyle. In the 200-metre butterfly, she qualified fastest, ahead of East Germany's Andrea Pollack and Ines Geissler. In the final the East Germans turned the tables, with Geissler and Sybille Schonrock leading Ford home into the bronze medal position. She qualified third fastest in the 400-metre freestyle, but the strategy undertaken by the East German trio coaxed her into deviating from her pre-race plan. She finished fourth. Later, in her final event, the 800 m freestyle, Ford had qualified behind another East German, Ines Diers. Ford made a slow start, lying in seventh at the 100-metre mark before snatching the lead from Diers at the 200-metre mark and extending it to a 3.65-second victory winning Olympic gold medal and claiming the Olympic Record.

After returning to Australia, Ford attempted to break the 16-minute barrier in the 1500-metre freestyle, but was thwarted, firstly by a timing failure, then by New South Wales, who did not want her to make her second attempt in Queensland, and finally disqualification on her third attempt for incorrectly withdrawing from a previous race. Frustrated, she retired from swimming in 1981.

In 1981, Ford attended the University of Wollongong until taking up a scholarship at the University of Southern California, Los Angeles, where she completed a bachelor's degree in business communication and a master's degree in sports psychology.

Ford was one of 30 athletes to be invited by President Samaranch to the Olympic Congress in Baden Baden and became one of the inaugural members of the IOC Athletes Commission.

In 1982 Commonwealth Games she won the 200-metre butterfly for the second time and silver in the 800-metre freestyle.

Ford was made a Member of the Order of the British Empire in 1982, and was inducted into the International Swimming Hall of Fame as an "Honour Swimmer" in 1994. In 2025, she was inducted into the Swimming Australia Hall of Fame.

== See also ==
- List of members of the International Swimming Hall of Fame
- List of Olympic medallists in swimming (women)
- World record progression 800 metres freestyle

== Bibliography ==
- Andrews, Malcolm (2000). Australia at the Olympic Games. Sydney, New South Wales: ABC Books. pp. 162–164. ISBN 0-7333-0884-8.
- Howell, Max (1986). Aussie Gold. Albion, Queensland: Brooks Waterloo. pp. 229–233. ISBN 0-86440-680-0.
