= John L. Simon =

American swimming coach

John L. Simon, better known as Jack Simon, is an American national swimming coach and former president of the American Swimming Coaches Association (ASCA). Now semi-retired, Simon is coaching swimming in Malaysia.

== Swimmers coached by Simon ==
- Joe Hudepohl, U.S. Olympian
- Paul Hartloff, U.S. Olympian
- David Berkoff, U.S. 1988, 1992 Olympic gold medalist and 100-meter backstroke World Record Holder
- Bruce Stahl, World Record Holder
- Anne Tweedy, American Record Holder, National Champion
- Patty Gavin, American Record Holder, National Champion
- Libby Kinkead, U.S. Olympian, National Champion
- Lauren Costella, National Champion
- Blaise Mathews, Junior National Champion
- Chris Craft, Junior National Champion
- Justin Barber, Junior National Champion

US Teams Coached by Simon

- Santa Barbara Swim Club
- Cincinnati Marlins
- Foxcatcher
- Carson Tiger Sharks

Simon led two teams (West Chester and Cincinnati Marlins) to top-three finishes at U.S nationals while accumulating numerous other national championships at West Chester and Foxcatcher and age group levels.
