= Yelena Ivanova (swimmer) =

Soviet swimmer

Personal information
- Born: 14 March 1963 (age 63)

Sport
- Sport: Swimming

Yelena Ivanova (born 14 March 1963) is a Soviet freestyle swimmer. She competed in the women's 800 metre freestyle at the 1980 Summer Olympics.
