= Anders Rutqvist =

Swedish swimmer

Personal information
- Born: August 30, 1958 (age 67) Krokom, Jämtland, Sweden

Sport
- Sport: Swimming
- Club: Mariestads SS

Sven Anders Rutqvist (born 30 August 1958) is a former Swedish Olympic swimmer. He swam in the prelims for the 4×200 m freestyle team in the 1980 Summer Olympics.

== Clubs ==
- Mariestads SS
