= Viktor Kuznetsov (swimmer) =

Soviet swimmer

Personal information
- Native name: Виктор Александрович Кузнецов
- Full name: Viktor Aleksandrovich Kuznetsov
- Born: 21 May 1961 (age 65) Saint Petersburg, Russia
Medal record
Men's swimming
Representing the Soviet Union
Olympic Games
Silver medal – second place	1980 Moscow	100 m backstroke
Silver medal – second place	1980 Moscow	4×100 m medley relay
European Championships (LC)
Gold medal – first place	1981 Split	4×100 m medley
Bronze medal – third place	1981 Split	100 m backstroke
Summer Universiade
Bronze medal – third place	1983 Edmonton	100 m backstroke

Viktor Aleksandrovich Kuznetsov (Russian: Виктор Александрович Кузнецов, born 21 May 1961) is a former backstroke swimmer from the Soviet Union. He won two silver medals at the boycotted 1980 Summer Olympics in Moscow, USSR.
