= Martin Callaghan =

Australian water polo player

Personal information
- Born: August 3, 1962 (age 64)

Sport
- Sport: Water polo

Martin Callaghan (born 3 August 1962) is an Australian former water polo player who competed in the 1980 Summer Olympics and in the 1984 Summer Olympics.
