= Oksana Komissarova =

Russian swimmer

Personal information
- Born: 15 November 1964 (age 61) Volzhsky, Volgograd Oblast, USSR
- Height: 1.63 m (5 ft 4 in)
- Weight: 50 kg (110 lb)

Sport
- Sport: Swimming

Oksana Komissarova (Russian: Оксана Комиссарова; born 15 November 1964) is a Russian swimmer. She took part in the 1980 Summer Olympics and finished fifth in the 800 m freestyle event.

Between 1995 and 1999 she competed in the masters category. She won a bronze medal at the world championships in 1996; she also won three national titles and set four national records.

She was born in Volzhsky, near Volgograd and in 1982 moved to Kishinev, but then returned to Volzhsky. She has five children, born between 1987 and 2007, and works as a sports instructor for children.
