= Anthony Falson =

Australian water polo player

Personal information
- Born: July 25, 1953 (age 71)

Sport
- Sport: Water polo

Anthony Falson (born 25 July 1953) is an Australian former water polo player who competed in the 1980 Summer Olympics.
