= Dorota Brzozowska =

Polish swimmer (born 1964)

Personal information
- Born: 6 August 1964 (age 61) Szczecin, Poland

Sport
- Sport: Swimming

Dorota Brzozowska (born 6 August 1964) is a Polish butterfly swimmer. She competed in two events at the 1980 Summer Olympics.
