= Heike Dähne =

East German swimmer

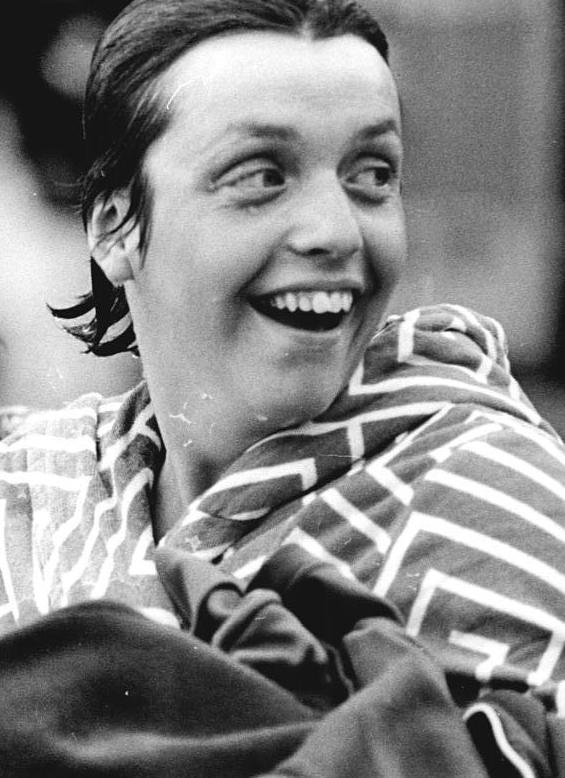
- Heike Dähne in 1979

Personal information
- Born: 15 October 1961 (age 64) Zwickau, Bezirk Karl-Marx-Stadt, East Germany
- Height: 1.72 m (5 ft 8 in)
- Weight: 67 kg (148 lb)

Sport
- Sport: Swimming
- Strokes: Freestyle, butterfly
- Club: SC Karl-Marx-Stadt
Medal record
Representing East Germany
Olympic Games
Bronze medal – third place	1980 Moscow	800 m freestyle
World Championships
Bronze medal – third place	1982 Guayaquil	200 m butterfly
European Championships
Silver medal – second place	1981 Split	200 m butterfly

Heike Dähne (later Möller then Dähne-Kummerow, born 15 October 1961) is a German former swimmer. She competed in the 1980 Summer Olympics and won a bronze medal in the 800 m freestyle. Later she won two medals in the 200 m butterfly at the European and world championships.
