= Sybille Schönrock =

East German swimmer

Personal information
- Born: 28 July 1964 (age 61)
Medal record
Women's swimming
Representing East Germany
Olympic Games
Silver medal – second place	1980 Moscow	200 m butterfly

Sybille Schönrock (born 28 July 1964) is a former butterfly swimmer from East Germany. At age fifteen she won the silver medal in the women's 200m butterfly at the boycotted 1980 Summer Olympics in Moscow.
