= Moisés Gosálvez =

Spanish swimmer

Personal information
- Born: January 13, 1960 (age 66)

Sport
- Sport: Swimming
- Strokes: Backstroke

Moisés Gosálvez (born 13 January 1960) is a Spanish former backstroke swimmer who competed in the 1980 Summer Olympics.
