= Dominique Petit =

French swimmer

Personal information
- Born: 5 March 1961 (age 65)

Sport
- Sport: Swimming

Dominique Petit (born 5 March 1961) is a French freestyle swimmer. He competed in two events at the 1980 Summer Olympics.
