= David Palfreyman (rowing) =

Australian rowing cox

Personal information
- Born: 1945 (age 80–81)

Sport
- Country: Australia
- Sport: Rowing
- Club: Mercantile Rowing Club

Achievements and titles
- National finals: Penrith Cup '60, '62, '64; King's Cup '61, '63, '72
Medal record
Men's rowing
Representing Australia
British Empire and Commonwealth Games
Gold medal – first place	1962 Perth	Men's Eights

David Palfreyman (born 1945) is an Australian former coxswain, rower and rowing coach. He was a national champion three times as a coxswain and twice as a rower and won a gold medal at the 1962 Commonwealth Games.

== Club and state rowing ==
David Palfreyman's commenced his association with the Mercantile Rowing Club in Melbourne as a coxswain at aged thirteen coaching veteran crews. He is the grandson of Cecil McVilly, a sculler who in 1912 was the first rower to represent Australia at an Olympic games.

He first made state selection for Victoria coxing the 1960 state lightweight four contesting the Penrith Cup at the Interstate Regatta. He coxed another Victorian crew which won the Penrith Cup in 1962. In 1961 and in 1963 he coxed Victorian men's eights to victory in the King's Cup at the Interstate Regattas in those years.

In 1964 Palfreyman took up an oar and was successful in being selected to stroke that year's Victorian lightweight four. That crew won the 1964 Penrith Cup title as the champion state representative lightweight four at the Interstate Regatta. In 1972 and in 1974 he stroked the Victoria men's eights which contested the King's Cup at the Interstate Regatta.

In 1966 he stroked a Mercantile four which won the coxless four Australian title at the Australian Rowing Championships.

== International representative rowing ==
The entire winning Victorian King's Cup crew of 1962 was selected as the Australian eight to contest the 1962 Commonwealth Games. Their coxswain Norton was unable to make the trip and Palfreyman, who'd coxed the Victorian lightweight four to a Penrith Cup victory took the eight and steered it to a gold medal victory at the Commonwealth Games in Perth. That same crew was encouraged to represent Australia at the inaugural FISA World Championships, the 1962 World Championships in Lucerne. They financed their trip themselves, made it through to the final and finished in overall fifth place.

The 1966 Australian champion coxless four which he stroked was selected in toto that year to represent at the 1966 World Rowing Championships in Bled. They missed the semi-final by a 0.04 margin and were eliminated in the repechage.

== Coaching career ==
Following competitive rowing retirement Palfreyman had a thirty-year coaching career of school, club, state, national and Olympic crews. In some years he coached part-time at the Victorian Institute of Sport.

For seven consecutive years from 1980 to 1986 Palfreyman coached the Victorian state women's fours who contested and all won the ULVA Trophy at the Australian Interstate Regatta. In 1983 he also coached the Victorian men's eight who came second in that year's King's Cup.

He took Australian crews to six World Rowing Championships between 1978 and 1985 - lightweight eights in 1978 and 1984; a women's coxed four in 1979; and women's pairs in 1981, 1982 and 1985. In 1980 he was the coach of the Australian women's coxed four who rowed to a fifth place at the 1980 Moscow Olympics. In 2008 he coached the Australian Women's Double Scull at the Beijing Olympic Games.

== Coaching palmares ==
Australian Interstate Regatta

- 1980 Interstate Women's Four Championship coach - First
- 1981 Interstate Women's Four Championship coach - First
- 1982 Interstate Women's Four Championship coach - First
- 1983 Interstate Men's Eight Championship coach - Second
- 1983 Interstate Women's Four Championship coach – First
- 1984 Interstate Women's Four Championship coach - First
- 1985 Interstate Women's Four Championship coach – First
- 1986 Interstate Women's Four Championship coach – First

World Championships and Olympics

- 1978 World Championships Men's lightweight eight coach – Bronze
- 1979 World Championships Women's coxed four coach - 5th
- 1981 World Championships Women's pair coach – 8th
- 1982 World Championships Women's pair coach – 9th
- 1984 World Championships Men's lightweight eight coach – 10th
- 1985 World Championships Women's pair coach - 8th
- 1980 Moscow Olympics Women's coxed four coach – 5th
- 2008 Beijing Olympics Women's double scull coach – 8th
