= Kevin Bradshaw (cyclist) =

Australian cyclist (1957–2021)

Personal information
- Born: 30 April 1957
- Died: 16 March 2021 (aged 63)

Cycling career
- Sport: Cycling

Kevin Bradshaw (30 April 1957 – 16 March 2021) was an Australian cyclist. He competed in the individual road race and team time trial events at the 1980 Summer Olympics.
