= Federico Silvestri =

Italian swimmer (born 1963)

Personal information
- Born: 22 July 1963 (age 62)

Sport
- Sport: Swimming

Federico Silvestri (born 22 July 1963) is an Italian swimmer. He competed in the men's 4 × 200 metre freestyle relay at the 1980 Summer Olympics.
