= Detlev Grabs =

East German swimmer

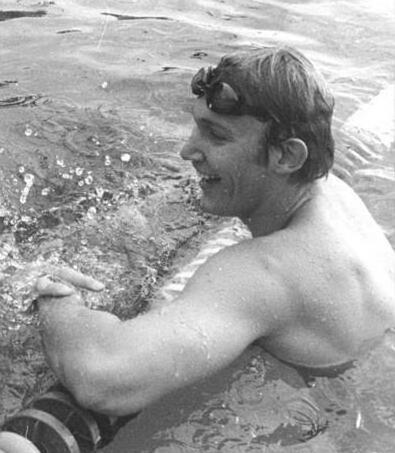
- Detlev Grabs in 1979

Personal information
- Born: 29 October 1960 (age 65) Berlin, Germany
- Height: 1.83 m (6 ft 0 in)
- Weight: 76 kg (168 lb)

Sport
- Sport: Swimming
- Club: SC Dynamo Berlin
Medal record
Representing East Germany
Olympic Games
Silver medal – second place	1980 Moscow	4×200 m freestyle relay
European Championships
Bronze medal – third place	1977 Jönköping	4×200 m freestyle relay

Detlev Grabs (born 29 October 1960) is a German researcher in anatomy and cell biology and a former East German swimmer. He competed at the 1980 Summer Olympics and won a silver medal in the 4 × 200 m freestyle relay; he failed to reach the finals in the 200 m and 400 m freestyle events. He was also part of the East German team that finished third in the 4 × 200 m freestyle relay at the 1977 European Aquatics Championships.

After retiring from swimming, between 1984 and 1990 he studied human medicine at the Humboldt University in Berlin, defending his PhD in 1990. Then until 1997 he worked as a post-doc at the Institute of Anatomy, Berlin (1990–1997); University of Ulm, Germany (1992); and Yale University, United States (1994–1996). In 1999 he obtained his habilitation degree in anatomy and cell biology from the University of Fribourg in Switzerland, where he worked between 1997 and 2007. His thesis title was "The cycle of small synaptic vesicles". In 2007 he was appointed as a full professor of anatomy at the Université du Québec à Trois-Rivières in Canada.

He is married to Dr. Ursula Grabs, and they have a daughter.
