= Vladimir Dolgov =

Soviet swimmer (1960–2022)

Personal information
- Born: 11 May 1960 Kharkiv, USSR
- Died: 10 January 2022 (aged 61) North Carolina, U.S.
Medal record
Men's swimming
Representing the Soviet Union
Olympic Games
Bronze medal – third place	1980 Moscow	100 m backstroke
Summer Universiade
Silver medal – second place	1981 Bucharest	100 m backstroke

Vladimir Genrikhovich Dolgov (Russian: Владимир Генрихович Долгов, 11 May 1960 – 10 January 2022) was a backstroke swimmer from the Soviet Union. He won the bronze medal in the men's 100m backstroke event at the 1980 Summer Olympics in Moscow, USSR. He later emigrated to the United States, working as a swimming coach for Sailfish Aquatics at Huntersville Family Fitness & Aquatics in North Carolina.

Dolgov died from stomach cancer on 10 January 2022, at the age of 61.
