= Georgios Karpouzis =

Greek swimmer

Personal information
- Born: 20 April 1958 (age 68) Alexandria, Egypt

Sport
- Sport: Swimming

Georgios Karpouzis (born 20 April 1958) is a Greek former swimmer. He competed in three events at the 1976 Summer Olympics.
