= Mihai Mandache =

Romanian swimmer (1960–2019)

Personal information
- Born: 4 September 1960
- Died: 25 July 2019 (aged 58) Silverdale, Auckland, New Zealand

Sport
- Sport: Swimming

Mihai Mandache (4 September 1960 – 25 July 2019) was a Romanian backstroke swimmer. He competed in two events at the 1980 Summer Olympics.
