= José María Larrañaga =

Peruvian swimmer

Personal information
- Born: 7 July 1963 (age 63)

Sport
- Sport: Swimming

José María Larrañaga (born 7 July 1963) is a Peruvian freestyle swimmer. He competed in two events at the 1980 Summer Olympics.
