= Johan Van Steenberghe =

Belgian swimmer

Personal information
- Born: 9 September 1956 (age 69) Eeklo, Belgium

Sport
- Sport: Swimming

Johan Van Steenberghe (born 9 September 1956) is a Belgian former freestyle swimmer. He competed in two events at the 1976 Summer Olympics.
