= Sigurður Ólafsson (swimmer) =

Icelandic swimmer

Personal information
- Born: 18 September 1954 (age 72)

Sport
- Sport: Swimming

Sigurður Ólafsson (born 18 September 1954) is an Icelandic former freestyle swimmer. He competed in four events at the 1976 Summer Olympics.
