= Petr Adamec =

Czech swimmer

Personal information
- Born: 6 June 1960 (age 66)

Sport
- Sport: Swimming

Petr Adamec (born 6 June 1960) is a Czech swimmer. Representing Czechoslovakia, Adamec specialized in freestyle swimming and participated in various national and international competitions. He competed in three events at the 1980 Summer Olympics.
