= Jörg Stingl =

German swimmer

Personal information
- Born: 6 July 1961 (age 65) Chemnitz, Germany

Sport
- Sport: Swimming

Jörg Stingl (born 6 July 1961) is a German swimmer. He competed in two events at the 1980 Summer Olympics for East Germany.
