= Róbert Rudolf =

Hungarian swimmer (born 1957)

Personal information
- Born: 20 June 1957 (age 69) Budapest, Hungary
- Height: 1.87 m (6 ft 2 in)
- Weight: 70 kg (150 lb)

Sport
- Sport: Swimming
- Club: Központi Sportiskola/Budapesti Honvéd Sportegyesület
Medal record
Representing Hungary
European Championships
Bronze medal – third place	1974 Vienna	200 m backstroke

Róbert Rudolf (born 20 June 1957) is a retired Hungarian swimmer who won a bronze medal at the 1974 European Aquatics Championships. He competed in the 100 m and 200 m backstroke events at the Summer Olympics of 1972, 1976 and 1980; his best achievement was seventh place in 200 m in 1976.
