= Petar Kochanov =

Bulgarian swimmer

Personal information
- Born: 31 January 1963 (age 63)

Sport
- Sport: Swimming

Petar Kochanov (Bulgarian: Петър Кочанов; born 31 January 1963) is a Bulgarian swimmer. He competed in three events at the 1980 Summer Olympics.
