= Dietmar Göhring =

German swimmer (born 1960)

Personal information
- Born: 15 July 1960 (age 65) Leipzig, Germany

Sport
- Sport: Swimming

Dietmar Göhring (born 15 July 1960) is a German swimmer. He competed in three events at the 1980 Summer Olympics for East Germany.
