= Frank Pfütze =

German swimmer (1959–1991)

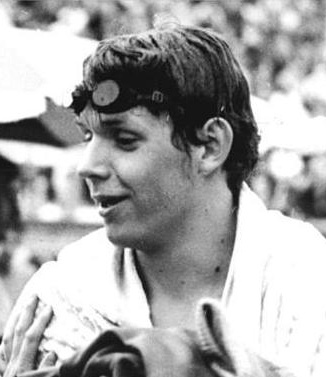
- Pfütze in 1977

Personal information
- Born: 15 January 1959 Rostock, East Germany
- Died: 20 January 1991 (aged 32) Berlin, Germany
- Height: 1.84 m (6 ft 0 in)
- Weight: 74 kg (163 lb)

Sport
- Sport: Swimming
- Club: SC Dynamo Berlin
Medal record
Men's swimming
Representing East Germany
Olympic Games
Silver medal – second place	1980 Moscow	4×200 m freestyle
World Championships
Bronze medal – third place	1975 Cali	400 m freestyle
European Championships
Gold medal – first place	1974 Vienna	1500 m freestyle
Bronze medal – third place	1977 Jönköping	4×200 m freestyle
Bronze medal – third place	1977 Jönköping	400 m freestyle

Frank Pfütze (15 January 1959 – 20 January 1991) was a German freestyle swimmer who competed at the 1976 and 1980 Summer Olympics in five events.

== Career ==
He won a silver medal in the 4 × 200 m freestyle relay in 1980 and finished fifth in the same event in 1976. In individual events he was eliminated in the preliminaries

He also won four medals at the 1975 World Aquatics Championships and LEN European Aquatics Championships of 1974 and 1977, including one gold in the 1500 m freestyle (1974), setting a new European record. He broke another European record in 1976, in the 400 m freestyle.

== Death ==
Pfütze died of a sudden heart failure at age 32, leaving a wife and a son. Whereas the cause of his death remained uncertain, it was tentatively related to the East German doping program that Pfütze was involved in.
