= Gerhard Waldmann =

Swiss swimmer (born 1959)

Personal information
- Born: 28 May 1959 (age 67)

Sport
- Sport: Swimming

Gerhard Waldmann (born 28 May 1959) is a Swiss former freestyle swimmer. He competed in two events at the 1976 Summer Olympics.
