= Radek Havel (swimmer) =

Czech swimmer

Personal information
- Born: 25 February 1961 (age 65)

Sport
- Sport: Swimming

Radek Havel (born 25 February 1961) is a Czech swimmer. He competed in three events at the 1980 Summer Olympics.
