= Stefan Wenz =

German swimmer

Personal information
- Born: 15 February 1957 (age 69) Frankfurt, Germany

Sport
- Sport: Swimming

Stefan Wenz (born 15 February 1957) is a German former swimmer. He competed in two events at the 1976 Summer Olympics.
