= Aleksandr Chayev =

Russian swimmer (born 1962)

Personal information
- Born: 17 March 1962 (age 64) Voronezh, Russia
Medal record
Men's Swimming
Representing the Soviet Union
Olympic Games
Silver medal – second place	1980 Moskva	1500 m freestyle
European Championships
Gold medal – first place	1981 Split	4×100 m freestyle
Gold medal – first place	1981 Split	4×200 m freestyle
Summer Universiade
Gold medal – first place	1981 Bucharest	1500 m freestyle

Aleksandr Chayev (born 17 March 1962 in Voronezh) is a Russian former swimmer who competed in the 1980 Summer Olympics.
