= David Cummins =

Irish swimmer

Personal information
- Born: 27 December 1961 (age 64)

Sport
- Sport: Swimming

David Cummins (born 27 December 1961) is an Irish former swimmer. Originally from Dublin, he participated in the British Amateur Swimming Association short course championships in 1980, winning three titles. Cummins, who held a number of Irish records, represented the country in three events at the 1980 Summer Olympics.
