= Brian Goodell =

American swimmer and mayor

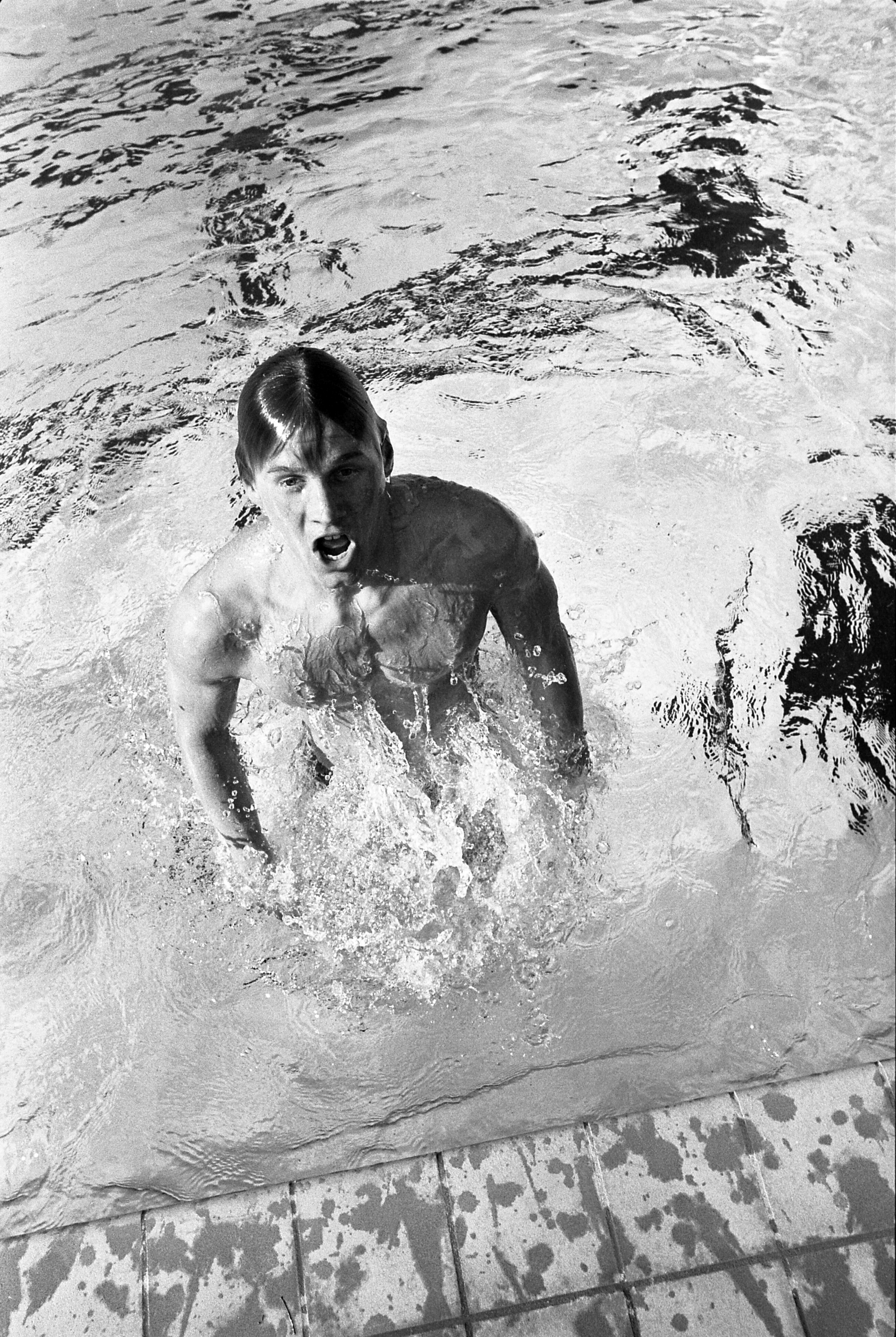
- Goodell in 1978

Personal information
- Full name: Brian Stuart Goodell
- National team: United States
- Born: April 2, 1959 (age 67) Stockton, California, U.S.
- Height: 5 ft 8 in (1.73 m)
- Weight: 148 lb (67 kg)

Sport
- Sport: Swimming
- Strokes: Freestyle
- Club: Mission Viejo Nadadores
- College team: University of California, Los Angeles
- Coach: Mark Schubert, Nadadores; Ron Ballatore, UCLA
Medal record
Men's swimming
Representing the United States
Olympic Games
Gold medal – first place	1976 Montreal	400 m freestyle
Gold medal – first place	1976 Montreal	1500 m freestyle
World Championships (LC)
Silver medal – second place	1975 Cali	1500 m freestyle
Pan American Games
Gold medal – first place	1979 San Juan	400 m freestyle
Gold medal – first place	1979 San Juan	1500 m freestyle
Gold medal – first place	1979 San Juan	4x200 m freestyle

Brian Stuart Goodell (born April 2, 1959) is an American politician, former competitive swimmer, two-time Olympic champion, and former world record-holder in two events. He is a three-time mayor and two-time city councilman of Mission Viejo, California.

== Career ==
At the 1976 Olympic Games in Montreal, Quebec, he won gold medals for his first-place finishes in the 400-meter and 1,500-meter freestyle events. He also won gold medals in both events at the 1979 Pan American Games in San Juan, Puerto Rico. He received a silver medal in 1,500-meter freestyle at the 1975 World Aquatics Championships in Cali, Colombia.

After graduating from Mission Viejo High School, he attended college at the University of California, Los Angeles (UCLA), where he swam for coach Ron Ballatore's UCLA Bruins swimming and diving team in National Collegiate Athletic Association (NCAA) and Pacific-10 Conference competition from 1978 to 1980. During his college swimming career, he won nine NCAA individual championships, including three times in each of the 500-yard freestyle, 1,650-yard freestyle, and the 400-yard individual medley.

Goodell held the 400-meter freestyle (long course) world record from June 18, 1976 to April 6, 1979, and the 1,500-meter freestyle (long course) world record from 1976 to 1980.

He was recognized as the Male World Swimmer of the Year by Swimming World magazine in 1977. He was inducted into the International Swimming Hall of Fame as an "Honor Swimmer" in 1986.

Brian Goodell and his wife, Vicki, are licensed Realtors in California and have created The Gold Medal Group with Berkshire Hathaway.

In 2016, Goodell was elected to the City Council of his hometown of Mission Viejo, California, serving as its mayor for calendar years 2020, 2023, and 2026.

== See also ==
- List of Olympic medalists in swimming (men)
- List of University of California, Los Angeles people
- List of World Aquatics Championships medalists in swimming (men)
- World record progression 400 metres freestyle
- World record progression 1500 metres freestyle

Records
Preceded by Tim Shaw	Men's 400-meter freestyle world record-holder (long course); June 18, 1976 – April 6, 1979	Succeeded by Vladimir Salnikov
Preceded by Stephen Holland	Men's 1,500-meter freestyle world record-holder (long course); June 21, 1976 – July 22, 1980	Succeeded by Vladimir Salnikov
Preceded by John Naber	Swimming World; World Swimmer of the Year; 1977	Succeeded by Jesse Vassallo
