= Michael Söderlund =

Swedish swimmer

Personal information
- Full name: Per Michael Söderlund
- Nationality: Swedish
- Born: 30 March 1962 (age 64) Karlskrona, Blekinge
- Height: 1.81 m (5 ft 11 in)

Sport
- Sport: Swimming
- Strokes: Freestyle and backstroke
- Club: Karlskrona SS
- College team: University of California, Berkeley
Medal record
Olympic Games
Bronze medal – third place	1984 Los Angeles	4×100 m freestyle
European Championships (LC)
Silver medal – second place	1981 Split	200 m freestyle
Silver medal – second place	1985 Sofia	4×200 m freestyle
Bronze medal – third place	1981 Split	4×200 m freestyle
Bronze medal – third place	1985 Sofia	4×100 m freestyle
Bronze medal – third place	1987 Strasbourg	4×200 m freestyle

Michael Söderlund (born 30 March 1962 in Karlskrona, Blekinge) is a former swimmer from Sweden who competed in three consecutive Summer Olympics, between 1980 and 1988. In the 1984 Summer Olympics, he was a part of the 4×100 m freestyle relay team, swimming one leg in the prelims. His best individual result in the Olympics was a 6th place on 200 m backstroke on the time of 2:04.10, which was a Swedish record for 27 years. Soderlund was on the 400-meter freestyle relay team that captured the bronze medal in the ’84 Olympiad at Los Angeles.

== Career ==
Söderlund began his international career at the 1978 World Championships in West Berlin. He finished 13th in the 100-meter backstroke. The Swedish 4x100-meter medley relay team of Michael Söderlund, Jan Sjöström, Pär Arvidsson, and Per Holmertz finished fifth. At the 1980 Olympic Games in Moscow, Söderlund competed in four events. He swam the fastest qualifying time in the 100-meter backstroke but was eliminated in the semifinals, finishing tenth. His compatriot Bengt Baron won the gold medal.

== Personal bests ==
=== Long course (50 m) ===
Event	Time	Date	Meet	Location	Ref
200 m freestyle	1:51.44	24 Mar 1988	US Summer Nationals	Orlando, FL, United States	
200 m backstroke	2:04.10	26 Jul 1980	Olympic Games	Moscow, Soviet Union	

Legend: WR – World record; ER – European record; NR – Swedish record;
Records not set in finals: h – heat; sf – semifinal; r – relay 1st leg; rh – relay heat 1st leg; b – B final; † – en route to final mark; so – swim-off; tt – time trial

== Clubs ==
- Karlskrona SS
