= Rainer Strohbach =

East German swimmer

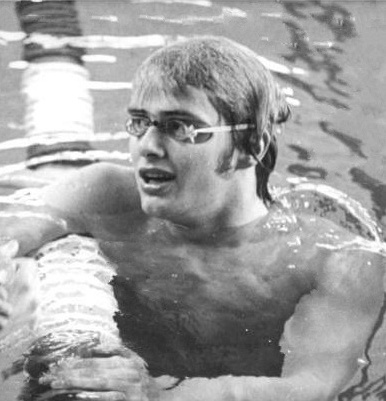
- Strohbach in 1976

Personal information
- Born: 17 April 1958 (age 68) Dresden, East Germany
- Height: 1.82 m (6 ft 0 in)
- Weight: 78 kg (172 lb)

Sport
- Sport: Swimming
- Club: Berliner TSC
Medal record
Representing East Germany
Olympic Games
Silver medal – second place	1980 Moscow	4×200 m freestyle
European Championships
Bronze medal – third place	1977 Jönköping	4×200 m freestyle

Rainer Strohbach (born 17 April 1958) is a retired German swimmer. He competed at the 1976 and 1980 Summer Olympics in six freestyle events in total. He had his best results in the 4 × 200 m freestyle relay, finishing in fifth and second place, respectively. He won a bronze medal in this event at the 1977 European Aquatics Championships.

He was married to Kirsten Wenzel, a German rower who also competed at the 1980 Olympics.
