= Miloslav Rolko =

Slovak former swimmer (born 1960)

Miloslav Roľko
Personal information
- Full name: Miloslav Roľko
- Nationality: Czechoslovakia
- Born: October 13, 1960 (age 65) Bratislava, Slovakia
- Height: 1.80 m (5 ft 11 in)
- Weight: 65 kg (143 lb)

Sport
- Sport: Swimming
- Strokes: Medley, Backstroke, Butterfly
Medal record
Men's swimming
Representing Czechoslovakia
European Championships
| Gold medal – first place | 1977 Jönköping | 100 m backstroke |
| Silver medal – second place | 1977 Jönköping | 200 m backstroke |
Summer Universiade
| Bronze medal – third place | 1981 Bucharest | 100 m butterfly |

Miloslav Rolko (born 13 October 1960) is a Slovak former swimmer who swam for Czechoslovakia at the 1976 and 1980 Olympics. At the 1977 European Championships, he won the 100 backstroke, and finished second in the 200 back.

In 1982 Rolko, along with fellow swimmers Vlastimil Černý, Tereza Vrtiskova and Josef Kuf, defected from Czechoslovakia following a meet in Sindelfingen, West Germany.

As of 2012, Rolko is federal junior coach for Luxembourg, working with FLNS. His daughter, Sarah, swam for Luxembourg at the 2009 European Junior Championships.

== See also ==
cs:Miloslav Rolko—entry from Czech Wikipedia (in Czech)
