= Sándor Nagy (swimmer) =

Hungarian swimmer

Personal information
- Born: 24 September 1960 (age 65) Gyula, Hungary

Sport
- Sport: Swimming

Sándor Nagy (born 24 September 1960) is a Hungarian former swimmer. He competed at the 1976 Summer Olympics and the 1980 Summer Olympics.
