= István Koczka =

Hungarian swimmer

Personal information
- Born: 22 July 1958 (age 68) Budapest, Hungary

Sport
- Sport: Swimming

István Koczka (born 22 July 1958) is a Hungarian former swimmer. He competed in two events at the 1976 Summer Olympics.
