= Max Metzker =

South African Olympic swimmer

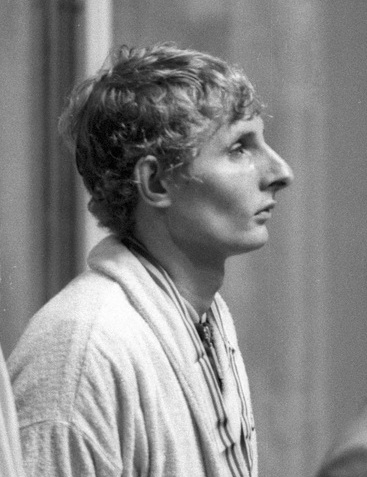

Personal information
- Full name: Maxwell Raymond Metzker
- Nickname: "Max"
- National team: Australia
- Born: 8 March 1960 (age 66) Durban, South Africa
- Height: 1.79 m (5 ft 10 in)
- Weight: 70 kg (154 lb)

Sport
- Sport: Swimming
- Strokes: Freestyle
- College team: University of Alabama
Medal record
Men's swimming
Representing Australia
Olympic Games
Bronze medal – third place	1980 Moscow	1500 m freestyle
Commonwealth Games
Gold medal – first place	1978 Edmonton	1500 m freestyle
Gold medal – first place	1978 Edmonton	4×200 m freestyle
Gold medal – first place	1982 Brisbane	1500 m freestyle
Bronze medal – third place	1978 Edmonton	400 m freestyle

Maxwell Raymond Metzker (born 8 March 1960) is a South African-born former long-distance freestyle swimmer who represented Australia in the late 1970s and early 1980s, who won a bronze medal in the 1500 m freestyle at the 1980 Summer Olympics in Moscow. He was a co-flagbearer with Denise Boyd at the opening ceremony, when Australia marched under the Olympic flag to protest the Soviet Union's invasion of Afghanistan.

Metzker first showed his international pedigree in the pool at the 1976 Summer Olympics in Montreal, coming sixth in the 1500-metre freestyle and 13th in the 400-metre event.

He had his first international success at the 1978 Commonwealth Games in Edmonton, Canada, winning a gold and bronze medal in the 1500-metre and 400-metre freestyle respectively. He also claimed a gold medal in the 4×200-metre freestyle relay.

In Moscow, Metzker trailed the great Soviet swimmer Vladimir Salnikov home by some 25 seconds. Salnikov broke the world record, being the first man to break the 15-minute barrier. Metzker was pipped to the silver by just 0.19 of a second by Salnikov's compatriot Aleksandr Chaev. Metzker also reached the final of the 400-metre freestyle and the 4×200-metre freestyle relay, finishing seventh in both. Metzker retired from international competition with another gold in the 1500-metre freestyle at the 1982 Commonwealth Games in Brisbane.

== See also ==
- List of Commonwealth Games medallists in swimming (men)
- List of Olympic medalists in swimming (men)
