= Kevin Williamson (swimmer) =

Irish swimmer

Personal information
- Nationality: Irish
- Born: 18 January 1959 (age 67)

Sport
- Sport: Swimming
- College team: University of Michigan

Kevin Williamson (born 18 January 1959) is an Irish former swimmer. He competed at the 1976 Summer Olympics and the 1980 Summer Olympics.
