= Fred Eefting =

Dutch swimmer (born 1959)

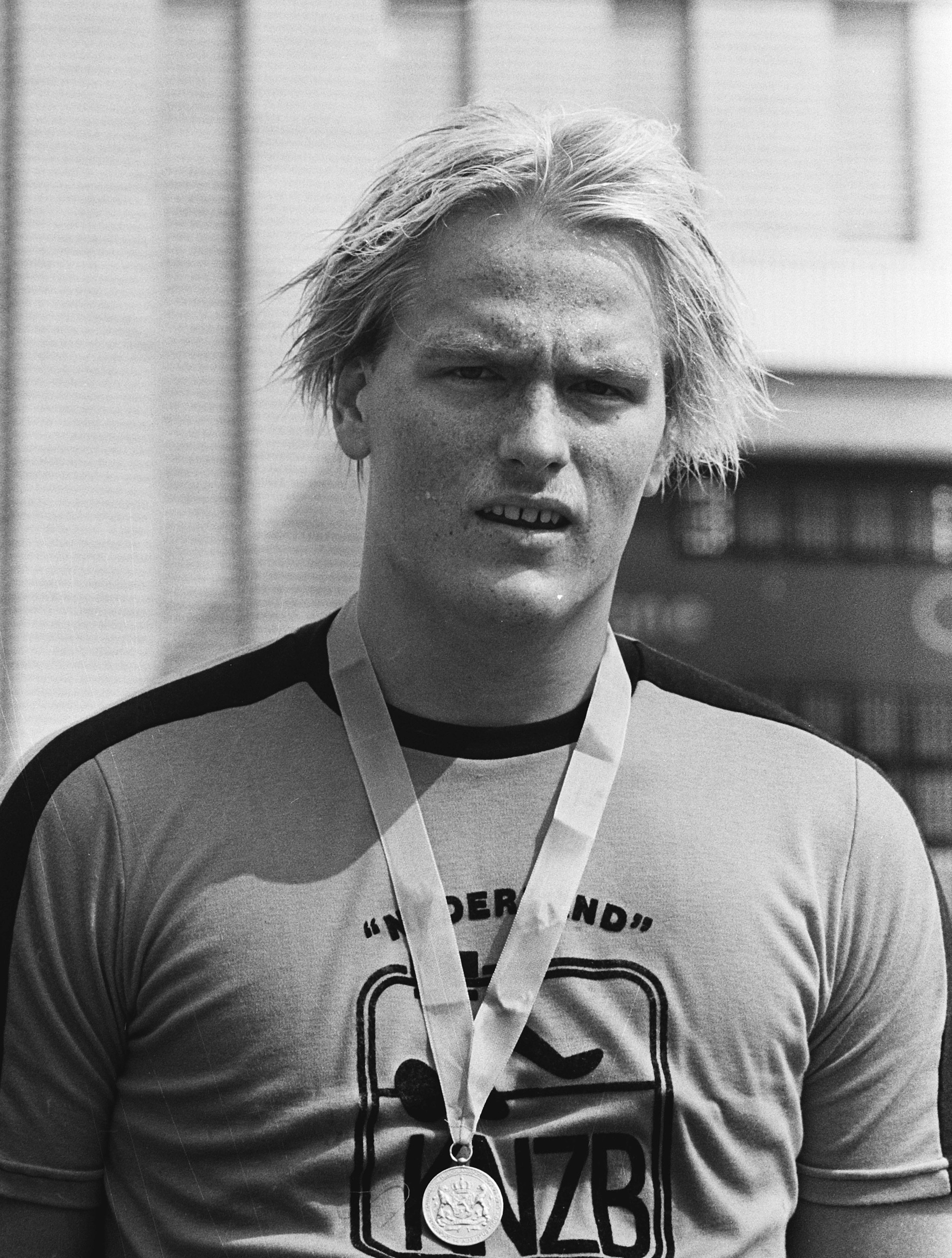
- Fred Eefting in 1979

Personal information
- Born: 14 February 1959 (age 67) Utrecht, the Netherlands
- Height: 1.83 m (6 ft 0 in)
- Weight: 94 kg (207 lb)

Sport
- Sport: Swimming
- Club: AZ&PC; de Otters; de Vechtstreek; Zwemlust den Hommel

Alfred Frederik "Fred" Eefting (born 14 February 1959) is a retired Dutch swimmer. He competed at the 1980 Summer Olympics in four events and finished sixth in the 100 m backstroke, fifth in the 200 m backstroke and seventh in the 4 × 100 m medley relay. Between 1977 and 1982 he won a national title in the 100 m backstroke (1979) and set several dozen national records in various backstroke, freestyle and medley disciplines.
