= Zoltán Wladár =

Hungarian swimmer

Personal information
- Nationality: Hungarian
- Born: 5 January 1960 (age 66) Budapest, Hungary

Sport
- Sport: Swimming

Zoltán Wladár (born 5 January 1960) is a Hungarian former swimmer. He competed at the 1976 Summer Olympics and the 1980 Summer Olympics.
