= Simon (surname) =

Simon is a surname.

Notable people with the surname include the following.

== A ==
- Abbey Simon (1920–2019), Jewish-American pianist
- Abram Simon (1872–1938), American rabbi
- Adam Simon or Ádám Simon, multiple people
- AJ Simon (1998–2024), American football player
- Al Simon (1911–2000), American producer
- Alan Simon, multiple people
- Albert Simon (1901–1956), Luxembourgish painter
- Alice Simon (1887–1943), German holocaust victim
- Alicja Simon, musician
- András Simon (born 1990), Hungarian footballer
- André Simon, multiple people
- Andrew Simon, American clarinetist
- Anna Simon, Spanish TV host
- Anna Simon, German trade unionist and politician
- Anne Simon, multiple people
- Antal Simon (born 1965), Hungarian football player and manager
- Attila Simon, multiple people

== B ==
- Barney Simon (1932–1955), South African editor, playwright, and director
- Barry Simon (born 1946), American mathematical physicist
- Barry Simon (politician) (1936–2004), Australian politician
- Ben Simon (born 1978), American ice hockey player
- Bénédicte Simon (born 1997), French footballer
- Bill Simon, multiple people
- Björn Simon (born 1981), German politician
- Bob Simon (1941–2015), American correspondent for CBS News
- Brian Simon (1915–2002), English educationist and historian
- Bryan W. Simon, American stage actor and film director

== C ==
- C. G. H. Simon, British government official
- Calvin Simon (1942–2022), American musician
- Carl Simon (born 1973), West Indian cricketer
- Carla Simón, Catalan film director
- Carlos Eugênio Simon (born 1965), Brazilian FIFA football referee
- Carly Simon (born 1943), American singer-songwriter and musician
- Carolin Simon (born 1992), German footballer
- Carrie Obendorfer Simon (1872–1961), American communal leader
- Cecile Paul Simon, French composer
- Charles Simon, multiple people
- Chase Simon (born 1989), American basketball player for Maccabi Ashdod of the Israeli Basketball Premier League
- Chibueze Christian Simon (born 2000), Nigerian footballer
- Chris Simon (born 1972), Canadian ice hockey player
- Christine Simon, stage name of Ina Wolf
- Chris Simon (1972–2024), Canadian ice hockey player
- Claude Simon (1913–2005), French novelist
- Cliff Simon (1962–2021), South African athlete and actor
- Cody Simon (born 2002), American football player
- Corey Simon (born 1977), American football player
- Cosette Simon (born 1953), American politician
- Craig Simon (born 1973), Australian rugby league footballer

== D ==
- Daniel Simon, German designer
- Daniel Simon, German paralympic swimmer
- Danny Simon (1918–2005), American television writer
- David Simon, multiple people
- Dean Simon (born 1960), American professional wrestler better known as Dean Malenko
- Denis Simon, American academic administrator
- Denise Simon, German professional golfer
- Dick Simon (born 1933), American racing driver
- Diederik Simon (born 1970), Dutch rower
- Diosdado Simón (1954–2002), Spanish biologist
- Dominik Simon (born 1994), Czech ice hockey player
- Dominique Simon (born 2000), Haitian footballer
- Dymond Simon (born 1989), American basketball player

== E ==
- Edgardo Simón (born 1974), Argentinian track and road cyclist
- Edward Simon, multiple people
- Eleazar ben Simon, 1st century Zealot leader
- Ella Simon, Australian aboriginal activist
- Ellen Simon, writer and daughter of Neil Simon
- Emil Simon (1936–2014), Romanian conductor and composer
- Émilie Simon (born 1978), French singer and composer
- Emmanuel Simon (born 1992), Papua New Guinean footballer
- Erin Simon, American soccer player
- Ernest Simon, multiple people
- Ernst Simon (1899–1988), German-Israeli Jewish educator
- Ernst Julius Walter Simon (1893–1981), British Sinologist
- Erwin Simon, German swimmer
- Eugene Simon, English actor
- Eugène Simon (1848–1924), French arachnologist
- Evan Simon, American football player

== F ==
- Francesca Simon (born 1955), Anglo-American author
- Francis Simon (born Franz Eugen Simon) (1893–1956), German/British physical chemist
- François Pascal Simon, Baron Gérard (1770–1837), French painter
- Frank Simon (1899–1956), English footballer

== G ==
- Gema Simon (born 1990), Australian soccer player
- George Simon, multiple people
- Geroy Simon (born 1975), Canadian football player
- Glyn Simon (1903–1972), Archbishop of Wales (1968–1971)
- Gilles Simon (born 1984), French tennis player
- Günther Simon (1925–1972), East German actor
- Gustav Simon (1900–1945), German Chief of the Civil Administration in Nazi occupied Luxembourg (1940–1945)
- Gustav Simon (physician) (1824–1876), German surgeon

== H ==
- Hanna Simon, Eritrean ambassador to France
- Harry Simon, multiple people
- Héctor Simón (born 1984), Spanish football manager and former player
- Heinrich Simon (1805–1860), German politician
- Heinrich Simon, German judaist
- Helmut Simon, German discoverer of Ötzi the Iceman
- Henri Simon (1866–1956), French army officer
- Henri Simon (marxist) (1922–2024), French Marxist
- Henry Simon, several people
- Henry Gustav Simon (1835–1899), German-British engineer
- Herbert Simon, multiple people
- Hermann Simon, German historian
- Howard Simon (1902–1979), American artist
- Hugh Simon, British actor

== I ==
- Ingo Simon (1875–1964), English archer, singer, and writer

== J ==
- Jacques Simon (disambiguation), multiple people
- James F. Simon (born 1938), American legal historian
- Janiel Simon (born 1981), Antigua and Barbuda footballer
- Jayci Simon (born 2005), American para-badminton player
- Jean-Claude Simon (born 1948), French research scientist
- Jeanne Hurley Simon (1922–2000), American politician
- Jed Simon (born 1964), Canadian musician
- Jennings Richard Simon (1929–2017), American psychologist and engineer, and namesake of the Simon Effect
- Jerry Simon (born 1968), American-Israeli basketball player
- Joanna Simon, multiple people
- Jocelyn Simon, Baron Simon of Glaisdale (1911–2006), British politician and QC
- Jody Simon (born 1956), American professional wrestler better known as Joe Malenko
- Joe Simon (1913–2011), Jewish-American comic book writer
- Joe Simon (musician) (1936–2021), American soul and R&B artist
- John Simon (disambiguation), multiple people
  - John Simon (1925–2019), American author and literary, film and drama critic
  - John Simon (record producer) (born 1941), American record producer for Columbia Records
  - Sir John Simon (doctor) (1816–1904), Chief Medical Officer for England, 1855–76
  - John L. Simon (Jack Simon), U.S. national swimming coach
- Joseph Minos Simon (1922–2004), American attorney
- Josef Simon (1930–2016), German philosopher
- Joseph Simon (disambiguation), multiple people
- Josette Simon (born 1960), British actress
- Joshua Simon (disambiguation), multiple people
- Juan Simón (born 1960), Argentine footballer
- Jules Simon (1814–1896), French statesman and philosopher
- Julia Simon (born 1996), French biathlete
- Julián Simón (born 1987), Spanish motorcycle racer
- Julian Lincoln Simon (1932–1998), American business professor
- Julio Simón (1940–2025), Argentine police officer and convicted criminal
- Július Šimon (born 1965), Slovak footballer
- Justin Simon (born 1996), American basketball player

== K ==
- K. V. Simon (1883–1944), Indian poet
- Kaleem Simon (born 1996), Montserrat footballer
- Kay Simon (born 1978), German canoeist
- Kay Simon (wine), American winemaker
- Kelvin Simon, Antiguan politician
- Kerry Simon, American celebrity chef
- Kevin Simon (born 1983), American football player
- Krisztián Simon (born 1991), Hungarian footballer
- Kyah Simon (born 1991), Australian football player
- Kyra Simon (born 2002), Australian rugby union player

== L ==
- Lawrence Simon (1933–1994), American professional wrestler better known as Boris Malenko (also father of Dean and Jody Simon, aka Dean and Joe Malenko)
- Leon Simon (born 1945), Australian mathematician, professor at Stanford
- Leon Simon (Zionist) (1881–1965), British intellectual and civil servant; President of the Hebrew University of Jerusalem
- Leslie Earl Simon (1900–1983), American scientist
- Lidia Șimon (born 1973), Romanian long-distance athlete
- Lou Anna Simon, American, President of Michigan State University
- Lowrell Simon (1943–2018), American singer (of The Lost Generation (band))
- Lucas Simón (born 1986), Argentine footballer
- Lucy Simon (1943–2022), American singer

== M ==
- Maouri Simon (born 2006), Indonesian footballer
- Marcel Simon (actor) (1872–1958), Belgian actor
- Maria Simon or Marie Simon, multiple people
- Marie Celeste Simon, American biologist and cancer researcher
- Marge Simon (born 1942), American artist and writer
- Márk Simon (born 1996), Hungarian footballer
- Matilda Simon, 3rd Baroness Simon of Wythenshawe (born 1955), first British transgender peer
- Matt Simon (born 1986), Australian soccer player
- Melissa Simon, American clinical obstetrician/gynecologist
- Melvin Simon (1926–2009), American real estate developer and film producer
- Melvin Simon (basketball) (born 1971), American professional basketball player
- Melvin I. Simon (born 1937), American molecular biologist and geneticist
- Michel Simon (1895–1975), Swiss actor
- Mickaël Simon (born 1987), French rugby league footballer
- Mike Simon (1883–1963), American baseball player
- Miles Simon (born 1975), American basketball player
- Moses Simon (born 1995), Nigerian footballer

== N ==
- Neil Simon (1927–2018), American playwright and screenwriter
- Norton Simon (1907–1993), American industrialist
- Nsana Simon (born 2000), French-Congolese footballer

== O ==
- Oliver Simon (1957–2013), German singer of the pop duo Mixed Emotions

== P ==
- Pál Simon (athlete) (1881–1922), Hungarian athlete
- Paul Simon, multiple people
- Peter Simon, multiple people
- Petra Simon (born 2004), Hungarian handball player
- Philipp Simon (born 1994), German footballer

== R ==
- Lady Rachel Simon (1823–1899), British writer
- Rachel Simon (born 1959), American writer
- Ralph Simon, South African business executive
- Randall Simon (born 1975), Major League baseball player from Netherlands Antilles
- Raymond Simon, American educator
- Richard Simon, multiple people
- Roberlandy Simon (born 1987), Cuban volleyball player
- Robert Simon, multiple people
- Roger Simon, multiple people
- Ronny Simon (born 2000), Dominican baseball player

== S ==
- S. J. Simon (1904–1948), British author
- Sam Simon (1955–2015), American television producer and writer
- Santiago Simón (born 2002), Argentine footballer
- Scott Simon, multiple people
- Shena Simon, Lady Simon of Wythenshawe (1883–1972), British politician, feminist, educationalist and writer
- Simone Simon (1910–2005), French film actress
- Sindee Simon, American chemical engineer
- Siôn Simon (born 1968), British Labour Party politician
- Stephen Simon (1937–2013), American conductor, composer, and arranger of classical music

== T ==
- T. F. Simon (1877–1942), Czech artist
- Taleena Simon (born 1992), Australian rugby league footballer
- Tamás Simon (1935–1956), Hungarian poet and playwright
- Tanya Simon, executive producer of 60 Minutes
- Ted Simon (born 1931), British journalist
- Theodore Simon (1872–1961), French psychologist
- Tibor Simon (1965–2002), Hungarian football player and manager
- Thomas Simon (1623–1665), English engraver
- Troy Simon (born 1980), Antiguan and Barbudan footballer
- Tyio Simon (born 1978), Antiguan and Barbudan footballer

== U ==
- Unai Simón (born 1997), Spanish footballer

== V ==
- Vicente Simón (born 1969), Spanish footballer
- Victor Simon Badawi (born 1980), Indonesian footballer
- Vincent Simon, multiple people
- Vinícius Simon (born 1986), Brazilian footballer

== W ==
- Walt Simon (1939–1997), American basketball player
- Walter Simon, multiple people
- William Simon, multiple people

== Y ==
- Yehude Simon (born 1947), Peruvian politician

== Z ==
- Zoe Kelli Simon (born 1965), American actress
- Zsolt Simon (born 1970), Slovak politician

== See also ==
- Simon (disambiguation)
- Baron Simon of Wythenshawe
- Saint-Simon
- Simone
- Simons
- Symon
