= Herman Berlinski =

American classical composer

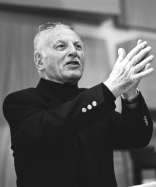
- Berlinski in 2000
- Born: 18 August 1910; Leipzig, Germany
- Died: 27 September 2001 (aged 91); Washington, D.C., U.S.
- Occupations: Composer, organist, musicologist and choir conductor
- Spouse: Sina Berlinski (née Goldfein)
- Children: David Berlinski

Herman Berlinski (18 August 1910 – 27 September 2001) was a German-born American composer, organist, pianist, musicologist and choir conductor.

== Life ==
=== Family background; early upbringing ===
Before he was born, Herman Berlinski's parents, Boris and Deborah Wygodzki Berlinski lived in the Jewish community of Łódź at the time when civil and political unrest was well underway in Russia from 1905, and growing discontent in Poland against the Russian rule had led to many uprisings. The largest of these, commonly called the June Days Uprising or the 1905 Łódź insurrection, took place in that same year.

At that point, the Berlinskis fled to Leipzig, where they remained after the end of World War I, for although Poland was reconstituted in 1918, turmoil between Poland and the Soviet States of Russia and Ukraine continued until early 1921 as Russia attempted to reclaim the territory that had belonged to it in the days of the empire. Furthermore, by contrast with the relative poverty he had experienced working as a factory labourer in Łódź, Boris Berlinski had been able to gain a stable income in Leipzig from haberdashery.

In any case, as Poland had regained its independent statehood, the Berlinskis retained their Polish nationality rather than facing the increasingly difficult task foreigners had in gaining German citizenship at that time, and with success made even less likely because they were Jews. In fact there was a strong probability, based on the experience of others, that the German authorities would classify them as "stateless", thereby stripping them of any citizenship and eliminating any rights they had as foreigners legally resident in the country.

Herman Berlinski, born there on 18 August 1910, was the last of six children. They were brought up in the Ashkenazic tradition of Orthodox Judaism and they spoke Yiddish at home. Their mother arranged piano lessons for each of them, Herman's starting at age six. He was educated at the Ephraim Carlebach School, Leipzig's only Jewish school at that time.

Deborah Berlinski died in 1920 leaving the children in the care of their father who never remarried. After observing the formal mourning period called shneim asar chodesh, Herman began private piano lessons under Bronya Gottlieb, a Polish-born woman and a gifted graduate of the Leipzig Conservatory.

=== Tertiary music studies in Leipzig ===
Having shown early talent in music and after winning a clarinet scholarship, Herman Berlinski commenced study at the Leipzig Conservatory in 1926 at the age of 17. His first year majors were clarinet and conducting, with piano as his minor. The following year he changed his major to piano, with theory as his minor.

His teachers there included Otto Weinreich (piano), Sigfrid Karg-Elert (theory), Günther Raphael (counterpoint) and Max Hochkofler (conducting). Fellow students included the Norwegian composer Geirr Tviett, and it is a sign of Berlinski's skills as a pianist that he gave the premiere performance in 1931 of Tveitt's dynamic First Piano Concerto. He graduated in 1932 with an honours degree. In the context of Leipzig's long involvement with European music, the strongest influences at that time on Berlinski's own composition style were J.S. Bach, Gustav Mahler and Max Reger.

His initial exposure to Lutheran liturgical music and the organ arose from attending Friday evening concerts at Leipzig's Thomaskirche where he heard repertoire largely centred on the period from J.S. Bach to Reger. Having overheard Berlinski rehearsing Bach's Goldberg Variations on the piano, Karl Straube, then cantor at the Thomaskirche and professor of organ at the Institut der Evangelisch-Lutherischen Landeskirche Sachsen, offered him organ lessons at the institute. But because it was a prerequisite that Berlinski become a Christian to have access to this program, and as he was not prepared to take that step, the idea proceeded no further.

=== Emigration to Paris; further music studies; professional involvement ===
As the National Socialist party gained power in German politics, general restrictions, including their involvement in the arts, were imposed upon the Jews. In 1933, having gained a Polish passport at his father's urging, Berlinski returned to Łódź. However, he found himself disadvantaged by being unable to speak Polish, and he was greatly disheartened by the misery of the Jewish community within which he was living. Finally, when called up for military service, he fled to Paris. He was then joined by Sina Goldfein, a former fellow-student both at school and the Leipzig Conservatory, herself a pianist and singer. They were married in 1934.

Soon after arriving in Paris, Berlinski enrolled at the École Normale de Musique and studied composition with Nadia Boulanger and piano with Alfred Cortot. Although he valued Boulanger's training, Berlinski eventually found some of her musical ideas incompatible with his own, discontinued studies with her after two years, and enrolled at the Schola Cantorum of Paris where he studied Jewish liturgical music with the Sephardic synagogue composer Léon Algazi and composition with Jean-Yves Daniel-Lesur. Through Daniel-Lesur he met other young composers who were members of the group called La jeune France. Most influential were Daniel-Lesur himself and Olivier Messiaen who, although strongly inspired by their Catholic background, encouraged Berlinski to explore and express his Jewish heritage.

From 1934 onwards, Berlinski became involved with a Jewish art theatre group known as the Paris Yiddish Avant-Garde Theatre (PIAT or PYAT) and made up largely of immigrants formerly involved with Yiddish theatre in Vilna. Their repertoire ranged from works by Jewish playwrights such as Sholem Aleichem and Isaac Leib Peretz to classic Russian plays presented in Yiddish translation. He was soon appointed as music director, a role in which he continued until 1939, and for this group he directed plays or conducted, performed, arranged and composed incidental music.

In this context, Berlinski met many Polish, Lithuanian and Ukrainian Jews who had been driven out of their own countries. This was highly influential on the development of his own music style and introduced him to many themes and ideas which he later explored in his compositions.

=== Military service in France; Nazi invasion; escape to the United States ===
With the outbreak of World War II in 1939, Berlinski offered to enter military service and joined the French Foreign Legion. At the end of almost a year, he was one of only 250 survivors out of 1,250 who had been assigned to battle on the Belgian border.

In 1940, after the surrender of France to the Germans, the newly established Vichy régime collaborated with the invaders by declaring certain groups including Freemasons, Communists and Jews as "undesirables". Thus, when Berlinski was demobilized in that same year, he received a certificate which declared him to be a "foreigner who had no right to work in France."

Facing the high risk of internment, Berlinski and his wife obtained visas and finally sailed to the United States, arriving in 1941. With them, they took only fragments of the compositions that he had written for the Yiddish theatre which they had been able to save from their ransacked Paris home. He would eventually draw on this material for works that he wrote after arriving in New York.

=== Life in New York City; advanced studies; professional development and career change ===
In New York City, Berlinski was reunited with his father who had escaped earlier from Germany, and other family members who had migrated from Łódź and were living in New Jersey. Herman and Sina Berlinski settled in Manhattan and their son David was born there in 1942. Berlinski first earned a living by giving private piano lessons, and quickly made contact with the city's large Jewish community.

A significant event in Berlinski's professional development was a meeting with Moshe Rudinow who was at that time cantor of New York's Temple Emanu-El, one of the city's leading Reform synagogues. Through Rudinow he was introduced to the then-named Jewish Music Forum, a body which was set up to promote the study and analysis of all aspects of Jewish music and to organize the performance of new music, and he became an invited member in 1944. There he met key musicians, composers and musicologists including Lazar Weiner, Joseph Yasser, Abraham Wolfe Binder and Lazare Saminsky. He also heard there the then young and relatively unknown Leonard Bernstein performing his new works including a piano reduction of his first symphony. He studied composition with Messiaen at the 1948 Tanglewood Music Center and gained from him an understanding of rhythmic and harmonic techniques which would affect his approach to using Jewish melodic forms in his later works.

A change in Berlinski's career occurred in 1951 when Yasser offered him organ lessons. As a result, he quickly demonstrated skill both as a recitalist and as a liturgical organist, setting the direction for the future both in terms of his professional appointments and the types of works which he composed. By 1954 he had been appointed as assistant organist at Emanu-El working with Saminsky as music director. He gave his first public recital the following year. He served there for a total of eight years, during which time he composed many works including choral and other liturgical music as well as organ pieces.

In 1953, while continuing his organ studies with Yasser, Berlinski undertook postgraduate studies at the Jewish Theological Seminary of America (JTSA) where he engaged in a musicological analysis of the origins and practices of ancient Jewish music. He also studied composition with Hugo Weisgall, an experienced composer who was descended from a long line of cantors and was interested in both sacred and secular Jewish music. Working with Weisgall and in the climate of the seminary provided an ideal stimulus for Berlinski to further explore and express his Jewish background, which in turn became more recognizable in his music.

Having completed his master's degree program at JTSA, Berlinski undertook doctoral studies in composition there. A major setback occurred in 1958 when he had a heart attack from which he made recovery and was able to complete his doctorate in 1960. This made him the first person to be awarded a doctorate in sacred music by that institution.

=== Move to Washington, D.C. ===
In 1963 Berlinski was named music director of Washington, D.C.'s Reform Hebrew Congregation where he worked under Rabbi Norman Gerstenfeld who was enthusiastic about contemporary music and who wanted the temple to be presenting the best sacred music in the city. Here he continued composing music for liturgical use as well as many other works, he was called upon widely to lecture and write on the subject of Jewish music, and he gave many organ recitals including appearances at Notre Dame Cathedral, Paris and Leipzig's Thomaskirche.

Rabbi Gerstenfeld died in 1968, ending five years which Berlinski described as being "the most exciting and creative" of his life. Rabbi Gerstenfeld's widow paid tribute to her husband by commissioning Berlinski to write the oratorio, Job. Berlinski continued as minister of music at the Washington Congregation until his retirement in 1977.

During those last years after Rabbi Gerstenfeld's death, requirements for Berlinski's liturgical music decreased, and he took the opportunity to compose larger vocal works and continued writing his sinfonias for organ with other instruments or singers. He lectured widely in the United States and Europe through his later career. Commitments included sessions at the Mendelssohn Academy in Leipzig under the auspices of the United States Information Agency, and at the Europäisches Zentrum für jüdische Musik (European Centre for Jewish Music), Hannover.

Berlinski was commissioned to create Ets Chayim (The Tree of Life), for the opening of The Precious Legacy at the Smithsonian.

=== Retirement; death ===
After his retirement in 1977, Berlinski remained in Washington and founded his own performing group, Shir Chadash Chorale, through which he was able to arrange the performance of much Jewish music in the city and the surrounding areas. This thirty-voice choir continued its work for eleven years, giving concerts of Hanukkah and other high holiday music annually in the John F. Kennedy Centre for the Performing Arts and the Washington National Cathedral.

In early 2000 Berlinski was invited by the Milken Archive to Berlin to participate in the first recording of Avodat Shabbat for release on the Naxos label as part of its Milken Archive of American Jewish Music series. Richard Sandler, Executive Vice President of the Milken Family Foundation reported:

It was very moving to be there. Mr Berlinski was visibly moved by the process. It was obviously one of the highlights of his career. Not only was the music being recorded for the first time, but it was also being recorded for the first time in Germany. Before each piece was recorded, he would explain to the performers in German what the prayer was about. They were fascinated.

Later that same year, his Sinfonia No. 12 (Die heiligen Zehn Gebote (These Holy Ten Commandments)), for organ, choir, soprano, tenor, baritone, two trumpets and percussion, received its world premiere in the Leipzig Thomaskirche, and was repeated at the Munich Hochschule with Berlinski present. In Munich the work received a standing ovation, and Professor Robert Helmschrott who was then President and Rector of the Munich Hochschule and to whom the sinfonia was dedicated, greeted Berlinski in a speech at the conclusion of the concert as "his spiritual father and his music as a link between Judaism and Christianity."

His last visit to Germany was early in 2001 after the Federal Republic of Germany had awarded him the Commander's Cross of the Order of Merit for his artistic achievements and his contribution to interfaith dialogue. (See below under Awards and Tributes for more details.)

Berlinski died at Washington's Sibley Memorial Hospital on 27 September 2001 after heart attacks and a stroke. His final composition, Psalm 130 (Shir hamaaloth (Out of the Depths)) for solo voice, choir and organ, had been commissioned by the Washington National Cathedral for the dedication of its last stained glass window. He had completed the work on 9 September, and it was first performed in the cathedral on 30 September, the day of his funeral.

== Compositions ==
=== Leipzig and Paris ===
There is no evidence of anything that Berlinski composed in Leipzig except in a comment made by Ann Williams Frohbieter in her doctoral thesis at Rice University where she said:

Berlinski was in danger not only because he was a Jew, but also because, in his early college days, he had composed music for a political cabaret ... writing music of a satirical nature.

A work known to have been composed in Paris was Chazoth, a theatrical piece for string quartet and ondes Martenot, which he wrote in 1938 and which had its premiere that year in the Salle Érard. Use of the then new and rather novel ondes Martenot probably came about because Daniel-Lesur, whose mother was a virtuoso performer on the instrument, had introduced Berlinski to its inventor Maurice Martenot. Having heard the work, Daniel-Lesur became a major advocate for Berlinski.

Another work, Allegretto grazioso con variazioni: Hommage à Ravel, for piano, also written in 1938, now exists in a revised version dated 1945 and held in The Herman Berlinski Music Collection (HBMC) at The Library of JTSA.

Apart from the handful of scores that Berlinski was able to carry with him from Paris, nothing else seems to have survived the destruction of the War.

=== New York ===
His first major works written in New York were suites all published under the title, From the World of My Father, and drawn in part from material on the fragmentary scores which he had been able to rescue from his home in Paris, but mostly from his memory of the melodies that he had heard or written in that period before the War. As Berlinski explained:

This was the music of my father's generation, now dedicated to the actors and actresses of the PIAT - almost all of them victims of the Holocaust. It will remain with me the rest of my life - for every sound in it evokes in me a name, a face, a smile, or a lament. If that is sentimental, so be it!

Under this general title, From the World of My Father, there are several suites for various instrumentations. The first (subtitled Chazoth (or Hatzot)) for chamber orchestra, written in 1941 and revised in 1995, has four movements, Prayer at Midnight, Procession, Legend, and Dance and is, as its subtitle suggests, related to the suite for string quartet and ondes Martenot which he composed in Paris in 1938. It also appeared later after several revisions as an Organ Suite also under the title, From the World of My Father, but with five movements listed in the HBMC catalogue as Prayer at Midnight (Chazoth), Air (Nigun), Nocturnal Procession, Legend and Ritual Dance.

The second suite, written in 1948, existed first in a version for cello and piano. Subtitled Dialogues, it has four movements, Dialogue, Hasidic, Nigun, and Wedding Dance. Later Berlinski arranged it for cello and chamber orchestra.

The third suite (subtitled Klezmorim) is for clarinet and chamber orchestra and has five movements, Lament, (Untitled), Mayouffes Dance Dance, Song, and Finale. Its date of composition is not known although the material would have originated from Berlinski's days in Paris. It was finally published in 1995 together with Suites Nos. 1 and 2 under the umbrella title, From the World of My Father: a trilogy for chamber orchestra, chamber orchestra and cello, chamber orchestra and clarinet.

Confusion may arise because there is another work carrying the title From the World of My Father: Suite No. 3, this one for oboe and organ. The HBMC catalogue shows it as having been written originally in 1938, rewritten in 1942 and revised in 1976, and it carries on the cover the alternate title, Peretz Suite: oboe or flute or clarinet and organ or piano, with an explanatory note from the composer, "From incidental music to stage plays by J.L. Peretz." According to the catalogue, there are four movements, Lament, Pastorale, Allegretto, and Song and finale, reflecting some parallels with the suite for clarinet and chamber orchestra mentioned in the previous paragraph.

Berlinski's next major work was Symphonic Visions, for orchestra, which he started writing in 1949 and completed the following year. It has four movements which he called Sinfonias, each based on a biblical extracts, the first from Psalm 94, the second and third from the Book of Jeremiah, and the fourth from the Song of Songs. The first three movements are centred on the themes of threat, destruction and war, while the final movement declares the blessing of new life.

His choice of themes reveals much of the impact of Berlinski's own experience through the persecution of his fellow Jews and of the War itself, and of his escape to the United States. This is revealed in his own words on the subject:

This is the century of mass destruction, of gas chambers, and the atomic bomb. Fear, sleeplessness, and melancholy have become the trademarks of our "displaced minds."... The projection of our own fears and worries, displaying and sharing them with those next to us, seems to alleviate our own suffering, making us realize that, although we are individuals, we are also part of a mass of people with similar emotions.

As he sees it, however, the artist has an important role to play in this:

The inclusion of sorrow and fear in the field of musical expression does not mean that one has to assume a continuously prophetical attitude with its implicit warning of approaching doom. Facing and including in music the realities surrounding us leaves us just at the point where the patient has told the doctor why and what he fears, which in itself will not cure him. In the realistic portrayal of a world in disorder, the artist, at least, must have a vision of order. His art will otherwise become as chaotic as the world around and within himself. But the urge for mental organization and for order cannot be satisfied by any complicated, philosophical equation. The answers must be simple and they must be unsophisticated, because truth and simplicity seem to be closely related in our minds.

His first major solo organ composition, The Burning Bush, illustrates this well, having been commissioned for use on Emanu-El's newly restored and extended Casavant organ. Robert Baker, an eminent musician and teacher who had succeeded Saminsky as Emanu-El's principal organist, gave the first performance in 1956, approved of the work, played it again the following year at the International Congress of Organists in London, and brought it to the public's attention by including it later in many of his recital programs. Frohbieter said in her doctoral thesis:

There is no other work like The Burning Bush written for the organ. The piece employed a rhapsodic, fiery, twentieth-century chromaticism and was the first serious Jewish work to be composed for the concert organ repertoire."

In 1958 Berlinski completed another major work, a Friday-evening service entitled Avodat Shabbat for cantor, choir and organ, which had been commissioned by Cantor David Putterman of New York's Park Avenue Synagogue who was cantor in its first performance there in that same year.

Some years later the work was being assessed for performance at Emanu-El and was submitted for examination by several musicians including Leonard Bernstein, who noted it to be "a fine compromise between tradition and somewhat contemporary sounds." Subsequently, Berlinski orchestrated and expanded the work for a concert performance conducted by Bernstein at New York's Lincoln Center for the Performing Arts in 1963.

Writing after the first recording of this work, critic Max Dudious said in Audiophile Auditions:

... the cantata [sic] offers a range of musical expression quite unexpected in the usually tradition-laden realm of liturgical writing. As a composition it is free and easy-going ...,

a statement which could be read as implying that labelling this or other works by Berlinski as strictly "liturgical" might limit their ability to attract a broader audience.

For his doctoral dissertation at JTSA, Berlinski composed a large oratorio, Kiddush Ha-Shem (Sanctification of the Name of God) for choir, soloists and orchestra, in memory of those murdered in the Holocaust. This work has not yet been performed in public.

In 1967, Berlinski finished a work begun in 1955-1956 by using some of the material which he had incorporated into Kiddush Ha-Shem, and created the Sinfonia No. 1, one of twelve. Subtitled Litanies for the persecuted, it is scored for narrator, contralto soloist and organ with a text drawn from poems by Shlomo Ephraim ben Aaron of Łęczyca, Solomon ibn Gabirol, the Book of Jeremiah, and Psalm 94. It has nine movements. Frohbieter says of this work:

The organ called for in the work is one of symphonic proportions, capable of expressing both the nuances of subtle shades of organ orchestral color and also the drama of powerful crescendos and decrescendos.

She then quotes Berlinski explaining something of the techniques on which he had drawn:

The music is expressive of the text. Under the influence of the twelve-tone school of German expressionism, I have expanded my harmonic palette considerably beyond the scope of Max Reger.

Sinfonia No. 2, subtitled Holy days and festivals, has an earlier origin in Berlinski's compositions than No. 1, having been commenced in 1954, shortly after he was appointed to the staff of Emanu-El, and completed in 1956. According to Berlinski's explanation to Frohbieter, when he first arrived at Emanu-El, there was no Jewish organ music suitable for use as preludes to worship apart from some pieces by Louis Lewandowski (which Berlinski described as "... very brave, nice ... most conventional ... and not typically Jewish.") Principal organist Baker, he said, was filling the gap by drawing upon the output of Bach, Mendelssohn and some French composers; but as these had been written for a Christian context, Berlinski thought they did not relate well to the Jewish calendar, and he saw it as desirable that he write a prelude for each of the holy days and festivals in a way "that a piece dedicated to [a holiday] would use melodies which are part of that holiday celebration."

Hence this sinfonia is made up of five movements, one for each of the holy days, Rosh Hashana (New Year) and Yom Kippur (the Day of Atonement), and one for each of the festivals, Sukkoth (Tabernacles), Pesach (Passover) and Shavuoth (Pentecost), with melodies drawn from what are called in the Ashkenazic tradition Missinai tunes. Although, in view of the traditional association between each Mis-sinai tune and a specific day in the Jewish calendar, each movement can be performed as an independent prelude on the appropriate day, Frohbieter points out that, because of the way Berlinski has constructed it, the entire sinfonia "coheres as one grand work ... a work of concert organ repertoire", the implication being that this work has potential use both as a recital piece and within the synagogue liturgy.

Sinfonia No. 3, subtitled Sounds and Motions for Organ, is a secular work, in the sense that it was designed to explore the full range of expressive capabilities of the symphonic organ. It was written in 1961 and dedicated to New York organist Claire Cocci, at that time organist of the New York Philharmonic, who had already heard The Burning Bush. She gave the premiere performance in New York that same year.

The work has six movements entitled Trumpets, Motion and Silence, Contemplation, Light Motion, Pulsation, and Polymodal Sounds and Motions, and Berlinski employs a variety of techniques - changing rhythmic patterns, chromaticism, contrasting consonance and dissonance, occasional use of the serialist approach, dramatic gestures and sudden silences - to express his thoughts and feelings.

A question regarding the inspiration of this work, by contrast with the overtly Jewish content of Sinfonias Nos. 1 and 2, comes into focus, however, when considering Berlinski's own explanation of Movement 1:

It is perhaps of little importance whether this music is, in any sense of the word, Jewish. The work speaks in a contemporary musical language, but I think that I can never divest myself of the shadow of the Holocaust. The signature instrument of Judaism throughout Israel's history has been the trumpet. The trumpets of this first movement are not the trumpets of the High Holidays. They are not trumpets of joy. The trumpets in Sinfonia No. 3 are trumpets of the Holocaust. They spell doom in cataclysmic events.

Likewise, the last movement, with the arresting subtitle Polymodal Sounds and Motions, a set of variations in chaconne form, derives its thematic material from modes called in Yiddish shtaygers which are used in Ashkenazic cantorial improvisation and take their names from the first words of the prayer with which they are most often used. The first is an altered Phrygian mode which is of widespread use in middle eastern music, and known commonly as Ahava Rabboh (the first line of that prayer in translation begins, "With abounding love hast thou loved us ...") or Freygish when used in Jewish liturgical prayer recitation and in Klezmer music. The second is called Mogen ovos or Magein avot, a natural minor mode (the first line of the prayer in translation being, "Our forebears' shield, reviver of the dead, incomparable Lord ...".

These two movements provide the parentheses for four others which reflect the breadth of Berlinski's inspiration and musical language, Movement 2, subtitled Motion and Silence, being just 28 bars in which phrase statements are followed by equal measures of silence, while Movement 3, Contemplation, which is in ternary form, begins with a quiet, reflective section followed by a build in energy which is finally resolved as the first section is repeated with some obvious elaborations. Of this movement, Berlinski said:

In 'Contemplation' I have composed a prayer which cannot be found in any liturgy. The music itself becomes the prayer.

The fourth movement, Light Motion, is a playful dance with strong reference to French symphonic organ writing, while the fifth movement, Pulsation, has a hypnotic repeated note pattern in the pedal part. According to Frohbieter, Berlinski drew a parallel between this movement and the heart attack which he had experienced four years before writing this work, with the abrupt ending of its first section representing the moment of the cardiac arrest itself.

=== Washington ===
Between his arrival in 1963 and his retirement in 1977, Berlinski concentrated largely on writing liturgical music for use at the Reform Hebrew Congregation. Two notable exceptions are Sinfonia No. 4, The Tetragrammaton, and Sinfonia No. 5.

Composition of Sinfonia No. 4, The Tetragrammaton for Organ and Orchestra, was started in New York, December 1962, and dated at final measure, 1 November 1965 (Washington, DC). The work is dedicated to Bethel Knoche, the organist at the RLDS Auditorium in Independence, Missouri. Knoche was a collaborator and student of Jewish liturgical music interpretation with Berlinski. The tetragrammaton are the three Hebrew letters used to represent the name of God. Berlinski selected three emotive attributes from the Sefirot for Sinfonia No. 4 and placed them in three parts for the composition: I. Keter (crown), II. Tiferet (beauty), and III. Gevurah (might). The work is written for trumpets I, II, III; horns I, II, III, IV; trombones I, II, III; tuba; harps I, II; piano; celesta; timpani; percussion; organ; violins I, II; viola; violoncello and double bass. Facsimile copies of Sinfonia No. 4 are housed at the Library of Congress and the Library of the Jewish Theological Seminary.

Sinfonia No. 5 for organ was composed between 1964 and 1968 and like the previous sinfonia was dedicated to Bethel Knoche, who premiered the work on the Auditorium organ in Independence, Missouri, on 6 May 1967.

This is a five movement work in which each movement is based on an excerpt from the poetry of Nelly Sachs taken from the collection entitled "O The Chimneys".

Berlinski recorded the poetry excerpts on his score against each movement as follows:

I. Footsteps – Age-old game of hangman and victim, persecutor and persecuted, hunter and hunted. "Auf dass die Verfolgten nicht Verfolger werden." (That the persecuted may not become persecutors). From "In the Habitations of Death".

II. Here amen must be said, this crowning of words which moves into hiding and peace. You great eyelid closing on all unrest, your heavenly wreath of lashes, you most gentle of all births. "Einer" (Someone). From "Flight and Metamorphosis".

III. The blood's circulation weeps toward its spiritual sea there where the blue flame of agony bursts through night. "Wan endlich" (When at last). From "Glowing Engimas II".

IV. Only death draws out of them the truth of misery, these recurring rhymes cut out of night's blackness, these reed exercises at the end of the organ of sounds. "Nur Sterben" (Only death). From "Glowing Enigmas I".

V. Footsteps - Which turn time ravenous emblazing the hour with wolves extinguishing the flight in the fugitive's blood. "Auf dass die Verfolgten nicht Verfolger werden" (That the persecuted may not become persecutors). From "In the Habitations of Death".

In 1969 Berlinski began his Sinfonia No. 10 for cello and organ, completing it in 1976. It has two movements, the second of which is a theme and set of variations based on the traditional memorial prayer melody, Av Ha-rachamim (Merciful Father).

Works from the earliest stage of his retirement include: a song cycle, Dost thou sleep, my brother Abel? (1979–1980); A Psalm of unity, commissioned in 1980 for the choir of St Margaret's Episcopal Church, Washington DC; Ein Musikalischer Spass: theme and variations from Mozart's Dorfmusikanten-Sextett, K. 522 (1983); Adagietto for flute and organ, and a Sonata for violin and piano: Le violon de Chagall, both in 1985.

Major works of this period included two commissions, Shevirath ha-kelim (The Breaking of the Vessels) commissioned by the Library of Congress for the fiftieth anniversary of Reichskristallnacht in 1988, and in the same year the Hanukah oratorio, The Trumpets of Freedom, which he wrote for performance by his Chir Chadash Chorale and other forces in the Kennedy Centre. After the premiere of The Trumpets of Freedom, critic Joan Reinthaler wrote in The Washington Post:

With his new Hanukah oratorio ... Herman Berlinski has affirmed his conviction that it is as important to celebrate victories as it is to remember tragedies.

In 1990 Berlinski wrote Maskir Neshamoth (In Remembrance of the Souls) which was commissioned by Ann and Donald Brown in memory of businessman Jules C. Winkelman, and its premiere was of excerpts only which were performed in 1998 at the Library of Congress for the sixtieth anniversary of Kristallnacht. He wrote a Cello Concerto between 1992 and 1994, a work which has yet to be performed.

In 1993 the Union Theological Seminary (UTS) asked him to write Das Gebet Bonhoeffers (The Prayer of Bonhoeffer), part of a longer work, Bonhoeffer-Triptychon, a tribute to a man who had been executed by the Nazis during the Second World War, for which other sections were co-commissioned from German composers Heinz Werner Zimmermann, a Protestant, and Robert Helmschrott, a Catholic. The work was premiered that same year at UTS, and has now been performed in many countries including Germany, the United Kingdom, Israel and South Africa.

Also in 1993, when he was commissioned to write a work for the groundbreaking ceremony for the synagogue about to be rebuilt in Dresden, called the New Synagogue, he reworked in German his oratorio, Job (under the title, Hiob). In 1995 he revised his unfinished 1983 cantata, The Beadle of Prague, incorporating it into the oratorio Etz Chayim (The Tree of Life).

A work of particular interest is called Celan, for narrator and piano, written in 2001 in memory of the Romanian-born poet and Holocaust survivor Paul Celan. Celan's prolific output included many works about the Holocaust. After the war he moved to Paris where, following many years of isolation and loneliness, he committed suicide in 1970. Berlinski constructed the work so poems are narrated between movements written for the solo piano. This dramatic work was first performed at Washington's United States Holocaust Memorial Museum a few weeks before Berlinski's death.

== Awards and tributes ==
Berlinski received many awards, honours and fellowships.

The first major award was a MacDowell Fellowship which he received in 1958. This assisted him in undertaking extensive musicological research.

In 1984 the American Academy of Arts and Letters honoured him with the Marjorie Peabody Waite Award, the citation reading: "Herman Berlinski is among the few 20th-century composers who have produced a significant body of music for the organ ..."

In 1992 he was granted the Shenandoah University and Conservatory Medal of Excellence, followed in 1995 by a Lifetime Achievement Award from the American Guild of Organists.

In the international arena, the then Federal Republic of Germany awarded him the Order of Merit which he received from the President in 1995, followed by the Commander's Cross of the Order of Merit which he received in 2001. The award letter for the Commander's Cross cited Berlinski as having been a builder of "many lasting bridges over the Atlantic", significant recognition from a former enemy against whom Berlinski had fought during the Second World War.

Considering the way Belinski had been treated by French authorities following his demobilization from the French Foreign Legion in 1940, leading to his urgent departure for the United States, it is ironic that he was decorated by the French Government with a Croix du combattant volontaire 1939–1945 after this award was created in 1954.

== Summary ==
The obituary by Martin Anderson published in The Independent began:

Herman Berlinski's deep involvement with Jewish liturgical music meant that his compositions didn't get the attention they deserve on the wider stage of concerts and recordings.

Parallels can be drawn between Berlinski and other composers whose reputations have been built so strongly on one part of their output that other equally important aspects have been ignored.

For example, Franz Liszt's fame as a pianist and his enormous output of virtuosic works for this instrument have distracted attention from his orchestral tone poems and symphonies, choral works and oratorios, chamber music and lieder.

The picture is similar with Max Reger whose organ works have long been in the mainstream of organists' repertoire, while his prolific output of solo piano music, concertos and other orchestral works, chamber music, choral works and lieder, with a small number of exceptions, has largely disappeared from public view.

Even closer to Berlinski's own situation, British composers Sir Charles Villiers Stanford and Herbert Howells whose contributions to Anglican church music have been in frequent use by choirs around the world, also wrote many other types of works - for orchestra, piano, chamber ensemble and so on - which have been all but forgotten.

A quick glance through a catalogue of Berlinski's works, even the selective listing below, quickly reveals that his music covers a broad range of formats - symphonic and chamber works, solo works for the organ, song cycles, numerous liturgical choral works and oratorios. Many of these works have been inspired by ideas related to his Jewish background and experience.

Berlinski addressed this subject:

I don't think I can write a piece of music, no matter what I do and what I will try, that does not have the stamp of my Jewish existence.

It would be misguiding though to assume that either Berlinski's Jewish identity or his close involvement with writing music for the synagogue would or should limit the appeal of his works in any way. As Frohbieter commented: "His music transcends parochial boundaries, to touch the souls of all mankind." In other words, Berlinski's music has something worthwhile to say to everyone.

A quick survey of Berlinski's works may suggest his propensity to dwell on Jewish suffering in general, and the Holocaust in particular. This drew leading American sociologist Joseph B Maier to ask him, "Could you tell me to what extent you are a composer concerned with the Holocaust, and how does it show in your work?" To which Berlinski replied:

I cannot suppress a continuous urge to come back to it again and again. I may be haunted by the fear that time will mollify the intensity of our memory, that the event will be forgotten altogether. Elie Wiesel once said, 'Memory is our strongest weapon.' I do not need the Holocaust to create music. Those who have been silenced by it need us.

It is clear then that Berlinski was not preoccupied with his own tribulations, nor lamenting those of his fellow Jews, or anyone else for that matter, who had suffered at the hands at the hands of others. His argument appears to be that, by remembering the pointless and unjustifiable outcomes of persecution, humankind may be motivated to avoid the same stumbling blocks.

Much of Berlinski's music expresses a sense of triumph in the face of affliction. His belief in that principle appears not only in the themes and ideas that he explored in his music but also in the way he lived. In view of the tortuous path that led him from his place of birth, Leipzig, via his parents' home country, Poland, to France which was then overtaken by Germany's Nazi forces, and finally to the United States, it is notable that he should have had the wisdom, insight and strength of purpose that would allow him to do so.

== Significant works ==
- (1938) Chazoth, suite for string quartet and Martenot (rev. 1982 as From the World of My Father: Suite for organ in five movements)
- (1938, rev. 1945) Allegretto grazioso con variazioni: Hommage à Ravel (piano)
- (1938–1976) From the World of My Father, suite No. 3 for oboe and organ (Also having the alternate title, Peretz Suite for oboe or flute or clarinet and organ or piano)
- (1941, rev. 1981) Sonata for flute and piano
- (1941, rev. 1995) From the World of My Father, for chamber orchestra
- (1944) Sonata brevis for piano
- (1946–1948, 1971. German version 1974) Sinfonia No. 7: David and Goliath, for tenor and organ (Text from I Samuel:17-18)
- (1948) The City, four songs for high voice and piano (Poems by James Agee, Jessie Ward Haywood, Annie Hatch Boornazian, and Jessie Wilmore Murton)
- (1948) Hassidic Suite for cello and piano (rev. 1948-1969 as Hassidic Suite for cello and organ. Also published as From the World of My Father, Suite No. 2 for cello and piano, and arranged in 1995 for cello and chamber orchestra)
- (1949–1950) Symphonic Visions, for orchestra
- (1950–1951) Concerto da camera for flute, oboe, clarinet, bassoon, piano, timpani and string orchestra
- (1950–1979) Four "Irreverent" Songs, for soprano and piano (Poems by Ogden Nash, Samuel Hoffenstein, and Anon.)
- (1950, rev. 1985) Return, a cycle of four songs for baritone and piano (Poems by Walter de la Mare, Demetrios Capetanakis, Karl Shapiro, and Conrad Aiken)
- (1952) Quadrille, for flute, oboe, clarinet and bassoon
- (1953) Lecho dodi, for cantor, choir (SATB) and organ (ad libitum)
- (1953) String Quartet
- (1954–1956) Sinfonia No. 2: Holy days and festivals, for organ
- (1956–1959) Kiddush Ha-Shem (Sanctification of the Name of God), for cantor (baritone), solo voices, choir (SATB) and orchestra
- (1955–1956, 1967) Sinfonia No. 1: Litanies for the persecuted, for narrator, contralto and organ (Texts from the litany, "Eleh es'keroh" (This, I will remember) by Shlomo Ephraim ben Aaron of Łęczyca, Psalm 94, Jeremiah 4 and poems by Solomon ibn Gabirol)
- (1956) The Burning Bush, for organ
- (1956) Entreat me not, for choir and organ (Text from Ruth 1:16)
- (1957) V'shomru, for cantor (medium-voice), soprano, contralto, choir (SATB) and organ
- (1958) Avodat Shabbat (Friday Evening Service), for cantor (high or medium voice), choir (SATB) and organ
- (1959) Three Sacred Songs, for high voice and organ or piano (Texts in Hebrew and English from the Hebrew liturgy)
- (1960) Psalm 23, for high voice and flute
- (1961) Litany of Shlomo Ephraim ben Aaron, Eleh eskeroh (This, I will remember), for cantor (tenor or baritone), choir (SATB) and piano or organ
- (1962) Sinfonia No. 3 (Sounds and motions), for organ
- (1962) Kol nidre, for cantor, optional mixed choir and organ
- (1962) Kol nidre, for organ
- (1962–1965) Sinfonia No. 4: The Tetragrammaton, for organ and orchestra
- (1962, rev. 1983) Kol nidre, for cello and organ (Used in 1968 as the 2nd movement of Un'saneh tokef (Days of Awe))
- (1963) Entreat me not, for contralto, choir (SATB) and organ or piano (Text from Ruth 1:16)
- (1964) Sinfonia No. 5: On poetry by Nelly Sachs, for organ
- (1964) Sing joyfully, for choir (SATB), organ and obligato trumpet (Texts from Psalm 81 and the High Holiday Prayerbook)
- (1964) Shofar Service, for shofar, tenor or baritone, choir (SATB), two trumpets and organ (Used in 1968 as 1st movement of Un'saneh tokef (Days of Awe))
- (1965) Elegy: In memory of Albert Einstein, for organ
- (1966) The earth is the Lord's, Charleston Festival cantata, for choir (SATB), baritone, soprano, contralto, organ, 2 trumpets and percussion
- (1967, rev. 1986) And her children rise up and call her blessed, cantata for soprano, contralto, baritone, tenor, choir (SATB), percussion, timpani, harp, harpsichord and organ (Texts from The Bible, the Union Prayer Book, Chaya Feldman's Last Letter and The diary of a young girl by Anne Frank)
- (1968, rev. 1985) Un'saneh tokef (Days of Awe), cantata for narrator, tenor or baritone, choir (SATB), clarinet, trumpets, organ, timpani, percussion and shofar (Text by Meshullam ben Kalonymus)
- (1968–1972, rev. 1984–1985) Job, a music drama for two speaking voices, five soloists, choir (SATB) and orchestra (Texts from The Bible (Soncino Edition), The Book of Job by Moses Buttenwieser, and the poetry of Nelly Sachs)
- (1968, rev. 1979) Sinfonia No. 6: Prayers for the night, for organ, strings and timpani
- (1972) Sinfonia No. 8: Eliyahu (Theme and variations on the traditional Passover tune Eliyahu ha-nav), for organ ((1995–1996) Scored as a symphonic poem for large orchestra)
- (1974) Sinfonia No. 9: After Hermann Hesse's Das Glasperlenspiel (The Glass Bead Game), for narrator, contralto, organ, ten instruments, percussion and timpani
- (1975–1976) Sinfonia No. 10, for cello and organ
- (1975) The death of Rachel, cantata for narrator, baritone, soprano, organ and bells (Text from Genesis)
- (1976) David's harp, cantata for choir (SATB), baritone and organ (Text by Rabbi Victor E. Reichert)
- (1978) Sinfonia No. 11 for violin and organ
- (1979–80) Dost thou sleep, my brother Abel?, song cycle for soprano, flute and cello (Texts by Peretz Hirschbein, Itzik Manger, Isaac Leib Peretz, Kadya Molodowsky, A. Lutzky, Rachel Korn, Jacob Isaac Segal, Karl Wolfskehl, Eliyahu (Eliahu or Eliah) Rudiakow and Lottie Rudiakow)
- (1980) A Psalm of Unity, for mixed choir, organ, soprano, two contraltos and mezzo-soprano (Text from Psalm 140 and Psalm 133)
- (1980–1995) Etz Chayyim (Tree of Life), oratorio for two actors, narrator, dancers, soprano, contralto, baritone, choir (SATB) and chamber orchestra (Text included poetry by Paul Celan, Kadya Molodowsky, Nelly Sachs, Karl Wolfskehl, and Jules Wein, and excerpts from the Kabbalah and the High Holiday Prayerbook) (In the 1995 revision, Berlinski included sections from The Beadle of Prague (1983))
- (1983) Ein Musikalischer Spass, theme and variations from W.A. Mozart's Dorfmusikanten-Sextett, K. 5
- (1983) The Beadle of Prague (Later adapted to become part of the 1995 revision of Etz Chayyim (see 1980–1995))
- (1983) Adagietto for flute and organ
- (1985) Sonata for violin and piano: Le violon de Chagall
- (1988) Shevirath ha-kelim (The Breaking of the Vessels), a piyyut for organ, soprano, vibraphone, drum, cymbals and gong
- (1988) The Trumpets of Freedom, oratorio for narrator, soprano, contralto, tenor, bass, choir (SATB), children's choir; orchestra, organ and harpsichord (Text from the Book of Maccabees and the High Holiday Prayerbook)
- (1990) Maskir Neshamot (In Remembrance of the Soul), memorial cantata for soprano, contralto, tenor, baritone, flute, percussion, string quartet and organ
- (1993) Das Gebet Bonhoeffers (The Prayer of Bonhoeffer) (Part of Bonhoeffer-Triptychon), cantata for soprano, baritone, choir (SATB), flute, cello, organ, celesta, vibraphone, crotales and gongs (Text from the Song of Songs (Buber-Rosenzweig translation); Psalm 103 (Buber-Rosenzweig translation) and Widerstand und Ergebung by Dietrich Bonhoeffer)
- (1992–1994) Concerto for cello and orchestra
- (1993) Hiob, oratorio (Version in German of Job (1968–1972))
- (1997) Variations on the Song "Allnächtlich im Traume", Op. 86 No. 4 by Felix Mendelssohn-Bartholdy, for violin, cello and piano
- (2000) Sinfonia No. 12: Die heiligen Zehn Gebote (These Holy Ten Commandments), for tenor, baritone, narrator, chorus, two trumpets, percussion, celeste and organ (Text from the Ten Commandments, the High Holiday Prayerbook and the History of the three good acts by Isaac Leib Peretz)
- (2001) Celan, for piano and narrator (Poetry by Paul Celan is read by the narrator between each of the work's 13 movements)
- (2001) Quintet for clarinet and string quartet
- (2001) Psalm 130 (Shir hamaaloth), for choir (SATB), mezzo-soprano, narrator, trumpet solo and organ

== Recorded works ==
- Adagietto for flute and organ
  - Frances Shelly, flute; Steven Egler, organ (Summit Records CD-174)
- Avodat Shabbat (Friday Evening Service)
  - Robert Brubaker, tenor; Constance Hauman, soprano; Elizabeth Shammash, mezzo-soprano and cantor; Ernst Senff Choir; Berlin Radio Symphony Orchestra; Gerard Schwarz, conductor (Naxos 8.559430; Milken Archive Digital, Echoes of Ecstasy, Volume 7, Masterworks of Prayer: Art in Worship. MAV0705)
- Das Gebet Bonhoeffers (The Prayer of Bonhoeffer)
  - Nancy Gibson, soprano; Matthias Weichert, bass; Olaf Georgi, flute; Bernhard Hentrich, cello; Holger Miersch, celesta; Hermann Berlinski, organ; Martin Homann, percussion; Dresdner Kammerchor; Hans-Christoph Rademann, conductor (Vienna Modern Masters VMM 3027)
- From the World of my Father: Suite No 1 (Chazoth)
  - Seattle Symphony; Gerard Schwarz, conductor (Naxos 8.559446; Milken Archive Digital, Volume 6, Echoes of Ecstasy: Hassidic Inspiration. MAV0601)
- From the World of My Father: Suite No 2 (Dialogues)
  - Steven Honigberg, cello; Carol Honigberg, piano (Albany TROY157)
- Shevirath Ha-kelim (The Breaking of the Vessels)
  - Steven C. Berke, hazzan; Elizabeth S. Berke, cantor; Kathinka Lorger, organ; Fabio Romano, piano (Deutsche Harmonia Mundi 05472 77388 2 1)
- Return, a song cycle for baritone & piano
  - Donald Boothman, baritone; Herman Berlinski, piano (CRI NWCR839)
- Shofar Service
  - BBC Singers; Ted Christopher, baritone; James Ghigi, trumpet; Stephen Keavy, trumpet; Tim Roseman, shofar; Christopher Bowers-Broadbent, organ; Avner Itai, conductor (Naxos 8.559446; Milken Archive Digital, Echoes of Ecstasy, Volume 7, Masterworks of Prayer: Art in Worship. MAV0705)
- Sinfonia No. 10 for cello & organ
  - Lori Barnet, cello; Herman Berlinski, organ (CRI NWCR839)
- Sonata for flute and piano
  - Jody Schwarz, flute; Mina Miller, piano (Innova Recordings IN578)
- The Burning Bush
  - Catharine Crozier, organ (Fleur de Lis CD-FL-0601-2)
  - Barbara Harbach, organ (Naxos 8.559446)
  - Herndon Spillman, organ (Titanic Records Ti-205)
- Symphonic Visions for Orchestra
  - Barcelona Symphony and Catalonia National Orchestra; Gerard Schwarz, conductor (Naxos 8.559446; Milken Archive Digital, Echoes of Ecstasy, Volume 11, Symphonic Visions: Orchestral works of Jewish Spirit. MAV1103)
  - Asahi Orchestra of Tokyo; Richard Korn, conductor (CRI NWCRL115)

== Bibliography ==
- Anderson, Martin. "Herman Berlinski" in The Independent, Saturday, 15 December 2001.
- Berlinski, David (Ed.). A Guide to the Compositions of Herman Berlinski, Herman Berlinski Collection of the Jewish Theological Seminary, 1989.
- Frohbieter, Ann Williams. The Early Organ Sinfonias of Herman Berlinski, DMA Thesis, Rice University, 2001.
- "Jewish music", in Sadie, Stanley (Ed.). The New Grove Dictionary of Music and Musicians, Vol 9, Macmillan Publishers Limited, 1980, pp. 614–645.
- Kahn, Eliott. "Remembrance and Renewal: Interview with Sina Berlinski", excerpts of a conversation between the late composer's wife and JTS music archivist Eliott Kahn in The Jewish Theological Seminary - Remembrance and Renewal: Interview with Sina Berlinski
- Kalib, Sholom. The Musical Tradition of the Eastern European Synagogue: Vol. 1, Introduction: History and Definition, Syracuse University Press, 2002.
- Kennedy, Michael and Bourne, Joyce. "Berlinski, Herman" in The Concise Oxford Dictionary of Music, Oxford University Press, 1996.
- Kratzenstein, Marilou. "The Organ Works of Herman Berlinski", in The American Organist, April 1989.
- Langer, Ruth. To Worship God Properly: Tensions Between Liturgical Custom and Halakhah in Judaism, Hebrew Union College Press, 2005.
- Maier, Joseph. The Religious Significance of Herman Berlinski's Music: A Dialogue Between Joseph Maier and the Composer, Unpublished, 1991.
- Reinthaler, Joan. "The Blare of 'Trumpets'" in The Washington Post, Tuesday, 6 December 1988.
- Straus, Joseph N. "The Myth of Serial "Tyranny" in the 1950s and 1960s" in The Musical Quarterly, Oxford University Press, Vol. 83, No. 3, Autumn, 1999.
