= Robert Simons =

Robert Simons may refer to:

- Robert Simons (cricketer)
- Robert Simons (economist)

== See also ==
- Robert Simon (disambiguation)
