= Charles Simmons =

Charles Simmons may refer to:

- Charles Simmons (gymnast) (1885–1945), British Olympic gymnast
- Charles Simmons (author, born 1924) (1924–2017), American editor and novelist
- Charles Simmons (author, born 1798) (1798–1856), American clergyman and author
- Charles Simmons (politician) (1893–1975), British lecturer, journalist and politician
- Charles F. Simmons (politician) (1858–1897), American farmer and politician
- Charles F. Simmons (footballer) (1880–1911), English footballer with Athletic Bilbao and Real Sociedad
- Chippy Simmons (Charles Simmons, 1878–1937), English footballer with West Brom, West Ham and Chesterfield
- Charles Simmons (American football) (1931–2020), American football coach and college athletics administrator

== See also ==
- Charles Simons (disambiguation)
