= WRJ =

WRJ may refer to:

- Women of Reform Judaism, the women's affiliate of the Union for Reform Judaism
- WRJ, the Amtrak station code for White River Junction station, Vermont, United States
