= David Simons =

David Simons may refer to:

- David G. Simons (1922–2010), American physician and U.S. Air Force officer who set a record of high-altitude balloon flight
- J. David Simons (born 1953), Scottish novelist and short story writer
- David Simons, developer of Simons' BASIC
- Dave Simons (1954–2009), American comic book artist
- D. Brenton Simons, president and CEO of the New England Historic Genealogical Society

== See also ==
- David Simon (disambiguation)
- David Simmons (disambiguation)
