= George Simon =

George Simon may refer to:

- George T. Simon (1912–2001), American jazz writer
- George Simon (athlete) (born 1942), sprinter from Trinidad and Tobago
- George Simon (artist) (1947–2020), Lokono Arawak artist and archaeologist from Guyana
- George K. Simon (born 1948), self-help book author

== See also ==
- George Simion, Romanian right-wing politician and civic activist
