= Abram Simon =

American Reform rabbi

Abram Simon (July 14, 1872 – December 24, 1938) was an American Reform rabbi who mostly ministered in Washington, D.C.

== Life ==
Simon was born on July 14, 1872, in Nashville, Tennessee, the son of David Simon and Rachel Lederhandler. He moved with his parents to Cincinnati, Ohio, when he was young.

Simon graduated from the University of Cincinnati with a B.L. in 1894, and in that same year he was ordained a rabbi by Hebrew Union College. He then served as rabbi of Congregation B'nai Israel in Sacramento, California, from 1894 to 1899, followed by Temple Israel in Omaha, Nebraska, from 1899 to 1904. He became rabbi of the Washington Hebrew Congregation in Washington, D.C., in the latter year, and he served as rabbi there until his death. While in Washington, he was among the first to have separate services for college students. He received a Ph.D. from George Washington University in 1917, and in 1925 he received an honorary D.H.L. from Hebrew Union College. He was the first rabbi of the Washington Hebrew Congregation, his predecessor having been a hazzan.

During World War I, Simon was a Red Cross Officer who served in France and was attached to the 304th Sanitary Train of the 79th Division. He formed a branch of the Society a branch of the Society for the Prevention of Cruelty to Children and Animals while living in Sacramento, and in Omaha he took post-graduate courses in philosophy and education at the University of Nebraska. He was president of the Washington, D.C., Board of Education from 1920 to 1923, president of the Central Conference of American Rabbis from 1923 to 1925, a founder of the Synagogue Council of America in 1928, and an organizer of the Washington chapter of the National Conference of Christians and Jews. In 1929, he was appointed a non-Zionist member of the council of the Jewish Agency. In 1912, he and William Rosenau wrote History of Jewish Education.

He advocated for a tolerant, liberal society that he believed to be the necessary guardian of free thought.

Simon was a faculty member of the short-lived Correspondence School of the Jewish Chautauqua Society for the Training of Teachers. He was a founding member of the Reform movement's Committee on Jewish Education. He was a trustee of the Jewish Chautauqua Society and president of the Columbia Hospital for Women from 1921 to 1927 and of the Public Library from 1929 to 1933. In 1896, he married communal leader Carrie Obendorfer. They had two children, Leo and David. Leo worked as a lawyer but died in 1926 at the age of 28.

Simon died from a heart attack at his apartment in the Shoreham Hotel shortly after conducting services on December 24, 1938. Washington rabbis, members of the Protestant and Catholic clergy, and delegates from educational and social organizations were among those who attended his funeral at the Washington Hebrew Congregation. Rabbi Norman Gerstenfeld officiated the funeral service. Other clergymen who participated in the funeral service included Bishop James E. Freeman and Canon Anson Phelps Stokes of the Washington Cathedral, Hebrew Union College president Dr. Julian Morgenstern, Rabbi William Rosenau of Baltimore and representative of the Central Conference of American Rabbis, and Washington Committee on Religious Life chairman Dr. Albert Joseph McCartney of the Covenant First Presbyterian Church. He was buried in the Washington Hebrew Congregation Cemetery.

In 1949, the Washington D.C. Board of Education named an elementary school after him.
