= Joe Simon (disambiguation) =

Joe Simon (1913–2011) was an American comic book writer.

Joe Simon may also refer to:

- Joe Simon (singer) (1936–2021), R&B musician
- Joe Simon (born 1956), wrestler known as Joe Malenko
- Joe Simon (director) (1947/1948–2026), Kannada film director, writer, actor and lyricist
- J. Minos Simon (1922–2004), American author, lecturer, aviator, and attorney

== See also ==
- Joseph Simon (disambiguation)
