= Walnut, Quitman County, Mississippi =

Unincorporated community in Mississippi, United States

Walnut, Mississippi
- Unincorporated community
- Location within Mississippi Location within the United States
- Coordinates: 34°08′56″N 90°23′56″W
- Country: United States
- State: Mississippi
- County: Quitman
- Elevation: 161 ft (49 m)
- Time zone: UTC-6 (Central (CST))
  - Summer (DST): UTC-5 (CDT)
- Area code: 662
- GNIS feature ID: 692305

Walnut is an unincorporated community in Quitman County, Mississippi. Walnut is located on Mississippi Highway 322, southwest of Lambert.

The Parker family was murdered in Walnut in 1990.
