= Richard Simon =

Richard Simon may refer to:

- Richard Simon (priest) (1638–1712), French priest, Oratorian and biblical critic
- Richard Simon (painter) (1898–1993), German expressionist
- Richard L. Simon (1899–1960), American businessman and co-founder of the publishing house Simon & Schuster
- Dick Simon (born 1933), American racing driver
