= Alicja Simon =

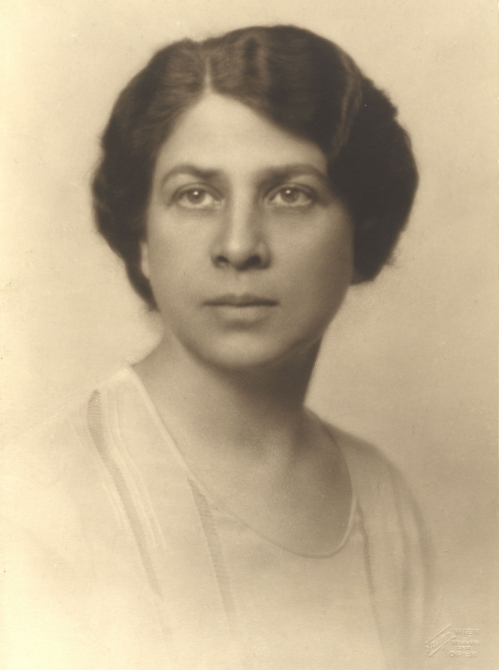
- Portrait by Georg Fayer. March 1927.

Background information
- Born: November 13, 1879; Warsaw
- Died: May 23, 1958; Łódź
- Occupation: musicologist

Alicja Simon, also known as Alicja Simonówna, Alice Simon (born November 13, 1879 in Warsaw, died May 23, 1958 in Łódź) was a Polish musicologist of Jewish origin, a professor at the University of Łódź.

== Biography ==
Alicja Simon studied music at the Conservatory of Music in Warsaw, and then musicology at the Frederick William University under Hermann Kretzschmar in Berlin (1904–1909), where she also studied philosophy, psychology, and art history. She then attended the University of Zurich, where in 1914 she earned a doctorate with a dissertation on Polish elements in German classical music. From 1920 to 1923, she worked in the M. Breslauer antiquarian bookshop in Berlin and at the International Labour Organization in Geneva. From 1924 to 1928, she was the head of the music department at the Library of Congress in Washington, D.C. Between 1928 and 1939, she worked as a lecturer in musicology at the Free Polish University in Warsaw and was a curator of the Aleksander Poliński collection at the Directorate of State Art Collections. During World War II, she organized underground education. From 1945, she worked as an assistant and lecturer in musicology at the University of Łódź. In 1954, she became a full professor of musicology at the university.

Her musical activities included promoting Polish music abroad, particularly from 1924 to 1939 when she gave numerous lectures on the subject. As a musicologist, she analyzed the relationships between Western (primarily German) and Polish music in her works. She published in Polish, German, and English.

She was a member of the Łódź Scientific Society and the Polish Composers' Union and the Fryderyk Chopin Society.

She was buried at the Powązki Cemetery in Warsaw.

== Awards ==
- Medal of the 10th Anniversary of People's Poland (1955)
