= Scott Simon (disambiguation) =

Scott Simon is an American journalist.

Scott Simon may also refer to:

- Scott Simon (politician) (born 1961), Republican member of the Louisiana House of Representatives
- Screamin' Scott Simon (1948–2024), piano player for Sha Na Na

== See also ==
- Scot Symon, Scottish footballer
- Simon (surname)
