= Charles Simons =

Charles Simons may refer to:

- Charles C. Simons (1876–1964), American judge
- Charles Earl Simons Jr. (1916–1999), American judge
- Charles Simons (footballer) (1906–1979), Belgian footballer
- Charles J. Simons (1843–1914), United States Army officer and Medal of Honor recipient

== See also ==
- Charles E. Simons Jr. Federal Court House, Aiken, South Carolina
- Charles Simon (disambiguation)
- Charles Simmons (disambiguation)
