= Stella Heinsheimer Freiberg =

Stella Heinsheimer Freiberg (November 29, 1862 - January 20, 1962) was an American patron of the arts and society figure.

Stella Heinsheimer was born the fifth of six children in Cincinnati. She was the daughter of a well-off family of German Jews, and through them early developed her ties to Reform Judaism. She received an education suited to teaching music prior to marrying businessman J. Walter Freiberg, president of the Union of American Hebrew Congregations; the couple had one son, Julius. Stella, too, soon became active in the Reform movement, establishing the National Federation of Temple Sisterhoods, of which she served as vice-president from 1913 to 1923, and president from 1923 to 1929. In 1923 she secured money to build a dormitory and donate a gymnasium for Hebrew Union College. She sat on the board of the National Council of Jewish Women and that of Jewish Social Agencies in Cincinnati. In 1894 she was one of the ten women who established the Cincinnati Symphony Orchestra, later serving as that organization's vice-president. She often hosted musical salons in her house, featuring performers such as Arthur Rubenstein, Leonard Bernstein, and George Gershwin; she also "scribbled" music for the piano, though none of it was published. In the 1930s she served as director of the Cincinnati Art Museum, and in the 1940s she opened a business, At Your Service, which provided catering services for musical affairs. She remained an independent businesswoman past the age of 80.
