= David Simmons =

David Simmons may refer to:

== Politicians ==
- David Simmons (judge) (born 1940), politician and Chief Justice of Barbados
- David Simmons (Australian politician) (born 1947), former member of the Australian House of Representatives
- David Simmons (Florida politician) (born 1952), American politician in Florida

== Sports ==
- David Simmons (rugby league) (born 1984), Australian rugby league player
- Dave Simmons (basketball, born 1959), American basketball head coach for McNeese State University men's basketball team
- Dave Simmons (basketball, born 1963), American basketball player who played majority of career in the Australian NBL
- Dave Simmons (footballer) (1948–2007), English footballer
- Dave Simmons (linebacker, born 1943) (1943–1994), American football player for the St. Louis Cardinals, New Orleans Saints, and Dallas Cowboys
- Dave Simmons (linebacker, born 1957), American football player for the Green Bay Packers, Detroit Lions, Baltimore Colts and Chicago Bears
- David Simmons (rower) (born 1955), New Zealand representative rower

== Others ==
- David Simmons (ethnologist) (1930–2015), New Zealand ethnologist, historian and author

== See also ==
- David Simons (disambiguation)
