= Edward Simon =

Edward Simon may refer to:

- Edward Simon (musician) (born 1969), Venezuelan jazz pianist and composer
- Edward Simon (choreographer), American ballroom dance champion and choreographer
- Florent Edouard Simon (1799–1866), Louisiana Supreme Court justice
