= William Simon =

William Simon or Bill Simon may refer to:

- William E. Simon (1927–2000), United States Secretary of the Treasury (1974–1977)
- William H. Simon, Columbia Law School professor
- William S. Simon (born 1960), president and CEO of Walmart U.S. (2010–2014)
- William Simon (sociologist) (1920–2000), American educator
- Bill Simon (politician) (William Edward Simon, Jr.; born 1951), American businessman and politician
- Bill Simon (musician) (William L. Simon; 1920–2000), American jazz musician
- Glyn Simon (William Glyn Hughes Simon; 1903–1972), Archbishop of Wales
