= André Simon =

André Simon may refer to:

- André Simon (wine) (1877–1970), French London-based epicurean and wine writer
- André Simon (racing driver) (1920-2012), racecar driver of 12 Grands Prix 1951-57
- André Simon (cyclist) (1987–2023), Antiguan road cyclist
