= Carrie Obendorfer Simon =

Jewish-American communal leader

Carrie Simon née Obendorfer (March 5, 1872 – March 3, 1961) was a Jewish-American communal leader from Washington, D.C. She created a new role of leadership for Reform women in the United States through the various organizations she founded and was involved in.

== Life ==
Simon was born on March 5, 1872, in Uniontown, Alabama, the daughter of Leo William Obendorfer and Mary Wise. A few years after her birth, she moved with her family to Cincinnati, Ohio, where her father began a successful jewelry business and her mother founded a local chapter of the National Council of Jewish Women (NCJW) in 1895.

Simon graduated from the Cincinnati Conservatory of Music. She also served as section secretary of the NCJW chapter her mother founded, which made her aware of new possibilities that were opening for Jewish women in public life. Following her marriage to Rabbi Abram Simon, she went with her husband when he became a rabbi in Sacramento, California, in 1896, Omaha, Nebraska, in 1899, and Washington, D.C., in 1904. She continued to work with the NCJW while living in Sacramento, but as the NCJW struggled to reconcile its diverse members' different religious approaches, she turned her attention towards local congregational work. This led her, in 1905, to establish the Ladies Auxiliary Society of Washington Hebrew Congregation in 1905. It later renamed itself a sisterhood that went from holding the occasional synagogue fundraiser to turning the synagogue into a true social center.

Simon was a founder of the first of the national sisterhoods, the National Federation of Temple Sisterhoods in 1913 and served as its first president for the next six years. Under her, the Federation issued the Annual Jewish Art Calendar, established scholarship and education funds for Hebrew Union College in Cincinnati, and collected religious ceremonial objects for what would later be the College's Museum. She later became chairman of the Federation's committee on the Hebrew Union College dormitory, helping the campaign raise funds for a dormitory on the College's grounds that was dedicated in 1925. In 1943, she was named honorary president of the Federation. She was also chairman of the Conference Committee of National Jewish Women's Organizations and would appear in numerous pulpits all across the country to speak on behalf of Jewish women.

Simon used her position to encourage the Union of American Hebrew Congregations to include more women on synagogue boards and to welcome intermarried couples into synagogues and sisterhoods. In later years, she devoted herself to the Jewish Braille Institute of America, which was founded in 1931 and transcribed English, Yiddish, and Hebrew books into Braille with the help of sisterhood volunteers. In 1896, she married Abram Simon, who she met while he was a rabbinical student at Hebrew Union College. They had two children, Leo and David.

Simon died at the Washington Hospital Center on March 3, 1961, several weeks after she fractured her hip. Her funeral service took place in the Washington Hebrew Congregation, and she was buried in the Congregation's cemetery.
