= Alice Simon =

German holocaust victim (1887–1943)

- Born: August 30, 1887; Poznań, Poland
- Died: c. August 11–13, 1943
- Spouse: Herbert Simon (m. 1920)
- Children: Carl (son), Hedda (daughter)
- Parents: Arnold Remak (father); Hedwig Löwe (mother)

Alice Simon (née Remak; August 30, 1887 – c. August 11–13, 1943) was a German woman of Polish and Jewish ancestry, who was killed by the Nazis during The Holocaust. Her remains were later identified as part of the Jewish skull collection, and she is commemorated with a Stolperstein in front of her former home in Berlin.

== Biography ==
Alice Simon was born Alice Remak on August 30, 1887 in Poland. She was born in Posen into a Jewish family counting three generations of scientists Robert, Ernst and Robert Remak Jr., killed at Auschwitz in 1942.

She had two siblings, and her parents separated when she was ten after her mother decided to move with the children to Charlottenburg, Berlin due to anti-semitism in Poland. As an adult in Berlin, she worked as a secretary for Herbert Simon, a lawyer who was also an immigrant from Poland. They both converted to Protestantism and were baptized before getting married on August 2, 1920. They had twin children the next year. Her husband died at age 55 in 1936.

=== World War II ===
Simon sent her children to England but remained in Berlin to care for her mother-in-law. The last time she saw her children was during a visit to England in 1938. Her son emigrated to the United States in 1939, without knowing what happened to his mother.

Simon was sent to Auschwitz, and left that concentration camp alive but was killed days later in the gas chamber at the Natzweiler-Struthof concentration camp, in August 1943. The Nazis planned to create a museum display of Jewish skulls for Professor August Hirt of the Reichsuniversität Straßburg. Simon was one of the 86 victims.

=== After the war ===
For many years only a single victim—Menachem Taffel—had been positively identified through the efforts of Serge and Beate Klarsfeld. In 2003, Hans-Joachim Lang, a German professor at the University of Tübingen, succeeded in identifying all the victims by comparing a list of inmate numbers of the 86 corpses at the Reichs University in Strasbourg. These numbers had been surreptitiously recorded by Hirt's French assistant Henri Henrypierre, with a list of numbers of inmates vaccinated at Auschwitz. The names and biographical information of the victims were published in the 2014 book Die Namen der Nummern (The Names of the Numbers).

=== Homage ===
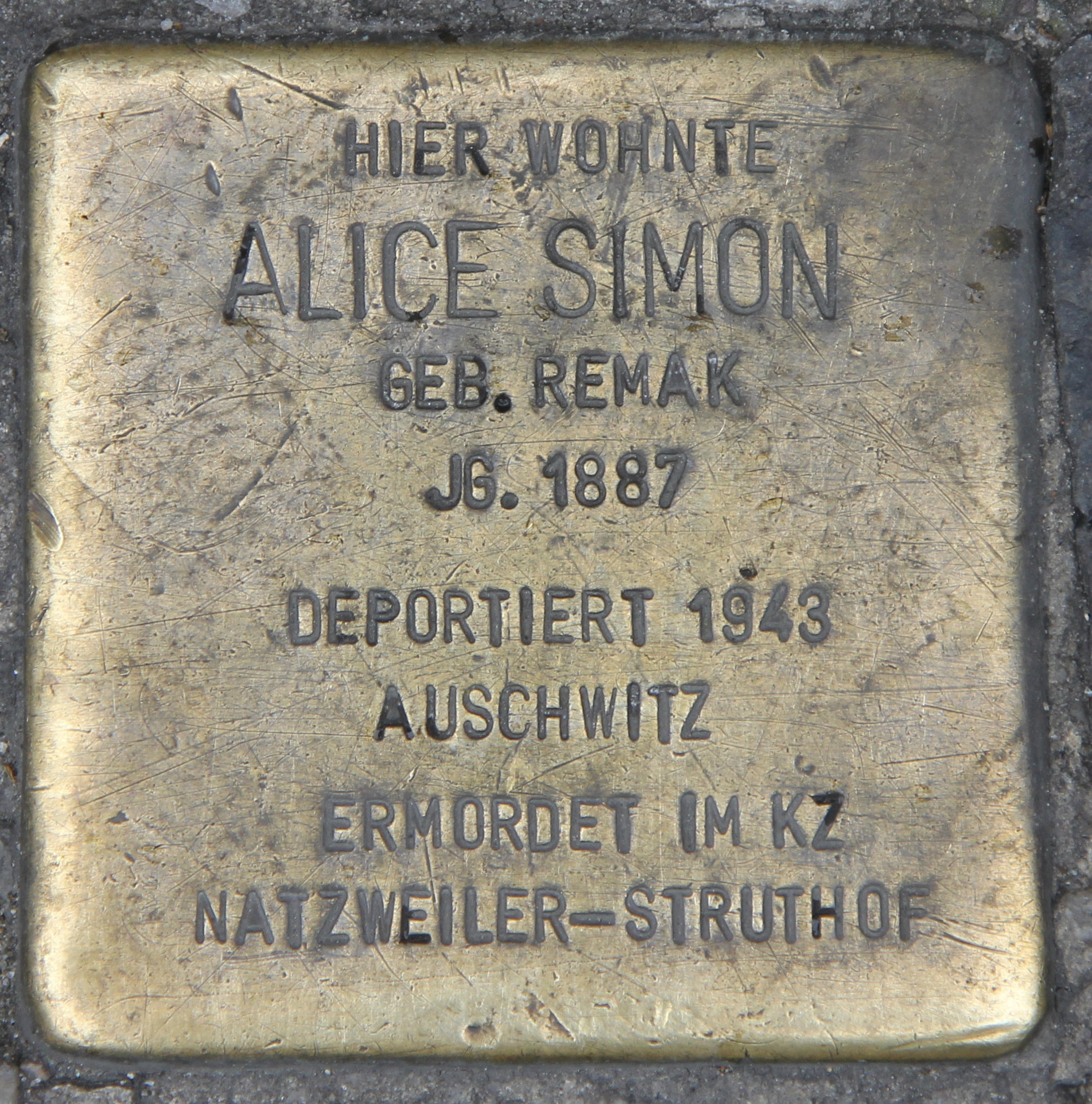
Stolperstein

In 1951, the remains of the 86 victims were reinterred in one location in the Cronenbourg-Strasbourg Jewish Cemetery. On December 11, 2005, memorial stones engraved with the names of the 86 victims were placed at the cemetery, thanks to European Jewish Congress and the vice-president of the World Jewish Congress Jean Kahn. One is at the site of the mass grave, the other along the wall of the cemetery. Another plaque honoring the victims was placed outside the Anatomy Institute at Strasbourg's University Hospital, where they are commemorated each year by the Cercle Menachem Taffel, founded by Georges Yoram Federmann. In 2006, a Stolperstein was placed in front of Joachimstaler Strasse 12 in Charlottenburg (Berlin) where she lived until her deportation. In April 2023, the Israeli President, Isaac Herzog, paid tribute to the “warriors of memory and human dignity, of the absolute saints, of Israel and of the nations of the world” that found the identity of the 86.

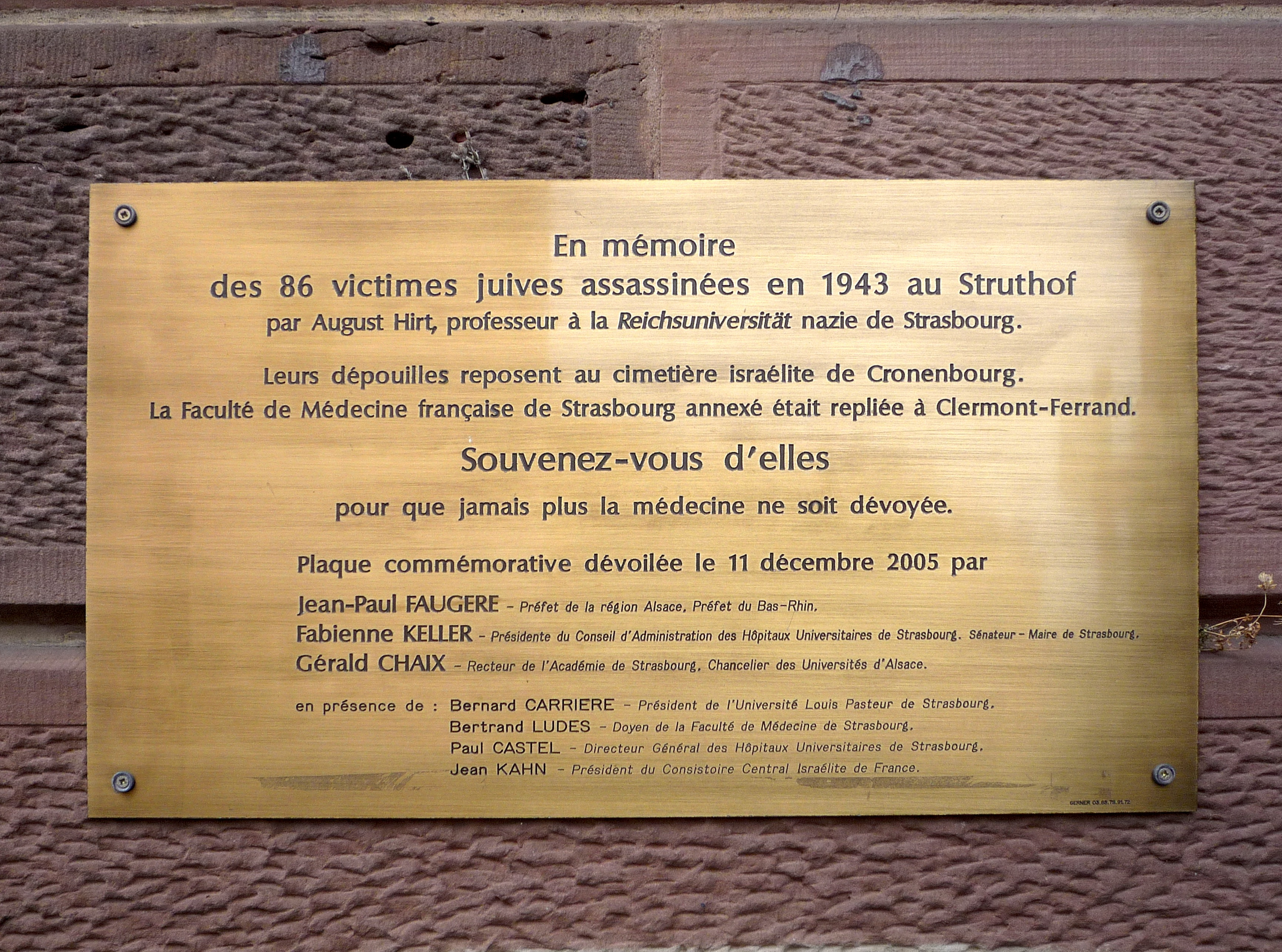
Memorial plaque at the Institute of Anatomy, University of Strasbourg

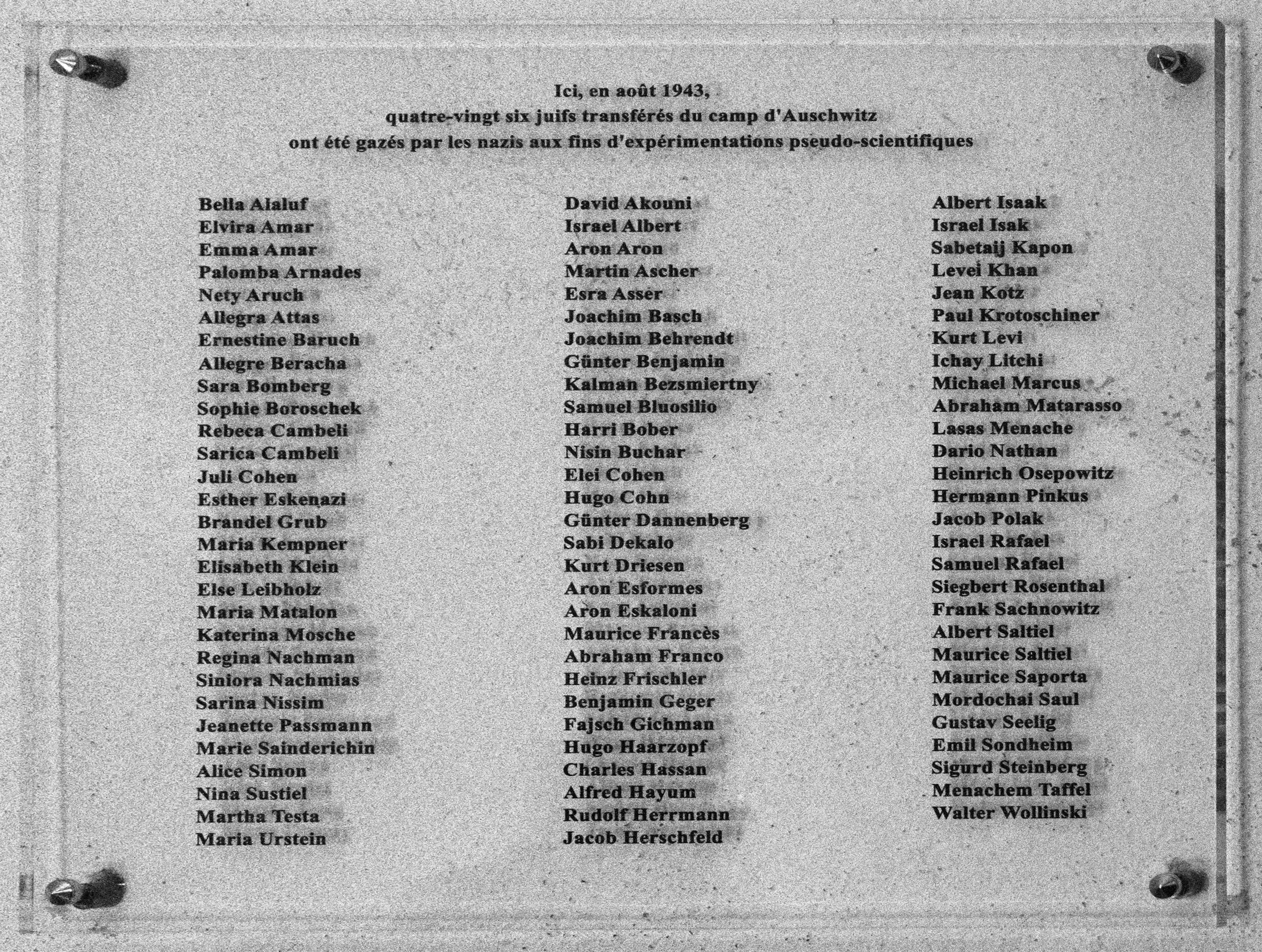
Memorial plaque with names of the victims outside of the gas chamber at Natzweiler-Struthof Concentration Camp

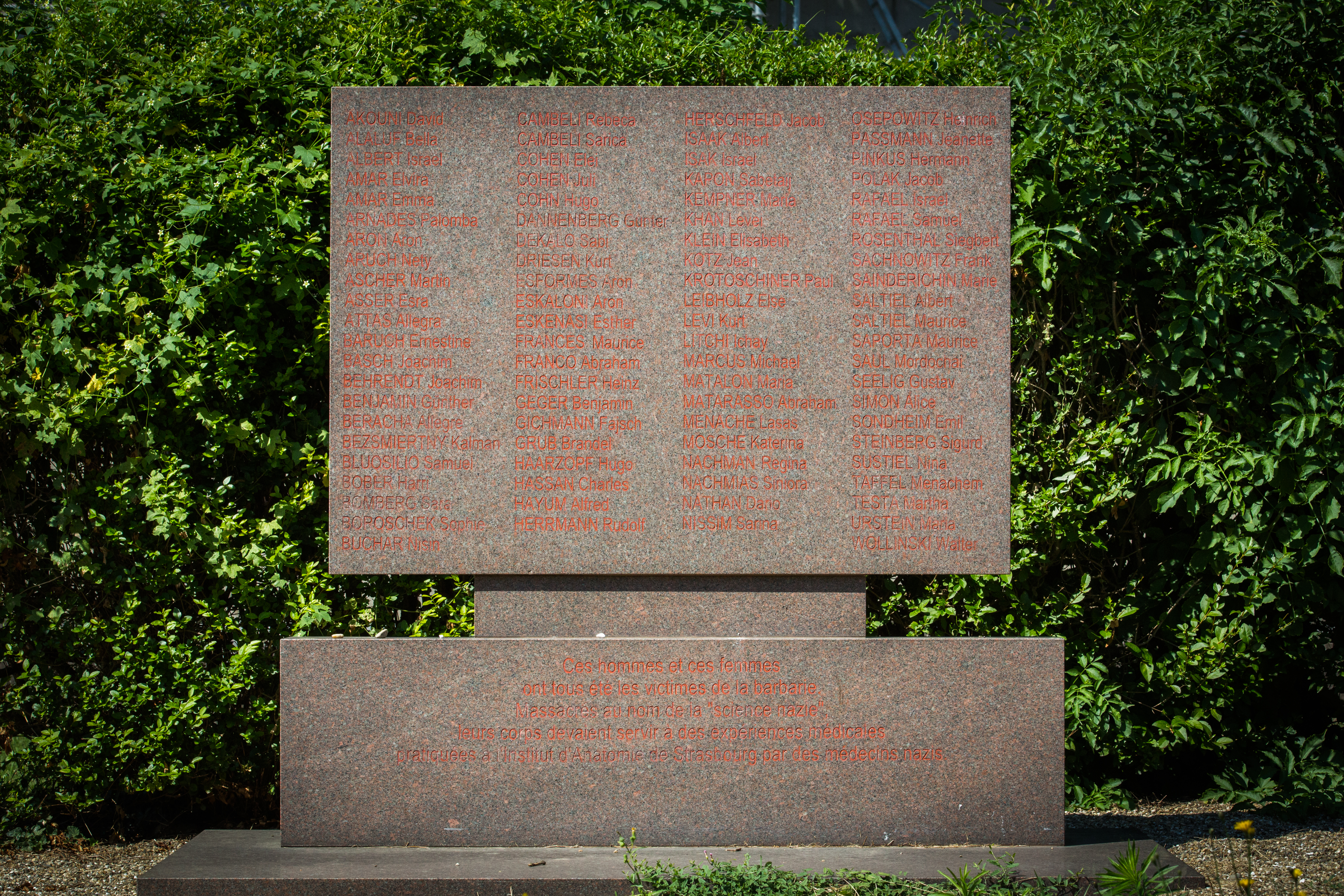
Memorial plaque with the names of the 86 victims at the Cronenbourg Jewish Cemetery

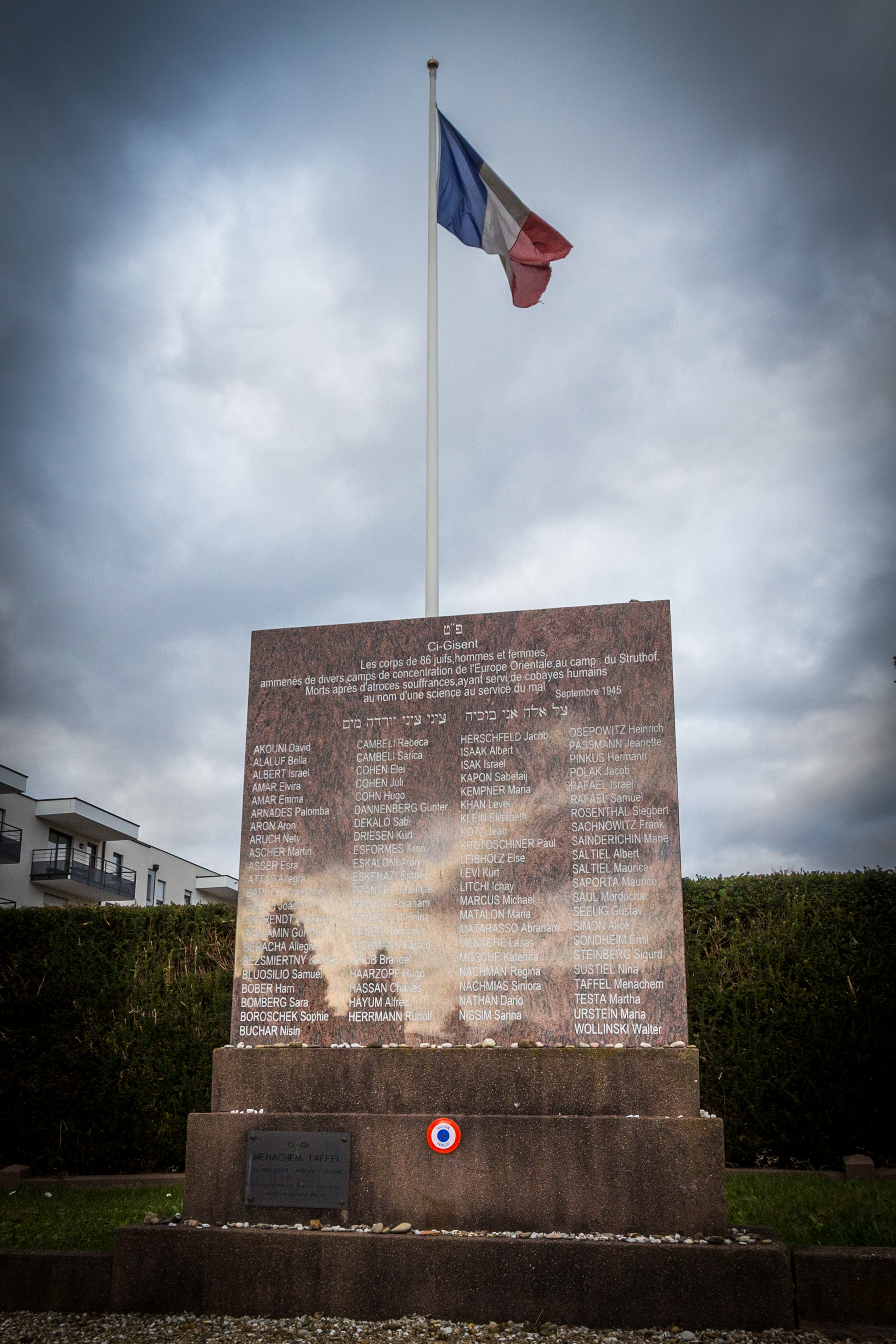
Monument to the 86 victims at the Cronenbourg Jewish Cemetery near Strasbourg

== Books ==
- Lang, Hans-Joachim (2004). Die Namen der Nummern: wie es gelang, die 86 Opfer eines NS-Verbrechens zu identifizieren [The names of the numbers: how it was possible to identify 86 victims of Nazi crimes] (first German ed.). Hamburg: Hoffmann und Campe. ISBN 978-3455094640.

== Selected articles ==
- Lang, Hans-Joachim (August 19, 2004). "Skelette für Straßburg Eines der grausigsten Wissenschaftsverbrechen des "Dritten Reiches" ist endlich aufgeklärt" [Skeletons for Strasbourg: One of the most gruesome crimes of science in the "Third Reich" is finally cleared]. Die Zeit (in German). No. 35.

== Documentaries ==
- Le nom des 86 (The name of the 86), documentary directed by Emmanuel Heyd and Raphael Toledano, duration 63 min. Production Dora Films sas – Alsace 20 – Télébocal – Cinaps TV, 2014.
- The Forgers of history (Les Faussaires de l'histoire), directed by Michael Prazan (in French) and Valérie Igounet, Talweg – France 5, 2014.
- The horrible story of the only concentration camp in France, by Mamytwink (in French), 2022

== See also ==
- Natzweiler-Struthof
- Liste der Stolpersteine in Berlin-Charlottenburg (in German)
