= Alan Simon =

Alan Simon may refer to:

- Alan Simon (EastEnders), fictional soap opera character
- Alan Simon (musician) (born 1964), French folk rock musician and composer
