= Maria Simon =

Maria Simon may refer to:

- Maria Simon (sociologist) (1918 – 2022), Austrian sociologist
- María Simón (1922 – 2009), Argentine sculptor
- Maria Simon (actress) (born 1976), German actress
- Marie Simon (1824–1877), German nurse
