= Murder of the Parker family =

1990 mass murder in Mississippi, U.S.

- Location: Walnut, Quitman County, Mississippi, U.S.
- Date: February 2, 1990
- Attack type: Mass murder, child murder, child rape
- Weapons: .32-caliber Winchester rifle.38-caliber revolver
- Victims: Carl Webster Parker, 58; Bobbie Jo Parker, 45; Gregory Wade Parker, 12; Charlotte Jo Parker, 9
- Perpetrators: Anthony Carr; Robert Simon Jr.
- Convictions: Capital murder (4 counts)
- Sentence: Death

On February 2, 1990, 58-year-old Carl Parker, his wife, 45-year-old Bobbie Jo Parker, and their two children, 12-year-old Gregory Parker and 9-year-old Charlotte Jo Parker, were tortured and murdered in their isolated rural home in Walnut, Quitman County, Mississippi, United States. After leaving a Church Bible study class that evening, the family returned home and stumbled upon an apparent burglary. Each family member was tied up, assaulted, and tortured. The burglars cut off Carl's finger to remove his wedding ring and also took turns raping Charlotte. All four family members were then shot multiple times. To conceal the crime, the perpetrators set the house on fire. Carl, Bobbie, and Gregory all died from gunshot wounds, while Charlotte was found to have died from smoke inhalation.

Police later identified Anthony Carr and Robert Simon Jr. as the men responsible for the massacre. Carr was found guilty of four counts of capital murder and sentenced to death for each count. Simon was also found guilty of four counts of capital murder; however, he was sentenced to death for only three counts, receiving a life sentence for the capital murder of Charlotte Parker. On May 24, 2011, Simon was nearly executed. Only four hours before he was due to die, however, a federal appeals court panel halted the execution to consider his claim that he was incompetent to be executed because he suffered a brain injury from a fall and had no memory. A federal judge later ruled that he had faked the entire ordeal and he remains on death row.

In 2023, the state filed a motion seeking Simon's execution once again. Simon's attorneys responded by saying he was intellectually disabled and not competent to be executed. The case is still pending. The Parker family murders have been described as one of the most gruesome and heinous murder cases in Mississippi state history.

== Background ==
Carl Webster "Bubba" Parker was born on November 29, 1931, in Lyon, Mississippi and grew up on a farm. He attended Walnut High School and then went on to study at Mississippi State University. He served in the Korean War and was a veteran of the United States Navy. In 1973, Carl Parker's first wife, Betty, was killed in a car crash when another vehicle hit their car. Carl and his two sons, Dean and Scott, survived.

Carl went on to marry his second wife, Bobbie Jo, on March 6, 1976. Bobbie Jo was a native of Huntsville, Alabama who was a piano teacher and secretary for Riverside Baptist Church. She attended Tennessee Temple University in Chattanooga, Tennessee. Together, the couple had two children, Gregory and Charlotte Jo. The family lived on an isolated farm and resided in the quiet community of Walnut, Quitman County, Mississippi.

== Murders ==
On the night of Friday, February 2, 1990, the Parker family attended a Bible study class at Riverside Baptist Church. They left around 9:00 p.m. and returned home. Upon arrival, they encountered two burglars who were in the process of ransacking their home. The burglars, 26-year-old Robert Simon Jr. and 24-year-old Anthony Carr, bound the family of four. The family was then assaulted and tortured. The burglars cut off Carl's finger to steal his wedding ring and raped Charlotte Jo. Investigators believe Carl was forced to watch the assault on his family and the rape of his 9-year-old daughter. Firefighters later reported that Carl had almost severed his own wrists struggling against the extension cord used to bind his hands and feet.

After the attack, Carr and Simon shot all four family members. Carl was shot twice in the side and between the shoulder blades, Bobbie Jo was shot once in the chest, Gregory was shot twice with one of the bullets hitting his heart, and Charlotte Jo was shot four times, three times in the back and once in the hip. Investigators believe Charlotte Jo broke free and attempted to flee. After shooting the family, Carr and Simon set the farm on fire with a petroleum product in an attempt to cover up the crime. It was later determined that Carl, Bobbie Jo, and Gregory died from gunshot wounds, while Charlotte Jo's cause of death was smoke inhalation.

== Aftermath ==
A passing motorist first spotted the fire about ten to fifteen minutes after it had been started and immediately called emergency services. Firefighters arrived at the Parker home around midnight and began extinguishing the flames. They found the bodies of Carl, Gregory, and Charlotte Jo in a rear room near the back door of the farm and removed them from the house before the fire could spread further. After the fire was extinguished, they found the body of Bobbie Jo in a back bedroom.

Carr and Simon fled the farm in Carl's pickup truck, which was found abandoned the following morning in Clarksdale. A witness described seeing two black males abandon the pickup truck and flee down a nearby alley. Investigators linked Carr and Simon to the crime and they were apprehended that afternoon. The men were taken into custody at a residence without incident.

== Trial and sentencing of Carr and Simon ==
Anthony Carr

Robert Simon

Due to pretrial publicity, Carr and Simon were not tried in Quitman County, and were instead tried in separate counties. Quitman County had to raise taxes and take out a loan to cover the cost of both Carr and Simon's trials, as well as the cost of their automatic appeals, which are granted to all death row inmates. In total, the costs were nearly $250,000.

On July 6, 1990, Simon was sentenced to life in prison for the capital murder of Charlotte Jo Parker. He was also sentenced to thirty years for kidnapping and another thirty years for sexual battery of a child. He faced another capital murder trial later in the year for the remaining murders of the Parker family. For Charlotte Jo's murder, Simon was tried in Jones County. The jury was unable to unanimously agree on a death sentence so he was sentenced to life in prison based on Mississippi law.

Carr was tried for all four murders in Alcorn County on a change of venue. On September 18, 1990, Carr was found guilty of murdering each family member. Another inmate testified at Carr's trial that Carr had bragged in jail about the crime and had supposedly said "he had a ball" murdering the family and raping Charlotte Jo. One of Carr's lawyers countered this claim by saying, "There is no kind of testimony less reliable than the testimony of a jailhouse snitch". On September 19, 1990, Carr was sentenced to death for the capital murders of Carl, Bobbie Jo, Gregory, and Charlotte Jo.

Simon was tried for the remaining three murders in DeSoto County. On October 13, 1990, Simon was sentenced to death for the capital murders of Carl, Bobbie Jo, and Gregory.

While in custody, Simon allegedly confessed to a total of 13 killings and 20 arson attacks against burglarized homes. One of his purported confessions included the fatal shooting of 40-year-old Leon Johnson, who was found dead near an abandoned house only four days before the Parker murders. Simon was additionally charged for Johnson's murder, and he received a life sentence for that killing in September 26, 1991 according to Mississippi Department of Corrections' records.

== Appeals and scheduled executions of Carr and Simon ==
Following the Atkins v. Virginia ruling in 2002, which prohibits states from executing mentally disabled people, Carr's attorneys tried to have his death sentence overturned, arguing that Carr was mentally disabled. During Carr's appeal in 2013, two psychologists evaluated him, however, they both disagreed as to whether Carr was mentally disabled or not. A Quitman County circuit judge determined that it was "too close to call" and chose to uphold Carr's death sentence. In 2016, the Mississippi Supreme Court overturned this ruling unanimously and sent the appeal back to the circuit court. Carl Parker's two sons from his first marriage, Dean and Scott, reacted to the decision with outrage. Scott Parker said, "It makes me sick to my stomach that one of these men could get off. I want to see justice done. I know it won't bring my family back, but it will ease the pain." As of 2024, Carr remains on death row.

In 2011, Simon was scheduled for execution, with the date set for May 24, 2011. On May 13, Simon filed a federal petition and motion to stay his execution on the grounds that he was too mentally incompetent to be executed. On May 24, he was only four hours away from execution when a federal appeals court panel stopped the execution from proceeding to consider Simon's claim that he was incompetent to be executed because he suffered a brain injury in a fall and had no memory. On March 1, 2012, the 5th Circuit reversed the denial of the petition and remanded the case for further proceedings. In 2015, a federal judge ruled that Simon had faked losing his memory and placed him back on death row and in line for execution. Simon appealed the ruling.

In November 2023, the state of Mississippi attempted to set an execution date for Simon once again. Simon's attorneys sought to delay the execution, stating that they were still seeking an evaluation of his mental competence. They further argued that Simon had not exhausted all of his legal options, citing multiple issues, including inadequate legal representation and a lack of funds for experts to evaluate his mental competence. The Mississippi Supreme Court ruled that an execution date would not be set for Simon until Fitch responded to Simon's claim, setting a deadline of December 20, 2023, for Fitch to respond and file a rebuttal. As of September 2025, the Mississippi Supreme Court has not ruled on Fitch's motion to set an execution date or on Simon's mental competence claim.

A November 2023 report revealed that both Anthony Carr and Robert Simon were among the 37 condemned inmates remaining on Mississippi's death row.

In June 2026, the Mississippi Supreme Court denied Anthony Carr's appeal against his death sentence.

== Further developments ==
Carl Parker's sons from his first marriage to Betty have since died. Dean Parker died of cancer on October 31, 2016, aged 54 and Scott Parker died from COVID-19 on September 8, 2021, aged 56.

== See also ==
- List of death row inmates in the United States
- List of people scheduled to be executed in the United States
