= Walter Simon =

Walter Simon may refer to:

- Walter Simon (sinologist) (1893–1981), sinologist and librarian
- Walter Carl Simon (1886–1971), American World War I flying ace
- Walter Simon (philanthropist) (1857–1920), German banker, councillor and philanthropist
- Walter Simon (spy) (c. 1882–?), German World War II spy
- Walter Simon (painter) (1916–1979), American painter
- Walt Simon (1939–1997), American basketball player

== See also ==
- Walter Simons (1861–1937), German lawyer and politician
