= Women of Reform Judaism =

Jewish social justice movement

Women of Reform Judaism (WRJ), formerly known as the National Federation of Temple Sisterhoods, is the women's affiliate of the Union for Reform Judaism. As the primary women's organization in the Reform Jewish Movement, WRJ represents tens of thousands of women in hundreds of Reform congregations all over North America and worldwide. WRJ cultivates sisterhood by empowering Reform Jewish women to find strength, joy, and connection in their communities. WRJ inspires spiritual growth by enriching contemporary life with Jewish rituals, traditions, culture, and opportunities for lifelong learning. Leading with the principle of Tikkun Olam ("healing the world") WRJ mobilizes collective action on a variety of social justice causes to create a more just and compassionate world for people of all backgrounds and identities. Through its YES Fund (Youth, Education, and Special Projects), WRJ raises funds to support its youth programs, educate congregational leaders, empowering women worldwide and uplifting diverse Jewish communities.

== Notable contributions ==
In 1972, the National Federation of Temple Sisterhoods was instrumental in the ordination of the first American female rabbi, Sally Priesand. In 1963 the National Federation of Temple Sisterhoods had approved a resolution at its biennial assembly calling on the Union of American Hebrew Congregations (now the Union for Reform Judaism), the Central Conference of American Rabbis, and the Hebrew Union College-Jewish Institute of Religion to move forward on the ordination of women.

The YES Fund (Youth, Education, and Special Projects), maintained by WRJ, provides support to North American Federation of Temple Youth, the Hebrew Union College, the Religious Action Center of Reform Judaism, and many other organizations and charities. WRJ also supports Abraham Geiger College, the first seminary to ordain a Rabbi in Germany since World War II.

The Torah: A Women's Commentary recently won the Everett Family Foundation Jewish Book of the Year award. This counterpart to The Torah: A Modern Commentary gives a new perspective on women in the Torah. A Women's Commentary is a scholarly work, written by Jewish women, that gives voices to the women in the Torah and gives a woman's perspective on these classical stories. The book began as a WRJ project in 1992 and was published in 2008 with URJ Press.

== Leadership and structure ==
For its first twenty years (1913–1933), Women of Reform Judaism was led by volunteer presidents, the first being Carrie Simon. Jane Evans became its first full-time Executive Director in 1933, a position she held until 1976. Another president was Stella Heinsheimer Freiberg.

In March 2020, Sara B. Charney of Holy Blossom Temple in Toronto became the first Canadian president of WRJ. Her First Vice President is Karen Sim (Isaac Mayer Wise Temple, Cincinnati, OH). She is also assisted by vice presidents Shoshana Dweck (Social Justice), Lillian Silver (Philanthropy), Jane Taves (Engagement), and Judy Wexler (Member Services). The Treasurer is Susan Singer. and the Secretary is Karen Goldberg.

The executive director is Rabbi Marla J. Feldman (Central Synagogue, New York, NY), and there is an executive committee to assist the Officers and Board of Directors. Rabbi Feldman will retire in June 2023, and the incoming executive director, Rabbi Liz P.G. Hirsch will lead WRJ starting in July 2023.

There are seven districts that span the United States and Canada, each of which has a district president.
