= Joseph Simon =

Joseph Simon may refer to:

- Joseph Simon (1712–1804), Jewish community leader in Pennsylvania, United States
- Joseph Simon (politician) (1851–1935), United States politician and attorney
- Joseph Simon (comics) (1913–2011), United States comic book writer, artist, editor, and publisher
- Joseph Simon (Monegasque politician) (1900–1968), three times president of the National Council (Monaco)
- Joseph T. Simon (1912–1976), Austrian jurist and resistance fighter, member of the Counterintelligence Corps
- Joseph Maria Anton Brassier de Saint-Simon-Vallade (1798–1872), Prussian diplomat; envoy to Italy of the North German Confederation

== See also ==
- Joe Simon (disambiguation)
- Joseph Simons
- Joseph Simonson
