= Harry Simon =

Harry Simon may refer to:

- Harry Simon (boxer) (born 1972), Namibian boxer
- Harry Simon (sport shooter) (1873–1932), American sport shooter
- Harry Simon (sinologist) (1923–2019), University of Melbourne academic
- Harry Simon (rugby union) (1911–1979), New Zealand rugby union player

== See also ==
- Henry Simon (disambiguation)
