= Roger Simon =

Roger Simon may refer to:

- Roger Simon, 2nd Baron Simon of Wythenshawe (1913–2002), British solicitor and left wing journalist and political activist
- Roger L. Simon (born 1943), screenwriter and novelist, and co-founder of PJ Media
- Roger Simon (journalist) (1948–2026), American columnist and political writer
- Roger Hendricks Simon (born 1942), American actor, producer, and director
