= Adam Simon (disambiguation) =

Adam Simon (born 1962) is a director and screenwriter.

Adam Simon may also refer to:

- Adam G. Simon (born 1977), actor and writer
- Ádám Simon (born 1990), Hungarian footballer
- Adam Simon (artist) (born 1952), American artist
