= Tamás Simon =

Hungarian poet

- Born: 1935
- Died: 1956 (aged 20–21)
- Writing career
- Language: Hungarian
- Notable work: A zsidó Don Juan

Tamás Simon (Hungarian: Simon Tamás; 1935–1956) was a Hungarian-Jewish poet and playwright. He is known for his verse drama A zsidó Don Juan, written in the mid-1950s. An adaptation of the story of Don Juan in a Jewish setting, the work was well received by writers such as Géza Képes and Géza Hegedüs. It was performed in November 1990 under the direction of László Salamon Suba.

Simon committed suicide by intentional drug overdose in 1956.

== Bibliography ==
- Simon, Tamás (2003). Farkas, Éva (ed.). A zsidó Don Juan: Drámai költemény. Budapest: Ex Libris. ISBN 978-963-85530-8-9.
