= Jacques Simon =

Jacques Simon may refer to:

- Jacques Simon (cyclist) (born 1938), French Olympic cyclist
- Jacques Simon (field hockey) (born 1903), French Olympic hockey player
- Jacques Simon (footballer) (1941–2017), French football player
