= Charles Simmons (author, born 1798) =

American clergyman and author

Charles Simmons (1798–1856) was an American clergyman and author.

His notable publications include Slavery of the United States to sinful and foolish custom, A Scripture manual, alphabetically and systematically arranged, designed to facilitate the finding of proof texts, and A laconic manual and brief remarker containing over a thousand subjects, alphabetically and systematically arranged.
