= Sindee Simon =

American polymer physicist

Sindee Lou Simon is an American chemical engineer and polymer physicist who studies the glass transition, thermosetting polymers, and nanoconfinement. Her research has included studies of ancient amber, showing that unlike liquids glass does not flow. She is the head of the Department of Chemical and Biomolecular Engineering at North Carolina State University.

== Education and career ==
Simon grew up in Wichita, Kansas, the daughter of a schoolteacher and a technical salesman for the aircraft industry; she was directed towards chemical engineering by a high school mathematics teacher. She became an undergraduate at Yale University, where she competed in the Yale swimming team, serving as captain of the team for two years, and was named an All-American for 1982 by the College Swimming Coaches Association of America for the backstroke in NCAA Division I.

After graduating, she worked for four years at the Beech Aircraft Corporation, on the materials science behind their first composite aircraft. She went to Princeton University for graduate study, completing her Ph.D. in 1992.

She joined the faculty at the University of Pittsburgh as an assistant professor of chemical and petroleum engineering in 1992, before moving to Texas Tech University in 1999. The move solved a two-body problem for her and her husband, chemical engineer Gregory B. McKenna, who moved from the National Institute of Standards and Technology to Texas Tech at the same time. At Texas Tech, she was department chair for chemical engineering from 2012 to 2019. She moved again, to North Carolina State University, in 2021.

== Recognition ==
Simon was named a Fellow of the American Physical Society (APS) in 2010, after a nomination from the APS Division of Polymer Physics, "for pioneering contributions to the understanding of the thermal and mechanical properties of bulk and nanostructured polymeric glasses". She also became a fellow of the North American Thermal Analysis Society in 2003, of the Society of Plastics Engineers in 2005, and of the American Institute of Chemical Engineers in 2015.

She was named P. W. Horn Distinguished Professor of Chemical Engineering at Texas Tech in 2010.

She was the 2014 winner of the Mettler Toledo Outstanding Achievement of the North American Thermal Analysis Society, and the 2019 winner of the International Award of the Society of Plastics Engineers, the first woman to win the society's highest award.
