= Charles Simon =

Charles Simon or Charles-Simon may refer to:

== Simon as surname ==
- Charles Simon (sports manager) (1882–1915), French lawyer and sports manager
- Charles Simon (anarchist) (1873–1894), French anarchist
- Charles Martin Simon (1941–2007), better known as Charlie Nothing, American musician, musical instrument maker and writer

== Simon as second name ==
- Charles-Simon Pradier (1786–1847), Swiss engraver
- Charles-Simon Catel (1773–1830), French composer and educator
- Charles Simon Clermont-Ganneau (1846–1923), French orientalist
- Charles Simon Favart (1710–1792), French playwright

== See also ==
- Charles Simons (disambiguation)
