= Vincent Simon =

Vincent Simon may refer to:

- Vincent Simon (footballer) (born 1983)
- Vincent Simon (fencer) (born 1990)
