= Georg Fayer =

Fayer's signature, Vienna

Fayer's signature

Georg Fayer (1892 – 5 November 1950) was an Austrian photographer of Hungarian origin. His daughter is artist and photographer Lillian Barylli-Fayer.

Fayer died in Cannes when he was about 58 years old.
