= Henry Simon =

Henry Simon may refer to:

- Hank Simon (1862–1925), Major League Baseball outfielder
- Henry Simon (politician) (1874–1926), French industrialist and politician
- Henry Gustav Simon (1835–1899), Manchester industrialist and founder of Simon Carves
- Henry Simon (general) (1921–2016), United States Air Force general

== See also ==
- Harry Simon (disambiguation)
