= Robert Simon =

Robert Simon may refer to:

- Robert Simón (born 1993), Spanish footballer
- Robert Simon (biker) (1951–1999), American criminal, Philly Warlocks MC founding member and multiple murderer
- Robert Simon (guitarist) (born 1956), British musician with Ultravox, Magazine, and Visage
- Robert A. Simon (1897–1981), American writer, translator, and music critic
- Robert B. Simon (born 1952), American art dealer who discovered Leonardo da Vinci's Salvator Mundi
- Robert E. Simon (1914–2015), American real estate and business developer who designed a planned community in Reston, Virginia
- Robert F. Simon (1908–1992), American actor
- Robert Simon Jr. (born 1963), American murderer convicted of the Parker family murders

== See also ==
- Bob Simon (1941–2015), American television journalist
- Robby Simon (born 1978), German slalom canoeist
