= Anne Simon (disambiguation) =

Anne Simon is an American biology professor and scientist.

Anne Simon may also refer to:

- Anne Simon (bowls), Guernsey international lawn bowler
- Anne Simon (comics), French comic book author and illustrator
- Anne W. Simon, American writer and environmentalist
- Jo Anne Simon, American attorney and politician
