= Richard Simon (painter) =

German painter

Richard Simon (1898–1993) was a German expressionist who used the pseudonym 'Simmerl'. His portrait appears on the official poster of the 1936 Summer Olympics in Berlin.

== Paintings ==
Expressionist motifs, his images possess a milky shine due to plenty of chalk mixed into oil paints. Nordic, Mediterranean, Austrian and German landscapes, portraits of his friends; in most cases using oil-based paint on painter cardboard or canvas; some sanguine and chalk drawings. The artist signed all his work as “SIM”. Simmerl lived and worked in a studio in Berlin, which he acquired from the German actress Adele Sandrock, close to the famous avenue Kurfürstendamm. At this location he painted until 1991 at the age of 93 years, almost every day. He completed his last painting in 1991, which then was sold in 1992 The chronological order of Simmerl's paintings clearly illustrates how his preference for the colors he used changed with age: from bright springish and summerly yellow-green impressions into darker, wintry blue or even blackish fall and winter subjects.

== Simmerl Posing for the Poster of the 1936 Summer Olympics in Berlin ==
The 'Propaganda Committee for the Olympic Games Berlin 1936' ordered the Hungarian graphic designer Theo Matejko to submit a draft for the official 1936 Olympics poster. This portrayed his then best friend, Simmerl, whole-body nude, holding a laurel wreath, backgrounded by the Brandenburg Gate and a rising sun. The national-socialist leaders insisted that the model's private zone had to be covered with a sash including a cockade. Furthermore, a silver swastika should adorn the cockade, which Simmerl categorically rejected, using the - socially not acceptable, but historically verified - phrase “there will be no swastika on my balls”. Hence Matjeko was rejected his draft, but he was allowed to keep his 5,000 Mark upfront payment.

A graphic artists team integrated the basic idea and a substantial part of this draft in the poster’s final version, which is now officially attributed to the 1936 as well as today widely unknown German graphic designer Franz Würbel; thus “immortalizing” Simmerl’s face and a part of his torso. See official poster Olympic Games 1936

== Circle of Friends ==
Simon was born in Munich and died in Berlin. During the "Roaring Twenties" the German capital was one of the centers of cultural life in Europe. Artists performing in every cultural area imaginable, gathered in Berlin; actors, singers, writers, poets, musicians, sculptors, and, of course, painters. There were theaters with performances, concerts and first nights, within the upcoming film industry a rapidly increasing number of movies, new and traditional publishing houses with first editions of an entire generation of poets and writers, freedom of arts breeding expressionism and other new and experimental fine arts. Simmerl was a part of this culture.

Besides Theo Matjeko, he may name as his friends the German poets and writers Joachim Ringelnatz and Erich Kästner, the Austrian and German actresses Tilla Durieux (he portrayed her) and Adele Sandrock; later, during and after World War II operetta singer Käthe Dorsch as well as the actors Käthe Haak and Hans Söhnker. The last 15–20 years Simmerl was closest associated with the opera singer (bass-baritone) and college professor Josef Greindl, who died the same year 1993 as did his friend.

Simmerl’s paintings, which he commonly referred to as his “kids” hung in the homes of Josef Greindl, Hans Söhnker and Käthe Haak. Simmerl only sold as many paintings as he needed to make a basic living, which, however, during his long life accumulated to a significant number. But, after all, only his friends were ever designated to own his "finest" paintings.
