= George K. Simon =

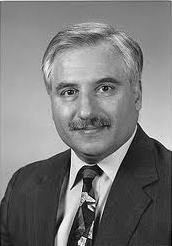
- Born: February 1, 1948 (age 78); Laie, Hawaii, United states
- Education: PhD Psychology
- Occupation: Author
- Writing career
- Genre: Self help
- Website: www.drgeorgesimon.com

George K. Simon (born February 1, 1948) is the American self-help author of In Sheep's Clothing: Understanding and Dealing with Manipulative People, a 1996 book about psychological manipulation.

Simon has written about character impairment in two additional books and was an active blogger.

- Simon, George K. (2011). Character Disturbance. Parkhurst Brothers ISBN 9781935166337
- Simon, George K. (2013). The Judas Syndrome. Abingdon Press ISBN 978-1426751097

Simon received his Ph.D. in clinical psychology from Texas Tech University and is a Board Certified Diplomate in Forensic and Clinical Psychology (ACFEI). Simon served for several years on the Arkansas Governor’s Commission on Domestic Abuse, Rape and Violence, is a past President of the Arkansas Psychological Association.

In 1996-1997 Simon appeared on national television in the US (The O'Reilly Report) and on CBS' 48 Hours, The Dog Trainer, the Heiress and the Bodyguard and on local news features in Birmingham (Metro Monitor), Dallas (Good Morning Texas), Little Rock (Morning Show, Evening News) and Memphis (AM Focus).

In 2020, Simon was interviewed by Dennis Relojo-Howell on the topic of psychological manipulation.
