= Joanna Simon =

Joanna Simon may refer to:

- Joanna Simon (mezzo-soprano) (1936–2022), American mezzo-soprano opera singer
- Joanna Simon (wine writer), British author and wine columnist

== See also ==
- Jo Anne Simon (born 1970), American attorney and politician
