= David Simon (disambiguation) =

David Simon (born 1960) is an American journalist, novelist and television writer.

David Simon may also refer to:

- David Simón (born 1988), Spanish footballer
- David Simon (basketball) (born 1982), American basketball player
- David Simon (CEO) (1962–2026), CEO of Simon Property Group
- David Simon (rower) (born 1979), American Olympic rower
- David Simon, 3rd Viscount Simon (1940–2021), British peer
- David Simon, Baron Simon of Highbury (born 1939), British businessman

== See also ==
- David Simons (disambiguation)
