= John Simon =

John Simon may refer to:

== Arts and entertainment ==
- John Simon (critic) (1925–2019), American author and critic
- John Simon (music producer) (born 1941), record producer for Columbia Records
- John F. Simon Jr. (born 1963), American artist and creator of Unfolding Object

== Politicians and peers ==
- John Simon (died 1524), MP for Exeter
- John Simon (MP for Dewsbury) (1818–1897), British politician
- John Simon, 1st Viscount Simon (1873–1954), Lord Chancellor of Great Britain, 1940–1945
  - Two of his descendants who have held the title of Viscount Simon

== Sports ==
- John Simon (rugby league) (born 1972), Australian former professional rugby league footballer
- John Simon (running back) (born 1978), American football running back
- John Simon (linebacker) (born 1990), American football linebacker
- John L. Simon, U.S. national swimming coach

== Others ==
- John Simon (engraver) (1675–1751), Anglo-French engraver
- Sir John Simon (pathologist) (1816–1904), Chief Medical Officer (United Kingdom), 1855–1876
- John Y. Simon (1933–2008), American Civil War scholar
- John Douglas Simon (born 1957), president of Lehigh University
- Jonathan Simon, UC Berkeley Law professor

== See also ==
- John Simons (born 1956), British radio executive
- John Simons (chemist) (born 1934), British physical chemist
- Jack Simons (1882–1948), Australian businessman, sports administrator and politician
- Jonathan Simons, American oncologist
