= Steven Honigberg =

American cellist

Steven Honigberg (born 17 May 1962) is an American cellist. He is a member of the National Symphony Orchestra and the Potomac String Quartet. From 1994 to 2002, Honigberg served as chamber music series director at the United States Holocaust Memorial Museum, during which time the museum produced forty concerts and issued four CDs. From 1990 to 2009, he was principal cellist and chamber music director of the Edgar M. Bronfman series in Sun Valley, Idaho, where he was featured as soloist with the summer symphony in a variety of concerti. Hongiberg solos frequently; he is also known as a well-reviewed performer from David Ott's premier of Concerto for Two Cellos.

A native of Chicago, Honigberg presented eight performances of Tchaikovsky's "Variations on a Rococo Theme" with the Chicago Symphony Orchestra as a 16-year-old winner of Chicago's Youth Competition. The summer before, Honigberg, as a result of winning the 1978 Concerto Competition, performed with the World Youth Symphony as soloist in Bloch's "Schelomo", a performance that was recorded and released by the National Music Camp.

Honigberg graduated from the Juilliard School with a master's degree in 1984. That same year, he soloed with the Juilliard Orchestra at Alice Tully Hall in Strauss' Don Quixote, presented his New York Debut recital as a competition winner in Carnegie Recital Hall and was chosen by Mstislav Rostropovich to become a member of the National Symphony Orchestra in Washington, D.C.

In February, 1988, Rostropovich led the National Symphony Orchestra in the world premiere of the Concerto for Two Cellos, by David Ott; with David Teie and Honigberg, to whom the score is dedicated, as soloists. The Washington Post wrote "...the audience gave it a five-minute standing ovation." The Washington Times reported, "It was a case of love at first hearing. Mr. Rostropovich hugged and kissed the composer and his cellists as the packed house roared its approval." A champion of the work, Rostropovich subsequently programmed the "Concerto for Two Cellos" on the NSO's 1989 and 1994 U.S. tours. The cellists have played the work 30 times with numerous orchestras.

Honigberg is a member of the Washington, D.C.–based Potomac String Quartet, which released landmark projects - the complete string quartets of David Diamond (1915–2005; eleven quartets on four CDs) and Quincy Porter (1897–1966; nine quartets on two CD's). Honigberg also recorded Homage to Rostropovich (1927–2007), a CD of solo cello works written for the cellist; Frédéric Chopin's complete works for cello and piano; Ludwig van Beethoven's complete works for cello and piano; and his debut American works CD (Barber, Bernstein, Schuller, Foss, Diamond) rounds out his current discography.

Honigberg is noted for explorations of new works, such as Lukas Foss' Anne Frank (1999), Benjamin Lees' Night Spectres (1999), Robert Stern's Hazkarah (1998), Robert Starer's Song of Solitude (1995), and David Diamond's Concert Piece (1993), all written for, premiered and recorded by the cellist.

Honigberg is author of Leonard Rose: America's Golden Age and Its First Cellist, published in 2010 and revised in 2013.
