= Robert Simons (economist) =

American economist

Robert Simons is an American economist currently the Charles R. Williams professor at Harvard Business School. He did his Ph.D. at McGill University

Simons is also an author of cases used in management education. He has featured among the top 40 case authors consistently, since the list was first published in 2016 by The Case Centre. Simons ranked 2nd in 2019/20, 4th in 2018/19 and 2017/18, 11th in 2016/17 and 14th in 2015/16.

== Books and research papers ==
Simons' books and research papers have been cited thousands of times according to Google Scholar.

His top cited books and research papers include:

- 1987: Accounting control systems and business strategy: an empirical analysis, Accounting, organizations and society 12 (4), Pages 357–374.
- 1990: The role of management control systems in creating competitive advantage: new perspectives, Readings in accounting for management control, Pages 622–645.
- 1994: Levers of control: How managers use innovative control systems to drive strategic renewal, Harvard Business Press
- 1994: How new top managers use control systems as levers of strategic renewal, Strategic management journal 15 (3), Pages 169–189.
- 1995: Control in an Age of Empowerment. Harvard business review 73 (2), Pages 80–88.
- 2000: Performance measurement and control systems for implementing strategy.
