= Herbert Simon =

Herbert Simon may refer to:

- Herbert A. Simon (1916–2001), American political scientist and economist
- Herbert Simon (real estate) (born 1934), American real estate developer
