= Norman Gerstenfeld =

British-American rabbi (1904–1968)

Rabbi Norman Gerstenfeld

Personal life
- Born: September 1, 1904 London, England
- Died: January 27, 1968 (aged 63) Washington, D.C., United States
- Spouse: Louise Mundheim Gerstenfeld

Religious life
- Religion: Judaism
- Denomination: Reform Judaism

Jewish leader
- Semikhah: Hebrew Union College

Norman Gerstenfeld was an American Reform rabbi who served as the senior rabbi of Washington Hebrew Congregation in Washington, D.C. He played a prominent role in the Jewish community of DC and the national Reform movement.

== Early life ==
Gerstenfeld was born in London, England, on September 1, 1904, the son of Rabbi Shmuel Gerstenfeld and Braina Pechman. Gerstenfeld's father was born in Rava-Russkaya, Galicia, in what is now Ukraine. He was married to Louise Mundheim Gerstenfeld, who died in 1970 at age 64, two years after his death.

== Career ==
Gerstenfeld was ordained by the Hebrew Union College (HUC) in Cincinnati and also held a degree from American University in Washington, D.C. From 1935, he was a Fellow in Jewish Philosophy at the HUC. He became an assistant rabbi at Washington Hebrew Congregation in 1935, a synagogue that had been in disarray and decline for several decades. Three years later he became senior rabbi of the congregation.

On November 16, 1952, President Harry S. Truman attended the cornerstone laying at the Washington Hebrew Congregation's new synagogue building. President Truman addressed Rabbi Gerstenfeld in his opening statement, who was in attendance.

Rabbi Gerstenfeld was initially a vocal anti-Zionist, however, by 1948 he had come to support the State of Israel.

== Death ==
Gerstenfeld died of a heart attack on January 27, 1968, at the age of 63.
