= List of Australia's national representative rowers =

List of Australia's national representative rowers is a list of rowers who have represented Australia at the senior level at either World Rowing Championships, Olympic or Paralympic Games or a Commonwealth Games. The list does not include rowers who have only represented at the junior or U23 level or only at a Trans-Tasman series or World Rowing Cups.

In October 2015 Rowing Australia launched the McVilly-Pearce pin, named after Cecil McVilly, Australia's first Olympic rowing representative and Bobby Pearce, the first Australian rower to win an Olympic gold. Every Australian senior level representative rower is to receive a specially numbered pin to commemorate the first time they were honoured with Australian selection for an international championship regatta. Accordingly, the McVilly-Pearce pin number series is a chronological sequence of the rowers who have represented Australia at the senior level.

Australia's representative rowers at the senior level
M-V pin#	Name	State	Year	Boat	Event
1	Cecil McVilly	TAS	1912	M1x	1912 Stockholm Olympics
2	John Ryrie	NSW	1912	M8+	1912 Stockholm Olympics
3	Simon Fraser	VIC	1912	M8+	1912 Stockholm Olympics
4	Hugh Ward	NSW	1912	M8+	1912 Stockholm Olympics
5	Thomas Parker	NSW	1912	M8+	1912 Stockholm Olympics
6	Henry Hauenstein	NSW	1912	M8+	1912 Stockholm Olympics
7	Sydney Middleton	NSW	1912	M8+	1912 Stockholm Olympics
8	Harry Ross-Soden	VIC	1912	M8+	1912 Stockholm Olympics
9	Roger Fitzhardinge	NSW	1912	M8+	1912 Stockholm Olympics
10	Robert Waley	NSW	1912	M8+	1912 Stockholm Olympics
11	Arthur Bull	NSW	1924	M1x	1924 Paris Olympics
12	Harry Graetz	SA	1924	M8+	1924 Paris Olympics
13	Edward Thomas	SA	1924	M8+	1924 Paris Olympics
14	Walter Jarvis	SA	1924	M8+	1924 Paris Olympics
15	Arthur Scott	SA	1924	M8+	1924 Paris Olympics
16	Alf Taeuber	SA	1924	M8+	1924 Paris Olympics
17	Walter Pfeiffer	SA	1924	M8+	1924 Paris Olympics
18	Frank Cummings	SA	1924	M8+	1924 Paris Olympics
19	William Sladden	SA	1924	M8+	1924 Paris Olympics
20	Robert Cummings	SA	1924	M8+	1924 Paris Olympics
21	Henry "Bobby" Pearce	NSW	1928	M1x	1928 Amsterdam Olympics
22	Cecil Pearce	NSW	1936	M1x	1936 Berlin Olympics
23	William Cross	NSW	1936	M8+	1936 Berlin Olympics
24	Don Ferguson	NSW	1936	M8+	1936 Berlin Olympics
25	Len Einsaar	NSW	1936	M8+	1936 Berlin Olympics
26	George Elias	NSW	1936	M8+	1936 Berlin Olympics
27	Mervyn Wood	NSW	1936	M8+	1936 Berlin Olympics
28	Walter Jordan	NSW	1936	M8+	1936 Berlin Olympics
29	Joe Gould	NSW	1936	M8+	1936 Berlin Olympics
30	Wal Mackney	NSW	1936	M8+	1936 Berlin Olympics
31	Norman Ella	NSW	1936	M8+	1936 Berlin Olympics
32	Bill Dixon	NSW	1936	M2x	1936 Berlin Olympics
33	Herb Turner	NSW	1936	M2x	1936 Berlin Olympics
34	Gordon Freeth	WA	1938	M4+	1938 Commonwealth Games
35	Don Fraser	WA	1938	M4+	1938 Commonwealth Games
36	Stewart Elder	VIC	1938	M4+	1938 Commonwealth Games
37	Jack Fisher	NSW	1938	M4+	1938 Commonwealth Games
38	Harry Kerr	NSW	1938	M4+	1938 Commonwealth Games
39	William Thomas	NSW	1938	M8+	1938 Commonwealth Games
40	Frank le Soeuf	VIC	1938	M8+	1938 Commonwealth Games
41	Gordon Yewers	WA	1938	M8+	1938 Commonwealth Games
42	Richard Paramor	WA	1938	M8+	1938 Commonwealth Games
43	Ted Bromley	NSW	1938	M8+	1938 Commonwealth Games
44	Alfred Gregory	SA	1938	M8+	1938 Commonwealth Games
45	Doug Bowden	NSW	1938	M8+	1938 Commonwealth Games
46	Spencer Grace	NSW	1948	M2-	1948 London Olympics
47	Jack Webster	VIC	1948	M4+	1948 London Olympics
48	Colin Douglas-Smith	VIC	1948	M4+	1948 London Olympics
49	Hugh Lambie	VIC	1948	M4+	1948 London Olympics
50	Walter Lambert	VIC	1948	M4+	1948 London Olympics
51	Tom Darcy	TAS	1948	M4+	1948 London Olympics
52	Murray Riley	NSW	1950	M2x	1950 Commonwealth Games
53	Ken Gee	NSW	1950	M4+	1950 Commonwealth Games
54	Cecil Winkworth	NSW	1950	M4+	1950 Commonwealth Games
55	Erwin Elder	NSW	1950	M4+	1950 Commonwealth Games
56	Leslie Montgomery	NSW	1950	M4+	1950 Commonwealth Games
57	Kevin Fox	NSW	1950	M4+	1950 Commonwealth Games
58	Bob Tinning	NSW	1950	M8+	1950 Commonwealth Games
59	Phil Cayzer	NSW	1950	M8+	1950 Commonwealth Games
60	Peter Holmes a Court	NSW	1950	M8+	1950 Commonwealth Games
61	Bruce Goswell	NSW	1950	M8+	1950 Commonwealth Games
62	Ross Selman	NSW	1950	M8+	1950 Commonwealth Games
63	Eric Longley	NSW	1950	M8+	1950 Commonwealth Games
64	Edward Pain	NSW	1950	M8+	1950 Commonwealth Games
65	Alan Brown	NSW	1950	M8+	1950 Commonwealth Games
66	James Barnes	NSW	1950	M8+	1950 Commonwealth Games
67	John Rodgers	NSW	1952	M2x	1952 Helsinki Olympics
68	Don Palmer	NSW	1952	M2-	1952 Helsinki Olympics
69	Vic Middleton	NSW	1952	M2-	1952 Helsinki Olympics
70	Ernest Chapman	NSW	1952	M8+	1952 Helsinki Olympics
71	Nimrod Greenwood	NSW	1952	M8+	1952 Helsinki Olympics
72	David Anderson	NSW	1952	M8+	1952 Helsinki Olympics
73	Geoff Williamson	NSW	1952	M8+	1952 Helsinki Olympics
74	Mervyn Finlay	NSW	1952	M8+	1952 Helsinki Olympics
75	Tom Chessell	NSW	1952	M8	1952 Helsinki Olympics
76	Peter Evatt	NSW	1954	M1x	1954 Commonwealth Games
77	Lionel Robberds	NSW	1954	M4+	1954 Commonwealth Games
78	Stuart Mackenzie	NSW	1956	M1x	1956 Melbourne Olympics
79	Peter Raper	NSW	1956	M2-	1956 Melbourne Olympics
80	Maurice Grace	NSW	1956	M2-	1956 Melbourne Olympics
81	Robert Duncan	VIC	1956	M2+	1956 Melbourne Olympics
82	Bruce Dickson	VIC	1956	M2+	1956 Melbourne Olympics
83	John Cockbill	VIC	1956	M2+	1956 Melbourne Olympics
84	John Harrison	NSW	1956	M4-	1956 Melbourne Olympics
85	Gordon Cowey	VIC	1956	M4+	1956 Melbourne Olympics
86	Kevin McMahon	VIC	1956	M4+	1956 Melbourne Olympics
87	Reg Libbis	VIC	1956	M4+	1956 Melbourne Olympics
88	Ian Allen	VIC	1956	M4+	1956 Melbourne Olympics
89	John Jenkinson	VIC	1956	M4+	1956 Melbourne Olympics
90	Michael Aikman	VIC	1956	M8+	1956 Melbourne Olympics
91	David Boykett	VIC	1956	M8+	1956 Melbourne Olympics
92	Fred Benfield	NSW	1956	M8+	1956 Melbourne Olympics
93	Jim Howden	VIC	1956	M8+	1956 Melbourne Olympics
94	Garth Manton	VIC	1956	M8+	1956 Melbourne Olympics
95	Neville Howell	VIC	1956	M8+	1956 Melbourne Olympics
96	Adrian Monger	VIC	1956	M8+	1956 Melbourne Olympics
97	Brian Doyle	VIC	1956	M8+	1956 Melbourne Olympics
98	Neil Hewitt	VIC	1956	M8+	1956 Melbourne Olympics
99	Steve Roll	NSW	1958	M2-	1958 Commonwealth Games
100	Kevyn Webb	NSW	1958	M2-	1958 Commonwealth Games
101	Bruce Evans	NSW	1958	M4-	1958 Commonwealth Games
102	Neville Clinton	NSW	1958	M4-	1958 Commonwealth Games
103	Kenneth Railton	NSW	1958	M4-	1958 Commonwealth Games
104	Victor Schweikert	NSW	1958	M4-	1958 Commonwealth Games
105	Ralfe Currall	NSW	1958	M4+	1958 Commonwealth Games
106	Roland Waddington	NSW	1958	M4+	1958 Commonwealth Games
107	Mick Allen	NSW	1958	M4+	1958 Commonwealth Games
108	Kevin Evans	NSW	1958	M4+	1958 Commonwealth Games
109	Ian Tutty	NSW	1960	M2x	1960 Rome Olympics
110	John Hunt	VIC	1960	M2-	1960 Rome Olympics
111	Terry Davies	VIC	1960	M2-	1960 Rome Olympics
112	Paul Guest	VIC	1960	M2+	1960 Rome Olympics
113	Ian Johnston	VIC	1960	M2+	1960 Rome Olympics
114	Brian Vear	VIC	1960	M4-	1960 Rome Olympics
115	Peter Guest	VIC	1960	M4-	1960 Rome Olympics
116	Peter Gillon	VIC	1960	M4-	1960 Rome Olympics
117	Kim Jelbart	VIC	1960	M4-	1960 Rome Olympics
118	Max Annett	NSW	1960	M4+	1960 Rome Olympics
119	John Hudson	NSW	1960	M4+	1960 Rome Olympics
120	Milton Francis	WA	1960	M8+	1960 Rome Olympics
121	Geoffrey Hale	WA	1960	M8+	1960 Rome Olympics
122	John Ledder	WA	1960	M8+	1960 Rome Olympics
123	Alex Cunningham	WA	1960	M8+	1960 Rome Olympics
124	Maxwell Gamble	WA	1960	M8+	1960 Rome Olympics
125	Berry Durston	WA	1960	M8+	1960 Rome Olympics
126	Roger Ninham	WA	1960	M8+	1960 Rome Olympics
127	John Rosser	WA	1960	M8+	1960 Rome Olympics
128	Terrence Scook	WA	1960	M8+	1960 Rome Olympics
129	John Castle	VIC	1962	M4+	1962 World Rowing Championships
130	Robin Jones	VIC	1962	M4+	1962 World Rowing Championships
131	Peter Edwards	VIC	1962	M4+	1962 World Rowing Championships
132	Kevin Wickham	VIC	1962	M4+	1962 World Rowing Championships
133	Ian Douglas	VIC	1962	M8+	1962 World Rowing Championships
134	Charles Lehman	VIC	1962	M8+	1962 World Rowing Championships
135	Graeme McCall	VIC	1962	M8+	1962 World Rowing Championships
136	Martin Tomanovits	VIC	1962	M8+	1962 World Rowing Championships
137	David Palfreyman	VIC	1962	M8+	1962 World Rowing Championships
138	Barclay Wade	NSW	1962	M2x	1962 Commonwealth Games
139	Graeme Squires	TAS	1962	M2x	1962 Commonwealth Games
140	Bill Hatfield	NSW	1962	M2-	1962 Commonwealth Games
141	Simon Newcomb	VIC	1962	M4-	1962 Commonwealth Games
142	David John	VIC	1962	M4+	1962 Commonwealth Games
143	David Caithness	VIC	1962	M4+	1962 Commonwealth Games
144	Derek Norwood	VIC	1962	M4+	1962 Commonwealth Games
145	David Ramage	VIC	1962	M4+	1962 Commonwealth Games
146	Phillip Sarah	VIC	1962	M4+	1962 Commonwealth Games
147	Duchan Stankovich	VIC	1962	M8+	1962 Commonwealth Games
148	Gary Pearce	NSW	1964	M2x	1964 Tokyo Olympics
149	Robert Shirlaw	NSW	1964	M2-	1964 Tokyo Olympics
150	Neil Lodding	VIC	1964	M2+	1964 Tokyo Olympics
151	Bruce Richardson	VIC	1964	M2+	1964 Tokyo Olympics
152	Wayne Gammon	VIC	1964	M2+	1964 Tokyo Olympics
153	Anthony Walker	VIC	1964	M4-	1964 Tokyo Olympics
154	Richard Garrard	VIC	1964	M4-	1964 Tokyo Olympics
155	Alf Duval	NSW	1964	M4+	1964 Tokyo Olympics
156	John Campbell	NSW	1964	M4+	1964 Tokyo Olympics
157	Gary Herford	NSW	1964	M4+	1964 Tokyo Olympics
158	Alan Grover	NSW	1964	M4+	1964 Tokyo Olympics
159	Robert Lachal	VIC	1964	M8+	1964 tokyo Olympics
160	George Xouris	VIC	1966	M4-	1966 World Rowing Championships
161	Peter Philp	VIC	1966	M4-	1966 World Rowing Championships
162	John Ranch	NSW	1966	M4+	1966 World Rowing Championships
163	Chris Stevens	NSW	1966	M4+	1966 World Rowing Championships
164	Peter Dickson	NSW	1966	M4+	1966 World Rowing Championships
165	Brian Thomas	NSW	1966	M4+	1966 World Rowing Championships
166	Mal McKenzie	VIC	1966	M8+	1966 World Rowing Championships
167	Graeme Boykett	VIC	1966	M8+	1966 World Rowing Championships
168	John Stuckey	VIC	1966	M8+	1966 World Rowing Championships
169	Tom Daffy	VIC	1966	M8+	1966 World Rowing Championships
170	Stephen Gillon	VIC	1967	M4+	1967 North American and US Championships
171	David Douglas	VIC	1967	M4+	1967 North American and US Championships
172	John Narry	VIC	1967	M4+	1967 North American and US Championships
173	Not allocated				
174	Terry Hayes	NSW	1967	M8+	1967 North American and US Championships
175	Ian McWhirter	NSW	1967	M8+	1967 North American and US Championships
176	Lindsay Freeman	NSW	1967	M8+	1967 North American and US Championships
177	Reg Free	TAS	1967	M8+	1967 North American and US Championships
178	Michael Morgan	NSW	1967	M8+	1967 North American and US Championships
179	Brian Denny	NSW	1967	M8+	1967 North American and US Championships
180	Joe Fazio	NSW	1968	M8+	1968 Tokyo Olympics
181	Jeff Watt	VIC	1970	M2-	1970 World Rowing Championships
182	Chris King	TAS	1970	M2+	1970 World Rowing Championships
183	John Shanasy	VIC	1970	M2+	1970 World Rowing Championships
184	David Rattray	TAS	1970	M4+	1970 World Rowing Championships
185	Victor Gibson	TAS	1970	M4+	1970 World Rowing Championships
186	Tim McKay	TAS	1970	M4+	1970 World Rowing Championships
187	Roger Manton	TAS	1970	M4+	1970 World Rowing Championships
188	Rod Elleway	SA	1970	M8+	1970 World Rowing Championships
189	Jack Hume	SA	1970	M8+	1970 World Rowing Championships
190	Kerry Jelbart	VIC	1970	M8+	1970 World Rowing Championships
191	Geoff Godkin	VIC	1970	M8+	1970 World Rowing Championships
192	Kim Mackney	NSW	1972	M2-	1972 Munich Olympics
193	John Lee	NSW	1972	M4+	1972 Munich Olympics
194	Phillip Wilkinson	NSW	1972	M4+	1972 Munich Olympics
195	Will Baillieu	VIC	1972	M4+	1972 Munich Olympics
196	Peter Shakespear	WA	1972	M4+	1972 Munich Olympics
197	Vern Bowrey	NSW	1972	M4+	1972 Munich Olympics
198	Malcolm Shaw	NSW	1972	M8+	1972 Munich Olympics
199	Robert Paver	NSW	1972	M8+	1972 Munich Olympics
200	Richard Curtin	NSW	1972	M8+	1972 Munich Olympics
201	John Clark	NSW	1972	M8+	1972 Munich Olympics
202	Bryan Curtin	NSW	1972	M8+	1972 Munich Olympics
203	Shirley Graham	QLD	1972	W1x	1972 European Rowing Championships
204	Jeff Sykes	VIC	1973	M1x	1973 European Rowing Championships
205	Tim Conrad	NSW	1973	M2-	1973 European Rowing Championships
206	Gary Dehring	WA	1973	M4+	1973 European Rowing Championships
207	Bill Dankbaar	SA	1973	M4+	1973 European Rowing Championships
208	Will Liley	VIC	1973	M4+	1973 European Rowing Championships
209	Laurie Anderson	WA	1973	M4+	1973 European Rowing Championships
210	Brian Tonkin	WA	1973	M4+	1973 European Rowing Championships
211	Evelyn Adams	NSW	1974	W2-	1974 World Rowing Championships
212	Lydia Miladinovic	NSW	1974	W2-	1974 World Rowing Championships
213	George Petelin	QLD	1974	M1x	1974 World Rowing Championships
214	Bryan Weir	NSW	1974	M2-	1974 World Rowing Championships
215	Steve Newnham	NSW	1974	M2-	1974 World Rowing Championships
216	Gavin Jenner	WA	1974	M4-	1974 World Rowing Championships
217	William Magennis	VIC	1974	M4-	1974 World Rowing Championships
218	Ted O'Loughlin	NSW	1974	M8+	1974 World Rowing Championships
219	Ian Luxford	NSW	1974	M8+	1974 World Rowing Championships
220	Chris Shinners	NSW	1974	M8+	1974 World Rowing Championships
221	Joe Donnelly	NSW	1974	M8+	1974 World Rowing Championships
222	Colin Smith	VIC	1974	ML4-	1974 World Rowing Championships
223	Geoff Rees	VIC	1974	ML4-	1974 World Rowing Championships
224	Andrew Michelmore	VIC	1974	ML4-	1974 World Rowing Championships
225	Campbell Johnstone	VIC	1974	ML4-	1974 World Rowing Championships
226	Sally Harding	VIC	1975	W4+	1975 World Rowing Championships
227	Vivian Roe	VIC	1975	W4+	1975 World Rowing Championships
228	Pam Murray	VIC	1975	W4+	1975 World Rowing Championships
229	Wendy John	VIC	1975	W4+	1975 World Rowing Championships
230	Jan Coxhead	VIC	1975	W4+	1975 World Rowing Championships
231	Robert Alexander	QLD	1975	M1x	1975 World Rowing Championships
232	William Newton	NSW	1975	M2x	1975 World Rowing Championships
233	Dick Reddell	NSW	1975	M2x	1975 World Rowing Championships
234	Michael Crowley	NSW	1975	M2+	1975 World Rowing Championships
235	Terry O'Hanlon	NSW	1975	M2+	1975 World Rowing Championships
236	Simon Dean	TAS	1975	M8+	1975 World Rowing Championships
237	Ian Clubb	NSW	1975	M8+	1975 World Rowing Championships
238	Brian Richardson	VIC	1975	M8+	1975 World Rowing Championships
239	Paul Rowe	NSW	1975	ML1x	1975 World Rowing Championships
240	Ted Hale	NSW	1976	M1x	1976 Montreal Olympics
241	Athol MacDonald	NSW	1976	M8+	1976 Montreal Olympics
242	Gary Uebergang	NSW	1976	M8+	1976 Montreal Olympics
243	Islay Lee	NSW	1976	M8+	1976 Montreal Olympics
244	Stuart Carter	NSW	1976	M8+	1976 Montreal Olympics
245	Anne Chirnside	VIC	1977	W4+	1977 World Rowing Championships
246	Vicki Spooner	NSW	1977	W4+	1977 World Rowing Championships
247	Jillian McCure	NSW	1977	W4+	1977 World Rowing Championships
248	Murray Ross	VIC	1977	M8+	1977 World Rowing Championships
249	Ian Paver	NSW	1977	M8+	1977 World Rowing Championships
250	Stephen Handley	NSW	1977	M8+	1977 World Rowing Championships
251	David Clark	NSW	1977	M8+	1977 World Rowing Championships
252	Tony Brown	NSW	1977	M8+	1977 World Rowing Championships
253	Gordon Clubb	NSW	1977	M8+	1977 World Rowing Championships
254	Stephen Saunders	WA	1977	M8+	1977 World Rowing Championships
255	John Bailey	NSW	1977	ML1x	1977 World Rowing Championships
256	Peter Antonie	VIC	1977	ML4-	1977 World Rowing Championships
257	Simon Gillett	VIC	1977	ML4-	1977 World Rowing Championships
258	Phillip Gardiner	VIC	1977	ML8+	1977 World Rowing Championships
259	Malcolm Robertson	VIC	1977	ML8+	1977 World Rowing Championships
260	Phillip Ainsworth	VIC	1977	ML8+	1977 World Rowing Championships
261	Rodney Stewart	VIC	1977	ML8+	1977 World Rowing Championships
262	Ian Porter	VIC	1977	ML8+	1977 World Rowing Championships
263	Alan de Belin	NSW	1977	ML8+	1977 World Rowing Championships
264	John Hawkins	VIC	1977	ML8+	1977 World Rowing Championships
265	David England	VIC	1977	ML8+	1977 World Rowing Championships
266	Shanne McGinnis	TAS	1978	W4x+	1978 World Rowing Championships
267	Elizabeth Monti	NSW	1978	W4x+	1978 World Rowing Championships
268	Wendy Alexander	QLD	1978	W4x+	1978 World Rowing Championships
269	Leisa Paterson	VIC	1978	W4x+	1978 World Rowing Championships
270	Not allocated				
271	Maureen Revington	NSW	1978	W8+	1978 World Rowing Championships
272	Barbara Griffiths	VIC	1978	W8+	1978 World Rowing Championships
273	Jenny Dalziell	NSW	1978	W8+	1978 World Rowing Championships
274	Pam Westendorf	VIC	1978	W8+	1978 World Rowing Championships
275	Verna Westwood	WA	1978	W8+	1978 World Rowing Championships
276	Barbara Henrich	SA	1978	W8+	1978 World Rowing Championships
277	Dale Henrich	SA	1978	W8+	1978 World Rowing Championships
278	Jasmine Jarvis	NSW	1978	W8+	1978 World Rowing Championships
279	Robert McGowan	NSW	1978	M2x	1978 World Rowing Championships
280	Rob Lang	SA	1978	M2-	1978 World Rowing Championships
281	John Bolt	SA	1978	M2-	1978 World Rowing Championships
282	Brenton Parson	SA	1978	M2+	1978 World Rowing Championships
283	Tim Young	VIC	1978	M4-	1978 World Rowing Championships
284	James Lowe	VIC	1978	M4-	1978 World Rowing Championships
285	Henry Duncan	SA	1978	M4+	1978 World Rowing Championships
286	Andrew Withers	VIC	1978	M4+	1978 World Rowing Championships
287	Martin Aitken	VIC	1978	M4+	1978 World Rowing Championships
288	Jim Stride	NSW	1978	M8+	1978 World Rowing Championships
289	John Sivewright	NSW	1978	M8+	1978 World Rowing Championships
290	Not allocated				
291	Andrew McKinley	VIC	1978	ML1x	1978 World Rowing Championships
292	Vaughan Bollen	SA	1978	ML4-	1978 World Rowing Championships
293	Dennis Hatcher	VIC	1978	ML8+	1978 World Rowing Championships
294	Bob Cooper	SA	1978	ML8+	1978 World Rowing Championships
295	Lyall McCarthy	NSW	1978	ML8+	1978 World Rowing Championships
296	Adrian Maginn	VIC	1978	ML8+	1978 World Rowing Championships
297	Mary Renouf	VIC	1979	W1x	1979 World Rowing Championships
298	Susie Palfreyman	VIC	1979	W4+	1979 World Rowing Championships
299	Stephen Shirrefs	VIC	1979	M2-	1979 World Rowing Championships
300	Alex Sloan	VIC	1979	M2-	1979 World Rowing Championships
301	Anthony Anisimoff	NSW	1979	M4-	1979 World Rowing Championships
302	Phil Winkworth	NSW	1979	M4-	1979 World Rowing Championships
303	Noel Donaldson	VIC	1979	M8+	1979 World Rowing Championships
304	Stephen Spurling	VIC	1979	ML1x	1979 World Rowing Championships
305	Geoff Webb	NSW	1979	ML4-	1979 World Rowing Championships
306	Gary Hefer	NSW	1979	ML4-	1979 World Rowing Championships
307	Clyde Hefer	NSW	1979	ML4-	1979 World Rowing Championships
308	Graham Wearne	NSW	1979	ML4-	1979 World Rowing Championships
309	Michael Smith	NSW	1979	ML8+	1979 World Rowing Championships
310	Tim Willoughby	SA	1980	M8+	1980 Moscow Olympics
311	Not allocated				
312	Graham Gardiner	NSW	1980	ML4-	1980 World Rowing Championships
313	Charles Bartlett	VIC	1980	ML4-	1980 World Rowing Championships
314	Jacqui Marshall	VIC	1981	W2-	1981 World Rowing Championships
315	Graham Jones	NSW	1981	M4+	1981 World Rowing Championships
316	James Battersby	NSW	1981	M4+	1981 World Rowing Championships
317	John Bentley	SA	1981	M4+	1981 World Rowing Championships
318	Michael Sim	VIC	1981	M4+	1981 World Rowing Championships
319	Bruce Keynes	SA	1982	M4+	1982 World Rowing Championships
320	Gavin Thredgold	SA	1982	M4+	1982 World Rowing Championships
321	Robert Allen	NSW	1982	ML1x	1982 World Rowing Championships
322	Neville Kempton	WA	1982	ML8+	1982 World Rowing Championships
323	Simon Cook	VIC	1982	ML8+	1982 World Rowing Championships
324	Bruce House	TAS	1982	ML8+	1982 World Rowing Championships
325	Rob Gardner	VIC	1982	ML8+	1982 World Rowing Championships
326	David Fisher	VIC	1982	ML8+	1982 World Rowing Championships
327	Timothy McLaren	NSW	1983	M1x	1983 World Rowing Championships
328	Samuel Patten	VIC	1983	M8+	1983 World Rowing Championships
328A	Mick Partridge	TAS	1982	ML8+	1982 World Rowing Championships
329	Ian Edmunds	QLD	1983	M8+	1983 World Rowing Championships
330	David Doyle	VIC	1983	M8+	1983 World Rowing Championships
331	Ion Popa	VIC	1983	M8+	1983 World Rowing Championships
332	John Quigley	SA	1983	M8+	1983 World Rowing Championships
333	Allan Pollock	NSW	1983	ML1x	1983 World Rowing Championships
334	Brian Digby	VIC	1983	ML8+	1983 World Rowing Championships
335	Paul Harvey	TAS	1983	ML8+	1983 World Rowing Championships
336	Greg Raszyk	WA	1983	ML8+	1983 World Rowing Championships
337	Richard Hay	WA	1983	ML8+	1983 World Rowing Championships
338	Ian Jordan	TAS	1983	ML8+	1983 World Rowing Championships
339	Graeme Barns	VIC	1983	ML8+	1983 World Rowing Championships
340	Robyn Grey-Gardner	SA	1984	W4+	1984 Los Angeles Olympics
341	Karen Brancourt	NSW	1984	W4+	1984 Los Angeles Olympics
342	Susan Chapman	VIC	1984	W4+	1984 Los Angeles Olympics
343	Margot Foster	VIC	1984	W4+	1984 Los Angeles Olympics
344	Susan Lee	VIC	1984	W4+	1984 Los Angeles Olympics
345	Paul Reedy	VIC	1984	M4x	1984 Los Angeles Olympics
346	Gary Gullock	VIC	1984	M4x	1984 Los Angeles Olympics
347	Anthony Lovrich	WA	1984	M4x	1984 Los Angeles Olympics
348	Robert Booth	SA	1984	M2-	1984 Los Angeles Olympics
349	Duncan Fisher	QLD	1984	M4-	1984 Los Angeles Olympics
350	Craig Muller	NSW	1984	M8+	1984 Los Angeles Olympics
351	Steve Evans	NSW	1984	M8+	1984 Los Angeles Olympics
352	William Digby	VIC	1984	ML4	1984 World Rowing Championships
353	Stuart Wilson	VIC	1984	ML4	1984 World Rowing Championships
354	Merrick Howes	NSW	1984	ML8+	1984 World Rowing Championships
355	Russell Hookway	TAS	1984	ML8+	1984 World Rowing Championships
356	Dale Caterson	NSW	1984	ML8+	1984 World Rowing Championships
357	Brenton Terrell	SA	1985	M1x	1985 World Rowing Championships
358	Richard Powell	QLD	1985	M4x	1985 World Rowing Championships
359	Martin O'Halloran	VIC	1985	M8+	1985 World Rowing Championships
360	Richard Paterson	NSW	1985	M8+	1985 World Rowing Championships
361	Chester MacDonald	SA	1985	M8+	1985 World Rowing Championships
362	Andrew Ambrose	NSW	1985	M8+	1985 World Rowing Championships
363	Stan Humiecki	NSW	1985	M8+	1985 World Rowing Championships
364	Joel Mayne	SA	1985	M8+	1985 World Rowing Championships
365	Ian Belot	VIC	1985	M8+	1985 World Rowing Championships
366	James Tomkins	VIC	1985	M8+	1985 World Rowing Championships
367	Adair Ferguson	QLD	1985	WL1x	1985 World Rowing Championships
368	Gayle Toogood	VIC	1985	WL4-	1985 World Rowing Championships
369	Amanda Cross	SA	1985	WL4-	1985 World Rowing Championships
370	Denise Rennex	NSW	1985	WL4-	1985 World Rowing Championships
371	Karin Riedel	SA	1985	WL4-	1985 World Rowing Championships
372	Joe Joyce	VIC	1985	ML8+	1985 World Rowing Championships
373	Derek Mollison	VIC	1985	ML8+	1985 World Rowing Championships
374	Robert Rowlands	SA	1985	ML8+	1985 World Rowing Championships
375	Annelies Voorthuis	NSW	1986	W2-	1986 World Rowing Championships
376	Marilyn Kidd	NSW	1986	W4+	1986 World Rowing Championships
377	Deborah Bassett	VIC	1986	W4+	1986 World Rowing Championships
378	Kay Fry	VIC	1986	W4+	1986 World Rowing Championships
379	James Galloway	NSW	1986	M8+	1986 World Rowing Championships
380	Malcolm Batten	QLD	1986	M8+	1986 World Rowing Championships
381	Andrew Cooper	VIC	1986	M8+	1986 World Rowing Championships
382	Mike McKay	VIC	1986	M8+	1986 World Rowing Championships
383	Mark Doyle	VIC	1986	M8+	1986 World Rowing Championships
384	Virginia Lee	NSW	1986	WL4-	1986 World Rowing Championships
385	Deborah Clingeleffer	NSW	1986	WL4-	1986 World Rowing Championships
386	Alison Smith	SA	1986	W2-	1986 Commonwealth Games
387	Catherine Hall	VIC	1986	W2-	1986 Commonwealth Games
388	Not allocated				
389	Urszula Stanny	TAS	1986	W8+	1986 Commonwealth Games
390	Glenn Myler	TAS	1986	M2-	1986 Commonwealth Games
391	Neil Myers	VIC	1986	M4-	1986 Commonwealth Games
392	Rachel McInnes	VIC	1987	W4+	1987 World Rowing Championships
393	Felicity McCall	VIC	1987	W4+	1987 World Rowing Championships
394	Richard Howden	VIC	1987	M2-	1987 World Rowing Championships
395	Peter Tomanovits	VIC	1987	M2-	1987 World Rowing Championships
396	Hamish McLachlan	SA	1987	M4+	1987 World Rowing Championships
397	Richard Finlayson	NSW	1987	M4+	1987 World Rowing Championships
398	Richard Graham	QLD	1987	M4+	1987 World Rowing Championships
399	Nick Sellars	SA	1987	M4+	1987 World Rowing Championships
400	Hamish McGlashan	VIC	1987	M8+	1987 World Rowing Championships
401	Leeanne Whitehouse	VIC	1987	WL4-	1987 World Rowing Championships
402	Marina Cade	VIC	1987	WL4+	1987 World Rowing Championships
403	Tom Sanchez	VIC	1987	ML8+	1987 World Rowing Championships
404	Nick Hunter	ACT	1987	ML8+	1987 World Rowing Championships
405	Andrew McCubbery	VIC	1987	ML8+	1987 World Rowing Championships
406	Lynton Hudson	QLD	1987	ML8+	1987 World Rowing Championships
407	Bruce Hick	ACT	1987	ML8+	1987 World Rowing Championships
408	Andrew Cox	NSW	1987	ML8+	1987 World Rowing Championships
409	Brigid Cassells	ACT	1988	WL4-	1988 World Rowing Championships
410	Justine Carroll	NSW	1988	WL4-	1988 World Rowing Championships
411	David Power	QLD	1988	ML4-	1988 World Rowing Championships
412	Rod Birt	QLD	1988	ML4-	1988 World Rowing Championships
413	Kate Dearden	QLD	1989	W2-	1989 World Rowing Championships
414	Stephen Nesbitt	SA	1989	M4-	1989 World Rowing Championships
415	Peter Murphy	NSW	1989	M4-	1989 World Rowing Championships
416	Cory Bernardi	SA	1989	M4	1989 World Rowing Championships
417	Tony Johnson	VIC	1989	M4-	1989 World Rowing Championships
418	Linda Boldt	VIC	1989	WL4-	1989 World Rowing Championships
419	Gini Skinner	VIC	1989	WL4-	1989 World Rowing Championships
420	Rebecca Joyce	VIC	1989	WL4-	1989 World Rowing Championships
421	Sally Ninham	ACT	1989	WL4-	1989 World Rowing Championships
422	Nick Weston	VIC	1989	ML4-	1989 World Rowing Championships
423	Tim Brew	VIC	1989	ML4-	1989 World Rowing Championships
424	Simon Pringle	VIC	1989	ML4-	1989 World Rowing Championships
425	David Belcher	SA	1989	ML4-	1989 World Rowing Championships
426	Jennifer Luff	NSW	1990	W2x	1990 World Rowing Championships
427	Gillian Campbell	NSW	1990	W2x	1990 World Rowing Championships
428	Anna McFarlane	VIC	1990	W2-	1990 World Rowing Championships
429	Samantha Stewart	VIC	1990	W2-	1990 World Rowing Championships
430	Andrea Coss	WA	1990	W4-	1990 World Rowing Championships
431	Josslyn Else	SA	1990	W4-	1990 World Rowing Championships
432	Jodie Dobson	VIC	1990	W8+	1990 World Rowing Championships
433	Cathy Stock	ACT	1990	W8+	1990 World Rowing Championships
434	Ballanda Sack	ACT	1990	W8+	1990 World Rowing Championships
435	Courtney Johnston	QLD	1990	W8+	1990 World Rowing Championships
436	Robin Bakker	QLD	1990	M4x	1990 World Rowing Championships
437	Jason Day	VIC	1990	M4x	1990 World Rowing Championships
438	Nick Green	VIC	1990	M4-	1990 World Rowing Championships
439	Andrew Muller	VIC	1990	M4+	1990 World Rowing Championships
440	David Colvin	VIC	1990	M4+	1990 World Rowing Championships
441	Simon Guerke	NSW	1990	M8+	1990 World Rowing Championships
442	Nick McDonald-Crowley	NSW	1990	M8+	1990 World Rowing Championships
443	Warwick Hooper	VIC	1990	M8+	1990 World Rowing Championships
444	Bruce McWatt	TAS	1990	M8+	1990 World Rowing Championships
445	James Baker	VIC	1990	M8+	1990 World Rowing Championships
446	Simon Spriggs	VIC	1990	M8+	1990 World Rowing Championships
447	Rob Scott	WA	1990	M8+	1990 World Rowing Championships
448	Matthew Dingle	VIC	1990	M8+	1990 World Rowing Championships
449	Shelley Murtagh	QLD	1990	WL2x	1990 World Rowing Championships
450	Sandra Harvey	TAS	1990	WL2x	1990 World Rowing Championships
451	Tim Wise	VIC	1990	ML1x	1990 World Rowing Championships
452	Sam Golding	VIC	1990	ML2x	1990 World Rowing Championships
453	Simon Burgess	TAS	1990	ML4x	1990 World Rowing Championships
454	Gary Lynagh	QLD	1990	ML4x	1990 World Rowing Championships
455	Stephen Hawkins	TAS	1990	ML4x	1990 World Rowing Championships
456	Gavin Russell	SA	1990	ML4	1990 World Rowing Championships
457	John Keogh	TAS	1990	ML4	1990 World Rowing Championships
458	Ian Rycroft	VIC	1990	ML8+	1990 World Rowing Championships
459	William Peden	VIC	1990	ML8+	1990 World Rowing Championships
460	Simon Morrison	VIC	1990	ML8+	1990 World Rowing Championships
461	Peter Scott	VIC	1990	ML8+	1990 World Rowing Championships
462	Fleur Spriggs	QLD	1991	W2-	1991 World Rowing Championships
463	Emmy Snook	WA	1991	W4-	1991 World Rowing Championships
464	Megan Still	NSW	1991	W4-	1991 World Rowing Championships
465	Kate Slatter	SA	1991	W4-	1991 World Rowing Championships
466	Georgia Green	VIC	1991	W8+	1991 World Rowing Championships
467	Craig Jones	ACT	1991	M4x	1991 World Rowing Championships
468	Richard Roach	NSW	1991	M8+	1991 World Rowing Championships
469	Matthew Roach	NSW	1991	M8+	1991 World Rowing Championships
470	David Weightman	QLD	1991	M8+	1991 World Rowing Championships
471	Not allocated				
472	Sue Herold	VIC	1991	WL2x	1991 World Rowing Championships
473	Tamsin Angus-Leppan	NSW	1991	WL4-	1991 World Rowing Championships
474	Deirdre Fraser	VIC	1991	WL4-	1991 World Rowing Championships
475	Matthew Weir	SA	1991	ML4-	1991 World Rowing Championships
476	Raoul Luescher	VIC	1991	ML8+	1991 World Rowing Championships
477	Simon Langenbacher	VIC	1991	ML8+	1991 World Rowing Championships
478	Matthew McArdle	VIC	1992	M2-	1992 Barcelona Olympics
479	Wayne Diplock	QLD	1992	M8+	1992 Barcelona Olympics
480	Jaime Fernandez	SA	1992	M8+	1992 Barcelona Olympics
481	Ben Dodwell	VIC	1992	M8+	1992 Barcelona Olympics
482	Boden Hanson	QLD	1992	M8+	1992 Barcelona Olympics
483	Liz Moller	ACT	1992	WL4	1992 World Rowing Championships
484	Marina Hatzakis	QLD	1993	W2x	1993 World Rowing Championships
485	Victoria Toogood	SA	1993	W2x	1993 World Rowing Championships
486	Alison Davies	SA	1993	W2x	1993 World Rowing Championships
487	Gina Douglas	VIC	1993	W4-	1993 World Rowing Championships
488	Marcus Hanna	NSW	1993	M4+	1993 World Rowing Championships
489	Robert Jahrling	NSW	1993	M4+	1993 World Rowing Championships
490	Brett Hayman	VIC	1993	M4+	1993 World Rowing Championships
491	Shane McLaughlin	NSW	1993	M8+	1993 World Rowing Championships
492	Nick Porzig	WA	1993	M8+	1993 World Rowing Championships
493	Ceinwen Fay	QLD	1993	WL2x	1993 World Rowing Championships
494	Jenny CIarke	NSW	1993	WL2x	1993 World Rowing Championships
495	Jason Tutty	WA	1993	ML4x	1993 World Rowing Championships
496	Chris Ohlrich	QLD	1993	ML4x	1993 World Rowing Championships
497	Anthony Edwards	VIC	1993	ML4x	1993 World Rowing Championships
498	Gavin Hall	VIC	1993	ML2-	1993 World Rowing Championships
499	Ben Reece	SA	1993	ML4-	1993 World Rowing Championships
500	James Seppelt	SA	1993	ML4-	1993 World Rowing Championships
501	Andrew Stunell	SA	1993	ML4-	1993 World Rowing Championships
502	Ned Draydon	SA	1993	ML4-	1993 World Rowing Championships
503	Bronwyn Roye	NSW	1994	W1x	1994 World Rowing Championships
504	Amy Safe	SA	1994	W4x	1994 World Rowing Championships
505	Sally Newmarch	SA	1994	W4x	1994 World Rowing Championships
506	Anna Ozolins	SA	1994	W2-	1994 World Rowing Championships
507	Carmen Klomp	SA	1994	W2-	1994 World Rowing Championships
508	Alistair McLachlan	SA	1994	M4x	1994 World Rowing Championships
509	Duncan Free	QLD	1994	M4x	1994 World Rowing Championships
510	Robert Walker	NSW	1994	M2-	1994 World Rowing Championships
511	Richard Wearne	NSW	1994	M2-	1994 World Rowing Championships
512	Anthony Ellis	VIC	1994	M2+	1994 World Rowing Championships
513	Teesaan Koo	NSW	1994	M2+	1994 World Rowing Championships
514	Janusz Hooker	NSW	1994	M4-	1994 World Rowing Championships
515	Annabel Kater	NSW	1994	WL2x	1994 World Rowing Championships
516	Emma Cross	WA	1994	WL4-	1994 World Rowing Championships
517	Elizabeth Moir	WA	1994	WL4	1994 World Rowing Championships
518	Sue Peacock	WA	1994	WL4	1994 World Rowing Championships
519	Tim Hawkins	TAS	1994	ML2x	1994 World Rowing Championships
520	Cy Pearson	QLD	1994	ML4x	1994 World Rowing Championships
521	Stephen Purves	VIC	1994	ML4x	1994 World Rowing Championships
522	Stuart Peele	VIC	1994	ML8+	1994 World Rowing Championships
523	Darren Balmforth	TAS	1994	ML8+	1994 World Rowing Championships
524	Rod McNeil	QLD	1994	ML8+	1994 World Rowing Championships
525	William Webster	VIC	1994	ML8+	1994 World Rowing Championships
526	Angela Holbeck	ACT	1995	W4-	1995 World Rowing Championships
527	Karina Wieland	ACT	1995	W4-	1995 World Rowing Championships
528	Rhett Ayliffe	NSW	1995	M2x	1995 World Rowing Championships
529	Ron Snook	WA	1995	M4x	1995 World Rowing Championships
530	Daniel Burke	NSW	1995	M2+	1995 World Rowing Championships
531	Drew Ginn	VIC	1995	M8+	1995 World Rowing Championships
532	Hugh Baird	WA	1995	M8+	1995 World Rowing Championships
533	Joanne Morgan	NSW	1995	WL2x	1995 World Rowing Championships
534	Brianna Watt	VIC	1995	WL2-	1995 World Rowing Championships
535	Amanda Hinds	VIC	1995	WL2-	1995 World Rowing Championships
536	Haimish Karrasch	QLD	1995	ML4x	1995 World Rowing Championships
537	Andrew Lane	VIC	1995	ML2	1995 World Rowing Championships
538	Jane Robinson	VIC	1996	W4x	1996 Atlanta Olympics
539	Bronwyn Thompson	VIC	1996	W8+	1996 Atlanta Olympics
540	David Cameron	NSW	1996	M1x	1996 Atlanta Olympics
541	Geoff Stewart	NSW	1996	M8+	1996 Atlanta Olympics
542	James Stewart	NSW	1996	M8+	1996 Atlanta Olympics
543	Eliza Blair	VIC	1996	WL2-	1996 World Rowing Championships
544	Justine Joyce	VIC	1996	WL2-	1996 World Rowing Championships
545	Rachael Taylor	VIC	1997	W2-	1997 World Rowing Championships
546	Marcus Free	QLD	1997	M2x	1997 World Rowing Championships
547	Martin Inglis	NSW	1997	M4x	1997 World Rowing Championships
548	Stuart Reside	WA	1997	M4x	1997 World Rowing Championships
549	Stuart McRae	ACT	1997	M2-	1997 World Rowing Championships
550	Alastair Gordon	NSW	1997	M8+	1997 World Rowing Championships
551	David Porzig	WA	1997	M8+	1997 World Rowing Championships
552	Tim Wright	VIC	1997	ML8+	1997 World Rowing Championships
553	Robert Richards	VIC	1997	ML8+	1997 World Rowing Championships
554	Alastair Isherwood	VIC	1997	ML8+	1997 World Rowing Championships
555	Jon Berney	VIC	1997	ML8+	1997 World Rowing Championships
556	Rob Mitchell	NSW	1997	ML8+	1997 World Rowing Championships
557	Michael Wiseman	NSW	1997	ML8+	1997 World Rowing Championships
558	Jodi Winter	NSW	1998	W2	1998 World Rowing Championships
559	Rachael Kininmonth	VIC	1998	W8+	1998 World Rowing Championships
560	Katie Foulkes	VIC	1998	W8+	1998 World Rowing Championships
561	Matthew O'Callaghan	NSW	1998	M4x	1998 World Rowing Championships
562	Peter Hardcastle	NSW	1998	M4x	1998 World Rowing Championships
563	Zachary Kirkham	NSW	1998	M8+	1998 World Rowing Championships
564	Josephine Lips	SA	1998	WL4x	1998 World Rowing Championships
565	Dearne Grant	QLD	1998	WL4x	1998 World Rowing Championships
566	Kerry Knowler	ACT	1999	W4x	1999 World Rowing Championships
567	Amber Bradley	WA	1999	W4x	1999 World Rowing Championships
568	Monique Heinke	NSW	1999	W4x	1999 World Rowing Championships
569	Emily Martin	VIC	1999	W8+	1999 World Rowing Championships
570	Kristina Larsen	NSW	1999	W8+	1999 World Rowing Championships
571	James Burton	QLD	1999	M1x	1999 World Rowing Championships
572	Jonathan Fievez	WA	1999	M2x	1999 World Rowing Championships
573	Christian Ryan	VIC	1999	M8+	1999 World Rowing Championships
574	Nigel Sullivan	VIC	1999	M8+	1999 World Rowing Championships
575	Kisahn Lamshed	SA	1999	WL1x	1999 World Rowing Championships
576	Karl Parker	NSW	1999	ML1x	1999 World Rowing Championships
577	Julia Wilson	NSW	2000	W4x	2000 Sydney Olympics
578	Sally Robbins	WA	2000	W4x	2000 Sydney Olympics
579	Victoria Roberts	NSW	2000	W8+	2000 Sydney Olympics
580	Matthew Long	VIC	2000	M2	2000 Sydney Olympics
581	Stuart Welch	NSW	2000	M8+	2000 Sydney Olympics
582	Amber Halliday	SA	2000	WL4x	2000 World Rowing Championships
583	Sally Causby	SA	2000	WL4x	2000 World Rowing Championships
584	Catriona Roach	NSW	2000	WL4x	2000 World Rowing Championships
585	Matthew Russell	VIC	2000	ML8+	2000 World Rowing Championships
586	Andrew Black	NSW	2000	ML8+	2000 World Rowing Championships
587	Shane Broad	TAS	2000	ML8+	2000 World Rowing Championships
588	Andrew Butler	TAS	2000	ML8+	2000 World Rowing Championships
589	Ben Cureton	WA	2000	ML8+	2000 World Rowing Championships
590	Glen Loftus	WA	2000	ML8+	2000 World Rowing Championships
591	Kenny Chan	WA	2000	ML8+	2000 World Rowing Championships
592	Dana Faletic	TAS	2001	W2x	2001 World Rowing Championships
593	Kelly Matthews	NSW	2001	W4x	2001 World Rowing Championships
594	Donna Martin	ACT	2001	W4x	2001 World Rowing Championships
595	Jo Lutz	WA	2001	W4-	2001 World Rowing Championships
596	Rebecca Sattin	WA	2001	W8+	2001 World Rowing Championships
597	Carly Bilson	NSW	2001	W8+	2001 World Rowing Championships
598	Shaun Coulton	QLD	2001	M4x	2001 World Rowing Championships
599	David Crawshay	VIC	2001	M4x	2001 World Rowing Championships
600	Brendan Long	TAS	2001	M4x	2001 World Rowing Championships
601	Neil Dennis	WA	2001	M2-	2001 World Rowing Championships
602	Stefan Szczurowski	WA	2001	M2-	2001 World Rowing Championships
603	David Dennis	WA	2001	M8+	2001 World Rowing Championships
604	Robert Douglas	VIC	2001	M8+	2001 World Rowing Championships
605	William Tait	VIC	2001	M8+	2001 World Rowing Championships
606	Nick Baxter	NSW	2001	M8+	2001 World Rowing Championships
607	Cameron McKenzie-McHarg	VIC	2001	M8+	2001 World Rowing Championships
608	Christian Bayliss	NSW	2001	M8+	2001 World Rowing Championships
609	Stephen Stewart	NSW	2001	M8+	2001 World Rowing Championships
610	Michael Toon	QLD	2001	M8+	2001 World Rowing Championships
611	Dan Stewart	NSW	2001	ML2x	2001 World Rowing Championships
612	Samuel Beltz	TAS	2001	ML2-	2001 World Rowing Championships
613	Sam Pullin	VIC	2001	ML8+	2001 World Rowing Championships
614	Mitchell Punch	ACT	2002	M1x	2002 World Rowing Championships
615	Thomas Laurich	NSW	2002	M2+	2002 World Rowing Championships
616	David Matthews	NSW	2002	M4+	2002 World Rowing Championships
617	Luke Pougnault	WA	2002	M4+	2002 World Rowing Championships
618	Paul Myers	VIC	2002	M8+	2002 World Rowing Championships
619	Warren Keeble	VIC	2002	M8+	2002 World Rowing Championships
620	Travis Johnstone	VIC	2002	M8+	2002 World Rowing Championships
621	Karsten Forsterling	VIC	2002	M8+	2002 World Rowing Championships
622	Zita van de Walle	NSW	2002	WL4x	2002 World Rowing Championships
623	Marguerite Houston	QLD	2002	WL4x	2002 World Rowing Championships
624	Miranda Bennett	NSW	2002	WL4x	2002 World Rowing Championships
625	Hannah Every-Hall	VIC	2002	WL4x	2002 World Rowing Championships
626	Peter Taylor	NSW	2002	MAS1x	2002 World Rowing Championships
627	Ben Vines	NSW	2002	AMix4+	2002 World Rowing Championships
628	Brett Horton	NSW	2002	AMix4+	2002 World Rowing Championships
629	Ben Felten	NSW	2002	AMix4+	2002 World Rowing Championships
630	Glenn Blackley	NSW	2002	AMix4+	2002 World Rowing Championships
631	Susie Edwards	NSW	2002	AMix4+	2002 World Rowing Championships
632	Elizabeth Kell	NSW	2003	W2x	2003 World Rowing Championships
633	Catriona Oliver	VIC	2003	W2x	2003 World Rowing Championships
634	Kerry Hore	(TAS)	2003	W4x	2003 World Rowing Championships
635	Alexandra Doyle	NSW	2003	W2-	2003 World Rowing Championships
636	Kyrsten Winkley	NSW	2003	W2-	2003 World Rowing Championships
637	Kyeema Doyle	NSW	2003	W8+	2003 World Rowing Championships
638	Marc Douez	VIC	2003	M2+	2003 World Rowing Championships
639	James Chapman	NSW	2003	M4-	2003 World Rowing Championships
640	David McGowan	WA	2003	M8+	2003 World Rowing Championships
641	Lachlan McPherson	VIC	2003	M8+	2003 World Rowing Championships
642	Not allocated				
643	Bronwen Watson	NSW	2003	WL4x	2003 World Rowing Championships
644	George Jelbart	VIC	2003	ML1x	2003 World Rowing Championships
645	Deon Birtwistle	TAS	2003	ML4x	2003 World Rowing Championships
646	Michael McBryde	QLD	2003	ML4x	2003 World Rowing Championships
647	Tim O'Callaghan	NSW	2003	ML4-	2003 World Rowing Championships
648	Jennifer Emerson	NSW	2003	Mix A4+	2003 World Rowing Championships
649	Julia Veness-Collins	NSW	2003	Mix A4+	2003 World Rowing Championships
650	Gene Barrett	NSW	2003	Mix A4+	2003 World Rowing Championships
651	Sarah Outhwaite	WA	2004	W8+	2004 Athens Olympics
652	Scott Brennan	TAS	2004	M4x	2004 Athens Olympics
653	Cameron Wurf	TAS	2004	ML2x	2004 Athens Olympics
654	Megan Everitt	QLD	2004	W4-	2004 World Rowing Championships
655	Amy Charlick	SA	2004	W4-	2004 World Rowing Championships
656	Sonia Mills	ACT	2004	W4-	2004 World Rowing Championships
657	Robyn Selby Smith	VIC	2004	W4-	2004 World Rowing Championships
658	Ben McGeachie	QLD	2004	M4+	2004 World Rowing Championships
659	Sam Conrad	QLD	2004	M4+	2004 World Rowing Championships
660	Tim Deveson	VIC	2004	M4+	2004 World Rowing Championships
661	Louise Auld	SA	2004	WL4x	2004 World Rowing Championships
662	Kirsty Fleming	TAS	2004	WL4x	2004 World Rowing Championships
663	Jacqui Bain	SA	2004	WL4x	2004 World Rowing Championships
664	George Roberts	TAS	2004	ML8+	2004 World Rowing Championships
665	Samuel Waley	TAS	2004	ML8+	2004 World Rowing Championships
666	Ross Brown	WA	2004	ML8+	2004 World Rowing Championships
667	Kaspar Hebblewhite	TAS	2004	ML8+	2004 World Rowing Championships
668	Thomas Gibson	TAS	2004	ML8+	2004 World Rowing Championships
669	Tom Nicholls	WA	2004	ML8+	2004 World Rowing Championships
670	Tim Smith	VIC	2004	ML8+	2004 World Rowing Championships
671	Sally Kehoe	QLD	2005	W2x	2005 World Rowing Championships
672	Natalie Bale	WA	2005	W2-	2005 World Rowing Championships
673	Pauline Frasca	VIC	2005	W4-	2005 World Rowing Championships
674	Kate Hornsey	TAS	2005	W4-	2005 World Rowing Championships
675	Fleur Chew	VIC	2005	W8+	2005 World Rowing Championships
676	Sarah Heard	VIC	2005	W8+	2005 World Rowing Championships
677	Elizabeth Patrick	VIC	2005	W8+	2005 World Rowing Championships
678	Chris Morgan	SA	2005	M4x	2005 World Rowing Championships
679	Trent Collins	SA	2005	M4x	2005 World Rowing Championships
680	Hardy Cubasch	QLD	2005	M2+	2005 World Rowing Championships
681	Matt Ryan	NSW	2005	M4-	2005 World Rowing Championships
682	Jeremy Stevenson	WA	2005	M4-	2005 World Rowing Championships
683	James Gatti	WA	2005	M4-	2005 World Rowing Championships
684	Todd Skipworth	WA	2005	ML4-	2005 World Rowing Championships
685	Dominic Monypenny	TAS	2005	MAS1x	2005 World Rowing Championships
686	Claire Shields	TAS	2006	W1x	2006 World Rowing Championships
687	Brooke Pratley	NSW	2006	W2x	2006 World Rowing Championships
688	Catriona Sens	VIC	2006	W4x	2006 World Rowing Championships
689	Sarah Cook	ACT	2006	W8+	2006 World Rowing Championships
690	Kim Crow	VIC	2006	W8+	2006 World Rowing Championships
691	Daniel Noonan	NSW	2006	M4x	2006 World Rowing Championships
692	Jaxon Rudduck	NSW	2006	M4	2006 World Rowing Championships
693	Francis Hegerty	NSW	2006	M4	2006 World Rowing Championships
694	James Marburg	VIC	2006	M8+	2006 World Rowing Championships
695	Marty Rabjohns	NSW	2006	M8+	2006 World Rowing Championships
696	Kristen Mercer	NSW	2006	MixLTA4	2006 World Rowing Championships
697	Zoe Uphill	NSW	2007	W1x	2007 World Rowing Championships
698	Amy Ives	NSW	2007	W4x	2007 World Rowing Championships
699	Phoebe Stanley	VIC	2007	W4-	2007 World Rowing Championships
700	Katelyn Gray	NSW	2007	W4-	2007 World Rowing Championships
701	James McRae	SA	2007	M4x	2007 World Rowing Championships
702	David Kelly	WA	2007	M4x	2007 World Rowing Championships
703	Fergus Pragnell	NSW	2007	M2+	2007 World Rowing Championships
704	Jason Heard	VIC	2007	M2+	2007 World Rowing Championships
705	Samuel Loch	NSW	2007	M4-	2007 World Rowing Championships
706	Alice McNamara	VIC	2007	WL4x	2007 World Rowing Championships
707	Tara Kelly	QLD	2007	WL4x	2007 World Rowing Championships
708	Roderick Chisholm	NSW	2007	ML4-	2007 World Rowing Championships
709	John McLean	NSW	2007	MixTA2x	2007 World Rowing Championships
710	Kathryn Ross	VIC	2007	MixTA2x	2007 World Rowing Championships
711	Phillipa Savage	QLD	2008	W1x	2008 Beijing Olympics
712	Not allocated				
713	Hugh Rawlinson	WA	2008	M2+	2008 World Rowing Championships
714	Ingrid Fenger	TAS	2008	WL4x	2008 World Rowing Championships
715	Robert Hoyes	QLD	2008	ML8+	2008 World Rowing Championships
716	Shaun Finlayson	TAS	2008	ML8+	2008 World Rowing Championships
717	Max Sondermeyer	TAS	2008	ML8+	2008 World Rowing Championships
718	Oliver Zuk	NSW	2008	ML8+	2008 World Rowing Championships
719	Blair Tunevitsch	TAS	2008	ML8+	2008 World Rowing Championships
720	Darryn Purcell	QLD	2008	ML8+	2008 World Rowing Championships
721	Nicholas Baker	TAS	2008	ML8+	2008 World Rowing Championships
722	Perry Ward	WA	2008	ML8+	2008 World Rowing Championships
723	David McGrath	VIC	2008	ML8+	2008 World Rowing Championships
724	Emily Rose	WA	2009	W4-	2009 World Rowing Championships
725	Elizabeth Alderman	WA	2009	W4-	2009 World Rowing Championships
726	Laura Osti	SA	2009	W4-	2009 World Rowing Championships
727	Sophia Robson	VIC	2009	W4-	2009 World Rowing Championships
728	Nick Hudson	NSW	2009	M4x	2009 World Rowing Championships
729	Jared Bidwell	QLD	2009	M4x	2009 World Rowing Championships
730	Tom Larkins	VIC	2009	M8+	2009 World Rowing Championships
731	Joshua Dunkley-Smith	VIC	2009	M8+	2009 World Rowing Championships
732	Mitchell Estens	NSW	2009	M8+	2009 World Rowing Championships
733	Thomas Swann	VIC	2009	M8+	2009 World Rowing Championships
734	Bryn Coudraye	SA	2009	M8+	2009 World Rowing Championships
735	Richard Allsop	NSW	2009	M8+	2009 World Rowing Championships
736	Tobias Lister	NSW	2009	M8+	2009 World Rowing Championships
737	Angus Tyers	VIC	2009	ML4-	2009 World Rowing Championships
738	Thomas Bertrand	VIC	2009	ML4-	2009 World Rowing Championships
739	Ben Houlison	NSW	2009	MAS1x	2009 World Rowing Championships
740	Alexandra Green	NSW	2009	Mix LTA4+	2009 World Rowing Championships
741	Carol Cooke	VIC	2009	Mix LTA4+	2009 World Rowing Championships
742	Peter Siri	QLD	2009	Mix LTA4+	2009 World Rowing Championships
743	Henry Macphillamy	NSW	2009	Mix LTA4+	2009 World Rowing Championships
744	Lisa Brown	VIC	2009	Mix LTA4+	2009 World Rowing Championships
745	Dominic Grimm	NSW	2010	M2+	2010 World Rowing Championships
746	David Webster	VIC	2010	M2+	2010 World Rowing Championships
747	Josh Booth	VIC	2010	M4-	2010 World Rowing Championships
748	John Linke	VIC	2010	M4-	2010 World Rowing Championships
749	Will Lockwood	VIC	2010	M8+	2010 World Rowing Championships
750	Nick Purnell	NSW	2010	M8+	2010 World Rowing Championships
751	Alister Foot	TAS	2010	ML8+	2010 World Rowing Championships
752	Grant Bailey	ACT	2010	MixTA2x	2010 World Rowing Championships
753	Peta White	SA	2011	W4-	2011 World Rowing Championships
754	Renee Chatterton	SA	2011	W4[	2011 World Rowing Championships
755	Alexandra Hayes	WA	2011	WL4x	2011 World Rowing Championships
756	Hannah Jansen	WA	2011	WL4x	2011 World Rowing Championships
757	Maia Simmonds	WA	2011	WL4x	2011 World Rowing Championships
758	Ella Flecker	TAS	2011	WL4x	2011 World Rowing Championships
759	Erik Horrie	QLD	2011	MAS1x	2011 World Rowing Championships
760	Not allocated				
761	Hannah Vermeersch	WA	2012	W8+	2012 London Olympics
762	Tess Gerrand	NSW	2012	W8+	2012 London Olympics
763	Alexandra Hagan	WA	2012	W8+	2012 London Olympics
764	Brodie Buckland	NSW	2012	M2-	2012 London Olympics
765	Gavin Bellis	VIC	2012	MixTA2x	2012 London Olympics
766	Thea Adamson	WA	2012	WL4x	2012 World Rowing Championships
767	Hannah Clark	VIC	2012	WL4x	2012 World Rowing Championships
768	Not allocated				
769	Tim McDonnell	QLD	2012	ML1x	2012 World Rowing Championships
770	Michael Egan	TAS	2012	ML8+	2012 World Rowing Championships
771	Nicholas Silcox	QLD	2012	ML8+	2012 World Rowing Championships
772	Adam Kachyckykj	QLD	2012	ML8+	2012 World Rowing Championships
773	Rebekah Hooper	VIC	2013	W4x	2013 World Rowing Championships
774	Jessica Hall	QLD	2013	W4x	2013 World Rowing Championships
775	Madeleine Edmunds	QLD	2013	W4x	2013 World Rowing Championships
776	Olympia Aldersey	SA	2013	W4x	2013 World Rowing Championships
777	Katrina Bateman	VIC	2013	W2-	2013 World Rowing Championships
778	Charlotte Sutherland	VIC	2013	W4-	2013 World Rowing Championships
779	Lucy Stephan	VIC	2013	W4-	2013 World Rowing Championships
780	Alexander Belonogoff	NSW	2013	M2x	2013 World Rowing Championships
781	Alex Lloyd	NSW	2013	M4-	2013 World Rowing Championships
782	Spencer Turrin	NSW	2013	M4-	2013 World Rowing Championships
783	Ned Kinnear	SA	2013	M8+	2013 World Rowing Championships
784	Cameron Brewer	WA	2013	M8+	2013 World Rowing Championships
785	Angus Moore	ACT	2013	M8+	2013 World Rowing Championships
786	Alexander Hill	SA	2013	M8+	2013 World Rowing Championships
787	George Ellis	VIC	2013	M8+	2013 World Rowing Championships
788	Scott Laidler	QLD	2013	M8+	2013 World Rowing Championships
789	Brendan Murray	WA	2013	M8+	2013 World Rowing Championships
790	Thomas Gatti	WA	2013	M8+	2013 World Rowing Championships
791	Georgia Nesbitt	TAS	2013	WL4x	2013 World Rowing Championships
792	Georgia Miansarow	NSW	2013	WL4x	2013 World Rowing Championships
793	James Wilson	VIC	2013	ML4x	2013 World Rowing Championships
794	Edward de Carvalho	NSW	2013	ML4x	2013 World Rowing Championships
795	Rebecca Daniher	VIC	2013	W2-	2013 World Rowing Championships
796	Jack Price	QLD	2013	ML8+	2013 World Rowing Championships
797	Not allocated				
798	Timothy Widdicombe	WA	2013	ML8+	2013 World Rowing Championships
799	Simon Nola	NSW	2013	ML8+	2013 World Rowing Championships
800	Timothy Webster	VIC	2013	ML8+	2013 World Rowing Championships
801	Jennifer Cleary	VIC	2014	W4x	2014 World Rowing Championships
802	Molly Goodman	SA	2014	W8+	2014 World Rowing Championships
803	Michelle Yann	VIC	2014	W8+	2014 World Rowing Championships
804	Rhys Grant	WA)	2014	M4x	2014 World Rowing Championships
805	Cameron Girdlestone	NSW	2014	M4x	2014 World Rowing Championships
806	Kieran Kobelke	NSW	2014	M4x	2014 World Rowing Championships
807	Christopher Cunningham-Reid	NSW	2014	M2+	2014 World Rowing Championships
808	Joshua Hicks	WA	2014	M8+	2014 World Rowing Championships
809	Laura Dunn	NSW	2014	WL4x	2014 World Rowing Championships
810	Sarah Pound	NSW	2014	WL4x	2014 World Rowing Championships
811	Jeremy McGrath		2014	MixLTA2x	2014 World Rowing Championships
812	Kathleen Murdoch		2014	MixLTA2x	2014 World Rowing Championships
813	Not allocated				
814	Thomas Perry	ACT	2015	LM4x	2015 World Rowing Championships
815	Jonothan Hookway	TAS	2015	LM4x	2015 World Rowing Championships
816	Genevieve Horton	NSW	2015	W2-	2015 World Rowing Championships
817	Jack Hargeaves	NSW	2015	M2-	2015 World Rowing Championships
818	Nicholas Wheatley	NSW	2015	M2-	2015 World Rowing Championships
819	Sara Waitzer	TAS	2015	LTAMix4+	2015 World Rowing Championships
820	David Watts	WA	2015	M4x	2015 World Rowing Championships
821	Alistair Chong	TAS	2015	LTAMix4+	2015 World Rowing Championships
822	Josephine Burnand	NSW	2015	LTAMix4+	2015 World Rowing Championships
823	Georgie Howe	VIC	2015	W8+	2015 World Rowing Championships
824	Rosemary Popa	VIC	2015	W8+	2015 World Rowing Championships
825	Meaghan Volker	TAS	2015	W8+	2015 World Rowing Championships
826	Sarah Banting	VIC	2015	W8+	2015 World Rowing Championships
827	Samuel Hookway	TAS	2015	M8+	2015 World Rowing Championships
828	Brock Ingram	WA	2016	LTAMix4+	2016 Rio Olympics
829	Davinia Lefroy	WA	2016	LTAMix4+	2016 Rio Olympics
830	Fiona Albert	QLD	2016	W8+	2016 Rio Olympics
831	Jessica Morrison	VIC	2016	W8+	2016 Rio Olympics
832	Leah Saunders	NSW	2017	W4x	2017 World Rowing Championships
833	Rowena Meredith	NSW	2017	W4x	2017 World Rowing Championships
834	Caitlin Cronin	QLD	2017	W4x	2017 World Rowing Championships
835	Katrina Werry	VIC	2017	W4-	2017 World Rowing Championships
836	Sarah Hawe	TAS	2017	W4-	2017 World Rowing Championships
837	Amy James	QLD	2017	LW4x	2017 World Rowing Championships
838	Alice Arch	VIC	2017	LW4x	2017 World Rowing Championships
839	Luke Letcher	ACT	2017	M2x	2017 World Rowing Championships
840	Cameron Fowler	WA	2017	LM4x	2017 World Rowing Championships
841	Redmond Matthews	VIC	2017	LM4x	2017 World Rowing Championships
842	James Kerr	WA	2017	LM4x	2017 World Rowing Championships
843	Hamish Parry	QLD	2017	LM4x	2017 World Rowing Championships
844	Darcy Wruck	QLD	2017	M2+	2017 World Rowing Championships
845	Angus Widdicombe	VIC	2017	M2+	2017 World Rowing Championships
846	James Rook	VIC	2017	M2+	2017 World Rowing Championships
847	Hamish Playfair	NSW	2017	M8+	2017 World Rowing Championships
848	Nathan Bowden	SA	2017	M8+	2017 World Rowing Championships
849	Benjamin Coombs	VIC	2017	M8+	2017 World Rowing Championships
850	Timothy Masters	VIC	2017	M8+	2017 World Rowing Championships
851	Simon Keenan	VIC	2017	M8+	2017 World Rowing Championships
852	Campbell Watts	NSW	2017	M8+	2017 World Rowing Championships
853	Alexander Purnell	NSW	2017	M8+	2017 World Rowing Championships
854	Addy Dunkley-Smith	VIC	2018	W2-	2018 World Rowing Championships
855	Georgina Gotch	NSW	2018	W8+	2018 World Rowing Championships
856	Georgina Rowe	NSW	2018	W8+	2018 World Rowing Championships
857	Annabelle McIntyre	WA	2018	W8+	2018 World Rowing Championships
858	Ciona Wilson	TAS	2018	W8+	2018 World Rowing Championships
859	Jacinta Edmunds	QLD	2018	W8+	2018 World Rowing Championships
860	Emma Fessey	NSW	2018	W8+	2018 World Rowing Championships|-
861	Andrew Judge	NSW	2018	M2-	2018 World Rowing Championships
862	Joseph O'Brien	NSW	2018	M2-	2018 World Rowing Championships
863	Caleb Antill	ACT	2018	M4x	2018 World Rowing Championships
864	Liam Donald	VIC	2018	M8+	2018 World Rowing Championships
865	Robert Black	NSW	2018	M8+	2018 World Rowing Championships
866	Kendall Brodie	NSW	2018	M8+	2018 World Rowing Championships
867	James Talbot	NSW	2018	PR3 M2-	2018 World Rowing Championships
868	Jed Altschwager	SA	2018	PR3 M2-	2018 World Rowing Championships
869	Nikki Ayers	ACT	2018	PR3 Mix4+	2018 World Rowing Championships
870	Alex Vuillermin	VIC	2018	PR3 Mix4+	2018 World Rowing Championships
871	Amanda Bateman	VIC	2019	W2x	2019 World Rowing Championships
872	Renae Domaschenz	ACT	2018	PR3 Mix4+	2018 World Rowing Championships
873	Ben Gibson	NSW	2018	PR3 Mix4+	2018 World Rowing Championships
874	Fiona Ewing	NSW	2019	W4x	2019 World Rowing Championships
875	Cara Grzeskowiak	ACT	2019	W4x	2019 World Rowing Championships
876	Bronwyn Cox	WA	2019	W8+	2019 World Rowing Championships
877	Sean Murphy	NSW	2019	LM1x	2019 World Rowing Championships
878	Leon Chambers	NSW	2019	LM2x	2019 World Rowing Championships
879	David Bartholot	NSW	2019	M2x	2019 World Rowing Championships
880	Sam Hardy	NSW	2019	M2-	2019 World Rowing Championships
881	Alexandra Viney	VIC	2019	PR3 Mix4+	2019 World Rowing Championships
882	William Smith	SA	2019	PR3 M2-	2019 World Rowing Championships
883	Tara Rigney	NSW	2021	W2x	2021 Tokyo Olympics
884	Ria Thompson	VIC	2021	W4x	2021 Tokyo Olympics
885	Harriet Hudson	NSW	2021	W4x	2021 Tokyo Olympics
886	Giorgia Patten	WA	2021	W8+	2021 Tokyo Olympics
887	Jack Cleary	WA	2021	M4x	2021 Tokyo Olympics
888	Nicholas Lavery	VIC	2021	M8+	2021 Tokyo Olympics
889	Angus Dawson	SA	2021	M8+	2021 Tokyo Olympics
890	Stuart Sim	VIC	2021	M8+	2021 Tokyo Olympics
891	Simon Albury	SA	2021	PR2 Mix2x	2020 Tokyo Paralympics
892	Tom Birtwhistle		2021	PR3 Mix4+	2020 Tokyo Paralympics
893	Anneka Reardon	TAS	2022	WLW2X	2022 World Rowing Championships
894	Lucy Coleman	QLD	2022	WLW2X	2022 World Rowing Championships
895	Eliza Gaffney	VIC	2022	W2-	2022 World Rowing Championships
896	Georgie Gleeson	VIC	2022	W2-	2022 World Rowing Championships
897	Kathryn Rowan	QLD	2022	W4X	2022 World Rowing Championships
900	Paige Barr	VIC	2022	W8+	2022 World Rowing Championships
901	Jacqueline Swick	WA	2022	W8+	2022 World Rowing Championships
	Ella Bramwell	SA	2022	W8+	2022 World Rowing Championships
	Eleanor Price	NSW	2022	W8+	2022 World Rowing Championships
	Talia Barnet-Hepples	NSW	2022	W8+	2022 World Rowing Championships
	Harley Moore	QLD	2022	M2-	2022 World Rowing Championships
	Hamish Harding	ACT	2022	MLW1X	2022 World Rowing Championships
905	Oscar McGuinness	SA	2022	MLW2X	2022 World Rowing Championships
	Rohan Lavery	VIC	2022	M8+	2022 World Rowing Championships
	Henry Youl	TAS	2022	M8+	2022 World Rowing Championships
909	Ben Canham	VIC	2022	M8+	2022 World Rowing Championships
	William O'Shannessy	NSW	2022	M8+	2022 World Rowing Championships
	Jackson Kench	NSW	2022	M8+	2022 World Rowing Championships
	Jean Mitchell	VIC	2022	W8+	2022 World Rowing Championships
	Jessica Gallagher	VIC	2022	PR3Mix4+	2022 World Rowing Championships
	Nicholas Neales	ACT	2022	PRM2-	2022 World Rowing Championships
	Alex Rossi	WA	2023	M1X	2023 World Rowing Championships
	Fergus Hamilton	VIC	2023	M2-	2023 World Rowing Championships
	Cormac Kennedy-Leverett	QLD	2023	M2X	2023 World Rowing Championships
	Laura Gourley	NSW	2023	W2X	2023 World Rowing Championships
	Patrick Holt	QLD	2023	M8+	2023 World Rowing Championships
	James Daniel Robertson	VIC	2023	M8+	2023 World Rowing Championships
	Lily Alton-Triggs	QLD	2023	W8	2023 World Rowing Championships
	Hayley Verbunt	VIC	2023	W8+	2023 World Rowing Championships

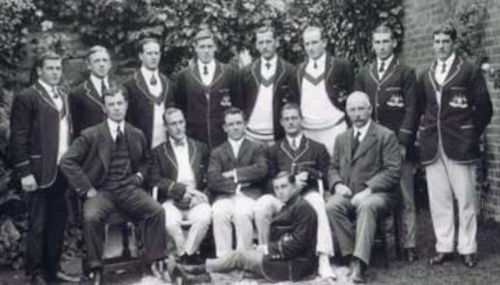
The 1912 Aust Olympic VIII incl reserves & selectors (excepting Ward)
