= Ge Schous =

Dutch rower

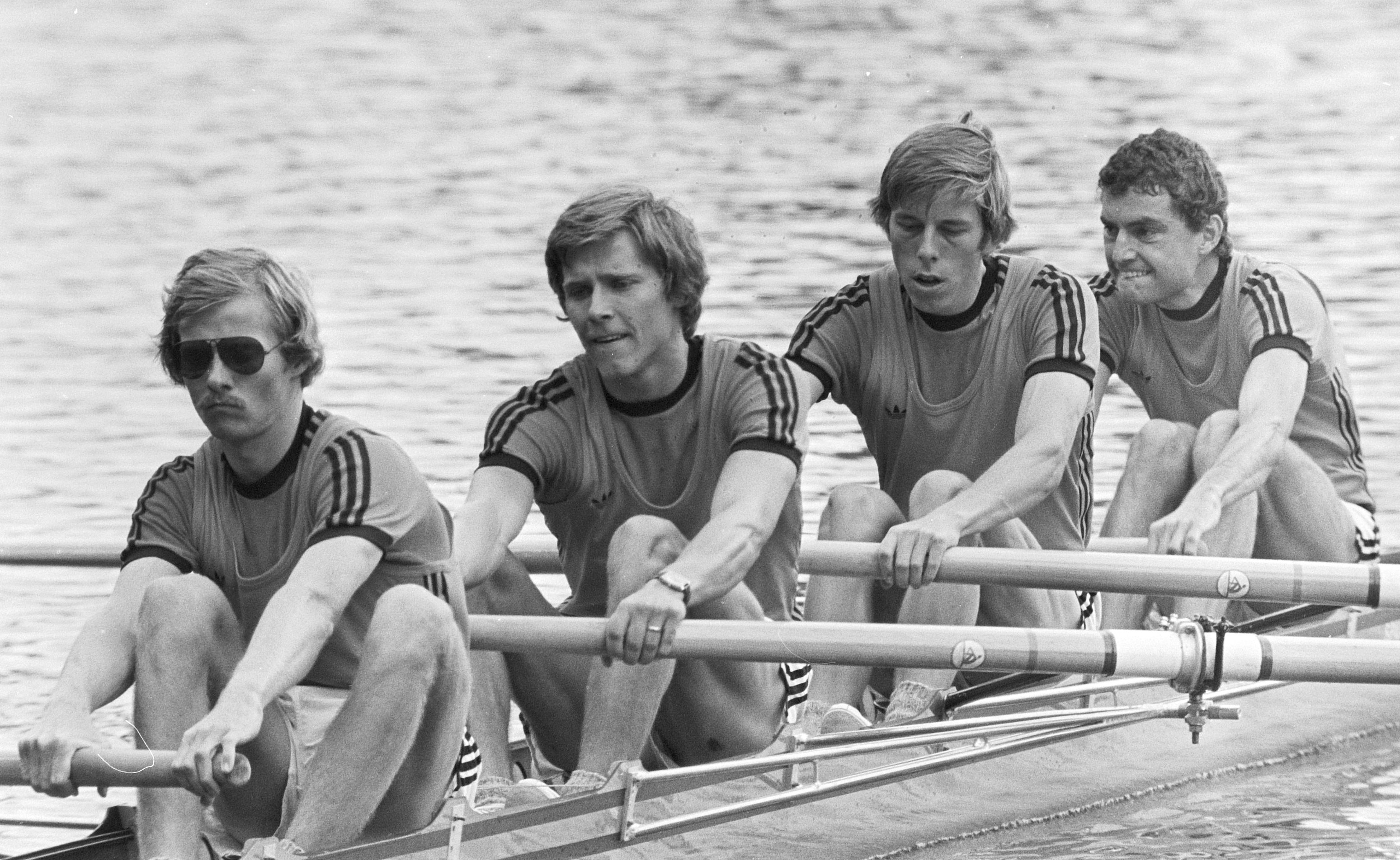
- Schous, Hans Pieterman, Hans Povel and Hans Lycklama at the 1977 World Championships

Sport
- Sport: Rowing
Medal record
Men's rowing
Representing the Netherlands
World Rowing Championships
Bronze medal – third place	1977 Amsterdam	Lwt four

Ge Schous is a retired Dutch lightweight rower who won a bronze medal in the lightweight coxless four at the 1977 World Rowing Championships.
