= Hans Lycklama =

Dutch rower

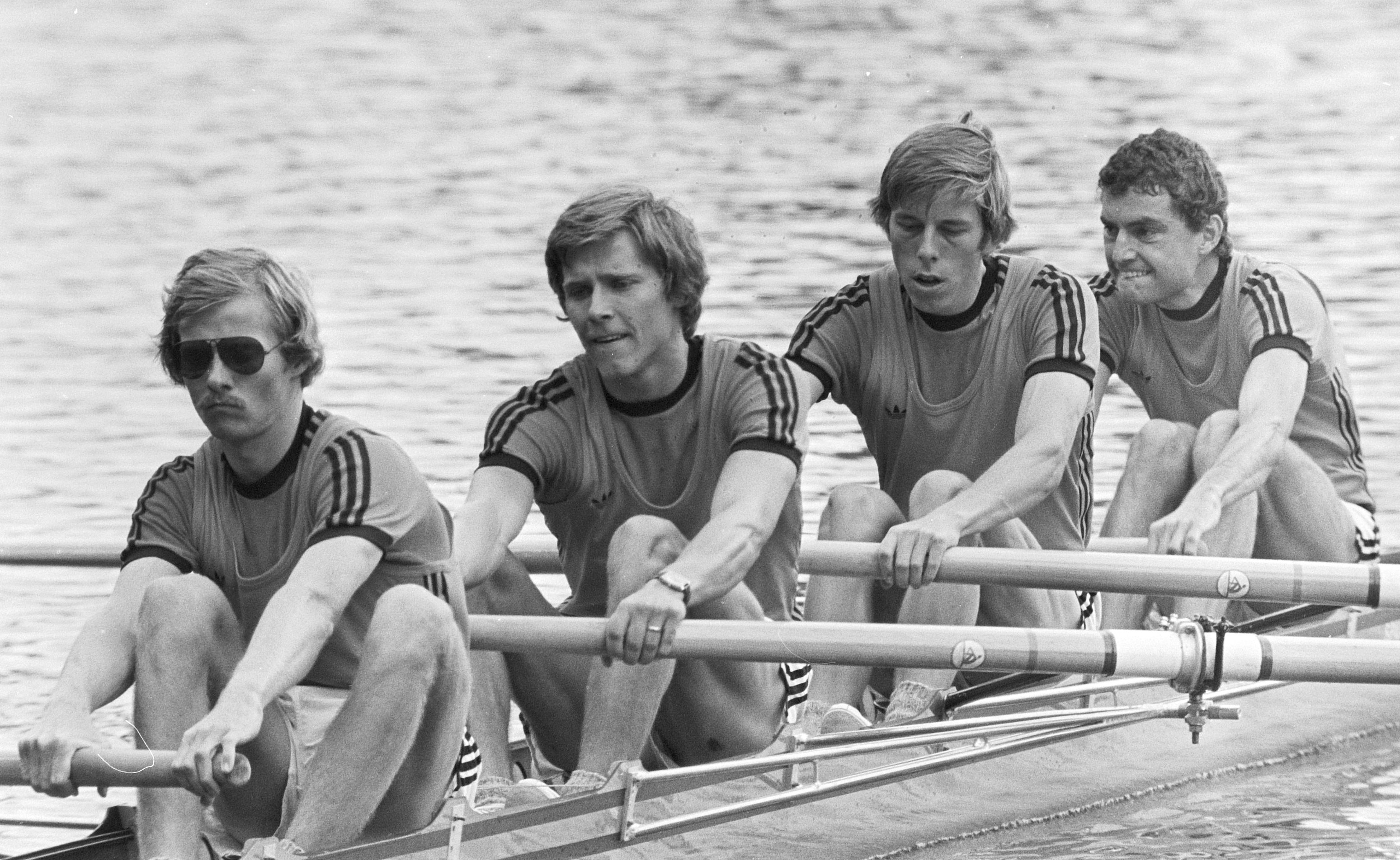
- Ge Schous, Hans Pieterman, Hans Povel, Hans Lycklama in 1977

Personal information
- Born: 1 October 1955 (age 70)

Sport
- Sport: Rowing
Medal record
Men's rowing
Representing the Netherlands
World Rowing Championships
Silver medal – second place	1974 Lucerne	Lwt coxless four
Bronze medal – third place	1977 Amsterdam	Lwt coxless four
Silver medal – second place	1978 Copenhagen	Lwt eight
Bronze medal – third place	1979 Bled	Lwt eight

Hans Lycklama (born 1 October 1955) is a retired Dutch rower and rowing coach who won four medals at the World Lightweight Rowing Championships from 1974 to 1979 in the eight and coxless four. He currently coaches the Dutch national team, including Rianne Sigmond, Maaike Head, Ilse Paulis and Anne Fischer.
