= Shirley Graham =

Shirley Graham may refer to:

- Shirley Graham Du Bois, American-Ghanaian writer
- Shirley Graham (rower), Australian rower

== See also ==
- Graham Shirley, Australian author
