= Malcolm McLean =

Malcolm McLean may refer to:

- Malcom McLean (1913–2001), American businessman
- Malcolm McLean (politician) (1883–1942), member of the Canadian House of Commons

== See also ==
- Malcolm Maclean (disambiguation)
