= Bernd Lindner =

East German rower

Personal information
- Born: 24 April 1956 (age 70) Wolmirstedt

Sport
- Sport: Rowing
Medal record
Men's rowing
Representing East Germany
World Rowing Championships
Gold medal – first place	1977 Amsterdam	Eight

Bernd Lindner (born 24 April 1956) is a German rower who competed for East Germany who is now a national rowing coach.

Lindner was born in 1956 in Wolmirstedt. At the 1973 World Rowing Junior Championships he became world champion in junior men's coxed pair teamed up with Frank Gottschalt. At the 1974 World Rowing Junior Championships he became world champion in junior men's coxed four. At the 1977 World Rowing Championships he became world champion with the men's eight.

Since 1988, Lindner has worked as a rowing coach both at a national level and for HRV "Böllberg/Nelson" in Halle.
