= Paul Stuart-Bennett =

British rower

Personal information
- Born: Second quarter 1952 Ealing

Sport
- Sport: Rowing
- Club: University of London Boat Club; Kingston Rowing Club; Leander Club; Upper Thames Rowing Club; London Rowing Club
Medal record
Men's rowing
Representing Great Britain
World Rowing Championships
Gold medal – first place	1977 Amsterdam	Lwt eight

Christopher Paul Stuart-Bennett (born 1952) is a British lightweight rower.

== Rowing career ==
He was part of the lightweight coxless four at the 1976 World Rowing Championships in Villach, Austria which finished 5th in the B final. He won a gold medal at the 1977 World Rowing Championships in Amsterdam with the lightweight men's eight.

He won the 1973 Stewards' Challenge Cup and the 1977 Thames Challenge Cup at the Henley Royal Regatta.

== Personal life ==
He was a doctor of dentistry by trade.
