= Derek Bond (rower) =

British rower

Personal information
- Nationality: British

Sport
- Sport: Rowing
- Club: London Rowing Club

Derek Bond is a retired British rower who competed for Great Britain.

== Rowing career ==
Bond was part of the coxless four that finished 10th overall and 4th in the B final at the 1977 World Rowing Championships in Amsterdam.
