= Duncan Innes =

British rower

Sport
- Sport: Rowing
- Club: London RC
Medal record
Men's rowing
Representing Great Britain
World Rowing Championships
Gold medal – first place	1977 Amsterdam	Lwt eight
Bronze medal – third place	1980 Hazewinkel	Lwt four

Duncan Innes is a retired lightweight rower who competed for Great Britain.

== Rowing career ==
He won a gold medal at the 1977 World Rowing Championships in Amsterdam with the lightweight men's eight.

== Personal life ==
His son Stewart Innes rowed at the 2016 Summer Olympics.
