= Malcolm Maclean =

Malcolm Maclean may refer to:

- Malcolm Alexander MacLean (1842–1895), first Mayor of Vancouver, British Columbia
- Malcolm Roderick Maclean (1919–2001), politician from Georgia, USA
- Malcolm Maclean, 3rd Chief (fl. 1310s), 3rd Chief of Clan Maclean
- Malcolm MacLean (rower), British rower

== See also ==
- Malcom McLean (1913–2001), American entrepreneur
- Malcolm McLean (politician) (1883–1942), Canadian politician
