= Jeremy Edwards (rower) =

British and Welsh rower

Personal information
- Nationality: British (Welsh)

Sport
- Sport: Rowing
- Club: University of London BC; Monmouth RC London RC

Jeremy Edwards is a retired British and Welsh rower who competed for Great Britain and Wales.

== Rowing career ==
Edwards was part of the GB lightweight coxless four that reached the final and finished fifth at the 1977 World Rowing Championships in Amsterdam.

In 1982 he rowed in the GB lightweight eight that reached the final and finished sixth in the World Rowing Championships in Lucerne.

In 1986 he rowed for Wales at the 1986 Commonwealth Games in the lightweight coxless four, finishing fifth.
