= Cecil McVilly =

Australian rower (1889–1964)

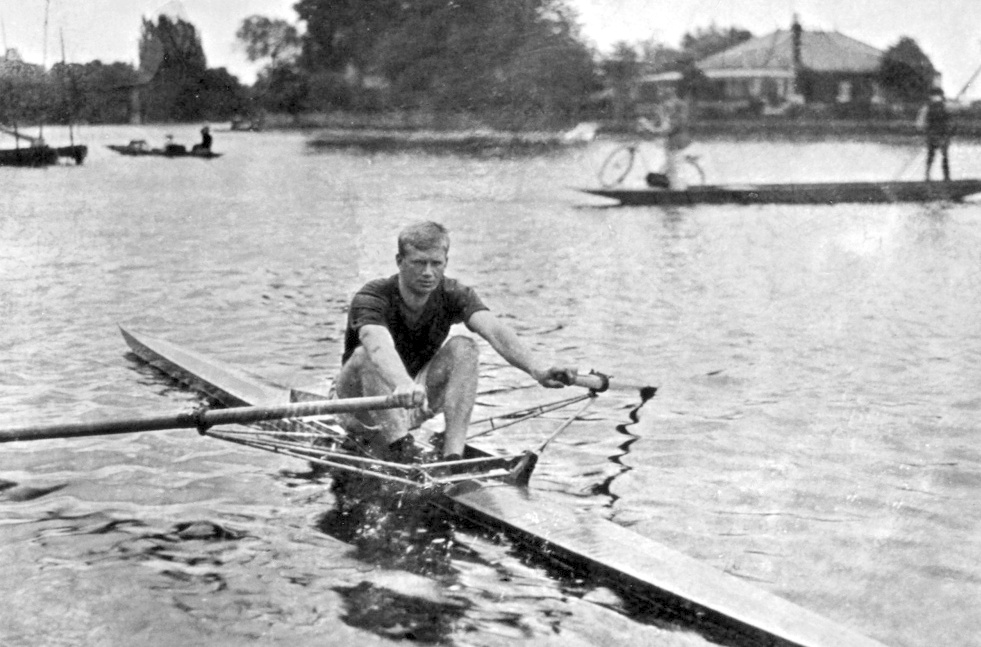
Cecil McVilly in England in 1912

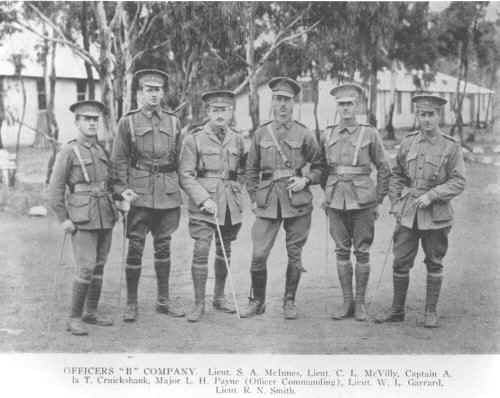
Officers of "B" Coy 40th Bttn.1916 McVilly 2nd from left

Cecil Leventhorpe McVilly MC, (3 August 1889 – 4 November 1964) was an Australian representative rower and WWI military officer. He was a three-time Australian champion sculler and the first sculler to represent Australia at an Olympic games, rowing at the 1912 Summer Olympics; in 1913, he won the Diamond Challenge Sculls at the Henley Royal Regatta. As an AIF Lieutenant in the Tasmanian raised 40th Battalion, he saw action on the Western Front and later in Mesopotamia and the Defence of Baku. He was awarded the Military Cross for his leadership at the 2nd Battle of Messines.

== Early life and rowing career ==
McVilly was born in Hobart, Tasmania, the son of Joseph Henry McVilly, a newspaper editor, and his wife Marion Jane Thompson, née Smith. He was educated at the Hutchins School and Queen's College, Hobart, where he took up rowing. He was a sculler, and from 1908 to 1910, he raced as a Derwent Rowing Club competitor at Hobart Club regattas and Tasmanian state regattas. He won the Maiden Sculls and the Ellis Dean Cup at the Norfolk regatta in 1908, placed second to Fred Coverdale in the Tasmanian Championships in 1909, and placed third at the Hobart regatta in 1910.

Racing as the Tasmanian state entrant, he thrice won the Australian sculling championship at the Interstate Regattas in 1910, 1911 and 1914. In 1911, in planning to defend his Australian title, he trained in Sydney under the former world professional champion George Towns.

In 1912 McVilly first contested the Henley Royal Regatta, racing in the Diamond Challenge Sculls event in Derwent Rowing Club colours. He was beaten by Alexander McCulloch of Leander in his first match race. He went on to the 1912 Stockholm Olympics where he participated in the single sculls rowing for Australasia at the 1912 Summer Olympics. He was disqualified for interference in his first heat following a collision with his German competitor Martin Stahnke.

Following the Olympics McVilly stayed in London, rowing from the London Rowing Club with his sights set on Henley 1913. In the lead-up he won the Challenge Sculls event at the Marlow Regatta. Racing again in Derwent Rowing Club colours at Henley in 1913 he won the Diamond Challenge Sculls beating E Pink . Following his return to Australia, he was again the national sculling champion for a third time in 1914. That year he also coached the Tasmanian eight to their first victory in the men's eight at the Interstate Regatta.

== Military career ==
McVilly had been a senior cadet at school and then served for four years with the Derwent Infantry - a military reserve unit - attaining the rank of Sergeant. In December 1915, he was commissioned a 2nd Lieutenant in the AIF and posted to 'B' Coy, 40th Bttn. a battalion recruited completely from Tasmania as part of the 10th Brigade, 3rd Division. McVilly was promoted to Lieutenant in May 1916 and, in July, embarked aboard HMAT Berrima to England for training. In November 1916, the 3rd Division, including the 40th Bttn, was transferred to France, where McVilly was promoted to captain in December. In early 1917, he was training raiding parties at the Ecole Professionale, Armentières. He led 'B' Coy, 40th Bttn at the 2nd Battle of Messines on 6–7 June 1917 and was awarded the Military Cross for leadership under intensive enemy bombardment. He was badly wounded during the Third Battle of Ypres, at Broodseinde on 4 October.

McVilly was picked for special service in Mesopotamia and, in January 1918, set out for Basra in the Persian Gulf. He joined Dunsterforce in March 1918 and took part in the defence of Baku on the Caspian Sea in August. He was mentioned in dispatches on 21 February for special service in Mesopotamia. He was demobilised to Australia in March 1919.

== Post-war professional and rowing ==
Postbellum McVilly became a Captain on the reserve of officers of the Australian Military Forces. From 1919, he worked for the Repatriation Commission in Tasmania until, in 1929, he was appointed Inspector of Charities in Victoria. He became Chairman of the Victorian Hospitals and Charities Commission in 1948.

In 1921, McVilly was selected in the six seat of the Tasmania men's eight, which contested and placed second at the King's Cup at the 1921 Interstate Regatta. He then coached the Tasmanian King's Cup eights of 1925 (second place) and 1926 (victors).

He was the Honorary Auditor of the Derwent Rowing Club and the Tasmanian Rowing Association secretary. He was Australia's sole selector for the 1928 Amsterdam Olympics, picking Bobby Pearce who won gold in the single sculls.

== Personal and honours ==
McVilly married Kathleen Agnes Williams in Hobart on 28 August 1915. They had twin daughters. On his retirement in 1953, he moved to Cowes, Phillip Island, where he died 11 years later aged 75.

In 2015, Rowing Australia launched the McVilly-Pearce Pin, named after McVilly and Bobby Pearce, the first Australian rower to win Olympic gold. Every Australian senior level representative rower is to receive a specially numbered pin to commemorate the first time they were honoured to represent Australia at an international regatta.
