= Frank Gottschalt =

East German rower

Sport
- Sport: Rowing
- Club: SC Magdeburg
Medal record
Men's rowing
Representing East Germany
World Rowing Championships
Gold medal – first place	1977 Amsterdam	Eight

Frank Gottschalt is a rower who represented East Germany in the 1970s.

Gottschalt rowed for SC Magdeburg. At the 1973 World Rowing Junior Championships he became world champion in junior men's coxed pair teamed up with Bernd Lindner. At the 1974 World Rowing Junior Championships he became world champion in junior men's coxed four. At the 1975 East German championships, he came third in the coxed pair alongside Lindner and Georg Spohr as coxswain. At the 1976 East German championships, Gottschalt and Lindner became national champions, with Frank Berger as cox.

At the 1977 East German championships, Gottschalt and Lindner were part of the men's eight that took the national title. That team went to the 1977 World Rowing Championships where they became world champions in that boat class. At the 1978 East German championships, Gottschalt, Lindner, and Spohr became national vice-champions. In July 1979, they won a rowing regatta held at the Bosbaan in Amsterdam in the coxed pair.

He is erroneously listed as Gottschalk on the International Rowing Federation database.
