= Richard Garrard (rower) =

Australian rower

Personal information
- Born: 26 July 1943 (age 82)

Sport
- Country: Australia
- Sport: Rowing

Achievements and titles
- World finals: Amsterdam 1977
- National finals: 1964 - 1979
Medal record
Men's rowing
Representing Australia
World Rowing Championships
Bronze medal – third place	1977 Amsterdam	LM8+

Richard Garrard (born 26 July 1943) is an Australian former representative rower. He was a seven-time Australian national champion who rowed at the elite level for a fifteen-year period from 1964-79 initially in the open division and later as a lightweight. He competed in the men's coxless four event at the 1964 Summer Olympics and won a bronze medal at the 1977 World Rowing Championships.

== Club and state rowing ==
Raised in Melbourne, Gerrard was educated at and took up rowing at Xavier College, Melbourne in 1958. He joined the Mercantile Rowing Club in 1959 whilst still at school and won a novice pair in that year. He first won a Victorian state championship in 1962 aged nineteen with Bob Lachal in a coxed pair.

Victorian state selection first came for Gerrard in 1963, but as a reserve for the King's Cup eight and he did not race in a state crew till 1966 when he was in the bow seat of the Victorian eight which won the King's Cup that year. That would be his sole state appearance at the Interstate Regatta.

In Mercantile colours on several occasions and much later in Corio Bay Rowing Club colours Garrard contested national championships at the Australian Rowing Championships. He won six national titles, racing for Mercantile between 1964 and 1979 - twice in a coxless four (1964 and 1966); in a coxless pair in 1974; and three times in the lightweight eight (1975, 1976 and 1977).

== International representative rowing ==
Representative selection first came for Gerrard aged just 20 when he was picked to row in an all Mercantile coxless four at the 1964 Tokyo Olympics. They were eliminated in the repechage. In the 1966 at the second ever World Championships in Bled, Garrard raced again in an all Mercantile four who were eliminated in the repechage. In 1967 Garrard was selected at stroke of the Australian men's eight for a four race Trans-Tasman series against New Zealand. They lost all four of the match races.

After a long gap and a shift down to the lightweight division Garrard was back in national representative contention for the 1977 World Rowing Championships in Amsterdam. That eight rowed to a bronze medal.

== Rowing palmares ==
=== Finals at the Australian Rowing Championships ===
- 1964 – National Championship coxless four two seat - first
- 1966 – National Championships coxless four two seat - first
- 1972 – National Championships coxless pair stroke - first
- 1974 – National Championships coxless pair stroke - fifth
- 1975 – National Championships lightweight eight stroke - first
- 1976 – National Championships lightweight eight six seat - first
- 1977 – National Championships lightweight eight seven seat - first
- 1978 – National Championships lightweight eight seven seat - second
- 1979 – National Championships lightweight pair bow - second

=== Olympics and World Championships ===
- 1964 Summer Olympics – men's coxless four
- 1966 World Rowing Championships – men's coxless four
- 1977 World Rowing Championships – men's lightweight eight - bronze
