= Edward de Carvalho =

Australian rower

Personal information
- Born: 20 August 1989 (age 36)
- Education: Sydney Grammar School; Sydney University; UTS Sydney

Sport
- Sport: Rowing
- Club: UTS Haberfield Rowing Club

Achievements and titles
- National finals: Penrith Cup 2009-2015; Aust Champion LM4X 2009

Edward de Carvalho (born 20 August 1989) is an Australian filmmaker and a former representative and national champion lightweight rower.

== Club and state rowing ==
De Carvalho was educated at Sydney Grammar School where he took up rowing. He studied at the University of Sydney and completed a master's degree at the University of Technology Sydney by 2017. His senior club rowing was from both the Sydney University Boat Club and later the UTS Haberfield Rowing Club.

He was first selected to represent New South Wales in the men's lightweight four which contested the Penrith Cup at the Interstate Regatta within the 2009 Australian Rowing Championships. He raced for the Penrith Cup in New South Wales lightweight fours on seven consecutive occasions from 2009 to 2015.

De Carvalho's national championship title and representative success came in lightweight sculling crews. He won the Australian open lightweight men's quadruple scull title on his first attempt at the 2009 Australian Rowing Championships in a composite SUBC/QUBC crew. In 2010 in SUBC colours he won the U23 single sculls national title and the following year placed second in that same event.

In 2012 he contested the open lightweight men's single scull championship and only made the petite final but the next year he placed second in that title event. In 2014 now in the Australian national squad and coached by Lyall McCarthy, de Carvalho placed third in the national lightweight single sculls championship. Then in 2015 wearing the black and white of UTS Haberfield and coached by Tim McLaren he again placed third in that same event. It was his fourth and final tilt at that title.

== International representative rowing ==
De Carvalho was first selected to represent Australia in a men's U23 lightweight double scull at the 2010 World Rowing U23 Championships in Belarus. That crew finished eleventh. In 2011 again in a lightweight double scull he was selected to race at the U23 World Championships and placed nineteenth.

In 2013 he moved into the Australian senior squad. He raced in a lightweight double at the World Rowing Cup opener in Sydney and then was selected in Australia's lightweight quad to compete at the 2013 World Rowing Championships in South Korea. That crew placed fifth. In 2014 he only raced in Australian colours at the World Rowing Cup III in Lucerne but then in 2015 he was back in the lightweight quad for the 2015 World Rowing Championships. That crew won the B final and finished in overall seventh place. It was his last Australian representative appearance.

== Filmmaker ==
De Carvalho's master's degree was taken in media arts and production. He has worked as a film journalist, a creative producer and director. In 2021 he released a short film Silent Without The Sun which he directed and edited. The film looks at the interruption to rowers' Olympiad training cycle resulting from the delay of the 2020 Tokyo Olympics. The film was written by former Australian representative underage rower Tom Sacre and voiced by Olympian Annabelle McIntyre.
