= Rodney Stewart =

Australian rower

Personal information
- Nationality: Australian

Sport
- Country: Australia
- Sport: Rowing
- Club: 1964-72 Toowong Rowing Club; 1972-79 Mercantile Rowing Club; 1982-88 Thames Tradesmen's RC; 1988-08 Upper Thames RC
Medal record
Representing Australia
World Rowing Championships
Bronze medal – third place	1977 Amsterdam	LM8+

not to be confused with Rod Stewart.

Rodney Stewart is an Australian former lightweight rower. He was an Australian national champion and won a bronze medal at the 1977 World Rowing Championships. He is now the highest achieving athlete in the 79yr old category at Dart Totnes Rowing Club.

== Club and state rowing ==
Stewart was raised in Brisbane, Queensland and took up rowing as a coxswain in 1964 at the Toowong Rowing Club. He first made state selection for Queensland in 1970 in the men's senior eight contesting the King's Cup at the Interstate Regatta within the Australian Rowing Championships.

Stewart relocated to Melbourne and joined the Mercantile Rowing Club in 1972. In 1974 he shifted into the lightweight division. In Mercantile colours he contested and won the national lightweight eight title three time at the Australian Rowing Championships in 1974, 1975 and 1977.

Stewart moved to England in 1982 and returned to club heavyweight rowing in London initially from the Thames Tradesmen's Rowing Club from which club he competed annual at the Henley Royal Regatta until 1992. Later he rowed from the Upper Thames Rowing Club in master's/veteran's rowing up until 2008.

== International representative rowing ==
Stewart made his sole Australian representative appearance in 1977. At the 1977 World Rowing Championships in Amsterdam Stewart rowed in the four seat of the Australian lightweight eight which won a bronze medal.
