= Malcolm MacLean (rower) =

British rower

Personal information
- Nationality: British

Sport
- Sport: Rowing
- Club: University of London BC

Malcolm MacLean is a retired British rower who competed for Great Britain.

== Rowing career ==
MacLean was part of the lightweight coxless four that reached the final and finished fifth at the 1977 World Rowing Championships in Amsterdam.
