= Nicholas Wheatley =

Australian rower (born 1993)

Personal information
- Born: 12 March 1993 (age 33)
- Education: Shore School

Sport
- Country: Australia
- Sport: Rowing
- Club: Sydney University Boat Club

Achievements and titles
- National finals: King's Cup 2014-15
Medal record
Men's rowing
Representing Australia
World Championships (U23)
| Silver medal – second place | 2014 Varese | Coxless pair |
| Silver medal – second place | 2015 Plovdiv | Coxless pair |

Nicholas Wheatley (born 12 April 1993) is an Australian former representative rower. He was an Australian national champion, represented at the 2015 World Rowing Championships and was twice a medallist at U23 World Rowing Championships.

== Club and state rowing ==
Wheatey was raised in Sydney and educated at Shore School where he took up rowing. He rowed in that school's 2nd VIII in 2009 and stroked the first VIII in 2010 in both years to victory in those crews' races at the AAGPS Head of the River. His senior club rowing was from the Sydney University Boat Club.

In SUBC colours Wheatley contested a number of national titles at the Australian Rowing Championships. His gold medal championship success came in U23 category events - 2012 U23 men's eight (Wheatley at stroke); 2014 U23 men's coxless pair (with Jack Hargreaves); 2014 U23 men's coxless four (Wheatley at stroke); 2014 U23 men's eight; 2015 U23 men's eight (Wheatley in stroke seat)

Wheatley made his state representative debut for New South Wales at stroke in the 2011 youth eight which contested the Noel Wilkinson Trophy at the annual Interstate Regatta within the Australian Rowing Championships. In 2012 and 2013 Wheatley again rowed in the NSW youth eight when they brought home victories at the Interstate Regatta. In 2014 Wheatley moved into the New South Wales men's senior eight which contested the King's Cup at the Interstate Regatta. That crew was victorious. He rowed in another New South Wales King's Cup eights in 2015 to a silver medal.

== International representative rowing ==
Wheatley first represented for Australia in 2010 (his final year of school) when he was selected in a junior quad scull to race at the 2010 Junior World Rowing Championships in Racice. That crew placed eighth overall. The following year he was selected in the coxless four to race at the 2011 Junior World Rowing Championships at Eton Dorney. That crew placed thirteenth overall. At the World Rowing Cup I in Sydney in 2013 Wheatley raced in the Australian men's #1 eight which won a bronze medal. Later that year he competed in the eight at the 2013 World Rowing U23 Championships in Linz, Austria. The U23 eight finished in overall tenth place.

In 2014 he rowed in a coxless pair at the WRC III in Lucerne before contesting the World Rowing U23 Championships in Varese in the pair with Jack Hargreaves and taking a silver medal. He continued to partner with Hargreaves into 2015 and they raced at two World Rowing Cups in Europe before competing at the 2015 World Rowing U23 Championships in Plovdiv, where they won silver. The 2015 World Rowing Championships in Aiguebelette were an Olympic qualification regatta and made doubly important when Rowing Australia announced they would not attempt to make any last minute qualifications in 2016. Wheatley and Hargreaves took the pair to Aiguebelette where they finished in overall sixth place and qualified the boat (though not the rowers themselves) for Rio 2016.

For Wheatley the 2015 World Rowing Championships would be his first and only senior Australian representative rowing appearance. Ultimately Rowing Australia did decide to attempt to qualify a men's eight at the final Olympic qualification regatta in May 2016 in Lucerne. Wheatley was named in the initial 13 man squad vying for a seat in that eight but when he was left out of the final crew picked to travel Lucerne, he declared a close on his senior competitive rowing career. The chosen eight failed to qualify and Spencer Turrin and Alex Lloyd rowed Australia's pair in Rio.

== Post-rowing ==
Post rowing Wheatley commenced a career in the Real Estate industry focussing on residential and commercial developments.
