= Colin Smith (Australian rower) =

Australian rower

Personal information
- Years active: 1970–1978

Sport
- Sport: Rowing
- Club: Melbourne University Boat Club
Medal record
Men's rowing
Representing Australia
World Rowing Championships
Gold medal – first place	1974 Lucerne	Lwt men's four
Silver medal – second place	1977 Amsterdam	Lwt men's four
Bronze medal – third place	1975 Nottingham	Lwt men's four
Bronze medal – third place	1978 Copenhagen	Lwt men's eight

Colin Smith is an Australian former lightweight rower. He was an eight time national champion and rowed in the lightweight men's four which won Australia's first rowing World Championship title – a gold medal at the 1974 World Rowing Championships in Lucerne . During his career Smith won four medals at World Championship events.

== Club and state rowing ==
Smith's senior rowing was from the Melbourne University Boat Club. At the Australian Rowing Championships in 1975 and 1977 he won a national championship title in the lightweight four. In 1979, he won a national title in the lightweight eight.

Smith was first selected in South Australian state representative lightweight fours to contest the Penrith Cup at the Australian Rowing Championships from 1970 to 1973. After relocating to Victoria in 1974, he was selected in Victorian representative crews in 1974, 1975, 1977 and 1979. He was in crews that won the interstate championship on five occasions.

== National representative rowing ==
Smith was selected for Australian representative honours in a lightweight coxless four for the 1974 World Rowing Championships in Lucerne. That crew won Australia's first gold medal at a FISA World Rowing Championship.

The following year at Nottingham 1975 that same crew were selected to defend their title. They came third, taking the bronze medal and were the best performing Australian crew at those championships. They became the first Australian crew to win successive medals at any world championships or FISA championships.

Smith was also selected in Australia's lightweight four for Amsterdam 1977 and in the lightweight eight at Copenhagen 1978 taking silver and bronze, respectively. He was a selector of the national women's crews for the 1978 World Championships. He was picked for the men's lightweight eight who went to the 1979 World Rowing Championships but withdrew for business reasons.

== Coach and administrator ==
Smith was the coach of Victoria's King's Cup eight in 1981 and coach of Melbourne University coxless fours that placed first and second at the 1981 National Championships.

He was a board member of Rowing Australia from 1998 to 2009 and President from 2009 to 2015. He was Chairman of the High Performance Commission from 2001 to 2009 and co-chairman of the National Rowing Centre of Excellence from 2009 to 2015.
