= Phillip Gardiner =

Australian rower

Personal information
- Nationality: Australian
- Born: 1952 (age 73–74)

Sport
- Country: Australia
- Sport: Rowing
- Club: Glebe Rowing Club; Melb University Boat Club

Achievements and titles
- National finals: Penrith Cup 1979-1992
Medal record
Representing Australia
World Rowing Championships
Bronze medal – third place	1977 Amsterdam	LM8+
Bronze medal – third place	1978 Copenhagen	LM8+

Phillip Gardiner (born 1952) is an Australian former representative lightweight rower. He was an eight-time Australian national champion and won two bronze medals at World Rowing Championships. He made ten appearances for Australia at World Rowing Championships over the seventeen-year period from 1977 to 1994.

== Club and state rowing ==
Gardiner was raised in Sydney and took up rowing as a coxswain in 1961 at the Glebe Rowing Club. He coxed a Glebe men's junior four at the 1970 Australian Rowing Championships.

Gardiner relocated to Melbourne and joined the Melbourne University Boat Club in 1977 in an effort to make the Australian lightweight eight. In Melbourne Uni colours he contested and won the national lightweight eight title twice at the Australian Rowing Championships in 1981 and 1985.

In 1979 he first made state selection for Victoria in the men's lightweight four which contested and won the Penrith Cup at the Interstate Regatta within the Australian Rowing Championships. He raced in further Penrith Cup fours for Victoria in 1980, 1984, 1985, 1986, 1987, 1988, 1990 and 1992 always in the bow seat. He saw victories in those crews in 1979, 1984, 1985, 1986, 1988 and 1990.

== International representative rowing ==
Gardiner made his Australian representative debut at the 1977 World Rowing Championships in Amsterdam in the Australian lightweight eight which won a bronze medal. The following year at the 1978 World Rowing Championships in Copenhagen he was again in the lightweight eight for another bronze.

He made the Australian men's lightweight eight on four further occasions and raced in that boat at Bled 1979, Montreal 1984, Hazewinkel 1985 and Lake Barrington 1990. He contested the 1981 World Rowing Championships in a lightweight double scull, the 1992 World Rowing Championships in Australia's lightweight four and the 1994 World Rowing Championships in a lightweight pair.

== Rowing palmares ==
- 1981 National Championships Men's Lightweight Eight bow - First
- 1985 National Championships Men's Lightweight Four bow – First
- 1977 – Interstate Men's Lightweight Four Championship emergency
- 1979 – Interstate Men's Lightweight Four Championship bow - First
- 1980 – Interstate Men's Lightweight Four Championship bow - Third
- 1983 – Interstate Men's Lightweight Four Championship emergency
- 1984 – Interstate Men's Lightweight Four Championship bow - First
- 1985 – Interstate Men's Lightweight Four Championship bow – First
- 1986 – Interstate Men's Lightweight Four Championship bow - First
- 1987 – Interstate Men's Lightweight Four Championship bow - Second
- 1988 – Interstate Men's Lightweight Four Championship bow - First
- 1990 – Interstate Men's Lightweight Four Championship bow - First
- 1992 – Interstate Men's Lightweight Four Championship bow - Second
- 1977 World Rowing Championships – Men's Lightweight Eight bow – Bronze
- 1978 World Rowing Championships – Men's Lightweight Eight three seat – Bronze
- 1979 World Rowing Championships – Men's Lightweight Eight bow – Sixth
- 1980 World Rowing Championships – Men's Lightweight Four reserve
- 1981 World Rowing Championships – Men's Lightweight Double Scull bow – Eleventh
- 1984 World Rowing Championships – Men's Lightweight Eight bow – Tenth
- 1985 World Rowing Championships – Men's Lightweight Eight two seat – Fifth
- 1990 World Rowing Championships – Men's Lightweight Eight bow – Fifth
- 1992 World Rowing Championships – Men's Lightweight Four bow – Eighth
- 1994 World Rowing Championships – Men's Lightweight Pair bow - Eighth
