= John Hawkins (rower) =

Australian rower

Sport
- Country: Australia
- Sport: Rowing
- Club: South Melbourne RC; Surfers Paradise RC; Mercantile Rowing Club

Achievements and titles
- National finals: Penrith Cup 1974 & 1976
Medal record
Men's rowing
Representing Australia
World Rowing Championships
Bronze medal – third place	1977 Amsterdam	LM8+

John Hawkins is an Australian former representative rower. He was a three time Australian national champion and won a bronze medal at the 1977 World Rowing Championships.

== Club and state rowing ==
Hawkins commenced his senior club rowing in 1968 with the South Melbourne Rowing club and rowed there till 1972. From 1972 to 1975, he was living in Queensland and rowed from the Surfers Paradise Rowing Club. In 1975, he relocated back to Melbourne and joined the Mercantile Rowing Club from where he had most of his representative success.

Hawkins first rowed at the Australian Interstate Regatta in 1974 in a Queensland lightweight four contesting the Penrith Cup. That crew finished third. In 1976, he contested and won the Penrith Cup in the Victorian lightweight four.

In Mercantile colours Hawkins contested national titles at the Australian Rowing Championships. He won the national lightweight four title in 1976 and was at stroke in a Mercantile crew which won national lightweight eight title in 1977.

== International representative rowing ==
Hawkins made his Australian representative debut in 1977 in the men's lightweight eight at the 1977 World Rowing Championships in Amsterdam. The Australian eight rowed to a bronze medal. He rowed again in the Australian lightweight eight at the 1979 World Rowing Championships where that crew placed sixth.
