= David England (rower) =

Australian rower (born 1956)

Personal information
- Nationality: Australian
- Born: 25 June 1956 (age 70)

Sport
- Country: Australia
- Sport: Rowing
- Club: Melb University Boat Club
Medal record
Representing Australia
World Rowing Championships
Bronze medal – third place	1977 Amsterdam	LM8+

David England (born 25 June 1956) is an Australian coxswain, coach and rowing administrator. He was an Australian national champion, an Olympian and won a bronze medal at the 1977 World Rowing Championships.

== Club and state rowing ==
England senior club rowing was from the Melbourne University Boat Club. In Melbourne Uni colours he contested and won the national lightweight eight title twice at the Australian Rowing Championships in 1972 and 1979.

In 1974, he first made state selection for Victoria in the men's lightweight four which contested and won the Penrith Cup at the Interstate Regatta within the Australian Rowing Championships. He raced in further victorious Penrith Cup fours for Victoria in 1978 and 1979. He coxed the Victorian men's eight contesting the King's Cup at Interstate Regattas in 1975, 1976, and 1980, winning the King's Cup on that last attempt.

At the conclusion of his Australian competitive career England's professional career took him overseas. From 1984 to 93 he was an active member of the Rowing Club within Royal Hong Kong Yacht Club and from 1993 to 2001 a competitor at the Walton Rowing Club in England.

== International representative rowing ==
England made his Australian representative debut at the 1977 World Rowing Championships in Amsterdam in the Australian lightweight eight which won a bronze medal. Then at the 1979 World Rowing Championships in Bled he was again in the lightweight eight when the finished in sixth place.

England was in the stern of the Australian heavyweight eight selected to compete at the 1980 Moscow Olympics. That crew finished in overall fifth place.

== Coaching and rowing administration ==
England was coaching before his competitive coxing career had ended. He coached a Victorian state representative women's four to victory in the Interstate Regatta in 1978. He coached Victorian lightweight men's fours to victory in 1979 and 1984. In 1978, he co-coached a Victorian composite women's eight to a national championship victory and he repeated that feat in 2011 with a MUBC women's eight.

He was the Finance Director of Rowing Australia from 2007 to 2009 and then was a board member of Rowing Australian for a period from 2010.
