= Phillip Ainsworth =

Australian former rower

Personal information
- Nationality: Australian

Sport
- Country: Australia
- Sport: Rowing
- Club: Mercantile Rowing Club
Medal record
Representing Australia
World Championships
Bronze medal – third place	1977 Amsterdam	LM8+

Phillip Ainsworth is an Australian former lightweight rower. He was an Australian national champion and won a bronze medal at the 1977 World Rowing Championships.

== Club and state rowing ==
Ainsworth was educated at Scotch College, Melbourne where he took up rowing in 1966. He rowed in the Scotch second VIII in his final school year of 1969. He continued rowing at Monash University in 1970 and then joined Mercantile Rowing Club in Melbourne in 1972.

In 1977 Ainsworth rowed in the Mercantile lightweight eight which won the national championship title at the Australian Rowing Championships.

== International representative rowing ==
Ainsworth made his Australian representative debut at the 1977 World Rowing Championships in Amsterdam in the Australian men's lightweight eight. That eight won a bronze medal with Ainsworth in the three seat.

== Coaching career ==
Ainsworth was seriously injured in a car accident at the 1978 Australian Rowing Championships. He was secretary of Mercantile Rowing Club in 1978-9 and from 1982 to 1988.

He coached Australian junior coxed fours to the Junior World Rowing Championships - to bronze in 1984; to fifth place in 1985; to twelfth place in 1986 and to sixth place in 1987. He coached Australian U23 fours to the World Rowing U23 Championships - to fourth place in 1984 and sixth place in 1987. He coached Mercantile junior fours to victory at the Australian Rowing Championships in 1984, 1985, 1986 and 1987.
