= Ian Porter (rower) =

Australian former lightweight rower

Personal information
- Nationality: Australian
- Education: Scotch College

Sport
- Country: Australia
- Sport: Rowing
- Club: Mercantile Rowing Club
Medal record
Representing Australia
World Rowing Championships
Bronze medal – third place	1977 Amsterdam	LM8+
Bronze medal – third place	1978 Copenhagen	LM8+

Ian Porter is an Australian former lightweight rower. He was a four-time Australian national champion and won two bronze medals at World Rowing Championships.

== Club and state rowing ==
Porter was educated at Scotch College where he took up rowing. In 1974 he stroked that school's first VIII. Porter joined Melbourne's Mercantile Rowing Club in 1975 from where he did his senior club rowing initially in maiden and junior heavyweight crews but then from 1976 as a lightweight.

Porter made the 1976 Victorian men's lightweight four which contested and won the Penrith Cup at the Interstate Regatta within the Australian Rowing Championships.

In Mercantile colours he raced in a junior eight at the 1975 Australian Rowing Championships finishing second. In 1976 he won the national lightweight four championship title and in 1977 the national lightweight eight title. He won another national lightweight eight title at the Australian Rowing Championships in 1978.

== International representative rowing ==
Porter made his Australian representative debut in 1973 while still at school. He rowed in the three seat of the Australian junior eight who contested the 1973 World Junior Rowing Championships in Nottingham.

At the 1977 World Rowing Championships in Amsterdam Porter rowed in the five seat of the Australian lightweight eight which won a bronze medal. The following year at the 1978 World Rowing Championships in Copenhagen he was again in the lightweight eight for another bronze.
