= 1977 World Rowing Championships =

International rowing event

- Venue: Bosbaan
- Location: Amsterdam, Netherlands
- Dates: 19–28 August 1977
- Competitors: 556 from 28 nations

The 1977 World Rowing Championships was the 6th World Rowing Championships. The championships were held from 19 to 28 August 1977 on the Bosbaan rowing lake in Amsterdam, Netherlands.

== Medal summary ==
About 556 rowers from 28 countries competed at the event. Medallists at the 1977 World Rowing Championships were:

=== Men's events ===
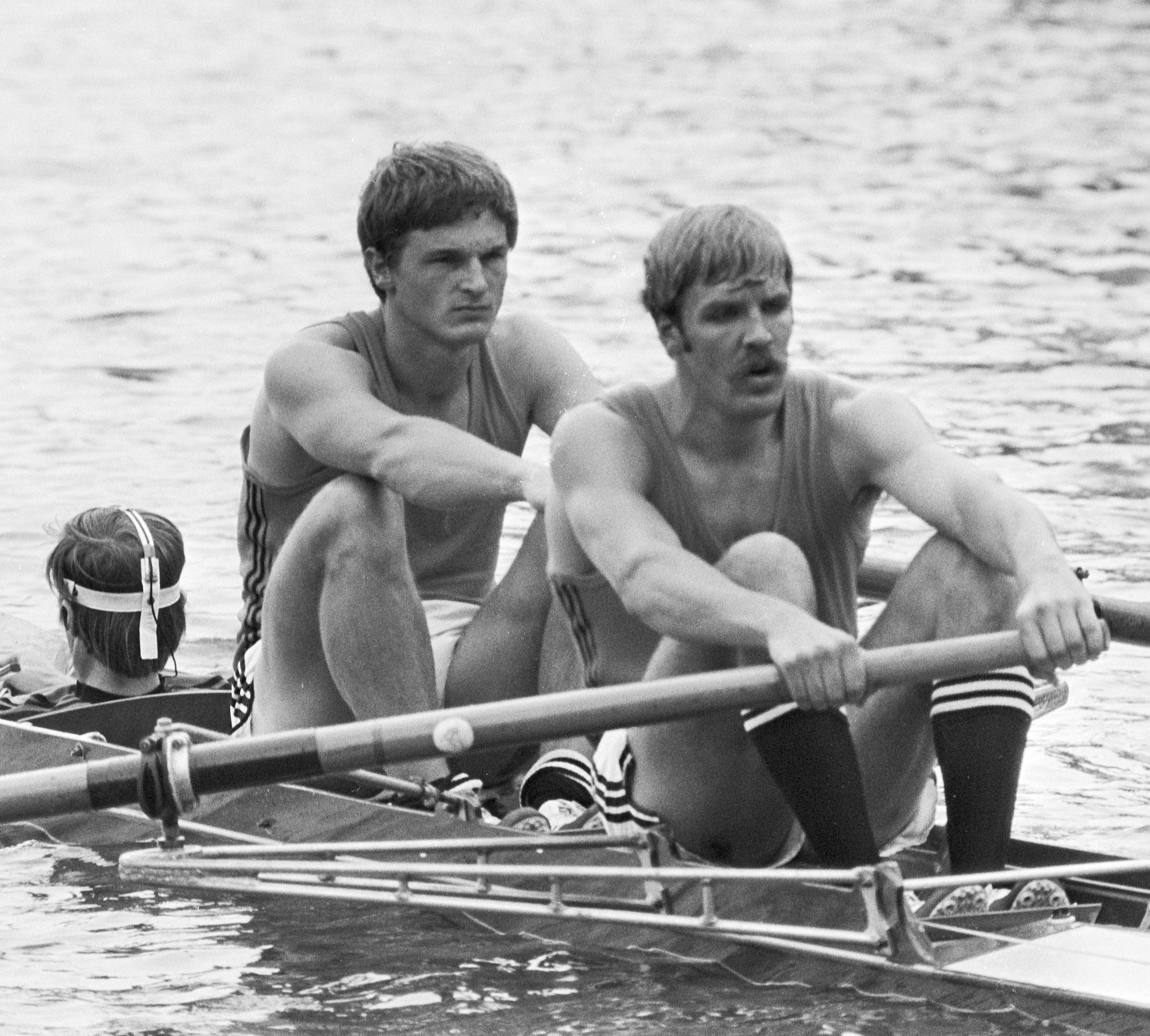
The Dutch Evert Kroes and Peter van de Pas with cox Paul De Haan came fourth in the coxed pair

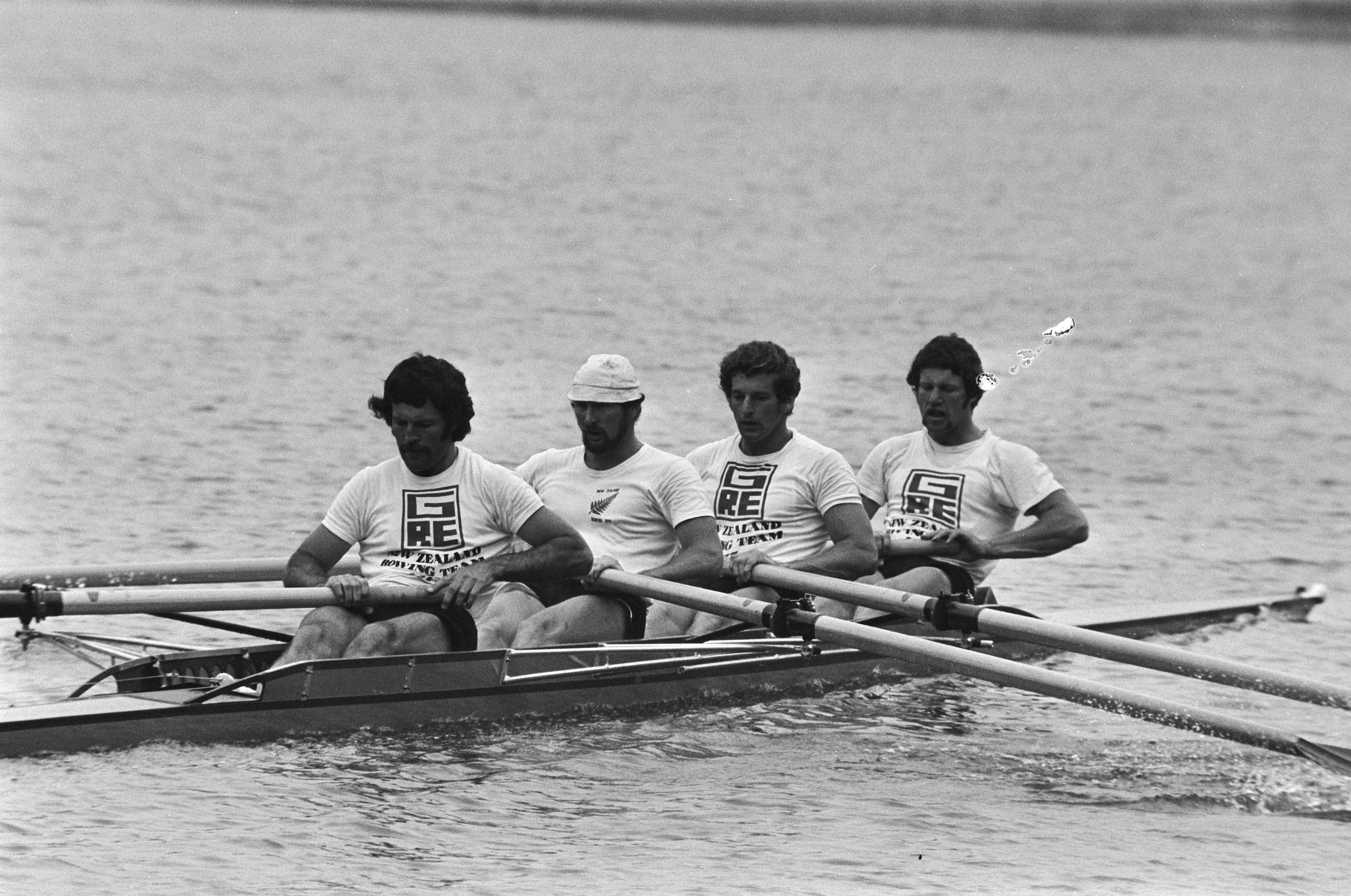
The New Zealand coxless four with Dave Rodger, Des Lock, Ivan Sutherland, and David Lindstrom won silver

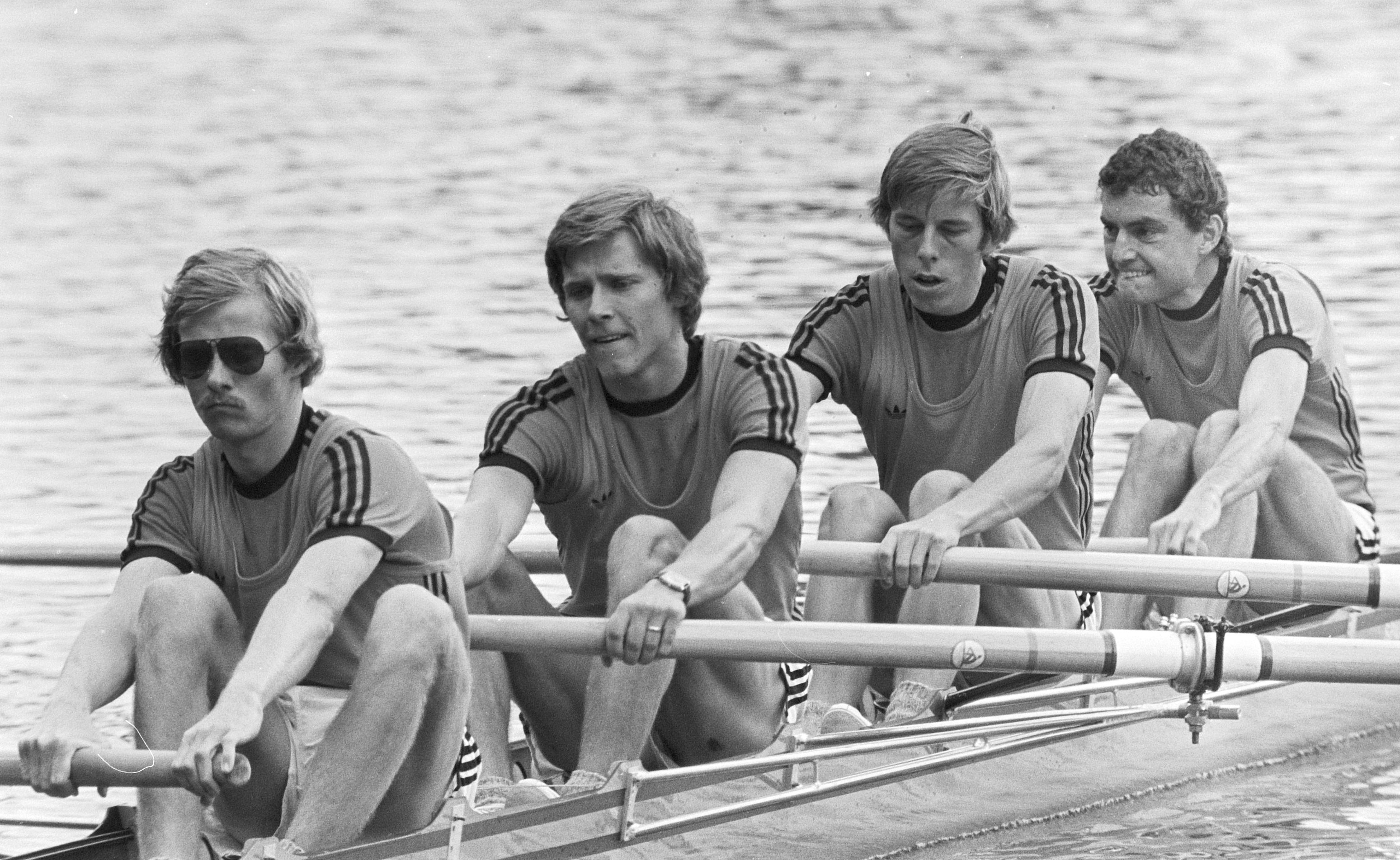
The Dutch lightweight coxless four with Ge Schous, Hans Pieterman, Hans Povel, and Hans Lycklama won bronze

Event	Gold		Silver		Bronze	
Event	Country & rowers	Time	Country & rowers	Time	Country & rowers	Time
M1x	East Germany; Joachim Dreifke	7:12.22	Finland; Pertti Karppinen	7:15.53	Soviet Union; Mykola Dovhan	7:20.23
M2x	Great Britain; Chris Baillieu; Michael Hart	6:42.83	East Germany; Rüdiger Reiche; Uli Schmied	6:44.70	Soviet Union; Evgeni Shorniy; Gennadi Korshikov	6:45.93
M4x	East Germany; Frank Dundr; Martin Winter; Karl-Heinz Bußert; Wolfgang Güldenpfennig	5:57.44	Czechoslovakia; Karel Černý; Filip Koudela; Zdeněk Pecka; Václav Vochoska	6:01.37	Bulgaria; Khristo Zhelev; Lyubomir Petrov; Bogdan Dobrev; Eftim Stoyanov	6:04.43
M2-	Soviet Union; Aleksandr Kulagin; Vitaliy Eliseyev	7:06.19	Great Britain; Jim Clark; John Roberts	7:09.63	East Germany; Bernd Krauß; Ortwin Rodewald	7:13.36
M4-	East Germany; Wolfgang Mager; Stefan Semmler; Andreas Decker; Siegfried Brietzke	6:16.73	New Zealand; Dave Rodger; Des Lock; Ivan Sutherland; David Lindstrom	6:19.14	Czechoslovakia; Pavel Konvička; Josef Neštický; Vlastimil Beránek; Lubomír Zapletal	6:21.10
M2+	Bulgaria; Dimitar Yanakiev; Todor Mrankov; Stefan Stoykov (cox)	7:21.72	East Germany; Friedrich-Wilhelm Ulrich; Harald Jährling; Georg Spohr (cox)	7:24.60	Czechoslovakia; Karel Mejta; Karel Neffe; Jiří Pták (cox)	7:28.72
M4+	East Germany; Dieter Wendisch; Walter Dießner; Gottfried Döhn; Ullrich Dießner; Andreas Gregor (cox)	6:39.16	West Germany; Gabriel Konertz; Wolfram Thiem; Frank Schütze; Klaus Meyer; Helmut Sassenbach (cox)	6:41.76	Bulgaria; Tsvetan Petkov; Rumen Khristov; Nasko Markov; Ivan Botev; Nenko Dobrev (cox)	6:49.63
M8+	East Germany; Gerd Sredzki; Bernd Lindner; Frank Gottschalt; Ulrich Kons; Hans-Joachim Lück; Bernd Frieberg; Ulrich Karnatz; Wolfgang Gunkel; Frank Jahncke (cox)	5:45.36	Soviet Union; Raul Arnemann; Mikhail Kuznetsov; Valeriy Dolinin; Alexander Beljaev; Anatoly Ivanov; Vasily Potapov; Aleksandr Klepikov; Vladimir Eshinov; Aleksandr Lukyanov (cox)	5:50.71	West Germany; Fritz Schuster; Diethelm Maxrath; Thomas Scholl; Klaus Roloff; Gerhard Reinert; Winfried Ringwald; Volker Sauer; Wolf-Dieter Oschlies; Hartmut Wenzel (cox)	5:52.83
Lightweight events
LM1x	Switzerland; Reto Wyss	7:18.58	Denmark; Morten Espersen	7:18.59	United States; Lawrence Klecatsky	7:19.28
LM4-	France; André Picard; Michel Picard; André Coupat; Francis Pelegri	6:30.00	Australia; Colin Smith; Peter Antonie; Simon Gillett; Geoffrey Rees	6:31.44	Netherlands; Hans Lycklama; Hans Povel; Hans Pieterman; Ge Schous	6:34.11
LM8+	Great Britain; Nigel Read; Paul Stuart-Bennett; Christopher George; Stephen Simpole; Colin Cusack; Duncan Innes; Daniel Topolski; Christopher Drury; Patrick Sweeney (cox)	5:57.37	Spain; Antonio Elizalde; Javier Puertas Cabezudo; Dionisio Redondo; Jose Mas; Jose Marti; Rafael Gomez; Fernando Climent; José Rojí; Carmelo Lafuente (cox)	5:57.44	Australia; Phillip Gardiner; Malcolm Robertson; Phillip Ainsworth; Rodney Stewart; Ian Porter; Alan de Belin; Richard Garrard; John Hawkins; David England (cox)	6:00.51

=== Women's events ===
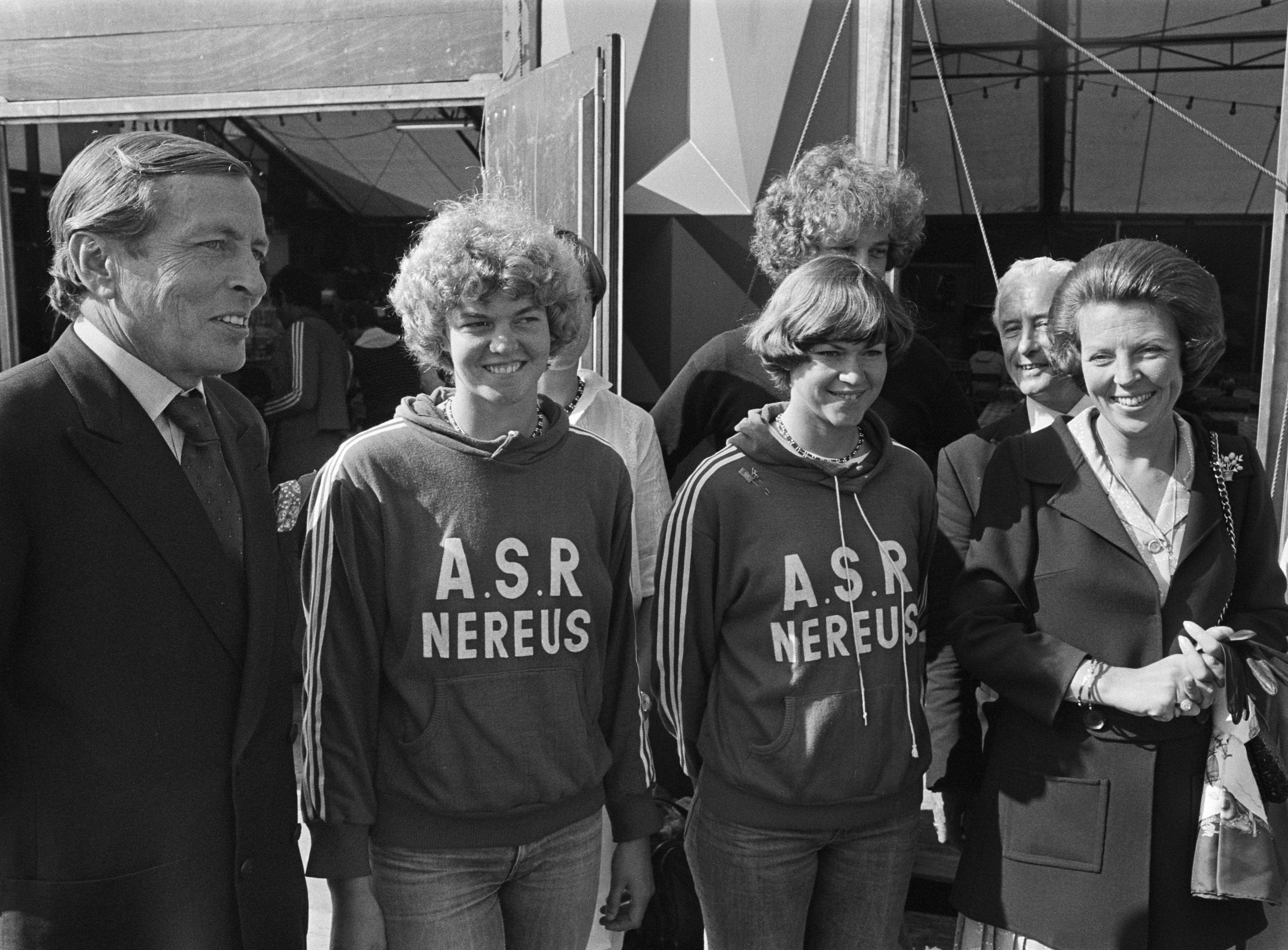
Dutch coxless pair (silver medal) Joke Dierdorp (second from left) and Karin Abma framed by Prince Claus and Princess Beatrix

In the coxed four, the Bulgarian team was one of the favourites. After two false starts in the final they were disqualified.

Event	Gold		Silver		Bronze	
Event	Country & rowers	Time	Country & rowers	Time	Country & rowers	Time
W1x	East Germany; Christine Scheiblich	3:34.31	Bulgaria; Iskra Velinova	3:36.31	Hungary; Mariann Ambrus	3:37.27
W2x	East Germany; Anke Borchmann; Roswietha Zobelt	3:16.83	Bulgaria; Svetla Otsetova; Zdravka Yordanova	3:20.04	United States; Elizabeth Hills-O'Leary; Lisa Hansen	3:22.48
W4x+	East Germany; Sybille Tietze; Viola Kowalschek; Petra Boesler; Sabine Gust; Elke Rost (cox)	3:10.11	Romania; Maria Mosneagu; Felicia Afrăsiloaie; Aneta Marin; Veronica Juganaru; Elena Giurcă (cox)	3:12.55	Bulgaria; Rositsa Spasova; Anka Bakova; Rumelyana Boncheva; Penka Gotcheva; Stanka Georgieva (cox)	3:16.21
W2-	East Germany; Sabine Dähne; Angelika Noack	3:27.89	Netherlands; Karin Abma; Joke Dierdorp	3:30.54	Canada; Elizabeth Craig; Susan Antoft	3:32.89
W4+	East Germany; Marion Rohs; Ilona Richter; Katja Rothe; Bärbel Bendiks; Marina Wilke (cox)	3:20.59	Soviet Union; Raisa Tsarkova; Valentina Alekseeva; Sofia Shurkalova; Nina Abramova; Nina Frolova (cox)	3:23.14	Romania; Florica Zamfir; Georgeta Militaru-Mașca; Florica Silaghi; Elena Avram; Elena Giurcă (cox)	3:25.29
W8+	East Germany; Cornelia Klier; Ute Steindorf; Gabriele Lohs; Kersten Neisser; Marita Sandig; Andrea Kurth; Bianka Schwede; Karin Metze; Sabine Heß (cox)	3:00.23	Soviet Union; Olga Pivovarova; Nina Antoniuk; Tatyana Bunjak; Nadezhda Dergatchenko; Nataliya Horodilova; Nina Umanets; Maria Paziun; Olga Krishevich; Raisa Kirilova (cox)	3:02.37	Canada; Joy Fera; Christine Neuland; Jacklin Kelly; Nancy Higgins; Dolores Young; Tricia Smith; Mazina Delure; Carol Eastmore; Ilona Smith (cox)	3:05.72

=== Event codes ===
	single sculls	double sculls	quadruple sculls	quad sculls (coxed)	pair (coxless)	four (coxless)	coxed pair	coxed four	eight (coxed)
Men's	M1x	M2x	M4x		M2-	M4-	M2+	M4+	M8+
Lightweight men's	LM1x					LM4-			LM8+
Women's	W1x	W2x		W4x+	W2-			W4+	W8+

== Finals ==
Event	1st	2nd	3rd	4th	5th	6th
M1x	East Germany	Finland	Soviet Union	Great Britain	Ireland	Italy
M2x	Great Britain	East Germany	Soviet Union	West Germany	United States	Czechoslovakia
M4x	East Germany	Czechoslovakia	Bulgaria	Spain	France	West Germany
M2-	Soviet Union	Great Britain	East Germany	Yugoslavia	Bulgaria	United States
M4-	East Germany	New Zealand	Czechoslovakia	Netherlands	Canada	Bulgaria
M2+	Bulgaria	East Germany	Czechoslovakia	Netherlands	Romania	Poland
M4+	East Germany	West Germany	Bulgaria	Soviet Union	Czechoslovakia	Yugoslavia
M8+	East Germany	Soviet Union	West Germany	Czechoslovakia	Great Britain	United States
LM1x	Switzerland	Denmark	United States	Australia	Canada	Austria
LM4-	France	Australia	Netherlands	Switzerland	Great Britain	West Germany
LM8+	Great Britain	Spain	Australia	Netherlands	Denmark	Canada
W1x	East Germany	Bulgaria	Hungary	Soviet Union	United States	France
W2x	East Germany	Bulgaria	United States	Canada	Great Britain	Netherlands
W4x+	East Germany	Romania	Bulgaria	West Germany	Soviet Union	Hungary
W2-	East Germany	Netherlands	Canada	Romania	Bulgaria	United States
W4+	East Germany	Soviet Union	Romania	Canada	Australia	Bulgaria (disqualified)
W8+	East Germany	Soviet Union	Canada	Romania	Bulgaria	Netherlands

== Great Britain ==
Event		Notes
M1x	Tim Crooks	4th in A final
M2x	Chris Baillieu & Michael Hart	gold medal in A final
M4x	Ivor Lloyd, Charles Wiggin, Graeme Mulcahy, Malcolm Carmichael	1st in B final
M2-	Jim Clark & John Roberts	silver medal in A final
M4-	Derek Bond, Ian McNuff, John Beattie, Martin Cross	4th in B final
M2+	James MacLeod, Neil Christie, David Webb	4th in B final
M4+	N/A	no entry
M8+	Lenny Robertson, Allan Whitwell, Henry Clay, William Woodward-Fisher, Phil Gregory, Gordon Rankine, Robert Milligan, Colin Seymour, Robert Lee (cox)	5th in A final
LM1x	Peter Zeun	4th in B final
L4-	John Hanna, Ian Hyslop, Malcolm MacLean, Jeremy Edwards	5th in A final
L8	Nigel Read, Paul Stuart-Bennett, Christopher George, Stephen Simpole, Colin Cusack; Duncan Innes, Daniel Topolski, Christopher Drury, Patrick Sweeney (cox)	gold medal in A final
W1x	N/A	no entry
W2x	Pauline Hart & Astrid Ayling	5th in A final (1st GB women's crew to reach a World final)
W4x	Rosie Clugston, Sue Handscomb, Stephanie Price, Beverly Jones, Liz Norman (cox)	4th in B final
W2-	Lin Clark & Beryl Mitchell	4th in B final
W4+	Yvonne Earl, Maggie Phillips, Nicola Boyes, Christine Grimes, Pauline Wright (cox)	4th in B final
W8+	N/A	no entry
