= Malcolm Robertson (rower) =

Australian former lightweight rower

Personal information
- Nickname: Magic
- Nationality: Australian
- Education: Geelong College

Sport
- Country: Australia
- Sport: Rowing
- Club: Mercantile Rowing Club
Medal record
Representing Australia
World Rowing Championships
Bronze medal – third place	1977 Amsterdam	LM8+
Bronze medal – third place	1978 Copenhagen	LM8+

Malcolm Robertson is an Australian former lightweight rower. He was an Australian national champion and won two bronze medals at World Rowing Championships.

== Club and state rowing ==
Robertson was educated at Geelong College where he took up rowing. In 1975 in that school's first VIII he won the national schoolboy eight title at the Australian Rowing Championships. Robertson joined Melbourne's Mercantile Rowing Club in 1976 from where he did his senior club rowing.

Victorian state representation first came for Robertson in the 1975 youth eight which contested and won the Noel Wilkinson Trophy at the Interstate Regatta within the Australian Rowing Championships.

Robertson made the 1987 Victorian men's lightweight four competing for the Penrith Cup at the Interstate Regatta. He contested further Penrith Cups for Victoria in 1988 and 1990, achieving victories in both years.

In Mercantile colours he raced in a junior eight at the 1976 Australian Rowing Championships finishing second. In 1977 he won a national championship in a men's lightweight eight. After a year off in 1979, he returned to racing in 1980 but struggled to make weight and was ill. He returned to a successful rowing career in 1987. He won two national titles at the Australian Rowing Championships in 1989 - the men’s lightweight four and the men’s lightweight pair.

== International representative rowing ==
Robertson made his Australian representative debut at the 1977 World Rowing Championships in Amsterdam in the Australian lightweight eight which won a bronze medal. The following year at the 1978 World Rowing Championships in Copenhagen he was again in the lightweight eight for another bronze.

Robertson's representative career finished in the Australian lightweight eight at the 1990 World Rowing Championships where they rowed to a fifth placing.
