= Hans Povel =

Dutch rower

Sport
- Sport: Rowing
Medal record
Representing the Netherlands
World Rowing Championships
Bronze medal – third place	1977 Amsterdam	LM4-
Silver medal – second place	1978 Copenhagen	LM8+
Bronze medal – third place	1979 Bled	LM8+

Hans Povel (born c. 1954) is a retired Dutch rower who won three medals at the World Lightweight Rowing Championships in 1977–1979 in the eight and coxless four.
