= Shirley Graham (rower) =

Australian rower

Personal information
- Nationality: Australian

Sport
- Sport: Rowing
- Club: Tweed Heads Rowing Club

Achievements and titles
- National finals: Victoria Cup 1968-70; ULVA Trophy 1969-60; Nell Slatter Trophy 1970-76

Shirley Graham is an Australian pioneer representative rower and was Australia's first international representative oarswoman. A five-time Australian national champion, accomplished as both a light-weight sculler and light-weight sweep-oarswoman, two of her Australian championship titles and both her international representative appearances were achieved in the open-weight division. She represented at the 1972 European Rowing Championships and the 1974 World Rowing Championships.

== Club and state rowing ==
Graham's senior rowing was from the Tweed Heads Rowing Club in Queensland. She was coached by her husband Roy "Chic" Graham.

She began contesting national titles at Australian Rowing Championships from 1968. She won a silver medal in the junior scull in 1969, then took gold and national championship titles in the lightweight scull in 1970, 1973 and 1974. She finished third in that event in 1971.

Graham was first honoured with Queensland state selection in 1968 when she was picked to contest the Victoria Cup for lightweight women's fours at the annual Interstate Regatta within the Australian Rowing Championships. She made two further Victoria Cup appearances for Queensland in 1969 and 1970, finishing third on all three occasions. In 1969 and 1970 she was also picked for Queensland to row in the women's heavyweight four contesting the ULVA Trophy at the Interstate Regatta. Both those crews finished third. From 1970 to 1974, then again in 1976 she was the Queensland representative entrant to contest the Nell Slatter Trophy, the Interstate Championship in the women's open scull. She had podium finishes in all of those years and won the gold in 1973 and 1974. In 1970 therefore, Queensland selectors picked Shirley Graham to contest all three state women's races at the Interstate Regatta.

== Trailblazing international representative ==
There were no Olympic rowing events for women until 1976 and Australia sent no female Olympic crews until 1980. The first Women's World Championships were in 1974 in Lucerne, with no women's lightweight World Championship events till 1984. To test herself at the world class Shirley Graham needed to fund her own travel to Europe, to row with borrowed equipment when she got there and to race above her weight. She travelled to the 1972 Women's European Championships in East Germany and competed as the approved Australian representative entrant in the women's heavyweight scull where she finished in overall twelfth place.

As the premier Australian sculler throughout 1973 and 1974 Graham was chosen to race the single scull at the 1974 World Rowing Championships in Lucerne, the first World Championships to contest women's events. She finished last in her heat, then failed to qualify through the repechage to a spot on either A or B final.
