= Hans Pieterman =

Dutch rower

Sport
- Sport: Rowing
Medal record
Representing the Netherlands
World Rowing Championships
Silver medal – second place	1974 Lucerne	Lwt coxless four
Bronze medal – third place	1977 Amsterdam	Lwt coxless four
Bronze medal – third place	1979 Bled	Lwt eight

Hans Pieterman is a retired Dutch rower who won three medals at the World Lightweight Rowing Championships from 1974 to 1979 in the eight and coxless four.
