= Rowing at the 1976 Summer Olympics – Men's coxless pair =

Men's coxless pair at the Games of the XXI Olympiad
- Date: 18–25 July 1976
- Competitors: 30 from 15 nations

Medalists
1st place, gold medalist(s)		Bernd Landvoigt; Jörg Landvoigt	East Germany
2nd place, silver medalist(s)		Calvin Coffey; Mike Staines	United States
3rd place, bronze medalist(s)		Peter van Roye; Thomas Strauß	West Germany

The men's coxless pair competition at the 1976 Summer Olympics took place at Notre Dame Island Olympic Basin, Canada.

== Competition format ==
The competition consisted of three main rounds (heats, semifinals, and finals) as well as a repechage after the heats.

- The 15 boats were divided into three heats for the first round, with 5 boats in each heat. The top 3 boats in each heat advanced directly to the semifinals (9 boats total). The remaining 6 boats competed in a single-heat repechage.
- The top 3 boats in the repechage advanced to the semifinals; the bottom 3 boats were eliminated.
- The semifinals consisted of two heats of 6 boats each. The top 3 boats in each semifinal advanced to the "A" final (1st through 6th place). The 4th through 6th place boats were placed in the "B" final (7th through 12th place).

All races were over a 2000 metre course.

== Results ==
=== Heats ===
==== Heat 1 ====
Rank	Rowers	Nation	Time	Notes
1	Bernd Landvoigt; Jörg Landvoigt	East Germany	6:49.19	Q
2	Calvin Coffey; Mike Staines	United States	6:52.36	Q
3	Tiit Helmja; Gennadi Kinko	Soviet Union	6:55.57	Q
4	Willem Boeschoten; Jan van der Horst	Netherlands	6:59.99	R
5	Mogens Rasmussen; Kim Rørbæk	Denmark	7:46.75	R

==== Heat 2 ====
Rank	Rowers	Nation	Time	Notes
1	Vojtěch Caska; Miroslav Knapek	Czechoslovakia	6:56.50	Q
2	Alfons Ślusarski; Zbigniew Ślusarski	Poland	6:58.98	Q
3	Leo Ahonen; Kari Hanska	Finland	7:02.62	Q
4	Brian Love; Mike Neary	Canada	7:05.10	R
5	Ian Luxford; Chris Shinners	Australia	7:07.21	R

==== Heat 3 ====
Rank	Rowers	Nation	Time	Notes
1	Zlatko Celent; Duško Mrduljaš	Yugoslavia	6:56.06	Q
2	Georgi Georgiev; Valentin Stoev	Bulgaria	6:58.96	Q
3	Peter van Roye; Thomas Strauß	West Germany	7:01.52	Q
4	Henry Clay; David Sturge	Great Britain	7:04.83	R
5	Raúl Bagattini; Guilherme Campos	Brazil	8:00.64	R

=== Repechage ===
Rank	Rowers	Nation	Time	Notes
1	Willem Boeschoten; Jan van der Horst	Netherlands	6:55.37	Q
2	Henry Clay David Sturge	Great Britain	6:56.12	Q
3	Brian Love; Mike Neary	Canada	6:56.91	Q
4	Ian Luxford; Chris Shinners	Australia	7:06.18	
5	Mogens Rasmussen; Kim Rørbæk	Denmark	7:11.13	
6	Raúl Bagattini; Guilherme Campos	Brazil	7:22.32	

=== Semifinals ===
==== Semifinal 1 ====
Rank	Rowers	Nation	Time	Notes
1	Bernd Landvoigt; Jörg Landvoigt	East Germany	6:33.02	QA
2	Vojtěch Caska; Miroslav Knapek	Czechoslovakia	6:33.14	QA
3	Georgi Georgiev; Valentin Stoev	Bulgaria	6:33.23	QA
4	Leo Ahonen; Kari Hanska	Finland	6:35.53	QB
5	Brian Love; Mike Neary	Canada	6:45.05	QB
6	Tiit Helmja; Gennadi Kinko	Soviet Union	6:55.08	QB

==== Semifinal 2 ====
Rank	Rowers	Nation	Time	Notes
1	Calvin Coffey; Mike Staines	United States	6:33.25	QA
2	Zlatko Celent; Duško Mrduljaš	Yugoslavia	6:34.18	QA
3	Peter van Roye; Thomas Strauß	West Germany	6:35.27	QA
4	Willem Boeschoten; Jan van der Horst	Netherlands	6:36.84	QB
5	Alfons Ślusarski; Zbigniew Ślusarski	Poland	6:44.64	QB
6	Henry Clay David Sturge	Great Britain	6:49.58	QB

=== Finals ===
==== Final B ====
Rank	Rowers	Nation	Time
7	Tiit Helmja; Gennadi Kinko	Soviet Union	7:26.27
8	Leo Ahonen; Kari Hanska	Finland	7:29.09
9	Brian Love; Mike Neary	Canada	7:30.024
10	Willem Boeschoten; Jan van der Horst	Netherlands	7:31.40
11	Alfons Ślusarski; Zbigniew Ślusarski	Poland	7:35.53
12	Henry Clay David Sturge	Great Britain	7:36.12

==== Final A ====
Rank	Rowers	Nation	Time
1st place, gold medalist(s)	Bernd Landvoigt; Jörg Landvoigt	East Germany	7:23.31
2nd place, silver medalist(s)	Calvin Coffey; Mike Staines	United States	7:26.73
3rd place, bronze medalist(s)	Peter van Roye; Thomas Strauß	West Germany	7:30.03
4	Zlatko Celent; Duško Mrduljaš	Yugoslavia	7:34.17
5	Georgi Georgiev; Valentin Stoev	Bulgaria	7:37.42
6	Vojtěch Caska; Miroslav Knapek	Czechoslovakia	7:51.06

== Final classification ==
Rank	Rowers	Country
1st place, gold medalist(s)	Bernd Landvoigt; Jörg Landvoigt	East Germany
2nd place, silver medalist(s)	Calvin Coffey; Mike Staines	United States
3rd place, bronze medalist(s)	Peter van Roye; Thomas Strauß	West Germany
4	Zlatko Celent; Duško Mrduljaš	Yugoslavia
5	Valentin Stoev; Georgi Georgiev	Bulgaria
6	Miroslav Knapek; Vojtěch Caska	Czechoslovakia
7	Gennadi Kinko; Tiit Helmja	Soviet Union
8	Leo Ahonen; Kari Hanska	Finland
9	Brian Love; Mike Neary	Canada
10	Jan van der Horst; Willem Boeschoten	Netherlands
11	Alfons Ślusarski; Zbigniew Ślusarski	Poland
12	David Sturge; Henry Clay	Great Britain
13	Ian Luxford; Chris Shinners	Australia
14	Kim Rørbæk; Mogens Rasmussen	Denmark
15	Guilherme Campos; Raúl Bagattini	Brazil
