= 1975 World Rowing Championships =

International rowing event

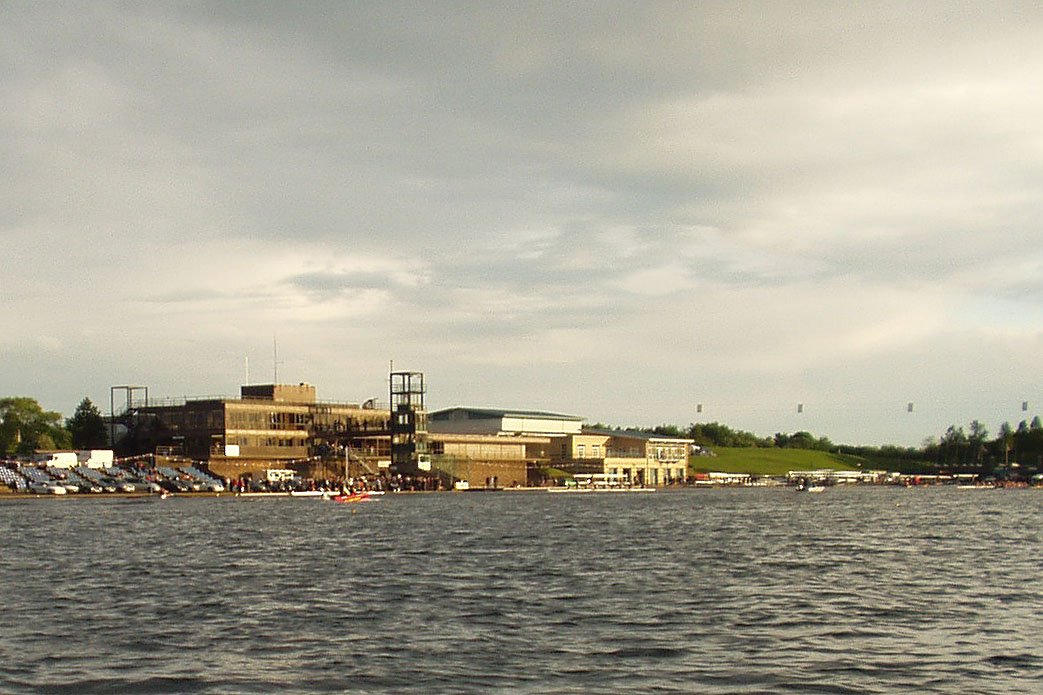
- View of Holme Pierrepont over Rowing Lake
- Venue: Holme Pierrepont National Watersports Centre
- Location: Nottingham, United Kingdom
- Dates: 21–30 August 1975

The 1975 World Rowing Championships was the fifth World Rowing Championships. It was held from 21 to 30 August at Holme Pierrepont National Watersports Centre in Nottingham, England, United Kingdom.

== Medal summary ==
Medalists at the 1975 World Rowing Championships were:

=== Men's events ===
Event	Gold		Silver		Bronze	
Event	Country & rowers	Time	Country & rowers	Time	Country & rowers	Time
M1x	West Germany; Peter-Michael Kolbe	7:10.08	Ireland; Seán Drea	7:12.50	East Germany; Martin Winter	7:13.83
M2x	Norway; Alf Hansen; Frank Hansen	6:34.49	East Germany; Joachim Dreifke; Jürgen Bertow	6:35.10	Great Britain; Chris Baillieu; Michael Hart	6:39.61
M4x	East Germany; Stefan Weiße; Wolfgang Güldenpfennig; Wolfgang Hönig; Christof Kreuziger	5:57.44	Czechoslovakia; Filip Koudela; Zdeněk Pecka; Václav Vochoska; Jaroslav Hellebrand		Soviet Union; Vytautas Butkus; Yuriy Yakimov; Aivars Lazdenieks; Yevgeniy Duleyev	
M2-	East Germany; Bernd Landvoigt; Jörg Landvoigt	7:06.40	Bulgaria; Georgi Georgiev; Valentin Stoev	7:10.81	Netherlands; Jan van der Horst; Willem Boeschoten	7:11.49
M4-	East Germany; Siegfried Brietzke; Andreas Decker; Stefan Semmler; Wolfgang Mager	6:13.81	Soviet Union; Raul Arnemann; Nikolay Kuznetsov; Sergei Pozdeev; Anushavan Gassan-Dzhalalov	6:18.82	Romania; Nicolae Simion; Ernest Gal; Christian Georgescu; Constantin Nistoroiu	6:24.09
M2+	East Germany; Jörg Lucke; Wolfgang Gunkel; Bernd Fritsch (cox)	7:16.24	Poland; Ryszard Stadniuk; Grzegorz Stellak; Ryszard Kubiak (cox)	7:19.43	West Germany; Thomas Hitzbleck; Klaus Jäger; Holger Hocke (cox)	7:20.13
M4+	Soviet Union; Vladimir Eshinov; Nikolay Ivanov; Aleksandr Sema; Aleksandr Klepikov; Aleksandr Lukyanov (cox)	6:31.46	East Germany; Andreas Schulz; Rüdiger Kunze; Walter Dießner; Ullrich Dießner; Wolfgang Groß (cox)	6:36.47	West Germany; Hans-Johann Färber; Ralph Kubail; Dieter Knief; Peter Niehusen; Hartmut Wenzel (cox)	6:40.93
M8+	East Germany; Jürgen Arndt; Gottfried Döhn; Dieter Wendisch; Friedrich-Wilhelm Ulrich; Werner Klatt; Roland Kostulski; Ulrich Karnatz; Karl-Heinz Prudöhl; Klaus-Dieter Ludwig (cox)	5:39.01	Soviet Union; Igor Konnov; Aleksandr Plyushkin; Evgeni Iankovski; Vasily Potapov; Nikolay Ivanov; Vladimir Vasilyev; Antanas Čikotas; Anatoli Nititrev; Igor Rudakov (cox)	5:41.34	New Zealand; Grant McAuley; Alec McLean; Dave Rodger; Joe Earl; Lindsay Wilson; Ross Collinge; Trevor Coker; Peter Dignan; David Simmons (cox)	5:43.61
Lightweight events
LM1x	Switzerland; Reto Wyss	7:41.69	Austria; Raimund Haberl	7:48.04	United States; Bill Belden	7:51.61
LM4-	France; Francis Pelegri; Michel Picard; André Coupat; André Picard	6:47.31	Great Britain; Nicholas Tee; Graeme Hall; Christopher Drury; Daniel Topolski	6:49.23	Australia; Campbell Johnstone; Andrew Michelmore; Geoffrey Rees; Colin Smith	6:52.13
LM8+	West Germany; Hans-Hermann Meyer; Paul Lutz; Ekkehard Braun; Gerd Maye; Wolfgang Fritsch; Volker Buhren; Günter Lobing; Bernd Kerkhoff; Frank Neumeister (cox)	6:26.09	United States; Charles Hoffman; David Vogel; John Dunn; Eric Aserlind; William Sawyer; Rodney Johnson; Sean Colgan; Leif Soderberg; Richard Grossman (cox)	6:27.88	Great Britain; Brian Fentiman; Nigel Read; Stewart Fraser; Thomas Moffat; Mark Harris; Stephen Simpole; Christopher George; Anthony Stocking; Alan Sherman (cox)	6:29.87

=== Women's events ===
Event	Gold		Silver		Bronze	
Event	Country & rowers	Time	Country & rowers	Time	Country & rowers	Time
W1x	East Germany; Christine Scheiblich	3:55.75	Hungary; Mariann Ambrus	4:06.29	Soviet Union; Genovaitė Ramoškienė	4:08.02
W2x	Soviet Union; Yelena Antonova; Galina Yermolayeva	3:33.70	East Germany; Sabine Jahn; Petra Boesler	3:34.99	Bulgaria; Svetla Otsetova; Zdravka Yordanova	3:37.40
W4x+	East Germany; Roswietha Zobelt; Ursula Unger; Jutta Lau; Anke Grünberg; Liane Weigelt (cox)	3:21.61	Bulgaria; Iskra Velinova; Verka Aleksieva; Trajanka Vladimirova; Svetlana Gincheva; Stanka Vakrilova (cox)	3:24.12	Soviet Union; Nadejda Sherbak; Valentina Ivgenkova; Galina Beliaeva; Antonina Maryskina; Irina Moisseenko (cox)	3:26.33
W2-	East Germany; Sabine Dähne; Angelika Noack	3:49.83	Soviet Union; Ianina Gjigowska; Ruta Veinzerga	3:50.61	Romania; Marilena Ghita; Marlene Predescu	3:54.25
W4+	East Germany; Helma Lehmann; Henrietta Dobler; Dagmar Bauer; Irina Müller; Sabine Brincker (cox)	3:24.18	Bulgaria; Mariyka Modeva; Reni Jordanova; Lilyana Vaseva; Ginka Gyurova; Kapka Georgieva (cox)	3:27.77	West Germany; Thea Einöder; Edith Eckbauer; Doris Leifermann; Karin Gondolatsch; Susanne Thienel (cox)	3:29.80
W8+	East Germany; Viola Goretzki; Christiane Knetsch; Ilona Richter; Bianka Schwede; Monika Kallies; Renate Neu; Rosel Nitsche; Doris Mosig; Marina Wilke (cox)	3:14.53	United States; Christine Ernst; Carol Brown; Nancy Storrs; Wiki Royden; Claudia Schneider; Anne Warner; Gail Pierson; Carie Graves; Lynn Silliman (cox)	3:16.21	Romania; Elena Avram; Luliana Balaban; Valeria Avram; Aurelia Marinescu; Cristel Wiener; Filigonia Toll; Florica Petcu; Elena Oprea; Aneta Matei (cox)	3:18.50

=== Event codes ===
	single sculls	double sculls	quadruple sculls	quad sculls (coxed)	pair (coxless)	four (coxless)	coxed pair	coxed four	eight (coxed)
Men's	M1x	M2x	M4x		M2-	M4-	M2+	M4+	M8+
Lightweight men's	LM1x					LM4-			LM8+
Women's	W1x	W2x		W4x+	W2-			W4+	W8+

== Medal table ==
Medals by country (including lightweight rowing events):

	Country	(gold) Gold	(silver) Silver	(bronze) Bronze	Total
1	East Germany	10	3	1	14
2	Soviet Union	2	3	3	8
3	West Germany	2	0	3	5
4	France	1	0	0	1
4	Norway	1	0	0	1
4	Switzerland	1	0	0	1
7	Bulgaria	0	3	1	4
8	United States	0	2	1	3
9	Great Britain	0	1	2	3
10	Austria	0	1	0	1
10	Hungary	0	1	0	1
10	Ireland	0	1	0	1
10	Poland	0	1	0	1
10	Czechoslovakia	0	1	0	1
15	Romania	0	0	3	3
16	Australia	0	0	1	1
16	Netherlands	0	0	1	1
16	New Zealand	0	0	1	1
Total		17	17	17	51

== Finals ==
Event	1st	2nd	3rd	4th	5th	6th
M1x	West Germany	Ireland	East Germany	Finland	Argentina	Soviet Union
M2x	Norway	East Germany	Great Britain	Czechoslovakia	West Germany	Soviet Union
M4x	East Germany	Czechoslovakia	Soviet Union	France	Bulgaria	Great Britain
M2-	East Germany	Bulgaria	Netherlands	Finland	Poland	Romania
M4-	East Germany	Soviet Union	Romania	Great Britain	Czechoslovakia	West Germany
M2+	East Germany	Poland	West Germany	Soviet Union	United States	Czechoslovakia
M4+	Soviet Union	East Germany	West Germany	Great Britain	Czechoslovakia	Romania
M8+	East Germany	Soviet Union	New Zealand	Czechoslovakia	United States	Australia
LM1x	Switzerland	Austria	United States	Mexico	Netherlands	Australia
LM4-	France	Great Britain	Australia	United States	Netherlands	West Germany
LM8+	West Germany	United States	Great Britain	Sweden	Netherlands	Canada
W1x	East Germany	Hungary	Soviet Union	West Germany	United States	Poland
W2x	Soviet Union	East Germany	Bulgaria	West Germany	Czechoslovakia	France
W4x+	East Germany	Bulgaria	Soviet Union	Hungary	United States	Romania
W2-	East Germany	Soviet Union	Romania	Bulgaria	Poland	Czechoslovakia
W4+	East Germany	Bulgaria	West Germany	Soviet Union	Netherlands	United States
W8+	East Germany	United States	Romania	Netherlands	Soviet Union	West Germany

== Great Britain ==
Event		Notes
M1x	N/A	no entry
M2x	Chris Baillieu & Michael Hart	bronze medal in A final
M4x	Tom Bishop, Graeme Mulcahy, Mark Hayter, Dick Findlay	6th in A final
M2-	David Sturge & Henry Clay	unplaced
M4-	Bill Mason, Jim Clark, Lenny Robertson, John Yallop	4th in A final
M2+	N/A	no entry
M4+	Richard Lester, Hugh Matheson, Tim Crooks, Richard Ayling, Patrick Sweeney (cox)	4th in A final
M8+	Ian Wilson, John Burch, Gordon Rankine, Stephen Irving, David Townsend, James MacLeod, Adrian Friend, David Sprague, Simon Jefferies (cox)	3rd in B final
LM1x	Peter Zeun	3rd in B final
L4-	Graeme Hall, Christopher Drury, Nicholas Tee, Daniel Topolski	silver medal in A final
L8	Brian Fentiman, Nigel Read, Stewart Fraser, Thomas Moffat, Mark Harris; Stephen Simpole, Christopher George, Anthony Stocking, Alan Sherman (cox)	bronze medal in A Final
W1x	Diana Bishop	6th in B final
W2x	N/A	no entry
W4x	N/A	no entry
W2-	N/A	no entry
W4+	Beryl Mitchell, Clare Grove, Lin Clark, Gill Webb, Pauline Wright (cox)	3rd in B final
W8+	Sue Handscomb, Jackie Darling, Maggie Lambourn, Jean Guppy, Ann Cork; Helen McFie, Rosie Clugston, Pauline Bird, Sue Bailey (cox)	4th in B final
