= The Boat Race 1975 =

121st Boat Race
- Date: 29 March 1975
- Winner: Cambridge
- Margin of victory: 3 3/4 lengths
- Winning time: 19 minutes 27 seconds
- Overall record (Cambridge–Oxford): 68–52
- Umpire: Christopher Davidge (Oxford)

Other races
- Reserve winner: Isis
- Women's winner: Cambridge

The 121st Boat Race took place on 29 March 1975. Held annually, the Boat Race is a side-by-side rowing race between crews from the Universities of Oxford and Cambridge along the River Thames. Cambridge won their seventh race in eight years by 3 3/4 lengths in a time of 19 minutes and 27 seconds. The race was umpired by former Oxford rower Christopher Davidge.

In the reserve race, Oxford's Isis beat Cambridge's Goldie by 9 1/2 lengths. Cambridge won the 30th Women's Boat Race.

== Background ==
The Boat Race is a side-by-side rowing competition between the University of Oxford (sometimes referred to as the "Dark Blues") and the University of Cambridge (sometimes referred to as the "Light Blues"). The race was first held in 1829, and since 1845 has taken place on the 4.2-mile (6.8 km) Championship Course on the River Thames in southwest London. The rivalry is a major point of honour between the two universities, followed throughout the United Kingdom and broadcast worldwide. Oxford went into the race as reigning champions, having won the previous year's race by 5 1/2 lengths, with Cambridge leading overall with 67 victories to Oxford's 52 (excluding the "dead heat" of 1877). The umpire for the race was Christopher Davidge, who had rowed for Oxford in the 1949, 1951 and 1952 races, and was a non-rowing Oxford University Boat Club president for the 1950 race.

The first Women's Boat Race took place in 1927, but did not become an annual fixture until the 1960s. Up until 2014, the contest was conducted as part of the Henley Boat Races, but as of the 2015 race, it is held on the River Thames, on the same day as the men's main and reserve races. The reserve race, contested between Oxford's Isis boat and Cambridge's Goldie boat has been held since 1965. It usually takes place on the Tideway, prior to the main Boat Race.

In the month leading up to the race, Cambridge's crew saw some significant changes, including the removal of David Sturge (who had rowed in the 1973 race) due to glandular fever. However, the Cambridge boat club president Steve Tourek was circumspect: "Cambridge might be slower than planned but still fast enough to beat Oxford." On 24 March 1975, Cambridge beat Oxford's record time (set five days earlier) between Hammersmith Bridge and the Mile Post by two seconds. The following day, Oxford's coach Dan Topolski (who had rowed for the Dark Blues in the 1967 and 1968 races) revealed that the Oxford reserve crew, Isis, had equalled the record time, downplaying Cambridge's efforts: "Shows how fast conditions really were yesterday." Cambridge coach Lou Barry remarked of his charges: "this is a fast crew".

== Crews ==
The Cambridge crew weighed an average of 13 st 9.75 lb (86.8 kg), 7 pounds (3.2 kg) per rower more than their opponents. Oxford's crew contained two former Blues in boat club president Nick Tee and stroke Graham Innes, while Cambridge saw Nick Bradley and Henry Clay return from the 1974 boat. Although the British international rower David Sturge was replaced through illness prior to the race, the Light Blues also saw international-standard rowers Alistair Christie and James Macleod in the crew, both of whom had withdrawn from selection for the 1974 race to represent Great Britain. Only two competitors in the race were registered as "overseas" Blues, Oxford's number five John Hutchings and his counterpart and Tourek, both from the United States.

Seat	Oxford			Cambridge		
Seat	Name	College	Weight	Name	College	Weight
Bow	A. G. H. Baird	Christ Church	13 st 1 lb	C. Langridge	1st & 3rd Trinity	13 st 7 lb
2	M. G. C. Harris	Oriel	11 st 8 lb	N. C. A. Bradley	Pembroke	12 st 11 lb
3	D. R. H. Beak	Oriel	13 st 2 lb	J. H. Clay	Pembroke	13 st 4 lb
4	C. J. A. N. Money-Coutts	Keble	14 st 7 lb	A. F. U. Powell	St Catharine's	13 st 2 lb
5	J. E. Hutchings	Christ Church	14 st 2 lb	S. C. Tourek (P)	1st & 3rd Trinity	14 st 8 lb
6	R. S. Mason	Keble	14 st 1 lb	J. MacLeod	Lady Margaret Boat Club	14 st 5 lb
7	N. D. C. Tee (P)	Balliol	11 st 8 lb	P. J. Robinson	Lady Margaret Boat Club	13 st 6 lb
Stroke	G. S. Innes	Oriel	13 st 7 lb	A. N. Christie	Lady Margaret Boat Club	14 st 7 lb
Cox	J. N. Calvert	St Edmund Hall	8 st 2 lb	D. J. T. Kitchin	Fitzwilliam	8 st 12 lb
Source: (P) – boat club president

== Race ==
The Championship Course

Cambridge started as pre-race favourite; according to the author and former rower Dickie Burnell, although Oxford had some "useful new recruits" no-one "outside their immediate camp thought they could win." Oxford won the toss and elected to start from the Surrey station. Oxford took an early lead, but by the Mile Post, Cambridge had recovered to lead by two seconds. Extending their lead, the Light Blues gained a clear water advantage by Harrods Furniture Depository and moved in front of the Dark Blue boat. Shooting Hammersmith Bridge five seconds ahead, Cambridge held a length-and-a-quarter lead, which they defended against a number of Oxford pushes. Midway round the Surrey bend, Oxford's bow man Andrew Baird's oar came out of its gate, allowing Cambridge to increase their lead by another length. A seven-second lead at Chiswick Steps was extended to nine seconds by Barnes Bridge, and along the final bend, Cambridge pushed their lead further out to nearly four lengths, passing the finishing post in 19 minutes 27 seconds, thirteen seconds ahead of their rivals. It was Cambridge's seventh victory in the previous eight years, having lost to Oxford in 1974.

In the reserve race, Oxford's Isis beat Cambridge's Goldie by 9 1/2 lengths, their first win since the 1966 race. In the 30th running of the Women's Boat Race, Cambridge triumphed, winning their 13th consecutive race.

== Reaction ==
Oxford's Baird claimed "I might have caught a crab, but I do not really know what happened." Cambridge number six MacLeod said of the Dark Blues: "They kept coming at us time and time again. I was only sure of victory in the last mile of the race." Christopher Dodd, writing in The Guardian was impressed: "The contest had a rare element ... it was a race nearly all the way, and was not all over in the first 20 stokes as has so often been the case in recent years." Burnell suggested it was a race for the aficionados: "This was surely one of those so common Boat Races, which are hard fought all the way, yet never exciting from the point of view of the average spectator."
