= Wheare =

Wheare is a surname. Notable people with the surname include:

- Degory Wheare (1573–1647), historian, the first Camden Professor of Ancient History in the University of Oxford
- Kenneth Wheare CMG (1907–1979), Australian academic who spent most of his career at Oxford University in England
- Tom Wheare FRSA (born 1944), English school teacher and headmaster
- Henry Wheare (born 1952), Cambridge and GB cox, and Hong Kong Vice-President of the Asian Patent Attorneys Association
