= Ślusarski =

Ślusarski (feminine Ślusarska) is a Polish occupational surname, derived from the word "ślusarz" meaning 'locksmith'. Notable people with the surname include:

- Alfons Ślusarski (born 1942), Polish rower
- Bartosz Ślusarski (born 1981), Polish footballer
- Joe Slusarski (born 1966), American baseball player
- Tadeusz Ślusarski (1950–1998), Polish pole vaulter
- Zbigniew Ślusarski (1947–2004), Polish rower
