= Christof Kreuziger =

German rower

Personal information
- Born: 29 November 1948 (age 77)
- Height: 187 cm (6 ft 2 in)
- Weight: 85 kg (187 lb)

Sport
- Sport: Rowing
- Club: SC Berlin-Grünau
Medal record
Men's rowing
Representing East Germany
World Rowing Championships
Gold medal – first place	1974 Lucerne	Double scull
Gold medal – first place	1975 Nottingham	Quad scull
European Rowing Championships
Gold medal – first place	1973 Moscow	Double scull

Christof Kreuziger (born 29 November 1948) is a German rower. He won gold medals for East Germany at the 1973 European Rowing Championships and the 1974 World Rowing Championships in double scull, and at the 1975 World Rowing Championships in quad scull.

== Rowing career ==
Kreuziger was born in 1948. He appears in East German media reports about rowing from 1969 onwards, starting for TSC Berlin which later that year became SC Berlin-Grünau. In 1970, he teamed up with fellow club member Götz Draeger in the double scull and they came third in the East German championships. Kreuziger also competed in the single scull in 1970 and won an international regatta on Lake Ossiach near Villach in Austria.

At the 1971 East German national championships, Kreuziger competed in the single scull and was beaten by Draeger for second place.

In May 1972, Kreuziger won in single scull at a regatta in Copenhagen. At the East German national championships in July 1972, Kreuziger won in the double scull partnered with Jürgen Bertow, but the best rowers were not present as they were preparing for the Olympics. Five rowers from his club were announced as participants at the 1972 Summer Olympics in Munich, and Kreuziger was not one of them.

For 1973, Kreuziger partnered with Uli Schmied in the double scull; Schmied had won Olympic bronze in the previous year. In June, they won an international regatta in Berlin. At a regatta on the Rotsee in Lucerne, Switzerland in July, they came first. Later that month, the duo won the East German championships. SC Berlin-Grünau also entered a quad scull team to the national championships that included Kreuziger, and the team came third. The highlight of that year's rowing season were the 1973 European Rowing Championships, which until that year were regarded as the unofficial world championships; world championships were held annually from 1974 onwards. Kreuziger and Schmied won gold in the double scull; they beat the 1972 Olympic winners, Gennadi Korshikov and Aleksandr Timoshinin, by seven seconds. In January 1974, he was awarded Master of Sport, an East German honorary award.

Kreuziger and Schmied won the first international regatta of 1974, held in Moscow in early June. They also won international regattas in Berlin and Nottingham later the same month. As in the previous two occasions, they won the East Germany championships in 1974. In 1974, quad scull teams were formed by rowers from different clubs, and the composite team made up of Schmied, Kreuziger, Wolfgang Hönig, and Bernd Frieberg came second. Kreuziger and Schmied went to the 1974 World Rowing Championships as double scull favourites and did not disappoint, winning gold at the competition on the Rotsee in Lucerne. In November 1974, Kreuziger was awarded the honorary award Deserved Master of Sport and a Patriotic Order of Merit in bronze.

Early in the 1975 season, Kreuziger's double scull partner Schmied was injured and could not train, and they were beaten by Joachim Dreifke and Jürgen Bertow at a regatta in Berlin. At the East German championships, they came third, and the combination of Dreifke and Bertow took the national title. Kreuziger also competed in the quad scull in a team with Stefan Weiße, Wolfgang Güldenpfennig, and Wolfgang Hönig, and whilst they were the favourites that year, a boat with Joachim Dreifke, Martin Winter, Rüdiger Reiche, and Jürgen Bertow had a clear lead. Winter caught a crab close to the finish line, and Kreuziger's team won the national championship. According to the result of the national championships, the successful quad scull team with Kreuziger was nominated for the 1975 World Rowing Championships in Nottingham, and they were successful at gaining the world championship title.

In 1976, Kreuziger teamed up with Stefan Weiße to compete at the Moscow regatta in May; they were beaten by a Soviet team. Neither Kreuziger nor Weiße were included when the nominations for the 1976 Summer Olympics were announced in June.

== Private life ==
Kreuziger is married. In late 1973, he had a son—Hannes—who became a singer-songwriter.
