= Pelegri =

Pelegri, Pelegrí, or Pélégri are surnames. Notable people with these surnames include:

- Assimina Pelegri (born 1968), Greek-American materials scientist
- Francis Pelegri (born 1952), French rower
- Jean Pélégri (1920–2003), French-Algerian writer and academic
- Maria Teresa Pelegrí i Marimón (1907–1996), Spanish composer
- Óscar Pelegrí (born 1994), Spanish cyclist
- Xavier Pelegrí (born 1981), Spanish footballer

== See also ==
- Pelegrí Clavé (1811–1880), Spanish painter
