= Stefan Weiße =

German rower

Personal information
- Born: 12 November 1953
- Died: 11 November 2015 (aged 61)
- Spouse: Irina (née Müller)

Sport
- Sport: Rowing
- Club: SC Einheit Dresden
Medal record
Men's rowing
Representing East Germany
World Rowing Championships
Gold medal – first place	1975 Nottingham	Quad scull

Stefan Weiße (12 November 1953 – 11 November 2015) was a German rower. He was quad scull world champion for East Germany in 1975.

== Rowing ==
Weiße took up rowing at age 14 and was a member of SC Einheit Dresden. In 1973, Weiße came second at the East German championships in the quad scull teamed up with Wolfgang Hönig, Günter Berschel, and Bernd Frieberg. At the 1974 East German championships, Weiße competed in the single sculls and came third. He also teamed up with Armin Schulze in the double scull, where they came third.

At the 1975 East German championships, Weiße competed in the quad scull in a team with Christof Kreuziger, Wolfgang Güldenpfennig, and Wolfgang Hönig, and whilst they were the favourites that year, a boat with Joachim Dreifke, Martin Winter, Rüdiger Reiche, and Jürgen Bertow had a clear lead. Winter caught a crab close to the finish line, and Weiße's team won the national championship. According to the result of the national championships, the successful quad scull team with Weiße was nominated for the 1975 World Rowing Championships in Nottingham, and they were successful at gaining the world championship title.

In 1976, Weiße replaced the 1974 world champion Uli Schmied to team up with Christof Kreuziger for the Moscow regatta in May that opened the rowing season; they were beaten by a Soviet team. Neither Kreuziger nor Weiße were included when the nominations for the 1976 Summer Olympics were announced in June. At the 1976 East German championships, Weiße competed in the quad scull in a team that came third.

Having retired from rowing in 1980, Weiße took up the sport again in 2012 after being encouraged by his wife and one of his daughters, both active rowers for SV Energie Berlin. Weiße had entered with a mixed quad scull team at the 2014 World Rowing Masters Regatta in Ballarat, but was stopped by a doctor from competing after having already travelled to Australia.

== Private life ==
Weiße lived in Dresden apart from his time as a university student in Halle. He married Irina Müller just after the 1976 Olympic Games, and they had four children. Their daughter, Annika, is a representative rower for Germany. Returning from his 2014 trip to Australia, he was diagnosed with cancer and died on 11 November 2015.
