= 1974 World Rowing Championships =

International rowing event

- Venue: Rotsee
- Location: Lucerne, Switzerland
- Dates: Men (4–8 September); Women (29 August – 1 September)

The 1974 World Rowing Championships was the fourth World Rowing Championships. It was held from 4 to 8 September 1974 (for men) and from 29 August to 1 September 1974 (for women) on the Rotsee in Lucerne, Switzerland. The event was significantly extended from the 1970 edition, with the addition of both women's and lightweight men's events. Six women boat classes were added, three lightweight men classes, plus quad scull for men, increasing the number of boat classes from seven in 1970 to seventeen in 1974. This was also the last World Championships held on a quadrennial cycle – from this point, World Championships were held annually.

== Medal summary ==
Medalists at the 1974 World Rowing Championships:

=== Men's events ===
| Event | Gold | | Silver | | Bronze | |
| Event | Country & rowers | Time | Country & rowers | Time | Country & rowers | Time |
|---|---|---|---|---|---|---|
| M1x | East Germany; Wolfgang Hönig | 7:20.11 | United States; Jim Dietz | 7:23.95 | Soviet Union; Mykola Dovhan | 7:24.74 |
| M2x | East Germany; Christof Kreuziger; Uli Schmied | 6:35.95 | Norway; Alf Hansen; Frank Hansen | 6:38.34 | Great Britain; Chris Baillieu; Michael Hart | 6:43.32 |
| M4x | East Germany; Joachim Dreifke; Götz Draeger; Rüdiger Reiche; Jürgen Bertow | 6:04.01 | Soviet Union; Mustafajew; Kochel; Yuriy Yakimov; Gennadi Korshikov | 6:05.79 | Czechoslovakia; Filip Koudela; Zdeněk Pecka; Miroslav Laholík; Jaroslav Hellebrand | 6:08.12 |
| M2- | East Germany; Bernd Landvoigt; Jörg Landvoigt | 6:59.09 | Romania; Ilie Oantă; Dumitru Grumecescu | 7:03.99 | Poland; Alfons Ślusarski; Zbigniew Ślusarski | 7:04.64 |
| M4- | East Germany; Siegfried Brietzke; Andreas Decker; Stefan Semmler; Wolfgang Mager | 6:19.20 | Soviet Union; Raul Arnemann; Nikolay Kuznetsov; Sergei Posdejew; Anushavan Gassan-Dzhalalov | 6:22.83 | West Germany; Peter van Roye; Klaus Jäger; Bernd Truschinski; Reinhard Wendemuth | 6:27.01 |
| M2+ | Soviet Union; Vladimir Eshinov; Nikolay Ivanov; Aleksandr Lukyanov | 7:21.90 | East Germany; Wolfgang Gunkel; Jörg Lucke; Klaus-Dieter Neubert | 7:27.86 | Czechoslovakia; Oldřich Svojanovský; Pavel Svojanovský; Vladimír Petříček | 7:29.93 |
| M4+ | East Germany; Andreas Schulz; Rüdiger Kunze; Ullrich Dießner; Walter Dießner; Wolfgang Groß | 6:26.38 | Soviet Union; Gennadi Moskowski; Alexander Pljuschkin; Vladimir Vasilyev; Anatoli Nemtyrjow; Igor Rudakov | 6:27.34 | West Germany; Hans-Johann Färber; Ralph Kubail; Peter-Michael Kolbe; Peter Niehusen; Uwe Benter | 6:27.98 |
| M8+ | United States; Alan Shealy; Hugh Stevenson; Richard Cashin; Mark Norelius; John Everett; Mike Vespoli; Tim Mickelson; Kenneth Brown; David Weinberg | 5:46.37 | Great Britain; Frederick Smallbone; John Yallop; Tim Crooks; Hugh Matheson; David Maxwell; Jim Clark; Bill Mason; Lenny Robertson; Patrick Sweeney | 5:47.49 | New Zealand; Tony Hurt; Danny Keane; Lindsay Wilson; Joe Earl; Trevor Coker; Alec McLean; Dave Rodger; Ross Blomfield; David Simmons | 5:47.84 |
Lightweight events
| LM1x | United States; Bill Belden | 7:33.72 | Netherlands; Harald Punt | 7:36.80 | Switzerland; Reto Wyss | 7:36.96 |
| LM4- | Australia; Campbell Johnstone; Andrew Michelmore; Geoffrey Rees; Colin Smith | 6:38.12 | Netherlands; Los; Hans Pieterman; Jannes Bruyn; Hans Lycklama | 6:43.26 | United States; Andrew Washburn; Barry Selick; James Ehrmann; Peter Huntsman | 6:43.48 |
| LM8+ | United States; H. Scott Baker; Joseph Gaynor; Ralph Nauman; David Harman; Eric Aserlind; Richard Ewing; Mick Feld; Richard Grogan; John Hartigan | 6:15.25 | Netherlands; Cornelis Bos; L. Burghgraef; E. van der Snoek; W. Mulder; B. van Aken; G. van der Werff; Ch. Hoynck van Papendrecht; H. Hommen; M. van de Broek | 6:17.54 | West Germany; Uwe Barwig; Wolfgang Fritsch; Paul Lutz; Julius Nick; Lutz Kalmbacher; Michael Speth; Ekkehard Braun; Wolfgang Gabler; Willi Seyer | 6:17.54 |

=== Women's events ===
| Event | Gold | | Silver | | Bronze | |
| Event | Country & rowers | Time | Country & rowers | Time | Country & rowers | Time |
|---|---|---|---|---|---|---|
| W1x | East Germany; Christine Scheiblich | 3:46.52 | Soviet Union; Genovaitė Ramoškienė | 3:52.38 | Belgium; Christine Wasterlain | 3:53.08 |
| W2x | Soviet Union; Yelena Antonova; Galina Yermolayeva | 3:24.00 | West Germany; Astrid Ayling; Regine Adam | 3:26.43 | East Germany; Gisela Medefindt; Rita Schmidt | 3:28.78 |
| W4x+ | East Germany; Roswietha Reichel; Ursula Wagner; Jutta Lau; Sybille Tietze; Liane Weigelt | 3:19.81 | Romania; Ioana Tudoran; Elisabeta Lazăr; Doina Bardas; Teodora Boicu; Elena Giurcă | 3:21.92 | Soviet Union; Nadeschda Scherbak; Nataliya Horodilova; Walentina Iwtschenkowa; Antonina Marischkina; Irina Moisejenko | 3:22.64 |
| W2- | Romania; Marilena Ghita; Cornelia Neascu | 3:43.12 | East Germany; Renate Bänsch; Bergit Heinze | 3:45.18 | Soviet Union; Janina Tschigowskaja; Ruta Weinzerga | 3:45.43 |
| W4+ | East Germany; Rosel Nitsche; Angelika Noack; Renate Schlenzig; Sabine Dähne; Christa Karnath | 3:28.99 | Netherlands; Liesbeth Vosmaer-de Bruin; Ingrid Munneke-Dusseldorp; Myriam Steenman; Liesbeth de Graaff; Marijke Kraayenhof | 3:31.19 | Romania; Marlena Predescu; Kabat; Avram; Chertic; Aneta Matei | 3:32.71 |
| W8+ | East Germany; Henrietta Dobler; Helma Lehmann; Ilona Richter; Bianka Schwede; Brigitte Ahrenholz; Irina Müller; Gunhild Blanke; Doris Mosig; Sabine Brincker | 3:04.82 | Soviet Union; Nina Bystrova; Valentina Rubtsova; Nina Abramova; Sofia Shurkalova; Valentina Jermakova; Sergejewa; Vera Alexeyeva; Nina Filatova; Nina Frolova | 3:05.05 | Romania; Elena Oprea; Florica Petcu; Georgeta Militaru; Cristel Wiener; Aurelia Marinescu; Luliana Balaban; Avram; Chertic; Aneta Matei | 3:08.31 |

=== Event codes ===
| | single sculls | double sculls | quadruple sculls | pair (coxless) | four (coxless) | coxed pair | coxed four | eight (coxed) |
| Men's | M1x | M2x | M4x | M2- | M4- | M2+ | M4+ | M8+ |
| Lightweight men's | LM1x | | | | LM4- | | | LM8+ |
| Women's | W1x | W2x | W4x | W2- | | | W4+ | W8+ |

== Medal table ==
Medals by country (including lightweight rowing events):

| | Country | (gold) Gold | (silver) Silver | (bronze) Bronze | Total |
|---|---|---|---|---|---|
| 1 | East Germany | 10 | 2 | 1 | 13 |
| 2 | United States | 3 | 1 | 1 | 5 |
| 3 | Soviet Union | 2 | 5 | 3 | 10 |
| 4 | Romania | 1 | 2 | 2 | 5 |
| 5 | Australia | 1 | 0 | 0 | 1 |
| 6 | Netherlands | 0 | 4 | 0 | 4 |
| 7 | West Germany | 0 | 1 | 3 | 4 |
| 8 | Great Britain | 0 | 1 | 1 | 2 |
| 9 | Norway | 0 | 1 | 0 | 1 |
| 10 | Czechoslovakia | 0 | 0 | 2 | 2 |
| 11 | Belgium | 0 | 0 | 1 | 1 |
| 11 | New Zealand | 0 | 0 | 1 | 1 |
| 11 | Poland | 0 | 0 | 1 | 1 |
| 11 | Switzerland | 0 | 0 | 1 | 1 |
| Total | | 17 | 17 | 17 | 51 |

== Finals ==
The following boats competed in the finals:

| Event | 1st | 2nd | 3rd | 4th | 5th | 6th |
| M1x | East Germany | United States | Soviet Union | Italy | Argentina | Finland |
| M2x | East Germany | Norway | Great Britain | Czechoslovakia | Soviet Union | Italy |
| M4x | East Germany | Soviet Union | Czechoslovakia | Switzerland | New Zealand | Bulgaria |
| M2- | East Germany | Romania | Poland | Netherlands | Czechoslovakia | West Germany |
| M4- | East Germany | Soviet Union | West Germany | New Zealand | United States | Norway |
| M2+ | Soviet Union | East Germany | Czechoslovakia | Italy | France | Romania |
| M4+ | East Germany | Soviet Union | West Germany | Czechoslovakia | Bulgaria | United States |
| M8+ | United States | Great Britain | New Zealand | East Germany | Soviet Union | West Germany |
| LM1x | United States | Netherlands | Switzerland | Great Britain | West Germany | Mexico |
| LM4- | Australia | Netherlands | United States | West Germany | Sweden | Norway |
| LM8+ | United States | Netherlands | West Germany | Canada | 4 boats only | |
| W1x | East Germany | Soviet Union | Belgium | West Germany | France | Bulgaria |
| W2x | Soviet Union | West Germany | East Germany | Poland | Netherlands | Bulgaria |
| W4x+ | East Germany | Romania | Soviet Union | West Germany | Czechoslovakia | Hungary |
| W2- | Romania | East Germany | Soviet Union | Czechoslovakia | United States | West Germany |
| W4+ | East Germany | Netherlands | Romania | France | Soviet Union | Poland |
| W8+ | East Germany | Soviet Union | Romania | West Germany | Netherlands | Poland |

== Great Britain ==
| Event | | Notes |
| M1x | N/A | no entry |
| M2x | Chris Baillieu & Michael Hart (Leander) | bronze medal in A final |
| M4x | National squad | 4th in B final |
| M2- | N/A | no entry |
| M4- | Leander | unplaced |
| M2+ | N/A | no entry |
| M4+ | Lady Margaret & London University | 3rd in B final |
| M8+ | Frederick Smallbone, John Yallop, Tim Crooks, Hugh Matheson, David Maxwell; Jim Clark, Bill Mason, Lenny Robertson, Patrick Sweeney cox, (Leander / Thames Tradesmen) | silver medal in A Final |
| LM1x | Geoff Potts (Durham) | 4th in A final |
| L4- | Graeme Hall, Christopher Drury, Nicholas Tee, Daniel Topolski (Leander) | 1st in B in final |
| L8 | N/A | no entry |
| W1x | Ann Cork | unplaced |
| W2x | N/A | no entry |
| W4x | Jackie Darling (Civil Service Ladies), Pauline Bird (Weybridge Ladies), Liz Lorrimer (Nottingham), Lorraine Baker (Derby), Karen Peer, cox (St George's Ladies) | unplaced |
| W2- | Liz Monti & Lin Clark (Civil Service Ladies) | 3rd in B final |
| W4+ | Chris Aistrop (Weybridge Ladies), Maggie Lambourn, Chris Grimes, Clare Grove, Pauline Wright, cox (all Civil Service Ladies) | 5th in B final |
| W8+ | N/A | no entry |

== New Zealand ==
The 1974 World Championships were the first that were attended by a female crew from New Zealand. The coxed four was crewed by Marion Horwell (stroke), Liz Cato, Robin Matheson, Lesley Keys, and Vicki Colville (cox). They came third in the petite final, or ninth overall.
