= André Picard =

André Picard may refer to:

- André Picard (rower) (born 1951), French lightweight rower
- André Picard (journalist), Canadian journalist
- André Picard (playwright) (1873–1926), French writer
