= Edd Hillstad =

Norwegian rower

Medal record

Men's rowing

Representing Norway

World Championships
Silver medal – second place	1976 Villach	Lwt coxless four

Edd Hillstad is a Norwegian competition rower. He received a silver medal in lightweight coxless four at the 1976 World Rowing Championships, with the team members Pål Børnick, Per Arvid Steen, Olaf Solberg and Hillstad. The championship was held in Villach, Austria.

Hillstad represented the club Stavanger RK.
