= Michael Neary =

Michael Neary may refer to:

- Michael Neary (surgeon), Irish consultant obstetrician/gynecologist
- Michael Neary (bishop) (born 1946), Roman Catholic archbishop of Tuam, Ireland
- Mike Neary (born 1948), Canadian rower
