= The Boat Race 1969 =

115th Boat Race
- Date: 5 April 1969
- Winner: Cambridge
- Margin of victory: 4 lengths
- Winning time: 18 minutes 4 seconds
- Overall record (Cambridge–Oxford): 63–51
- Umpire: A. Graham (Oxford)

Other races
- Reserve winner: Goldie
- Women's winner: Cambridge

The 115th Boat Race took place on 5 April 1969. Held annually, it is a side-by-side rowing race between crews from the Universities of Oxford and Cambridge along the River Thames. The race featured the heaviest oarsman in the history of the event in Cambridge's David Cruttenden. It was won by Cambridge who passed the finishing post four lengths ahead of Oxford, securing Cambridge's second consecutive victory. The winning time of 18 minutes 4 seconds was the third fastest in modern Boat Race history.

In the reserve race, Goldie beat Isis, and in the Women's Boat Race, Cambridge were victorious.

== Background ==
The Boat Race is a side-by-side rowing competition between the University of Oxford (sometimes referred to as the "Dark Blues") and the University of Cambridge (sometimes referred to as the "Light Blues"). The race was first held in 1829, and since 1845 has taken place on the 4.2-mile (6.8 km) Championship Course on the River Thames in southwest London. The rivalry is a major point of honour between the two universities, followed throughout the United Kingdom and broadcast worldwide. Cambridge went into the race as reigning champions, having beaten Oxford by 3 1/2 lengths in the previous year's race, and held the overall lead, with 63 victories to Oxford's 51 (excluding the "dead heat" of 1877).

The first Women's Boat Race took place in 1927, but did not become an annual fixture until the 1960s. Until 2014, the contest was conducted as part of the Henley Boat Races, but as of the 2015 race, it is held on the River Thames, on the same day as the men's main and reserve races. The reserve race, contested between Oxford's Isis boat and Cambridge's Goldie boat has been held since 1965. It usually takes place on the Tideway, prior to the main Boat Race.

The race was umpired by Alastair Graham who had rowed for Oxford, while the timekeepers for the race were Dickie Burnell and G. G. H. Page. Oxford's coach was Derek Drury while Cambridge were led by Lou Barry.

== Crews ==
The Cambridge crew weighed an average of 13 st 9 lb (86.5 kg), 2.5 pounds (1.1 kg) per rower more than their opponents. At 15 st 11 lb, Cambridge's number four David Cruttenden was the heaviest oarsman to have ever participated in the race, half a stone heavier than American rower Josh Jensen who rowed for Oxford in the 1967 race. Cambridge's Robin Winckless and Nick Hornsby were rowing in their third Boat Race, while Chris Powell and Graeme Hall were also returning Light Blues. Peter Saltmarsh returned for Oxford, making his third appearance in the event. Australian Ashton Calvert, the Oxford cox, was the only non-British competitor registered in the race.

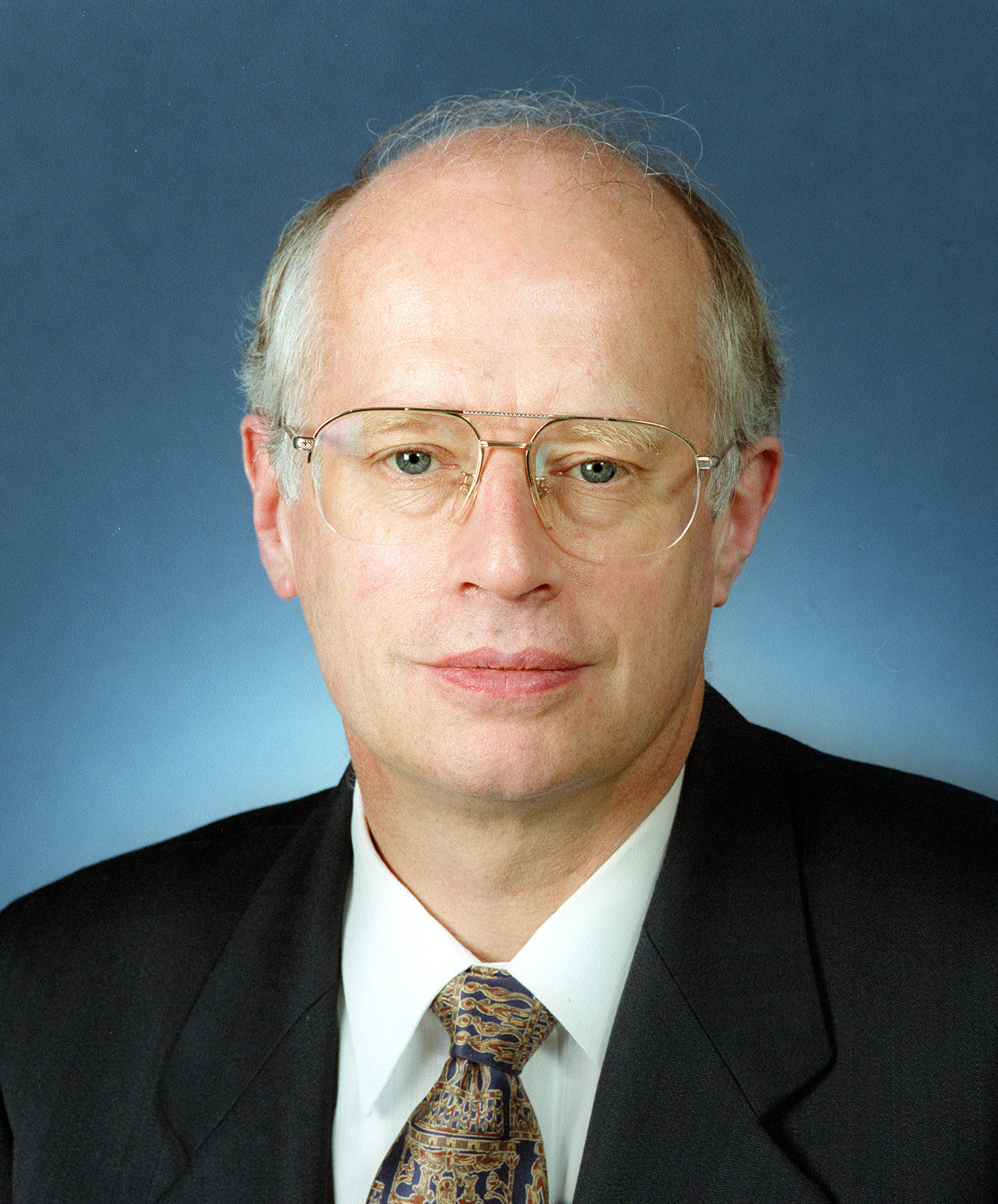
The Australian Ashton Calvert (pictured in 1998) coxed Oxford's crew.

Seat	Oxford			Cambridge		
Seat	Name	College	Weight	Name	College	Weight
Bow	F. J. L. Dale	Keble	13 st 4 lb	C. Robson	Clare	11 st 9 lb
2	K. M. Gee	Worcester	12 st 4 lb	R. N. Winckless (P)	Fitzwilliam	13 st 13 lb
3	D. M. Higgs	Balliol	13 st 5 lb	C. W. Daws	1st & 3rd Trinity	13 st 4 lb
4	H. P. Matheson	Keble	14 st 8 lb	D. L. Cruttenden	St Catharine's	15 st 11 lb
5	J. M. Duncan	Keble	13 st 10 lb	C. S. Powell	Downing	14 st 12 lb
6	W. R. C. Lonsdale	Keble	13 st 10 lb	N. J. Hornsby	Trinity Hall	14 st 9 lb
7	N. D. C. Tee	Balliol	12 st 0 lb	T. M. Redfern	Fitzwillam	13 st 2 lb
Stroke	P. G. Saltmarsh (P)	Keble	13 st 12 lb	G. F. Hall	Downing	11 st 12 lb
Cox	A. T. Calvert	New College	9 st 0 lb	C. B. Murtough	Fitzwilliam	8 st 6 lb
Source: (P) – Boat club president

== Race ==
The Championship Course along which the Boat Race is contested

Cambridge won the toss and elected to start from the Surrey station. With helicopters hovering above the start, Douglas Calder of The Times reported that it was unlikely that either the crews could hear the umpire nor the umpire hear the crews at the start; instead just the flag dropping notified the strokes of the start. Cambridge took an early lead, and their advantage was compounded when the umpire warned Oxford at Beverley Brook to move away to avoid a clash of oars. Cambridge were two seconds ahead at the Mile Post; through rough water, the Light Blue boat coped better and extended their lead to six seconds ahead at Hammersmith Bridge, and at least a length clear of Oxford. While the conditions improved beyond Hammersmith, Cambridge continued to extend their lead, and held an advantage of eight seconds ahead at Chiswick Steps, increasing to eleven seconds ahead at Barnes Bridge. Cambridge won by four lengths and 14 seconds, in a time of 18 minutes 4 seconds, the third fastest time in the history of the event on the Championship Course, bettered only in the 1934 and 1948 races. Oxford's coach Derek Drury was philosophical in defeat: "That's the way the cookie crumbles."

In the reserve race, Cambridge's Goldie beat Oxford's Isis by two lengths and in a time of 18 minutes 50 seconds, in their third consecutive victory. In the 24th running of the Women's Boat Race, Cambridge triumphed, their seventh consecutive victory.
