= Campbell Johnston =

Australian rower

Sport
- Sport: Rowing
- Club: Melbourne University Boat Club
Medal record
Men's rowing
Representing Australia
World Rowing Championships
Gold medal – first place	1974 Lucerne	Lwt men's four
Bronze medal – third place	1975 Nottingham	Lwt men's four

T. Campbell Johnston is an Australian former lightweight rower. He won Australia's first rowing World Championship title – a gold medal at the 1974 World Rowing Championships in Lucerne in the lightweight men's coxless four.

== Club and state rowing ==
Johnston's senior rowing was with the Melbourne University Boat Club. At the Australian Rowing Championships in 1972 he won a national championship title in the lightweight eight.

Johnston was selected in Victorian state representative lightweight fours to race the Penrith Cup at the Australian Rowing Championships for six consecutive years from 1970 to 1975. Those crews won the interstate championship on five consecutive occasions from 1971 to 1975 with Johnston as stroke.

== National representative rowing ==
Johnston was selected for Australian representative honours in a lightweight coxless four for the 1974 World Rowing Championships in Lucerne. That crew with Johnston at stroke won Australia's first gold medal at a FISA World Rowing Championship.

The following year at Nottingham 1975 that same crew were selected to defend their title. They came third, taking the bronze medal and were the best performing Australian crew at those championships. They became the first Australian crew to win successive medals at any world championships or FISA championships.

== Post rowing career ==
After rowing, Johnston worked as a lawyer, starting a practice with his rowing teammate Geoff Rees.
