= Neumeister =

Neumeister is a German surname. Notable people with the surname include:

- Alexander Neumeister (born 1941), German industrial designer from Berlin
- Ed Neumeister (born 1952), American jazz musician
- Erdmann Neumeister (1671–1756), German Lutheran pastor and hymnologist
- Frank Neumeister, German rowing cox
- Jörn Neumeister (born 1987), German footballer
- Karl Neumeister (1903–1990), Austrian equestrian
- Max Neumeister (1849–1929), German forestry scientist
- Otto C. Neumeister (1866–1938), American politician
- Wolf Neumeister (1897–1984), German screenwriter
