= Knapek =

Knapek is a Slavic masculine surname. In Czech its feminine counterpart is Knapková. The surname may refer to:

- Edina Knapek (born 1977), Hungarian fencer
- Miroslava Knapková (born 1980), Czech Olympic rower
- Miroslav Knapek (born 1955), Czech Olympic rower, father of Mirka
