= David Harmon =

David Harmon may refer to:

- David Harman, American lightweight rower (sometimes listed as Harmon)
- David Harmon (wrestler) (born 1967), Irish Olympic wrestler
- David P. Harmon (1919–2001), American scenarist and producer
