= Brian Love =

Brian Love may refer to:

- Brian Love (rower), Canadian rower
- Brian M. Love, American actor, singer, puppeteer, and martial artist
