= Brian Fentiman =

British rower (1947–2019)

Personal information
- Born: First quarter 1947 London
- Died: 20 April 2019 (aged 72)

Sport
- Sport: Rowing
- Club: Quintin Boat Club; London Rowing Club
Medal record
Men's rowing
Representing Great Britain
World Rowing Championships
Silver medal – second place	1976 Villach	Lwt eight
Bronze medal – third place	1975 Nottingham	Lwt eight

Brian Fentiman (1947 – 20 April 2019) was a lightweight rower who competed for Great Britain.

== Rowing career ==
Fentiman was part of the eight that won the 1973 British Rowing Championships for the Quintin Boat Club. He was selected by Great Britain as part of the lightweight eight that secured a bronze medal at the 1975 World Rowing Championships. The following year he was part of the lightweight eight that secured a silver medal at the 1976 World Rowing Championships in Villach, Austria.
