= Christopher George (rower) =

British rower

Sport
- Sport: Rowing
- Club: London RC Thames Rowing Club University of London Boat Club
Medal record
Men's rowing
Representing Great Britain
World Rowing Championships
Gold medal – first place	1977 Amsterdam	Lwt eight
Bronze medal – third place	1975 Nottingham	Lwt eight

Christopher George is a retired lightweight rower who competed for Great Britain.

== Rowing career ==
George was part of the lightweight eight that secured a bronze medal at the 1975 World Rowing Championships. The following year he was part of the lightweight coxless four at the 1976 World Rowing Championships in Villach, Austria, the crew finished 11th overall after a fifth-place finish in the B final.

George won a gold medal at the 1977 World Rowing Championships in Amsterdam with the lightweight men's eight.

George has won the Henley Royal Regatta four times; three times with the University of London Boat Club where he won the Ladies' Challenge Plate in 1971, the Visitors' Challenge Cup in 1972 and the Stewards' Challenge Cup in 1973, and once with London Rowing Club where he won the Thames Challenge Cup in 1977.
