= Dieter Meschede =

German physicist and rower

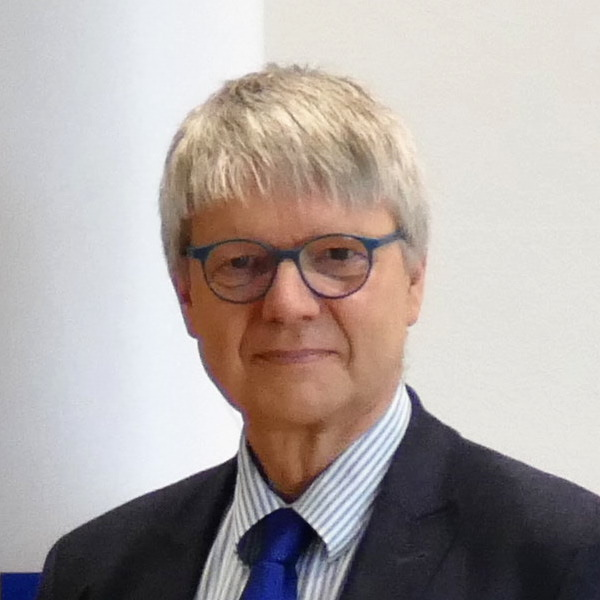

Personal information
- Born: 17 April 1954 (age 72)

Sport
- Sport: Rowing
Medal record
Men's rowing
Representing West Germany
World Rowing Championships
Gold medal – first place	1976 Villach	Lwt eight

Dieter Meschede (born 17 April 1954) is a German physicist and lightweight rower.

Meschede was born in 1954 in Lathen in the Emsland district.

Meschede won a gold medal at the 1976 World Rowing Championships in Villach with the lightweight men's eight.

Meschede studied physics and in 1989, he was the inaugural recipient of the Rudolf Kaiser Prize, awarded to young promising scientists. In 2007, he was awarded the Robert Wichard Pohl Prize. He teaches quantum technology at the University of Bonn. He was the president of the Deutsche Physikalische Gesellschaft and held this position from 2018 for a two-year period until 2020.

Since the 21st edition (published in 2002), Meschede has been the editor of the German physics textbook Gerthsen Physik.
