= The Boat Race 1974 =

120th Boat Race
- Date: 6 April 1974
- Winner: Oxford
- Margin of victory: 5 1/2 lengths
- Winning time: 17 minutes 35 seconds
- Overall record (Cambridge–Oxford): 67–52
- Umpire: W. G. R. M. Laurie (Cambridge)

Other races
- Reserve winner: Goldie
- Women's winner: Cambridge

The 120th Boat Race took place on 6 April 1974. Held annually, the Boat Race is a side-by-side rowing race between crews from the Universities of Oxford and Cambridge along the River Thames. It was won by Oxford who passed the finishing post 5 1/2 lengths ahead of Cambridge, in a winning time of 17 minutes 35 seconds, the fastest in the history of the race, beating the existing record set in the 1948 race. It was umpired by Ran Laurie.

In the reserve race, Goldie beat Isis, and in the Women's Boat Race, Cambridge were victorious.

== Background ==
The Boat Race is a side-by-side rowing competition between the University of Oxford (sometimes referred to as the "Dark Blues") and the University of Cambridge (sometimes referred to as the "Light Blues"). First held in 1829, the race takes place on the 4.2-mile (6.8 km) Championship Course on the River Thames in southwest London. The rivalry is a major point of honour between the two universities and followed throughout the United Kingdom and broadcast worldwide. Cambridge went into the race as reigning champions, having beaten Oxford by a thirteen lengths in the previous year's race. Cambridge held the overall lead, with 67 victories to Oxford's 51 (excluding the "dead heat" of 1877).

The first Women's Boat Race took place in 1927, but did not become an annual fixture until the 1960s. Up until 2014, the contest was conducted as part of the Henley Boat Races, but as of the 2015 race, it is held on the River Thames, on the same day as the men's main and reserve races. The reserve race, contested between Oxford's Isis boat and Cambridge's Goldie boat has been held since 1965. It usually takes place on the Tideway, prior to the main Boat Race.

During preparation for the race, both crews were defeated on the Thames by the Lubrication Laboratory boat from Imperial College London. Jim Railton, writing in The Times was not impressed: "It has already been well established that there are no top class crews in this ... Boat Race. Each day on the Tideway in the final days of training have simply produced more negatives". Cambridge also lost twice in short races against their reserve crew Goldie, whom Oxford had defeated at the Reading University Head of the River Race by eight seconds. In appalling conditions, Cambridge won an interrupted race against a Barclays Bank crew. Meanwhile, Oxford defeated a "motley eight" from Tideway Scullers School by four lengths along the full course. Oxford's finishing coach was Daniel Topolski (who had rowed for the Dark Blues in the 1967 and 1968 races) while Cambridge were guided by British Olympic rower David Jennens (who had rowed for the Light Blues in the 1949, 1950 and 1951 races), and the race was umpired by Ran Laurie, who had rowed for Cambridge in the 1934, 1935 and 1936 races.

== Crews ==
The Cambridge crew was marginally heavier than their opponents, weighing an average of 13 st 5.25 lb (84.7 kg), 0.25 pounds (0.1 kg) per rower more than Oxford. Oxford saw four Blues return to their crew, Nick Tee, Sam Nevin, Dennis Payne and American Olympian David Sawyier, while Cambridge welcomed back two – Ben Duncan and Howard Jacobs.

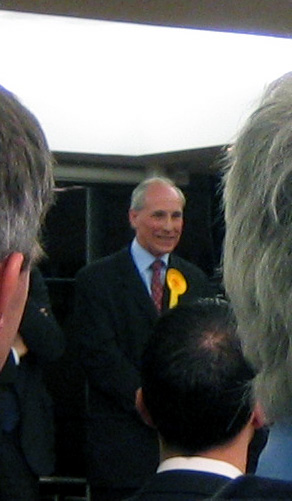
David Rendel (pictured in 2005) rowed at number three for Oxford.

| Seat | Oxford | | | Cambridge | | |
| Seat | Name | College | Weight | Name | College | Weight |
|---|---|---|---|---|---|---|
| Bow | N. D. C. Tee | Balliol | 12 st 1 lb | R. P. B. Duncan (P) | St Catharine's | 13 st 8 lb |
| 2 | G. S. Innes | Oriel | 13 st 2 lb | H. R. Jacobs | Pembroke | 13 st 6 lb |
| 3 | D. Rendel | St Cross | 13 st 10 lb | D. J. Walker | Clare | 13 st 9 lb |
| 4 | S. D. Nevin | Christ Church | 13 st 13 lb | D. B. Sprague | Emmanuel | 13 st 2 lb |
| 5 | P. G. P. Stoddart | University | 13 st 6 lb | J. H. Smith | Gonville & Caius | 14 st 12 lb |
| 6 | P. J. Marsden | Lincoln | 13 st 6 lb | J. H. Clay | Pembroke | 13 st 4 lb |
| 7 | D. R. Payne | Balliol | 13 st 5 lb | T. F. Yuncken | Pembroke | 12 st 12 lb |
| Stroke | D. R. Sawyier (P) | Christ Church | 14 st 2 lb | N. C. A. Bradley | Pembroke | 12 st 3 lb |
| Cox | G. E. Morris | Oriel | 8 st 12 lb | H. J. H. Wheare | Jesus | 8 st 11 lb |
Sources: (P) – Boat club president

== Race ==
The Championship Course along which the Boat Race is contested

Cambridge won the toss and elected to start from the Middlesex station. Oxford took an early lead with their stroke Sawyier making a good start. Despite this, by the Mile Post, Oxford were just one-third of a length clear, and while Cambridge's stroke rate was lower than their Dark Blue opposition, they remained in contention. By Hammersmith Bridge, Oxford held a two-length lead, and despite favourable wind and ride, Cambridge failed to respond. At Chiswick Steps, the lead had extended to four lengths and by Barnes Bridge it was five. Oxford passed the finishing post in a record-breaking time of 17 minutes 35 seconds, breaking the existing record from the 1948 race, 5 1/2 lengths clear of the Light Blues. Railton commented: "Tideway records reflect conditions more than comparisons with previous Boat Race crews" but noted "considering the slow conditions ... Oxford's performance must have been particularly inspired." The winning time was two seconds faster than the best time over the course, set by Oxford in practice in 1965, and 15 seconds quicker than the race record, set in the 1948 race by Cambridge.

In the reserve race, Cambridge's Goldie beat Oxford's Isis by five lengths, their seventh consecutive victory. In the 28th running of the Women's Boat Race, Cambridge triumphed, their eleventh consecutive victory.
