= Kim Rørbæk =

Danish rower

Personal information
- Nationality: Danish
- Born: 11 December 1948 (age 76)

Sport
- Sport: Rowing

Kim Rørbæk (born 11 December 1948) is a Danish rower. He competed in the men's coxless pair event at the 1976 Summer Olympics.
