= Bent Fransson =

Danish rower

Personal information
- Born: 21 March 1951 (age 75)

Sport
- Sport: Rowing
Medal record
Men's rowing
Representing Denmark
World Championships
Gold medal – first place	1981 Munich	Lwt eight
Silver medal – second place	1982 Lucerne	Lwt eight
Bronze medal – third place	1976 Villach	Lwt four
Bronze medal – third place	1983 Duisburg	Lwt eight
Bronze medal – third place	1986 Nottingham	Lwt eight

Bent Fransson (born 21 March 1951) is a Danish former lightweight rower and rowing coach. He won a gold medal at the 1981 World Rowing Championships in Munich with the lightweight men's eight and was the stroke of several strong Danish lightweight international crews in the 1980s.

Fransson also coached many top Danish lightweight crews, including the straight fours that won Gold at the 2008 Summer Olympics, Bronze at the 2012 Summer Olympics, and Silver at the 2016 Summer Olympics. Fransson was the World Rowing Coach of the Year in 2014. He retired from coaching in 2016.
