= Hans-Ludwig Zimmer =

German rower

Personal information
- Born: 2 February 1950 (age 76)

Sport
- Sport: Rowing
Medal record
Men's rowing
Representing West Germany
World Rowing Championships
Gold medal – first place	1976 Villach	Lwt eight

Hans-Ludwig Zimmer (born 2 February 1950) is a German lightweight rower. He won a gold medal at the 1976 World Rowing Championships in Villach with the lightweight men's eight.
