= Christopher Drury =

British lightweight rower

Personal information
- Born: 22 June 1952 (age 74) Westminster, London

Sport
- Sport: Rowing
- Club: Leander Club; London RC
Medal record
Men's rowing
Representing Great Britain
World Championships
Gold medal – first place	1977 Amsterdam	Lwt eight
Gold medal – first place	1978 Copenhagen	Lwt eight
Silver medal – second place	1975 Nottingham	Lwt four
Silver medal – second place	1976 Villach	Lwt eight

Christopher Mark Drury (born 22 June 1952) is a retired British international lightweight rower.

== Rowing career ==
Drury participated in the 1974 World Rowing Championships in Lucerne, competing in the lightweight coxless four event. The crew selected from the Leander Club finished in seventh place overall after winning the B final. In 1975 as part of the lightweight four with Graeme Hall, Nicholas Tee and Daniel Topolski they won a silver medal for Great Britain at the 1975 World Rowing Championships in Nottingham. He was part of the lightweight eight that secured a silver medal at the 1976 World Rowing Championships in Villach, Austria.

He won a gold medal at the 1977 World Rowing Championships in Amsterdam with the lightweight men's eight. The following year he was part of the lightweight eight that successfully defended their title and won the gold medal at the 1978 FISA Lightweight Championships in Copenhagen.
