= Calvin Coffey =

American rower (born 1951)

Personal information
- Full name: Calvin Thomas Coffey
- Born: January 27, 1951 (age 75) Norwich, Connecticut, U.S.
Medal record
Men's rowing
Representing the United States
Olympic Games
Silver medal – second place	1976 Montreal	Coxless pair

Calvin Thomas Coffey (born January 27, 1951) is an American rower who competed in the 1976 Summer Olympics. He was born in Norwich, Connecticut. In 1976, he and his partner Mike Staines won the silver medal in the coxless pairs event.

More recently, Calvin Coffey survived a life-threatening car crash.

Calvin Coffey was the maker of CTC racing shells, and pioneered the use of composite materials in rowing equipment.
