= Ross Blomfield =

New Zealand rower

Sport
- Sport: Rowing
Medal record
Men's rowing
Representing New Zealand
World Rowing Championships
| Bronze medal – third place | 1974 Lucerne | Eight |

Ross Blomfield is a retired New Zealand rower. He won a bronze medal with the men's eight at the 1974 World Rowing Championships at Rotsee in Lucerne, Switzerland.
