= Vojtěch Caska =

Czech rower

Personal information
- Nationality: Czech
- Born: 20 April 1954 (age 70); Malhostovice, Czechoslovakia

Sport
- Sport: Rowing

Vojtěch Caska (born 20 April 1954) is a Czech rower. He competed at the 1976 Summer Olympics and the 1980 Summer Olympics.
