= Richard Grogan =

American rower

Personal information
- Born: 1953 or 1954 (age 72–73)
- Education: Harvard University (1975)

Sport
- Sport: Rowing
Medal record
Men's rowing
Representing United States
World Rowing Championships
Gold medal – first place	1974 Lucerne	Lwt eight

Richard H. Grogan Jr. (born November 1953) is an American lightweight rower and stroke of the United States crew. He won a gold medal at the 1974 World Rowing Championships in Lucerne with the lightweight men's eight.

== Biography ==
Grogan was a native of Wellesley Hills, Massachusetts. In September 1974, he was a student at Harvard University. While there, he sat stroke position in the university's heavyweight rowing team, winning the 1975 Harvard–Yale Regatta varsity race. He graduated from Harvard in 1975, and was inducted into the Harvard Varsity Club Hall of Fame in 1999.

He graduated from Harvard Business School in 1979 and later worked as a senior partner at the London office of Bain & Company. He co-founded the company Talisman Management in 1987.

Grogan was a close friend of Joseph P. Kennedy II, having assisted him in running the successful 1976 senate campaign for his uncle Ted Kennedy.

=== Personal life ===
According to Joseph P. Kennedy II, Grogan married a French art historian named Odile Claude Emelie Basch in 1981 before moving to London.
