= Henry Wheare =

British rower and attorney (born 1952)

Personal information
- Born: October 1952 (age 73)

Sport
- Sport: Rowing
Medal record
Men's rowing
Representing Great Britain
World Rowing Championships
Silver medal – second place	1976 Villach	Lwt eight

Henry Jeremy Hugh Wheare (born 1952) is a retired coxswain who competed for Great Britain and practices intellectual property law in Hong Kong.

== Rowing career ==
Wheare was the cox of the losing Cambridge boat in the 1974 Boat Race (won by Oxford in record time), and cox of the 1972 Head of the River crews of Jesus College Boat Club (Cambridge).

He coxed the winning 1974 Henley Regatta Prince Philip Challenge Cup crew for Lady Margaret & First & Third Trinity Boat Club.

He was selected by Great Britain as cox of the lightweight eight that secured a silver medal at the 1976 World Rowing Championships in Villach, Austria.

== Legal career ==
After a degree in law at Cambridge, Wheare practiced intellectual property law as a solicitor and UK patent attorney in London. He moved to Hong Kong in 1985, where he was from 1991 to 1997 president of the Hong Kong Group of the Asian Patent Attorneys Association (APAA) and a vice-president of APAA (2018–2023).

== Personal life ==
He is the youngest son of the distinguished academic Sir Kenneth Wheare, former vice-chancellor of the University of Oxford, and brother of Tom Wheare, former headmaster of Bryanston School
