= Nichola Tee =

British rower

Personal information
- Born: Nicholas David Capon Tee; Third quarter 1949 (age 76–77) Pontypridd, Glamorganshire, Wales
- Education: Balliol College, Oxford

Sport
- Country: Great Britain
- Sport: Rowing
- Club: Oxford University Boat Club; Leander Club
Medal record
Men's rowing
Representing Great Britain
World Rowing Championships
Silver medal – second place	1975 Nottingham	Lwt four
Representing Great Britain
The Boat Race
Gold medal – first place	The Boat Race 1974	Oxford
Silver medal – second place	The Boat Race 1969	Oxford
Silver medal – second place	The Boat Race 1970	Oxford
Silver medal – second place	The Boat Race 1975	Oxford

Nichola Tee (born third quarter of 1949 in Pontypridd), an alumnus of Balliol College, Oxford, is a retired British international rower.

== Rowing career ==
Tee participated in the 1974 World Rowing Championships in Lucerne, competing in the lightweight coxless four event. The crew selected from the Leander Club finished in seventh place overall after winning the B final.

She competed in four Boat Races for Oxford, and was a member of the winning crew in the 1974 rowing in the bow position. In 1975 as part of the lightweight four with Graeme Hall, Christopher Drury and Daniel Topolski she won a silver medal for Great Britain at the 1975 World Rowing Championships in Nottingham.
