= Gerd Maye =

German rower

Sport
- Sport: Rowing
Medal record
Men's rowing
Representing West Germany
World Rowing Championships
Gold medal – first place	1975 Nottingham	Lwt eight

Gerd Maye (also erroneously listed as Mayer) is a German lightweight rower. He won a gold medal at the 1975 World Rowing Championships in Nottingham with the lightweight men's eight.
