= Mogens Rasmussen =

Danish rower

Personal information
- Nationality: Danish
- Born: 18 January 1953 (age 72)

Sport
- Sport: Rowing

Mogens Rasmussen (born 18 January 1953) is a Danish rower. He competed in the men's coxless pair event at the 1976 Summer Olympics.
