= Peter van Roye =

German rower (born 1950)

Medal record

Men's rowing

Representing West Germany

Olympic Games
Bronze medal – third place	1976 Montreal	Coxless pair

World Rowing Championships
Bronze medal – third place	1974 Lucerne	Coxless four

Peter van Roye (born 30 May 1950) is a German rower who competed for West Germany in the 1976 Summer Olympics.

He was born in Lingen. In 1976 he and his partner Thomas Strauß won the bronze medal in the coxless pairs event.
