= Eric Aserlind =

American rower

Sport
- Sport: Rowing
Medal record
Men's rowing
Representing the United States
World Championships
Gold medal – first place	1974 Lucerne	Lwt eight
Silver medal – second place	1975 Nottingham	Lwt eight

Eric Aserlind is an American lightweight rower. He won a gold medal at the 1974 World Rowing Championships in Lucerne with the lightweight men's eight.

Aserlind is from Madison, Wisconsin. He was inducted into the U.S. Rowing Hall of Fame in 1986.
