= Mike Staines =

American rower (born 1949)

Personal information
- Born: May 30, 1949 (age 77)
Medal record
Olympic Games
Men's rowing
Silver medal – second place	1976 Montreal	Coxless pair

Michael "Mike" Laurence Staines (born May 30, 1949) is an American rower who competed in the 1972 Summer Olympics and in the 1976 Summer Olympics.

He was born in Guildford, Great Britain. He is the ex-husband of Laura Staines.

In 1972 he was a crew member of the American boat which finished eleventh in the coxed pair event.

Four years later he and his partner Calvin Coffey won the silver medal in the coxless pairs competition.
