= Gennadi Kinko =

Soviet rower

Personal information
- Nationality: Russian
- Born: 28 October 1942 Turmyshi, Russian SFSR, Soviet Union
- Died: 6 December 2007 (aged 65) Tartu, Estonia

Sport
- Sport: Rowing

Gennadi Kinko (28 October 1942 – 6 December 2007) was an Estonian rower. He competed in the men's coxless pair event at the 1976 Summer Olympics.
