= Richard Ewing =

American rower

Sport
- Sport: Rowing
Medal record
Men's rowing
Representing United States
World Championships
| Gold medal – first place | 1974 Lucerne | Lwt eight |

Richard T. Ewing is an American lightweight rower. He won a gold medal at the 1974 World Rowing Championships in Lucerne with the lightweight men's eight.
