= Gavin Stoddart =

British rower

Personal information
- Full name: Peter Gavin Pilditch Stoddart
- Nationality: British
- Born: 1953; Winchester, England

Sport
- Sport: Rowing

Peter Gavin Pilditch Stoddart (born 1953) is a British retired rower.

== Rowing career ==
Stoddart rowed for the winning Oxford crew at the 1974 Boat Race, representing the University College Boat Club (Oxford) he rowed from seat 5. In 1976, he was part of the lightweight coxless four at the 1976 World Rowing Championships in Villach, Austria, the crew finished 11th overall after a fifth-place finish in the B final.

== Personal life ==
In 1977 he qualified as a doctor from St Thomas' Hospital and then trained as a radiologist from 1980 to 1985.
