= Stewart Fraser (rower) =

British rower

Sport
- Sport: Rowing
Medal record
Men's rowing
Representing Great Britain
World Rowing Championships
Silver medal – second place	1976 Villach	Lwt eight
Bronze medal – third place	1975 Nottingham	Lwt eight

Stewart Fraser is a retired lightweight rower who competed for Great Britain.

== Rowing career ==
Fraser was selected by Great Britain as part of the lightweight eight that secured a bronze medal at the 1975 World Rowing Championships and the following year he was part of the lightweight eight that secured a silver medal at the 1976 World Rowing Championships in Villach, Austria.
