= Pål Børnick =

Norwegian rower (born 1955)

Medal record

Representing Norway

Men's rowing

World Championships
Gold medal – first place	1978 Copenhagen	Lwt double sculls
Gold medal – first place	1979 Bled	Lwt double sculls
Silver medal – second place	1976 Villach	Lwt coxless four

Pål Børnick (born 3 November 1955) is a Norwegian competition rower and twice World Champion.

== Life and career ==
Børnick was born on 3 November 1955.

He received a silver medal in lightweight coxless fours at the 1976 World Rowing Championships in Villach, Austria. The team consisted of Edd Hillstad, Per Arvid Steen, Ivar Sølberg and Børnick.

Børnick won a gold medal in lightweight double sculls at the 1978 FISA Lightweight Championships in Copenhagen, together with Arne Gilje. While the main championship was held in Cambridge, New Zealand, the lightweight championship was held in Copenhagen, Denmark.

Gilje and Børnick won a second gold medal at the 1979 World Championships in Lake Bled, Yugoslavia.

He resides at Geilo.
