= 1976 World Rowing Championships =

International rowing event

- Venue: Lake Ossiach
- Location: Villach, Austria
- Dates: 14–16 August

The 1976 World Rowing Championships were World Rowing Championships that were held in August 1976 at Villach in Austria. Since 1976 was an Olympic year for rowing, the World Championships did not include the 14 Olympic classes scheduled for the 1976 Summer Olympics. Only three lightweight men's events were scheduled, and all finals were raced on 16 August.

== Medal summary ==
Medalists at the 1976 World Rowing Championships were:

=== Men's lightweight events ===
| Event: | Gold: | Time | Silver: | Time | Bronze: | Time |
|---|---|---|---|---|---|---|
| LM1x | Austria; Raimund Haberl | 07:18.18 | Denmark; Morten Espersen | 07:19.48 | France; Roland Weill | 07:22.90 |
| LM4- | France; André Picard; Michel Picard; André Coupat; Francis Pelegri | 06:29.94 | Norway; Pål Børnick; Olaf Solberg; Per Arne Steen; Edd Hillstad | 06:34.35 | Denmark; Djon Andersen; Bent Fransson; Aage Hansen; Torben Hansen | 06:36.04 |
| LM8+ | West Germany; Peter Werner; Hans-Ludwig Zimmer; Hans-Josef Büsken; Jürgen Nentwig; Lutz Neubert; Dieter Meschede; Peter Huck; Bernd Nehmer; Helmut Sassenbach (cox) | 06:05.00 | Great Britain; Graeme Hall; Nigel Read; Christopher Drury; Colin Cusack; Stewart Fraser; Mark Harris; Brian Fentiman; Doug Carpenter; Henry Wheare (cox) | 06:06.81 | United States; Bruce Stone; Andrew Washburn; Craig Drake; Thomas Cook; John Dunn; Ralph Nauman; Scott Roop; Sean Colgan; Joseph O'Connor (cox) | 06:09.16 |

== Finals ==
| Event | 1st | 2nd | 3rd | 4th | 5th | 6th |
|---|---|---|---|---|---|---|
| LM1x | Austria | Denmark | France | United States | Mexico | Netherlands |
| LM4- | France | Norway | Denmark | Switzerland | Netherlands | Sweden |
| LM8+ | West Germany | Great Britain | United States | Netherlands | Canada | Sweden |

== Great Britain ==
| Event | | Notes |
|---|---|---|
| LM1x | Peter Zeun | 3rd in B Final |
| L4- | Paul Stuart-Bennett, Alastair Logie, Gavin Stoddart, Christopher George | 5th in B Final |
| L8 | Graeme Hall, Nigel Read, Christopher Drury, Colin Cusack, Stewart Fraser; Mark Harris, Brian Fentiman, Doug Carpenter, Henry Wheare (cox) | silver medal in A Final |
