= Arne Gilje =

Norwegian rower (born 1956)

Personal information
- Born: 22 December 1956 (age 69)
Medal record
Men's rowing
Representing Norway
World Championships
Gold medal – first place	1978 Copenhagen	Lwt double sculls
Gold medal – first place	1979 Bled	Lwt double sculls

Arne Gilje (born 22 December 1956) is a retired Norwegian competition rower and twice World Champion.

He won a gold medal in lightweight double sculls at the 1978 World Rowing Championships in Copenhagen, together with Pål Børnick. held in Copenhagen, Denmark.

Gilje and Børnick won a second gold medal in lightweight double sculls at the 1979 World Championships in Lake Bled, Yugoslavia. In 1977 they became unofficial world champions in the world championship held in Amsterdam.

Arne Gilje was representing Stavanger Roklub and became national champion in lightweight single sculls in 1976, 1979 and 1980, coxless four in 1978. Awarded the Norwegian king's trophy for the championship in 1979.
