= Thomas Strauß =

German rower (born 1953)

Olympic medal record

Men's rowing
Bronze medal – third place	1976 Montreal	Coxless pair

Thomas Strauß (born 15 December 1953) is a German rower who competed for West Germany in the 1976 Summer Olympics.

In 1976 he and his partner Peter van Roye won the bronze medal in the coxless pairs event.
