= Peter Huck =

German rower

Personal information
- Born: 10 June 1955 (age 71)

Sport
- Sport: Rowing
Medal record
Men's rowing
Representing West Germany
World Rowing Championships
Gold medal – first place	1976 Villach	Lwt eight

Peter Huck (born 10 June 1955) is a German lightweight rower. He won a gold medal at the 1976 World Rowing Championships in Villach with the lightweight men's eight.
