= Helmut Sassenbach =

German coxswain (born 1959)

Personal information
- Born: 31 January 1959 (age 67)

Sport
- Sport: Rowing
Medal record
Men's rowing
Representing West Germany
World Rowing Championships
Gold medal – first place	1976 Villach	Lwt eight
Silver medal – second place	1977 Amsterdam	Coxed four
Silver medal – second place	1978 Cambridge	Coxed four

Helmut Sassenbach (born 31 January 1959) is a German coxswain. He won a gold medal at the 1976 World Rowing Championships in Villach with the lightweight men's eight.
