= Doug Carpenter (rower) =

British rower

Personal information
- Born: Douglas Carpenter
- Died: 3 July 2011 London

Sport
- Sport: Rowing
- Club: Kingston Rowing Club; Leander Club; London Rowing Club; Quintin Boat Club
Medal record
Men's rowing
Representing Great Britain
World Rowing Championships
Silver medal – second place	1976 Villach	Lwt eight

Douglas Carpenter (date of birth unknown-2011) was a lightweight rower who competed for Great Britain.

== Rowing career ==
Carpenter was part of the lightweight eight that secured a silver medal at the 1976 World Rowing Championships in Villach, Austria.

In 1972 rowed for the Kingston Rowing Club in the final of the Thames Challenge Cup. He died in 2011.
