= Women's Boat Race 1975 =

30th Women's Boat Race
- Date: 13 March 1975
- Winner: Cambridge
- Margin of victory: Five lengths
- Winning time: 4 minutes 7 seconds
- Overall record (Cambridge–Oxford): 20–10

The 30th Women's Boat Race took place on 13 March 1975. The contest was between crews from the Universities of Oxford and Cambridge and held on the River Cam.

== Background ==
The first Women's Boat Race was conducted on The Isis in 1927.

== Crews ==
Cambridge's crew included five Blues while Oxford saw three rowers with Boat Race experience return.

Seat	Oxford		Cambridge	
Seat	Name	College	Name	College
Bow	E. Ingenhousz	New Hall	K. Nowatz	Somerville
2	J. Huber	New Hall	B. Mather (P)	St Hugh's
3	N. Boyes	Clare	S. Dixon	Somerville
4	S. Clarke (P)	Newnham	A. Bartoft	St Hilda's
5	L. Driver	Newnham	S. Dearsley	St Anne's
6	C. Duff	Clare	L. Minoprio	Somerville
7	C. Moss	Newnham	M. Pring-Mill	Lady Margaret Hall
Stroke	S. Visick	Newnham	J. Maggs	St Huhg's
Cox	H. Swallow	Churchill	S. Lauckner	St Hugh's

== Race ==
The race took place on the River Cam. Cambridge won the toss and elected to start on the towpath side of the river. They got off to the better start and were a length ahead after the first minute. Oxford stayed in touch until the Railway Bridge, after which Cambridge pulled further ahead.

The contest was won by Cambridge by five lengths in a time of 4 minutes 7 seconds. The victory took the overall record in the competition to 20–10 in their favour.

== See also ==
- The Boat Race 1975
