= David Sprague (rower) =

British rower

Personal information
- Nationality: British
- Born: 2nd quarter 1952 Newcastle upon Tyne, Northumberland

Sport
- Sport: Rowing
- Club: Durham School; Tyne

David B Sprague (born 1952) is a retired rower who competed for Great Britain.

== Rowing career ==
Sprague rowed for the losing Cambridge crew at the 1974 Boat Race, representing the Emmanuel Boat Club he rowed from seat 4. The following year he was part of the British eight at the 1975 World Rowing Championships in Nottingham, the crew finished 9th overall after a third-place finish in the B final.
