= Guilherme Campos =

Brazilian rower

Personal information
- Nationality: Brazilian
- Born: 24 May 1955 (age 69)

Sport
- Sport: Rowing

Guilherme Campos (born 24 May 1955) is a Brazilian rower. He competed in the men's coxless pair event at the 1976 Summer Olympics.
