= Kari Hanska =

Finnish rower

Personal information
- Nationality: Finnish
- Born: 23 March 1949 (age 76); Porvoo, Finland

Sport
- Sport: Rowing

Kari Hanska (born 23 March 1949) is a Finnish rower. He competed in the men's coxless pair event at the 1976 Summer Olympics.
