= Graeme Hall (rower) =

British rower

Personal information
- Born: 1946
- Died: 5 January 1985 (aged 38–39) Auxerre

Sport
- Sport: Rowing
- Club: Wallingford; Cambridge University Boat Club; Leander Club
Medal record
Men's rowing
Representing Great Britain
World Rowing Championships
Silver medal – second place	1975 Nottingham	Lwt four
Silver medal – second place	1976 Villach	Lwt eight
The Boat Race
Gold medal – first place	The Boat Race 1968	Cambridge
Gold medal – first place	The Boat Race 1969	Cambridge

Graeme Hall (1946 - 5 January 1985) was a retired rower who competed for Great Britain.

== Rowing career ==
Hall rowed for Wallingford Rowing Club in 1967 before going to Cambridge University and rowing stroke for the winning Goldie crew (Cambridge reserve boat) at The Boat Race 1967. The following year he rowed stroke when representing the Downing College Boat Club in The Boat Race 1968 and won with the Cambridge crew stopping Oxford from winning a fourth consecutive race. Hall then won the main race for a second time the following year when Cambridge beat Oxford in The Boat Race 1969.

He became a British champion in 1972 when winning the eights at the 1972 British Rowing Championships. he participated in the 1974 World Rowing Championships in Lucerne, competing in the lightweight coxless four event. The crew selected from the Leander Club finished in seventh place overall after winning the B final.

In 1975 as part of the lightweight four with Nicholas Tee, Christopher Drury and Daniel Topolski they won a silver medal for Great Britain at the 1975 World Rowing Championships in Nottingham. The following year he was part of the lightweight eight that secured a silver medal at the 1976 World Rowing Championships in Villach, Austria.

He coached Cambridge and the British Olympic eights in 1980 and 1984, that won silver in 1984.

Hall coached Downing College Boat Club (DCBC) in 1980. They won their oars by bumping every day in the May Bumps rising from 5th to 2nd. Bumping 1st & 3rd Trinity, Selwyn, Pembroke and Jesus. The highest Downing had ever been at that time. Lady Margaret was then head of Division 1. They then went on to beat Lady Margaret in the Ladies Plate at Henley. The crew consisted of Andrew Dalrymple, Mark Gleave, Pete Cross, Miles Clark, Clive Anderson, Fred Bush, James Bernard, Paul Montford.

== Personal life ==
He was killed in a car crash in France, at Auxerre, on Saturday 5 January 1985, with 28 year old Sally Bloomfield.

They were driving back from a skiing holiday in France, when their car hit a lorry.

His son and daughter were also in the car but not injured.
