= Paul Lutz =

German rower

Sport
- Sport: Rowing
Medal record
Men's rowing
Representing West Germany
World Rowing Championships
| Gold medal – first place | 1975 Nottingham | Lwt eight |
| Bronze medal – third place | 1974 Lucerne | Lwt eight |

Paul Lutz is a German lightweight rower. He won a gold medal at the 1975 World Rowing Championships in Nottingham with the lightweight men's eight.
