= Anthony Stocking =

British rower

Personal information
- Born: First quarter 1951 London, England

Sport
- Sport: Rowing
- Club: Tees Rowing Club
Medal record
Men's rowing
Representing Great Britain
World Rowing Championships
Bronze medal – third place	1975 Nottingham	Lwt eight

Anthony Stocking (born 1951) is a lightweight rower who competed for Great Britain.

== Rowing career ==
Stocking was selected by Great Britain as part of the lightweight eight that secured a bronze medal at the 1975 World Rowing Championships. He continues to row in Masters competition for Tees Rowing Club.
