= Colin Cusack =

British rower

Personal information
- Born: 1950 (age 75–76) Wallingford

Sport
- Sport: Rowing
- Club: Wallingford RC; London RC
Medal record
Men's rowing
Representing Great Britain
World Rowing Championships
Gold medal – first place	1977 Amsterdam	Lwt eight
Silver medal – second place	1976 Villach	Lwt eight
Bronze medal – third place	1980 Hazewinkel	Lwt four

Colin Cusack is a retired British lightweight rower.

== Rowing career ==
Cusack won the coxed pairs with Carl Purchase and the coxless pairs with Tony Richardson, rowing for the Wallingford Rowing Club, at the 1974 National Rowing Championships. He was part of the lightweight eight that secured a silver medal at the 1976 World Rowing Championships in Villach, Austria.

He won a gold medal at the 1977 World Rowing Championships in Amsterdam with the lightweight men's eight. In 1978 he was part of the lightweight coxless four that finished 5th in the A final at the 1978 FISA Lightweight Championships in Copenhagen.

Cusack continued to row in veteran events, earning 15 gold medals with rowing partner Sean Morris and in combination with others at the 2013 World Masters Regatta in Italy.
