= Jürgen Arndt =

German rower

Sport
- Sport: Rowing
- Club: SG Dynamo Potsdam / Sportvereinigung (SV) Dynamo
Medal record
Men's rowing
Representing East Germany
World Rowing Championships
Gold medal – first place	Nottingham 1975	Eight

Jürgen Arndt is a German rower who competed for the SG Dynamo Potsdam / Sportvereinigung (SV) Dynamo.

In 1974, he came third at the East German National Championships with his coxed four team. He also started with the men's eight that year and also came third at the nationals. In 1975, he became East German National Champion with the eight, and the team was nominated for the world championships. At the 1975 World Rowing Championships in Nottingham, the team won the gold medal.

At the 1976 national championships, Arndt came second with the coxed four and third with the eight. At the 1976 national championships, Arndt came second with the men's eight.
