= Lutz Neubert =

German rower

Personal information
- Born: 23 December 1953 (age 72)

Sport
- Sport: Rowing
Medal record
Men's rowing
Representing West Germany
World Rowing Championships
Gold medal – first place	1976 Villach	Lwt eight

Lutz Neubert (born 23 December 1953) is a German lightweight rower. He won a gold medal at the 1976 World Rowing Championships in Villach with the lightweight men's eight.
