= Raúl Bagattini =

Brazilian rower (born 1951)

Personal information
- Nationality: Brazilian
- Born: 20 May 1951 (age 74)

Sport
- Sport: Rowing

Raúl Bagattini (born 20 May 1951) is a Brazilian rower. He competed at the 1972 Summer Olympics and the 1976 Summer Olympics.
