= Willem Boeschoten =

Dutch rower (born 1953)

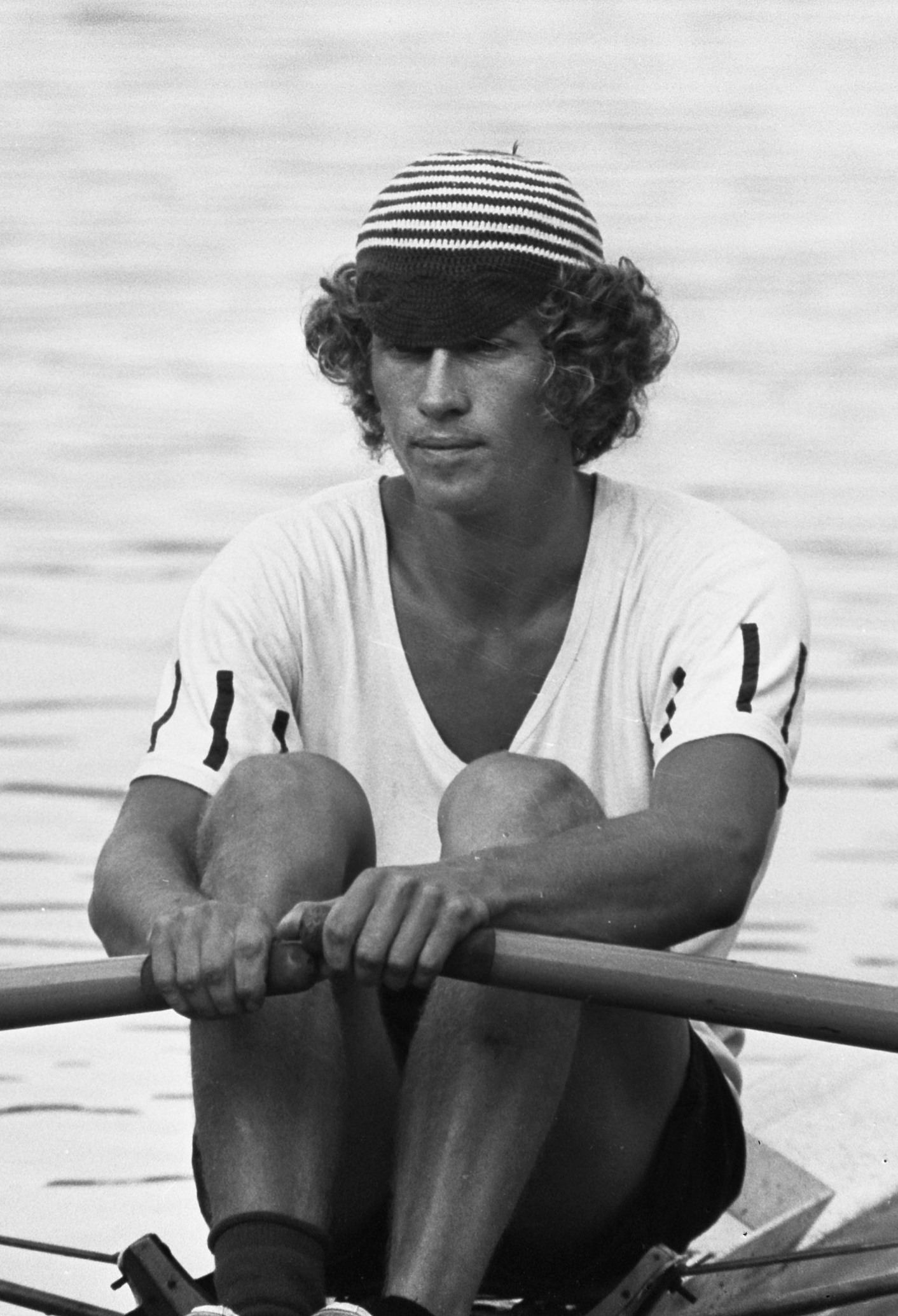
- Willem Boeschoten in 1975

Personal information
- Born: 9 March 1953 (age 73) Hilversum, Netherlands
- Height: 1.89 m (6 ft 2 in)
- Weight: 82 kg (181 lb)

Sport
- Sport: Rowing
- Club: Nereus, Amsterdam
Medal record
Representing the Netherlands
World Rowing Championships
| Bronze medal – third place | 1975 Nottingham | Coxless pairs |

Willem Cornelis Boeschoten (born 9 March 1953) is a retired Dutch rower who won a bronze medal in the coxless pairs at the 1975 World Rowing Championships, together with Jan van der Horst. They competed in this event at the 1976 Summer Olympics and finished in tenth place.
