= Francis Pelegri =

French rower

Personal information
- Born: 6 May 1952 (age 74)

Sport
- Sport: Rowing
Medal record
Men's rowing
Representing France
World Rowing Championships
Gold medal – first place	1975 Nottingham	Lwt men's four
Gold medal – first place	1976 Villach	Lwt men's four
Gold medal – first place	1977 Amsterdam	Lwt men's four

Francis Pelegri (born 6 May 1952) is a French lightweight rower. He won a gold medal at the 1975 World Rowing Championships in Nottingham with the lightweight men's four.
