= Olaf Solberg (fl. 1970s) =

Norwegian rower

Medal record

Men's rowing

Representing Norway

World Championships
Silver medal – second place	1976 Villach	Lwt coxless four

Olaf Solberg is a Norwegian lightweight rower. He won a bronze medal with the lightweight men's four at the 1976 World Rowing Championships in Villach, Austria.
