= Leo Ahonen =

Finnish rower

Personal information
- Nationality: Finnish
- Born: 6 February 1944 (age 81); Kouvola, Finland

Sport
- Sport: Rowing

Leo Ahonen (born 6 February 1944) is a Finnish rower. He competed at the 1972 Summer Olympics and the 1976 Summer Olympics.
