= Geoffrey Rees (rower) =

Australian rower

Sport
- Sport: Rowing
- Club: Melbourne University Boat Club
Medal record
Men's rowing
Representing Australia
World Rowing Championships
Gold medal – first place	1974 Lucerne	Lwt men's four
Silver medal – second place	1977 Amsterdam	Lwt men's four
Bronze medal – third place	1975 Nottingham	Lwt men's four
Bronze medal – third place	1978 Copenhagen	Lwt men's four

Geoffrey Rees is an Australian lightweight rower – a national champion and a world champion. He won Australia's first rowing World Championship title – a gold medal at the 1974 World Rowing Championships in Lucerne in a lightweight men's four.

== Club and state rowing ==
Rees' senior rowing was with the Melbourne University Boat Club.

At the Australian Rowing Championships in 1975 he won a national championship title in the lightweight coxless four. He repeated that feat in 1977 and 1978. At the Australian Rowing Championships in 1978 he also won a national title in the lightweight eight and did so again the following year.

Rees was selected in Victorian state representative lightweight fours to race the Penrith Cup at the Interstate Regatta within the Australian Rowing Championships on six occasions between 1973 and 1979. Those crews won the interstate championship from 1973 to 1975 and in 1977 and 78.

== National representative rowing ==
Rees was selected for Australian representative honours in a lightweight coxless four for the 1974 World Rowing Championships in Lucerne. That crew won Australia's first gold medal at a FISA World Rowing Championship.

The following year at Nottingham 1975 that same crew were selected to defend their title. They came third, taking the bronze medal and were the best performing Australian crew at those championships. They became the first Australian crew to win successive medals at any world championships or FISA championships.

Rees was also selected in Australia lightweight fours for Amsterdam 1977 and Lake Karapiro 1978 taking silver and bronze, respectively. His final Australian representative appearance on the international stage was in the men's lightweight eight who finished sixth at the 1979 World Rowing Championships.
