= Brian Love (rower) =

Canadian rower

Personal information
- Born: 7 April 1952 (age 74) Toronto, Ontario, Canada

Sport
- Sport: Rowing

Brian Love (born 7 April 1952) is a Canadian rower. He competed in the men's coxless pair event at the 1976 Summer Olympics.
