= David Harman =

American rower

Sport
- Sport: Rowing
Medal record
Men's rowing
Representing United States
World Championships
Gold medal – first place	1974 Lucerne	Lwt eight

David B. Harman, sometimes listed as Harmon, is an American lightweight rower. He won a gold medal at the 1974 World Rowing Championships in Lucerne with the lightweight men's eight.
