= Jan van der Horst (rower) =

Dutch rower (born 1948)

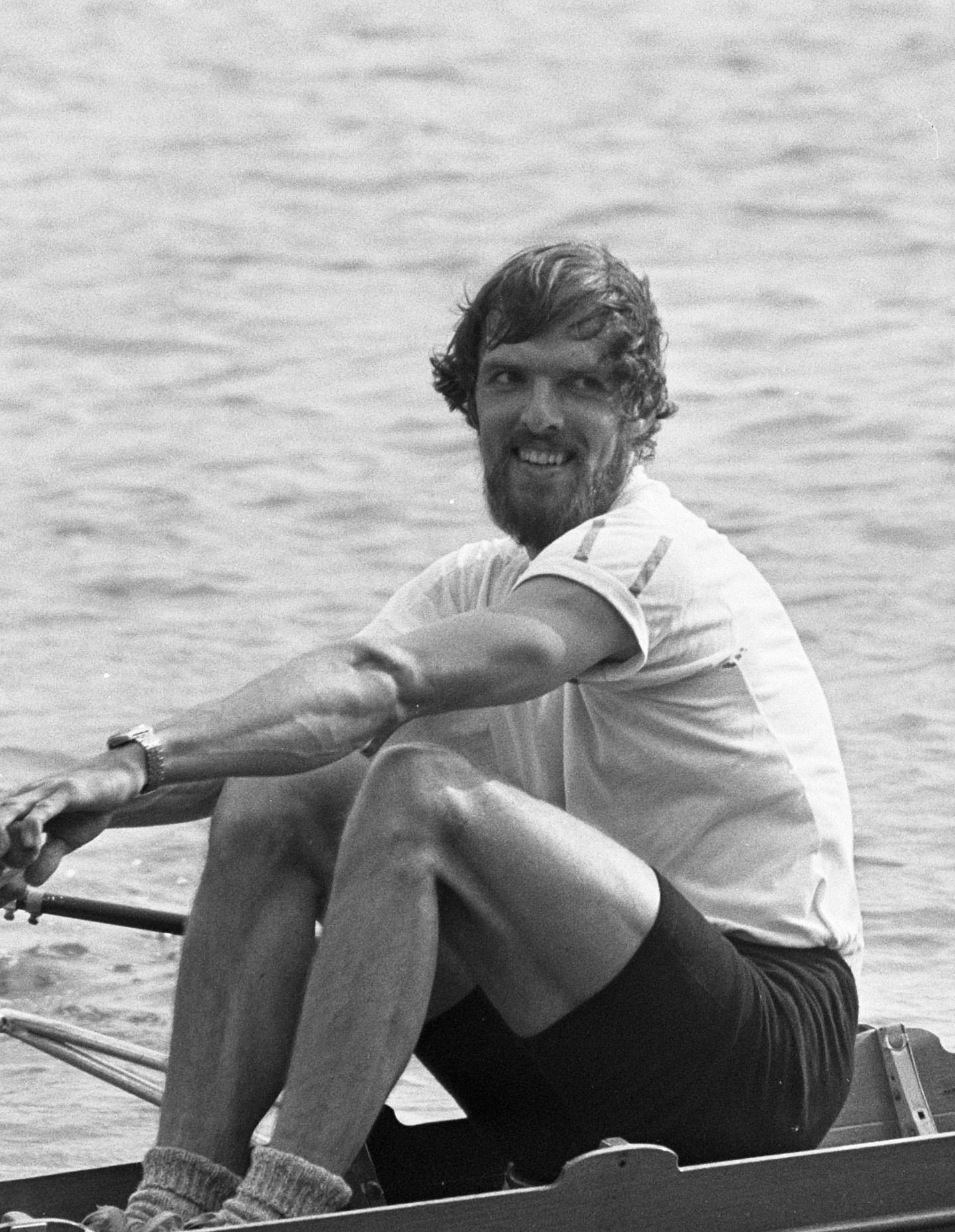
- Jan van der Horst in 1976

Personal information
- Born: 1 September 1948 (age 77) Schiedam, the Netherlands
- Height: 1.89 m (6 ft 2 in)
- Weight: 82 kg (181 lb)

Sport
- Sport: Rowing
- Club: Nereus, Amsterdam
Medal record
Men's rowing
Representing the Netherlands
World Championships
Bronze medal – third place	1975 Nottingham	Coxless pairs

Johannes Clemens Maria "Jan" van der Horst (born 1 September 1948) is a retired Dutch rower who won a bronze medal in the coxless pairs at the 1975 World Rowing Championships, together with Willem Boeschoten. They competed in this event at the 1976 Summer Olympics and finished in tenth place.
