= Kenneth Wheare =

Historian and academic administrator

Sir Kenneth Wheare CMG FBA
- Born: 26 March 1907
- Died: 7 September 1979 (aged 72)

Academic work
- Discipline: Political science
- Sub-discipline: Government; constitutions; British Commonwealth
- Institutions: Christ Church, Oxford; University College, Oxford; All Souls College, Oxford; Exeter College, Oxford

Sir Kenneth Clinton Wheare, CMG, FBA (26 March 1907 – 7 September 1979) was an Australian academic, who spent most of his career at Oxford University in England. He was an expert on the constitutions of the British Commonwealth. He advised constitutional assemblies in former British colonies.

== Early life and family ==
Wheare was educated at Scotch College, Melbourne and was later a student at Ormond College, Melbourne University and Oriel College, Oxford, gaining a first class degree in Philosophy, Politics and Economics and also undertaking postgraduate study. He met his wife Joan (1915–2013) when he was her tutor. One of their sons is Tom Wheare. Another son is Henry Wheare, the champion British rower who later became a leading intellectual property lawyer in Hong Kong.

== Career ==
In 1934, Wheare was made a university lecturer in colonial history at the University of Oxford, and joined Christ Church, Oxford with a research lectureship. During his four years at Christ Church, he concentrated his research on the effects of the Statute of Westminster 1931 and the first edition of his The Statute of Westminster and Dominion Status was published in 1938. In 1939, he was elected fellow of University College, Oxford to fill the post of tutor in politics that had been vacated by John Maud.

In 1944, Wheare was elected the first Gladstone Professor of Government at All Souls College, Oxford. He was Chairman of the Departmental Committee on Children and the Cinema from 1947 to 1950 and chaired a committee to examine film censorship in the United Kingdom. The Wheare committee's findings published in 1950 led to the introduction of a compulsory certificate, X (Explicit Content), allowing only those aged 16 and older to enter. Another outcome of the Wheare report was the creation of the Children's Film Foundation.

In 1956, he became Rector of Exeter College, Oxford. A gargoyle of his likeness is carved on the Bodleian Library, visible from the Exeter College Fellows' Garden.

Wheare was Chairman of the Rhodes Trust (1962–69), President of the British Academy (1967–71), Chancellor of the University of Liverpool from 1972. He was also a Vice-Chancellor of the University of Oxford from 1964 to 1966.

In 1948 he had contributed Abraham Lincoln and the United States to the "Teach Yourself History" series.

In June 1973, Wheare was shortlisted for appointment as Governor-General of Australia, but was overlooked by then-prime minister Gough Whitlam in favour of Sir John Kerr.

== Honours ==
Kenneth Wheare was appointed Companion of the Order of St Michael and St George (CMG) in 1953 and was knighted in 1966. In 1952, he was elected a Fellow of the British Academy (FBA), the United Kingdom's national academy for the humanities and social sciences. He gave the British Academy's 1974 Master-Mind Lecture.

In 2017, Oxford Brookes University named a newly rebuilt lecture hall after Wheare.

Academic offices
Preceded by Eric Arthur Barber	Rector of Exeter College, Oxford; 1956–1972	Succeeded by Greig Barr
Preceded by Walter Fraser Oakeshott	Vice-Chancellor of Oxford University; 1964–1966	Succeeded by Kenneth Turpin
