= Assimina Pelegri =

Greek-American materials scientist

Assimina A. (Mina) Pelegri (born 1968) is a Greek-American aerospace engineer and materials scientist whose research involves the use of the finite element method to model and study composite materials and biological soft tissue. She is a professor at Rutgers University, where she chairs the Department of Mechanical & Aerospace Engineering.

== Education and career ==
Pelegri was born in 1968. After earning a diploma in metallurgy at the National Technical University of Athens in 1992, Pelegri went to Georgia Tech for graduate studies in Aerospace Engineering, supported by a Fulbright Fellowship. She earned a master's degree in aerospace engineering in 1994, and completed a Ph.D. degree in 1997, also completing a degree in the management of technology at the same time through Georgia Tech's Scheller College of Business.

She has been on the Rutgers University faculty since 1997, and from 2010 to 2013 held the M. W. Railser Distinguished Teaching Chair there.

== Recognition ==
Pelegri was named an ASME Fellow in 2014.
