= Malhostovice =

- Municipality
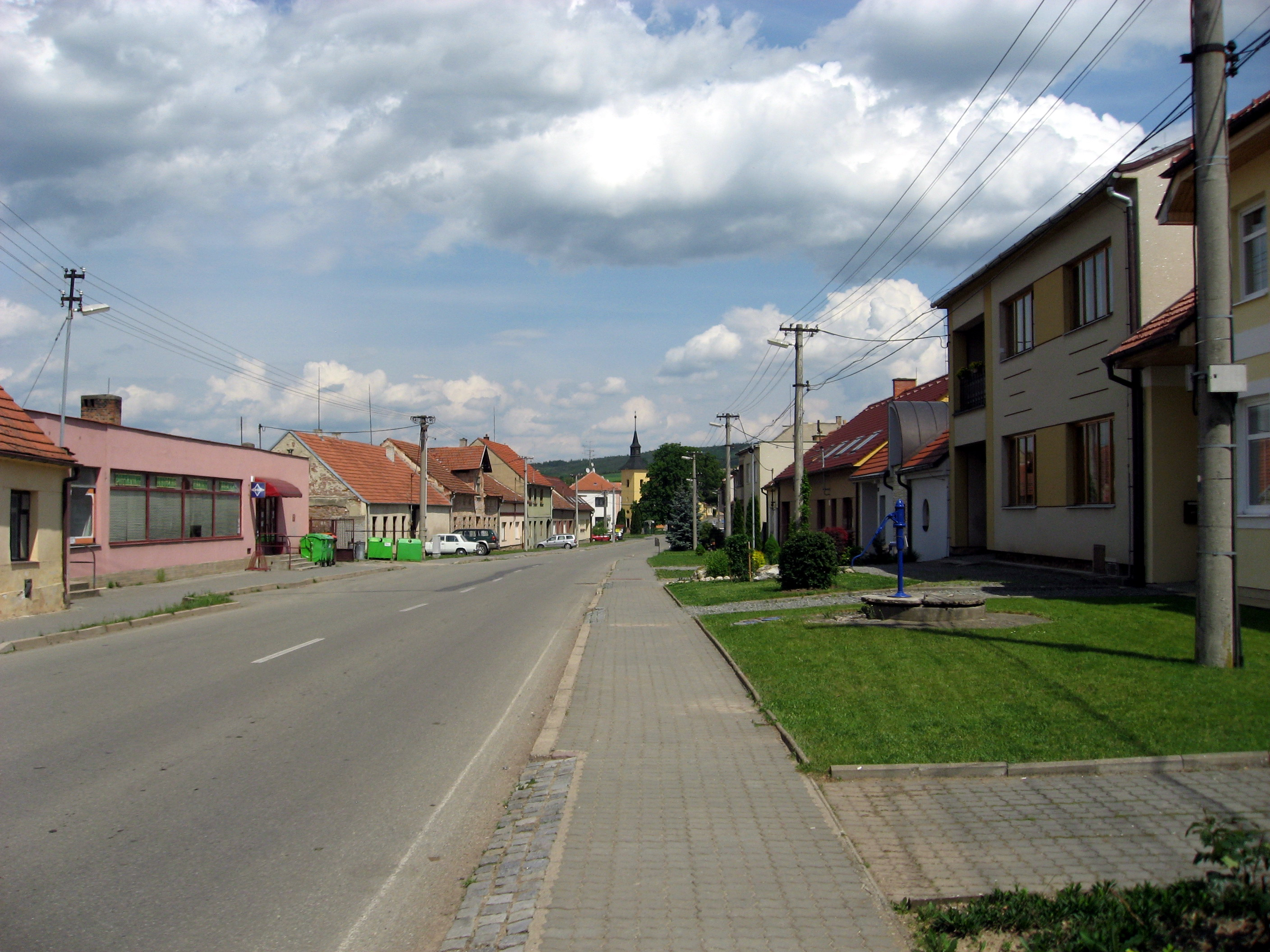
- Centre of Malhostovice

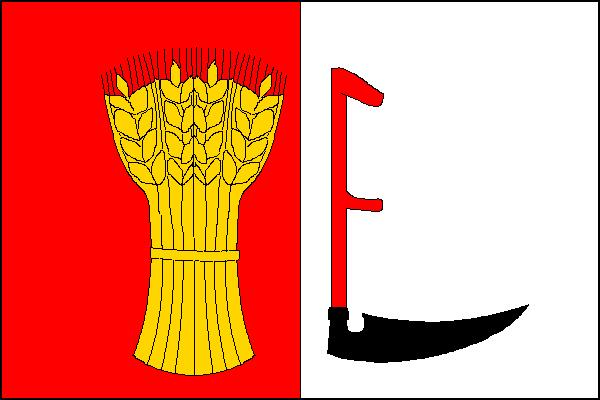
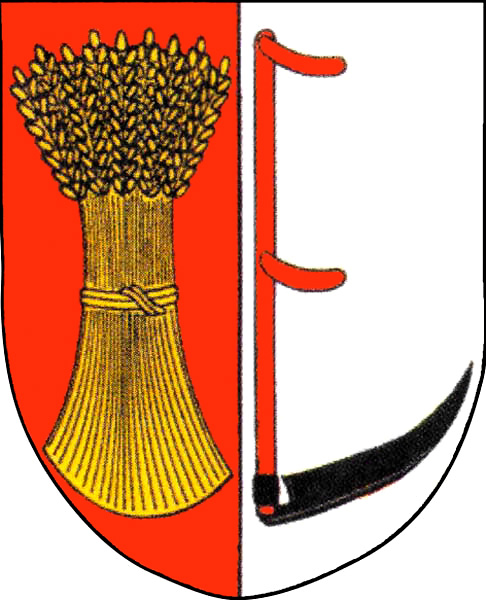
- Flag Coat of arms

- Location in the Czech Republic
- Coordinates: 49°20′1″N 16°30′8″E
- Country: Czech Republic
- Region: South Moravian
- District: Brno-Country
- First mentioned: 1320

Area
  - Total: 11.51 km^{2} (4.44 sq mi)
- Elevation: 279 m (915 ft)

Population (2026-01-01)
  - Total: 1,017
  - Density: 88.36/km^{2} (228.8/sq mi)
- Time zone: UTC+1 (CET)
  - Summer (DST): UTC+2 (CEST)
- Postal code: 666 03
- Website: www.malhostovice.eu

Malhostovice is a municipality and village in Brno-Country District in the South Moravian Region of the Czech Republic. It has about 1,000 inhabitants.

Malhostovice lies approximately 17 kilometres (11 mi) north-west of Brno and 173 km (107 mi) south-east of Prague.

== Administrative division ==
Malhostovice consists of two municipal parts (in brackets population according to the 2021 census):

- Malhostovice (823)
- Nuzířov (161)

== Demographics ==
Historical population
Year	Pop.	±%
1869	822	—
1880	830	+1.0%
1890	868	+4.6%
1900	825	−5.0%
1910	908	+10.1%
1921	911	+0.3%
1930	968	+6.3%
1950	1,015	+4.9%
1961	1,037	+2.2%
1970	947	−8.7%
1980	888	−6.2%
1991	808	−9.0%
2001	828	+2.5%
2011	914	+10.4%
2021	984	+7.7%
Source: Censuses
