= Frank Neumeister =

German rowing cox

Sport
- Sport: Rowing
Medal record
Men's rowing
Representing West Germany
World Rowing Championships
Gold medal – first place	1975 Nottingham	Lwt eight

Frank Neumeister is a German coxswain. He won a gold medal at the 1975 World Rowing Championships in Nottingham with the lightweight men's eight.
