= Wolfgang Hönig =

German rower

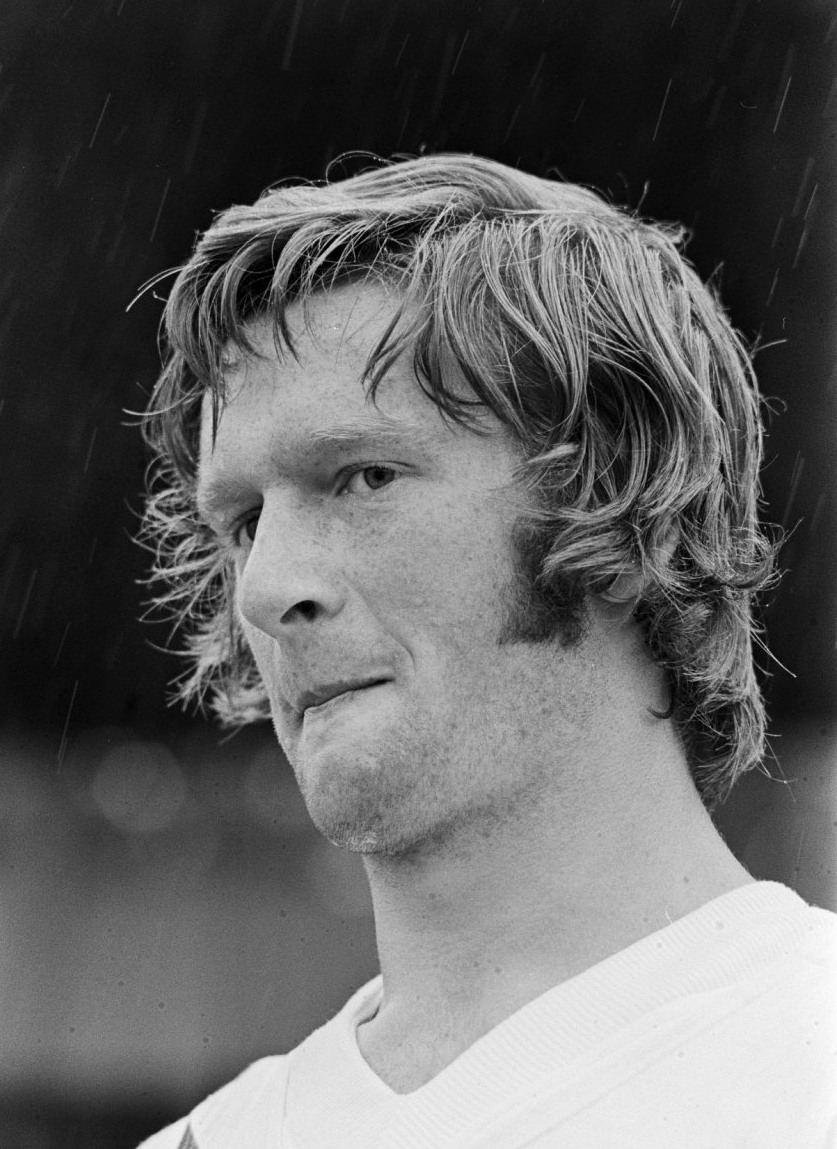
- Hönig in 1974

Personal information
- Born: 21 January 1954 (age 72)

Sport
- Sport: Rowing
- Club: Chemie Halle SC
Medal record
Men's rowing
Representing East Germany
World Rowing Championships
Gold medal – first place	1974 Lucerne	Single sculls
Gold medal – first place	1975 Nottingham	Quadruple sculls

Wolfgang Hönig (born 21 January 1954) is a retired East German rower who won two world titles, in the single sculls in 1974 and in the quadruple sculls in 1975.
