= Bernd Frieberg =

German rower

Sport
- Sport: Rowing
- Club: ASK Rostock
Medal record
Men's rowing
Representing East Germany
World Rowing Championships
Gold medal – first place	1977 Amsterdam	Eight

Bernd Frieberg is a rower who competed for East Germany.

Frieberg rowed for ASK Rostock. In July 1971, he won a junior regatta between Eastern Bloc countries in the single scull. In July 1972, Frieberg won in the single scull at the East German national championships. For the men, the competition was not regarded as a full championship as the Olympic team was competing at the Rotsee regatta at the same time. Two weeks later, Frieberg won a regatta in the single scull in Potsdam against competition from the Soviet Union. At the 1973 national championships, he came second with his quad scull team and third in double scull. At the 1974 national championships, he came second once more in quad scull but with a completely different team. In 1975, he came third at the nationals in quad scull, once more with a different team.

In 1976, Frieberg switched to sweep rowing. He won the national championships in coxless pair partnered with Ulrich Kons. However, this being an Olympic year, the Olympic team did not participate in the nationals. He also came second with the men's eight at the nationals that year.

In 1977, Frieberg remained in the eight. The team went to international regattas and they won that year's regatta on the Rotsee in Switzerland. Later in the same month, that team took out the East German national championship title. That team went to the 1977 World Rowing Championships in the Netherlands where they became world champions in that boat class.

In 1978, Frieberg was placed in the men's eight that was considered the second boat by the rowing officials. Surprisingly, that boat won the national championships in mid-July. In the end, a composite men's eight was formed for subsequent international competitions including the 1978 World Rowing Championships, with five rowers and the cox taken from the 1978 national championship team, plus three rowers from the second-placed boat. Frieberg, Bernd Krauß and Ortwin Rodewald were the three rowers who got replaced. Frieberg retired after the 1978 rowing season.
