= Henry Clay (rower) =

British rower

Personal information
- Full name: John Henry Clay
- Nationality: English
- Born: 20 March 1955 (age 71) London
Medal record
Men's rowing
Representing Great Britain
Men's rowing
| Silver medal – second place | 1980 Moscow | Eight |

John Henry Clay (born 20 March 1955) is a British rower who competed in the 1976 Summer Olympics and in the 1980 Summer Olympics.

== Biography ==
Clay was educated at Cambridge University. He rowed for Cambridge in The Boat Race in the 1974, 1975 and 1976 races. Cambridge won in 1975.

At the 1976 Summer Olympics Clay partnered David Sturge in the coxless pair and finished twelfth. In 1977 he was part of the eight that reached the final and finished 5th, at the 1977 World Rowing Championships in Amsterdam.

Three years later in the 1980 Summer Olympics Clay was a member of the British boat which won the silver medal in the eights competition.

== See also ==
- List of Cambridge University Boat Race crews
