= Valentin Stoev =

Bulgarian rower (1952–2018)

Personal information
- Nationality: Bulgarian
- Born: 18 July 1952
- Died: 28 January 2018 (aged 65)

Sport
- Sport: Rowing

Valentin Stoev (Bulgarian: Валентин Стоев, 18 July 1952 – 28 January 2018) was a Bulgarian rower. He competed at the 1976 Summer Olympics and the 1980 Summer Olympics.
