= Georgi Georgiev (rower) =

Bulgarian rower

Personal information
- Nationality: Bulgarian
- Born: 18 July 1951 (age 75)

Sport
- Sport: Rowing

Georgi Georgiev (Bulgarian: Георги Георгиев, born 18 July 1951) is a Bulgarian rower. He competed in the 1976 Summer Olympics and the 1980 Summer Olympics.
