= Tom Wheare =

English schoolmaster and headmaster

Thomas David Wheare FRSA (born 1944) is an English schoolmaster and headmaster.

== Biography ==
Wheare was educated at the Dragon School and Magdalen College School in Oxford. He then went on to King's College, Cambridge (gaining an exhibition, studying History, and singing in the College Choir) and Christ Church, Oxford (studying Education for a Dip.Ed. and acting as a lay clerk in the Christ Church Cathedral Choir).

During his career as a teacher, he has been a Housemaster at Shrewsbury School and Assistant Master at Eton College. From 1983 to 2005, he was Head of Bryanston School in Dorset. The Tom Wheare Music School at Bryanston, designed by Hopkins Architects, was opened in September 2014.

Wheare was an active member of the Headmasters' and Headmistresses' Conference (HMC), serving as Treasurer from 1993 to 1999, and chairman in 2000. He has been a governor of a number of schools over the years, including Blackheath High School, the Dragon School, Exeter School, and Port Regis School. He is Deputy Chairman of the Girls' Day School Trust and has been a member of the executive committee of the Association of Governing Bodies of Independent Schools (AGBIS).

Wheare is a Fellow of the Royal Society of Arts. He edits the annual Which School? books and the HMC magazine, Conference & Common Room.

He is the son of Sir Kenneth Wheare and Lady (Joan) Wheare, is married and has two daughters. He lives in Wiltshire.

Educational offices
Preceded by David Jones	Head of Bryanston School; 1983–2005	Succeeded by Sarah Thomas
