= Zbigniew Ślusarski =

Polish rower

Personal information
- Nationality: Polish
- Born: 18 May 1947; Unisław Śląski, Poland
- Died: 3 November 2004 (aged 57); Gliwice, Poland

Sport
- Sport: Rowing

Zbigniew Ślusarski (18 May 1947 - 3 November 2004) was a Polish rower. He competed in the men's coxless pair event at the 1976 Summer Olympics.

His brother Alfons was also a rower and an Olympian.
