= Mike Neary =

Canadian rower

Michael Neary
Personal information
- Born: 5 November 1948 (age 77) Ottawa, Ontario, Canada

Sport
- Sport: Rowing

Michael Neary (born 5 November 1948) is a Canadian rower. He competed at the 1972 Summer Olympics and the 1976 Summer Olympics. He also competed for Canada in the World Rowing Championships in St Catharines Canada in 1970, in Lucerne Switzerland in 1974, in Nottingham England in 1975, as well as in the Pan Am Games in Cali Colombia in 1971 and Mexico City Mexico in 1975. He was a member of the Argonaut Rowing Club in Toronto, Ontario.
