= Miroslav Knapek =

Czech rower

Personal information
- Born: 3 March 1955 (age 71) Brno, Czech Republic
- Height: 183 cm (6 ft 0 in)
- Weight: 83 kg (183 lb)

Sport
- Sport: Rowing

Miroslav Knapek (born 3 March 1955) is a retired Czech rower. He competed in the coxless pairs at the 1976 and 1980 Summer Olympics and placed sixth and fifth, respectively. His daughter Miroslava Knapková also became a rower and won the single sculls event at the 2012 Olympics.
