= The Boat Race 1968 =

114th Boat Race
- Date: 30 March 1968
- Winner: Cambridge
- Margin of victory: 3 1/2 lengths
- Winning time: 18 minutes 22 seconds
- Overall record (Cambridge–Oxford): 62–51
- Umpire: Harold Rickett (Cambridge)

Other races
- Reserve winner: Goldie
- Women's winner: Cambridge

The 114th Boat Race took place on 30 March 1968. Held annually, the event is a side-by-side rowing race between crews from the Universities of Oxford and Cambridge along the River Thames. The race, umpired by Harold Rickett, was won by Cambridge by 3 1/2 lengths. Goldie won the reserve race and Cambridge won the Women's Boat Race.

== Background ==
The Boat Race is a side-by-side rowing competition between the University of Oxford (sometimes referred to as the "Dark Blues") and the University of Cambridge (sometimes referred to as the "Light Blues"). The race was first held in 1829, and since 1845 has taken place on the 4.2-mile (6.8 km) Championship Course on the River Thames in southwest London. The rivalry is a major point of honour between the two universities, followed throughout the United Kingdom and broadcast worldwide. Oxford went into the race as reigning champions, having won the previous year's race by 3 1/4 lengths. Cambridge, however, held the overall lead with 61 victories to Oxford's 51 (excluding the "dead heat" of 1877).

The first Women's Boat Race took place in 1927, but did not become an annual fixture until the 1960s. Up until 2014, the contest was conducted as part of the Henley Boat Races, but as of the 2015 race, it is held on the River Thames, on the same day as the men's main and reserve races. The reserve race, contested between Oxford's Isis boat and Cambridge's Goldie boat has been held since 1965. It usually takes place on the Tideway, prior to the main Boat Race.

Oxford were coached by Hugh "Jumbo" Edwards and Ronnie Howard, while Cambridge were overseen by a team including Lou Barry, Donald Legget, Mike Muir-Smith (who was in the Tideway Scullers School first eight), Derek Drury and Arnold Cooke. As a result of television contracts and to avoid a clash with the Grand National, the scheduled start time for the race was pushed back to 3.40–p.m., some forty minutes after the "best of the tide". The umpire was Harold Rickett who rowed for Cambridge in the 1930, 1931 and 1932 races, and who had represented Great Britain in the 1932 Summer Olympics.

== Crews ==
The Cambridge crew weighed an average of 13 st 7.5 lb (85.7 kg), 6.25 pounds (2.8 kg) per rower more than their opponents. Oxford's crew contained five Blues, including the future Oxford University Boat Club coach Daniel Topolski, and Martin Kennard who was rowing in his third Boat Race. Cambridge saw four Blues return, with their boat club president Patrick Delafield making his third appearance in the event. While Cambridge's crew contained no registered overseas competitors, Oxford's John Bockstoce and Bill Fink were both from the United States.

Seat	Oxford			Cambridge		
Seat	Name	College	Weight	Name	College	Weight
Bow	D. Topolski	New College	11 st 6 lb	R. C. W. Church	1st & Third Trinity	13 st 5 lb
2	M. S. Kennard	St Edmund Hall	13 st 1.5 lb	R. N. Winckless	Fitzwilliam	13 st 9 lb
3	J. P. W. Hawksley	Balliol	12 st 6 lb	J. H. Reddaway	Fitzwilliam	13 st 8 lb
4	D. G. C. Thomson	Keble	13 st 12 lb	C. S. Powell	Downing	14 st 13 lb
5	P. G. Saltmarsh	Keble	13 st 6 lb	P. G. R. Delafield (P)	Jesus	14 st 7 lb
6	J. R. Bockstoce (P)	St Edmund Hall	14 st 3 lb	N. J. Hornsby	Trinity Hall	14 st 5 lb
7	W. R. Fink	Keble	13 st 5 lb	G. C. M. Leggett	St Catharine's	12 st 12 lb
Stroke	P. C. Pritchard	New College	12 st 13 lb	G. F. Hall	Downing	12 st 0 lb
Cox	A. W. Painter	Hertford	8 st 2 lb	C. J. Gill	Fitzwilliam	8 st 9 lb
Source: (P) – Boat club president

== Race ==
The Championship Course along which the Boat Race is contested

Cambridge won the toss and elected to start from the Surrey station. The race commenced at 3.40 p.m., in a "slight drizzle". After a fast start, Cambridge took a half-length lead by Fulham. Rounding the Middlesex bend, Oxford drew back into contention and the crews were level at the Mile Post in a time of 4 minutes 4 seconds. On the approach to Harrods Furniture Depository, Painter, the Dark Blue cox, steered his boat so close to the Surrey shore that Douglas Calder, writing in The Times, suggested "if the crews had gone any farther over they would have been practically on the towpath". After being warned twice by the umpire for steering too close to their opponents, and taking a small lead, Oxford were made to concede to the Light Blues, and Cambridge rallied. Despite rough water through Crabtree Reach, Cambridge pushed on at Hammersmith Bridge and opened an eight-second lead by the time the crews reached Chiswick Steps. By Barnes Bridge they had extended their lead to twelve seconds, and passed the finishing post 3 1/2 lengths ahead in a time of 18 minutes 22 seconds. It was the Light Blues' first victory in four years. Their cox remarked "I think we could have won on a foul if I had forced a collision at Harrods. However, we did not want to win this way if we could help it. I decided to give Oxford enough rope to hang themselves ..."

Cambridge's Goldie won the fourth running of the reserve race, defeating Oxford's Isis by 5 1/2 lengths in at time of 18 minutes 44 seconds. In the 23rd Women's Boat Race, Cambridge won, taking their sixth consecutive victory.
