= David Sturge =

British rower

Personal information
- Nationality: British
- Born: 5 June 1948 (age 78)

Sport
- Club: Tyne; London; Lady Margaret

David Philip Sturge (born 5 June 1948) is a former British rower who competed for Great Britain in the 1976 Summer Olympics.

== Rowing career ==
Sturge was educated at St John's College, Cambridge University. He rowed in the winning Cambridge boat in The Boat Race in 1973. Also in 1973, he won the single sculls title rowing for the London Rowing Club, at the 1973 National Rowing Championships., was runner up in the Diamond Challenge Sculls at Henley Royal Regatta, and won the Wingfield Sculls. He won the Wingfield Sculls again in 1974. Sturge competed for Great Britain at the 1976 Summer Olympics in the coxless pairs partnering Henry Clay. They came 12th overall.

== See also ==
- List of Cambridge University Boat Race crews
