= Alfons Ślusarski =

Polish rower

Personal information
- Nationality: Polish
- Born: 23 January 1942 (age 83); Sosnów, German-occupied Poland

Sport
- Sport: Rowing

Alfons Ślusarski (born 23 January 1942) is a Polish former rower. He competed at the 1964, 1968, 1972 and the 1976 Summer Olympics.

His brother Zbigniew was also a rower and an Olympian.
