= Rusty Robertson =

New Zealand rowing coach (1927–1990)

Russell Robertson MBE (1927 – 17 February 1990), known as Rusty Robertson, was a New Zealand-born, world class rowing coach of New Zealand and later, Australian national representative rowing crews. He was the national rowing coach of New Zealand from 1967 to 1976, and the national coach of Australia from 1979 to 1984.

== Early life ==
Robertson was born in 1927, the son of Amelia Dorothy and William John Robertson. He was from Oamaru in Otago and commenced rowing at the age of 16 at the Oamaru Rowing Club. A serious car accident broke his back and forced a premature retirement from rowing and an early start to coaching. He coached Oamaru crews for many years and was Club Captain for a decade. At 300 metres (980 ft) long, his home town has the shortest rowing course in the country, and Robertson devised a training method by which rowers would use one arm only and go round and round in circles.

== Coaching career ==
=== New Zealand ===
Robertson first had representative success at the 1962 Commonwealth Games in Perth, Australia, where an Oamaru coxed four he coached of Winston Stephens, Keith Heselwood, Hugh Smedley, George Paterson, and Doug Pulman as cox, won the gold and became Commonwealth champions. His first Olympic success came at the 1968 Summer Olympics in Mexico City, where his coxed four Warren Cole, Ross Collinge, Dick Joyce, Dudley Storey, and Simon Dickie as cox won gold. This 1968 Olympic win marked the beginning of New Zealand's first golden era in rowing, and would last until the 1976 Summer Olympics. Both the 1968 coxed four and Robertson would later be inducted into the New Zealand Sports Hall of Fame. In the 1969 Queen's Birthday Honours, Robertson was appointed a Member of the Order of the British Empire, for services to sport.

Robertson's career highlight was when his 1972 New Zealand eight won gold at the 1972 Summer Olympics in Munich. The New Zealand crew was regarded as race favourites and whilst they did not dominate in the qualifying heats, they won the final comfortably. The champion 1972 New Zealand eight won Sportsman of the Year Awards in both 1971 and 1972. The crew standing on the victory dais overcome with emotion and "bawling like babies" is one of New Zealand's most memorable sporting moments. One of the crewmembers, bowman Gary Robertson, is Rusty's nephew.

Four years later, when the men's eight only managed third place at the 1976 Summer Olympics in Montreal, Robertson was dismissed as the national rowing coach. He went to Australia to continue his coaching career.

=== Australia ===
Relocating to Sydney Robertson took on a senior coaching role at the Drummoyne Rowing Club. He was involved in schoolboy coaching with the Sydney Grammar School and was in charge in 1978 when Grammar eights took both the 1st and 2nd VIII titles at the GPS Head of the River following a 22 year drought.

Robertson coached Drummoyne rowers and scullers, lightweight and heavyweight in competition for national titles at the Australian Rowing Championships from 1978. He was coach of New South Wales state senior eights competing in the Interstate Eight-Oared Championship (the King's Cup) in 1979, 1983, 1984 (to victory), 1985, 1987 and 1988.

Robertson was Australia's national rowing coach from 1979 to 1984.

He coached the Australian men's lightweight coxless four to World Championship victories in 1980 and 1981. The crew consisted of his Drummoyne clubmen Graham Gardiner and Clyde Hefer who throughout 1980 had vied for top national honours against the Victorian pair of Charles Bartlett and Simon Gillett. New Australian National Director of Coaching Reinhold Batschi had introduced a small boat racing selection methodology and the choice of the two competitively matched pairs to comprise the Australian IV was clear. The crew took the gold medal and won Australia's second lightweight World Championship title. The following year the same crew raced at the 1981 World Rowing Championships in Munich and successfully defended their title.

In 1983 he coached the Australian men's lightweight eight consisting of Victorian, Tasmanian and West Australian oarsmen to a silver medal at Duisburg 1983.

For the 1984 Summer Olympics in Los Angeles, the men's eight coach was one of the first appointments to be determined. Robertson was the prominent men's coach at the time but the appointment went to Roberston's boss Reinhold Batschi, National Coaching Director though not an active coach at the time. Robertson took the men's quad scull and coached them to a silver olympic medal.

== Death and legacy ==
Robertson died aged 62 on 17 February 1990, after collapsing while coaching from the banks of the Nepean River. A Rusty Robertson Cup regatta is held annually in Australia. The New South Wales Rowing Association (NSWRA) awards 'the Rusty Robertson MBE Award for services to rowing'. Their by-law reads:

The Board of Directors may from time to time at its discretion confer an award to be known as the "Rusty Robertson MBE Award" to an individual who has, or group of individuals who have, in the opinion of the Board made a significant and sustained contribution to the endeavours and objects of the Association.

== International representative coaching record ==
=== New Zealand ===
- 1962 Commonwealth Games Men's 4+ coach–Gold
- 1968 Olympic Games Men's 4+ coach–Gold
- 1970 World Rowing Championships Men's 8+ coach–Bronze
- 1971 European Rowing Championships Men's 8+ coach–Gold
- 1972 Olympic Games Men's 4- coach–Silver
- 1972 Olympic Games Men's 8+ coach–Gold
- 1973 European Rowing Championships Men's 2+ coach–Bronze
- 1974 World Rowing Championships Men's 8+ coach–Bronze
- 1974 World Rowing Championships Men's 2- coach–Silver
- 1975 World Rowing Championships Men's 8+ coach–Bronze
- 1976 Olympic Games Men's 8+ coach–Bronze

=== Australia ===
- 1979 World Rowing Championships Men's Lwt 4- coach–Sixth
- 1980 World Rowing Championships Men's Lwt 4- coach–Gold
- 1981 World Rowing Championships Men's Lwt 4- coach–Gold
- 1981 World Rowing Championships Men's Lwt 2x coach–11th
- 1981 World Rowing Championships Men's Lwt 1x coach–11th
- 1983 World Rowing Championships Men's Lwt 8+ coach–Silver
- 1984 Olympic Games Men's 4x coach–Silver
- 1985 World Rowing Championships Men's Lwt 1x coach–9th
- 1985 World Rowing Championships Men's 4x coach–8th
- 1987 World Rowing Championships Men's Lwt 8+ coach–8th
