= Clyde Hefer =

Australian rower

Personal information
- Full name: Robert Clyde Hefer
- Nickname: Clyde
- Born: 12 April 1961 (age 65)
- Years active: 1978–1984

Sport
- Country: Australia
- Sport: Rowing
- Club: Drummoyne Rowing Club; Balmain Rowing Club
Medal record
Men's rowing
Representing Australia
Olympic Games
Bronze medal – third place	1984 Los Angeles	Eight
World Rowing Championships
Gold medal – first place	1980 Hazewinkel	LM4-
Gold medal – first place	1981 Munich	LM4-

Clyde Hefer (born 12 April 1961) is an Australian former rower - a two-time World Champion and Olympic medal winner.

== Club and state rowing ==
Hefer's senior rowing was with the Drummoyne Rowing Club in Sydney. At the Australian Rowing Championships in 1979 he won a national championship title in a lightweight M4- with his brother Gary, Geoff Webb and Graeme Wearne. In 1980 Graham Gardiner joined Hefer at Drummoyne and at that year's nationals Hefer won two Australian championship titles - the lightweight M2- with Gardiner and the lightweight M4- with Gardiner, Wearne and Michael Smith. In 1981 in those same two crews Hefer again raced for those same titles but this time representing the Balmain Rowing Club and both to 2nd place.

From 1982 Hefer was racing in the open weight division and was back at the Drummoyne Rowing Club from 1984 under coach Rusty Robertson. He was selected in New South Wales King's Cup crews of 1982, 1983 (at stroke) and in the victorious crew of 1984.

== National representative rowing ==
Hefer was selected for Australian representative honours in a LM4- for the 1980 World Rowing Championships in Hazewinkel - a lightweight only championship being an Olympic year. With Gardiner he'd vied for top national honours throughout 1980 against the Victorian pair of Charles Bartlett and Simon Gillett. New Australian National Coaching Director Reinhold Batschi had just introduced a small boat racing selection methodology and the choice of the two competitively matched pairs to comprise the Australian IV was clear. The crew took the gold medal and won Australia's second lightweight World Championship title. The following year in the same crew, Hefer raced at the 1981 World Rowing Championships in Munich and they successfully defended their title.

In 1984 Hefer along with half of the champion New South Wales Kings Cup crew were selected in the Olympic VIII for Los Angeles. Coached by Reinhold Batschi, stroked by Steve Evans and with Hefer in the two seat they brought home the bronze medal.
