= Kim Mackney =

Australian rower

Personal information
- Nationality: Australian
- Born: 5 February 1949 (age 77)
- Education: Newington College

Sport
- Sport: Rowing
- Club: Mosman Rowing Club; Sydney Rowing Club; Glebe Rowing Club

Achievements and titles
- Olympic finals: Rowing at the 1972 Summer Olympics – Men's coxless pair
- National finals: King's Cup 1969 & 70

Kim Mackney (born 5 February 1949) is an Australian former representative rower. He competed in the men's coxless pair event at the 1972 Summer Olympics. From school until the national elite representative level and onto a long world-class masters career, Mackney rowed competitively for over fifty years. He can be credited with salvaging and re-establishing the Glebe Rowing Club in Sydney after its 1992 demise.

== Club and state rowing ==
Mackney's was introduced to rowing by his father Walter Mackney who had stroked the victorious New South Wales King's Cup crew of 1935 and the Australian men's eight at the 1936 Berlin Olympics.

Mackney attended Newington College from 1961 until 1966. During his long Sydney club career Kim Mackney rowed from most of the clubs on the harbour. He started at Mosman Rowing Club and then had thirteen seasons at Sydney Rowing Club from where he made national representation. He next rowed from Haberfield in 1979 and then moved to Drummoyne Rowing Club to row under coach Rusty Robertson in attempting to regain national selection. In 1981 Mackney and Terry Davis moved to Glebe Rowing Club to row under coach Milan Parker.

Mackney first made state representation for New South Wales in the 1969 men's eight which contested the King's Cup at the annual interstate regatta. In 1970 he again rowed in the New South Wales King's Cup eight.

In 1970 in SRC colours he competed for the national coxless four title at the Australian Rowing Championships. At the 1972 Australian Championships in a Sydney crew he won the coxless four national title in a row-over. In 1973 he contested both the double-sculls title and the coxless four. In 1976 in a composite Haberfield/Sydney crew he contested the national quad sculls title, placing second behind another Haberfield/Sydney combination. The following year he again contested the quad scull title in a Sydney crew and placed second.

In 1978 Mackney moved to Haberfield and he made the final of the coxless pair title at the Australian Rowing Championships in both 1978 and 1979 in the black and white of Haberfield. In 1980 Mackney was rowing under coach Robertson at Drummoyne and at the 1980 Australian Rowing Championships he raced a coxless pair, a coxed pair, a coxless four and a coxed four. In 1981 he wore Glebe colours when he raced in a composite Sydney/Glebe coxed four at the Australian Championships.

== International representative rowing ==
Mackney made his Australian representative debut in the 1967 Trans Tasman series in an all-Sydney Rowing Club coxed four. That four lost all three of its match races against New Zealand. In 1972 he stroked an Australian coxless pair with Chris Stevens which raced at the Munich Olympics. They were eliminated in the repechage.

== Glebe Rowing Club's fall and rise ==
Mackney rowed at the Glebe Rowing Club for twelve years until its 1993 financial demise. The club's financial failure saw it lose its boatshed and clubhouse at the foot of Ferry Road, Glebe at Blackwattle Bay. The shed was taken over by the Sydney University Women's Boat Club and the clubhouse upstairs by a successful restaurant. Initially Mackney and other Glebe rowing members used the Drummoyne Rowing Club facilities. All the Glebe rowers eventually joined other clubs except Mackney who continued to wear Glebe colours and row from 1994 to 2004 as the sole registered Glebe competitive member primarily from the Leichhardt Rowing Club in composite crews with LRC members.

By 2004 with grass-roots support, the Glebe Rowing Club re-established itself as a charitable institution. Other clubs and school rowing sheds donated surplus boats, oars, spare parts and paraphernalia. A new shed was built on council land next to the old boatshed but water access initially involved boating from the muddy shore. Eventually a pontoon and deck were added with public access zoning. Member numbers increased and the club became viable again.

Mackney's tenure as President lasted from 1994 to 2016 covering all of the years in wilderness and the re-establishment of the Glebe Rowing Club to viability.

== Masters rowing career ==
Mackney carried on rowing after his elite competition days ended in 1981. He began competing at Australian Masters Championships in the 1980s. At the 2007 World Masters Championships in Zagreb, Mackney and Terry Davis won gold in the men's E category coxless pair. They repeated this feat at the 2009 World Masters Games held at the Sydney Olympic Regatta Centre at Penrith. In a men's D category coxless four they also won gold along with Ken Major and David Clark of the Glebe Club.

In a 2014 interview Mackney estimated his title wins at the Masters levels at 30 or 40. He stated that he had been rowing consistently over fifty-four consecutive seasons since 1961.
