= Terry Davis (rower) =

Australian businessman (born 1958)

Terry Davis (born 1958) is an Australian businessman and former state representative rower. From 2001 to 2014 he was chief executive of Coca-Cola Amatil in Australia.

== Club and state rowing career ==
Raised in Hobart Tasmania, Davis attended Rosetta High School where he took up rowing. His senior rowing was initially from the Buckingham Rowing Club outside of Hobart before his relocation to Sydney.

Davis made his state representative debut for Tasmania in the 1975 youth eight which contested the Noel Wilkinson Trophy at the 1975 Australian Interstate Regatta. The following year he was selected in the Tasmanian men's eight which competed for the King's Cup at the annual Interstate Regatta. In 1977 he again rowed in the Tasmanian King's Cup eight.

At the 1977 Australian Rowing Championships Davis rowed in a coxed four which contested the national coxed four title and placed third. By 1980 Davis was rowing with Kim Mackney under coach Rusty Robertson at Drummoyne Rowing Club in Sydney. At the 1980 Australian Rowing Championships he raced a coxless pair, a coxless four and a coxed four. In 1981 Davis and Kim Mackney moved to Glebe Rowing Club to row under coach Milan Parker and that year Davis wore Glebe Rowing Club colours when he raced in a composite Sydney/Glebe coxed four at the Australian Championships.

== Masters rowing ==
Davis resumed rowing in 2006 with the objective of making the 2007 World Masters Championships in Zagreb. Since then he has won ten world rowing masters titles.

== Professional career ==
Davis was a senior executive in the Australian liquor industry. He worked for the Foster's Group from 1987 to 2001 firstly as managing director of Cellarmasters Wines and then of their Mildara Blass wine division.

In 2001 Davis was appointed as chief executive of Coca-Cola Amatil in Australia. His job title was group managing director, and he served in that role until 2014. Subsequently he has been a director of Seven Group Holdings and of St George Bank Limited from 2004 until 2008. He was a member of the University of New South Wales Council from 2006 to 2014.
