= Wal Mackney =

Australian sportsman

Personal information
- Born: 28 July 1905 Bellingen, New South Wales, Australia
- Died: 4 October 1975 (aged 70) Wahroonga, New South Wales, Australia

Sport
- Country: Australia
- Sport: Rowing
- Club: Mosman Rowing Club; Sydney Police Rowing Club

Achievements and titles
- National finals: King's Cup 1935

Walter Arthur Reginald Mackney (28 July 1905 – 4 October 1975) was an Australian representative rugby player and rower. He toured South Africa with the Wallabies in 1933 and played in representative rugby sides till 1935. As a rower he was a national champion who competed in the men's eight event at the 1936 Summer Olympics.

== Early life ==
Mackney was born in the Bellingen district of New South Wales. With his father away at war, Mackney left school aged 13 and took a job as a timber-cutter in the Dorrigo timber camps. He learnt to drive a bullock team and then did itinerant farm work in Queensland. At age 20 he came to Sydney and joined the police force.

== Rugby career ==
Mackney was introduced to rugby through the police force. He joined the Northern Suburbs Rugby Union and made the senior team in 1930. He represented New South Wales against Queensland in 1930, toured South Africa with the Wallabies in 1933 and made his Australian representative debut against the Springboks in the first Test at Cape Town in July 1933. He made two Test appearances against South Africa on that tour. He made two Bledisloe Cup appearances against New Zealand in 1934 The first was a victory in Sydney and with the second match a fortnight later being a draw, Mackney stands as a member of the first Wallaby squad to have won the Bledisloe Cup away from New Zealand. In 1935 he played in an Australian side against the New Zealand Maoris.

== Rowing career and lineage ==
Mackney joined the Mosman Rowing Club and made their senior eight in 1932 and 1933. He also rowed for the New South Wales Police club and along with three other Police rowers was selected to the New South Wales state eight which contested the 1935 King's Cup. Mackney stroked that crew to victory. In 1936 the Police Club's eight dominated the Sydney racing season, the New South Wales state titles and won the Henley-on-Yarra event. They were selected in toto as Australia's men's eight to compete at the 1936 Berlin Olympics with their attendance funded by the NSW Police Federation. The Australian eight stroked by Mackney finished fourth in its heat, behind Hungary, Italy and Canada. It failed to qualify through the repechage to the final.

Wal's son Kim Mackney was also an Australian Olympian rower who competed at Munich 1972. Kim rowed competitively into his sixties, was a stalwart member and President of the Glebe Rowing Club and represented Australia at World Masters Rowing Championships.

== Other sports ==
Wal Mackney reached the semi-finals of the Australian heavyweight boxing championships in 1928. He was a competitive member of the Queenscliff SLSC and later the Mona Vale SLSC. In 1940 he was selected in a Mona Vale surf-boat crew which made an overseas tour to Honolulu.
