= Terry Davis =

Terry Davis may refer to:

- Terry Davis (politician) (1938–2024), British Labour Party politician and Secretary General of the Council of Europe
- Terry Davis (author) (born 1946), American novelist
- Terry Davis (American football) (fl. 1970–1972), American football player
- Terry Acebo Davis (born 1953), Filipino-American artist and nurse
- Terry Davis (rower) (born 1958), Australian rower and beverage industry executive
- Terry Davis (basketball) (born 1967), American basketball player
- Terry A. Davis (1969–2018), American computer programmer who created and designed the operating system TempleOS
- Terry Davis (priest), Dean of St George's Cathedral, Georgetown, Guyana

== See also ==
- Terence Davis (born 1997), American basketball player
- Terry Davies (disambiguation)
