= Battle of Brassó (1916) =

World War I battle

- Part of the Battle of Transylvania of the Romanian Campaign of World War I
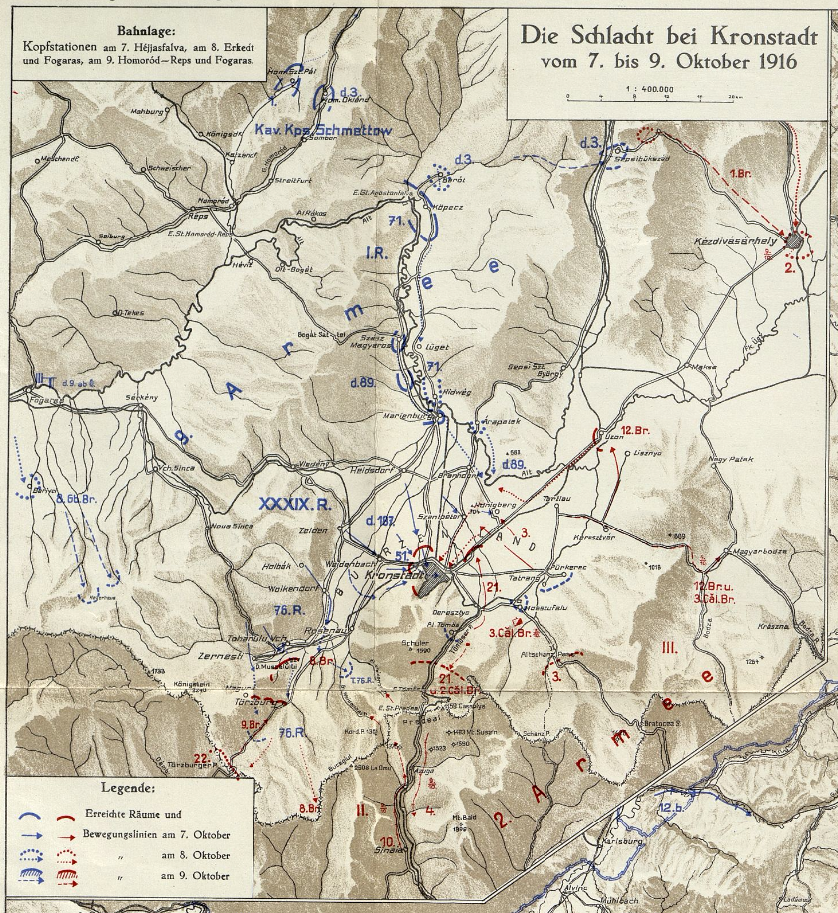
- Map of the battle
Date	7–9 October 1916
Location	Brassó, Austria-Hungary (today Brașov, Romania)
Result	Central Powers victory

Belligerents
Romania	German Empire; Austria-Hungary

Commanders and leaders
(Kingdom of Romania) Grigore Crăiniceanu	(German Empire) Erich von Falkenhayn (German Empire) Edwin Sunkel (German Empire) Curt von Morgen

Units involved
2nd Army (half-strength)	9th Army: German 187th Division; German 89th Division; 51st Honved Division

Casualties and losses
Unknown total 1,175 prisoners 25 guns captured	Unknown

The Battle of Brassó was the last major military engagement during the Battle of Transylvania. It took place between 7 and 9 October 1916, between Central Powers forces (Germany and Austria-Hungary) on one side and Romanian forces on the other side. As Brassó was the second largest city in Transylvania and the largest Transylvanian settlement taken by the Romanians during their August-September offensive in the region, the retreating Romanian forces decided to make a stand there. However, when its defense proved untenable, the Romanian 2nd Army withdrew from the city, leaving behind only 1,175 prisoners. As the Romanians failed to defend Brassó, so did the Central Powers fail to cut off their escape route, enabling the Romanians to regroup and — under better leadership — thwart the German and Austro-Hungarian attempts to break through the mountains in the region throughout the following month.

== Background ==
Romania declared war on Austria-Hungary on 27 August, and two days later it captured Brassó, which — at 41,000 inhabitants — was the second largest city in Transylvania, behind Kolozsvár, which had almost 63,000 inhabitants. German forces soon reinforced the Austro-Hungarians, and the two Central Powers began a counteroffensive in the region in late September. In early October, the Romanian 2nd Army succeeded in thwarting a Central Powers attack, but - instead of exploiting its victory offensively - the Romanians unexpectedly began to retreat, preventing the Central Powers from pinning them down. The defensive line of the half-strength Romanian 2nd Army was broken on 5 October, and the battle for Brassó started on 7 October.

=== Romanian conquest of Brassó (27 – 29 August) ===
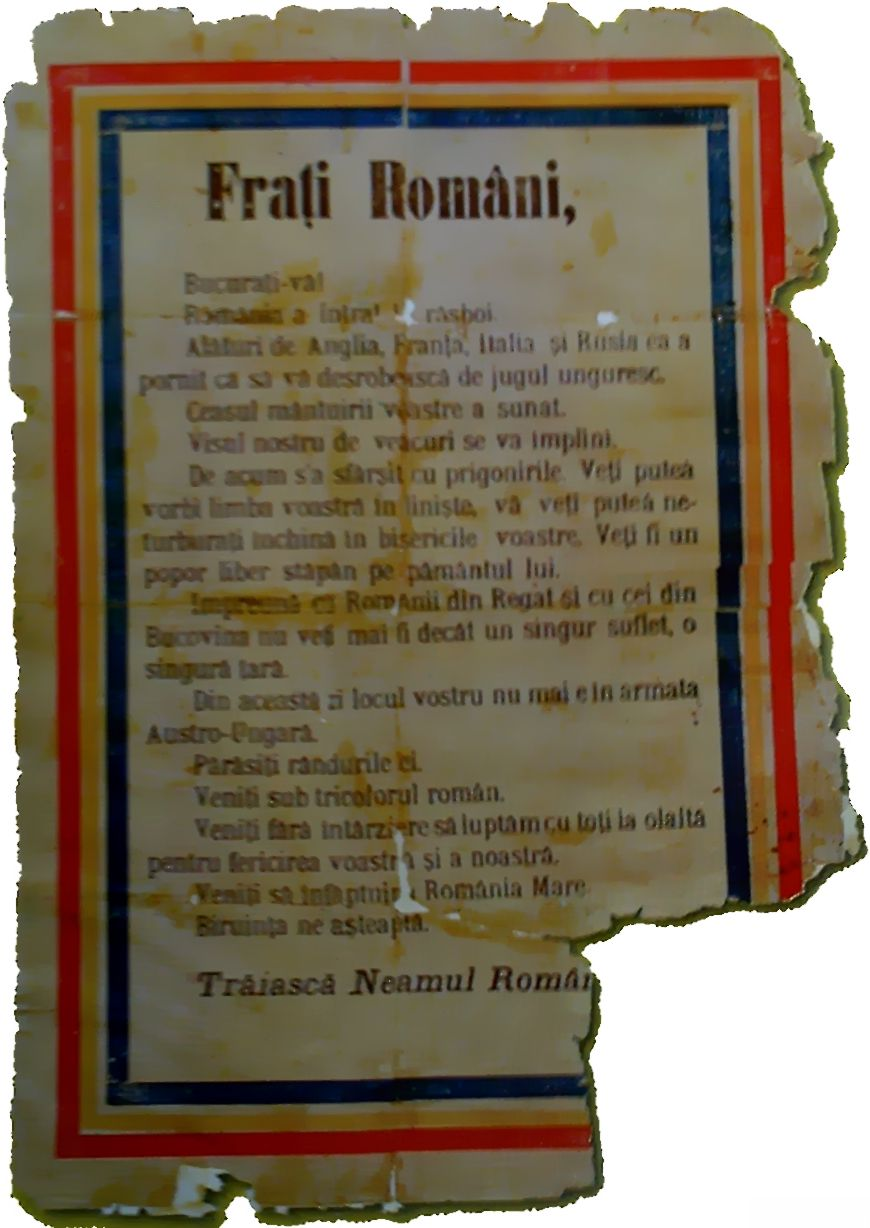
Airborne leaflet dropped by the Romanian Army over Brassó, calling on the local population to support the Romanian offensive

The Romanian 2nd Army, under the command of General Alexandru Averescu, used its covering forces to quickly rout the forces defending the border on the night of 27 August. As they advanced, the Romanians began meeting the forces of the Austro-Hungarian 82nd Infantry Regiment. The regiment's 1st Battalion, assisted by Armored Train IV, stopped three Romanian regiments, holding its ground for the entire day of 28 August, being pushed back only that night. In the west, the 2nd and 3rd Battalions also put up a lively fight, despite running low on ammunition. By nightfall of the 28 August, the 1st Battalion had retreated into Brassó itself. On that same night, Austro-Hungarian government officials withdrew from the city, amid scenes of confusion and suffering. Panicked and desperate Hungarians and Germans attempted to storm trains leaving the city. The Romanians closed in on Brassó in the afternoon of 29 August. Hardly any fighting took place within the city itself, save for Romanian artillery destroying the last train leaving Brassó. That afternoon, a delegation of ethnic Romanians from Brassó surrendered the city to the commander of the Romanian 6th Infantry Regiment. At around 5 pm on that day, Romanian army units entered Brassó, parading to the city square.

=== Further developments (September – October) ===
After taking Brassó, General Averescu was transferred to the command of the Romanian 3rd Army on 7 September. His replacement, Grigore C. Crăiniceanu, was a major downgrade in leadership. Crăiniceanu's appointment caused consternation, as elements of the General Staff did not think he was qualified, and Alexandru Marghiloman — the leader of the Conservative Party — went as far as to say: "How is that possible?...Do not make such a mistake; he has been confused all his life, and he is absolutely worn out." Adding to the 2nd Army's problems, its forces were halved in mid-September when three of its divisions were sent elsewhere. In sharp contrast to Crăiniceanu, Averescu was - according to historian John Buchan - "the ablest of Rumanian generals". At the start of October, after a counterattack which severely mauled the German 89th Division, the Romanians made an unexpected retreat, preventing the Germans from pinning them down. It was only late on 4 October that the Germans reached the Romanian defensive line west of Brassó. The line was located on the western slopes of the Perșani Mountains, in the forest known to the Germans and Austrians as the Geisterwald.

=== Battle of the Geisterwald (5 October) ===
The German 9th Army moved forward to attack the Romanian line in the Geisterwald on 5 October. The initial German attack succeeded in ascending the steep slope without apparent difficulty, but before they could exploit their gains, the Germans had to beat off several powerful Romanian counterattacks. Early on that day, German artillery opened fire in a hellish concert that the Germans have not experienced for a long time. Towards midday, as the German guns were still blazing away at the Romanian fortifications, the Romanians launched a counterattack. Reckless, death-defying groups repeatedly filled the wide holes torn into their lines by the German artillery, which was so powerful that three Romanian counterattacks were completely crushed. German artillery fire rose to a crescendo during the afternoon, as the Germans stormed the heights against no more opposition. The Romanians who were still alive threw away their weapons in fear. The attacking German companies stormed a bloody and gruesome defence line: churned up ground, shattered corpses, the dead and the groaning wounded, along with the survivors who had held on to the last. Despite the destructive fire, some Romanians advanced with admirable tenacity and determination. Relatively few pushed to within 50 meters of the railway embankment, where they were killed by accurate rifle and machine gun fire. On the night of 5 October, the Geisterwald was lost by the Romanians. Crăiniceanu's growing panic was evidenced by his hasty retreat through the Geisterwald. Panic had completely taken hold of him, and his staff thought he had lost his mind. Retreating from the forest, the Romanians left behind a few hundred prisoners and 48 guns of varying sizes. On 6 October, official reports from Bucharest for the first time abandoned their tone of confidence, announcing that in Southern Transylvania the Romanian Army was retiring before superior forces.

== Battle ==
As 9th Army approached Brassó on 7 October, some elements ran into defensive positions. After German artillery broke up a determined Romanian counterattack, elements of the 187th Infantry Division (two regiments) penetrated into the northern part of the city, where they encountered further determined resistance and counterattacks throughout the following night. The next morning, when the fog lifted, the soldiers of the 187th Regiment realized that enemy soldiers were located between them and the rest of their division. Walls of Romanian infantry stood between General Edwin Sunkel's two regiments in Brassó and the 187th Regiment. Well-aimed artillery fire quickly dissolved the Romanian formations, but they soon reformed and began to advance, despite the holes appearing in their skirmish lines as the artillery shells landed. The Romanian riflemen advanced steadily towards Barcaszentpéter (Sânpetru), until they were halted by German machine guns and small arms. The Romanians withdrew to their initial positions, save for a few who found cover in cornfields, from where they could not be dislodged despite repeated attempts. The Romanians did not retreat any further, but neither did they resume their attack. Inside Brassó, house-to-house battles raged, as the two German regiments in the city were engaged in a bitter struggle in the outskirts of the city. Powerful Romanian counterattacks repeatedly failed. Early on 8 October, the 51st Honvéd Infantry Division moved up in support and attacked the heights which dominated the western and northern parts of Brassó. Accompanied by a brigade from the Honvéd Division, the Germans and Hungarians slowly scattered several Romanian battalions. At around 3 pm, heavy gunfire was heard from the north. General Curt von Morgen's 89th Division had finally arrived and was attacking the Romanians surrounding Barcaszentpéter, although it failed to press all the way to the village. The 89th Division never got its act together: destroyed bridges, poor reconnaissance and minor Romanian resistance all contributed to its slow progress. The soldiers were tired, and the commanders were unaware of the opportunity: attacking immediately would have exposed the Romanian divisions besieging the village to a partial crossfire. Instead, after firing off a few shots, the German infantry began to set up camp. By the end of the 8th, it was clear to the Romanians that Brassó could not be held, and rear area units were ordered to withdraw, followed by the rearguard. The Germans watched the Romanians retreat throughout the night from their vantage points in and around the city, trying to keep them under machine gun fire. Trains fully loaded with military materiel and war plunder were abandoned, as was a train full of soldiers. As soon as it was daylight, the 187th Infantry Regiment marched into the city. The bells in all the town's towers rang victory.

=== "Death trench" at the Bertalan railway station ===
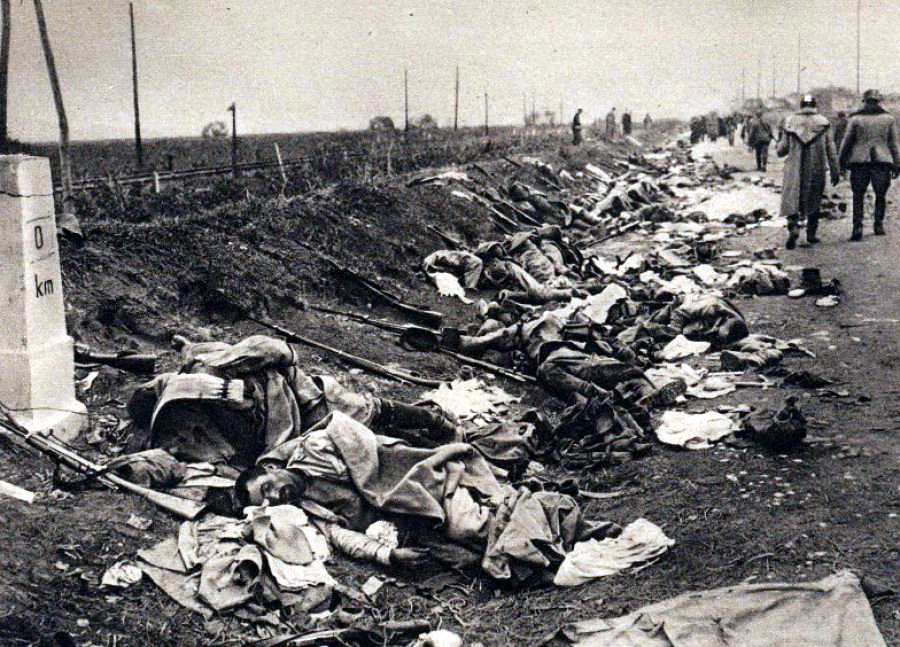
Fallen Romanian soldiers at the Bertalan railway station

To the right of the Brassó-Bertalan train station, a company of 168 soldiers from the 24th Infantry Regiment (Tecuci) had dug in for 200 metres (660 ft) along the railroad in order to defend the city from an attack coming from Méheskert. The entire company had only a machine gun available. In the heat of the battle, the Romanian soldiers didn't notice that their left flank was completely open. German reconnaissance discovered quickly the weak spot and, using darkness to their advantage, a machine gun section of the 189th Regiment quietly sneaked into a ruined depot, 5 metres (16 ft) away from the Romanian trench, while other German soldiers with hand grenades took position behind the Romanians. In two-three minutes the Germans mowed down the whole company of 168 soldiers. A German war correspondent described the scene afterwards: "The dead company lies now in dirt, by the roadside. Man to man they lie down, as they fell on the battle day under the terrifying fire of the machine guns, with a look of dread imprinted on their pale faces and with spread out hands, as if they tried to defend themselves from the misfortune that had befallen them".

Lajos Szádeczky-Kardoss, who was on the scene the next day as a war correspondent, described the scene as follows: “Arriving at the Bertalan station in Brassó, a terribly interesting sight appeared before us on the road next to the railway: the famous “line of the Vlach deads”. 250 corpses lay there next to each other, who had been sprayed with fire by Székely machine gunners from the window of the railway engine house on the morning of Oct. 8th, exactly 24 hours before, and had been lying there untouched since then. It was a terrible battle scene: at the bottom of the railway embankment, 2-300 meters long, there were corpses with distorted faces, stiffened, lying crosswise, in various positions, as if the bullet had unexpectedly found them. One was tying his peasant sandal, the other was putting an onion in his mouth during his breakfast snack, the third was holding his head with his arm raised. The fourth – the most horrific sight – was shot with an empty skull, the brains of which had flown out in his raised hand. If I hadn’t seen it, I wouldn’t have believed it myself. I asked several times about its explanation. To this day, I still don’t understand how he could have been shot and what could have caused the terrible effect. As I walk among them, a machine gun squad marches along the road, and one of them, an ensign I know from Kolozsvár, proudly shouts, “Uncle Lajos, we did it!” “You are fine lads,” I replied, “you Székely 24s didn’t regret shooting the Vlachs 24s.” Because everyone had the number 24 on their caps. (...) This was the opening and sensation of the Battle of Brassó, around which a whole circle of legends has formed. The Germans soon seized it for themselves, and they also announced it in their books, although they only had a part in it that they were lying opposite them behind the railway embankment, but the commander of the 24th Székely machine gun squad, Lieutenant Lajos Cseh, discovered them and shot them sideways from the window of the railway engine house. He wrote his novel story himself and gave it to me. (I published it in the magazine “Greater Hungary”).”

== Aftermath ==
The battle for Brassó was over. The Germans had captured 1,175 prisoners and 25 artillery pieces. Erich von Falkenhayn, observing the fighting from a church steeple in Feketehalom (Codlea), sent several messages to von Morgen, urging him to keep moving. On the morning of the 9th, von Falkenhayn stormed into von Morgen's headquarters at Földvár (Feldioara) and made his displeasure clear, ordering the 89th Division to "stay glued to the retreating enemy". However, hindered as much by poor roads and difficult terrain as by Romanian resistance, the Germans were unable to cut off the escape route.

The Battle of Brassó lasted two days, from 7 to 9 October 1916. The German failure to cut off the escape route of the Romanians would have serious consequences for the Central Powers. General Alexandru Averescu, who had returned to the command of the 2nd Army after the end of the battle, would successfully defeat the Central Powers during the Battle of Predeal Pass. His defence would turn out to be brilliant, as by the first days of November, the Central Powers had not advanced more than 4 miles (6.4 km) across the Romanian border. On the Romanian side, the last major location captured by the Romanians during their initial advance into Transylvania was back in the control of the Central Powers, causing morale in Bucharest to further plummet. Chaotic preparations began to move the seat of Government to the east and some began to question the wisdom of going to war with the Central Powers, resulting in suggestions to seek a separate peace. However, the Romanian King and Prime Minister were determined to fight on. Despite the "disappointing" haul of prisoners, Falkenhayn was confident that he had inflicted enough damage on the Romanian 2nd Army that it would not be able to seriously resist him, even with reinforcements. General Averescu would render Falkenhayn's confidence unfounded throughout the following month.

Romania was the only minor power during World War I which managed to invade the territory of a European Great Power and hold one of said Great Power's cities, with tens of thousands of inhabitants, for over one month (29 August to 7 October), including one entire calendar month (September 1916). It is difficult to find anything to compare this to, given that minor powers could hardly invade Great Powers. During the war, Bulgaria invaded Serbia (Morava Offensive, Ovče Pole Offensive), Romania (Battle of Turtucaia, Battle of Bazargic) and Albania (Bulgarian occupation of Albania), but all of these were minor powers. One somewhat comparable example was the Serbian invasion of the Syrmia region of the Austro-Hungarian Bosnia. On 6 September 1914, Field Marshal Radomir Putnik ordered the Serbian 1st Army to cross the Sava River into Austro-Hungarian Syrmia. By 11 September, the Serbs had penetrated 20 miles into Austro-Hungarian territory. On that same day, however, the Serbian advance faltered, and by 14 September the Serbs had evacuated Syrmia.
