= Graham Gardiner =

Australian rower

Personal information
- Nickname: Greenthumbs

Sport
- Sport: Rowing
- Club: Glebe Rowing Club; Drummoyne Rowing Club; Balmain Rowing Club
Medal record
Men's rowing
Representing Australia
World Rowing Championships
Gold medal – first place	1980 Hazewinkel	LM4-
Gold medal – first place	1981 Munich	LM4-

Graham Gardiner is an Australian former lightweight rower. He is a two-time World Champion.

== Club and state rowing ==
Gardiner's commenced his senior rowing with the Glebe Rowing Club and competed in a men's junior 4+ at the 1979 Australian Rowing Championships. The following year he shifted to the Drummoyne Rowing Club in Sydney and won two national titles - the lightweight M2- with Clyde Hefer and the lightweight M4- with Hefer, Michael Smith and Graeme Wearne. In 1981 in those same two crews Gardiner again raced for those national titles but this time representing the Balmain Rowing Club and both to 2nd place.

== National representative rowing ==
Gardiner was selected for Australian representative honours in a LM4- for the 1980 World Rowing Championships in Hazewinkel - a lightweight only championship being an Olympic year. With Hefer he'd vied for top national honours throughout 1980 against the Victorian pair of Charles Bartlett and Simon Gillett. New Australian National Coaching Director Reinhold Batschi had introduced a small boat racing selection methodology and the choice of the two competitively matched pairs to comprise the Australian IV was clear. The crew took the gold medal and won Australia's second lightweight World Championship title. The following year in the same crew Gardiner raced at the 1981 World Rowing Championships in Munich and they successfully defended their title.
