= Winston Stephens =

New Zealand rower

Medal record

Men's rowing

Representing New Zealand

British Empire Games
Gold medal – first place	1962 Perth	Coxed four

Winston Stephens is a former New Zealand rower.

At the 1962 British Empire and Commonwealth Games he won the gold medal as part of the men's coxed four alongside fellow Waitaki Boys' High School crew members Keith Heselwood, George Paterson, and Hugh Smedley, plus Waikato cox Doug Pulman. Their coach was Rusty Robertson.
