= Charles Bartlett (rower) =

Australian former lightweight rower

Personal information
- Years active: 1973–1984

Sport
- Sport: Rowing
- Club: Melbourne University Boat Club
Medal record
Men's rowing
Representing Australia
World Rowing Championships
Gold medal – first place	1980 Hazewinkel	Lwt men's four
Gold medal – first place	1981 Munich	Lwt men's four

Charles Bartlett is an Australian former lightweight rower. He is a two-time World Champion, was a selector of Australian Olympic and world championship representative crews and has been a senior rowing administrator at state and national levels.

== Rowing career ==
Bartlett's senior rowing started from the Melbourne University Boat Club in 1973.

He had raced at only two National Championships - 1979 and 1980 - and made only one State crew (Victoria's 1979 lightweight coxless four) when he was selected for Australian representative honours in a LM4- for the 1980 World Rowing Championships in Hazewinkel – a lightweight-only championship being an Olympic year. With his Victorian lightweight pair partner Simon Gillett he'd vied for top national honours throughout the 1980 season against the New South Wales pair of Graham Gardiner and Clyde Hefer. New Australian National Coaching Director Reinhold Batschi had just introduced a small boat racing selection methodology and the choice of the two competitive pairs to comprise the Australian coxless four was clear. The crew took the gold medal and won Australia's second lightweight World Championship title. The following year the same crew raced at the 1981 World Rowing Championships in Munich and successfully defended their title.

== Selector and rowing administrator ==
Bartlett was president of the Melbourne University Boat Club from 1991 to 1996. After relocating to Sydney he joined the Leichhardt Rowing Club in 2001 and he became president of the Leichhardt Club from 2012 to 2018.

He was a committee member of the Victorian Rowing Association from 1985 to 1999, a councillor for Victoria on the ARC from 1996 to 1998 and a Rowing Australia board member from 1999 to 2000. He was a board member of Rowing New South Wales from 2005 to 2009.

He was a national selector for Australian World Championship squads from 2001 to 2007 and a selector for the Australian Olympic squad for the 2004 Games.
