= George Paterson (rower) =

New Zealand rower (1940–2020)

Personal information
- Born: 6 November 1940 Milton, New Zealand
- Died: 26 July 2020 (aged 79) Christchurch, New Zealand
- Height: 1.84 m (6 ft 0 in)
- Weight: 83 kg (183 lb)
- Relative: Gary Robertson (brother-in-law)

Sport
- Country: New Zealand
- Sport: Rowing
Medal record
Representing New Zealand
British Empire Games
Gold medal – first place	1962 Perth	Coxed four

George Murray Paterson (6 November 1940 – 26 July 2020) was a New Zealand rower.

At the 1962 British Empire and Commonwealth Games he won the gold medal as part of the coxed four event alongside fellow Waitaki Boys' High School crew members Keith Heselwood, Hugh Smedley and Winston Stephens, plus Waikato cox Doug Pulman. Their coach was Rusty Robertson.

Paterson competed at the 1964 Olympics in the men's eight event. His brother-in-law Gary Robertson is also a retired Olympic rower.

Paterson died in Christchurch on 26 July 2020.
