= Terry Davies =

Terry or Terence Davies may refer to:

- Terry Davies (rugby union) (1933–2021), Welsh international rugby player
- Terry Davies (cricketer) (born 1960), English cricketer
- Terry Davies (rower) (1933–2022), Australian Olympic rower
- Terry Davies (sprinter) (born 1942), Welsh sprinter
- Terence Davies (1945–2023), English screenwriter

== See also ==
- Terry Davis (disambiguation)
