= Bartolomeu railway station =

Bartolomeu
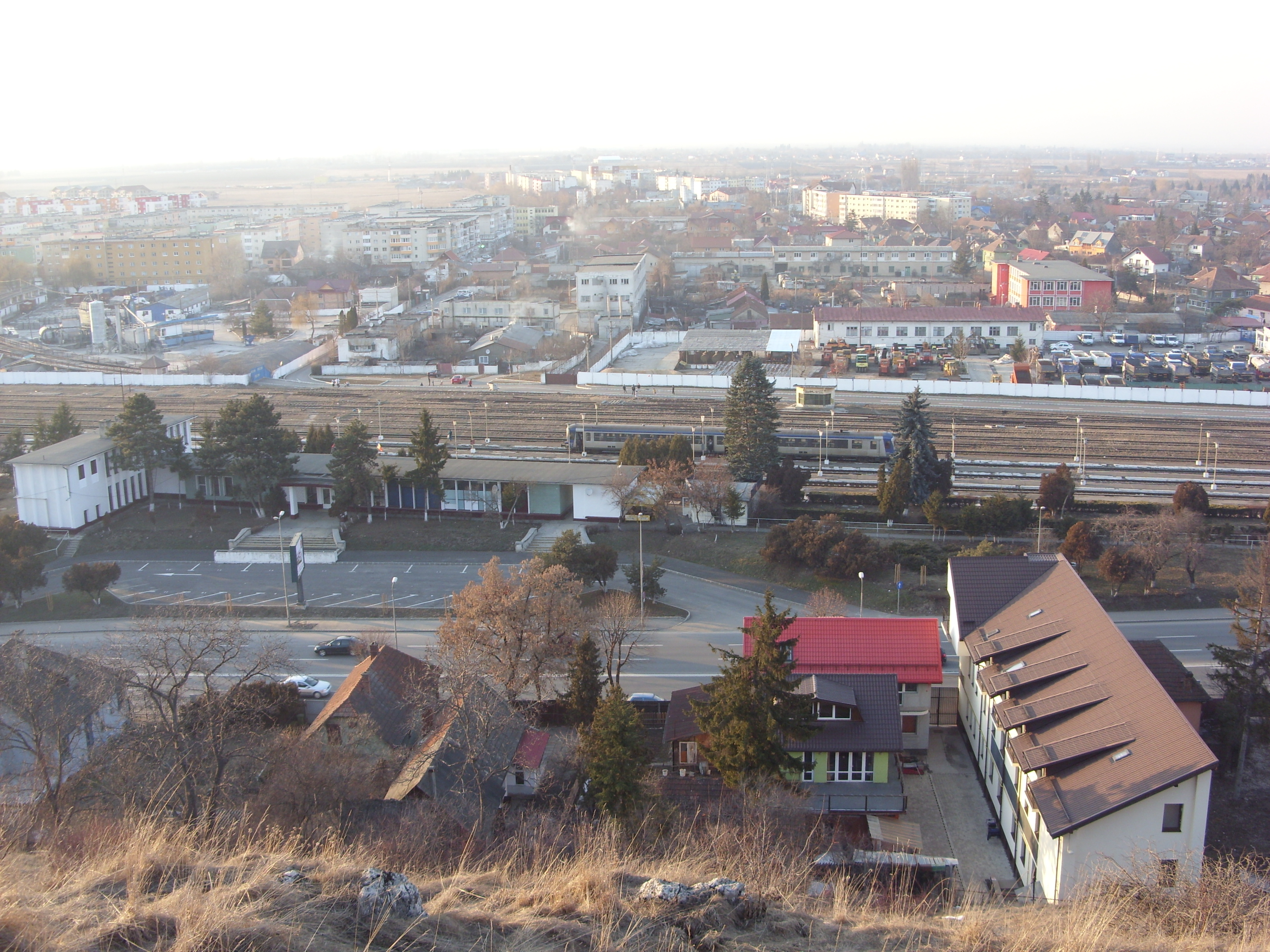
- New station building

General information
- Location: Calea Făgărașului nr. 2, Brașov, Romania
- Coordinates: 45.6626°N 25.5745°E
- Owner: CFR
- Lines: 200 Brașov–Făgăraș–Sibiu; 203 Brașov–Zărnești
- Platforms: 4
- Tracks: 10

Construction
- Structure type: junction
- Platform levels: 1
- Parking: yes

History
- Opened: 1891
- Rebuilt: ~1966

Services
Preceding station	CFR	Following station
Ghimbav towards Arad	CFR Intercity 200	Brașov towards București Nord
Cristian towards Zărnești	CFR Intercity 203	Brașov Terminus
Location

Bartolomeu railway station (Romanian: Gara Bartolomeu) is a railway station in the North-West part of Brașov, Romania.

== Name and etymology ==
The station takes its name from the surrounding neighborhood, which in turn was named after Saint Bartholomew Church, the oldest standing church in Brașov, dedicated to one of the twelve apostles. In other languages it is called:

- Hungarian: Bertalan/Brassó-Bertalan
- German: Bartholomä/(Kronstädter) Westbahnhof

== History ==
The station's history is closely tied to the establishment and exploitation of the Brașov–Zărnești local railway. The line and its dependencies were built by a company named "Brassó-Háromszéki Helyi Érdekű Vasutak" (BHHÉV), established in 1890. The station was inaugurated on 6 June 1891 and the first official train passed through it on 13 June 1891.

From the very beginning, the exploitation of the line and thus the station was undertaken by MÁV, the Hungarian Royal State Railways. From 1919 on, it was continued by CFR, the Romanian State Railway Company, who nationalized the line in 1932.

Between 7 March 1892 and 16 mai 1933 it was also the terminus station of the Brașov–Satulung suburban railway and, from 27 September 1908 on, a station on the Brașov–Făgăraș–Sibiu railway.

In its first years, the station had only three-four tracks, a small warehouse with a platform and a small locomotive depot, with water supply and a turntable. The main building had a hallway, a waiting room for the first and second classes, a ticket sales office, and two rooms for the personnel's office. In 1908 it was extended sideways to include a third class waiting room and an apartment for the station master. The latrines were outside. The personnel consisted of a station master, a station supervisor and two switchmen.

On 9 October 1916, during the World War I Battle of Brașov, a Romanian company from the 24th Infantry Regiment defending the railway station was surprised by a machine gun section of the German 189th Regiment and completely wiped out.

In 1964–1966 a new, larger station building was erected to the South-West of the old one and the tracks were extended to 10 in 1972–1973. Centralized traffic control was also introduced in 1964.

Starting in 2005, private rail company Regiotrans was granted exclusivity on the Brașov–Zărnești railway.

== Current status ==
As of 2017, 29 passenger trains are stopping in this station, all but one being low speed local trains. Of those, 18 belong to Regiotrans, the rest to CFR. Seven CFR InterRegio passenger trains pass through the station without stopping. There is also goods traffic present.

== Gallery ==
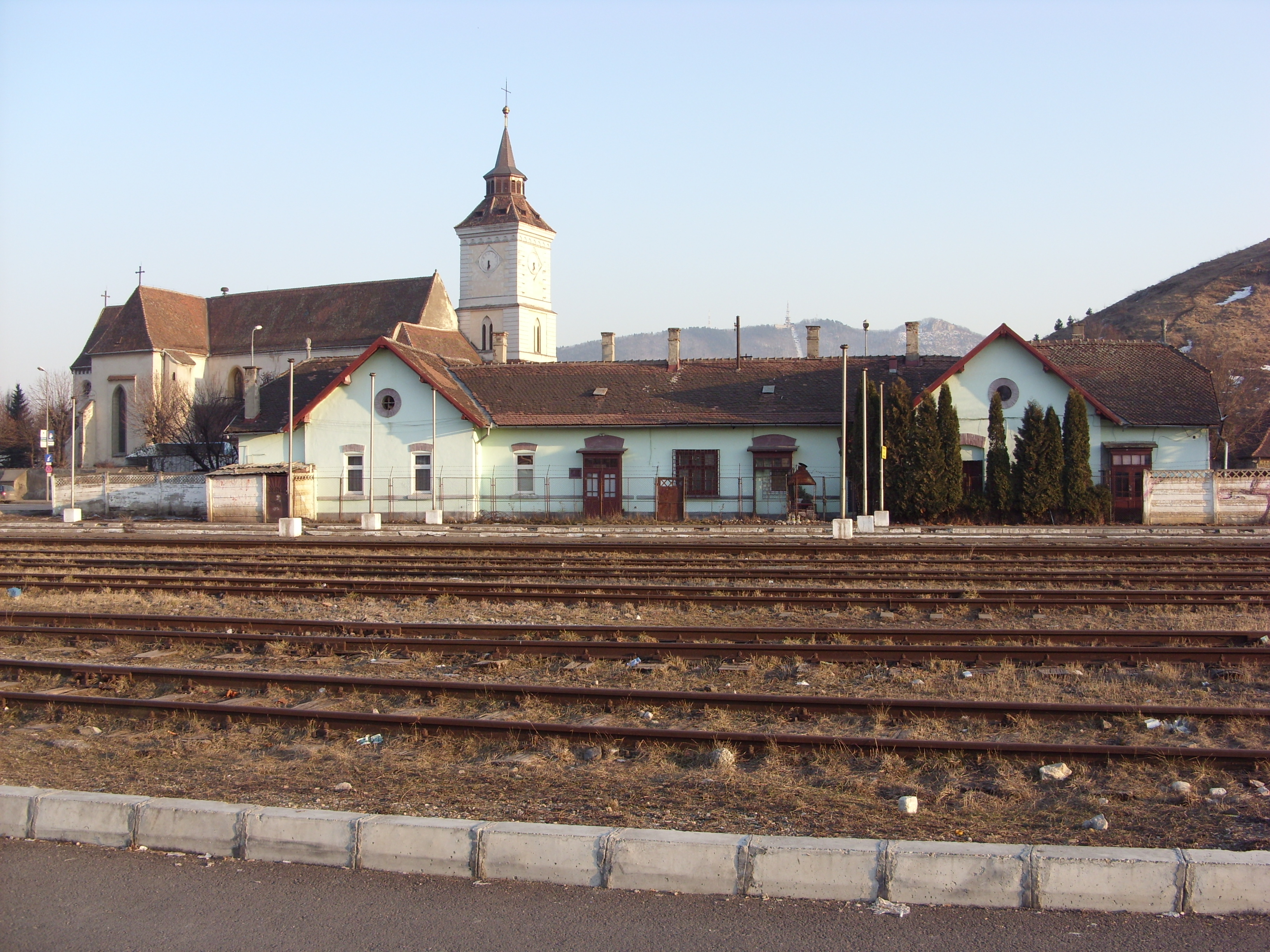
Old station and St Bartholomew church

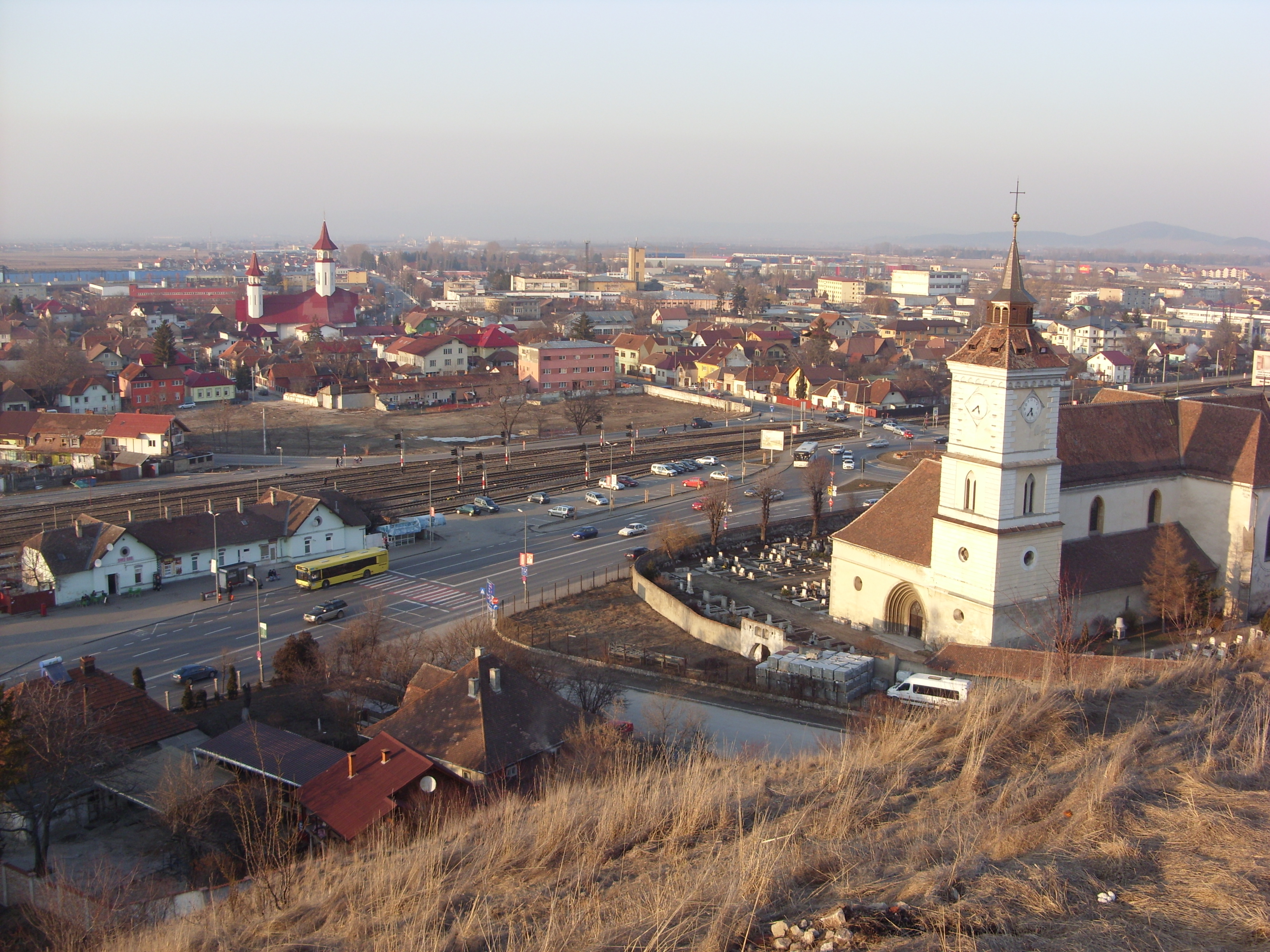
Old station and St Bartholomew church

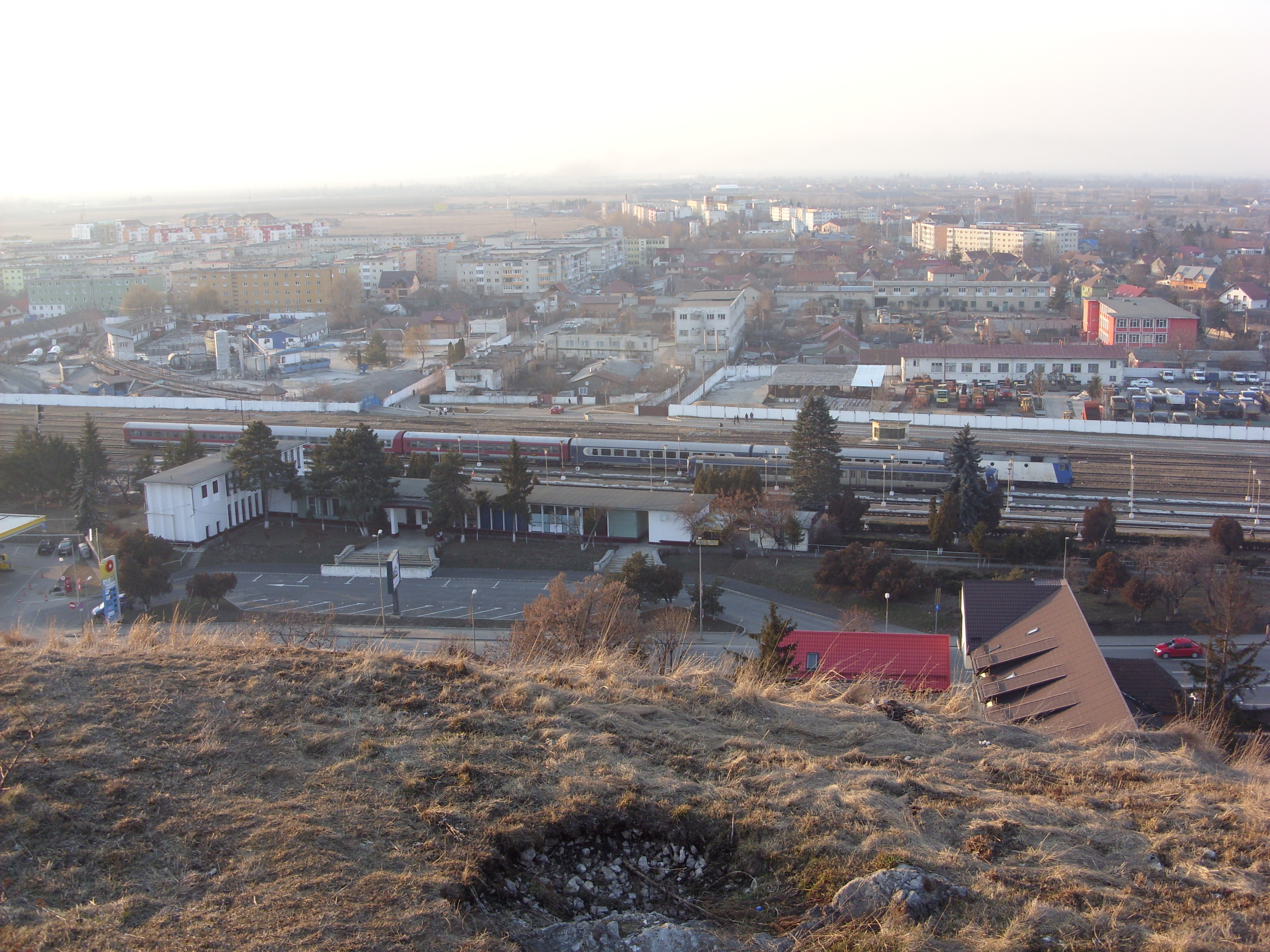
New Bartolomeu station with a CFR train

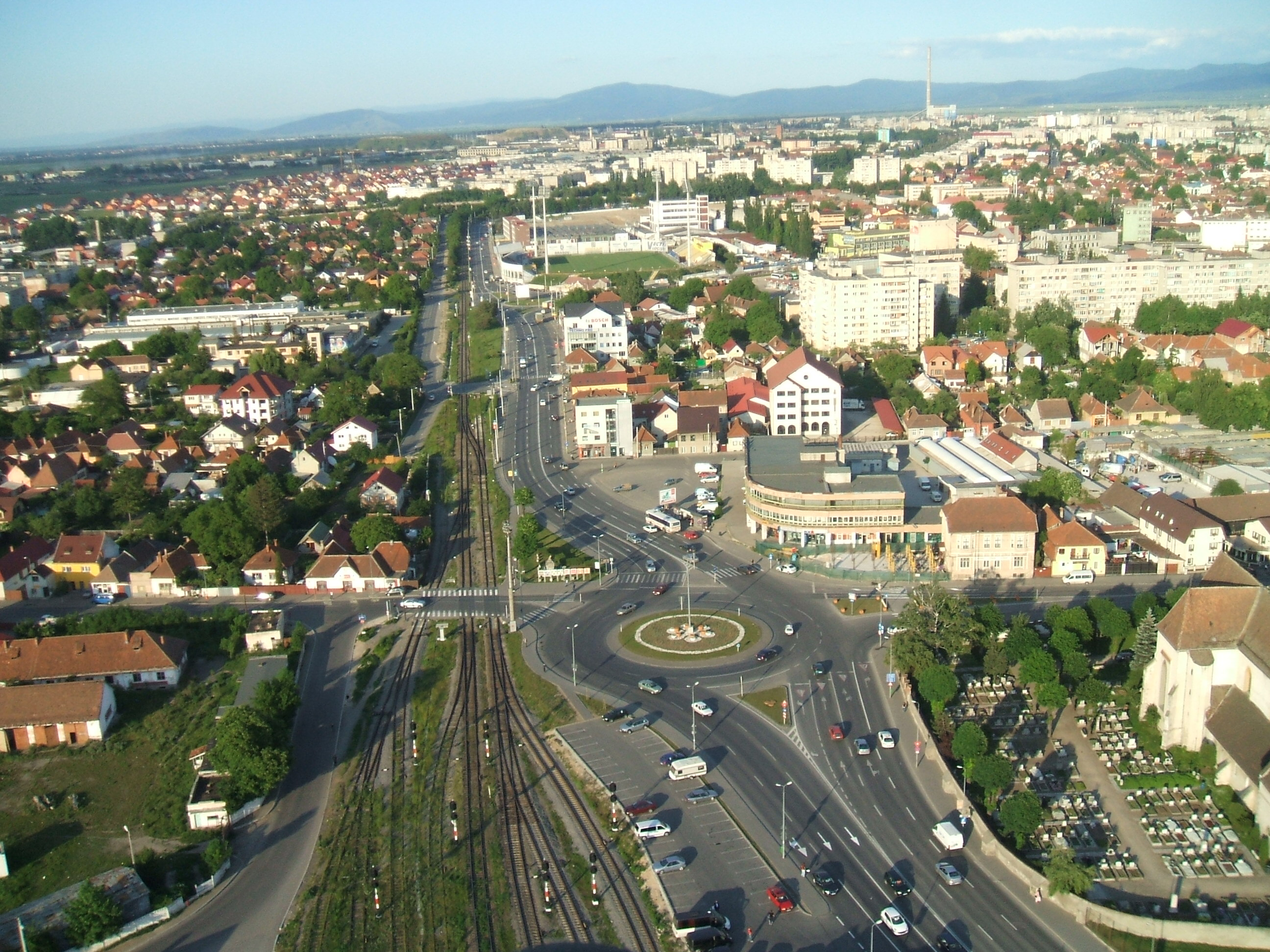
Overview of the station towards its exit to Brașov railway station

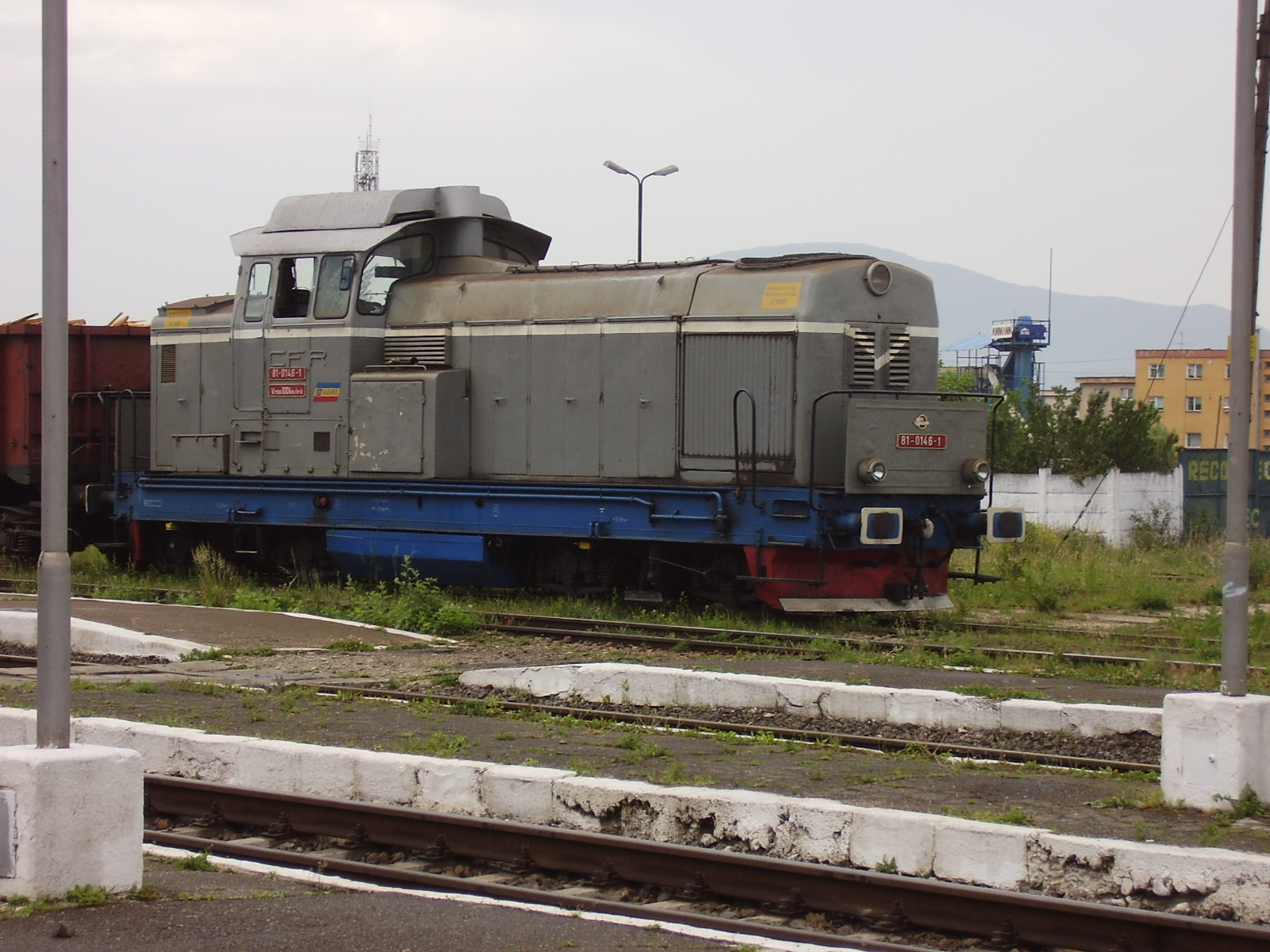
Diesel locomotive in Bartolomeu station, 2007

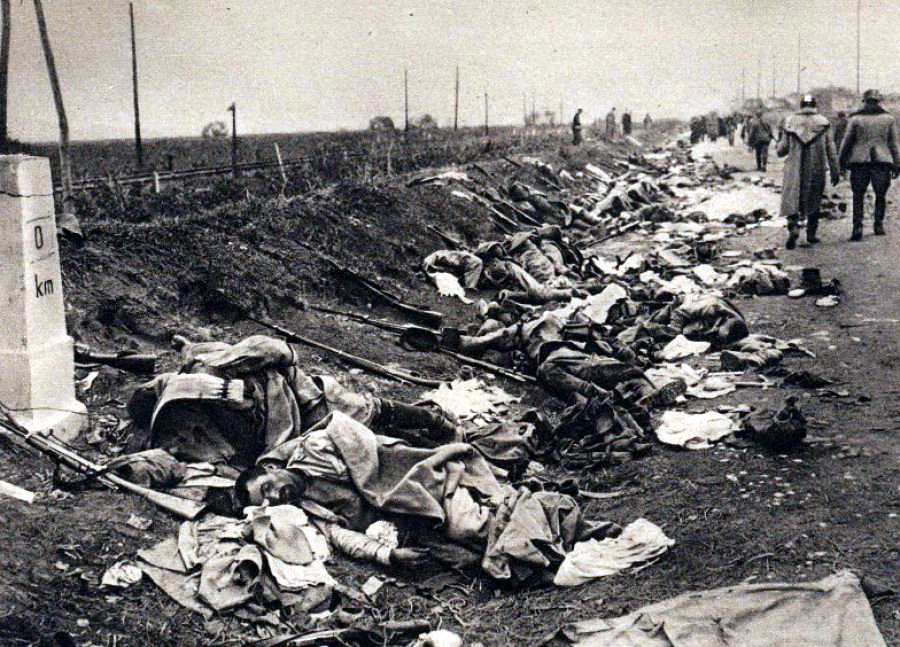
Fallen Romanian soldiers at the Bartolomeu railway station, during the Battle of Brașov (1916)

== See also ==
- Brașov railway station
- List of railway stations in Romania
