= Keith Heselwood =

New Zealand rower

Medal record

Men's rowing

Representing New Zealand

British Empire Games
Gold medal – first place	1962 Perth	Coxed four

Keith Heselwood (1940-2020) was a New Zealand rower.

At the 1962 British Empire and Commonwealth Games he won the gold medal as part of the men's coxed four alongside fellow Waitaki Boys' High School crew members George Paterson, Hugh Smedley and Winston Stephens, plus Waikato cox Doug Pulman. Their coach was Rusty Robertson.

Heselwood died in 2020.
