= Hugh Smedley =

New Zealand rower

Medal record

Men's rowing

Representing New Zealand

British Empire Games
| Gold medal – first place | 1962 Perth | Coxed four |

Hugh Smedley (1937-2022) was a New Zealand rower.

At the 1962 British Empire and Commonwealth Games he won the gold medal as part of the men's coxed four alongside fellow Waitaki Boys' High School crew members Keith Heselwood, George Paterson, and Winston Stephens, plus Waikato cox Doug Pulman. Their coach was Rusty Robertson.

Smedley died in 2022.
