= Simon Gillett (rower) =

Australian rower

Personal information
- Years active: 1975–1982

Sport
- Sport: Rowing
- Club: Melbourne University Boat Club
Medal record
Men's rowing
Representing Australia
World Rowing Championships
Gold medal – first place	1980 Hazewinkel	Lwt four
Gold medal – first place	1981 Munich	Lwt four
Silver medal – second place	1977 Amsterdam	Lwt four
Bronze medal – third place	1978 Copenhagen	Lwt four

Simon Gillett is an Australian former lightweight rower. He is a two-time world champion, was a selector of Australian Olympic and world championship representative crews and is a former head coach of Australian rowing.

== Club and state rowing ==
Gillett's senior rowing started from the Melbourne University Boat Club in 1975. He was selected in the Victorian state representative Youth eight to race the Noel Wilkinson trophy at the Australian Rowing Championships in 1975 and 1976 and saw victory in both years.

Gillett was selected in Victorian state representative lightweight fours to race the Penrith Cup at the Australian Rowing Championships for six consecutive years 1977 to 1982. Those crews won the interstate championship in 1977, 1978 and 1979.

Representing Melbourne University Gillett also competed for national titles at each Australian Rowing Championship from six consecutive years 1977 to 1982. He rowed to victory in the national champion LM4- in 1977, 1978, 1979; took the national LM8+ title in 1978, 1980, 1981 and won the national LM2- title in 1981.

== National representative rowing ==
Gillett was first selected for Australian representative honours in a LM4- for the Amsterdam 1977 which won silver. The following year that crew with bowman Colin Smith replaced by Vaughan Bollen raced at the Copenhagen 1978 and took bronze. He stroked an Australian lightweight eight at Bled 1979 to sixth place.

He was selected for further representative honours in a LM4- for the 1980 World Rowing Championships in Hazewinkel – a lightweight only championship being an Olympic year. With his Victorian lightweight pair partner Charles Bartlett he'd vied for top national honours throughout 1980 against the New South Wales lightweight pair of Graham Gardiner and Clyde Hefer. New Australian National Coaching Director Reinhold Batschi had just introduced a small boat racing selection methodology and the choice of the two competitively matched pairs to comprise the Australian IV was clear. The crew took the gold medal and won Australia's second lightweight world championship title. The following year the same crew raced at the 1981 World Rowing Championships in Munich and successfully defended their title.

== Selector and coach ==
Immediately following his competitive retirement Gillett was appointed as a national selector. He was a selector for the Australian rowing squads picked for Duisburg 1983, the 1984 Summer Olympics, the 1988 Summer Olympics, Bled 1989, Lake Barrington 1990 and Vienna 1991.

From 1991 until 1994 Gillett was a senior coach in Adelaide and coached South Australian men's and women's, lightweight and open, sweep oared and sculling state representative crews. His South Australian crews who won the Interstate Championships at the Australian Rowing Championships were a 1991 Women's Youth IV; a 1993 Men's LW IV and Women's Youth IV; a 1994 Women's Open IV and Men's LW IV. When some of those South Australian crews were selected as Australian representatives he coached them to world junior championships or world championships. Junior world champions coached by Simon Gillett include Alison Davies and Victoria Toogood (1992 W2-); Amy Safe and Peta Coudraye (1993 W2-); Amy Safe (1994 W1X)

Gillett was head coach of Australian rowing in 1994 and 1995.
