= Battle of Predeal Pass =

World War I battle

Coordinates: 45°30′46″N 25°34′20″E

- Part of the Battle of the Southern Carpathians of the Romanian Campaign of World War I
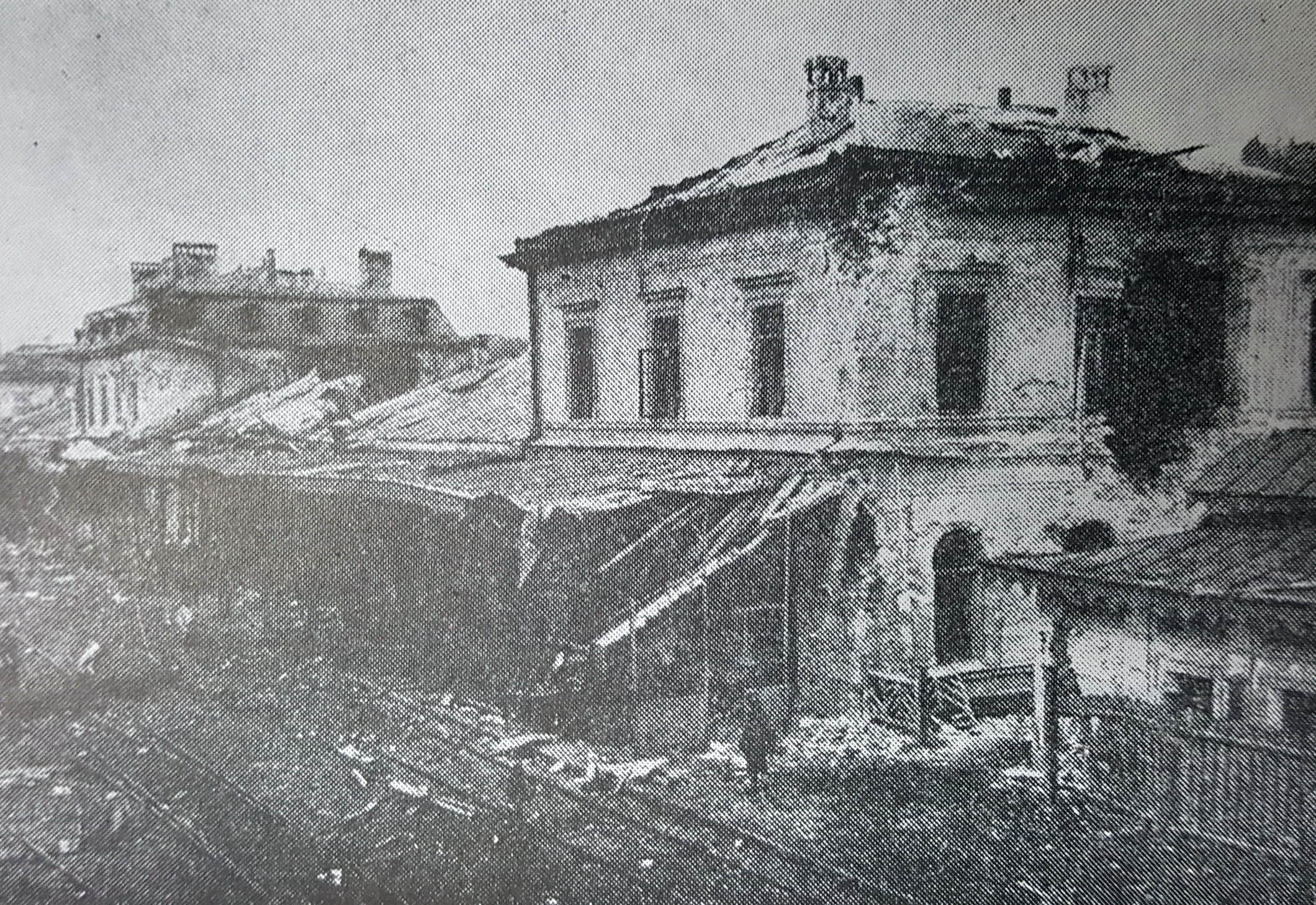
- Predeal railway station destroyed by the artillery of the Central Powers
Date	12 October – 10 November 1916
Location	Predeal and Predeal Pass, on the border of Hungary and Romania
Result	Romanian victory

Belligerents
Romania	German Empire; Austria-Hungary

Commanders and leaders
(Kingdom of Romania) Alexandru Averescu	(German Empire) Hermann von Staabs

Units involved
2nd Army	XXXIX Reserve Corps

Casualties and losses
Unknown	Unknown

The Battle of Predeal Pass (Hungarian: Tömösi-szorosi csata, German: Schlacht am Tömöser Pass) was a military engagement during the Romanian Campaign of World War I. It consisted in an attempt by the Central Powers (Germany and Austria-Hungary) to cross the mountains to the south of Brassó (Brașov). Although the Central Powers captured the town of Predeal itself, the Romanian defenses in the pass prevented any further advances.

== Background ==
Following the Battle of Brassó (Brașov), General Alexandru Averescu arrived in the region to assume command of the Romanian 2nd Army, replacing General Grigore C. Crăiniceanu. Averescu had orders to defend a line which would stop the Germans from entering the passes that led into central Romania. However, Averescu pragmatically rejected this. Instead, he insisted on withdrawing within the passes themselves, where the German superiority in artillery could be greatly reduced. The Central Powers forces in the area consisted in the XXXIX Corps, under the command of General Hermann von Staabs. The Corps comprised the German 187th Division under General Edwin Sunkel, the 51st Honvéd Division and the 76th Reserve Division. The two main units of the Corps - the 187th Infantry Division and the 51st Honvéd Infantry Division - had just won the Battle of Brassó (Brașov).

== Battle ==
The Germans and Austro-Hungarians began their artillery bombardment of the frontier heights south of Brassó on 12 October. Infantry fighting followed the bombardment on 14 October, but the Central Powers thus far had achieved very little. In capturing the frontier heights, the Central Powers found themselves in Romanian crossfire from the surrounding forests to the west and the Clăbucetul heights from the east. On 20 October, the Central Powers attempted an outflanking attack to the west of the Romanian positions, which failed completely. Resuming their slow and steady frontal operations, the Central Powers pushed on towards the town of Predeal. On 23 October, after an entire day of fighting, the Germans and Austro-Hungarians captured the town's railway station, but it was not until two days later that the last Romanian units withdrew from the southern outskirts of Predeal. The Predeal Pass was protected near its northern entrance by the town of Predeal, which was subjected to a heavy German artillery bombardment in mid-October. The town itself was ultimately seized in heavy fighting, but the Romanian defenders pulled back into the pass itself. Inside the pass they took up positions that could not be broken. The terrain greatly restricted the use of artillery, removing the main asset of the Central Powers. Both sides resorted to frontal attacks, which resulted in steadily amounting losses but had no impact on the front line. On 13 October, an Austro-Hungarian attack in the Pass was repulsed. On 25 October, the town of Predeal itself fell. On 3 November, the Romanians were again on Transylvanian soil, after thrusting back the Austro-Hungarians in the Tabla Buții Pass. By 10 November, the Romanians were forced to withdraw to a point not far from Tabla Buții, but nonetheless they were holding their ground, in addition to making slight gains in the Prahova Valley. After taking Mount Roșca from the Austro-Hungarians, the Romanians lost it again to the latter on 5 November. On 6 November, the Austro-Hungarians took the highest peak of the Buzău Mountains. On 22 November, the Russian General Staff proclaimed Falkenhayn's failure at Predeal, stating that he could only overrun Wallachia, instead of cutting it off in a pincer movement.

== Aftermath ==
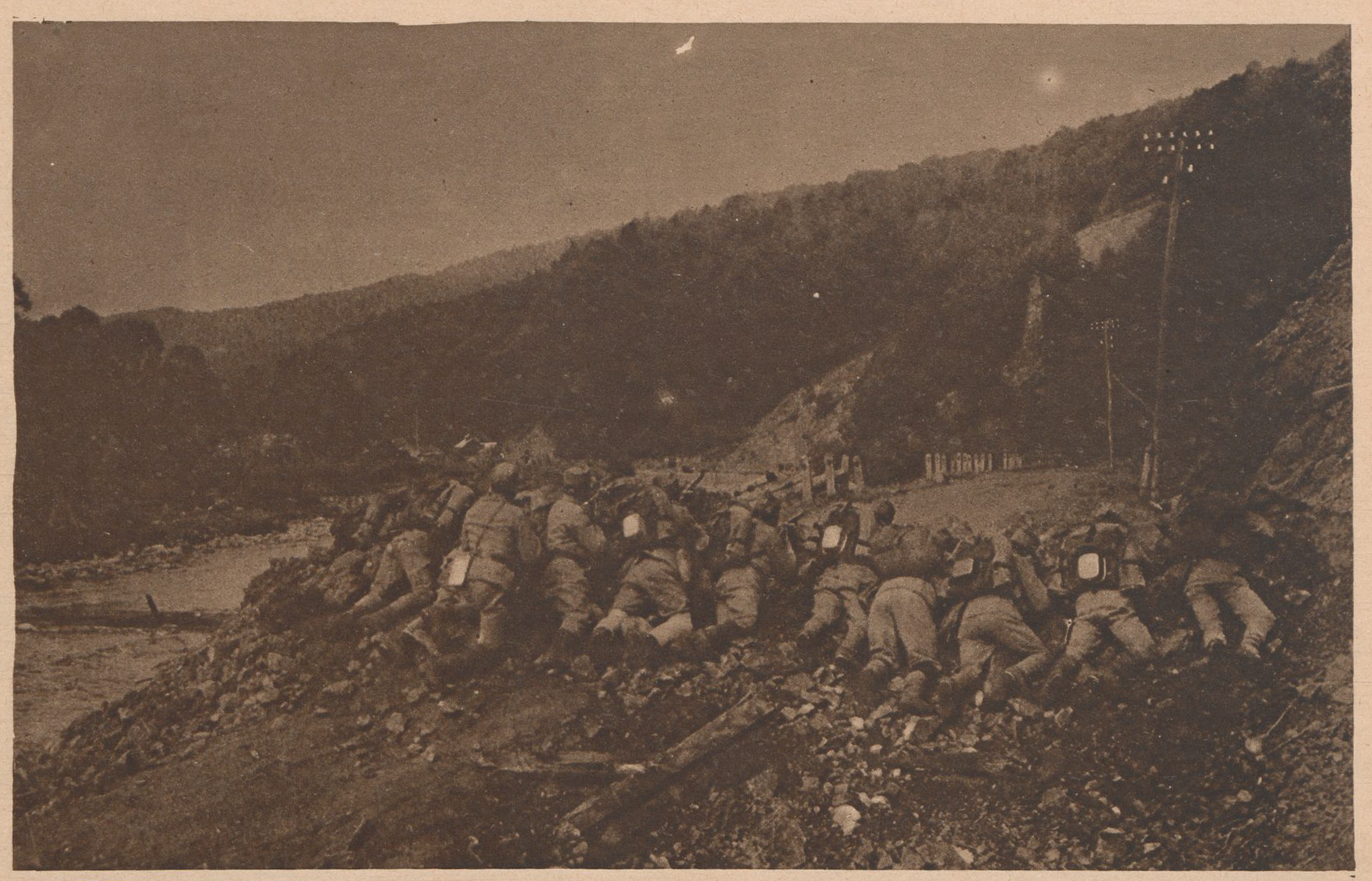
Romanian defense line on the Prahova Valley

The XXXIX Corps was stalled in the Predeal region, reporting that it could see no way in which the enemy position in the pass would fall soon. The Romanian defense in this section of the front was brilliant, and by the first days of November the Central Powers had not advanced more than 4 miles across the Romanian border. Thus, as an attempt to break through into the Wallachian Plain, the Central Powers operations in the Predeal sector had proved a failure. Semi-official German sources admitted that "the Rumanian defends his country with unsparing energy".

In order for Falkenhyan to win a complete victory at the earliest possible moment, it was necessary to force the passes in the center of the Carpathian arc. Namely, the Rucăr–Bran Pass and the Buzău Pass. If that had been achieved and the railway between Buzău and Ploiești seized, Romania would have been split in two, with Wallachia separated from Moldavia. The Romanian 1st Army and much of the 2nd Army would have been cut off. Thus, the Romanians ultimately averted the worst possible results.
