= Sânpetru =

- Commune
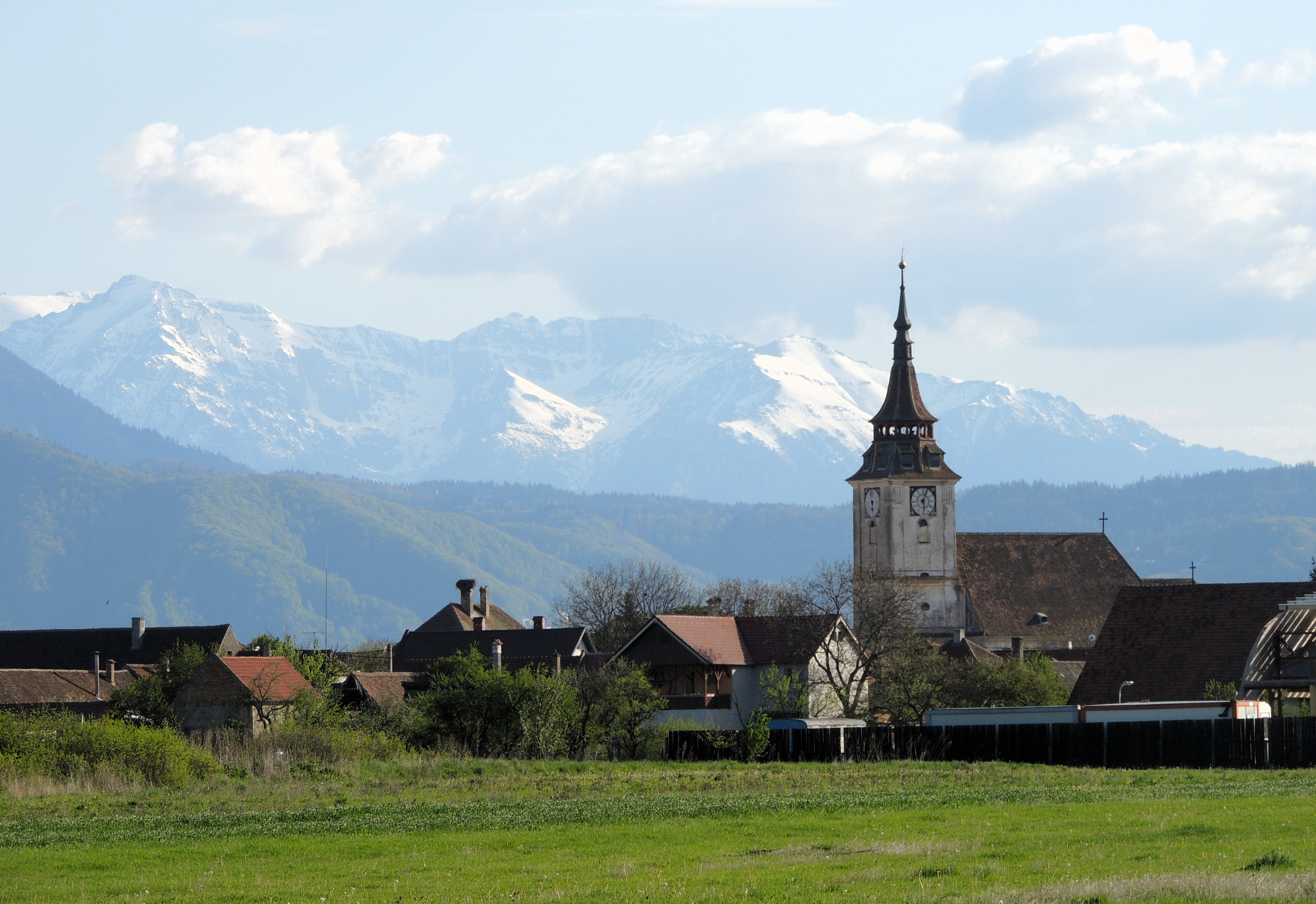
- Sânpetru, with the Carpathian Mountains in the background

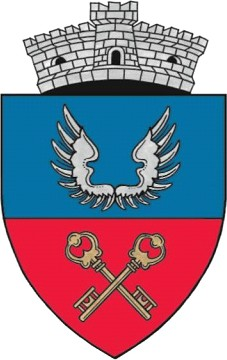
- Coat of arms

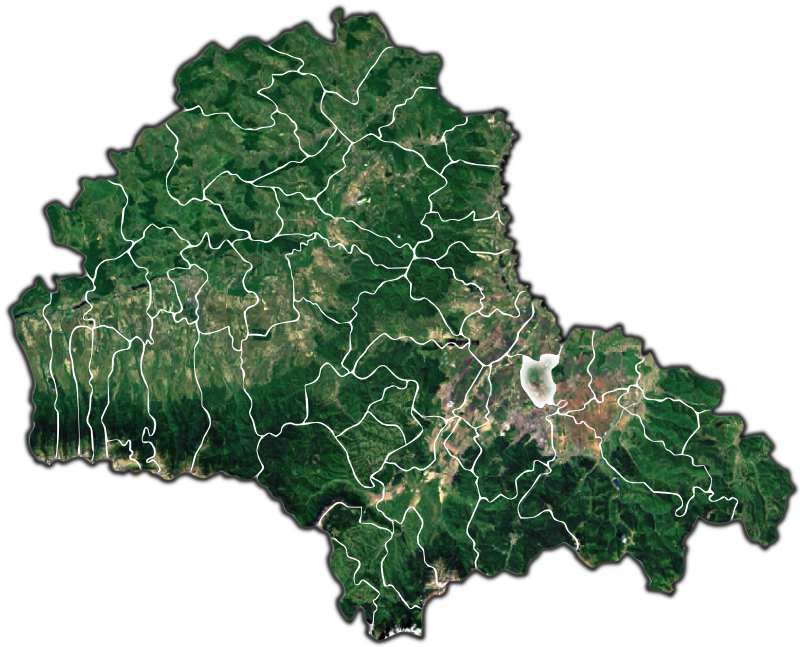
- Location within the county

- Location in Romania
- Coordinates: 45.7167°N 25.6333°E
- Country: Romania
- County: Brașov

Government
  - Mayor (2024–2028): Andrei-Darius Moldovan (USR)
- Area: 30.74 km^{2} (11.87 sq mi)
- Elevation: 530 m (1,740 ft)
- Population (2021-12-01): 11,794
  - Density: 383.7/km^{2} (993.7/sq mi)
- Time zone: UTC+02:00 (EET)
  - Summer (DST): UTC+03:00 (EEST)
- Postal code: 507190
- Area code: +(40) 268
- Vehicle reg.: BV
- Website: www.sanpetru.ro

Sânpetru (German: Petersberg; Hungarian: Barcaszentpéter) is a commune in Brașov County, Transylvania, Romania, located just north of the county seat, Brașov. It is composed of a single village, Sânpetru.

The commune is located in the Burzenland ethnographic area, in the eastern part of the county, at the foot of the Carpathian Mountains.

This area was home to many Transylvanian Saxons, although after the Romanian Revolution of 1989 much of this community emigrated to Germany. The center of the village was built by this group and shows the influence of German architecture. Separate from this there is a Romanian-built area featuring a small church and houses dating at least to the early 19th century. A new center was built closer to Brașov during the communist era to house migrating workers for the tractor and bus factories in the city. Since 1989, new, more luxurious houses have been built on the outskirts of the village, slowly linking it with Brașov.

== Demographics ==
Historical population
Year	Pop.	±%
2002	3,449	—
2011	4,819	+39.7%
2021	11,794	+144.7%
Source: Census data

At the 2011 census, the commune had 4,819 inhabitants, of which 91.8% of were Romanians, 2.7% Hungarians, and 1.7% each Germans and Roma. At the 2021 census, the population of Sânpetru grew to 11,794; of those, 79.85% were Romanians and 2.73% Hungarians.

Natives include Zaharia Bârsan (1878–1948), a playwright, poet, and actor and Reinhold Batschi (born 1942), a former Romanian rower and leading Australian rowing coach.

== Churches ==
The landmark of the village is the 13th-century fortified church. The original 3-nave basilica was demolished in 1794. There are still a few traces of the original 13th-century paintings on the defensive walls that surrounded the church. The Order of Cistercians received it in 1240. The fortified church was severely destroyed during a Turkish invasion in 1432. Most of the village was also destroyed then. After the Ottoman invasion, the local community built an 8-meter-high defensive wall fortified with 5 towers and a water trench.

In the 17th century, the church suffered major damage in a large fire that also destroyed the local archives. The bell tower collapsed in 1713 and was rebuilt in 1778–82. This tower later collapsed, and in 1795 the structure was demolished and construction on a new church was begun.

== Tourism ==
Sânpetru's main tourist attraction is the land around Lempeș Hill, a partially forested promontory which is a reservation for wild flora. This is a habitat for certain vary rare flowers as well as various fruit-bearing plants such as strawberry, raspberry, blackberry, and blueberry. This preserve is home to a variety of fauna including rabbits, snakes, lizards, and birds. Deer once made their home here but may have since been hunted to extinction. The ecology here is somewhat imperiled by the nearby presence of an artificial lake for depositing tar waste, herds of sheep. Paragliding enthusiasts use the hill as a launch point.

== Literature ==
- Arne Franke: Das wehrhafte Sachsenland – Kirchenburgen im südlichen Siebenbürgen, Deutsches Kulturforum Östliches Europa, Potsdam 2007 ISBN 978-3-936168-27-3 (online).
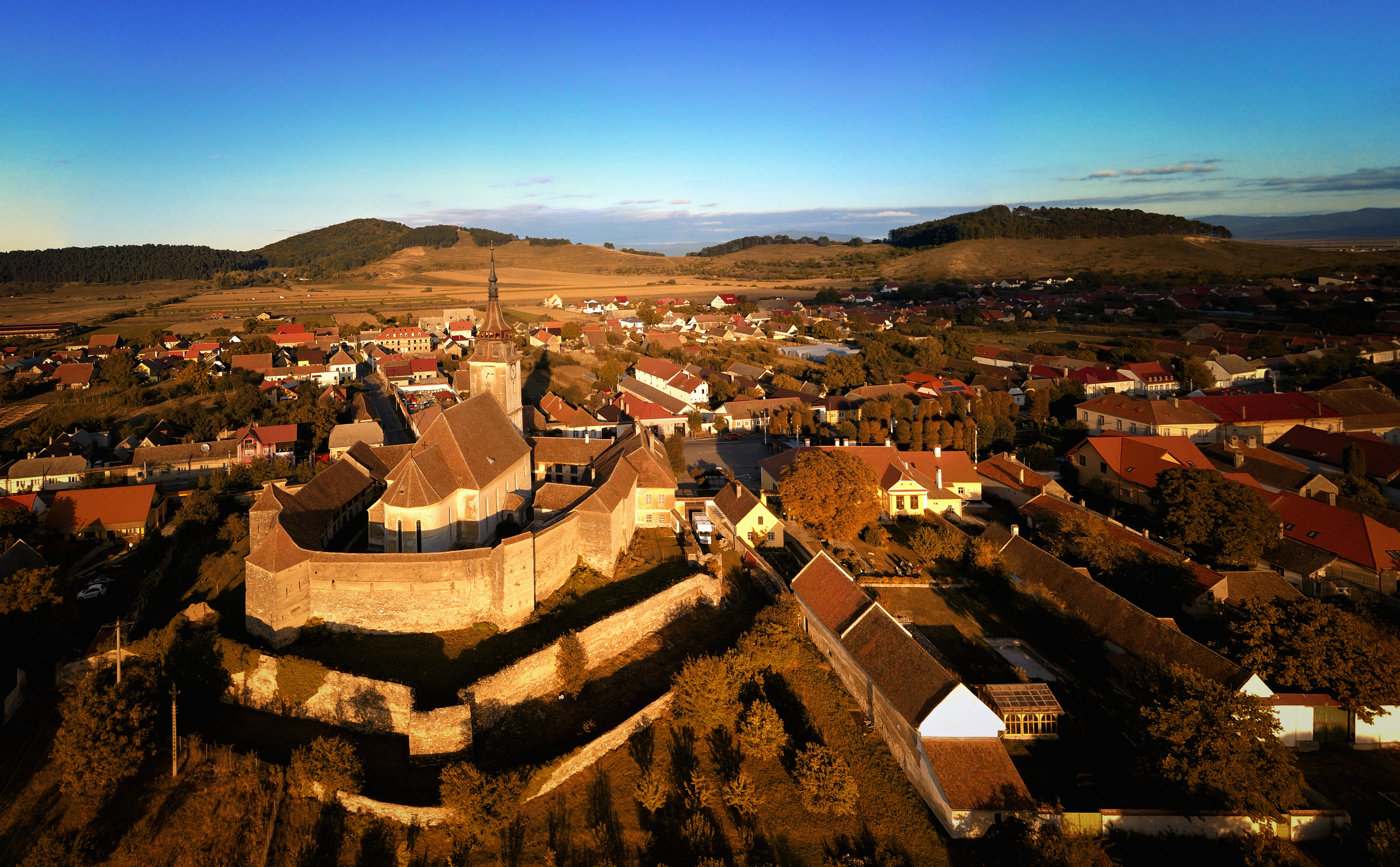
Aerial view

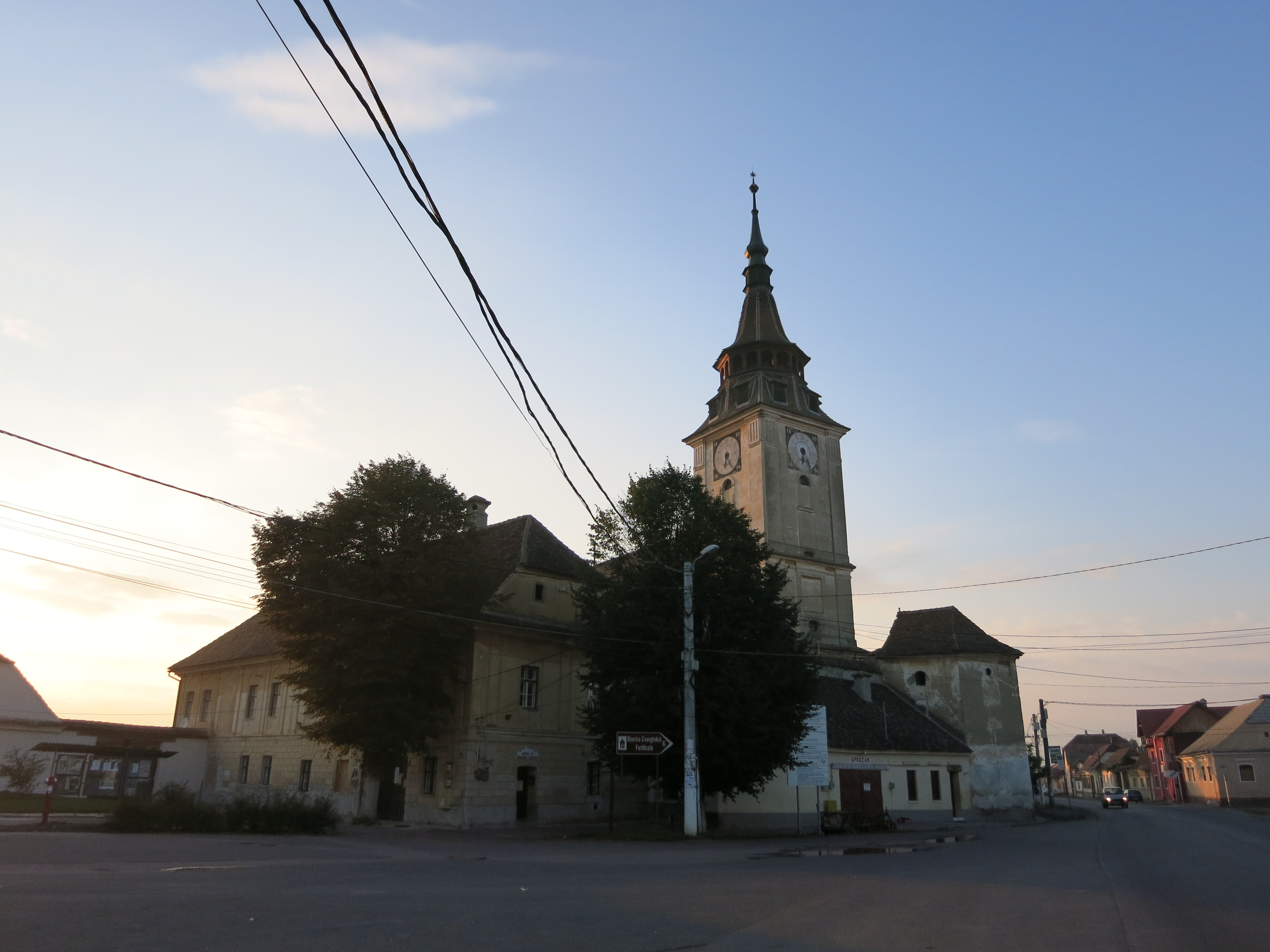
A Sânpetru landmark: The fortified German church, seen from the center

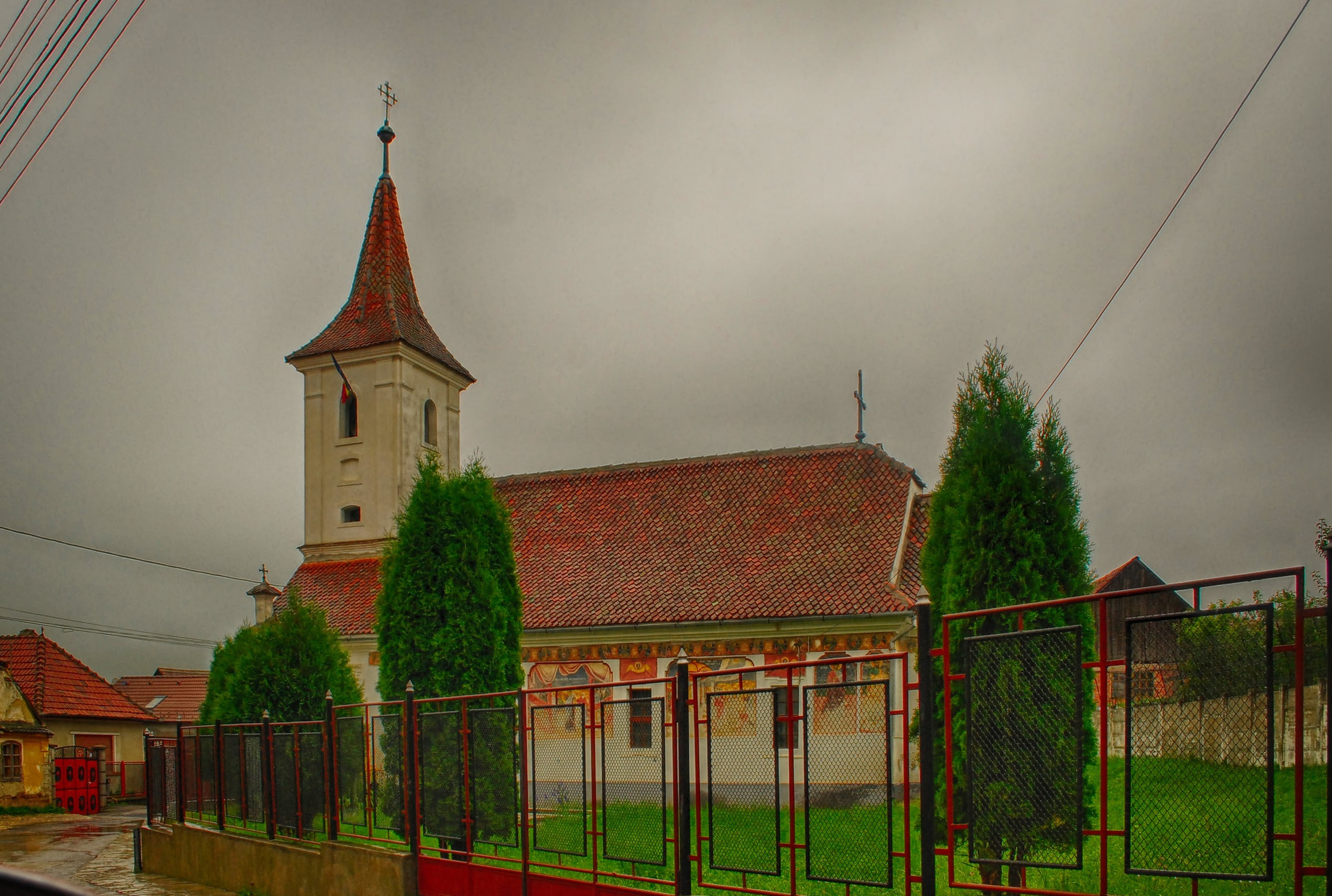
St. Nicholas Church

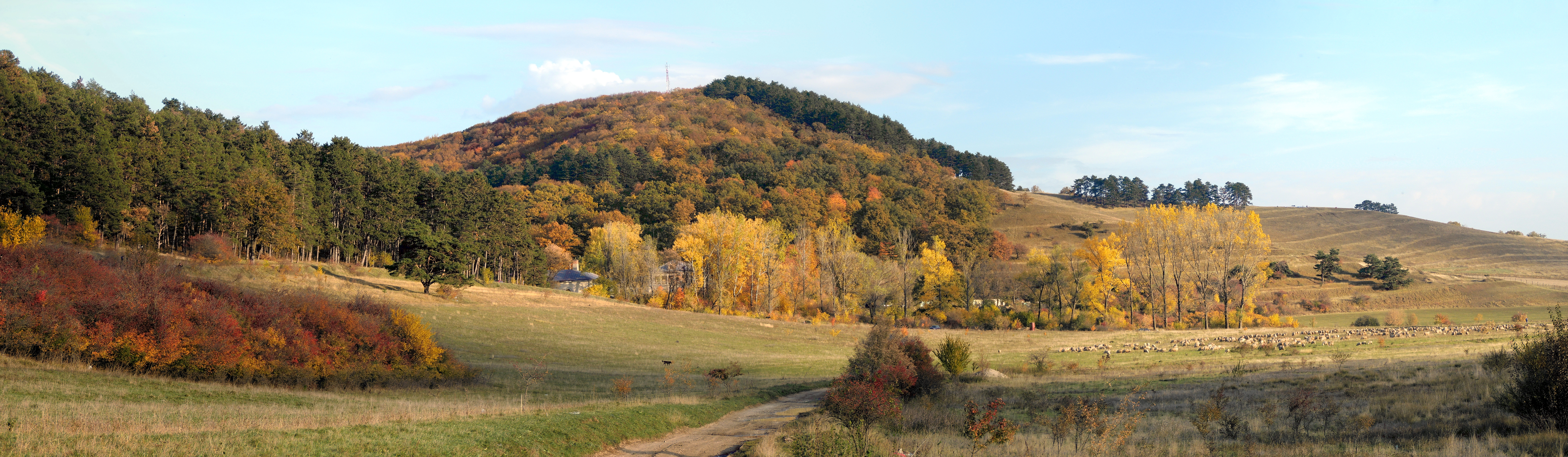
Lempeș Hill

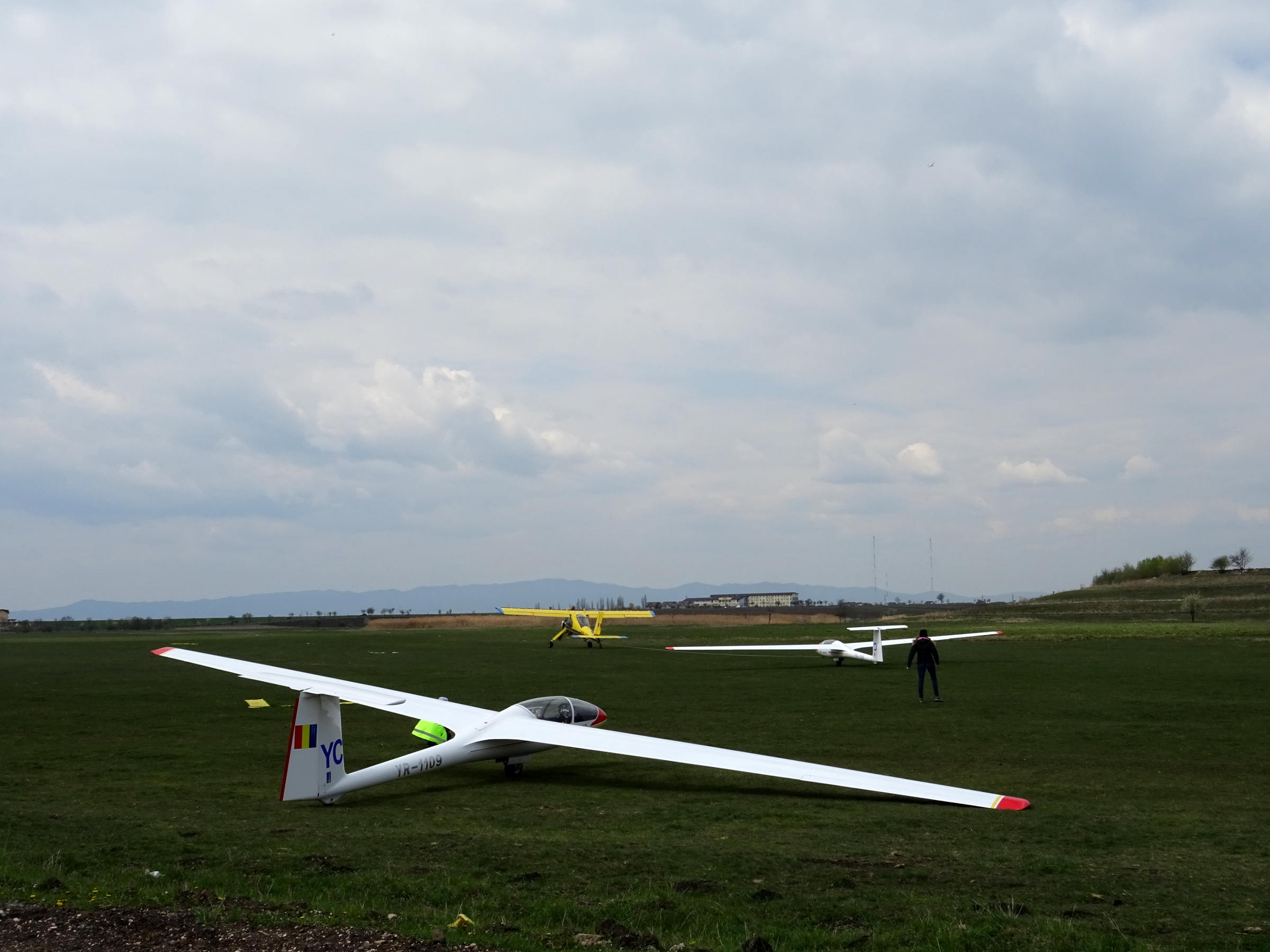
Sânpetru Airfield (LRSP)
