= Doug Pulman =

New Zealand rower (1946–2011)

Personal information
- Full name: Douglas William Pulman
- Born: 1 January 1946 Ngāruawāhia, New Zealand
- Died: 7 December 2011 (aged 65) Ngāhinapōuri, New Zealand
- Height: 1.66 m (5 ft 5 in)
- Weight: 75 kg (165 lb)

Sport
- Country: New Zealand
- Sport: Rowing
Medal record
Representing New Zealand
Men's rowing
British Empire and Commonwealth Games
Gold medal – first place	1962 Perth	Coxed four

Douglas William Pulman (1 January 1946 – 7 December 2011) was a New Zealand rowing coxswain.

Pulman was born in 1946 in Ngāruawāhia.

At the 1962 British Empire and Commonwealth Games, he won the gold medal as part of the men's coxed four alongside crew members Keith Heselwood, George Paterson, Hugh Smedley and Winston Stephens. Pulman competed at the 1964 Summer Olympics as part of the men's eight. He was New Zealand Olympian number 198.

Pulman died on 7 December 2011 at his home in Ngāhinapōuri.
