= Drummoyne Rowing Club =

Australian rowing club

- Location: Drummoyne, Sydney, Australia
- Home water: Iron Cove, Sydney Harbour
- Founded: 1 September 1919
- Affiliations: Rowing NSW
- Website: www.drummoynerowers.com.au

Drummoyne Rowing Club, formed in 1919 in Sydney, Australia is one of four rowing clubs on Iron Cove in Sydney Harbour. It has occupied its current site at Sister's Bay, Drummoyne since its foundation. The DRC is a community based competitive and recreational rowing club with a long history in welcoming women members. It offers programs at club and master's level and leases its facilities for some schools' programs.

== History ==
The Sydney Morning Herald reported on 7 March 1896 that a committee was appointed to form Drummoyne Rowing Club. Nothing progressed until 20 January 1919 when again a meeting was held on forming a club.

The minutes recorded: A meeting of a number of prominent rowing men of the district was held on Monday last for the purpose of forming a rowing club at Drummoyne. It was decided to petition the Mayor with a view to his calling a public meeting in the local Town Hall on 3 February, when a scheme drawn up by the meeting will be discussed. The sum of £50 has already been given. The following officers were elected :- Hon. Secretary, Mr. F. Cronin; Assistant Hon. Secretary, Mr. N. Barrell; Honorary Treasurer Mr. J. Huston.

Mr. Fred Cronin, one of the hon. secretaries of the proposed new rowing club at Drummoyne, advised that the public meeting which was to have been held at the Drummoyne Town Hall on Monday 14 July had been postponed for about a month. It was not thought advisable to hold it on the original date owing to the influenza epidemic in Sydney.

Later, A.C Ingham, a Drummoyne Alderman and Quarton Deloitte Sydney Rowing Club President and Mr W.A Hence of the NSW Rowing Association presided over a public meeting at the Drummoyne Town Hall on 28 August 1919 which was called for the purpose of forming a rowing club at Drummoyne. The Enterprise Rowing Club on the other side of the Iron Cove at Balmain had been destroyed by a fierce gale on 19 September 1917. A number of Enterprise Club members were Drummoyne residents and there was an interest in rebuilding across the river. Fred Cronin, Wally Kolts, Bill Witt Senior and Junior, George McKenzie, Lance Wearne & Norm Barrell were the Enterprise members instrumental in the DRC's foundation. The first committee was elected on 1 September 1919 with Ingham as President and Cronin as Secretary. The club chose to welcome women members from its inception.

By 29 November 1919, three concrete piers, forming part of the foundation of the boat house, were placed in position in Sister's Bay on the Iron Cove. The building took two years to complete, work being done on Saturday afternoons and holidays only. The new boathouse was officially opened by Sir Walter Davidson on 24 September 1921. Mr A.C. Ingham owned a timber yard and supplied materials at cost as well as standing as guarantor for the club to its bank lender. The club's first boat purchase around that same time was a four-oared boat from George Towns & Sons. Much of the building work was done by volunteers and the clubhouse was finally completed in September 1921 and opened by the Governor Sir Walter Davidson.

The club won the Junior Pennant in its first two years of existence and was runner-up in both pennants in its third year, all this notwithstanding the fact that the fleet consisted only of one racing eight and one regulation four. In March 1923, the NSW State Eight crew prepared for the Interstate Rowing Championships at the new boatshed.

In 1966 a liquor license was obtained by which stage membership numbers had grown to 205 and a new licensed clubhouse was opened in 1968 with dining room extensions completed by 1975. A new boathouse was rebuilt in the mid 1980s. The licensed club ran into financial difficulties in the new millennium and ceased operation from 2010, although rowing continued.

The rowing club and its members continue to compete in club, state and national regattas.

== Regattas ==
The Drummoyne Regatta course on Iron Cove is a 1000m sprint course that starts off Leichhardt Park near the Leichhardt Rowing Club and finishes in Sister's Bay off the DRC boatshed. As of 2018 Drummoyne host a Rowers Regatta (consisting of around 40 events) in March of the Rowing NSW season and a Masters Regatta a month later consisting of around 50 masters events. Along with the Glebe Rowing Club and the three other Iron Cove rowing clubs Drummoyne host one of the four week JB Sharp winter regattas over a short form 900m course.

== Club presidents ==
- A.C Ingham (1919)
- Graham Wearne (1980s)
- Kathleen Hextell (2014 - )

== Club Captains ==
- George Andrews (1995 - 2016)
- Robert Glendenning (2016 -)

== Members ==
Notable past members include:

- Clyde Hefer two-time world champion in the lightweight coxless four and a 1984 Olympian.
- Graham Gardiner was a Drummoyne rower when he won the first of this two world championships in the lightweight coxless four.
- Graham Wearne was a national champion and represented at the 1979 World Championships. He commenced his senior club career in 1971 and in 2014 aged 70 was still competing in masters events.
- Peter Stroud was a national champion in 1980.
- Club coach Rusty Robertson was Australia's national rowing coach from 1979 to 1984 having earlier been the NZ national coach from 1967 to 1976.
- Brian Denny was the club's 1st Olympic selection, picked to stroke the Australian coxed four for Munich 1972. He was electrocuted and died weeks before leaving for the Olympics.
