= Glebe Rowing Club =

Australian rowing club

- Location: Glebe, Sydney
- Home water: Blackwattle Bay, Sydney Harbour
- Founded: July 1879
- Affiliations: NSW Rowing Association
- Website: www.gleberowingclub.org.au

Glebe Rowing Club is the third-oldest rowing club in continuous operation on Sydney Harbour and was established in July 1879 in Blackwattle Bay Sydney, Australia. It has occupied its current location at the foot of Ferry St, Glebe since the club's inception. GRC is a community based club with a focus on novice, women's and social rowing and with a learn-to-row program.

== History ==
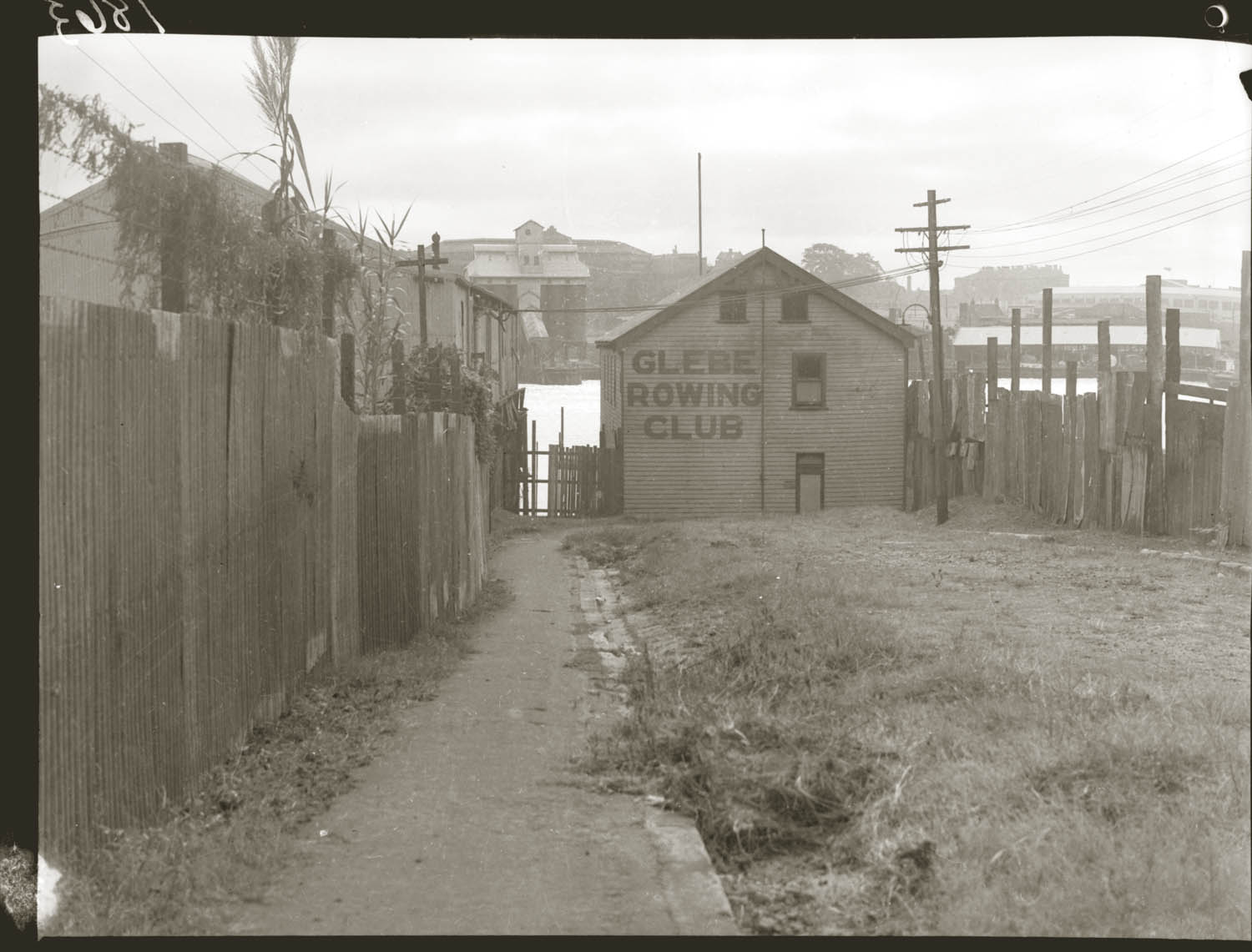
The Glebe Rowing Club's clubhouse, ca 1935

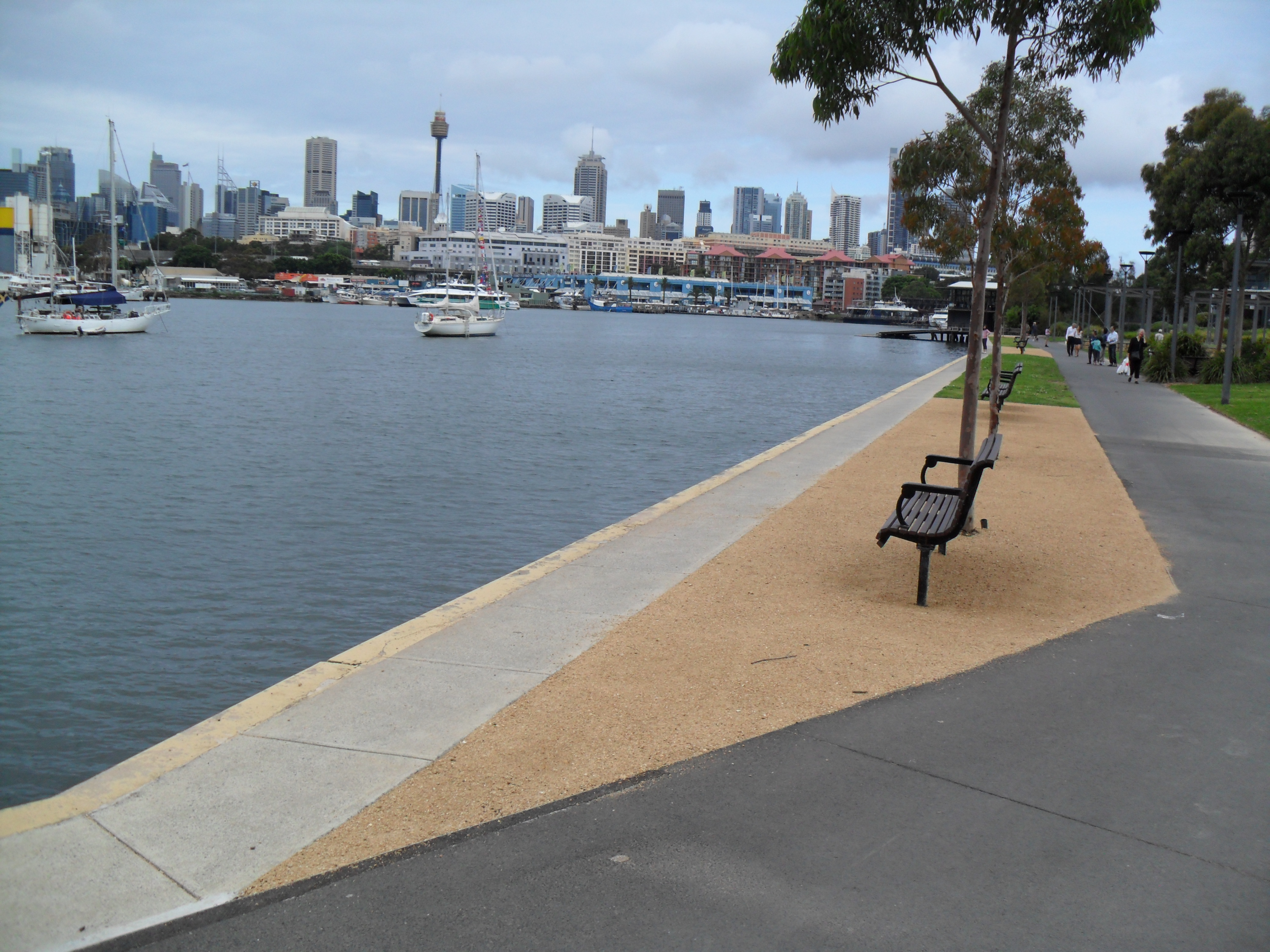
GRC's original boatshed is the 1st building along the right shoreline with the current shed immediately beyond

The Glebe Club was founded with an open attitude in welcoming labourers as members unlike the other Sydney rowing clubs formed at that time – the Sydney Rowing Club and Mercantile. Glebe's first president was Sir George Wigram Allen, Speaker of the NSW Legislative Assembly and Glebe's first Mayor. Its first captain was Robert Clark, brother of Jim Clark, the Sydney's captain at that time. During the first ten years of the club's history it was the third most successful in Sydney winning 24 of the 260 races rowed between 1880 and 1890. In 1897 the shed at Blackwattle Bay and all the club's boats were destroyed by fire. A£570 insurance claim was made, a new shed opened only months later and a new fleet ordered. The club finished the last decade of the 19th century with 92 members and 11 boats.

At the end of the 1901/02 season, the club had 77 members and a fleet of 16 boats and had enjoyed some competitive success under club captain John McGregor. However, the club's decision to pay part of the capitation fees for its members of the New South Wales 1902 interstate crew caused considerable internal dissension, with a special meeting censuring the committee and several committee members then resigning.

Glebe competed against the Iron Cove clubs for the Leichhardt Challenge Shield during the 1910s, claiming victory from the Leichhardt Rowing Club in 1918. That decade also saw the commencement of combined rowing and social outings. Glebe and the Mosman Rowing Club started the trend in 1915, with Enterprise and Balmain quickly following the example. Glebe held another event in 1916 the same year that Leichhardt, Balmain and the Enterprise club held a combined Rodd Island rendezvous.

In May 1953 for the second time in its history the club house was completely destroyed by fire and all boats were again lost. The club entered a hiatus until rebuilding commenced in 1957.

Due to financial difficulties in the mid-1990s the GRC lost rights to its original shed. The upper floor was taken over by a restaurant and the shed by the Sydney University Women's Rowing Club. Olympian Kim Mackney was club's sole member from 1994 to 2004 and struggled to keep the club alive in that time. Eventually a new shed facility was secured immediately next to the Ferry Road boathouse.

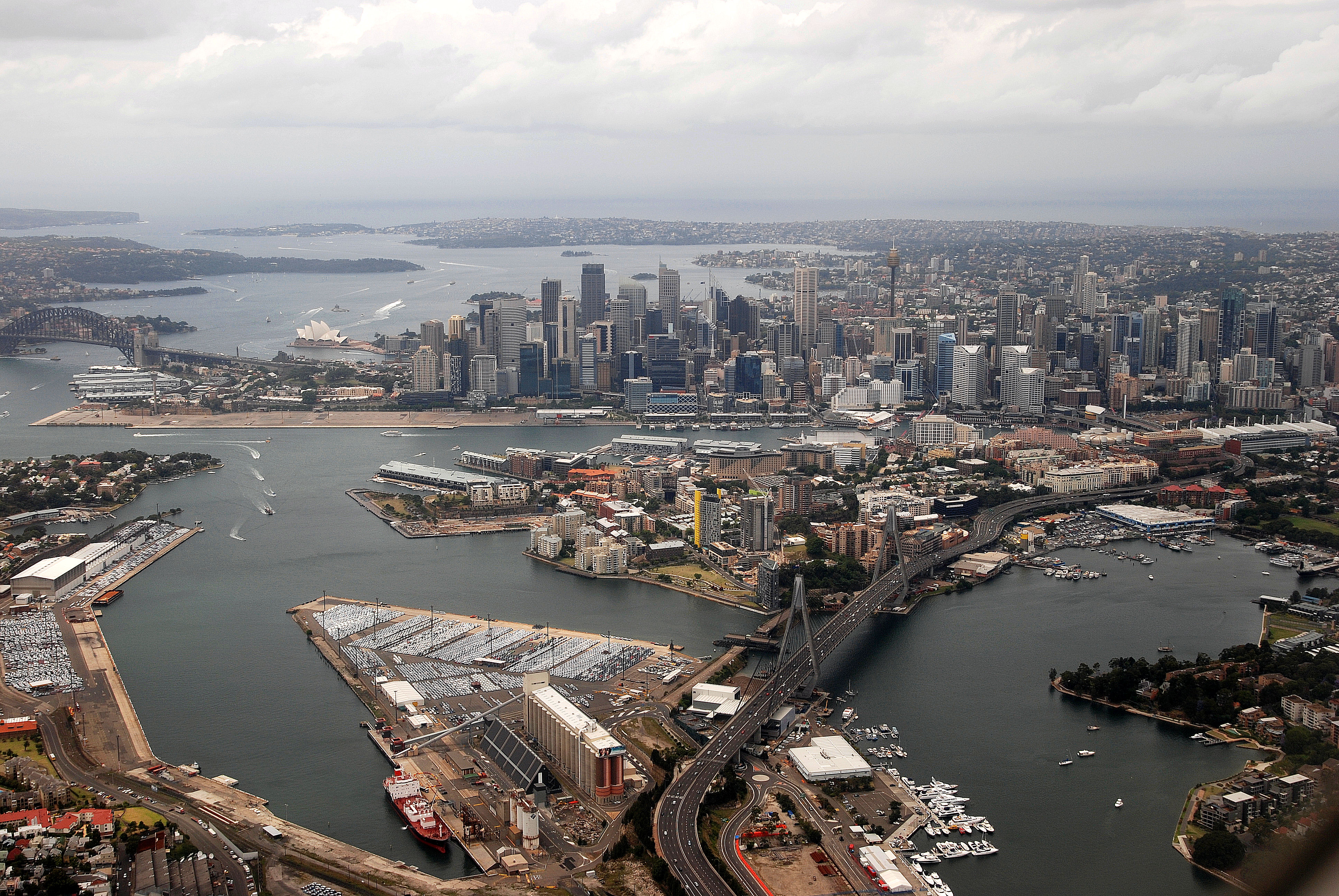
Blackwattle Bay (right) in its Sydney Harbour context (GRC's original shed is at right edge of shot)

== Club presidents ==
- Sir George Wigram Allen, first Mayor of Glebe, Speaker of the NSW Legislative Assembly and the club's inaugural President.
- Kim Mackney, President (1994–2016) was the club's sole member from 1994 to 2004 and presided over the club's re-establishment from 2004 and its return to viability.

== Members ==
Notable members include:

- Laurie Stepto OAM club member 1947 to 1986; senior office bearer with Rowing NSW 1955 to 1986 incl President 1978–86 and a former manager of an Australian touring rowing squad.

Olympic representative members include:

- Kim Mackney rowed in the coxless pair at Munich 1972. He was a Sydney Rowing Club member when he gained Olympic selection but was a Glebe member afterward and dedicated a life of service to the club.
- Islay Lee was a Sydney Rowing Club member when he became a dual Olympian but earlier won two national championship titles in Glebe colours in 1970 and 1972.

World champions include:

- George Cook, world professional sculling champion 1949.
- Graham Gardiner, world champion 1980 in a lightweight coxless four.
