= Balmain Rowing Club =

- Location: Balmain, Sydney, Australia
- Home water: Iron Cove, Sydney Harbour
- Founded: 7 June 1882
- Affiliations: NSW Rowing Association
- Website: www.balmainrowingclub.com.au

Balmain Rowing Club is the fourth oldest rowing club in continuous operation on Sydney Harbour, Australia, and was established in July 1882 at Balmain, Sydney. It has occupied its current site at the bottom of White St, Balmain since the club's inception. BRC is a community based club with a primary focus of introducing juniors to the joys of rowing with a learn-to-row program for novice scullers as well as providing facilities for masters and social rowing.

== History ==
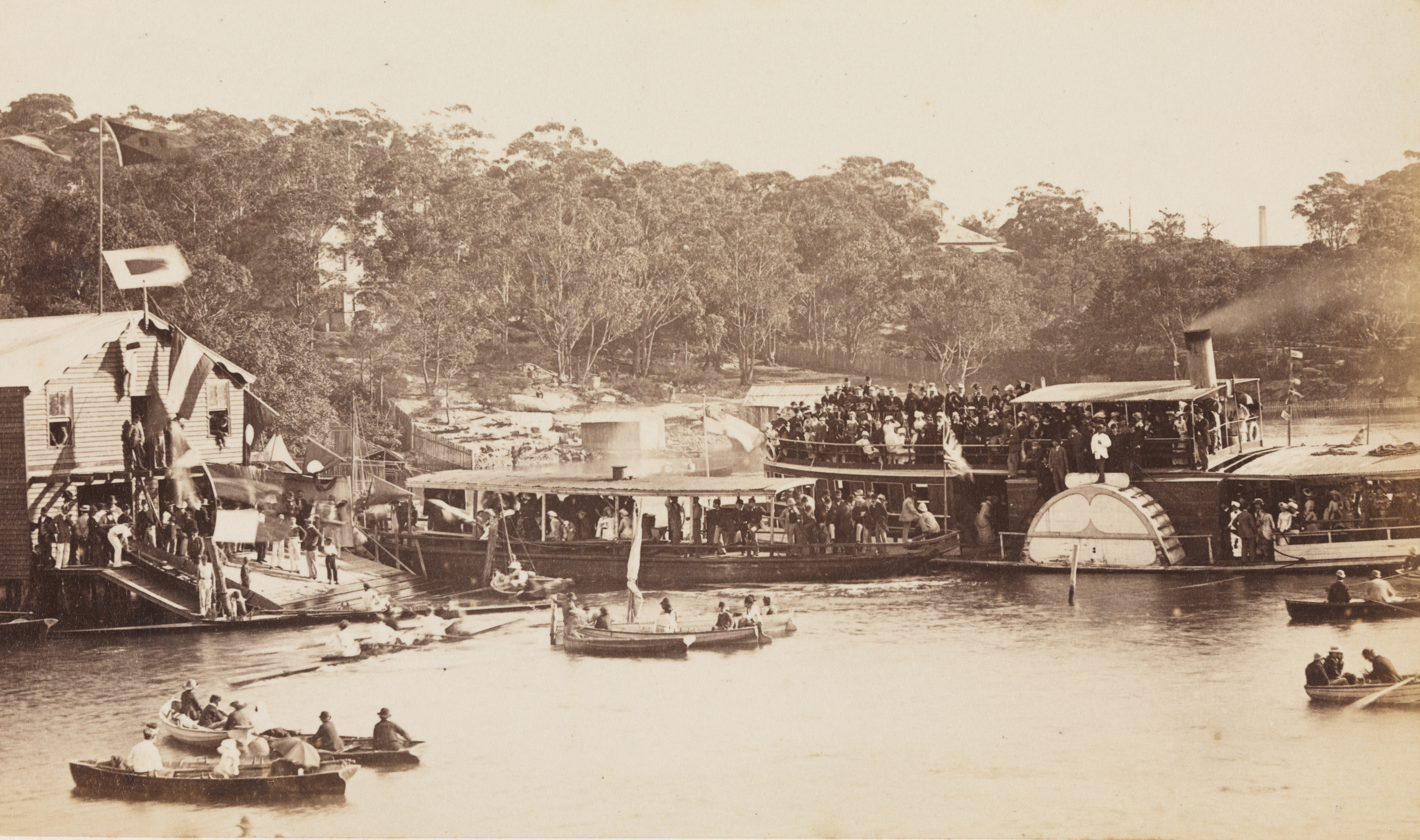
Balmain Rowing Sheds, Sydney, c. 1885

Balmain Rowing Club was formed on 7 June 1882 at a meeting held at Dicks Hotel in Balmain. The meeting consisted of local citizens and the mayor and councillors of the then Balmain Municipal Council. That same year the site of Pritchard's Boatshed at the bottom of White Street was purchased and plans made to build the rowing shed at a cost of £368. The club is on the same site today.

== Competition history ==
In the 1910/11 and the 1911/12 seasons Balmain won the New South Wales Rowing Association's premiership pennant and was runner up in the following two seasons. When the premiership recommenced in 1919/20 after World War I, Balmain was again successful. A second place was also achieved in 1921/22 but the club suffered a lull in the next four seasons failing to score a point (win a race) in the either the senior or junior pennant from 1923 to 1927. Success wouldn't be achieved again until the last two years of the 1930s when 2nd places were again attained.

== Members ==
Olympic and Paralympic representative members include:

- Cecil Pearce rowed in the single scull at Berlin 1936.
- Gary Pearce competed at Tokyo 1964, Mexico City 1968 and at Munich 1972 winning a silver medal in Mexico City in the VIII. He had joined Sydney Rowing Club by 1968 but was a Balmain member when he first represented in a double scull.
- Jeremy McGrath rowed as a member of the Australian LTA Mixed Coxed Four that finished first in the LTAMix4+ B Final at the Rio Paralympics.

World champions include:

- Three-time world champion sculler William Beach rowed in Balmain colours after being given a black-and-gold singlet when he stopped by the club to empty his scull on his way to an 1885 world title race on the Parramatta River. He maintained a life-long association with the club.
