= Reinhold Batschi =

Romanian/Australian rower and coach

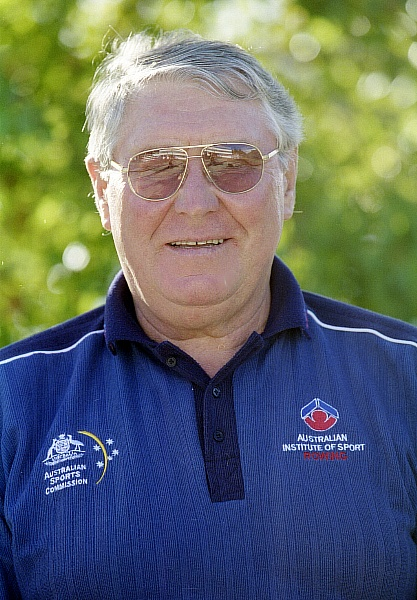
- Batschi in 2003

Personal information
- Born: 20 August 1942 (age 83) Sânpetru, Brașov County, Romania

Sport
- Sport: Rowing
Medal record
Men's rowing
Representing Romania
European Rowing Championships
Bronze medal – third place	1967 Vichy	Coxless four

Reinhold Batschi OAM (born 20 August 1942 in Sânpetru, Brașov County, Romania) is a former Romanian rower and leading Australian rowing coach. He was the inaugural Head Coach of the Australian Institute of Sport's rowing program and Head Coach of the Australian Olympic rowing teams from 1980 to 2000.

== Rowing career ==
Batschi became involved in rowing as a result of Romania's compulsory national service. Representing Romania as a rower, Batschi won a bronze medal in the men's coxed fours at the 1967 European Rowing Championships. At the 1968 Mexico Olympics, his crew the men's coxed four finished seventh. He retired from competitive rowing in 1969.

== Coaching career ==
Batschi completed a sports studies degree at the National Academy of Physical Education and Sport in Bucharest, Romania. In 1970, he became at coach at his rowing club in Bucharest. Batschi them moved to West Germany to become Head Coach at the City of West Berlin Rowing Centre. He coached the West German team to medals at the 1976 Montreal Olympics.

In 1979, he moved to Australia with his wife Florie and two daughters to take up the appointment of National Coaching Director for the Australian Rowing Council (Rowing Australia). In 1984, he was appointed inaugural Head Coach of the Australian Institute of Sport's rowing program. He held this position until his retirement in September 2007.

In 1986, Batschi coached the Australian men's eight which won the gold medal at the 1986 World Rowing Championships. This was the first and only time Australia won the men's eight at either the Olympic Games or at a World Championship.

Upon retirement in 2007 he was acknowledged for "his pioneering work included a national program for technique development, a coach development program that was the forerunner of a national coach accreditation scheme, a program of international competition for up-and-coming rowers, improved selection procedures, and year-round training".

== International representative coaching medal record ==
=== Olympic Games ===
Head Coach of the Australian Olympic rowing teams from 1980 to 2000. During his period as Head Coach, Australia won 16 Olympic rowing medals (four gold, five silver and seven bronze). He only directly coached teams in 1984 and 1988 Games.

- 1984 – Bronze medal – Men's eight
- 1988 – Fifth – Men's eight
- 2004 - Seventh - Men's Quadruple Scull

=== World Championships ===
Head Coach in 1991 and 1999 World Championships. Results for crews coached at World Championships:

- 1983 Bronze medal – Men's eight
- 1986 Gold medal – Men's eight
- 1987 Fourth – Men's eight
- 1989 Tenth – Men's four
- 1990 Eight – Men's eight
- 1991 Tenth – Men's eight
- 1994 Fifth – Men's coxed four
- 1995 Eleventh – Men's eight
- 1997 Eighth – Men's coxless pair
- 2001 Tenth – Men's quad scull
- 2002 Fourth – Men's double scull; Fourteenth – Men's single scull
- 2003 Fourth – Men's quad scull

=== Commonwealth Games ===
- 1986 – Gold medal – Men's eight; Bronze medal – Men's Coxed Fours

== Accolades ==
- 1987 – OAM for his services to rowing, particularly through coaching.
- 1990 – inducted in the Sport Australia Hall of Fame as a general member
- 1991 – Eunice Gill Coach Education Merit Award.
- 2000 – Australian Sports Medal
- 2015 – Rowing Australia renamed its National Training Centre in Canberra – The Reinhold Batschi National Training Centre
- 2016 – Distinguished Services to International Rowing Award.
- Life Member Rowing Australia
