= 1978 FISA Lightweight Championships =

International rowing event

- Venue: Lake Bagsværd
- Location: Copenhagen, Denmark
- Dates: 3–6 August 1978

The 1978 FISA Lightweight Championships were held in Copenhagen, Denmark from 3 to 6 August 1978. In the history of the World Rowing Championships, 1978 was the only year when the lightweight rowing championships were not held in conjunction with the open men and women event. (Other years in which championships were held separately for lightweights were Olympic years, in which there were no openweight World Championships.) The lightweight finals were raced on 6 August. The event was held at Lake Bagsværd. In 1978, a fourth boat class was added to the event: Lightweight double scull.

Later in 1978, the open event went to the Southern Hemisphere for the first time and was held at Lake Karapiro near Cambridge, New Zealand.

== Medal summary ==
Event:	Gold:	Time	Silver:	Time	Bronze:	Time
LM1x	Spain; José Antonio Montosa Ortega	7:19.54	Denmark; Morten Espersen	7:23.21	United States; William Belden	7:25.80
LM2x	Norway; Pål Børnick (b); Arne Gilje (s)	6:47.49	Netherlands; Roel Michels (b); Ed Maan (s)	6:48.83	United States; Stan Depman (b); Fred Duling (s)	6:50.09
LM4-	Switzerland; Michael Raduner (b); Thomas von Weissenfluh (2); Pierre Zentner (3); Pierre Kovacs (s)	6:33.90	Netherlands; Peter van Berkel (b); Willem Appeldoorn (2); Richard Helsloot (3); Paul Paulsen (s)	6:34.24	Australia; Vaughan Bollen (b); Peter Antonie (2); Simon Gillett (3); Geoffrey Rees (s)	6:38.50
LM8+	Great Britain; Stephen Simpole (b); Nigel Read (2); Christopher Drury (3); Robert Downie (4); Clive Roberts (5); Peter Zeun (6); John Melvin (7); Anthony French (s); Colin Moynihan (cox)	5:56.32	Netherlands; Henk van der Kwast (b); Hans Lycklama (2); Hans Povel (3); Bert van Baal (4); Rob Uilenbroek (5); Mark Emke (6); Ton Lucassen (7); Dick Swenne (s); J. V. Prooyen (cox)	5:58.76	Australia; Dennis Hatcher (b); Malcolm Robertson (2); Phillip Gardiner (3); Bob Cooper (4); Lyall McCarthy (5); Ian Porter (6); Jeff Sykes (7); Colin Smith (s); Adrian Maginn (cox)	5:58.89

== Finals ==
Event	1st	2nd	3rd	4th	5th	6th
LM1x	Spain	Denmark	United States	Austria	Switzerland	Norway
LM2x	Norway	Netherlands	United States	France	Switzerland	Italy
LM4-	Switzerland	Netherlands	Australia	Denmark	Great Britain	Spain
LM8+	Great Britain	Netherlands	Australia	Spain	Denmark	West Germany

== Great Britain ==
Three teams from Great Britain competed at the championships.

Event		Notes
LM1x	N/A	no entry
LM2x	Daniel Topolski & Ian Wilson	7th overall (won the B final)
L4-	Andrew Cusack, Colin Cusack, Roy Wikramaratna, Tony Richardson (Wallingford RC)	5th in A final
L8	Stephen Simpole, Nigel Read, Christopher Drury, Robert Downie, Clive Roberts; Peter Zeun, John Melvin, Anthony French, Colin Moynihan (cox) (London RC)	gold medal in A final
