= West London College =

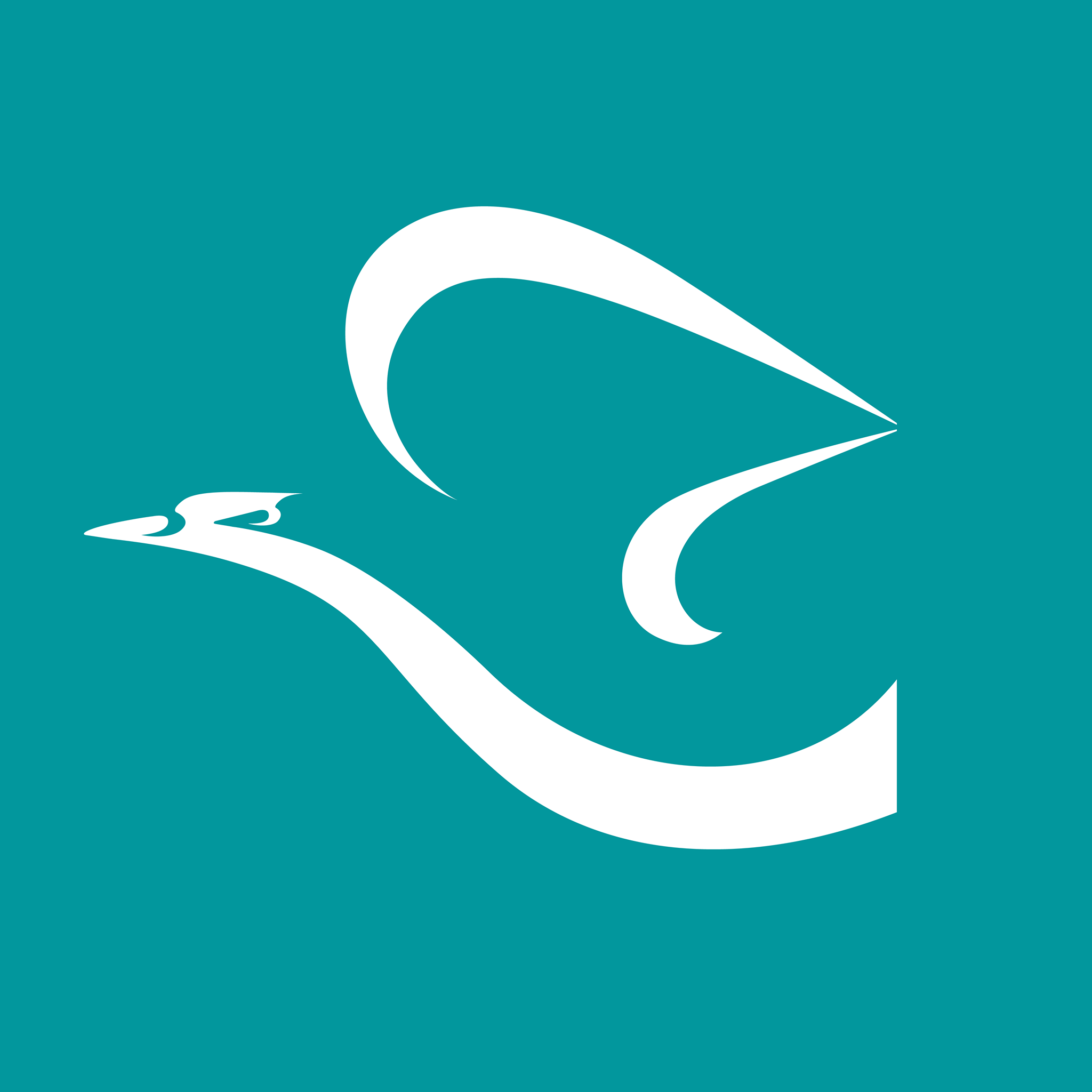

Location
- Gliddon Road; Hammersmith, London, W14 9BL; England; 51.4915°N 0.2145°W

Information
- Type: Further and Higher Education College
- Established: 1881-2002 – founding institutions 2002 – Ealing, Hammersmith and West London College
- Department for Education URN: 130408 Tables
- Ofsted: Reports
- CEO & Principal: Karen Redhead OBE
- Gender: Mixed
- Age: 14+
- Enrollment: 13,000+ (2016)
- Website: http://www.wlc.ac.uk/

West London College, legally known as the Ealing, Hammersmith and West London College is a large further and higher education college in West London, England, formed in 2002 by the merger between Ealing Tertiary College and Hammersmith and West London College. It is based across three campuses located in Ealing, Hammersmith and Southall; the main campus of the college is situated on the north side of the busy A4 dual-carriageway, between Hammersmith and Earls Court. There are over 13,000 students as of 2016, providing training and development from entry level to postgraduate.

== History ==
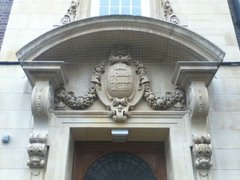
The College Front Ealing, Hammersmith & West London College.

In 1881, Hammersmith School of Art was established in Brook Green. There was also the Hammersmith College of Art and Building located in Lime Grove, Shepherds Bush. This college ran an Architecture course accredited by the RIBA and an Interior Design course. There were also facilities and studios in which were taught textile design, ceramics, sculpture and print-making. The 'building' side of the college included workshops in which the traditional building trades were taught, including plumbing, welding, plastering and brick-laying. The 'cross-discipline' opportunities that the close proximity that these departments afforded students was deliberate. That the sculpture students could learn from the welding classes (both instructors and apprentices) and the interior design students from the textile design students and the architecture students from the building trades apprentices was a recognized benefit of the graduates of the Hammersmith College of Art and Building. In 1970 the Architecture department of Hammersmith College of Art and Building merged with Woolwich Polytechnic to form Thames Polytechnic, which in 1993 became the University of Greenwich. The architectural teaching staff included Arthur Korn. In 1975 Hammersmith College of Art merged with West London College and forming Hammersmith and West London College.

Ealing Grammar School for Boys was opened in 1913 as Ealing County School and expanded in 1936, also known as Ealing County Grammar School. It had the Ealonian Hall. In 1939 the school was evacuated to Aylesbury Grammar School until July 1942

The Ealing boys' school headteacher was Mr William James Dudman, born 1888, who was later killed when at home on Thursday September 26 1940, on Inglis Road, with wife Nora Annie (nee Curtis), born in 1891, in a German air raid; he had been the headteacher from 1930.

Three of the headteacher's four sons were all later killed in action during the war; the eldest, Pilot Officer James, was in 625 Squadron in Avro Lancaster ND742 aged 26, on June 11 1944 over Bois-d'Arcy, Yvelines, flying from RAF Kelstern in Lincolnshire; the next-eldest son, Lt Peter, was in Monte Cassino on November 11 1943 with the Bucks LA; and 2nd Lt Richard Anthony (January 4 1920 - February 11 1942) was killed at El Alamein, with the Buckinghamshire Light Infantry, aged 22. The headteacher's remaining son George lived until 1985.

Ealing County Girls' School was evacuated to Wycombe High School. In 1974, Ealing borough adopted the comprehensive education system and the school became Ealing Green High School, a boys' school. Another institute Thomas Huxley College existed until 1980. In 1992, the school turned into Ealing Tertiary College.

The Southall Technical College was founded in 1929 as a technical school for boys, merging with Southall Grammar School in 1963 (now Villiers High School). The college's skills provision moved to the Norwood Hall Institute of Horticultural Education, and this became part of Ealing Tertiary College.

Acton Technical College is another former institution that is a predecessor of the current college.

In January 2002, Hammersmith and West London College merged with Ealing Tertiary College to form Ealing, Hammersmith and West London College. At the time it was the largest further education college in London with over 30,000 enrollments. It changed its public brand name to West London College from 2018.

== Campuses ==
=== Hammersmith and Fulham College ===
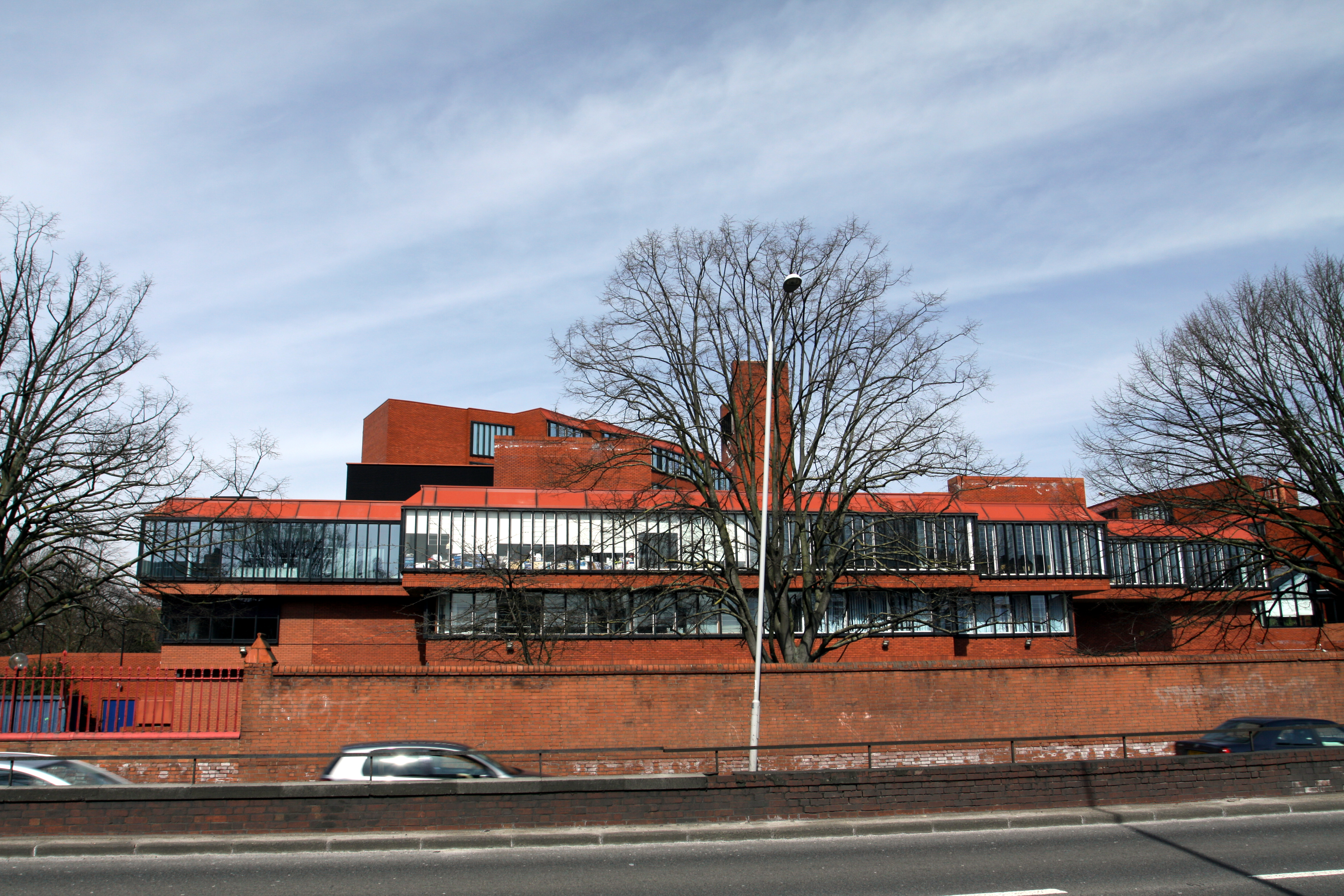
View to Hammersmith campus in spring 2013

Hammersmith is the largest campus, with over 10,000 students. The college offers a large number of full-time and part-time courses across a broad range of subjects for students of different ages, abilities and needs.

In the 1970s, the college was built on 14 acres (5.7 ha) former playing fields of St Paul's School, despite campaigns opposing the development. The college was designed by the Greater London Council Architects' Department, under the supervision of Bob Giles, the project architect, in a Brutalist style inspired by Alvar Aalto's Säynätsalo Town Hall.

Completed in 1980, the college replaced 11 separate sites across West London.

=== Ealing Green College ===
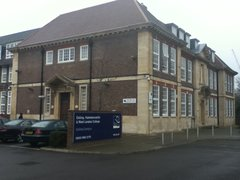
Side front View Ealing, Hammersmith & West London College.

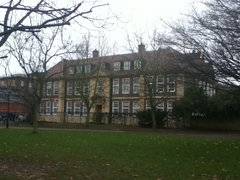
Park View Ealing, Hammersmith & West London College.

Located at The Green in Ealing, it offers a range of full-time post-GCSE vocational courses, as well as tuition in ESOL and English as a Foreign Language (EFL). An £11.5m specialist media facility was launched in December 2005. It is situated in the former Ealing Green High School.

=== Southall Community College ===
On Beaconsfield Road in Southall, a bespoke construction and green skills centre opened in 2023, with additional facilities for ESOL, adult learning and a large SEND provision.

=== Acton ===
A former campus existed on Gunnersbury Lane, Acton.

== Achievements and awards ==
The college was a Beacon Status College, awarded by the Quality Improvement Agency. In 2008, the International Centre at the college was awarded the Queen's Award for Enterprise: International Trade. In 2012, West London College (then Ealing, Hammersmith and West London College) became the first Further Education college in London to receive the 'AoC Charter for International Excellence'. The charter is awarded to FE colleges that show a strong commitment to quality assurance and implement an ethical approach to all aspects of their international activities. In 2017, the college won the Times Educational Supplement FE Award for Outstanding use of Technology for Teaching, Learning and Assessment.

== Former teachers ==
- Prof David Blake, composer (taught music at the boys' grammar school from 1961 to 1962)
- David Tanner (taught history and Head of Sixth Form at Ealing Green)
- Arthur Korn (architect)
- Chris Tooke & Peter Brett (authors) Carpentry & Joinery publications
- Geoffrey Bocking, Keith Critchlow, Roland Whiteside, Harold Bartram, Henry Stephenson, Robin Baker, Anthony Sully - all taught Interior Design at Hammersmith College of Art and Building.
- Robyn Denny, Dick Smith, Bernard Cohen, Tom Simmons (Art), Mike Caddy(Ceramics), Keith Godwin, Henry Thornton (Sculpture), Paul Copplestone (Art History) all taught at Hammersmith College of Art and Building.

== Alumni ==
- Prof Dianne Willcocks, Vice-Chancellor since 1999 of York St John University
- Laurence Broderick, sculptor
- Ralph Miliband, father of Labour Leader Ed Miliband and David Miliband MP
- Trevor Baylis, inventor
- Estelle, singer
- Jamal Edwards
- Shola Ama, singer
- Terri Walker, singer
- Marcus Brigstocke, comedian
- Syed Ahmed, businessman, 'The Apprentice' candidate and Asian Entrepreneur of the Year 2015
- Clarke Carlisle, former professional footballer
- Sir Steve McQueen, director
- David Ajala, actor
- Hajj Adam Babah-Alargi, Ghanaian engineer

=== The Ealing Grammar School for Boys ===
- Graham Barlow, cricketer
- John D Barrow, Professor of Mathematical Sciences at Cambridge University, cosmologist, Templeton Prize winner and author of many popular science books and the award-winning play Infinities was born in Wembley in 1952 and attended Barham Primary School and Ealing Grammar School for Boys from 1964 to 1971.
- Ken Bates, businessman and retired football club chairman.
- John Beattie, rower, 1980 Moscow Olympics, Bronze Medal Coxless Four.
- Lee Brilleaux, musician with Dr. Feelgood
- Martin Cross, rower
- Prof Bill Durodie, academic
- Mike Edwards (musician), member of ELO
- Dr Richard Fortey, palaeontologist and President from 2007 to 2008 of the Geological Society of London
- Air Marshal Sir Michael Giddings, later chaired the public enquiries of four sections of the M25 in the 1970s, the A1/M1 Kirkhamgate-Dishforth scheme in 1982, and the controversial Archway extension in 1984
- Ian Gomm, musician/composer
- Sir Richard Greenbury, Chief Executive from 1988 to 1999 of Marks & Spencer
- Allen Jones (artist)
- Brian Jones (poet)
- Harry Keen, diabetologist
- Richard Leonard, journalist and Labour MP from 1970 to 1974 for Romford
- Ian McNuff, rower, 1980 Moscow Olympics, Bronze Medal Coxless Four.
- David Lloyd Meredith, actor
- Very Rev John Moses, Dean of St Paul's from 1996 to 2006
- Sir Gerald Nabarro, Conservative MP from 1950 to 1964 for Kidderminster, and from 1966 to 1973 for South Worcestershire
- Fred Perry, tennis player
- Don Ryder, Baron Ryder of Eaton Hastings, helped create the Ryder Report
- Colin Slee, Dean of Southwark from 1994 to 2010 and Chaplain of King's College London from 1976 to 1982
- Prof George Temple, Sedleian Professor of Natural Philosophy from 1953 to 1968 at the University of Oxford, Professor of Mathematics from 1932 to 1953 at King's College London, and Chairman from 1961 to 1964 of the Aeronautical Research Council
- John Warr, cricketer
- Mark Whitby, engineer

=== Ealing Green High School ===
- Umer Rashid, cricketer
