= 1979 World Rowing Championships =

International rowing event

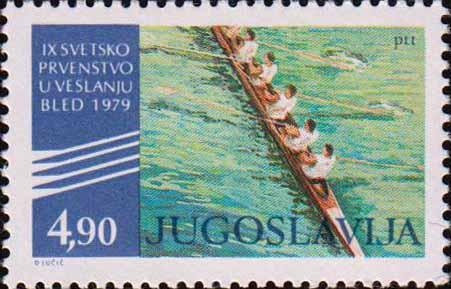
- Yugoslav stamp dedicated to the 1979 World Rowing Championships
- Venue: Lake Bled
- Location: Bled, Slovenia, Yugoslavia
- Dates: 30 August – 9 September

The 1979 World Rowing Championships were World Rowing Championships that were held from 30 August – 9 September 1979 at Bled in Slovenia, Yugoslavia.

== Medal summary ==
=== Men's events ===
Event	Gold	Time	Silver	Time	Bronze	Time
M1x	Finland; Pertti Karppinen	06:58.27	West Germany; Peter-Michael Kolbe	07:04.60	East Germany; Rüdiger Reiche	07:06.55
M2x	Norway; Alf Hansen (b); Frank Hansen (s)	06:26.98	Czechoslovakia; Zdeněk Pecka (b); Václav Vochoska (s)	06:30.46	East Germany; Uwe Heppner (b); Martin Winter (s)	06:32.01
M4x	East Germany; Peter Kersten (b); Klaus Kröppelien (2); Karl-Heinz Bußert (3); Joachim Dreifke (s)	05:50.70	West Germany; Albert Hedderich (b); Raimund Hörmann (2); Dieter Wiedenmann (3); Michael Dürsch(s)	05:54.16	France; Christian Marquis (b); Jean-Raymond Peltier (2); Charles Imbert (3); Roland Weill (s)	05:57.80
M2-	East Germany; Bernd Landvoigt (b); Jörg Landvoigt (s)	06:42.63	Soviet Union; Yuriy Pimenov (b); Nikolay Pimenov (s)	06:45.76	Switzerland; Stefan Netzle (b); Hans Trümpler (s)	06:48.67
M2+	East Germany; Gert Uebeler (b); Jürgen Pfeiffer (s); Georg Spohr (c)	07:06.35	Czechoslovakia; Milan Škopek (b); Josef Plamínek (s); Oldřich Hejdušek (c)	07:06.95	United States; Mark Borchelt (b); Fred Borchelt (s); Christopher Wells (c)	07:09.90
M4-	East Germany; Wolfgang Mager (b); Stefan Semmler (2); Andreas Decker (3); Siegfried Brietzke (s)	06:00.64	Czechoslovakia; Vojtěch Caska (b); Josef Neštický (2); Lubomír Zapletal (3); Jiří Prudil (s)	06:05.30	Great Britain; John Beattie (b); Ian McNuff (2); David Townsend (3); Martin Cross (s)	06:06.65
M4+	East Germany; Bernd Schlufter (b); Walter Dießner (2); Jens Doberschütz (3); Ullrich Dießner (s); Werner Lutz (c)	06:27.24	Soviet Union; Artūrs Garonskis (b); Dzintars Krišjānis (2); Dimants Krišjānis (3); Žoržs Tikmers (s); Juris Bērziņš (c)	06:29.23	West Germany; Andreas Görlich (b); Frank Schütze (2); Wolfram Thiem (3); Wolf-Dieter Oschlies (s); Manfred Klein (c)	06:31.32
M8+	East Germany; Dietmar Schiller (b); Jörg Friedrich (2); Werner Wenzel (3); Friedrich-Wilhelm Ulrich (4); Bernd Höing (5); Ulrich Karnatz (6); Bernd Krauß (7); Ortwin Rodewald; Klaus-Dieter Ludwig (c)	05:36.41	New Zealand; Grant McAuley (b); Tony Brook (2); Tim Logan (3); Gregory Johnston (4); Conrad Robertson (5); Peter Jansen (6); Mark James (7); Robert Robinson (s); Alan Cotter (c)	05:39.92	Soviet Union; Viktor Kokoshyn (b); Ihar Maystrenka (2); Aleksandr Manzevitch (3); Vitaliy Moroz (4); Andrey Ruditsin (5); Oleksandr Tkachenko (6); Andriy Tishchenko (7); Andrey Luhin (s); Hryhoriy Dmytrenko (c)	05:40.69
Lightweight events
LM1x	United States; Bill Belden	7:19.96	Canada; Brian Thorne	7:21.78	Austria; Raimund Haberl	7:25.02
LM2x	Norway; Arne Gilje; Pål Børnick	6:38.08	Netherlands; Harald Punt; Roel Michels	6:44.15	Italy; Mauro Torta; Romano Uberti	6:45.90
LM4-	Great Britain; Ian Wilson (b); Stuart Wilson (2); Colin Barratt (3); Nicholas Howe (s)	06:23.46	Netherlands; Peter van Berkel; Willem Appeldoorn; Richard Helsloot; Paul Paulsen	06:23.99	Switzerland; Reto Wyss; Thomas von Weissenfluh; Pierre Zentner; Pierre Kovacs	06:25.12
LM8+	Spain; Francisco Goicoechea García; Luis Arteaga Leon; Jaime Uriarte García; José Antonio Expósito Sánchez; Antonio Elizalde; Dionisio Redondo González; Javier Puertas Cabezudo; Fernando Climent; Pedro Olasagasti Arruti (cox)	5:53.10	United States; Stephen Schmitt; Scott Strong; Thomas Phillips; Jeff Kroesen; Craig Drake; John Fletcher; Bryan Lewis; William Bater; Robert Brody (cox)	5:53.28	Netherlands; Mark Emke; Henk van der Kwast; Hans Pieterman; Hans Lycklama; Hans Povel; Bert van Baal; Rob Uilenbroek; Ron Velthuis; Gelle Klein Ikkink (cox)	5:55.06

=== Women's events ===
Event	Gold	Time	Silver	Time	Bronze	Time
W1x	Romania; Sanda Toma	03:35.44	East Germany; Martina Schröter	03:38.67	Netherlands; Hette Borrias	03:39.61
W2x	East Germany; Cornelia Linse (b); Heidi Westphal (s)	03:15.95	Bulgaria; Svetla Otsetova (b); Sdravka Jordanova (s)	03:16.31	Romania; Valeria Răcilă (b); Olga Homeghi (s)	03:17.68
W4x+	East Germany; Sybille Tietze (b); Christine Röpke (2); Jutta Lau (3); Roswietha Zobelt (s); Liane Buhr (c)	03:06.75	Bulgaria; Anka Bakova (b); Dolores Nakova (2); Rumelyana Boncheva (3); Mariana Serbezova (s); Ani Filipova (c)	03:07.04	Romania; Maria Micșa (b); Aneta Mihaly (2); Sofia Corban (3); Veronica Juganaru (s); Elena Giurcă (c)	03:08.06
W2-	East Germany; Cornelia Bügel (b); Ute Steindorf (s)	03:27.74	Romania; Florica Dospinescu (b); Elena Oprea (s)	03:30.44	Poland; Małgorzata Dłużewska (b); Czesława Kościańska (s)	03:32.30
W4+	Soviet Union; Valentina Semenova (b); Svetlana Semyonova (2); Galina Stepanova (3); Mariya Fadeyeva (s); Nina Cheremisina (c)	03:17.03	East Germany; Marita Sandig (b); Ute Skorupski (2); Angelika Noack (3); Kersten Neisser (s); Kirsten Wenzel (c)	03:18.25	Romania; Georgeta Militaru-Mașca (b); Florica Silaghi (2); Maria Fricioiu (3); Elena Avram (s); Aneta Matei (c)	03:19.98
W8+	Soviet Union; Nina Antoniuk (b); Tatyana Bunjak (2); Nadezhda Dergatchenko (3); Valentina Yermakova (4); Maria Paziun (5); Elena Tereshina (6); Nina Umanets (7); Olga Pivovarova (s); Nina Frolova (c)	02:58.09	East Germany; Martina Boesler (b); Silvia Fröhlich (2); Petra Köhler (3); Jutta Raeck (4); Renate Neu (5); Ilona Richter (6); Ramona Kapheim (7); Karin Metze (s); Marina Wilke (c)	02:59.36	United States; Carol Brown (b); Carol Bower (2); Susan Tuttle (3); Jeanne Flanagan (4); Patricia Brink (5); Patricia Spratlin (6); Jan Harville (7); Mary O'Connor (s); Hollis Hatton (c)	02:59.91

== Medal table ==
This table does not include the lightweight results.

Place	Nation	1st place, gold medalist(s)	2nd place, silver medalist(s)	3rd place, bronze medalist(s)	Total
1	East Germany	9	3	2	14
2	Soviet Union	2	2	1	5
3	Romania	1	1	3	5
4	Finland	1	0	0	1
4	Norway	1	0	0	1
6	Czechoslovakia	0	3	0	3
7	West Germany	0	2	1	3
8	Bulgaria	0	2	0	2
9	New Zealand	0	1	0	1
10	United States	0	0	2	2
11	France	0	0	1	1
11	Great Britain	0	0	1	1
11	Netherlands	0	0	1	1
11	Poland	0	0	1	1
11	Switzerland	0	0	1	1
Total		14	14	14	42

== Finals ==
Event	1st	2nd	3rd	4th	5th	6th
M1x	Finland	West Germany	East Germany	Sweden	Great Britain	Soviet Union
M2-	East Germany	Soviet Union	Switzerland	Great Britain	West Germany	Denmark
M2+	East Germany	Czechoslovakia	United States	Yugoslavia	Romania	Bulgaria
M2x	Norway	Czechoslovakia	East Germany	Great Britain	Switzerland	West Germany
M4-	East Germany	Czechoslovakia	Great Britain	Soviet Union	Netherlands	Switzerland
M4+	East Germany	Soviet Union	West Germany	United States	Spain	Bulgaria
M4x	East Germany	West Germany	France	Yugoslavia	United States	Bulgaria
M8+	East Germany	New Zealand	Soviet Union	Australia	United States	Great Britain
LM1x	United States	Canada	Austria	West Germany	Spain	Switzerland
LM2x	Norway	Netherlands	Italy	United States	Switzerland	Spain
LM4-	Great Britain	Netherlands	Switzerland	West Germany	Denmark	Australia
LM8+	Spain	United States	Netherlands	West Germany	Great Britain	Australia
W1x	Romania	East Germany	Netherlands	Canada	United States	Bulgaria
W2-	East Germany	Romania	Poland	Netherlands	United States	Bulgaria
W2x	East Germany	Bulgaria	Romania	Soviet Union	United States	Poland
W4+	Soviet Union	East Germany	Romania	Bulgaria	Australia	West Germany
W4x+	East Germany	Bulgaria	Romania	Soviet Union	Hungary	United States
W8+	Soviet Union	East Germany	United States	Romania	Canada	Bulgaria

== Great Britain ==
Nine men's teams (three lightweight) and four women's teams from Great Britain competed at the championships.

Event		Notes
M1x	Hugh Matheson	5th in A final
M2-	Charles Wiggin & Malcolm Carmichael	4th in A final
M2+	N/A	no entry
M2x	Chris Baillieu & Jim Clark	4th in A final
M4-	Martin Cross, David Townsend, Ian McNuff, John Beattie	Bronze medal
M4+	James Svenson-Taylor, Peter Hope, Simon Leifer, Paul Reynolds	1st in B final (7th overall)
M4x	N/A	no entry
M8+	Lenny Robertson, Eric Sims, Mark Bathurst, Neil Christie, James MacLeod; Gordon Rankine, Colin Seymour, John Roberts, Alan Inns (cox)	6th in A final
LM1x	N/A	no entry
LM2x	Mark Cushway & Peter Boosey	2nd in B final
LM4-	Ian Wilson, Stuart Wilson, Colin Barratt, Nicholas Howe	Gold medal
LM8+	Stephen Simpole, Nigel Read, Christopher Drury, Colin Cusack, John Melvin; Peter Zeun, Duncan Innes, Richard Stuart, Paul Jenkinson (cox)	5th in A final
W1x	Beryl Mitchell	13th place
W2-	N/A	no entry
W2x	Pauline Hart & Astrid Ayling	1st in B final
W4+	Yvonne Earl, Bernadette Casey, Lin Clark, Gillian Webb, Nicky Mason (cox)	4th in B final
W4x+	N/A	no entry
W8+	Jean Genchi, Nicola Boyes, Stephanie Price, Liz Paton, Sue Handscomb; Rosemary Clugston, Clara Bayles, Beverly Jones, Nicky Zarach (cox)	3rd in B final
