= Rowing at the 1980 Summer Olympics – Men's coxless four =

Men's coxless four at the Games of the XXII Olympiad
- Venue: Krylatskoye Rowing Canal
- Date: 20–27 July 1980
- Competitors: 44 from 11 nations

Medalists
| 1st place, gold medalist(s) | | Siegfried Brietzke; Andreas Decker; Stefan Semmler; Jürgen Thiele | East Germany |
| 2nd place, silver medalist(s) | | Aleksey Kamkin; Valeriy Dolinin; Aleksandr Kulagin; Vitali Eliseev | Soviet Union |
| 3rd place, bronze medalist(s) | | John Beattie; Ian McNuff; David Townsend; Martin Cross | Great Britain |

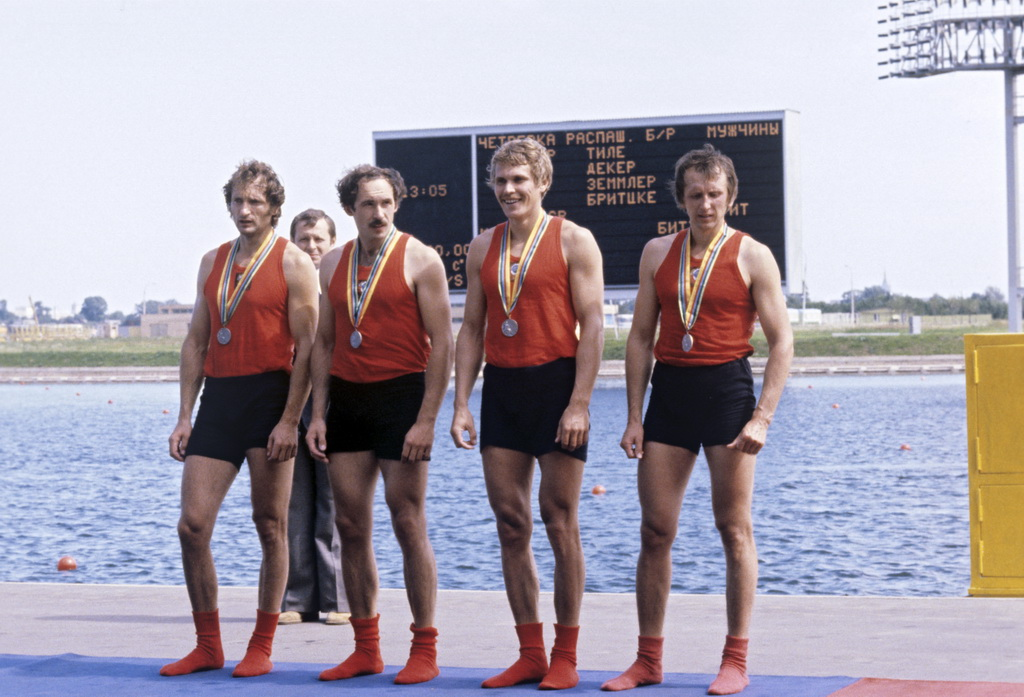
The silver medalists

The men's coxless four (M4-) rowing competition at the 1980 Summer Olympics took place at Krylatskoye Sports Complex Canoeing and Rowing Basin, Moscow, Soviet Union. The event was held from 20 to 27 July.

== Heats ==
Winner of each heat advanced to final. The remaining teams must compete in repechage for the remaining spots in the final.

=== Heat One ===
| Rank | Rowers | Country | Time |
|---|---|---|---|
| 1 | Aleksey Kamkin, Valeriy Dolinin, Aleksandr Kulagin, Vitali Eliseev | Soviet Union | 6:31.71 |
| 2 | Vojtěch Caska, Jiří Prudil, Josef Neštický, Lubomír Zapletal | Czechoslovakia | 6:43.30 |
| 3 | Georgi Georgiev, Lachezar Boychev, Kiril Kirchev, Valentin Stoev | Bulgaria | 6:47.21 |
| 4 | Jean-Pierre Bremer, Nicolas Lourdaux, Bernard Bruand, Dominique Basset | France | 6:50.18 |
| 5 | Mirosław Jarzembowski, Mariusz Trzciński, Henryk Trzciński, Marek Niedziałkowski | Poland | 6:55.28 |
| 6 | Wenceslao Borroto, Ismael Carbonell, Jorge Álvarez, Hermenegildo Palacio | Cuba | 7:02.83 |

=== Heat Two ===
| Rank | Rowers | Country | Time |
|---|---|---|---|
| 1 | Siegfried Brietzke, Andreas Decker, Stefan Semmler, Jürgen Thiele | East Germany | 6:19.93 |
| 2 | Daniel Voiculescu, Carolică Ilieş, Petru Iosub, Nicolae Simion | Romania | 6:32.16 |
| 3 | Jürg Weitnauer, Bruno Saile, Hans-Konrad Trümpler, Stefan Netzle | Switzerland | 6:32.74 |
| 4 | John Beattie, Ian McNuff, David Townsend, Martin Cross | Great Britain | 6:42.73 |
| 5 | Kent Larsson, Pär Hurtig, Jan Nicklasson, Göran Johansson | Sweden | 6:49.78 |

== Repechage ==
The top two teams in each repechage heat qualified for the final.

=== Heat One ===
| Rank | Rowers | Country | Time |
|---|---|---|---|
| 1 | Jürg Weitnauer, Bruno Saile, Hans-Konrad Trümpler, Stefan Netzle | Switzerland | 6:16.07 |
| 2 | Vojtěch Caska, Jiří Prudil, Josef Neštický, Lubomír Zapletal | Czechoslovakia | 6:18.49 |
| 3 | Jean-Pierre Bremer, Nicolas Lourdaux, Bernard Bruand, Dominique Basset | France | 6:19.21 |
| 4 | Kent Larsson, Pär Hurtig, Jan Nicklasson, Göran Johansson | Sweden | 6:29.33 |
| 5 | Wenceslao Borroto, Ismael Carbonell, Jorge Álvarez, Hermenegildo Palacio | Cuba | 6:40.84 |

=== Heat Two ===
| Rank | Rowers | Country | Time |
|---|---|---|---|
| 1 | John Beattie, Ian McNuff, David Townsend, Martin Cross | Great Britain | 6:12.71 |
| 2 | Daniel Voiculescu, Carolică Ilieş, Petru Iosub, Nicolae Simion | Romania | 6:13.31 |
| 3 | Georgi Georgiev, Lachezar Boychev, Kiril Kirchev, Valentin Stoev | Bulgaria | 6:22.57 |
| 4 | Mirosław Jarzembowski, Mariusz Trzciński, Henryk Trzciński, Marek Niedziałkowski | Poland | 6:30.26 |

== Finals ==
=== Finals A ===
| Rank | Rowers | Country | Time |
|---|---|---|---|
| 1st place, gold medalist(s) | Siegfried Brietzke, Andreas Decker, Stefan Semmler, Jürgen Thiele | East Germany | 6:08.17 |
| 2nd place, silver medalist(s) | Aleksey Kamkin, Valeriy Dolinin, Aleksandr Kulagin, Vitali Eliseev | Soviet Union | 6:11.81 |
| 3rd place, bronze medalist(s) | John Beattie, Ian McNuff, David Townsend, Martin Cross | Great Britain | 6:16.58 |
| 4 | Vojtěch Caska, Jiří Prudil, Josef Neštický, Lubomír Zapletal | Czechoslovakia | 6:18.63 |
| 5 | Daniel Voiculescu, Carolică Ilieş, Petru Iosub, Nicolae Simion | Romania | 6:19.45 |
| 6 | Jürg Weitnauer, Bruno Saile, Hans-Konrad Trümpler, Stefan Netzle | Switzerland | 6:26.46 |

=== Finals B ===
| Rank | Rowers | Country | Time |
|---|---|---|---|
| 7 | Jean-Pierre Bremer, Nicolas Lourdaux, Bernard Bruand, Dominique Basset | France | 6:19.06 |
| 8 | Mirosław Jarzembowski, Mariusz Trzciński, Henryk Trzciński, Marek Niedziałkowski | Poland | 6:22.31 |
| 9 | Georgi Georgiev, Lachezar Boychev, Kiril Kirchev, Valentin Stoev | Bulgaria | 6:22.49 |
| 10 | Kent Larsson, Pär Hurtig, Jan Nicklasson, Göran Johansson | Sweden | 6:23.61 |
| 11 | Wenceslao Borroto, Ismael Carbonell, Jorge Álvarez, Hermenegildo Palacio | Cuba | 6:36.20 |

== Sources ==
- Fizkultura i Sport, ed. (1981). The Official Report of the Games of the XXII Olympiad Moscow 1980 Volume Three (PDF). p. 110.
