= Stuart Wilson (rower) =

Former British-Australian rower

Personal information
- Born: First quarter 1954 Nottingham, Nottinghamshire

Sport
- Sport: Rowing
Medal record
Men's rowing
Representing Great Britain
World Rowing Championships
Gold medal – first place	1979 Bled	Lwt men's four

Stuart Wilson (born 1954) is a retired British lightweight rower. He became world champion in the lightweight men's four at the 1979 World Rowing Championships. He moved to Australia in 1982 and competed for his adopted country at the 1984 World Rowing Championships.

== Family ==
Stuart A Wilson is a brother of international rowers Ian Wilson and Andrew Wilson.

After representing Great Britain, Stuart Wilson emigrated to Australia in 1982 to marry his partner, Australian lightweight rower Leisa Paterson. She had represented her country in the women's coxed quad scull at the 1978 World Rowing Championships in Cambridge, New Zealand. They had a son James Wilson, who is also an international rower for Australia. Leisa Wilson died in February 2017 after a long illness.

== Rowing career ==
=== Representing Great Britain ===
Ian and Stuart Wilson rowed with the lightweight men's four at the 1979 World Rowing Championships in Bled where they became world champions. The two brothers then competed in the lightweight men's double scull and came fourth at the 1980 World Rowing Championships in Hazewinkel.

=== Representing Australia ===
Wilson was first selected to represent Australia in the lightweight men's eight at the 1978 FISA Lightweight Championships in Copenhagen, but he had not been in Australia for long enough and was ineligible. He was replaced by Jeff Sykes, and the Australian team went on to win bronze.

At the 1984 World Rowing Championships, Ian and Stuart Wilson made history by competing against each other representing different countries. The brothers rowed in the lightweight men's four, and Ian Wilson won bronze with the British team, while Stuart Wilson's Australian team came sixth.

== After rowing ==
Wilson is general manager for Sykes Racing, a manufacturer of rowing shells based in Geelong, and has been with the company since 1981. His son James is also employed by Sykes Racing.
