= Nicklasson =

Nicklasson is a Swedish surname. Notable people with this surname include:

- Andreas Nicklasson (born 1978), Swedish football player
- Daniel Nicklasson (born 1981), Swedish football player
- Göran Nicklasson (1942–2018), Swedish football player
- Jan Nicklasson (born 1954), Swedish rower
- Michael Nicklasson, Swedish musician
