= Trzciński =

Trzciński is a Polish surname. Other forms are Trzcinski (outside Poland) or Trzcińska (feminine). Notable people with the surname include:

- Danielle Trzcinski, American actor and comedian
- Edmund Trzcinski (1921–1996), American playwright
- Henryk Trzciński (born 1954), Polish rower
- Krzysztof Trzciński, known as Krzysztof Komeda (1931 – 23 April 1969), Polish film score composer and jazz pianist
- Maria Trzcińska (1931–2011), Polish judge
- Mariusz Trzciński (born 1954), Polish rower, twin brother of Henryk
- Wojciech Trzciński (1949–2025), Polish composer and musician

== See also ==
- Trzcińskie, a village in north-eastern Poland
- Trzcińsk, a village in northern Poland
- Kuźnica Trzcińska, a village in west-central Poland
