= Borroto =

Borroto is a surname. Notable people with the surname include:

- Evelina Borroto (born 1949), Cuban volleyball player
- Luis Borroto (born 1982), Cuban baseball player
- Mario Borroto, Cuban baseball player
- Wenceslao Borroto (born 1958), Cuban rower
