= Cabezudo =

Cabezudo is a surname. Notable people with the surname include:

- Javier Puertas Cabezudo (fl. 1977–1982), Spanish lightweight rower
- Juan José Cabezudo (c. 1800–c. 1860), Afro-Peruvian cook
