= Röpke =

Röpke (also Roepke or Röpcke (German: [ˈʁœpkə])) is a Low German surname (with a Danish variant spelled Røpke) with several possible origins.

Notable people with the surname include:

- Christine Röpke (fl. 1977–1980), East German rower
- Jo Röpcke (1928–2007), Belgian film critic, film journalist, director and television host
- Kenneth Røpke (1965–2026), Danish cyclist
- Kurt Röpke (1896–1966), German general during World War II
- Marie Røpke (born 1987), Danish badminton player
- Oliver Röpke (born 1971), Austrian trade unionist
- Wilhelm Röpke (1899–1966), German economist and social critic
