= David Hosking =

David or Dave Hosking may refer to:

- Dave Hosking, member of the Australian indie rock-folk music band Boy & Bear
- David Hosking (cricketer) (born 1941), New Zealand cricketer
- David Hosking (rower), British lightweight rower
- David Hosking (rugby league), Australian rugby league player
