= List of Grand Prix motorcycle racers: E =

Name	Seasons	World Championships	MotoGP Wins	500cc Wins	350cc Wins	Moto2 Wins	250cc Wins	Moto3 Wins	125cc Wins	80cc Wins	50cc Wins	MotoE Wins
(United Kingdom) Stuart Easton	2000-2001	0	0	0	0	0	0	0	0	0	0	0
(Germany) Harald Eckl	1982-1992	0	0	0	0	0	0	0	0	0	0	0
(United States) Colin Edwards	2003-2014	0	0	0	0	0	0	0	0	0	0	0
(United Kingdom) Stuart Edwards	1986-1990, 2001	0	0	0	0	0	0	0	0	0	0	0
(South Africa) Jon Ekerold	1975-1983	1; 350cc - 1980	0	0	6	0	1	0	0	0	0	0
(Spain) Toni Elías	1999-2013, 2015	1 Moto2 - 2010	1	0	0	7	7	0	2	0	0	0
(Spain) Antonio Elizalde	1951, 1954	0	0	0	0	0	0	0	0	0	0	0
(United Kingdom) Christian Elkin	2002, 2004-2005	0	0	0	0	0	0	0	0	0	0	0
(United Kingdom) James Ellison	2004-2006, 2012	0	0	0	0	0	0	0	0	0	0	0
(Germany) Ingo Emmerich	1974-1975, 1977-1983	0	0	0	0	0	0	0	0	0	1	0
(Italy) Armando Errico	1984-1986	0	0	0	0	0	0	0	0	0	0	0
(Spain) Álex Escrig	2022-	0	3	0	0	0	0	0	0	0	0	0
(France) Michel Escudier	1985	0	0	0	0	0	0	0	0	0	0	0
(United States) Danny Eslick	2016	0	0	0	0	0	0	0	0	0	0	0
(Spain) Aleix Espargaró	2004-2025	0	3	0	0	0	0	0	0	0	0	0
(Spain) Pol Espargaró	2006-2025	1 Moto2 - 2013	0	0	0	10	0	0	5	0	0	0
(France) Thierry Espié	1977-1985	0	0	0	0	0	0	0	0	0	0	0
(Spain) Joel Esteban	2024-	0	0	0	0	0	0	0	0	0	0	0
(France) Christian Estrosi	1976-1983	0	0	0	0	0	0	0	0	0	0	0
