= Ian Wilson (rower) =

British rower (born 1951)

Personal information
- Born: July 1951 Nottingham, Nottinghamshire, England

Sport
- Sport: Rowing
Medal record
Men's rowing
Representing Great Britain
World Rowing Championships
Gold medal – first place	1979 Bled	Lwt men's four
Silver medal – second place	1983 Duisburg	Lwt men's four
Bronze medal – third place	1984 Montreal	Lwt men's four

Ian John Wilson (born 1951) is a retired British lightweight rower who competed for Great Britain.

== Biography ==
Wilson is a brother of international rowers Stuart Wilson and Andrew Wilson. Ian Wilson first competed internationally with the men's eight at the 1975 World Rowing Championships in Nottingham where the team came 9th overall after finishing in third place in the B final. In 1978 he was part of the lightweight double scull with Daniel Topolski that finished 7th overall after winning the B final at the 1978 FISA Lightweight Championships in Copenhagen.

Ian and Stuart Wilson then rowed with the lightweight men's four at the 1979 World Rowing Championships in Bled where they became world champions. The two brothers then competed in the lightweight men's double scull and came fourth at the 1980 World Rowing Championships in Hazewinkel. At the 1983 World Rowing Championships in Duisburg, Ian Wilson won a silver medal in the lightweight men's four event. His youngest brother, Andrew, competes at the same championships with the lightweight men's eight.

At the 1984 World Rowing Championships, Ian and Stuart Wilson made history by competing against each other representing different countries. Stuart Wilson had emigrated to Australia in 1982 to marry his partner, Australian lightweight rower Leisa Patterson. The brothers rowed in the lightweight men's four event: Ian Wilson won bronze with the British team, while Stuart Wilson's Australian team came sixth.

At the 1985 World Rowing Championships in Hazewinkel, Ian and Andrew Wilson rowed together in the lightweight men's eight where they came ninth.

Wilson has competed at Henley Royal Regatta, winning seven times:

- 1975 with University of London Boat Club ( London School of Economics). Winners of the Ladies Plate and Prince Philip Cup.
- 1976 with Thames Tradesmen Rowing Club. Winners of the Grand Challenge Cup, and Prince Philip Cup.
- 1980 with Nottingham Boat Club. Winners of the Wyfold Challenge Cup.
- 1982 with Nottingham Boat Club. Winners of the Wyfold Challenge Cup.
- 1984 with Nottinghamshire County Rowing Association. Winners of the Wyfold Challenge Cup.

In 1981 he was a founding member of Nottinghamshire County Rowing Association and is currently chairman.
