= David Townsend (rower) =

British rower (born 1955)

Personal information
- Born: David G. H. Townsend; 28 August 1955 (age 70) Birmingham, West Midlands

Sport
- Sport: Rowing
Medal record
Men's rowing
Representing Great Britain
Bronze medal – third place	1980 Moscow	Coxless four
World Championships
Bronze medal – third place	1978 Karapiro	Coxless four
Bronze medal – third place	1979 Bled	Coxless four

David G. H. Townsend (born 28 August 1955) is a British rower who competed in the 1976 Summer Olympics and in the 1980 Summer Olympics.

== Rowing career ==
Townsend was part of the eight that at the 1975 World Rowing Championships in Nottingham, the crew finished 9th overall after a third-place finish in the B final. The following year he was a crew member of the British boat which finished twelfth in the coxless four event at the 1976 Olympic Games.

In 1978 along with John Beattie, Ian McNuff, and Martin Cross, he was a member of the British coxless four boat, coached by David Tanner which won the bronze medal in the World Rowing Championships at Lake Karapiro, New Zealand behind Russia and East Germany. The following year in 1979 along with John Beattie, Ian McNuff and Martin Cross he was a member of the British coxless four boat which won the bronze medal in the World Rowing Championships at Bled, Yugoslavia behind East Germany and Czechoslovakia. Coached by David Tanner

In the 1980 Moscow Olympics along with John Beattie, Ian McNuff and Martin Cross he was a crew member of the British boat (again coached by David Tanner) which won the bronze medal in the Olympic coxless fours event behind East Germany and Russia.
