= Luis Arteaga =

Luis Arteaga may refer to:

- Luis Arteaga García (1871–1938), Chilean civil servant and politician, minister of foreign affairs in 1938
- Luis Arteaga León (fl. 1970s), Spanish competitive rower
- Luis Arteaga Ramírez (died 1896), Chilean Army general, minister of war and navy in 1892–1893
