= Maginn =

Maginn is a surname. Notable people with the surname include:

- Adrian Maginn (born 1954), Australian former rower and rowing coach
- Bonnie Maginn (1880–1964), American actor
- Edward Maginn (1802–1849), Irish Roman Catholic priest, advocate of Catholic Emancipation, supporter of Daniel O'Connell in the Repeal movement
- Edward Joseph Maginn (1897–1984), Scottish-born American Catholic Bishop for Albany, New York State
- Francis Maginn (1861–1918), Church of Ireland missionary and one of the co-founders of British Deaf Association
- Matt Maginn, musician from Omaha, Nebraska
- Robert Maginn (born 1956), United States businessman, former chairman in the Massachusetts Republican Party
- Simon Maginn (born 1961), British writer
- William Maginn (1794–1842), Irish journalist and miscellaneous writer

== See also ==
- Bishop Maginn High School, a Catholic high school in Albany, New York State
- Maginn Park, a football stadium located in Buncrana, County Donegal, Ireland
