= Colin Barrett =

Colin Barrett may refer to:

- Colin Barrett (footballer) (born 1952), English footballer
- Colin Barrett (author) (born 1982), Irish Canadian writer
- George Barrett (jockey) (Colin George Barrett, 1863–1898), British jockey

== See also ==
- Colin Barratt (born 1948), British rower
