= Trumpler =

Trumpler or Trümpler may refer to:

== Surname ==
- Hans-Konrad Trümpler (born 1960), Swiss rower
- Robert Julius Trumpler (1886–1956), Swiss-American astronomer

== Astronomy ==
- Trumpler (lunar crater), a lunar impact crater
- Trumpler (Martian crater), a crater in the Phaethontis quadrangle of Mars
- Trumpler classification
