= Stephanie Price =

Stephanie Price may refer to:

- Stephanie Price (athlete) (born 1972), Australian hurdler
- Stephanie Price (rower) (born 1953), British rower
