= Pedro Olasagasti Arruti =

Spanish rower

Sport
- Sport: Rowing
Medal record
Men's rowing
Representing Spain
World Rowing Championships
Gold medal – first place	1979 Bled	Lwt eight

Pedro Olasagasti Arruti is a Spanish coxswain. He won a gold medal at the 1979 World Rowing Championships in Bled with the lightweight men's eight.
