= Yvonne Earl =

British rower

Personal information
- Nationality: British

Sport
- Sport: Rowing
- Club: Civil Service Ladies

Yvonne Earl is a retired British rower who competed for Great Britain.

== Rowing career ==
Earl was part of the coxed four that finished 9th overall and fourth in the B final at the 1977 World Rowing Championships in Amsterdam.

She later competed at the 1979 World Rowing Championships.
