= Kent Larsson (rower) =

Swedish rower (1951–2019)

Personal information
- Full name: Kent Ronny Oskar Larsson
- Nationality: Swedish
- Born: 3 December 1951; Borås, Sweden
- Died: 21 October 2019 (aged 67)

Sport
- Sport: Rowing

Kent Ronny Oskar Larsson (3 December 1951 – 21 October 2019) was a Swedish rower. He competed in the men's coxless four event at the 1980 Summer Olympics.
