= Aleksandr Kulagin =

Retired Russian rower

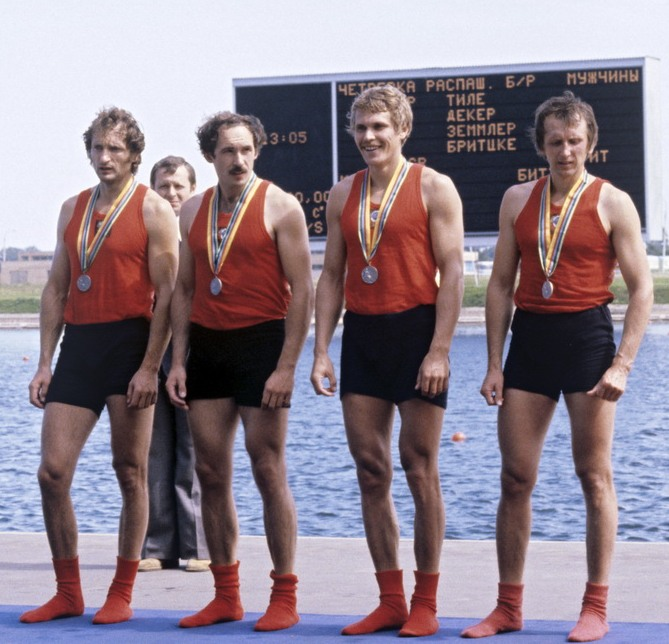
- Kamkin, Dolinin, Kulagin and Eliseyev at the 1980 Olympics

Personal information
- Full name: Aleksandr Viktorovich Kulagin
- Born: 29 June 1954 (age 72) Kaliningrad, Russia
- Height: 1.87 m (6 ft 2 in)
- Weight: 88 kg (194 lb)

Sport
- Sport: Rowing
- Club: Burevestnik Moskva
Medal record
Men's rowing
Representing the Soviet Union
Olympic Games
Silver medal – second place	1980 Moscow	Coxless four
World Championships
Gold medal – first place	1977 Amsterdam	Coxless pair
Gold medal – first place	1981 Münich	Coxless four
Silver medal – second place	1982 Lucerne	Coxless four
Silver medal – second place	1983 Duisburg	Coxless four

Aleksandr Viktorovich Kulagin (Russian: Александр Викторович Кулагин, born 29 June 1954) is a retired Russian rower who had his best achievements in the coxless fours, together with Valeriy Dolinin, Aleksey Kamkin and Vitaly Eliseyev. In this event they won a world title in 1981 and silver medals at the 1980 Summer Olympics and 1982 World Rowing Championships. Kulagin and Eliseev also won a world title in the coxless pairs in 1977.

After retiring from competitions Kulagin worked as a rowing coach, training Mikhail Belikov, Merab Chermashentsev and Aleksandr Bogdashin.
