= Aleksey Kamkin =

Russian rower

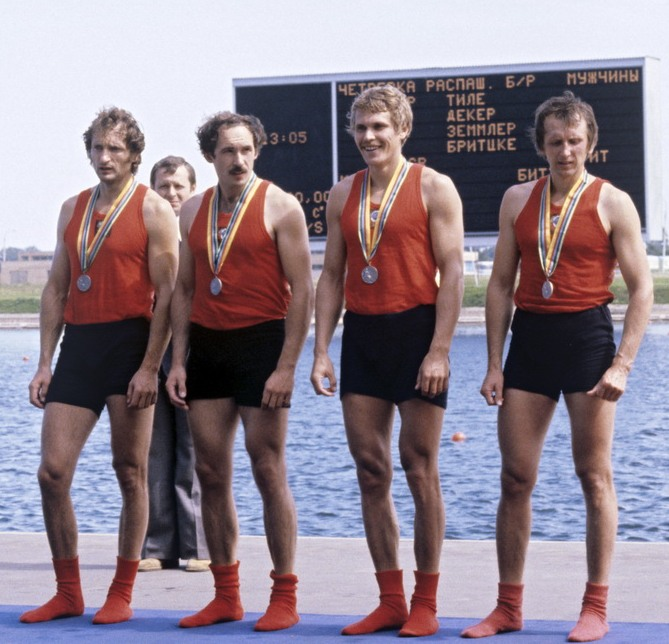
- Kamkin, Dolinin, Kulagin and Eliseyev at the 1980 Olympics

Personal information
- Full name: Aleksey Dmitrievich Kamkin
- Born: 15 October 1952 (age 73) Kaliningrad, Russia
- Height: 1.87 m (6 ft 2 in)
- Weight: 82 kg (181 lb)

Sport
- Sport: Rowing
- Club: VS Leningrad
Medal record
Representing the Soviet Union
Olympic Games
| Silver medal – second place | 1980 Moscow | Coxless four |
World Championships
| Gold medal – first place | 1981 Münich | Coxless four |
| Silver medal – second place | 1982 Lucerne | Coxless four |

Aleksey Dmitrievich Kamkin (Russian: Алексей Дмитриевич Камкин, born 15 October 1952) is a retired Russian rower who had his best achievements in the coxless fours, together with Valeriy Dolinin, Aleksandr Kulagin and Vitaly Eliseyev. In this event they won a world title in 1981 and silver medals at the 1980 Summer Olympics and 1982 World Rowing Championships.

After retiring from competition Kamkin worked as a rowing coach at the national level. Between 1984 and 1991 he coached the Soviet Army team and prepared two national champions.
