= Carolică Ilieș =

Romanian rower

Personal information
- Nationality: Romanian
- Born: 18 January 1962 (age 63)

Sport
- Sport: Rowing

Carolică Ilieș (born 18 January 1962) is a Romanian rower. He competed in the men's coxless four event at the 1980 Summer Olympics.
