= Göran Johansson (rower) =

Swedish rower (1957–2021)

Personal information
- Nationality: Swedish
- Born: 15 March 1957 Gothenburg, Sweden
- Died: 30 October 2021 (aged 64)

Sport
- Sport: Rowing

Göran Johansson (15 March 1957 – 30 October 2021) was a Swedish rower. He competed in the men's coxless four event at the 1980 Summer Olympics. Johansson died on 30 October 2021, at the age of 64.
