= Valeriy Dolinin =

Russian rower (1953–2021)

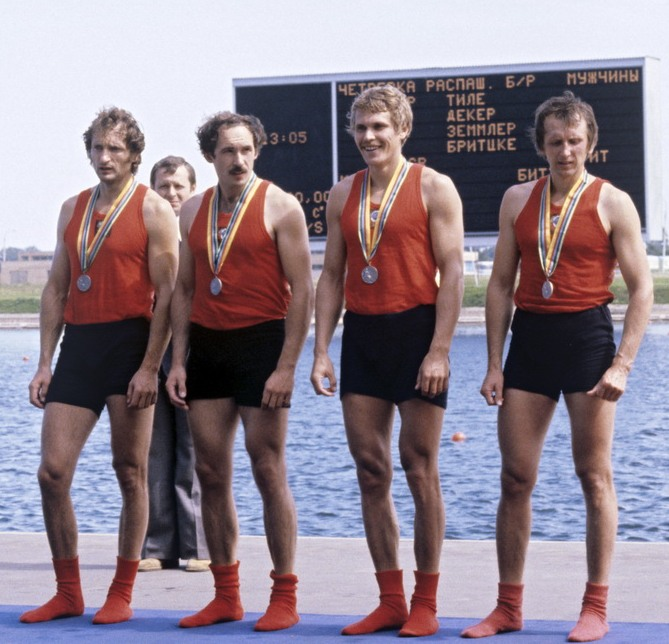
- Kamkin, Dolinin, Kulagin and Eliseyev at the 1980 Olympics

Personal information
- Born: 25 July 1953 Leningrad, Russian SFSR, Soviet Union
- Died: 15 November 2021 (aged 68)
- Height: 1.91 m (6 ft 3 in)
- Weight: 87 kg (192 lb)

Sport
- Sport: Rowing
- Club: Trud Saint Petersburg
Medal record
Men's rowing
Representing the Soviet Union
Olympic Games
Silver medal – second place	1980 Moscow	Coxless four
Bronze medal – third place	1976 Montreal	Coxless four
World Championships
Gold medal – first place	1978 Hamilton	Coxless four
Gold medal – first place	1981 Münich	Coxless four
Silver medal – second place	1977 Amsterdam	Eight
Silver medal – second place	1982 Lucerne	Coxless four

Valeriy Alekseyevich Dolinin (Russian: Валерий Алексеевич Долинин, 25 July 1953 – 15 November 2021) was a Russian rower who specialized in the coxless fours. In this event, he won a world title in 1981 and silver medals at the 1980 Summer Olympics and 1982 World Rowing Championships (with Aleksandr Kulagin, Aleksey Kamkin, and Vitaly Eliseyev), as well as a world title in 1977 and an Olympic bronze in 1976 with other teams.

Dolinin was professor at the faculty of physical education of the Radioelectronics Institute of A. S. Popov, he held a Navy rank of Captain.
