= Robert Robinson (rower) =

New Zealand rower

Medal record

Men's rowing

Representing New Zealand

World Rowing Championships
| Silver medal – second place | 1979 Bled | Eight |

Robert Robinson is a retired New Zealand rower.

Robinson competed with the New Zealand men's four at the 1978 World Rowing Championships at Lake Karapiro near Cambridge where the team came seventh. The following year, he won a silver medal with the New Zealand eight at the 1979 World Rowing Championships at Bled in Slovenia, Yugoslavia. He was again part of the men's eight at the 1981 World Rowing Championships in Munich where the team came seventh.
