= Dennis Hatcher =

Australian rower (1953–2024)

Personal information
- Nationality: Australian
- Born: 2 April 1953 Adelaide, South Australia, Australia
- Died: 9 June 2024 (aged 71) Canberra, Australian Capital Territory, Australia

Sport
- Country: Australia
- Sport: Rowing
- Club: Adelaide University Boat Club; Melbourne University Boat Club
Medal record
Representing Australia
World Rowing Championships
Bronze medal – third place	1978 Copenhagen	LM8+

Dennis Hatcher (2 April 1953 – 9 June 2024) was an Australian rower and sports administrator. He was an Australian national champion rower and won a bronze medal at the 1978 World Rowing Championships in the lightweight division. He held major leadership positions at the Northern Territory Institute of Sport, Australian Institute of Sport, Aspire Academy and Aspire Hospital.

Hatcher was born in Adelaide and obtained Bachelor of Science and Bachelor of Education at the University of Adelaide and Adelaide College of Advanced Education respectively. In 1984, he completed a PhD in physiology at Monash University. He died after a long battle with cancer at Canberra Hospital, on 9 June 2024, at the age of 71.

== Rowing ==
=== Club and state rowing ===
Hatcher's senior rowing was from the Adelaide University Boat Club and later the Mercantile Rowing Club in Melbourne.

State representation first came for Hatcher in 1973 in the South Australian men's heavyweight eight contesting the King's Cup at the Interstate Regatta within the Australian Rowing Championships. He rowed in two further South Australian King's Cup eights in 1976 and 1977 and stroked both those crews.

In 1974 and 1976 Hatcher rowed in Adelaide University eights at the Australian Intervarsity Championships. The 1974 crew won the championship title.

By 1979 Hatcher was rowing from the Mercantile Rowing Club as a lightweight and was selected to the Victorian lightweight four who contested and won the Penrith Cup at the 1979 Interstate Regatta. In an MUBC crew he won the lightweight eight national title in 1979.

=== International representative rowing ===
Hatcher made his Australian representative debut at the 1978 World Rowing Championships in Copenhagen in the Australian men's lightweight eight. That crew won a bronze medal. For the 1979 in Bled, Hatcher was again in the Australian lightweight eight which finished in overall sixth place.

=== Rowing selector ===
Hatcher was a selector for Australian representative squads for six World Rowing Championships from 1989 to 1994 and for the 1992 Summer Olympics. Most notably, his involvement in the selection of the Oarsome Foursome rowing team for the 1990 World Rowing Championships along with coach Noel Donaldson and other national selectors.

== Sports administration ==
Hatcher was appointed the inaugural Director of the Northern Territory Institute of Sport. He departed the Institute in 2000. From 2002 to 2009, he was the Assistant Director, Sports Science and Sports Medicine at the Australian Institute of Sport. He held major sports science and medicine in Qatar from 2009 to 2015 - Head of Sport Science at the Aspire Academy and then Head of Sports Science at the Aspetar Hospital. After returning to Australia, he established the consultancy Performance Matters that advised national sports organisations on high performance sport issues.
