= Martin Cross =

British rower (born 1957)

Personal information
- Born: 19 July 1957 (age 68) London, England

Sport
- Club: Thames Tradesmen's RC; London RC
Medal record
Men's rowing
Representing Great Britain
Olympic Games
Gold medal – first place	1984 Los Angeles	Coxed four
Bronze medal – third place	1980 Moscow	Coxless four
World Championships
Bronze medal – third place	1978 Karapiro	Coxless four
Bronze medal – third place	1979 Bled	Coxless four
Bronze medal – third place	1991 Vienna	Eight
Silver medal – second place	1985 Hazewinkel	Coxless pair
Representing England
Commonwealth Games
Gold medal – first place	1986 Edinburgh	coxed four

Martin Patrick Cross (born 19 July 1957) is a British retired oarsman, and current teacher.

== Early life and education ==
Born in London, Cross was educated at Cardinal Vaughan Memorial School He studied at Queen Mary, University of London, rowing for the college boat club.

== Career ==
=== Rowing ===
In 1975, Cross along with John Beattie, Robin Roberts and Ian McNuff was a crew member of the Ealing High Schools coxless fours boat coached by their history teacher David Tanner (later Sir David Tanner CBE) which won the silver medal at the World Junior Rowing Championships for Great Britain in Montreal behind East Germany and ahead of West Germany. The following year he was part of the coxless four that finished 10th overall after a fourth-place finish in the B final at the 1977 World Rowing Championships in Amsterdam.

In 1978 along with Beattie, David Townsend and McNuff he was a member of the British coxless four boat (coached by Tanner) which won the bronze medal in the 1978 World Rowing Championships at Karapiro, New Zealand behind Russia and East Germany. The following year in 1979 he was a member of the British coxless four boat (again with Beattie, Townsend and McNuff and coached by Tanner) which won the bronze medal in the 1979 World Rowing Championships at Bled, Yugoslavia behind East Germany and Czechoslovakia. In the 1980 Moscow Olympics with Beattie, Townsend and McNuff he was a crew member of the British boat which won the bronze medal in the Olympic coxless fours event behind East Germany and Russia. Coached by David Tanner

Cross won the gold medal in the coxed four at the 1984 Los Angeles Olympics with Steve Redgrave, Richard Budgett, Andy Holmes, and Adrian Ellison.

He won a gold medal representing England in the coxed four, at the 1986 Commonwealth Games in Edinburgh, Scotland. He also won a silver medal in the coxless pairs at the World Championships in 1985 and a bronze medal in the eight at the World Championships in 1991.

He has been described by his close friends as "An inspiration to not just the rowing world, but the whole of the sporting world." Cross now lives with his wife, three children and two dogs in London.

=== Writing and journalism ===
He published an autobiography, Olympic Obsession in 2001, and is currently working part-time as a history teacher at Hampton School. He writes about rowing for The Guardian and co-commentates with Greg Searle for the International Rowing Federation on the World Rowing Cup and World Rowing Championships events.
