= Bernd Schlufter =

German rower

Sport
- Sport: Rowing
Medal record
Men's rowing
Representing East Germany
World Rowing Championships
Gold medal – first place	1979 Bled	Four

Bernd Schlufter is a German rower. He won a gold medal at the 1979 World Rowing Championships in Bled with the men's coxed four.
