= Vitaliy Eliseyev =

Russian rower

Vitali Eliseev
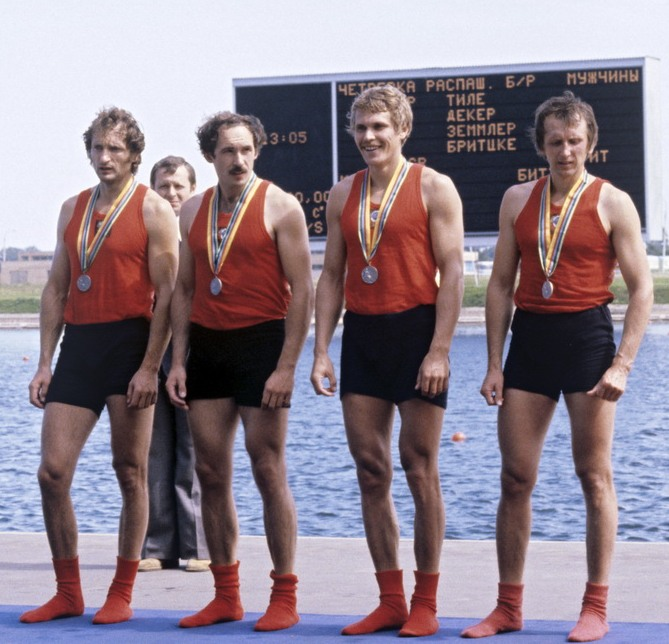
- Kamkin, Dolinin, Kulagin and Eliseyev at the 1980 Olympics

Personal information
- Born: 26 February 1950 (age 76) Ganja, Azerbaijan
- Height: 1.90 m (6 ft 3 in)
- Weight: 85 kg (187 lb)

Sport
- Sport: Rowing
- Club: Burevestnik Moscow
Medal record
Men's rowing
Representing the Soviet Union
Olympic Games
Silver medal – second place	1980 Moscow	Coxless four
World Rowing Championships
Gold medal – first place	1977 Amsterdam	Coxless pair
Gold medal – first place	1981 Münich	Coxless four
Silver medal – second place	1982 Lucerne	Coxless four

Vitali Mikhaylovich Eliseev (Russian: Виталий Михайлович Елисеев, born 26 February 1950) is a retired Russian rower who had his best achievements in the coxless fours, together with Valeriy Dolinin, Aleksandr Kulagin and Aleksey Kamkin. In this event they won a world title in 1981 and silver medals at the 1980 Summer Olympics and 1982 World Rowing Championships. Previously, Eliseev and Kulagin also won a world title in the coxless pairs in 1977.
