= Clive Roberts (rower) =

British rower

Personal information
- Full name: Clive G. Roberts
- Born: 19 March 1958 (age 68) Cape Town, South Africa
- Height: 193 cm (6 ft 4 in)
- Weight: 83 kg (183 lb)

Sport
- Sport: Rowing
Medal record
Men's rowing
Representing Great Britain
World Championships
Gold medal – first place	1978 Copenhagen	Lwt eight
Gold medal – first place	1980 Hazewinkel	Lwt eight

Clive G. Roberts (born 19 March 1958) is a British lightweight rower who has sailed for Great Britain in the America's Cup. He won a gold medal at the 1978 FISA Lightweight Championships in Copenhagen with the lightweight men's eight. Roberts also competed for Great Britain at the 1984 Summer Olympics.
