= Jaime Uriarte García =

Spanish rower

Sport
- Sport: Rowing
Medal record
Men's rowing
Representing Spain
World Rowing Championships
Gold medal – first place	1979 Bled	Lwt eight

Jaime Uriarte García is a Spanish lightweight rower. He won a gold medal at the 1979 World Rowing Championships in Bled with the lightweight men's eight.
