= Pär Hurtig =

Swedish rower

Personal information
- Full name: Pär Uno Hurtig
- Nationality: Swedish
- Born: 7 December 1957 (age 67); Gothenburg, Sweden

Sport
- Sport: Rowing

Pär Uno Hurtig (born 7 December 1957) is a Swedish rower. He competed in the men's coxless four event at the 1980 Summer Olympics.
