= Nicolas Lourdaux =

French rower

Personal information
- Nationality: French
- Born: 8 December 1955 (age 69)

Sport
- Sport: Rowing

Nicolas Lourdaux (born 8 December 1955) is a French rower. He competed in the men's coxless four event at the 1980 Summer Olympics.
