= Dominique Basset =

French rower

Personal information
- Nationality: French
- Born: 21 August 1957 (age 67)

Sport
- Sport: Rowing

Dominique Basset (born 21 August 1957) is a French rower. He competed in the men's coxless four event at the 1980 Summer Olympics.
