= Werner Lutz =

German rower

Sport
- Sport: Rowing
Medal record
Men's rowing
Representing East Germany
World Rowing Championships
Gold medal – first place	1979 Bled	Coxed four
World Rowing Junior Championships
Silver medal – second place	1981 Munich	Eight

Werner Lutz is a German rower.

At the 1974 World Junior Championships in Ratzeburg, Lutz won a silver medal with the men's eight. He won a gold medal at the 1979 World Rowing Championships in Bled with the men's coxed four. At the 1981 World Rowing Championships in Munich, he came fourth with the men's eight.
