= Peter Jansen (rower) =

New Zealand rower

Medal record

Men's rowing

Representing New Zealand

World Rowing Championships
Silver medal – second place	1979 Bled	Eight

Peter Jansen is a former New Zealand rower.

At the 1979 World Rowing Championships at Bled in Slovenia, Yugoslavia, he won a silver medal with the New Zealand eight in seat six. Jansen is a rowing coach at King's College in Auckland.
