= Jeff Sykes =

Australian rower (born 1943)

Personal information
- Born: 1943 (age 82–83)
- Years active: 1960 - 1978

Sport
- Sport: Rowing
- Club: Corio Bay Rowing Club
Medal record
Men's rowing
Representing Australia
World Rowing Championships
Bronze medal – third place	1978 Copenhagen	Lwt men's eight

Jeff Sykes (born 1943 in Victoria, Australia) is an Australian national champion lightweight rower and a builder of world-class rowing racing shells.

== Club and state rowing ==
Sykes commenced rowing in 1955 aged 12 as a coxswain at the Corio Bay Rowing Club. He's had a lifelong association with the club and has been club captain, committee man and Vice President.

Sykes' elite competitive rowing career spanned the period from 1960 to 1978. At the inaugural 1962 Australian Rowing Championships, Sykes became the national lightweight men's single scull champion wearing Corio Bay colours. He was then national lightweight men's single scull champion in 1964, 1968, and 1974 and placed second in 1975, 1976, and 1978.

Sykes' first state selection came in 1961 as Victoria's representative to contest the President's Cup - the Men's Interstate Sculling Championship - at the annual Interstate Regatta. He raced that event for Victoria in 1961, 1962, 1963, 1966, 1967, 1969, 1973 and 1976 and won that national title in 1966 and 1973. In 1968 and 1972 he was selected in the Victorian men's lightweight four who contested the Penrith Cup at the Interstate Regatta.

== International representative rowing ==
Sykes' debut national representative selection came in 1966 when he was selected as a Australia's sculler to race at the 1996 World Championships, however he withdrew due to business commitments. He raced on the world stage at the West German International Championships in 1973 and represented Australia at the 1973 European Rowing Championships in Moscow where he placed tenth in the men's single scull.

Sykes was a late addition to the lightweight men's eight at the 1978 FISA Lightweight Championships in Copenhagen, replacing Stuart Wilson who had not been in Australia long enough to be eligible. The Australian eight rowed to a bronze medal.

== Coaching ==
Before he had retired from competitive rowing, Sykes was coaching Leisa Patterson a Corio Bay Rowing Club sculler. She competed at the 1976 Australian Rowing Championships and won the Australian junior single sculls title. Then she contested the women's open single sculls title in 1977 (2nd place) and then won the lightweight single sculls title that same year. In 1978 she won both the lightweight and the open championship title. She continued to contest lightweight Australian sculls championships under Sykes' coaching for a number of year winning the lightweight single sculls title in 1979 and the lightweight double sculls title in 1991.

== Sykes racing shells ==
Sykes was apprenticed to his father's boat-building business in Geelong. In 1966, Sykes built his own racing shell to compete in the Australian Rowing Championships and this was the genesis of his own business Sykes Racing, a Geelong-based racing shell manufacturer. Sykes Racing initially focussed on smaller boats and had success as rowers of their sculls and pairs won Australian national championships. In 1973 the Western Australian senior men's eight had King's Cup success in a Sykes boat and from 1974 Sykes boats were being used in all boat classes for Australian representative crews.
