= Ortwin Rodewald =

East German rower

Sport
- Sport: Rowing
Medal record
Men's rowing
Representing East Germany
World Rowing Championships
Bronze medal – third place	1977 Amsterdam	Coxless pair
Gold medal – first place	Bled 1979	Eight

Ortwin Rodewald is a rower from East Germany who competed for the SG Dynamo Potsdam / Sportvereinigung (SV) Dynamo.

Rodewald won medals at World Rowing Championships. He went to the 1978 World Rowing Championships on Lake Karapiro in New Zealand as a reserve but did not compete.
