= Daniel Voiculescu =

Romanian rower

Personal information
- Nationality: Romanian
- Born: 17 October 1956 (age 68); Leu, Romania

Sport
- Sport: Rowing

Daniel Voiculescu (born 17 October 1956) is a Romanian rower. He competed in the men's coxless four event at the 1980 Summer Olympics.
