= Chris Drury (disambiguation) =

Chris Drury (born 1976) is a retired American professional ice hockey player.

Chris or Christopher Drury may also refer to:

- Chris Drury (artist) (born 1948), British environmental artist
- Christopher Drury (born 1952), British lightweight rower
