= Adam Babah-Alargi =

Ghanaian engineer (1927–2019)

Hajj Adam Babah-Alargi
- Born: 25 December 1927; Korle Gonno, Accra
- Died: 4 November 2019 (aged 91)
- Education: Hammersmith College
- Engineering career
- Discipline: Civil Engineering
- Employers: Bolten, Hennesy and Partners; OVE Aropp and Partners
- Projects: The presidential stand at the Black Star Square; The Vice Chancellor's Residence, the School of Architecture (Phases I and II), the Pharmacy Block and the Queen Elizabeth's Hall (Hall of residence) at the Kwame Nkrumah University of Science and Technology; Surgical, Maternity, and Children's wards at the Korle Bu Teaching Hospital

Hajj Adam Babah-Alargi (25 December 1927 – 4 November 2019) was a Ghanaian engineer who was responsible for many national projects in Ghana. He was the first Ghanaian to establish Ghana's first indigenous engineering consultancy. He was a founding member of the Accra West branch of the Rotary Club.

== Early life and education ==
Babah-Alargi was born on 25 December 1927 at Korle Gonno in Accra to Hausa parents. He studied structural engineering at Hammersmith College, London, England.

== Career ==
Babah-Alargi joined Bolten Hennesy and Partners in 1958 after his college education. Around that period, the company had been charged with projects in Ghana and these projects were at the Kwame Nkrumah University of Science and Technology. Hajj was put in charge for some of these projects namely; The Vice Chancellor's Residence, the School of Architecture (Phases I and II), the Pharmacy Block and Halls of residence specifically Queen Elizabeth's Hall, which was commissioned by the Queen when she visited Ghana in 1961. In 1960 he joined OVE Aropp and Partners (then the biggest foreign consulting firm in Ghana) as a director. There, his first project was to oversee the erection of the Presidential stand at the Black Star Square, a project that needed to be ready prior to the Queen's visit. From 1961 to 1964 he worked on the Korle Bu Teaching Hospital as the only Ghanaian engineer in the team. The project saw the building of the Surgical, Maternity, and Children's wards among others. In 1965 the then president Dr. Kwame Nkrumah engaged him to restructure the presidential stand at the Black Star Square as the president thought it was too high. The president however, was unable to use the stand which was to be due in early 1966 as a result of the overthrow of his government in early 1966. In 1967 he founded his own consultancy firm by the name of BAB Consultancy. The firm was the first indigenous consultancy established by a Ghanaian in his field of expertise. It was therefore the first indigenous engineering consultancy founded in Ghana. He worked on many projects in the following years and also served as a consultant for the Bank of Ghana, the National Investment Bank, and Messrs SKOA. He retired in 1987 and the business was handed over to his staff.

He together with ten others founded the Rotary Club of Accra-West. In 1987, the late Michael Asafo-Boakye, the then District Governor, appointed him as the District Governor's special representative to help form the Rotary Club in Osu-RE.

== Death ==
He died in November 2019 at the age of 91. His funeral was officiated by the National Chief Imam Sheikh Osmanu Nuhu Sharubutu. He was the oldest living rotarian in Ghana prior to his death.
