= José Rojí =

Spanish rower

Personal information
- Born: José Rojí Blanco

Sport
- Sport: Rowing
Medal record
Men's rowing
Representing Spain
World Rowing Championships
Gold medal – first place	1983 Duisburg	Lwt eight
Silver medal – second place	1977 Amsterdam	Lwt eight
Bronze medal – third place	1980 Hazewinkel	Lwt eight

José Rojí Blanco is a Spanish coxswain. He won a gold medal at the 1983 World Rowing Championships in Duisburg with the lightweight men's eight.
