= Mirosław Jarzembowski =

Polish rower

Personal information
- Full name: Mirosław Zenon Jarzembowski
- Nationality: Polish
- Born: 20 February 1954 (age 71); Bydgoszcz, Poland

Sport
- Sport: Rowing

Mirosław Zenon Jarzembowski (born 20 February 1954) is a Polish rower. He competed in the men's coxless four event at the 1980 Summer Olympics.
