= Sophie Hosking =

British rower

Personal information
- Full name: Sophie Hannah Marguerite Hosking
- Nationality: British
- Born: 25 January 1986 (age 40)
Medal record
Women's rowing
Representing Great Britain
Olympic Games
Gold medal – first place	2012 London	Lwt double sculls
World Championships
Silver medal – second place	2007 Munich	LW4x
Bronze medal – third place	2006 Eton	LW4x
Bronze medal – third place	2009 Poznań	LW2x
Bronze medal – third place	2011 Bled	LW2x

Sophie Hannah Marguerite Hosking MBE (born 25 January 1986) is a retired British rower.

== Personal life ==
Hosking was born in 1986. The lightweight rower David Hosking is her father. As a teenager, she played as a midfielder for the youth team of Wimbledon Ladies. She attended Kingston Grammar School in London, before completing an undergraduate degree in Chemistry and Physics at Trevelyan College, Durham University, graduating in 2007. Following her retirement from competitive rowing, Hosking embarked on a new career as a solicitor and is now the UK Head of Legal at Benifex.

== Rowing career ==
She is a member of the London Rowing Club in Putney. A fixture in British lightweight sculling since 2007, Hosking won a surprise gold medal for Great Britain in the 2012 Olympics lightweight double sculls, along with Kat Copeland. Hosking and Copeland's success was the second of six gold medals won by Great Britain on the middle Saturday of the 2012 Games, on what became known in the United Kingdom as Super Saturday.

She was part of the British squad that topped the medal table at the 2011 World Rowing Championships in Bled, where she won a bronze medal as part of the lightweight double sculls with Hester Goodsell.

== Awards ==
Hosking was appointed Member of the Order of the British Empire (MBE) in the 2013 New Year Honours for services to rowing.

== See also ==
- 2012 Olympics gold post boxes in the United Kingdom
