= Marek Niedziałkowski =

Polish rower

Personal information
- Nationality: Polish
- Born: 9 September 1952 (age 72); Gdańsk, Poland

Sport
- Sport: Rowing

Marek Niedziałkowski (born 9 September 1952) is a Polish rower. He competed in the men's coxless four event at the 1980 Summer Olympics.
