= Jürgen Thiele =

East German rower

Olympic medal record

Men's rowing

Representing East Germany

Olympic Games
Gold medal – first place	1980 Moscow	Coxless four

Friendship Games
Silver medal – second place	1984 Moscow	Eight

Jürgen Thiele (born 8 August 1959) is a German rower who competed for East Germany in the 1980 Summer Olympics.

He was born in Altenburg.

In 1980 he won the gold medal as crew member of the East German boat in the coxless fours competition.
