= Mussabini Medal =

- Description: Recognising coaches of UK performers who achieved outstanding success on the world stage
- Location: United Kingdom
- Country: United Kingdom
- Presented by: UK Coaching
- Reward: Medal
- Status: Discontinued
- First award: 1998
- Final award: 2007

The Mussabini Medal was a sports award recognising the coaches of British sports people and teams, named after Sam Mussabini. Mussabini, who died in 1927, is considered to be the first professional (paid) coach in sport, breaking the occupation's amateur (voluntary) public school roots. Introduced in 1998, it was awarded annually as part of the UK Coaching Awards organised by sports coach UK (the National Coaching Foundation) until 2007, when the 2008 awards categories onwards were renamed and expanded as part of the launch of the UK Coaching Framework.

== History and significance ==
The Mussabini Medal celebrated "the contribution of coaches of UK performers who have achieved outstanding success on the world stage." Along with the Mussabini Medal, there also existed The Dyson Award, for "individuals who have made a sustained and significant contribution to the development and management of coaching and individual coaches in the UK". This award was named after Geoff Dyson, the first chief national athletics coach, who died in 1981.

The Mussabini Medal was introduced in conjunction with the launch of the Coaching Hall of Fame. The medal and associated awards were launched to raise the profile of coaches, and increase the financial backing to enhance the profession, still seen at the time as a largely amateur vocation in spite of Mussabini's pioneering example. Speaking at the inaugural presentation the patron of the Foundation the Princess Royal stated that "Coaching and the work of individual coaches lies at the heart of sport, Yet all too often the role and contribution of the coach remains unrecognised and unacknowledged".

The Mussabini Medal was awarded to solely British coaches in the first two years, with 2000 being the first time foreign coaches of British athletes were recognised.

== Winners ==
Year	Mussabini Medal winners	Dyson Award winners	Ref
2007	Ian Armiger – Director of Swimming, Loughborough University; Billy Graham – Boxing Coach (Ricky Hatton)	Kevin Bowring – Head of Elite Coach Development, Rugby Union; Susan Woodhouse – Squash Coach	
2006	John Griffiths – Dragon Boat Racing; Gill Watson – Equestrian; Amanda Kirby – Gymnastics; Chris Gowers – Sailing	David Clarke – Archery; Anne Baker – Hockey	
2005	Troy Cooley, England Fast Bowling Coach – Cricket; Yogi Breisner, British Eventing Team Performance Manager – Equestrian; Kenneth Clawson, British Eventing Team Show Jumping Coach – Equestrian; Tracie Robinson, British Eventing Team Dressage Coach – Equestrian; Mike Ruddock – Welsh Rugby Union Coach; Ron Needs – Amateur Rowing Association Coach; Christine Still – Director of Coaching for Scottish Gymnastics	Bobbie Trafford – Coach Developer; Penny Crisfield – Coach Educator; Gordon Lord – Coach Educator, Cricket	
2004	Terry Edwards – Boxing; Eric Farrell – Canoeing; Duncan Fletcher – Cricket; Jurg Gotz – Canoeing; Simon Jones – Cycling; Steve Perks – Athletics; Paul Thompson – Rowing; Malcolm Willstrop – Squash	Derek Allison – Orienteering	
2003	Terry Denison – Swimming; Lyndon Lynch – Football; Jane Goldsmith – Equestrian; George Gandy – Athletics; Colin Hood – Paralympic Swimming	David Shaw – Rugby; Lloyd Readhead – Gymnastics	
2002	John Anderson – Athletics; Mike Hay – Curling; Russell Keiller – Curling; Wilf Paish – Athletics	John Jacobs – Golf; Doug Dailey – Cycling; Penny Chuter – Rowing; Jenny Bott – Gymnastics; Adrian Stan – Gymnastics; Ray Williams – Rugby Union	
2001	Alan Edge – Canoeing; Roland Lawler – Canoeing; Ron Roddan – Athletics; Rosemary and Alex Stanton – Athletics	Tom McNab – Athletics; Micky Stewart – Cricket; Chalkie White – Rugby Union; Craig Brown – Football; Howard Wilkinson – Football; Heather Crouch – Netball; Rex Hazeldine – Coach; Rod Thorpe – Coach Educator	
2000	Jenni Banks – Paralympic Athletics; David Pearson – Squash; Neil Harvey – Squash; Ray Knight – Paralympic Athletics; Peter Stanley & Norman Anderson – Athletics; Charles van Commenee – Athletics; Jan Bártů & Istvan Nemeth – Modern Pentathlon; Tony Burns – Boxing; Ian Coley – Double Trap Shooting; Mark Littlejohn – Sailing; John Derbyshire – Sailing; Dave Howlett – Sailing; Martin McElroy – Rowing; Jurgen Grobler – Rowing	Anne Pankhurst – Tennis; Ann Cutcliffe – Paralympic Dressage; Clive Durran – Paralympic Swimming; David Tillotson – British Paralympic Association; Rod Carr – Sailing; Peter Keen – Cycling; David Tanner – Rowing	
1999	Billy Cusack – Judo; Jim Telfer & Ian McGeechan – Rugby Union; Malcolm Arnold – Athletics; Peter Keen – Cycling; Sir Alex Ferguson – Football; Steve Pullen – Judo	John Atkinson – Gymnastics; Geoff Good – Canoeing; Maeve Kyle – Athletics; Tom Cartwright – Cricket; Sir Walter Winterbottom – Football; Don Rutherford – Rugby Union	
1998	Ron Pickering – Athletics; Sir Alf Ramsey – Football; Peggy Potts – Hockey; Kevin Hickey – Boxing; David Whitaker – Hockey; Mike Spracklen – Rowing	Allen Wade – Football; Betty Galsworthy – Netball; Betty Callaway – Ice Skating; Helen Elkington – Swimming; Jim Greenwood – Rugby Union; Frank Dick – Athletics	

== See also ==
- List of sport awards
- Sport in the United Kingdom
- UK Sport (public body)
