= Peter Keen (cyclist) =

British cyclist, coach and performance director

Peter Keen CBE (born 1964) is a former cyclist, coach, and now performance director.

Keen was born in High Wycombe, Buckinghamshire. In 1980 he won the schoolboy 10-mile time-trial championships. That led selection by the British Cycling Federation for the national track squad, despite having no track experience. Keen was educated at John Hampden Grammar School, before completing a sports studies degree at University College Chichester, where he began studying human performance from an academic perspective. He went on to complete a Master of Philosophy degree in Exercise Physiology at Loughborough University, and devised a research programme on the physical limitations to pursuit racing. He wrote to British Cycling asking if they wanted to get involved in the trials. They agreed to send some junior riders. Simultaneously, Keen was working as a senior lecturer in exercise physiology at University College Chichester and the University of Brighton.

He was UK national track cycling coach from 1989 to 1992 and was Chris Boardman’s coach when he became Olympic champion in the individual pursuit at the 1992 Summer Olympics, Britain's first Olympic gold medal in cycling for 72 years. Keen continued to work with Boardman as he started his professional career on to the continent where Boardman would win the prologue at the Tour de France three times and broke the world hour record three times. Other riders he coached include Yvonne McGregor, who he guided to Olympic and World Championship medals as well as the world hour record, Caroline Alexander, who won a European Mountain Bike title, and Marie Purvis, who he coached to the British hour record.

From 1997 to 2004 Keen was the elite performance director of British Cycling. In 1999 he was awarded the Mussabini Medal. He was awarded an honorary MSc by the University of Chichester in 2001. He was performance director for UK Sport prior to the 2012 London Olympics. At UK Sport as Performance Director Keen was responsible for developing and implementing ‘Mission 2012’ a strategic performance management system and reporting process for Olympic and Paralympic sports in the run-up to the 2012 Olympic Games in London. ‘Mission 2012’ was adopted in preparation for Sochi 2014 and the Rio Olympics in 2016. In June 2012, Keen became a Commander of the Order of the British Empire (CBE).

Keen worked as an interim performance director at the Lawn Tennis Association, having been appointed in October 2015 and remaining in post for the duration of his 12-month contract.

From 2013 has been director of sport advancement at Loughborough University.
