= Christian-Georg Warlich =

German rower

Personal information
- Born: 4 October 1957 (age 68) Germany
- Height: 184
- Weight: 75

Sport
- Sport: Rowing
- Club: Blankenstein RV
Medal record
Men's rowing
Representing West Germany
World Championships
Gold medal – first place	1980 Hazewinkel	LM1x

Christian-Georg Warlich (born 4 October 1957) is a retired lightweight rower who competed for West Germany. In the lightweight men's single sculls, he was German champion on seven occasions (1978 to 1980 and 1984 to 1987). He became world champion in this boat class at the 1980 World Rowing Championships. He rows for Blankenstein RV (Ruderverein).
