= Ian McNuff =

British rower (born 1957)

Personal information
- Nationality: English
- Born: 10 March 1957 (age 69) Ealing

Sport
- Club: London RC
Medal record
Men's rowing
Representing Great Britain
Bronze medal – third place	1980 Moscow	Coxless four
World Championships
Bronze medal – third place	1978 Karapiro	Coxless four
Bronze medal – third place	1979 Bled	Coxless four

Ian T. McNuff (born 10 March 1957 in Ealing) is a British rower who competed in the 1980 Summer Olympics.

== Rowing career ==
In 1975, McNuff along with John Beattie, Robin Roberts and Martin Cross was a crew member of the Ealing High Schools coxless fours boat coached by their History Teacher David Tanner (later Sir David Tanner CBE) which won the silver medal at the World Junior Rowing Championships for Great Britain in Montreal behind East Germany and in front of West Germany. The following year he was part of the coxless four that finished 10th overall after a fourth-place finish in the B final at the 1977 World Rowing Championships in Amsterdam.

In 1978 along with John Beattie, David Townsend and Martin Cross he was a member of the British coxless four boat (coached by Tanner) which won the bronze medal in the 1978 World Rowing Championships at Karipiro, New Zealand behind Russia and East Germany. The following year in 1979 he was a member of the British coxless four boat (again with Beattie, Townsend and Cross and coached by Tanner) which won the bronze medal in the 1979 World Rowing Championships at Bled, Yugoslavia behind East Germany and Czechoslovakia.

In the 1980 Moscow Olympics John Beattie, David Townsend and Martin Cross he was a crew member of the British boat which won the bronze medal in the Olympic coxless fours event behind East Germany and Russia. Coached by David Tanner

== Personal life ==
He is married to fellow GB rower Sue Handscomb.
