= John Beattie (rower) =

British rower

Personal information
- Nationality: English
- Born: 9 April 1957 (age 69) Ealing, London

Sport
- Club: London RC
Medal record
Men's rowing
Representing Great Britain
Bronze medal – third place	1980 Moscow	Coxless four
World Championships
Bronze medal – third place	1978 Karapiro	Coxless four
Bronze medal – third place	1979 Bled	Coxless four

John M. Beattie (born 9 April 1957) is a British rower who competed in the 1980 Summer Olympics and in the 1984 Summer Olympics.

== Rowing career ==
In 1975, Beattie along with Ian McNuff, Robin Roberts and Martin Cross was a crew member of the Ealing High Schools coxless fours boat coached by their History Teacher David Tanner (later Sir David Tanner CBE) which won the silver medal at the World Junior Rowing Championships for Great Britain in Montreal behind East Germany and in front of West Germany. The following year he was part of the coxless four that finished 10th overall after a fourth-place finish in the B final at the 1977 World Rowing Championships in Amsterdam.

In 1978, along with McNuff, David Townsend and Martin Cross he was a member of the British coxless four boat (coached by Tanner) which won the bronze medal in the 1978 World Rowing Championships at Karipiro, New Zealand behind Russia and East Germany. The following year in 1979 he was a member of the British coxless four boat (again with McNuff, Townsend and Cross and coached by Tanner) which won the bronze medal in the 1979 World Rowing Championships at Bled, Yugoslavia behind East Germany and Czechoslovakia.

In the 1980 Moscow Olympics Ian McNuff, David Townsend and Martin Cross he was a crew member of the British boat which won the bronze medal in the Olympic coxless fours event behind East Germany and Russia. Coached by David Tanner.

Four years later he and his partner Richard Stanhope finished twelfth in the 1984 coxless pairs competition.
