= Nigel Read =

British rower

Sport
- Sport: Rowing
- Club: London RC
Medal record
Men's rowing
Representing Great Britain
World Rowing Championships
| Gold medal – first place | 1977 Amsterdam | Lwt eight |
| Gold medal – first place | 1978 Copenhagen | Lwt eight |
| Gold medal – first place | 1980 Hazewinkel | Lwt eight |
| Silver medal – second place | 1976 Villach | Lwt eight |
| Bronze medal – third place | 1975 Nottingham | Lwt eight |

Nigel Read is a retired lightweight rower who competed for Great Britain.

== Rowing career ==
Read was part of the lightweight eight that secured a bronze medal at the 1975 World Rowing Championships. The following year he was part of the lightweight eight that secured a silver medal at the 1976 World Rowing Championships in Villach, Austria. He won a gold medal at the 1977 World Rowing Championships in Amsterdam with the lightweight men's eight. The following year he was part of the lightweight eight that successfully defended their title and won the gold medal at the 1978 FISA Lightweight Championships in Copenhagen. He regained the title and gold medal at the World Championships in Hazewinkel, August 1980
