= Jan Nicklasson =

Swedish rower

Personal information
- Nationality: Swedish
- Born: 19 April 1954 (age 70); Gothenburg, Sweden

Sport
- Sport: Rowing

Jan Nicklasson (born 19 April 1954) is a Swedish rower. He competed in the men's coxless four event at the 1980 Summer Olympics.
