= John Melvin (rower) =

British lightweight rower

Sport
- Sport: Rowing
Medal record
Men's rowing
Representing Great Britain
World Championships
Gold medal – first place	1978 Copenhagen	Lwt eight
Silver medal – second place	1983 Duisburg	Lwt single scull

John Melvin is a British lightweight rower. He won a gold medal at the 1978 FISA Lightweight Championships in Copenhagen with the lightweight men's eight.
