= Colin Barratt =

British rower (born 1948)

Personal information
- Born: 21 December 1948 (age 77)

Sport
- Sport: Rowing
Medal record
Men's rowing
Representing Great Britain
World Championships
Gold medal – first place	1979 Bled	Lwt men's four
Gold medal – first place	1980 Hazewinkel	Lwt men's eight

Colin Barratt (born 21 December 1948) is a British lightweight rower. He won a gold medal at the 1979 World Rowing Championships in Bled with the lightweight men's four, and at the 1980 World Rowing Championships in Hazewinkel with the lightweight men's eight.

Barratt rowed for Durham University Boat Club.
