= Antonio Elizalde =

Spanish lightweight rower

Antonio Elizalde Aldabaldetrecu
Sport
- Sport: Rowing
Medal record
Men's rowing
Representing Spain
World Rowing Championships
Silver medal – second place	1977 Amsterdam	Lwt eight
Gold medal – first place	1979 Bled	Lwt eight
Bronze medal – third place	1982 Lucerne	Lwt eight

Antonio Elizalde Aldabaldetrecu is a Spanish lightweight rower. He won a gold medal at the 1979 World Rowing Championships in Bled with the lightweight men's eight.
