= Sykes Racing =

- Founded: Melbourne, Australia (1966)
- Founder: Jeff Sykes
- Products: Rowing boats
- Website: www.sykes.com.au

Sykes Racing is an Australian manufacturer of rowing shells. The boats are widely popular by Australian rowers from schools through to Olympians.

== History ==
The company was founded in Geelong, Victoria, in 1966 by the Australian champion lightweight rower Jeff Sykes. Sykes saw the need for innovation in the Australian boat-building industry and set out to build world-class boats.

Sykes had been apprenticed to his father's boat-building business in Geelong. In 1966, Sykes built his own racing shell to compete in the Australian Rowing Championships and this was the genesis of Sykes Racing. Sykes Racing initially focussed on smaller boats and had success as rowers of their sculls and pairs won Australian national championships. In 1973 the Western Australian senior men's eight had King's Cup success in a Sykes boat and from 1974 Sykes boats were being used in all boat classes for Australian representative crews.

The company's products are suitable for novice rowers through to world-class, elite athletes. The company has developed a reputation for developing high-class racing sculls. Since 1992, 75% of Australia's rowing medals from World Championships and Olympic Games have come from rowers using Sykes Racing shells. Sykes' first boat is still in existence today.

Sykes established a separate entity, Sykes Advanced Manufacturing (SAM) in 2025. That year SAM acquired a site and assets formerly belonging to aerospace composites company Quickstep's R&D division. The site at Deakin University's Waurn Ponds campus now carries out SAM's research and development. According to an interview with Sykes Managing Director Mark Nothnagel in July 2026, Sykes has undertaken eight months' development work on large-format additive manufacturing and has plans to diversify into sectors including modular housing.

== Types of boats ==
Sykes Racing uses three different composite materials, which include Honeycomb Carbon Composite Boats, Honeycomb Kevlar Boats, Honeycomb Glass Boats. These different materials are used in the eight boat types they produce, which are:

- Single Sculls (1X)
- Pairs - Coxless (2-)
- Double Sculls (2X)
- Fours - Coxless (4-)
- Fours - Coxed (4+)
- Quad Sculls - Coxless (4X)
- Quad Sculls - Coxed (4X+)
- Eights (8+)
