= Jiří Prudil =

Czech rower

Personal information
- Nationality: Czech
- Born: 28 June 1957 (age 67); Brno, Czechoslovakia

Sport
- Sport: Rowing

Jiří Prudil (born 28 June 1957) is a Czech rower. He competed in the men's coxless four event at the 1980 Summer Olympics.
