= Stephen Simpole =

British rower

Personal information
- Born: Second quarter 1955 London

Sport
- Sport: Rowing
- Club: London RC
Medal record
Men's rowing
Representing Great Britain
World Rowing Championships
Gold medal – first place	1977 Amsterdam	Lwt eight
Gold medal – first place	1978 Copenhagen	Lwt eight
Gold medal – first place	1980 Hazewinkel	Lwt eight
Bronze medal – third place	1975 Nottingham	Lwt eight

Stephen A Simpole (born 1955) is a retired lightweight rower who competed for Great Britain.

== Rowing career ==
Simpole was part of the lightweight eight that secured a bronze medal at the 1975 World Rowing Championships. He won a gold medal at the 1977 World Rowing Championships in Amsterdam with the lightweight men's eight. The following year he was part of the lightweight eight that successfully defended their title and won the gold medal at the 1978 FISA Lightweight Championships in Copenhagen.
