= Hans-Konrad Trümpler =

Swiss rower

Medal record

Men's rowing

Representing Switzerland

World Rowing Championships
| Gold medal – first place | 1982 Lucerne | M4- |
| Silver medal – second place | 1981 Munich | M4- |
| Bronze medal – third place | 1979 Bled | M2- |

Hans-Konrad Trümpler (born 15 August 1960) is a Swiss rower. He won the gold medal in the coxless four at the 1982 World Rowing Championships.
