= Andreas Nicklasson =

Swedish footballer

Personal information
- Date of birth: 22 April 1978
- Height: 1.85 m (6 ft 1 in)
- Position: Midfielder

Senior career*
| Years | Team | Apps | (Gls) |
| 1998–2004 | IF Elfsborg | | |
| 2002 | → Västra Frölunda IF | | |
| 2003 | → Jönköpings Södra IF | | |
- * Club domestic league appearances and goals

Andreas Nicklasson (born 22 April 1978) is a Swedish retired football midfielder.
