= André Cusaco =

Irish colonial administrator

Andrew Cusack (fl. late 17th century) also known as André Cusaco, was an Irish colonial administrator and military officer at the service of Portugal. He was appointed governor of Rio de Janeiro on 29 August 1694, replacing the prior holder of the office, António Pais de Sande, who had suffered a stroke. He left office sometime after 2 July 1697.

He was a mestre de campo of the Old Terço of Bahia (Terço Velho da Bahia).
