= Christine Röpke =

German rower

Sport
- Sport: Rowing
- Club: SC Dynamo Berlin
Medal record
Women's rowing
Representing East Germany
World Rowing Championships
| Gold medal – first place | 1979 Bled | Coxed quad sculls |

Christine Röpke is a rower who competed for East Germany during the 1970s.

At a 1977 spring regatta on the Grünau regatta course, Röpke won in the single scull. Two months later at the East German national championships, she competed in the double scull and came third. At the 1978 East German national championships, she competed in single scull and came third. Röpke travelled as a reserve to the 1978 World Rowing Championships in New Zealand but did not compete. At the 1979 East German national championships, she won with the coxed quad scull. The same team went to the 1979 World Rowing Championships at Bled in Yugoslavia where they became world champions. In January 1980, she was given two sports awards: Master of Sport and Honoured Master of Sports.
