= Michael Raduner =

Swiss rower

Personal information
- Born: 1 July 1958 (age 67)

Sport
- Sport: Rowing
Medal record
Men's rowing
Representing Switzerland
World Rowing Championships
| Gold medal – first place | 1978 Copenhagen | Lwt men's four |

Michael Raduner (born 1 July 1958) is a Swiss lightweight rower. He won a gold medal at the 1978 World Rowing Championships in Copenhagen with the lightweight men's four.
