= Jorge Álvarez (rower) =

Cuban rower (born 1959)

Personal information
- Full name: Jorge Luis Álvarez Galvez
- Nationality: Cuban
- Born: 5 April 1959 (age 67)

Sport
- Sport: Rowing
Medal record
Men's rowing
Representing Cuba
Pan American Games
Bronze medal – third place	1979 San Juan	Eight

Jorge Luis Álvarez Galvez (born 5 April 1959) is a Cuban rower. He competed in two events at the 1980 Summer Olympics.
