= Henryk Trzciński =

Polish rower

Personal information
- Full name: Henryk Dominik Trzciński
- Nationality: Polish
- Born: 28 April 1954 (age 70); Ostróda, Poland

Sport
- Sport: Rowing

Henryk Dominik Trzciński (born 28 April 1954) is a Polish rower. He competed in the men's coxless four event at the 1980 Summer Olympics.
