= Bob Cooper (rower) =

Australian rower

Robert Cooper
Personal information
- Nationality: Australian

Sport
- Country: Australia
- Sport: Rowing
- Club: Torrens Rowing Club

Achievements and titles
- National finals: Penrith Cup 1965-74
Medal record
Representing Australia
World Rowing Championships
Bronze medal – third place	1978 Copenhagen	LM8+

Bob Cooper is an Australian former lightweight rower. He was an Australian national champion and won a bronze medal at the 1978 World Rowing Championships.

== Club and state rowing ==
Raised in Adelaide, Cooper's senior rowing was from the Torrens Rowing Club.

State representation first came for Cooper in 1965 in the South Australian lightweight four contesting the Penrith Cup at the Interstate Regatta within the Australian Rowing Championships. He rowed in further South Australian Penrith Cup crews in 1966, 1967, 1969, 1970, 1971, 1972, 1974, stroking the 1974 South Australian four. His 1970 crew was victorious breaking the long stranglehold held by Victoria and New South Wales in this event.

In 1966 Cooper rowed in a composite South Australian eight contesting the lightweight eight title at the Australian Championships. In 1968 and again in 1974 in Torrens colours and rowing with Vaughan Bollen, Cooper won the national lightweight coxless pair title at the Australian Rowing Championships.

== International representative rowing ==
Cooper made his sole Australian representative appearance at the 1978 World Rowing Championships in Copenhagen in the Australian men's lightweight eight. That crew won a bronze medal.

== Current life ==
Robert Cooper is now a rowing coach at The Southport School, located on the Gold Coast and predominantly coaches eights. He is currently coaching the TSS Yr 11 1st VIII, rowing in the Jeremy King. The crew is as follows: Macdonald Chandler, Lachlan Frith, Tom Houlahan, Mason King, Toby Goffsassen, Rory Sampson, Sidney Bradnam, George Milson and Cox Samuel Sweetland. Placing 2nd at the annual Head of the River, at Wyaralong Dam with a time of 5:53.49, the crew has been expertly coached by the prestigious Cooper. Mr Cooper fondly remembers his favourite coached crew thus far, the 2020 TSS Open 2nd VIII - crew: Max Cook, Isaac Whitsed, Alec Turnbull, Oscar Billson, Lewis Cole, Zac Rossiter, Tom Schwerkolt and Cox Cameron Vele. In the off season, he has coached many other boys, such as light weight sculler Henry Xiang, who placed first at the Head of the Tweed and Third at the annual GPS Head of the River for the Brisbane Grammar open 2nd VIII.
