= Peter Zeun =

British rower (born 1951)

Personal information
- Born: Fourth quarter 1951 Peterborough

Sport
- Sport: Rowing
- Club: Peterborough City RC
Medal record
Men's rowing
Representing Great Britain
World Rowing Championships
| Gold medal – first place | 1978 Copenhagen | Lwt eight |
| Gold medal – first place | 1980 Hazewinkel | Lwt eight |

Peter Werner Zeun (born 1951) is a British retired lightweight rower.

== Rowing career ==
Zeun was selected by Great Britain in the lightweight single sculls at the 1975 World Rowing Championships, he finished in 9th overall and 3rd in the B final. The following year he rowed at the 1976 World Rowing Championships in Villach, Austria again finishing 3rd in the B final. In 1977 he finished fourth in the B final at the 1977 World Rowing Championships in Amsterdam.

He won a gold medal at the 1978 FISA Lightweight Championships in Copenhagen with the lightweight men's eight.

He married Bronwen R. Simonds in 1981.
