= Pierre Zentner =

Swiss rower

Personal information
- Born: 13 March 1958 (age 68)

Sport
- Sport: Rowing
Medal record
Men's rowing
Representing Switzerland
World Rowing Championships
Gold medal – first place	1978 Copenhagen	Lwt men's four
Bronze medal – third place	1979 Bled	Lwt men's four

Pierre Zentner (born 13 March 1958) is a Swiss lightweight rower. He won a gold medal at the 1978 World Rowing Championships in Copenhagen with the lightweight men's four.
