= David Hosking (rower) =

British rower

Personal information
- Relatives: Sophie Hosking (daughter)

Sport
- Sport: Rowing
Medal record
Men's rowing
Representing Great Britain
World Championships
Gold medal – first place	1980 Hazewinkel	Lwt eight

David Hosking is a British lightweight rower. He won a gold medal at the 1980 World Rowing Championships in Hazewinkel with the lightweight men's eight.

Hosking studied at Durham University and joined the Royal Navy following graduation. He is the father of Sophie Hosking.

In 2011, he formed part of a team that broke the world record for rowing across the Atlantic Ocean.
