= Vaughan Bollen =

Australian former lightweight rower

Personal information
- Nationality: Australian
- Born: Adelaide, South Australia

Sport
- Country: Australia
- Sport: Rowing
- Club: Torrens Rowing Club

Achievements and titles
- National finals: King's Cup 1961-64; Penrith Cup 1967-79
Medal record
Representing Australia
World Rowing Championships
Bronze medal – third place	1978 Copenhagen	LM4-

Vaughan Bollen is an Australian former lightweight rower. He is from a prominent South Australian rowing family, was a seven-time Australian national champion and won a bronze medal at the 1978 World Rowing Championships. He competed over an eighteen-year period in events at the annual Interstate Regatta within the Australian Rowing Championships firstly as a South Australian King's Cup coxswain from 1961, then as a South Australian Presidents Cup rower from 1967 and finally till 1979, as a Victorian state representative President's Cup rower.

== Family, club and state rowing ==
Raised in Adelaide, Bollen's senior rowing was initially from the Torrens Rowing Club where his family had a rich history. Late in his career he rowed for two seasons at the Melbourne University Boat Club.

His father Jack was a competitive Torrens senior eight rower from the 1930s, had rowed in South Australian King's Cup crews from 1938 and was a senior clubman at war's end when South Australian rowing recommenced. As a club and King's Cup state coach and later club president, Jack Bollen helped the take up of SA rowing from 1946 and helped build Torrens into the prominent Adelaide Club in the first post-bellum decade. Jack had rowed with his brother Eric at Torrens. Eric was the Torren's club captain in 1947–48. Their mother, Vaughan's grandmother had a long involvement with the club from 1931 till her 1946 death.

State representation first came for Vaughan Bollen in 1961 as the coxswain of the South Australian men's eight contesting the King's Cup at the Interstate Regatta. That crew was coached by his father Jack. In 1962, 1963 and 1964 he again coxed the South Australian King's Cup eight.

In 1967 he was selected as a South Australian rower and he stroked the state lightweight four contesting the Penrith Cup at the Interstate Regatta within the Australian Rowing Championships. He rowed in further South Australian Penrith Cup crews in 1968, 1969, 1970, 1971, 1972, 1974, 1975 and 1977. He stroked those South Australian fours in 1968, 1969, 1975 and 1977 His 1970 South Australian crew was victorious breaking the long stranglehold held by Victoria and New South Wales in this event.

By 1978 in his effort to make the Australian lightweight four Bollen had relocated to Victoria and he rowed in the Victorian crew which won the Penrith Cup in 1978 and went on to represent Australia at that year's world championships. In 1979 that same Victorian crew raced to a second place in the Penrith Cup behind another Victorian crew, when in that year up to three crews from each state were allowed to race.

In 1966 Bollen rowed in a composite South Australian eight contesting the lightweight eight title at the Australian Championships. In 1968 and again in 1974 in Torrens colours and rowing with Robert Cooper, Bollen won the national lightweight coxed pair title at the Australian Rowing Championships. During Australian representative campaign and his 1978 relocation to Victoria, he rowed in Melbourne University Boat Club colours at the Australian Championships. In MUBC crews he won the lightweight eight national title in 1978 and 1979 and the lightweight coxless four title in 1978.

== International representative rowing ==
Bollen made his sole Australian representative appearance at the 1978 World Rowing Championships in Copenhagen in the Australian men's lightweight coxless four. That four containing Peter Antonie, Simon Gillett, Geoffrey Rees with Bollen won a bronze medal.
