= Jutta Abromeit =

East German rower

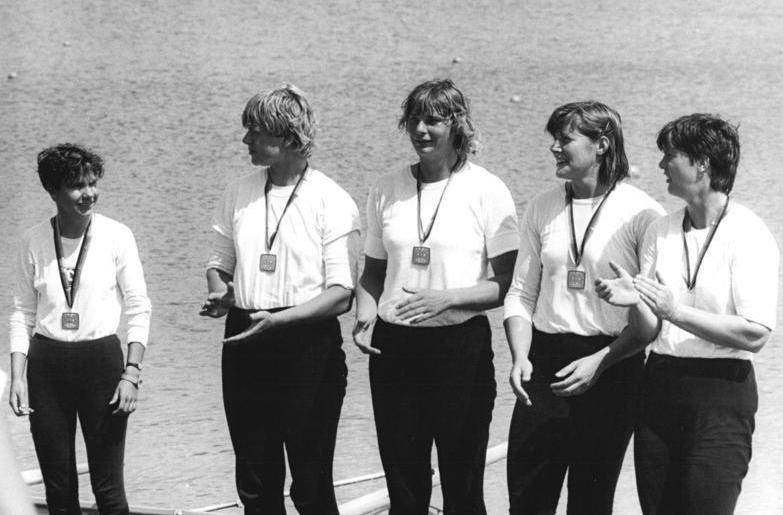
- Abromeit (middle) in 1985

Personal information
- Born: 17 September 1959 (age 66) Ludwigsfelde, Bezirk Potsdam, East Germany
- Height: 1.86 m (6 ft 1 in)
- Weight: 83 kg (183 lb)

Sport
- Sport: Rowing
- Club: DRSV Auswahl
Medal record
Representing East Germany
World Rowing Championships
Gold medal – first place	1985 Hazewinkel	Coxed four

Jutta Abromeit (née Raeck, born 17 September 1959) is a retired East German rower who won a world title in the coxed four in 1985, together with Kerstin Spittler, Carola Lichey, Steffi Götzelt and Daniela Neunast. In October 1986, she was awarded a Patriotic Order of Merit in gold (first class) for her sporting success.
