= Stefan Netzle =

Swiss rower

Medal record

Men's rowing

Representing Switzerland

World Rowing Championships
Gold medal – first place	1982 Lucerne	M4-
Silver medal – second place	1981 Munich	M4-
Bronze medal – third place	1979 Bled	M2-
Bronze medal – third place	1985 Hazewinkel	M2-

Stefan Netzle (born 31 December 1957) is a Swiss rower. He won the gold medal in the coxless four at the 1982 World Rowing Championships. Netzle is a lawyer and has been a judge at the Court of Arbitration for Sport from 1991 to 2010.
