= Mario Borroto =

- Catcher
- Born: Cuba

Negro league baseball debut
- 1920, for the Cuban Stars (East)

Last appearance
- 1921, for the Cuban Stars (East)

Teams
- Cuban Stars (East) (1920-1921)

Mario Borroto was a Cuban professional baseball catcher in the Negro leagues. He played with Cuban Stars (East) in 1920 and 1921.
