= 1980 World Rowing Championships =

International rowing event

- Venue: Hazewinkel
- Location: Heindonk, Willebroek, Belgium
- Dates: 16 August

The 1980 World Rowing Championships were World Rowing Championships that were held in August 1980 at Hazewinkel in Heindonk, Belgium. Since 1980 was an Olympic year for rowing, the World Championships did not include the 14 Olympic classes scheduled for the 1980 Summer Olympics. Only the four lightweight men's event formed part of the competition, and all finals were raced on 16 August.

== Medal summary ==
Medalists at the 1980 World Rowing Championships were:

=== Men's lightweight events ===
Event:	Gold:	Time	Silver:	Time	Bronze:	Time
LM1x	West Germany; Christian-Georg Warlich	07:00.94	United States; Bill Belden	07:06.32	Spain; José Antonio Montosa Ortega	07:08.80
LM2x	Italy; Francesco Esposito; Ruggero Verroca	06:29.18	United States; Scott Roop; Lawrence Klecatsky	06:31.10	Switzerland; Kurt Steiner; Reto Wyss	06:33.44
LM4-	Australia; Graham Gardiner; Charles Bartlett; Clyde Hefer; Simon Gillett	06:12.35	Denmark; Mogens Rasmussen Juul; Søren Christensen; Jan Christensen; Kim Hagsted	06:23.75	Great Britain; Antony Richardson; Andrew Cusack; Duncan Innes; Colin Cusack	06:25.76
LM8+	Great Britain; Colin Barratt; David Hosking; Robert Downie; Nicholas Howe; Peter Zeun; Clive Roberts; Nigel Read; Stephen Simpole; Simon Jefferies (cox)	05:42.76	France; Bernard Gronchi; Thierry Farelle; Bertrand Razat; Serge Grenier; Jean-François Razat; Gerard Avril; Maxime Mantovani; Laurent Fritsch; Bertrand Le Cossec (cox)	05:45.62	Spain; Felix Alonso Muñoz; Carlos Sáez Bernardos; José Marti Miranda; Francisco Goicoechea García; Luis Arteaga Leon; José Rojí; Angel Sáez Bernardos; Fernando Climent; Javier Sabriá (cox)	05:45.87
