= Luis Arteaga Leon =

Spanish lightweight rower

Sport
- Sport: Rowing
Medal record
Men's rowing
Representing Spain
World Rowing Championships
| Gold medal – first place | 1979 Bled | Lwt eight |
| Bronze medal – third place | 1980 Hazewinkel | Lwt eight |
| Bronze medal – third place | 1981 Munich | Lwt eight |

Luis Arteaga Leon is a Spanish lightweight rower. He won a gold medal at the 1979 World Rowing Championships in Bled with the lightweight men's eight.
