= Stephanie Price (rower) =

British rower

Personal information
- Nationality: British
- Born: 24 August 1953 (age 71); Bristol

Sport
- Sport: Rowing
- Club: Bristol Ariel RC; Thames RC

Stephanie Price (born 1953) is a retired British rower who competed for Great Britain.

== Rowing career ==
Price was part of the coxed quad scull that finished 10th overall and fourth in the B final at the 1977 World Rowing Championships in Amsterdam.

She later competed at the 1979 World Rowing Championships and 1985 World Rowing Championships.
