= Thomas von Weissenfluh =

Swiss rower

Personal information
- Born: 8 March 1951 (age 75)

Sport
- Sport: Rowing
Medal record
Men's rowing
Representing Switzerland
World Rowing Championships
Gold medal – first place	1978 Copenhagen	Lwt men's four
Bronze medal – third place	1979 Bled	Lwt men's four

Thomas von Weissenfluh (born 8 March 1951) is a Swiss lightweight rower. He won a gold medal at the 1978 World Rowing Championships in Copenhagen with the lightweight men's four.

He obtained a PhD from ETH Zurich in 1984 with a thesis on turbulent heat transport in liquid sodium.
