= Adrian Maginn =

Australian rowing cox and coach

Personal information
- Born: 1953 (age 72–73)
- Years active: 1967-78

Sport
- Country: Australia
- Sport: Rowing
- Club: Mercantile Rowing Club; Melbourne Uni Boat Club
Medal record
Men's rowing
Representing Australia
World Rowing Championships
Bronze medal – third place	1978 Copenhagen	LM8+

Adrian Maginn (born 1953 in Melbourne) is an Australian former rowing coxswain and rowing coach. He was a five-time national champion and won a bronze medal at the 1978 World Rowing Championships.

== Club and state rowing ==
Maginn's rowing association with the Mercantile Rowing Club started as a thirteen year old in 1967 before he took up coxing at school. He then coxed the St Kevin's College, Melbourne first VIII for three consecutive years from 1968 to 1970.

As a seventeen year old in his first year out of school Maginn took up the ropes of the 1971 Victorian senior men's eight contesting the King's Cup at the 1971 Interstate Regatta within the Australian Rowing Championships. That crew came home over South Australia in the final 500m and Maginn won his first Australian Championship title - a King's Cup victory. Maginn steered other Victorian eights contesting the King's Cup in 1972, 1973 and 1977 to places but no victories.

In 1970 and 1974 he competed at the Australian Rowing Championships in Mercantile men's junior eights. The 1974 eight won that championship title. In 1975 in Mercantile colours he won a national championship in the stern of a second-grade eight. 1976 saw him in a composite Monash/MUBC coxed four which competed at the Australian Championships and he coxed another Monash/MUBC four to a second place in 1977.

In 1977 Maginn moved to the Melbourne University Boat Club and to an involvement in their lightweight program. He was in the stern of the 1978 MUBC lightweight eight which won the national championship that year and was selected to cox the Victorian state lightweight four which won in that last year when the interstate lightweight title was contested in a coxed boat. In 1979 he coxed a Mercantile/MUBC lightweight eight to second place in their national title attempt at the Australian Rowing Championships.

== International representative rowing ==
Maginn made his sole Australian representative appearance at the 1978 World Rowing Championships - a lightweight only championships - in Copenhagen. He steered the Australian lightweight eight to a bronze medal.

== Coaching career ==
Maginn carried on coaching at the MUBC after his coxing career ceased. He coached the 1980 MUBC eight to victory at the 1980 Intervarsity Championships in Canberra. In 1981 he coached the Victorian state youth eight which contested the Noel Wilkinson Trophy at the 1981 Interstate Regatta.

He has had a long association with Masters rowing at the Melbourne University Boat Club.
