= Wenceslao Borroto =

Cuban rower (born 1958)

Personal information
- Full name: Wenceslao Borroto Torres
- Nationality: Cuban
- Born: 20 May 1958 (age 68)

Sport
- Sport: Rowing
Medal record
Men's rowing
Representing Cuba
Pan American Games
Gold medal – first place	1979 San Juan	Coxless four

Wenceslao Borroto Torres (born 20 May 1958) is a Cuban rower. He competed in two events at the 1980 Summer Olympics.
