= David Tanner (rowing executive) =

Sir David Whitlock Tanner
- Born: 29 December 1947 (age 77)

Sir David Whitlock Tanner CBE (born 29 December 1947 in London) was the performance director for the British Rowing Team until February 2018. He has assisted the team to Olympic success from the 1984 Los Angeles games to the 2016 Rio games. This success has been paralleled by success in the World Rowing Championships.

== Career ==
He was educated at Abingdon School where he gained rowing colours for the Abingdon School Boat Club. Tanner's first career was as a teacher. He followed this at the same time involving himself deeply with rowing. He first achieved a place in the vanguard of British rowing when he coached a team of 4 inexperienced boys from Ealing Grammar School and took them through to medal success in the World Championships and to a bronze medal in the 1980 Summer Olympics in Moscow.

Tanner was deputy headmaster at Greenford High School in Ealing from 1986 to 1987 before he took a post as headmaster at the former Longford School in Feltham, Middlesex from 1987 to 1996.

In 1992 he was appointed team leader to GB rowing for the Olympic games of that year. Following the 1996 Olympic games Tanner was appointed, with the support of lottery funding, a full-time position of Performance Director to GB rowing.

2002 saw the introduction of Tanner’s initiative to find new rowers. Called “Start” it recruited half of the 10 Olympic champion rowers in the 2012 games.

He announced on 15 December 2017 that he would be standing down from his post of Performance Director at the end of February 2018.

He is a long-time governor of Shiplake College and became Chair of the Board in December 2020.

== Awards ==
- – 1992 appointed a Fellow of the Royal Society of Arts
- – 2000 awarded the Dyson Award for coaching
- – 2003 appointed an OBE
- – 2009 appointed a CBE
- – 2012 granted Freedom of the City of London
- – 2013 appointed a Knight Bachelor for services to rowing
- – 2013 granted Freedom of the Company of Watermen

== See also ==
- List of Old Abingdonians
