= List of Olympic medalists in rowing (women) =

This is the complete list of women's Olympic medalists in rowing.

== Current program ==
=== Single sculls ===
Games	Gold	Silver	Bronze
1976 Montreal	Christine Scheiblich; East Germany	Joan Lind; United States	Yelena Antonova; Soviet Union
1980 Moscow	Sanda Toma; Romania	Antonina Zelikovich; Soviet Union	Martina Schröter; East Germany
1984 Los Angeles	Valeria Răcilă; Romania	Charlotte Geer; United States	Ann Haesebrouck; Belgium
1988 Seoul	Jutta Behrendt; East Germany	Anne Marden; United States	Magdalena Georgieva; Bulgaria
1992 Barcelona	Elisabeta Lipă; Romania	Annelies Bredael; Belgium	Silken Laumann; Canada
1996 Atlanta	Ekaterina Karsten; Belarus	Silken Laumann; Canada	Trine Hansen; Denmark
2000 Sydney	Ekaterina Karsten; Belarus	Rumyana Neykova; Bulgaria	Katrin Rutschow-Stomporowski; Germany
2004 Athens	Katrin Rutschow-Stomporowski; Germany	Ekaterina Karsten; Belarus	Rumyana Neykova; Bulgaria
2008 Beijing	Rumyana Neykova; Bulgaria	Michelle Guerette; United States	Ekaterina Karsten; Belarus
2012 London	Miroslava Knapková; Czech Republic	Fie Udby Erichsen; Denmark	Kim Crow; Australia
2016 Rio de Janeiro	Kim Brennan; Australia	Genevra Stone; United States	Duan Jingli; China
2020 Tokyo	Emma Twigg; New Zealand	Hanna Prakatsen; ROC	Magdalena Lobnig; Austria
2024 Paris	Karolien Florijn; Netherlands	Emma Twigg; New Zealand	Viktorija Senkutė; Lithuania
2028 Los Angeles			

=== Double sculls ===
Games	Gold	Silver	Bronze
1976 Montreal	Svetla Otsetova and Zdravka Yordanova; Bulgaria	Sabine Jahn and Petra Boesler; East Germany	Eleonora Kaminskaitė and Genovaitė Ramoškienė; Soviet Union
1980 Moscow	Yelena Khloptseva and Larisa Popova; Soviet Union	Cornelia Linse and Heidi Westphal; East Germany	Olga Homeghi and Valeria Răcilă; Romania
1984 Los Angeles	Marioara Popescu and Elisabeta Oleniuc; Romania	Greet Hellemans and Nicolette Hellemans; Netherlands	Daniele Laumann and Silken Laumann; Canada
1988 Seoul	Birgit Peter and Martina Schröter; East Germany	Veronica Cogeanu and Elisabeta Lipă; Romania	Stefka Madina and Violeta Ninova; Bulgaria
1992 Barcelona	Kerstin Köppen and Kathrin Boron; Germany	Veronica Cochela and Elisabeta Lipă; Romania	Gu Xiaoli and Lu Huali; China
1996 Atlanta	Kathleen Heddle and Marnie McBean; Canada	Zhang Xiuyun and Cao Mianying; China	Irene Eijs and Eeke van Nes; Netherlands
2000 Sydney	Jana Thieme and Kathrin Boron; Germany	Pieta van Dishoeck and Eeke van Nes; Netherlands	Birutė Šakickienė and Kristina Poplavskaja; Lithuania
2004 Athens	Georgina Evers-Swindell and Caroline Evers-Swindell; New Zealand	Peggy Waleska and Britta Oppelt; Germany	Sarah Winckless and Elise Laverick; Great Britain
2008 Beijing	Georgina Evers-Swindell and Caroline Evers-Swindell; New Zealand	Annekatrin Thiele and Christiane Huth; Germany	Elise Laverick and Anna Bebington; Great Britain
2012 London	Anna Watkins and Katherine Grainger; Great Britain	Kim Crow and Brooke Pratley; Australia	Magdalena Fularczyk and Julia Michalska; Poland
2016 Rio de Janeiro	Magdalena Fularczyk and Natalia Madaj; Poland	Victoria Thornley and Katherine Grainger; Great Britain	Donata Vištartaitė and Milda Valčiukaitė; Lithuania
2020 Tokyo	Nicoleta-Ancuţa Bodnar and Simona Radis; Romania	Brooke Donoghue and Hannah Osborne; New Zealand	Roos de Jong and Lisa Scheenaard; Netherlands
2024 Paris	Brooke Francis and Lucy Spoors; New Zealand	Ancuța Bodnar and Simona Radiș; Romania	Mathilda Hodgkins-Byrne and Becky Wilde; Great Britain
2028 Los Angeles			

=== Quadruple sculls ===
Note: coxed event (1976–1984), coxless event (1988–)

Games	Gold	Silver	Bronze
1976 Montreal	East Germany; Anke Borchmann; Jutta Lau; Viola Poley; Roswietha Zobelt; Liane Weigelt	Soviet Union; Anna Kondrachina; Mira Bryunina; Larisa Aleksandrova; Galina Ermolaeva; Nadezhda Chernyshyova	Romania; Ioana Tudoran; Maria Micșa; Felicia Afrăsiloaie; Elisabeta Lazăr; Elena Giurcă
1980 Moscow	East Germany; Sybille Reinhardt; Jutta Ploch; Jutta Lau; Roswietha Zobelt; Liane Buhr	Soviet Union; Antonina Pustovit; Yelena Matiyevskaya; Olga Vasilchenko; Nadezhda Lyubimova; Nina Cheremisina	Bulgaria; Mariana Serbezova; Rumelyana Boncheva; Dolores Nakova; Anka Bakova; Anka Georgieva
1984 Los Angeles	Romania; Titie Taran; Anisoara Sorohan; Ioana Badea; Sofia Corban; Ecaterina Oancia	United States; Anne Marden; Lisa Rohde; Joan Lind; Virginia Gilder; Kelly Rickon	Denmark; Hanne Eriksen; Birgitte Hanel; Charlotte Koefoed; Bodil Rasmussen; Jette Sørensen
1988 Seoul	East Germany; Kerstin Förster; Kristina Mundt; Beate Schramm; Jana Sorgers	Soviet Union; Irina Kalimbet; Svitlana Maziy; Inna Frolova; Antonina Zelikovich	Romania; Anişoara Bălan; Anişoara Minea; Veronica Cogeanu; Elisabeta Lipă
1992 Barcelona	Germany; Sybille Schmidt; Birgit Peter; Kerstin Müller; Kristina Mundt	Romania; Anişoara Dobre; Doina Ignat; Constanța Burcică; Veronica Cochela	Unified Team; Antonina Zelikovich; Tetiana Ustiuzhanina; Ekaterina Karsten; Yelena Khloptseva
1996 Atlanta	Germany; Katrin Rutschow-Stomporowski; Jana Sorgers; Kerstin Köppen; Kathrin Boron	Ukraine; Svitlana Maziy; Dina Miftakhutdynova; Inna Frolova; Olena Ronzhyna	Canada; Laryssa Biesenthal; Diane O'Grady; Kathleen Heddle; Marnie McBean
2000 Sydney	Germany; Manja Kowalski; Meike Evers; Manuela Lutze; Kerstin Kowalski	Great Britain; Guin Batten; Gillian Lindsay; Katherine Grainger; Miriam Batten	Russia; Oksana Dorodnova; Irina Fedotova; Yuliya Levina; Larisa Merk
2004 Athens	Germany; Kathrin Boron; Meike Evers; Manuela Lutze; Kerstin El Qalqili	Great Britain; Alison Mowbray; Debbie Flood; Frances Houghton; Rebecca Romero	Australia; Dana Faletic; Rebecca Sattin; Amber Bradley; Kerry Hore
2008 Beijing	China; Tang Bin; Xi Aihua; Jin Ziwei; Zhang Yangyang	Great Britain; Annabel Vernon; Debbie Flood; Frances Houghton; Katherine Grainger	Germany; Britta Oppelt; Manuela Lutze; Kathrin Boron; Stephanie Schiller
2012 London	Ukraine; Kateryna Tarasenko; Nataliya Dovhodko; Anastasiya Kozhenkova; Yana Dementyeva	Germany; Annekatrin Thiele; Carina Bär; Julia Richter; Britta Oppelt	United States; Natalie Dell; Kara Kohler; Megan Kalmoe; Adrienne Martelli
2016 Rio de Janeiro	Germany; Annekatrin Thiele; Carina Bär; Julia Lier; Lisa Schmidla	Netherlands; Chantal Achterberg; Nicole Beukers; Inge Janssen; Carline Bouw	Poland; Maria Springwald; Joanna Leszczyńska; Agnieszka Kobus; Monika Ciaciuch
2020 Tokyo	China; Chen Yunxia; Zhang Ling; Lü Yang; Cui Xiaotong	Poland; Agnieszka Kobus; Marta Wieliczko; Maria Sajdak; Katarzyna Zillmann	Australia; Ria Thompson; Rowena Meredith; Harriet Hudson; Caitlin Cronin
2024 Paris	Great Britain; Lauren Henry; Hannah Scott; Lola Anderson; Georgina Brayshaw	Netherlands; Laila Youssifou; Bente Paulis; Roos de Jong; Tessa Dullemans	Germany; Maren Völz; Tabea Schendekehl; Leonie Menzel; Pia Greiten
2028 Los Angeles			

=== Coxless pairs ===
Games	Gold	Silver	Bronze
1976 Montreal	Siyka Kelbecheva and Stoyanka Gruycheva; Bulgaria	Angelika Noack and Sabine Dähne; East Germany	Edith Eckbauer and Thea Einöder; West Germany
1980 Moscow	Ute Steindorf and Cornelia Klier; East Germany	Małgorzata Dłużewska and Czesława Kościańska; Poland	Siika Barboulova and Stoyanka Kurbatova; Bulgaria
1984 Los Angeles	Rodica Arba and Elena Horvat; Romania	Elizabeth Craig and Tricia Smith; Canada	Ellen Becker and Iris Völkner; West Germany
1988 Seoul	Rodica Arba and Olga Homeghi; Romania	Radka Stoyanova and Lalka Berberova; Bulgaria	Nikki Payne and Lynley Hannen; New Zealand
1992 Barcelona	Kathleen Heddle and Marnie McBean; Canada	Ingeburg Schwerzmann and Stefani Werremeier; Germany	Stephanie Pierson and Anna Seaton; United States
1996 Atlanta	Megan Still and Kate Slatter; Australia	Karen Kraft and Melissa Schwen; United States	Christine Gossé and Hélène Cortin; France
2000 Sydney	Georgeta Damian and Doina Ignat; Romania	Kate Slatter and Rachael Taylor; Australia	Karen Kraft and Melissa Ryan; United States
2004 Athens	Georgeta Damian and Viorica Susanu; Romania	Katherine Grainger and Cath Bishop; Great Britain	Yuliya Bichyk and Natallia Helakh; Belarus
2008 Beijing	Georgeta Damian and Viorica Susanu; Romania	Wu You and Gao Yulan; China	Yuliya Bichyk and Natallia Helakh; Belarus
2012 London	Helen Glover and Heather Stanning; Great Britain	Kate Hornsey and Sarah Tait; Australia	Juliette Haigh and Rebecca Scown; New Zealand
2016 Rio de Janeiro	Helen Glover and Heather Stanning; Great Britain	Genevieve Behrent and Rebecca Scown; New Zealand	Hedvig Rasmussen and Anne Andersen; Denmark
2020 Tokyo	Grace Prendergast and Kerri Gowler; New Zealand	Vasilisa Stepanova and Elena Oriabinskaia; ROC	Caileigh Filmer and Hillary Janssens; Canada
2024 Paris	Ymkje Clevering and Veronique Meester; Netherlands	Ioana Vrînceanu and Roxana Anghel; Romania	Jessica Morrison and Annabelle McIntyre; Australia
2028 Los Angeles			

=== Coxless four ===
Games	Gold	Silver	Bronze
1992 Barcelona	Canada; Kirsten Barnes; Jessica Monroe; Brenda Taylor; Kay Worthington	United States; Shelagh Donohoe; Cynthia Eckert; Carol Feeney; Amy Fuller	Germany; Antje Frank; Annette Hohn; Gabriele Mehl; Birte Siech
1996–2016	not included in the Olympic program.		
2020 Tokyo	Australia; Lucy Stephan; Rosemary Popa; Jessica Morrison; Annabelle McIntyre	Netherlands; Ellen Hogerwerf; Karolien Florijn; Ymkje Clevering; Veronique Meester	Ireland; Aifric Keogh; Eimear Lambe; Fiona Murtagh; Emily Hegarty
2024 Paris	Netherlands; Marloes Oldenburg; Hermijntje Drenth; Tinka Offereins; Benthe Boonstra	Great Britain; Helen Glover; Esme Booth; Samantha Redgrave; Rebecca Shorten	New Zealand; Jackie Gowler; Phoebe Spoors; Davina Waddy; Kerri Williams
2028 Los Angeles			

=== Eight ===
Games	Gold	Silver	Bronze
1976 Montreal	East Germany; Brigitte Ahrenholz; Henrietta Ebert; Viola Goretzki; Monika Kallies; Christiane Knetsch; Helma Lehmann; Irina Müller; Ilona Richter; Marina Wilke	Soviet Union; Olga Guzenko; Olga Kolkova; Klavdiya Kozenkova; Olga Pugovskaya; Nadezhda Roshchina; Nadezhda Rozgon; Lyubov Talalaeva; Nelli Tarakanova; Elena Zubko	United States; Carol Brown; Anita Defrantz; Carolyn Graves; Marion Greig; Peggy McCarthy; Gail Ricketson; Lynn Silliman; Anne Warner; Jacqueline Zoch
1980 Moscow	East Germany; Martina Boesler; Christiane Knetsch; Gabriele Lohs; Karin Metze; Kersten Neisser; Ilona Richter; Marita Sandig; Birgit Schütz; Marina Wilke	Soviet Union; Nina Frolova; Mariya Payun; Olga Pivovarova; Nina Preobrazhenskaya; Nadezhda Prishchepa; Tatyana Stetsenko; Elena Tereshina; Nina Umanets; Valentina Zhulina	Romania; Angelica Aposteanu; Elena Bondar; Florica Bucur; Maria Constantinescu; Elena Dobrițoiu; Rodica Frîntu; Ana Iliuță; Rodica Puscatu-Arba; Marlena Zagoni
1984 Los Angeles	United States; Betsy Beard; Carol Bower; Jeanne Flanagan; Carie Graves; Kathy Keeler; Harriet Metcalf; Kristine Norelius; Shyril O'Steen; Kristen Thorsness	Romania; Mihaela Armășescu; Doina Balan; Adriana Bazon; Camelia Diaconescu; Viorica Ioja; Aneta Mihaly; Aurora Plesca; Lucia Sauca; Marioara Trașcă	Netherlands; Lynda Cornet; Marieke van Drogenbroek; Harriet van Ettekoven; Greet Hellemans; Nicolette Hellemans; Martha Laurijsen; Catharina Neelissen; Anne Quist; Wiljon Vaandrager
1988 Seoul	East Germany; Ramona Balthasar; Kathrin Haacker; Anja Kluge; Daniela Neunast; Beatrix Schröer; Ute Stange; Annegret Strauch; Ute Wild; Judith Zeidler	Romania; Herta Anitaș; Mihaela Armășescu; Doina Balan; Adriana Bazon; Olga Homeghi; Veronica Necula; Ecaterina Oancia; Rodica Puscatu; Marioara Trașcă	China; Han Yaqin; He Yanwen; Hu Ya-Dong; Li Rong-Hua; Yang Xiao; Zhang Xiang-Hua; Zhang Yali; Zhou Shouying; Zhou Xiuhua
1992 Barcelona	Canada; Kirsten Barnes; Shannon Crawford; Megan Delehanty; Kathleen Heddle; Marnie McBean; Jessica Monroe; Brenda Taylor; Lesley Thompson; Kay Worthington	Romania; Adriana Bazon; Iulia Bulie; Elena Georgescu; Victoria Lepădatu; Veronica Necula; Ioana Olteanu; Maria Padurariu; Doina Robu; Doina Snep	Germany; Sylvia Dördelmann; Kathrin Haacker; Christiane Harzendorf; Daniela Neunast; Cerstin Petersmann; Dana Pyritz; Ute Wagner; Annegret Strauch; Judith Zeidler
1996 Atlanta	Romania; Veronica Cochela; Liliana Gafencu; Elena Georgescu; Doina Ignat; Elisabeta Lipă; Ioana Olteanu; Marioara Popescu; Doina Spîrcu; Anca Tănase	Canada; Alison Korn; Theresa Luke; Maria Maunder; Heather McDermid; Jessica Monroe; Emma Robinson; Lesley Thompson; Tosha Tsang; Anna van der Kamp	Belarus; Tamara Davydenko; Nataliya Lavrinenko; Yelena Mikulich; Aleksandra Pankina; Yaroslava Pavlovich; Valentina Skrabatun; Nataliya Stasyuk; Nataliya Volchek; Marina Znak
2000 Sydney	Romania; Veronica Cochela; Georgeta Damian; Maria Magdalena Dumitrache; Liliana Gafencu; Elena Georgescu; Doina Ignat; Elisabeta Lipă; Ioana Olteanu; Viorica Susanu	Netherlands; Tessa Appeldoorn; Carin ter Beek; Pieta van Dishoeck; Elien Meijer; Eeke van Nes; Nelleke Penninx; Martijntje Quik; Anneke Venema; Marieke Westerhof	Canada; Buffy Alexander; Laryssa Biesenthal; Heather Davis; Alison Korn; Theresa Luke; Heather McDermid; Emma Robinson; Lesley Thompson; Dorota Urbaniak
2004 Athens	Romania; Aurica Bărăscu; Georgeta Damian; Rodica Florea; Liliana Gafencu; Elena Georgescu; Doina Ignat; Elisabeta Lipă; Ioana Papuc; Viorica Susanu	United States; Alison Cox; Caryn Davies; Megan Dirkmaat; Kate Johnson; Laurel Korholz; Samantha Magee; Anna Mickelson; Lianne Nelson; Mary Whipple	Netherlands; Annemiek de Haan; Hurnet Dekkers; Nienke Hommes; Annemarieke van Rumpt; Sarah Siegelaar; Marlies Smulders; Helen Tanger; Froukje Wegman; Ester Workel
2008 Beijing	United States; Erin Cafaro; Lindsay Shoop; Anna Goodale; Elle Logan; Anna Cummins; Susan Francia; Caroline Lind; Caryn Davies; Mary Whipple	Netherlands; Femke Dekker; Marlies Smulders; Nienke Kingma; Roline Repelaer van Driel; Annemarieke van Rumpt; Helen Tanger; Sarah Siegelaar; Annemiek de Haan; Ester Workel	Romania; Constanța Burcică; Viorica Susanu; Rodica Şerban; Enikő Barabás; Simona Muşat; Ioana Papuc; Georgeta Andrunache; Doina Ignat; Elena Georgescu
2012 London	United States; Erin Cafaro; Susan Francia; Esther Lofgren; Taylor Ritzel; Meghan Musnicki; Elle Logan; Caroline Lind; Caryn Davies; Mary Whipple	Canada; Janine Hanson; Rachelle Viinberg; Krista Guloien; Lauren Wilkinson; Natalie Mastracci; Ashley Brzozowicz; Darcy Marquardt; Andréanne Morin; Lesley Thompson-Willie	Netherlands; Jacobine Veenhoven; Nienke Kingma; Chantal Achterberg; Sytske de Groot; Roline Repelaer van Driel; Claudia Belderbos; Carline Bouw; Annemiek de Haan; Anne Schellekens
2016 Rio de Janeiro	United States; Emily Regan; Kerry Simmonds; Amanda Polk; Lauren Schmetterling; Tessa Gobbo; Meghan Musnicki; Elle Logan; Amanda Elmore; Katelin Snyder	Great Britain; Katie Greves; Melanie Wilson; Frances Houghton; Polly Swann; Jessica Eddie; Olivia Carnegie-Brown; Karen Bennett; Zoe Lee; Zoe de Toledo	Romania; Roxana Cogianu; Ioana Strungaru; Mihaela Petrilă; Iuliana Popa; Mădălina Beres; Laura Oprea; Adelina Boguș; Andreea Boghian; Daniela Druncea
2020 Tokyo	Canada; Susanne Grainger; Kasia Gruchalla-Wesierski; Madison Mailey; Sydney Payne; Andrea Proske; Lisa Roman; Christine Roper; Avalon Wasteneys; Kristen Kit	New Zealand; Ella Greenslade; Emma Dyke; Lucy Spoors; Kelsey Bevan; Grace Prendergast; Kerri Gowler; Beth Ross; Jackie Gowler; Caleb Shepherd	China; Guo Linlin; Ju Rui; Li Jingjing; Miao Tian; Wang Zifeng; Wang Yuwei; Xu Fei; Zhang Min; Zhang Dechang
2024 Paris	Romania; Adriana Adam; Roxana Anghel; Amalia Bereș; Mădălina Bereș; Iuliana Buhuș; Dumitrița Juncănariu; Ioana Vrînceanu; Simona Radiș; Victoria-Ștefania Petreanu c	Canada; Abigail Dent; Caileigh Filmer; Kasia Gruchalla-Wesierski; Maya Meschkuleit; Sydney Payne; Jessica Sevick; Kristina Walker; Avalon Wasteneys; Kristen Kit c	Great Britain; Annie Campbell-Orde; Holly Dunford; Emily Ford; Lauren Irwin; Heidi Long; Rowan McKellar; Eve Stewart; Harriet Taylor; Henry Fieldman c
2028 Los Angeles			

== Coming soon ==
=== Coastal rowing ===
==== Single sculls ====
Games	Gold	Silver	Bronze
2028 Los Angeles			

== Discontinued events ==
=== Coxed four ===
Games	Gold	Silver	Bronze
1976 Montreal	East Germany; Karin Metze; Bianka Schwede; Gabriele Lohs; Andrea Kurth; Sabine Heß	Bulgaria; Kapka Georgieva; Ginka Gyurova; Mariyka Modeva; Lilyana Vaseva; Reni Yordanova	Soviet Union; Lyudmila Krokhina; Lidiya Krylova; Galina Mishenina; Anna Pasokha; Nadezhda Sevostyanova
1980 Moscow	East Germany; Silvia Fröhlich; Ramona Kapheim; Angelika Noack; Romy Saalfeld; Kirsten Wenzel	Bulgaria; Nadiya Filipova; Ginka Gurova; Mariika Modeva; Rita Todorova; Iskra Velinova	Soviet Union; Nina Cheremisina; Mariya Fadeyeva; Svetlana Semyonova; Galina Sovetnikova; Marina Studneva
1984 Los Angeles	Romania; Chira Apostol; Olga Homeghi; Viorica Ioja; Florica Lavric; Maria Fricioiu	Canada; Barbara Armbrust; Marilyn Brain; Angela Schneider; Lesley Thompson; Jane Tregunno	Australia; Karen Brancourt; Susan Chapman; Margot Foster; Robyn Grey-Gardner; Susan Lee
1988 Seoul	East Germany; Gerlinde Doberschütz; Carola Hornig; Sylvia Rose; Birte Siech; Martina Walther	China; Hu Ya-Dong; Li Rong-Hua; Yang Xiao; Zhang Xiang-Hua; Zhou Shouying	Romania; Herta Anitaș; Doina Șnep-Bălan; Veronica Necula; Ecaterina Oancia; Marioara Trașcă

=== Lightweight double sculls ===
Games	Gold	Silver	Bronze
1996 Atlanta	Constanța Burcică and Camelia Macoviciuc; Romania	Teresa Bell and Lindsay Burns; United States	Virginia Lee and Rebecca Joyce; Australia
2000 Sydney	Constanța Burcică and Angela Alupei; Romania	Valerie Viehoff and Claudia Blasberg; Germany	Christine Collins and Sarah Garner; United States
2004 Athens	Constanța Burcică and Angela Alupei; Romania	Daniela Reimer and Claudia Blasberg; Germany	Kirsten van der Kolk and Marit van Eupen; Netherlands
2008 Beijing	Kirsten van der Kolk and Marit van Eupen; Netherlands	Minna Nieminen and Sanna Stén; Finland	Tracy Cameron and Melanie Kok; Canada
2012 London	Katherine Copeland and Sophie Hosking; Great Britain	Xu Dongxiang and Huang Wenyi; China	Christina Giazitzidou and Alexandra Tsiavou; Greece
2016 Rio de Janeiro	Ilse Paulis and Maaike Head; Netherlands	Lindsay Jennerich and Patricia Obee; Canada	Huang Wenyi and Pan Feihong; China
2020 Tokyo	Valentina Rodini and Federica Cesarini; Italy	Laura Tarantola and Claire Bové; France	Marieke Keijser and Ilse Paulis; Netherlands
2024 Paris	Emily Craig and Imogen Grant; Great Britain	Gianina Beleagă and Ionela Cozmiuc; Romania	Dimitra Kontou and Zoi Fitsiou; Greece
