= Soviet Union at the 1976 Summer Olympics =

- Flag of the Soviet Union
- IOC code: URS
- NOC: Soviet Olympic Committee

in Montreal, Canada 17 July 1976 – 1 August 1976
- Competitors: 410 (285 men and 125 women) in 22 sports
- Flag bearer: Vasily Alekseyev
- Medals Ranked 1st: Gold 49 Silver 41 Bronze 35 Total 125

Summer Olympics appearances (overview)
- 1952; 1956; 1960; 1964; 1968; 1972; 1976; 1980; 1984; 1988

Other related appearances
- Russian Empire (1900–1912); Estonia (1920–1936, 1992–pres.); Latvia (1924–1936, 1992–pres.); Lithuania (1924–1928, 1992–pres.); Unified Team (1992); Armenia (1994–pres.); Belarus (1994–2020); Georgia (1994–pres.); Kazakhstan (1994–pres.); Kyrgyzstan (1994–pres.); Moldova (1994–pres.); Russia (1994–2016); Ukraine (1994–pres.); Uzbekistan (1994–pres.); Azerbaijan (1996–pres.); Tajikistan (1996–pres.); Turkmenistan (1996–pres.); ROC (2020); Individual Neutral Athletes (2024)

The Soviet Union (USSR) competed at the 1976 Summer Olympics in the city of Montreal, Quebec, Canada. 410 competitors, 285 men and 125 women, took part in 189 events in 22 sports. As the country hosted the next Olympics in Moscow, a live video feed from the city was shown at the closing ceremony.

== Medalists ==
The Soviet Union won 49 gold and 125 overall medals, finishing first in the medal standings by both parameters.

=== Gold ===
- Nikolai Andrianov — artistic gymnastics, men's floor exercise
- Nellie Kim — artistic gymnastics, women's floor exercise
- Nikolai Andrianov — artistic gymnastics, men's individual all-round
- Nikolai Andrianov — artistic gymnastics, men's rings
- Svetlana Grozdova, Elvira Saadi, Maria Filatova, Olga Korbut, Ludmilla Tourischeva and Nellie Kim — artistic gymnastics, women's team competition
- Nikolai Andrianov — artistic gymnastics, men's vault
- Nellie Kim — artistic gymnastics, women's vault
- Viktor Saneyev — athletics, men's triple jump
- Yuri Sedykh — athletics, men's hammer throw
- Tatyana Kazankina — athletics, women's 800m
- Tatyana Kazankina — athletics, women's 1500m
- Angele Rupshene, Tatjana Zakharova, Raisa Kurvyakova, Olga Barisheva, Tatjana Ovetchkina, Nadezhda Shuvaeva, Uljana Semjonova, Nadezhda Zakharova, Nelli Feryabnikova, Olga Sukharnova, Tamara Daunene and Natalia Klimova — basketball, women's team competition
- Aleksandr Rogov — canoeing, men's C1 500m
- Sergei Petrenko and Aleksandr Vinogradov — canoeing, men's C2 500m
- Sergei Petrenko and Aleksandr Vinogradov — canoeing, men's C2 1000m
- Sergei Nagornyi and Vladimir Romanovsky — canoeing, men's K2 1000m
- Sergei Chukhrai, Aleksandr Degtyarev, Yuri Filatov and Vladimir Morozov — canoeing, men's K4 1000m
- Nina Gopova and Galina Kreft — canoeing, women's K2 500m
- Anatoli Chukanov, Valeri Chaplygin, Vladimir Kaminsky and Aavo Pikkuus — cycling road, men's team time trial
- Elena Vaytsekhovskaya — diving, women's 10m platform
- Elena Novikova-Belova, Olga Knyazeva, Valentina Sidorova, Nailia Giliazova and Valentina Nikonova — fencing, women's foil team
- Viktor Krovopuskov — fencing, men's sabre individual
- Viktor Krovopuskov, Eduard Vinokurov, Viktor Sidyak, Vladimir Nazlymov and Mikhail Burtsev — fencing, men's sabre team
- Aleksandr Resanov, Nikolay Tomin, Sergey Kushniryuk, Jury Lagutin, Vladimir Maksimov, Jury Kidyaev, Jury Klimov, Vladimir Kravtsov, Valery Gassy, Vasily Ilyin, Mikhail Ishchenko, Aleksandr Anpilogov, Yevgeni Chernyshov and Anatoly Fedyukin — handball, men's team competition
- Natalya Timoshkina-Sherstyuk, Zinaida Turchina, Halyna Zakharova, Rafiga Shabanova, Lyudmila Shubina, Lyubov Odinokova-Berezhnaya, Lyudmila Panchuk, Lyudmila Poradnik-Bobrus, Mariya Litoshenko, Nina Lobova, Aldona Neneniene-Cesaitìte, Tatyana Glushchenko, Larisa Karlova and Tatyana Kotchergina-Makarets — handball, women's team competition
- Sergei Novikov — judo, men's heavyweight
- Vladimir Nevzorov — judo, men's half-middleweight
- Vladimir Eshinov, Nikolay Ivanov, Mikhail Kuznetsov, Aleksandr Klepikov, Aleksandr Lukyanov (cox), and Aleksandr Sema — rowing, men's four-oared shell with coxswain
- Aleksandr Gazov — shooting, men's running game target
- Marina Kosheveya — swimming, women's 200m breaststroke
- Aleksandr Voronin — weightlifting, men's flyweight
- Nikolay Kolesnikov — weightlifting, men's featherweight
- Pyotr Korol — weightlifting, men's lightweight
- Valery Shary — weightlifting, men's light heavyweight
- David Rigert — weightlifting, men's middle heavyweight
- Yury Zaytsev — weightlifting, men's heavyweight
- Vasily Alekseyev — weightlifting, men's super heavyweight
- Aleksey Shumakov — wrestling, men's Greco-Roman light flyweight
- Vitaly Konstantinov — wrestling, men's Greco-Roman flyweight
- Suren Nalbandyan — wrestling, men's Greco-Roman lightweight
- Anatoly Bykov — wrestling, men's Greco-Roman welterweight
- Valery Rezantsev — wrestling, men's Greco-Roman light heavyweight
- Nikolay Balboshin — wrestling, men's Greco-Roman heavyweight
- Aleksandr Kolchinsky — wrestling, men's Greco-Roman super heavyweight
- Vladimir Yumin — wrestling, men's freestyle bantamweight
- Pavel Pynigyn — wrestling, men's freestyle lightweight
- Levan Tediashvili — wrestling, men's freestyle light heavyweight
- Ivan Yarygin — wrestling, men's freestyle heavyweight
- Soslan Andiyev — wrestling, men's freestyle super heavyweight

=== Silver ===
- Valentyna Kovpan — archery, women's individual competition
- Olga Korbut — artistic gymnastics, women's balance beam
- Vladimir Marchenko — artistic gymnastics, men's floor exercise
- Ludmilla Tourischeva — artistic gymnastics, women's floor exercise
- Nellie Kim — artistic gymnastics, women's individual all-around
- Nikolai Andrianov — artistic gymnastics, men's parallel bars
- Alexander Dityatin — artistic gymnastics, men's rings
- Vladimir Tikhonov, Gennady Krysin, Vladimir Marchenko, Alexander Dityatin, Vladimir Markelov and Nikolai Andrianov — artistic gymnastics, men's team competition
- Ludmilla Tourischeva — artistic gymnastics, women's vault
- Yevgeny Mironov — athletics, men's shot tut
- Aleksey Spiridonov — athletics, men's hammer throw
- Tatyana Anisimova — athletics, women's 100m hurdles
- Nadezhda Chizhova — athletics, women's shot put
- Rufat Riskiev — boxing, men's 71–75 kg
- Vasili Yurchenko — canoeing, men's C-1 1000m
- Tatyana Korshunova — canoeing, women's K-1 500m
- Sergei Nagornyi, Vladimir Romanovsky — canoeing, men's K-2 500m
- Vladimir Osokin, Aleksandr Perov, Vitali Petrakov and Viktor Sokolov — cycling, men's team pursuit
- Aleksander Romankov — fencing, men's foil individual
- Vladimir Nazlymov — fencing, men's sabre individual
- Valeri Dvoinikov — judo, men's middleweight
- Ramaz Kharshiladze — judo, men's half-heavyweight
- Pavel Lednev — modern pentathlon, men's individual competition
- Lyubov Talalaeva, Nadezhda Roshchina, Klavdiya Kozenkova, Elena Zubko, Olga Kolkova, Nelli Tarakanova, Nadezhda Rozgon, Olga Guzenko and Olga Pugovskaya — rowing, women's eight with coxswain
- Dmitri Bekhterev, Yuri Shurkalov and Yuri Lorentson — rowing, men's pair-oared shell with coxswain
- Anna Kondrashina, Mira Bryunina, Larissa Alexandrova-Popova, Galina Ermolaeva and Nadezhda Chernyshyova — rowing, women's quadruple sculls with coxswain
- Yevgeniy Duleyev, Yuriy Yakimov, Aivar Lazdenieks and Vytautas Butkus — rowing, men's quadruple sculls without coxswain
- Andrey Balashov — sailing, men's Finn
- Vladislav Akimenko and Valentyn Mankin — sailing, men's tempest
- Aleksandr Kedyarov — shooting, men's running game target
- Andrey Bogdanov, Sergey Kopliakov, Andrey Krylov and Vladimir Raskatov — swimming, men's 4 × 200 m freestyle relay
- Lyubov Rusanova — swimming, women's 100m breaststroke
- Marina Yurchenya — swimming, women's 200m breaststroke
- Aleksandr Yermilov, Vyacheslav Zaytsev, Yury Starunsky, Vladimir Ulanov, Anatoly Polishchuk, Aleksandr Savin, Pavel Selivanov, Vladimir Kondra, Oleg Moliboga, Vladimir Chernyshov, Yefim Chulak and Vladimir Dorokhov — volleyball, men's team competition
- Zoya Yusova, Inna Ryskal, Lyudmila Shchetinina, Nina Smoleyeva, Liliya Osadchaya, Anna Rostova, Lyubov Rudovskaya, Olga Kozakova, Natalya Kushnir, Nina Muradyan, Larisa Bergen and Lyudmila Chernyshova — volleyball, women's team competition
- Vardan Militosyan — weightlifting, men's middleweight
- Nelson Davidyan — wrestling, men's Greco-Roman featherweight
- Vladimir Cheboksarov — wrestling, men's Greco-Roman middleweight
- Roman Dimitriyev — wrestling, men's freestyle light flyweight
- Aleksandr Ivanov — wrestling, men's freestyle flyweight
- Viktor Novozhilov — wrestling, men's freestyle middleweight

=== Bronze ===
- Zebiniso Rustamova — archery, women's individual competition
- Ludmilla Tourischeva — artistic gymnastics, women's individual all-around
- Nikolai Andrianov — artistic gymnastics, men's pommel horse
- Valeriy Borzov — athletics, men's 100m
- Yevgeniy Gavrilenko — athletics, men's 400m hurdles
- Aleksandr Aksinin, Valeriy Borzov, Nikolay Kolesnikov and Juris Silovs — athletics, men's 4 × 100 m relay
- Alexandr Baryshnikov — athletics, men's shot put men
- Mykola Avilov — athletics, men's decathlon
- Anatoliy Bondarchuk — athletics, men's hammer throw
- Natalya Lebedeva — athletics, women's 100m hurdles
- Vera Anisimova, Nadezhda Besfamilnaya, Lyudmila Maslakova and Tatyana Prorochenko — athletics, women's 4 × 100 m relay
- Lyudmila Aksyonova, Nadezhda Ilyina, Inta Kļimoviča and Natalya Sokolova — athletics, women's 4 × 400 m relay
- Lidiya Alfeyeva — athletics, women's long jump
- Alzhan Zharmukhamedov, Vladimir Zhigily, Vladimir Tkachenko, Valery Miloserdov, Anatoly Myshkin, Aleksandr Salnikov, Ivan Edeshko, Mikheil Korkia, Andrey Makeyev, Vladimir Arzamaskov, Aleksandr Belov and Sergey Belov — basketball, men's team competition
- David Torosyan — boxing, men's flyweight
- Viktor Rybakov — boxing, men's bantamweight
- Vasily Solomin — boxing, men's lightweight
- Viktor Savchenko — boxing, men's light middleweight
- Vladimir Aleynik — diving, men's 10m platform
- Aleksandr Kosenkov — diving, men's 3m springboard
- Elena Novikova-Belova — fencing, women's foil individual
- Viktor Sidyak — fencing, men's sabre individual
- Vladimir Troshkin, David Kipiani, Vladimir Veremeyev, Viktor Zvyagintsev, Leonid Nazarenko, Vladimir Onishchenko, Stefan Reshko, Anatoly Konkov, Viktor Matviyenko, Aleksandr Minayev, Mikhail Fomenko, Vladimir Fyodorov, Viktor Kolotov, Vladimir Astapovsky, Oleg Blokhin, Aleksandr Prokhorov and Leonid Buryak — football (soccer), men's team competition
- Shota Chochishvili — judo, men's open category
- Eleonora Kaminskaitė, Genovaitė Ramoškienė — rowing, women's double sculls
- Raul Arnemann, Nikolai Kuznetsov, Valeriy Dolinin and Anushavan Gasan-Dzhalalov — rowing, men's four without coxswain
- Nadezhda Sevostyanova, Lyudmila Krokhina, Galina Mishenina, Anna Pasokha and Lidiya Krylova — rowing, women's four-oared shell with coxswain
- Elena Antonova — rowing, women's single sculls
- Gennady Lushchikov — shooting, men's small-bore rifle, prone
- Vladimir Raskatov — swimming, men's 400m freestyle
- Arvydas Juozaitis — swimming, men's 100 m breaststroke
- Marina Kosheveya — swimming, women's 100m breaststroke
- Lyubov Rusanova — swimming, women's 200m breaststroke
- Andrey Smirnov — swimming, men's 400m individual medley
- Farhat Mustafin — wrestling, men's Greco-Roman bantamweight

== Archery ==
Women's individual competition:

- Valentina Kovpan — 2460 points (→ Silver medal)
- Zebiniso Rustamova — 2407 points (→ Bronze medal)

Men's individual competition:

- Vladimir Chendarov — 2467 points (→ 5th place)

== Athletics ==
Men's 800 metres

- Viktor Anohin

- Heat — 1:46.81 (→ did not advance)

Men's 4x100 metres relay

- Aleksandr Aksinin, Nikolay Kolesnikov, Juris Silovs and Valeriy Borzov

- Heat — 39.98
- Semifinal — 39.36
- Final — 38.78s (→ Bronze medal)

Men's 4x400 metres relay

- Dmitriy Stukalov, Vladimir Ponomaryov, Viktor Anohin and Yevgeniy Gavrilenko

- Heat — 3:07.72 (→ did not advance)

Men's marathon

- Leonid Moseyev — 2:13:22 (→ 7th place)
- Alexander Gotskiy — 2:15:34 (→ 9th place)
- Yuriy Velikorodnyh — 2:19:45 (→ 24th place)

Men's 400m hurdles

- Yevgeniy Gavrilenko

- Heat — 50.93s
- Semifinal — 49.73s
- Final — 49.45s (→ Bronze medal)

- Dmitriy Stukalov

- Heat — 50.78s
- Semifinal — 50.47s (→ did not advance)

Men's long jump

- Valeriy Podlujnyi

- Qualification — 7.90m
- Final — 7.88m (→ 7th place)

- Aleksey Pereverzev

- Qualification — 7.78m
- Final — 7.66m (→ 10th place)

- Tõnu Lepik

- Qualification — 7.49m (→ did not advance)

Men's high jump

- Sergey Budalov

- Qualification — 2.16m
- Final — 2.21m (→ 4th place)

- Sergey Senyukov

- Qualification — 2.16m
- Final — 2.18m (→ 5th place)

Men's discus throw

- Nikolay Vikhor

- Qualification — 57.50m (→ did not advance, 21st place)

Men's 20 km race walk

- Vladimir Golubnichiy — 1:29:24 (→ 7th place)
- Otto Barch — 1:31:12 (→ 13th place)
- Viktor Semyonov — 1:31:59 (→ 15th place)

Women's shot put

- Nadezhda Chizhova

- Final — 20.96 m (→ Silver medal)

- Svetlana Krachevskaya

- Final — 18.36 m (→ 9th place)

- Faina Melnik

- Final — 18.07 m (→ 10th place)

Women's javelin throw

- Svetlana Babich

- Qualifying round — 56.82 m
- Final — 59.42 m (→ 6th place)

== Basketball ==
Men's team competition

- Preliminary round (group A):

- Defeated Mexico (120–77)
- Defeated Australia (93–77)
- Defeated Canada (108–85)
- Defeated Japan (123–69)
- Defeated Cuba (98–72)

- Semifinals:

- Lost to Yugoslavia (84–89)

- Bronze medal match:

- Defeated Canada (100–72) → Bronze medal

- Team roster

- Vladimir Arzamaskov
- Aleksandr Salnikov
- Valery Miloserdov
- Alzhan Zharmukhamedov
- Andrei Makeev
- Ivan Edeshko
- Sergei Belov
- Vladimir Tkachenko
- Anatoly Myshkin
- Mikheil Korkia
- Aleksandr Belov
- Vladimir Zhigily

- Head coach: Vladimir Kondrashin

Women's team competition

- Team roster

- Angelė Rupšienė
- Tatiana Zakharova-Nadirova
- Raisa Kurvyakova
- Olga Barisheva
- Tatiana Ovechkina
- Nadezhda Shuvayena
- Uljana Semjonova
- Nadezhda Zakharova
- Nelly Feriabnikova
- Olga Sukharnova
- Tamara Dauinene
- Natalya Kilmova

- Head coach: Lydia Alexeeva

== Boxing ==
Men's light flyweight (– 48 kg)

- Aleksandr Tkachenko
  1. First round — defeated Eleoncio Mercedes (DOM), RSC-1
  2. Second round — lost to Payao Pooltarat (THA), 2:3

Men's flyweight (– 51 kg)

- David Torosyan
  1. First round — bye
  2. Second round — defeated Hassen Sheriff (ETH), walkover
  3. Third round — defeated Giovanni Camputaro (ITA), RSC-2
  4. Quarterfinal — defeated Jong Jo-Ung (PRK), 5:0
  5. Semifinal — lost to Ramón Duvalón (CUB), DSQ-2 → Bronze Medal

== Cycling ==
Twelve cyclists represented the Soviet Union in 1976.

Individual road race

- Nikolay Gorelov — 4:47:23 (→ 5th place)
- Aleksandr Averin — 4:49:01 (→ 17th place)
- Valery Chaplygin — 4:49:01 (→ 39th place)
- Aavo Pikkuus — 4:54:49 (→ 44th place)

Team time trial

- Anatoly Chukanov
- Valery Chaplygin
- Vladimir Kaminsky
- Aavo Pikkuus

Sprint

- Sergey Kravtsov — 7th place

1000m time trial

- Eduard Rapp — DSQ (→ 30th place)

Individual pursuit

- Vladimir Osokin — 4th place

Team pursuit

- Vladimir Osokin
- Aleksandr Perov
- Vitaly Petrakov
- Viktor Sokolov

== Fencing ==
18 fencers, 13 men and 5 women, represented the Soviet Union in 1976. They finished top of the fencing medal table with a total of seven medals, including three gold and a clean-sweep in the individual men's sabre event.

Men's foil

- Aleksandr Romankov
- Vasyl Stankovych
- Vladimir Denisov

Men's team foil

- Sabirzhan Ruziyev, Aleksandr Romankov, Vladimir Denisov, Vasyl Stankovych

Men's épée

- Boris Lukomsky
- Aleksandr Bykov
- Aleksandr Abushakhmetov

Men's team épée

- Aleksandr Abushakhmetov, Viktor Modzalevsky, Vasyl Stankovych, Aleksandr Bykov, Boris Lukomsky

Men's sabre

- Viktor Krovopuskov
- Vladimir Nazlymov
- Viktor Sidyak

Men's team sabre

- Viktor Sidyak, Vladimir Nazlymov, Viktor Krovopuskov, Mikhail Burtsev, Eduard Vinokurov

Women's foil

- Yelena Novikova-Belova
- Valentina Sidorova
- Olga Knyazeva

Women's team foil

- Yelena Novikova-Belova, Valentina Sidorova, Olga Knyazeva, Nailya Gilyazova, Valentina Nikonova

== Modern pentathlon ==
Three male pentathletes represented the Soviet Union in 1976. Pavel Lednyov won a silver medal in the individual event.

Individual

- Pavel Lednyov
- Boris Mosolov
- Borys Onyshchenko

Team

- Pavel Lednyov
- Boris Mosolov
- Borys Onyshchenko

== Rowing ==
The Soviet Union had 31 male and 24 female rowers participate in all 14 rowing events in 1976.

Men's competition
Men's single sculls

- Mykola Dovhan

Men's double sculls

- Evgeni Barbakov
- Gennadi Korshikov

Men's coxless pair

- Gennadi Kinko
- Tiit Helmja

Men's coxed pair

- Dmitry Bekhterev
- Yuriy Shurkalov
- Yuriy Lorentsson (cox)

Men's quadruple sculls

- Yevgeniy Duleyev
- Yuriy Yakimov
- Aivars Lazdenieks
- Vytautas Butkus

Men's coxless four

- Raul Arnemann
- Nikolay Kuznetsov
- Valeriy Dolinin
- Anushavan Gassan-Dzhalalov

Men's coxed four

- Vladimir Eshinov
- Nikolay Ivanov (rower)
- Mikhail Kuznetsov (semi-final and final)
- Aleksandr Klepikov
- Aleksandr Lukyanov (cox)
- Aleksandr Sema (heat 1)

Men's eight

- Aleksandr Shitov
- Antanas Čikotas
- Vasily Potapov
- Aleksandr Plyushkin
- Anatoly Nemtyryov
- Igor Konnov
- Anatoly Ivanov
- Vladimir Vasilyev
- Vladimir Zharov (cox)

Women's competition
Women's single sculls

- Yelena Antonova

Women's double sculls

- Eleonora Kaminskaitė
- Genovaitė Ramoškienė

Women's coxless pair

- Nataliya Horodilova
- Hanna Karnaushenko

Women's coxed four

- Nadezhda Sevostyanova
- Lyudmila Krokhina
- Galina Mishenina
- Anna Pasokha
- Lidiya Krylova (cox)

Women's quadruple sculls

- Anna Kondrachina
- Mira Bryunina
- Larisa Popova
- Galina Yermolayeva
- Nadezhda Chernyshyova (cox)

Women's eight

- Lyubov Talalaeva
- Nadezhda Roshchina
- Klavdija Koženkova
- Olena Zubko
- Olha Kolkova
- Nelli Tarakanova
- Nadiya Rozhon
- Olha Huzenko
- Olha Puhovska (cox)

== Volleyball ==
Men's team competition

- Preliminary round (group B)

- Defeated Italy (3–0)
- Defeated Brazil (3–0)
- Defeated Japan (3–0)

- Semifinals

- Defeated Cuba (3–0)

- Final

- Lost to Poland (2–3) → Silver medal

- Team roster

- Anatoly Polyshuk
- Vyaschelav Zaitsev
- Efim Chulak
- Vladimir Dorohov
- Aleksandr Ermilov
- Pavel Selivanov
- Oleg Moliboga
- Vladimir Kondra
- Yuri Starunski
- Vladimir Chernyshev
- Vladimir Ulanov
- Aleksandr Savin
- Yuri Chesnokov

- Head coach: Yuri Chesnokov

Women's team competition

- Preliminary round (Group B)

- Defeated South Korea (3–1)
- Defeated Cuba (3–1)
- Defeated East Germany (3–2)

- Semifinals

- Defeated Hungary (3–0)

- Final

- Lost to Japan (0–3) → Silver medal

- Team roster

- Anna Rostova
- Lyudmila Shetinina
- Lilia Osadchaya
- Natalya Kushnyr
- Olga Kozakova
- Nina Smoleeva
- Ljubov Rudovskaya
- Larissa Bergen
- Inna Ryskal
- Lyudmila Chernysheva
- Zoya Ilusova
- Nina Muradyan

- Head coach: Givi Ahvlediani

== Water polo ==
Men's team competition

- Team roster

- Aleksey Barkalov
- Aleksandr Dolgushin
- Aleksandr Dreval
- Aleksandr Kabanov
- Aleksandr Zakharov
- Anatoly Klebanov
- Nikolay Melnikov
- Nugzar Mshvenyeradze
- Sergey Kotenko
- Vitaly Romanchuk
- Vladimir Iselidze

- Head coach: Anatoly Blumental

== Medals by republic ==
In the following table for team events number of team representatives, who received medals are counted, not "one medal for all the team", as usual. Because there were people from different republics in one team.

Rank	Republic	Gold	Silver	Bronze	Total
1	Russian SFSR	60	56	40	156
2	Ukrainian SSR	27	22	22	71
3	Byelorussian SSR	7	5	5	17
4	Kazakh SSR	7	2	0	9
5	Georgian SSR	3	1	2	6
6	Lithuanian SSR	2	2	3	7
7	Latvian SSR	2	2	2	6
8	Azerbaijan SSR	2	1	0	3
9	Armenian SSR	1	3	1	5
10	Estonian SSR	1	0	0	1
11	Uzbek SSR	0	1	1	2
12	Moldavian SSR	0	1	0	1
13	Tajik SSR	0	0	1	1
Totals (13 entries)		112	96	77	285

== Top 5 sports societies ==
In the following table for team events number of team representatives, who received medals are counted, not "one medal for all the team", as usual. Because there were people from different sports societies in one team.

Pos	Sports society	Gold	Silver	Bronze	Total
1	VSS Spartak	24	12	9	45
2	Armed Forces	22	22	15	59
3	VSS Burevestnik	22	13	5	40
4	Dynamo	20	32	26	78
5	VSS Trud	8	4	4	16

== Sources ==
- Khavin, Boris (1979). All about Olympic Games (in Russian) (2nd ed.). Moscow: Fizkultura i sport. – for medal stats by republic and by sports society
