= Rowing at the 1976 Summer Olympics =

Rowing at the Games of the XXI Olympiad
- Venue: Olympic Basin at Notre Dame Island
- Dates: 18–25 July 1976
- Competitors: 593 (388 men, 205 women) from 31 nations

Rowing at the 1976 Summer Olympics in Montreal featured races in 14 events, all held at the rowing basin on Notre Dame Island. Women's events held at 1000 m debuted (they would be lengthened to the men's events of 2000 m at the 1988 Summer Olympics in Seoul).

There was a desire by the IOC's program commission to reduce the number of competitors and a number of recommendations were put to the IOC's executive board on 23 February 1973, which were all accepted. Rowing was the only sport where the number of competitors was increased, and women were admitted for the first time in Olympic history. The quadruple sculls events were introduced at this Olympics, without coxswain for men and with coxswain for women.

== Participating nations ==
A total of 593 rowers from 31 nations competed at the Montreal Games:

- Argentina (10)
- Australia (13)
- Austria (3)
- Belgium (7)
- Brazil (7)
- Bulgaria (33)
- Canada (46)
- Cuba (14)
- Czechoslovakia (34)
- Denmark (7)
- East Germany (54)
- Finland (7)
- France (17)
- Great Britain (31)
- Hungary (8)
- Ireland (10)
- Italy (15)
- Japan (9)
- Mexico (1)
- Netherlands (24)
- New Zealand (18)
- Norway (14)
- Poland (22)
- Romania (21)
- Soviet Union (55)
- Sweden (3)
- Switzerland (4)
- United States (54)
- Uruguay (1)
- West Germany (44)
- Yugoslavia (7)

== Medal table ==
Rank	Nation	Gold	Silver	Bronze	Total
1	East Germany	9	3	2	14
2	Bulgaria	2	1	0	3
3	Soviet Union	1	4	4	9
4	Norway	1	1	0	2
5	Finland	1	0	0	1
6	United States	0	2	1	3
7	Great Britain	0	2	0	2
8	West Germany	0	1	3	4
9	Czechoslovakia	0	0	2	2
10	New Zealand	0	0	1	1
10	Romania	0	0	1	1
Totals (11 entries)		14	14	14	42

== Medal summary ==
=== Men's events ===
Games	Gold	Silver	Bronze
Single sculls	Pertti Karppinen; Finland	Peter-Michael Kolbe; West Germany	Joachim Dreifke; East Germany
Double sculls	Frank Hansen and Alf Hansen; Norway	Chris Baillieu and Michael Hart; Great Britain	Jürgen Bertow and Uli Schmied; East Germany
Quadruple sculls (coxless)	East Germany; Wolfgang Güldenpfennig; Rüdiger Reiche; Karl-Heinz Bußert; Michael Wolfgramm	Soviet Union; Yevgeniy Duleyev; Yuriy Yakimov; Aivars Lazdenieks; Vytautas Butkus	Czechoslovakia; Jaroslav Hellebrand; Václav Vochoska; Zdeněk Pecka; Vladek Lacina
Coxless pairs	Bernd Landvoigt and Jörg Landvoigt; East Germany	Calvin Coffey and Mike Staines; United States	Peter van Roye and Thomas Strauß; West Germany
Coxed pairs	East Germany; Harald Jährling; Friedrich-Wilhelm Ulrich; Georg Spohr	Soviet Union; Dmitry Bekhterev; Yuriy Shurkalov; Yuriy Lorentsson	Czechoslovakia; Oldřich Svojanovský; Pavel Svojanovský; Ludvík Vébr
Coxless fours	East Germany; Siegfried Brietzke; Andreas Decker; Stefan Semmler; Wolfgang Mager	Norway; Ole Nafstad; Arne Bergodd; Finn Tveter; Rolf Andreassen	Soviet Union; Raul Arnemann; Nikolay Kuznetsov; Valeriy Dolinin; Anushavan Gassan-Dzhalalov
Coxed four	Soviet Union; Vladimir Eshinov; Nikolay Ivanov; Mikhail Kuznetsov; Aleksandr Klepikov; Aleksandr Lukyanov (cox); Aleksandr Sema	East Germany; Andreas Schulz; Rüdiger Kunze; Walter Dießner; Ullrich Dießner; Johannes Thomas (cox)	West Germany; Hans-Johann Färber; Ralph Kubail; Siegfried Fricke; Peter Niehusen; Hartmut Wenzel (cox)
Eights	East Germany; Bernd Baumgart; Gottfried Döhn; Werner Klatt; Hans-Joachim Lück; Dieter Wendisch; Roland Kostulski; Ulrich Karnatz; Karl-Heinz Prudöhl; Karl-Heinz Danielowski	Great Britain; Richard Lester; John Yallop; Timothy Crooks; Hugh Matheson; David Maxwell; Jim Clark; Frederick Smallbone; Lenny Robertson; Patrick Sweeney	New Zealand; Ivan Sutherland; Trevor Coker; Peter Dignan; Lindsay Wilson; Joe Earl; Dave Rodger; Alec McLean; Tony Hurt; Simon Dickie

=== Women's events ===
Games	Gold	Silver	Bronze
Single scull	Christine Scheiblich; East Germany	Joan Lind; United States	Yelena Antonova; Soviet Union
Double scull	Svetla Otsetova and Zdravka Yordanova; Bulgaria	Sabine Jahn and Petra Boesler; East Germany	Eleonora Kaminskaitė and Genovaitė Ramoškienė; Soviet Union
Quadruple scull (coxed)	East Germany; Anke Borchmann; Jutta Lau; Viola Poley; Roswietha Zobelt; Liane Weigelt	Soviet Union; Anna Kondrashina; Mira Bryunina; Larisa Alexandrova; Galina Ermolaeva; Nadezhda Chernyshova	Romania; Ioana Tudoran; Maria Micșa; Felicia Afrăsiloaie; Elisabeta Lazăr; Elena Giurcă
Coxless pair	Siyka Kelbecheva and Stoyanka Gruycheva; Bulgaria	Angelika Noack and Sabine Dähne; East Germany	Edith Eckbauer and Thea Einöder; West Germany
Coxed four	East Germany; Karin Metze; Bianka Schwede; Gabriele Lohs; Andrea Kurth; Sabine Heß	Bulgaria; Ginka Gyurova; Lilyana Vaseva; Reni Yordanova; Mariyka Modeva; Kapka Georgieva	Soviet Union; Nadezhda Sevostyanova; Lyudmila Krokhina; Galina Mishenina; Anna Pasokha; Lidiya Krylova
Eight	East Germany; Viola Goretzki; Christiane Knetsch; Ilona Richter; Brigitte Ahrenholz; Monika Kallies; Henrietta Ebert; Helma Lehmann; Irina Müller; Marina Wilke	Soviet Union; Lyubov Talalaeva; Nadezhda Roshchina; Klavdija Koženkova; Olena Zubko; Olha Kolkova; Nelli Tarakanova; Nadiya Rozhon; Olha Huzenko; Olha Puhovska	United States; Jackie Zoch; Anita DeFrantz; Carie Graves; Marion Greig; Anne Warner; Peggy McCarthy; Carol Brown; Gail Ricketson; Lynn Silliman
