= Rowing at the 1976 Summer Olympics – Women's eight =

Women's eight at the Games of the XXI Olympiad
- Date: 19–24 July
- Competitors: 72 from 8 nations

Medalists
1st place, gold medalist(s)		Viola Goretzki; Christiane Knetsch; Ilona Richter; Brigitte Ahrenholz; Monika Kallies; Henrietta Ebert; Helma Lehmann; Irina Müller; Marina Wilke	East Germany
2nd place, silver medalist(s)		Lyubov Talalaeva; Nadezhda Roshchina; Klavdija Koženkova; Olena Zubko; Olha Kolkova; Nelli Tarakanova; Nadiya Rozhon; Olha Huzenko; Olha Puhovska	Soviet Union
3rd place, bronze medalist(s)		Jackie Zoch; Anita DeFrantz; Carie Graves; Marion Greig; Anne Warner; Peggy McCarthy; Carol Brown; Gail Ricketson; Lynn Silliman	United States

The women's eight competition at the 1976 Summer Olympics took place at Notre Dame Island Olympic Basin, Canada. It was the first time the event was contested for women.

== Competition format ==
The competition consisted of two main rounds (heats and finals) as well as a repechage. The 8 boats were divided into two heats for the first round, with 4 boats in each heat. The winner of each heat advanced directly to the "A" final (1st through 6th place). The remaining 6 boats were placed in the repechage. A single repechage heat was held. The top 4 boats in the repechage went to the "A" final as well. The remaining 2 boats (5th and 6th place in the repechage) competed in the "B" final for 7th and 8th place.

All races were over a 1,000 metre course.

== Results ==
=== Heats ===
==== Heat 1 ====
Rank	Rowers	Coxswain	Nation	Time	Notes
1	Olha Huzenko; Olha Kolkova; Klavdija Koženkova; Nadezhda Roshchina; Nadiya Rozhon; Lyubov Talalaeva; Nelli Tarakanova; Olena Zubko	Olha Puhovska	Soviet Union	3:00.19	QA
2	Elena Avram Marioara Constantin; Aurelia Marinescu; Georgeta Militaru-Mașca; Iuliana Munteanu; Elena Oprea; Florica Petcu-Dospinescu; Filigonia Tol	Aneta Matei	Romania	3:01.80	R
3	Susan Antoft; Gail Cort; Mazina Delure; Carol Eastmore; Nancy Higgins; Christine Neuland; Wendy Pullan; Rhonda Ross	Illoana Smith	Canada	3:02.27	R
4	Eva Dick; Isolde Eisele; Erika Endriss; Hiltrud Gürtler; Birgit Kiesow; Waltraud Roick; Marianne Weber; Monika Zipplies	Ingrid Huhn-Wagner	West Germany	3:04.14	R

==== Heat 2 ====
Rank	Rowers	Coxswain	Nation	Time	Notes
1	Brigitte Ahrenholz; Henrietta Ebert; Viola Goretzki; Monika Kallies; Christiane Knetsch; Helma Lehmann; Irina Müller; Ilona Richter	Marina Wilke	East Germany	3:01.20	QA
2	Carol Brown; Anita DeFrantz; Carie Graves; Marion Greig; Peggy McCarthy; Gail Ricketson; Anne Warner; Jackie Zoch	Lynn Silliman	United States	3:05.52	R
3	Anna Brandysiewicz; Róża Data; Mieczysława Franczyk; Aleksandra Kaczyńska; Danuta Konkalec; Bogusława Kozłowska-Tomasiak; Maria Stadnicka; Barbara Wenta-Wojciechowska	Dorota Zdanowska	Poland	3:06.67	R
4	Karin Abma; Joke Dierdorp; Barbara de Jong; Maria Kusters-ten Beitel; Liesbeth Pascal-de Graaff; Marleen van Rij; Annette Schortinghuis-Poelenije; Loes Schutte	Evelien Koogje	Netherlands	3:06.78	R

=== Repechage ===
Rank	Rowers	Coxswain	Nation	Time	Notes
1	Carol Brown; Anita DeFrantz; Carie Graves; Marion Greig; Peggy McCarthy; Gail Ricketson; Anne Warner; Jackie Zoch	Lynn Silliman	United States	3:13.26	QA
2	Elena Avram Marioara Constantin; Aurelia Marinescu; Georgeta Militaru-Mașca; Iuliana Munteanu; Elena Oprea; Florica Petcu-Dospinescu; Filigonia Tol	Aneta Matei	Romania	3:14.25	QA
3	Eva Dick; Isolde Eisele; Erika Endriss; Hiltrud Gürtler; Birgit Kiesow; Waltraud Roick; Marianne Weber; Monika Zipplies	Ingrid Huhn-Wagner	West Germany	3:15.16	QA
4	Susan Antoft; Gail Cort; Mazina Delure; Carol Eastmore; Nancy Higgins; Christine Neuland; Wendy Pullan; Rhonda Ross	Illoana Smith	Canada	3:16.44	QA
5	Anna Brandysiewicz; Róża Data; Mieczysława Franczyk; Aleksandra Kaczyńska; Danuta Konkalec; Bogusława Kozłowska-Tomasiak; Maria Stadnicka; Barbara Wenta-Wojciechowska	Dorota Zdanowska	Poland	3:18.18	QB
6	Karin Abma; Joke Dierdorp; Barbara de Jong; Maria Kusters-ten Beitel; Liesbeth Pascal-de Graaff; Marleen van Rij; Annette Schortinghuis-Poelenije; Loes Schutte	Evelien Koogje	Netherlands	3:21.44	QB

=== Finals ===
==== Final B ====
Rank	Rowers	Coxswain	Nation	Time
7	Anna Brandysiewicz; Róża Data; Mieczysława Franczyk; Aleksandra Kaczyńska; Danuta Konkalec; Bogusława Kozłowska-Tomasiak; Maria Stadnicka; Barbara Wenta-Wojciechowska	Dorota Zdanowska	Poland	3:32.48
8	Karin Abma; Joke Dierdorp; Barbara de Jong; Maria Kusters-ten Beitel; Liesbeth Pascal-de Graaff; Marleen van Rij; Annette Schortinghuis-Poelenije; Loes Schutte	Evelien Koogje	Netherlands	3:35.87

==== Final A ====
Rank	Rowers	Coxswain	Nation	Time
1st place, gold medalist(s)	Brigitte Ahrenholz; Henrietta Ebert; Viola Goretzki; Monika Kallies; Christiane Knetsch; Helma Lehmann; Irina Müller; Ilona Richter	Marina Wilke	East Germany	3:33.32
2nd place, silver medalist(s)	Olha Huzenko; Olha Kolkova; Klavdija Koženkova; Nadezhda Roshchina; Nadiya Rozhon; Lyubov Talalaeva; Nelli Tarakanova; Olena Zubko	Olha Puhovska	Soviet Union	3:36.17
3rd place, bronze medalist(s)	Carol Brown; Anita DeFrantz; Carie Graves; Marion Greig; Peggy McCarthy; Gail Ricketson; Anne Warner; Jackie Zoch	Lynn Silliman	United States	3:38.68
4	Susan Antoft; Gail Cort; Mazina Delure; Carol Eastmore; Nancy Higgins; Christine Neuland; Wendy Pullan; Rhonda Ross	Illoana Smith	Canada	3:39.52
5	Eva Dick; Isolde Eisele; Erika Endriss; Hiltrud Gürtler; Birgit Kiesow; Waltraud Roick; Marianne Weber; Monika Zipplies	Ingrid Huhn-Wagner	West Germany	3:41.06
6	Elena Avram Marioara Constantin; Aurelia Marinescu; Georgeta Militaru-Mașca; Iuliana Munteanu; Elena Oprea; Florica Petcu-Dospinescu; Filigonia Tol	Aneta Matei	Romania	3:44.79

== Final classification ==
Rank	Rowers	Country
1st place, gold medalist(s)	Viola Goretzki; Christiane Knetsch; Ilona Richter; Brigitte Ahrenholz; Monika Kallies; Henrietta Ebert; Helma Lehmann; Irina Müller; Marina Wilke	East Germany
2nd place, silver medalist(s)	Lyubov Talalaeva; Nadezhda Roshchina; Klavdija Koženkova; Olena Zubko; Olha Kolkova; Nelli Tarakanova; Nadiya Rozhon; Olha Huzenko; Olha Puhovska	Soviet Union
3rd place, bronze medalist(s)	Jackie Zoch; Anita DeFrantz; Carie Graves; Marion Greig; Anne Warner; Peggy McCarthy; Carol Brown; Gail Ricketson; Lynn Silliman	United States
4	Carol Eastmore; Rhonda Ross; Nancy Higgins; Mazina Delure; Susan Antoft; Wendy Pullan; Christine Neuland; Gail Cort; Illoana Smith	Canada
5	Waltraud Roick; Erika Endriss; Monika Zipplies; Birgit Kiesow; Hiltrud Gürtler; Isolde Eisele; Marianne Weber; Eva Dick; Ingrid Huhn-Wagner	West Germany
6	Elena Oprea; Florica Petcu-Dospinescu; Filigonia Tol; Aurelia Marinescu; Georgeta Militaru-Mașca; Iuliana Munteanu; Elena Avram; Marioara Constantin; Aneta Matei	Romania
7	Anna Brandysiewicz; Bogusława Kozłowska-Tomasiak; Barbara Wenta-Wojciechowska; Danuta Konkalec; Róża Data; Mieczysława Franczyk; Maria Stadnicka; Aleksandra Kaczyńska; Dorota Zdanowska	Poland
8	Karin Abma; Joke Dierdorp; Barbara de Jong; Annette Schortinghuis-Poelenije; Marleen van Rij; Maria Kusters-ten Beitel; Liesbeth Pascal-de Graaff; Loes Schutte; Evelien Koogje	Netherlands
