= Netherlands at the 1976 Summer Olympics =

- Flag of the Netherlands
- IOC code: NED (HOL used at these Games)
- NOC: Dutch Olympic Committee

in Montreal
- Competitors: 108 (72 men, 36 women) in 11 sports
- Flag bearer: André Bolhuis
- Medals Ranked 29th: Gold 0 Silver 2 Bronze 3 Total 5

Summer Olympics appearances (overview)
- 1900; 1904; 1908; 1912; 1920; 1924; 1928; 1932; 1936; 1948; 1952; 1956; 1960; 1964; 1968; 1972; 1976; 1980; 1984; 1988; 1992; 1996; 2000; 2004; 2008; 2012; 2016; 2020; 2024

Other related appearances
- 1906 Intercalated Games

The Netherlands competed at the 1976 Summer Olympics in Montreal, Quebec, Canada. 108 competitors, 72 men and 36 women, took part in 58 events in 11 sports.

== Medalists ==
The Netherlands finished in 29th position in the final medal rankings, with two silver medals and three bronze medals.

=== Silver ===
- Herman Ponsteen – Cycling, Men's 4000m Individual Pursuit
- Eric Swinkels – Shooting, Men's Skeet Shooting

=== Bronze ===
- Enith Brigitha – Swimming, Women's 100m Freestyle
- Enith Brigitha – Swimming, Women's 200m Freestyle
- Alex Boegschoten, Ton Buunk, Piet de Zwarte, Andy Hoepelman, Evert Kroon, Nico Landeweerd, Hans Smits, Gijze Stroboer, Rik Toonen, Hans van Zeeland, and Jan Evert Veer – Water polo, Men's Team Competition

== Athletics ==
Men's 800 metres

- Evert Hoving

- Heat – 1:48.99 (→ did not advance)

Men's 10.000 metres

- Jos Hermens

- Heat – 28:16.07
- Final – 28:25.04 (→ 10th place)

Men's Marathon

- Jos Hermens – 2:19:48 (→ 25th place)

== Cycling ==
Twelve cyclists represented the Netherlands in 1976.

Individual road race

- Arie Hassink – 4:49:01 (→ 25th place)
- Leo van Vliet – 4:49:01 (→ 40th place)
- Ad Tak – 5:00:19 (→ 50th place)
- Frits Schür – did not finish (→ no ranking)

Team time trial

- Arie Hassink
- Frits Pirard
- Adri van Houwelingen
- Fons van Katwijk

Sprint

- Sjaak Pieters – 14th place

Individual pursuit

- Herman Ponsteen – Silver Medal

Team pursuit

- Gerrit Möhlmann
- Peter Nieuwenhuis
- Herman Ponsteen
- Gerrie Slot

== Hockey ==
=== Men's team competition ===
- Preliminary round (group A)

- Defeated India (3-1)
- Defeated Malaysia (2-0)
- Defeated Australia (2-1)
- Defeated Argentina (1-0)
- Defeated Canada (3-1)

- Semi Finals

- Lost to Australia (1-2)

- Bronze Medal Match

- Lost to Pakistan (2-3) → Fourth place

- Team roster

- Maarten Sikking (gk)
- André Bolhuis (captain)
- Tim Steens
- Geert van Eijk
- Theodoor Doyer
- Coen Kranenberg
- Rob Toft (gk)
- Wouter Leefers
- Hans Jorritsma
- Hans Kruize
- Jan Albers
- Paul Litjens
- Imbert Jebbink
- Ron Steens
- Bart Taminiau
- Wouter Kan

- Head coach: Wim van Heumen

== Rowing ==
Men's coxless pairs

- Jan van der Horst, Willem Boeschoten (10th)

Men's coxed fours

- Adrie Klem, Evert Kroes, Martin Baltus, Gert Jan van Woudenberg, Jos Ruijs (10th)

Women's single sculls

- Ingrid Munneke-Dusseldorp (5th)

Women's double sculls

- Andrea Vissers, Helie Klaasse (7th)

Women's coxed fours

- Liesbeth Vosmaer-de Bruin, Hette Borrias, Myriam van Rooyen-Steenman, Ans Gravesteijn, Monique Pronk (5th)

Women's eights

- Karin Abma, Joke Dierdorp, Barbara de Jong, Annette Schortinghuis-Poelenije, Marleen van Rij, Maria Kusters-ten Beitel, Liesbeth Pascal-de Graaff, Loes Schutte, Evelien Koogje (8th)

== Water polo ==
=== Men's team competition ===
- Preliminary round (group B)

- Defeated Mexico (5-3)
- Defeated Soviet Union (3-2)
- Defeated Romania (6-5)

- Final Round

- Defeated West Germany (3-2)
- Tied with Romania (4-4)
- Lost to Hungary (3-5)
- Defeated Yugoslavia (5-3)
- Tied with Italy (3-3) → Bronze Medal

- Team roster

- Alex Boegschoten
- Ton Buunk
- Piet de Zwarte
- Andy Hoepelman
- Evert Kroon
- Nico Landeweerd
- Hans Smits
- Gijze Stroboer
- Rik Toonen
- Hans van Zeeland
- Jan Evert Veer
