= Liesbeth Pascal-de Graaff =

Dutch rower (born 1946)

Personal information
- Born: Louise Elisabeth de Graaff; 11 October 1946 (age 79) Arnhem, the Netherlands
- Height: 175 cm (5 ft 9 in)
- Weight: 78 kg (172 lb)

Sport
- Sport: Rowing
- Club: Nereus, Amsterdam
Medal record
Women's rowing
Representing the Netherlands
European Championships
Gold medal – first place	1973 Moscow	Coxed four

Louise Elisabeth Pascal-de Graaff (née de Graaff; born 11 October 1946) is a retired Dutch rower. In the coxed four, she won the European title in 1973 and finished fifth at the 1975 World Rowing Championships. She competed at the 1976 Summer Olympics in the women's eight, together with Karin Abma, Joke Dierdorp, Barbara de Jong, Annette Schortinghuis-Poelenije, Marleen van Rij, Maria Kusters-ten Beitel, Loes Schutte and Evelien Koogje, and finished in eighth place.
