= Tomasiak =

Tomasiak is a Polish surname. Notable people include:

- Adam Tomasiak (born 1953), Polish rower
- Bogusława Kozłowska-Tomasiak (born 1952), Polish rower
- Kacper Tomasiak (born 2007), Polish ski jumper
- Paulina Tomasiak (born 2002), Polish footballer
