= Wendy Pullan =

Wendy Pullan may refer to:

- Wendy Pullan (rower) (born 1953), Canadian rower
- Wendy Pullan (academic), scholar of architecture and urban studies
