= 1973 European Rowing Championships =

Athletic competition event

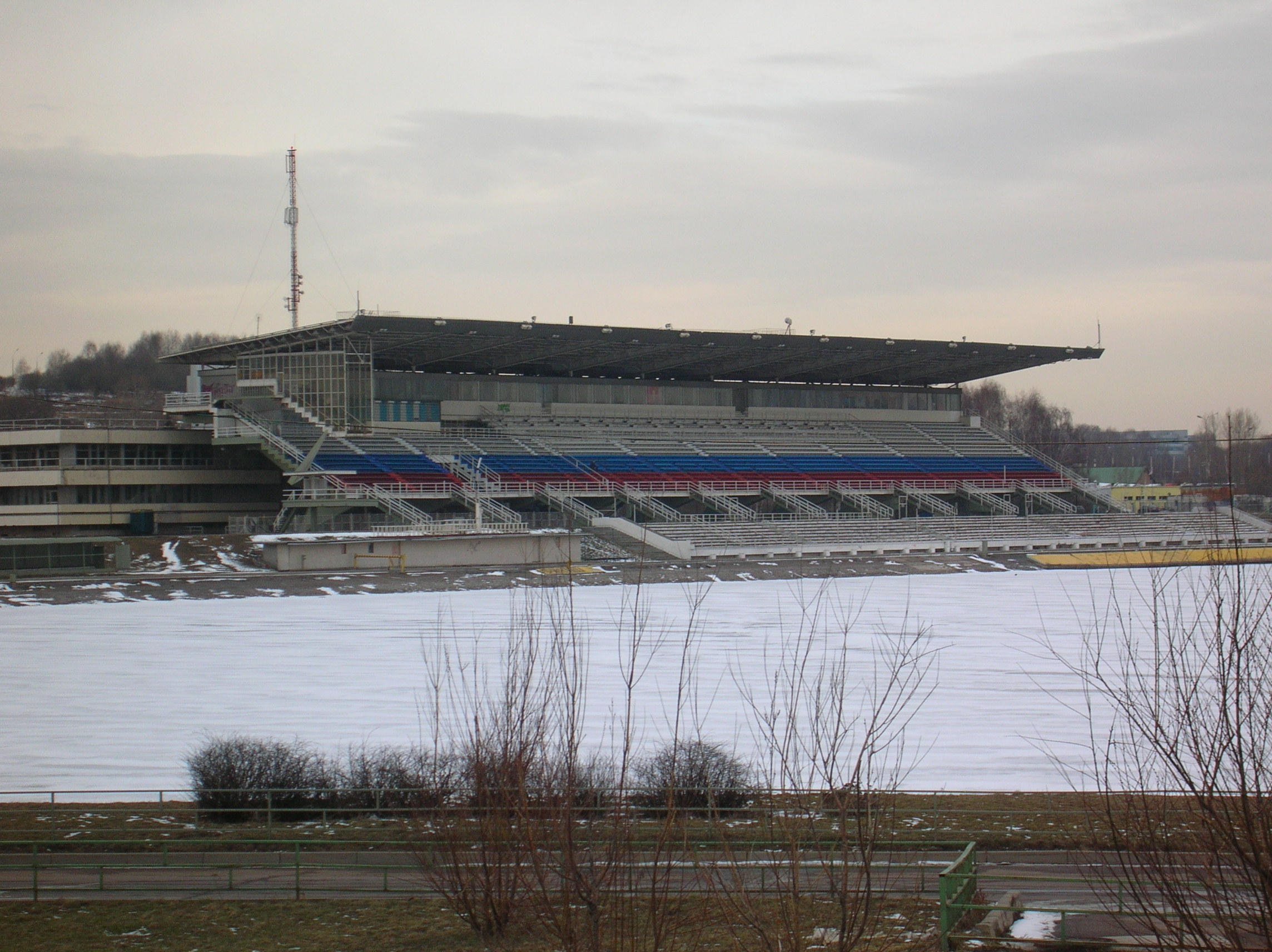
- The venue, here in 2008, was built in 1973
- Venue: Krylatskoye Rowing Canal
- Location: Moscow, Soviet Union
- Dates: 23–26 August 1973 (women); 29 August – 2 September 1973 (men)
- Nations: 18 (women); 29 (men)

The 1973 European Rowing Championships were rowing championships held at the regatta course on the Krylatskoye Rowing Canal in Moscow, Soviet Union. The competition was the first use of the venue. There were seven competitions for men and five for women. World Rowing Championships were held, up until 1974, at four-year intervals, and the European Rowing Championships were open to nations outside of Europe and had become to be regarded as quasi-world championships. From 1974 the world championships changed to an annual schedule, and the European Rowing Championships were discontinued. It was only in 2006 that the International Rowing Federation (FISA) decided to re-establish the European Rowing Championships, with the 2007 event the first regatta after the hiatus.

Women competed in Moscow from 23 to 26 August. Their event overlapped with the 1973 Summer Universiade that was also held in the city. Twenty nations nominated women to the competition, but only 18 nations had their women compete with a total of 53 boats (W1x: 14 boats; W2x: 11 boats; W4x+: 10 boats; W4+: 10 boats; W8+: 8 boats). At the time, there was an expectation that rowing for women would be included in the 1976 Olympic programme, and it was expected that women would compete at the 1974 World Rowing Championships. For that reason, East Germany had decided to put forward younger rowers so that they would have become experienced by 1976. Women competed over a distance of 1000 meters.

Men competed from 29 August to 2 September, and 29 countries representing 4 continents nominated 109 boats. Men competed over a distance of 2000 metres.

== Medal summary ==
Medallists at the 1973 European Rowing Championships were:

=== Women's events ===
Event	Gold		Silver		Bronze	
Event	Country & rowers	Time	Country & rowers	Time	Country & rowers	Time
W1x	Soviet Union; Genovaitė Ramoškienė	3:59.97	Belgium; Christine Wasterlain	4:00.36	West Germany; Edith Eckbauer	4:06.68
W2x	Soviet Union; Yelena Antonova; Olga Klinisheva	3:40.05	Netherlands; Helie Klaasse; Andrea Vissers	3:42.80	West Germany; Regine Adam; Astrid Hohl	3:43.90
W4+	Netherlands; Liesbeth de Graaff; Myriam Steenman; Hette Borrias; Liesbeth de Bruin; Yvonne Vischschraper (cox)	3:38.13	East Germany; Maria Notbohm; Sabine Dähne; Angelika Noack; Rosel Nitsche; Christa Karnath (cox)	3:38.89	Poland; Anna Karbowiak; Małgorzata Kawalska; Bogusława Tomasiak; Barbara Wojciechowska; Maria Peleszok (cox)	3:41.86
W4x+	East Germany; Sabine Jahn; Brigitte Ahrenholz; Ursula Wagner; Roswietha Reichel; Monika Kurtz (cox)	3:30.63	Romania; Elisabeta Lazăr; Maria Micșa; Mărioara Singiorzan; Teodora Boicu; Maria Ghiata (cox)	3:32.56	Soviet Union; Vera Nikolskaia; Ludmila Andreeva; Ludmila Parfenova; Vera Fiodoreva; Ludmila Arzakovskaia (cox)	3:33.55
W8+	Soviet Union; Sofia Beketova; Larissa Sotskova; Vera Alexeyeva; Olga Shvetsova; Nina FilatoVa; Nina Abramova; Valentina Rubtsova; Nina Bystrova; Nina Frolova (cox)	3:21.12	East Germany; Monika Mittenzwei; Renate Kruska; Ilona Richter; Irina Müller; Christa Staack; Helma Mähren; Henrietta Dobler; Renate Schlenzig; Sabine Brincker (cox)	3:22.58	Romania; Cornelia Neacșu; Florica Petcu; Elena Gawluk; Aurelia Marinescu; Cristel Wiener; Filigonia Toll; Viorica Lincaru; Ecaterina Trancioveanu; Aneta Matei (cox)	3:23.78

=== Men's events ===
Event	Gold		Silver		Bronze	
Event	Country & rowers	Time	Country & rowers	Time	Country & rowers	Time
M1x	West Germany; Peter-Michael Kolbe	8:02.77	Soviet Union; Vytautas Butkus	8:05.87	East Germany; Wolfgang Güldenpfennig	8:07.09
M2x	East Germany; Christof Kreuziger; Uli Schmied	7:26.95	Soviet Union; Gennadiy Korshikov; Aleksandr Timoshinin	7:33.97	Great Britain; Michael Hart; Chris Baillieu	7:41.87
M2-	Romania; Dumitru Grumezescu; Ilie Oanță	7:39.10	New Zealand; Wybo Veldman; Noel Mills	7:42.63	West Germany; Winfried Ringwald; Alois Bierl	7:43.53
M2+	Soviet Union; Nikolay Ivanov; Vladimir Eshinov; Aleksandr Lukyanov (cox)	8:09.83	East Germany; Jörg Lucke; Wolfgang Gunkel; Klaus-Dieter Neubert (cox)	8:13.42	Romania; Petre Ceapura; Ștefan Tudor; Gheorghe Gheorghiu (cox)	8:15.67
M4-	East Germany; Rul Melke; Henry Prochnow; Gottfried Döhn; Reinhard Martin	6:56.67	Soviet Union; Mindaugas Vaitkus; Beniaminas Natsevicius; Tiit Helmja; Apolinaras Grigas	7:00.55	Norway; Rolf Andreassen; Arne Bergodd; Odd Sørum; Ole Nafstad	7:01.85
M4+	Soviet Union; Gennadi Moskovski; Aleksandr Plyushkin; Vladimir Vasilyev; Anatoly Nemtyryov; Alexandr Jarov (cox)	7:08.17	East Germany; Eckhard Martens; Rolf Jobst; Reinhard Gust; Dietrich Zander; Klaus-Dieter Ludwig (cox)	7:18.20	Czechoslovakia; František Provazník; Vladimír Jánoš; Karel Neffe; Otakar Mareček; Vladimír Petříček (cox)	7:18.81
M8+	East Germany; Heinrich Mederow; Detlef Lamm; Andreas Decker; Stefan Semmler; Bernd Landvoigt; Karl-Heinz Prudöhl; Werner Klatt; Friedrich-Wilhelm Ulrich; Karl-Heinz Danielowski (cox)	6:19.02	Czechoslovakia; Jiří Stefan; Miroslav Vraštil Sr. Josef Neštický; Pavel Batěk; Václav Mls; Pavel Konvička; Petr Lakomý; Lubomír Zapletal; Jiří Pták (cox)	6:33.18	Soviet Union; Aleksandr Ryazankin; Vladimir Savelov; Aleksandr Martyshkin; Nikolay Surov; Sergey Kolyaskin; Boris Vorobyov; Givi Nikuradze; Vladimir Rikkanen; Yuriy Lorentsson (cox)	6:36.14

== Medals table ==
Rank	Nation	Gold	Silver	Bronze	Total
1	Soviet Union (URS)	5	3	2	10
2	East Germany (GDR)	4	4	1	9
3	Romania (ROU)	1	1	2	4
4	Netherlands (NED)	1	1	0	2
5	West Germany (FRG)	1	0	3	4
6	Czechoslovakia (TCH)	0	1	1	2
7	Belgium (BEL)	0	1	0	1
7	New Zealand (NZL)	0	1	0	1
9	Great Britain (GBR)	0	0	1	1
9	Norway (NOR)	0	0	1	1
9	Poland (POL)	0	0	1	1
Totals (11 entries)		12	12	12	36
