= Illoana Smith =

Canadian rower

Personal information
- Born: 13 May 1957 (age 67); Weyburn, Saskatchewan, Canada

Sport
- Sport: Rowing

Illoana Smith (born 13 May 1957) is a Canadian rowing cox. She competed in the women's eight event at the 1976 Summer Olympics.
