= Filigonia Tol =

Romanian rower

Personal information
- Nationality: Romanian
- Born: 23 March 1951 (age 74)

Sport
- Sport: Rowing

Filigonia Tol (born 23 March 1951) is a Romanian rower. She competed in two events at the 1976 Summer Olympics.
