= Danuta Konkalec =

Polish rower

Personal information
- Nationality: Polish
- Born: 7 September 1955 (age 69); Jastarnia, Poland

Sport
- Sport: Rowing

Danuta Konkalec (born 7 September 1955) is a Polish rower. She competed in the women's eight event at the 1976 Summer Olympics.
