= Aurelia Marinescu =

Romanian rower

Personal information
- Nationality: Romanian
- Born: 3 April 1954 (age 72) Bucharest, Romania

Sport
- Sport: Rowing
Medal record
Women's rowing
Representing Romania
World Championships
Bronze medal – third place	1974 Lucerne	Eight
Bronze medal – third place	1975 Nottingham	Eight
European Rowing Championships
Bronze medal – third place	1973 Moscow	Eight

Aurelia Marinescu (born 3 April 1954) is a Romanian rower. She competed in two events at the 1976 Summer Olympics.
