= Christine Wasterlain =

Belgian rower

Medal record
Women's Rowing
Representing Belgium
World Championships
Bronze medal – third place	1974 Lucerne	Single sculls
European Championships
Silver medal – second place	1973 Moscow	Single sculls

Christine Wasterlain is a Belgian rower. In 1973, she won the silver medal in rowing, single scull at the European Rowing Championships in Moscow, Russia, and in 1974 the bronze medal at the World Rowing Championships in Lucerne, Switzerland.
