= Isolde Eisele =

German rower (born 1953)

Personal information
- Nationality: German
- Born: 20 October 1953 (age 71); Esslingen am Neckar, Germany

Sport
- Sport: Rowing

Isolde Eisele (born 20 October 1953) is a German rower. She competed in the women's eight event at the 1976 Summer Olympics.
