= Erika Endriss =

German rower

Personal information
- Nationality: German
- Born: 30 August 1954 (age 70); Stuttgart, Germany

Sport
- Sport: Rowing

Erika Endriss (born 30 August 1954) is a German rower. She competed in the women's eight event at the 1976 Summer Olympics.
