= Róża Data =

Polish rower

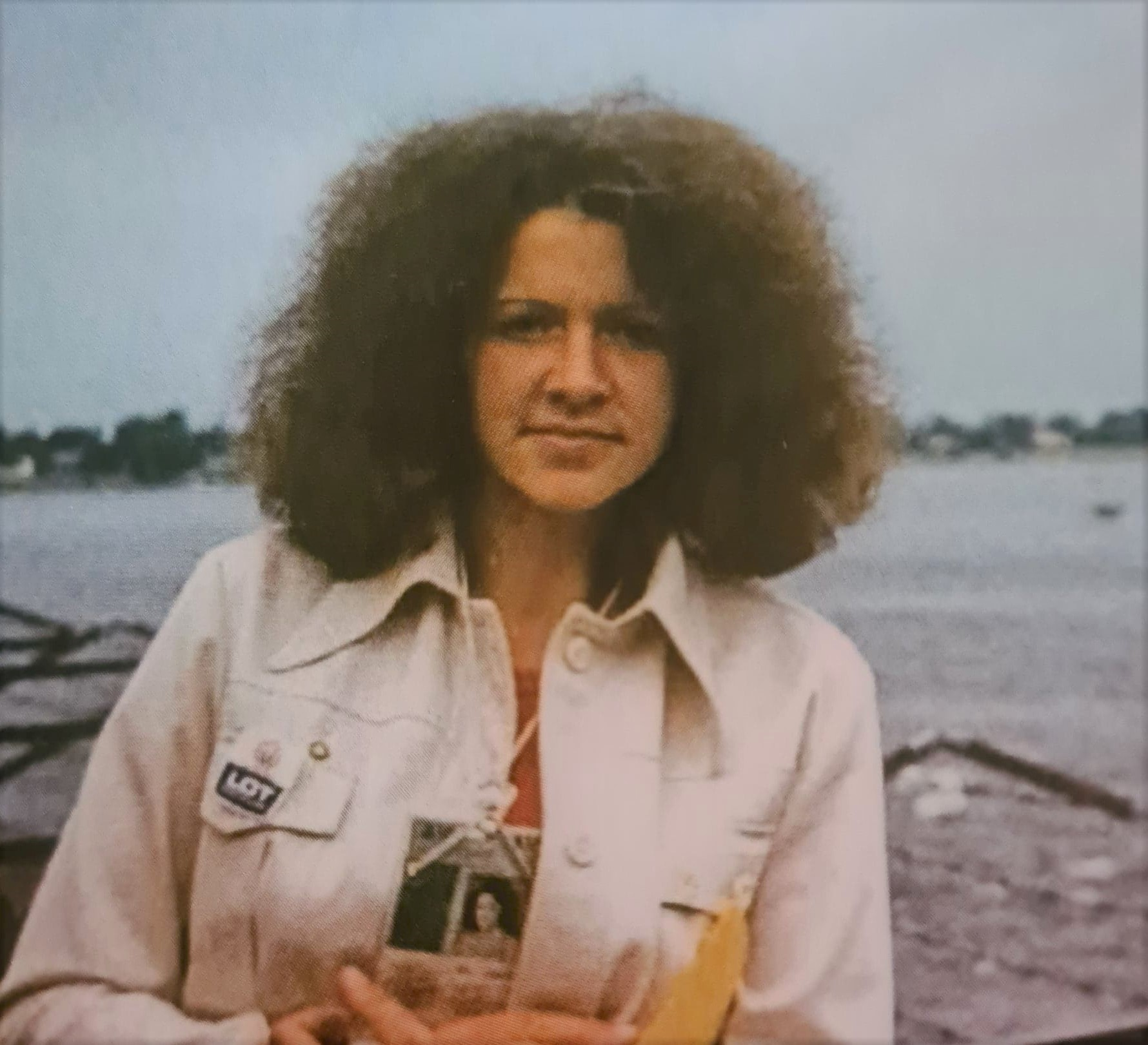

Personal information
- Nationality: Polish
- Born: 3 February 1955 (age 70); Grudziądz, Poland

Sport
- Sport: Rowing

Róża Data (born 3 February 1955) is a Polish rower. She competed in the women's eight event at the 1976 Summer Olympics.
