= Carol Eastmore =

Canadian rower

Personal information
- Born: 30 July 1952 (age 73) Toronto, Ontario, Canada

Sport
- Sport: Rowing

Carol Eastmore (born 30 July 1952) is a Canadian rower. She competed in the women's eight event at the 1976 Summer Olympics.
