= Hiltrud Gürtler =

German rower

Personal information
- Nationality: German
- Born: 12 February 1957 (age 68); Neuss, Germany

Sport
- Sport: Rowing

Hiltrud Gürtler (born 12 February 1957) is a German rower. She competed in the women's eight event at the 1976 Summer Olympics.
