= Iuliana Munteanu =

Romanian rower

Personal information
- Nationality: Romanian
- Born: 14 November 1955 (age 69); Voluntari, Romania

Sport
- Sport: Rowing

Iuliana Munteanu (born 14 November 1955) is a Romanian rower. She competed in the women's eight event at the 1976 Summer Olympics.
