= Birgit Kiesow =

German rower

Personal information
- Nationality: German
- Born: 17 January 1957 (age 68); Lübeck, Germany

Sport
- Sport: Rowing

Birgit Kiesow (born 17 January 1957) is a German rower. She competed in the women's eight event at the 1976 Summer Olympics.
