= Christine Neuland =

Canadian rower

Personal information
- Born: 9 August 1956 (age 69) Toronto, Ontario, Canada

Sport
- Sport: Rowing

Christine Neuland (born 9 August 1956) is a Canadian rower. She competed in the women's eight event at the 1976 Summer Olympics.
