= Dorota Zdanowska =

Polish rower

Personal information
- Nationality: Polish
- Born: 4 March 1954 (age 71); Kazimierz Dolny, Poland

Sport
- Sport: Rowing

Dorota Zdanowska (born 4 March 1954) is a Polish rowing cox. She competed in the women's eight event at the 1976 Summer Olympics.
