= Monika Zipplies =

German rower

Personal information
- Nationality: German
- Born: 22 March 1956 (age 69); Stuttgart, Germany

Sport
- Sport: Rowing

Monika Zipplies (born 22 March 1956) is a German rower. She competed in the women's eight event at the 1976 Summer Olympics.
