= Larisa Merk =

Russian rower (born 1971)

Medal record

Representing Russia

Olympic Games

Women's Rowing
Bronze medal – third place	2000 Sydney	quadruple sculls

Larisa Viktorovna Merk (Russian: Лариса Викторовна Мерк, born 16 March 1971 in Novosibirsk) is a Russian rower who competed for Russia in four Summer Olympics.

In 2000, she was a crew member of the Russia boat which won the bronze medal in the quadruple sculls event.
