= Reinhard Gust =

East German rower (born 1950)

Personal information
- Born: 10 December 1950 (age 75) Rostock, East Germany
- Height: 190 cm (6 ft 3 in) /
- Weight: 92 kg (203 lb)
- Spouse: Sabine Gust

Sport
- Sport: Rowing
- Club: SV Dynamo / SC Dynamo Berlin
Medal record
Men's rowing
Representing East Germany
Olympic Games
Silver medal – second place	1972 Munich	Coxed four
World Rowing Championships
Gold medal – first place	1970 St. Catharines	Eight
European Rowing Championships
Silver medal – second place	1971 Copenhagen	Eight
Silver medal – second place	1973 Moscow	Coxed four

Reinhard Gust (born 10 December 1950) is a German rower, who competed for the SC Dynamo Berlin / Sportvereinigung (SV) Dynamo. Born in Rostock, he won the medals at the international rowing competitions. He is married to fellow rower Sabine Jahn.
