= Anna Brandysiewicz =

Polish rower

Personal information
- Nationality: Polish
- Born: 6 April 1955 (age 69); Warsaw, Poland

Sport
- Sport: Rowing

Anna Brandysiewicz (born 6 April 1955) is a Polish rower. She competed in the women's eight event at the 1976 Summer Olympics.
