= Mazina Delure =

Canadian rower

Personal information
- Nationality: Canadian
- Born: 6 May 1948 (age 76); Amersfoort, Netherlands

Sport
- Sport: Rowing

Mazina Delure (born 6 May 1948) is a Canadian rower. She competed in the women's eight event at the 1976 Summer Olympics.
