= Ingrid Huhn-Wagner =

German rower

Personal information
- Nationality: German
- Born: 21 May 1948 (age 76); Hamburg, Germany

Sport
- Sport: Rowing

Ingrid Huhn-Wagner (born 21 May 1948) is a German rower. She competed in the women's eight event at the 1976 Summer Olympics.
