= Waltraud Roick =

German rower

Personal information
- Nationality: German
- Born: 23 February 1948 (age 77); Lübeck, Germany

Sport
- Sport: Rowing

Waltraud Roick (born 23 February 1948) is a German rower. She competed in the women's eight event at the 1976 Summer Olympics.
