= Barbara Wenta-Wojciechowska =

Polish rower

Personal information
- Born: 15 March 1953 (age 73) Tczew, Gdańsk Voivodeship, Polish People's Republic
- Height: 169 cm (5 ft 7 in)
- Weight: 68 kg (150 lb)

Sport
- Country: Poland
- Sport: Rowing
- Club: Unia Tczew
Medal record
Women's rowing
Representing Poland
European Championships
| Bronze medal – third place | 1973 Moscow | Coxed four |

Barbara Wenta (née Wojciechowska, born 15 March 1953) is a Polish rower. She competed in the women's eight event at the 1976 Summer Olympics.
