= Rhonda Ross =

Canadian rower

Personal information
- Nationality: Canadian
- Born: 30 October 1953 (age 72) Vancouver, British Columbia, Canada

Sport
- Sport: Rowing

Rhonda Ross (born 30 October 1953) is a Canadian rower. She competed in the women's eight event at the 1976 Summer Olympics.
