= Maria Stadnicka =

Polish rower

Personal information
- Nationality: Polish
- Born: 5 September 1951 (age 73); Warsaw, Poland

Sport
- Sport: Rowing

Maria Stadnicka (born 5 September 1951) is a Polish rower. She competed in the women's eight event at the 1976 Summer Olympics.
