= Mieczysława Franczyk =

Polish rower

Personal information
- Nationality: Polish
- Born: 1 April 1942 (age 82); Mostki, Poland

Sport
- Sport: Rowing

Mieczysława Franczyk (born 1 April 1942) is a Polish rower. She competed in the women's eight event at the 1976 Summer Olympics.
