= Marioara Constantin =

Romanian rower

Personal information
- Nationality: Romanian
- Born: 13 November 1951 (age 74)

Sport
- Sport: Rowing
Medal record
Representing Romania
European Rowing Championships
Silver medal – second place	1972 Brandenburg	Eight
Bronze medal – third place	1971 Copenhagen	Eight

Marioara Constantin (born 13 November 1951) is a Romanian rower. She competed in the women's eight event at the 1976 Summer Olympics.
