= Susan Antoft =

Canadian rower

Personal information
- Born: 30 July 1954 (age 71) Montreal, Quebec, Canada

Sport
- Sport: Rowing

Susan Antoft (born 30 July 1954) is a Canadian rower. She competed in the women's eight event at the 1976 Summer Olympics.
