= Eva Dick =

German rower

Personal information
- Nationality: German
- Born: 28 August 1956 (age 68); Saarbrücken, Germany

Sport
- Sport: Rowing

Eva Dick (born 28 August 1956) is a German rower. She competed in the women's eight event at the 1976 Summer Olympics.
