= Nancy Higgins =

Canadian rower

Personal information
- Born: 23 April 1954 (age 71) Oshawa, Ontario, Canada

Sport
- Sport: Rowing

Nancy Higgins (born 23 April 1954) is a Canadian rower. She competed in the women's eight event at the 1976 Summer Olympics.
