= Nelli Feryabnikova =

Russian basketball player (born 1949)

Medal record

Women's basketball

Representing the Soviet Union

Olympic Games
Gold medal – first place	1976 Montreal	Team competition
Gold medal – first place	1980 Moscow	Team competition

Nelli Vasilyevna Feryabnikova (Russian: Нелли Васильевна Ферябникова; born 14 May 1949), known as Nelli Feryabnikova or Nelly Feriabnikova, is a Russian former basketball player who competed in the 1976 Summer Olympics and in the 1980 Summer Olympics.
