= Raisa Kurvyakova =

Ukrainian basketball player

Medal record

Women's basketball

Representing the Soviet Union

Olympic Games
Gold medal – first place	1976 Montreal	Team competition

Raisa Kurvyakova (born 15 September 1945 in Gorno-Ulbinka, Kazakhstan) is a Ukrainian former basketball player who competed in the 1976 Summer Olympics.
