= Georgeta Militaru-Mașca =

Romanian rower (born 1954)

Personal information
- Nationality: Romanian
- Born: 14 March 1954 (age 72) Ceptura, Romania

Sport
- Sport: Rowing
Medal record
Women's rowing
Representing Romania
World Championships
Bronze medal – third place	1974 Lucerne	Eight
Bronze medal – third place	1977 Amsterdam	Coxed quad scull
Bronze medal – third place	1978 Karapiro	Coxed four

Georgeta Militaru-Mașca (born 14 March 1954) is a Romanian rower. She competed at the 1976 Summer Olympics and the 1980 Summer Olympics.
