= Aleksandra Kaczyńska =

Polish rower

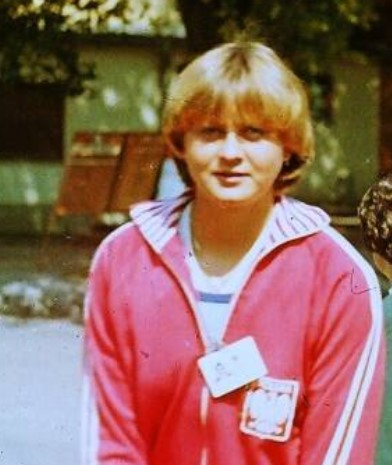
- Kaczyńska in 1979

Personal information
- Full name: Aleksandra Kaczyńska-Błoch
- Born: 2 December 1954 (age 70); Wrocław, Poland

Sport
- Country: Poland
- Sport: Rowing

Aleksandra Kaczyńska (born 2 December 1954) is a Polish rower. She competed at the 1976 Summer Olympics and the 1980 Summer Olympics.
