= Marion Greig =

American rower (born 1954)

Personal information
- Full name: Marion Ethel Greig
- Born: February 22, 1954 (age 72) Hudson, New York, U.S.
Medal record
Women's rowing
Representing United States
Olympic Games
Bronze medal – third place	1976 Montreal	Eight

Marion Ethel Greig (born February 22, 1954) is an American rower who competed in the 1976 Summer Olympics.

Greig was born in Hudson, New York. She graduated in 1976 from Cornell University.

She competed in the 1976 Summer Olympics and was a crew member of the American boat which won the bronze medal in the eights event. She rowed in the fifth seat. Greig also competed in the 1975 World Championships in the quad sculls, placing fifth.
