= Tiit Helmja =

Estonian rower (born 1945)

Personal information
- Born: 19 July 1945 (age 80) Tahkuranna, Estonia
- Height: 187 cm (6 ft 2 in)
- Weight: 86 kg (190 lb)

Sport
- Sport: Rowing
Medal record
Men's rowing
Representing the Soviet Union
European Rowing Championships
Bronze medal – third place	1971 Copenhagen	Eight
Silver medal – second place	1973 Moscow	Coxless four

Tiit Helmja (born 19 July 1945) is an Estonian rower who competed for Soviet Union at the 1968 Summer Olympics in Mexico City with the men's coxed pair where they qualified for the small final but did not start. At the 1971 European Rowing Championships in Copenhagen, he won bronze with the men's eight. At the 1973 European Rowing Championships in Moscow, he won silver with the men's coxless four.
