= Nadezhda Shuvayeva-Olkhova =

Russian basketball player

Olympic medal record

Women's basketball

Representing the Soviet Union
Gold medal – first place	1976 Montreal	Team competition
Gold medal – first place	1980 Moscow	Team competition

Nadezhda Aleksandrovna Shuvayeva-Olkhova (Russian: Надежда Александровна Шуваева-Ольхова, born 9 September 1952 in Barnaul) is a Russian former basketball player who competed in the 1976 Summer Olympics and in the 1980 Summer Olympics.
