= Olga Barysheva =

Russian basketball player (born 1954)

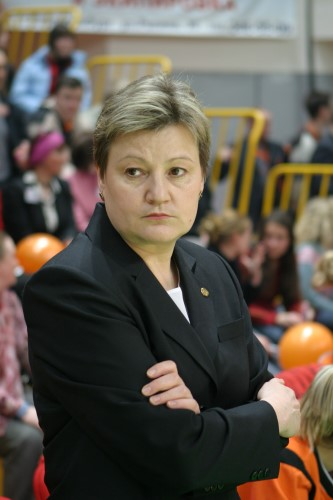
- Olga Korosteleva in 2006

Medal record

Women's basketball

Representing the Soviet Union

Olympic Games
Gold medal – first place	1976 Montreal	Team competition
Gold medal – first place	1980 Moscow	Team competition

Olga Fyodorovna Barysheva-Korostelyova (Russian: Ольга Фёдоровна Барышева-Коростелёва; born 24 August 1954) is a Russian former basketball player who competed in the 1976 Summer Olympics and in the 1980 Summer Olympics.
