= Peggy McCarthy (rower) =

American rower (born 1956)

Personal information
- Full name: Margaret Ann McCarthy
- Born: March 1, 1956 (age 70) Urbana, Illinois, U.S.
Medal record
Women's rowing
Representing the United States
Olympic Games
Bronze medal – third place	1976 Montreal	Eight

Margaret Ann "Peggy" McCarthy (born March 1, 1956), is an American rower.

== Olympian ==
She competed in the 1976 Summer Olympics and was a crew member of the American boat which won the bronze medal in the eights event. She qualified for the 1980 U.S. Olympic team but was unable to compete due to the 1980 Summer Olympics boycott. McCarthy did however receive one of 461 Congressional Gold Medals created especially for the spurned athletes.
