= Nadezhda Zakharova =

Russian basketball player

Olympic medal record

Women's basketball

Representing the Soviet Union
Gold medal – first place	1976 Montreal	Team competition

Nadezhda Dmitriyevna Zakharova (born 9 February 1945) is a Soviet and Russian former basketball player who competed in the 1976 Summer Olympics.
