= Wendy Pullan (rower) =

Canadian rower

Personal information
- Nationality: Canadian
- Born: 1 February 1953 (age 72) Vancouver, British Columbia, Canada

Sport
- Sport: Rowing

Wendy Pullan (born 1 February 1953) is a Canadian rower. She competed in the women's eight event at the 1976 Summer Olympics.
