= Vladimir Arzamaskov =

Soviet Russian basketball player

Personal information
- Born: April 7, 1951 Stalingrad, Russian SFSR, Soviet Union
- Died: November 30, 1985 (aged 34) Moscow, Soviet Union
- Listed height: 6 ft 2.8 in (1.90 m)
- Listed weight: 191 lb (87 kg)

Career information
- Playing career: 1969–1981

Career history
- 1969–1977: Spartak Leningrad
- 1977–1979: CSKA Moscow
- 1979–1981: SKA Kyiv
Medals
Men's basketball
Representing the Soviet Union
Olympic Games
Bronze medal – third place	1976 Montreal	Team competition
FIBA EuroBasket
Silver medal – second place	1977 Belgium	Team competition

Vladimir Ivanovich Arzamaskov (Владимир Иванович Арзамасков; 7 April 1951 – 30 November 1985) was a former Soviet (Russian) basketball player who competed for the Soviet Union in the 1976 Summer Olympics.

== Titles ==
- FIBA European Cup Winners' Cup: (2) (with Spartak Leningrad: 1972–73, 1974–75)
- USSR League: (3) (with Spartak Leningrad: 1974–75 & CSKA Moscow: 1977–78, 1978–79)
