= Gail Cort =

Canadian rower

Personal information
- Born: 5 August 1956 (age 69) St. Catharines, Ontario, Canada

Sport
- Sport: Rowing

Gail Cort (born 5 August 1956) is a Canadian rower. She competed at the 1976 Summer Olympics and the 1984 Summer Olympics.
