= Carol Brown (rower) =

American rower

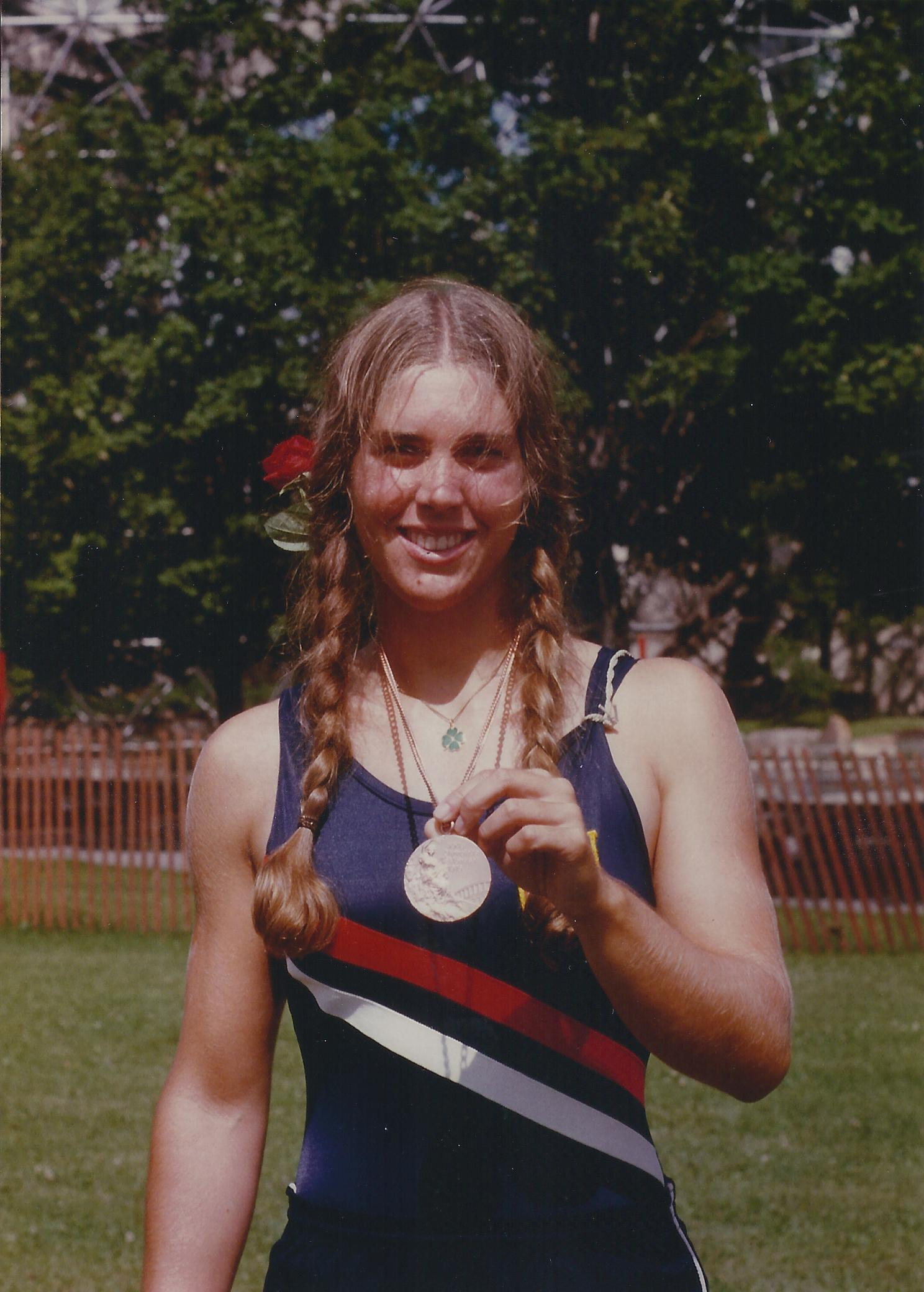
- Brown in Montreal with bronze medal, 1976

Personal information
- Full name: Carol Page Brown
- Born: April 19, 1953 (age 73) Oak Park, Illinois, U.S.
Medal record
Women's rowing
Representing the United States
Olympic Games
| Bronze medal – third place | 1976 Montreal | Eight |
World Rowing Championships
| Silver medal – second place | 1975 Nottingham | Eight |
| Silver medal – second place | 1978 Cambridge | Coxed four |
| Bronze medal – third place | 1979 Bled | Eight |
| Silver medal – second place | 1981 Munich | Eight |

Carol Page Brown (born April 19, 1953) is an American rower who competed in the 1976 Summer Olympics. She was also a member of the 1980 Olympic team women's eight that did not compete in the Moscow Olympic Games due to the US-led boycott. She was a member of the 1984 Olympic team in Los Angeles.

== Biography ==
Brown rowed for Princeton University and was the founder and three-time captain of the Princeton women's swimming team. She was a member of three All American relay teams (1973 and 1974) one of which set an American record (1973).

Her first US National Team was the 1974 World Championships where she and Princeton teammate Janet Youngholm raced to a fifth-place finish; the first US women's boat to reach a world championship finals. They qualified for the US Team by being National Champions in the pair event racing for Princeton University. At the 1975 World Rowing Championships, Brown won a silver medal with the women's eight.

In 1976 she was a crew member of the American boat that won an Olympic bronze medal in the eight event, the first time women's rowing was on the Olympic program. Brown was a nine-times member of the US National Rowing Team including the 1980 and the 1984 Olympic Teams. She is the holder of three silver and one bronze world championship medals. She won a gold medal at the Henley Royal Regatta in 1981 in the coxed fours. This was the first time women raced at Henley. At the time of her retirement, she held more World Championship medals than any other US woman.

Brown and the other members of the 1980 US Olympic team were awarded the Congressional Gold Medal, the highest civilian award which may be bestowed by the United States Congress. The medals were awarded to record the historical sacrifice the 1980 Olympians made to preserve freedom as well as to record the patriotic role of the 1980 US Olympic Team in the Cold War with the Soviet Union.

Brown was inducted into the US Rowing Hall of Fame in 1991 (1980 women's eight) and a second time in 2016 (1976 women's eight).

She is featured in the book "The Red Rose Crew" by Daniel J. Boyne, the story of the 1975 US women's World Championship eight that won a silver medal.

Brown served as a Vice President, US Olympians and Paralympians Association (USOPA) 2012-2020, the USOC athlete alumni organization.

Brown also competed in Triathlon - Sprint - Age Group. In 2019 She was National Champion and placed 4th at ITU World Championships in Lausanne, Switzerland, the top US finisher. In 2023 she placed 3rd at the ITU World Championships in Hamburg, Germany and was National Champion in the 70-74 age group.

== Personal life ==
Brown married another Princeton alumni, Lindsay Pomeroy, and they have one son. Their son, Stuart Pomeroy, also attended Princeton and played for the Princeton Tigers men's ice hockey.

In 2026, Brown presented the "Yes on I-638" argument for TVW's Video Voters' Guide, in support of a ballot initiative seeking to ban transgender Washington girls from competing in school sports. She also cowrote an op-ed in The Seattle Times on the topic.

== See also ==
- World Fit
- List of Princeton University Olympians
- USA Triathlon ITU World Championships 2019
