= Anatoly Nemtyryov =

Soviet rower

Personal information
- Born: Anatoly Mikhaylovich Nemtyryov; 24 December 1946 (age 79) Patrikeyevo, Moscow Oblast, Russian SFSR, Soviet Union
- Height: 187 cm (6 ft 2 in)
- Weight: 84 kg (185 lb)

Sport
- Sport: Rowing
Medal record
Men's rowing
Representing Soviet Union
World Rowing Championships
Gold medal – first place	1978 Cambridge	Coxless four
European Rowing Championships
Gold medal – first place	1973 Moscow	Coxed four

Anatoly Mikhaylovich Nemtyryov (Russian: Анатолий Михайлович Немтырёв; born 24 December 1946) is a Soviet rower.

Nemtyryov was born in Patrikeyevo, Moscow, in 1946. He competed at the 1968 Summer Olympics with the coxed four, where the team came sixth. He won a gold medal at the 1973 European Rowing Championships in Moscow with the coxed four. He competed at the 1976 Summer Olympics with the men's eight, where the team came seventh. He won a gold medal at the 1978 World Rowing Championships in Cambridge, New Zealand with the coxless four.
