= Natalya Klimova =

Ukrainian basketball player

Olympic medal record

Women's basketball

Representing the Soviet Union
Gold medal – first place	1976 Montreal	Team competition

Natalya Klimova (born 31 May 1951) is a Ukrainian former basketball player who competed in the 1976 Summer Olympics. She was born in Mariupol and played for Dynamo Kyiv.
