= Tamāra Dauniene =

Latvian basketball player (born 1951)

Olympic medal record

Women's basketball

Representing the Soviet Union
| Gold medal – first place | 1976 Montreal | Team |

Tamāra Dauniene (born 22 September 1951), is a Latvian former basketball player who competed in the 1976 Summer Olympics.
