= Jackie Zoch =

American rower

Personal information
- Full name: Jacqueline Jean Zoch
- Born: June 8, 1949 (age 77) Madison, Wisconsin, U.S.
Medal record
Women's rowing
Representing United States
Olympic Games
Bronze medal – third place	1976 Montreal	Eight

Jacqueline Jean "Jackie" Zoch (born June 8, 1949) is an American rower who competed in the 1976 Summer Olympics.

She was born in Madison, Wisconsin.

She competed in the 1976 Summer Olympics and was a crew member of the American boat which won the bronze medal in the eights event.
