= Tetiana Zakharova-Nadyrova =

Ukrainian basketball player

Olympic medal record

Women's basketball

Representing the Soviet Union
Gold medal – first place	1976 Montreal	Team competition
Gold medal – first place	1980 Moscow	Team competition

Tetiana Zakharova-Nadyrova (born 29 January 1951) is a Ukrainian former basketball player who competed in the 1976 Summer Olympics and in the 1980 Summer Olympics.
