= Elisabeta Lazăr =

Romanian rower (born 1950)

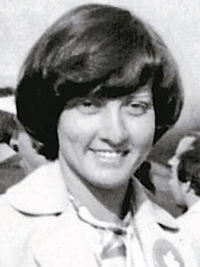

Personal information
- Born: 22 August 1950 (age 75) Arad, Romania
- Height: 170 cm (5 ft 7 in)
- Weight: 63 kg (139 lb)

Sport
- Sport: Rowing
Medal record
Representing Romania
Olympic Games
| Bronze medal – third place | 1976 Montreal | Quadruple sculls |
World Championships
| Silver medal – second place | 1974 Lucerne | Quadruple sculls |
European Championships
| Gold medal – first place | 1970 Tata | Quadruple sculls |
| Gold medal – first place | 1971 Copenhagen | Quadruple sculls |
| Silver medal – second place | 1973 Moscow | Quadruple sculls |

Elisabeta Lazăr (née Erzsébet Lázár, born 22 August 1950) is a retired Romanian rower who mostly competed in the quadruple sculls. In this event she won an Olympic bronze medal in 1976, a world championships silver medal in 1974 and European titles in 1970 and 1971.
