= Bogusława Kozłowska-Tomasiak =

Polish rower

Personal information
- Born: Bogusława Kozłowska; 11 October 1952 (age 73) Poznań, Poland
- Height: 172 cm (5 ft 8 in)
- Weight: 73 kg (161 lb)

Sport
- Country: Poland
- Sport: Rowing
- Club: AWF Poznań
Medal record
Women's rowing
Representing Poland
European Championships
Bronze medal – third place	1973 Moscow	Coxed four

Bogusława Tomasiak (née Kozłowska, born 11 October 1952) is a Polish rower. She competed at the 1976 Summer Olympics and the 1980 Summer Olympics.

She is married to Polish Olympic rower Adam Tomasiak.
