= Maria Kusters-ten Beitel =

Dutch rower

Personal information
- Born: 20 September 1949 (age 76) Eibergen, the Netherlands
- Height: 1.68 m (5 ft 6 in)
- Weight: 60 kg (130 lb)

Sport
- Sport: Rowing
- Club: Phocas, Nijmegen

Maria Kusters-ten Beitel (born 20 September 1949) is a retired Dutch rower. She finished fourth at the 1975 World Rowing Championships in the women's eight and eighth at the 1976 Summer Olympics in the women's eight.

Kusters-ten Beitel studied medicine in Nijmegen and later worked as a doctor. She is married to Gerard Kusters, also a rower and a doctor, who was the coach of the Dutch female coxed four team at the 1976 Olympics.
