= Ilona Richter =

German rower (born 1953)

Personal information
- Born: 11 March 1953 (age 73) Neukirchen, Erzgebirgskreis, East Germany

Sport
- Sport: Rowing
- Club: SC Berlin-Grünau
Medal record
Women's rowing
Representing East Germany
Olympic Games
Gold medal – first place	1976 Montreal	Eight
Gold medal – first place	1980 Moscow	Eight
World Rowing Championships
Gold medal – first place	1974 Lucerne	Eight
Gold medal – first place	1975 Nottingham	Eight
Gold medal – first place	1977 Amsterdam	Coxed four
Silver medal – second place	1979 Bled	Eight
European Rowing Championships
Silver medal – second place	1973 Moscow	Eight

Ilona Richter (later Dörfel, born 11 March 1953) is a German rower who competed for East Germany in the 1976 Summer Olympics and in the 1980 Summer Olympics, winning gold at both occasions.

Richter was born in Neukirchen, Erzgebirgskreis in 1953. She won a silver medal at the 1973 European Rowing Championships in Moscow with the women's eight. At the 1974 World Rowing Championships in Lucerne she won gold with the women's eight. She repeated this success in this boat class at the 1975 World Rowing Championships in Nottingham. At the 1976 Summer Olympics, she was a crew member of the East German boat that won the gold medal in the eight event.

She changed to the coxed four and became world champion at the 1977 World Rowing Championships in Amsterdam. In February 1978, she was given the sports awards Honoured Master of Sports. By 1979, she was back in the eight and won a silver medal at the World Championships in Bled. At the 1980 Summer Olympics, she won her second Olympic gold with the women's eight.
