= Helma Lehmann =

East German rower (born 1953)

Personal information
- Born: Helma Mähren; 23 June 1953 (age 73) Plaue, Brandenburg an der Havel, East Germany

Sport
- Sport: Rowing
Medal record
Women's rowing
Representing East Germany
Olympic Games
Gold medal – first place	1976 Montreal	Eight
World Rowing Championships
Gold medal – first place	1974 Lucerne	Eight
Gold medal – first place	1975 Nottingham	Coxed four
European Rowing Championships
Silver medal – second place	1973 Moscow	Eight

Helma Mähren-Lehmann (née Mähren; born 23 June 1953) is a German rower who competed in the 1976 Summer Olympics representing East Germany.

She won the gold medal as part of the women's eight.
