= Gail Ricketson =

American rower

Personal information
- Full name: Gail Susan Ricketson
- Born: September 12, 1953 (age 72) Plattsburgh, New York, U.S.
Medal record
Women's rowing
Representing United States
Olympic Games
Bronze medal – third place	1976 Montreal	Eight

Gail Susan Ricketson (born September 12, 1953) is an American rower who competed in the 1976 Summer Olympics.

She was born in Plattsburgh, New York.

In 1976 she was a crew member of the American boat which won the bronze medal in the eights event.
