= Vladimir Eshinov =

Russian rower (1949–2024)

Personal information
- Born: 18 February 1949 Kirishi, Leningrad Oblast, Russian SFSR, USSR
- Died: 30 July 2024 (aged 75)

Sport
- Sport: Rowing
Medal record
Men's rowing
Representing the Soviet Union
Olympic Games
| Gold medal – first place | 1976 Montreal | Coxed four |
World Rowing Championships
| Gold medal – first place | 1974 Lucerne | Coxed pair |
| Gold medal – first place | 1975 Nottingham | Coxed four |
| Silver medal – second place | 1977 Amsterdam | Eight |
| Bronze medal – third place | 1970 St. Catharines | Coxed pair |
European Rowing Championships
| Gold medal – first place | 1973 Moscow | Coxed pair |
| Bronze medal – third place | 1971 Copenhagen | Coxed pair |

Vladimir Nikolaevich Eshinov (Russian: Владимир Николаевич Ешинов, 18 February 1949 – 30 July 2024) was a Russian rower who competed for the Soviet Union in the 1972 Summer Olympics and in the 1976 Summer Olympics.

== Biography ==
Eshinov was born in Kirishi on 18 February 1949.

In 1972 he was a crew member of the Soviet boat which finished fifth in the coxed pair event.

Four years later he won the gold with the Soviet boat in the coxed fours competition.

Eshinov died on 30 July 2024, at the age of 75.
