= Mira Bryunina =

Russian rower

Medal record

Women's rowing

Representing Soviet Union

Olympic Games
Silver medal – second place	1976 Montreal	Coxed quad sculls

World Rowing Championships
Silver medal – second place	1991 Vienna	Coxed quad sculls

Mira Vasilevna Bryunina Vaganova (Russian: Мира Васильевна Брюнина, born 16 September 1951) is a Russian rower who competed for the Soviet Union in the 1976 Summer Olympics.

In 1976, she was a crew member of the Soviet boat, which won the silver medal in the quadruple sculls event.
