= Loes Schutte =

Dutch rower

Personal information
- Born: 12 June 1953 (age 73) Zandvoort, the Netherlands
- Height: 1.68 m (5 ft 6 in)
- Weight: 66 kg (146 lb)

Sport
- Sport: Rowing
- Club: Nereus, Amsterdam

Louise Henriëtte Maria "Loes" Schutte (born 12 June 1953) is a retired Dutch rower. Her teams finished fourth at the 1975 World Championships and eights at the 1976 Summer Olympics in the women's eight event.
