= Anne Warner (rower) =

American Olympic lawyer

Personal information
- Full name: Anne Elizabeth Taubes Warner
- Born: August 24, 1954 (age 71) Boston, Massachusetts, U.S.
- Occupation: Attorney
- Height: 173 cm (5 ft 8 in)
- Weight: 68 kg (150 lb)
- Spouse: Clifford Taubes

Sport
- Sport: Rowing
- Event: Women's Eights
Medal record
Women's rowing
Representing the United States
Olympic Games
Bronze medal – third place	1976 Montreal	Eight
World Rowing Championships
Silver medal – second place	1975 Nottingham	Eight

Anne Elizabeth Taubes Warner or Anne Warner Taubes (born August 24, 1954) is an American lawyer and a rower who competed in the 1976 Summer Olympics for the United States.

== Early life ==
Warner was born in Boston, Massachusetts. She grew up in Lexington, Massachusetts.

Warner attended Yale University, graduating with a B.A. in Russian studies, cum laude, in 1977. While at Yale, she conducted the Yale Slavic Chorus and was a member of St. Anthony Hall. She was also a member of the women's crew team, in the position of stroke. Warner was part of a protest of the women's crew for equal facilities under Title IX. By the water, there was no locker room for the women's crew team, so they had to wait on the bus after practice while the men showered before they could return to campus. The New York Times ran a story about their protest and quoted Warner saying, "We'll probably get [showers] when Peter Pan comes back to life." By 1977, a women's locker room was added to Yale's boathouse.

After graduating from Yale, Warner went to Bulgaria for a year to collect folk music from the mountain villages on a fellowship from Yale. She formed and conducted the Cambridge Slavic Chorus.

She then attended Harvard Law School. She took time off for the Olympics, but did return and complete her Juris Doctor degree. Her focus was international dispute resolution.

== Rowing ==
She rowed eights for the United States in the World Championships in 1975, 1977, and 1978. She finished second in the 1975 World Championships with the "Red Rose Crew." Her team placed sixth in 1977 and fourth in 1978.

In the 1976 Summer Olympics, she was a member of the American eight-oared crew which won the bronze medal.

In 1980, she won the Lucerne International Regatta rowing eights. Warner qualified for the 1980 Summer Olympic United States team but was unable to compete due to the 1980 Summer Olympics boycott by the United States.

Warner also coached the lightweight double of Chris Ernst and C.B. Sands which won the gold at the World Championships in 1986.

In 2007, she received a Congressional Gold Medals created especially the members of the 1980 Summer Olympic team. In 2016, she was inducted into the National Rowing Hall of Fame. She is also a U.S Hall of Fame coach. She has served on the U.S Olympic Committee for rowing.

== Career ==
Warner worked for the law firms Cooley, Godward and Hill & Barlow in Boston. She took a hiatus from law to raise children, and also was a selectman for the town of Belmont, Massachusetts, from 1992 to 1995. In 2005, she was the vice president of business development for the software development company Leutan.

She has also worked as the general counsel for Inverness Medical Innovations (now Alere) and Global M&A. She was the general counsel and compliance officer for the software company Pegasystems from July 2014 to July 2017. She became general counsel for Velcro Companies in July 2017. She is currently general counsel for Algorand.,

== Personal ==
She married Clifford Taubes, a mathematician and professor at Harvard University. They lived in Belmont, Massachusetts, and had two children, Ally and Hannibal, prior to divorcing. She currently lives in Lincoln, Massachusetts, with her partner, Daniel Paul.
