= Henrietta Ebert =

East German rower (born 1954)

Personal information
- Born: Henrietta Dobler; 15 January 1954 (age 72) Brandenburg an der Havel, Bezirk Potsdam, East Germany
- Height: 177 cm (5 ft 10 in)
- Weight: 83 kg (183 lb)

Sport
- Sport: Rowing
- Club: SC Dynamo Berlin
Medal record
Women's rowing
Representing East Germany
Olympic Games
Gold medal – first place	1976 Montreal	Eight
World Rowing Championships
Gold medal – first place	1974 Lucerne	Eight
Gold medal – first place	1975 Nottingham	Coxed four
Silver medal – second place	1978 Cambridge	Eight
European Rowing Championships
Silver medal – second place	1973 Moscow	Eight

Henrietta Ebert (née Dobler, born 15 January 1954) is a German rower who won the gold medal at the 1976 Summer Olympics and was a member of the SC Dynamo Potsdam.

She was born in Kirchmöser, Brandenburg an der Havel. She competed under her married name from 1976.

She trained as a confectioner and later worked as a public servant in Köpenick.
