= Monika Kallies =

German rower (born 1956)

Personal information
- Born: 31 July 1956 (age 69) Stralsund, Bezirk Rostock, East Germany
- Height: 185 cm (6 ft 1 in)
- Weight: 88 kg (194 lb)

Sport
- Sport: Rowing
Medal record
Representing East Germany
Women's rowing
| Gold medal – first place | 1976 Montreal | Eight |
World Championships
| Gold medal – first place | 1975 Nottingham | Eight |

Monika Kallies (later Leschhorn; born 31 July 1956) is a German rower.

Kallies was born in 1956 in Stralsund and was a member of SC Dynamo Potsdam / Sportvereinigung (SV) Dynamo. At the 1975 World Rowing Championships in Nottingham she won a gold medal with the women's eight. She won a gold medal at the 1976 Summer Olympics with the women's eight.
