= Nadezhda Chernyshyova =

Soviet rower (born 1951)

Medal record

Women's rowing

Representing Soviet Union

Olympic Games
Silver medal – second place	1976 Montreal	Coxed quad sculls

Nadezhda Petrovna Chernyshova (born 21 March 1951; Russian: Надежда Петровна Чернышёва) is a former coxswain who competed for the Soviet Union in the 1976 Summer Olympics.

In 1976 at the Olympics in Montreal she was the coxswain of the Soviet boat which won the silver medal in the quadruple sculls event.
