= Sabine Jahn =

East German rower

Personal information
- Born: 27 June 1953 (age 73) Neuruppin, East Germany
- Spouse: Reinhard Gust

Sport
- Sport: Rowing
Medal record
Women's rowing
Representing East Germany
Olympic Games
Silver medal – second place	1976 Montreal	Double sculls
World Rowing Championships
Silver medal – second place	1975 Nottingham	Double sculls
Gold medal – first place	1977 Amsterdam	Coxed quad sculls
European Rowing Championships
Gold medal – first place	1973 Moscow	Coxed quad sculls

Sabine Jahn (later Gust, born 27 June 1953) is a German rower who competed for East Germany in the 1976 Summer Olympics.

She was born in Neuruppin. She is married to Reinhard Gust and has competed since the 1977 rowing season under her married name.

In 1976 she and her partner Petra Boesler won an Olympic silver medal in the double sculls event. In February 1978, she was given the sports awards Honoured Master of Sports.
