= Irina Müller =

East German rower

Personal information
- Born: 10 October 1951 (age 74) Leipzig, East Germany
- Occupation: judge
- Height: 176 cm (5 ft 9 in)
- Weight: 84 kg (185 lb)
- Spouse: Stefan Weiße

Sport
- Sport: Rowing
- Club: SC Dynamo Berlin
Medal record
Women's rowing
Representing East Germany
Olympic Games
Gold medal – first place	1976 Montreal	Eight
World Rowing Championships
Gold medal – first place	1974 Luzern	Eight
Gold medal – first place	1975 Nottingham	Coxed four
European Rowing Championships
Silver medal – second place	1973 Moscow	Eight
Bronze medal – third place	1971 Copenhagen	Coxed four

Irina Müller (later Weiße, born 10 October 1951) is a German rower, who won the gold medal at the 1976 Summer Olympics and was a member of the SG Dynamo Potsdam.

Müller was born in Leipzig; sources vary whether the birth year was 1950 or 1951.

Immediately after the 1976 Summer Olympics, she married fellow rower Stefan Weiße. As Irina Weiße, she was awarded a Patriotic Order of Merit in silver in September 1976. She was an informer for the Stasi under the codename "Ines".
