= Barbara de Jong =

Dutch rower (born 1952)

Personal information
- Full name: Barbara Francine de Jong
- Born: 22 June 1952 (age 74) Enschede, the Netherlands
- Height: 1.78 m (5 ft 10 in)
- Weight: 65 kg (143 lb)

Sport
- Sport: Rowing
- Club: Njord, Leiden

Barbara Francine de Jong (born 22 June 1952) is a retired Dutch rower. She finished in eighth place at the 1975 World Rowing Championships in the coxed four and at the 1976 Summer Olympics in the women's eight.
