= Christiane Köpke =

East German rower

Personal information
- Born: Christiane Knetsch; 24 August 1956 (age 69) Brandenburg an der Havel, East Germany
- Height: 181 cm (5 ft 11 in)
- Weight: 72 kg (159 lb)

Sport
- Sport: Rowing
Medal record
Women's rowing
Representing East Germany
Olympic Games
Gold medal – first place	1976 Montreal	Eight
Gold medal – first place	1980 Moscow	Eight
World Rowing Championships
Gold medal – first place	1975 Nottingham	Eight
Silver medal – second place	1978 Cambridge	Eight

Christiane Köpke (née Knetsch, born 24 August 1956) is a German rower who competed for East Germany. She won the Olympic gold medal at the 1976 Summer Olympics as well as four years later at the 1980 Summer Olympics. She was a member of SG Dynamo Potsdam / Sportvereinigung (SV) Dynamo.
