= Lynn Silliman =

American rower (born 1959)

Personal information
- Born: April 24, 1959 (age 67) Watsonville, California, U.S.
Medal record
Women's rowing
Representing United States
Olympic Games
Bronze medal – third place	1976 Montreal	Eight
World Rowing Championships
Silver medal – second place	1975 Nottingham	Eight

Lynn Silliman (born April 24, 1959) is an American rower who competed in the 1976 Summer Olympics.

She was born in Watsonville, California in 1959. In 1976, she was the coxswain of the American boat that won the bronze medal in the women's eight event.
