= Vytautas Butkus =

Lithuanian rower (born 1949)

Personal information
- Born: 20 December 1949 (age 76) Kaunas, Lithuania

Sport
- Sport: Rowing
Medal record
Men's rowing
Representing the Soviet Union
Olympic Games
Silver medal – second place	1976 Montreal	Quadruple sculls
World Rowing Championships
Bronze medal – third place	1975 Nottingham	Quadruple sculls
European Rowing Championships
Silver medal – second place	1973 Moscow	Single sculls

Vytautas Butkus (born 20 December 1949) is a Lithuanian rower who competed for the Soviet Union in the 1976 Summer Olympics.

In 1976 he was a crew member of the Soviet boat which won the silver medal in the quadruple sculls event.
