= Anna Kondrashina =

Soviet rower

Medal record

Women's rowing

Representing the Soviet Union

Olympic Games
Silver medal – second place	1976 Montreal	Coxed quad sculls

World Championships
Silver medal – second place	1978 Cambridge	Single sculls

Anna Nikolaevna Kondrashina (later Krylova; Russian: Анна Николаевна Кондрашина; born 23 December 1955 in Leningrad) is a Russian rower who competed for the Soviet Union in the 1976 Summer Olympics.

In 1976 she was a crew member of the Soviet boat which won the silver medal in the quadruple sculls event.
