= Brigitte Ahrenholz =

East German rower

Personal information
- Born: 8 August 1952 Potsdam, East Germany
- Died: March or April 2018 (aged 65)

Sport
- Sport: Rowing
Medal record
Women's rowing
Representing East Germany
Gold medal – first place	1976 Montreal	Eight
World Rowing Championships
Gold medal – first place	1974 Lucerne	Eight
European Rowing Championships
Silver medal – second place	1971 Copenhagen	Eight
Gold medal – first place	1973 Moscow	Coxed quad scull

Brigitte Irene Ahrenholz (8 August 1952 – March or April 2018) was a German rower who competed for East Germany in the 1976 Summer Olympics.

She was born in Potsdam. In 1976 she was a crew member of the East German boat that won the gold medal in the eight event. After her rowing career, she studied medicine and graduated in 1983. At first she worked at the Vivantes Klinikum im Friedrichshain as a surgeon before moving to Werder where she continued as a surgeon until her retirement.

Ahrenholz was last seen on the evening of 3 March 2018, reported to Police as missing the following morning and was found dead over a month later, on 7 April 2018, aged 65. Her cause of death is currently unknown.
