= Marleen van Rij =

Dutch rower

Personal information
- Born: 29 August 1950 (age 75) Leiden, the Netherlands
- Height: 1.84 m (6 ft 0 in)
- Weight: 74 kg (163 lb)

Sport
- Sport: Rowing
- Club: Argo, Wageningen

Maria Helena "Marleen" van Rij (born 29 August 1950) is a retired Dutch rower. She finished sixth at the 1977 World Rowing Championships in the women's eight and eighth at the 1976 Summer Olympics in the women's eight.
