= Genovaitė Ramoškienė =

Soviet rower

Personal information
- Born: 12 May 1945 (age 81) Daičiūnai, Lithuanian SSR, Soviet Union
- Height: 1.70 m (5 ft 7 in)
- Weight: 72 kg (159 lb)

Sport
- Sport: Rowing
- Club: Žalgiris Kaunas
Medal record
Representing the Soviet Union
Olympic Games
Bronze medal – third place	1976 Montreal	Double sculls
World Rowing Championships
Silver medal – second place	1974 Lucerne	Single sculls
Bronze medal – third place	1975 Nottingham	Single sculls
European Rowing Championships
Gold medal – first place	1969 Klagenfurt	Single sculls
Gold medal – first place	1973 Moscow	Single sculls
Bronze medal – third place	1967 Vichy	Single sculls
Bronze medal – third place	1970 Tata	Single sculls

Genovaitė Ramoškienė (née Šidagytė on 12 May 1945) is a retired Lithuanian rower. She won a bronze medal at the 1976 Summer Olympics in the double sculls event, together with Eleonora Kaminskaitė. Individually, she won two gold, one silver and three bronze medals in the single sculls at the European and world championships of 1967–1975.

After graduating from the Lithuanian Sports University in 1966 Ramoškienė worked as a lecturer of physical education.
