= Nadezhda Roshchina =

Soviet/Russian rower

Olympic medal record

Women's rowing

Representing the Soviet Union
Silver medal – second place	1976 Montreal	Eight

Nadezhda Nikolaevna Roshchina (Russian: Надежда Николаевна Рощина, born 30 June 1954) is a Russian rower who competed for the Soviet Union in the 1976 Summer Olympics. She was 184 cm tall and weighed 14st.

In 1976, she was a crew member of the Soviet boat which won the silver medal in the eights event.
