= Karin Abma =

Dutch rower (born 1951)

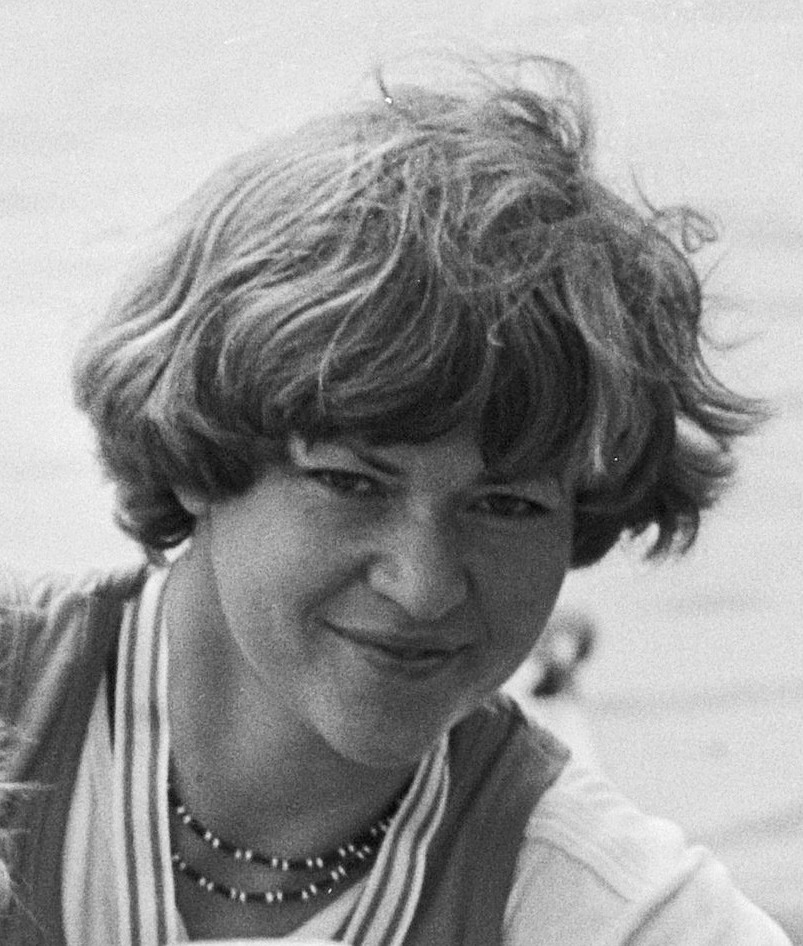
- Karin Abma (right) at the 1977 World Championships

Personal information
- Born: 5 December 1951 (age 74) Arnhem, Netherlands
- Height: 1.74 m (5 ft 9 in)
- Weight: 62 kg (137 lb)

Sport
- Sport: Rowing
- Club: Nereus, Amsterdam
Medal record
Women's rowing
Representing the Netherlands
World Rowing Championships
Silver medal – second place	1977 Amsterdam	Coxless pair
Bronze medal – third place	1978 Hamilton	Coxless pair

Karin Abma (born 5 December 1951) is a retired Dutch rower. She was most successful in the coxless pair, winning two medals with Joke Dierdorp at the world championships of 1977 and 1978. In the women's eight, she was fourth at the 1975 World Rowing Championships and eighth at the 1976 Summer Olympics.
