= Nadiya Rozhon =

Ukrainian rower

Olympic medal record

Women's rowing
Silver medal – second place	1976 Montreal	Eight

Nadiya Ivanivna Rozhon (Ukrainian: Надія Іванівна Розгон, born 15 November 1952) is a Ukrainian rower who competed for the Soviet Union in the 1976 Summer Olympics.

In 1976 she was a crew member of the Soviet boat which won the silver medal in the eights event.
