= Evelien Koogje =

Dutch rower

Personal information
- Born: 31 July 1959 (age 66) Appingedam, Netherlands
- Height: 1.71 m (5 ft 7 in)
- Weight: 66 kg (146 lb)

Sport
- Sport: Rowing
- Club: DDS, Delft

Evangeline "Evelien" Koogje (born 31 July 1959) is a retired Dutch rower. Her teams finished in eighth place at the 1975 World Championships in the coxed four and at the 1976 Summer Olympics in the eight events.
