= Olha Puhovska =

Soviet rower

Olympic medal record

Women's rowing
Silver medal – second place	1976 Montreal	Eight

Olha Oleksandrivna Puhovska (Ukrainian: Ольга Олександрівна Пуговська, also known as Olga Pugavskaya; born 1 November 1942) is a Ukrainian rower who competed for the Soviet Union in the 1976 Summer Olympics.

In 1976 she was the coxswain of the Soviet boat which won the silver medal in the eights event.
