= Yelena Antonova (rower) =

Soviet rower

Personal information
- Born: Yelena Petrovna Antonova; 21 August 1952 (age 73) Tashkent, Uzbek SSR, Soviet Union
- Height: 180 cm (5 ft 11 in)
- Weight: 78 kg (172 lb)

Sport
- Sport: Rowing
Medal record
Women's rowing
Representing Soviet Union
Olympic Games
Bronze medal – third place	1976 Montreal	Single sculls
World Rowing Championships
Gold medal – first place	1974 Lucerne	Double sculls
Gold medal – first place	1975 Nottingham	Double sculls
European Rowing Championships
Gold medal – first place	1973 Moscow	Double sculls

Yelena Petrovna Antonova (born 21 August 1952) is a rower from the Soviet Union.

She competed for the Soviet Union in the 1976 Summer Olympics held in Montreal, Canada in the single sculls event where she finished in third place.
