= Olena Zubko =

Ukrainian rower

Olympic medal record

Women's rowing
| Silver medal – second place | 1976 Montreal | Eight |

Olena Antonivna Zubko (Ukrainian: Олена Антонівна Зубко, born 8 May 1953) is a Ukrainian rower who competed for the Soviet Union in the 1976 Summer Olympics.

In 1976, she was a crew member of the Soviet boat which won the silver medal in the eights event.
