= Lyubov Talalaeva =

Soviet/Russian rower (1953–2021)

Olympic medal record

Women's rowing
Silver medal – second place	1976 Montreal	Eight

Lyubov Andreevna Talalaeva (Russian: Любовь Андреевна Талалаева, 24 January 1953 – 24 May 2021) was a Russian rower who competed for the Soviet Union in the 1976 Summer Olympics. In 1976 she was a crew member of the Soviet boat which won the silver medal in the eights event.
