= Klavdija Koženkova =

Soviet rower

Personal information
- Born: 22 March 1949 (age 77)

Sport
- Sport: Rowing
Medal record
Women's rowing
Representing the Soviet Union
Silver medal – second place	1976 Montreal	Eight
European Rowing Championships
Gold medal – first place	1967 Vichy	Eight

Klavdija Koženkova (née Korniuščenko, born 22 March 1949) is a Lithuanian rower who competed for the Soviet Union in the 1976 Summer Olympics.

In 1976 she was a crew member of the Soviet boat that won the silver medal in the women's eight event.
