= Olha Kolkova =

Ukrainian rower

Olympic medal record

Women's rowing
Silver medal – second place	1976 Montreal	Eight

Olha Oleksiyivna Kolkova (Ukrainian: Ольга Олексіївна Колкова, born 29 May 1955) is a Ukrainian rower who competed for the Soviet Union in the 1976 Summer Olympics.

In 1976 she was a crew member of the Soviet boat which won the silver medal in the eights event.
