= Nelli Tarakanova =

Ukrainian rower

Olympic medal record

Women's rowing
Silver medal – second place	1976 Montreal	Eight

Nelli Yuriyivna Tarakanova (Ukrainian: Неллі Юріївна Тараканова; born 9 September 1954) is a Ukrainian rower who competed for the Soviet Union in the 1976 Summer Olympics. In 1976 she was 184 cm tall and weighed 92 kg or 14st 7 pounds.

In 1976 she was a crew member of the Soviet boat which won the silver medal in the eights event.
