= Galina Yermolayeva (rower) =

Russian rower (born 1948)

Personal information
- Born: Galina Nikonorovna Suslina; 21 October 1948 (age 77) Leningrad, Russian SFSR, Soviet Union

Sport
- Sport: Rowing
Medal record
Women's rowing
Representing the Soviet Union
Olympic Games
Silver medal – second place	1976 Montreal	Coxed quad sculls
World Rowing Championships
Gold medal – first place	1974 Lucerne	Double sculls
Gold medal – first place	1975 Nottingham	Double sculls
European Rowing Championships
Silver medal – second place	1970 Tata	Double sculls
Gold medal – first place	1971 Copenhagen	Double sculls
Gold medal – first place	1972 Brandenburg	Double sculls

Galina Nikonorovna Yermolayeva (née Suslina, Russian: Галина Никаноровна Ермолаева, born 21 October 1948) is a Russian rower who competed for the Soviet Union in the 1976 Summer Olympics.

In 1976 she was a crew member of the Soviet boat which won the silver medal in the quadruple sculls event.

Her son, Anton Sema, represented Russia at the 1996 Summer Olympics in single sculls.
