= Joke Dierdorp =

Dutch rower (born 1955)

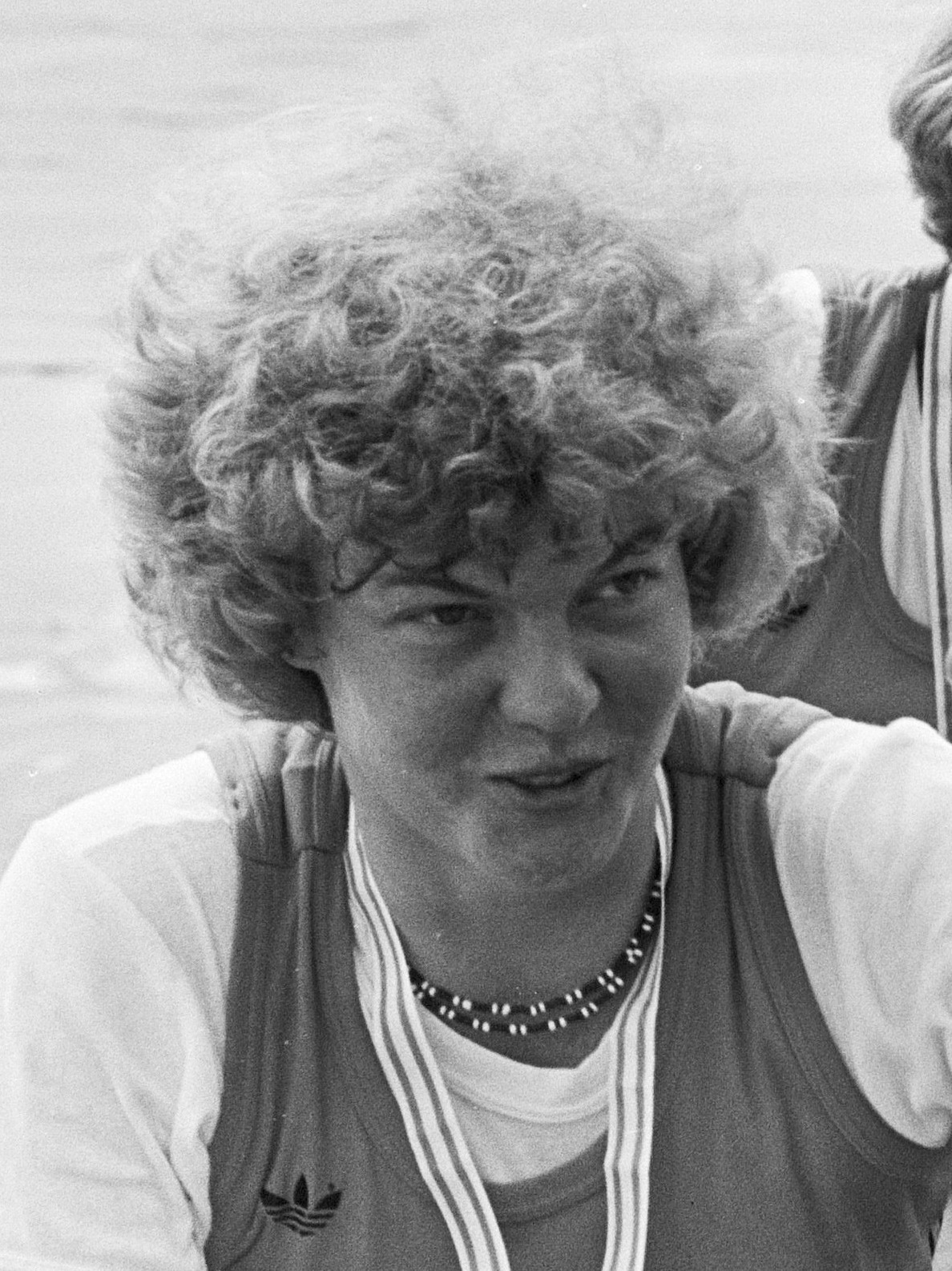
- Joke Dierdorp at the 1977 World Championships

Personal information
- Born: 21 January 1955 (age 71) Curaçao
- Height: 1.78 m (5 ft 10 in)
- Weight: 67 kg (148 lb)

Sport
- Sport: Rowing
- Club: Nereus, Amsterdam

Achievements and titles
- Olympic finals: 1976
Medal record
Women's rowing
Representing the Netherlands
World Rowing Championships
Silver medal – second place	1977 Amsterdam	Coxless pair
Bronze medal – third place	1978 Hamilton	Coxless pair

Joke Dierdorp (born 21 January 1955) is a retired Dutch rower. She was most successful in the coxless pair, finishing with Karin Abma in second, third and fourth place at the world championships of 1977, 1978 and 1979, respectively; in 1979 they missed a bronze medal by about 0.6 seconds. In the women's eight, she was fourth at the 1975 World Rowing Championships and eighth at the 1976 Summer Olympics.
