= Rowing at the 1976 Summer Olympics – Men's coxed four =

Men's coxed four at the Games of the XXI Olympiad
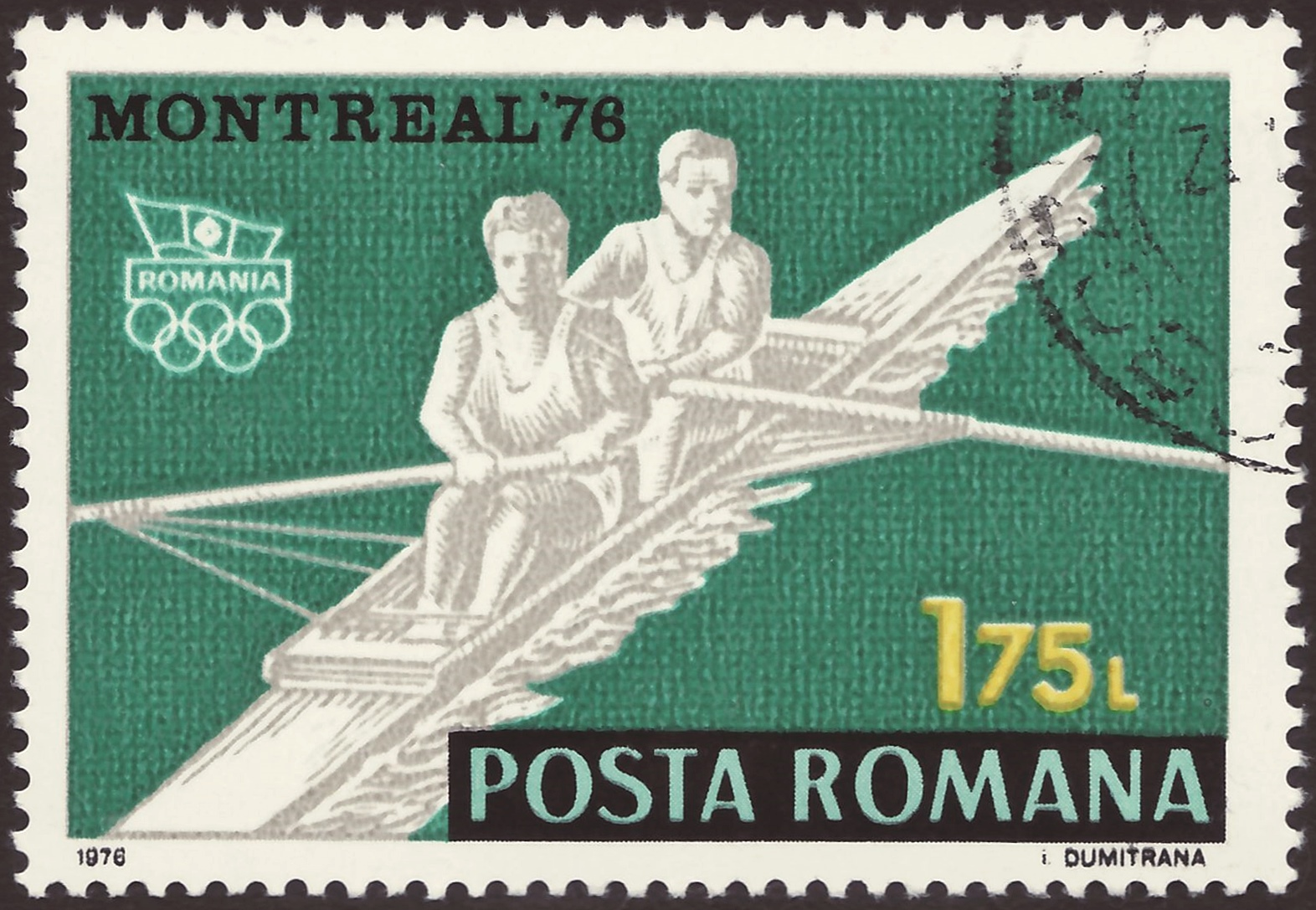
- Romania stamp commemorating rowing at the 1976 Olympics
- Venue: Olympic basin at Notre Dame Island
- Dates: 18–25 July 1976
- Competitors: 71 from 14 nations
- Winning time: 6:40.22

Medalists
1st place, gold medalist(s)		Soviet Union: Vladimir Eshinov; Nikolay Ivanov; Mikhail Kuznetsov; Aleksandr Klepikov; Aleksandr Lukyanov (cox); Aleksandr Sema (heat 1)
2nd place, silver medalist(s)		East Germany: Andreas Schulz; Rüdiger Kunze; Walter Dießner; Ullrich Dießner; Johannes Thomas (cox)
3rd place, bronze medalist(s)		West Germany: Hans-Johann Färber; Ralph Kubail; Siegfried Fricke; Peter Niehusen; Hartmut Wenzel (cox)

The men's coxed four (M4+) competition at the 1976 Summer Olympics took place at the rowing basin on Notre Dame Island in Montreal, Quebec, Canada. It was held from 18 to 25 July and was won by the team from Soviet Union. There were 14 boats (71 competitors, with the Soviet Union making one substitution) from 14 nations, with each nation limited to a single boat in the event. The victory was the Soviet Union's first medal in the men's coxed four. East Germany took its third consecutive silver medal, with entirely different crews each time. The defending champion West Germany received bronze this time. Hans-Johann Färber, the only rower from the 1972 gold medal team to return, became the fifth man to earn multiple medals in the event.

== Background ==
This was the 15th appearance of the event. Rowing had been on the programme in 1896 but was cancelled due to bad weather. The coxed four was one of the four initial events introduced in 1900. It was not held in 1904 or 1908, but was held at every Games from 1912 to 1992 when it (along with the men's coxed pair) was replaced with the men's lightweight double sculls and men's lightweight coxless four.

While West Germany had won the previous Olympic event in 1972, the Soviet Union had since won most of the relevant competitions: the 1973 European Rowing Championships (the event was discontinued after 1973) and the 1975 World Rowing Championships. In the 1974 World Rowing Championships, the Soviet Union won silver. East Germany had won silver at the 1972 Summer Olympics and had since won silver at the 1973 European Rowing Championships, gold at the 1974 World Rowing Championships, and silver in the following year. West Germany had not made the A final at the 1973 European Rowing Championships, but had won bronze at both the subsequent world championships. The only other country that had won medals in these events was Czechoslovakia, having won bronze in both 1972 and 1973.

Bulgaria and Ireland each made their debut in the event. The United States made its 13th appearance, most among nations to that point.

=== Previous M4+ competitions ===
Competition	Gold	Silver	Bronze
1972 Summer Olympics	West Germany	East Germany	Czechoslovakia
1973 European Rowing Championships	Soviet Union	East Germany	Czechoslovakia
1974 World Rowing Championships	East Germany	Soviet Union	West Germany
1975 World Rowing Championships	Soviet Union	East Germany	West Germany

== Competition format ==
The coxed four event featured five-person boats, with four rowers and a coxswain. It was a sweep rowing event, with the rowers each having one oar (and thus each rowing on one side). The competition used the 2000 metres distance that became standard at the 1912 Olympics and which has been used ever since except at the 1948 Games.

The tournament used the four-round format (three main rounds and a repechage) that had been used in 1968. The competition continued to use the six-boat heat standardised in 1960 as well as the "B" final for ranking 7th through 12th place introduced in 1964.

- Quarterfinals: Three heats of 4 or 5 boats each. The top three boats in each heat (9 total) advanced directly to the semifinals. The remaining boats (5 total) went to the repechage.
- Repechage: One heat of 5 boats. The top three boats rejoined the quarterfinal winners in the semifinals. The other boats (2 total) were eliminated.
- Semifinals: Two heats of 6 boats each. The top three boats in each heat (6 total) advanced to Final A, the remaining boats (6 total) went to Final B.
- Final: Two finals. Final A consisted of the top 6 boats. Final B placed boats 7 through 12.

== Schedule ==
All times are Eastern Daylight Time (UTC-4)

Date	Time	Round
Sunday, 18 July 1976	10:00	Quarterfinals
Tuesday, 20 July 1976	10:00	Repechage
Friday, 23 July 1976	10:00	Semifinals
Sunday, 25 July 1976	10:00	Finals

== Results ==
=== Quarterfinals ===
Three heats were rowed on 18 July. Two of the heats had five teams and one had four teams, with the first three teams to qualify for the semifinals, and the remaining teams progressing to the repechage.

==== Quarterfinal 1 ====
Rank	Rowers	Coxswain	Nation	Time	Notes
1	Martin Baltus; Adrie Klem; Evert Kroes; Gert Jan van Woudenberg	Jos Ruijs	Netherlands	6:38.95	Q
2	Vladimir Eshinov; Nikolay Ivanov; Aleksandr Klepikov; Aleksandr Sema	Aleksandr Lukyanov	Soviet Union	6:41.54	Q
3	Bernard Bruand; Serge Fornara; Lionel Girard; Jean-Jacques Mulot	Jean-Pierre Huguet-Balent	France	6:42.14	Q
4	Lachezar Boychev; Ivan Botev; Nacho Minchev; Kiril Kirchev	Nenko Dobrev	Bulgaria	6:43.69	R
5	Enzo Borgonovi; Gino Iseppi; Battista Paganelli; Ariosto Temporin	Paolo Trisciani	Italy	6:44.81	R

==== Quarterfinal 2 ====
Rank	Rowers	Coxswain	Nation	Time	Notes
1	Vladimír Jánoš; Otakar Mareček; Karel Neffe; Milan Suchopár	Vladimír Petříček	Czechoslovakia	6:47.57	Q
2	Ian Boserio; Viv Haar; Danny Keane; Tim Logan	David Simmons	New Zealand	6:48.25	Q
3	Jim Muldoon; Christy O'Brien; Willie Ryan; Mick Ryan	Liam Redmond	Ireland	6:50.76	Q
4	Tom Amundsen; Kjell Sverre Johansen; Sverre Norberg; Rune Dahl	Alf Torp	Norway	6:52.18	R
5	Hugo Aberastegui; Gerardo Constantini; Ignacio Ruiz; Raúl Tettamanti	Jorge Segurado	Argentina	7:04.38	R

==== Quarterfinal 3 ====
Rank	Rowers	Coxswain	Nation	Time	Notes
1	Ullrich Dießner; Walter Dießner; Rüdiger Kunze; Andreas Schulz	Johannes Thomas	East Germany	6:27.97	Q
2	Hans-Johann Färber; Siegfried Fricke; Ralph Kubail; Peter Niehusen	Hartmut Wenzel	West Germany	6:31.52	Q
3	Fred Borchelt; Robert Zagunis; Pat Hayes; Michael Plumb	John Hartigan	United States	6:36.52	Q
4	Jerzy Broniec; Ryszard Burak; Jerzy Ulczyński; Adam Tomasiak	Włodzimierz Chmielewski	Poland	6:42.55	R

=== Repechage ===
One heat was rowed in the repechage on 20 July. Of the five teams competing, the first three progressed to the semifinals. Poland swapped seats 2 and 4 for this race. The team from Bulgaria swapped three of the seats for the repechage. Italy swapped seats 1 to 3. Norway swapped seats 2 to 4. Argentina and Norway were eliminated in the repechage.

Rank	Rowers	Coxswain	Nation	Time	Notes
1	Jerzy Broniec; Adam Tomasiak; Jerzy Ulczyński; Ryszard Burak	Włodzimierz Chmielewski	Poland	6:22.16	Q
2	Nacho Minchev; Ivan Botev; Kiril Kirchev; Lachezar Boychev	Nenko Dobrev	Bulgaria	6:23.47	Q
3	Battista Paganelli; Enzo Borgonovi; Gino Iseppi; Ariosto Temporin	Paolo Trisciani	Italy	6:25.43	Q
4	Hugo Aberastegui; Gerardo Constantini; Ignacio Ruiz; Raúl Tettamanti	Jorge Segurado	Argentina	6:26.89	
5	Tom Amundsen; Rune Dahl; Kjell Sverre Johansen; Sverre Norberg	Alf Torp	Norway	6:26.93	

=== Semifinals ===
Two heats were rowed in the semifinals on 23 July. Of the six teams competing per heat, the first three would qualify for the A final, while the others would progress to the B final.

==== Semifinal 1 ====
East Germany swapped the seats of all four rowers. The New Zealanders swapped seats 2 and 4. The United States swapped seats 2 to 4. The Dutch changed the seats of all four rowers. The French team swapped the stroke with seat 3.

Rank	Rowers	Coxswain	Nation	Time	Notes
1	Andreas Schulz; Rüdiger Kunze; Ullrich Dießner; Walter Dießner	Johannes Thomas	East Germany	6:11.32	QA
2	Nacho Minchev; Ivan Botev; Kiril Kirchev; Lachezar Boychev	Nenko Dobrev	Bulgaria	6:13.26	QA
3	Ian Boserio; Tim Logan; Danny Keane; Viv Haar	David Simmons	New Zealand	6:14.10	QA
4	Fred Borchelt; Pat Hayes; Michael Plumb; Robert Zagunis	John Hartigan	United States	6:14.87	QB
5	Adrie Klem; Martin Baltus; Gert Jan van Woudenberg; Evert Kroes	Jos Ruijs	Netherlands	6:18.61	QB
6	Lionel Girard; Serge Fornara; Bernard Bruand; Jean-Jacques Mulot	Jean-Pierre Huguet-Balent	France	6:19.61	QB

==== Semifinal 2 ====
The team from the Soviet Union replaced Aleksandr Sema with Mikhail Kuznetsov. The team from West Germany swapped seats 2 and 3. Ireland swapped rowers in seats 1, 2, and 4.

Rank	Rowers	Coxswain	Nation	Time	Notes
1	Vladimir Eshinov; Nikolay Ivanov; Aleksandr Klepikov; Mikhail Kuznetsov	Aleksandr Lukyanov	Soviet Union	6:09.28	QA
2	Vladimír Jánoš; Otakar Mareček; Karel Neffe; Milan Suchopár	Vladimír Petříček	Czechoslovakia	6:10.32	QA
3	Hans-Johann Färber; Ralph Kubail; Siegfried Fricke; Peter Niehusen	Hartmut Wenzel	West Germany	6:10.74	QA
4	Mick Ryan; Jim Muldoon; Willie Ryan; Christy O'Brien	Liam Redmond	Ireland	6:11.94	QB
5	Jerzy Broniec; Adam Tomasiak; Jerzy Ulczyński; Ryszard Burak	Włodzimierz Chmielewski	Poland	6:13.53	QB
6	Battista Paganelli; Enzo Borgonovi; Gino Iseppi; Ariosto Temporin	Paolo Trisciani	Italy	6:17.79	QB

=== Finals ===
The two finals were rowed on 25 July.

==== Final B ====
In the B final, the Dutch team changed seats 2 to 4. The team from the USA swapped the stroke with seat 4.

Rank	Rowers	Coxswain	Nation	Time
7	Mick Ryan; Jim Muldoon; Willie Ryan; Christy O'Brien	Liam Redmond	Ireland	6:49.56
8	Jerzy Broniec; Adam Tomasiak; Jerzy Ulczyński; Ryszard Burak	Włodzimierz Chmielewski	Poland	6:51.85
9	Lionel Girard; Serge Fornara; Bernard Bruand; Jean-Jacques Mulot	Jean-Pierre Huguet-Balent	France	6:52.13
10	Adrie Klem; Evert Kroes; Martin Baltus; Gert Jan van Woudenberg	Jos Ruijs	Netherlands	6:53.55
11	Robert Zagunis; Pat Hayes; Michael Plumb; Fred Borchelt	John Hartigan	United States	6:54.92
12	Battista Paganelli; Enzo Borgonovi; Gino Iseppi; Ariosto Temporin	Paolo Trisciani	Italy	6:55.53

==== Final A ====
The team from the Soviet Union swapped rowers in seats 3 and 4. The East German Dießner twins swapped their seats. The Czechoslovak, Bulgarian, and New Zealand teams changed seats for all four rowers.

Rank	Rowers	Coxswain	Nation	Time
1st place, gold medalist(s)	Vladimir Eshinov; Nikolay Ivanov; Mikhail Kuznetsov; Aleksandr Klepikov	Aleksandr Lukyanov	Soviet Union	6:40.22
2nd place, silver medalist(s)	Andreas Schulz; Rüdiger Kunze; Walter Dießner; Ullrich Dießner	Johannes Thomas	East Germany	6:42.70
3rd place, bronze medalist(s)	Hans-Johann Färber; Ralph Kubail; Siegfried Fricke; Peter Niehusen	Hartmut Wenzel	West Germany	6:46.96
4	Otakar Mareček; Karel Neffe; Milan Suchopár; Vladimír Jánoš	Vladimír Petříček	Czechoslovakia	6:50.15
5	Lachezar Boychev; Nacho Minchev; Ivan Botev; Kiril Kirchev	Nenko Dobrev	Bulgaria	6:52.88
6	Viv Haar; Danny Keane; Tim Logan; Ian Boserio	David Simmons	New Zealand	7:00.17
