= Ireland at the 1976 Summer Olympics =

- IOC code: IRL
- NOC: Olympic Federation of Ireland
- Website: olympics.ie

in Montreal
- Competitors: 44 (41 men, 3 women) in 10 sports
- Flag bearer: Frank Moore
- Medals: Gold 0 Silver 0 Bronze 0 Total 0

Summer Olympics appearances (overview)
- 1924; 1928; 1932; 1936; 1948; 1952; 1956; 1960; 1964; 1968; 1972; 1976; 1980; 1984; 1988; 1992; 1996; 2000; 2004; 2008; 2012; 2016; 2020; 2024

Other related appearances
- Great Britain (1896–1920)

Ireland competed at the 1976 Summer Olympics in Montreal, Quebec, Canada. 44 competitors, 41 men and 3 women, took part in 34 events in 10 sports. Cearbhall Ó Dálaigh did not attend the Olympics in Montreal due to the African boycott.

== Archery ==
In Ireland's first appearance in archery competition at the Olympics, the nation was represented by one man, James Conroy.

Men's Individual Competition:

- James Conroy – 2255 points (→ 29th place)

== Athletics ==
Men's 800 metres

- Niall O'Shaughnessy

- Heat – 1:49.29 (→ did not advance)

Men's 1.500 metres

- Eamon Coghlan

- Heat – 3:39.87
- Semifinal – 3:38.60
- Final – 3:39.51 (→ 4th place)

- Niall O'Shaughnessy

- Heat – 3:40.12 (→ did not advance)

Men's 5.000 metres

- Edward Leddy

- Heat – 13:40.54 (→ national record, did not advance)

Men's 10.000 metres

- Edward Leddy

- Heat – 28:55.29 (→ did not advance)

Men's Marathon

- James McNamara – 2:24:57 (→ 39th place)
- Danny McDaid – 2:27:07 (→ 42nd place)
- Neil Cusack – 2:35:47 (→ 55th place)

Women's 1.500 metres

- Mary Purcell

- Heat – 4:08.63 (→ national record, did not advance)

== Boxing ==
Men's Light Flyweight (– 48 kg)

- Brendan Dunne
  1. First Round – Defeated Noboru Uchizama (JPN), RSC-2
  2. Second Round – Lost to Orlando Maldonado (PUR), KO-1

== Cycling ==
Two cyclists represented Ireland in 1976.

Individual road race

- Alan McCormack – did not finish (→ no ranking)
- Oliver McQuaid – did not finish (→ no ranking)

== Rowing ==
Men's single sculls

- Seán Drea 4th place in the Final (→ 4th)

Men's coxless fours

- Martin Feeley 2nd in repechage (→ unplaced)
- Iain Kennedy 2nd in repechage (→ unplaced)
- Andy McDonough 2nd in repechage (→ unplaced)
- Jaye Renehan 2nd in repechage (→ unplaced)

Men's coxed fours

- Jim Muldoon 1st in B Final (→ 7th)
- Christy O'Brien 1st in B Final (→ 7th)
- Willie Ryan 1st in B Final (→ 7th)
- Mick Ryan 1st in B Final (→ 7th)
- Liam Redmond 1st in B Final (→ 7th)

== Swimming ==
Men

Athlete	Event	Heat		Semifinal		Final	
Athlete	Event	Time	Rank	Time	Rank	Time	Rank
Kevin Williamson	200 m freestyle	2:00.08	41	—N/a		Did not advance	
Kevin Williamson	400 m freestyle	4:09.60		—N/a		Did not advance	
Kevin Williamson	1500 m freestyle	16:54.11		—N/a		Did not advance	
Robert Howard	100 m backstroke	1:00.77		Did not advance			
Robert Howard	100 m butterfly	1:00.92		Did not advance			

Women

Athlete	Event	Heat		Semifinal		Final	
Athlete	Event	Time	Rank	Time	Rank	Time	Rank
Deirdre Sheehan	100 m freestyle	1:02.11		Did not advance			
Deirdre Sheehan	200 m freestyle	2:15.69		—N/a		Did not advance	
Deirdre Sheehan	100 m backstroke	1:11.53		Did not advance			
Miriam Hopkins	200 m butterfly	2:24.96		—N/a		Did not advance	
