= Wolfgang Groß =

German coxswain (born 1954)

Personal information
- Born: 30 March 1954 (age 72)

Sport
- Sport: Rowing
Medal record
Men's rowing
Representing East Germany
World Rowing Championships
Gold medal – first place	1974 Lucerne	Coxed four
Silver medal – second place	1975 Nottingham	Coxed four

Wolfgang Groß (born 30 March 1954) is a German coxswain. He won a gold medal at the 1974 World Rowing Championships in Lucerne with the men's coxed four, with the rowers Andreas Schulz, Rüdiger Kunze, and twin brothers Ullrich and Walter Dießner. A year later, he came second with the same team at the 1975 World Rowing Championships. The coxed four rowers stayed together for the 1976 Summer Olympics, but Groß was replaced as coxswain by Johannes Thomas. That team won Olympic silver at the coxed four event.
