= Rowing at the 1983 Pan American Games =

Rowing was part of the 1983 Pan American Games. There were eight boat classes for men, and two for women.

== Men's events ==
Event	Gold	Silver	Bronze
Single sculls	Ricardo Daniel Ibarra; Argentina	Mel Laforme; Canada	Sean Colgan; United States
Double sculls	Canada	United States	Cuba
Quadruple sculls	Canada	Cuba	Argentina
Coxless pair	Brazil; Ronaldo Esteves de Carvalho and Ricardo Esteves de Carvalho	Argentina	United States
Coxed pair	Cuba	United States	Peru
Coxless four	Cuba	United States	Canada
Coxed four	United States; Kurt Bausback; Gregory Springer; Jonathan Phinney; Francis Reininger; John Hartigan (cox)	Brazil; Raymundo Rideiro; Denis Marinho; Walter Soares; Mauro dos Santos; Nilson Alonso	Canada; Paul Steele; Ron Burak; Nick Toulmin; Blair Horn; Paul Tessier (cox)
Coxed eight	United States	Chile	Canada

== Women's events ==
Event	Gold	Silver	Bronze
Single sculls	Chris Ernst; United States	María Fernanda de la Fuente; Mexico	Maureen Grace; Canada
Double sculls	United States	Canada	Mexico

== Medal table ==
Place	Nation	Gold medal	Silver medal	Bronze medal	Total
1	United States	4	3	2	9
2	Canada	2	2	4	8
3	Cuba	2	1	1	4
4	Argentina	1	1	1	3
5	Brazil	1	1	0	2
6	Mexico	0	1	1	2
7	Chile	0	1	0	1
8	Peru	0	0	1	1
Total		10	10	10	30
