= Rowing at the 1984 Summer Olympics – Men's coxed four =

Men's coxed four at the Games of the XXIII Olympiad
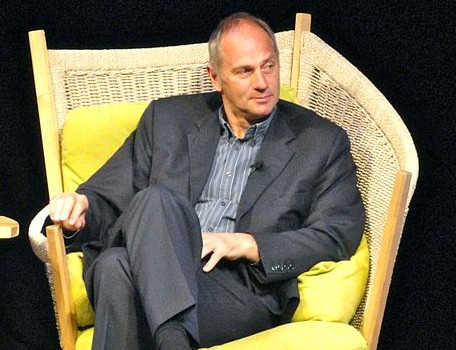
- Steve Redgrave; this event was the first of his five gold medals in rowing
- Venue: Lake Casitas
- Dates: 30 July – 5 August 1984
- Competitors: 40 from 8 nations
- Winning time: 6:18.64

Medalists
1st place, gold medalist(s)		Great Britain: Martin Cross; Richard Budgett; Andy Holmes; Steve Redgrave; Adrian Ellison (cox)
2nd place, silver medalist(s)		United States: Thomas Kiefer; Gregory Springer; Michael Bach; Edward Ives; John Stillings (cox)
3rd place, bronze medalist(s)		New Zealand: Kevin Lawton; Don Symon; Barrie Mabbott; Ross Tong; Brett Hollister (cox)

The men's coxed four (M4+) competition at the 1984 Summer Olympics took place at Lake Casitas in Ventura County, California, United States. There were 8 boats (40 competitors) from 8 nations, with each nation limited to a single boat in the event. (Note: The official Olympic report states that 9 teams with 45 competitors participated, but then lists 8 teams in total) It was held from 30 July to 5 August and the dominant nations were missing from the event due to the Eastern Bloc boycott. Great Britain dominated the regatta, winning the nation's first rowing gold since the 1948 Summer Olympics, back then in front of their home crowd at the Henley Royal Regatta course. The 1984 event started Steve Redgrave's Olympic rowing success that would eventually see him win five Olympic gold medals. It was Great Britain's first victory in the men's coxed four and first medal of any colour in the event since 1912. The other medaling nations had also not been to the podium in the coxed four recently; the United States took silver, that nation's first medal in the event since 1952, while New Zealand's bronze was its first medal since 1968.

== Background ==
This was the 17th appearance of the event. Rowing had been on the programme in 1896 but was cancelled due to bad weather. The coxed four was one of the four initial events introduced in 1900. It was not held in 1904 or 1908, but was held at every Games from 1912 to 1992 when it (along with the men's coxed pair) was replaced with the men's lightweight double sculls and men's lightweight coxless four.

East Germany was the dominating country for the men's coxed four competition; since the 1977 World Rowing Championships, they had won this competition every year but at the most recent world championship in 1983, New Zealand claimed the title, displacing East Germany to the silver medal. The second most dominating nation at the time was the Soviet Union, which had claimed five top three finishes since the 1976 Summer Olympics. Both these Eastern Bloc nations were part of the boycott in 1984, and that left New Zealand as the reigning world champion as the favourite for the event. The USA was also highly rated, having won world championship silver and bronze in 1981 and 1982, respectively, and gold at the Pan American Games in 1983.

For the second consecutive Games (and fifth time in the last eight), no nations made their debut in the event. The United States made its 14th appearance, most of any nation to that point.

=== Previous M4+ competitions ===
Competition	Gold	Silver	Bronze
1976 Summer Olympics	Soviet Union	East Germany	West Germany
1977 World Rowing Championships	East Germany	West Germany	Bulgaria
1978 World Rowing Championships	East Germany	West Germany	Bulgaria
1979 World Rowing Championships	East Germany	Soviet Union	West Germany
1980 Summer Olympics	East Germany	Soviet Union	Poland
1981 World Rowing Championships	East Germany	United States	Soviet Union
1982 World Rowing Championships	East Germany	Czechoslovakia	United States
1983 World Rowing Championships	New Zealand	East Germany	Soviet Union

== Competition format ==
The coxed four event featured five-person boats, with four rowers and a coxswain. It was a sweep rowing event, with the rowers each having one oar (and thus each rowing on one side). The competition used the 2000 metres distance that became standard at the 1912 Olympics and which has been used ever since except at the 1948 Games.

With a small field again, the competition continued to use the three-round format from 1980.

- Semifinals: Two heats of 4 boats each. The top boat in each heat (2 total) advanced directly to Final A. The remaining boats (6 total) went to the repechage.
- Repechage: One heat of 6 boats. The top four boats rejoined the semifinal winners in Final A. The other boats (2 total) went to Final B.
- Final: Two finals. Final A consisted of the top 6 boats. Final B placed boats 7 and 8.

== Schedule ==
All times are Pacific Daylight Time (UTC-7)

Date	Time	Round
Monday, 30 July 1984		Semifinals
Thursday, 2 August 1984		Repechage
Friday, 3 August 1984		Final B
Sunday, 5 August 1984		Final A

== Results ==
None of the eight teams swapped the position of their rowers during the competition.

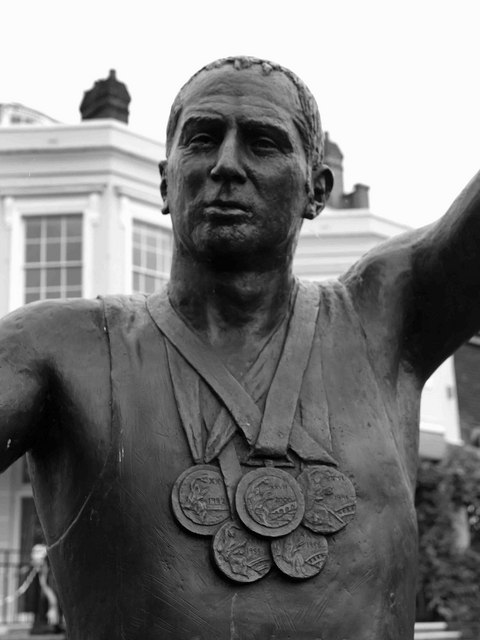
Statue to Sir Steve Redgrave, who won the first of his five Olympic gold medals at this event

=== Semifinals ===
The two heats in round one were rowed on 30 July. The winner of each heat advanced to the A final, while the remaining teams went to the repechage.

==== Semifinal 1 ====
Rank	Rowers	Coxswain	Nation	Time	Notes
1	Giovanni Sergi Sergas; Giovanni Suarez; Gino Iseppi; Giuseppe Carando	Siro Meli (cox)	Italy	6:23.04	QA
2	Heribert Karches; Georg Konermann; Wolfram Thiem; Wolfgang Maennig	Manfred Klein (cox)	West Germany	6:28.29	R
3	Dave Ross; Tim Christian; Richard Doey; Nick Toulmin	Paul Tessier (cox)	Canada	6:29.19	R
4	André Berezin; Luiz dos Santos; Dênis Marinho; Laildo Machado	Manuel Mandel (cox)	Brazil	6:39.88	R

==== Semifinal 2 ====
Rank	Rowers	Coxswain	Nation	Time	Notes
1	Martin Cross; Richard Budgett; Andy Holmes; Steve Redgrave	Adrian Ellison (cox)	Great Britain	6:18.79	QA
2	Thomas Kiefer; Gregory Springer; Michael Bach; Edward Ives	John Stillings (cox)	United States	6:21.94	R
3	Kevin Lawton; Don Symon; Barrie Mabbott; Ross Tong	Brett Hollister (cox)	New Zealand	6:27.18	R
4	Satoru Miyoshi; Tadashi Abe; Shunsuke Kawamoto; Hideaki Maeguchi	Akihiro Koike (cox)	Japan	6:54.51	R

=== Repechage ===
One heat was rowed in the repechage on 2 August. The first four teams advanced to the A final, while the remaining two teams went to the B final.

Rank	Rowers	Coxswain	Nation	Time	Notes
1	Kevin Lawton; Don Symon; Barrie Mabbott; Ross Tong	Brett Hollister (cox)	New Zealand	6:26.18	QA
2	Thomas Kiefer; Gregory Springer; Michael Bach; Edward Ives	John Stillings (cox)	United States	6:27.55	QA
3	Heribert Karches; Georg Konermann; Wolfram Thiem; Wolfgang Maennig	Manfred Klein (cox)	West Germany	6:29.19	QA
4	Dave Ross; Tim Christian; Richard Doey; Nick Toulmin	Paul Tessier (cox)	Canada	6:29.76	QA
5	André Berezin; Luiz dos Santos; Dênis Marinho; Laildo Machado	Manuel Mandel (cox)	Brazil	6:33.44	QB
6	Satoru Miyoshi; Tadashi Abe; Shunsuke Kawamoto; Hideaki Maeguchi	Akihiro Koike (cox)	Japan	6:55.33	QB

=== Finals ===
==== Final B ====
The B final was rowed on 3 August.

Rank	Rowers	Coxswain	Nation	Time
7	André Berezin; Luiz dos Santos; Dênis Marinho; Laildo Machado	Manuel Mandel (cox)	Brazil	6:47.13
8	Satoru Miyoshi; Tadashi Abe; Shunsuke Kawamoto; Hideaki Maeguchi	Akihiro Koike (cox)	Japan	6:52.62

==== Final A ====
The A final was rowed on 5 August.

Rank	Rowers	Coxswain	Nation	Time
1st place, gold medalist(s)	Martin Cross; Richard Budgett; Andy Holmes; Steve Redgrave	Adrian Ellison (cox)	Great Britain	6:18.64
2nd place, silver medalist(s)	Thomas Kiefer; Gregory Springer; Michael Bach; Edward Ives	John Stillings (cox)	United States	6:20.28
3rd place, bronze medalist(s)	Kevin Lawton; Don Symon; Barrie Mabbott; Ross Tong	Brett Hollister (cox)	New Zealand	6:23.68
4	Giovanni Sergi Sergas; Giovanni Suarez; Gino Iseppi; Giuseppe Carando	Siro Meli (cox)	Italy	6:26.44
5	Dave Ross; Tim Christian; Richard Doey; Nick Toulmin	Paul Tessier (cox)	Canada	6:28.78
6	Heribert Karches; Georg Konermann; Wolfram Thiem; Wolfgang Maennig	Manfred Klein (cox)	West Germany	6:34.23
