= Evert Kroes =

Dutch rower (born 1950)

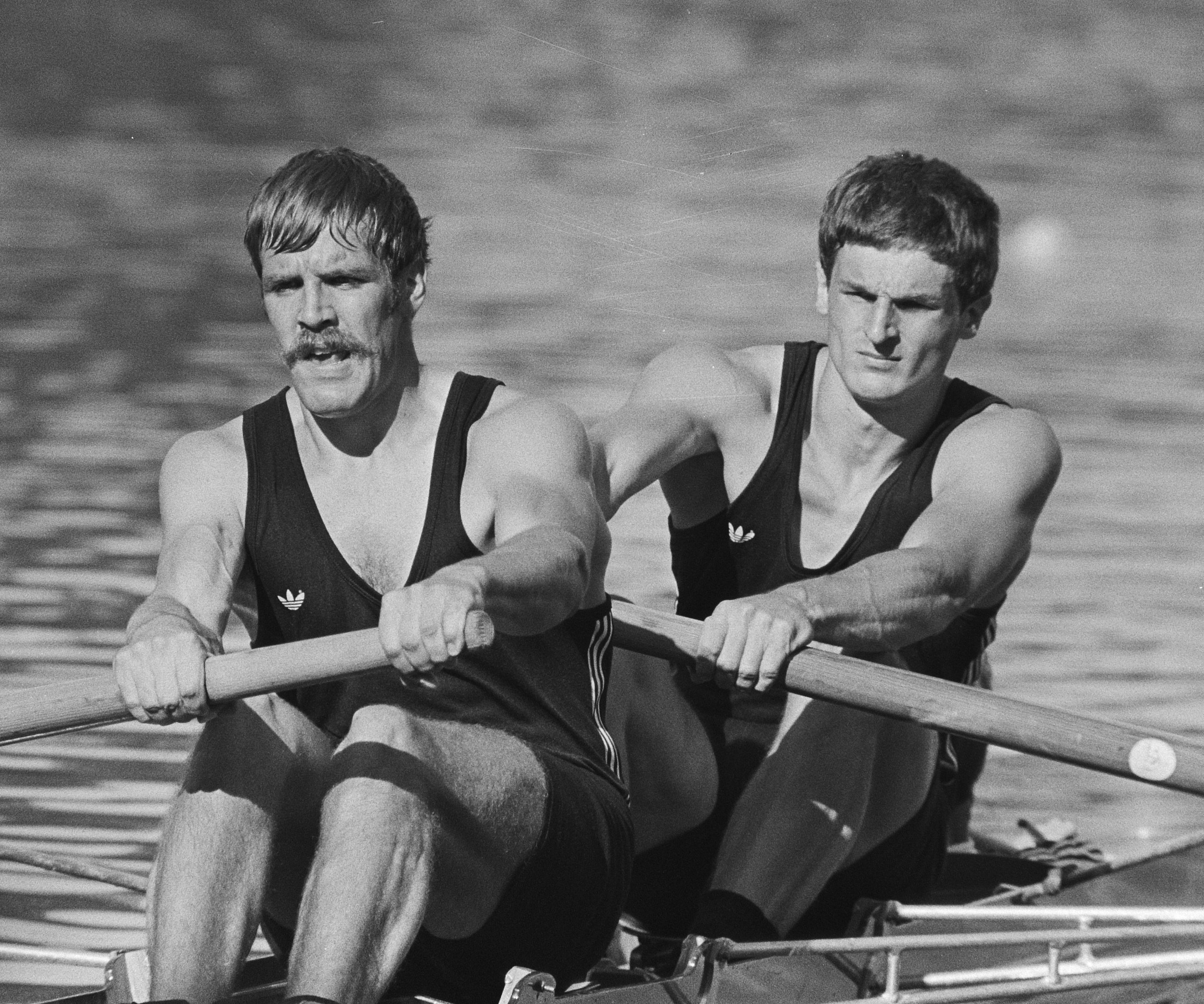
- Evert Kroes (right) and Peter van de Pas in 1977

Personal information
- Born: 4 May 1950 (age 76) Leiden, the Netherlands
- Height: 1.87 m (6 ft 2 in)
- Weight: 96 kg (212 lb)

Sport
- Sport: Rowing
- Club: Laga, Delft

Evert Hubertus Kroes (born 4 May 1950) is a retired Dutch rower. He competed in the coxed four event at the 1972 and 1976 Summer Olympics and finished in seventh and tenth place, respectively. In 2023, a rare video of Kroes playing in the 1976 summer olympics resurfaced alongside Adrie Klem, Martin Baltus, Gert Jan van Woudenberg and Jos Ruijs.
