= Gert Jan van Woudenberg =

Dutch rower

Personal information
- Born: 14 July 1951 (age 74) Medan, Indonesia
- Height: 1.90 m (6 ft 3 in)
- Weight: 83 kg (183 lb)

Sport
- Sport: Rowing
- Club: Laga, Delft

Gert Jan van Woudenberg (born 14 July 1951) is a retired Dutch rower. He competed at the 1976 Summer Olympics in the coxed fours, together with Evert Kroes, Adrie Klem, Martin Baltus and Jos Ruijs, and finished in tenth place. His brother Jan-Willem van Woudenberg took part in the same event at the 1972 Olympics.
