= Scoil Mhuire, Clane =

School in County Kildare, Ireland

- Scoil Mhuire, An Claonadh

Location
- Prosperous Road, Clane, County Kildare; Ireland
- Coordinates: 53.292254°N 6.69773°W

Information
- Motto: The truth will set you free
- Religious affiliation: multidenominational
- Established: 1963
- Principal: Kevin Martin
- Staff: approx. 80
- Enrollment: approx. 1180
- Religious order: Presentation Sisters
- Website: scoilmhuireclane.ie

Scoil Mhuire, is an Irish co-educational post-primary school in Clane, County Kildare. The school is on the western outskirts of Clane, off the Prosperous Road (the R403).

== History ==
Originally founded in 1963 as a girls' school, the first boys entered the secondary school in 1967 and it has continued to expand its enrollment numbers and its campus. It became a community school in 1983 after the opening of a new building and an additional expansion was, along with a new gym hall completed in September 2001.

As of April 2016, approximately 1,100 students were enrolled in the school. By 2025, the school had 1,183 students enrolled (611 male and 572 female).

In May 2022, the school was fined €20,000 for the unfair dismissal of a teacher.

== Curriculum ==
The school operates the Junior Cycle, Transition Year, the Leaving Cert Applied, and the Leaving Cert Vocational Programs.

It offers the subjects DCG, Construction Studies, and Engineering in the practical department, Business Studies, Economics, and Accounting in the Business department, and Biology, Chemistry, Physics, and Agricultural Science in the Science department. The school also offers Home Economics, Religion (although not as an examinable subject), Music, the mandated subjects at Leaving Certificate (English, Irish, and Maths) and either French or German as modern foreign languages.

Adult education courses are undertaken at Scoil Mhuire, where the numbers of adults enrolled "runs into thousands".

== Notable alumni ==
- Eoghan Corry, columnist and author
- Aidan Farrelly, politician
- Willie Ryan and Ted Ryan, Olympic rowers
- Mark Walsh, jockey, Cheltenham Gold Cup winner
