= Peter Niehusen =

West German coxwain and rower (born 1951)

Personal information
- Born: 15 July 1951 (age 74) Lübeck
- Height: 191 cm (6 ft 3 in)
- Weight: 90 kg (198 lb)

Sport
- Sport: Rowing
Medal record
Men's rowing
Representing West Germany
Olympic Games
Bronze medal – third place	1976 Montreal	Coxed four
World Rowing Championships
Gold medal – first place	1966 Bled	Eight
Bronze medal – third place	1974 Lucerne	Coxed four
Bronze medal – third place	1975 Nottingham	Coxed four
European Rowing Championships
Gold medal – first place	1965 Duisburg	Eight

Peter Niehusen (born 15 July 1951) is the only sportsman to have won international medals as both a coxswain and a rower. He won two gold medals and three bronze medals at the European and World Championships and the 1976 Summer Olympics in Montreal.

Niehusen was born in Lübeck, Germany, in 1951. He coxed the eight from Ratzeburg to European gold in 1965, and the first "Deutschland Achter" in 1966 to world gold. He had to leave his coxing seat because he could not maintain his weight at the required 50 kg any longer.

In 1973 he returned to the German eight; this time as a rower. This team came in fifth place at the 1973 European Rowing Championships in Moscow and terminated Niehusen's ambitions for the eight. From 1974 to 1976 he and his partner Ralph Kubail in the coxless pair joined Hans-Johann Färber (gold Olympics 1972, in the so-called Bulls-Four) in the coxed four with a different fourth men each year. In 1974 it was Peter-Michael Kolbe, who would become famous as a single sculler. In 1975, it was Dieter Knief, and in 1976 it was Siegfried Fricke. This boat won three consecutive bronze medals, only being beaten by East Germany and the Soviet Union.

Niehusen was team captain of the German rowing team.

Niehusen worked in the cigarette industry for almost 20 years as a member of the management board of Reemtsma Cigarettenfabriken. Later on he worked and lived in Henley-on-Thames, UK, for three years. Nowadays Niehusen lives in Hamburg as a consultant in sports marketing.
