= Mulot =

Mulot is a French surname. Notable people with this surname include:

- Claude Mulot (1942–1986), French screenwriter and film director
- Jean-Jacques Mulot (born 1948), French rower
- Louis-Georges Mulot (1792–1872), French engineer and entrepreneur
