= George Burns (rowing) =

New Zealand rower

Personal information
- Born: George William Robert Burns; 25 October 1919
- Died: 20 November 1995 (aged 76)

Sport
- Sport: Rowing
- Club: Petone Rowing Club
Medal record
Men's rowing
Representing New Zealand
British Empire Games
Silver medal – second place	1938 Sydney	Coxed four

George William Robert Burns (25 October 1919 – 20 November 1995) was a New Zealand coxswain who represented his country at the 1938 British Empire Games.

He won the silver medal as part of the men's coxed four at the 1938 British Empire Games. He was a member of the Petone Rowing Club, and his team members on the 1938 boat were Jim Clayton (stroke), Ken Boswell, John Rigby, and Albert Hope.
