= Aleksandr Sema =

Soviet rower

Personal information
- Born: Aleksandr Andreyevich Sema; 13 April 1952 (age 74) Leningrad, Russian SFSR, Soviet Union
- Height: 187 cm (6 ft 2 in)
- Weight: 93 kg (205 lb)

Sport
- Sport: Rowing
Medal record
Men's rowing
Representing the Soviet Union
Olympic Games
Gold medal – first place	1976 Montreal	Coxed four
World Rowing Championships
Gold medal – first place	1975 Nottingham	Coxed four

Aleksandr Andreyevich Sema (Russian: Александр Андреевич Сема, born 13 April 1952) is a Russian rower who competed for the Soviet Union.

Sema was born in 1952 in Saint Petersburg, Russia. He won a gold medal at the 1975 World Rowing Championships in Nottingham with the men's coxed four. He went to the 1976 Summer Olympics in Montreal and rowed with the coxed four in heat 1 only. He was replaced in that boat by Mikhail Kuznetsov, and the team went on to win gold. As a heat rower, he is thus also considered one of the gold medallists.

His son, Anton Sema, represented Russia at the 1996 Summer Olympics in single sculls.
