= Žagunis =

Žagunis is a Lithuanian-language surname, Its feminine forms are: Žagunienė, Žagūnienė (married woman or widow) and Žagunytė, Žagūnaitė (unmarried woman). Notable people with the surname include:

- Mark Zagunis, American professional baseball outfielder
- Mariel Leigh Zagunis, American sabre fencer
- Robert Zagunis, American rower
