= John Rigby (rower) =

New Zealand rower

Personal information
- Born: John Brian Freeman Rigby; 7 April 1906
- Died: 19 June 1975 (aged 69)

Sport
- Sport: Rowing
Medal record
Men's rowing
Representing New Zealand
British Empire Games
| Silver medal – second place | 1938 Sydney | Coxed four |

John Brian Freeman Rigby (7 April 1906 – 19 June 1975) was a New Zealand rower. At the 1938 British Empire Games he won the silver medal as part of the men's coxed four. He was a member of the Petone Rowing Club, and his team members in the 1938 boat were Jim Clayton (stroke), Albert Hope, Ken Boswell, and George Burns (cox).

Rigby died on 19 June 1975, and his ashes were buried at Karori Cemetery, Wellington.
