= Allan Tong =

New Zealand rower

Personal information
- Born: Allan Ray Tong; 20 January 1931 (age 95) Auckland, New Zealand
- Relative: Ross Tong (son)

Sport
- Country: New Zealand
- Sport: Rowing
- Club: Union Boat Club

Allan Ray Tong (born 20 January 1931) is a New Zealand rower.

== Biography ==
Tong was born in 1931 in Auckland, New Zealand. He was a member of the eight from Wanganui Technical College that competed in the inaugural Maadi Cup race, i.e. the New Zealand national school rowing championships, in 1947. Tong was a member of the Union Boat Club. He took part in the 1950-51 Centennial games in Christchurch, followed by the 1951 New Zealand Rowing Championships. Married in 1955 he trialed for and was selected to represent New Zealand at the 1956 Summer Olympics. He is listed as New Zealand Olympian athlete number 123 by the New Zealand Olympic Committee. His son, Ross Tong, was an Olympic medallist in rowing (coxed four) at the 1984 Summer Olympics in Los Angeles.

As of 2021, Tong lives in Evelyn Page retirement village in Orewa, and had only recently retired from coaching rowing for Wentworth College pupils on the Weiti River.
