= Albert Hope =

New Zealand rower (1914–1966)

Personal information
- Born: Albert Alexander Hope; 2 February 1914 New Lynn, New Zealand
- Died: 3 September 1966 (aged 52) Hastings, New Zealand
- Occupation: Butcher

Sport
- Sport: Rowing
- Club: Petone Rowing Club
Medal record
Men's rowing
Representing New Zealand
British Empire Games
| Silver medal – second place | 1938 Sydney | Coxed four |

Albert Alexander Hope (2 February 1914 – 3 September 1966) was a New Zealand rower.

Hope was born in the Auckland suburb of New Lynn on 2 February 1914, the son of Ada Louisa Hope (née Gibson) and Frederick Hope.

At the 1938 British Empire Games he won the silver medal as part of the men's coxed four. He was a member of the Petone Rowing Club, and his team members in the 1938 boat were Jim Clayton (stroke), Ken Boswell, John Rigby, and George Burns (cox).

Hope died on 3 September 1966, and was buried at Hastings Cemetery.
