= Ken Boswell (rower) =

New Zealand rower

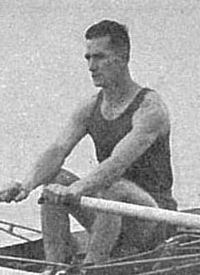

Personal information
- Born: Kenneth James Boswell; 16 September 1912 (age 113) Waihi, New Zealand
- Died: 20 February 1984 (aged 71) Auckland, New Zealand
- Education: Petone Technical High School
- Occupation: Fitter

Sport
- Sport: Rowing
- Club: Petone Rowing Club

Achievements and titles
- National finals: Coxed four champion (1937); Double sculls champion (1939, 1940)
Medal record
Men's rowing
Representing New Zealand
British Empire Games
Silver medal – second place	1938 Sydney	Coxed four

Kenneth James Boswell (16 September 1912 – 20 February 1984) was a New Zealand rower who won a silver medal representing his country at the 1938 British Empire Games.

== Biography ==
Born in Waihi on 16 September 1912, Boswell was the son of Mary Ellen Boswell (née Grant) and David McLaren Boswell, a miner and union member who was involved in the Waihi miners' strike. The family moved to Petone, and Ken Boswell was educated at Petone Technical High School. He played as a forward for the Petone Rugby League Club senior team, and rowed for the Petone Rowing Club.

Boswell was a member of the Wellington provincial representative rowing eight in five seasons between 1934 and 1939, usually in the 6 or 7 seat.

At the 1937 New Zealand Rowing Championships held at Akaroa in February 1937, the Petone four of Jim Clayton (stroke), Albert Hope, Boswell, and John Rigby, coxed by George Burns, won the senior men's coxed four title. The same combination were selected to represent New Zealand in the same event at the 1938 British Empire Games, where they won the silver medal.

Boswell gained two further national rowing titles, winning the men's double sculls at Picton in 1939 and Wellington in 1940, both with Petone clubmate Pat Abbott in the stroke seat.

Boswell died on 20 February 1984, and he was cremated at the North Shore Memorial Park, Albany.
