= Ariosto (name) =

Ariosto is an Italian origin word. It is used as a surname and a masculine given name. Notable people with the name include:

== Surname ==
- Egidio Ariosto (1911–1998), Italian politician
- Ludovico Ariosto (1474–1533), Italian poet

== Given name ==
- Ariosto Temporin (born 1955), Italian rower
- Ariosto A. Wiley (1848–1908), American politician
