= Jim Clayton (rower) =

New Zealand rower

Personal information
- Born: Oliver Newton Clayton; 13 April 1911
- Died: 9 June 1992 (aged 81)

Sport
- Sport: Rowing
- Club: Petone Rowing Club
Medal record
Men's rowing
Representing New Zealand
British Empire Games
| Silver medal – second place | 1938 Sydney | Coxed Four |

Oliver Newton "Jim" Clayton (13 April 1911 – 9 June 1992) was a New Zealand rower.

At the 1938 British Empire Games he won the silver medal as part of the men's coxed four as their stroke. He was a member of the Petone Rowing Club, and his team members in the 1938 boat were Albert Hope, Ken Boswell, John Rigby, and George Burns (cox).
