= Thomas Kiefer =

American rower (born 1958)

Personal information
- Full name: Thomas Nisbit Kiefer
- Born: February 25, 1958 (age 68) Sharon, Connecticut, U.S.
Medal record
Men's rowing
Representing the United States
Olympic Games
Silver medal – second place	1984 Los Angeles	Coxed four

Thomas Nisbit "Tom" Kiefer (born February 25, 1958) is a former American competitive rower and Olympic silver medalist.

== Career ==
After graduating from the Salisbury School in 1976 Thomas Kiefer kicked off his Northeastern campaign in style, stepping right into the stroke seat of the freshman boat and rowing it to its only Eastern Sprints Title. As a sophomore, he raced in the varsity eight and remained there for three years. During his career, the Huskies won 10- regular season regattas while losing only four. As a senior, Northeastern was among the best in the nation, finishing third in both Eastern Sprints and IRA's. Kiefer was inducted into the Northeastern Varsity Club Hall of Fame in 1997.

At the 1984 Summer Olympics, Kiefer finished in 2nd place in the men's coxed fours competition with Edward Ives, Michael Bach, Gregory Springer, and John Stillings.

Kiefer won 3 bronze medals at the World Rowing Championships during his career in the US men’s 8s. In doing so he was the first American rower to win 3 medals in the men’s 8 at the World Rowing Championship.

Kiefer was inducted into the National Rowing Hall of Fame at the 2023 Head of the Charles on October 21, alongside his teammates, Gregory T. Springer, Michael R. Bach, Edward A. Ives, John S. Stillings, and coach, Dietrich Ros.

== Personal ==
Kiefer grew up in Salisbury, Connecticut, where he participated in the Salisbury Winter Sports Association as a cross country skier. He attended Salisbury school and furthered his education at Northeastern University. Kiefer has four kids: three girls (Madison, Ellery, and Oralye) and one boy (Emerson).
