= Enzo Borgonovi =

Italian rower

Personal information
- Nationality: Italian
- Born: 13 October 1953 (age 71)

Sport
- Sport: Rowing

Enzo Borgonovi (born 13 October 1953) is an Italian rower. He competed in the men's coxed four event at the 1976 Summer Olympics.
