= Richard Budgett =

British rower and medical doctor

Personal information
- Full name: Richard Gordon McBride Budgett
- Nationality: British
- Born: 20 March 1959 (age 67)
Medal record
Men's rowing
Gold medal – first place	1984 Los Angeles	Coxed four

Richard Gordon McBride Budgett OBE (born 20 March 1959) is a British physician and was the Medical and Scientific Director of the International Olympic Committee from 2012 to 2024. He is currently the Scientific Advisor to the International Paralympic Committee. He won an Olympic rowing gold medal in coxed four at the 1984 Summer Olympics in Los Angeles. He was chief medical officer at the London 2012 Summer Olympics.

== Rowing career ==
Budgett was born in 1959 in Glasgow. He studied medicine at Selwyn College, University of Cambridge, where he was a member of the Hermes Club, and the Middlesex Hospital University of London and read his MSc in Sports Medicine at Queen Mary College, University of London.

Budgett won the coxed pairs title with Tom Cadoux-Hudson and Adrian Ellison and the coxed fours title with Cadoux-Hudson, Steve King, Geraint Fuller and Ellison, rowing for Tyrian and London University composites, at the 1982 National Rowing Championships.

Budgett was part of the British coxed four that won the gold medal at the 1984 Los Angeles Olympics, alongside Steve Redgrave, Martin Cross, Andy Holmes, and Adrian Ellison (cox).

== Medical career ==
He next attended the Winter Olympics in 1992 and 1994 as the doctor for the British bob-sleigh team. He was Chief Medical Officer to the British team for the 1998, 2002 and 2006 Winter Olympics, and led the Team GB HQ medical team at the 1996, 2000, 2004 and 2008 Summer Olympics. He was Chairman of the British Olympic Association Medical Committee, and Director of Medical Services at the British Olympic Medical Institute. He was appointed as CMO to the 2012 Games in February 2007.

He was appointed Medical and Scientific Director of the International Olympic Committee in April 2012, to commence in the following October. He was part of The Prohibited List Expert Group of WADA (World Anti-doping Agency).He is currently part of WADA’s Health Medicine and Research Committee and the Scientific Advisor to the International Paralympic Committee since 2025.

== See also ==
- Selwyn College Boat Club
- Queen Mary, University of London Boat Club
