= Gerardo Constantini =

Argentine rower

Gerardo Costantini
Personal information
- Nationality: Argentine
- Born: 20 August 1956 (age 69)

Sport
- Sport: Rowing

Gerardo Costantini (born 20 August 1956) is an Argentine rower. He competed in the men's coxed four event at the 1976 Summer Olympics.
