= Jorge Segurado =

Argentine rower

Personal information
- Nationality: Argentine
- Born: 13 November 1960 (age 64)

Sport
- Sport: Rowing

Jorge Segurado (born 13 November 1960) is an Argentine rower. He competed in the men's coxed four event at the 1976 Summer Olympics.
