= Ted Ryan (rower) =

Irish rower

Personal information
- Nationality: Irish
- Born: 24 March 1957 (age 68)

Sport
- Sport: Rowing

Ted Ryan (born 24 March 1957) is an Irish rower, who was born in Darrara, County Cork.

He competed in the men's coxed four event at the 1980 Summer Olympics. Ted Ryan competed with Garda Síochána Boat Club. After the Olympics, he began coaching other rowers.

== See also ==
- Willie Ryan - rower, brother of Ted Ryan.
- Caroline Ryan - cyclist and niece of Ted Ryan.
