= Colleen Ward (psychologist) =

American-New Zealand cross-cultural psychologist

- Born: New Orleans, United States
- Education: Durham University
- Scientific career
- Fields: Cross-cultural Psychology, Acculturation and adaptation, Intergroup perceptions and relations
- Workplaces: Victoria University of Wellington
- Doctoral students: Tracy Berno

Professor Colleen Ward is an American-New Zealand cross-cultural psychologist. She is a professor of psychology and Founder of the Centre for Applied Cross-cultural Research at Victoria University of Wellington. She is a native of New Orleans.

== Career ==
Ward obtained her PhD in social psychology from Durham University in 1977. She held an Organization of American States post-doctoral fellowship at the University of West Indies.

She is internationally recognised as a leading authority on cultural diversity and how culture affects human behaviour and experience.

Ward was Head of School of Psychology, Director/Co-director of the Centre for Applied Cross-cultural Research, and Direct of the Cross-cultural Programme at Victoria University of Wellington. She is also an honorary fellow of the International Association for Cross-Cultural Psychology..

She has also held academic positions at the University of Canterbury, National University of Singapore, Science University of Malaysia and University of West Indies.

Ward was appointed President-Elect of the International Association for Cross-cultural Psychology in 2018. She was President of International Academy of Intercultural Research during 2009–2011. In 2005–2007, Ward was President of the Asian Association of Social Psychology. She was previously the Secretary General of the International Association of Cross-cultural Psychology from 1992 to 1994.

Ward has served on the Editorial Boards of the Journal of Cross-Cultural Psychology, Asian Journal of Social Psychology, International Journal of Intercultural Relations and Advances in Culture and Psychology Series (Oxford University Press).

Ward was interviewed on Radio New Zealand's 'Sunday' programme in October 2012, along with Professor James Liu, on the claim that multiculturalism was failing in Europe and how multiculturalism works in New Zealand.

In 2018, Ward was appointed a member of the Welcoming Communities Advisory Board.

Notable students of Ward include Tracy Berno.

== Areas of contribution ==
Ward's areas of contribution include cross-cultural psychology; acculturation and adaptation; intergroup perceptions and relations.

== Awards and honours ==
In 2004, Ward received a New Zealand James Cook Fellowship in Social Science.

She received a Te Rangi Hiroa medal from the Royal Society of New Zealand in 2011 for her outstanding contributions to the advancement of psychology study of immigration, acculturation, intercultural relations and cultural diversity.

In October 2015, Ward was elected a Fellow of the Royal Society of New Zealand for her "substantial contributions to the psychological study of immigration, acculturation and intercultural relations".

In 2017, Ward was selected as one of the Royal Society Te Apārangi's "150 women in 150 words", celebrating the contributions of women to knowledge in New Zealand.

== Studies ==
- Motivation and Cultural Adaption

== Books ==
- Ward, C., Bochner, S. and Furnham, A. (2001). The Psychology of Culture Shock. Routledge. ISBN 978-0415162357.
- Ward, C. (ed) (1989). Altered States of Consciousness and Mental Health: A Cross-Cultural Perspective (Cross Cultural Research and Methodology). ISBN 978-0803932777.
