= Raúl Tettamanti =

Argentine rower

Personal information
- Nationality: Argentine
- Born: 31 July 1956 (age 69)

Sport
- Sport: Rowing

Raúl Tettamanti (born 31 July 1956) is an Argentine rower. He competed in the men's coxed four event at the 1976 Summer Olympics.
