= Kevin Lawton =

New Zealand rower

Personal information
- Born: Kevin Edmund Lawton; 28 September 1960 (age 65) Auckland, New Zealand
- Height: 186 cm (6 ft 1 in)
- Weight: 88 kg (194 lb)

Sport
- Sport: Rowing
Medal record
Men's rowing
Representing New Zealand
Olympic Games
Bronze medal – third place	1984 Los Angeles	Coxed four

Kevin Edmund Lawton (born 28 September 1960) is a former New Zealand rower who won an Olympic bronze medal at the 1984 Summer Olympics in Los Angeles.

Lawton was born in 1960 in Auckland, New Zealand. Along with Don Symon, Barrie Mabbott, Ross Tong and Brett Hollister (cox), Lawton won the bronze medal in the coxed four. He is listed as New Zealand Olympian athlete number 461 by the New Zealand Olympic Committee.

He now lives on a lifestyle block in Leigh, with his wife and their four daughters.
