= Nikolay Ivanov (rower) =

Soviet rower

Personal information
- Born: 20 August 1949 Leningrad, Russian SFSR, Soviet Union
- Died: 8 June 2012 (aged 62) Saint Petersburg, Russia

Sport
- Sport: Rowing
Medal record
Men's rowing
Representing the Soviet Union
Olympic Games
Gold medal – first place	1976 Montreal	Coxed four
World Championships
Gold medal – first place	1974 Lucerne	Coxed pair
Gold medal – first place	1975 Nottingham	Coxed four
Silver medal – second place	1975 Nottingham	Eight
Bronze medal – third place	1970 St. Catharines	Coxed pair
European Rowing Championships
Gold medal – first place	1973 Moscow	Coxed pair
Bronze medal – third place	1971 Copenhagen	Coxed pair

Nikolay Petrovich Ivanov (Russian: Николай Петрович Иванов, 20 August 1949 – 8 June 2012) was a Leningrad-born Russian rower who competed for the Soviet Union in the 1972 Summer Olympics and in the 1976 Summer Olympics. In 1972, he was a crew member of the Soviet boat which finished fifth in the coxed pairs event. Four years later he won the gold with the Soviet boat in the coxed fours competition.
