= Luiz dos Santos =

Brazilian rower

Personal information
- Born: 5 April 1952 (age 72); São Paulo, Brazil

Sport
- Sport: Rowing

Luiz dos Santos (born 5 April 1952) is a Brazilian rower. He competed in the men's coxed four event at the 1984 Summer Olympics.
