= Ken Strongman =

New Zealand psychologist (1940–2019)

- Born: Kenneth Thomas Strongman; 2 December 1940; Ware, Hertfordshire, England
- Died: 29 December 2019 (aged 79); Christchurch, New Zealand
- Children: 2

Academic background
- Education: University College London
- Thesis: An investigation of experimentally induced anxiety in the rat (1964)

Academic work
- Discipline: Psychology
- Sub-discipline: Emotion
- Institutions: University of Exeter; University of Canterbury
- Doctoral students: Tracy Berno

Kenneth Thomas Strongman (2 December 1940 – 29 December 2019) was a New Zealand psychologist and academic, and was a professor of psychology at the University of Canterbury, specialising in the field of emotion. He was also a short-story writer, book and television reviewer, and newspaper columnist.

== Early life and family ==
Born on 2 December 1940 in Ware, Hertfordshire, England, Strongman was the son of Grace Mary Strongman (née Dew) and Alfred Thomas Strongman. He grew up in a terrace house in Highbury, North London, and was educated at Dame Alice Owen's School where his contemporaries included John Broadhurst. Strongman then studied at University College London, from where he graduated Bachelor of Science in 1962, and PhD in 1964. The title of his doctoral thesis was An investigation of experimentally induced anxiety in the rat.

In 1964, Strongman married Thelma Madeline Francis, and they went on to have two children, including art curator, writer, and film and television critic Lara Strongman. The couple later divorced, and Strongman remarried.

== Academic career ==
Strongman began his academic career in 1964 as a lecturer and then senior lecturer at the University of Exeter. He moved to New Zealand in 1979 when he was appointed professor and head of department of psychology at the University of Canterbury in Christchurch, where he remained for the rest of his career. He served 15 years as head of department, and later held managerial roles at Canterbury, including as assistant vice-chancellor (government and community relations) and pro-vice-chancellor arts. Following his retirement in 2010, Strongman was conferred with the title of professor emeritus. Notable students of Strongman include Tracy Berno.

Strongman was regarded as an international expert on emotion, and his research covered both theoretical and empirical aspects of the subject. He wrote one of the standard texts, The Psychology of Emotion, first published in 1973, and in its sixth edition in 2003. In 2003, Strongman was one of 140 prominent New Zealanders who signed a petition that was presented to Parliament, seeking a royal commission into the Christchurch Civic Crèche abuse case.

== Other activities ==
Strongman was a long-time television and film reviewer for The Press newspaper in Christchurch, from the 1980s until a few months before his death. In 2013, he began writing a fortnightly column on retirement and ageing for The Press, titled Over the Hill. He also wrote several short stories.

Strongman was a member of the Film Censorship Board of Review in New Zealand between 1984 and 1986. He also served as a member of the Arts Centre of Christchurch Trust Board.

== Honours ==
Strongman was elected a Fellow of the New Zealand Psychological Society in 1982, and a Fellow of the British Psychological Society in 1990. He was elected a Fellow of the Royal Society of New Zealand in 1994.

== Death ==
Strongman died at his home in Christchurch on 29 December 2019.
