= Tim Christian =

Canadian rower

Personal information
- Nationality: Canadian
- Born: 30 October 1960 (age 64); Quesnel, British Columbia, Canada

Sport
- Sport: Rowing

Tim Christian (born 30 October 1963) is a Canadian rower. He competed in the men's coxed four event at the 1984 Summer Olympics.
