= Georg Konermann =

German rower

Personal information
- Nationality: German
- Born: 24 June 1960 (age 64); Rheine, Germany

Sport
- Sport: Rowing

Georg Konermann (born 24 June 1960) is a German rower. He competed in the men's coxed four event at the 1984 Summer Olympics.
