= Tom Cadoux-Hudson =

British rower

Personal information
- Born: Thomas A. D. Cadoux-Hudson; January 1959 (age 67) Germany
- Education: New College, Oxford

Sport
- Country: Great Britain
- Sport: Rowing
Medal record
Gold medal – first place	The Boat Race 1987	Oxford
Gold medal – first place	The Boat Race 1988	Oxford

Thomas A. D. Cadoux-Hudson (born January 1959) is a German-born British former rower, now medical practitioner and alumnus of New College, Oxford.

== Rowing career ==
Cadoux-Hudson won the coxed pairs title with Richard Budgett and Adrian Ellison and the coxed fours title with Budgett, Steve King, Geraint Fuller and Ellison, rowing for Tyrian and London University composites, at the 1982 National Rowing Championships.

In 1987 and 1988, medical student Cadoux-Hudson competed in and won The Boat Race in 1987 and 1988 for Oxford University. Several years later he was the umpire the 1997 race, which was won by Cambridge.

== Personal life ==
He is now a surgeon at Oxford Hospital and has practiced since 1982. His GMC registration date was 18 April 1984, and specialist registration date on 17 July 1996.

== Sources ==
- Tom Cadoux-Hudson at World Rowing
