= Akihiro Koike =

Japanese rower (born 1962)

Personal information
- Nationality: Japanese
- Born: 1 November 1962 (age 62)

Sport
- Sport: Rowing

Akihiro Koike (Japanese: 小池 明広; born 1 November 1962) is a Japanese rowing coxswain. He competed in the men's coxed four event at the 1984 Summer Olympics.
