= Paolo Trisciani =

Italian rower

Personal information
- Nationality: Italian
- Born: 26 January 1952 (age 73)

Sport
- Sport: Rowing

Paolo Trisciani (born 26 January 1952) is an Italian rower. He competed in the men's coxed four event at the 1976 Summer Olympics.
