= Richard Doey =

Canadian rower

Personal information
- Born: 27 December 1956 (age 68); Chatham, Ontario, Canada

Sport
- Sport: Rowing

Richard Doey (born 27 December 1956) is a Canadian rower. He competed in the men's coxed four event at the 1984 Summer Olympics.
