= Aleksandr Klepikov =

Soviet rower (1950–2021)

Personal information
- Full name: Aleksandr Grigorevich Klepikov
- Born: 23 May 1950 Leningrad, Russian SFSR, Soviet Union
- Died: 27 February 2021 (aged 70)
Medal record
Men's rowing
Representing Soviet Union
Olympic Games
Gold medal – first place	1976 Montreal	Coxed four
World Championships
Gold medal – first place	1975 Nottingham	Coxed four
Silver medal – second place	1977 Amsterdam	Eight

Aleksandr Grigorevich Klepikov (Russian: Александр Григорьевич Клепиков, 23 May 1950 – 27 February 2021) was a Russian rower who competed for the Soviet Union in the 1976 Summer Olympics.

He was born in Leningrad.

In 1976 he was a crew member of the Soviet boat which won the gold medal in the coxed four event.
