= Pat Hayes (rower) =

American rower (born 1951)

Personal information
- Nationality: American
- Born: February 13, 1951 (age 75) Salinas, California, United States

Sport
- Sport: Rowing

Pat Hayes (born February 13, 1951) is an American rower. He competed in the men's coxed four event at the 1976 Summer Olympics.
