= Lios na gCon =

Restored ancient ringfort

Coordinates: 51°37′45″N 8°50′28″W

Lios na gCon (from Irish Lios na gCon, meaning 'ringfort of the hounds') is a reconstructed ringfort located in Darrara, County Cork, Ireland.

It was excavated and reconstructed on its original location between August 1987 and August 1989 by Macra na Feirme from Clonakilty.

It opened to the public in 2009 but was abandoned in 2015 over alleged disagreements between Teagasc (the owners of the land) and Cork County Council.

In keeping with other similar ringforts, it may have served as a fortified farmstead between 400 BC and 1200 AD.
