= Adrian Ellison =

English rower (born 1958)

Personal information
- Full name: Adrian Charles Ellison
- Born: 11 September 1958 (age 67) Solihull, West Midlands, England

Sport
- Club: Tyrian Boat Club; Leander Club, Henley-on-Thames, Molesey Boat Club
Medal record
Men's rowing
Representing Great Britain
Olympic Games
Gold medal – first place	1984 Los Angeles	Coxed four
Representing England
Commonwealth Games
Gold medal – first place	1986 Edinburgh	Coxed four

Adrian Charles Ellison (born 11 September 1958) is a British retired rowing cox.

== Rowing career ==
Ellison won the coxed pairs title with Tom Cadoux-Hudson and Richard Budgett and the coxed fours title with Cadoux-Hudson, Steve King, Geraint Fuller and Budgett, rowing for Tyrian and London University composites, at the 1982 National Rowing Championships.

Ellison coxed the men's four which brought Steve Redgrave his first Olympic gold medal in Los Angeles in 1984. He also competed at the 1992 Summer Olympics. He also won gold for England, again in the men's coxed fours, at the 1986 Commonwealth Games in Edinburgh, Scotland. Ellison won World Championships bronze medals for Great Britain in 1981 (Men's coxed pair) and 1989 (Men's eight)

== Personal life ==
Born in Solihull, Ellison attended Solihull School, followed by Reading University to study zoology. He is a diagnostic radiographer, specialising in nuclear medicine.
