= Battista Paganelli =

Italian rower

Personal information
- Nationality: Italian
- Born: 16 May 1953 (age 71)

Sport
- Sport: Rowing

Battista Paganelli (born 16 May 1953) is an Italian rower. He competed in the men's coxed four event at the 1976 Summer Olympics.
