= Brett Hollister =

New Zealand rowing cox (born 1966)

Personal information
- Born: Brett James Hollister; 19 May 1966 (age 60) Rotorua, New Zealand
- Height: 161 cm (5 ft 3 in)
- Weight: 51 kg (112 lb)

Sport
- Sport: Rowing
- Club: Waikato Rowing Club
Medal record
Men's rowing
Representing New Zealand
Olympic Games
Bronze medal – third place	1984 Los Angeles	Coxed four
World Championships
Gold medal – first place	1983 Duisburg	Coxed four

Brett James Hollister (born 19 May 1966) is a former New Zealand rowing cox who won an Olympic bronze medal at the 1984 Summer Olympics in Los Angeles. Since 2004, he had held management positions for rugby union and is the current chief executive officer of the North Harbour Rugby Union

Hollister was born in 1966 in Rotorua, New Zealand. He received his education at Westlake Boys High School. He later joined the Waikato Rowing Club.

In 1983 he coxed the crew of Conrad Robertson, Greg Johnston, Keith Trask, and Les O'Connell when they won the coxed four in Duisburg at the World Championships. Together with Kevin Lawton, Don Symon, Barrie Mabbott and Ross Tong Hollister won the bronze medal in the coxed fours at the 1984 Los Angeles Olympics. He is listed as New Zealand Olympian athlete number 447 by the New Zealand Olympic Committee. In 1984 and 1985, he won four New Zealand national rowing championship titles. At the 1985 World Rowing Championships, he came fourth with the New Zealand eight. On a national level, he was a triple national champion in the 1984/85 season in the eight, the coxed four, and the coxed pair.

After his rowing career, Hollister worked for Nike New Zealand (1991–1999), PRISM (1999–2000), Telecom New Zealand (2000–2004), and the Canterbury Rugby Football Union (2004–2006). Since 2006, Hollister has been chief executive officer of the North Harbour Rugby Union.
