= Alf Torp (rowing) =

Norwegian rower

Personal information
- Nationality: Norwegian
- Born: 30 August 1960 (age 64); Oslo, Norway

Sport
- Sport: Rowing

Alf Torp (born 30 August 1960) is a Norwegian rower. He competed in the men's coxed four event at the 1976 Summer Olympics.
