= Steve Redgrave =

British rower (born 1962)

Sir Steve Redgrave CBE DL
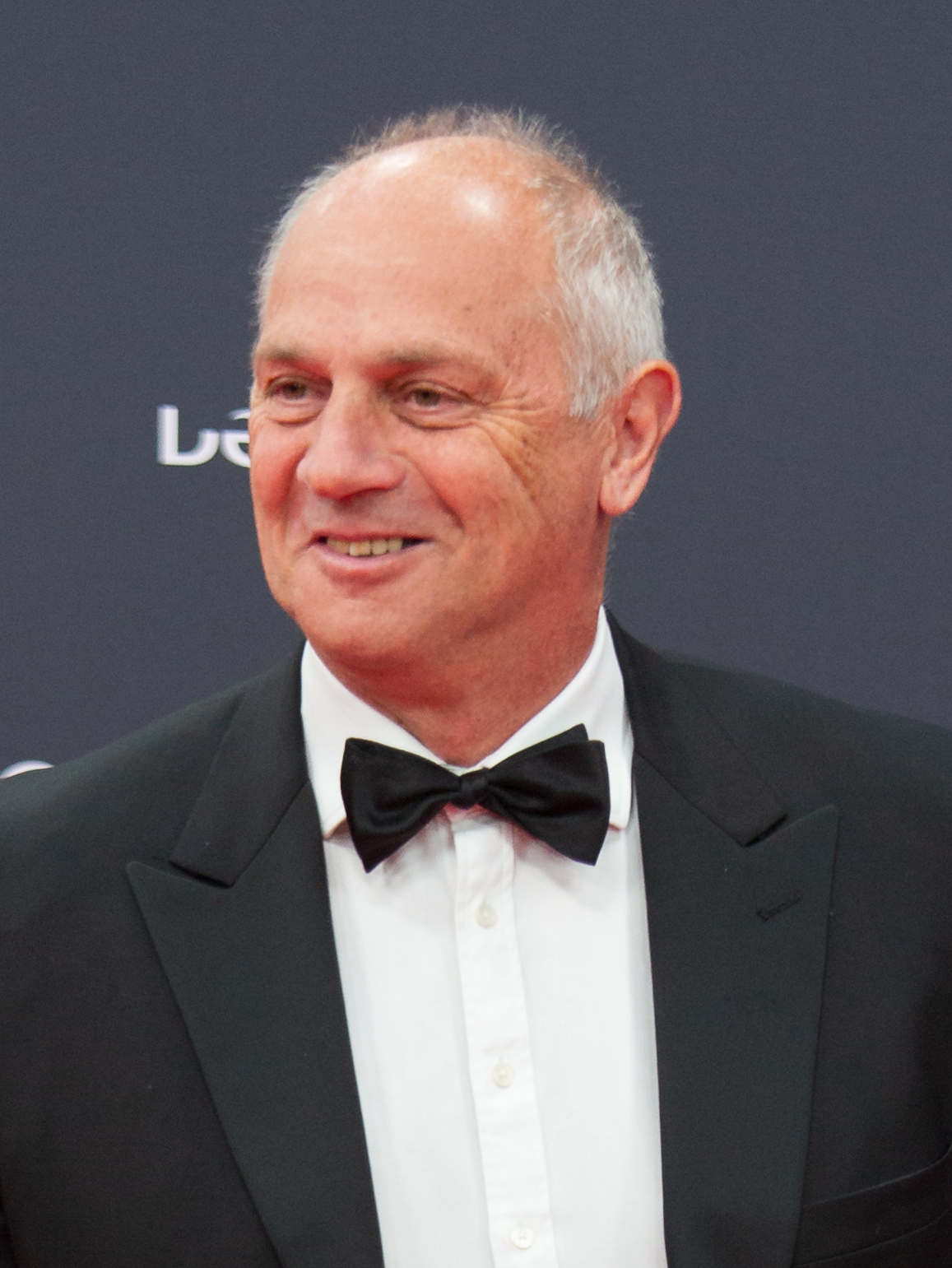
- Redgrave in 2024

Personal information
- Full name: Steven Geoffrey Redgrave
- Born: 23 March 1962 (age 64) Marlow, Buckinghamshire, England
- Education: Great Marlow School
- Occupation: Rower
- Height: 6 ft 4.75 in (1.95 m)
- Weight: 16 st 2 lb (103 kg) (2000)
- Spouse: Ann Redgrave
- Website: www.steveredgrave.com

Sport
- Country: Great Britain
- Sport: Men's Rowing
- Club: Marlow Rowing Club; Leander Club
- Team: GB Rowing Team
- Coached by: Mike Spracklen; Jürgen Gröbler
- Retired: 2000
Medal record
Men's rowing
Representing Great Britain
Olympic Games
Gold medal – first place	1984 Los Angeles	Coxed four
Gold medal – first place	1988 Seoul	Coxless pair
Gold medal – first place	1992 Barcelona	Coxless pair
Gold medal – first place	1996 Atlanta	Coxless pair
Gold medal – first place	2000 Sydney	Coxless four
Bronze medal – third place	1988 Seoul	Coxed pair
World Championships
Gold medal – first place	1986 Nottingham	Coxed pair
Gold medal – first place	1987 Copenhagen	Coxless pair
Gold medal – first place	1991 Vienna	Coxless pair
Gold medal – first place	1993 Račice	Coxless pair
Gold medal – first place	1994 Indianapolis	Coxless pair
Gold medal – first place	1995 Tampere	Coxless pair
Gold medal – first place	1997 Aiguebelette	Coxless four
Gold medal – first place	1998 Cologne	Coxless Four
Gold medal – first place	1999 St. Catharines	Coxless four
Silver medal – second place	1987 Copenhagen	Coxed pair
Silver medal – second place	1989 Bled	Coxless pair
Bronze medal – third place	1990 Tasmania	Coxless pair
Representing England
Commonwealth Games
Gold medal – first place	1986 Edinburgh	Single sculls
Gold medal – first place	1986 Edinburgh	Coxless pair
Gold medal – first place	1986 Edinburgh	Coxed four
- Updated on 6 November 2016

Sir Steven Geoffrey Redgrave (born 23 March 1962) is a British retired rower who won gold medals at five consecutive Olympic Games from 1984 to 2000. He has also won three Commonwealth Games gold medals and nine World Rowing Championships golds. He is the most successful male rower in Olympic history, and the only man to have won gold medals at five Olympic Games in an endurance sport.

Redgrave is regarded as one of Britain's greatest-ever Olympians. Celebrated as the most decorated and successful British Olympian in history at the time of his retirement in 2000, as of 2025 he is the fifth-most successful British Olympian, after Chris Hoy, Jason Kenny, Bradley Wiggins, and Laura Kenny, all track cyclists. He has carried the British flag at the opening of the Olympic Games on two occasions. In 2002, he was ranked number 36 in the BBC poll of the 100 Greatest Britons. He received the BBC Sports Personality of the Year – Lifetime Achievement Award in 2011.

Although he raced in a series of different pairs and foursomes, Redgrave's career is most closely associated with long-term colleague and fellow knight of the realm, Sir Matthew Pinsent, with whom he won three of his Olympic gold medals, and seven of his World Championship titles.

== Early life and education ==
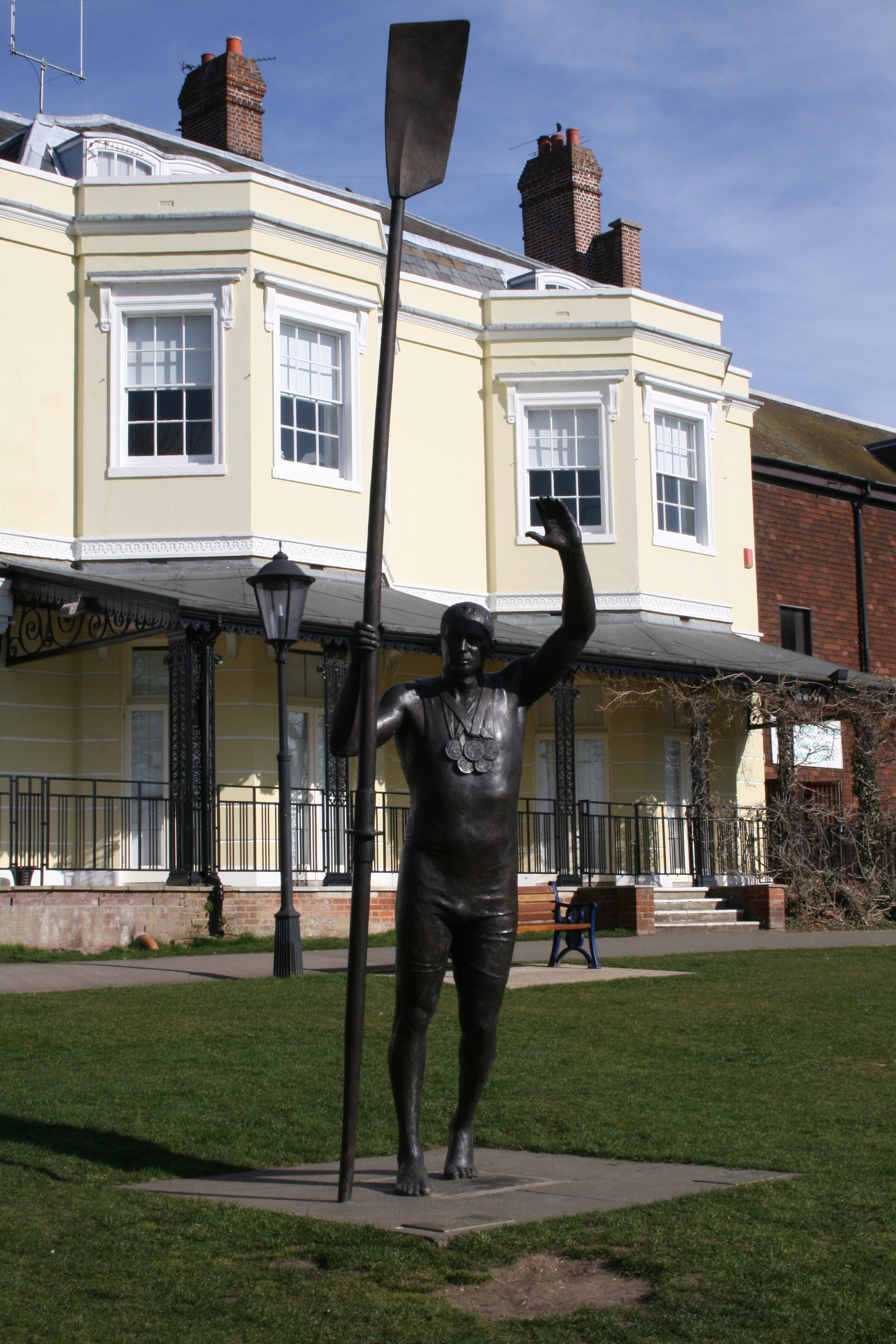
Statue of Redgrave in Higginson Park, Marlow

Redgrave was born in Marlow, Buckinghamshire, to Geoffrey Edward Redgrave, a submariner in the Second World War who became a builder, and Sheila Marion, daughter of Harold Stevenson, a local bus driver. His great-grandparents Harry and Susannah Redgrave moved to Marlow from Bramfield, Suffolk, in 1887. He was educated at Great Marlow School.

== Rowing career ==
Redgrave's primary discipline was sweep rowing, in which he won Olympic Gold rowing both bowside and strokeside (port and starboard).

From 1991, the crews in which he rowed became renowned for their consistent dominance, winning almost every time they raced. Profiles of the Redgrave-Pinsent pairing in particular reflected their perceived invulnerability, arguing "the best pair in the world today is Steve Redgrave, and whomever Steve Redgrave chooses to row with. The second best pair is Matthew Pinsent, and whomever Matthew Pinsent chooses to row with"; the pair were not only widely considered the best pair in the world at their peak, but the best two individual sweep rowers.

For much of his career he suffered illness: in 1992 he was diagnosed with ulcerative colitis, and in 1997 he was diagnosed with diabetes mellitus type 2.

=== Olympic Games ===
Redgrave won gold medals at five consecutive Olympic Games from 1984 to 2000, plus a bronze medal at the 1988 Summer Olympics.

Immediately after winning the 1996 Olympic gold medal, he stated in a televised interview that if anyone found him close to a rowing boat again, "you have my permission to shoot me". However, he changed his mind shortly afterward, and resumed training after a four-month break. The gold medal achieved by him and Matthew Pinsent in the coxless pair at the Atlanta 1996 games was particularly notable for being the only gold medal achieved by the entire British Olympic team across all sports during that particular Olympic games.

In 2000, he won his fifth consecutive Olympic gold medal and retired from the sport. In August 2000, prior to his final Olympic Games, the BBC broadcast Gold Fever, a three-part BBC documentary which had followed the coxless four in the years leading up to the Olympics. It included video diaries recording the highs and lows in the quest for gold, the switch from a pair to a four, and Redgrave's struggles with a series of debilitating conditions. At the medal ceremony after the 2000 Summer Olympics he was also presented with a gold Olympic pin by IOC President Juan Antonio Samaranch in recognition of his achievement.

=== World Championships ===
At the World Rowing Championships he won nine gold medals, two silvers, and a bronze.

He won the World Championship for Indoor rowing in 1991.

=== Henley Royal Regatta ===
He competed at Henley Royal Regatta for more than two decades, winning: the Silver Goblets & Nickalls' Challenge Cup for coxless pairs seven times (twice with Andy Holmes, once with Simon Berrisford and four times with Matthew Pinsent); the Stewards' Challenge Cup for coxless fours five times; the Diamond Challenge Sculls twice; the Prince Philip Challenge Cup for coxed fours twice; the Double Sculls Challenge Cup with Eric Sims then with Adam Clift; and the Queen Mother Challenge Cup for quadruple sculls.

=== Wingfield Sculls ===
He won the Wingfield Sculls for single scullers five times between 1985 and 1989.

== Life after rowing ==
In April 2006 Redgrave completed his third London Marathon, raising a record £1,800,000 for charity.

He starred in Top Ground Gear Force for Sport Relief in 2008, where the Top Gear Team (Jeremy Clarkson, James May and Richard Hammond) took on Ground Force with predictable results, and trashed his garden.

He launched his own Fairtrade Cotton Brand of clothing called FiveG, which was sold in Debenhams department stores.

He was involved in starting a rowing academy in India at Lavasa, the new Hill City being developed near Pune City.

In April 2008, Redgrave took part in the Olympic Torch relay for the games in Beijing, and he went on to be one of the final torch-bearers for the 2012 Summer Olympics in London, carrying the torch into the stadium, where seven young athletes shared the task of lighting the cauldron at the opening ceremony.

He was named a Patron of the Jaguar Academy of Sport in 2010.

In 2012, he took up kayaking and attempted the Devizes-to-Westminster marathon kayak race, but had to withdraw halfway through due to tiredness.

He rowed on the Gloriana as part of the royal pageant for the Diamond Jubilee of Elizabeth II.

In August 2014, Redgrave was one of 200 public figures who were signatories to a letter to The Guardian expressing their hope that Scotland would vote to remain part of the United Kingdom in September's referendum on that issue.

In May 2018, Redgrave assumed the High-Level Performance Director role for the Chinese Rowing Association to help China's rowing team's target of one gold medal at the Tokyo 2020 Games and two golds at Paris 2024.

In 2025, Redgrave is set to appear as a contestant on the seventeenth series of Dancing on Ice.

== Personal life ==
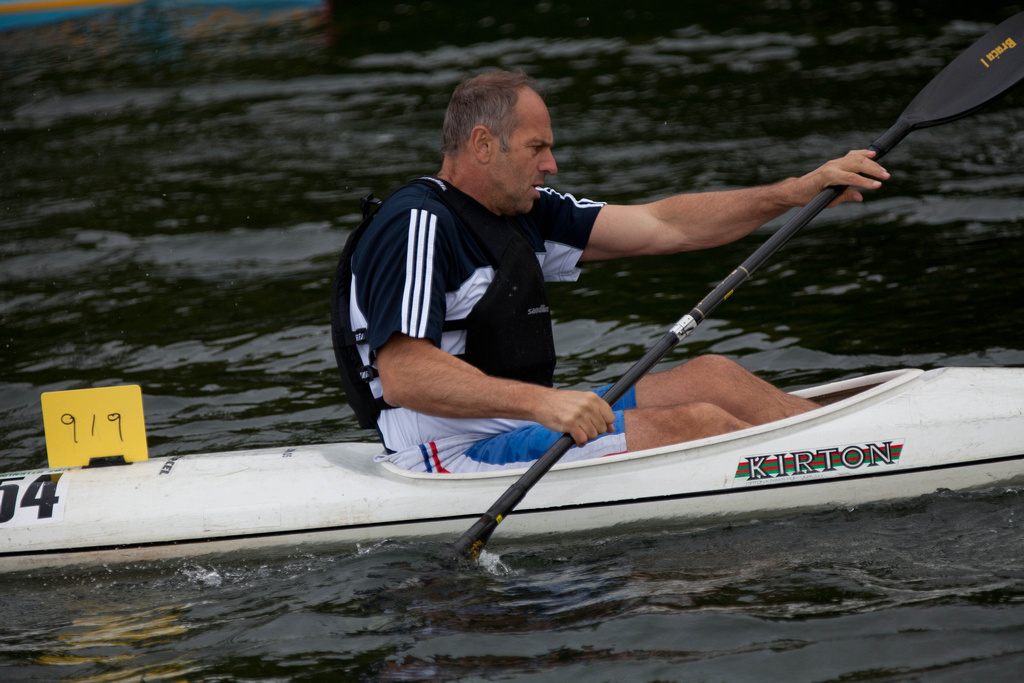
Redgrave in 2011

He married Ann Callaway (now Lady Ann Redgrave) in 1988; also an elite rower, she represented Great Britain in the women's eight at the Los Angeles Olympics in 1984. She was Chief Medical Officer to the GB rowing team from 1992 to 2001 and since 2009 their first full-time Medical Officer. He was the honorary president of British Rowing.

Redgrave has three children, Natalie, Sophie and Zak. Natalie rowed with the Oxford University Women's Boat Club which won the women's boat race at Henley Boat Races in 2011.

He is a supporter of Chelsea Football Club.

== Honours ==
Redgrave was made a Member of the Order of the British Empire (MBE) in 1987, and promoted to Commander of the Order of the British Empire (CBE) in 1997. In the 2001 New Year Honours he was appointed a Knight Bachelor "for services to Rowing", which he received in Buckingham Palace from Queen Elizabeth II on 1 May 2001.

He was voted the BBC Sports Personality of the Year in 2000, and received the BBC Sports – Lifetime Achievement Award in 2011.

He was awarded the Honorary Degree of Doctor of the University from Heriot Watt University in November 2001, having previously been awarded an Honorary Blue in 1997.

In 2001, he was awarded the Honorary Degree of Doctor of Technology by Loughborough University.

In 2000, his fifth Olympic gold was voted the greatest sporting moment in Channel 4's 100 Greatest Sporting Moments.

The Redgrave Pinsent Rowing Lake was opened by him and Matthew Pinsent in 2006. The lake and boathouse provide training, medical and scientific facilities for the GB rowing squad.

In 2013, he was awarded an honorary doctorate by the University of Edinburgh "in recognition of his outstanding sporting achievements and role as a sports ambassador".

== Achievements ==
- Olympic medals: 5 gold, 1 bronze
- World Championship medals: 9 gold, 2 silver, 1 bronze
- Junior World Championship medals: 1 silver
- Henley Royal Regatta: 19 wins

=== Olympic Games ===
- 2000 – Gold, Coxless Four (with Matthew Pinsent, Tim Foster, James Cracknell)
- 1996 – Gold, Coxless Pair (with Matthew Pinsent)
- 1992 – Gold, Coxless Pair (with Matthew Pinsent)
- 1988 – Gold, Coxless Pair (with Andy Holmes)
- 1988 – Bronze, Coxed Pair (with Andy Holmes and Patrick Sweeney)
- 1984 – Gold, Coxed Four (with Martin Cross, Adrian Ellison, Andy Holmes and Richard Budgett).

=== World Rowing Championships ===
- 1999 – Gold, Coxless Four (with James Cracknell, Ed Coode, Matthew Pinsent)
- 1998 – Gold, Coxless Four (with James Cracknell, Tim Foster, Matthew Pinsent)
- 1997 – Gold, Coxless Four (with James Cracknell, Tim Foster, Matthew Pinsent)
- 1995 – Gold, Coxless Pair (with Matthew Pinsent)
- 1994 – Gold, Coxless Pair (with Matthew Pinsent)
- 1993 – Gold, Coxless Pair (with Matthew Pinsent)
- 1991 – Gold, Coxless Pair (with Matthew Pinsent)
- 1990 – Bronze, Coxless Pair (with Matthew Pinsent)
- 1989 – Silver, Coxless Pairs (with Simon Berrisford)
- 1989 – 5th, Coxed Pairs (with Simon Berrisford and Patrick Sweeney)
- 1987 – Gold, Coxless Pairs (with Andy Holmes)
- 1987 – Silver, Coxed Pairs (with Andy Holmes and Patrick Sweeney)
- 1986 – Gold, Coxed Pairs (with Andy Holmes and Patrick Sweeney)
- 1985 – 12th, Single Sculls
- 1983 – Single Sculls
- 1982 – 6th, Quadruple Scull
- 1981 – 8th, Quadruple Scull

=== Junior World Rowing Championships ===
- 1980 – Silver, Double Sculls
- 1979 – Single Sculls

=== Henley Royal Regatta ===
- 2001 – Queen Mother Challenge Cup
- 2000 – Stewards' Challenge Cup
- 1999 – Stewards' Challenge Cup
- 1998 – Stewards' Challenge Cup
- 1997 – Stewards' Challenge Cup
- 1995 – Prince Philip Challenge Cup
- 1995 – Silver Goblets & Nickalls' Challenge Cup
- 1994 – Silver Goblets & Nickalls' Challenge Cup
- 1993 – Stewards' Challenge Cup
- 1993 – Silver Goblets & Nickalls' Challenge Cup
- 1991 – Silver Goblets & Nickalls' Challenge Cup
- 1989 – Silver Goblets & Nickalls' Challenge Cup
- 1987 – Silver Goblets & Nickalls' Challenge Cup
- 1986 – Silver Goblets & Nickalls' Challenge Cup
- 1985 – Diamond Challenge Sculls
- 1984 – Prince Philip Challenge Cup
- 1983 – Diamond Challenge Sculls
- 1982 – Double Sculls Challenge Cup
- 1981 – Double Sculls Challenge Cup

=== Other ===
- 1996 – Winner of Celebrity Gladiators
- 2000 – BBC Sports Personality of the Year
- 2001 – Collected a knighthood from Queen Elizabeth II
- 2001 – Received an Honorary Doctorate from Heriot-Watt University
- 2001 - had the new sports room named after him, at The World Famous Phoenix Club
- 2010 – Awarded the degree of Hon. LLD from the University of St Andrews
- 2011 – BBC Sports – Lifetime Achievement Award
- 2012 – Carried the London 2012 Olympic Torch into the Olympic Stadium
- 2013 – Awarded an honorary doctorate by the University of Edinburgh "in recognition of his outstanding sporting achievements and role as a sports ambassador".

== Bibliography ==
- Steve Redgrave: A Golden age (2000) with Nick Townsend (ghostwriter). ISBN 0-563-55182-8
  - 2nd edition: 2001 ISBN 0-563-53821-X
- Steve Redgrave's Complete Book of Rowing (1992). ISBN 1-85225-124-7
  - 2nd edition: 1995 ISBN 1-85225-230-8
- You Can Win At Life! (2005) with Nick Townsend. ISBN 0-563-48776-3.
- Inspired (2009). ISBN 978-0755319640
- Foreword to Diabetes: The at Your Fingertips Guide 5th edition (2003) ISBN 1-85959-087-X

== See also ==
- Jack Beresford, rower, Britain's most successful Olympian prior to Redgrave's fourth gold medal, with three gold and two silver medals from 1920 to 1936
- List of multiple Olympic gold medalists
- List of multiple Olympic gold medalists in one event
- List of people diagnosed with ulcerative colitis
