= Michael Plumb (rower) =

American rower (born 1954)

Personal information
- Nationality: American
- Born: Michael Anthony Plumb; 19 July 1954 (age 72) Syracuse, New York, United States
- Height: 196 cm (6 ft 5 in)
- Weight: 95 kg (209 lb)

Sport
- Club: Vesper Boat Club

Michael Anthony Plumb (born 19 July 1954) is a retired rower from the United States.

Plumb was born in 1954 in Syracuse, New York, United States. He attended Syracuse University and was a member of the Syracuse Orange men's crew in 1974–75.

Plumb represented the United States at the 1976 Summer Olympics in the coxed four event. He is a member of Vesper Boat Club in Philadelphia, Pennsylvania.
