= Barrie Mabbott =

New Zealand rower (born 1960)

Personal information
- Born: James Barrie Mabbott; 19 November 1960 (age 65) Carterton, New Zealand
- Height: 195 cm (6 ft 5 in)
- Weight: 90 kg (198 lb)

Sport
- Sport: Rowing
- Club: North Shore Rowing Club
Medal record
Men's rowing
Representing New Zealand
Olympic Games
Bronze medal – third place	1984 Los Angeles	Coxed four
Commonwealth Games
Silver medal – second place	1986 Edinburgh	Coxless pair
Bronze medal – third place	1986 Edinburgh	Eight
World Championships
Gold medal – first place	1983 Wedau	Eight

James Barrie Mabbott (born 19 November 1960) is a former New Zealand rower who won an Olympic bronze medal at the 1984 Summer Olympics in Los Angeles.

== Biography ==
Mabbott was born in 1960 in Carterton. He began rowing at Westlake Boys High School in the Auckland suburb of Forrest Hill, the same school as fellow Olympic Bronze medallist Eric Verdonk. Mabbott was selected in the coxed four at the 1980 Summer Olympics in Moscow but did not compete due to the Olympics boycott. At the 1983 World Rowing Championships at Wedau in Duisburg, Germany, he won a gold medal with the New Zealand eight in seat six. At the 1984 Olympics, Mabbott won the bronze medal in the coxed four along with Don Symon, Kevin Lawton, Ross Tong and Brett Hollister (cox). Mabbott competed at the 1986 Commonwealth Games in Edinburgh winning a silver medal with Ian Wright in the coxless pair and a bronze medal in the eights. He is listed as New Zealand Olympian athlete number 463 by the New Zealand Olympic Committee. Mabbott is Rowing New Zealand's high performance commissioner.

Mabbott is married to Gillian. He used to be a part-owner of a crane and construction hire business.
