= Don Symon =

New Zealand rower (born 1960)

Personal information
- Born: Donald Alan Symon; 20 May 1960 (age 66) Christchurch, New Zealand
- Height: 205 cm (6 ft 9 in)
- Weight: 98 kg (216 lb)

Sport
- Sport: Rowing
- Club: Avon Rowing Club
Medal record
Men's rowing
Representing New Zealand
Olympic Games
Bronze medal – third place	1984 Los Angeles	Coxed four
Commonwealth Games
Silver medal – second place	1986 Edinburgh	Coxless four
Bronze medal – third place	1986 Edinburgh	Eight

Donald Alan Symon (born 20 May 1960) is a former New Zealand rower who won an Olympic bronze medal at the 1984 Summer Olympics in Los Angeles.

Symon was born in 1960 in Christchurch, New Zealand. Along with Kevin Lawton, Barrie Mabbott, Ross Tong and Brett Hollister (cox) Symon won the bronze medal in the coxed four. Symon also won a silver medal in the coxless four and a bronze medal in the eight at the 1986 Commonwealth Games in Edinburgh. He is listed as New Zealand Olympian athlete number 508 by the New Zealand Olympic Committee.
