= Edward Ives (rower) =

American rower (born 1961)

Personal information
- Born: January 3, 1961 (age 65) Mount Kisco, New York, USA
Medal record
Men's rowing
Representing the United States
Olympic Games
Silver medal – second place	1984 Los Angeles	Coxed four
World Championships
Bronze medal – third place	1986 Nottingham	Eights
Pan American Games
Gold medal – first place	1987 Indianapolis	Eights
Goodwill Games
Gold medal – first place	1986 Moscow	Eights

Edward Ashley Ives (born January 3, 1961) is a former American competitive rower and Olympic silver medalist. He represented the United States at the 1984 Summer Olympics in Los Angeles, where he received a silver medal in the men's coxed fours competition with Thomas Kiefer, Michael Bach, Gregory Springer, and John Stillings. Four years later, at the 1988 Summer Olympics, he finished in 9th place in the men's coxless pairs.
