= Michael Bach (rower) =

American rower (born 1960)

Personal information
- Full name: Michael Richardson Bach
- Born: July 25, 1960 (age 66) Staten Island, New York, U.S.
Medal record
Men's rowing
Representing the United States
Olympic Games
Silver medal – second place	1984 Los Angeles	Coxed four

Michael Richardson Bach (born July 25, 1960, in Staten Island, New York) is an American former competitive rower and Olympic silver medalist.

== Career ==
A three-year letterman at Cornell University, he rowed in the No.3 seat of the heavyweight varsity eight-oared crew which won the Intercollegiate Rowing Association (IRA) championship in both 1981 and 1982. The Cornell varsity eight competed for the Grand Challenge Cup at the Henley Royal Regatta in 1981, while the 1982 varsity went on to place second at the Cincinnati Regatta in 1982. As a sophomore in 1980, he also rowed in the No.3 seat in the junior varsity eight which won the IRA championship. As a member of the U.S. rowing team, he rowed in the four-man with coxswain crew which won a silver medal at the 1984 Olympic Games in Los Angeles. He was a graduate of William H. Hall High School in West Hartford, Conn.

At the 1984 Summer Olympics, Bach finished in 2nd place in the men's coxed fours competition with Edwards Ives, Thomas Kiefer, Gregory Springer, and John Stillings.
