= Heribert Karches =

German rower

Personal information
- Nationality: German
- Born: 12 November 1958 (age 67) Mainz, Germany

Sport
- Sport: Rowing

Heribert Karches (born 12 November 1958) is a German rower. He competed in the men's coxed four event at the 1984 Summer Olympics.
