= Hartmut Wenzel =

German coxswain (1947–2020)

Personal information
- Born: 23 February 1947 Berlin
- Died: 24 August 2020 (aged 73) Essen
- Height: 167 cm (5 ft 6 in)
- Weight: 54 kg (119 lb)

Sport
- Sport: Rowing
- Club: TSC Berlin; RK Am Baldeneysee Essen
Medal record
Men's rowing
Representing East Germany
World Rowing Championships
Bronze medal – third place	1966 Bled	Eight
European Rowing Championships
Silver medal – second place	1969 Klagenfurt	Coxed four
Representing West Germany
Olympic Games
Bronze medal – third place	1976 Montreal	Coxed four
World Rowing Championships
Bronze medal – third place	1975 Nottingham	Coxed four
Bronze medal – third place	1977 Amsterdam	Eight
Silver medal – second place	1978 Cambridge	Eight

Hartmut Wenzel (23 February 1947 – 24 August 2020) was a German coxswain. He defected from East Germany during his rowing career in 1971, later winning Olympic bronze for West Germany.

Wenzel was born in 1947 in Berlin. He was a rowing cox for TSC Berlin and in 1966, he won his first national title coxing the eight. He then went to the 1966 World Rowing Championships in Bled with the eight where they won a bronze medal. For their success at the World Championships, team members were awarded the title and medal Honoured Master of Sports.

After a break from the sport, he came second at the East German national championships in 1969 with the eight from TSC Berlin, beaten for first place by ASK Vorwärts Rostock. From this team, a coxed four was formed for the 1969 European Rowing Championships in Klagenfurt, and they won the silver medal behind West Germany. The same team came second at the 1970 East German national championships, beaten by rowers from ASK Vorwärts Rostock.

In 1971, Wenzel defected and joined RK Am Baldeneysee Essen. In 1971, his first season at the new club, he became national champion with the coxed four. For the 1972 rowing season, he changed to the eight and the team won silver at the national championships. In 1973, the rowing eight from Essen became German champion. In 1974, he was back coxing the four for Essen, and they became German champion. For the 1975 World Rowing Championships in Nottingham, he was the cox for four rowers from different clubs, and this team won a bronze medal after the Soviet Union and East Germany. Most of Wenzel's team members changed for the 1976 season, but the new composition once again won the national championships. He also coxed an eight at the national championships, and that boat came second. West Germany qualified a coxed four for the 1976 Summer Olympics in Montreal and further changes to the rowing team composition were made. That team won the bronze medal in the coxed four event.

At the 1977 World Rowing Championships in Amsterdam, Wenzel coxed the eight that won the bronze medal. In 1978, he coxed an eight that came second at the national championships. The exact same team won the silver medal, behind East Germany, at the 1978 World Rowing Championships in Cambridge, New Zealand. He finished his international career with his appearance in New Zealand.

At the national championships in 1979, Wenzel came second with the coxed four, and third with the eight. The same eight went to the 1979 World Rowing Championships in Bled where they came ninth.

He had been ill for several years before he died on 24 August 2020.
