= John Stillings =

American rower

Personal information
- Born: July 23, 1955 (age 70) Sedro-Woolley, Washington, U.S.
Medal record
Men's rowing
Representing the United States
Olympic Games
Silver medal – second place	1984 Los Angeles	Coxed four

John Stuart Stillings (born July 23, 1955) is an American former competitive rower and Olympic silver medalist.

== Career ==
Stillings was the coxswain of the U.S. men’s four with coxswain that won the silver medal in the men's coxed fours competition at the 1984 Summer Olympics in Los Angeles with Edward Ives, Thomas Kiefer, Michael Bach, and Gregory Springer.

One of the most successful coxswains in University of Washington history, Stillings guided the Huskies to two collegiate National Championships and its first and only Henley Royal Regatta Grand Challenge Cup victory in 1977, where the collegiate team defeated a heavily favored British National team.

Along the way to the Olympic Games, the Edmonds, Washington native and Husky Hall of Famer, won five U.S. club national championships and gold as the coxswain of the U.S. men’s eight-oared crew at the 1983 Pan American Games.

In a sport dominated by young athletes, Stillings accomplished a successful come-back to international rowing at the age of 48, winning the gold as coxswain of the U.S. men’s eight-oared crew at the 2003 Pan American Games in the Dominican Republic.

A leader in the worldwide Olympic movement, Stillings serves as president of the Washington State Chapter of the U.S. Olympians Association and is actively involved in connecting local Olympians with non-profit organizations throughout the state. Stillings is an accomplished painter with works on display with the Art of the Olympians.

Stillings still competes in international masters rowing competitions. He is married to Olympic gold medalist and fellow University of Washington alumnus Betsy Beard-Stillings. The two make their home in Seattle and have two children.
