= Ross Tong =

New Zealand rower

Personal information
- Born: Ross Stuart Tong; 21 April 1961 (age 65) Wanganui, New Zealand
- Height: 1.84 m (6 ft 0 in)
- Weight: 89 kg (196 lb)
- Relative: Allan Tong (father)

Sport
- Sport: Rowing
- Club: Waikato Rowing Club
Medal record
Men's rowing
Representing New Zealand
Olympic Games
Bronze medal – third place	1984 Los Angeles	Coxed four

Ross Stuart Tong (born 21 April 1961) is a former New Zealand rower who won an Olympic bronze medal at the 1984 Summer Olympics in Los Angeles.

Tong was born in 1961 in Wanganui, New Zealand. His father, Allan Tong, was an Olympic rower in 1956. Along with Don Symon, Kevin Lawton, Barrie Mabbott and Brett Hollister (cox), Tong Jr. won the bronze medal in the coxed four in 1984. He is listed as New Zealand Olympian athlete number 515 by the New Zealand Olympic Committee.

Tong is a former police officer. For some time, he coached rowing at King's College in Auckland. Tong is now Director of Sport at St John's College, Hamilton.
