= André Berezin =

Brazilian rower

Personal information
- Born: 28 April 1960 (age 64); São Paulo, Brazil

Sport
- Sport: Rowing

André Berezin (born 28 April 1960) is a Brazilian rower. He competed in the men's coxed four event at the 1984 Summer Olympics.
