= Giovanni Sergi Sergas =

Italian rower

Personal information
- Nationality: Italian
- Born: 26 April 1959 (age 65); Trieste, Italy

Sport
- Sport: Rowing

Giovanni Sergi Sergas (born 26 April 1959) is an Italian rower. He competed in the men's coxed four event at the 1984 Summer Olympics.
