= Włodzimierz Chmielewski =

Polish rower

Personal information
- Nationality: Polish
- Born: 7 August 1945 (age 79); Przasnysz, Poland

Sport
- Sport: Rowing

Włodzimierz Chmielewski (born 7 August 1945) is a Polish rower. He competed in the men's coxed four event at the 1976 Summer Olympics.
