= Lionel Girard =

French rower

Personal information
- Nationality: French
- Born: 29 August 1953 (age 71)

Sport
- Sport: Rowing

Lionel Girard (born 29 August 1953) is a French rower. He competed in the men's coxed four event at the 1976 Summer Olympics.
