= Nacho Minchev =

Bulgarian rower

Personal information
- Nationality: Bulgarian
- Born: 19 December 1956 (age 68)

Sport
- Sport: Rowing

Nacho Minchev (Bulgarian: Начо Минчев, born 19 December 1956) is a Bulgarian rower. He competed in the men's coxed four event at the 1976 Summer Olympics.
