= Tracy Berno =

Psychologist and professor at Auckland University of Technology in New Zealand

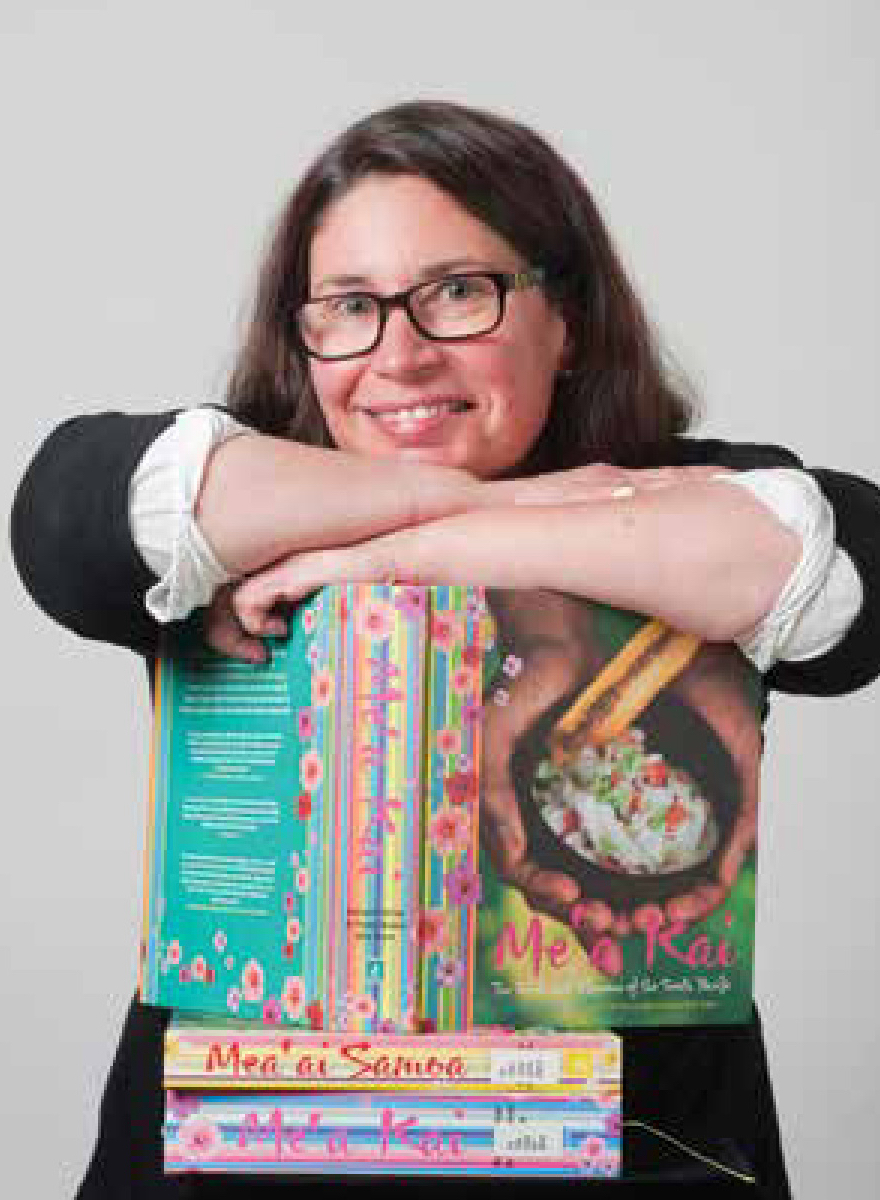
- Berno in 2015

Academic background
- Education: University of Canterbury
- Thesis: The socio-cultural and psychological effects of tourism on indigenous cultures (1995)
- Doctoral advisor: David Simmons, Ken Strongman, Colleen Ward

Academic work
- Discipline: gastronomy
- Institutions: Lincoln University; Auckland University of Technology
- Main interests: sustainable food systems, gastronomy and tourism

Tracy Berno is a New Zealand academic, specialising in cross-cultural psychology and food. As of 2022 she is a full professor of the culinary arts in the School of Hospitality and Tourism at Auckland University of Technology.

== Academic career ==
Berno has a AB with honours in psychology from Vassar College, and an MA in psychology from the University of Canterbury. She completed a PhD in psychology in 1995 and also has a postgraduate tertiary teaching certificate from the University of the South Pacific. Berno worked as Planning Director and a lecturer in tourism at Lincoln University, and in 1996 was awarded an Excellence in Teaching award. The citation noted Berno's skill in making the learning process of quantitative social science research methods enjoyable. Berno moved to Auckland University of Technology, rising to full professor in January 2022. She is also an adjunct professor at the University of the South Pacific. Her research centres on sustainable food systems, and a "food-lab approach" to socially and economically sustainable development. Berno founded Pacific Food Lab-Aotearoa (PFL-A), which is a partner organisation to Pacific Food Lab-New Caledonia.

Berno has co-authored three award-winning books on "agriculture, culture, cuisine and tourism development in the South Pacific and Asia". Meʻa Kai: The Food and Flavours of the South Pacific, which Berno co-authored with Robert Oliver and Shiri Ram, was awarded the Best New Zealand Cookbook and the Cookbook of the Year award in the Gourmand World Cookbook Awards in 2010. Berno contributed to Hiakai: Modern Māori Cuisine with chef Monique Fiso, with research on the origins of Māori cuisine. Hiakai won the best illustrated non-fiction award at the 2021 Ockham New Zealand Book Awards. Meaʻai Samoa: Recipes and Stories from the Heart of Polynesia was another collaboration with chef Robert Oliver and photographer Shiri Ram, it won the "Best authors and chefs award" in the Gourmand World Cookbook Awards of 2014.

== Selected works ==
=== Cookbooks ===
- Monique Fiso; Lucy Corry; Berno, Tracy (2020). Hiakai: modern Māori cuisine. Auckland: Godwit Press. ISBN 978-0-14-377260-6. OCLC 1182024455. Wikidata Q115488367.
- Robert Oliver; Berno, Tracy (2013). Meʻai Samoa: recipes and stories from the heart of Samoa. Auckland: Godwit Press. ISBN 978-1-77553-427-3. OCLC 858410775. Wikidata Q115488369.
- Robert Oliver; Berno, Tracy; Shiri Ram (2010). Me'a kai: the food and flavours of the South Pacific. Auckland: Godwit Press. ISBN 978-1-86962-175-9. OCLC 612371957. OL 28452199M. Wikidata Q115488368.

=== Academic publications ===
- Berno, Tracy; Ward, Colleen Ann (2005). "Innocence abroad: a pocket guide to psychological research on tourism". American Psychologist. 60 (6): 593–600. doi:10.1037/0003-066x.60.6.593. PMID 16173892. Wikidata Q36262158.
- Berno, Tracy; Ward, Colleen Ann (2003), Cross-cultural and educational adaptation of Asian students in New Zealand (PDF), Wellington: Asia 2000 Foundation of New Zealand, OCLC 1135041944, Wikidata Q115488366
- Ward, Colleen Ann; Berno, Tracy (2011). "Beyond social exchange theory". Annals of Tourism Research. 38 (4): 1556–1569. doi:10.1016/j.annals.2011.02.005. Wikidata Q115489239.
- Berno, Tracy; Francesc Fusté-Forné (2019). "Imaginaries of cheese: revisiting narratives of local produce in the contemporary world". Annals of leisure research. 23 (5): 608–626. doi:10.1080/11745398.2019.1603113. Wikidata Q115489284.
- Berno, Tracy; Gobie Rajalingam; Agueda Isolina Miranda; Julia Ximenes (2021). "Promoting sustainable tourism futures in Timor-Leste by creating synergies between food, place and people". Journal of Sustainable Tourism. 30 (2–3): 500–514. doi:10.1080/09669582.2021.1895819. Wikidata Q115489283.
- Berno, Tracy (1999). "When a guest is a guest". Annals of Tourism Research. 26 (3): 656–675. doi:10.1016/s0160-7383(99)00002-x. Wikidata Q115489282.
