= Siegfried Fricke =

German rower (born 1954)

Olympic medal record

Men's rowing
Bronze medal – third place	1976 Montreal	Coxed four

Siegfried Fricke (born 19 November 1954) is a German rower who competed for West Germany in the 1976 Summer Olympics and later became a politician.

He was born in Bralorne, British Columbia, Canada.

In 1976 he was a crew member of the West German boat which won the bronze medal in the coxed fours event.
