= Paul Tessier (rowing) =

Canadian coxswain

Personal information
- Born: 26 August 1961 (age 63); Regina, Saskatchewan, Canada

Sport
- Sport: Rowing

Paul Tessier (born 26 August 1961) is a Canadian rowing coxswain. He competed in the men's coxed four event at the 1984 Summer Olympics.
