= Ian Boserio =

New Zealand rower

Personal information
- Nationality: New Zealand
- Born: Ian Martyn Boserio; 15 March 1952 (age 74) Lower Hutt, New Zealand
- Education: Victoria University of Wellington
- Height: 185 cm (6 ft 1 in)
- Weight: 85 kg (187 lb)

Sport
- Club: Petone Rowing Club

Ian Martyn Boserio (born 15 March 1952) is a New Zealand rower.

He was born in 1952 in Lower Hutt, New Zealand. He was a member of the Petone Rowing Club. He represented New Zealand at the 1976 Summer Olympics, and is listed as Olympian athlete 336 by the New Zealand Olympic Committee.

Boserio earned a BSc degree in Geology from Victoria University of Wellington in 1974, and an honours degree in geophysics in 1980. He works in the oil and gas exploration industry.
