= Rüdiger Kunze =

German rower (born 1949)

Medal record

Men's rowing

Representing East Germany

Olympic Games
Silver medal – second place	1976 Montreal	Coxed four

World Rowing Championships
Gold medal – first place	1974 Lucerne	Coxed four
Silver medal – second place	1975 Nottingham	Coxed four

Rüdiger Kunze (born 2 September 1949) is a German rower who competed for East Germany in the 1976 Summer Olympics.

He was born in Bautzen. In 1976 he was a crew member of the East German boat which won the silver medal in the coxed fours event.
