= Viv Haar =

New Zealand rower (born 1952)

Personal information
- Birth name: Vivian Tainui Haar
- Born: 27 August 1952 (age 72); Taumarunui, New Zealand

Sport
- Sport: Rowing

Vivian Tainui "Viv" Haar (born 27 August 1952) is a rower from New Zealand.

Haar was born in 1952 in Taumarunui, New Zealand. He was a member of the Petone Rowing Club.

He represented New Zealand in the coxed fours at the 1976 Summer Olympics at Montreal, and they came in sixth place. He is listed as New Zealand Olympian athlete number 349 by the New Zealand Olympic Committee.

== See also ==
- Rowing at the 1976 Summer Olympics
