= Jim Muldoon =

Irish rower

Personal information
- Nationality: Irish
- Born: 4 October 1946 (age 78)

Sport
- Sport: Rowing

Jim Muldoon (born 4 October 1946) is an Irish rower. He competed in the men's coxed four event at the 1976 Summer Olympics.
