= Tim Logan =

New Zealand rower

Personal information
- Nationality: New Zealand
- Born: Timothy Logan; 16 August 1953 (age 72) Wellington, New Zealand
- Height: 197 cm (6 ft 6 in)
- Weight: 95 kg (209 lb)

Sport
- Club: Petone Rowing Club
Medal record
World Rowing Championships
Silver medal – second place	1979 Bled	Eight

Timothy Logan (born 16 August 1953) is a New Zealand rower.

Logan was born in 1953 in Wellington, New Zealand. He was a member of Petone Rowing Club. He represented New Zealand at the 1976 Summer Olympics. He is listed as New Zealand Olympian athlete number 357 by the New Zealand Olympic Committee.
