= Danny Keane =

New Zealand rower (born 1951)

Personal information
- Nationality: New Zealand
- Born: Daniel William Keane; 21 March 1951 (age 75) Hamilton, New Zealand
- Height: 189 cm (6 ft 2 in)
- Weight: 86 kg (190 lb)
Medal record
Men's rowing
Representing New Zealand
World Rowing Championships
Bronze medal – third place	1974 Lucerne	Eight

Daniel William Keane (born 21 March 1951) is a New Zealand rower.

Keane was born in 1951 in Hamilton, New Zealand. He represented New Zealand at the 1976 Summer Olympics. He is listed as New Zealand Olympian athlete number 354 by the New Zealand Olympic Committee. Keane now lives in Whitianga on the Coromandel Peninsula.
