= Bernard Bruand =

French rower

Personal information
- Nationality: French
- Born: June 16, 1951 Cognac, France
- Died: March 11, 2025 (aged 73) Cognac, France

Sport
- Sport: Rowing

Bernard Bruand (16 June 1951 – 11 March 2025) was a French rower. He competed at the 1972 Summer Olympics, 1976 Summer Olympics and the 1980 Summer Olympics.
