= Lachezar Boychev =

Bulgarian rower

Personal information
- Nationality: Bulgarian
- Born: 8 June 1957 (age 67)

Sport
- Sport: Rowing

Lachezar Boychev (Bulgarian: Лъчезар Бойчев; born 8 June 1957) is a Bulgarian rower. He competed at the 1976 Summer Olympics and the 1980 Summer Olympics.
