= Ralph Kubail =

German rower (1952–1981)

Personal information
- Born: 30 April 1952 Berlin
- Died: 15 August 1981 (aged 29)

Sport
- Sport: Rowing
- Club: Potsdamer RC Germania
Medal record
Men's rowing
Representing West Germany
Olympic Games
Bronze medal – third place	1976 Montreal	Coxed four
World Rowing Championships
Bronze medal – third place	1974 Lucerne	Coxed four
Bronze medal – third place	1975 Nottingham	Coxed four

Ralph Kubail (30 April 1952 – 15 August 1981) was a German rower who competed for West Germany in the 1976 Summer Olympics.

At the 1974 World Rowing Championships in Lucerne, he won bronze with the coxed four. At the 1975 World Rowing Championships in Nottingham, he won bronze with the coxed four. In 1976 he was a crew member of the West German boat that won the bronze medal in the coxed four event. He died of lymphoma on 15 August 1981.
