= Sverre Norberg =

Norwegian rower

Personal information
- Nationality: Norwegian
- Born: 5 September 1953 (age 71); Horten, Norway

Sport
- Country: Norway
- Sport: Rowing

Sverre Norberg (born 5 September 1953 in Horten, Norway) is a Norwegian sport rower. He was born in Horten. He competed at the 1976 Summer Olympics in Montreal.
