= Nick Toulmin =

Canadian rower

Personal information
- Born: 26 September 1958 (age 66); Montreal, Quebec, Canada

Sport
- Sport: Rowing

Nicholas Toulmin (born 26 September 1958) is a Canadian rower. He competed in the men's coxed four event at the 1984 Summer Olympics.
