= Mikhail Kuznetsov (rower) =

Russian rower

Personal information
- Born: Mikhail Nikolaevich Kuznetsov; 4 June 1952 (age 74) Moscow, Russian SFSR, Soviet Union
- Height: 170 cm (5 ft 7 in)
- Weight: 75 kg (165 lb)

Sport
- Sport: Rowing
- Club: TsSK VMF Moskva
Medal record
Men's rowing
Representing Soviet Union
Olympic Games
Gold medal – first place	1976 Montreal	Coxed four
World Rowing Championships
Silver medal – second place	1977 Amsterdam	Eight

Mikhail Nikolaevich Kuznetsov (Russian: Михаил Николаевич Кузнецов, born 4 June 1952) is a Russian rower who competed for the Soviet Union in the 1976 Summer Olympics.

He was born in Moscow. In 1976 he was a crew member of the Soviet boat which won the gold medal in the coxed four event.
