= Ivan Botev =

Bulgarian rower (born 1955)

Personal information
- Nationality: Bulgarian
- Born: 30 May 1955 (age 71)
- Height: 192 cm (6 ft 4 in)
- Weight: 88 kg (194 lb)

Sport
- Sport: Rowing
Medal record
Men's rowing
Representing Bulgaria
World Rowing Championships
| Bronze medal – third place | 1977 Amsterdam | Coxed four |
| Bronze medal – third place | 1978 Karapiro | Coxed four |

Ivan Botev (Bulgarian: Иван Ботев; born 30 May 1955) is a Bulgarian rower. He competed at the 1976 Summer Olympics and the 1980 Summer Olympics.
