= Robert Zagunis =

American rower

Personal information
- Nationality: American
- Born: October 1, 1953 (age 71); Mexico City, Mexico

Sport
- Sport: Rowing

Robert Zagunis (born October 1, 1953) is an American rower. He competed in the men's coxed four event at the 1976 Summer Olympics. Zagunis is of Lithuanian descent.
