= Johannes Thomas =

East German rowing cox

Olympic medal record

Representing East Germany

Men's rowing
Silver medal – second place	1976 Montreal	Coxed four

Johannes Thomas (born 11 September 1949) is a German rower who competed for East Germany at the 1976 Summer Olympics.

Born in Dresden, he was the coxswain of the East German boat that won the silver medal in the coxed four event in 1976.
