= Ryszard Burak =

Polish rower

Personal information
- Nationality: Polish
- Born: 3 February 1954 (age 71); Szczecin, Poland

Sport
- Sport: Rowing

Ryszard Burak (born 3 February 1954) is a Polish rower. He competed at the 1976 Summer Olympics and the 1980 Summer Olympics.
