= Liam Redmond (rowing) =

Irish rower

Personal information
- Nationality: Irish
- Born: 5 February 1953 (age 72)

Sport
- Sport: Rowing

Liam Redmond (born 5 February 1953) is an Irish rower. He competed in the men's coxed four event at the 1976 Summer Olympics.
