= Ariosto Temporin =

Italian rower

Personal information
- Nationality: Italian
- Born: 17 April 1955 (age 69)

Sport
- Sport: Rowing

Ariosto Temporin (born 17 April 1955) is an Italian rower. He competed in the men's coxed four event at the 1976 Summer Olympics.
