= Andreas Schulz (rower) =

German rower (born 1951)

Personal information
- Born: 5 October 1951 (age 74) Freital, East Germany
Medal record
Men's rowing
Representing East Germany
Olympic Games
| Silver medal – second place | 1976 Montreal | Coxed four |
World Rowing Championships
| Gold medal – first place | 1974 Lucerne | Coxed four |
| Silver medal – second place | 1975 Nottingham | Coxed four |

Andreas Schulz (born 5 October 1951) is a German rower who competed for East Germany in the 1976 Summer Olympics.

He was born in Freital. In 1976 he was a crew member of the East German boat which won the silver medal in the coxed fours event.
