= Kiril Kirchev =

Bulgarian rower

Personal information
- Nationality: Bulgarian
- Born: 29 March 1955 (age 69)

Sport
- Sport: Rowing

Kiril Kirchev (Bulgarian: Кирил Кирчев, born 29 March 1955) is a Bulgarian rower. He competed at the 1976 Summer Olympics and the 1980 Summer Olympics.
