= Mick Ryan (rower) =

Irish rower

Personal information
- Nationality: Irish
- Born: 19 October 1947 (age 77)

Sport
- Sport: Rowing

Mick Ryan (born 19 October 1947) is an Irish rower. He competed in the men's coxed four event at the 1976 Summer Olympics.
