= Gregory Springer =

American rower (born 1961)

Personal information
- Born: February 13, 1961 (age 65) Woodland Hills, California, U.S.
Medal record
Men's rowing
Representing the United States
Olympic Games
Silver medal – second place	1984 Los Angeles	Coxed four

Gregory Thomas Springer (born February 13, 1961) is an American former competitive rower and Olympic silver medalist.

== Career ==
At the 1984 Summer Olympics (preceded by 4 years at the University of California, Irvine), Springer finished in 2nd place in the men's coxed fours competition with Edward Ives, Thomas Kiefer, Michael Bach, and John Stillings. At the 1992 Summer Olympics, he finished in 9th place in the men's double sculls.
