= Rune Dahl =

Norwegian rower

Personal information
- Nationality: Norwegian
- Born: 28 February 1955 (age 70); Stavanger

Sport
- Country: Norway
- Sport: Rowing

Rune Dahl (born 28 February 1955 in Stavanger, Norway) is a retired Norwegian sport rower. He was born in Stavanger. He competed at the 1976 Summer Olympics in Montreal.
