= David Simmons (tourism academic) =

New Zealand rowing cox

David Simmons CNZM
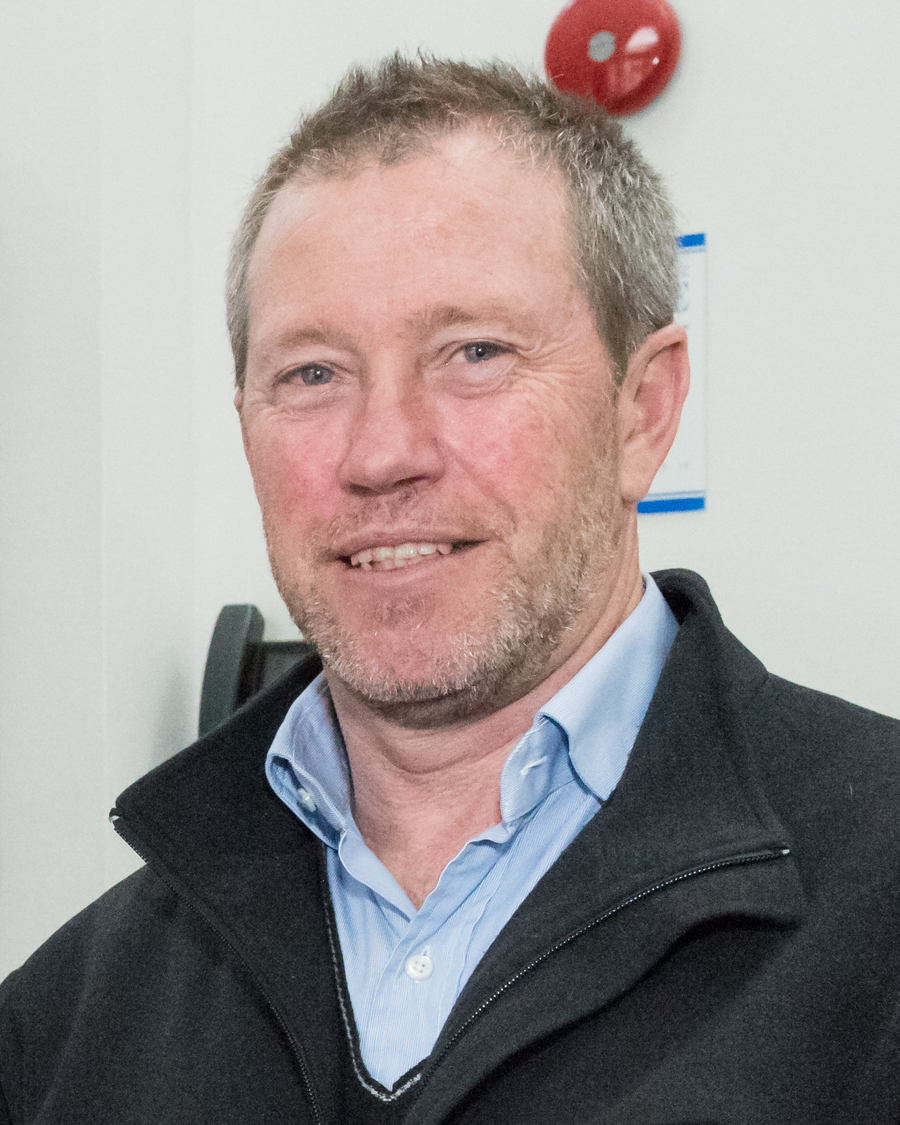
- Simmons in 2015

Personal information
- Born: David Gerard Simmons; 6 October 1955 (age 70) Christchurch, New Zealand
- Height: 168 cm (5 ft 6 in)
- Weight: 50 kg (110 lb)

Sport
- Country: New Zealand
- Sport: Rowing
Medal record
Men's rowing
Representing New Zealand
World Rowing Championships
Bronze medal – third place	1974 Lucerne	Eight
Bronze medal – third place	1975 Nottingham	Eight

David Gerard Simmons CNZM (born 6 October 1955) is a New Zealand lecturer in tourism policy. During his university years, he was a rowing cox, winning bronze medals at two world rowing championships.

== Biography ==
Simmons was born in 1955 in Christchurch. He was the cox for the eight in the 1975 World Rowing Championships in Nottingham, Great Britain, and won a bronze medal. He represented New Zealand at the 1976 Summer Olympics. He is listed as New Zealand Olympian athlete number 375 by the New Zealand Olympic Committee.

Simmons gained a Bachelor of Science and then a Master of Applied Science from the University of Canterbury. He wrote his PhD at the University of Waterloo in Canada. Since 1980, he has lectured in tourism policy at Lincoln University, where he is now an emeritus professor. Notable students of Simmons include Tracy Berno.

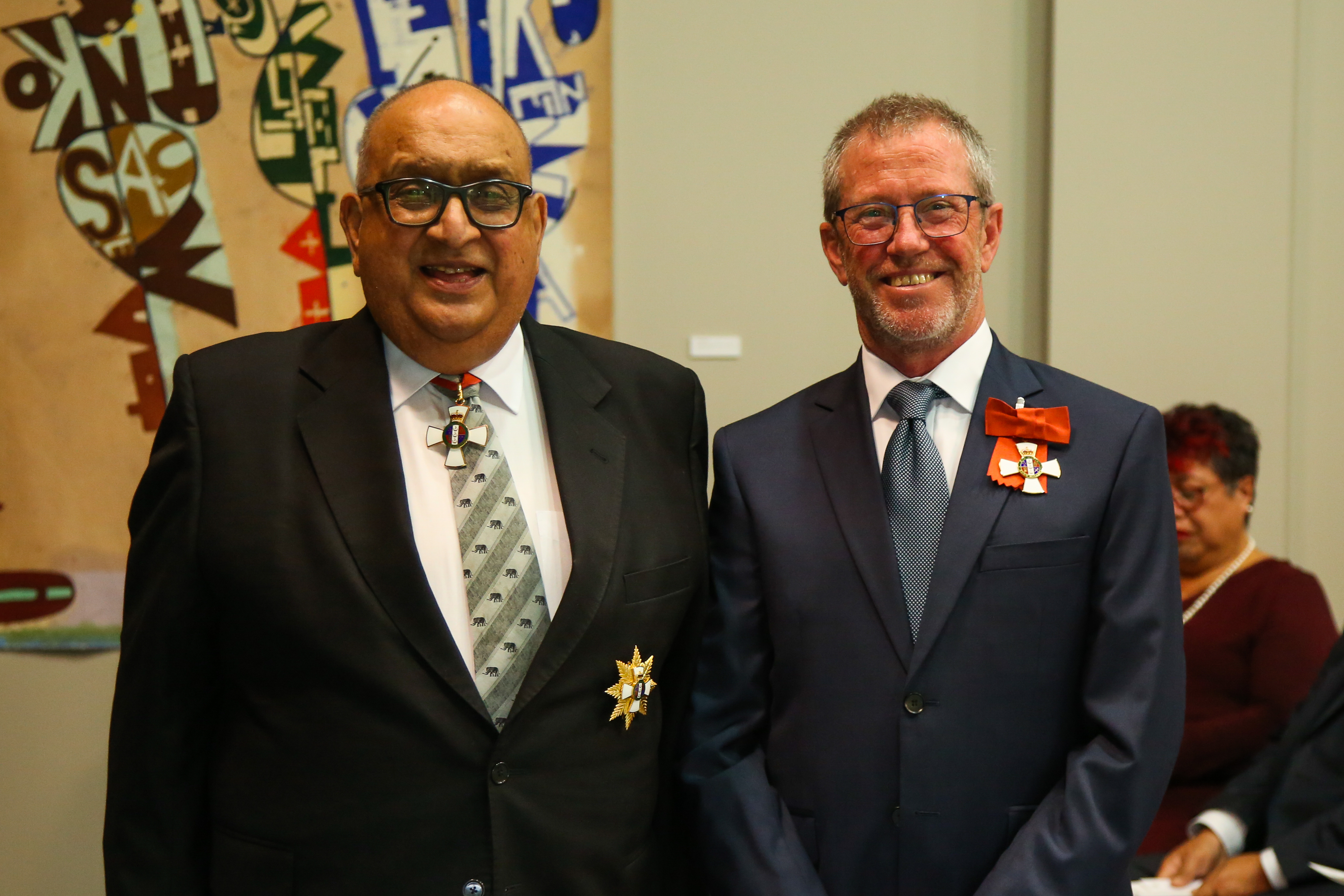
Simmons (right), after his investiture as a Companion of the New Zealand Order of Merit by the former governor-general, Sir Anand Satyanand, at Government House, Auckland, on 11 April 2023

In the 2023 New Year Honours, Simmons was appointed a Companion of the New Zealand Order of Merit (CNZM), for services to tourism and tertiary education.
