= James Conroy (archer) =

Irish archer (born 1943)

Personal information
- Nationality: Irish
- Born: 28 April 1943 (age 81)

Sport
- Sport: Archery

James Conroy (born 28 April 1943) is an Irish archer. He competed at the 1976 Summer Olympics and the 1980 Summer Olympics.
