= Gino Iseppi =

Italian rower

Personal information
- Nationality: Italian
- Born: 6 October 1957 (age 67); Turin, Italy

Sport
- Sport: Rowing

Gino Iseppi (born 6 October 1957) is an Italian rower. He competed at the 1976 Summer Olympics and the 1984 Summer Olympics.
