= Darrara =

Townland in County Cork, Ireland

Coordinates: 51.631°N 8.845°W

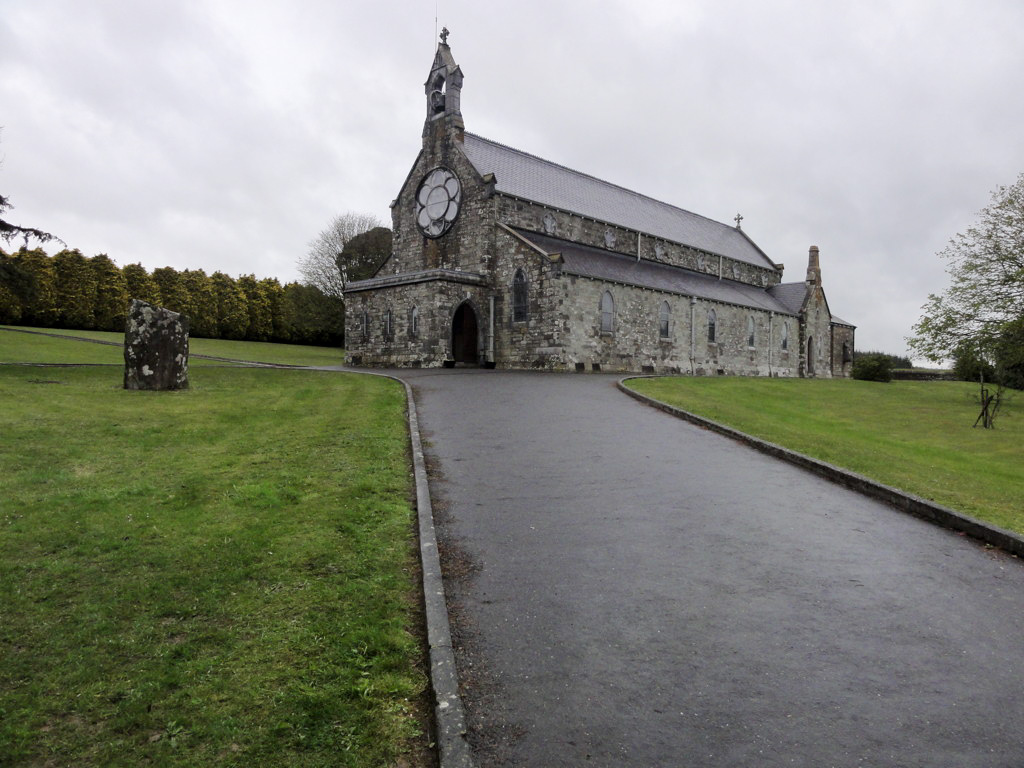
Roman Catholic church (and standing stone) in Darrara

Darrara or Darrary (Irish: Dairbhre) is a rural townland near Clonakilty, County Cork in Ireland. The townland, of 1.4 km^{2} (0.54 sq mi), is home to Teagasc's Clonakilty Agricultural College (some structures of which date to the 1880s) and Sacred Heart Roman Catholic Church (built in 1897). Evidence of ancient settlement in the area include a restored Iron Age ringfort and a megalithic standing stone (on the grounds of Sacred Heart church).

== See also ==
- Lios na gCon
