= Adrie Klem =

Dutch rower

Personal information
- Full name: Adrianus Klem
- Nationality: Dutch
- Born: 6 May 1951 (age 73); Delft, Netherlands

Sport
- Sport: Rowing

Adrianus "Adrie" Klem (born 6 May 1951) is a Dutch rower. He competed in the men's coxed four event at the 1976 Summer Olympics.
