= Jos Ruijs =

Dutch rower (born 1955)

Personal information
- Nationality: Dutch
- Born: 18 March 1955 (age 70); Zeist, Netherlands

Sport
- Sport: Rowing

Jos Ruijs (born 18 March 1955) is a Dutch rower. He competed in the men's coxed four event at the 1976 Summer Olympics.
