= Christy O'Brien (rower) =

Irish rower

Personal information
- Nationality: Irish
- Born: 9 December 1949 (age 75)

Sport
- Sport: Rowing

Christy O'Brien (born 9 December 1949) is an Irish rower. He competed at the 1976 Summer Olympics and the 1980 Summer Olympics.
