= Willie Ryan (rower) =

Irish rower

Personal information
- Nationality: Irish
- Born: 28 September 1953 (age 72)
- Relative(s): Ted Ryan (brother); Caroline Ryan (daughter)

Sport
- Sport: Rowing

Willie Ryan (born 28 September 1953) is an Irish rower. He competed at the 1976 Summer Olympics and the 1980 Summer Olympics.

Willie and his brother Ted are originally from Darrara, County Cork however he now lives in Kildare. He was a member of An Garda Siochana and only began rowing when he joined the police force.

His daughter Caroline was also a very successful athlete being the first Irish woman to win a trophy at Henley Royal Regatta and later switching to cycling where she represented Ireland.
