= Jean-Jacques Mulot =

French rower

Personal information
- Nationality: French
- Born: 21 September 1948 (age 76)

Sport
- Sport: Rowing

Jean-Jacques Mulot (born 21 September 1948) is a French rower. He competed at the 1972 Summer Olympics and the 1976 Summer Olympics.
