= Dênis Marinho =

Brazilian rower

Personal information
- Nationality: Brazilian
- Born: 21 January 1963 (age 62); Paris, France

Sport
- Sport: Rowing

Dênis Marinho (born 21 January 1963) is a Brazilian rower. He competed at the 1984 Summer Olympics and the 1988 Summer Olympics.
