= Martin Baltus =

Dutch rower

Personal information
- Nationality: Dutch
- Born: 18 October 1953 (age 71); Castricum, Netherlands

Sport
- Sport: Rowing

Martin Baltus (born 18 October 1953) is a Dutch rower. He competed in the men's coxed four event at the 1976 Summer Olympics.
