= Petone Rowing Club =

New Zealand rowing club

- Location: Wellington, New Zealand
- Founded: 1900
- Affiliations: Rowing NZ, WRA
- Website: www.petonerowing.club

The Petone Rowing Club (PRC) is a non-profit organisation, located on the Petone foreshore, in the harbour of Wellington, New Zealand. Formed in the year 1900, the club has a long-standing history of developing champion rowers, with a proud history filled with local, regional, national, international, and Olympic achievements. The club is governed by a member elected committee. The committee controls all aspects of the club.

The most notable club champions, who have represented New Zealand at international rowing regattas such as the Commonwealth Games, the World Rowing Championships, and Olympics include Des Lock, Ian Boserio, Pat Abbott, Tim Logan and Viv Haar.

== History ==
=== International achievements ===
Petone club members have consistently been selected as New Zealand representatives since 1950. Jack McCarten was the first person to be selected, he represented New Zealand at the 1950 British Empire Games. Numerous more have been selected since then.

In the 1970s the PRC enjoyed the greatest successes, in 1974 Des Lock represented New Zealand at the World Rowing Championships, Bill Vine represented New Zealand as the New Zealand Colts Manager, and a young Viv Harr represented New Zealand as a New Zealand Colt. In the 1975 World Rowing Championships the selection of a Petone club member was repeated by Ian Boserio. Ruby Willis was selected for the World Rowing Junior Championships held in Rio in 2015.

Petone club members have completed at the Henley Regatta.

Many Petone rowers hold world records for time trails at indoor racing events that are held all over the world, including Izzy Ahearn who in 2016 obtained the world indoor rowing record across a marathon distance for girls aged between 15 and 16.

=== National achievements ===
Petone Rowing Club was named Rowing New Zealand's club of the year in 2014.

=== Uniform ===
When the club was first formed the uniform was very different from the one we see today. It consisted of white trousers, a white cap with red buttons, a white singlet with a broad red sash, and a boater hat with a red band. By the 1960s the uniform had changed to gold singlets and black shorts. Currently the Petone uniform is fluorescent yellow singlets and black shorts.

=== Roll of Honour ===
World War I and World War II both had huge effects on most societies around the world. Petone Rowing Club was not excluded from this. Twenty-one men fought in World War I from Petone rowing club. Four of these men lost their lives. Sixty-two men fought in World War II and seven of them lost their lives.
