= Rowing at the 1976 Summer Olympics – Men's coxless four =

Men's coxless four at the Games of the XXI Olympiad
- Venue: Olympic basin at Notre Dame Island
- Date: 18–25 July 1976
- Competitors: 61 from 15 nations
- Teams: 15
- Winning time: 6:37.42

Medalists
1st place, gold medalist(s)		Siegfried Brietzke; Andreas Decker; Stefan Semmler; Wolfgang Mager	East Germany
2nd place, silver medalist(s)		Ole Nafstad; Arne Bergodd; Finn Tveter; Rolf Andreassen	Norway
3rd place, bronze medalist(s)		Raul Arnemann; Nikolay Kuznetsov; Valeriy Dolinin; Anushavan Gassan-Dzhalalov	Soviet Union

The men's coxless four (M4-) competition at the 1976 Summer Olympics took place at the rowing basin on Notre Dame Island in Montreal, Quebec, Canada. It was held from 18 to 25 July and was won by the team from East Germany.

== Background ==
The East German team was the undisputed favourite going into this event. Over the last few years, their rowers had won this class at almost all major regattas. After West Germany won the inaugural world championships in 1962, East Germany won all subsequent events in 1966, 1970, and 1974. Of the last four European Rowing Championships (the event was discontinued after 1973), they won gold in three of four of the events (1967, 1971, and 1973), and bronze in 1969. Other favourites included the Soviet Union and West Germany.

=== Previous M4- competitions ===
Competition	Gold	Silver	Bronze
1966 World Rowing Championships	East Germany	Soviet Union	Netherlands
1967 European Rowing Championships	East Germany	?	?
1968 Summer Olympics	East Germany	Hungary	Italy
1969 European Rowing Championships	?	?	East Germany
1970 World Rowing Championships	East Germany	West Germany	Denmark
1971 European Rowing Championships	East Germany	Norway	West Germany
1972 Summer Olympics	East Germany	New Zealand	West Germany
1973 European Rowing Championships	East Germany	Norway	West Germany
1974 World Rowing Championships	East Germany	Soviet Union	West Germany
1975 World Rowing Championships	East Germany	Soviet Union	Romania

== Results ==
=== Heats ===
==== Heat 1 ====
Rank	Rower	Country	Time	Notes
1	Tony Brooks; Jim Moroney; Gary Piantedosi; Hugh Stevenson	United States	6:15.07	SF
2	Matteo Caglieris; Pellegrino Croce; Enzo Lanzarini; Natale Spinello	Italy	6:16.10	SF
3	Rumyan Khristov; Todor Mrankov; Dimitar Valov; Dimitar Yanakiev	Bulgaria	6:20.71	SF
4	Ernest Gal; Dumitru Grumezescu; Nicolae Simion; Ștefan Tudor	Romania	6:23.12	R
5	Jorma Hurme; Erkka Mattila; Pekka Pietilä; Matti Salminen	Finland	6:38.91	R

==== Heat 2 ====
Rank	Rower	Country	Time	Notes
1	Bernhard Fölkel; Wolfgang Horak; Gabriel Konertz; Klaus Meyer	West Germany	6:15.08	SF
2	Richard Ayling; Neil Keron; Bill Mason; David Townsend	Great Britain	6:16.32	SF
3	Paul De Weert; Frank Dedecker; Johan Ghoos; Jozef Jordaens	Belgium	6:20.07	SF
4	Martin Feeley; Iain Kennedy; Andy McDonough; Jaye Renehan	Ireland	6:25.57	R
5	Carlos Denari; Marcelo Gismondi; Jorge Molina; Juan Tuma	Argentina	6:49.33	R

==== Heat 3 ====
The five teams in heat 3 of the elimination round eventually took the first five places in the A final.

Rank	Rower	Country	Time	Notes
1	Siegfried Brietzke; Andreas Decker; Wolfgang Mager; Stefan Semmler	East Germany	6:02.55	SF
2	Raul Arnemann; Valeriy Dolinin; Anushavan Gassan-Dzhalalov; Nikolay Kuznetsov	Soviet Union	6:05.57	SF
3	David Lindstrom; Des Lock; Grant McAuley; Bob Murphy	New Zealand	6:06.40	SF
4	Rolf Andreassen; Arne Bergodd; Ole Nafstad; Finn Tveter	Norway	6:06.70	R
5	Brian Dick; Ian Gordon; Phil Monckton; Andrew van Ruyven	Canada	6:13.09	R

=== Repechage ===
The Norwegian and Argentinian teams changed three seats. The teams from Canada, Romania, and Finland changed all four seats.

Rank	Rower	Country	Time	Notes
1	Ole Nafstad; Arne Bergodd; Finn Tveter; Rolf Andreassen	Norway	6:08.66	SF
2	Andrew van Ruyven; Phil Monckton; Ian Gordon; Brian Dick	Canada	6:08.69	SF
3	Nicolae Simion; Ernest Gal; Ștefan Tudor; Dumitru Grumezescu	Romania	6:09.55	SF
4	Erkka Mattila; Matti Salminen; Jorma Hurme; Pekka Pietilä	Finland	6:21.54	
5	Martin Feeley; Iain Kennedy; Jaye Renehan; Andy McDonough	Ireland	6:29.27	
6	Jorge Molina; Marcelo Gismondi; Juan Tuma; Carlos Denari	Argentina	6:30.56	

=== Semifinals ===
==== Heat 1 ====
The East German team swapped seats 3 and 4. The teams from Great Britain and Bulgaria swapped all four seats.

Rank	Rower	Country	Time	Notes
1	Siegfried Brietzke; Andreas Decker; Stefan Semmler; Wolfgang Mager	East Germany	5:53.65	SA
2	Andrew van Ruyven; Phil Monckton; Ian Gordon; Brian Dick	Canada	5:59.21	SA
3	David Lindstrom; Des Lock; Grant McAuley; Bob Murphy	New Zealand	6:00.82	SA
4	Tony Brooks; Jim Moroney; Gary Piantedosi; Hugh Stevenson	United States	6:03.79	SB
5	Todor Mrankov; Dimitar Yanakiev; Rumyan Khristov; Dimitar Valov	Bulgaria	6:06.58	SB
6	Neil Keron; David Townsend; Richard Ayling; Bill Mason	Great Britain	6:08.71	SB

==== Heat 2 ====
The teams from the Soviet Union and Belgium changed all four seats. West Germany replaced Klaus Meyer with Klaus Roloff, and only the stroke remained in his seat. Italy changed three seats.

Rank	Rower	Country	Time	Notes
1	Ole Nafstad; Arne Bergodd; Finn Tveter; Rolf Andreassen	Norway	6:02.84	SA
2	Valeriy Dolinin; Anushavan Gassan-Dzhalalov; Nikolay Kuznetsov; Raul Arnemann	Soviet Union	6:03.05	SA
3	Bernhard Fölkel; Klaus Roloff; Wolfgang Horak; Gabriel Konertz	West Germany	6:05.39	SA
4	Nicolae Simion; Ernest Gal; Ștefan Tudor; Dumitru Grumezescu	Romania	6:07.71	SB
5	Matteo Caglieris; Enzo Lanzarini; Natale Spinello; Pellegrino Croce	Italy	6:09.76	SB
6	Johan Ghoos; Paul De Weert; Jozef Jordaens; Frank Dedecker	Belgium	6:18.33	SB

=== Finals ===
==== B final ====
The Bulgarian team changed three of the seats.

Rank	Rower	Country	Time
7	Dimitar Valov; Dimitar Yanakiev; Todor Mrankov; Rumyan Khristov	Bulgaria	6:41.36
8	Tony Brooks; Jim Moroney; Gary Piantedosi; Hugh Stevenson	United States	6:43.06
9	Nicolae Simion; Ernest Gal; Ștefan Tudor; Dumitru Grumezescu	Romania	6:43.96
10	Johan Ghoos; Paul De Weert; Jozef Jordaens; Frank Dedecker	Belgium	6:47.51
11	Matteo Caglieris; Enzo Lanzarini; Natale Spinello; Pellegrino Croce	Italy	6:48.11
12	Neil Keron; David Townsend; Richard Ayling; Bill Mason	Great Britain	6:53.02

==== A final ====
For the second time, the Soviet Union changed all four seats. The New Zealand team changed all four seats. The Canadians changed three seats. As expected, East Germany won the gold medal; they had dominated all their races and won their qualifying heat 12 seconds faster than the other heats. The surprise winner of the silver medal was the team from Norway, who left the much more highly rated Soviet Union with bronze.

Rank	Rower	Country	Time
1st place, gold medalist(s)	Siegfried Brietzke; Andreas Decker; Stefan Semmler; Wolfgang Mager	East Germany	6:37.42
2nd place, silver medalist(s)	Ole Nafstad; Arne Bergodd; Finn Tveter; Rolf Andreassen	Norway	6:41.22
3rd place, bronze medalist(s)	Raul Arnemann; Nikolay Kuznetsov; Valeriy Dolinin; Anushavan Gassan-Dzhalalov	Soviet Union	6:42.52
4	Bob Murphy; Grant McAuley; Des Lock; David Lindstrom	New Zealand	6:43.23
5	Brian Dick; Phil Monckton; Andrew van Ruyven; Ian Gordon	Canada	6:46.11
6	Bernhard Fölkel; Klaus Roloff; Wolfgang Horak; Gabriel Konertz	West Germany	6:47.44
