= New Zealand at the 1976 Summer Olympics =

- IOC code: NZL
- NOC: New Zealand Olympic and Commonwealth Games Association
- Website: www.olympic.org.nz

in Montreal
- Competitors: 80 (71 men, 9 women) in 13 sports
- Flag bearer: David Aspin (wrestling)
- Medals Ranked 18th: Gold 2 Silver 1 Bronze 1 Total 4

Summer Olympics appearances (overview)
- 1908; 1912; 1920; 1924; 1928; 1932; 1936; 1948; 1952; 1956; 1960; 1964; 1968; 1972; 1976; 1980; 1984; 1988; 1992; 1996; 2000; 2004; 2008; 2012; 2016; 2020; 2024; 2028

Other related appearances
- Australasia (1908–1912)

New Zealand competed at the 1976 Summer Olympics in Montreal, Quebec, Canada. The New Zealand Olympic Committee was represented by 80 athletes, 71 men and 9 women, and 29 officials. The flag bearer at the opening ceremony was wrestler David Aspin.

In protest at a tour of South Africa by the All Blacks team early in the year, Congo's official Jean-Claude Ganga led a boycott of 28 African nations as the International Olympic Committee refused to bar the New Zealand team. Some of the nations (including Morocco, Cameroon and Egypt) had already participated however, as the teams only withdrew after the first day. From Southern and Central Africa, only Senegal and Ivory Coast took part. Both Iraq and Guyana also opted to join the Congolese-led boycott. For the full list of boycotting countries, see 1976 Summer Olympics#Non-participating National Olympic Committees

== Medal tables ==
Medal	Name	Sport	Event	Date
Gold	New Zealand men's hockey team: Paul Ackerley; Jeff Archibald; Arthur Borren; Alan Chesney; John Christensen; Greg Dayman; Tony Ineson; Barry Maister; Selwyn Maister; Trevor Manning; Alan McIntyre; Arthur Parkin; Mohan Patel; Ramesh Patel	Field hockey	Men's tournament	30 July
Gold	John Walker	Athletics	Men's 1500 m	31 July
Silver	Dick Quax	Athletics	Men's 5000 m	30 July
Bronze	Ivan Sutherland; Trevor Coker; Peter Dignan; Lindsay Wilson; Joe Earl; Dave Rodger; Alec McLean; Tony Hurt; Simon Dickie (cox)	Rowing	Men's eight	25 July

Medals by sport
Sport	Gold medal	Silver medal	Bronze medal	Total
Athletics	1	1	0	2
Field hockey	1	0	0	1
Rowing	0	0	1	1
Total	2	1	1	4

Medals by gender
Gender	Gold medal	Silver medal	Bronze medal	Total
Male	2	1	1	4
Female	0	0	0	0
Total	2	1	1	4

== Athletics ==
=== Track and road ===
Athlete	Event	Heat		Quarterfinal		Semifinal		Final	
Athlete	Event	Result	Rank (Note: Ranks given are within the heat)	Result	Rank (Note: Ranks given are within the quarterfinal)	Result	Rank (Note: Ranks given are within the semifinal)	Result	Rank
Rod Dixon	Men's 5000 m	13:20.48	2 Q	—N/a				13:25.50	4
Jack Foster	Men's marathon	—N/a						2:17:53	17
Anne Garrett	Women's 800 m	2:05.78	7	—N/a		did not advance			
Anne Garrett	Women's 1500 m	4:10.68	7	—N/a		did not advance			
Sue Jowett	Women's 100 m	11.70	3 Q	11.81	8	did not advance			
Sue Jowett	Women's 200 m	24.12	2 Q	24.23	8	did not advance			
Dick Quax	Men's 5000 m	13:30.85	1 Q	—N/a				13:25.16	2nd place, silver medalist(s)
Euan Robertson	Men's 3000 m steeplechase	8:26.31	5 Q	—N/a				8:21.08	5
Kevin Ryan	Men's marathon	—N/a						DNF	
John Walker	Men's 800 m	1:47.63	3	—N/a		did not advance			
John Walker	Men's 1500 m	3:36.87	1 Q	—N/a		3:39.65	1 Q	3:39.17	1st place, gold medalist(s)
Dianne Zorn	Women's 1500 m	4:12.81	7	—N/a		did not advance			

=== Field ===
Athlete	Event	Qualification		Final	
Athlete	Event	Result	Rank	Result	Rank
Murray Cheater	Men's hammer throw	67.38	16	did not advance	

== Boxing ==
Athlete	Event	Round of 64	Round of 32	Round of 16	Quarterfinals	Semifinals	Final	Rank
Athlete	Event	Opposition Result	Opposition Result	Opposition Result	Opposition Result	Opposition Result	Opposition Result	Rank
Robert Colley	Men's light welterweight	Limasov (URS); L RSC-3	Did not advance					=25
David Jackson	Men's welterweight	Chtioui (TUN); W RSC-2	Rachkov (URS); L 0 – 5	Did not advance				=17

== Canoeing ==
Athlete	Event	Heats		Repechages		Semifinals		Final	
Athlete	Event	Time	Rank	Time	Rank	Time	Rank	Time	Rank
Donald Cooper	Men's K-1 1000 m	4:04.29	5 R	3:55.52	2 Q	3:53.21	4	did not advance	
Ian Ferguson	Men's K-1 500 m	1:59.18	4 R	1:53.65	4	did not advance			
Rod Gavin; John Leonard	Men's K-2 500 m	1:47.03	5 R	1:47.45	3 Q	1:45.61	6	did not advance	
Rod Gavin; John Leonard	Men's K-2 1000 m	3:37.09	5 R	3:35.28	5	did not advance			

== Cycling ==
Four cyclists represented New Zealand in 1976.

=== Road ===
Men's individual road race

Athlete	Time	Rank
Garry Bell	4:49:01	15
Vern Hanaray	5:00:19	52
Jamie Richards	DNF	

=== Track ===
Men's individual pursuit

Athlete	Qualification		Round 1	Quarterfinals	Semifinals	Final	Rank
Athlete	Time	Rank	Opposition Time	Opposition Time	Opposition Time	Opposition Time	Rank
Mike Richards	4:55.08	9 Q	Iversen (NOR); L 4:53.33	did not advance			9

== Diving ==
Athlete	Event	Preliminaries		Final	
Athlete	Event	Points	Rank	Points	Rank
Rebecca Ewert	Women's 3 m springboard	352.62	21	did not advance	

== Equestrian ==
=== Jumping ===
Athlete	Horse	Event	Round 1		Round 2		Overall	
Athlete	Horse	Event	Faults	Rank	Faults	Rank	Faults	Rank
Joe Yorke	Big Red	Individual	20.00	=30	did not advance			

== Field hockey ==
=== Men's tournament ===
Team roster

Paul Ackerley; Jeff Archibald; Arthur Borren; Alan Chesney; John Christensen; Greg Dayman; Tony Ineson; Barry Maister	Selwyn Maister; Trevor Manning; Neil McLeod; Alan McIntyre; Arthur Parkin; Mohan Patel; Ramesh Patel; Les Wilson

Head coach

Ross Gillespie

Group B

18 July 1976

West Germany	1–1	New Zealand
	Report

20 July 1976

Spain	1–1	New Zealand
	Report

21 July 1976

New Zealand	2–1	Belgium
	Report

24 July 1976

Pakistan	5–2	New Zealand
	Report

Pos	Team	Pld	W	D	L	GF	GA	GD	Pts	Qualification
1	Pakistan	4	3	1	0	16	6	+10	7	Semi-finals
2	New Zealand	4	1	2	1	6	8	−2	4 (Note: New Zealand and Spain finished on equal points at the conclusion of the pool stage, resulting in a match to determine second place in the pool. The match was contested on 26 July 1976 and New Zealand won 1–0.)	Semi-finals
3	Spain	4	1	2	1	9	7	+2	4	
4	West Germany	4	1	1	2	10	10	0	3	
5	Belgium	4	1	0	3	5	15	−10	2	
6	Kenya	0	0	0	0	0	0	0	0	Withdrew

Source: Olympedia
Notes:

Group B play-off

26 July 1976

Spain	0–1 (a.e.t.)	New Zealand
	Report

New Zealand advanced to the semi-finals, while Spain continued to the classification round for fifth to eighth places.

Semi-final

29 July 1976

Netherlands	1–2 (a.e.t.)	New Zealand
	Report

Final

30 July 1976

New Zealand	1–0	Australia
Ineson	Report

Neil McLeod and Les Wilson were not awarded gold medals as they did not take the field during the tournament. The gold medal won by the New Zealand men's team in 1976 remains the only Olympic field hockey medal won by a New Zealand team.

== Rowing ==
=== Men ===
Athlete	Event	Heats		Repechage		Semifinals		Final	
Athlete	Event	Time	Rank	Time	Rank	Time	Rank	Time	Rank
Bob Murphy; Grant McAuley; Des Lock; David Lindstrom	Coxless four	6:06.40	3 SA/B	Bye		6:00.82	3 FA	6:43.23	4
Viv Haar; Danny Keane; Tim Logan; Ian Boserio; David Simmons (cox)	Coxed four	6:06.40	3 SA/B	Bye		6:00.82	3 FA	6:43.23	4
Ivan Sutherland; Trevor Coker; Peter Dignan; Lindsay Wilson; Joe Earl; Dave Rodger; Alec McLean; Tony Hurt; Simon Dickie (cox)	Eight	5:40.00	2 R	5:37.08	1 FA	—N/a		6:03.51	3rd place, bronze medalist(s)

== Sailing ==
Athlete	Event	Race							Net points	Final rank
Athlete	Event	1	2	3	4	5	6	7	Net points	Final rank
Brett Bennett; Mark Paterson (helm)	470	5.7	~~37.0~~; ~~PMS~~	16.0	3.0	10.0	3.0	22.0	59.7	5
Jock Bilger (helm); Murray Ross	Flying Dutchman	13.0	14.0	0.0	21.0	18.0	19.0	~~23.0~~	85.0	12
Gavin Bornholdt; Hugh Poole (helm); Chris Urry	Soling	~~26.0~~	21.0	23.0	21.0	25.0	21.0	24.0	135.0	19
Jonty Farmer	Finn	~~25.0~~	10.0	21.0	19.0	21.0	17.0	21.0	109.0	15

== Shooting ==
Mixed 50 m rifle, prone

Athlete	Round 1	Round 2	Round 3	Round 4	Round 5	Round 6	Total	Rank
Ian Ballinger	100	98	100	94	98	100	590	=20

Mixed 50 m running target

Athlete	Slow run	Fast run	Total	Rank
Graeme McIntyre	279	268	547	19
Grant Taylor	257	279	536	24

Mixed skeet

Athlete	Round 1	Round 2	Round 3	Round 4	Round 5	Round 6	Round 7	Round 8	Total	Rank
John Woolley									190	=26

== Swimming ==
Athlete	Event	Heat		Semifinal		Final	
Athlete	Event	Result	Rank	Result	Rank	Result	Rank
Allison Calder	Women's 400 m freestyle	4:23.64	15	—N/a		did not advance	
Allison Calder	Women's 800 m freestyle	8:57.24	11	—N/a		did not advance	
John Coutts	Men's 100 m butterfly	57.29	18	did not advance			
John Coutts	Men's 200 m butterfly	2:05.05	16	—N/a		did not advance	
Susan Hunter	Women's 200 m backstroke	2:26.21	23	—N/a		did not advance	
Susan Hunter	Women's 400 m individual medley	5:03.82	10	—N/a		did not advance	
John McConnochie	Men's 200 m freestyle	1:57.77	33	—N/a		did not advance	
John McConnochie	Men's 400 m individual medley	4:40.84	17	—N/a		did not advance	
Brett Naylor	Men's 400 m freestyle	4:00.38	10	—N/a		did not advance	
Brett Naylor	Men's 1500 m freestyle	15:52.68	16	—N/a		did not advance	
Rebecca Perrott	Women's 100 m freestyle	57.66	8 Q	58.13	13	did not advance	
Rebecca Perrott	Women's 200 m freestyle	2:03.94	=9	—N/a		did not advance	
Rebecca Perrott	Women's 400 m freestyle	4:15.71 OR	1 Q	—N/a		4:14.76	4
Monique Rodahl	Women's 100 m backstroke	1:06.73	22	did not advance			
Monique Rodahl	Women's 200 m backstroke	2:19.22	11	—N/a		did not advance	
Monique Rodahl	Women's 400 m individual medley	4:58.47	7 Q	—N/a		5:00.21	8
Lynne Rowe	Women's 100 m butterfly	1:04.23	16 Q	1:04.06	=14	did not advance	
Lynne Rowe	Women's 200 m butterfly	2:17.89	13	—N/a		did not advance	
Lynne Rowe	Women's 400 m individual medley	5:09.21	13	—N/a		did not advance	
Mark Treffers	Men's 400 m individual medley	4:40.92	18	—N/a		did not advance	
Mark Treffers	Men's 1500 m freestyle	15:56.11	17	—N/a		did not advance	

== Weightlifting ==
Athlete	Event	Snatch		Clean & jerk		Total	Rank
Athlete	Event	Result	Rank	Result	Rank	Total	Rank
Rory Barrett	Men's heavyweight	150	=15	192.5	13	342.5	15
Brian Marsden	Men's middle heavyweight	137.5	=16	185.0	8	322.5	11
Phillip Sue	Men's lightweight	NVL		—N/a			DNF

== Wrestling ==
Athlete	Event	Round 1	Round 2	Round 3	Round 4	Round 5	Round 6	Final	Rank
Athlete	Event	Opposition Result	Opposition Result	Opposition Result	Opposition Result	Opposition Result	Opposition Result	Opposition Result	Rank
David Aspin	Men's freestyle middleweight	Chimidiin (MGL); L Fall	Motegi (JPN); L Fall	Eliminated					
Barry Oldridge	Men's freestyle bantamweight	Darlev (YUG); L 0 – 24	Hatziioannidis (GRE); L Fall	Eliminated					

== Officials ==
- Team manager – Bill Holley
- Assistant team manager – D. M. Taylor
- Chaperone – Valerie Young
- Team doctor – Graeme Campbell
- Physiotherapist – Peter Stokes
- Attache – C. J. Adair
- Athletics
  - Section manager – Dave Leech
  - Coach – Arch Jelley
- Boxing section manager – Alan Scaife
- Canoeing section manager – Sandy Pigott
- Cycling
  - Section manager – Neil Lyster
  - Coach / mechanic – Wayne Thorpe
- Equestrian
  - Section manager – Ian Nimon
  - Trainer – Lockie Richards
  - Groom – Karen Yorke
- Hockey
  - Section manager – Tony Palmer
  - Coach – Ross Gillespie
- Rowing
  - Section manager – Kerry Ashby
  - Coach (eight) – Rusty Robertson
  - Coach / boatman – J. T. Reid
  - Transport manager – Brian Heyward
- Sailing
  - Section manager – Don St Clair Brown
  - Meteorologist / boatman – Harry Kingham
- Shooting section manager – Ian Wright
- Swimming
  - Section manager – Noel Smith
  - Chief coach – Bert Cotterill
  - Assistant coach – Duncan Laing
- Weightlifting section manager – Bruce Cameron
- Wrestling section manager – Keith Breeze
