= Rowing at the 1972 Summer Olympics – Men's coxless pair =

Men's coxless pair at the Games of the XX Olympiad
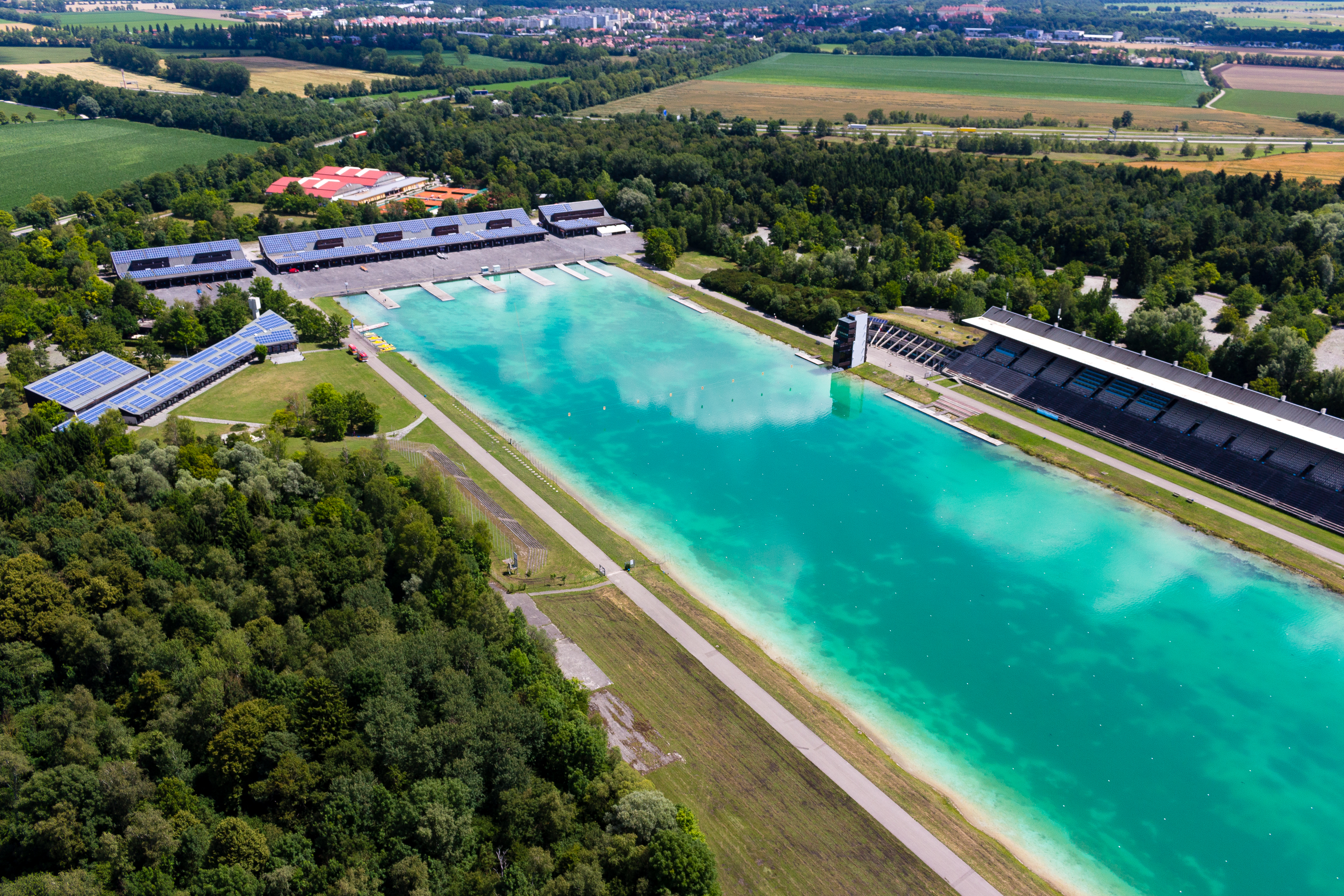
- Aerial view of the venue in Oberschleißheim
- Venue: Oberschleißheim Regatta Course
- Date: 27 August – 2 September 1972
- Competitors: 38; (19 teams) from 19 nations
- Winning time: 6:53.16

Medalists
| 1st place, gold medalist(s) | | Siegfried Brietzke; Wolfgang Mager | East Germany |
| 2nd place, silver medalist(s) | | Heinrich Fischer; Alfred Bachmann | Switzerland |
| 3rd place, bronze medalist(s) | | Roel Luynenburg; Ruud Stokvis | Netherlands |

The men's coxless pair competition at the 1972 Summer Olympics in Munich took place from 27 August – 2 September at the Olympic Reggatta Course in Oberschleißheim.

== Results ==
=== Heats ===
Winner of each heat (green) qualify to the semifinal round, remainder goes to the repechage.

==== Heat 1 ====
| Rank | Rower | Country | Time |
|---|---|---|---|
| 1 | Erwin Haas; Lutz Ulbricht | West Germany | 7:22.94 |
| 2 | Ilie Oantă; Dumitru Grumezescu | Romania | 7:28.03 |
| 3 | Jeremiah McCarthy; Matthew Cooper | Great Britain | 7:30.62 |
| 4 | László Balogh; György Sarlós | Hungary | 7:49.70 |
| 5 | José Luis Rion; Miguel Ruiz | Mexico | 7:59.53 |

==== Heat 2 ====
| Rank | Rower | Country | Time |
|---|---|---|---|
| 1 | Heinrich Fischer; Alfred Bachmann | Switzerland | 7:20.51 |
| 2 | Alfons Ślusarski; Jerzy Broniec | Poland | 7:24.16 |
| 3 | Roel Luynenburg; Ruud Stokvis | Netherlands | 7:26.80 |
| 4 | Larry Hough; Dick Lyon | United States | 7:33.16 |
| 5 | Hans Fortmüller; Ulli Wolf | Austria | 7:38.53 |

==== Heat 3 ====
| Rank | Rower | Country | Time |
|---|---|---|---|
| 1 | Vladimir Polyakov; Nikolai Vasilyev | Soviet Union | 7:28.97 |
| 2 | Erik Erichsen; Åke Fiskerstrand | Norway | 7:34.89 |
| 3 | Kim Mackney; Chris Stevens | Australia | 7:39.03 |
| 4 | Raúl Bagattini; Érico de Souza | Brazil | 7:42.02 |
| 5 | Ri Jong-hui; Li Jong-un | North Korea | 8:04.91 |

==== Heat 4 ====
| Rank | Rower | Country | Time |
|---|---|---|---|
| 1 | Siegfried Brietzke; Wolfgang Mager | East Germany | 7:20.35 |
| 2 | Lubomír Zapletal; Petr Lakomý | Czechoslovakia | 7:25.92 |
| 3 | Duško Mrduljaš; Nikola Mardešić | Yugoslavia | 7:40.47 |
| 4 | Andrew van Ruyven; Richard Symsyk | Canada | 7:46.90 |

=== Repechage ===
Top two finishers in each heat qualify to the semifinal round.

==== Repechage 1 ====
| Rank | Rower | Country | Time |
|---|---|---|---|
| 1 | Lubomír Zapletal; Petr Lakomý | Czechoslovakia | 7:34.16 |
| 2 | Larry Hough; Dick Lyon | United States | 7:37.34 |
| 3 | Kim Mackney; Chris Stevens | Australia | 7:45.03 |
| 4 | José Luis Rion; Miguel Ruiz | Mexico | 8:15.97 |

==== Repechage 2 ====
| Rank | Rower | Country | Time |
|---|---|---|---|
| 1 | Roel Luynenburg; Ruud Stokvis | Netherlands | 7:38.51 |
| 2 | Erik Erichsen; Åke Fiskerstrand | Norway | 7:50.21 |
| 3 | László Balogh; György Sarlós | Hungary | 7:59.40 |

==== Repechage 3 ====
| Rank | Rower | Country | Time |
|---|---|---|---|
| 1 | Alfons Ślusarski; Jerzy Broniec | Poland | 7:34.77 |
| 2 | Jeremiah McCarthy; Matthew Cooper | Great Britain | 7:40.78 |
| 3 | Andrew van Ruyven; Richard Symsyk | Canada | 7:45.71 |
| 4 | Ri Jong-hui; Li Jong-un | North Korea | 7:56.42 |

==== Repechage 4 ====
| Rank | Rower | Country | Time |
|---|---|---|---|
| 1 | Ilie Oantă; Dumitru Grumezescu | Romania | 7:30.45 |
| 2 | Duško Mrduljaš; Nikola Mardešić | Yugoslavia | 7:40.84 |
| 3 | Raúl Bagattini; Érico de Souza | Brazil | 7:42.63 |
| 4 | Hans Fortmüller; Ulli Wolf | Austria | 7:44.45 |

=== Semifinals ===
==== Semifinal A/B ====
First three qualify to the Final A, remainder to Final B.

===== Semifinal 1 =====
| Rank | Rower | Country | Time |
|---|---|---|---|
| 1 | Alfons Ślusarski; Jerzy Broniec | Poland | 7:42.41 |
| 2 | Heinrich Fischer; Alfred Bachmann | Switzerland | 7:44.91 |
| 3 | Ilie Oantă; Dumitru Grumezescu | Romania | 7:47.77 |
| 4 | Larry Hough; Dick Lyon | United States | 7:50.26 |
| 5 | Erik Erichsen; Åke Fiskerstrand | Norway | 7:57.27 |
| 6 | Erwin Haas; Lutz Ulbricht | West Germany | 8:06.06 |

===== Semifinal 2 =====
| Rank | Rower | Country | Time |
|---|---|---|---|
| 1 | Siegfried Brietzke; Wolfgang Mager | East Germany | 7:40.58 |
| 2 | Roel Luynenburg; Ruud Stokvis | Netherlands | 7:41.86 |
| 3 | Lubomír Zapletal; Petr Lakomý | Czechoslovakia | 7:45.11 |
| 4 | Vladimir Polyakov; Nikolai Vasilyev | Soviet Union | 7:46.18 |
| 5 | Jeremiah McCarthy; Matthew Cooper | Great Britain | 7:56.59 |
| 6 | Duško Mrduljaš; Nikola Mardešić | Yugoslavia | 8:01.58 |

=== Finals ===
==== Final B ====
| Rank | Rower | Country | Time |
|---|---|---|---|
| 1 | Erwin Haas; Lutz Ulbricht | West Germany | 7:31.02 |
| 2 | Vladimir Polyakov; Nikolai Vasilyev | Soviet Union | 7:34.37 |
| 3 | Larry Hough; Dick Lyon | United States | 7:38.64 |
| 4 | Erik Erichsen; Åke Fiskerstrand | Norway | 7:40.55 |
| 5 | Duško Mrduljaš; Nikola Mardešić | Yugoslavia | 7:43.20 |
| 6 | Jeremiah McCarthy; Matthew Cooper | Great Britain | 7:51.01 |

==== Final A ====
| Rank | Rower | Country | Time |
|---|---|---|---|
| 1st place, gold medalist(s) | Siegfried Brietzke; Wolfgang Mager | East Germany | 6:53.16 |
| 2nd place, silver medalist(s) | Heinrich Fischer; Alfred Bachmann | Switzerland | 6:57.06 |
| 3rd place, bronze medalist(s) | Roel Luynenburg; Ruud Stokvis | Netherlands | 6:58.70 |
| 4 | Lubomír Zapletal; Petr Lakomý | Czechoslovakia | 6:58.77 |
| 5 | Alfons Ślusarski; Jerzy Broniec | Poland | 7:02.24 |
| 6 | Ilie Oantă; Dumitru Grumezescu | Romania | 7:42.90 |
