= Norway at the 1976 Summer Olympics =

- IOC code: NOR
- NOC: Norwegian Olympic Committee

in Montreal
- Competitors: 66 (60 men and 6 women) in 11 sports
- Flag bearer: Leif Jenssen (weightlifting)
- Medals Ranked 21st: Gold 1 Silver 1 Bronze 0 Total 2

Summer Olympics appearances (overview)
- 1900; 1904; 1908; 1912; 1920; 1924; 1928; 1932; 1936; 1948; 1952; 1956; 1960; 1964; 1968; 1972; 1976; 1980; 1984; 1988; 1992; 1996; 2000; 2004; 2008; 2012; 2016; 2020; 2024

Other related appearances
- 1906 Intercalated Games

Norway was represented at the 1976 Summer Olympics in Montreal by the Norwegian Olympic Committee and Confederation of Sports. 66 competitors, 60 men and 6 women, took part in 44 events in 11 sports.

== Medalists ==
=== Gold ===
- Alf Hansen and Frank Hansen — Rowing, Men's double sculls

=== Silver ===
- Finn Tveter, Rolf Andreassen, Arne Bergodd, and Ole Nafstad — Rowing, Men's coxless four

== Archery ==
In the second appearance by the nation in the archery competition at the Olympics, Norway was represented by only one man. A veteran of the 1972 Summer Olympics, Jan Erik Humlekjær shot two points less than his performance of four years before. Nevertheless, he moved up eight places in the ranking.

Men's Individual Competition:

- Jan Erik Humlekjær — 2337 points (→ 24th place)

== Athletics ==
Men's 1500 metres

- Lars Martin Kaupang

- Heat — 3:44.59 min (→ did not advance)

Men's 5.000 metres

- Knut Børø

- Heat — did not start (→ did not advance, no ranking)

- Knut Kvalheim

- Heat — 13:20.60 min
- Final — 13:30.33 min (→ 9th place)

Men's 10.000 metres

- Knut Børø

- Heat — 28:23.07 min (→ advanced to the final)
- Final — did not finish (→ no ranking)

Men's High Jump

- Terje Totland

- Qualification — 2.16 m
- Final — 2.18m (→ 9th place)

- Leif Roar Falkum

- Qualification — 2.16 m
- Final — 2.10m (→ 14th place)

Men's Discus Throw

- Knut Hjeltnes

- Qualification — 61.30 m
- Final — 63.06 m (→ 7th place)

Men's Javelin Throw

- Terje Thorslund

- Qualification — 82.52 m
- Final — 78.24 m (→ 11th place)

- Bjørn Grimnes

- Qualification — 80.32 m
- Final — 74.88 m (→ 14th place)

Women's 1500 metres

- Grete Waitz

- Heat — 4:07.20 min
- Semi final — 4:04.80 min (→ did not advance)

Women's High Jump

- Astrid Tveit

- Qualification — 1.70 m (→ did not advance)

== Cycling ==
Eight cyclists represented Norway in 1976.

Individual road race

- Thorleif Andresen — 4:49:01 (→ 38th place)
- Geir Digerud — 5:04:42 (→ 55th place)
- Pål Henning Hansen — did not finish (→ no ranking)
- Stein Bråthen — did not finish (→ no ranking)

Team time trial

- Stein Bråthen
- Geir Digerud
- Arne Klavenes
- Magne Orre

1000m time trial

- Harald Bundli — 1:08.093 (→ 7th place)

Individual pursuit

- Jan Georg Iversen — 7th place

== Fencing ==
Five fencers, all men, represented Norway in 1976.

Men's épée

- Nils Koppang
- Jeppe Normann
- Ole Mørch

Men's team épée

- Nils Koppang, Jeppe Normann, Kjell Otto Moe, Bård Vonen, Ole Mørch

== Rowing ==
Men's coxless fours

- Ole Nafstad
- Arne Bergodd
- Finn Tveter
- Rolf Andreassen

Men's coxed fours

- Tom Amundsen
- Kjell Sverre Johansen
- Sverre Norberg
- Rune Dahl
- Alf Torp

Women's single sculls

- Tone Pahle

Women's double sculls

- Solfrid Johansen
- Ingun Brechan

== Sailing ==
Mixed One Person Dinghy

- Tom Skjønberg

Mixed Two Person Dinghy

- Hans Petter Jensen
- Morten Jensen

Mixed Three Person Keelboat

- Kim Torkildsen
- Morten Rieker
- Peder Lunde Jr.

== Shooting ==
Mixed Free Pistol, 50 metres

- John Rødseth

Mixed Small-Bore Rifle, Three Positions, 50 metres

- Helge Anshushaug
- Terje Melbye Hansen

Mixed Small-Bore Rifle, Prone, 50 metres

- Terje Melbye Hansen
- Helge Anshushaug

Mixed Running Target, 50 metres

- Kenneth Skoglund
