= Miguel Ruiz =

Miguel Ruiz may refer to:

- Miguel Ruiz (businessman) (1856–1912), Puerto Rican coffee industrialist
- Don Miguel Ruiz (born 1952), Mexican author
- Miguel Ruiz (rower) (born 1953), Mexican Olympic rower
- Miguel Ruiz (rugby union) (born 1975), Argentine rugby union footballer
- Miguel Ruiz (basketball) (born 1990), Venezuelan basketball player

== See also ==
- Miguel Ángel Ruiz (disambiguation)
