= Andreas Decker =

German rower

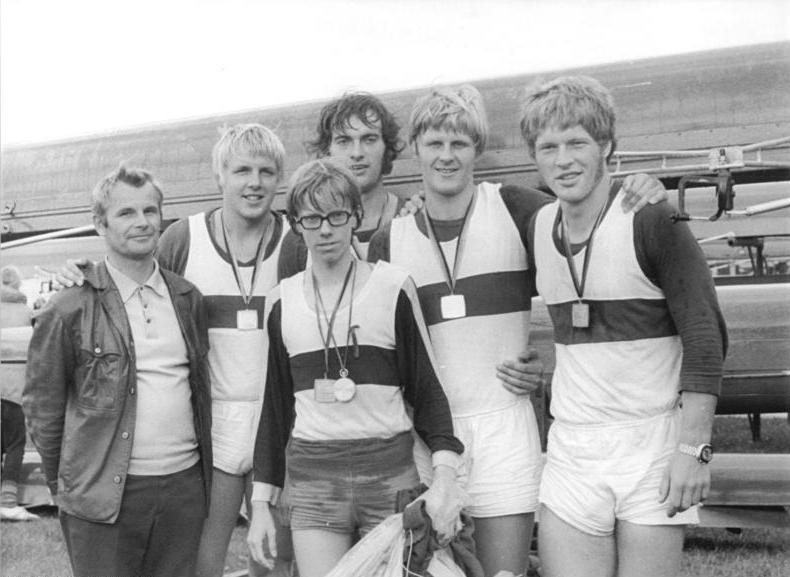
- After the national championship in Berlin 1974 from the left: Coach Jörg Weissig, Siegfried Brietzke, Andreas Decker, Stefan Semmler, Wolfgang Mager, and in the front coxwain Lehmann

Personal information
- Born: 19 August 1952 (age 73) Zwickau, East Germany
Medal record
Men's rowing
Representing East Germany
Olympic Games
Gold medal – first place	1976 Montreal	Coxless four
Gold medal – first place	1980 Moscow	Coxless four
World Rowing Championships
Gold medal – first place	1974 Lucerne	Coxless four
Gold medal – first place	1975 Nottingham	Coxless four
Gold medal – first place	1977 Amsterdam	Coxless four
Silver medal – second place	1978 Cambridge	Coxless four
Gold medal – first place	1979 Bled	Coxless four
European Rowing Championships
Gold medal – first place	1973 Moscow	Eight

Andreas Decker (born 19 August 1952) is a German rower who competed for East Germany in the 1976 Summer Olympics and in the 1980 Summer Olympics.

He was born in Zwickau. In 1976 he won the gold medal as crew member of the East German boat in the coxless fours competition. Four years later he won his second gold medal with the East German boat in the coxless four event.
