= Reon =

Reon is a given name. Notable people with the name include:

- Reon Cuffy (born 1999), Dominican footballer
- Reon Kadena (born 1986), Japanese glamour model and actress
- Reon King (born 1975), Guyanese former cricketer
- Reon Moore (born 1996), Trinidadian footballer
- Reon Nozawa (born 2003), Japanese footballer
- Reon Yamahara (born 1999), Japanese footballer
- Reon Yuzuki (born 1979), Japanese actress
- Reon Grant (born 2008), Brazilian model

== See also ==
- Rion (disambiguation)
