= Schola Castra Nova Equitum Singularium =

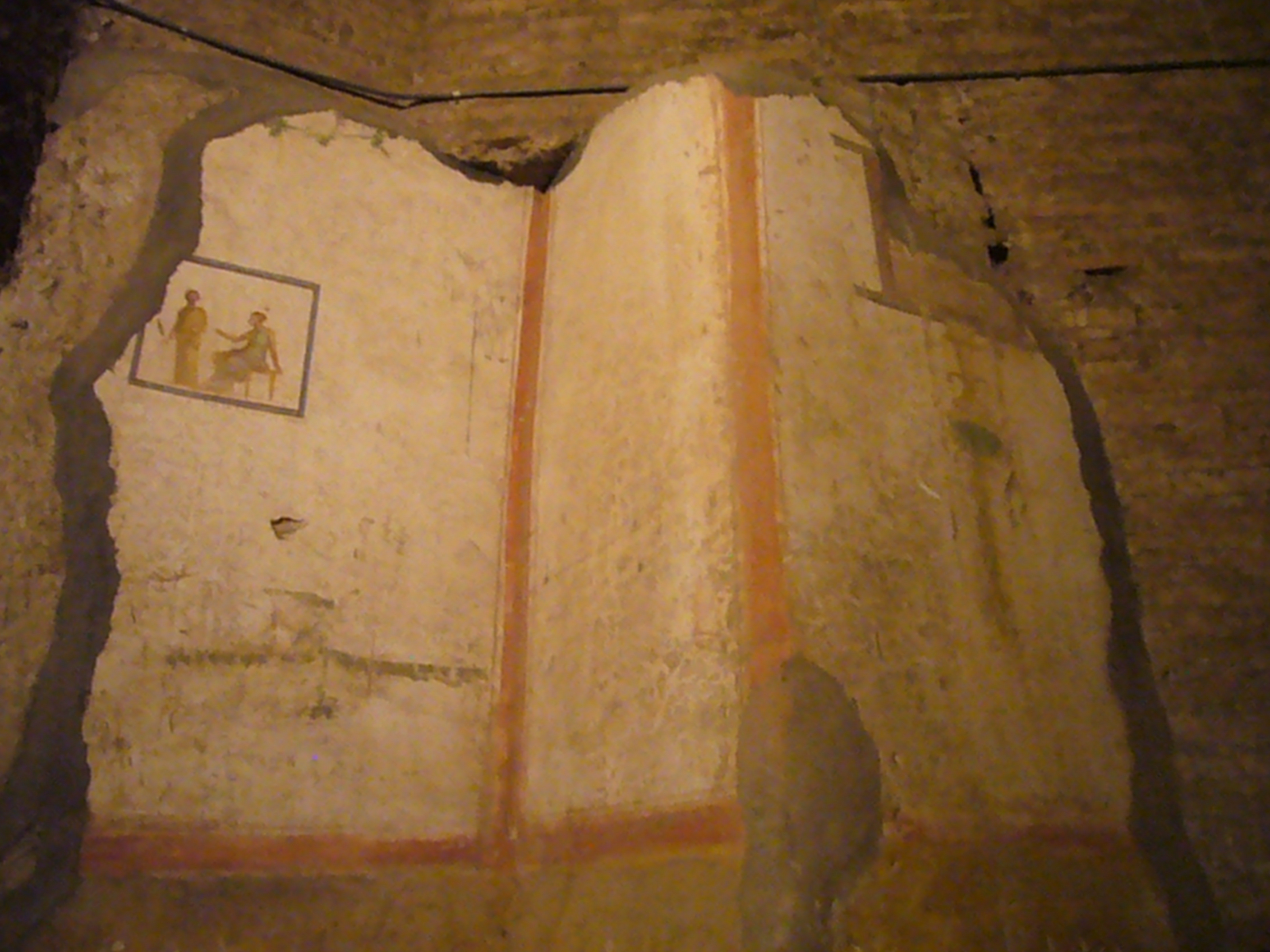
Laterano scavi - affreschi decorativi e murature di fondazione 1190336

The Schola of the Castra Nova Equitum Singularium was a meeting room/office of the curatores from the mounted bodyguard of the Emperor found within the remains of the headquarters of the Castra Nova ('New Camp') beneath the Basilica San Giovanni in Laterano.

== Excavations ==
Archaeological excavations beneath San Giovanni in Laterano in 1934–1938 uncovered part of the principia of the castra nova (new fort) of the Equites singulares Augusti. The building was square in shape and was fronted by a portico on the north side, creating a monumental façade that lead directly into the central courtyard. A rear range with the aedes at its centre occupied the southern end and short wings of two or three rooms formed the east and west sides. The room forming the northern end of the east wing could be identified as the schola curatorum by the inscription found in situ within, recording the consecration of the schola on January 1 AD 197. The inscription was incised on an inverted ionic capital, found lying beside a column of African granite that rose above ground level by 75 cm, with a foundation depth of 48 cm. That the capital and column were connected seems certain, particularly as the column supports the capital perfectly.

On the plan prepared by Gismondi and published by Colini the room where the inscription was found contains the letter ε (p344 Fig 284), but this is only a label for the room and there is no indication as to where within it the inscription was actually discovered. Spinola, however argued that the location of the monument within this room was coincidental, being simply a side room to which outdated and unwanted inscriptions could be relegated. Instead he suggested that the inscription originally came from the aedes on the grounds that a dedication to the imperial cult would be more appropriately housed there. This hypothesis is not plausible, as dedications by military collegia to the domus divina occur in rooms throughout the principia at Lambaesis. This shows that monuments set up by individual associations were usually located in their own private space, rather than in a communal area.

The room measured 7 meters long and 4.60 meters wide, with a doorway slightly off-centre in the west wall, 1.80 meters wide. There is no evidence for any other structural features or architectural embellishments to the room and the niche reported by Speidel is a result of his misunderstanding of Josi's report. Josi in describing the door into the schola states that it is "è posta quasi al centro della parete che guarda l’abside." This does not mean, as Speidel is believed to have translated it, that the doorway was in the wall opposite an apse. Rather, Josi is referring to the apse of the cathedral above, as throughout his report he relates his discoveries to the features of the Basilica San Giovanni, which were at the time clearly visible to him. Following this interpretation the doorway is indeed in the wall that faced the apse of the basilica, so that his observation was not referring to the schola at all. Certainly it is difficult to identify any structural feature altering the rectangular aspect of the room in any of the excavation photographs or from visiting the remains today.

Part of the wall decoration survives as plaster painted dark red with a geometric pattern marked out in thin white lines. The frescoes are badly damaged and survive only to about two meters in height, with the lower footings missing and the upper destruction level roughly even, though irregular. The only discernible decorative element appears as three white lines rising vertically, with the outer two lines then turning at opposing right angles to form the horizontal upper edge of a rectangular panel. The fresco, along with the remains of the principia itself, were destroyed only a few feet above the floor level. The dating of the fresco is also uncertain, though it reflects a general scheme visible in the other rooms, of geometric patterns in white picked out on a dark red background.

There is no evidence for the floor and it must have consisted of materials that were able to be recycled prior to its demolition. The column and capital may have acted as an altar, comparable to an example of an ionic capital employed in such a way at the mithraeum of the domus on Via Giovanni Lanza. Speidel suggested it could have once supported a statue of Minerva, more likely Minerva Augusta as the dedication to the goddess contained in the text suggests. Spinola argues against this view, noting that there is no sign on the surface of the capital of dowel-holes by which the statue could be securely attached. These, however, may have been unnecessary as the statue would have been placed on a firm broad base in safe location. In general, the schola of the curatores indicates that a functional room could easily be adapted to the purposes of a schola without causing any radical change in its nature, nor, it follows, does it need to identify itself as a schola by adopting any obvious structural indications of this role.
