= Piantedosi =

Piantedosi is a surname. Notable people with the surname include:

- Gary Piantedosi (1954–2026), American rower
- Matteo Piantedosi (born 1963), Italian civil servant and politician

== See also ==
- Piantadosi, surname
