= Siegfried Brietzke =

German rower

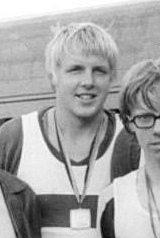
- Brietzke in 1974

Personal information
- Born: 12 June 1952 (age 74) Rostock, East Germany
- Height: 192 cm (6 ft 4 in)
- Weight: 90 kg (198 lb)

Sport
- Sport: Rowing
- Club: SC DHfK Leipzig
Medal record
Representing East Germany
Olympic Games
| Gold medal – first place | 1972 Munich | Coxless pair |
| Gold medal – first place | 1976 Montreal | Coxless four |
| Gold medal – first place | 1980 Moscow | Coxless four |
World Rowing Championships
| Gold medal – first place | 1974 Lucerne | Coxless four |
| Gold medal – first place | 1975 Nottingham | Coxless four |
| Gold medal – first place | 1977 Amsterdam | Coxless four |
| Silver medal – second place | 1978 Cambridge | Coxless four |
| Gold medal – first place | 1979 Bled | Coxless four |
World Rowing Junior Championships
| Gold medal – first place | 1970 Ioannina | Coxed pair |

Siegfried Brietzke (born 12 June 1952) is a German rower. He competed for East Germany, first in coxless pairs, together with Wolfgang Mager, and then in coxless fours. In these events he won Olympic gold medals in 1972, 1976 and 1980, as well as four world championships in 1974–1979.

== Rowing career ==
Brietzke responded to a television programme screened at Christmas 1967 where tall boys were sought as rowers, and he joined SC DHfK Leipzig in response. After training for just three years, he won a gold medal with Wolfgang Mager and cox Werner Lehmann at the 1970 World Rowing Junior Championships in Ioannina in the coxed pair. At the 1971 East German national championships, he came second in the coxless four.

At the 1972 Summer Olympics, Brietzke and his partner Mager won the gold medal in the coxless pair event. Mager and Brietzke won the East German national championship in the coxless pair in 1973, but a few weeks later at the 1973 European Rowing Championships in Moscow they came fourth only in this boat class.

At the 1974 East German national championships, Brietzke, Mager, Stefan Semmler, and Andreas Decker became champions in two boat classes: in the coxless four, and in the coxed four assisted by coxswain Matthias Sommer. They went to the 1974 World Rowing Championships in Lucerne as a coxless four and won gold. Brietzke, Mager, Semmler, and Decker won the national coxless four event every year until 1979. The four won the 1975 World Rowing Championships in Nottingham, the 1976 Summer Olympics in Montreal, the 1977 World Rowing Championships in Amsterdam, but were beaten to second place by the team from the Soviet Union at the 1978 World Rowing Championships in Cambridge, New Zealand. They won gold again at the 1979 World Rowing Championships in Bled, and won a further Olympic gold in 1980 in Moscow, but with Jürgen Thiele having replaced Wolfgang Mager. After the Moscow Olympics, Brietzke was the only sports person that year to be awarded the Patriotic Order of Merit in gold with honour clasp, the highest sports award of the GDR.

== Post-rowing life ==
Brietzke is married and has a son, born in 1974.

In 2013, it was revealed that Brietzke was a member of the Stasi, the state security service of the German Democratic Republic. Under the codename "Charlie", his role was to control other athletes and report those with "deviant thinking".
