= Oanță =

Oanță or Oantă is a Romanian surname. Notable people with the surname include:

- Ilie Oanță (born 1950), Romanian rower
- Iolanda Oanță (born 1965), Romanian track and field athlete
