= Spinello =

Spinello is both a given name and a surname.

Notable people with the given name include:

- Spinello Aretino (c. 1350 – c. 1410), Italian painter

Notable people with the surname include:

- Guglielmo Spinello (born 1941), Italian boxer
- Natale Spinello (born 1947), Italian rower
