= Croce =

Croce may refer to:

- Croce (family), a noble family in the Republic of Ragusa
- Croce (genus), a genus of lacewings in the family Nemopteridae
- Croce (surname)
- Croce, Haute-Corse, a municipality in the Haute-Corse department, France
- Croce, a parish of Menaggio in the Province of Como, Italy
- Croce, a frazione of Musile di Piave, in the Metropolitan City of Venice

== See also ==
- Santa Croce (disambiguation)
