= Jordaens (disambiguation) =

Jordaens primarily refers to the Flemish artist Jacob Jordaens (1593–1678).

Jordaens may also refer to:

- Wilhelm Jordaens (died 1372), Augustinian mystical writer and translator
- Hans Jordaens (1555–1630), Flemish Baroque painter
- Hans III Jordaens (1590–1643), Flemish Baroque painter
- Hans IV Jordaens (1616–1680), Dutch Golden Age painter
- Anna Jordaens (1927–1996), Belgian gymnast
- Jozef Jordaens (born 1950), Belgian rower
