= Croce (surname) =

Croce is an Italian surname meaning literally "cross". Notable people with the surname include:

- A. J. Croce (born 1971), American singer-songwriter
- Alberto Croce (born 1944), Italian professional golfer
- Alessandro Croce (1650–1704), Italian prelate
- Andrea Giuseppe Croce (1914–1986), Italian businessman
- Antonio Croce (born 1986) Italian footballer
- Arlene Croce (1934–2024), American dance critic
- Baldassare Croce (1558–1628), Italian painter
- Benedetto Croce (1866–1952), Italian philosopher and critic
- Carlo Croce (born 1945), Italian yacht racer
- Carlo M. Croce (born 1944), Italian-American oncologist
- Daniele Croce (born 1982), Italian footballer
- Fabiano Santacroce (born 1986), Italian Brazilian association football player
- Francesco Croce (1696–1773), Italian baroque architect
- Fulvio Croce (1901–1977), Italian lawyer
- Giovanni Croce (1557–1609), Italian composer
- Giovanni Andrea Croce (died 1595), Italian prelate
- Giulio Cesare Croce (1550–1609), Italian playwright
- Ingrid Croce (born 1947), American singer-songwriter and wife of Jim
- Ireneo della Croce (1625–1713), Italian preacher
- Jim Croce (1943–1973), American singer-songwriter
- Luigi Croce (born 1940), Italian yacht racer
- Marcos Croce (1894–1978), Argentine footballer
- Maria Eufrasia della Croce (1597–1676), Italian nun and painter
- Mary Keating Croce (1928–2016), American politician
- Nicolás Emanuel Croce (born 1985), Argentine footballer
- Onofrio de Santa Croce (died 1471), Italian cardinal
- Paola Croce (born 1978), Italian volleyball player
- Pat Croce (born 1954), Italian-American entrepreneur
- Pellegrino Croce (born 1955), Italian rower
- Stefania Croce (born 1970), Italian professional golfer

== See also ==
- Croci (surname)
