= Jim Moroney =

Jim or James Moroney may refer to:

- Jim Moroney (baseball) (1883–1929), American baseball player
- Jim Moroney (public servant) (1898–1965), Australian public servant and policy-maker
- James Moroney (born 1953), American rower
