= Felix Flores =

Puerto Rican boxer

Personal information
- Born: Felix Flores Serrano; January 29, 1976 (age 50) Juana Díaz, Puerto Rico
- Height: 5 ft 7 in (170 cm)
- Weight: Welterweight

Boxing career
- Reach: 70 in (178 cm)
- Stance: Orthodox

Boxing record
- Total fights: 29
- Wins: 22
- Win by KO: 16
- Losses: 7

Felix Flores (born January 29, 1976, in Juana Díaz, Puerto Rico) is a professional boxer.

Flores, who fights out of Puerto Rico, has been featured numerous times on Telemundo. In February 2005, Flores got his first loss on March 30, 1996, vs. Juan Carlos Suarez (7–0–1) in Miami Beach losing by Knockout in the 3rd round.

His record is 22–7 with 16 KOs in 29 bouts.

Achievements
Preceded by Miguel Angel Ruiz	NABA Light Welterweight Title; March 3, 2000–N/A	Succeeded by N/A
Preceded by Isander Lacen	WBO NABO Light Welterweight Title; December 15, 2000–N/A	Succeeded by N/A
Preceded by N/A; Vacated	WBO Latino Welterweight Title; May 13, 2005–June 2, 2006	Succeeded by Cosme Rivera

== See also ==
- Boxing record for Felix Flores from BoxRec (registration required)
