= Hugh Stevenson =

Hugh Stevenson may refer to:

- Hugh Stevenson (footballer), Scottish footballer
- Hugh Stevenson (rower), American rower
- Hugh Stevenson (investment banker), British businessman
- Hugh Allan Stevenson, physician and politician in Ontario, Canada
