= Tony Brooks =

Tony Brooks may refer to:

- Anthony Brooks (1922–2007), also known as Tony Brooks, British undercover agent in World War II
- Tony Brooks (racing driver) (1932–2022), British Formula One driver
- Tony Brooks (footballer) (born 1944), English footballer, see List of Bury F.C. players (1–24 appearances)
- Tony Brooks (rower) (born 1950), American Olympic rower
- Tony Brooks (American football) (born 1969), American football running back
- Tony Brooks-James (born 1994), American football running back
- Anthony Michael Brooks, American speed cuber

== See also ==
- Tony Brook, New Zealand rower
