= Matti Salminen (rower) =

Finnish rower

Personal information
- Nationality: Finnish
- Born: 13 November 1947 (age 77); Turku, Finland

Sport
- Sport: Rowing

Matti Salminen (born 13 November 1947) is a Finnish rower. He competed in the men's coxless four event at the 1976 Summer Olympics.
