= Grant McAuley =

New Zealand rower

Personal information
- Nationality: New Zealand
- Born: Grant R. F. McAuley; 6 July 1949 (age 76) Auckland, New Zealand
- Height: 181 cm (5 ft 11 in)
- Weight: 84 kg (185 lb)
Medal record
Men's rowing
Representing New Zealand
World Rowing Championships
| Bronze medal – third place | 1975 Nottingham | Eight |
| Silver medal – second place | 1979 Bled | Eight |

Grant R. F. McAuley (born 6 July 1949) is a New Zealand rower.

McAuley was born in 1949 in Auckland, New Zealand. He rowed with the eight in the 1975 World Rowing Championships in Nottingham, Great Britain, and won a bronze medal. He represented New Zealand at the 1976 Summer Olympics in the coxless four in a team with Bob Murphy, David Lindstrom, and Des Lock, narrowly beaten by the team from the Soviet Union to fourth place. He is listed as New Zealand Olympian athlete number 358 by the New Zealand Olympic Committee. He competed in the 1978 World Rowing Championships in the double sculls with John White and they came sixth in the final. At the 1979 World Rowing Championships held at Bled in Slovenia, Yugoslavia, he won a silver medal with the eight. McAuley won the Bay of Plenty Sportsman of the Year award in 1979.
