= Ruud Stokvis =

Dutch rower (born 1943)

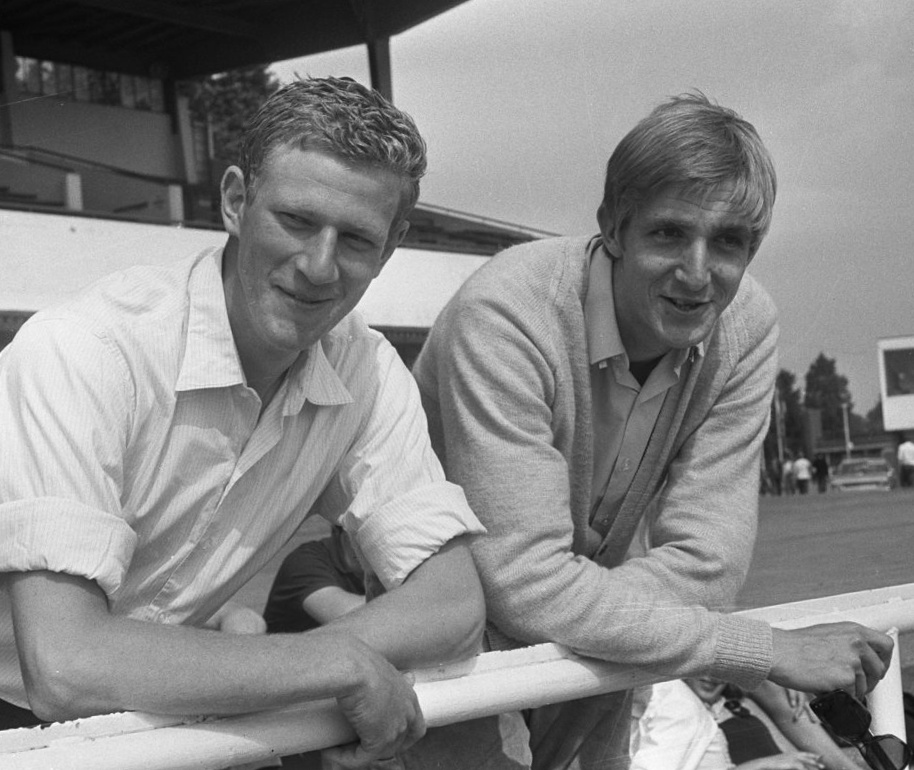
- Ruud Stokvis (left) and Roel Luynenburg in 1968

Personal information
- Born: 24 April 1943 (age 83) Amsterdam, the Netherlands
- Height: 1.90 m (6 ft 3 in)
- Weight: 87 kg (192 lb)

Sport
- Sport: Rowing
- Club: Nereus, Amsterdam
Medal record
Representing the Netherlands
Olympic Games
Bronze medal – third place	1972 Munich	Coxless pair
World Rowing Championships
Bronze medal – third place	1966 Bled	Coxless four

Rudolf "Ruud" Stokvis (born 24 April 1943) is a retired rower from the Netherlands, who represented his native country twice at the Summer Olympics, starting in 1968. Four years later, he won a bronze medal in the coxless pairs alongside Roel Luynenburg. Stokvis also won a bronze medal in the coxless fours at the 1966 World Rowing Championships.

In 1978, Stokvis defended a PhD thesis on the ideological and organizational development of modern sports. He was then teaching sociology at the University of Amsterdam, including sports-related topics. He was also involved in research activities and published several books:

- 125 jaar Koninklĳke Nederlandsche Studenten Roeibond (2008, ISBN 9789090228532)
- Fitter, harder & mooier : de onweerstaanbare opkomst van de fitnesscultuur (Amsterdam/Antwerpen, 2008, ISBN 9789029565912)
- Concurrentie en beschaving : ondernemingen en het commercieel beschavingsproces (Amsterdam, 1999, ISBN 9053524614)
- Sport, publiek en de media (Amsterdam, 2003, ISBN 9052600465)
- De sportwereld : een sociologische inleiding (Alphen aan den Rijn/Brussel, 1989, ISBN 9014038674)
- Ondernemers en industriële verhoudingen : een onderneming in regionaal verband (1945–1985) (Assen, 1989, ISBN 9023224760)
- Strijd over sport : organisatorische en ideologische ontwikkelingen (Deventer, 1979, ISBN 9060015681)
