= Hans Fortmüller =

Austrian rower

Personal information
- Nationality: Austrian
- Born: 24 April 1949 (age 75)

Sport
- Sport: Rowing

Hans Fortmüller (born 24 April 1949) is an Austrian rower. He competed in the men's coxless pair event at the 1972 Summer Olympics.
