= Erik Erichsen =

Norwegian rower

Personal information
- Nationality: Norwegian
- Born: 15 July 1950 (age 74); Oslo, Norway

Sport
- Sport: Rowing

Erik Erichsen (born 15 July 1950) is a Norwegian rower. He competed in the men's coxless pair event at the 1972 Summer Olympics.
