= Carlos Denari =

Argentine rower

Personal information
- Nationality: Argentine
- Born: 29 July 1954 (age 71)

Sport
- Sport: Rowing

Carlos Denari (born 29 July 1954) is an Argentine rower. He competed in the men's coxless four event at the 1976 Summer Olympics.
