= Gabriel Konertz =

German rower

Personal information
- Nationality: German
- Born: 26 August 1954; Bonn, Germany
- Died: 28 February 2017 (aged 62)

Sport
- Sport: Rowing

Gabriel Konertz (26 August 1954 – 28 February 2017) was a German rower. He competed in the men's coxless four event at the 1976 Summer Olympics.
