= Erwin Haas =

German rower

Personal information
- Nationality: German
- Born: 20 July 1945 (age 79); Offenbach am Main, Germany

Sport
- Sport: Rowing

Erwin Haas (born 20 July 1945) is a German rower. He competed in the men's coxless pair event at the 1972 Summer Olympics.
