= Jorma Hurme =

Finnish rower

Personal information
- Nationality: Finnish
- Born: 17 September 1946 (age 78)

Sport
- Sport: Rowing

Jorma Hurme (born 17 September 1946) is a Finnish rower. He competed in the men's coxless four event at the 1976 Summer Olympics.
