= Bob Murphy (rower) =

New Zealand rower (born 1950)

Personal information
- Nationality: New Zealand
- Born: Robert Kevin Murphy; 2 March 1950 (age 75) Auckland, New Zealand
- Height: 183 cm (6 ft 0 in)
- Weight: 87 kg (192 lb)

Robert Kevin Murphy (born 2 March 1950) is a New Zealand rower.

Murphy was born in 1950 in Auckland, New Zealand. He represented New Zealand at the 1976 Summer Olympics in the coxless four in a team with David Lindstrom, Grant McAuley, and Des Lock, narrowly beaten by the team from the Soviet Union to fourth place. He is listed as New Zealand Olympian athlete number 361 by the New Zealand Olympic Committee. He is a member of the Whakatane Rowing Club and was the club's captain for the 1985–86 rowing season.
