= Ernest Gal =

Romanian rower

Personal information
- Nationality: Romanian
- Born: 19 July 1950 (age 74); Gălăţeni, Romania

Sport
- Sport: Rowing

Ernest Gal (born 19 July 1950) is a Romanian rower. He competed in the men's coxless four event at the 1976 Summer Olympics.
