= Juan Tuma =

Argentine rower

Personal information
- Nationality: Argentine
- Born: 22 March 1953 (age 72)

Sport
- Sport: Rowing

Juan Tuma (born 22 March 1953) is an Argentine rower. He competed in the men's coxless four event at the 1976 Summer Olympics.
