= Dick Lyon (rower) =

American rower (1939–2019)

Personal information
- Full name: Richard Avery Lyon
- Born: September 7, 1939 San Fernando, California, U.S.
- Died: July 8, 2019 (aged 79)
Medal record
Men's rowing
Representing United States
Olympic Games
Bronze medal – third place	1964 Tokyo	Coxless four

Richard Avery Lyon (September 7, 1939 – July 8, 2019) was an American rower who competed in the 1964 Summer Olympics and in the 1972 Summer Olympics. He was born in San Fernando, California. In 1964 he was a crew member of the American boat which won the bronze medal in the coxless fours event. Eight years later he finished ninth with his partner Larry Hough in the coxless pair competition.
