= Nikola Mardešić =

Croatian rower

Personal information
- Nationality: Croatian
- Born: 14 June 1945 (age 79); Split, Yugoslavia

Sport
- Sport: Rowing

Nikola Mardešić (born 14 June 1945) is a Croatian rower. He competed in the men's coxless pair event at the 1972 Summer Olympics.
