= Piantadosi =

Piantadosi is a surname. Notable people with the surname include:

- Al Piantadosi (1882–1955), American composer of popular music
- Arthur Piantadosi (1916–1994), American sound engineer
- Sam Piantadosi (1946–2010), Australian union official and politician

== See also ==
- Piantedosi, surname
