= Croci (surname) =

Croci is an Italian surname. Notable people with the surname include:

- Anna Croci (born 1972), Italian ice dancer
- Edoardo Croci (born 1961), Italian politician
- Emilio Croci-Torti (1922–2013), Swiss racing cyclist
- Giambattista Croci (born 1965), Italian retired rugby union player
- Gian Croci (born 1998), Argentine footballer
- Giorgio Croci (1893–1968), Italian sprinter
- Laurent Croci (born 1964), French football manager
- Mattia Croci-Torti (born 1982), Swiss football manager
- Max Croci (1968–2018), Italian director
- Thomas Croci (born 1972), American politician

== See also ==
- Croce (surname)
