= Raul Arnemann =

Estonian rower (born 1953)

Personal information
- Born: Raul Arnemann; 23 January 1953 (age 73) Pärnu, Estonia
- Height: 186 cm (6 ft 1 in)
- Weight: 82 kg (181 lb)

Sport
- Sport: Rowing
- Club: Soviet Army Moskva
Medal record
Men's rowing
Representing the Soviet Union
Olympic Games
| Bronze medal – third place | 1976 Montreal | Coxless four |
World Rowing Championships
| Silver medal – second place | 1974 Lucerne | Coxless four |
| Silver medal – second place | 1975 Nottingham | Coxless four |
| Silver medal – second place | 1977 Amsterdam | Eight |

Raul Arnemann (born 23 January 1953) is a retired Estonian rower who competed for the Soviet Union in the 1976 Summer Olympics.

Arnemann was born in Pärnu in 1953; it was located in the Soviet Union at that time and is today part of Estonia. In 1976 he was a crew member of the Soviet boat which won the bronze medal in the coxless four event.
