= Heinrich Fischer =

Swiss rower

Personal information
- Born: 12 January 1950 (age 76)
Medal record
Men's rowing
Representing Switzerland
Olympic Games
Silver medal – second place	1972 Munich	Coxless pair

Heinrich "Heini" Fischer (born 12 January 1950) is a Swiss rower who competed in the 1972 Summer Olympics.

In 1972 he and his partner Alfred Bachmann won the silver medal in the coxless pairs event.
