= Åke Fiskerstrand =

Norwegian rower

Personal information
- Nationality: Norwegian
- Born: 23 April 1948 (age 77) Ålesund, Norway

Sport
- Sport: Rowing

Åke Fiskerstrand (born 23 April 1948) is a Norwegian rower. He competed in the men's coxless pair event at the 1972 Summer Olympics.
