= Roel Luynenburg =

Dutch rower (1945–2023)

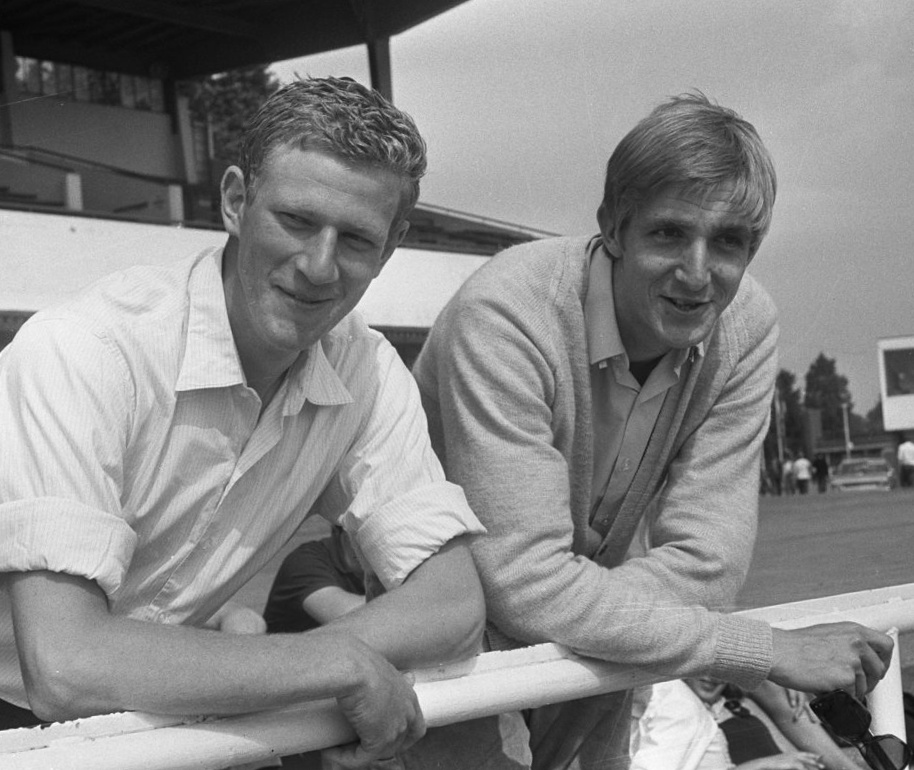
- Luynenburg (right) and Ruud Stokvis in 1968

Personal information
- Born: 23 May 1945 Haarlem, Netherlands
- Died: 6 November 2023 (aged 78) Amsterdam, Netherlands
- Height: 2.03 m (6 ft 8 in)
- Weight: 86 kg (190 lb)

Sport
- Sport: Rowing
- Club: Nereus, Amsterdam
Medal record
Representing the Netherlands
Olympic Games
| Bronze medal – third place | 1972 Munich | Coxless pair |
World Rowing Championships
| Bronze medal – third place | 1966 Bled | Coxless four |

Roelof "Roel" Johan Luynenburg (23 May 1945 – 6 November 2023) was a Dutch rower, who represented his native country twice at the Summer Olympics, starting in 1968. Four years later, he won the bronze medal in the coxless pairs alongside Ruud Stokvis. Luynenburg also won a bronze medal in the coxless fours at the 1966 World Rowing Championships.

Luynenburg died in November 2023, at the age of 78.
