= Jeremiah McCarthy =

British rower (born 1941)

Personal information
- Full name: Jeremiah Thomas McCarthy
- Nationality: British
- Born: 20 July 1941 (age 85) Surrey

Sport
- Sport: Rowing

Jeremiah Thomas McCarthy (born 20 July 1941) is a retired British rower who competed at the 1972 Summer Olympics.

== Rowing career ==
McCarthy participated in the 1970 World Rowing Championships competing in the doubles sculls event with Patrick Delafield where they finished in seventh place overall after winning the B final. He then won the coxless pairs with Matthew Cooper, rowing for a Vesta and Argosies composite, at the inaugural 1972 National Rowing Championships

Following the National Championships he was selected by Great Britain in the men's coxless pair event at the 1972 Olympics, where the same pair reached the semi-finals.
