= Erkka Mattila =

Finnish rower

Personal information
- Nationality: Finnish
- Born: 1 July 1946 (age 78)

Sport
- Sport: Rowing

Erkka Mattila (born 1 July 1946) is a Finnish rower. He competed in the men's coxless four event at the 1976 Summer Olympics.
