= Matteo Caglieris =

Italian rower

Personal information
- Nationality: Italian
- Born: 1 May 1955 (age 69); Milan, Italy

Sport
- Sport: Rowing

Matteo Caglieris (born 1 May 1955) is an Italian rower. He competed in the men's coxless four event at the 1976 Summer Olympics.
