= Andy McDonough =

Irish rower

Personal information
- Nationality: Irish
- Born: 11 June 1952 (age 72)

Sport
- Sport: Rowing

Andy McDonough (born 11 June 1952) is an Irish rower. He competed in the men's coxless four event at the 1976 Summer Olympics.
