= Anushavan Gassan-Dzhalalov =

Russian rower (born 1947)

Personal information
- Born: 23 April 1947 (age 79) Leninakan, Armenian SSR, Soviet Union

Sport
- Sport: Rowing
Medal record
Men's rowing
Representing the Soviet Union
Olympic Games
Bronze medal – third place	1976 Montreal	Coxless four
World Rowing Championships
Silver medal – second place	1974 Lucerne	Coxless four
Silver medal – second place	1975 Nottingham	Coxless four
European Rowing Championships
Bronze medal – third place	1971 Copenhagen	Coxed four

Anushavan Rafaelovich Gassan-Dzhalalov (Russian: Анушаван Рафаэлович Гасан-Джалалов, born 23 April 1947) is a Russian rower who competed for the Soviet Union in the 1976 Summer Olympics.

In 1976 he was a crew member of the Soviet boat which won the bronze medal in the coxless four event.
