= Jaye Renehan =

Irish rower (born 1951)

Personal information
- Nationality: Irish
- Born: 1 May 1951 (age 74)

Sport
- Sport: Rowing

Jaye Renehan (born 1 May 1951) is an Irish rower. He competed in the men's coxless four event at the 1976 Summer Olympics.
