= László Balogh (rower) =

Hungarian rower (born 1951)

Personal information
- Nationality: Hungarian
- Born: 14 April 1951 (age 73); Győr, Hungary

Sport
- Sport: Rowing

László Balogh (born 14 April 1951) is a Hungarian rower. He competed in the men's coxless pair event at the 1972 Summer Olympics.
