= Jorge Molina (rower) =

Argentine rower

Personal information
- Nationality: Argentine
- Born: 10 July 1956 (age 69)

Sport
- Sport: Rowing

Jorge Molina (born 10 July 1956) is an Argentine rower. He competed in the men's coxless four event at the 1976 Summer Olympics.
