= Pekka Pietilä =

Finnish rower

Personal information
- Nationality: Finnish
- Born: 1 January 1945 (age 80)

Sport
- Sport: Rowing

Pekka Pietilä (born 1 January 1945) is a Finnish rower. He competed in the men's coxless four event at the 1976 Summer Olympics.
