= Rumyan Khristov =

Bulgarian rower (born 1954)

Personal information
- Nationality: Bulgarian
- Born: 8 July 1954 (age 71)
- Height: 198 cm (6 ft 6 in)
- Weight: 98 kg (216 lb)

Sport
- Sport: Rowing

Rumyan Khristov (Bulgarian: Румян Христов; born 8 July 1954) is a Bulgarian rower.

Khristov was born in 1954. He competed in the men's coxless four event at the 1976 Summer Olympics. He competed in the 1979 World Rowing Championships in the men's eight and the team came tenth.
