= Alfred Bachmann =

Swiss rower

Fredy Bachmann
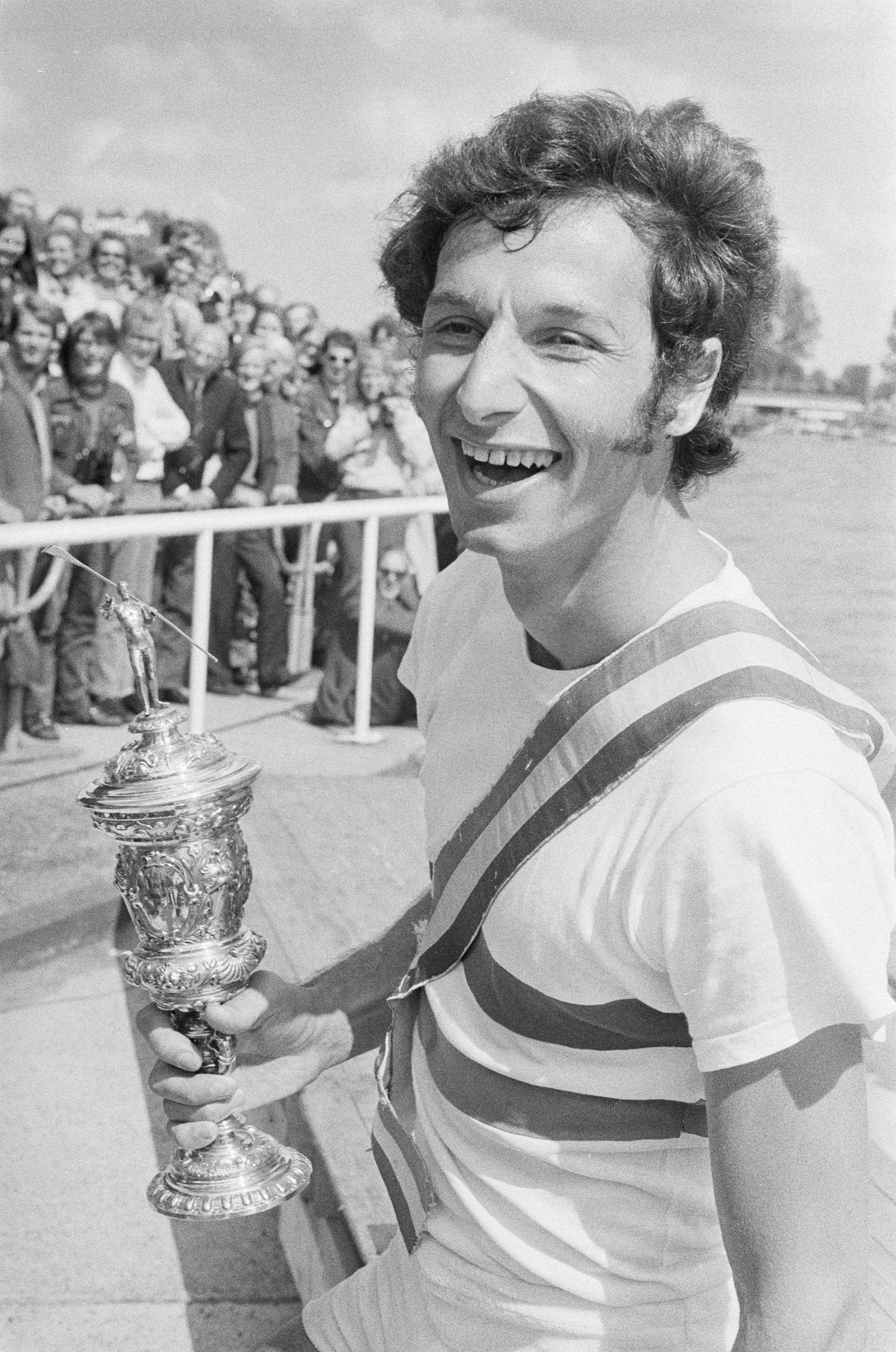
- Bachmann in 1971

Personal information
- Full name: Alfred Bachmann
- Born: 31 March 1945 (age 81)
- Height: 1.80 m (5 ft 11 in)
- Weight: 70 kg (154 lb)

Sport
- Sport: Rowing
- Club: See-Club Luzern, Luzern
Medal record
Representing Switzerland
Olympic Games
Silver medal – second place	1972 Munich	Coxless pair

Alfred "Fredy" Bachmann (born 31 March 1945) is a Swiss retired rower. With Heinrich Fischer, he won the silver medal in the coxless pairs event at the 1972 Summer Olympics.
