= Chris Stevens (rower) =

Australian rower

Personal information
- Full name: Christopher W Stevens
- Nationality: Australian
- Born: 12 February 1946 (age 80)
- Education: Shore

Sport
- Sport: Rowing
- Club: Colleagues Rowing Club; Sydney Rowing Club

Achievements and titles
- National finals: King's Cup 1966-67,70.

Chris Stevens (born 12 February 1946) is an Australian former national representative rower. He was three times a national champion in sweep-oared boats and once as a sculler. He competed in the men's coxless pair event at the 1972 Summer Olympics.

== Club and state rowing ==
Stevens' attended Sydney Church of England Grammar School where he learned to row. His senior club rowing was initially from the Colleagues Rowing Club, a new Sydney club of the time. His later club rowing was from the Sydney Rowing Club.

In 1966, 1967 and 1970 he was seated in New South Wales state eights which contested the Kings Cup at the Interstate Regatta within the Australian Rowing Championships. The 1967 New South Wales crew was victorious.

At the 1966 Australian Rowing Championships in a composite SRC/SUBC crew Stevens, Alf Duval, John Ranch, Peter Dickson, and cox Brian Thomas won the Australian coxed four title. In 1970 with Haberfield's Dick Reddel he won the national championship title in a double scull. At the 1972 Australian Rowing Championships Stevens was in the three two seat of a composite Drummoyne/Sydney/Haberfield four which took the men's coxed four national title, qualifying all crew members for the Australian Olympic squad, although ultimately Stevens would row in the coxed pair in Munich.

== International representative rowing ==
In 1966 he was selected at three in the Australian coxed four which competed at the 1966 World Rowing Championships in Bled, Yugoslavia.

In 1967 a limited Australian squad was selected to race at the European Rowing Championships. Stevens was selected at three in the Australian eight. The crew suffered greatly from equipment problems and boat delivery hold-ups and failures. Nonetheless they managed an overall sixth place finish.

In 1972 Stevens was in the bow seat of the Australian coxless pair which raced at the Munich Olympics. Rowing with Kim Mackney, the pair was eliminated in the repechage.
