= Iuliu Szöcs =

Romanian volleyball player (1937–1992)

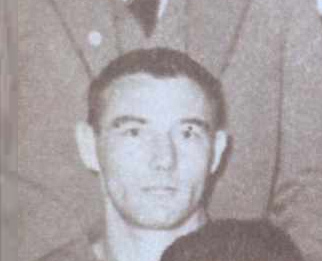
- Szöcs in 1963

Personal information
- Nationality: Romanian
- Born: 23 December 1937 Gălățeni, Romania
- Died: 29 August 1992 (aged 54) Galați, Romania

Sport
- Sport: Volleyball

Iuliu Szöcs (23 December 1937 – 29 August 1992) was a Romanian volleyball player. He competed in the men's tournament at the 1964 Summer Olympics.
