= Barry Maister =

New Zealand field hockey player

Barry Maister CNZM
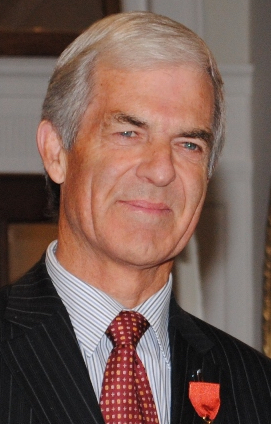
- Maister in 2012

Personal information
- Full name: Barry John Maister
- Born: 6 June 1948 (age 78) Christchurch, New Zealand
- Occupation: Schoolteacher
- Height: 1.87 m (6 ft 2 in)
- Weight: 80 kg (176 lb)
- Spouse: Cheryl Chamberlain (m. 1970)
- Relative: Selwyn Maister (brother)

Sport
- Country: New Zealand
- Sport: Field hockey
Medal record
Men's field hockey
Representing New Zealand
Olympic Games
Gold medal – first place	1976 Montreal	Team competition

Barry John Maister CNZM (born 6 June 1948) is a former New Zealand field hockey player, who was a member of the national team that won the gold medal at the 1976 Summer Olympics in Montreal. He is also a former member of the International Olympic Committee.

== Early life and family ==
Maister was born in Christchurch on 6 June 1948, and is the younger brother of Selwyn Maister. Barry Maister was educated at Christchurch Boys' High School, and then studied at the University of Canterbury, graduating BSc(Hons) in 1971, before completing a Diploma of Teaching at Christchurch Teachers' College.

In 1970, Maister married Cheryl Chamberlain, and the couple went on to have three children.

== Sporting career ==
During his hockey career he played 85 games for New Zealand as a centre forward, and represented his country at three Olympic Games—in 1968, 1972, and 1976—winning a gold medal with the New Zealand team in 1976. He later coached the New Zealand junior academy team, and served on the executive of the New Zealand Secondary Schools Sports Council.

Maister was an International Olympic Committee member from 2010 until 2018 when, according to protocol, he retired from the role after turning 70.

In 1991, the New Zealand hockey team that won the men's team gold medal at the 1976 Olympics was inducted into the New Zealand Sports Hall of Fame. In the 2012 New Year Honours, Maister was appointed an Officer of the New Zealand Order of Merit for services to sport. He was promoted to Companion of the New Zealand Order of Merit, for services to sport and the community, in the 2020 Queen's Birthday Honours.

== Teaching career ==
Maister taught at Christchurch Boys' High School for 16 years, including two years as deputy principal. He then worked as principal of Riccarton High School, before moving to St Andrew's College where he was rector.
