= Li Jong-un =

North Korean rower

Personal information
- Nationality: North Korean
- Born: 10 March 1936 (age 89)

Sport
- Sport: Rowing

Li Jong-un (born 10 March 1936) is a North Korean rower. He competed in the men's coxless pair event at the 1972 Summer Olympics.
