= Richard Ayling =

British rower

Personal information
- Full name: Richard John Ayling
- Nationality: British
- Born: 1 June 1952 Surrey, England
- Died: 1 November 2016 (aged 64) Kingston upon Thames, London
- Spouse: Astrid Ayling

Sport
- Sport: Rowing
- Club: Kingston Rowing Club

Richard John Ayling (1 June 1952 – 1 November 2016) was a British rower.

== Education ==
Ayling attended Dulwich College.

== Rowing career ==
He competed in the men's coxless four event at the 1976 Summer Olympics. He won the coxed pairs title rowing for the Kingston and Leander composite, with Mark Hayter, at the 1973 National Rowing Championships. Ayling was selected by Great Britain as part of the coxed four at the 1975 World Rowing Championships in Nottingham, the four just missed out on a medal finishing in fourth place in the A final.

In 1978, he took up coaching and was the coach of a crew that reached the final of the 1979 World Rowing Championships.

== Personal life ==
He married German international rower Astrid Hohl in 1976. He was the editor of a magazine called 'Rowing'.
