= Rion =

Rion may refer to:

== Surname ==
- Chanel Rion (born 1990), American broadcaster
- Francis Rion (born 1933), Belgian international football referee
- José Luis Rion (born 1952), Mexican rower
- Raicu Ionescu-Rion (1872–1895), Romanian literarist

== Given name ==
- Rion Amilcar Scott, American short story writer
- Rion Azuma (born 1996), Japanese singer
- Rion Brown (born 1991), American basketball player
- Rion Taki (born 1992), Japanese football player
- Rion Sumiyoshi (born 2003), Japanese figure skater

== Places ==
- Rion Hall, historic building
- Rion, South Carolina
- Rion-des-Landes
- Tone Rion, vocaloid

== Other uses ==
- Galerians: Rion, 2002 animated film

== See also ==
- Rio, Greece, also known as Rion
- Rioni River, also known as the Rion River
- Rions, commune in the Gironde department in Nouvelle-Aquitaine in southwestern France
- The Rions, Australian indie rock band
- Rio (disambiguation)
- Ríos (disambiguation)
- Ryan (disambiguation)
