= Petr Lakomý =

Czech rower

Personal information
- Nationality: Czech
- Born: 10 April 1951 (age 73); Olomouc, Czechoslovakia

Sport
- Sport: Rowing

Petr Lakomý (born 10 April 1951) is a Czech rower. He competed in the men's coxless pair event at the 1972 Summer Olympics.
