= Frank Dedecker =

Belgian rower

Personal information
- Nationality: Belgian
- Born: 9 August 1950 (age 74); Wilrijk, Belgium

Sport
- Sport: Rowing

Frank Dedecker (born 9 August 1950) is a Belgian rower. He competed in the men's coxless four event at the 1976 Summer Olympics.
