= David Lindstrom =

New Zealand rower (born 1948)

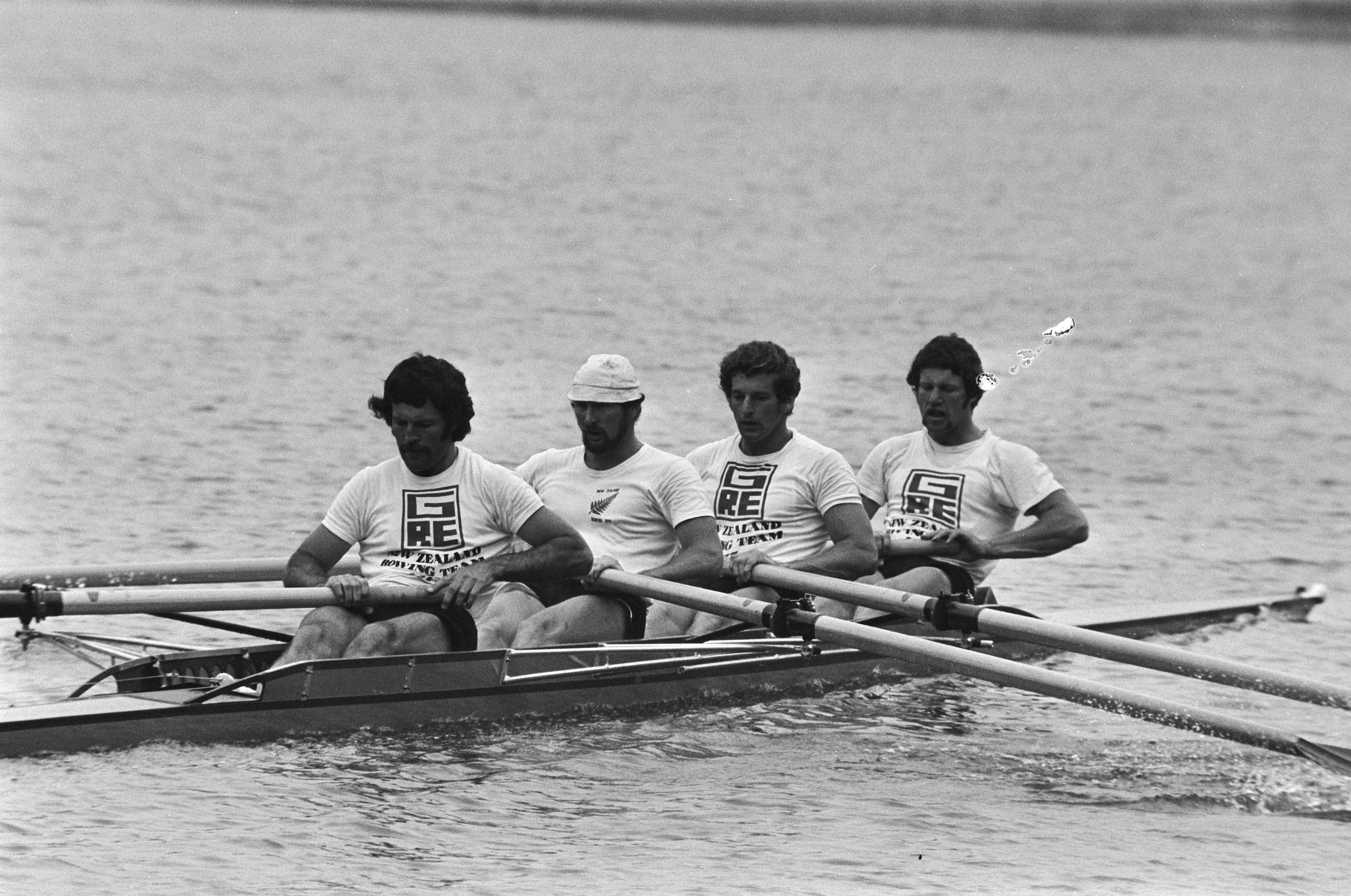
- 1977 New Zealand coxless four on the Bosbaan rowing lake in Amsterdam

Personal information
- Nationality: New Zealand
- Born: David Edward Lindstrom; 29 September 1948 (age 78) Christchurch, New Zealand
- Height: 185 cm (6 ft 1 in)
- Weight: 86 kg (190 lb)
Medal record
World Rowing Championships
| Silver medal – second place | 1977 Amsterdam | Four |
| Bronze medal – third place | 1978 Karapiro | Eight |

David Edward Lindstrom (born 29 September 1948) is a New Zealand rower.

== Early life ==
Lindstrom was born in 1948 in Christchurch, New Zealand. He received his education at St Bede's College (1962–1966) and then studied obtained a Bachelor of Commerce from the University of Canterbury (1967–1969). Ross Lindstrom is his cousin.

== Rowing ==
Lindstrom is a member of Avon Rowing Club. He represented New Zealand at the 1972 Summer Olympics in the coxed four, coming sixth in the event. He is listed as New Zealand Olympian athlete number 287 by the New Zealand Olympic Committee. He represented New Zealand at the 1976 Summer Olympics in the Coxless four in a team with Bob Murphy, Grant McAuley, and Des Lock, narrowly beaten by the team from the Soviet Union to fourth place. The 1977 World Rowing Championships saw Lindstrom win silver in the coxless four with Des Lock, Ivan Sutherland and Dave Rodger under new coach Harry Mahon. His last international success came in the 1978 World Rowing Championships at Lake Karapiro, when he won bronze with the New Zealand eight.

In 2006, Lindstrom was appointed to the panel of junior national selectors by Rowing New Zealand (RNZ), and he later became the convenor of this panel. He was a rowing coach at his old school, St Bede's College, for many years. Travelling to the 2015 Maadi Cup, two of his rowers were involved in a security breach at Auckland Airport. St Bede's headmaster stood the rowers down from the regatta and Lindstrom had a public fallout with the headmaster over the affair. It resulted in his resignation as rowing coach at St Bede's, but he was also dumped by RNZ as a junior selector. Lindstrom was coaching the Wanganui Collegiate School rowing club, and provided results to the school within his first year of coaching. Lindstrom was a head coach of the Christchurch Girls' High School rowing club for four seasons.
