= Brian Dick =

Canadian rower

Personal information
- Born: February 11, 1953 (age 72); St. Catharines, Ontario, Canada

Sport
- Sport: Rowing

Brian Dick (born February 11, 1953) is a Canadian rower. He competed in the men's coxless four event at the 1976 Summer Olympics.
