= Klaus Roloff =

German rower (born 1952)

Personal information
- Nationality: German
- Born: 20 March 1952 (age 73); Berlin, Germany

Sport
- Sport: Rowing

Klaus Roloff (born 20 March 1952) is a German rower. He competed in the men's coxless four event at the 1976 Summer Olympics.
