= Wolfgang Horak =

German rower

Personal information
- Nationality: German
- Born: 2 May 1952; Bonn, Germany
- Died: 6 April 2016 (aged 63)

Sport
- Sport: Rowing

Wolfgang Horak (2 May 1952 – 6 April 2016) was a German rower. He competed in the men's coxless four event at the 1976 Summer Olympics.
