= Johan Ghoos =

Belgian rower

Personal information
- Nationality: Belgian
- Born: 22 June 1956 (age 68)

Sport
- Sport: Rowing
- Club: Antwerpse Roeivereniging

Johan Ghoos (born 22 June 1956) is a Belgian rower. He competed in the men's coxless four event at the 1976 Summer Olympics.
