= Gismondi =

Gismondi is an Italian surname. Notable people with the surname include:

- Carlo Giuseppe Gismondi (1762–1824), Italian mineralogist who found and named the mineral Gismondine
- Italo Gismondi (1887–1974), Italian archaeologist
- Marcelo Gismondi, Argentine rower
- Michele Gismondi (1931–2013), Italian cyclist
- Paolo Gismondi (1612–1685), Italian Baroque painter
