= Vladimir Polyakov (rower) =

Soviet rower

Personal information
- Born: 9 July 1952 (age 72)
- Height: 186 cm (6 ft 1 in)
- Weight: 90 kg (198 lb)

Sport
- Sport: Rowing

Vladimir Polyakov (Russian: Владимир Евгеньевич Поляков; born 9 July 1952) is a Soviet rower. He competed at the 1972 Summer Olympics in Munich with the men's coxless pair where they came eighths.
