= Klaus Meyer (rower) =

German rower

Personal information
- Nationality: German
- Born: 21 January 1954 (age 71); Cologne, Germany

Sport
- Sport: Rowing

Klaus Meyer (born 21 January 1954) is a German rower. He competed in the men's coxless four event at the 1976 Summer Olympics.
