= Matthew Cooper (rower) =

British rower (1948–2015)

Personal information
- Full name: Matthew Michael Kenneth Cooper
- Nationality: British
- Born: 17 April 1948 Boston, Lincolnshire, England
- Died: 11 October 2015 (aged 67) Wahroonga, New South Wales, Australia

Sport
- Sport: Rowing

Matthew Michael Kenneth Cooper (17 April 1948 – 11 October 2015) was a British rower. Cooper competed at the 1968 Summer Olympics where he finished in tenth place in the men's eight. He won the coxless pairs with Jeremiah McCarthy, rowing for a Vesta and Argosies composite, at the inaugural 1972 National Rowing Championships before competing in the 1972 Summer Olympics, where the same pair reached the semi-finals of the men's coxless pair.
