= Bernhard Fölkel =

German rower

Personal information
- Nationality: German
- Born: 26 March 1953 (age 71); Cologne, Germany

Sport
- Sport: Rowing

Bernhard Fölkel (born 26 March 1953) is a German rower. He competed in the men's coxless four event at the 1976 Summer Olympics.
