= Enzo Lanzarini =

Italian rower

Personal information
- Nationality: Italian
- Born: 14 October 1953 (age 71); Loria, Italy

Sport
- Sport: Rowing

Enzo Lanzarini (born 14 October 1953) is an Italian rower. He competed in the men's coxless four event at the 1976 Summer Olympics.
