= Des Lock =

New Zealand rower (born 1949)

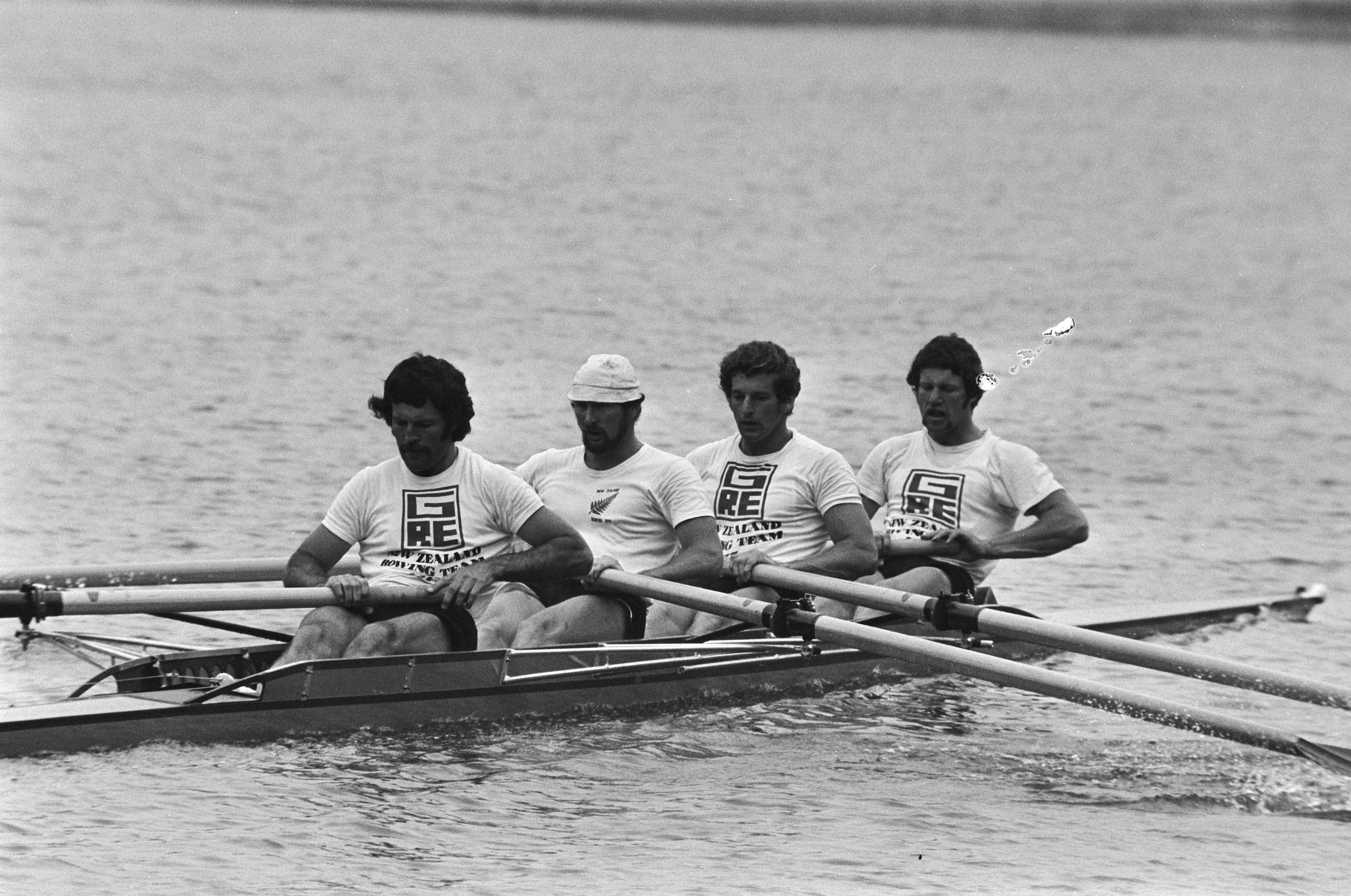
- 1977 New Zealand coxless four on the Bosbaan rowing lake in Amsterdam

Personal information
- Nationality: New Zealand
- Born: Desmond John Lock; 2 October 1949 (age 76) Batu Gajah, Malaysia
- Height: 183 cm (6 ft 0 in)
- Weight: 87 kg (192 lb)

Sport
- Club: Petone Rowing Club
Medal record
World Rowing Championships
Silver medal – second place	1977 Amsterdam	Four
Bronze medal – third place	1978 Karapiro	Eight

Desmond John Lock (born 2 October 1949) is a New Zealand rower.

Lock was born in 1949 in Batu Gajah, Malaysia. He was a member of Petone Rowing Club. He represented New Zealand at the 1976 Summer Olympics in the coxless four in a team with Bob Murphy, Grant McAuley, and David Lindstrom, narrowly beaten by the team from the Soviet Union to fourth place. He is listed as New Zealand Olympian athlete number 356 by the New Zealand Olympic Committee. The 1977 World Rowing Championships saw Lock win silver in the coxless four with Ivan Sutherland, David Lindstrom and Dave Rodger under new coach Harry Mahon.
