= Érico de Souza =

Brazilian rower

Personal information
- Born: 1 April 1947 (age 78); Garuva, Brazil

Sport
- Sport: Rowing

Érico de Souza (born 1 April 1947) is a Brazilian rower. He competed in the men's coxless pair event at the 1972 Summer Olympics.
