= Nikolay Kuznetsov (rower) =

Russian rower (born 1953)

Medal record

Men's rowing

Representing the Soviet Union

Olympic Games
Bronze medal – third place	1976 Montreal	Coxless four

World Rowing Championships
Silver medal – second place	1974 Lucerne	Coxless four
Silver medal – second place	1975 Nottingham	Coxless four

Nikolay Aleksandrovich Kuznetsov (Russian: Николай Александрович Кузнецов, born 1 July 1953) is a Russian rower who competed for the Soviet Union in the 1976 Summer Olympics. He was a crew member of the Soviet boat which won the bronze medal in the coxless fours event.
