= Păsăreni =

Păsăreni Backamadaras
- Commune
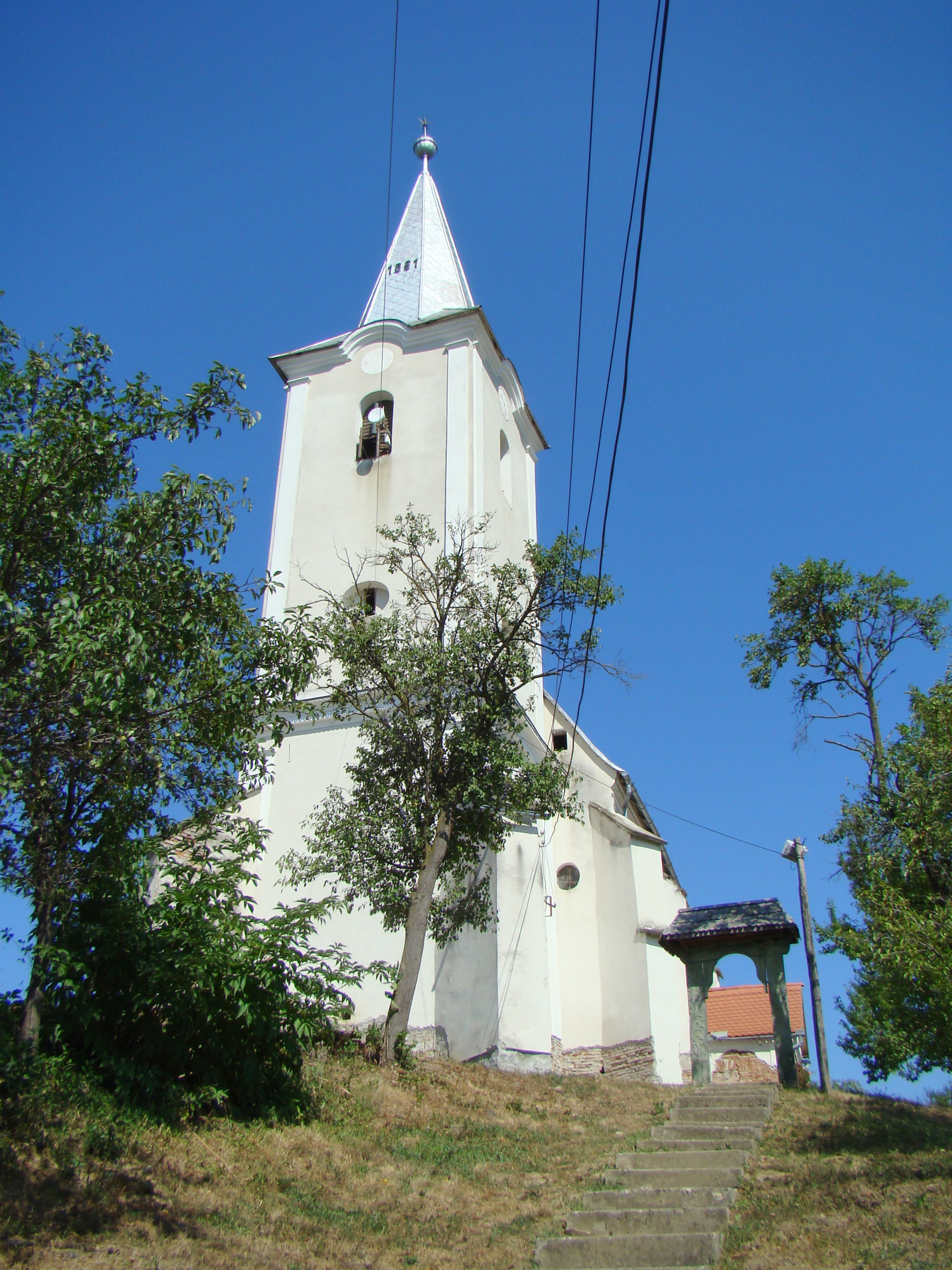
- Unitarian church in Gălățeni

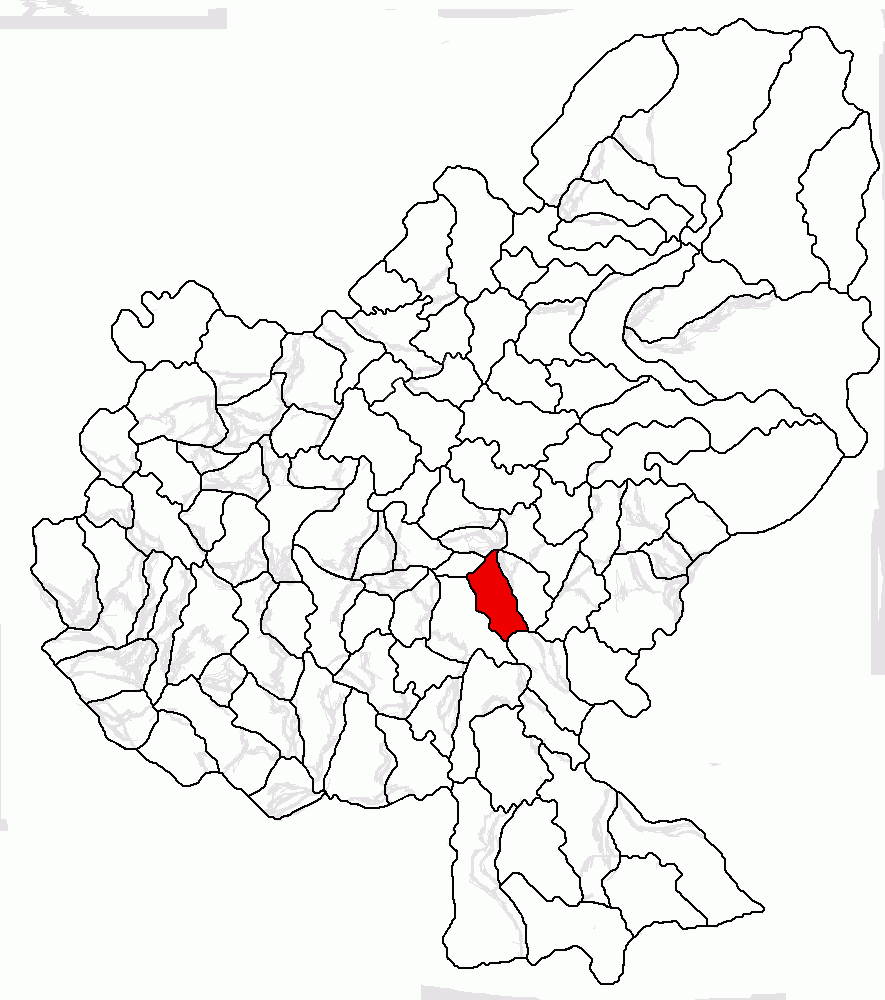
- Location in Mureș County

- Location in Romania
- Coordinates: 46°29′N 24°42′E
- Country: Romania
- County: Mureș

Government
  - Mayor (2020–2024): Antal Szőcs (UDMR)
- Area: 30.19 km^{2} (11.66 sq mi)
- Elevation: 328 m (1,076 ft)
- Population (2021-12-01): 1,758
  - Density: 58.23/km^{2} (150.8/sq mi)
- Time zone: UTC+02:00 (EET)
  - Summer (DST): UTC+03:00 (EEST)
- Postal code: 547455
- Area code: (+40) 0265
- Vehicle reg.: MS
- Website: pasareni.ro

Păsăreni (Hungarian: Backamadaras, Hungarian pronunciation: [ˈbɒtskɒmɒdɒrɒʃ]) is a commune in Mureș County, Transylvania, Romania composed of three villages: Bolintineni (Nyárádbálintfalva), Gălățeni (Szentgerice), and Păsăreni.

== Demographics ==
According to the 2011 census, the commune had a population of 1,907, of which 81% were Hungarians, 11% were Roma, and 5% were Romanians. At the 2021 census, Păsăreni had a population of 1,758; of those, 72.81% were Hungarians, 18.6% Roma, and 2.39% Romanians.

== Natives ==
- Ernest Gal (born 1950), rower
- Iuliu Szöcs (1937 – 1992), volleyball player

== See also ==
- List of Hungarian exonyms (Mureș County)
