= Nikolay Vasilyev (rower) =

Soviet rower

Personal information
- Born: 2 April 1952 (age 72)

Sport
- Sport: Rowing

Nikolay Vasilyev (Russian: Николай Васильев; born 2 April 1952) is a Soviet rower. He competed at the 1972 Summer Olympics in Munich with the men's coxless pair where they came eighths.
