= Neil Keron =

British rower (born 1953)

Neil Alexander Keron
Personal information
- Nationality: British
- Born: 24 March 1953 (age 71); Bedford, England
- Education: Bedford Modern School

Sport
- Sport: Rowing
- Team: GB Rowing Team

Achievements and titles
- Olympic finals: 1976 Summer Olympics

Neil Alexander Keron (born 24 March 1953) is a British rower who competed in the 1973 European Championships and the 1976 Summer Olympics.

In 1973 he was a crew member of the British boat that finished fourth in the European Championships in Moscow. In 1976 he was a crew member of the British boat which finished twelfth in the coxless fours event on the stroke side.

Keron was born in Bedford and educated at Bedford Modern School.
