= Finn Tveter =

Norwegian jurist and rower (1947–2018)

Medal record

Men's rowing

Representing Norway

Olympic Games
Silver medal – second place	1976 Montreal	Coxless four

World Rowing Championships
Bronze medal – third place	1970 St. Catharines	Coxed four

Finn Ivar Tveter (19 November 1947 – 30 July 2018) was a Norwegian jurist and Olympic rower.

He received a silver medal in coxless four at the 1976 Summer Olympics in Montreal, together with Ole Nafstad, Rolf Andreassen, and Arne Bergodd. He also competed at the 1972 Summer Olympics, and won a bronze medal at the 1970 World Championships.

By profession, Tveter was a jurist. He worked in the Norwegian Consumer Council, as a lawyer, and chaired the Bankklagenemnda from 1988 to 1997. From 1997 on he was the director of the Norwegian Association of Real Estate Agents.

Tveter grew up in Skøyen and Bøler, but at the time of his death resided in Haslum. He was married and has three daughters.
