= Selwyn Maister =

New Zealand field hockey player

Selwyn Maister QSM
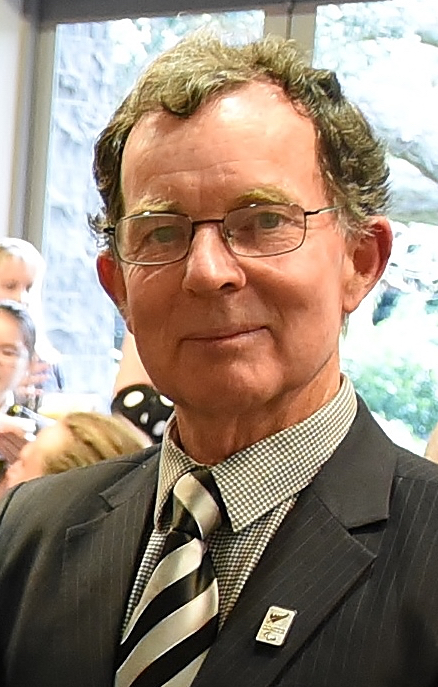
- Maister in 2017

Personal information
- Full name: Selwyn Gerald Maister
- Born: 24 May 1946 (age 80) Christchurch, New Zealand
- Relative: Barry Maister (brother)
Medal record
Men's field hockey
Representing New Zealand
Olympic Games
Gold medal – first place	1976 Montreal	Team competition

Selwyn Gerald Maister QSM (born 24 May 1946) is a former New Zealand field hockey player, who was a member of the national team that won the golden medal at the 1976 Summer Olympics in Montreal.

Maister was awarded the Queen's Service Medal in the 2012 New Year Honours, for services to hockey. Maister earned a DPhil in inorganic chemistry from Magdalen College, Oxford, as a Rhodes Scholar, arriving in 1969.

He is a brother of hockey player Barry Maister.
