= Jozef Jordaens =

Belgian rower

Personal information
- Nationality: Belgian
- Born: 20 February 1950 (age 75); Brasschaat, Belgium

Sport
- Sport: Rowing

Jozef Jordaens (born 20 February 1950) is a Belgian rower. He competed in the men's coxless four event at the 1976 Summer Olympics.
