= Arne Bergodd =

Norwegian rower (born 1948)

Personal information
- Born: 16 August 1948 (age 77) Drammen, Buskerud
- Height: 190 cm (6 ft 3 in)
- Weight: 84 kg (185 lb)

Sport
- Sport: Rowing
- Club: Drammen Roklubb
Medal record
Men's rowing
Representing Norway
Olympic Games
Silver medal – second place	1976 Montreal	Coxless four
European Rowing Championships
Bronze medal – third place	1973 Moscow	Coxless four

Arne Bergodd (born 16 August 1948) is a Norwegian competition rower and Olympic medalist.

He received a silver medal in coxless fours at the 1976 Summer Olympics in Montreal, together with Finn Tveter, Rolf Andreassen, and Ole Nafstad.
