= Emanuel Croce =

Argentine footballer

Personal information
- Full name: Nicolás Emanuel Croce
- Date of birth: 22 July 1985 (age 41)
- Place of birth: Cañada de Gómez, Argentina
- Height: 1.64 m (5 ft 5 in)
- Position: Midfielder

Youth career
- América CdG
- Rosario Central

Senior career*
Years	Team	Apps	(Gls)
2006–2013	Tiro Federal	103	(7)
2008–2009	→ Instituto (loan)	30	(2)
2011–2012	→ Aragua (loan)	31	(5)
2013	→ Ñublense (loan)	30	(2)
2014–2015	Ñublense	40	(2)
2016	Sportivo Las Parejas	–	(–)
2017	Atlético Piamonte	–	(–)
2018	Ñublense	26	(1)
2019	Atlético Piamonte	–	(–)
2020	Mitre de Landeta	–	(–)
- * Club domestic league appearances and goals

Nicolás Emanuel Croce (born 22 July 1985) is an Argentine former footballer who played as a midfielder.

== Teams ==
- (Argentina) América Cañada de Gómez (youth)
- (Argentina) Rosario Central (youth)
- (Argentina) Tiro Federal 2006–2008
- (Argentina) Instituto 2008–2009
- (Argentina) Tiro Federal 2009–2011
- (Venezuela) Aragua 2011–2012
- (Argentina) Tiro Federal 2012
- (Chile) Ñublense 2013–2015
- (Argentina) Sportivo Las Parejas 2016
- (Argentina) Atlético Piamonte 2017
- (Chile) Ñublense 2018
- (Argentina) Atlético Piamonte 2019
- (Argentina) Mitre de Landeta
