= Wolfgang Mager =

East German rower

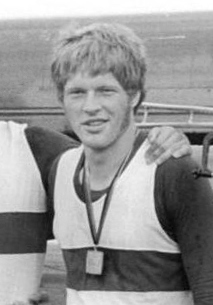
- Mager in 1974

Personal information
- Born: 24 August 1952 (age 73) Kamenz, East Germany
- Height: 190 cm (6 ft 3 in)
- Weight: 90 kg (198 lb)

Sport
- Sport: Rowing
- Club: SC DHfK, Leipzig
Medal record
Representing East Germany
Olympic Games
Gold medal – first place	1972 Munich	Coxless pair
Gold medal – first place	1976 Montreal	Coxless four
World Rowing Championships
Gold medal – first place	1974 Lucerne	Coxless four
Gold medal – first place	1975 Nottingham	Coxless four
Gold medal – first place	1977 Amsterdam	Coxless four
Silver medal – second place	1978 Cambridge	Coxless four
Gold medal – first place	1979 Bled	Coxless four

Wolfgang Mager (born 24 August 1952) is a retired German rower. He competed for East Germany, first in coxless pairs, together with Siegfried Brietzke, and then in coxless fours. In these events he won Olympic gold medals in 1972 and 1976, as well as four world championships in 1974–1979. In the 1980 Olympics, the East German boat won the gold medal again, but Mager suffered a hand injury before the Games and was replaced by Jürgen Thiele.
