= Ivan Sutherland (rower) =

New Zealand rower (born 1950)

Ivan Sutherland MNZM
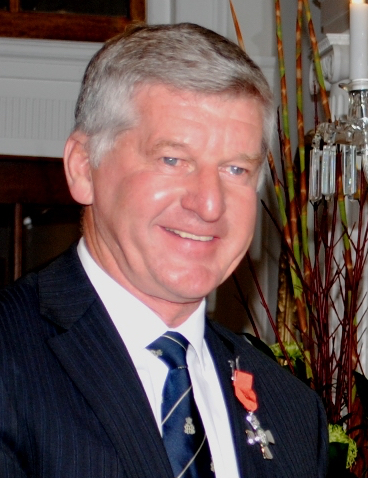
- Sutherland in 2011

Personal information
- Born: Ivan Carl Sutherland; 15 September 1950 (age 75) Blenheim, New Zealand
- Relative: Alan Sutherland (brother)

Sport
- Sport: Rowing
Medal record
Men's rowing
Representing New Zealand
Summer Olympics
Bronze medal – third place	1976 Montreal	Eight
World Rowing Championships
Silver medal – second place	1977 Amsterdam	Four
Bronze medal – third place	1978 Karapiro	Eight

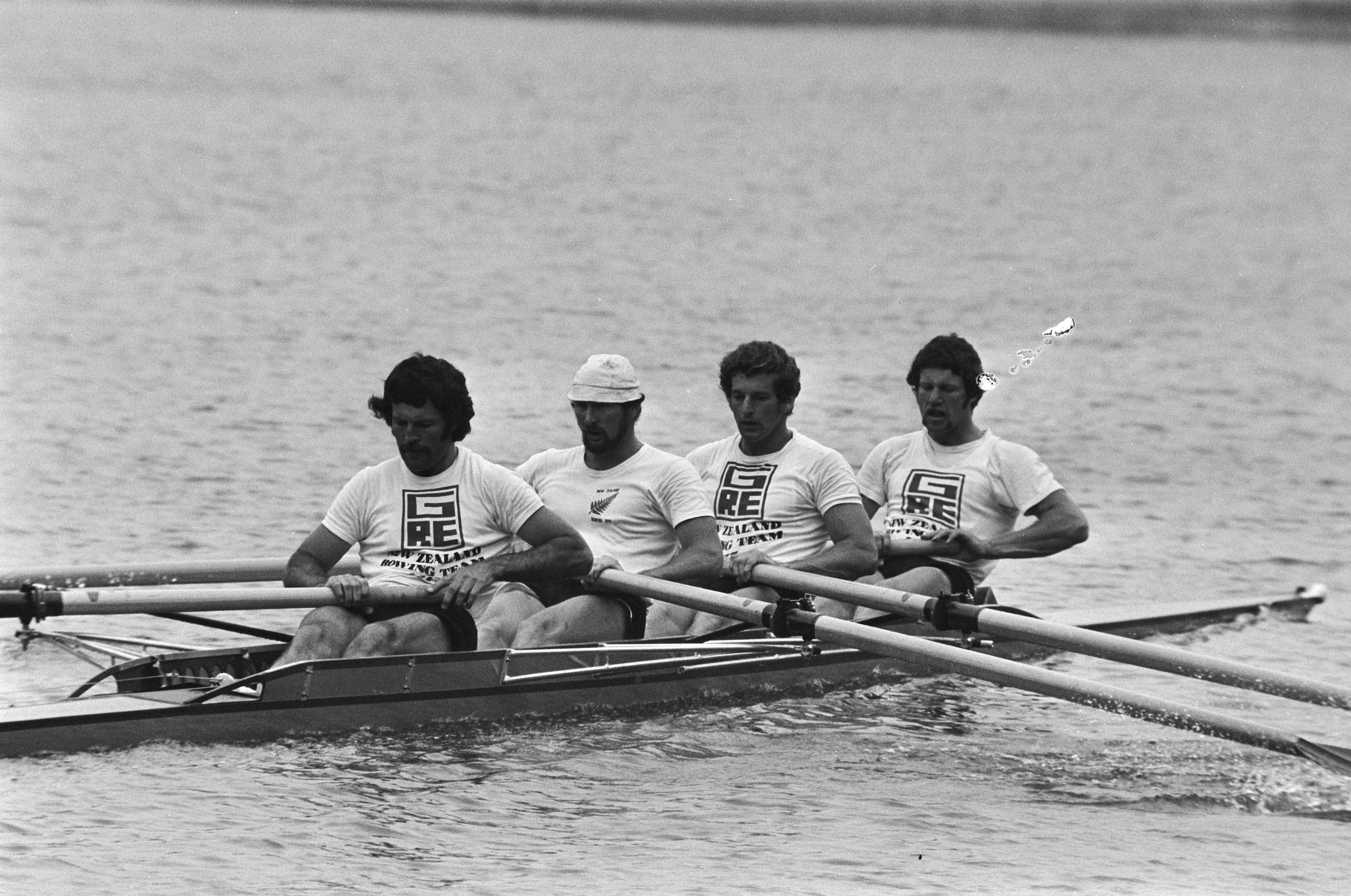
1977 New Zealand coxless four on the Bosbaan rowing lake in Amsterdam

Ivan Carl Sutherland MNZM (born 15 September 1950) is a former New Zealand rower who won an Olympic bronze medal. At the 1976 Summer Olympics in Montreal, he crewed the eight along Tony Hurt, Alec McLean, Trevor Coker, Peter Dignan, Lindsay Wilson, Joe Earl and Dave Rodger and Simon Dickie (cox). The 1977 World Rowing Championships saw Sutherland win silver in the coxless four with Des Lock, David Lindstrom and Dave Rodger under new coach Harry Mahon. Sutherland was also the rowing team manager for New Zealand at the 1988 Summer Olympics in Seoul and the 1992 Summer Olympics in Barcelona. He was subsequently a national rowing selector.

In the 2011 Queen's Birthday Honours, Sutherland was appointed a Member of the New Zealand Order of Merit, for services to rowing and viticulture.
