= Miguel Ruiz (rower) =

Mexican rower (born 1953)

Personal information
- Nationality: Mexican
- Born: 22 April 1953 (age 71)

Sport
- Sport: Rowing

Miguel Ruiz (born 22 April 1953) is a Mexican rower. He competed in the men's coxless pair event at the 1972 Summer Olympics.
