= Miguel Ruiz (businessman) =

Puerto Rican businessman

- Born: 1856; San Juan, Puerto Rico
- Died: 1912 (aged 55–56); San Juan, Puerto Rico
- Occupation: Businessman

Notes
- Founded the company which would eventually produce "Cafe Yaucono"

Miguel Ruiz (1856–1912) founded a coffee processing company which would later become "Jimenez & Fernandez, Sucrs, Inc." the makers of Café Yaucono.

== Early years ==
Ruiz, a native of San Juan, Puerto Rico, began working in the coffee industry at a young age. His interest in that sector of agriculture led him to establish a small coffee processing company in Miramar, a section of San Juan. In 1896, Ruiz started elaborating coffee using rudimentary equipment. His small operation started to grow and he soon sent for his cousin-in-law, Tiburio Jiménez, who lived in Spain. In 1911, Jiménez went to work and immediately, he too fell in love with the coffee industry. In 1912, tragedy befell upon the family and Miguel Ruiz died. He left the company in the hands of his family and Jimenez.

== "Cafe Yaucono" ==
Tomas Prado, from Yauco was the owner of "The Coffee Co." and in 1914, created the coffee brand "Cafe Yaucono". Jiménez became interested in the brand and soon began negotiations with Prado with the intention of buying him out. In 1916, Prado sold "The Coffee Co." and its brand "Yaucono" to the heirs of Migul Ruiz. In 1917, the Ruiz family sold the company and Jiménez quit the company. Soon afterwards, Jiménez started his own company with Juan Fernández which they named "Jiménez & Fernandez, Sucrs.".

== Jiménez & Fernandez, Sucrs, Inc. ==
In 1921, the company, which was incorporated and renamed "Jimenez & Fernandez, Sucrs, Inc.", bought a lot in the Fernández Juncos Ave. and built a two-story building. The company operated in the first floor and the Jiménez family lived in the second floor. Jiménez married and had three children, among them José Enrique Jiménez.

In 1931, Juan Fernández sold his part of the company to Jiménez. During this period the company was faced with limitations and hardships. The Great Depression, hurricanes and World War II almost completely bankrupted the entire coffee industry in Puerto Rico. Jiménez was forced to close his company on two occasions during this time.

When Jiménez reopened the company, the demand for coffee was so great that its sales soared. In 1957, Tiburcio's son José Enrique, began to work for "Yaucono" and in 1960, he was named Manager of the Sales and Marketing departments. José Enrique started a strong advertising campaign and in 1963 introduced the "Cafe Yaucono" character "Mama Inés", becoming one of the biggest marketing symbols in Puerto Rican history. In 1965, José Enrique was named president and CEO of the company.

== Postscript ==
In 1985, "Café Yaucono" received the highest award from the Puerto Rico Product Association, the "International Award for Quality". In 1996, "Cafe Yaucono" received the "Commercial Prestige Award" from Spain. "Cafe Yaucono" controls 40% of the coffee market in Puerto Rico.

Miguel Ruiz died in San Juan, Puerto Rico in 1912 and Tiburcio Jiménez died in 1975 in the same city.

== See also ==
- List of Puerto Ricans
- Café Rico
