= Natale Spinello =

Italian rower

Personal information
- Nationality: Italian
- Born: 15 December 1947 (age 77); Piove di Sacco, Italy

Sport
- Sport: Rowing

Natale Spinello (born 15 December 1947) is an Italian rower. He competed in the men's coxless four event at the 1976 Summer Olympics.
