= Lubomír Zapletal =

Czech rower

Personal information
- Nationality: Czech
- Born: 31 December 1951 (age 73); Olomouc, Czechoslovakia

Sport
- Sport: Rowing

Lubomír Zapletal (born 31 December 1951) is a Czech rower. He competed at the 1972 Summer Olympics, 1976 Summer Olympics and the 1980 Summer Olympics.
