= Tony Brooks (rower) =

American rower (born 1950)

Personal information
- Nationality: American
- Born: August 3, 1950 (age 75) Indianapolis, Indiana, U.S.

Sport
- Sport: Rowing

Tony Brooks (born August 3, 1950) is an American rower. He competed in the men's coxless four event at the 1976 Summer Olympics. He graduated from Harvard University and Harvard Business School. He is currently the coach of the St. Ignatius Women's Crew.
