= Ole Nafstad =

Norwegian rower (born 1946)

Personal information
- Born: Ole Sverre Nafstad; 20 February 1946 (age 80) Bærum, Akershus
- Height: 193 cm (6 ft 4 in)
- Weight: 87 kg (192 lb)

Sport
- Sport: Rowing
- Club: Bærum Roklub
Medal record
Men's rowing
Representing Norway
Olympic Games
Silver medal – second place	1976 Montreal	Coxless four
European Rowing Championships
Silver medal – second place	1971 Copenhagen	Coxless four
Bronze medal – third place	1973 Moscow	Coxless four

Ole Sverre Nafstad (born 20 February 1946 in Bærum, Akershus) is a Norwegian competition rower and Olympic medalist.

Nafstad competed at the 1971 European Rowing Championships and won a silver medal with the coxless four. He competed at the 1972 Summer Olympics in Munich in the coxless four and the team was eliminated in the round one repêchage. At the 1973 European Rowing Championships in Moscow, he competed in the coxless pair and they won bronze. He received a silver medal in coxless four at the 1976 Summer Olympics in Montreal, together with Finn Tveter, Rolf Andreassen, and Arne Bergodd.

He represented the club Bærum RK. He resides at Kolsås.
