= Neil McLeod (field hockey) =

Field hockey player

Olympic medal record

Men's field hockey
Gold medal – first place	Montreal 1976	Team competition

Neil Caradus McLeod (born 14 September 1952 in Whangārei) is a former field hockey player from New Zealand. He was a member of the national team that won the gold medal at the 1976 Summer Olympics in Montreal.
