= Hugh Stevenson (rower) =

American rower

Personal information
- Nationality: American
- Born: October 13, 1948 (age 76); London, England

Sport
- Sport: Rowing

Hugh Stevenson (born October 13, 1948) is an American rower. He competed in the men's coxless four event at the 1976 Summer Olympics.
