= Pellegrino Croce =

Italian rower

Personal information
- Nationality: Italian
- Born: 24 August 1955 (age 70) Naples, Italy

Sport
- Sport: Rowing

Pellegrino Croce (born 24 August 1955) is an Italian former rower. He competed in the men's coxless four event at the 1976 Summer Olympics.
