= Todor Mrankov =

Bulgarian rower (born 1955)

Personal information
- Nationality: Bulgarian
- Born: 3 August 1955 (age 70)

Sport
- Sport: Rowing
Medal record
Men's rowing
Representing Bulgaria
World Rowing Championships
| Gold medal – first place | 1977 Amsterdam | Coxed pair |

Todor Mrankov (born 3 August 1955) is a Bulgarian rower. He competed at the 1976 Summer Olympics and the 1980 Summer Olympics.
