= Rolf Andreassen =

Norwegian rower (born 1949)

Personal information
- Born: Rolf Siljan Andreassen; 3 April 1949 (age 77) Drammen
- Height: 190 cm (6 ft 3 in)
- Weight: 88 kg (194 lb)

Sport
- Sport: Rowing
Medal record
Men's rowing
Representing Norway
Olympic Games
Silver medal – second place	1976 Montreal	Coxless four
European Rowing Championships
Bronze medal – third place	1973 Moscow	Coxless four

Rolf Siljan Andreassen (born 3 April 1949) is a Norwegian competition rower and Olympic medalist.

He received a silver medal in the coxless four event at the 1976 Summer Olympics in Montreal, together with Finn Tveter, Ole Nafstad, and Arne Bergodd.
