= Paul De Weert =

Belgian rower

Personal information
- Nationality: Belgian
- Born: 27 November 1945 (age 79); Antwerp, Belgium

Sport
- Sport: Rowing

Paul De Weert (born 27 November 1945) is a Belgian rower. He competed at the 1972 Summer Olympics and the 1976 Summer Olympics.
