= Les Wilson (field hockey) =

New Zealand field hockey player

Personal information
- Full name: Ernest Leslie Wilson
- Born: 14 February 1952 (age 74) Wanganui
Medal record
Men's field hockey
Gold medal – first place	Montreal 1976	Team competition

Ernest Leslie "Les" Wilson (born 14 February 1952 in Wanganui) is a former field hockey goalkeeper from New Zealand, who was a member of the national team that won the golden medal at the 1976 Summer Olympics in Montreal, Canada.
