= Nicolae Simion =

Romanian rower

Personal information
- Nationality: Romanian
- Born: 17 May 1952 (age 72); Caraliu, Romania

Sport
- Sport: Rowing

Nicolae Simion (born 17 May 1952) is a Romanian rower. He competed at the 1976 Summer Olympics and the 1980 Summer Olympics.
