= Marcelo Gismondi =

Argentine rower

Personal information
- Nationality: Argentine
- Born: 20 February 1953 (age 72)

Sport
- Sport: Rowing

Marcelo Gismondi (born 20 February 1953) is an Argentine rower. He competed in the men's coxless four event at the 1976 Summer Olympics.
