= Ilie Oanță =

Romanian rower (born 1950)

Personal information
- Nationality: Romanian
- Born: 17 November 1950 (age 74); Bucharest, Romania

Sport
- Sport: Rowing

Ilie Oanță (born 17 November 1950) is a Romanian rower. He competed in the men's coxless pair event at the 1972 Summer Olympics.
