= Gary Piantedosi =

American rower (1954–2026)

Personal information
- Full name: Gary Gennaro Piantedosi
- National team: United States
- Born: December 9, 1954 Boston, Massachusetts, U.S.
- Died: June 4, 2026 (aged 71)
- Education: Massachusetts Institute of Technology

Sport
- Sport: Rowing

Gary Gennaro Piantedosi (December 9, 1954 – June 4, 2026) was an American rower. He competed in the men's coxless four event at the 1976 Summer Olympics.

== Biography ==
Piantedosi began rowing at the Massachusetts Institute of Technology varsity crew, with which he won silver medals at the Eastern Sprints and IRA Championships from 1973 to 1975. He was a spare for the United States team at the 1974 World Championships, he raced in the 1975 Pan American Games, and he raced in the 1976 Summer Olympics in Montreal. He became assistant coach for the Barehill Rowing Varsity Boys team in 2017 and was promoted to Head Coach in 2022.

He manufactured and designed rowing equipment and was the general manager of Aiden Rowing. Piantedosi was married to Ann Jonik and had two sons, Michael and Anthony Piantedosi. He died of cancer on June 4, 2026, at the age of 71.
