= José Luis Rion =

Mexican rower (born 1952)

Personal information
- Nationality: Mexican
- Born: 25 January 1952 (age 73)

Sport
- Sport: Rowing

José Luis Rion (born 25 January 1952) is a Mexican rower. He competed in the men's coxless pair event at the 1972 Summer Olympics.
