= Andrew van Ruyven =

Canadian rower

Personal information
- Born: 9 September 1952 (age 72); St. Catharines, Ontario, Canada

Sport
- Sport: Rowing

Andrew van Ruyven (born 9 September 1952) is a Canadian rower. He competed at the 1972 Summer Olympics and the 1976 Summer Olympics.
