= James Moroney =

American rower

Personal information
- Born: March 19, 1953 (age 73) Philadelphia, Pennsylvania, United States

Sport
- Sport: Rowing

James Moroney (born March 19, 1953) is an American rower. He competed at the 1972 Summer Olympics and the 1976 Summer Olympics.
