= Miguel Ángel Ruiz =

Miguel Ángel Ruiz may refer to:

- Miguel Ángel Ruiz (Argentine footballer) (1934–2009), Argentine football player and manager
- Miguel Ángel Ruiz (Spanish footballer) (born 1955), Spanish footballer
- Miguel Ángel Ruiz Macías ("Don Miguel Ruiz", born 1952), Mexican self-help writer
