= Stefan Semmler =

East German rower

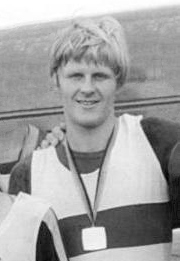
- Semmler in 1974

Personal information
- Born: 5 May 1952 (age 74) Zschopau, East Germany
- Height: 190 cm (6 ft 3 in)
- Weight: 93 kg (205 lb)

Sport
- Sport: Rowing
- Club: SC DHfK, Leipzig
Medal record
Representing East Germany
Olympic Games
Gold medal – first place	1976 Montreal	Coxless four
Gold medal – first place	1980 Moscow	Coxless four
World Rowing Championships
Gold medal – first place	1974 Lucerne	Coxless four
Gold medal – first place	1975 Nottingham	Coxless four
Gold medal – first place	1977 Amsterdam	Coxless four
Silver medal – second place	1978 Cambridge	Coxless four
Gold medal – first place	1979 Bled	Coxless four
European Rowing Championships
Gold medal – first place	1973 Moscow	Eight

Stefan Semmler (born 5 May 1952) is a retired East German rower. Competing in coxless fours he won Olympic gold medals in 1976 and 1980, as well as four world championships in 1974–1979.
