= Dumitru Grumezescu =

Romanian rower

Personal information
- Nationality: Romanian
- Born: 7 March 1949 (age 76) Cuci, Neamț County, Romania

Sport
- Sport: Rowing

Dumitru Grumezescu (born 7 March 1949) is a Romanian rower. He competed at the 1972 Summer Olympics and the 1976 Summer Olympics.
