= Rowing at the 1980 Summer Olympics – Women's quadruple sculls =

Women's quadruple Sculls at the Games of the XXII Olympiad
- Venue: Krylatskoye Rowing Canal
- Date: 21–26 July 1980
- Competitors: 35 from 7 nations

Medalists
1st place, gold medalist(s)		Sybille Reinhardt; Jutta Ploch; Jutta Lau; Roswietha Zobelt; Liane Buhr	East Germany
2nd place, silver medalist(s)		Antonina Pustovit; Yelena Matiyevskaya; Olga Vasilchenko; Nadezhda Lyubimova; Nina Cheremisina	Soviet Union
3rd place, bronze medalist(s)		Mariana Serbezova; Rumelyana Boncheva; Dolores Nakova; Anka Bakova; Anka Georgieva	Bulgaria

The women's quadruple sculls rowing competition at the 1980 Summer Olympics took place at Krylatskoye Sports Complex Canoeing and Rowing Basin, Moscow, Soviet Union. The event was held from 21 to 26 July. Whilst the equivalent men's event was coxless, the women's event was coxed.

== Heats ==
Winner of each heat advanced to final. The remaining teams must compete in repechage for the remaining spots in the final.

=== Heat One ===
Rank	Rowers	Country	Time
1	Maria Micşa-Macoviciuc, Aneta Mihaly, Sofia Corban-Banovici, Mariana Zaharia, Elena Giurcă	Romania	3:23.33
2	Ineke Donkervoort, Lili Meeuwisse, Greet Hellemans, Jos Compaan, Monique Pronk	Netherlands	3:25.64
3	Bogusława Kozłowska-Tomasiak, Mariola Abrahamczyk, Maria Kobylińska, Aleksandra Kaczyńska, Maria Dzieża	Poland	3:27.95
4	Judit Kéri, Valéria Gyimesi, Zoltanne Ribáry, Kamilla Kosztolányi, Erzsebet Nagy	Hungary	3:30.47

=== Heat Two ===
Rank	Rowers	Country	Time
1	Mariana Serbezova, Rumelyana Boncheva, Dolores Nakova, Anka Bakova, Anka Georgieva	Bulgaria	3:14.91
2	Antonina Pustovit, Yelena Matiyevskaya, Olga Vasilchenko, Nadezhda Lyubimova, Nataliya Kazak	Soviet Union	3:16.76
3	Sybille Reinhardt, Jutta Ploch, Gisela Medefindt, Roswietha Zobelt, Liane Buhr	East Germany	3:18.16

== Repechage ==
Rank	Athletes Names	Country	Time
1	Sybille Reinhardt, Jutta Ploch, Jutta Lau, Roswietha Zobelt, Liane Buhr	East Germany	3:17.00
2	Antonina Pustovit, Yelena Matiyevskaya, Olga Vasilchenko, Nadezhda Lyubimova, Nina Cheremisina	Soviet Union	3:19.88
3	Ineke Donkervoort, Lily Meeuwisse, Greet Hellemans, Jos Compaan, Monique Pronk	Netherlands	3:22.34
4	Bogusława Kozłowska-Tomasiak, Mariola Abrahamczyk, Maria Kobylińska, Aleksandra Kaczyńska, Maria Dzieża	Poland	3:22.75
5	Judit Kéri, Valéria Gyimesi, Zoltanne Ribáry, Kamilla Kosztolányi, Erzsebet Nagy	Hungary	3:22.98

== Finals ==
Rank	Athletes Names	Country	Time
1st place, gold medalist(s)	Sybille Reinhardt, Jutta Ploch, Jutta Lau, Roswietha Zobelt, Liane Buhr	East Germany	3:15.32
2nd place, silver medalist(s)	Antonina Pustovit, Yelena Matiyevskaya, Olga Vasilchenko, Nadezhda Lyubimova, Nina Cheremisina	Soviet Union	3:15.73
3rd place, bronze medalist(s)	Mariana Serbezova, Rumelyana Boncheva, Dolores Nakova, Anka Bakova, Anka Georgieva	Bulgaria	3:16.10
4	Maria Macoviviuc, Aneta Mihaly, Stela Banovici, Mariana Zaharia, Elena Giurcă	Romania	3:16.82
5	Bogusława Kozłowska-Tomasiak, Mariola Abrahamczyk, Maria Kobylińska, Aleksandra Kaczyńska, Maria Dzieża	Poland	3:20.95
6	Ineke Donkervoort, Lily Meeuwisse, Greet Hellemans, Jos Compaan, Monique Pronk	Netherlands	3:22.64

== Sources ==
- Fizkultura i Sport, ed. (1981). The Official Report of the Games of the XXII Olympiad Moscow 1980 Volume Three (PDF). p. 119. Archived from the original (PDF) on 27 September 2007.
