= Rowing at the 1976 Summer Olympics – Women's quadruple sculls =

Women's quadruple sculls at the Games of the XXI Olympiad
- Date: 19–24 July 1976
- Competitors: 45 from 9 nations

Medalists
1st place, gold medalist(s)		Anke Borchmann; Jutta Lau; Viola Poley; Roswietha Zobelt; Liane Weigelt	East Germany
2nd place, silver medalist(s)		Anna Kondrachina; Mira Bryunina; Larisa Aleksandrova; Galina Ermolaeva; Nadezhda Chernyshyova	Soviet Union
3rd place, bronze medalist(s)		Ioana Tudoran; Maria Micșa; Felicia Afrăsiloaie; Elisabeta Lazăr; Elena Giurcă	Romania

The women's quadruple sculls competition at the 1976 Summer Olympics took place at Notre Dame Island Olympic Basin, Canada. It was the first time the event was contested for women.

== Competition format ==
The competition consisted of two main rounds (heats and finals) as well as a repechage. The 9 boats were divided into two heats for the first round, with 5 boats in one heat and 4 boats in the other. The winner of each heat advanced directly to the "A" final (1st through 6th place). The remaining 7 boats were placed in the repechage. Two heats were held in the repechage, with 4 boats in one heat and 3 boats in the other. The top two boats in each heat of the repechage went to the "A" final as well. The remaining 3 boats (3rd and 4th placers in the repechage heats) competed in the "B" final for 7th through 9th place.

All races were over a 1000 metre course. The 1976 event (along with the 1980 and 1984 competitions) featured a coxswain in each boat; later editions dropped the coxswain.

== Results ==
=== Heats ===
==== Heat 1 ====
Rank	Rowers	Coxswain	Nation	Time	Notes
1	Mira Bryunina; Anna Kondrachina; Larisa Aleksandrova; Galina Yermolayeva	Nadezhda Chernyshyova	Soviet Union	3:11.74	QA
2	Felicia Afrăsiloaie; Elisabeta Lazăr; Maria Micșa; Ioana Tudoran	Elena Giurcă	Romania	3:14.86	R
3	Marie Bartáková; Hana Kavková; Anna Marešová; Jarmila Pátková	Alena Svobodová	Czechoslovakia	3:15.51	R
4	Lisa Hansen; Liz Hills; Karen McCloskey; Claudia Schneider	Irene Moreno	United States	3:18.02	R
5	Judith Andersen; Else Mærsk-Kristensen; Karen Margrethe Nielsen; Kirsten Thomsen	Kirsten Plum Jensen	Denmark	3:19.95	R

==== Heat 2 ====
Rank	Rowers	Coxswain	Nation	Time	Notes
1	Anke Borchmann; Jutta Lau; Viola Poley; Roswietha Zobelt	Liane Buhr	East Germany	3:08.49	QA
2	Verka Aleksieva; Svetlana Gincheva; Troyanka Vasileva; Iskra Velinova	Stanka Georgieva	Bulgaria	3:12.13	R
3	Ilona Bata; Valéria Gyimesi; Kamilla Kosztolányi; Erzsébet Nagy	Ágnes Szijj	Hungary	3:15.51	R
4	Guylaine Bernier; Barbara Boettcher; Elaine Bourbeau; Sandra Kirby	Johanne Delisle	Canada	3:29.37	R

=== Repechage ===
==== Repechage heat 1 ====
Rank	Rowers	Coxswain	Nation	Time	Notes
1	Felicia Afrăsiloaie; Elisabeta Lazăr; Maria Micșa; Ioana Tudoran	Elena Giurcă	Romania	3:27.48	QA
2	Judith Andersen; Else Mærsk-Kristensen; Karen Margrethe Nielsen; Kirsten Thomsen	Kirsten Plum Jensen	Denmark	3:31.61	QA
3	Ilona Bata; Valéria Gyimesi; Kamilla Kosztolányi; Erzsébet Nagy	Ágnes Szijj	Hungary	3:37.29	QB
4	Guylaine Bernier; Barbara Boettcher; Elaine Bourbeau; Sandra Kirby	Johanne Delisle	Canada	3:38.22	QB

==== Repechage heat 2 ====
Rank	Rowers	Coxswain	Nation	Time	Notes
1	Verka Aleksieva; Svetlana Gincheva; Troyanka Vasileva; Iskra Velinova	Stanka Georgieva	Bulgaria	3:22.43	QA
2	Marie Bartáková; Hana Kavková; Anna Marešová; Jarmila Pátková	Alena Svobodová	Czechoslovakia	3:26.75	QA
3	Lisa Hansen; Liz Hills; Karen McCloskey; Claudia Schneider	Irene Moreno	United States	3:27.82	QB

=== Finals ===
==== Final B ====
Rank	Rowers	Coxswain	Nation	Time
7	Lisa Hansen; Liz Hills; Karen McCloskey; Claudia Schneider	Irene Moreno	United States	3:46.06
8	Ilona Bata; Valéria Gyimesi; Kamilla Kosztolányi; Erzsébet Nagy	Ágnes Szijj	Hungary	3:55.33
9	Guylaine Bernier; Barbara Boettcher; Elaine Bourbeau; Sandra Kirby	Johanne Delisle	Canada	3:57.72

==== Final A ====
Rank	Rowers	Coxswain	Nation	Time
1st place, gold medalist(s)	Anke Borchmann; Jutta Lau; Viola Poley; Roswietha Zobelt	Liane Buhr	East Germany	3:29.99
2nd place, silver medalist(s)	Mira Bryunina; Anna Kondrachina; Larisa Aleksandrova; Galina Yermolayeva	Nadezhda Chernyshyova	Soviet Union	3:32.49
3rd place, bronze medalist(s)	Felicia Afrăsiloaie; Elisabeta Lazăr; Maria Micșa; Ioana Tudoran	Elena Giurcă	Romania	3:32.76
4	Verka Aleksieva; Svetlana Gincheva; Troyanka Vasileva; Iskra Velinova	Stanka Georgieva	Bulgaria	3:34.13
5	Marie Bartáková; Hana Kavková; Anna Marešová; Jarmila Pátková	Alena Svobodová	Czechoslovakia	3:42.53
6	Judith Andersen; Else Mærsk-Kristensen; Karen Margrethe Nielsen; Kirsten Thomsen	Kirsten Plum Jensen	Denmark	3:46.99

== Final classification ==
Rank	Rowers	Country
1st place, gold medalist(s)	Anke Borchmann; Jutta Lau; Viola Poley; Roswietha Zobelt; Liane Weigelt	East Germany
2nd place, silver medalist(s)	Anna Kondrachina; Mira Bryunina; Larisa Aleksandrova; Galina Ermolaeva; Nadezhda Chernyshyova	Soviet Union
3rd place, bronze medalist(s)	Ioana Tudoran; Maria Micșa; Felicia Afrăsiloaie; Elisabeta Lazăr; Elena Giurcă	Romania
4	Iskra Velinova; Verka Aleksieva; Troyanka Vasileva; Svetlana Gincheva; Stanka Georgieva	Bulgaria
5	Anna Marešová; Marie Bartáková; Jarmila Pátková; Hana Kavková; Alena Svobodová	Czechoslovakia
6	Kirsten Thomsen; Else Mærsk-Kristensen; Judith Andersen; Karen Margrethe Nielsen; Kirsten Plum Jensen	Denmark
7	Karen McCloskey; Lisa Hansen; Liz Hills; Claudia Schneider; Irene Moreno	United States
8	Ilona Bata; Kamilla Kosztolányi; Valéria Gyimesi; Ágnes Szijj; Erzsébet Nagy	Hungary
9	Sandra Kirby; Elaine Bourbeau; Guylaine Bernier; Barbara Boettcher; Johanne Delisle	Canada
