= Rowing at the 1984 Summer Olympics – Women's double sculls =

Women's double sculls at the Games of the XXIII Olympiad
- Date: 30 July – 4 August 1984
- Competitors: 16 from 8 nations

Medalists
1st place, gold medalist(s)		Marioara Popescu; Elisabeta Lipă	Romania
2nd place, silver medalist(s)		Greet Hellemans; Nicolette Hellemans	Netherlands
3rd place, bronze medalist(s)		Daniele Laumann; Silken Laumann	Canada

The women's double sculls competition at the 1984 Summer Olympics took place at took place at Lake Casitas, California, United States of America. The event was won by Romanians Marioara Popescu and Elisabeta Lipă (then Elisabeta Oleniuc); it was the first of Lipă's 5 Olympic gold medals (and 8 total Olympic medals).

== Competition format ==
The competition consisted of two main rounds (heats and finals) as well as a repechage. The 8 competitors were divided into two heats for the first round, with 4 boats in each heat. The winner of each heat advanced directly to the "A" final (1st through 6th place). The remaining 6 rowers were placed in the repechage. A single heat was held in the repechage. The top four boats in the repechage went to the "A" final. The remaining 2 boats (5th and 6th placers in the repechage) competed in the "B" final for 7th and 8th place.

All races were over a 1000 metre course.

== Results ==
=== Heats ===
The heats were held on July 30. The winner of each advanced to the A final, with all others going to the repechage. No boats were eliminated in this round.

==== Heat 1 ====
The first heat featured all three of the eventual medalists. The race was held during calm winds. The Romanian pair led by over 2 seconds at the halfway mark, holding to that lead over the second half of the race. The British boat was only half a second behind the Dutch team after 500 metres before falling back to 9 seconds out of third place at the end.

Rank	Rower	Nation	Time	Notes
1	Elisabeta Lipă; Marioara Popescu	Romania	3:24.28	QA
2	Daniele Laumann; Silken Laumann	Canada	3:26.72	R
3	Greet Hellemans; Nicolette Hellemans	Netherlands	3:28.67	R
4	Sally Bloomfield; Nonie Ray	Great Britain	3:37.72	R

==== Heat 2 ====
The race was held during calm winds. At the halfway mark, the Norwegians held a 1.33 second lead over the Swedes. The Austrians and Americans were further back, with Austria holding a very slight lead for third place. Over the second half of the course, the Swedes pulled closer but were unable to catch the Norwegians. The Austrians fell back to fourth place, finishing nearly 6 seconds after the Americans.

Rank	Rower	Nation	Time	Notes
1	Solfrid Johansen; Haldis Lenes	Norway	3:27.87	QA
2	Marie Carlsson; Carina Gustavsson	Sweden	3:28.41	R
3	Judy Geer Cathy Thaxton-Tippett	United States	3:30.91	R
4	Inge Niedermayer; Vera Sommerbauer	Austria	3:36.62	R

=== Repechage ===
The repechage was held on August 1. The race was held during calm winds. The temperature was significantly cooler than during the heats (16 °C vs. 27 °C). By the halfway mark, the boats had separated into two groups, with the Canadians leading the Dutch and Swedes in the lead group while the Americans led the Brits and Austrians in the second group. The results of the second group were more important, as the top 4 boats advanced to the main final; the Americans pulled closer to the lead group while the British and Austrian boats fell further behind. The Dutch pair had the best second-half, taking the lead while the Canadians fell from first to third.

Rank	Rower	Nation	Time	Notes
1	Greet Hellemans; Nicolette Hellemans	Netherlands	3:28.67	QA
2	Marie Carlsson; Carina Gustavsson	Sweden	3:28.41	QA
3	Daniele Laumann; Silken Laumann	Canada	3:26.72	QA
4	Judy Geer Cathy Thaxton-Tippett	United States	3:30.91	QA
5	Inge Niedermayer; Vera Sommerbauer	Austria	3:36.62	QB
6	Sally Bloomfield; Nonie Ray	Great Britain	3:37.72	QB

=== Finals ===
==== Final B ====
The "B" final was held on August 3. It featured the last two boats from the repechage, facing off for 7th and 8th place. There was an east-northeast wind at 1.2 m/s, and the weather was warmer again (23 °C). The British boat led by half a second at the halfway mark, but the Austrians had a strong second half to win by nearly 4 seconds.

Rank	Rower	Nation	Time
7	Inge Niedermayer; Vera Sommerbauer	Austria	3:36.20
8	Sally Bloomfield; Nonie Ray	Great Britain	3:40.08

==== Final A ====
The "A" final was held on August 4, with calm winds but cooler temperatures (18 °C). The Romanians established a 1-second lead by halfway, increasing to a final margin of victory of nearly 2.4 seconds. The next three boats were closer than that but still relatively separated, with the Canadians taking bronze at 0.7 seconds behind the Dutch silver medalists and the Swedes in fourth at 1 second after that. The Norwegian boat, despite winning its heat, found itself in a tight race for 5th and 6th place against the Americans, beating them by only a quarter-second.

Rank	Rower	Nation	Time
1st place, gold medalist(s)	Elisabeta Lipă; Marioara Popescu	Romania	3:26.75
2nd place, silver medalist(s)	Greet Hellemans; Nicolette Hellemans	Netherlands	3:29.13
3rd place, bronze medalist(s)	Daniele Laumann; Silken Laumann	Canada	3:29.82
4	Marie Carlsson; Carina Gustavsson	Sweden	3:30.79
5	Solfrid Johansen; Haldis Lenes	Norway	3:32.09
6	Judy Geer Cathy Thaxton-Tippett	United States	3:32.33

== Final classification ==
Rank	Rowers	Country
1st place, gold medalist(s)	Marioara Popescu; Elisabeta Lipă	Romania
2nd place, silver medalist(s)	Greet Hellemans; Nicolette Hellemans	Netherlands
3rd place, bronze medalist(s)	Daniele Laumann; Silken Laumann	Canada
4	Carina Gustavsson; Marie Carlsson	Sweden
5	Haldis Lenes; Solfrid Johansen	Norway
6	Cathy Thaxton-Tippett; Judy Geer	United States
7	Inge Niedermayer; Vera Sommerbauer	Austria
8	Nonie Ray; Sally Bloomfield	Great Britain
