= Anke Borchmann =

East German rower (born 1954)

Personal information
- Born: Anke Grünberg; 23 June 1954 (age 72) Neukalen, Bezirk Neubrandenburg, East Germany
- Height: 176 cm (5 ft 9 in)
- Weight: 65 kg (143 lb)

Sport
- Sport: Rowing
- Club: SC Dynamo Berlin (until 1976); SG Dynamo Potsdam (from 1977)
Medal record
Women's rowing
Representing East Germany
Olympic Games
Gold medal – first place	1976 Montreal	Coxed quad sculls
World Rowing Championships
Gold medal – first place	1975 Nottingham	Coxed quad sculls
Gold medal – first place	1977 Amsterdam	Double sculls

Anke Borchmann (née Grünberg; born 23 June 1954) is a German rower who competed for East Germany in the 1970s.

== Early life ==
Grünberg was born in Neukalen, Mecklenburg-Vorpommern, in 1954.

== Rowing career ==
Grünberg competed for SC Dynamo Berlin. Under her maiden name, she came third at the 1971 East German national championships in quad scull. At the 1973 East German national championships she came second in the same boat class. At the 1974 East German national championships she won the quad scull title, came second in the single scull (beaten by Christine Scheiblich), and came third in the double scull alongside Sabine Jahn. She travelled to the 1974 World Rowing Championships as a reserve but did not compete. At the 1975 East German national championships she defended her quad scull title. She was nominated for the 1975 World Rowing Championships in Nottingham, Great Britain, where her quad scull team took out the world title.

From the 1976 rowing season, she started under her married name Borchmann. She was nominated for the Olympic team and did therefore not compete at the national championships that year. She won at the 1976 Summer Olympics in the coxed quad sculls. For her Olympic performance, Borchmann was awarded a Patriotic Order of Merit in silver.

In 1977, Borchmann changed to the double sculls and teamed up with Roswietha Zobelt; she also transferred to SG Dynamo Potsdam where Zobelt was also based. They won the 1977 national championships in that boat class. At the 1977 World Rowing Championships, the East German women's team took all six gold medals, with Borchmann and Zobelt having achieved the largest margin to the second-placed boat at 3.21 seconds.

In the 1978 season, Borchmann and Zobelt could not retain their dominance. At a regatta in Moscow, they were beaten by the Soviet team Ludmila Parfenova and Eleonora Kaminskaitė with an 8-second margin. At an international regatta in Grünau near Berlin, they came third after the Bulgarians Svetla Otsetova and Zdravka Yordanova and the Soviet rowers. At the annual Rotsee regatta in Switzerland, two finals were rowed over two days and the Bulgarians won the first contest while the East Germans won the next day. A week later at the East German national championships, Borchmann and Zobelt were the favourites in the double scull but were beaten by the previously little-noticed Gisela Medefindt and Petra Boesler. They also started with the coxed quad scull where they surprised by beating the favourites. Borchmann and Zobelt were nominated in the double scull for the 1978 World Rowing Championships in New Zealand. In difficult conditions, they were passed by the whole field close to the finish line and came sixth. She retired after the 1978 season.

== Post-rowing ==
Borchmann worked in the administration of the National People's Army in Potsdam. After the German reunification, she transferred to the Wasserschutzpolizei. She lives in Werder.
