= Rowing at the 1980 Summer Olympics – Women's double sculls =

Women's Double Sculls at the Games of the XXII Olympiad
- Venue: Krylatskoye Rowing Canal
- Date: 21–26 July 1980
- Competitors: 14 from 7 nations

Medalists
1st place, gold medalist(s)		Yelena Khloptseva and Larisa Popova	Soviet Union
2nd place, silver medalist(s)		Cornelia Linse and Heidi Westphal	East Germany
3rd place, bronze medalist(s)		Olga Homeghi and Valeria Răcilă	Romania

The women's double sculls rowing competition at the 1980 Summer Olympics took place at Krylatskoye Sports Complex Canoeing and Rowing Basin, Moscow, Soviet Union. The event was held from 21 to 26 July.

== Heats ==
Winner of each heat advanced to final. The remaining teams must compete in repechage for the remaining spots in the final.

=== Heat One ===
Rank	Athletes Names	Country	Time
1	Yelena Khloptseva; Larisa Popova	Soviet Union	3:25.51
2	Olga Homeghi; Valeria Răcilă	Romania	3:27.70
3	Cornelia Linse; Heidi Westphal	East Germany	3:32.23
4	Svetla Otsetova; Zdravka Yordanova	Bulgaria	3:37.86

=== Heat Two ===
Rank	Athletes Names	Country	Time
1	Hanna Jarkiewicz; Janina Klucznik	Poland	3:34.11
2	Sue Handscomb; Astrid Ayling	Great Britain	3:39.27
3	Ilona Bata; Klára Langhoffer-Pétervári	Hungary	3:44.33

== Repechage ==
Rank	Athletes Names	Country	Time
1	Cornelia Linse; Heidi Westphal	East Germany	3:20.49
2	Svetla Otsetova; Zdravka Yordanova	Bulgaria	3:21.36
3	Olga Homeghi; Valeria Răcilă	Romania	3:21.74
4	Ilona Bata; Klára Langhoffer	Hungary	3:31.37
5	Sue Handscomb; Astrid Ayling	Great Britain	3:33.32

== Finals ==
Rank	Athletes Names	Country	Time
1st place, gold medalist(s)	Yelena Khloptseva; Larisa Popova	Soviet Union	3:16.27
2nd place, silver medalist(s)	Cornelia Linse; Heidi Westphal	East Germany	3:17.63
3rd place, bronze medalist(s)	Olga Homeghi; Valeria Răcilă	Romania	3:18.91
4	Svetla Otsetova; Zdravka Yordanova	Bulgaria	3:23.14
5	Hanna Jarkiewicz; Janina Klucznik	Poland	3:27.25
6	Ilona Bata; Klára Langhoffer	Hungary	3:35.70

== Sources ==
- Fizkultura i sport (ed.). The Official Report of the Games of the XXII Olympiad Moscow 1980 Volume Three (PDF). p. 116. Archived from the original (PDF) on 27 September 2007.
