= Rowing at the 1976 Summer Olympics – Women's coxless pair =

Women's coxless pair at the Games of the XXI Olympiad
- Date: 19–24 July 1976
- Competitors: 22 from 11 nations

Medalists
1st place, gold medalist(s)		Siyka Kelbecheva; Stoyanka Gruycheva	Bulgaria
2nd place, silver medalist(s)		Angelika Noack; Sabine Dähne	East Germany
3rd place, bronze medalist(s)		Edith Eckbauer; Thea Einöder	West Germany

The women's coxless pair competition at the 1976 Summer Olympics took place at Notre Dame Island Olympic Basin, Canada. It was the first time the event was contested for women.

== Competition format ==
The competition consisted of two main rounds (heats and finals) as well as a repechage. The 11 boats were divided into two heats for the first round, with 6 boats in one heat and 5 boats in the other. The winner of each heat advanced directly to the "A" final (1st through 6th place). The remaining 9 boats were placed in the repechage. Two heats were held in the repechage, with 5 boats in one heat and 4 boats in the other. The top two boats in each heat of the repechage went to the "A" final as well. The remaining 5 boats (3rd, 4th, and 5th placers in the repechage heats) competed in the "B" final for 7th through 11th place.

All races were over a 1000-metre course.

== Results ==
=== Heats ===
==== Heat 1 ====
Rank	Rowers	Nation	Time	Notes
1	Edith Eckbauer; Thea Einöder	West Germany	3:31.01	QA
2	Siyka Kelbecheva; Stoyanka Kurbatova	Bulgaria	3:33.24	R
3	Nataliya Horodilova; Hanna Karnaushenko	Soviet Union	3:33.91	R
4	Sabine Dähne; Angelika Noack	East Germany	3:36.26	R
5	Małgorzata Kawalska; Anna Krzemińska-Karbowiak	Poland	3:41.05	R
6	Lin Clark; Beryl Mitchell	Great Britain	3:42.53	R

==== Heat 2 ====
Rank	Rowers	Nation	Time	Notes
1	Elizabeth Craig; Tricia Smith	Canada	3:37.53	QA
2	Marinela Maxim Marlena Predescu-Zagoni	Romania	3:42.18	R
3	Oldřiška Pěkná; Zdena Tichá	Czechoslovakia	3:46.65	R
4	Sue Morgan Laura Staines	United States	3:46.76	R
5	Judit Kéri-Novák; Katalin Pál-Ribáry	Hungary	3:57.17	R

=== Repechage ===
==== Repechage heat 1 ====
Rank	Rowers	Nation	Time	Notes
1	Siyka Kelbecheva; Stoyanka Kurbatova	Bulgaria	3:48.73	QA
2	Sabine Dähne; Angelika Noack	East Germany	3:54.58	QA
3	Oldřiška Pěkná; Zdena Tichá	Czechoslovakia	4:01.18	QB
4	Lin Clark; Beryl Mitchell	Great Britain	4:02.54	QB
5	Judit Kéri-Novák; Katalin Pál-Ribáry	Hungary	4:06.81	QB

==== Repechage heat 2 ====
Rank	Rowers	Nation	Time	Notes
1	Nataliya Horodilova; Hanna Karnaushenko	Soviet Union	3:52.59	QA
2	Marinela Maxim Marlena Predescu-Zagoni	Romania	3:53.93	QA
3	Sue Morgan Laura Staines	United States	3:58.41	QB
4	Małgorzata Kawalska; Anna Krzemińska-Karbowiak	Poland	4:02.20	QB

=== Finals ===
==== Final B ====
Rank	Rowers	Nation	Time
7	Sue Morgan Laura Staines	United States	4:02.91
8	Małgorzata Kawalska; Anna Krzemińska-Karbowiak	Poland	4:03.26
9	Oldřiška Pěkná; Zdena Tichá	Czechoslovakia	4:05.10
10	Lin Clark; Beryl Mitchell	Great Britain	4:07.99
11	Judit Kéri-Novák; Katalin Pál-Ribáry	Hungary	4:11.93

==== Final A ====
Rank	Rowers	Nation	Time
1st place, gold medalist(s)	Siyka Kelbecheva; Stoyanka Kurbatova	Bulgaria	4:01.22
2nd place, silver medalist(s)	Sabine Dähne; Angelika Noack	East Germany	4:01.64
3rd place, bronze medalist(s)	Edith Eckbauer; Thea Einöder	West Germany	4:02.35
4	Nataliya Horodilova; Hanna Karnaushenko	Soviet Union	4:03.27
5	Elizabeth Craig; Tricia Smith	Canada	4:08.09
6	Marinela Maxim Marlena Predescu-Zagoni	Romania	4:15.44

== Final classification ==
Rank	Rowers	Country
1st place, gold medalist(s)	Siyka Kelbecheva; Stoyanka Gruycheva	Bulgaria
2nd place, silver medalist(s)	Angelika Noack; Sabine Dähne	East Germany
3rd place, bronze medalist(s)	Edith Eckbauer; Thea Einöder	West Germany
4	Nataliya Horodilova; Hanna Karnaushenko	Soviet Union
5	Tricia Smith; Betty Craig	Canada
6	Marlena Predescu-Zagoni; Marinela Maxim	Romania
7	Sue Morgan; Laura Staines	United States
8	Anna Krzemińska-Karbowiak; Małgorzata Kawalska	Poland
9	Oldřiška Pěkná; Zdena Tichá	Czechoslovakia
10	Lin Clark; Beryl Mitchell	Great Britain
11	Katalin Pál-Ribáry; Judit Kéri-Novák	Hungary
