= Ursula Unger =

East German rower

Personal information
- Born: 25 October 1953 (age 72)

Sport
- Sport: Rowing
- Club: SG Dynamo Potsdam
Medal record
Women's rowing
Representing East Germany
World Rowing Championships
Gold medal – first place	1974 Lucerne	Coxed quad sculls
Gold medal – first place	1975 Nottingham	Coxed quad sculls
European Rowing Championships
Gold medal – first place	1973 Moscow	Coxed quad sculls

Ursula Unger (née Wagner, later Maek, born 25 October 1953) is a rower who competed for East Germany during the 1970s.

Under her maiden name, she became East German national champion with the coxed quad scull in 1973. She also competed in the double scull at the nationals alongside her SG Dynamo Potsdam team mate Roswietha Reichel and they came second. The championship title qualified the quad scull team for the 1973 European Rowing Championships where they won gold. For women, the European Championships were the top rowing event to win until 1973 as women's rowing was not introduced to world championships in 1974 or Olympic Games in 1976. For their sporting success, the gold medallists were all given an award in January 1974; Wagner was given a Master of Sport award. At the 1974 national championships, Wagner's quad scull abandoned the race (the sources do not give the background) but they were nominated for the 1974 World Rowing Championships regardless. They were successful and were one of four East German teams to take out inaugural world championship titles for female rowers. In November 1974, the world champions were awarded a Patriotic Order of Merit in bronze (third class); Unger was listed under her married name.

For the 1975 rowing season, Sybille Tietze was replaced by Anke Grünberg but the other members of the coxed quad scull team remained. The team won the national championships and then defended their world championship title at the 1975 World Rowing Championships in Nottingham, Great Britain.
