= Rowing at the 1976 Summer Olympics – Women's double sculls =

Olympic rowing event

Women's double sculls at the Games of the XXI Olympiad
- Date: 19–24 July 1976
- Competitors: 20 from 10 nations

Medalists
1st place, gold medalist(s)		Svetla Otsetova; Zdravka Yordanova	Bulgaria
2nd place, silver medalist(s)		Sabine Jahn; Petra Boesler	East Germany
3rd place, bronze medalist(s)		Eleonora Kaminskaitė; Genovaitė Ramoškienė	Soviet Union

The women's double sculls competition at the 1976 Summer Olympics took place at Notre Dame Island Olympic Basin, Canada. It was the first time the event was contested for women.

== Competition format ==
The competition consisted of two main rounds (heats and finals) as well as a repechage. The 10 boats were divided into two heats for the first round, with 5 boats in each heat. The winner of each heat advanced directly to the "A" final (1st through 6th place). The remaining 8 boats were placed in the repechage. Two heats were held in the repechage, with 4 boats in each heat. The top two boats in each heat of the repechage went to the "A" final as well. The remaining 4 boats (3rd and 4th placers in the repechage heats) competed in the "B" final for 7th through 10th place.

All races were over a 1000 metre course.

== Results ==
=== Heats ===
==== Heat 1 ====
Rank	Rowers	Nation	Time	Notes
1	Eleonora Kaminskaitė; Genovaitė Ramoškienė	Soviet Union	3:21.75	QA
2	Petra Boesler; Sabine Jahn	East Germany	3:22.35	R
3	Ingun Brechan; Solfrid Johansen	Norway	3:29.54	R
4	Bev Cameron; Cheryl Howard	Canada	3:31.88	R
5	Diane Braceland; Jan Palchikoff	United States	3:33.15	R

==== Heat 2 ====
Rank	Rowers	Nation	Time	Notes
1	Svetla Otsetova; Zdravka Yordanova	Bulgaria	3:25.05	QA
2	Helie Klaasse; Andrea Vissers	Netherlands	3:31.17	R
3	Josiane Rabiller; Françoise Wittington	France	3:31.38	R
4	Miluše Neffeová; Zuzana Prokešová	Czechoslovakia	3:33.98	R
5	Maria Leibetseder; Renate Sigl	Austria	3:40.09	R

=== Repechage ===
==== Repechage heat 1 ====
Rank	Rowers	Nation	Time	Notes
1	Petra Boesler; Sabine Jahn	East Germany	3:34.99	QA
2	Bev Cameron; Cheryl Howard	Canada	3:42.73	QA
3	Josiane Rabiller; Françoise Wittington	France	3:43.00	QB
4	Maria Leibetseder; Renate Sigl	Austria	3:52.93	QB

==== Repechage heat 2 ====
Rank	Rowers	Nation	Time	Notes
1	Ingun Brechan; Solfrid Johansen	Norway	3:44.02	QA
2	Diane Braceland; Jan Palchikoff	United States	3:45.19	QA
3	Helie Klaasse; Andrea Vissers	Netherlands	3:47.80	QB
4	Miluše Neffeová; Zuzana Prokešová	Czechoslovakia	3:49.39	QB

=== Finals ===
==== Final B ====
Rank	Rowers	Nation	Time
7	Helie Klaasse; Andrea Vissers	Netherlands	4:03.37
8	Miluše Neffeová; Zuzana Prokešová	Czechoslovakia	4:03.66
9	Josiane Rabiller; Françoise Wittington	France	4:05.16
10	Maria Leibetseder; Renate Sigl	Austria	4:11.38

==== Final A ====
Rank	Rowers	Nation	Time
1st place, gold medalist(s)	Svetla Otsetova; Zdravka Yordanova	Bulgaria	3:44.36
2nd place, silver medalist(s)	Petra Boesler; Sabine Jahn	East Germany	3:47.86
3rd place, bronze medalist(s)	Eleonora Kaminskaitė; Genovaitė Ramoškienė	Soviet Union	3:49.93
4	Ingun Brechan; Solfrid Johansen	Norway	3:52.18
5	Diane Braceland; Jan Palchikoff	United States	3:58.25
6	Bev Cameron; Cheryl Howard	Canada	4:06.23

== Final classification ==
Rank	Rowers	Country
1st place, gold medalist(s)	Svetla Otsetova; Zdravka Yordanova	Bulgaria
2nd place, silver medalist(s)	Sabine Jahn; Petra Boesler	East Germany
3rd place, bronze medalist(s)	Eleonora Kaminskaitė; Genovaitė Ramoškienė	Soviet Union
4	Solfrid Johansen; Ingun Brechan	Norway
5	Jan Palchikoff; Diane Braceland	United States
6	Cheryl Howard; Bev Cameron	Canada
7	Andrea Vissers; Helie Klaasse	Netherlands
8	Miluše Neffeová; Zuzana Prokešová	Czechoslovakia
9	Josiane Rabiller; Françoise Wittington	France
10	Renate Sigl; Maria Leibetseder	Austria
