= Vasilchenko =

Vasilchenko (Ukrainian: Васильченко; Belarusian: Васільчанка) is a Ukrainian surname, derived from Vasily, the Ukrainian equivalent of the given name Basil. Notable people with the surname include:

- Alexei Vasilchenko (born 1981), Kazakhstani ice hockey player
- Georgy Vasilchenko (1921–2006), Russian sexologist
- Liliya Vasilchenko (born 1962), Soviet cross-country skier
- Olga Vasilchenko (born 1956), Russian rower
- Yury Vasilchanka (born 1994), Belarusian hammer thrower
