= Niedermeier =

Niedermeier is a German surname. The name was initially used as a distinguishing name for a farmer (Meier) who had a farm lower (nieder) than the neighboring one(s). Variants are Niedermaier, Niedermair, Niedermayer, Niedermayr, Niedermeier, Niedermeir, Niedermeyer and Niedermeyr. These names are common to Austria and Bavaria.

Notable people with the surname Niedermaier include:

- Antonia Niedermaier, German cyclist
- Judy Niedermaier (1937–2011), American designer
- Tobias Niedermaier (*1989), German epidemiologist

Notable people with the surname Niedermeier include:

- Georg Niedermeier, German footballer

Notable people with the surname Niedermayer include:

- Inge Niedermayer, Austrian rower
- Kurt Niedermayer, German footballer
- Luděk Niedermayer, Czech politician and economist
- Oskar von Niedermayer (1885–1948) German general, professor and adventurer
- Rob Niedermayer (born 1974), Canadian ice hockey player (brother of Scott)
- Scott Niedermayer (born 1973), Canadian ice hockey player (brother of Rob)
- Thomas Niedermayer, German industrialist kidnapped and killed by the Provisional IRA

Notable people with the surname Niedermeyer include:

- Brian Niedermeyer (born 1988), American football coach
- Helmut Niedermeyer (1926–2014), Austrian businessman
- Louis Niedermeyer (1802–1861), Swiss-born French composer

Notable people with the surname Niedermayr include:

- Gerhard Niedermayr, see Niedermayrite mineral
- Helmut Niedermayr (1915–1985), Formula One driver

Notable people with the surname Niedermair include:

- John Niedermair (1893–1982), naval architect
- Roland Niedermair, luger

== See also ==
- Neidermayer's Mind, a demo by alternative metal band Korn
- Niedermayer–Hentig Expedition
- Douglas C. Niedermeyer, villain of Animal House
