= Nonie =

Nonie may refer to:

- 2382 Nonie, a main-belt asteroid
- Nonie Buencamino (born 1966), a Filipino actor
- Nonie Darwish (born 1949), an Egyptian-American human rights activist
- Nonie Lynch (born Nonie Crawford; 1910–2011), an Irish traditional singer
- Nonie May Stewart – American-born member of the Greek royal family (1878–1923) (1878-1923), a wealthy American heiress who became Princess Anastasia of Greece and Denmark
- Nonie Ray – British rower
- Ruth Winona Tao (a.k.a. Nonie Tao, born 1963), an American-born Chinese film actress
- Shirley Wanda Nonie Huie – Australian writer
