= Barták =

Barták (feminine: Bartáková) is a Czech surname, derived from the given name Bartoloměj (Czech variant of Bartholomew). Notable people with the surname include:

- Jan Barták, Czech figure skater
- Lambert Bartak (1919–2013), American organist
- Lenka Bartáková (born 1991), Czech basketball player
- Marie Bartáková (born 1948), Slovak rower
- Martin Barták (born 1967), Czech politician
