= Kirsten Jensen =

Kirsten Jensen can refer to:

- Kirsten Hedegaard Jensen (born 1935), Danish Olympic swimmer
- Kirsten Plum Jensen (born 1961), Danish Olympic rower
- Kirsten Jensen (curler) (born 1952), Danish curler and coach
- Kirsten Jensen (politician), Member of the European Parliament for Denmark
- Kirsten Marie Ørnsbjerg Jensen, recognized as a 2019 International Rising Talent of the L'Oréal-UNESCO For Women in Science programme
