= Donkervoort (surname) =

Donkervoort is a Dutch surname. Notable people with the surname include:

- Denis Donkervoort (born 1988), Dutch racing driver
- Ineke Donkervoort (born 1953), Dutch sports administrator
- Joop Donkervoort (born 1949, Dutch businessman
