= Roswietha Zobelt =

German rower (born 1954)

Personal information
- Born: Roswietha Reichel; 24 November 1954 (age 71) Rittersgrün, East Germany
- Height: 188 cm (6 ft 2 in)
- Weight: 83 kg (183 lb)

Sport
- Sport: Rowing
- Club: SG Dynamo Potsdam
Medal record
Women's rowing
Representing East Germany
Olympic Games
Gold medal – first place	1976 Montreal	Coxed quad sculls
Gold medal – first place	1980 Moscow	Coxed quad sculls
World Rowing Championships
Gold medal – first place	1974 Lucerne	Coxed quad sculls
Gold medal – first place	1975 Nottingham	Coxed quad sculls
Gold medal – first place	1977 Amsterdam	Double sculls
Gold medal – first place	1979 Bled	Coxed quad sculls
European Rowing Championships
Gold medal – first place	1973 Moscow	Coxed quad sculls

Roswietha Zobelt (née Reichel, born 24 November 1954) is a German rower who competed for East Germany in the 1976 Summer Olympics and in the 1980 Summer Olympics.

== Early life ==
She was born in Rittersgrün in 1954. She grew up around athletics as a summer sport and skiing in winter. In Johanngeorgenstadt, one of the towns of her native Erzgebirgskreis district, she was spotted by rowing coaches who were impressed by her physical appearance; In 1970 she stood 6 ft 2in tall, and they convinced Zolbelt to move to near the Beetzsee to take up rowing. She did so that year without ever having sat in a rowing boat before.

== Rowing career ==
Trained by Barbara Müller, she came second in the coxed quad scull at the 1972 East German national championships. A month later, she won gold with the quad scull and the eight at the fourth Spartakiad. At the 1973 East German national championships she won the title in the coxed quad scull. She also competed in the double scull at the nationals alongside her SG Dynamo Potsdam team mate Ursula Wagner and they came second. The championship title qualified the quad scull team for the 1973 European Rowing Championships where they won gold. For women, the European Championships were the top rowing event to win until 1973 as women's rowing was not introduced to world championships in 1974 or Olympic Games in 1976. For their sporting success, the gold medallists were all given an award in January 1974; Reichel was given a Master of Sport award. At the 1974 national championships, Reichel's quad scull abandoned the race (the sources do not give the background) but they were nominated for the 1974 World Rowing Championships regardless. They were successful and were one of four East German teams to take out inaugural world championship titles for female rowers. In November 1974, the world champions were awarded a Patriotic Order of Merit in bronze (third class); Unger was listed under her married name.

From the 1975 season, she competed under her married name Zobelt after marrying the rower Gunter Zobelt. Sybille Tietze was replaced by Anke Grünberg but the other members of the coxed quad scull team remained. The team won the national championships and then defended their world championship title at the 1975 World Rowing Championships in Nottingham, Great Britain.

In 1976, Zobelt was a crew member of the East German boat which won the gold medal in the quadruple sculls event. Four years later she won her second gold medal with the East German boat in the 1980 quadruple sculls competition.
