= Lenes =

Lenes is a surname. Notable people with the surname include:

- Haldis Lenes (born 1957), Norwegian rower
- Peter Lenes (born 1986), American ice hockey player
