= Huiberdina =

Huiberdina is a Dutch given name. Notable people with the name include:

- Huiberdina Donkervoort (born 1953), Dutch sports administrator and former Olympic rower
- Huiberdina Krul (1922–1994), Dutch Olympic artistic gymnast
