= Gyimesi =

Gyimesi is a surname. Notable people with the surname include:

- Endre Gyimesi, Hungarian historian and politician
- György Gyimesi, Slovak politician
- László Gyimesi (footballer) (born 1957), Hungarian football midfielder
- László Gyimesi (pianist), Hungarian pianist
- Valéria Gyimesi (born 1955), Hungarian rower
- Zoltan Gyimesi, Hungarian chess grandmaster
