= Sally Bloomfield (rower) =

British rower

Personal information
- Nationality: British
- Born: 3 June 1956; London, England
- Died: 5 January 1985 (aged 28); Auxerre, France

Sport
- Sport: Rowing
- Club: Tideway Scullers School

Sarah Sally Bloomfield (3 June 1956 – 5 January 1985) was a former British rower who competed at the 1984 Summer Olympics.

== Rowing career ==
Bloomfield was part of the eight, that won the national title rowing for Great Britain senior squad boat, at the 1981 National Championships. This led to selection for the 1981 World Rowing Championships in Munich. The following year she was part of the eight that won the national title, rowing for an A.R.A squad, at the 1982 National Rowing Championships. Subsequently she went to her second World Championships, rowing at the 1982 World Rowing Championships in Lucerne.

In 1984 she was selected to represent Great Britain in the women's double sculls event at the 1980 Olympics in Moscow. With her rowing partner Nonie Ray the pair finished in eighth place after being eliminated in the repechage.

== Personal life ==
She was killed in a car crash in France, at Auxerre, on Saturday 5 January 1985, aged 28, with 38 year old Olympic rowing coach Graeme Hall.

They were driving back from a skiing holiday in France, when their car hit a lorry.
