= Elizabeth Hills =

Elizabeth Hills may refer to:

- Elizabeth Hills, New South Wales, a suburb of Sydney, Australia
- Liz Hills (born 1954), American rower
