= Else Mærsk-Kristensen =

Danish rower (born 1952)

Personal information
- Nationality: Danish
- Born: 2 December 1952 (age 73)

Sport
- Sport: Rowing

Else Mærsk-Kristensen (born 2 December 1952) is a Danish rower. She competed in the women's quadruple sculls event at the 1976 Summer Olympics.
