= Françoise Wittington =

French rower

Personal information
- Nationality: French
- Born: 7 September 1953 (age 71)

Sport
- Sport: Rowing

Françoise Wittington (born 7 September 1953) is a French rower. She competed in the women's double sculls event at the 1976 Summer Olympics.
