= Hana Kavková =

Czech rower (born 1952)

Personal information
- Nationality: Czech
- Born: 25 May 1952 (age 72); Prague, Czechoslovakia

Sport
- Sport: Rowing

Hana Kavková (born 25 May 1952) is a Czech rower. She competed in the women's quadruple sculls event at the 1976 Summer Olympics.
