= Renate Sigl =

Austrian rower

Personal information
- Nationality: Austrian
- Born: 18 February 1950 (age 75); Linz, Austria

Sport
- Sport: Rowing

Renate Sigl (born 18 February 1950) is an Austrian rower. She competed in the women's double sculls event at the 1976 Summer Olympics.
