= Mariana Zaharia =

Romanian rower

Personal information
- Nationality: Romanian
- Born: 4 September 1957 (age 67)

Sport
- Sport: Rowing

Mariana Zaharia (born 4 September 1957) is a Romanian rower. She competed in the women's quadruple sculls event at the 1980 Summer Olympics.
