= Troyanka Vasileva =

Bulgarian rower

Personal information
- Nationality: Bulgarian
- Born: 14 December 1942 (age 82)

Sport
- Sport: Rowing

Troyanka Vasileva (Bulgarian: Троянка Василева; born 14 December 1942) is a Bulgarian rower. She competed in the women's quadruple sculls event at the 1976 Summer Olympics.
