= Anka Georgieva =

Bulgarian rowing cox (born 1959)

Personal information
- Born: Ani Georgieva; 18 May 1959 (age 67) Varna, Bulgaria

Sport
- Sport: Rowing
Medal record
Women's rowing
Representing Bulgaria
Olympic Games
Bronze medal – third place	1980 Moscow	Coxed quad scull
World Rowing Championships
Gold medal – first place	1978 Karapiro	Coxed quad scull

Ani "Anka" Eftimova-Georgieva (Bulgarian: Ани "Анка" Георгиева; born 18 May 1959 in Varna) is a Bulgarian rowing coxswain who competed in the 1980 Summer Olympics.
