= Josiane Rabiller =

French rower

Personal information
- Nationality: French
- Born: 9 October 1950 (age 74)

Sport
- Sport: Rowing

Josiane Rabiller (born 9 October 1950) is a French rower. She competed in the women's double sculls event at the 1976 Summer Olympics.
