= Anka Bakova =

Bulgarian rower (born 1957)

Personal information
- Born: Ani Stoyanova Bakova; 22 February 1957 (age 69) Perushtitsa, Bulgaria
- Height: 175 cm (5 ft 9 in)
- Weight: 75 kg (165 lb)

Sport
- Sport: Rowing
Medal record
Women's rowing
Representing Bulgaria
Olympic Games
Bronze medal – third place	1980 Moscow	Coxed quad sculls
World Rowing Championships
Bronze medal – third place	1977 Amsterdam	Coxed quad scull
Gold medal – first place	1978 Karapiro	Coxed quad scull
Silver medal – second place	1979 Bled	Coxed quad scull
Bronze medal – third place	1981 Munich	Double scull

Ani Stoyanova "Anka" Bakova (Bulgarian: Ани Стоянова "Анка" Бакова; born 22 February 1957 in Perushtitsa) is a Bulgarian former rower who competed in the 1980 Summer Olympics.
