= Janina Klucznik =

Polish rower (born 1954)

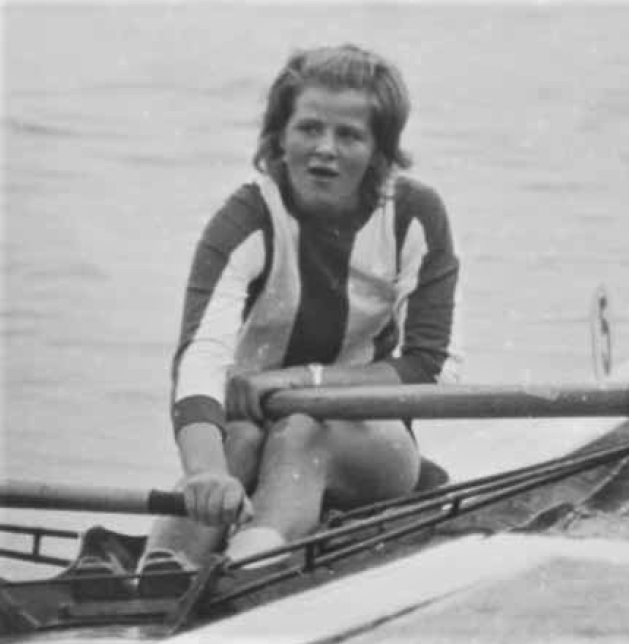
- Janina Klucznik (c. 1970)

Personal information
- Nationality: Polish
- Born: 18 June 1954 (age 71) Ostrzeszewo, Poland

Sport
- Sport: Rowing

Janina Klucznik (born 18 June 1954) is a Polish rower. She competed in the women's double sculls event at the 1980 Summer Olympics.
