= Felicia Afrăsiloaie =

Romanian rower (born 1954)

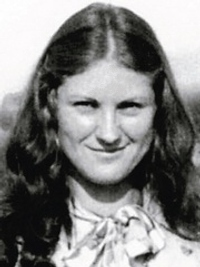

Personal information
- Born: 16 January 1954 (age 72) Piatra Neamţ, Romania
- Height: 178 cm (5 ft 10 in)
- Weight: 70 kg (154 lb)

Sport
- Sport: Rowing
Medal record
Representing Romania
Olympic Games
Bronze medal – third place	1976 Montreal	Quadruple sculls
World Rowing Championships
Silver medal – second place	1977 Amsterdam	Quadruple sculls

Felicia Afrăsiloaie-Jitianu (born 16 January 1954) is a retired Romanian rower. Competing in quadruple sculls she won a bronze medal at the 1976 Olympics followed by a silver at the 1977 World Championships. She retired in 1978 after a car accident.
