= Lisa Hansen (rower) =

American rower

Personal information
- Born: July 8, 1954 (age 70); Oakland, California, United States

Sport
- Sport: Rowing

Lisa Hansen (born July 8, 1954) is an American rower. She competed in the women's quadruple sculls event at the 1976 Summer Olympics.

Her daughter, Genevra Stone, was also an Olympic rower.
