= Sabine Dähne =

East German rower

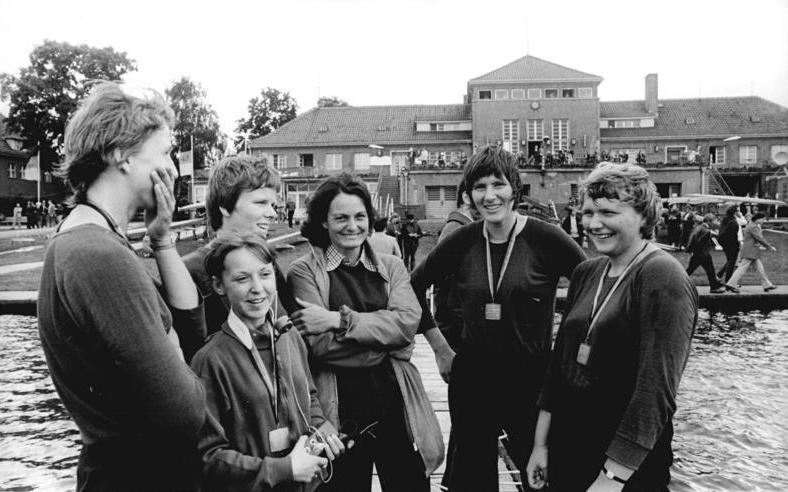
- Sabine Dähne (second from left) in 1974

Personal information
- Born: 27 February 1950 (age 76) Colditz, East Germany

Sport
- Sport: Rowing
Medal record
Women's rowing
Representing East Germany
Olympic Games
Silver medal – second place	1976 Montreal	Coxless pair
World Rowing Championships
Gold medal – first place	1974 Lucerne	Coxed four
Gold medal – first place	1975 Nottingham	Coxless pair
Gold medal – first place	1977 Amsterdam	Coxless pair
European Rowing Championships
Silver medal – second place	1969 Klagenfurt	Coxed four
Silver medal – second place	1972 Brandenburg	Coxed four
Silver medal – second place	1973 Moscow	Coxed four
Bronze medal – third place	1970 Tata	Coxed quad scull

Sabine Dähne (born 27 February 1950) is a German rower who competed for East Germany in the 1976 Summer Olympics.

She was born in Colditz. In 1976 she and her partner Angelika Noack won the silver medal in the coxless pair event.
