= Judith Andersen =

Danish rower (born 1951)

Personal information
- Nationality: Danish
- Born: 16 November 1951 (age 73); Copenhagen, Denmark

Sport
- Sport: Rowing

Judith Solveig Seitzberg Andersen-Lyster (born 16 November 1951) is a Danish rower. She competed in the women's quadruple sculls event at the 1976 Summer Olympics.
