= Miluše Neffeová =

Czech rower (born 1950)

Personal information
- Nationality: Czech
- Born: 18 September 1950 (age 74); Ústí nad Labem, Czechoslovakia

Sport
- Sport: Rowing

Miluše Neffeová (born 18 September 1950) is a Czech rower. She competed in the women's double sculls event at the 1976 Summer Olympics.
