= Irene Moreno =

American rower

Personal information
- Born: November 23, 1952 (age 72); Huntington Park, California, United States

Sport
- Sport: Rowing

Irene Moreno (born November 23, 1952) is an American rower. She competed in the women's quadruple sculls event at the 1976 Summer Olympics.
