= Hanna Jarkiewicz =

Polish rower

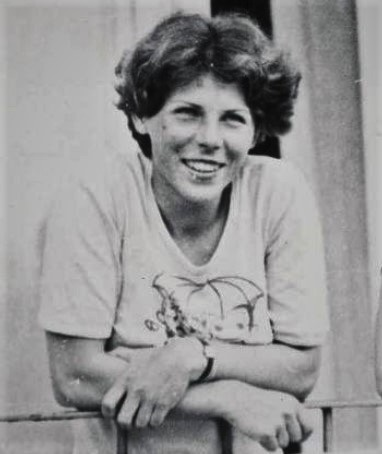
- Jarkiewicz in 1977

Personal information
- Nationality: Polish
- Born: 31 August 1954 (age 70); Wrocław, Poland

Sport
- Sport: Rowing

Hanna Jarkiewicz (born 31 August 1954) is a Polish rower. She competed in the women's double sculls event at the 1980 Summer Olympics.
