= Małgorzata Kawalska =

Polish rower

Personal information
- Full name: Małgorzata Helena Kawalska
- Born: 18 February 1952 (age 74) Łódź, Poland
- Height: 177 cm (5 ft 10 in)
- Weight: 74 kg (163 lb)

Sport
- Country: Poland
- Sport: Rowing
- Club: AZS Warszawa
Medal record
Women's rowing
Representing Poland
European Championships
Bronze medal – third place	1973 Moscow	Coxed four

Małgorzata Helena Kawalska (later Gryczuk and Cieśliczka, born 18 February 1952) is a Polish rower. She competed in the women's coxless pair event at the 1976 Summer Olympics.
