= Edith Eckbauer =

German rower

Personal information
- Born: 27 October 1949 (age 77) Munich

Sport
- Sport: Rowing
Medal record
Women's rowing
Representing West Germany
Olympic Games
Bronze medal – third place	1976 Montreal	Coxless pair
World Rowing Championships
Bronze medal – third place	1975 Nottingham	Coxed four
European Rowing Championships
Bronze medal – third place	1971 Copenhagen	Single sculls
Bronze medal – third place	1973 Moscow	Single sculls

Edith Eckbauer (later Edith Baumann; born 27 October 1949) is a German rower who competed for West Germany in the 1976 Summer Olympics.

Eckbauer was born in 1949 in Munich. In 1976 she and her partner Thea Einöder won the bronze medal in the coxless pair event.
