= Tudoran =

Tudoran is a family name common in Romania.

- Dorin Tudoran, poet, journalist
- Ioana Tudoran, canoer
- Lavinia Tudoran, journalist
- Radu Tudoran, novelist
- Ana Alina Tudoran, professor
