= Claudia Schneider =

American rower

Personal information
- Nationality: American
- Born: September 16, 1951 (age 75) Langendernbach, Germany

Sport
- Sport: Rowing

Claudia Schneider (born September 16, 1951) is an American former rower. She competed in the women's quadruple sculls event at the 1976 Summer Olympics.
