= Marie Carlsson =

Swedish rower

Personal information
- Nationality: Swedish
- Born: 15 February 1958 (age 67); Gothenburg, Sweden

Sport
- Sport: Rowing

Marie Carlsson (born 15 February 1958) is a Swedish rower. She competed in the women's double sculls event at the 1984 Summer Olympics.
