= Thea Einöder =

German rower

Personal information
- Born: 8 June 1951 (age 75) Regensburg
- Height: 177 cm (5 ft 10 in)
- Weight: 66 kg (146 lb)

Sport
- Sport: Rowing
- Club: Rudergemeinschaft München
Medal record
Women's rowing
Representing West Germany
Olympic Games
Bronze medal – third place	1976 Montreal	Coxless pair
World Rowing Championships
Bronze medal – third place	1975 Nottingham	Coxed four

Thea Einöder (later Dr. Thea Straube, born 8 June 1951) is a German rower who competed for West Germany in the 1976 Summer Olympics.

Einöder was born in Regensburg in 1951. In 1976 she and her partner Edith Eckbauer won the bronze medal in the coxless pair event.
