= Maria Leibetseder =

Austrian rower

Personal information
- Nationality: Austrian
- Born: 16 December 1959 (age 65); Linz, Austria

Sport
- Sport: Rowing

Maria Leibetseder (born 16 December 1959) is an Austrian rower. She competed in the women's double sculls event at the 1976 Summer Olympics.
