= Karen Margrethe Nielsen =

Danish rower

Personal information
- Nationality: Danish
- Born: 13 February 1951 (age 74); Fredericia, Denmark

Sport
- Sport: Rowing

Karen Margrethe Nielsen (born 13 February 1951) is a Danish rower. She competed in the women's quadruple sculls event at the 1976 Summer Olympics.
