= Sue Morgan (rower) =

American rower

Personal information
- Nationality: American
- Born: September 27, 1952 (age 72); Port Townsend, Washington, United States

Sport
- Sport: Rowing

Sue Morgan (born September 27, 1952) is an American rower. She competed in the women's coxless pair event at the 1976 Summer Olympics.
