= Nataliya Horodilova =

Soviet rower

Personal information
- Nationality: Ukrainian
- Born: 16 May 1950 (age 75) Dzaudzhikau, Soviet Union

Sport
- Sport: Rowing

Nataliya Horodilova (born 16 May 1950) is a Ukrainian rower. She competed in the women's coxless pair event at the 1976 Summer Olympics.
