= Klára Langhoffer-Pétervári =

Hungarian rower

Personal information
- Nationality: Hungarian
- Born: 31 August 1955 (age 69); Budapest, Hungary

Sport
- Sport: Rowing

Klára Langhoffer-Pétervári (born 31 August 1955) is a Hungarian rower. She competed in the women's double sculls event at the 1980 Summer Olympics.
