= Stoyanka Kurbatova =

Bulgarian rower (born 1955)

Medal record

Women's rowing

Representing Bulgaria

Olympic Games
Gold medal – first place	1976 Montreal	Coxless pair
Bronze medal – third place	1980 Moscow	Coxless pair

Stoyanka Kurbatova (née Gruycheva, Bulgarian: Стоянка Курбатова, née Груйчева, born 18 March 1955) is a Bulgarian rower and Olympic champion.

She was born in Plovdiv.

Kurbatova, competing under her maiden name Gruycheva, became Olympic champion in 1976 in the coxless pairs event, with Siyka Kelbecheva. In 1980, she received a bronze medal in the same competition.
