= Siyka Kelbecheva =

Bulgarian rower (born 1951)

Medal record

Women's rowing

Representing Bulgaria

Olympic Games
Gold medal – first place	1976 Montreal	Coxless pair
Bronze medal – third place	1980 Moscow	Coxless pair

Siyka Kelbecheva (Bulgarian: Сийка Келбечева, born 1 December 1951) is a Bulgarian rower and Olympic champion.

She became Olympic champion in 1976 in the coxless pair, with Stoyanka Kurbatova-Gruicheva. She received a bronze medal in 1980.
