= Mariana Serbezova =

Bulgarian rower (born 1959)

Medal record

Women's rowing

Representing Bulgaria

Olympic Games
Bronze medal – third place	1980 Moscow	Coxed quad sculls

World Rowing Championships
Silver medal – second place	1979 Bled	Coxed quad sculls

Mariana Rogelova Serbezova (Bulgarian: Марияна Рогелова Сербезова; born 15 November 1959) is a Bulgarian former rower.

Serbezova was born in Plovdiv. She started rowing in 1972, and trained with coach Mlika Kuleva. She won a bronze medal in the coxed quadruple sculls event at the 1980 Summer Olympics. She also won a silver medal in the same event at the 1979 World Rowing Championships.

She retired from competition in 1991, and worked as a physical education teacher in Sofia. In 2019, she was awarded the "Sport for a Peaceful World" medal by the Bulgarian Olympic Committee.
