= Jutta Ploch =

East German rower

Medal record

Women's rowing

Representing East Germany

Olympic Games
Gold medal – first place	1980 Moscow	Coxed quad sculls

World Rowing Championships
Gold medal – first place	1983 Duisburg	Double sculls
Silver medal – second place	1981 Munich	Coxed quad sculls
Silver medal – second place	1982 Lucerne	Coxed quad sculls

Jutta Ploch (born 13 January 1960 in Weißenfels) is a German rower. From 1983, she competed under her married name Jutta Schenk.
