= Helie Klaasse =

Dutch rower

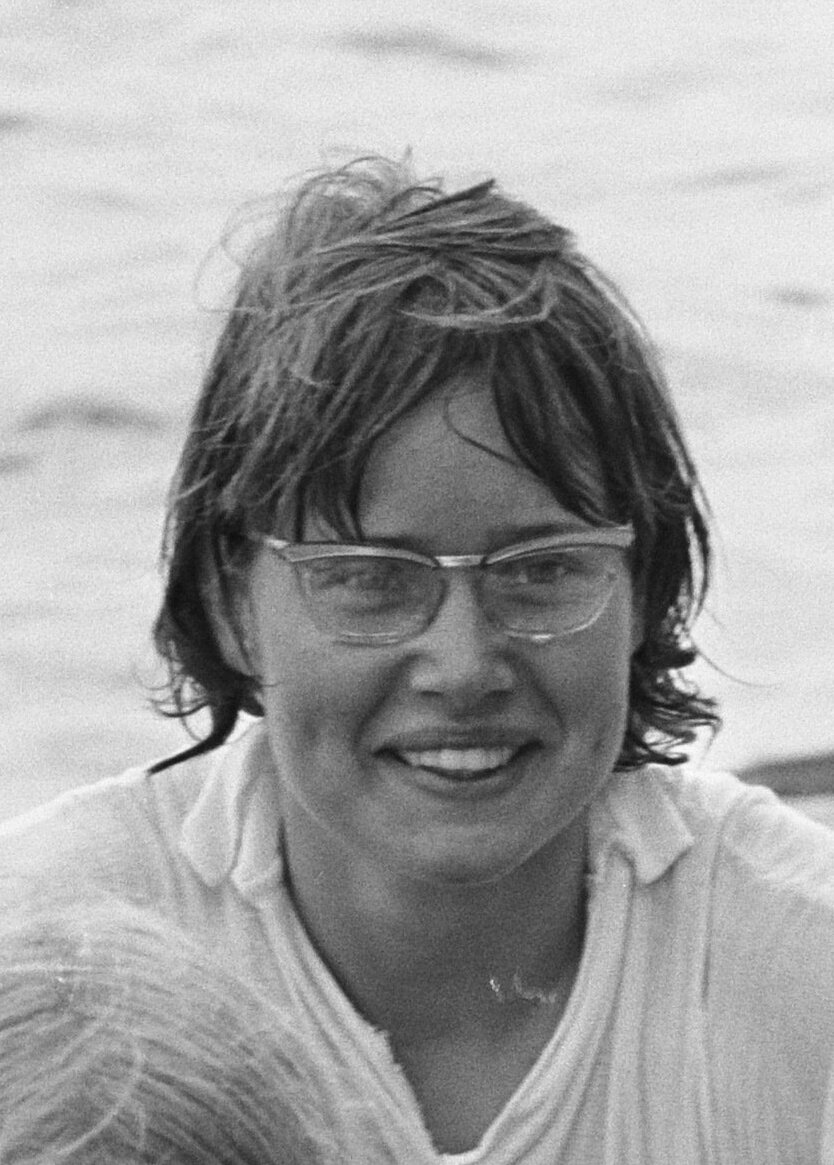
- Klaasse (1969)

Personal information
- Nationality: Dutch
- Born: 14 December 1949 (age 75); Amsterdam, Netherlands

Sport
- Sport: Rowing

Helie Klaasse (born 14 December 1949) is a Dutch rower. She competed in the women's double sculls event at the 1976 Summer Olympics.
