= Olga Homeghi =

Romanian rower (born 1958)

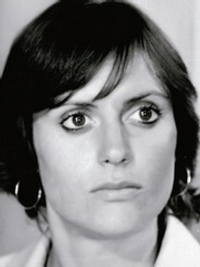

Personal information
- Born: 1 May 1958 (age 68) Fieni, Romania
- Height: 174 cm (5 ft 9 in)
- Weight: 73 kg (161 lb)

Sport
- Sport: Rowing
- Club: CS Dinamo București
Medal record
Representing Romania
Olympic Games
Bronze medal – third place	1980 Moscow	Double sculls
Gold medal – first place	1984 Los Angeles	Coxed four
Gold medal – first place	1988 Seoul	Coxless pair
Silver medal – second place	1988 Seoul	Eight
World Championships
Bronze medal – third place	1979 Bled	Double sculls
Bronze medal – third place	1981 Munich	Quadruple sculls
Silver medal – second place	1983 Duisburg	Coxed four
Silver medal – second place	1985 Hazewinkel	Coxed four
Gold medal – first place	1986 Nottingham	Coxless pair
Gold medal – first place	1987 Copenhagen	Coxless pair
Gold medal – first place	1987 Copenhagen	Eight

Olga Homeghi (later Bularda and then Ioniță, born 1 May 1958) is a retired Romanian rower. She competed at the 1980, 1984, and 1988 Olympics and won two gold, one silver and one bronze medal, each in different events. At the world championships she won three gold, two silver, and two bronze medals between 1979 and 1987.
