= Anna Krzemińska-Karbowiak =

Polish rower

Personal information
- Full name: Anna Jadwiga Krzemińska-Karbowiak
- Born: 1 June 1950 (age 76) Grójec, Poland
- Height: 168 cm (5 ft 6 in)
- Weight: 65 kg (143 lb)

Sport
- Country: Poland
- Sport: Rowing
- Club: AZS Warszawa
Medal record
Women's rowing
Representing Poland
European Championships
Bronze medal – third place	1973 Moscow	Coxed four

Anna Jadwiga Karbowiak (née Krzemińska, born 1 June 1950) is a Polish rower. She competed in the women's coxless pair event at the 1976 Summer Olympics.
