= Diane Braceland =

American rower

Personal information
- Born: January 27, 1950 (age 75); Philadelphia, Pennsylvania, United States

Sport
- Sport: Rowing

Diane Braceland (born January 27, 1950) is an American rower. She competed in the women's double sculls event at the 1976 Summer Olympics.
