= Bev Cameron =

Canadian rower

Personal information
- Born: 17 June 1953 (age 72) Ottawa, Ontario, Canada

Sport
- Sport: Rowing

Bev Cameron (born 17 June 1953) is a Canadian rower. She competed in the women's double sculls event at the 1976 Summer Olympics.
