= Jutta Lau =

East German rower

Personal information
- Born: 28 September 1955 (age 70) Wustermark, East Germany
- Education: Deutsche Hochschule für Körperkultur (DHfK)
- Height: 175 cm (5 ft 9 in)
- Weight: 65 kg (143 lb)

Sport
- Sport: Rowing
- Club: SG Dynamo Potsdam / Sportvereinigung (SV) Dynamo
Medal record
Women's rowing
Representing East Germany
Olympic Games
Gold medal – first place	1976 Montreal	Coxed quad sculls
Gold medal – first place	1980 Moscow	Coxed quad sculls
World Rowing Championships
Gold medal – first place	1974 Lucerne	Coxed quad sculls
Gold medal – first place	1975 Nottingham	Coxed quad sculls
Gold medal – first place	1979 Bled	Coxed quad sculls

Jutta Lau (born 28 September 1955 in Wustermark) is a German rower, who competed for the SG Dynamo Potsdam / Sportvereinigung (SV) Dynamo. She won the medals at the international rowing competitions.

She retired from competitive rowing after the 1980 Summer Olympics and from September 1980, she worked as a rowing coach in Potsdam. She graduated with a diploma in physical education from the Deutsche Hochschule für Körperkultur (DHfK) in Leipzig in 1981. She later became the sculls trainer for the national women's team. She was thus responsible for preparing the sculls team for the 1996 Summer Olympics in Atlanta, USA. Classification earlier in the year determined that Kathrin Boron was the strongest sculler, followed by Jana Thieme, Katrin Rutschow, and Kerstin Köppen. Guided by the principle that the strongest sculler should row in the singles, her preference was for Boron, but Boron preferred to row in the double or quad. Lau thus nominated Thieme for the single, Koppen and Boron would make the double, and Koppen, Boron, Rutschow and Jana Sorgers were to make up the quad. Dr Ralf Kollmann, who as sports director was responsible for nominating the teams, rejected these teams and wanted rowers picked so that more clubs were represented. Germany's national rowing organisation (Deutscher Ruderverband) nominated Meike Evers for the single, and Thieme and Manuela Lutze, and for the quad the team recommended by Lau. Evers had come eighth or ninth in Lau's classification, and Lau predicted that Evers would not reach the A-final (she only made the C-final). Lau further predicted that the double would at best come fourth (they came fifth). Her final prediction was that the quad would win gold, which they did. By Lau's best assessment, had her suggested teams been accepted, all three boats would probably have won medals. After the Atlanta Olympics, she accused Kollmann of incompetence.
