= Helmut Niedermeyer =

Helmut Niedermeyer (28 February 1926 – 3 February 2014) was an Austrian businessman and entrepreneur. He founded Niedermeyer, which was once the largest consumer electronics chain in Austria.

== Biography ==
Niedermeyer was born in Opava in what is now the Czech Republic. His mother died shortly after his birth. His father, a successful cafe owner, was a political prisoner for seven years in a Nazi concentration camp. Helmut Niedermeyer was interned (a "war-volunteer") by the Soviets for five years and survived captivity in part thanks to being able to act in theater. After the war, the family moved to Vienna.

He began his career as a salesman in 1949. In 1957 he founded the company Niedermeyer AG as X-ray, photo and film products business. The company and its branches grew, and in the 1980s and 1990s became Niedermeyer-Konzem through various acquisitions. Niedermeyer retired from the board of the company in 1997. Two years later, it was sold to T-Mobile and changed ownership several times. It went bankrupt in 2013. He died on 3 February 2014 of a heart attack in Tenerife, Spain. He is survived by his daughter, Angelika, and a son, Christian.
