= Alena Svobodová =

Czech rower (born 1957)

Personal information
- Nationality: Czech
- Born: 19 July 1957 (age 67); Prague, Czechoslovakia

Sport
- Country: Czechoslovakia
- Sport: Rowing

Alena Svobodová (born 19 July 1957) is a Czech rower. She competed for Czechoslovakia in the women's quadruple sculls event at the 1976 Summer Olympics.
