= Larisa Popova =

Moldovan rower (born 1957)

Medal record

Women's rowing

Representing the Soviet Union

Olympic Games
| Gold medal – first place | 1980 Moscow | Double sculls |
| Silver medal – second place | 1976 Montreal | Coxed quad sculls |

Larisa Mikhaylovna Popova (née Aleksandrova; born 9 April 1957) is a Moldovan rower who competed for the Soviet Union in the 1976 Summer Olympics.

In 1976, she was a crew member of the Soviet boat, which won the silver medal in the quadruple sculls event.

Four years later, she and her partner Yelena Khloptseva won the gold medal in the 1980 double sculls competition.
