= Antonina Pustovit =

Ukrainian former rower (born 1955)

Medal record

Women's rowing

Representing the Soviet Union

Olympic Games
Silver medal – second place	1980 Moscow	Coxed quad sculls

Antonina Pustovit (born 16 October 1955) is a Ukrainian former rower who competed in the 1980 Summer Olympics.
