= Hanna Karnaushenko =

Ukrainian rower

Personal information
- Nationality: Ukrainian
- Born: 14 September 1953 (age 71); Kamianka-Dniprovska, Ukrainian SSR, Soviet Union

Sport
- Sport: Rowing

Hanna Karnaushenko (born 14 September 1953) is a Ukrainian rower. She competed in the women's coxless pair event at the 1976 Summer Olympics.
