= Heidi Westphal =

East German rower (born 1959)

Medal record

Women's rowing

Representing East Germany

Olympic Games
Silver medal – second place	1980 Moscow	Double sculls

World Rowing Championships
Gold medal – first place	1979 Bled	Double sculls
Silver medal – second place	1981 Munich	Coxed quad sculls
Silver medal – second place	1982 Lucerne	Coxed quad sculls

Heidi Westphal (born 5 July 1959) is a German rower and Olympic medalist. She won the silver medal in Double sculls with her partner Cornelia Linse in the 1980 Moscow Olympic Games. Westphal was born in Gnoien, Bezirk Neubrandenburg.
