= Jarmila Pátková =

Czech rower (born 1953)

Personal information
- Nationality: Czech
- Born: 9 June 1953 (age 71); Brno, Czechoslovakia

Sport
- Sport: Rowing

Jarmila Pátková (born 9 June 1953) is a Czech rower. She competed in the women's quadruple sculls event at the 1976 Summer Olympics.
