= Barbara Boettcher =

Canadian rower

Personal information
- Born: 2 June 1955 (age 70) Calgary, Alberta, Canada

Sport
- Sport: Rowing

Barbara Boettcher (born 2 June 1955) is a Canadian rower. She competed in the women's quadruple sculls event at the 1976 Summer Olympics.
