= Jan Palchikoff =

American rower and cyclist (born 1951)

Jan Palchikoff (born March 3, 1951) is a multi-sport athlete born in Culver City, California.

== Competition ==
She is a world-record holding cyclist in the master's division where she currently competes, and an Olympian who competed in the 1976 Summer Olympics in rowing—finishing fifth in double sculls. She qualified for the 1980 U.S. Olympic team but was unable to compete due to the 1980 Summer Olympics boycott. Palchikoff did however receive one of 461 Congressional Gold Medals created especially for the spurned athletes. She rowed for UCLA.

== Career ==
Palchikoff earned her master's degree in Sports Management from the University of Massachusetts and has served as head coach of Syracuse University Women's Crew from 1980 to 1982, and as an executive in a number of sports and athletics related organizations, including the 2015 Special Olympics World Summer Games, the 1994 FIFA World Cup, and the World Rowing Championships.

== Honors ==
Palchikoff was named to the Pac-12 Conference's All-Century team in Women's Rowing. She was elected into the UCLA Athletics Hall of Fame in 2015.
