= Oldřiška Pěkná =

Czech rower (born 1950)

Personal information
- Nationality: Czech
- Born: 19 September 1950 (age 74); Prague, Czechoslovakia

Sport
- Sport: Rowing

Oldřiška Pěkná (born 19 September 1950) is a Czech rower. She competed in the women's coxless pair event at the 1976 Summer Olympics.
