= Laura Staines =

American rower

Personal information
- Born: November 25, 1953 (age 71); Brooklyn, New York, United States

Sport
- Sport: Rowing

Laura Staines (born November 25, 1953) is an American rower. She competed in the women's coxless pair event at the 1976 Summer Olympics.
