= Zdena Tichá =

Czech rower

Personal information
- Nationality: Czech
- Born: 29 March 1952 (age 73); Prague, Czechoslovakia

Sport
- Sport: Rowing

Zdena Tichá (born 29 March 1952) is a Czech rower. She competed in the women's coxless pair event at the 1976 Summer Olympics.
