= Marinela Maxim =

Romanian rower (born 1955)

Personal information
- Other names: Marinela Ghiţă
- Nationality: Romanian
- Born: 25 January 1955 (age 71) Bucharest, Romania

Sport
- Sport: Rowing

Marinela Maxim (born 25 January 1955), also known as Marinela Ghiţă, is a Romanian rower. She competed in the women's coxless pair event at the 1976 Summer Olympics.
