= Lili Meeuwisse =

Dutch rower

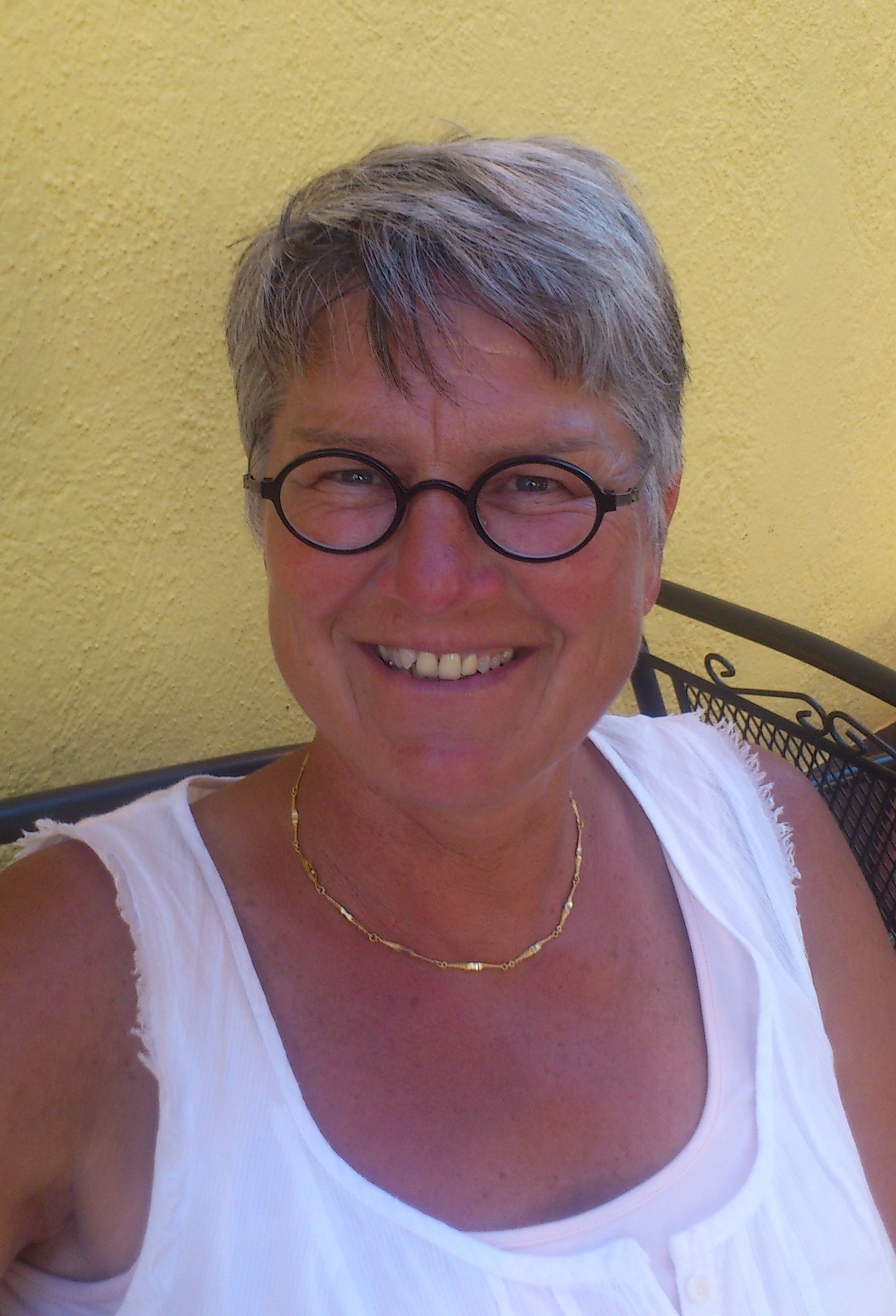
- Lili Meeuwisse in 2013

Personal information
- Nationality: Dutch
- Born: 26 May 1959 (age 65); The Hague, Netherlands

Sport
- Sport: Rowing

Lili Meeuwisse (born 26 May 1959) is a Dutch rower. She competed in the women's quadruple sculls event at the 1980 Summer Olympics.
