= Zuzana Prokešová =

Czech rower (born 1950)

Personal information
- Nationality: Czech
- Born: 11 July 1950 (age 74); Prague, Czechoslovakia

Sport
- Sport: Rowing

Zuzana Prokešová (born 11 July 1950) is a Czech rower. She competed in the women's double sculls event at the 1976 Summer Olympics.
