= Maria Dzieża =

Polish rower

Personal information
- Nationality: Polish
- Born: 26 May 1949 (age 75); Myślenice, Poland

Sport
- Sport: Rowing

Maria Dzieża (born 26 May 1949) is a Polish rower. She competed in the women's quadruple sculls event at the 1980 Summer Olympics.
