= Ágnes Szijj =

Hungarian rower

Personal information
- Nationality: Hungarian
- Born: 2 August 1956 (age 68); Budapest, Hungary

Sport
- Sport: Rowing

Ágnes Szijj (born 2 August 1956) is a Hungarian rower. She competed in the women's quadruple sculls event at the 1976 Summer Olympics.
