= Johanne Delisle =

Canadian rower

Personal information
- Born: 18 May 1951 (age 74) Montreal, Quebec, Canada

Sport
- Sport: Rowing

Johanne Delisle (born 18 May 1951) is a Canadian rower. She competed in the women's quadruple sculls event at the 1976 Summer Olympics.
