= Verka Aleksieva =

Bulgarian rower

Personal information
- Nationality: Bulgarian
- Born: 24 September 1943 (age 81)

Sport
- Sport: Rowing

Verka Aleksieva (Bulgarian: Верка Алексиева; born 24 September 1943) is a Bulgarian rower. She competed in the women's quadruple sculls event at the 1976 Summer Olympics.
