= Maria Kobylińska =

Polish rower

Personal information
- Nationality: Polish
- Born: 2 February 1960 (age 65); Warsaw, Poland

Sport
- Sport: Rowing

Maria Kobylińska (born 2 February 1960) is a Polish rower. She competed in the women's quadruple sculls event at the 1980 Summer Olympics.
