= Elaine Bourbeau =

Canadian rower

Personal information
- Born: 24 October 1949 (age 75); Saint-Germain, Quebec, Canada

Sport
- Sport: Rowing

Elaine Bourbeau (born 24 October 1949) is a Canadian rower. She competed in the women's quadruple sculls event at the 1976 Summer Olympics.
