= Yelena Khloptseva =

Soviet-Belarusian rower

Personal information
- Born: 21 May 1960 (age 66) Minsk, Belarus

Sport
- Sport: Rowing
- Club: Spartak Minsk
Medal record
Women's rowing
Olympic Games
Representing the Soviet Union
Gold medal – first place	1980 Moscow	Double sculls
Representing Unified Team
Bronze medal – third place	1992 Barcelona	Quadruple sculls
World Rowing Championships
Silver medal – second place	1991 Vienna	Quad sculls
Silver medal – second place	1985 Hazewinkel	Quad sculls
Gold medal – first place	1983 Duisburg	Coxed quad sculls
Gold medal – first place	1982 Lucerne	Coxed quad sculls
Bronze medal – third place	1978 Karapiro	Coxed quad sculls
World Rowing Junior Championships
Gold medal – first place	1978 Belgrade	Double sculls

Yelena Khloptseva (born 21 May 1960) is a rower from Belarus and Olympic champion. She won the gold medal in the double scull event with her partner Larisa Popova in the 1980 Moscow Olympic Games representing the Soviet Union. She also won a bronze medal in the quadruple scull event at 1992 Moscow Barcelona Olympic Games. She also won various medals at World Rowing Championships.
