= Yelena Matiyevskaya =

Russian former rower (born 1961)

Personal information
- Born: Yelena Gennadyevna Bratishko; 8 March 1961 (age 65) Minsk, Byelorussian Soviet Socialist Republic
- Height: 168 cm (5 ft 6 in)
- Weight: 62 kg (137 lb)

Sport
- Country: (Soviet Union) USSR
- Sport: Rowing
- Club: Dynamo Sports Club
Medal record
Women's rowing
Representing the Soviet Union
Olympic Games
Silver medal – second place	1980 Moscow	Coxed quad sculls
World Rowing Championships
Gold medal – first place	1982 Lucerne	Double sculls
Silver medal – second place	1983 Duisburg	Double sculls
Silver medal – second place	Hazewinkel 1985	Quad sculls

Yelena Gennadyevna Matiyevskaya (née Bratishko, Russian: Елена Геннадьевна Матиевская; born 8 March 1961) is a Russian former rower who competed in the 1980 Summer Olympics.
