= Cornelia Linse =

East German rower

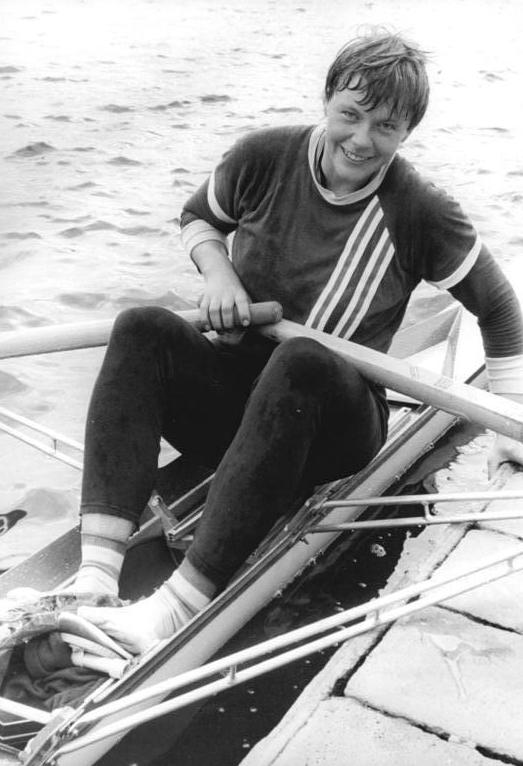
- Linse in 1984

Medal record

Women's rowing

Representing East Germany

Olympic Games
Silver medal – second place	1980 Moscow	Double sculls

World Rowing Championships
Gold medal – first place	1979 Bled	Double sculls
Gold medal – first place	1985 Hazewinkel	Single sculls
Silver medal – second place	1981 Munich	Coxed quad sculls
Silver medal – second place	1982 Lucerne	Coxed quad sculls
Silver medal – second place	1983 Duisburg	Coxed quad sculls

Cornelia Linse (born 3 October 1959 in Greifswald) is a German rower and Olympic medalist. She won the silver medal in double sculls with her partner Heidi Westphal in the 1980 Moscow Olympic Games. In October 1986, she was awarded a Patriotic Order of Merit in gold (first class) for her sporting success.
