= Viola Poley =

German rower (born 1955)

Medal record

Women's rowing

Representing East Germany

Olympic Games
Gold medal – first place	1976 Montreal	Coxed quad sculls

World Rowing Championships
Gold medal – first place	1977 Amsterdam	Coxed quad sculls

Viola Poley (later Kowalschek, born 13 April 1955) is a German rower who competed for East Germany in the 1976 Summer Olympics.

She was born in Berlin in 1955. In 1976, she was a crew member of the East German boat, which won the gold medal in the quadruple sculls event under her maiden name. She competed at the 1977 World Rowing Championships in the coxed quad sculls under her married name and won gold. In February 1978, she was given the sports awards Honoured Master of Sports.
