= Cheryl Howard =

Canadian rower

Personal information
- Nationality: Canadian
- Born: 30 January 1953 (age 72) Comox, British Columbia, Canada

Sport
- Sport: Rowing

Cheryl Howard (born 30 January 1953) is a Canadian rower. She competed in the women's double sculls event at the 1976 Summer Olympics.
