= Kirsten Thomsen =

Danish rower

Personal information
- Nationality: Danish
- Born: 2 November 1954 (age 70); Copenhagen, Denmark

Sport
- Sport: Rowing

Kirsten Thomsen (born 2 November 1954) is a Danish rower. She competed in the women's quadruple sculls event at the 1976 Summer Olympics.
