= Nadezhda Lyubimova =

Russian former rower (born 1959)

Medal record

Women's rowing

Representing the Soviet Union

Olympic Games
Silver medal – second place	1980 Moscow	Coxed quad sculls

Nadezhda Yuryevna Lyubimova (Russian: Надежда Юрьевна Любимова, born 28 December 1959) is a Russian former rower who competed in the 1980 Summer Olympics.
