= Andrea Vissers =

Dutch rower

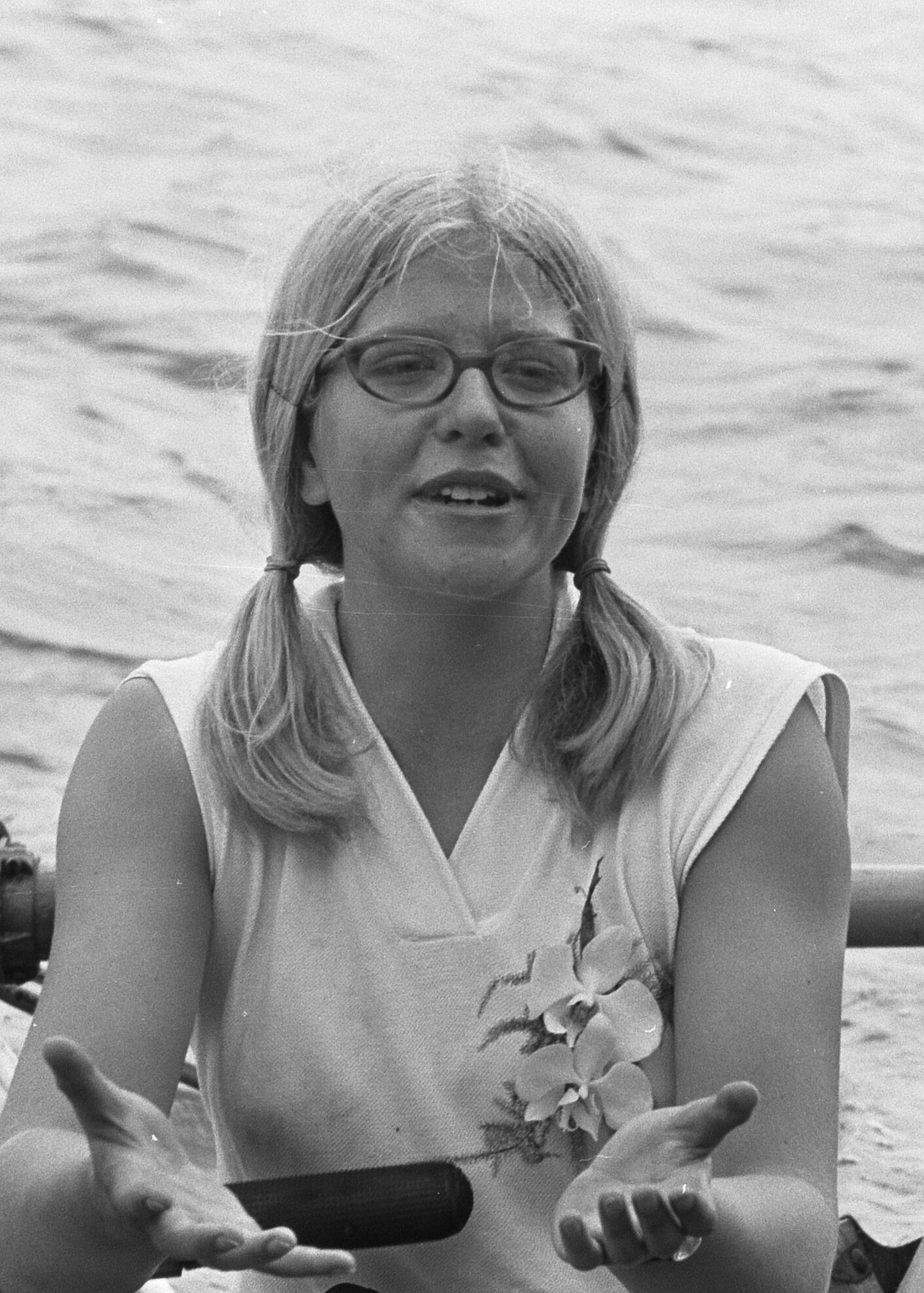
- Vissers (1969)

Personal information
- Full name: Andrea Johanna Maria Vissers
- Nationality: Dutch
- Born: 29 February 1952 (age 73); Amsterdam, Netherlands

Sport
- Sport: Rowing

Andrea Johanna Maria Vissers (born 29 February 1952) is a Dutch rower. She competed in the women's double sculls event at the 1976 Summer Olympics.
