= Svetlana Gincheva =

Bulgarian rower

Personal information
- Nationality: Bulgarian
- Born: 5 January 1956 (age 69)

Sport
- Sport: Rowing

Svetlana Gincheva (Bulgarian: Светлана Гинчева; born 5 January 1956) is a Bulgarian rower. She competed in the women's quadruple sculls event at the 1976 Summer Olympics.
