= Liane Buhr =

German rowing coxswain

Personal information
- Born: 11 March 1956 (age 70) Pritzwalk, Bezirk Potsdam, East Germany
- Height: 154 cm (5 ft 1 in)
- Weight: 42 kg (93 lb)

Sport
- Sport: Rowing
- Club: SG Dynamo Potsdam / Sportvereinigung (SV) Dynamo
Medal record
Women's rowing
Representing East Germany
Olympic Games
Gold medal – first place	1976 Montreal	Coxed quad sculls
Gold medal – first place	1980 Moscow	Coxed quad sculls
World Rowing Championships
Gold medal – first place	1974 Lucerne	Coxed quad sculls
Gold medal – first place	1975 Nottingham	Coxed quad sculls
Gold medal – first place	1979 Bled	Coxed quad sculls

Liane Buhr (née Weigelt, born 11 March 1956 in Pritzwalk, Bezirk Potsdam) is a German rowing coxswain who competed for the SG Dynamo Potsdam / Sportvereinigung (SV) Dynamo. She won medals at the international rowing competitions.

After the 1976 Summer Olympics, she took a break from rowing, started a medical degree and married. She returned to international rowing as Liane Buhr at the 1978 World Rowing Championships in Cambridge, New Zealand, where she came fourth in the women's coxed quad sculls.

Buhr is a general practitioner in Fichtenwalde, a suburb of Beelitz in Brandenburg.
