= Vera Sommerbauer =

Austrian rower

Personal information
- Nationality: Austrian
- Born: 2 June 1959 (age 65)

Sport
- Sport: Rowing

Vera Sommerbauer (born 2 June 1959) is an Austrian rower. She competed in the women's double sculls event at the 1984 Summer Olympics.
