= Anna Marešová =

Czech rower (born 1946)

Personal information
- Nationality: Czech
- Born: 18 November 1946 (age 78); Prague, Czechoslovakia

Sport
- Country: Czechoslovakia
- Sport: Rowing

Anna Marešová (born 18 November 1946) is a Czech rower. She competed for Czechoslovakia in the women's quadruple sculls event at the 1976 Summer Olympics.
