= Karen McCloskey =

American rower

Personal information
- Nationality: American
- Born: June 16, 1951 (age 74) Long Branch, New Jersey, United States

Sport
- Sport: Rowing

Karen McCloskey (born June 16, 1951) is an American rower. She competed in the women's quadruple sculls event at the 1976 Summer Olympics.
