= Olga Vasilchenko =

Russian former rower (born 1956)

Medal record

Women's rowing

Representing the Soviet Union

Olympic Games
Silver medal – second place	1980 Moscow	Coxed quad sculls

Olga Germanovna Vasilchenko (Russian: Ольга Германовна Васильченко; born 8 November 1956) is a Russian former rower who competed in the 1980 Summer Olympics.
