= Liz Hills =

American rower

Personal information
- Born: May 16, 1954 (age 70); Boston, Massachusetts, United States

Sport
- Sport: Rowing

Elizabeth Dorrepaal Hills (born May 16, 1954), now known under her married name as Liz O'Leary, is an American rower. She competed in the women's quadruple sculls event at the 1976 Summer Olympics. The rower Elizabeth McCagg (married name Hills) is her sister-in-law.
