= Carina Gustavsson =

Swedish rower

Personal information
- Nationality: Swedish
- Born: 24 March 1962 (age 63); Ängelholm, Sweden

Sport
- Sport: Rowing

Carina Gustavsson (born 24 March 1962) is a Swedish rower. She competed at the 1984 Summer Olympics and the 1988 Summer Olympics.
