= Marie Bartáková =

Slovak rower (born 1948)

Personal information
- Nationality: Slovak
- Born: 13 November 1948 (age 76); Rimavská Sobota, Czechoslovakia

Sport
- Sport: Rowing

Marie Bartáková (born 13 November 1948) is a Slovak rower. She competed in the women's quadruple sculls event at the 1976 Summer Olympics.
