= Ingun Brechan =

Norwegian sport rower

Ingun Brechan (born 16 April 1954) is a Norwegian sport rower. She was born in Trondheim. She competed at the 1976 Summer Olympics in Montreal, where she placed fourth in the double sculls together with Solfrid Johansen.
