= Cathy Thaxton-Tippett =

American rower

Personal information
- Nationality: American
- Born: March 31, 1957 (age 67)

Sport
- Sport: Rowing

Cathy Thaxton-Tippett (born March 31, 1957) is an American rower. She competed at the 1984 Summer Olympics and the 1988 Summer Olympics.

After competing for Stanford University during her undergrad years, she earned her master's degree in education from Northern Arizona University and went on to teach in the Salmon School District in Idaho.
