= Maria Micșa =

Romanian rower

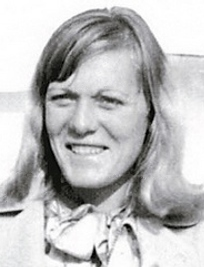

Personal information
- Born: 31 March 1953 (age 73) Timișoara, Romania
- Height: 181 cm (5 ft 11 in)
- Weight: 73 kg (161 lb)

Sport
- Sport: Rowing
Medal record
Representing Romania
Olympic Games
Bronze medal – third place	1976 Montreal	Quadruple sculls
World Rowing Championships
Silver medal – second place	1977 Amsterdam	Quadruple sculls
Silver medal – second place	1980 Hazewinkel	Lwt single sculls
European Rowing Championships
Gold medal – first place	1972 Brandenburg	Quadruple sculls
Silver medal – second place	1973 Moscow	Quadruple sculls

Maria Micşa (later Mosneagu, born 31 March 1953) is a retired Romanian rower who mostly competed in the quadruple sculls. In this event she won the European title in 1972 and an Olympic bronze medal in 1976, placing fourth in 1980; she also won silver medals at the 1977 world and 1973 European championships.
