= Sandra Kirby =

Sandi Kirby OC
- Born: 1949 (age 76–77); Calgary, Alberta
- Education: University of British Columbia; McGill University
- Occupations: Rower and Sociologist
- Sports career
- Sport: rowing
- Writing career
- Subjects: gender in sport, research methods
- Notable works: The dome of silence : sexual harassment and abuse in sport; Experience research social change : methods from the margins

Sandra (Sandi) Kirby OC is a Canadian sociologist born in Calgary, Alberta, September 6, 1949 and a former Olympic athlete. A member of the Canadian women's rowing team at the 1976 Summer Olympics, she competed in the women's quad sculls, with her team finishing ninth.

After competing at the Olympics, she lobbied for a number of years to have the International Olympic Committee drop its requirement that all female athletes automatically had to undergo chromosomal testing to ensure that they were actually female, a rule which was not dropped until the 2000 Summer Olympics.

Kirby completed a bachelor's degree in physical education at the University of British Columbia in 1971 and B.Ed. degree at the same institution in 1972. She later obtained a master's degree at McGill University in 1980, and a doctorate from the University of Alberta in 1986. She is a professor Emerita of sociology at the University of Winnipeg, specializing in study of women in sports. Kirby is well published, featuring her work in over 60 articles and books. Most notably shining a spotlight on sexual abuse and harassment in professional sports. She came out as lesbian after joining the university. She is active in the development of safe sport for athletes as a founding board member of Safe Sport International, and as a speaker on sexual harassment and abuse in sport.

In 2018, Kirby was awarded the Order of Sport, marking her induction into Canada's Sports Hall of Fame. In 2022 she was made an officer of the Order of Canada in recognition for being a "a champion for equity, inclusion and safety in sport".

== Bibliography ==
Books by Sandra Kirby include:

- The dome of silence: sexual harassment and abuse in sport (2000, 2008) ISBN 978-1856499637
- Playing it Forward: 50 years of Women and Sport in Canada ISBN 978-1927583517
- Experience research social change: methods from the margins (1998, 2010, 2017) ISBN 978-0920059821
- Games analysis (1993)
- High performance female athlete retirement (1986)
