= Mariola Abrahamczyk =

Polish rower

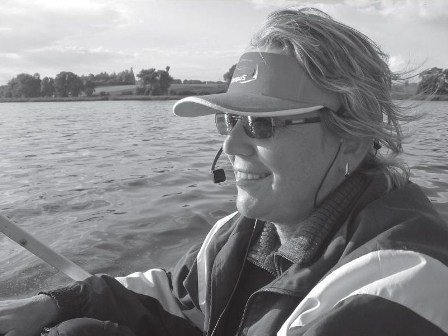
- Mariola Abrahamczk

Personal information
- Birth name: Mariola Teresa Fronckowiak
- Full name: Mariola Teresa Abrahamczyk
- Nationality: Polish
- Born: 3 October 1958 (age 66); Poznań, Poland
- Height: 1.80 m (5 ft 11 in)
- Weight: 70 kg (154 lb)

Sport
- Sport: Rowing

Mariola Teresa Abrahamczyk (née Fronckowiak, born 3 October 1958) is a Polish rower. She competed in the 1980 Summer Olympics.
