= Georgy Vasilchenko =

- Born: January 20, 1921
- Died: 2006
- Citizenship: USSR→Russia
- Scientific career
- Fields: sexology, neuropathology
- Institutions: Moscow Research Institute of Psychiatry (ru), World Health Organization (Denmark)

Georgy Stepanovich Vasilchenko (Russian: Георгий Степанович Васильченко; 1921–2006) was a Russian neuropathologist and the pioneer of sexology in the USSR. He was the first to write Soviet handbooks on sexopathology (1977 and 1983).

== Selected publications ==
- Общая сексопатология: Руководство для врачей (General Sexopathology: Management Manual) / под ред. Г. С. Васильченко. М.: Медицина, 1977. (several editions)
- Васильченко, Г. С. (1979). "Оргазм" [Orgasm]. Большая Советская энциклопедия [The Great Soviet Encyclopaedia] (in Russian).
  For an English translation, see: Vasil’chenko, G. S. "Orgasm". TheFreeDictionary.com.
- Г. С. Васильченко, И. С. Кон. Половая жизнь // Большая советская энциклопедия. — М.: Советская энциклопедия 1969—1978
  For an English translation, see: Kon, Igor; G. S. Vasil’chenko. "Sex Life". TheFreeDictionary.com.
- Васильченко, Г. С. (1979). "Сексопатология" [Sexual Pathology]. Большая Советская энциклопедия [The Great Soviet Encyclopaedia] (in Russian).
  For an English translation, see: Vasil’chenko, G. S. "Sexual Pathology". TheFreeDictionary.com.
