= Elena Giurcă =

Romanian rower (1946–2013)

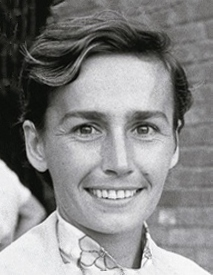

Personal information
- Born: 11 January 1946 Bucharest, Romania
- Died: September 2013 (aged 67)
- Height: 151 cm (4 ft 11 in)
- Weight: 41 kg (90 lb)

Sport
- Sport: Rowing
Medal record
Representing Romania
Olympic Games
Bronze medal – third place	1976 Montreal	Quadruple sculls
World Championships
Silver medal – second place	1974 Lucerne	Quadruple sculls
Silver medal – second place	1977 Amsterdam	Quadruple sculls
Bronze medal – third place	1977 Amsterdam	Coxed four
European Championships
Bronze medal – third place	1969 Klagenfurt	Eight

Elena Giurcă (11 January 1946 – September 2013) was a Romanian rowing coxswain. She took up rowing in 1966 and debuted internationally at the 1969 European Championships, winning a bronze medal in the eights. Later, she mostly competed in the quadruple sculls, finishing third and fourth at the 1976 and 1980 Summer Olympics, respectively. She also won silver medals in this event at the 1974 and 1977 world championships.

In 1969, Giurcă graduated in English from the University of Bucharest, and later taught English at a military academy. She died aged 67 after surgery for a brain aneurysm.
