= Eleonora Kaminskaitė =

Lithuanian rower

Personal information
- Born: 29 January 1951 Stakliškės, Kaunas County, Lithuanian SSR, Soviet Union
- Died: 9 February 1986 (aged 35) Kaunas, Lithuanian SSR, Soviet Union
- Height: 1.78 m (5 ft 10 in)
- Weight: 70 kg (150 lb)

Sport
- Sport: Rowing
- Club: Žalgiris Kaunas
Medal record
Representing the Soviet Union
Olympic Games
Bronze medal – third place	1976 Montreal	Double sculls
World Rowing Championships
Silver medal – second place	1978 Hamilton	Double sculls

Eleonora "Leonora" Kaminskaitė (née Ruokienė, 29 January 1951 – 9 February 1986) was a Lithuanian rower who was most successful in the double sculls. In this event she won a bronze medal at the 1976 Summer Olympics and a silver at the 1978 World Rowing Championships. She graduated from the Lithuanian Sports University in 1972.
