= Daniele Laumann =

Canadian rower (born 1961)

Personal information
- Born: July 8, 1961 (age 64) Toronto, Ontario, Canada
Medal record
Women's rowing
Representing Canada
Bronze medal – third place	1984 Los Angeles	Double sculls

Daniele Laumann (born July 8, 1961) is a Canadian rower. She won a bronze medal in Double sculls with her partner and sister Silken Laumann at the 1984 Los Angeles Olympic Games.
