= Gisela Medefindt =

East German rower

Personal information
- Born: 16 March 1957 (age 69) Burg bei Magdeburg, Germany
- Height: 172 cm (5 ft 8 in)
- Weight: 65 kg (143 lb)

Sport
- Sport: Rowing
- Club: SC Berlin-Grünau
Medal record
Women's rowing
Representing East Germany
Olympic Games
Gold medal – first place	1980 Moscow	Coxed quad sculls
World Rowing Championships
Bronze medal – third place	1974 Lucerne	Double sculls

Gisela Medefindt (later Bodis; born 16 March 1957) is a German rower.

At the 1978 East German national championships, she competed in single scull and came second. Röpke travelled as a reserve to the 1978 World Rowing Championships in New Zealand but did not compete. She competed in the heat of the coxed quadruple sculls at the 1980 Summer Olympics. As a competitor in the heat, she is considered one of the gold medallists.
