= Inge Niedermayer =

Austrian rower

Personal information
- Nationality: Austrian
- Born: 10 May 1959 (age 65)

Sport
- Sport: Rowing

Inge Niedermayer (born 10 May 1959) is an Austrian rower. She competed in the women's double sculls event at the 1984 Summer Olympics.
