= Kirsten Plum Jensen =

Danish rower

Personal information
- Nationality: Danish
- Born: 30 November 1961 (age 63); Gladsaxe, Denmark

Sport
- Sport: Rowing

Kirsten Plum Jensen (born 30 November 1961) is a Danish rower. She competed in the women's quadruple sculls event at the 1976 Summer Olympics.
