= Stanka Georgieva =

Bulgarian rowing cox

Personal information
- Nationality: Bulgarian
- Born: 24 November 1950 (age 75)
- Height: 154 cm (5 ft 1 in)
- Weight: 45 kg (99 lb)

Sport
- Sport: Rowing
Medal record
Women's rowing
Representing Bulgaria
World Rowing Championships
Bronze medal – third place	1977 Amsterdam	Coxed quad sculls

Stanka Georgieva (born 24 November 1950) is a Bulgarian rowing coxswain. She competed at the 1976 Summer Olympics and the 1980 Summer Olympics.
