= Guylaine Bernier =

Canadian rower (born 1948)

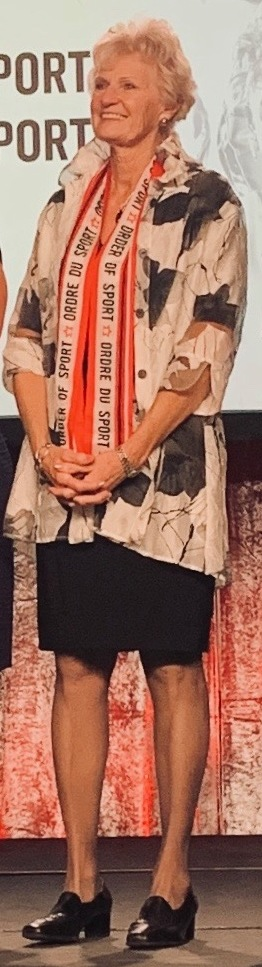
- Guylaine Bernier at the 64th Annual Order of Sport Awards in 2019.
- Born: 26 April 1948 (age 78); Saint-Léon-le-Grand, Quebec, Canada
- Education: École nationale d'administration publique
- Occupations: Athlete, referee, sporting leader, consultant
- Years active: 1972–1976 as athlete; 1987–2010 as referee
- Known for: Rowing (sport)
- Height: 175 cm (5 ft 9 in)

Guylaine Bernier (b. 26 April 1948 in Saint-Léon-le-Grand, Quebec) was a Canadian rower of the 1970s and later became a referee and sporting leader.

== Career ==
A member of the Quebec rowing team in 1972, Bernier won her first national titles in 1974, in skiff and in eight. In 1975 she earned gold medals at the Royal Canadian Henley Regatta and the US Nationals, and the gold medal in solo skiff at the American championships.

Bernier competed at the 1976 Olympic Games in Montreal, where she finished ninth in the quadruple sculls event with coxswain. That year she and her team won silver medals at international regattas in Lucerne and Duisburg.

Bernier became an international rowing judge in 1987. She became a member of the International Rowing Federation (FISA) Arbitration Commission in 1995 and oversaw competitions at international matches including the Olympic Games of 1996, 2000, 2004 and 2008, and the 2008 Paralympic Games and 2010 Youth Olympic Games. In 1996 she was inducted into the Quebec Sports Hall of Fame.

She was president of the Quebec Rowing Association, and sat on the board of directors of Rowing Canada, where she helped to create and promote a handicapped team. She was responsible for Rowing Canada's National Referees Committee.

With a master's degree in administration from the École nationale d'administration publique, Bernier became a member of the Institute of Public Administration of Greater Montreal. In 2002, Bernier joined the board of directors of the National Multisport Centre of Montreal, which became the National Institute of Sport of Quebec (INS Québec); she became its president in 2009. She was also a member of the board of directors of the Canada Games Council and of the Canadian Olympic Committee.

After nearly 35 years working for a crown corporation, Bernier created management consulting business Bernier Mountainy Inc.

At the 2009 gala of Mérites de Sports Québec, Bernier was recognized as official of the year for the third time. She also won the 2002 Fox 40 Award by Sports Officials Canada as a top sports official. She was named 2004 Woman of Influence in Sport and Physical Activity in Canada by the Canadian Association for the Advancement of Women (CAAWS).

In 2019, Bernier was awarded the Order of Sport, marking her induction into Canada's Sports Hall of Fame.
