= Sybille Reinhardt =

East German rower

Medal record

Women's rowing

Representing East Germany

Olympic Games
Gold medal – first place	1980 Moscow	Coxed quad sculls

World Rowing Championships
Gold medal – first place	1974 Lucerne	Coxed quad sculls
Gold medal – first place	1977 Amsterdam	Coxed quad sculls
Gold medal – first place	1979 Bled	Coxed quad sculls

Sybille Reinhardt (née Tietze, 20 October 1957 in Pirna) is a German rower. At the East Germany rowing championships in July 1974, she was the youngest winner of one of the national titles at age 16; she won the double scull partnered with Christine Scheiblich. She has competed under her married name since 1980.
