= Judit Kéri-Novák =

Hungarian rower

Personal information
- Nationality: Hungarian
- Born: 21 January 1950; Budapest, Hungary
- Died: 8 July 2000 (aged 50)

Sport
- Sport: Rowing

Judit Kéri-Novák (21 January 1950 – 8 July 2000) was a Hungarian rower. She competed at the 1976 Summer Olympics and the 1980 Summer Olympics.
