= Zdravka Yordanova =

Bulgarian rower (born 1950)

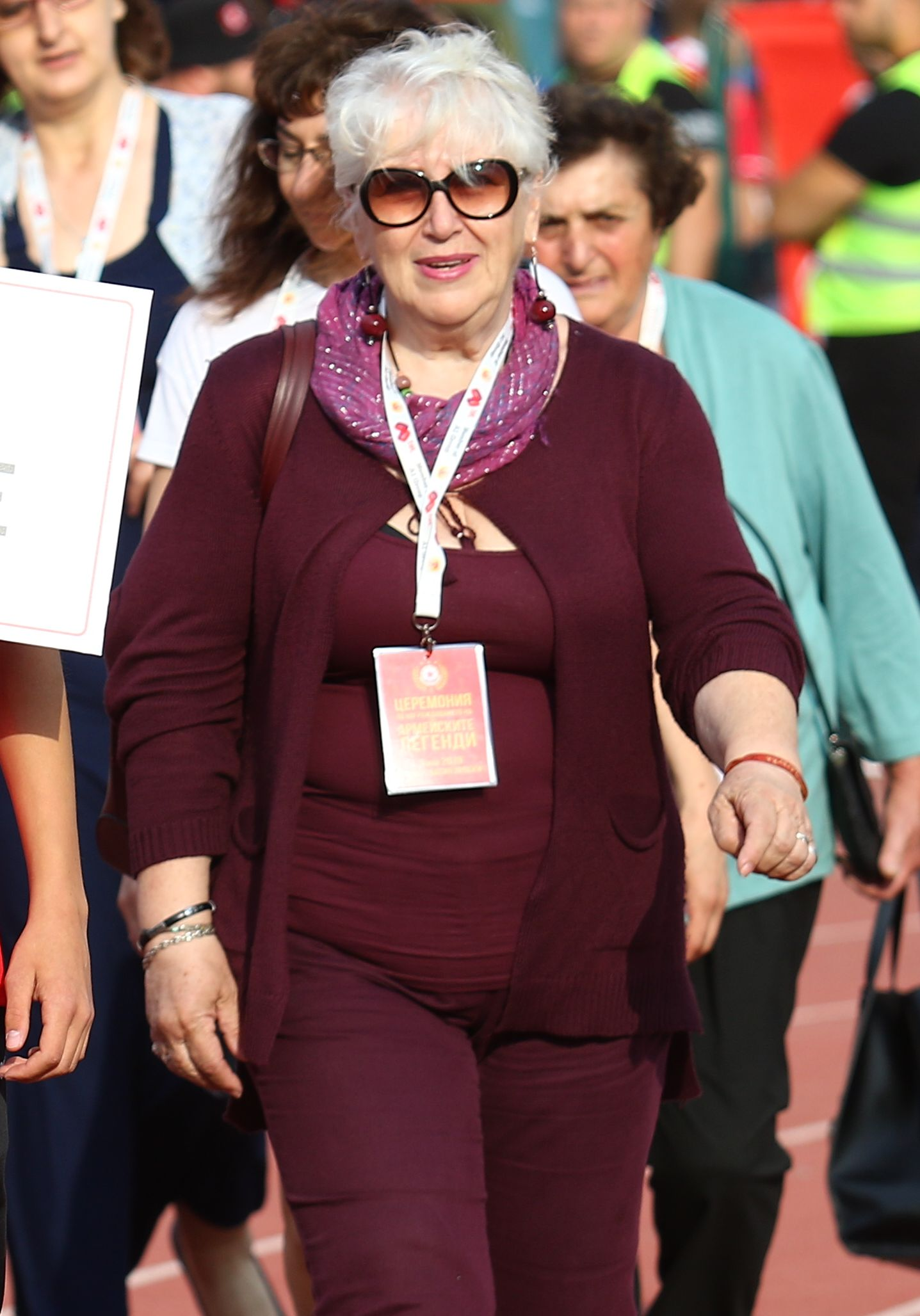

Personal information
- Native name: Здравка Йорданова
- Born: 9 December 1950 (age 75) Sofia, Bulgaria
- Height: 1.68 m (5 ft 6 in)
Medal record
Women's rowing
Representing Bulgaria
Olympic Games
Gold medal – first place	1976 Montreal	Double sculls
World Championships
Bronze medal – third place	1975 Nottingham	Double sculls
Silver medal – second place	1977 Amsterdam	Double sculls
Gold medal – first place	1978 Karapiro	Double sculls

Zdravka Yordanova (Bulgarian: Здравка Йорданова; born 9 December 1950) is a Bulgarian rower and Olympic champion.

She became Olympic champion in 1976 in the double sculls class, together with Svetla Otsetova. She also competed at the 1980 Summer Olympics.
