= Katalin Pál-Ribáry =

Hungarian rower

Personal information
- Nationality: Hungarian
- Born: 28 July 1947 (age 77); Vác, Hungary

Sport
- Sport: Rowing

Katalin Pál-Ribáry (born 28 July 1947) is a Hungarian rower. She competed at the 1976 Summer Olympics and the 1980 Summer Olympics.
