= Solfrid Johansen =

Norwegian rower

Personal information
- Born: 9 February 1956 (age 70) Sandefjord, Norway

Sport
- Sport: Rowing
- Event: Double sculls

Solfrid Johansen (born 9 February 1956) is a Norwegian sport rower. She was born in Sandefjord. She competed at the 1976 Summer Olympics in Montreal, where she placed fourth in the double sculls together with Ingun Brechan.

She competed at the 1984 Summer Olympics in Los Angeles, where she placed fifth in the double sculls, together with Haldis Lenes.
