= Erzsébet Nagy (rowing) =

Hungarian rower

Personal information
- Nationality: Hungarian
- Born: 27 March 1946; Budapest, Hungary
- Died: November 2015 (aged 69)

Sport
- Sport: Rowing

Erzsébet Nagy (27 March 1946 – November 2015) was a Hungarian rower. She competed at the 1976 Summer Olympics and the 1980 Summer Olympics.
