= Nonie Ray =

British rower

Personal information
- Nationality: British
- Born: 3 October 1958 (age 66); Petersfield, England

Sport
- Sport: Rowing

Nonie Ray (born 3 October 1958) is a British rower. She competed in the women's double sculls event at the 1984 Summer Olympics.
