= Haldis Lenes =

Norwegian rower

Personal information
- Nationality: Norwegian
- Born: 2 January 1957 (age 68) Orkdal Municipality, Norway

Sport
- Sport: Rowing

Haldis Lenes (born 2 January 1957) is a Norwegian sport rower. She was born in Orkdal Municipality. She competed at the 1984 Summer Olympics in Los Angeles, where she placed fifth in the double sculls, together with Solfrid Johansen.
