= Ilona Bata =

Hungarian rower

Personal information
- Nationality: Hungarian
- Born: 14 December 1955 (age 69); Budapest, Hungary

Sport
- Sport: Rowing

Ilona Bata (born 14 December 1955) is a Hungarian rower. She competed at the 1976 Summer Olympics and the 1980 Summer Olympics.
