= Kamilla Kosztolányi =

Hungarian rower

Personal information
- Nationality: Hungarian
- Born: 21 July 1956 (age 70) Budapest, Hungary

Sport
- Sport: Rowing

Kamilla Kosztolányi (born 21 July 1956) is a Hungarian rower. She competed at the 1976 Summer Olympics and the 1980 Summer Olympics.
