= Svetla Otsetova =

Bulgarian rower (born 1950)

Medal record

Women's rowing

Representing Bulgaria

Olympic Games
| Gold medal – first place | 1976 Montreal | Double sculls |

World Rowing Championships
| Gold medal – first place | 1978 Karapiro | Double sculls |
| Silver medal – second place | 1977 Amsterdam | Double sculls |
| Silver medal – second place | 1979 Bled | Double sculls |
| Bronze medal – third place | 1975 Nottingham | Double sculls |

Svetla Otsetova (Bulgarian: Светла Оцетова, born 23 November 1950) is a Bulgarian rower.

She won a gold medal with Zdravka Yordanova in women's double sculls rowing in the 1976 Montreal Olympics. She also competed at the 1980 Summer Olympics.

She is the third woman in history to serve in the International Olympic Committee. Otsetova was the president of the Bulgarian Rowing Federation until 2012. She is also a recipient of the Order of Stara Planina (1st class).
