= Valéria Gyimesi =

Hungarian rower

Personal information
- Nationality: Hungarian
- Born: 22 December 1955 (age 69); Budapest, Hungary

Sport
- Sport: Rowing

Valéria Gyimesi (born 22 December 1955) is a Hungarian rower. She competed at the 1976 Summer Olympics and the 1980 Summer Olympics.
