= Ineke Donkervoort =

Dutch rower

Personal information
- Born: 1 April 1953 (age 73) Rotterdam, the Netherlands
- Height: 1.76 m (5 ft 9 in)
- Weight: 65 kg (143 lb)

Sport
- Sport: Rowing
- Club: Okeanos, Amsterdam

Huiberdina "Ineke" Donkervoort (born 1 April 1953) is a Dutch sports administrator and retired rower. She competed at the 1980 Summer Olympics in the quad sculls and finished in sixth place.

Donkervoort retired from competitions the same year and became a sport functionary. Between 1982 and 1998 she was a member and eventually vice-president of the top-sport division at the Dutch Olympic Committee. She then took various leading positions such as director of the Academy of Physical Education in Amsterdam (1998–1999). In 2002, she returned to rowing and until 2007 coached the national junior team.
